= Priyadarshan filmography =

Priyadarshan is an Indian film director, producer, and screenwriter. Priyadarshan is mostly known for directing comedy films but has directed a few non-comical films such as a historical epic film based around freedom fighters in India titled Kaalapani and his epic period drama Kancheevaram. In a career spanning over four decades, Priyadarshan has directed 98 films in several Indian languages, predominantly Malayalam and Hindi, besides eight in Tamil, and two in Telugu. Though he began his career in Malayalam cinema in 1984, Priyadarshan was mainly active in Hindi cinema for 2001–2010. In 2013, he announced Rangrezz would be his last Hindi film for a short period; and focused on making more Malayalam films.

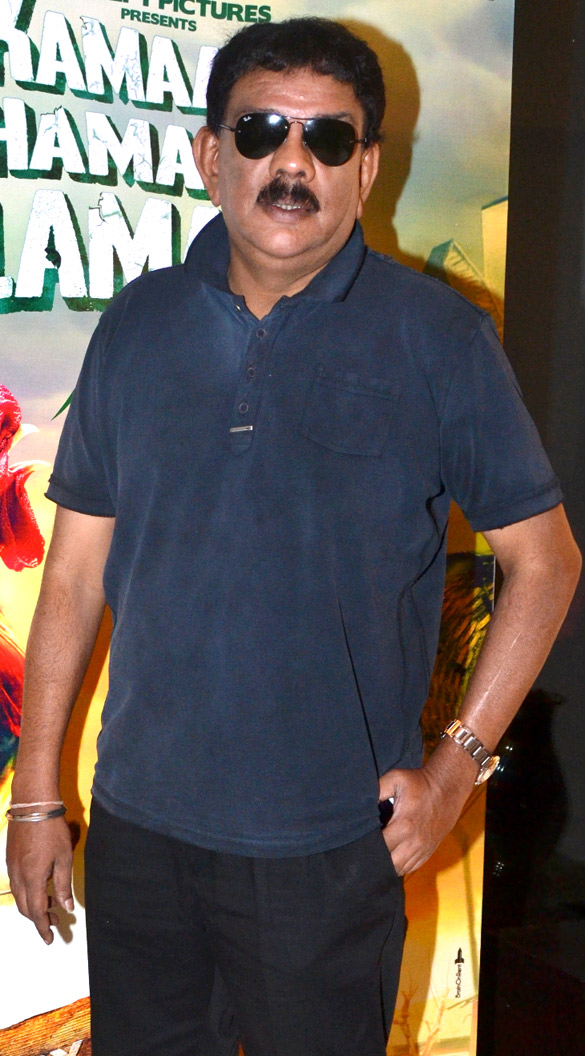
Priyadarshan in 2012

Priyadrshan has also tried his hand at action and thriller films from time to time. His collaborations with Mohanlal were highly popular and noted in Malayalam cinema during the 1980s and 1990s, with films such as Poochakkoru Mookkuthi, Mazha Peyyunnu Maddalam Kottunnu, Thalavattam, Vellanakalude Nadu, Chithram, Vandanam, Kilukkam, Abhimanyu, Mithunam, Thenmavin Kombath, and Kala Pani. Actors he has worked with over several films include Mohanlal, Kuthiravattam Pappu, Jagathy Sreekumar, Nedumudi Venu, Sreenivasan, Sukumari, Mukesh and Mammukoya, Prakash Raj. He was also credited as the story writer of the 1986 film Ninnishtam Ennishtam.

Priyadarshan was one of the first directors in India to introduce rich color grading, clear sound and quality dubbing through his Malayalam films. Upon entering Bollywood, he has mostly adapted stories from popular comedy films from Malayalam cinema, some from his own work and some from others works. These include Hera Pheri, Hungama, Hulchul, Garam Masala, Bhagam Bhag, Chup Chup Ke, Dhol, Bhool Bhulaiyaa, De Dana Dan, Khatta Meetha and Bhooth Bangla. Actors he has worked with multiple times in Hindi cinema include Akshay Kumar,Suniel Shetty, Akshaye Khanna, Paresh Rawal, Om Puri, Kareena Kapoor, and Rajpal Yadav.

== Films ==
Year	Title	Language	Credited as		Notes	Ref.
Year	Title	Language	Director	Screenwriter	Notes	Ref.
1982	Sindoora Sandhyakku Mounam	Malayalam	I.V. Sasi	Yes		
1983	Bhookambam	Malayalam	Joshiy	Yes		
1983	Kuyilinethedi	Malayalam	M. Mani	Yes		
1983	Nathi Muthal Nathi Vare	Malayalam	Vijayanand	Yes		
1983	Engane Nee Marakkum	Malayalam	M. Mani	Yes		
1984	Ente Kalithozhan	Malayalam	M. Mani	Yes		
1984	Poochakkoru Mookkuthi	Malayalam	Yes	Yes		
1984	Odaruthammava Aalariyam	Malayalam	Yes	Yes		
1984	Vanitha Police	Malayalam	Alleppey Ashraf	Yes		
1984	Muthodu Muthu	Malayalam	M. Mani	Yes		
1985	Punnaram Cholli Cholli	Malayalam	Yes	No		
1985	Onnanam Kunnil Oradi Kunnil	Malayalam	Yes	Yes		
1985	Aram + Aram = Kinnaram	Malayalam	Yes	No		
1985	Boeing Boeing	Malayalam	Yes	Yes		
1985	Parayanumvayya Parayathirikkanumvayya	Malayalam	Yes	No		
1986	Dheem Tharikida Thom	Malayalam	Yes	Yes		
1986	Ayalvasi Oru Daridravasi	Malayalam	Yes	No		
1986	Mazha Peyyunnu Maddalam Kottunnu	Malayalam	Yes	No		
1986	Chekkeranoru Chilla	Malayalam	Sibi Malayil	Yes		
1986	Hello My Dear Wrong Number	Malayalam	Yes	No		
1986	Ninnishtam Ennishtam	Malayalam	Alleppey Ashraf	Yes		
1986	Thalavattam	Malayalam	Yes	Yes		
1986	Rakkuyilin Ragasadassil	Malayalam	Yes	No		
1987	Chinnamanikkuyile	Tamil	Yes	No	Unreleased	
1987	Cheppu	Malayalam	Yes	Yes		
1988	Mukunthetta Sumitra Vilikkunnu	Malayalam	Yes	No		
1988	Oru Muthassi Katha	Malayalam	Yes	No		
1988	Aryan	Malayalam	Yes	No		
1988	Vellanakalude Nadu	Malayalam	Yes	No		
1988	Chithram	Malayalam	Yes	Yes		
1989	Vandanam	Malayalam	Yes	No		
1989	Dhanushkodi	Malayalam	Yes	No	Dropped Project	
1990	Akkare Akkare Akkare	Malayalam	Yes	No		
1990	Kadathanadan Ambadi	Malayalam	Yes	No		
1991	Nirnayam	Telugu	Yes	Yes		
1991	Gopura Vasalile	Tamil	Yes	Yes		
1991	Kilukkam	Malayalam	Yes	Yes	25th Film as a Director	
1991	Abhimanyu	Malayalam	Yes	No		
1992	Advaitham	Malayalam	Yes	No		
1992	Muskurahat	Hindi	Yes	Yes		
1993	Midhunam	Malayalam	Yes	No		
1993	Gardish	Hindi	Yes	Yes		
1994	The City	Malayalam	I.V. Sasi	Yes		
1994	Kinnaripuzhayoram	Malayalam	Haridas	Yes		
1994	Gandeevam	Telugu	Yes	No		
1994	Thenmavin Kombath	Malayalam	Yes	Yes		
1994	Minnaram	Malayalam	Yes	Yes		
1996	Kala Pani	Malayalam	Yes	Yes		
1997	Virasat	Hindi	Yes	No		
1997	Chandralekha	Malayalam	Yes	Yes		
1997	Oru Yathramozhi	Malayalam	Prathap Pothen	Yes		
1998	Saat Rang Ke Sapne	Hindi	Yes	Yes		
1998	Kabhi Na Kabhi	Hindi	Yes	No		
1998	Doli Saja Ke Rakhna	Hindi	Yes	No		
1999	Megham	Malayalam	Yes	Yes		
2000	Hera Pheri	Hindi	Yes	No		
2000	Snegithiye	Tamil	Yes	Yes		
2001	Kakkakuyil	Malayalam	Yes	Yes	Also producer	
2001	Yeh Teraa Ghar Yeh Meraa Ghar	Hindi	Yes	No		
2003	Lesa Lesa	Tamil	Yes	No		
2003	Kilichundan Mampazham	Malayalam	Yes	Yes		
2003	Hungama	Hindi	Yes	Yes		
2004	Wanted	Malayalam	Murali Nagavally	Yes		
2004	Hulchul	Hindi	Yes	No		
2004	Vettam	Malayalam	Yes	Yes		
2005	Garam Masala	Hindi	Yes	Yes	50th Film as a Director	
2005	Kyon Ki	Hindi	Yes	Yes		
2006	Bhagam Bhag	Hindi	Yes	No		
2006	Malamaal Weekly	Hindi	Yes	Yes		
2006	Chup Chup Ke	Hindi	Yes	No		
2007	Raakilipattu	Malayalam	Yes	Yes		
2007	Dhol	Hindi	Yes	No		
2007	Bhool Bhulaiyaa	Hindi	Yes	Yes		
2008	Mere Baap Pehle Aap	Hindi	Yes	No		
2008	Kanchivaram	Tamil	Yes	Yes		
2009	Billu	Hindi	Yes	No		
2009	De Dana Dan	Hindi	Yes	Yes		
2010	Khatta Meetha	Hindi	Yes	Yes		
2010	Bumm Bumm Bole	Hindi	Yes	No		
2010	Aakrosh	Hindi	Yes	No		
2011	Oru Marubhoomikkadha	Malayalam	Yes	Yes		
2012	Tezz	Hindi	Yes	No		
2012	Kamaal Dhamaal Malamaal	Hindi	Yes	No		
2013	Rangrezz	Hindi	Yes	No		
2013	Geethaanjali	Malayalam	Yes	Yes		
2014	Aamayum Muyalum	Malayalam	Yes	Yes		
2016	Oppam	Malayalam	Yes	Yes		
2018	Nimir	Tamil	Yes	Yes		
2018	Sometimes	Tamil	Yes	Yes		
2021	Hungama 2	Hindi	Yes	No		
2021	Marakkar: Lion of the Arabian Sea	Malayalam	Yes	Yes		
2023	Corona Papers	Malayalam	Yes	Yes	Also producer	
2023	Appatha	Tamil	Yes	No		
2026	Bhooth Bangla	Hindi	Yes	Yes	Co-written screenplay with Rohan Shankar, Abilash Nair	
2026	Haiwaan	Hindi	Yes	Yes		
TBA	Untitled Mohanlal film †	Malayalam	Yes	Yes	Announced	

=== Other credits ===
Year	Title	Language	Role
1978	Thiranottam	Malayalam	Assistant director
1981	Thenum Vayambum	Malayalam	Assistant director
1982	Padayottam	Malayalam	Script supervisor
1993	Manichitrathazhu	Malayalam	Second Unit director
2008	Poi Solla Porom	Tamil	Producer

=== Acting credits ===
Year	Title	Language	Role	Notes
1983	Hello Madras Girl	Malayalam	Man in restaurant	Uncredited
1986	T. P. Balagopalan M.A.	Malayalam	Film director	Cameo
1990	No. 20 Madras Mail	Malayalam	Himself	Cameo

== Television ==
Year	Title	Language	Credited as		Notes	Platform	Ref.
Year	Title	Language	Director	Writer	Notes	Platform	Ref.
2020	Forbidden Love	Hindi	Yes	Yes	Episode: "Anamika"	ZEE5	
2021	Navarasa	Tamil	Yes	Yes	Episode: "Summer of '92"	Netflix	
2024	Manorathangal	Malayalam	Yes		Episodes: "Olavum Theeravum" and "Shilalikhithangal"	ZEE5	
