= Faraar (1975 film) =

Faraar (1975)
- Release poster
- फरार
- Directed by: Shankar Mukherjee
- Written by: Gulzar; Madhusudan Kalelkar; Khayaae; Akhil Kumar; Prtho Mukherjee
- Produced by: Alankar Chitra
- Starring: Amitabh Bachchan; Sharmila Tagore; Sanjeev Kumar
- Cinematography: K.H. Kapadia
- Edited by: Babu Lavande
- Music by: Songs: Kalyanji Anandji; Background Score: Salil Chowdhury
- Production companies: Filmistan Studio; Filmways Studios; K. Asif Studios
- Distributed by: Alankar Chitra; Trimurti Films Pvt. Ltd.
- Release date: 21 November 1975
- Running time: 105 minutes
- Country: India
- Language: Hindi

Faraar (transl. Absconding) is a 1975 Bollywood crime film drama. The film is produced by Alankar Chitra and directed by Shanker Mukherjee. The film stars Amitabh Bachchan, Sharmila Tagore, Sanjeev Kumar, Sulochna, Sajjan, Agha and Bhagwan Dada. The music is by Kalyanji Anandji. The movie was remade in Malayalam by Priyadarshan as Parayanumvayya Parayathirikkanumvayya. The rights & IPR of this film are now owned by Ruchi Pictures.

== Plot ==
Faraar is a taut emotional thriller that explores the tension between justice, vengeance, and moral duty. The story follows Rajesh, a modest, law-abiding man whose life is shattered when his beloved sister is brutally raped and murdered by a wealthy man named Kishanlal. Despite the overwhelming evidence of his guilt, Kishanlal escapes conviction through money and influence, exploiting a system that favors the rich. This injustice transforms Rajesh from a peace-loving citizen into a desperate man bent on revenge.

Unable to endure the mockery of justice, Rajesh takes the law into his own hands and kills Kishanlal. In that single act, he crosses the line from victim to outlaw. The same society that failed him now brands him a criminal. With the police on his trail, Rajesh becomes a fugitive — the “faraar” of the title — and flees from the city, seeking refuge in a quiet hill station. Fate, however, leads him to an unexpected and emotionally complex hiding place.

He breaks into a secluded bungalow, hoping to find temporary shelter, only to discover that it belongs to Inspector Sanjay, the very officer leading the manhunt for him. Even more shocking is the presence of Sanjay's wife, Asha — who was once Rajesh's sweetheart before circumstances tore them apart. Asha, now living a peaceful domestic life, is stunned to see Rajesh reappear as a wanted criminal. Rajesh, realizing the danger he faces, takes the couple's young son hostage as protection, though he never harms or frightens the boy.

As days pass, the situation evolves from fear and tension to deep emotional conflict. Rajesh forms a tender bond with the child, seeing in him the innocence and love his own life has lost. Asha is torn between her duty as a wife and mother and her lingering compassion for the man she once loved. Meanwhile, Inspector Sanjay remains unaware that the fugitive he seeks is hiding under his own roof — until mounting clues slowly lead him to the truth.

The film builds toward a moral and emotional climax as the three central figures confront their intertwined fates. When Sanjay finally discovers Rajesh's identity, a violent showdown seems inevitable. Yet, in the end, Faraar transcends its thriller structure to become a story about the human cost of justice denied. Rajesh, wounded and exhausted, chooses not to fight any longer. Mortally shot by the police, he dies in Sanjay's arms, expressing neither hatred nor regret — only the sorrow of a man who found justice too late. His death serves as a tragic commentary on a society where law and morality often diverge.

The film concludes with Rajesh's funeral pyre burning against a somber sky — a visual symbol of both redemption and futility. Faraar stands out as a powerful exploration of vengeance, love, and ethical conflict, elevated by fine performances and Salil Chowdhury's haunting music.

== Cast ==
- Amitabh Bachchan as Rajesh (Raj)
- Sharmila Tagore as Mala / Asha
- Sanjeev Kumar as Inspector Sanjay
- Sulochana Latkar as Raj's Mother
- Rajan Haksar as Tarun Kumar
- D.K. Sapru as Defence Lawyer
- Bhagwan as the Constable
- Murad as the Police Commissioner
- Irrfan khan as young Rajesh Kumar Srivastav

== Soundtrack ==
Lyrics: Rajendra Krishan

#	Title	Singer(s)
1	"Main Pyaasa Tum Sawan (Duet)"	Kishore Kumar, Lata Mangeshkar
2	"Main Pyaasa Tum Sawan (Male)"	Kishore Kumar
3	"Main Pyaasi Tum Sawan (Female)"	Lata Mangeshkar
4	"Humra Yeh Dil Jaani" (version 1)	Usha Mangeshkar, Asha Bhosle
5	"Yeh Zindagi Kya Hai"	Mukesh
6	"Humra Yeh Dil Jaani" (version 2)	Usha Mangeshkar, Asha Bhosle
