= Dakota Picture =

2012 Kannada film

- Directed by: Om Prakash Rao
- Story by: Priyadarshan
- Based on: Malamaal Weekly (2006) by Priyadarshan
- Produced by: Rockline Venkatesh
- Dialogue by: Sarigama Viji; Gururaja Desai
- Starring: Rockline Venkatesh; Nikesha Patel
- Cinematography: Jagadish Vali
- Edited by: S Manohar
- Music by: Hamsalekha
- Production company: Rockline Productions
- Release date: 1 November 2012
- Country: India
- Language: Kannada

Dakota Picture (transl. Bad film (Note: "Dakota" is a Kannada slang term denoting poor quality.)) is a 2012 Indian Kannada-language film directed by Om Prakash Rao, starring Rockline Venkatesh, Nikesha Patel and Doddanna in lead roles. It is a remake of Malamaal Weekly (2006), itself an adaptation of Waking Ned (1998).

== Plot ==
Anthony dies of shock when he learns he has won the lottery. Chaos ensues when the lottery ticket seller and others associated with Anthony try to claim the prize money.

== Cast ==
- Rockline Venkatesh as Krishna
- Nikesha Patel as Radha
- Doddanna as Lachchanna
- Mukhyamantri Chandru as Halappa
- Shashi Kumar
- Om Prakash Rao
- Sundar Raj
- M. S. Umesh
- Mandeep Roy
- Malathi Sardeshpande
- Raju Talikote as Anthony
- Rockline Sudhakar
- Sarigama Viji
- Sneha Siyon

== Reception ==
A critic from The Times of India scored the film at 3 out of 5 stars and says "Though there is no leading star as hero, Rockline Venkatesh and Omprakash have managed to keep the movie alive. But it is Doddanna as lottery agent and Mukhya Manthri Chandru who steal the show with their good performance". A critic from The New Indian Express wrote "Camerawork by Jagadish Wali and songs by Hamsalekha are well delivered with the right amount of energy and madness maintained throughout the film. Verdict: This comedy flick remains a winner in spite of a few mishaps". B S S from Deccan Herald wrote "The Rockline-Omprakash Rao combo fails to foist their no-brainer comedy on the viewer successfully this time. If only more time and attention were bestowed on the screenplay! Dakota Picture remains just that". A critic from News18 India wrote "while Hamsalekha's background musical score is good. 'Dakota Picture' has nothing unusual to offer, but can be watched once for the efforts of veterans like Doddanna and Mukyamanthri Chandru". Srikanth Srinivasa from Rediff.com scored the film at 3 out of 5 stars and says "Hamsalekha's background score is praiseworthy. Dakota Picture is a watchable movie with a lot of funny moments. Only the title is a misnomer and may deter people from seeing this family entertainer. Just watch it and be entertained!". VS Rajapur from DNA wrote "Veterans Mukyamanthri Chandru and Doddanna have delivered their best performance in the film. Rockline Venkatesh puts in good efforts, but the film's heroine Nikisha has a lot to learn. Shashi Kumar, Raju Thalikote and Mandip Rai shine in their respective roles". A critic from Bangalore Mirror wrote "Hamsalekha, comes up with a couple of good compositions. For once, Omprakash has managed to copy from just one film and it has turned out good".
