= Chekkeranoru Chilla =

1986 Indian film

Chekkeran Oru Chilla
- Directed by: Sibi Malayil
- Screenplay by: Priyadarshan
- Based on: Saaheb by Anil Ganguly
- Produced by: Shankar Panicker
- Starring: Shankar Panicker; Ambika; Jagathy Sreekumar; Nedumudi Venu
- Cinematography: S. Kumar
- Edited by: L. Bhoominathan
- Music by: Shyam
- Production company: Shanghupushpam Films
- Distributed by: Saj Productions
- Release date: 20 February 1986
- Country: India
- Language: Malayalam

Chekkeran Oru Chilla (transl. A branch to perch on) is a 1986 Indian Malayalam-language drama film directed by Sibi Malayil, written by ranjan roy and screenplay and dialogue by Priyadarshan, and produced by Shankar. It is a remake of the 1981 Bengali film Saheb. The film stars Shankar, along with Bharath Gopi, Ambika, and Nedumudi Venu. The film has musical score by Shyam.

== Plot ==
Unni is a promising football goalkeeper and he aims to be in the national team. He is often criticised by family members for not taking care of his family, completing his education, or making money. His sister gets a good marriage proposal, but his father does not have the financial means to fund the marriage. His sisters and brothers are stingy with money. His elder brother's wife tries to help but it doesn't help much. Unni as an unemployed youth takes responsibility in ways opportunity opens for him and that forms the climax.

== Cast ==
- Shankar as Unni
- Ambika as Lathika aka Lallu
- Jagathy Sreekumar as Kunjuraman aka Pulluvan aka Kavi Kunjumamman
- Nedumudi Venu as Govindan, the father.
- Lissy as Chinnu, the sister.
- Bharath Gopi
- Raghavan
- M. G. Soman
- Ravi Menon
- Seema
- Sreenath
- Valsala Menon
- Sukumari
- Kannur Sreelatha

== Soundtrack ==
The music was composed by Shyam and the lyrics were written by Chunakkara Ramankutty.

| No. | Song | Singers | Lyrics |
|---|---|---|---|
| 1 | "Jeevitham Shaashwatha" | Unni Menon | Chunakkara Ramankutty |
| 2 | "Poonilaavudichallo" | Vani Jairam, Unni Menon | Chunakkara Ramankutty |
| 3 | "Snehappookkal Vaarichoodi" | Unni Menon | Chunakkara Ramankutty |

== Trivia ==
- This is actor Shankar's first and only home production.
