= Mutharamkunnu P.O. =

1985 Indian film

- Newspaper snippet
- Directed by: Sibi Malayil
- Screenplay by: Sreenivasan
- Story by: Jagadish
- Produced by: G. Subramanian
- Starring: Mukesh; Lizy; Nedumudi Venu
- Cinematography: S. Kumar
- Edited by: V. P. Krishnan
- Music by: Shyam
- Production company: Rajeswary International
- Distributed by: Jubilee Pictures
- Release date: 1985
- Country: India
- Language: Malayalam

Mutharamkunnu P.O. is a 1985 Indian Malayalam-language romantic comedy film directed by Sibi Malayil (in his directorial debut) from a screenplay by Sreenivasan based on a story by Jagadish. It stars Mukesh, Lizy, Nedumudi Venu, Sreenivasan and Jagadish. The plot tells the story of a newly arrived postmaster in a village where people uplift the sport of gatta gusthi (wrestling), he falls in love with the daughter of a retired wrestler who challenges him for a duel with a reigning champion Dara Singh. The film was remade in Hindi as Kushti (2010). Despite being an average grosser at box office the film received positive critical reception. Over the years, the film has accumulated a cult following and huge fan base.

== Plot ==
Kuttan Pillai is a retired gatta gusthi wrestler who loves boasting about the greatness of his career. He keeps his grudge against wrestler Udumb who broke Pillai's feet crippling him for life. His sole aim is to defeat Udumb and therefore trains wrestlers to have a fight with him. Each time his brother in law leaks information about the trained wrestler's weakness to Udumb thereby helping him win everytime. He wants Amminikutty, his daughter, to marry a successful wrestler. Dilip Kumar comes to their village as a postmaster and falls in love with Amminikutty. This outrages Kuttan Pillai who says Dilip has to win a wrestling match with his friend Dara Singh to marry his daughter. Soon a wrestling match is organised and Dilip and Dara Singh get into a rib-tickling fight.

== Cast ==
- Mukesh as Dilip Kumar
- Lizy as K. P. Amminikutty
- Nedumudi Venu as Kuttan Pillai, Amminikutty's father
- Sreenivasan as Dev Anand
- Jagadish as Vasu
- Jagathy Sreekumar as M. K. Nakulan
- V. D. Rajappan as M. K. Sahadevan
- Sukumari as Amminikutty's mother
- Kuthiravattam Pappu as K. P. K. Thankappan or Theepori
- Dara Singh as himself
- Bobby Kottarakkara as Ramanan
- James
- Rashid as Udumbu Velayudhan
- Sreeja

== Production ==
The film was the directorial debut of Sibi Malayil. It was written by Sreenivasan from a story by Jagadish, the story was set in a fictional village named Mutharamkunnu, although there actually exist two places with that name in Kerala. The movie was initially named Pathaaykunnu P.O.. The film was shot at Melila village in Kottarakkara, Kerala. Wrestler Dara Singh appeared as himself in the film. For that character, Sreenivasan originally wrote in the screenplay "someone like Dara Singh", but later they decided to hire Singh himself. Jagadish went to Mumbai to hire Singh, with a remuneration of ₹25,000, the whole film was produced in less than ₹5 lakh. There is a bout between Mukesh's character and Dara Singh at the end of the film. In the original ending, Singh submits to Mukesh in order to trick Nedumudi Venu. However, Singh objected to the ending saying that it is unethical to his profession and it is too much to ask a wrestling champion to lose to a non-wrestler. Mukesh recalled that Singh had warned him that he would beat him to pulp if he applies any unfamiliar techniques on him. It was only later he realised that it was a practical joke set up by Jagadish and Nedumudi Venu, they had told Singh that Mukesh was a university wrestling champion, which he is not, and he is planning to takedown Singh with some new technique. Mukesh was spared after he pleaded to Singh and convinced him it was a joke.

== Box office ==
The film was not a theatrical success, Mukesh told in an interview to The Hindu that "its failure at the box office disappointed me for it was a good film". Sreenivasan said in an interview that although the film was not a success, it was noticed and director Sibi Malayil got a lot of offers because of this film.
