= Oru Muthassi Katha =

1988 Indian film

- Directed by: Priyadarshan
- Written by: Jagadeesh
- Produced by: R. B. Choudary
- Starring: Vineeth; Nirosha; Thiagarajan; K. B. Ganesh Kumar; M. G. Soman; Innocent; Lizy
- Cinematography: S. Kumar
- Edited by: L. Bhoominathan
- Music by: Ouseppachan
- Production company: Super Film International
- Distributed by: Super & Cherupushpam Release
- Release date: 3 April 1988
- Country: India
- Language: Malayalam

Oru Muthassi Katha (transl. A grandmother tale) is a 1988 Indian Malayalam-language drama film directed by Priyadarshan and written by Jagadeesh. The film stars Vineeth and Nirosha, supported by Thiagarajan with K. B. Ganesh Kumar, M. G. Soman, Innocent and Lizy playing other important roles. The film was failure at the box office.

== Plot ==
The story is set in a fisherman village in the western coast of Kerala. The story revolves around the antagonist Chemparundu who is responsible for many murders in the village. Karthu, the daughter of Chemparundu falls for Chanthu, an orphan. As the story progresses, Unnikrishnan, a young man with mysterious intentions arrives at the village for fishing business.

== Cast ==
- Vineeth as Chanthu
- Nirosha as Karthu
- Thiagarajan as Chemparundu Machan
- K. B. Ganesh Kumar as Unnikrishnan
- M. G. Soman as Mayinkutty
- Sukumaran as Rajasekharan
- Jalaja as Parvathi
- Innocent as Thampuran
- Lizy as Thresia
- Maniyanpilla Raju as Abdu
- Jagadish as Anthappan
- Jagathy Sreekumar as Chellayyan
- Thikkurissy Sukumaran Nair as Uppooppa
- Sukumari as Akkan
- Kuthiravattam Pappu as Koyammedikka
- Bobby Kottarakkara as Varghese
- Jose as Bapputty
- Santhosh as Karuppayyan
- Jayalalita as Valli
- V. K. Pavithran
- Philomina as Unniyeri, Guest Appearance in Song "Nalla Muthassiyamma"

== Soundtrack ==
Oru Muthassi Katha

Soundtrack album by Ouseppachan
- Released: 1991
- Genre: Feature film soundtrack

The music has been provided by Ouseppachan for the lyrics written by Shibu Chakravarthy.

#	Title	Singer(s)
1	"Kadappurathe Chaakara"	M. G. Sreekumar, P. Leela, CO Anto
2	"Kandaal Chirikkaatha"	M. G. Sreekumar & Sujatha Mohan
3	"Nalla Muthassiyamma"	M. G. Sreekumar, P. Leela, Sujatha Mohan, CO Anto
4	"Pandathe Paattile" (Bit)	P. Leela
2	"Thonippaattum"	M. G. Sreekumar & Chorus

== Trivia ==
- This is one of the rare Malayalam films of Priyadarshan without his friend and actor Mohanlal.
- Film maker V. K. Pavithran appeared in a cameo for Oru Muthassi Katha
- Malayalam script writer and actor Sreenivasan dubbed for Thiagarajan
