= Vellanakalude Nadu =

1988 Indian film by Priyadarshan

Vellanakalude Naadu
- Poster designed by Gayathri Ashokan
- Directed by: Priyadarshan
- Written by: Sreenivasan
- Produced by: Maniyanpilla Raju
- Starring: Mohanlal; Shobhana; Lizy
- Cinematography: S. Kumar
- Edited by: N. Gopalakrishnan
- Music by: M. G. Radhakrishnan(Songs); Johnson (score)
- Production company: Saraswathy Chaithanya
- Distributed by: Tharangini Films
- Release date: 9 December 1988
- Running time: 129 minutes
- Country: India
- Language: Malayalam
- Budget: ₹18 lakh (US$19,000)

Vellanakalude Nadu (transl. The land of white elephants) is a 1988 Indian Malayalam-language political satire crime film directed by Priyadarshan, written by Sreenivasan and produced by Maniyanpilla Raju. The film stars Mohanlal, Shobhana, Thikkurissy Sukumaran Nair, M. G. Soman, Sreenivasan, Karamana Janardanan Nair, Maniyanpilla Raju, Sukumari, K. P. A. C. Lalitha and Lizy. The film tells the story of contractor C. Pavithran who has obtained a road contract. This film was a critical and commercial success. Priyadarshan later remade the film in Hindi as Khatta Meeta, released in 2010.

== Plot ==
C Pavithran Nair AKA CP is a young construction contractor who strives hard to make a living between his family and employees. CP is an honest and upright man who stands no nonsense whatsoever but is forced into a bad situation because of society. His brother Radhakrishnan Nair is a successful contractor who has big contract works at hand, most of which he gained through unlawful ways. CP's brother-in-law Prabhakaran is also a successful Engineer working in the Municipality.

One day, a bridge constructed by CP's brother Radhakrishnan Nair collapses while a bus is on it and many people get killed. It is revealed it is because of Radhakrishnan Nair's greed that the bridge was built weak and therefore collapsed. To cover the issue, Nair, with the help of his brother-in-law Prabhakaran, devise a plan to put the responsibility on their driver's shoulders. The driver who is a poor man because of poor life conditions accepts to take the responsibility for the destruction of the bridge when he is promised by the corrupt men that his daughter will get a job in the municipality, along with a sum of money and of his safety . He is told to say to the police that he blew the bridge up with a bomb when his employers', i.e., Radhakrishnan Nair and family refused to raise his wages when he asked them to. Later, afraid of the driver revealing the truth, they, along with the help of corrupt politicians, kill him.

Meanwhile, when the bridge collapsed, a man named Sivan had lost his family (wife and son). He comes to these people one day and threatens them for what they did. One day, CP happens to meet his ex-girlfriend Radha at the Municipal office, who is now the Commissioner in the Municipal office. She is against CP's contract works since CP is trying to 'mix-water-in-milk' in his works. She asks him not to seize a road roller which he lost to the Municipality as compensation for damage to a culvert built by him. However, he wins the court case against the Municipal Office and gets back the road roller.

In his conversations with Radha, it is revealed that CP was a very active student in his college days and he was in love with Radha. One day in some disagreement on not partaking in a strike organized by CP, Radha is slapped by him and the relationship is broken there until it rekindles later. Coming to the present, we see the road-roller is not working properly. In order to repair it, his friend and assistant Gopi arranges for a mechanic named Sulaiman. Though boasting on his past, Sulaiman does not know the work properly. He keeps on telling CP that he will "repair it fast" (the famous catchphrase "Ippo sariyakkitharaam") but does not do so.

Finally, they arrange for an Elephant to pull the road roller, otherwise as Radha said, the Municipality would charge rent for not moving it away from its compound. The elephant, which is made to pull the road roller, slips the rope and despite the funny efforts of everyone, the road roller loses its control and hits the wall of Radha's house. It becomes a big problem and CP tries everything possible to stop it.

Police had been entering CP's house for many reasons which causes his father to lose trust over his son. CP's youngest sister Deepa gets a marriage proposal from an influential and corrupt politician who had helped Radhakrishnan and Prabhakaran during the Bridge-collapse case. The proposal is arranged by them who have professional interest to be fulfilled from this marriage. (CP's sister is later killed from what he believed from hearing that it was a blast of a stove, but the truth is that Deepa is raped by the friends of her politician- husband after which she commits suicides.)

The Municipality later decides to stop CP's construction contract works. CP thinks that this is Radha's plan and decides to take revenge on her. He sets her up in a fake bribery under the guise of a debt. Just after she receives the money, a Vigilance Team arrives at the scene and she is arrested. Later she tries to commit suicide, but is saved. She is then visited by CP, who tells his unfortunate story to her, situations which made him what he is now. The love rekindles between the two then. Sivan, who is now a Panchayat President, is a righteous person. He does an investigation on all illegal activities that pervade in different government offices, including CP's brother-in-law's.

CP learns of Sivan's good heart through Radha and he decides to live a truthful life from here onward. Sivan and CP meet and Sivan trusts CP. Meanwhile, the State Minister gets a letter requesting to announce an investigation on NREP projects which was misused by CP's brother and brother-in-law. Officers in Village Development Office try hard to make Sivan come to their terms so that they can misuse the fund with Sivan's help. CP is tried as a prop for this, however their plan goes in vain. One night Sivan is stabbed by people sent by CP's brother and brother-in-law. CP takes Sivan to hospital.

However, after telling CP of his efforts to bring people behind all evil things to the law and after detailing Deepa's ill fate, Sivan dies in CP's arms. Deepa's husband and his gang attempt to flee with Sivan's documents. But CP catches him red handed and they and CP defeats them in a fight. CP manages to save Sivan's documents detailing the crimes done by his relatives. He then publishes it and Deepa's husband, his assistants, and CP's brother and brother-in-law are punished by the law. In the end, after justifying his deeds and his earlier failures before his sister and sister-in law and other relatives who blame him for sending his own family members to jail and that makes CP absolutely furious, CP plans to leave his house just as he left while he was young. Just then, his law-abiding father stops CP and reaffirms his faith on his son by praising him for what he did. But CP leaves and is stopped by Radha, who promises to extend all support in the rest of his life and in his future ventures and tells him that the municipality is discussing about restarting CP'S contract works as it's his wish. So the contract works of CP are restarted and CP is a happy man. He and Radha become lovers again.

== Cast ==
- Mohanlal as C. Pavithran Nair aka C. P, the film protagonist who is a construction contractor
- Shobana as Radha, Pavithran's ex-girlfriend
- Thikkurissy Sukumaran Nair as Puthanpurackal Chandrashekharan Nair, Pavithran's father
- M. G. Soman as Prabhakaran Nair, Pavithran's brother-in-law
- Karamana Janardanan Nair as Radhakrishnan Nair, Pavithran's elder brother
- Sreenivasan as Panchayath President Sivadasan (Sivan)
- Maniyanpilla Raju as Gopi, C. P's friend and helper
- Jagadish as Kumaran, C. P's friend and helper
- Sukumari as Pavithran's mother
- K. P. A. C. Lalitha as Sarojam, Pavithran's sister-in-law
- Lissy as Deepa, Pavithran's younger sister and Gopi's love interest
- Nedumudi Venu as Minister (cameo)
- Kuthiravattom Pappu as Sulaiman
- C. I. Paul as Raghavan, Radha's brother
- Kunjandi as Driver Kuttan
- Pavithran as Sudhakaran
- Thodupuzha Vasanthi as Saudamini, Raghavan's wife
- Innocent as Balu, block officer
- Kunchan as Sundaran, C. P's advocate
- Augustine as Ganeshan, PWD engineer

== Production ==
Vellanakalude Nadu initially had a different screenplay which was supposed to be shot with actors such as Balan K. Nair, but just four days before the date of commencement of filming, Priyadarshan told Sreenivasan that he is not fully satisfied with the story and it needs to be changed. That day, the film's crew was staying at Maharani hotel in Kozhikode, a suggestion came that a story can be developed based on a scene in the short story collection Malgudi Days in which a road roller is pulled by an elephant. Sreenivasan was busy with the work of Ponmuttayidunna Tharavu in Guruvayur. Filming began without a screenplay, Sreenivasan told each day's scenes to be filmed via phone.

== Music ==
The film has only one song, "Paaduvaan Ormakalail", sung by M. G. Sreekumar and Sujatha Mohan, with music done by M. G. Radhakrishnan and lyrics by Kaithapram Damodaran Namboothiri.

== Reception ==
This film was a critical and commercial success and ran for over 150 days. The film's theme is noted for its still remaining relevance in the society. It is considered as a political satire on the municipal mafia and the ill-fated political system of governments. Mohanlal won the Kerala State Film Award – Special Jury Award for acting.

== Remake ==
In 2010, a Hindi remake titled Khatta Meetha was released, directed by Priyadarshan himself, starring Akshay Kumar and Trisha Krishnan.
