= Mazha Peyyunnu Maddalam Kottunnu =

- Poster
- Directed by: Priyadarshan
- Screenplay by: Sreenivasan
- Story by: Jagadish
- Produced by: Edappazhanji Velappan
- Starring: Mohanlal; Mukesh; Lissy; Sreenivasan; Jagathi Sreekumar; Kuthiravattam Pappu; Maniyanpilla Raju
- Cinematography: S. Kumar
- Edited by: N. Gopalakrishnan
- Music by: K. J. Joy
- Production company: Chithradesham Productions
- Distributed by: Saj Movies
- Release date: 25 January 1986
- Running time: 129 minutes
- Country: India
- Language: Malayalam

Mazha Peyyunnu Maddalam Kottunnu (transl. It is raining and Maddalam is playing) is a 1986 Indian Malayalam-language comedy film directed by Priyadarshan and written by Sreenivasan from a story by Jagadish. It stars an ensemble cast led by Mohanlal, Mukesh, Sreenivasan, Jagathi Sreekumar, Maniyanpilla Raju, Kuthiravattam Pappu, and Lissy. Mammootty appears in a brief cameo role. It was one of the highest-grossing Malayalam films of the year. It is now considered one of the best comedy films in Malayalam cinema. The film was remade in Telugu as Saradaga Kasepu (2010) and in Tamil as Manandhal Mahadevan (1989).

== Plot ==
Madhavan is back in Kerala after completing his business studies in the United States and now calls himself 'M. A. Dhavan'. His schoolmate, Shambhu, works as a chauffeur at his house and the now vain and snobbish Madhavan treats him with disdain. Madhavan's parents want him to marry Shobha, the only daughter of Sardar Krishna Kurup, a wealthy and aristocratic businessman. Madhavan, who wants to observe his bride-to-be from a distance, decides to go to her house disguised as the driver and gets his driver Shambu to impersonate him.

Just minutes after they set out, his parents telephone Krishna Kurup about their son's scheme. Various mishaps on the way end up with Madhavan deciding to visit as himself. Unaware of the change in plan, Krishna Kurup and his wife Thanakam treat Shambhu as the prospective groom and Madhavan as the driver. They dote over Shambhu, ignoring Madhavan, who is unaware of the impression that Kurup and his wife are under. The situation gets tougher for Madhavan due to his eccentric behavior towards the Kurup family. Shobha, who also mistakes Shambhu for the prospective fiancé, falls in love with him.

Meanwhile Sardar Koma Kurup has been in constant fight with his cousin Krishna Kurup for many years. Both are trying to capture power at the Nethaji Club, a reputed social club, for personal reasons. Damodaran, a.k.a. Damu, impersonates a lawyer, enters Koma Kurup's house, and wins his trust. Damu's real intention is to kill Koma Kurup, making it look like an accident and marry his daughter Aruna so that he can grab the whole property. But one after another, Damu's attempts to kill Koma Kurup fail. Damu nearly gets himself killed each time in the process. Then Shivan, in the guise of Damu's brother, arrives at Koma Kurup's house. Shivan, who is Damu and Shambu's friend, pretends to be a heart patient. He instantly succeeds in winning the heart of Aruna, destroying Damu's plans.

Thus the two love stories, one between Shambhu and Shobha and the other between Shivan and Aruna, bloom side by side. This chain of events pits Shambhu and Shivan against Madhavan and Damu, respectively. Unable to bear Shambhu's progress, Madhavan hires Kadathanatt Pappan Gurukkal a known goon to beat up Shambhu, but instead the goons themselves get beaten up by the adept Shambhu. This incident makes Shambhu go all out against Madhavan and he tries to force Krishna Kurup to conduct the marriage in three days. But then Madhavan's parents make a surprise visit to Sardar Krishna Kurup's house. They discover Shambhu's foul play. Krishna Kurup realizes his mistake and chases Shambhu away and decides to get Shobha married to Madhavan.

However, Shobha is in love with Shambhu and adamant that she will not marry Madhavan. The marriage venue and date are fixed. At the same time, Sardar Koma Kurup also finds out that his daughter is in love with Shivan, falls for Damu's words and drives Shivan out. At the marriage venue, both Shambhu and Shivan are denied entry. They then inform the police that Krishna Kurup has hidden gold at the marriage hall. The police enter the venue and a long fight packed with several comic incidents ensues. In the end, with the help of the police inspector, Shambhu marries Shobha and Shivan marries Aruna. Everything ends well and both couples start their married life with everyone's blessings including the dejected Madhavan and Damu.

== Cast ==
- Mohanlal as Shambu
- Mukesh as Shivan
- Sreenivasan as Madhavan / M A Dhavan
- Maniyanpilla Raju as Damu
- Jagathy Sreekumar as Sardar Krishna Kurup
- Kuthiravattam Pappu as Sardar Koma Kuruppu
- Lissy as Shobha
- Lalithasree as Thankam
- Priya as Aruna
- C. I. Paul as KT Nair
- Sukumari as Devaki
- Bahadoor as Jagannathan, Damu's uncle
- Poojappura Ravi as Chandrappan, a doctor
- Cochin Haneefa as Kadathanattu Pappan Gurukal
- Jagadish in a cameo appearance as a sub-inspector of police
- Mammootty as a comic guest who came for attending wedding

== Production ==
The story of this film was by Jagadish.

== Soundtrack ==
The music was composed by K. J. Joy and the lyrics were written by Panthalam Sudhakaran.

No.	Song	Singers	Length (m:ss)
1	"Dhanumaasakkulirala"	P. Jayachandran, K. S. Chithra, Chorus	
2	"Thumbi Manchaleri Vaa"	M. G. Sreekumar, Lathika	

== Reception ==
Upon release, this film was a huge hit at the box office. It is a senseless comedy flick without a strong plot or any emotional scenes. It is usually categorized as one of the best comedy films to have ever made in Malayalam cinema. The repeated telecasts on TV channels have made it a cult film.
