= Kyon Ki =

2005 Indian film by Priyadarshan

- Theatrical release poster
- Directed by: Priyadarshan
- Written by: Story and Screenplay: Priyadarshan; Dialogues: Sanjay Chhel
- Based on: Thalavattam by Priyadarshan
- Produced by: Mukesh Talreja; Sunil Manchanda
- Starring: Salman Khan; Jackie Shroff; Kareena Kapoor; Rimi Sen; Om Puri
- Cinematography: Tirru
- Edited by: Arun Kumar; N. Gopalakrishnan
- Music by: Songs: Himesh Reshammiya; Score: S. P. Venkatesh
- Production companies: Orion Pictures; MAD Entertainment Ltd.
- Release date: November 3, 2005
- Running time: 156 minutes
- Country: India
- Language: Hindi
- Budget: ₹21 crore
- Box office: ₹23.15 crore

Kyon Ki (transl. Because) is a 2005 Indian Hindi-language romantic drama film written and directed by Priyadarshan and produced by Sunil Manchanda and Mukesh Talreja. It is a remake of Priyadarshan's own 1986 Malayalam film Thalavattam (1986) which in turn was inspired by the 1975 film One Flew Over the Cuckoo's Nest an adaptation of Ken Kesey's 1962 novel of the same name. The film stars Salman Khan, Kareena Kapoor, Jackie Shroff, Rimi Sen and Om Puri in pivotal roles. It tells the story of Anand, a mental hospital patient whose past draws a female doctor, Tanvi, close to him, testing her own beliefs and challenging her authoritarian father, the administrator of the sanatorium in which Anand has been admitted to.

Some portions were filmed in Romania, Ooty and Chennai. It clashed with Garam Masala, also directed by Priyadarshan. While the critical reception was negative upon its release, the film has since earned a cult status due to its storyline, cast performances, and soundtrack.

== Plot ==
Sir Richard's Mental Sanatorium is run by the strict and authoritative Doctor Jogichand Khurana, along with the other two main doctors, Sunil and Tanvi Khurana, who is the daughter of Khurana. Tanvi has treated a female patient who wears no. 36; her process of doing so has always been caring and gentle, rebelling against Khurana's inhumane ways of dealing with mentally ill patients. As she gets discharged, Tanvi doesn't get acknowledged for her efforts, which devastate her and since then, she has become embittered and vows to never come close to any patient, especially no. 36.

A young man, Anand Sharma, is brought to the mental sanatorium by a court order. His elder brother requests the doctors to admit him immediately. However, they insist on evaluating his mental condition before taking any decision. On being asked a few questions, Anand does not show any signs of insanity, and the doctors conclude that there is nothing wrong with him. Just then, Anand spots a housefly on the table. He tries to capture it but it evades him. While Anand's brother insists with the doctors, Anand suddenly becomes very violent, picking up a club and using it to hit everything the fly lands on. This convinces the doctors that he is indeed insane, and they finally admit him.

Anand tries to make friends with other patients in the sanatorium. Sunil develops a caring bond with Anand, as it is revealed that Sunil was made a doctor by Anand's father. Anand makes a commotion almost every day and acts childish which upsets Tanvi and she demands that Anand is thrown out from the asylum.

Sunil finds Anand's diary and gives it to Tanvi, who finds out about Anand's sad past after reading his diary. Anand was a musician in college who was deeply in love with Maya, a young, vivacious nun in Romania. Maya, who was apprised of his feelings, however, did not reciprocate her love towards Anand, leaving him conflicted. To get her to respond, Anand threatened to commit suicide on the rooftop of the church by pretending to set fire on himself one day, resulting in Maya attempting to stop him and therefore ending up confessing her love towards him. Anand was delighted with the turn of events and having been contented with his lady love, planned to marry her. Maya turned out to be roguish and enjoyed her time with Anand, which she eventually got used to by throwing a series of pranks on Anand, such as pretending to have trouble riding a horse and nearly getting in an accident, only to later reveal that she can perfectly ride a horse after Anand got worried or when she was insisted by Anand to drive a car and she revealed she can't drive and rushing it across a populated street and nearly crashing it into the road when he persisted her to try, only to reveal later that she knew how to drive perfectly and was simply messing with him. Anand plotted to get back at her playfully and pranked her back by throwing her into a swimming pool, to which she heavily resisted, and warned Anand explaining that she cannot swim but Anand refused to believe her thinking it's just another one of her elaborate pranks and left her in the water, but it turned out she wasn't lying and indeed couldn't swim. As a result, Anand came back to see that Maya had drowned; his life was completely shattered. He became traumatized, blaming himself for Maya's death.

After finding out this secret, Tanvi feels guilty for her treatment towards Anand and apologizes to him. They become good friends, spend time together, and she and Sunil work together to cure Anand and make him remember his past. This works, and Anand completely gets over the trauma of Maya's death and is finally cured. He decides to leave the asylum but stays when Tanvi expresses her love to him. He reciprocates her love and the two are happy with each other. But fate plays a part in the story; Tanvi has already fallen in love with Anand but is engaged to Karan, under her father, Khurana's approval.

When Khurana finds out about Tanvi and Anand, he is livid as he sees this as a doctor-patient relationship, not a genuine relationship from a father's point of view. He demands Tanvi to leave him but she refuses to back down. When Karan finds out, he tells Tanvi to go with Anand. Sunil tries to make Khurana see that mental asylum patients should be treated with love, care, and affection, but Khurana stubbornly believes that patients should be treated with oppression and brutality. Anand rebels against the strict hospital regime and Khurana's disapproval of Tanvi and Anand, but he refuses to back down. This makes Anand explode into a violent rage against Khurana, which results in Khurana lobotomizing him. Seeing no way out, Sunil and Tanvi arrive at the asylum to smuggle Anand out so that he and Tanvi can run away together, but it is too late when Sunil finds out about Anand's lobotomy. Realizing he is better off dead, Sunil sorrowfully kills his neurologically disabled friend by suffocating him with a pillow. After Sunil confesses to Khurana about the act of euthanasia, Tanvi becomes insane after knowing about news about Anand's death. She is admitted as a patient in the same asylum and the same number Anand had, no. 36. Dr. Khurana is shown to be feeling guilty of losing his own daughter to a patient in the same asylum.

== Cast ==
- Salman Khan as Anand Sharma
- Kareena Kapoor as Dr. Tanvi Khurana
- Rimi Sen as Maya Sahani, Anand's deceased girlfriend. (guest appearance)
- Jackie Shroff as Dr. Sunil Pradhan
- Suniel Shetty as Karan Kashyap, Tanvi's fiance.(guest appearance)
- Om Puri as Dr. Jogichand Khurana, Tanvi's father.
- Manoj Joshi as Paramveer Kumar "PK" Narayan
- Anil Dhawan as Deepak Sharma, Anand's elder brother
- Asrani as Manmohit Chandran, an asylum patient
- Arun Bakshi as Indrajit Swami, an asylum patient
- Javed Khan as Somnath Vidbharti, an asylum patient
- Kurush Deboo as Manvir "Munna" Chabbre a.k.a. Idiot, an asylum patient
- Kavi Kumar Azad as Abdul Malik, an asylum patient
- Atul Parchure as Michael Jaykar, an asylum patient
- Nagesh Bhonsle as Anthony Gonsalves
- Shaurya Chauhan as mental hospital nurse
- Saurabh Dubey as Church Priest

== Release and reception ==
Kyon Ki released on 3 November 2005 to coincide with the festival of Diwali in India. It performed poorly at the box office and grossed over ₹231 million worldwide. Another Priyadarshan-directed film was released on the same day, the comedy Garam Masala which was commercially successful at the box office, grossing over ₹546 million.

The film received generally negative reviews from critics. Urvashi Asharl of The Times of India commented that the film was "a huge disappointment" as it had a predictable and dull plot with too many songs but praised the performances of Salman Khan, Kareena Kapoor, and Jackie Shroff. Rediff.com reviewer Patcy N. also felt that there were too many songs and criticised the script and slow pacing of the film. Namrata Joshi writing for the magazine Outlook wrote that the central romance between Khan and Kapoor was not believable and criticised the acting and script saying "all the actors just sleepwalk through their ill-sketched roles". She also described the depiction of violence against mentally ill patients as therapy in the film as "offensive to say the least".

A group of psychiatrists in Mumbai referred the film to the National Human Rights Commission of India asking for certain scenes to be removed. They felt that the film's depiction of mentally ill patients and their treatment was derogatory and misleading.

== Soundtrack ==
=== Score ===
The film score was composed by S. P. Venkatesh.

Kyon Ki

Soundtrack album by Himesh Reshammiya
- Released: 2005
- Genre: Feature film soundtrack
- Label: T-Series
- Producer: Himesh Reshammiya

Himesh Reshammiya chronology
Koi Aap Sa (2005)	Kyon Ki (2005)	Vaah! Life Ho Toh Aisi (2005)

=== Songs ===
Himesh Reshammiya composed all the songs featured in the film. The lyrics were penned by Sameer. According to the Indian trade website Box Office India, with around 13,00,000 units sold, this film's soundtrack album was the year's fourteenth highest-selling.

Songs
No.	Title	Singer(s)	Length
1.	"Kyon Ki Itna Pyar"	Udit Narayan & Alka Yagnik	5:56
2.	"Dil Keh Raha Hai"	Kunal Ganjawala	5:06
3.	"Dil Ke Badle Sanam"	Udit Narayan & Alka Yagnik	4:17
4.	"Jhatka Maare"	Udit Narayan, Shaan & Kailash Kher	6:20
5.	"Kyon Ki Itna Pyar" (female)	Alka Yagnik	5:42
6.	"Aa Jee Le Ik Pal Mein"	Udit Narayan & Alka Yagnik	4:44
7.	"Kyon Ki Itna Pyar" (II)	Udit Narayan & Radha	5:56
8.	"Dil Keh Raha Hai" (remix)	Kunal Ganjawala	4:41
9.	"Kyon Ki Itna Pyar" (III)	Udit Narayan & Alka Yagnik	5:54
Total length:			48:36
