= Vikram (1986 Tamil film) =

1986 film directed by Rajasekhar

- Theatrical release poster
- Directed by: Rajasekhar
- Screenplay by: Kamal Haasan; Sujatha
- Story by: Sujatha
- Produced by: Kamal Haasan; Chandrahasan
- Starring: Kamal Haasan; Sathyaraj; Lissy; Dimple Kapadia; Amjad Khan; Charuhasan; Janagaraj
- Cinematography: V Ranga; S. M Anwar (Special Effect Photograph)
- Edited by: R. Vittal; C. Lancy
- Music by: Ilaiyaraaja
- Production company: Raaj Kamal Films International
- Release date: 29 May 1986
- Country: India
- Language: Tamil
- Budget: ₹1.5 crore
- Box office: ₹8 crore

Vikram is a 1986 Indian Tamil-language action spy film directed by Rajasekhar and written by Kamal Haasan and Sujatha. The film stars Haasan, Sathyaraj, Amjad Khan, Lissy, Dimple Kapadia, Charuhasan and Janagaraj. It is the first Indian film to use computer for recording the songs. The screenplay was first published as a serial in the magazine Kumudam. Both Lissy and Kapadia made their Tamil debut through this film.

Although the film was not well received by critics, it performed well at the box office and turned out to be a commercially successful venture for Raaj Kamal Films International. A spiritual successor with the same name was released in 2022, with Haasan reprising his role of the title character.

== Plot ==
On 15 March, Ashraf Hussain, Francis Adaikalaraj, RD Bohra are convicted and sentenced to 25 years' imprisonment for their involvement in various anti-national activities. Being unremorseful, the convicts play Chinese checkers while the judge sentences them. Approaching the escort van, one of the convicts boisterously boasts to the press of becoming free soon. The next day, a nuclear-capable ICBM, Agni Putra, is being dispatched from an unknown location to Satish Dhawan Space Centre, Sriharikota only to be stolen by Sugirtharaja and his henchmen.

Back in Headquarters, a visibly distraught panel of ministers and military top brass, led by Mr. Rao, chief of the RAW mulls over the dangerous prospects of the missile falling into terrorists' hands and finally picks the now off-duty agent, Commander Arun Kumar Vikram aka Vikram to locate the Agni Putra, with some resentment. The Secretary in the office, Thangaraj, eavesdrops on the mission briefing and passes the information to Sugirtharaja, who sends a henchman to kill Vikram. The plan fails as Vikram's three-month-pregnant wife, Ambika, accidentally gets shot by the sniper.

Enraged, Vikram returns to duty and rebukes Rao for the costly leak and deftly exposes Thangaraj. After torture, Thangaraj names Sugirtharaja as the mastermind in front of the panel, and jumps to his death without giving further details. Desperate to find the missile, which is designed to auto-ignite within 10 days, Rao introduces Vikram to a computer expert Preethi, who knows the design of Agni Putra's on-board computer and its functions. Initially annoyed with Vikram's brutal ways, she mellows down eventually. Sugirtharaja's henchman destroys all the evidence at Thangaraj's home, before Vikram and Preethi arrive.

The ensuing chase ends at a cinema theatre, playing a documentary news reel about India-Salamia friendship, where Vikram spots Sugirtharaja. Upon investigation, Vikram realises that the Kingdom of Salamia discourages intel-sharing with India. With the diplomatic route ruled out, Vikram and Preethi, disguising as folk artists, embark along with a troupe to Salamia, ruled by Sultan. After being saved from a snakebite by Vikram, Salamia's princess and Sultan's sister, Inimaasi falls for him. Though Preethi is constantly put off by Vikram's arrogance, she falls for him too.

Vikram identifies the location of the missile and also discovers that the high priest is a mere puppet under Sugirtharaja's directions, who secretly reprograms the missile, while Preethi is caught by the guards. Preethi, then siding with Sugirtharaja, pretends to be cheated by Vikram and passes information to him, unbeknownst to Sugirtharaja. While trying to reprogram the on-board computer, he loses the information and inadvertently forays into a spa, where he meets Inimaasi. His attempts to expose the priest's treason are met with sheer dissent. The Sultan catches the couple, suspecting fornication, and sentences Vikram to be decapitated in public.

Escaping execution, Vikram flees towards the desert, where a gun-toting Sugirtharaja and the Royal Sentries chase him until he gives in to dehydration and is left to die, when he is bitten by a black cobra. Back at the Royal Palace, the high priest stages a coup and holds the Sultan at gunpoint. Meanwhile, Inimaasi manages to escape and finds the delirious Vikram in the desert, and nurses him back. The couple then return to the palace and fight off the armed sentries, while the Sultan impales the high priest. Sugirtharaja, oblivious to the fact that Agni Putra's on-board computer has been tweaked, launches it, hoping to decimate New Delhi.

At HQ, the Indian officials observe in despair as their computer screen shows a 2D animation of Agni Putra slowly descending upon New Delhi, only for the missile to later drift and plunge into the Bay of Bengal, disarming automatically. Back in Salamia, the royal guards sabotage the siege and restore order. A disillusioned Sugirtharaja forces Preethi into a glider plane and takes off. Vikram manages to board the plane using a lasso through skids.

While scuffling, Sugirtharaja sets-off a bomb and jumps with the only parachute backpack available, strapped-on. As the plane explodes, Vikram and Preethi jump-off in a free fall and reach out to Sugirtharaja and grab his parachute, leading to his eventual death, through free fall. Afterwards, Vikram and Preethi get intimate mid-air and as they touch the ground, Inimaasi arrives, calling out to Vikram. Preethi, too, calls him. In a dilemma, Vikram frivolously runs away from both of them.

== Cast ==
- Kamal Haasan as Commander Arun Kumar Vikram aka A. K. Vikram, commander of the 1986 Pilot Black Ops Squad and a RAW agent.
- Sathyaraj as Sugirtharaj, an international criminal mastermind.
- Lissy as Preethi, a communications specialist and a computer expert. She is an alumna of IIT Madras and a graduate in Computer engineering (voiceover by Radhika Sarathkumar)
- Dimple Kapadia as Inimaasi, Princess and sister of Sultan, Kingdom of Salamia.
- Amjad Khan as the Sultan, Kingdom of Salamia, a fictional kingdom (presumably in Central Asia)
- Charuhasan as Mr. Rao, chief of Research and Analysis Wing
- Janagaraj as Dubash, Tamil translator in Salamia
- Manorama as Pallathor Ramadevi, Consort of Sultan, Kingdom of Salamia
- Vikram Dharma as a sniper (Sugirtharaja's henchman)
- Sabu Cyril
- V. K. Ramasamy as a Union Minister
- T. S. Raghavendra as Thangaraj, a secretary at the Research and Analysis Wing office. A double agent for Sugirtharaj
- Prathapachandran as a Police officer
- R. S. Shivaji as Bohra, one of Sugirtharaja's henchmen
- L. Raja as Hussain, one of Sugirtharaja's henchmen
- Banerjee as Francis, one of Sugirtharaja's henchmen
- Ambika as Vikram's wife (cameo appearance)

== Production ==
Vikram was the second production venture of Kamal Haasan's Raaj Kamal Films International, after Raja Paarvai. The screenplay was first published as a serial in the magazine Kumudam. On multiple occasions, Haasan has mentioned that during the story discussion and pre-production of Vikram, Mani Ratnam was his first choice to direct this film. However, things did not work out due to the fact that Ratnam was an untested director at that point of time, in terms of big budgeted commercial films. Vikram was the first Tamil film to have a budget of over ₹1 crore (equivalent to ₹14 crore or US$1.4 million in 2023), and features a constructed language spoken in the fictional country Salamia. The language was created by Haasan. The scenes set in Salamia were filmed in Rajasthan. The makers hired 125 camels and 65 horses for the film. Other filming locations were Jaisalmer Palace and rat temple situated in Deshnoke near Bikaner. Charuhasan's character was inspired by M from the James Bond series.

== Soundtrack ==
The soundtrack was composed by Ilaiyaraaja. This is the first Indian soundtrack album recorded through computer. The song "Sippikkul Oru Muthu" did not feature in the film. For the dubbed Telugu version Agent Vikram 007, lyrics were written by Rajasri.

Tamil track listing
No.	Title	Lyrics	Singer(s)	Length
1.	"Vikram Vikram"	Vairamuthu	Kamal Haasan, S. Janaki	4:49
2.	"Vanithamani"	Vairamuthu	S. P. Balasubrahmanyam, S. Janaki, Kamal Haasan	4:54
3.	"Sippikkul Oru Muthu"	Vairamuthu	K. J. Yesudas, S. Janaki	4:42
4.	"En Jodi Manja Kuruvi"	Gangai Amaran	S. P. Balasubrahmanyam, S. P. Sailaja, K. S. Chithra, Gangai Amaran	4:48
5.	"Meendum Meendum Vaa"	Vaali	S. P. Balasubrahmanyam, S. Janaki	5:06
Total length:				24:19

Telugu (dubbed) track listing
No.	Title	Singer(s)	Length
1.	"Vikram"	S. P. Balasubrahmanyam
2.	"Naa Jodi Palaguvva"	S. P. Balasubrahmanyam, S. P. Sailaja
3.	"Vanithamani"	S. P. Balasubrahmanyam, S. P. Sailaja
4.	"Vayasu Pilichindi"	S. P. Balasubrahmanyam, S. P. Sailaja

== Release and reception ==
Vikram was released on 29 May 1986. The film's Telugu version had to be retitled to avoid confusion with the Telugu Vikram. Jayamanmadhan (a duo) of Kalki wrote despite the script having glaring loopholes it can be forgiven; however they felt when the film shifts to Salamia, the second quarter of the film moves at a camel's pace. The duo concluded the review saying fine this film was talked about, but the question is whether the film is a talking point is a question. Ananda Vikatan rated the film 42 out of 100.

According to Haasan, Vikram was unfavourably reviewed by film critics, but became a "commercial hit". Haasan donated the proceeds of the film's first show to UNICEF, who were then collecting funds for the welfare of underprivileged children in Africa.

== Spiritual successor ==
In 2022, Kamal Haasan reprised his role of Vikram in the spiritual successor with the same name written and directed by Lokesh Kanagaraj.
