= Aram + Aram = Kinnaram =

1985 film

- Directed by: Priyadarshan
- Screenplay by: Sreenivasan
- Based on: Pasand Apni Apni by Basu Chatterjee; Naram Garam by Hrishikesh Mukherjee
- Produced by: Geetha Mathew
- Starring: Shankar; Mohanlal; Sreenivasan; Jagathi Sreekumar; Lissy; Maniyanpilla Raju
- Cinematography: S. Kumar
- Edited by: V. P. Krishnan
- Music by: Reghu Kumar
- Production company: Centenary Productions
- Distributed by: Gandhimathi Release
- Release date: 9 August 1985
- Country: India
- Language: Malayalam
- Budget: ₹7 lakh (US$8,300)

Aram + Aram = Kinnaram is a 1985 Indian Malayalam-language slapstick comedy film directed by Priyadarshan and written by Sreenivasan. It stars Shankar, Mohanlal, Lissy and Puja Saxena.

The plot element is inspired by 2 Hindi films - Naram Garam and Pasand Apni Apni (which itself is inspired by the English film Happy Go Lovely). A famous hotel comedy sequence from this movie was reused by Priyadarshan in his 2005 Hindi movie Garam Masala.

== Plot ==
The story revolves around two friends—Narayanan Kutty and Balan. Working as a mechanic at K & K Automobiles in Chennai, Narayanan Kutty is flirtatious. Although he has never been successful in wooing any girl, he loves boasting cooked up stories about his encounters with rich girls in and around the city. Manoharan, the proprietor of K & K Automobiles, always falls in deep trouble because of the careless attitude of Narayanan Kutty at the work place. Balan, his roommate, a jobless chap is in all efforts to find a job with the help of Narayanan Kutty, as he has to marry Ammukutty, his love interest in the village.

From the driver of M. N. Nambiar, the owner of Continental Group, Narayanan Kutty finds out that Nambiar is always sympathetic to leukemia patients and will do anything to support them, as he himself was a former survived patient. Balan meets Nambiar and successfully fools him by claiming to be a leukemia patient, who is in deep financial trouble. Balan is offered a job at the company as an attender.

In the meantime, Narayanan Kutty himself spreads a gossip that he is the fiancé of Mala, the daughter of M. N. Nambiar. Sujatha, a close buddy of Mala impostors Mala and contact Narayanan Kutty, with the knowledge of Mala. As a part of a plan to fool him, Mala approaches him as Sujatha, who disguise as a news reporter to interview him about his relationship with the daughter of Nambiar. Soon, Narayanan Kutty falls in love with Mala, whom he believes to be Sujatha. Things get complicated for him as she also reciprocates in the same manner.

On the other hand, the life of Balan was going too smoothly until the parents of his fiancée arrive in the city along with her to see his office. Balan, who is actually a peon at the office had lied to them that he is the manager of the company. Gopi Krishnan (whose original name is Thankappan and he gets angry when he is called so) and Saravanan are two employees in M. N. Nambiar's office who are in constant fight. Balan tries to use Gopi Krishnan against Saravanan who tries to fall in love with Ammukutty. To add more trouble, Nambiar decides to marry again, to which his daughter objects vehemently, inviting more clashes. Ammukutty's parents decide not to marry Ammukutty to Balan upon finding out he is the peon. Gopi Krishnan and Saravanan hire goondas to kidnap Ammukutty and marry her, and they fight. Balan arrives at the right time. Meanwhile, Narayanan Kutty and Mala marry. Balan saves Ammukutty from Gopi Krishnan and Saravanan and marries her.

== Cast ==
- Shankar as Balan
- Mohanlal as Narayanan Kutty, Balan's Friend
- Pooja Saxena as Mala, Narayanan Kutty's Love Interest
- Lissy as Sujatha, Mala's Friend
- Sreenivasan as Gopi Krishnan/Thankappan
- Jagathy Sreekumar as Manoharan
- Maniyanpilla Raju as Saravanan
- Sukumari as Karthiyayani, Balan's Aunt
- Thilakan as M. N. Nambiar, Mala's Father
- Innocent as M. N. Nambiar's Driver
- C. I. Paul as Balan's Uncle
- Kundara Johny as Ashokan, Goonda
- Ragini as Ammukutty, Balan's Fiancée
- Sunitha Sharma as Maggie
- James as Govindan, a mechanic
- Pavithran as Mechanic Joseph
- Bobby Kottarakkara as waiter at restaurant

== Production ==
The film was made on a small budget compared to other films at that time, just close to ₹7 lakh (equivalent to ₹1.0 crore or US$120,000 in 2023).

== Soundtrack ==
The music was composed by Raghu Kumar, lyrics were written by Poovachal Khader.

No.	Song	Singer(s)	Lyrics	Length
1	"Poru Neeyen Devi"	K. J. Yesudas	Poovachal Khader	
2	"Premichu Poy Ninne"	P. Jayachandran, Unni Menon, Miss Reddy	Poovachal Khader	
