= Malamaal Weekly =

2006 Indian film by Priyadarshan

- Theatrical release poster
- Directed by: Priyadarshan
- Screenplay by: Aishwarya Kaushik
- Story by: Aishwarya Kaushik
- Produced by: Suresh Balaje
- Starring: Paresh Rawal; Om Puri; Riteish Deshmukh; Arbaaz Khan; Rajpal Yadav; Asrani
- Narrated by: Naseeruddin Shah
- Cinematography: Sameer Arya
- Edited by: N. Gopalakrishnan; Arun Kumar
- Music by: Songs: Javed Ali; Score: Uttankk V. Vorra; Kannan
- Production companies: Percept Picture Company; Sahara One Motion Pictures
- Distributed by: Sahara One Motion Pictures
- Release date: 10 March 2006
- Running time: 160 minutes
- Country: India
- Language: Hindi
- Budget: ₹7 crore
- Box office: ₹42.76 crore

Malamaal Weekly is a 2006 Indian Hindi-language comedy film written and directed by Priyadarshan starring Paresh Rawal, Om Puri, Riteish Deshmukh, Arbaaz Khan, Rajpal Yadav and Asrani. The film received mixed reviews from critics, but was successful at the box office, grossing ₹42.7 crore against a budget of ₹7 crore. Based on Waking Ned (1998), the film was remade in Telugu in the same year as Bhagyalakshmi Bumper Draw (2006), in Kannada as Dakota Picture (2012) and in Malayalam by same director as Aamayum Muyalum (2014).

== Plot ==
The film takes place in the impoverished village of Laholi, where, following droughts, most of the villagers' possessions are mortgaged to the local Thakurani Karamkali. One of the few entertainments the villagers can afford is the lottery, Malaamal Weekly (malamal is Hindi for 'rich').

Lilaram is the only educated man in the village. He has the job of intermediary between the lottery organization and the village, for which he receives a commission whenever a villager wins; thus, he has a relatively good but volatile income. One day he reads the winning lottery numbers and realizes that one of the tickets has won the top prize of one crore (10 million Indian currency or about $160,000, a relative fortune in rural India). He devises a plan to obtain the winning ticket and present it to the commission as his own. He hosts a dinner (mortgaging his wife's beloved pet goat Gattu, who is like a child to her, to the Thakurani to pay for it) and invites all the villagers who play the lottery, but the man he is looking for does not turn up. By elimination, he deduces that the winner is Anthony, the town drunk, and reasons that he didn't turn up because he knew that he had won the top prize. Hoping to at least extract his commission, he goes to Anthony's house and finds him dead, the winning ticket clutched in his hand and a happy expression on his face.

Lilaram attempts to pry the ticket from Anthony's fingers but is thwarted by Anthony's body in rigor mortis. Lilaram eventually succeeds in freeing it with a knife; at this point Ballu, the local dairy farmer, enters the house and discovers him standing over Anthony's corpse with what appears to be the murder weapon in his hand. Lilaram tells Ballu the truth and convinces him to remain silent in exchange for sharing the lottery winnings between them. Soon they are encountered by Ballu's unfortunate assistant, Kanhaiya, who has had a hard time following Ballu's orders. He has emotional involvement with Ballu's daughter, Sukhmani. On Ballu's promise that if he also joins them, he would marry Sukhmani to him, he agrees to join the two of them.

Unfortunately for them, before dying Anthony managed to call the lottery commission and give his name and address, as well as his sister and several people to whom he owed money, to tell them of his good fortune. The secret soon becomes impossible to keep, and Lilaram must figure out how to fool the lottery inspector, who is on his way to the village to interview Anthony. To cover up the whole incident as per the plan of Lilaram, Ballu acted as living Antony, and the inspector became satisfied. After that, Ballu, Kanhaiya, and Lilaram are introduced to a solitary man named Joseph, as Kanhaiya also fails to hide Anthony's body but has a secret romance with Sukhmani. All of them successfully buried Antony, but unfortunately, Bajbahadur, aka Bajey, brother of Thakurani, knew their secret plan and Antony's death case. He started threatening them. Some days later, Chokeylal Kanhaiya's father comes to the village and hears of Kanhaiya's insolence, which prompts him to lock his son in Ballu's barn because Kanhaiya is obstructing the plan of getting money from the lottery. Sukhmani attempts suicide the day after, which makes Ballu reconsider freeing Kanhaiya only to find out that he had already escaped. Later, Gattu is sold by Thakurani to the butchers, and Leela and his wife come to know about this and are heartbroken. At night, Lilaram, Ballu, Chokey, and Joseph manage to catch Baje. But they fail to kidnap Bajey and accidentally kidnap Joseph by mistake. Bajey was kidnapped by another gang from a nearby village due to their vendetta.

After a few days, the said lottery inspector comes to the village and gives the demand draft to Ballu. When he is returning, Thakurani and Bajey's gang try to catch him up to inform him of the real fact of Antony's lottery ticket. Ballu, Lilaram, Kanhaiya, and the rest of the villagers try to stop Thakurani and Bajey, ensuing a chaotic chase. Just when Thakurani catches up with the lottery inspector's car, he hits her motorcycle, and Thakurani plunges to death in the town river. The villagers let the inspector go in exchange for a promise that he would not say a word to anyone. The movie ends with everyone getting rich except for Bajey, who becomes a beggar.

== Cast ==
- Paresh Rawal as Lilaram aka Leela
- Om Puri as Balwant Singh Ballu / Fake Joseph Anthony Fernandes
- Ritesh Deshmukh as Kanhaiya
- Arbaaz Khan as Jayesh Agarwal, the lottery inspector
- Rajpal Yadav as Bajey Singh Bajbahadur
- Asrani as Chokheylal, Kanhaiya's father
- Shakti Kapoor as Joseph
- Sudha Chandran as Thakurain
- Reema Sen as Sukhmani
- Rasika Joshi as Mary
- Sona Nair as Tara (Lilaram's wife)
- Rakhi Sawant as an item number "Kismat Se Chalti Hai"
- Innocent as Joseph Anthony Fernandes (Tiku Talsania as the Hindi dubbing voice)

Uncredited

- Major Ravi as Census Officer
- Viplav Sahu as Panchayat Head Officer

== Production ==
The film was initially titled Hai Yeh Paisa. This movie was shot on a village set near Karaikudi, Tamil Nadu.

== Soundtrack ==
Malamaal Weekly

Soundtrack album by Javed Ali
- Released: 10 March 2006 (Film)
- Recorded: 2006
- Genre: Feature Film soundtrack
- Length: 28:11
- Language: Hindi
- Label: Sangeet Music
- Producer: Javed Ali

Javed Ali chronology
Dhoom 2 (2006)	Malamaal Weekly (2006)	Golmaal Fun Unlimited (2006)

Official audio
- Malamaal Weekly - Full Album on YouTube

All tracks are written by Javed Ali.

Track-List
No.	Title	Singer(s)	Length
1.	"Hansani O Meri Hansani"	Shreya Ghoshal, chorus
2.	"Kismat Se Chalti Hai"	Vaishali Samant, Nitin Raikwar
3.	"Sar Sar Sar Sarti Hava"	Mahalakshmi Iyer
4.	"Sun Mere Mitwa"	Karsan Sagathia
5.	"Yeh Ajooba"	Javed Ali Mahalakshmi Iyer
6.	"Hansani O Meri Hansani – Remix"	Vaishali Samant
7.	"Yeh Ajooba – Remix"	Mahalakshmi Iyer Javed Ali
Total length:			28:11

== Release ==
The film was released on 10 March 2006.

=== Critical reception ===
The Hindustan Times was broadly positive about Malaamal Weekly, with two reviewers awarding it two and three stars but lauding "the sheer pleasure" of Rawal and Puri's comic performances. Most reviewers, however, were more negative. The BBC gave the film two out of five stars, citing a "weak script" and saying that the humour of Waking Ned had been "lost in translation." Molodezhnaja.ch concurred, repeatedly complaining that the film was too long, had only one song and the rest consisting of "repetitive scenes, long, no, endless dialogue and a poor finale," giving it 2.5 stars on the basis of "a few laughs and solid casting." It did at least give the single song credit for "breaking up the otherwise monotonous events"; Rediff.com described it as "the worst Bollywood song ever" in addition to summing the film up as "simply pathetic."

=== Box office ===
Made on a budget of ₹7 crore, the film grossed ₹42.7 crore worldwide.

== Remakes ==
Year	Title	Language	Director
2006	Bhagyalakshmi Bumper Draw	Telugu	Nidhi Prasad
2012	Dakota Picture	Kannada	Om Prakash Rao
2014	Aamayum Muyalum	Malayalam	Priyadarshan

== Sequel ==
A sequel was planned later, which was directed by Priyadarshan, the title of Kamaal Dhamaal Malamaal. It starred Shreyas Talpade, Nana Patekar, Paresh Rawal, Om Puri, Dr.Rajeev Pillai and Rajpal Yadav; the rest of the cast.

== See also ==
- Waking Ned
- Filmography of Priyadarshan
