= Dheem Tharikida Thom =

1986 film by Priyadarshan

- Directed by: Priyadarshan
- Screenplay by: V. R. Gopalakrishnan
- Story by: Priyadarshan
- Based on: Happy Go Lovely by Bruce Humberstone
- Produced by: Anand
- Starring: Maniyan Pillai Raju; Lizy; Mukesh; Nedumudi Venu; Shankar
- Cinematography: S. Kumar
- Edited by: N. Gopalakrishnan
- Music by: Songs: M. G. Radhakrishnan; Score: Johnson
- Production company: Anand Movie Arts
- Distributed by: Gandhimathi Release
- Release date: 2 January 1986
- Country: India
- Language: Malayalam

Dheem Tharikida Thom is a 1986 Indian Malayalam-language comedy film directed by Priyadarshan. This film is about an innocent young man joining a ballet team just to express his love towards the main actress. Maniyan Pillai Raju and Lizy appears in the leading roles, supported by Mukesh, Nedumudi Venu, Sreenivasan, Jagathi Sreekumar and Shankar. The story is adapted from the 1951 British musical comedy film Happy Go Lovely.

== Plot ==
Siva Subrahmaniam aka Subru, an innocent bank employee is in love with Rohini, but is afraid to express his love to her. His grandmother wants him to be a celibate Brahmachari and become a priest at the nearby temple. Rohini is working as an artist at the Keerikkad ballet troupe run by Keerikkad Chellappan Pillai.

Subru joins the ballet troupe to woo Rohini after taking the advice of Sankaran Pillai, Chellappan Nair's assistant. She is attracted to his innocent and straightforward behavior and falls in love with him. One day when she misses her bus, Rohini asks a car driver for a lift, and she is dropped at the ballet troupe office without any knowledge that the car belongs to Suresh Menon, a rich business tycoon in the area. Sankaran and Chellappan mistake her to be in love with Suresh Menon.

In order to appease Suresh Menon and get him to invest in the troupe, Chellappan offers the lead role to Rohini and gives her a pay raise. Meanwhile, Subrahmaniam is suspended from the bank for not attending office for a long time. Due to certain misunderstandings, Rohini breaks up with him, hurting him deeply. Subru is also thrown out of the troupe by Chellappan Nair for not performing up to the mark.

Suresh Menon, upon knowing about Rohini and her claims of being his love interest, appears in front of her. Not knowing that he is the original Suresh Menon, she takes his help in solving the mess created at the ballet troupe. In the end, Suresh Menon solves the mess and gets Subru and Rohini together once again.

== Cast ==
- Maniyanpilla Raju as Siva Subrahmaniam
- Lissy as Rohini
- Nedumudi Venu as Keerikkad Chellappan Pillai (Keerikkadan Aashan)
- Shankar as Suresh Menon
- Jagathy Sreekumar as Sankaran Pillai
- Mukesh as Raghavan
- Sreenivasan as Bhaskaran
- Kuthiravattam Pappu as Kareem
- Innocent as Kurian
- Menaka
- Kamala Kamesh
- Poojappura Ravi as ASI Santhosh
- Paravoor Bharathan
- Manavalan Joseph
- Valsala Menon as Rohini's mother
- Bobby Kottarakkara
- Kothuku Nanappan

== Soundtrack ==
The music was composed by M. G. Radhakrishnan and Nedumudi Venu and the lyrics were written by Nedumudi Venu and S. Ramesan Nair.

No.	Song	Singers	Lyrics	Length (m:ss)
1	"Baale" (Introduction)	Nedumudi Venu	Nedumudi Venu	
2	"Kiliye Kiliye"	M. G. Sreekumar, Arundhathi	S. Ramesan Nair	
3	"Mandaarangalellaam"	K. J. Yesudas, Arundhathi	S. Ramesan Nair	
4	"Onnaanaam Kunnil"	M. G. Sreekumar, Pradeep	S. Ramesan Nair	
5	"Panchaali Vasthraakshepam" (Baale)	Nedumudi Venu	Nedumudi Venu	
6	"Vibheeshanan" (Baale)	Nedumudi Venu	Nedumudi Venu	
