= Thalavattam =

- Theatrical poster
- Directed by: Priyadarshan
- Screenplay by: Priyadarshan
- Based on: One Flew Over The Cuckoo's Nest by Ken Kesey
- Produced by: G. P. Vijayakumar
- Starring: Mohanlal; Karthika; Lizy
- Cinematography: S. Kumar
- Edited by: N. Gopalakrishnan
- Music by: Songs: Raghu Kumar; C. Rajamani; Score: Johnson
- Production company: Seven Arts Films
- Distributed by: Seven Arts Release
- Release date: 9 October 1986
- Running time: 147 minutes
- Country: India
- Language: Malayalam

Thalavattam (transl. Rhythm Cycle) is a 1986 Indian Malayalam-language drama film written and directed by Priyadarshan, starring Mohanlal, Lizy, M. G. Soman and Karthika. The film is very loosely based on the 1975 movie One Flew Over the Cuckoo's Nest which was an adaptation of the 1962 novel of the same name by Ken Kesey. The film features songs composed by Raghu Kumar and C. Rajamani, and a score by Johnson. The story follows Vinod, an eccentric new patient at a mental asylum.

The film was remade in Hindi as Kyon Ki (2005) by Priyadarshan and in Tamil as Manasukkul Mathappu (1988) by Robert–Rajasekar.

== Plot ==
Vinod becomes mentally ill after his girlfriend Anitha dies due to an electric short circuit accident during a rock concert. Vinod is admitted to a mental hospital managed by Dr. Ravindran, in Ooty. Dr Ravindran is aggressive and cruel man who has a strong hatred for Vinod. The hospital is more like a prison as the patients are treated inhumanely. With the help of Dr. Savithri, who is Dr. Ravindran's daughter, and Dr. Unnikrishnan, a very old and close acquaintance of Vinod from his childhood, he slowly regains his memory and mental equilibrium. Savithri and Vinod fall in love. Dr. Ravindran has already arranged Savithri's marriage with Hari and so he opposes the relationship along with holding Vinod hostage and treating him as if he hasn't recovered.

Dr Unnikrishnan begs Dr Ravindran to set Vinod free but he doesn't budge. This infuriates Dr Unnikrishnan and challenges Dr Ravindran that he will rescue Vinod no matter what. Dr Unnikrishnan reasons with Savithri and devises a plan to rescue Vinod later that night. Vinod having had enough of Dr Ravindran's cruelty, grabs and suffocates him, only to be dragged away by the hospital guards. That night, Dr. Ravindran lobotomises Vinod and puts him in a state of coma. Dr. Unnikrishnan discovers Vinod in a coma and is devastated. He feels that death would be preferable over a vegetative life and kills Vinod. He confronts Dr. Ravindran and confesses to the euthanasia. Savithri overhears the conversation, and loses her mental equilibrium. She is admitted into the same institution as a patient.

== Cast ==
- Mohanlal as Vinod Kumar ('Vinu'), the film protagonist and a mental patient
- Mukesh as Hari ('Chukkan')
- Nedumudi Venu as Dr. Unnikrishnan ('Unniettan'), a kind hearted elderly doctor
- M. G. Soman as Dr. Ravindran Varma, an aggressive and cruel man who has a hatred against Vinod
- Karthika as Savithri, Dr Ravindran’s kind hearted daughter
- Lissy as Anitha, Vinod’s deceased girlfriend
- Jagathi Sreekumar as Narayanan, a hospital guard
- Cochin Haneefa as Antony, an aggressive and cruel hospital guard
- Sukumari as Nurse Rachel
- G. P. Vijayakumar as Satheesh
- K. P. A. C. Sunny as Retd. Judge Melepattil Govindan Kumar
- KPAC Lalitha as Subhadra Kunjamma
- Thikkurissy Sukumaran Nair as 'Appoopan'
- Maniyanpilla Raju as Joseph
- Sankaradi as Thirumeni

== Soundtrack ==
All lyrics are written by Poovachal Khader except where noted; all music is composed by Reghu Kumar, Rajamani.

No.	Title	Lyrics	Artist(s)	Length
1.	"Kalabham Chaarthum"		M. G. Sreekumar
2.	"Konchum Nin Imbam"	Pandalam Sudhakaran	K. J. Yesudas, K. S. Chithra
3.	"Koottil Ninnum"		K. J. Yesudas
4.	"Pon Veene"		K. S. Chithra
5.	"Pon Veene"		K. S. Chithra, M. G. Sreekumar

== Reception ==
In 2002, comparing the film to One Flew over the Cuckoo's Nest, S. Santosh of The Hindu wrote, "Director Priyadarsan's syrupy Malayalam adaptation of the classic, Thalavattam, saw Mohanlal in his usual mainstream self. Had he seen the film, even Jack Nicholson would have been surprised: after all, the Hollywood actor has not mastered the art of running around trees."

Thalavattam was released in Kerala in 12 centres on 10 locations. The film performed well at the box office, becoming one the highest-grossing Malayalam films of the year. It was made on a shoestring budget of ₹20 lakh. The film ran over 100 days in theatres.

== Accolades ==
Kerala Film Critics Association Awards

- Best Male Playback Singer – K. J. Yesudas
- Best Female Playback Singer – K. S. Chithra

== Remakes ==
Thalavattam was remade in Hindi as Kyon Ki directed by Priyadarshan himself in 2005. The film was also remade in Tamil in 1988 by Robert–Rajasekar as Manasukkul Mathappu, with Prabhu and Saranya playing the lead also remade in Bengali Bangladesh in 2010 by F. I. Manik as Chirodin Ami Tomar, with Riaz, Purnima and Rumana.
