= Cheppu =

- Poster
- Directed by: Priyadarshan
- Screenplay by: V. R. Gopalakrishnan
- Based on: Class of 1984 by Mark Lester & Thomas Holland
- Produced by: Thiruppathi Chettiyar
- Starring: Mohanlal; Lizy; K. B. Ganesh Kumar; Roshni; Prathapachandran; Jagathy Sreekumar
- Cinematography: S. Kumar
- Edited by: Sankunni
- Music by: Songs: Reghu Kumar; Background score: K. J. Joy
- Distributed by: Evershine Release
- Release date: 8 June 1987
- Country: India
- Language: Malayalam

Cheppu is a 1987 Indian Malayalam-language action thriller film directed by Priyadarshan and starring Mohanlal. This film was a huge success. First time in Malayalam film Industry an English song used in the movie, "Free and Young" was sung by famous American singer Brenda Lee. The film is based on the 1982 Canadian film Class of 1984.

== Plot ==
Ramachandran gets a job as an English lecturer in T. K. P. Memorial College, only to find that many students are involved in drugs and politics, led by young Ranjith Mathews, son of Mathews, who is an MP. Ramachandran helps some students, including a geek named Anandan who was beaten by Ranjith's gang. The halls of the school are covered with graffiti. As Ramachandran gets to know the school and the area, Ranjith and his gang continue making trouble. One day when Ranjith and his gang are smoking drugs, they hear Ramachandran coming in. They leave the drugs and claim that they had done nothing wrong. Then one of their gang members, in the toxication of drugs climbs the flag pole and falls down and dies. Ram demands investigation on the matter as he knows he was on drugs due to Ranjith. But the police and college staff are corrupt. Then Ranjith and his gang beat up Anandan who is a friend of the dead student and who was also present at the scene. But Ramachandran saves him in the nick of time. As revenge, Ranjith and his gang kill Professor Varkey's animals in his lab, which makes him go mad. Ram and Ranjith wind up in a bathroom alone together. Ranjith throws himself into a mirror and beats himself, claiming that Ram attacked him. Trying to clear things up, Ram visits Ranjith's mother at home. Frustrated when Ranjith still plays the victim and his mother will not hear Ram out, he hotwires Ranjith's car and drives it into a wall.

Ramachandran continues fighting against Ranjith until he is murdered by his gang in the end. Ananthan later kills Ranjith for his honour.

== Cast ==
- Mohanlal as Prof. Ramachandran/ Choodan Ramachandran
- Ravi Menon
- Cochin Haneefa as Inspector Santhosh
- K. B. Ganesh Kumar as Ranjith
- Lizy as Nancy
- Roshni as Alice
- Prathapachandran as Mathews
- Sankaradi as Karunakaran Nair
- M. G. Soman as Sathyadas, Principal
- Sulakshana as Lakshmi
- Nedumudi Venu as Prof. Varkey
- Jagathy Sreekumar as Kannan, Canteen Owner

== Soundtrack ==
The music was composed by Raghu Kumar and the lyrics were written by Poovachal Khader.

No.	Song	Singers	Lyrics	Length (m:ss)
1	"Free And Young"	Brenda Lee	Priyadarshan	
2	"Maarivillin Chirakode"	K. J. Yesudas, Sujatha Mohan	Poovachal Khader	
