= Ayalvasi Oru Daridravasi =

1986 Malayalam film directed by Priyadarshan

- Poster
- Directed by: Priyadarshan
- Written by: Priyadarshan
- Produced by: G. Suresh Kumar; Sanal Kumar
- Starring: Prem Nazir; Mukesh; Shankar; Sukumari
- Cinematography: S. Kumar
- Edited by: N. Gopalakrishnan
- Music by: M. G. Radhakrishnan
- Production company: Sooryadaya Creations
- Distributed by: Murali Films
- Release date: 7 January 1986
- Running time: 160 minutes
- Country: India
- Language: Malayalam

Ayalvasi Oru Daridravasi (transl. Neighbour, a hobo) is a 1986 Indian Malayalam-language comedy film, directed by Priyadarshan starring an ensemble cast of Shankar, Menaka, Mukesh, Prem Nazir, Nedumudi Venu, Sukumari, Seema, and Innocent in the lead roles. Sreenivasan plays a brief cameo role in the film as a thief. The film had a few scenes adapted from the Hindi film Gol Maal.

== Plot ==
Two families share a strong bond and share things. Jayan, an unemployed youth comes to Adithya Varma, member of one of the families, also a doctor and says he it's inactive. But at evening, he sees Jayan cheering the girls at the stadium. But the youngster tells him that it is his twin brother who is flirty because of his situations and he does not have a moustache. Adithya assigns the twin brother (fake) to teach his daughter dance. Meanwhile, on the other part, Kuttan pillai does not like the bond of two families and tries to separate Adithya Varma and Sasidharan, the heads of two families, by crooked plans and confusion, such as by making them believe each one's spouse is having an affair with the other's. Adithya's daughter Kaveri and Sasidharan's younger brother Balu is in love. But because of enmity of the two families, their love does not succeed. They plan to elope and give Kuttan Pillai's son money to not reveal the plan to elope as he hears everything secretly. When Kaveri goes missing, Adithya suspects Jayan's twin. But Jayan reveals the truth that he have no twin brother. He knows that Balu is also missing. The families take the help of police to find the lovers. Kuttan pillai and his son accidentally tells a spark of their plan. The lovers do a register marriage and explains the plans of Kuttan pillai to the two families. Adithya Varma and Sasidharan give Kuttan Pillai's clothes to the policeman.

== Cast ==
- Shankar as Balu
- Prem Nazir as Adithya Varma
- Menaka as Kaveri
- Mukesh as Jayan
- Innocent as Kuttan Pillai
- Sukumari as Subhadra Kunjamma
- Nedumudi Venu as Sasidharan
- Seema as Parvathy
- Maniyanpilla Raju as Vidyadharan
- Lissy as Indira
- Kuthiravattam Pappu as Velu
- Ambalapuzha Raju as Vakeel
- Poojappura Ravi as Santhosh, police inspector
- Sreenivasan as thief (brief cameo role)
- Ramu

== Soundtrack ==
The music was composed by M. G. Radhakrishnan and the lyrics were written by Chunakkara Ramankutty.

No.	Song	Singers	Lyrics	Length (m:ss)
1	"Gulumalu"	M. G. Sreekumar, Chorus	Chunakkara Ramankutty	
2	"Swarangalaay"	K. S. Chithra, M. G. Sreekumar	Chunakkara Ramankutty	
