= Lissy (actress) =

Indian actress

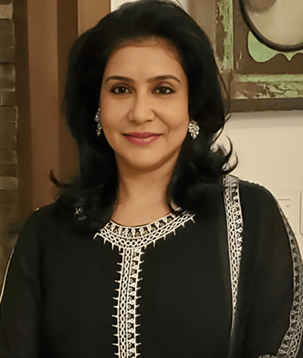
- Born: Kochi, Kerala, India
- Occupation: Actress
- Years active: 1982–1991; 2018–present
- Spouse: Priyadarshan (m. 1990; div. 2016)
- Partner(s): Priyadarshan (2026–present)
- Children: 2, including Kalyani

Lissy is an Indian actress, who has appeared primarily in Malayalam films, in addition to a few Telugu, Hindi, Tamil, and Kannada movies. She made her cinematic debut in 1982 with Ithiri Neram Othiri Karyam. Her notable roles include Odaruthammava Aalariyam (1984), Mutharamkunnu P.O. (1985), Boeing Boeing (1985), Thalavattom (1986), Vikram (1986) and Chithram (1988).

== Early life and education ==
Lissy was born in a Syro-Malabar Catholic family as the only child to Nellikaattil Pappachan (Varkey) and Aleyamma at Pukkattupadi, Kochi. Her parents divorced when she was very young, and she was brought up by her mother. She was educated at St. Teresa’s Convent Girls' School in Kochi and then at St. Teresa's College, Kochi.

Lissy was a bright student and scored excellent marks during her schooling. She started her career in movies at the age of 15 when she was studying for pre-university degree. She had to discontinue her studies to concentrate on her career. Later, she resumed her academic pursuits and, thereafter, earned a postgraduate degree in Psychology from Annamalai University through distance education.

== Career ==
Her debut into films happened in the early '80s. Along with Malayalam films, Lissy also had appeared in several Tamil, and Telugu films. Lissy is most remembered for her roles in Chithram, Thalavattom, Odaruthammava Alariyam, Mutharamkunnu P.O. and Boeing Boeing. As she stated in an interview with manam magazine, she was introduced to Tamil films by Kamal Haasan as his heroine in his home production, Vikram.

== Personal life ==
After having a relationship with the reputed movie director Priyadarshan, she was married to him on 13 December 1990. After marriage, she gave up acting and adopted the name Lakshmi for religious reasons. After the birth of their son Siddharth, she converted to Hinduism from Catholicism.

Lissy filed a divorce petition on 1 December 2014 in a family court at Chennai and was divorced on 1 September 2016, after 26 years of marriage.

In March 2026, Lissy reconciled with her former husband Priyadarshan, nearly a decade after their divorce in 2016. Priyadarshan stated that although they have not remarried, they are living together and have resumed their relationship.

== Filmography ==
=== Malayalam ===
List of Lissy Malayalam film credits
Year	Title	Role	Notes
1982	Ithiri Neram Othiri Karyam	Latha	
1983	Shesham Kazhchayil	Sudha	
1983	Asthram	Lilly	
1983	Prashnam Gurutharam	Girl Next Door	
1983	Aana	Annie	
1984	Parannu Parannu Parannu	Sudha	
1984	Athirathram	Cicily	
1984	Kaliyil Alpam Karyam	Kalpana	
1984	Odaruthammava Aalariyam	Minu	
1984	Aduthaduthu	Rema	
1985	Mutharamkunnu P.O.	K.P.Amminikutty	
1985	Punnaram Cholli Cholli	Rema	
1985	Thammil Thammil	Kavitha's friend	
1985	Onnanam Kunnil Oradikkunnil	Meenakshi	
1985	Thediya Valli Kaalilchutti		
1985	Onningu Vannengil	Priya	
1985	Ayanam	Lizy	
1985	Angadikkappurathu	Rathi	
1985	Aram + Aram = Kinnaram	Sujatha	
1985	Boeing Boeing	Elena	
1985	Nirakkoottu	Dr. Suma	
1985	Arante Mulla Kochu Mulla	Bindu	
1985	Aa Neram Alppa Dooram	Valsala	
1985	Puli Varunne Puli	Subhashini	
1985	Kathodu Kathoram	Theresa	
1985	Parayanumvayya Parayathirikkanumvayya	Sridevi	
1986	Dheem Tharikida Thom	Rohini	
1986	Pappan Priyappetta Pappan	Sarina	
1986	Ayalvasi Oru Daridravasi	Indira	
1986	Mazha Peyyunnu Maddalam Kottunnu	Shobha	
1986	Katturumbinum Kathukuthu	Prabha	
1986	Chekkeranoru Chilla	Chinnu	
1986	Iniyum Kurukshethram	Ammini	
1986	Vishwosichalum Illenkilum	-	
1986	Revathikkoru Pavakutty	Revathi Menon	
1986	Hello My Dear Wrong Number	Sunitha Menon	
1986	Mizhineerpoovukal	Sofia	
1986	Adukkan Enteluppam	-	
1986	Ice Cream	Rekha	
1986	Geetham	Herself	
1986	Thalavattam	Anitha	
1986	Rakkuyilin Raagassadasil	Revathi Menon	
1986	Aval Kathirunnu Avanum	-	
1986	Illenjippokkal	Malini	
1986	Ennu Nadhante Nimmi	Reena	
1986	Ashtabandham	Subaida	
1987	Kottum Kuravayum	Geetha	
1987	Oru Sindoora Pottinte Ormaykku	Bindu	
1987	Ivide Ellavarkum Sukham	Anitha Mathew]]	
1987	Neeyetra Dhanya	Laila	
1987	Adimakal Udamakal	Raji	
1987	Sarvakalasala	Jyothi	
1987	Itha Samayamayi		
1987	Cheppu	Mini	
1987	Manivathoorile Aayiram Sivarathrikal	Rani	
1987	Naalkavala	Nurse Mercy	
1988	Oru CBI Diary Kurippu	Omana	
1988	Oru Muthassi Kadha	Thresia	
1988	Manu Uncle	Uma	
1988	David David Mr. David	Liza	
1988	August 1	Petty Thief	
1988	Arjun Dennis		
1988	Oru Vivada Vishayam	Gigi	
1988	Aalilakuruvikal	Rajamma	
1988	Mrithyunjayam	Annie	
1988	Vellanakalude Nadu	Deepa	
1988	Chithram	Revathy	
1988	Unnikrishnante Adyathe Christmas	Sridevi	
1989	Njangalude Kochu Doctor	Alice	
1989	Charithram	Renu	
1989	Douthyam	Sarala	
1989	Aksharathettu	Elsy	
1989	Ammavanu Pattiya Amali	Sulochana	
1989	Adikkurippu	Veena	
1989	Aattinakkare	Soumya	
1989	Vadakkunokkiyantram	Sarala	
1989	The News	Jolly	
1989	Nair Saab	Parvathi	
1989	Rugmini	Meera	
1990	Minda Poochakku Kalyanam	Mini	
1990	Kuttettan	Revathi	
1991	May Dinam	Elizabeth	

=== Telugu ===
List of Lissy Telugu film credits
Year	Title	Role	Notes
1989	Sakshi	Swapna	
1990	Magaadu	Swetha	
1990	Doshi Nirdoshi	Anuradha	
1990	20va Sathabdam	Rani	
1990	Mamashri	Dheeraja	
1991	Aatma Bandham	Shailaja	
1991	Siva Sakthi	Kalyani	
1991	Stuvartpuram Dongalu	Vandana	
2018	Chal Mohan Ranga	Mrs. Subhramanyam	

=== Tamil ===
List of Lissy Tamil film credits
Year	Title	Role	Notes
1986	Vikram	Preethi	
1987	Ananda Aradhanai	Kavita	
1988	Manasukkul Mathappu	Anita	
1990	Pagalil Pournami	Jaya	

=== Kannada ===
List of Lissy Kannada film credits
Year	Title	Role	Notes
1990	Ashwamedha	Ganga	credited as Geethanjali

=== Hindi ===
List of Lissy Hindi film credits
Year	Title	Role	Notes
1985	Saagar	Rosy	
