= Chithram =

1988 Indian film by Priyadarshan

- Directed by: Priyadarshan
- Written by: Priyadarshan
- Produced by: P. K. R. Pillai
- Starring: Mohanlal; Ranjini; Lissy; Nedumudi Venu; Poornam Viswanathan; Sreenivasan
- Cinematography: S. Kumar
- Edited by: N. Gopalakrishnan
- Music by: Songs: Kannur Rajan; Background Score: Johnson
- Production company: Shirdi Sai Creations
- Distributed by: Shirdi Sai Release
- Release date: 23 December 1988 (Kerala)
- Running time: 160 minutes
- Country: India
- Language: Malayalam
- Budget: ₹44 Lakhs
- Box office: ₹3.5–4 crore (Note: Chithram's reported grosses vary between ₹3.5 crore (Mangalam) – ₹4 crore (Malayala Manorama))

Chithram (transl. Picture) is a 1988 Indian Malayalam-language screwball comedy film written and directed by Priyadarshan. The film was produced by P. K. R. Pillai under his production house Shirdi Sai Creations, and stars Mohanlal, Ranjini, Nedumudi Venu, Lizy, Poornam Viswanathan, Sreenivasan, M. G. Soman, Sukumari, Maniyanpilla Raju, and Shanavas, while Thikkurissy Sukumaran Nair makes a cameo appearance. The songs were composed by Kannur Rajan and film score by Johnson. Mohanlal won the Kerala State Film Award - Special Jury Award for his performance in this film as Vishnu.

Chithram was released during the Christmas weekend on 23 December 1988. Made on a budget of ₹4.4 million, the film grossed around ₹40 million at the box office, becoming the highest-grossing Malayalam film at the time.

== Plot ==
Kalyani is the daughter of a wealthy NRI Ramachandran Menon who resides in the United States. Kalyani, brought up in Madras by her father's friend Purushothaman Kaimal, falls in love with another man and decides to marry against the wishes of her father. When her boyfriend finds out that she will be disinherited, he ditches her at the altar. Her father writes a letter stating that he decides to approve her husband and wants to spend a fortnight's vacation with his daughter and son-in-law in his estate near a tribal community where Menon is the chief. As her father is already ill and because this may be his last vacation, Kalyani and Kaimal want to make it as happy for him as possible. They decide to hide the fact that her boyfriend dumped her.

Kaimal then sees Vishnu who played a trick on a foreigner by telling a lie to him that his brother cannot swim. When the foreigner jumps into the river, Vishnu runs off with his clothes. The foreigner questions and asks Kaimal about his clothes, and Kaimal gets slapped. Kaimal then goes to Vishnu and confronts him for stealing the clothes. Vishnu states his urgent need for money, and Kaimal hires Vishnu to play the part of the husband for 14 days. Meanwhile, Kalyani's cousin Bhaskaran Nambiar, who is the caretaker of the estate, was expected to inherit Menon's estate and property when Kalyani was disinherited, is determined not to let go without a fight. He knows that Vishnu is not Kalyani's husband and makes various botched attempts to prove this.

Initially, Vishnu and Kalyani do not get along and keep bickering. But as time passes, Kalyani sees Vishnu's heart as he tied the mangalasutra around her neck, just in time before her father came (Bhaskaran informed him that she didn't have the mangalasutra around her neck). Kalyani eventually develops an affection towards Vishnu and hopes to marry him for real. A couple of days later, they have a mysterious visitor who claims to be a relative of Vishnu.

Finally, it is revealed that Vishnu is actually an escaped convict from jail who is sentenced to death and the visitor turns out to be the prison warden. Vishnu's past is shown in flashback and he was a freelance photographer who was married to a woman named Revathy, a mute dancer. They also had a child. Vishnu discovers that a man was visiting his wife when he was not around and begins to suspect her. Coming home one day he finds the man there and tries to attack him. Revathy dies in the scuffle, and Vishnu discovers that the man is actually her brother who is a naxalite. He tells Kalyani that he escaped prison to make money for the surgery of his child.

On the last night of Vishnu's stay at the house, he asks Jail Warden, is it possible for him to live, as he started to like life again. The warden does not reply to this question, as he is helpless regarding this. After a happy fortnight, Kalyani's father returns to the US. The final scene shows the warden taking Vishnu to jail, where his execution awaits him, with Kalyani watching him leave. This film ends with Vishnu and Kalyani waving goodbye.

== Cast ==
- Mohanlal as Vishnu
- Ranjini as Kalyani, Vishnu's Love Interest
- Nedumudi Venu as Adv. Purushothama Kaimal, Kalyani's Uncle
- Poornam Viswanathan as Ramachandra Menon, Kalyani's Father (voice by Narendra Prasad)
- Sreenivasan as Bhaskaran Nambiar, Kalyani's Cousin
- M. G. Soman as Jail Superintendent
- Lissy as Revathy, Vishnu's Deceased Wife
- Jagadish as Vishnu's Friend
- Maniyanpilla Raju as Murugan, Nambiar's Helper
- Sukumari as Subhadra, Ramachandra Menon's Sister and Bhaskaran Nambiar's Mother
- Unni Mary as Bhaskaran Nambiar's Sister
- Shanavas as Raveendran (Ravi), Kalyani's Ex-Lover
- Chandraji as Kattumooppan
- Soorya as Mooppan's Daughter
- Bobby Kottarakkara as Krishnankutty Nair, Marriage Broker
- Thikkurissy Sukumaran Nair as Varma, Revathy's Father (Cameo)
- K. B. Ganesh Kumar as Revathy's Brother (Cameo)
- Innocent as Money Lender (Cameo)

== Soundtrack ==
Chithram

Soundtrack album by Kannur Rajan
- Released: 1987
- Recorded: 1987
- Genre: Film soundtrack
- Labels: Ranjini Cassettes; Satyam Audios
- Producer: P. K. R. Pillai

Kannur Rajan chronology
Onninu Purake Mattonnu (1988)	Chithram (1987)	Aayiram Chirakulla Moham (1989)

The film's songs were composed by Kannur Rajan and lyrics penned by Shibu Chakravarthy. M. G. Sreekumar sang most of the songs in the film. Carnatic music singer Neyyattinkara Vasudevan was a guest singer. The classical Krithis like "Nagumomu" and "Swaminatha" featured in the film gained a mass popularity. Playback singer Sujatha Mohan also sang in the film, marking her return after years of sabbatical. Mohanlal sang two songs "Kaadumi Naadumellam" and "Aey Monnu". The songs were released by the label Ranjini Cassettes. Chithram was the last Malayalam film to release the song tracks in LP Record until 2022.

No.	Title	Singer(s)	Notes
1	"Eeran Megham"	M. G. Sreekumar	Raga: Madhyamavati
2	"Paadam Pootha Kaalam"	M. G. Sreekumar	
3	"Nagumomu"	Neyyattinkara Vasudevan, M. G. Sreekumar	Traditional keerthanam by Tyagaraja; Raga: Abheri
4	"Doore Kizhakkudhikkin"	M. G. Sreekumar, Sujatha	
5	"Aey Moonnu"	Mohanlal	Traditional folk music
6	"Paadam Koyyum Munpe"	Sujatha	
7	"Paadam Pootha Kaalam (Pathos)"	M. G. Sreekumar	
8	"Swaminatha"	M. G. Sreekumar	Traditional Keerthanam by Muthuswami Dikshitar; Raga: Nattai
9	"Kaadumi Naadumellam"	Mohanlal, Sujatha, Chorus	

== Reception ==
Chithram was released during a Christmas weekend on 23 December 1988. Upon release, it broke all existing records in Malayalam cinema until then. Released in 21 A class theatres, Chithram ran for 50 days in 16 release theatres, 100 days in 6 theatres, 150 days in 5 theatres, 200 days in 4 theatres, 225 days in 3 theatres and 300 days in 2 theatres. It had a theatrical run of more than 400 days in Little Shenoys (Ernakulam). It completed 366 days run with regular shows in two theatres—Little Shenoys (Ernakulam) and Ajanta (Trivandrum), and 200 days in four theatres—Little Shenoys (Ernakulam), Ajantha (Trivandrum), Asha (Kottayam), and Priya (Palakkad). Made on a budget of ₹0.44 crore, the film grossed around ₹4 crore at the box office, becoming the highest-grossing Malayalam film of its time. The film was a success in Tamil Nadu also.

== Accolades ==
Kerala Film Critics Association Awards

- Best Actor – Mohanlal
- Best Female Playback Singer – Sujatha Mohan

== Remakes ==
The film was remade in Telugu as Alludugaru (1990), in Hindi as Pyar Hua Chori Chori (1991), in Kannada as Rayaru Bandaru Mavana Manege (1993), and in Tamil as Engirundho Vandhan (1995).
