= Punnaram Cholli Cholli =

- Directed by: Priyadarshan
- Screenplay by: Sreenivasan
- Story by: Priyadarshan
- Starring: Rahman; Shankar; Zarina Wahab; Sreenivasan; Innocent; Bharat Gopy; Nedumudi Venu; Lizy
- Cinematography: S. Kumar
- Edited by: N. Gopalakrishnan
- Music by: Jerry Amaldev; Johnson (score)
- Production company: Swayamvara Productions
- Distributed by: Dinny Films
- Release date: 11 January 1985
- Country: India
- Language: Malayalam

Punnaram Cholli Cholli is a 1985 Indian Malayalam-language romantic drama film directed by Priyadarshan and written by Sreenivasan from a story by Priyadarshan. Starring Shankar and Rahman. The film was a commercial success at the box office.

== Plot ==
Biju is a motherless boy from a rich family. He studies in Ooty in a boarding school and spends his vacations in his father's ancestral village. His father, a busy lawyer has no time for him or his vast property. The property is looked after by Krishnankutty Nair and his assistant, Shivaraman. The duo live off the property selling the produce on the sly because Biju is too innocent to notice anything.

Vinodini, the niece of the local baker Peethambharan reaches the village to join for duty at the local bank. Biju saves her from reaching her uncle's house via a long route suggested by Shivaraman and Krishnankutty Nair. Vinodini considers Biju her younger brother and the lonely Biju becomes good friends with her.

The conniving duo, Shivaraman and Krishnankutty Nair, mislead Biju into believing that Vinodini is in love with him and desires him as her husband. They want the boy out of their way so that they can pilfer from the farm without having to look out for him. The innocent boy falls for their story. This leads to misunderstandings, disappointment, jealousy and the duo further goad him to take revenge for a perceived rejection which leads to a terrible tragedy.

== Cast ==
- Rahman as Biju
- Zarina Wahab as Vinodini
- Shankar as Aravind
- Sreenivasan as Rameshan
- Innocent as Peethambharan
- Bharath Gopi as Krishnankutty Nair
- Nedumudi Venu as Shivaraman
- Lissy
- C. I. Paul
- Sukumari

== Songs ==
The movie had four songs composed by Jerry Amaldev and written by O. N. V. Kurup

1. "Arayarayo Kinginiyo" - K. S. Chithra
2. "Atha Poovum Nulli" - K. J. Yesudas, K. S. Chithra
3. "Neerkili Neenthi Vaa" - K. S. Chithra
4. "Vaa Kuruvi Inakkuruvi" - M. G. Sreekumar, K. S. Chithra

== Reception ==
Punnaram Cholli Cholli was distributed by Dinny Films and was a commercial success at the box office.
