= Rakkuyilin Ragasadassil =

- Promotional Poster designed by Gayathri Ashokan
- Directed by: Priyadarshan
- Written by: T.P.Kishore
- Produced by: G. Suresh Kumar; Sanal Kumar
- Starring: Mammootty; Suhasini; Adoor Bhasi; Jagathi Sreekumar; Lizy
- Cinematography: S. Kumar
- Edited by: N. Gopalakrishnan
- Music by: M. G. Radhakrishnan
- Production company: Sooryodaya Creations
- Distributed by: Saj Movies
- Release date: 14 November 1986
- Country: India
- Language: Malayalam

Rakkuyilin Ragasadassil is a 1986 Malayalam-language Indian family drama film written and directed by Priyadarshan, starring Mammootty, Suhasini, Adoor Bhasi, Jagathi Sreekumar and Lissy in lead roles.

== Plot ==
The film starts with the comeback of Mr. Viswanathan, a well-known musician of past. He was in love with his college mate and a dancer Janani. Due to this, the couple faced several problems from her own father and the college principal Ragan Vaidyanathan. But finally they managed to get married. Soon after their marriage, their ego and professional jealousy starts causing problems in their life. After a very short married life, Viswanathan leaves the house with their son. During his comeback, their son meets Janani. Janani was trying to achieve the Natyasree award in dance. Viswanathan comes back to prevent this achievement. He challenges Janani to dance to his voice. On the day of competition, Viswanathan realizes the situation and withdraws from the competition. He entrusts his son to sing instead of him. After the award, the couple rejoins.

== Cast ==
- Mammootty as Viswanathan
- Suhasini as Janani, Viswanathan's love interest turned wife
- Adoor Bhasi as Ragan Vaidyanathan
- Jagathy Sreekumar as Kannan
- Lissy as Nithya
- K. B. Ganesh Kumar as Anil
- Cochin Haneefa as Hari
- Sukumari as Latha
- Sankaradi as Chandu
- Anu Anand as Sathish

== Soundtrack ==
The music was composed by M. G. Radhakrishnan and the lyrics were written by S. Ramesan Nair.

No.	Song	Singers	Lyrics	Length (m:ss)
1	"Ethra Pookkaalam" (M)	K. J. Yesudas	S. Ramesan Nair	
2	"Ethra Pookkaalam" (F Dominant)	Arundhathi, K. J. Yesudas	S. Ramesan Nair	
3	"Gopaalaka Paahimam"	K. J. Yesudas		
4	"Gopaalaka Paahimam" (D)	K. J. Yesudas, Arundhathi		
5	"Poomukha Vathilkkal"	K. J. Yesudas	S. Ramesan Nair	
6	"Sree Ganapathini"	M. G. Sreekumar, Chorus		
7	"Swararaagame"	M. G. Sreekumar	S. Ramesan Nair	
8	"Vallithirumanam"	M. G. Sreekumar, Arundhathi, Chorus	S. Ramesan Nair	
