= Odaruthammava Aalariyam =

- Directed by: Priyadarshan
- Screenplay by: Sreenivasan
- Story by: Priyadarshan
- Produced by: G. Suresh Kumar; Sanal Kumar
- Starring: Nedumudi Venu; Sreenivasan; Mukesh; Jagadish; Shankar; Lizy; Sreenath; Menaka
- Cinematography: S. Kumar
- Edited by: N. Gopalakrishnan
- Music by: M. G. Radhakrishnan
- Distributed by: Dinny Films
- Release date: 7 May 1984
- Running time: 175 minutes
- Country: India
- Language: Malayalam

Odaruthammava Aalariyam (transl. Don't run, uncle, we know you) is a 1984 Indian Malayalam-language screwball comedy film directed by Priyadarshan and written by Sreenivasan from a story by Priyadarshan. It is about a middle aged family man who is a womanizer and about three college students and their efforts to woo the womanizer's daughter. Nedumudi Venu, Sreenivasan, Mukesh, Jagadish, and Shankar play the lead roles. Odaruthammava Aalariyam was a commercial success at the box office.

== Plot ==
Gopan, Kora and Bhakthavalsalan are three college students who share the same house, along with Preman, another classmate. While the trio is more interested in spending their time by flirting with girls, Preman is more serious in his attitude towards life. On a usual encounter, the trio meets Major Nair, a retired man in his fifties, who loves romancing young girls.

After a series of ego clashes, Nair learns that the trio is trying to woo his daughter Minu. Nair, enraged, challenges them to make his daughter fall for them. Accepting the challenge, the trio start to make her fell for them. Minu, who seriously shows concern towards disabled people, falls in love with Preman, whom she thinks to be disabled. Meanwhile, Nair bets with Govind, another street romeo, who is married to a beautiful innocent girl. Govind says that would shave his head if Minu falls in love with anyone within 3 months.Nair agrees that he would shave his mustache to half if he loses the bet.

Minu learns that Preman is not disabled, but she still goes on with the relationship. Gopan enters Nair's home as a servant and enjoys easy access to Minu's room. Kora arrives at Nair's house as a disciple of his brother-in-law, a wrestler. Bhakthavalsalan claims himself to be a Hindi scholar Bhaktha Khanna, and says he is the nephew of popular Bollywood actor Rajesh Khanna and gets appointed as Minu's Hindi tuition master. Govind, in the meantime, arrives in front of Minu as a blind man, for whom she feels sympathetic and brings home. Major Nair is shocked to find all four at his home, but is unable to open up the secrets as he fears blackmailing with a photograph taken by them while Nair was attending a cabaret show.

Eventually, Nair succeeds in chasing everyone out of his house. The trio is shocked to find Minu is in love with Preman and now put all their energy to break them apart. Upon learning that their love is sincere, the trio along with Govind helps Preman to marry Minu. The film ends with Preman marrying Minu and Major Nair losing his bet and having his mustache half-shaved.

== Cast ==
- Nedumudi Venu as Major Nair
- Sreenivasan as Bhakthavalsalan
- Mukesh as Gopan
- Jagadish as Kora
- Shankar as Preman
- Sreenath as Govindan
- Poojappura Ravi as Phylvan Vasu Pillai, Nair's brother in law
- Kuthiravattom Pappu as Pachan Pillai
- Lissy as Minu
- Sukumari as Saraswathi, Major Nair's Wife
- Thikkurissy Sukumaran Nair as Sukumaran Nair
- Menaka as Govindan's Wife
- Thodupuzha Vasanthi
- Noohu

== Production ==
The film was extensively shot at Jawahar Nagar in Thiruvananthapuram.

== Soundtrack ==
The music was composed by M. G. Radhakrishnan with lyrics by Chunakkara Ramankutty.

No.	Song	Singers	Lyrics	Length (m:ss)
1	"Maanathe Maanikyakkunninmel"	M. G. Sreekumar, G. Venugopal, Ambili, Chorus, D. Sivaprasad, Janakidevi, K. G. Markose	Chunakkara Ramankutty	
2	"Odaruthammaava Aalariyaam"	M. G. Sreekumar, K. G. Markose	Chunakkara Ramankutty	
3	"Poopol Mohangal"	M. G. Sreekumar, Janakidevi	Chunakkara Ramankutty	

== Reception ==
Odaruthammava Aalariyam was distributed by Dinny Films was a commercial success at the box office. A critic from The Times of India wrote that "Filled with hilarious moments, songs, and outstanding performances, ‘Odaruthammava Aalariyam’ is sure to make your Friday evening colourful".
