= Parayanumvayya Parayathirikkanumvayya =

- Poster
- Directed by: Priyadarshan
- Written by: Cochin Haneefa
- Based on: Faraar by Shaker Mukherjee, Gulzar
- Produced by: Anand
- Starring: Mammootty; Shankar; Menaka; Mohanlal
- Cinematography: S. Kumar
- Edited by: N. Gopalakrishnan
- Music by: M. G. Radhakrishnan
- Production company: Anand Movie Arts
- Distributed by: Gandhimathi Release
- Release date: 21 November 1985
- Running time: 135 minutes
- Country: India
- Language: Malayalam

Parayanumvayya Parayathirikkanumvayya (transl. Can't say and can't say not to) is a 1985 Indian Malayalam-language crime drama film directed by Priyadarshan and written by Cochin Haneefa. It is a remake of the 1975 Hindi-language film Faraar. The movie starred Mammootty, Menaka and Shankar in lead roles along with Mohanlal in supporting role. The film was received mixed to negative reviews and average hit .

== Plot ==
Ravi, a convict, escapes from prison to take revenge on the man who ruined his life. He disguises himself and takes shelter at a police officer's house.

== Cast ==
- Mammootty as D.S.P Sreekumar
- Shankar as Ravi (T. G. Raveendran)
- Menaka as Shalini
- Mohanlal as Hamsa
- Sumithra as Sathi
- Sreenath as Rajan
- Sukumari
- Lizy as Sreedevi
- Cochin Haneefa as Prasad
- Kuthiravattam Pappu as Ramettan
- KPAC Sunny as Raveendran Nair
- Baby Smitha

== Soundtrack ==
The music was composed by M. G. Radhakrishnan with lyrics by Chunakkara Ramankutty.

No.	Song	Singers	Lyrics	Length (m:ss)
1	"Angekkunningekkunnu"	G. Venugopal, M. G. Sreekumar, Radhika Thilak	Chunakkara Ramankutty	
2	"Kannil Virinju Moham"	K. S. Chithra, M. G. Sreekumar	Chunakkara Ramankutty	
3	"Kuliru Kuliru"	P. Susheeladevi	Chunakkara Ramankutty	
4	"Swarangalaay"	M. G. Sreekumar	Chunakkara Ramankutty	
