= Garam Masala (2005 film) =

2005 Indian film by Priyadarshan

- Theatrical release poster
- Directed by: Priyadarshan
- Written by: Priyadarshan
- Dialogues by: Neeraj Vora
- Based on: Boeing Boeing by Priyadarshan
- Produced by: Ganesh Jain; Ratan Jain
- Starring: Akshay Kumar; John Abraham; Paresh Rawal; Rimi Sen; Neha Dhupia; Daisy Bopanna; Neetu Chandra; Nargis Bagheri; Rajpal Yadav; Manoj Joshi; Asrani
- Cinematography: Tirru
- Edited by: N. Gopalakrishnan; Arun Kumar
- Music by: Songs: Pritam; Score: D. Imman
- Production company: Venus Movies
- Release date: 3 November 2005
- Running time: 142 minutes
- Country: India
- Language: Hindi
- Budget: ₹17 crore
- Box office: ₹54.65 crore

Garam Masala is a 2005 Indian Hindi-language comedy film written and directed by Priyadarshan. The film stars Akshay Kumar, John Abraham, Paresh Rawal, Rimi Sen, Neha Dhupia and Rajpal Yadav. The story revolves around Makarand "Mac" Deendayal Chatpatiya (Kumar) and Shyam "Sam" Salgaonkar (Abraham), two photographer friends, who like to flirt with women constantly. After a trip abroad, Shyam decides to disrupt Makarand's life when he sees him enjoying the company of three ladies. The film is a remake of Priyadarshan's own 1985 Malayalam comedy Boeing Boeing which was a remake of 1965 English movie of the same name which in turn was based on the 1960 French play of the same name. A famous hotel comedy sequence from this movie was based on Priyadarshan's another 1985 Malayalam movie Aram + Aram = Kinnaram.

Garam Masala was released during Diwali in 2005 and received mixed reviews from the critics and was a commercial success. However, Kumar was appreciated for his performance which also won him the Best Actor in a Comic Role award at the Filmfare Awards. In 2024, Akshay Kumar called this movie "the toughest film of his career". Over the years, the film has attained a cult status, often celebrated for quotable lines in meme culture and rewatch value. Almost all of the scenes of Garam Masala were inspired from the 1965 American film Boeing Boeing.

== Plot ==
The film starts off when two photographers, Makarand "Mac" Deendayal Chatpatiya and Shyam "Sam" Salgaonkar, are doing a photo shoot. While Mac is shooting the models in exposing poses, his fiancée Anjali leaves in disgust due to Mac's closeness to the models. Their boss calls them into his office and tells them that they are good-for-nothing photographers. He threatens to reduce their pay if they don't get some good pictures for the world photography competition to make his magazine Garam Masala famous.

Both Mac and Sam ask Maggie, the boss's secretary, on a date on the same day, at the same restaurant at the same time. As all three meet up at the restaurant, a pickpocket takes Mac's and Sam's wallets. After the meal, the competition to impress Maggie heightens, thus evoking humorous events, after which Sam and Mac leave Maggie to pay the bill.

Sam visits a famous photographer, praising him and asking for a few outstanding shots. These stolen shots help Sam win the world photography competition. He gets promoted, is given ten percent of the prize money, and has his pay doubled, while Mac receives a demotion to assistant. Sam flies off to the US to enjoy his holiday, leaving Mac fuming in Mauritius.

The editor suggests that Mac outdo Sam by obtaining three fiancées, an apartment, and imported cars. Mac secures an apartment and arranges for three hostesses to act as his fiancées. His driver, Babban, provides access to the apartment and supplies cars to show the hostesses. Babban drives the cars and performs tasks in exchange for daily liquor. Babban also hires a housekeeper, Mambo, who attends to the apartment under specific conditions.

He has affairs with each of the three women — Deepti, Puja, and Sweety — and creates chaos. Sam returns from America, only to find his friend turned rival, playing around with three women at once. He tries to help his friend and tries out his own luck with the girls.

The story turns into mayhem when it's hard for the two boys to maintain the three girls simultaneously. Mac's original fiancée Anjali learns about Mac's acts, and it creates a bigger mess. When their cook Mambo leaves, they begin to realise their mistakes, and Mac attempts reuniting with Anjali. In the end, Mac tries to climb on the car which Anjali and Sam are in while being chased by the three air hostesses he was dating along with a battalion of others, now that they realised the truth.

== Cast ==
- Akshay Kumar as Makrand "Mac" Godbhole
- John Abraham as Shyam "Sam" Salgaonkar
- Paresh Rawal as Mambo Rana
- Rimi Sen as Anjali Bhatnagar, Mac's real fiancée and to-be wife
- Neha Dhupia as Maggie Chaudhary
- Daisy Bopanna as Deepti Sinha, an airhostess, Mac's fake fiancée
- Neetu Chandra as Sweety Nair, an airhostess, Mac's fake fiancée
- Nargis Bagheri as Puja Dhawan, an airhostess, Mac's fake fiancée
- Rajpal Yadav as Babban Sharma
- Manoj Joshi as Nageshwar Kapoor
- Asrani as Mamu Singh, Mac's maternal uncle
- Viju Khote as Chote Lal Yadav, Mac & Sam's Boss
- Prithvi Zutshi as Landlord Daksh Padgaonkar

== Soundtrack ==
Garam Masala

Soundtrack album by Pritam Chakraborty
- Released: 15 September 2005
- Genre: Feature Film soundtrack
- Length: 40:06
- Label: Venus Records & Tapes
- Producer: Pritam Chakraborty

Pritam Chakraborty chronology
Chocolate (2005)	Garam Masala (2005)	Ek Khiladi Ek Haseena (2005)

The music is composed by Pritam while the lyrics were written by Sameer and Mayur Puri. All the remixes were mixed by DJ Suketu. D. Imman composed by the background score.

=== Track listing ===
All music is composed by Pritam.

No.	Title	Lyrics	Singer(s)	Length
1.	"Ada (Quote From Amr Diab)"	Sameer	Sonu Nigam	4:45
2.	"Chori Chori"	Sameer	Sukhwinder Singh, Hema Sardesai	4:35
3.	"Kiss Me Baby"	Sameer	Adnan Sami	3:39
4.	"Falak Dekhun (Quote From Amr Diab)"	Mayur Puri	Sonu Nigam	5:10
5.	"Dil Samandar"	Sameer	KK, Sunidhi Chauhan	5:14
6.	"Chori Chori" (II)	Sameer	Labh Janjua	4:07
7.	"Falak Dekhun (Quote From Amr Diab)" (II)	Mayur Puri	Udit Narayan	5:10
8.	"Ada" (Remix (Quote From Amr Diab))	Sameer	Sonu Nigam	3:46
9.	"Kiss Me Baby" (Remix by DJ Akbar Sami)	Sameer	Adnan Sami	3:40

== Release ==
The film was theatrically released on 2 November 2005 coinciding with Diwali.

== Reception ==
=== Box office ===
Made on a budget of ₹170 million, the film grossed ₹546.5 million in its theatrical run.

=== Critical response ===
Raja Sen of Rediff.com called the film ″funniest film of the year″, writing ″Akshay Kumar rocks the film. In a commandingly restrained performance, the actor shows off topnotch comic timing to hilarious effect. Balancing subtle shifts of tone with wildly over-the-top slapstick, he manages to always get a laugh, even when the script falters. There's a self-deprecating aspect visible in Akshay's comedy that adds warmth to the film. And he counters his goofy grin with a terrific display of deadpan dialogue delivery. This is his film, and he's having a ball.″

Conversely, Namrata Joshi of Outlook Magazine gave the film 2 stars out of 5, writing ″Priyadarshan again shows a spirit for mirth and mania but the film is not quite a laugh riot.″ Kaveree Bamzai of India Today wrote ″The lines are suited to the revolving-door kind of sex comedy. So there are many jibes about thighs, eyes and undies, which are ridiculous enough to elicit laughter from the devotees of films like No Entry.″

== Accolades ==
=== Won ===
- Filmfare Awards for Best Comedian – Akshay Kumar
