= Priyadarshan =

Indian filmmaker (born 1957)

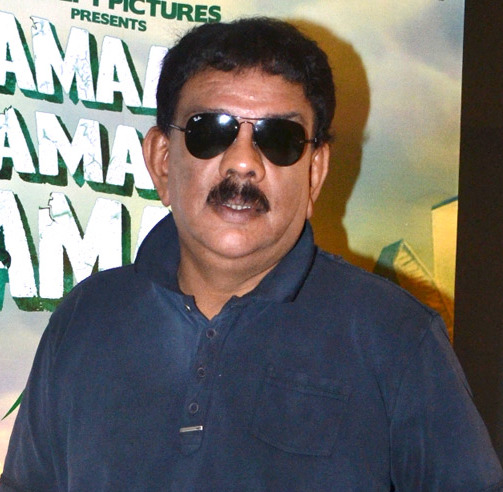
- Priyadarshan at a press conference for Kamaal Dhamaal Malamaal
- Born: Priyadarshan Soman Nair; 30 January 1957 (age 69); Thiruvananthapuram, Kerala, India
- Occupations: Film director; screenwriter
- Years active: 1982–present
- Works: Full list
- Spouse: Lissy (m. 1990; div. 2016)
- Partner(s): Lissy (2026–present)
- Children: 2; including Kalyani

Priyadarshan Soman Nair (born 30 January 1957) is an Indian film director and screenwriter. He has worked primarily in Malayalam and Hindi cinema since 1982, directing over 90 films in multiple Indian languages, with notable works in Tamil and Telugu. Known for variety of genre films, he has received several accolades, including three National Film Awards, multiple Kerala State Film Awards, and the Padma Shri in 2012.

He began his cinematic journey in the early 1980s, primarily working in Malayalam cinema. He directed several notable films during this period, including Mazha Peyyunnu Maddalam Kottunnu (1986), Thalavattam (1986), Vellanakalude Nadu (1988), Chithram (1988), Vandanam (1989), and Kilukkam (1991). Throughout the 1990s, he continued directing successful films such as Abhimanyu (1991), Mithunam (1993), Thenmavin Kombath (1994), Kaalapaani (1996), Chandralekha (1997), and Megham (1999).

While working in Malayalam cinema, Priyadarshan also made his foray into Bollywood with the action thrillers Gardish (1994) and Virasat (1997). In the 2000s, he gained widespread recognition in Bollywood for his Hindi adaptations of Malayalam films, particularly in the comedy genre. Some of his most notable Bollywood films include Hera Pheri (2000), Hungama (2003), Hulchul (2004), Garam Masala (2005), Bhagam Bhag, Chup Chup Ke (both 2006), Dhol, Bhool Bhulaiyaa (both 2007), De Dana Dan (2009), Khatta Meetha (2010), and Bhooth Bangla (2026).

== Early life ==
Priyadarshan received his early education at the Government Model School in Thiruvananthapuram, and later a Master of Arts in Philosophy from University College Thiruvananthapuram. His father, a college librarian, nurtured his love for literature, which led to a passion for storytelling. He was an avid reader in his teens, and during college, he began writing short plays and skits for All India Radio. He was influenced by the films of director P. Venu. His friends during this time included Mohanlal, M. G. Sreekumar, Suresh Kumar, Sanal Kumar, Jagadish, Maniyanpilla Raju, and Ashok Kumar. Mohanlal entered the film industry, and his friends followed him to Chennai in search of opportunities. With Mohanlal's help, Priyadarshan worked as an assistant scriptwriter on a few films and began writing his own scripts, some of which became successful. Eventually, he returned to Kerala.

Though he initially aspired to become a cricketer, an eye injury shifted his focus toward filmmaking.

== Film career ==
Priyadarshan has been active in Indian cinema since 1984 as a director and screenwriter, directing over 95 films across Malayalam, Tamil, Hindi, and Telugu.

=== 1984–1987 ===
In 1984, Priyadarshan made his directorial debut with Poochakkoru Mookkuthi, a slapstick comedy produced by his friends Suresh Kumar and Sanal Kumar, with financial backing from Thiruvenkadam. Mohanlal, who had become a well-known actor by then, starred alongside Shankar as the parallel lead. The film received critical acclaim and became a commercial success, running for 100 days in Kerala theaters.

Following this success, Priyadarshan continued making comedies, directing Odaruthammava Aalariyam and Onnanam Kunnil Oradi Kunnil. He then experimented with a family thriller, Parayanumvayya Parayathirikkanumvayya, starring Mammootty and Shankar. His first film without Mohanlal, Punnaram Cholli Cholli, was followed by Boeing Boeing and Aram + Aram = Kinnaram, both of which were well received.

However, Rakkuyilin Ragasadassil, despite featuring hit songs, failed at the box office. He regained success with Mazha Peyyunnu Maddalam Kottunnu, Ayalvasi Oru Daridravasi, and Dheem Tharikida Thom. The family drama Thalavattam established him as a director capable of handling serious themes, further strengthening his position in the Malayalam film industry.

During this period, Priyadarshan also directed a Tamil film, Chinnamanikkuyile, which remained unreleased. Meanwhile, his Malayalam film Cheppu achieved commercial success.

He then made Punnaram Cholli Cholli, his first film without Mohanlal, followed by Boeing Boeing and Aram + Aram = Kinnaram. He was later criticised for Rakkuyilin Ragasadassil. Despite hit songs, the film flopped. However, Mazha Peyyunnu Maddalam Kottunnu, Ayalvasi Oru Daridravasi and Dheem Tharikida Thom were successful. Priyadarshan gained recognition as a serious director with the successful family drama Thalavattam. His Tamil film Chinnamanikkuyile remained unreleased, while his work in Malayalam continued with Cheppu, which was a success.

=== 1988–1998 ===
In 1988, Priyadarshan directed multiple films that contributed to his growing recognition in Indian cinema. Vellanakalude Nadu, scripted by Sreenivasan and starring Mohanlal, tackled themes of corruption and land mafia, becoming a significant film in his career. He then directed Aryan, an action film written by T. Damodaran, which depicted the Mumbai underworld and achieved commercial success, running for over 150 days in theaters.

That same year, Chithram, a comedy-drama starring Mohanlal, was released. The film ran for 366 days in theaters, setting box office records at the time, later surpassed by his own film Kilukkam in 1991. Priyadarshan's other releases in 1988 included Oru Muthassi Katha and Mukunthetta Sumitra Vilikkunnu. However, he faced setbacks in 1990 with Kadathanadan Ambadi and Akkare Akkare Akkare, which did not perform well commercially.

In 1991, Kilukkam, starring Mohanlal, Jagathi Sreekumar, and Revathi, became a box office success, further cementing Priyadarshan's reputation. His subsequent films, Abhimanyu (1991), Advaitham (1992), and Thenmavin Kombathu (1994), all ran for over 100 days in theaters. Midhunam (1993) and Minnaram (1994) also received positive responses from audiences.

Priyadarshan expanded into Tamil cinema when he was invited by M. Karunanidhi to direct Gopura Vasalile for his son's production house. In 1991, he directed his first Telugu film, Nirnayam, when actor Nagarjuna approached him to remake the Malayalam film Vandanam. He made his Bollywood debut in 1992 with Muskurahat, a remake of Kilukkam, though it failed at the box office.

In 1993, Priyadarshan returned to Bollywood with Gardish, an adaptation of the Malayalam film Kireedom, written by A. K. Lohithadas. In 1994, he directed his second and, to date, last Telugu film, Gandeevam, starring Balakrishna. He gained national recognition in 1996 when he directed the Miss World pageant held in Bangalore. That same year, he released Kalapani, a period drama about India's independence struggle, scripted by T. Damodaran. The film, starring Mohanlal, Tabu, Prabhu, and Amrish Puri, was originally made in Malayalam and later dubbed into Tamil, Telugu, and Hindi. Kalapani won multiple awards and was widely praised for its historical narrative and cinematography.

In 1997, Priyadarshan directed two commercially successful films: Chandralekha in Malayalam and Virasat in Hindi, the latter being an adaptation of Bharathan's Tamil film Thevar Magan. In 1998, he directed three Hindi films—Saat Rang Ke Sapne (a remake of Thenmavin Kombathu), Doli Saja Ke Rakhna (inspired by Aniyathi Pravu), and Kabhi Na Kabhi—all of which underperformed at the box office. In 1999, he collaborated with Mammootty for Megham, marking their first film together in several years.

=== 2000–2016 ===
In 2000, Priyadarshan directed Hera Pheri, a Hindi adaptation of the Malayalam film Ramji Rao Speaking (1989). The film, starring Akshay Kumar, Sunil Shetty, Tabu, and Paresh Rawal, became a box office success and is regarded as a landmark in Hindi cinema. It also marked the beginning of a long-term collaboration between Priyadarshan and Akshay Kumar, while Paresh Rawal became a regular in many of his subsequent films.

Following Hera Pheri, Priyadarshan directed several Hindi films, including Yeh Teraa Ghar Yeh Meraa Ghar, Hungama, Hulchul, Garam Masala, and Kyon Ki. In 2000, he also directed Raakilipattu, a bilingual Malayalam-Tamil thriller (Snegithiye in Tamil), starring Tabu and Jyothika. Adapted from the Marathi film Bindhaast, the film was notable for its all-female cast and received critical acclaim. While the Tamil version was released in 2000, the Malayalam version and a dubbed Hindi version (Friendship) were released in 2007.

Priyadarshan's English-language epic period film titled The Last Revolutionary, produced by 20th Century Fox and based on the life of Indian freedom fighter Chandra Shekhar Azad was planned for filming in 2001 but was eventually shelved. During this time, Kamal Haasan was working on Anbe Sivam and approached Priyadarshan to direct it. Pre-production commenced, but Priyadarshan left the project due to creative differences, leading to Sundar C. taking over as director. In 2001, Priyadarshan directed the comedy film Kakkakuyil, reuniting Mohanlal and Mukesh, a successful duo from the 1980s and 1990s. The film became a box-office hit. However, his next two Malayalam films, Kilichundan Mampazham (2003) and Vettam (2004), had only an average performance at the box office, prompting him to shift focus toward Bollywood. In Hindi cinema, Priyadarshan maintained his success with films such as Chup Chup Ke, Bhagam Bhag, Malamaal Weekly, Dhol, Bhool Bhulaiyaa, De Dana Dan, and Mere Baap Pehle Aap. However, subsequent films like Billu, Bumm Bumm Bole, Khatta Meeta, Aakrosh, and Tezz did not meet expectations at the box office. His 2013 film Rangrezz also failed commercially.

Priyadarshan released Kanchivaram, a film about weavers in Kanchipuram. Prakash Raj won the National Film Award for Best Actor in 2008 for his performance. Kanchivaram also won awards at film festivals.

Returning to Malayalam cinema, Priyadarshan directed Arabeem Ottakom P. Madhavan Nayarum in Oru Marubhoomikkadha, starring Mohanlal. However, his subsequent films Geethaanjali (2013) and Aamayum Muyalum (2014) were box-office failures.

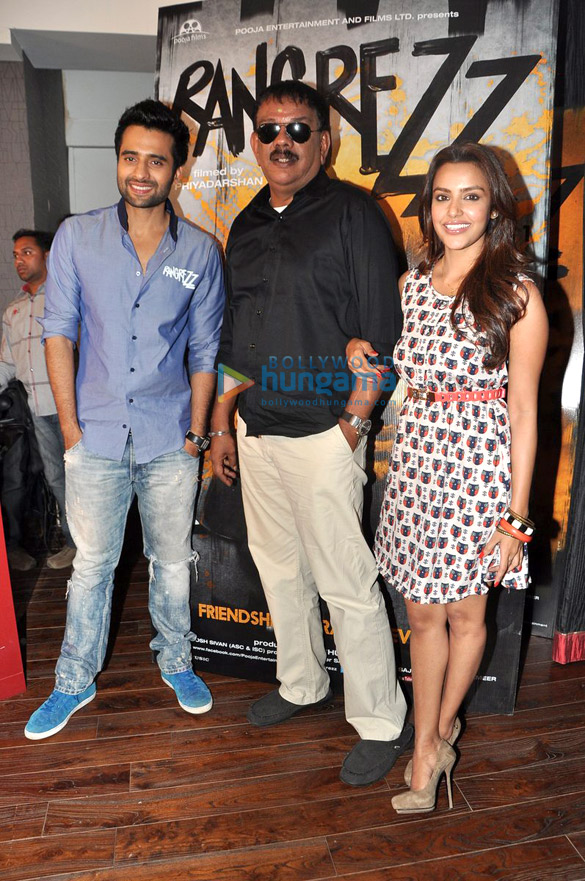
Priyadarshan promoting Rangrezz with Jackky Bhagnani and Priya Anand in 2013

In late 2015, Priyadarshan announced a crime thriller in Malayalam with Mohanlal. The production was confirmed, and the title Oppam was announced in December 2015. Due to weather constraints in Russia, another big-budget Mohanlal film was delayed, allowing Priyadarshan to begin work on Oppam. The screenplay and dialogues, written by Priyadarshan based on a story by Govind Vijayan, received positive reviews and became a blockbuster, breaking records and becoming the highest-grossing Malayalam film of the year within 16 days of release.

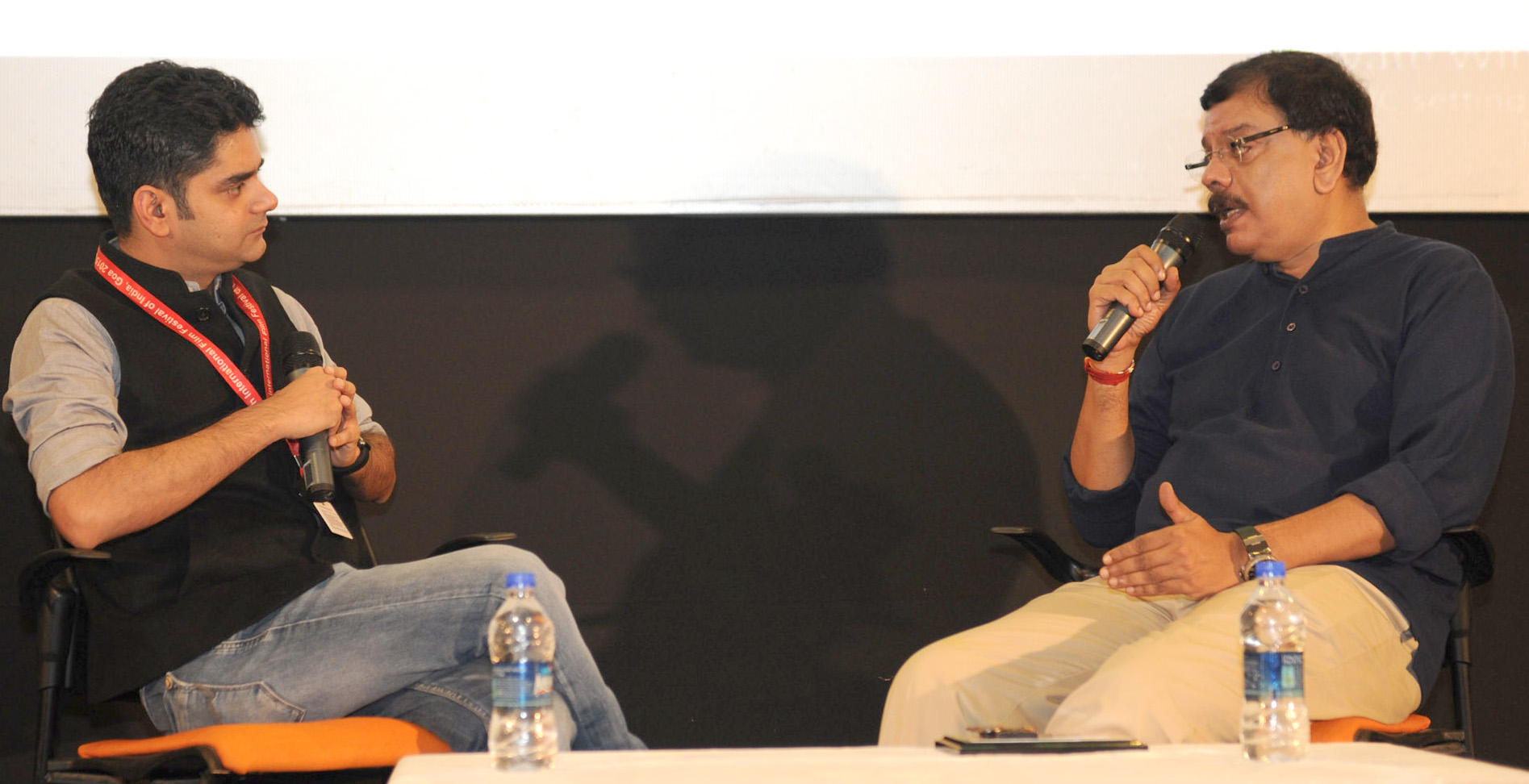
Priyadarshan at 46th International Film Festival of India in 2015

=== 2018–present ===
In early 2018, Priyadarshan began pre-production on Marakkar: Arabikadalinte Simham, a Malayalam-language historical period film set in the 16th century. The film, starring Mohanlal, is based on the battle exploits of Kunjali Marakkar IV—the naval chieftain of the Zamorin of Calicut who organized the first naval defense of the Indian coast by safeguarding Calicut from Portuguese invasion for almost a century. The film was released on December 2, 2021, and while it received mixed reviews, it failed at the box office due to its high production costs.

Before the release of Marakkar, Priyadarshan directed a spiritual sequel to his 2003 Hindi film Hungama, titled Hungama 2. Released directly on 23 July 2021 on Disney+ Hotstar, the film received negative reviews. It was loosely based on Priyadarshan's 1994 Malayalam film Minnaram.

In 2023, Priyadarshan produced and directed Corona Papers, a Malayalam film starring Shane Nigam. The film, an official remake of the Tamil film 8 Thottakkal (inspired by Akira Kurosawa's 1949 Stray Dog), was released on April 6, 2023. It received positive reviews and was a moderate success at the box office.

In the same year, Priyadarshan directed the Tamil film Appatha, starring Urvashi in the lead role. Released directly on 29 July 2023 on JioCinema, the film was celebrated as Urvashi's 700th project and was showcased at the Shanghai Cooperation Organisation Film Festival.

In 2024, Priyadarshan announced the release of Bhooth Bangla, a horror-comedy film starring Akshay Kumar, marking their long-awaited collaboration after 14 years.

In August 2025, he announced his intention to retire following the completion of several landmark projects, including Bhoot Bangla, Haiwaan, Hera Pheri 3, and a highly anticipated 100th film starring his longtime collaborator Mohanlal. He is currently filming Hindi thriller Haiwaan a remake of his own Malayalam film Oppam starring Akshay Kumar and Saif Ali Khan, which will also feature a cameo appearance by Mohanlal. Priyadarshan also confirmed plans to helm Hera Pheri 3. The director expressed that he feels "tired" and hopes to step away from active filmmaking upon completing these projects.

== Commercials ==
Priyadarshan has directed numerous television commercials films for brands such as Coca-Cola, American Express, Nokia, Parker Pens, Asian Paints, Kinley, and Max New York Life Insurance.

== Personal life ==
He married actress Lissy on 13 December 1990. They have two children, actress Kalyani and Sidharth. The couple divorced on 1 September 2016, after 26 years of marriage.

In March 2026, Priyadarshan confirmed that he had reconciled with his former wife Lissy, nearly a decade after their divorce in 2016. He stated that although they have not remarried, they are living together and sharing their lives again.

== Awards and honours ==
Priyadarshan has received numerous awards from both the State and Central governments, as well as from various film organizations. He has won the prestigious National Film Award three times and has been recognized for his exceptional contributions to Indian cinema.

=== National Film Awards ===
- 2007: Best Feature Film – Kanchivaram (Golden Lotus)
- 2007: Best Feature Film (Producer) – Kanchivaram (Golden Lotus)
- 2019: Best Feature Film – Marakkar: Lion of the Arabian Sea (Golden Lotus)
- 1996: Best Art Direction – Kalapani (Sabu Cyril)
- 1996: Best Cinematography – Kalapani (Santosh Sivan)

=== Civilian Awards ===
- 2012: Padma Shri (India's fourth-highest civilian award)

=== Kerala State Film Awards ===
- 1994: Best Film with Popular Appeal and Aesthetic Value – Thenmavin Kombathu
- 1995: Second Best Film – Kaalapani

=== Kerala Film Critics Association Awards ===
- 1991: Best Popular Film – Kilukkam
- 2016: Best Film – Oppam
- 2016: Best Director – Oppam

=== Filmfare Awards ===
- 1997: Best Film (Critics) – Virasat
- 2009: Best Director (Tamil) – Kanchivaram

=== Special Recognitions ===
- 2008 – Special Honour Jury Award – for Outstanding contributions to Indian Cinema
- 2008 – Special Jury Award at Chennai & Jaipur International Film Festival – 'Sila Samayangalil', an art movie on AIDS awareness.
- 2010 – Jaihind Rajat Mudra Award
- 2016 – Asiavision Award for Best Director – Oppam
- 2019 – Kishore Kumar Award by the Government of Madhya Pradesh
- 2022 – Honorary doctorate (D.Litt) – Hindustan Institute of Technology and Science.

=== Academic and Institutional Recognitions ===
- 2013: Excellence Award – Hindustan University, Chennai
- 2011-2014: Chairman – Kerala State Chalachithra Academy
- 2011-2014: Director – International Film Festival of Kerala

=== Government Appointments ===
- 2001: Chairman - Kerala State film Awards
- 2022: Chairman - National Film Awards - Best Film Friendly State
- 2019: Chairperson – Feature Films Jury, 50th International Film Festival of India (IFFI)
- 2016: Central Jury Chairperson – 64th National Awards (President's Award for 2016)

Sports and Social Contributions

- Columnist – Malayala Manorama Newspaper (for international cricket matches in Kerala)
- Chairperson – Committee of Ceremonies, 35th National Games (2015)
- Director – Rising Star Outreach of India (2014–2019)
