= S. Kumar =

Indian cinematographer

- Born: Thiruvananthapuram, Kerala, India
- Occupation: Cinematographer
- Spouse: Kumari
- Children: 2

S. Kumar is an Indian cinematographer, who works in Malayalam, Tamil, Telugu, and Hindi film industry. His first independent work was with the film, Thiranottam in 1978. He is a founding member of the Indian Society of Cinematographers (ISC).

== Personal life ==
S. Kumar is married. His son, Kunjunni S. Kumar is also a cinematographer.

== Awards and nominations ==
- 1994 – Won: National Film Award – Special Mention (Feature film) – Parinayam
- 1993 – Won: Filmfare Award – Mushkurat
- 2004 – Won: Kerala State Film Award for Best Cinematography – Akale
- 1991 – Won: Kerala State Film Award for Best Cinematography – Kilukkam
- 2003 – Won: Asianet Film Awards – Pattalam
- 2005 – Won: Asianet Film Awards – Udayananu Tharam
- 2007 – Won: Vanitha Film Awards – Calcutta News

== Selected filmography ==
- Makal
- Nalpathiyonnu
- Njan Prakashan
- Jomonte Suvisheshangal
- Veeram
- Rajamma @ Yahoo
- Pullipulikalum Aattinkuttiyum
- Ezhamathe Varavu
- Indian Rupee
- Dus Tola
- Calcutta News
- Vinodayathra
- Vadakkumnadhan
- Udayananu Tharam
- Akale
- Vellithira
- Meesha Madhavan
- One 2 Ka 4
- Grahan
- Randam Bhavam
- Kakkakuyil
- Mazha
- Chandranudikkunna Dikhil
- Chinthavishtayaya Shyamala
- Yuvathurki
- Mazhayethum Munpe
- Gandheevam
- Guru
- Parinayam
- Paithrukam
- Midhunam
- Adwaitham
- Aavarampoo
- Johny Walker
- Muskurahat
- Kilukkam
- Dhanam
- Nirnayam
- Akkare Akkare Akkare
- Kadathanadan Ambadi
- Vandanam
- Aryan
- Chithram
- Nombarathippoovu
- Boeing Boeing
- Parayanum Vayya Parayathirikkanum Vayya
- Onnanam Kunnil Oradi Kunnil
- Punnaram Cholli Cholli
- Odaruthammava Aalariyam
- Poochakkoru Mookkuthi
- Thenum Vayambum
- Thiranottam
