= Shyama (film) =

- Poster
- Directed by: Joshiy
- Written by: Dennis Joseph
- Produced by: Joy Thomas
- Starring: Nadia Moidu; Mammootty; Mukesh; Sumalatha
- Cinematography: Jayanan Vincent
- Edited by: K. Sankunni
- Music by: Raghu Kumar (songs); Shyam (score)
- Production company: Jubilee Productions
- Distributed by: Jubilee Productions
- Release date: 23 January 1986
- Running time: 126 minutes
- Country: India
- Language: Malayalam

Shyama is a 1986 Indian Malayalam-language romantic thriller film produced by Joy Thomas under Jubilee Productions, directed by Joshiy and written by Dennis Joseph. It stars Nadia Moidu in titular role, and Mammootty in the lead roles. The film was remade in Tamil as Unakkaagavee Vaazhgiren. It is partially inspired by Gulzar's Kinara.

== Plot ==
Viswanathan, a famous filmmaker, is haunted by the death of his wife and a young man whom he accidentally hit while driving. Later he meets Shyama, the daughter of his friend, still struggling with the death of her boyfriend, the man whom Viswanathan had killed. They fall in love but Viswanathan tries to avoid her. In the climax, he reveals the truth to Shyama. He tries to leave the town but is stopped by her brother Chandran. They have a fight and Viswanathan is hurt. The film ends where Shyama and Viswanathan console each other and are united.

== Cast ==
Principal cast

- Nadia Moidu as Shyama
- Mammootty as Viswanathan
- Mukesh as Harikumar
- Lalu Alex as Chandran
- Sumalatha as Lakshmi
- K. P. Ummer as Menon
- Meena as Chandran's Mother
- Mala Aravindan as Appukuttan
- G. Anthony
- Azeez as Thomas John
- P. K. Abraham as Krishnan Nambiar
- Lalithasree as Sister

Cameo appearances

- Rajan P. Dev as Dance master
- Thampi Kannanthanam as Press reporter
- Joy Thomas as Press reporter

Dubbing artists

== Production ==
After the success of Nirakkoottu, Dennis Joseph started receiving offers from various producers. However, none of them materialized. After a few months, Joseph decided to ask Joshiy to take him as assistant director so that he could learn filmmaking. As he was planning to ask Joshiy, he got a call from Joy Thomas. He was informed that due to some issues a project with Kaloor Dennis and Joshiy did not work out. Joseph was asked to prepare a script with the same cast of in 4 days, as the shooting was planned to start 5 days from then. However, Joseph was reluctant as he could not prepare a script in the given time. Joshiy recommended Joseph to develop a script based on a story he had discussed with him on the sets of Nirakkoottu in Kollam. On their insistence Joseph finally agreed.

Shibu Rajav was one of Joseph's closest friends. Rajav had earlier made his debut as lyricist with Allimalarkkavu (1984). It was Joseph who recommended him as lyricists for the film. Raghu Kumar had earlier produced Joshiy's Dheera and had a commitment to him. Hence, he was chosen to be the music director. Joseph was asked to narrate a few scenes to Kumar so that he could compose the songs. The songs were composed in one morning, after which Kumar immediately left by flight to Chennai for meeting up with his assistant Rajamani so that the orchestration and other arrangements can be finalized. However, the song's lyrics hadn't been penned yet. The music was put into an audio cassette and given to Shibu Chakravarthy who boarded a train to Chennai, during when he wrote the lyrics with the aid of a headset and a cassette player. Joseph had not yet started to develop the script and had just made a rough outline of the story. The film's opening shot was with the 18th scene in Shyama's (Nadhiya Moidhu) house. However, Joseph had only written till scene 2 by then. As shooting was starting in 2 days, he began writing the scenes which featured Shyama's house first. He wrote the complete script in 2 nights and 2 days.

== Soundtrack ==
Shyama

Soundtrack album by Reghu Kumar
- Released: 23 January 1986
- Recorded: 1986
- Venues: Madras (now Chennai), Tamil Nadu
- Studio: Panchathan Record Inn
- Genre: Feature film soundtrack
- Label: Ranjini Music Company
- Producer: Joy Thomas

Reghu Kumar chronology
Thalavattam (1986)	Shyama (1986)	Aattakatha (1987)

The soundtrack consists of a total of 4 songs. The songs were composed by Raghu Kumar, with lyrics by Shibu Chakravarthy and Poovachal Khader. The film score was composed by Shyam. It was released on 23 January 1986 as an album on the Ranjini Music Company label. It was Dennis Joseph who recommended Shibu Chakravarthy as a lyricist for the film. Raghu Kumar was also a producer and had earlier produced Joshiy's Dheera. Since the film was a commercial failure Joshiy had a commitment to him. Hence, he was chosen to be the music director.

The song Poonkaatte Poyi is picturized on Mukesh and Nadia Moidu, set in the Kharaharapriya raga. All the film's songs were chartbusters and stayed in the charts for several months following its release. The song Chembarathipoove was a staple in marriages at the time. Shibu Chakravarthy had his breakthrough as lyricist through the success of the film's soundtrack.

Tracklist

Song	Singer(s)	Lyrics	Raga
"Chembarathipoove"	K. S. Chithra	Shibu Chakravarthy	
"Ekanthamam"	P. Jayachandran	Shibu Chakravarthy	
"Poonkaatte Poyi"	Unni Menon, K. S. Chithra	Shibu Chakravarthy	Kharaharapriya
"Swarnamedukalil"	P. Jayachandran	Poovachal Khader	

== Box office ==
The film was commercial success.

== Trivia ==
- Lal Jose had visited the set as part of an excursion from his school.
