= Dennis Joseph =

Indian screenwriter (1957–2021)

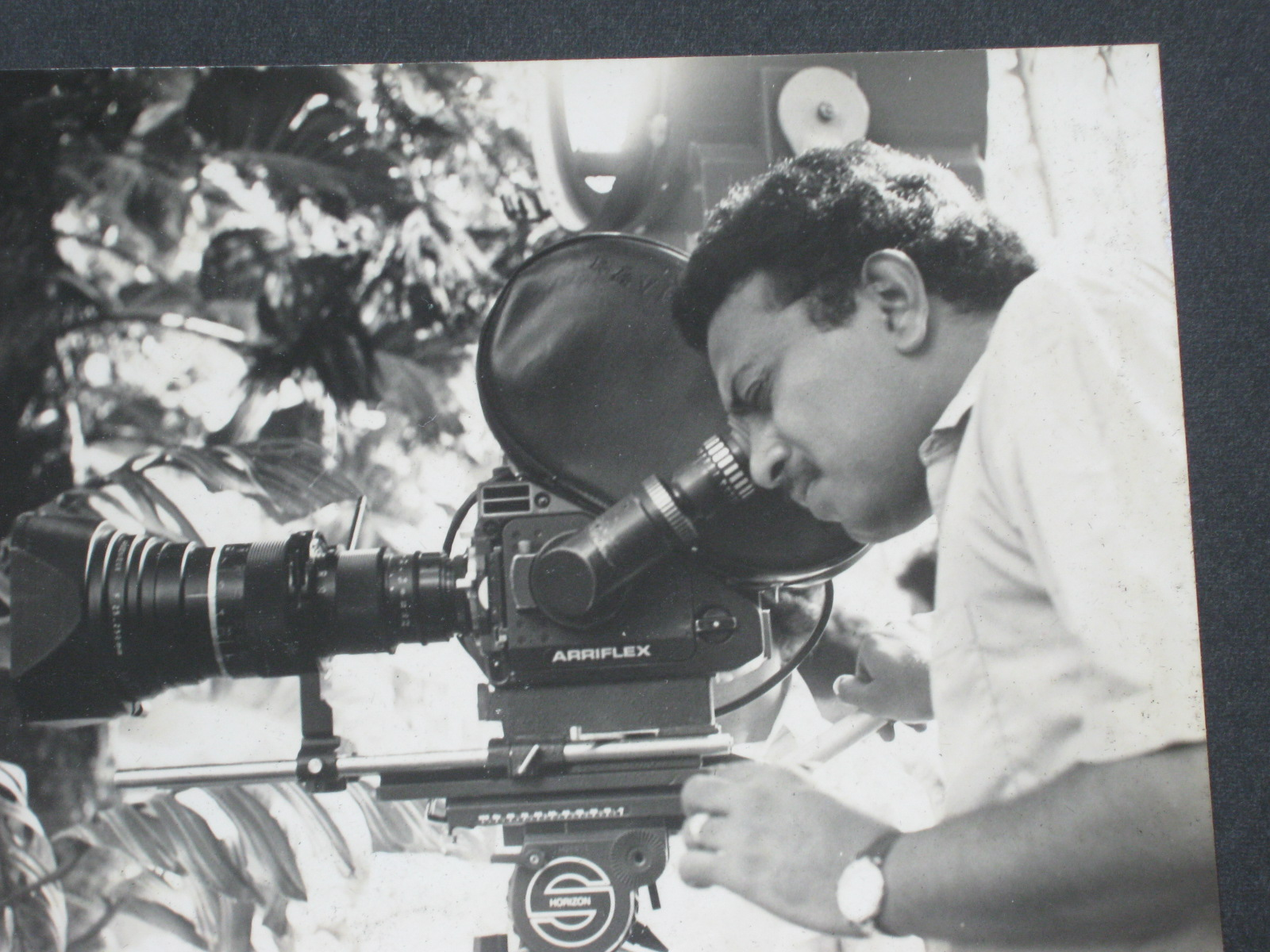
- Dennis Joseph in 1980's
- Born: 20 October 1957; Ettumanoor, Kottayam, Kerala, India
- Died: 10 May 2021 (aged 63); Ettumanoor, Kottayam, Kerala, India
- Education: Deva Matha College, Kuravilangad (Bachelor of Science)
- Occupations: Scriptwriter; Director; Journalist
- Years active: 1985–2021
- Spouse: Leena
- Children: 3

Dennis Joseph (20 October 1957 – 10 May 2021) was an Indian scriptwriter and director known for his work in Malayalam films. He was active during the 1980s and early 1990s. He frequently collaborated with directors Joshiy and Thambi Kannanthanam. He is known for scripting films including Nirakkoottu (1985), Rajavinte Makan (1986), Shyama (1986), New Delhi (1987), No.20 Madras Mail (1990), Kottayam Kunjachan (1990), Indrajaalam (1990), Akashadoothu (1993), Palayam (1994), and F.I.R. (1999). He also directed five films, including Manu Uncle, which won the National Film Award for Best Children's Film in 1988 and the Kerala State Film Award for the Best Children's Film in 1989.

== Early life ==
Dennis was born on 20 October 1957 in Ettumanoor, Kottayam district to M. L. Joseph and Eliyamma Joseph. His father worked in the Indian Air Force, while his mother was a local teacher. He was a nephew of actors Jose Prakash, Prem Prakash and cousins with bobby-sanjay. He was also the nephew to Francis, who would go on to be a producer of the 1974 film Shapamoksham. He attended the Ettumanoor Government High School, followed by Deva Matha College, Kuravilangad, where he studied for a B.Sc. degree in Chemistry and D.Pharm from lissy hospital kochi.

== Career ==
Dennis' career began at the Malayalam-language film magazine Cut Cut, where he worked as a sub-editor to the cartoonist B. M. Gafoor. During his stint at the magazine, he interviewed prominent actors in the Malayalam film industry, as well as spending time at filming locations. Dennis made his debut into cinema in 1985, as the scriptwriter for the Jeassy film Eeran Sandhya, a film which saw Mammootty star alongside Shobana, Rahman and Dennis' uncle Jose Prakash. He followed this by writing the screenplay for Nirakkoottu, also in 1985. Directed by Joshiy, Nirakkoottu, whose cast included Mammootty, Urvashi, Lizzy and Sumalatha, told the story of a prisoner who seeks revenge for his wife's murder.

Nirakkoottu was a success, leading Dennis to write a series of other films in the subsequent years. This included Rajavinte Makan, loosely adapted from Rage of Angels, a novel by Sidney Sheldon, which was released in 1986. Directed by Thampi Kannanthanam, this film was a huge success at the box office. Appearing as Vincent Gomas, a crime boss, Mohanlal successfully mesmerized the moviegoers and the film raised his stardom. Similarly, after around many flops, Mammootty was in the darkest days of his career in the period 1986–87, when Dennis scripted New Delhi. Directed by Joshiy, this film was also a loose adaptation of an English novel, Irving Wallace's The Almighty. Completely shot in and around Delhi, and went on to become the comeback film of Mammootty.

Dennis was to have made his directorial debut with Venmegha Hamsangal. The film was shelved after 7 days of filming due to the Gulf War. In 1988, Dennis made his directorial debut with critically acclaimed Manu Uncle starring Mammootty, and the film featured a comedic police officer played by Suresh Gopi. It won the National Film Award for Best Children's Film in 1988 and the Kerala State Film Award for the Best Children's Film in 1989.

Dennis continued writing scripts throughout the 1990s and 2000s; his last released film to date being 2013's Geethanjali, directed by Priyadarshan. He then took a hiatus from writing until 2020 when he announced a collaboration with director Omar Lulu on a film called Power Star.

== Personal life and death ==
Dennis was married to Leena and had three children – Elizabeth, Rossy, and Jose.

He died on 10 May 2021, in Kottayam from COVID-19.

== Filmography ==
=== As writer ===
Year	Title	Director	Notes	Ref.
1985	Eeran Sandhya	Jeassy		
1985	Nirakkoottu	Joshiy		
1986	Sayam Sandhya	Joshiy		
1986	Aayiram Kannukal	Joshiy		
1986	Shyama	Joshiy		
1986	Nyayavidhi	Joshiy	Dialogues Only	
1986	Veendum	Joshiy		
1986	Pranamam	Bharathan		
1986	Rajavinte Makan	Thambi Kannanthanam		
1987	New Delhi	Joshiy		
1987	Bhoomiyile Rajakkanmar	Thambi Kannanthanam		
1987	Kathakku Pinnil	K. G. George		
1987	Vazhiyorakazchakal	Thambi Kannanthanam		
1988	Dhinarathrangal	Joshiy		
1988	Thanthram	Joshiy		
1988	Sangham	Joshiy		
1989	Nair Saab	Joshiy		
1990	Indrajaalam	Thambi Kannanthanam		
1990	Kottayam Kunjachan	T. S. Suresh Babu		
1990	No.20 Madras Mail	Joshiy		
1990	Oliyampukal	Hariharan		
1991	Thudar Katha	Himself	Story Only	
1992	Kizhakkan Pathrose	T. S. Suresh Babu		
1992	Mahanagaram	T. K. Rajeev Kumar		
1992	Maanyanmar	T. S. Suresh Babu		
1993	Sarovaram	Jeassy		
1993	Arthana	I. V. Sasi	Story Only	
1993	Akashadoothu	Sibi Malayil		
1993	Gandharvam	Sangeeth Sivan		
1994	Palayam	T. S. Suresh Babu		
1995	Agrajan	Himself		
1995	Indian Military Intelligence	T. S. Suresh Babu		
1997	Bhoopathi	Joshiy		
1997	Shibiram	T. S. Suresh Babu		
1999	F. I. R.	Shaji Kailas		
2002	Phantom	Biju Varkey		
2004	Vajram	Pramod Pappan		
2005	Thaskara Veeran	Pramod Pappan		
2005	December	Asok R. Nath		
2006	Chirattakalippattangal	Jose Thomas		
2007	Abraham & Lincoln	Pramod Pappan		
2007	Ayur Rekha	G. M. Manu		
2009	Kadha, Samvidhanam Kunchakko	Haridas Keshavan		
2009	Patham Nilayile Theevandi	Joshy Mathew		
2010	Kanyakumari Express	T. S. Suresh Babu		
2013	Geethanjali	Priyadarshan	Dialogues Only	
2014	Thomson Villa	Abin Jacob		
TBA	Power Star	Omar Lulu		

=== As director ===
Year	Title	Notes
1988	Manu Uncle	Written by himself but credited as Shibu Chakravarthy
1989	Adharvam	Written by himself but credited as Shibu Chakravarthy
1990	Appu	Written by Sreekumaran Thampi
1991	Thudar Katha	
1995	Agrajan	
