= Soman Ambaat =

Indian director in Malayalam cinema

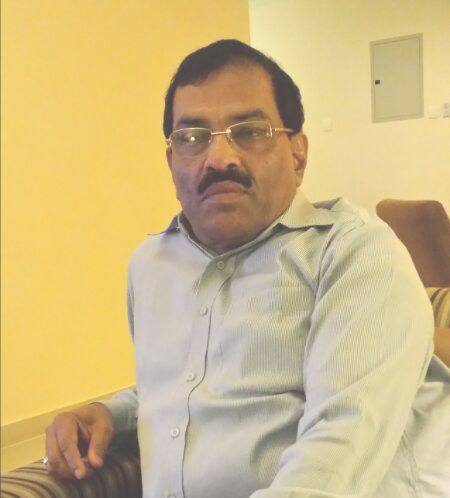
- Born: Kochi, Kerala, India
- Citizenship: India
- Education: Bharata Mata College, Kochi
- Occupations: Film director, screenwriter
- Years active: 1977 – present
- Spouse: Latha

Soman Ambaat (also spelled Soman Ambatt or referred as just Soman) is an Indian film director (Member of FEFKA) in Malayalam cinema. His debut film was Aayiram Abhilashangal (1984). This was followed by several films in Malayalam such as Manasariyathe (1984), Oppam Oppathinoppam (1986), and Agnimuhurtham (1987). He has also worked as Chief Associate director for movies like Jagadguru Adisankaran (1977), Shrimad Bhagwadgeeta (1977), Ashtamangalyam (1977), Harshabhaspam (1977), Pichipoo (1978, Manoradham (1978), Vilakkum veilchavum (1978), Aanakkalari (1978), Kolillakam (1981), and Ponnum Poovum (1982).

== Career ==
Born in Edappally, Kochi, Soman Ambaat completed his graduation from Bharat Mata College in Kochi. He left is banking profession to join the film industry. He started his career as Assistant Director to P. Bhaskaran followed by Associate Director for various films with directors like A. Vincent, P. N. Sundaram, P Gopikumar, Vijayanand and A B Raj. His first independent venture was Aayiram Abhilashangal in 1984, which was a suspense thriller with a varied film treatment. This movie starred Mammotty, Sukumaran, Soman, Maneka and Swapna in lead roles. He then directed Manasariyathe (1984) starring Mohanlal, Zarina Wahab, Nedumudi Venu, Sattar and Jagathy. Mohanlal starrer megahit Malayalam movie Drishyam (2013) movie had similar story line to the movie Manasariyathe. In 1986, he directed the movie Oppam Oppathinoppam starring Mohanlal, Menaka, Shankar and Lalu alex. In 1987 he directed a family drama Agnimuhurtam with Rateesh and Urvashi. His movie Ennum Maarodanaykkan in 1986 was not completed.

== Filmography ==
As Director

Year	Movie name	Cast	Music director
1984	Aayiram Abhilashangal	Mammotty, Sukumaran, Soman, Menaka and Swapna	A. T. Ummer
1984	Manasariyathe	Mohanlal, Zarina Wahab, Nedumudi Venu, Sattar and Jagathy	Reghu Kumar
1986	Oppam Oppathinoppam	Mohanlal, Menaka, Shankar and Lalu alex	Jerry Amaldev
1987	Agni Muhurtham	Rateesh, Urvashi, Mamukoya, Soorya, Santosh	S. P. Venkatesh

== Personal life ==
Soman Ambaat is married to Latha, daughter of film editor K Sankunni.
