= Aattakatha =

Aattakatha may refer to:

- Aattakatha (performance), a story for dancing and acting in Kerala, India
- Aattakatha (1987 film), an Indian Malayalam-language film starring Ratheesh and Anjali Naidu
- Aattakatha (2013 film), an Indian Malayalam-language film starring Vineeth and Meera Nandan

== See also ==
- Attakathi, a 2012 Indian Tamil-language film
- Attakathi Dinesh, an Indian actor
- Atthakatha, commentaries on the Pāli Canon
