= Paalayam =

Palayam
- Promotional poster
- Directed by: T. S. Suresh Babu
- Written by: Dennis Joseph
- Starring: Manoj K. Jayan; Mammootty (Cameo); Jagadish; Urvashi; Srividya; Ratheesh; Sai Kumar; Rajan P. Dev; Usharani; Santhosh; Prathapachandran; Janardhanan; Jose Pellissery; Kuthiravattam Pappu; Mohan Jose
- Cinematography: J. Williams
- Release date: 1994
- Country: India
- Language: Malayalam

Palayam is a 1994 Indian Malayalam-language film directed by T. S. Suresh Babu and written by Dennis Joseph, starring Manoj K. Jayan and Urvashi. Mammootty's character Christie appears in flashback and a stock footage from the film Kizhakkan Pathrose released two years earlier was used for the same.

== Cast ==
- Manoj K. Jayan as Noble
- Srividya as Susan Fernandez
- Mammootty as Christy (Cameo)
- Ratheesh as Shivankutty
- Urvashi as Jansi
- Jagadish as Mani
- Sai Kumar as Arun
- Rajan P. Dev as Member Kuttapayi
- Usharani as Mariyamma
- Santhosh as Thommi
- Prathapachandran as Adv Krishnankutty
- Janardhanan as Lorenz
- Jose Pellissery as Mathai
- Kuthiravattam Pappu as Thankappan
- Mohan Jose as Chellayya
- Poojappura Radhakrishnan
