= Indrajaalam =

1990 film by Thampi Kannanthanam

- Poster
- Directed by: Thampi Kannanthanam
- Written by: Dennis Joseph
- Produced by: Thampi Kannanthanam
- Starring: Mohanlal; Rajan P. Dev; Geetha
- Narrated by: Mohanlal
- Cinematography: Santosh Sivan
- Edited by: G. Murali
- Music by: S. P. Venkatesh
- Production company: Sharon Pictures
- Distributed by: Julia Picture
- Release date: 3 September 1990
- Running time: 152 minutes
- Country: India
- Language: Malayalam

Indrajaalam (transl. Magic) is a 1990 Indian Malayalam-language crime thriller film produced and directed by Thampi Kannanthanam and written by Dennis Joseph. The film stars Mohanlal, Rajan P. Dev and Geetha, with music composed by S. P. Venkatesh. It was released on 3 September 1990. The film became major commercial success and was major breakthrough for Rajan P Dev for his villain character Carlos.

== Plot ==
The plot revolves around the uprising of an underworld gangster.

== Cast ==
- Mohanlal as Kannan Nair
- Rajan P. Dev as Carlos
- Sreeja as Vinu, Kannan's love interest
- Geetha as Jayanthi
- A. T. Jose IPS as Commissioner David
- Vijayan Karote as Home minister K. G. Menon
- Anupam Kher as Maharashtra Chief Minister
- Vijayaraghavan as Thankappan
- Mohan Jose as Michael
- Jose Prakash as Baba
- K. P. A. C. Sunny as Adv.Narayana Swamy
- Sathaar as Chandrakumar
- Kunchan as Appu
- Sainuddin as Kuttan
- Prathapachandran as Baburaj
- Meenakumari as Mariyamma
- Balan K. Nair as Ayyappan Nair
- Ravi Menon as Ravi, Press Photographer

== Production ==
Action choreographer Sham Kaushal debuted with this film, who signed on in May 1990. One of Dennis Joseph's acquittances, Kennedy had recommended Rajan P. Dev to him after the success of the theatre play Kattukuthira. Thilakan was initially considered for the role of Carlos. However, they then decided to cast a new actor for the role. When they contacted Nana magazine, they recommended Rajan P. Dev for the role and he was eventually cast.. While not Rajan's first Malayalam acting performance, having acted in (around) 10 Malayalam movies by this time, Carlos was Rajan P. Dev's breakout role in the Malayalam movie industry. Having collected his advance for the role, Rajan P. Dev sought confirmation from Dennis Joseph that the amount, which appeared excessive to Rajan, was indeed meant for him and was not due to a clerical or accounting error. The day proved further fortuitous for Rajan, as the director T. Hariharan who was present during the discussion, committed a role for him in his upcoming movie Oliyambukal.. Filming took place mostly in Bombay.

== Soundtrack ==
The soundtrack was composed by S. P. Venkatesh.

All lyrics are written by O. N. V. Kurup, except where noted.

No.	Title	Lyrics	Artist(s)	Length
1.	"Dil Hai"	P. B. Sreenivas	S. P. Balasubrahmanyam
2.	"Kunjikkiliye Koodevide" (Female)		K. S. Chithra
3.	"Kunjikkiliye Koodevide" (Male)		M. G. Sreekumar
4.	"Paayunna Yagaashwam"		M. G. Sreekumar
5.	"Vilkkaanundo"		M. G. Sreekumar

== Release and reception ==
Indrajaalam was released on 3 September 1990, Onam day. N. Krishnaswamy of The Indian Express wrote, "High-speed cameras, sensitive film, innovative choreography of action and use of newfangled props have helped in this direction". Despite facing competition from three other Onam releases – Arhatha, Iyer the Great and Oliyampukal – it emerged the bigger success.
