= Rajadhani (1994 film) =

- Directed by: Joshy Mathew
- Written by: Mani Shornur
- Produced by: Stephen Njarakkal
- Starring: Babu Antony; Charmila; Innocent; Nedumudi Venu
- Cinematography: J. Williams
- Edited by: B. Lenin; V. T. Vijayan
- Music by: Johnson
- Production company: Pioneer Arts
- Distributed by: Pioneer Arts
- Release date: 19 September 1994
- Country: India
- Language: Malayalam

Rajadhani (transl. Capital) is a 1994 Indian Malayalam-language political action film directed by Joshy Mathew, written by Mani Shornur and produced by Stephen Njarakkal. The film stars Babu Antony, Charmila, Innocent and Nedumudi Venu. The film has musical score by Johnson.

== Plot ==
A political story of wickedness, greed and a change of heart.

== Cast ==
- Babu Antony as Abbas Amanulla Khan
- Charmila as Parvathykutti
- Innocent as SI Damodaran K. D.
- Nedumudi Venu as Panikker
- Baiju as Jaggu
- Jagathy Sreekumar as M. L. A Natarajan
- Vinu Chakravarthy as Rajamanyam Nadar
- Geetha as Asha Mathew I.A.S
- Meghanadhan as Muthu
- Prathapachandran
- Geetha Vijayan as Vineetha Menon
- Sukumaran as C. K. Radhakrishanan
- Shammi Thilakan as CI Minnal Rajan

== Soundtrack ==
The music was composed by Johnson.

No.	Song	Singers	Lyrics	Length (m:ss)
1	"Aayi Basanti"	S. P. Balasubrahmanyam, Chorus	Bichu Thirumala	
2	"Chelulla"	K. S. Chithra, Chorus, Malgudi Subha	Bichu Thirumala	
3	"Thulumbum"	K. J. Yesudas	Bichu Thirumala	
