= Black Forest (2013 film) =

- Directed by: Joshy Mathew
- Produced by: Baby Mathew Somatheeram
- Starring: Manoj K. Jayan; Meera Nandan; Ashokan; Baiju; Krishna Prasad; Kalabhavan Shajon; Master Akash; Baby Parvathy; Dinesh Nair
- Release date: 2013
- Country: India
- Language: Malayalam

Black Forest is a 2013 Indian Malayalam-language children's film directed by Joshy Mathew and his son Sudip Joshy and produced by Baby Mathew Somatheeram. The film stars Manoj K. Jayan,Meera Nandan, Ashokan, Baiju Santhosh, Krishna Prasad, Kalabhavan Shajon, Master Akash, Baby Parvathy and Dinesh Nair in lead roles.

The movie won the national award on Environment Conservation / Preservation for the year 2012..

== Cast ==
- Manoj K. Jayan
- Meera Nandan
- Ashokan
- Baiju Santhosh
- Krishna Prasad
- Kalabhavan Shajohn
- Master Akash
- Baby Parvathy
- Dinesh Nair
