= Hello Madras Girl =

- Poster
- Directed by: J. Williams
- Screenplay by: K. Balakrishnan
- Story by: J. Williams
- Produced by: J. Williams
- Starring: Shankar; Madhavi; Mohanlal; Rajkumar Sethupathi; Poornima Jayaram
- Cinematography: J. Williams
- Edited by: T. R. Sreenivasalu
- Music by: Gangai Amaran
- Production company: J.W International
- Distributed by: Hari Movies
- Release date: 24 January 1983
- Country: India
- Language: Malayalam

Hello Madras Girl is a 1983 Indian Malayalam-language action film produced, directed and filmed by J. Williams and written by K. Balakrishnan from a story by Williams. It stars Shankar, Mohanlal, Rajkumar Sethupathi, Madhavi, and Poornima Jayaram. The film features music composed by Gangai Amaran.

== Cast ==
- Shankar
- Madhavi
- Mohanlal as Lal
- Rajkumar Sethupathi
- Kaviyoor Ponnamma
- Poornima Jayaram
- Kuthiravattam Pappu
- Priyadarshan as Man in restaurant
- Urvashi
- Bheeman Raghu

== Soundtrack ==
The music was composed by Gangai Amaran and the lyrics were written by Poovachal Khader.

Song	Singers
"Aashamsakal Noorunooraashamsakal"	K. J. Yesudas
"Kandaaloru Poovu"	S. Janaki
"Maduramee Darshanam"	K. J. Yesudas, S. P. Sailaja
"Nirvrithi Yaamini"	Vani Jairam
