= Maya Mayooram =

- Poster
- Directed by: Sibi Malayil
- Written by: Ranjith
- Produced by: R. Mohan
- Starring: Mohanlal
- Cinematography: Venu
- Edited by: L. Bhoominathan
- Music by: Reghu Kumar (Songs); Johnson (Score)
- Production company: GoodKnight Films
- Distributed by: Manorajyam Release
- Release date: 1993
- Running time: 147 minutes
- Country: India
- Language: Malayalam

Maya Mayooram (transl. Illusive Peacock) is a 1993 Indian Malayalam-language romantic drama film directed by Sibi Malayil and written by Ranjith. It stars Mohanlal in a dual role, along with Revathi, Shobana, Thilakan, Sukumari, Kaviyoor Ponnamma and Shanthi Krishna in supporting roles. The songs featured in the film were composed by Reghu Kumar, while Johnson provided the background score. The film was produced by R. Mohan under the banner GoodKnight Films.

== Plot ==
Nanda who is an engineering graduate lives with her friend Vimala in Bangalore. After a public event, Nanda receives some photographs of her from the event, dropped at her doorstep by an unknown person. Initially, she ignores the matter, but is soon annoyed as she gets another set of pictures of her walking the streets and being in a restaurant, proving that someone has been stalking her. Her investigations into the stalker fails. One night, she shares a taxi with a Malayali stranger, who initially lies about him being a poorly educated villager trying for a job in Bangalore, and later admits of being the stalker. He introduces himself as Raghupathi, a commercial advertising photographer, who got interested in Nanda's features in an artistic perspective.

Later, Nanda decides to get the film negatives from him, and visits the ad agency he mentioned, only to find that he had lied; the real Raghupathi is also a Malayali, but not the stalker. Soon she receives a phone call from the stalker, who apologizes and give a new introduction as Mohan Tharakan, owner of a leading architecture firm. Nanda sets up an appointment to meet him, again to find that it was yet another lie; the real Mohan Tharakan, another Malayali, shows irritation on Nanda's cluelessness. Nevertheless, she gets the film negatives from another stranger, who directs her to a restaurant, which he says is owned by the stalker. Nanda and Vimala go to the restaurant to find that the owner is yet another person.

Nanda breaks down in the trauma of being stalked and pranked around multiple times. Seeing her upset, the restaurant's Malayali owner accepts his involvement in the prank, and directs her to the real location of the stalker. Eventually, at an exclusive party, Nanda finds the stalker, who is revealed as Narendran, an MIT graduate and lead architect in Mohan Tharakan's company. As Narendran starts to show off being smug and trying to be cute, Nanda slaps him in front of the crowd and walks out. Throughout the sequence, a blossoming love affair is being built into Nanda's vulnerable responses to events and Narendran's male confidence.

The movie then runs through usual song-and-dance sequences on Narendran-Nanda falling in love, them running and biking around Bangalore, and eventually getting engaged, etc. The story takes a turn when Narendran falls from a building and meets his death. A depressed Nanda escorts Narendran's body to his village in Kerala. To her surprise, in Narendran's house she finds someone looking exactly like Narendran, who we learn as his identical twin, Krishnan Unni. Initially, Nanda even thinks that Narendran is not dead and the death incident was yet another prank. We learn that Unni is secretly in love with Bhadra, an orphan girl who lives in his house as a servant. Since they knew that their relationship would never be approved by Unni's family they were hoping that Narendran would interfere and smooth things between them and family in order to get married.

Nanda and Bhadra become friends. Things go topsy turvy as Unni's mother and uncle decide to move a marriage proposal to get Unni and Nanda together. Even though shocked at first, Nanda gradually begins to feel positive about this. In the meantime, Unni's and Bhadra's relationship is revealed and everyone except Nanda who is ignorant of this blames Bhadra for wishing for someone who is completely out of her league. They fire Bhadra and ask her to leave. Heart broken, Bhadra attempts to commit suicide by making the serpent bite her in the Sarpa Kavu. Unni's uncle refuses to treat Bhadra, hoping that she would die and clear the way for Unni's and Nanda's marriage.

Seeing this Unni furiously grabs Nanda and drags her to Narendran's room where his photographs are hung. Unni asks if Nanda could easily forget Narendran and replace him with Unni just because they look alike. She is speechless and having realized her mistake begs Unni's family to treat Bhadra. They give her some medicines and wait for Bhadra to open her eyes, not sure whether she'll survive or not. While everyone is waiting for Bhadra to wake up, Nanda is seen begging Narendran that if God wants someone's life let Him take hers and not Bhadra's. After a long time Bhadra opens her eyes. Everyone is happy and they go to see Nanda in Narendran's room only to find her dead. Narendran's ghost is seen, who intends to take Nanda with him, clear to an astonished Unni. It is assumed that finally Unni and Bhadra get together with their family's approval.

== Cast ==
- Mohanlal in a dual role as:
  - Narendran (Appu)
  - Krishnan Unni (Unni)
- Revathi as Nanda
- Shobana as Bhadra
- Thilakan as Thanoor Shankunni Menon, an Ayurveda Doctor and Narendran's and Unni's maternal uncle
- Nedumudi Venu as Hassan Bhai
- Shanthi Krishna as Dr. Vimala
- Kozhikode Narayanan Nair as Mestri Madhavan
- T. P. Madhavan as Raghupathi
- Kaviyoor Ponnamma as Janaki, Narendran and Unni's mother
- Sukumari as Lakshmikutty Cheriyamma, Narendran's and Unni's maternal aunt
- Janardhanan as Mohan Tharakan
- Ottapalam Pappan as Naanu Nair
- Prem Prakash as Issac
- Aranmula Ponnamma as Grandmother of Narendran and Krishnan Unni
- Jose Prakash as Father of Nanda and a retd.and drunkard Colonel

== Soundtrack ==
The film features songs composed by Reghu Kumar with lyrics by Gireesh Puthenchery (except for "Kabhi Kabhi"). The background score was composed by Johnson. The song "Kabhi Kabhie Mere Dil Mein" from the 1976 Bollywood film Kabhie Kabhie was reproduced in the film. The soundtrack album was released by Super Cassettes Industries.

Mayamayooram (Original Motion Picture Soundtrack)
No.	Title	Singer(s)	Length
1.	"Neelambari"	M. G. Sreekumar, K. S. Chithra	4:53
2.	"Aamballorambalathil"	K. J. Yesudas	5:03
3.	"Kaikkudanna Niraye"	K. J. Yesudas, S. Janaki	4:43
4.	"Kabhi Kabhi"	K. S. Chithra	1:55

== Release ==
The film was released in 1993.
