= Oppam Oppathinoppam =

- Directed by: Soman
- Written by: Kaloor Dennis
- Story by: T. Sarath Chandran
- Produced by: K. H. Khan Sahib
- Starring: Mohanlal; Shankar; Menaka; Lalu Alex
- Cinematography: Divakara Menon
- Edited by: K. Sankunni
- Music by: Jerry Amaldev
- Production company: Krishna Hare Movies
- Distributed by: Krishna Hare Movies
- Release date: 3 October 1986
- Country: India
- Language: Malayalam

Oppam Oppathinoppam is a 1986 Indian Malayalam-language film, directed by Soman and produced by K. H. Khan Sahib. The film stars Mohanlal, Shankar, Menaka and Lalu Alex. The film has musical score by Jerry Amaldev.

== Cast ==
- Mohanlal as Krishnankutty
- Shankar as Gopinath
- Menaka as Rajamma
- Lalu Alex as Mathachan
- Madhuri as Devaki
- Mala Aravindan as Neelandan
- Meena
- Baby Rekha
- Sankaradi as Paramu Nair
- Adoor Bhavani as Karthyayani

== Soundtrack ==
The music was composed by Jerry Amaldev with lyrics by Bichu Thirumala.

No.	Song	Singers	Lyrics	Length
1	"Bhoomi Karangunnundoda"	K. J. Yesudas, Bichu Thirumala	Bichu Thirumala	4:19
2	"Kambili Megham Puthacha"	K. J. Yesudas, K. S. Chithra	Bichu Thirumala	5:35
3	"Puzhayil Ninnetho"	K. J. Yesudas	Bichu Thirumala	3:51
