= Veendum Lisa =

1987 Malayalam film

- Film poster
- Directed by: Baby
- Written by: Baby; Pappanamkodu Lakshmanan (dialogues)
- Produced by: Baby; London Mohan
- Starring: Kakka Ravi; Shari; Innocent; Babu Antony; Manorama
- Narrated by: Baby
- Cinematography: P. S. Nivas
- Edited by: G. Murali
- Music by: Raghu Kumar
- Production company: Asha Creations
- Distributed by: Asha Creations
- Release date: 4 September 1987
- Country: India
- Language: Malayalam

Veendum Lisa (transl. Lisa again) is a 1987 Indian Malayalam-language horror film. It is a sequel to the 1978 film Lisa. The film stars Shari in the titular role, Jayarekha, Kakka Ravi, and Manorama. The film was dubbed in Tamil as My Dear Lisa with a few scenes reshot.

== Plot ==
The story starts with Gomathi and her daughter visiting a temple. Here they meet Saraswathi, the daughter of late Shankara Iyer of the Shreehari Madom family. Knowing about their past relationship with the Shreehari Madom family, Gomathi arranges for Saraswathi's marriage with her son Kalyan, a doctor. After the wedding, they decide to go to Ooty for their honeymoon.

One day, Saraswathi happens to come across a picture of a girl in Kalyan's personal briefcase. On inquiry, he confesses that during his stay in London for his studies, he had met and fallen in love with a girl named Lisa. They had agreed to get married soon after his studies. But after he left London, he never saw her again. His parents disregard the idea of their marriage because Lisa is an orphan and also a Christian. Kalyan says that since he is now with Saraswathi, he will never look at any other girl and will remove Lisa from his mind.

Soon, there are drastic changes in Saraswathi's character. She starts behaving like a modern city girl and doesn't respect her elders. Shocked at this, Gomathi believes that Saraswathi may be possessed by an evil spirit. She hires an exorcist to perform an exorcism. It fails and Saraswathi starts behaving strangely again. During this time, three people are killed by an unknown force; they are Kalyan's best friend, Dr. Sharath, John Fernandes and his old mute servant, Parameshwaran. Kalyan is now completely frustrated and beats his wife in order to remove the evil lurking within her. To his horror, he finds out that the spirit is none other than Lisa herself.

Through Saraswathi, Lisa explains that she had arrived to India after Kalyan had left London. Eventually, she arrived at Ooty but did not find him. She met Sharath and John, who decided to give her temporary shelter until Kalyan came back. She was brutally raped and murdered by them along with Parameshwaran. Then they burn her dead body to ashes. Since then, she has been roaming in search of her killers. Through Saraswathi, she gained power and killed her killers one by one. She possessed Saraswathi because she wanted to be with her lover forever. Kalyan convinces Lisa that if she loved him dearly, then she would have to leave Saraswathi's body and go to heaven. Lisa leaves Saraswathi without any hesitation and bids him a tearful goodbye before she leaves for her heavenly abode.

The movie ends with the couple entering a cemetery and placing a bouquet of flowers at Lisa's grave.

== Cast ==
- Jayarekha as Saraswathi
- Kakka Ravi as Kalyan
- Manorama as Gomathi
- Shari as Lisa
- Innocent as Kalyan's father
- Babu Antony as John Fernandes
- Kamala Kamesh as Seetha
- Jagadish

== Soundtrack ==
The music was composed by Raghu Kumar and the lyrics were written by Poovachal Khader.

| Song | Singers |
|---|---|
| "Ente Premam Oru" | K. J. Yesudas, Sujatha Mohan |
| "Manjin Poomazhayil" | K. J. Yesudas |
| "Thushaaramurukum" | K. J. Yesudas |

== See also ==
- List of Malayalam horror films
