= The Gang (film) =

- Directed by: J. Williams
- Written by: Baburaj
- Starring: Vani Viswanath; Suvarna Mathew; Steffi; Jagadeesh; Spadikam George
- Cinematography: J. Williams
- Music by: Wilson
- Production company: Cochin Films
- Release date: 28 April 2000
- Country: India
- Language: Malayalam

The Gang is a 2000 Malayalam-language crime thriller film directed and cinematographed by J. Williams. Vani Viswanath, Suvarna Mathew, Steffi, Jagadeesh, Spadikam George. The film is produced under the banner of Cochin Films.

== Cast ==
- Vani Viswanath as Kathy Simon
- Napoleon as Kevin
- Baburaj as Joe
- Suvarna Mathew as Merlyn
- Steffi as Shyla
- Spadikam George as Lifeguard
- Abu Salim as Lifeguard
- Kalabhavan Mani as Stephen
- Cochin Haneefa as Moosakka
- Hemanth Ravan as Robert
- Rizabawa as Aaron
- Kazan Khan as Ajay
- Chali Pala as Sub Inspector
- Thalapathy Dinesh as Kamal
- Mafia Sasi as Alan
- N. L. Balakrishnan as News Reporter

== Production ==
In 1998, J. Williams came with Baburaj, the script writer, and narrated the film's story to Vani Viswanath, who found Baburaj's way of storytelling interesting. Viswanath was hesitant about whether she would get paid for the film or not, so she asked Baburaj for her paycheck. When Baburaj later asked her to return the money for an urgent need, Viswanath lied that she had given it to her father. Arjun was initially set to star in the film, but he left the film due to difference of opinion and was replaced by Napoleon.

Vishwanath later fell in love with Baburaj and married him in November 2002.

== Legacy ==
This was the first action film of Vani Viswanath, who later went on to establish herself as an action hero.
