= Agrajan =

- Directed by: Dennis Joseph
- Written by: Dennis Joseph
- Screenplay by: Dennis Joseph
- Produced by: Visual Creations
- Starring: Manoj K. Jayan; Ganesh Kumar; Thilakan; Rajan P. Dev; Nedumudi Venu; Sukumari
- Cinematography: Sunny Joseph
- Edited by: K. Sankunni
- Music by: Songs: G. Devarajan; Background Score: G. Devarajan; S. P. Venkatesh
- Production company: Visual Creations
- Distributed by: Visual Creations
- Release date: 1995
- Country: India
- Language: Malayalam

Agrajan is a 1995 Indian Malayalam film, directed by Dennis Joseph. The film stars Manoj K. Jayan and Ganesh Kumar in the lead roles. The film has musical score by G. Devarajan and S. P. Venkatesh.

== Plot ==
The story is set on the backdrop of the rivalry between top two newspaper companies in Kerala. P. T. Joseph of Kerala Bhoomi is set to go into strongholds of Kairali led by Govindan Nair by opening a new edition. This escalates the tensions between the two. While Kerala Bhoomi is the number one in circulation, Kairali has more financial assets and influence due to their diversified investments including cargo transport. Govindan, though a paraplegic due to a recent stroke, is the tactician and is assisted by his sons Madhavan and Raju, an apparent business degree holder from the United States.

The Kairali family arranges a hit and run to kill Joseph. Joseph's car is hit by a truck driven by Govindan's henchmen seriously injuring the newspaper baron. Joseph on his death bed reveals to his advocate that he has an illegitimate son with a former lover from his younger days when he was a professional drama artist. Joseph also registers a revised will before dying.

Joseph's family consist of his widow Annamma Joseph, son Anto Joseph and a grown up daughter. Anto appeared more interested in hunting than in managing the family business when his father was alive. His trusted confidant is his maternal uncle Itty, who stands by him throughout the story.

Anto and Itty set out to find the will of Joseph from his advocate. They are alarmed to realize that the will has been changed on his deathbed and the contents are not to be revealed for the next 12 months. Advocate advises Anto to arrange a suitable marriage alliance for his sister with in this 12 months hinting the will contains indiscriminating information that will tarnish the family's reputation. Anto and Itty bribes the advocate who reveals that 51% shares of the newspaper is set aside to Joseph Aravindan, Joseph's illegitimate elder son. Once the will executed Anto will have only 49% shares with no power over the running of the firm. This angers Itty, but Anto calmly requests the advocate to keep the information among them for the next 12 months.

Anto already was familiar with the name Joseph Aravindan who is a well known journalist in New Delhi. On further enquiries, it turns out that Aravindan lost his job for publishing an article against an influential central minister. He is running a drama troupe in alliance with the progressive left wing party. Anto meets Aravindan and offers him the post of Chief Editor of the Kerala Bhoomi with the primary task of exposing Kairali's illegal activities. Aravindan accepts the offer after Anto agrees to all his demands.

Anto reveals his plans to Itty. He is convinced that Govindan arranged the killing of his father. By setting out Aravindan against Govindan, he can destroy them both before the will is executed.

Aravindan takes charge and his first attempt is to find information on rumoured smuggling of illegal spirit in Govindan's trucks. He learns the whereabouts of the next load from an old truck driver, Kottuvadi Kunjachan. He reveals the information to Anto before setting out to stop the truck himself. Anto passes the information to Govindan with an anonymous call after ensuring it is too late to stop the truck. Aravindan stops the truck and hands over the load to Excise inspectors. He also writes an editorial with all the information on illegal smuggling by Kairali. It is revealed on the same night that the truck contains a chemical called Carbon Tetrachloride which does not belong to illegal smuggling. Anto is forced to burn off all his newspaper copies that night before it reaches the subscribers. A disappointed Aravindan hands over his resignation to Anto.

Anto, though disappointed with the failed attempt, convinces Aravindan to stay. Govindan grews suspicious why Anto is persisting with Aravindan despite the failure, asks his sons to dig into Aravindan's past. Aravindan meanwhile grows close to a girl, Sreedevi, who helps him with his investigation.

Kairali announces the launch of a new shipyard with Japanese collaboration. Madhavan inadvertently reveals to Anto that the full investment is for Kairali and the Japanese just provides technology. Aravindan grows suspicious of the source of income of Kairali as the government limits access to foreign currency for Indian companies. He does some calculations and concludes that Kairali's revenues alone can not fund such a venture. He speculates that Kairali either has foreign assistance or they are into counterfeiting foreign currency.

Sreedevi tells Aravindan about an old master counterfeiter Mayyanadu Iyyappan. Aravindan visits Iyyappan undercover to learn the tricks of the trade. Iyyappan, who turns out to be Sreedevi's father mentions Carbon Tetrachloride as one of the ingredients of making printing ink for counterfeiting. Aravindan further bribes Kairali's watcher Velappan who reveals that it is Raju himself who is working on the printers in the night. Aravindan manages to enter Kairali's building and capture photographs of Raju in the act. He also end up kidnapping a staff who sees him in the building.

Aravindan informs Anto of all this and goes into writing with the intention of publishing the material on Easter Sunday after the press closes for 2 days. Anto invites Aravindan for dinner with his family on Maundy Thursday with an apparent reference to last supper. Even though Anto has an emotional family moment with Aravindan during his visit, he goes ahead and make another anonymous call to Govindan about Aravindan's plan.

Govindan, by this time aware of Aravindan's true identity makes out Anto's plan. He responds to Anto that he is not going to do anything with Aravindan as he trusts his old friend Joseph's son not to publish such material against him. Sensing his plan spoiled, Anto decides to take matters on his hand. On good Friday, he sets of from home with Itty pretending to go on traditional pilgrimage to Malayattoor church. He asks Itty to go alone to church and provide him alibi while he goes to Aravinda.

Aravindan accepts Anto's invitation to go on a hunting trip to Kodanadu forest. Once in the forest, Anto tries to shoot Aravindan with his hunting rifle. However Aravindan already has removed all bullets from the gun. Aravindan reveals that he knew Anto was his step brother ever since he received a letter from Joseph before he died. While the brothers reconciles, Raju appears and try to shoot at Aravindan. Anto saves Aravindan and in the ensuing fight, the brothers overpowers Raju, Madhavan and their henchmen with the help of Itty who arrives. Arvindan takes the injured Raju and Madhavan to their father. On a moment of rage, Govindan regains control of his body and tries to strangulate Aravindan, but dies of a heart failure in the attempt.

The film ends with Aravindan leaving to Delhi with Sreedevi after an emotional good bye to Anto and family.

== Cast ==
- Manoj K. Jayan as Joseph Aravindan/J.Aravindan
- Ganesh Kumar as Anto Joseph
- Thilakan as K.Govindan Nair a.k.a. Thurumbu Govindan
- Rajan P. Dev as Ittikuru/Kunjupalu
- Kasthuri as Sreedevi
- Nedumudi Venu as Malayala Bhoomi P.T Joseph a.k.a. Ouseph
- N. F. Varghese as Madhavankutty Nair
- Shammi Thilakan as Raju Nair
- Sukumari as Annamma Joseph
- Jose Prakash as Priest
- K. T. S. Padannayil as Mayyanad Ayyappan
- Kunchan as Velappan
- Kuthiravattam Pappu as Kottuvadi Kochukunju
- Jagannatha Varma as Nambiyar
- A.T. Jose as Lawyer
- Renuka as Kunju Lakshmi

== Trivia ==
- Shammy Thilakan plays the son of his real life father
- Thilakan plays a paraplegic antagonist for the second time after Kaalal Pada
- Nedumudi Venu plays a man with illegitimate children. He followed this up with similar roles later in movies like Thachiledathu Chundan, Balettan
- The plot around leading rival newspaper companies of the 90s was repeated in Agnidevan and Pathram

== Soundtrack ==
The music was composed by G. Devarajan and the lyrics were written by O. N. V. Kurup, or were Traditional.

No.	Song	Singers	Lyrics	Length (m:ss)
1	"Etho Yugathinte" (F)	K. S. Chithra	O. N. V. Kurup	
2	"Etho Yugathinte" (M)	K. J. Yesudas	O. N. V. Kurup	
3	"Kaali Om Kaali"	P. Jayachandran, P. Madhuri, C. O. Anto		
4	"Kalike"	K. J. Yesudas	O. N. V. Kurup	
5	"Koojantham"	K. J. Yesudas, Chorus	Traditional	
6	"Urvashi Nee Oru"	K. J. Yesudas	O. N. V. Kurup	
7	"Yesu Mahesaa"	P. Susheela, Chorus	O. N. V. Kurup	
