= Thudar Katha =

Thudarkatha
- Directed by: Dennis Joseph
- Written by: Dennis Joseph
- Produced by: Thampi Kannamthanam
- Starring: Sai Kumar; Maathu; Sukumari; Devan; Rajan P. Dev; Vijayaraghavan; Sreenivasan
- Cinematography: PV Murugan
- Edited by: EM Madhavan
- Music by: S.P. Venkatesh
- Release date: 1991
- Language: Malayalam

Thudar Katha is a 1991 Malayalam language film. Directed by Dennis Joseph. Produced by Thampi Kannamthanam. The Film starrs Sai Kumar, Maathu, Sukumari, Devan, Vijayaraghavan, Sreenivasan. The Film has musical score by S.P. Venkatesh. The songs of this movie are very popular.

== Plot ==
Vishnu, who is from a middle-class family, falls in love with a princess. However, Vishnu's life takes a turn when the princess's parents are against their relationship.

== Cast ==
- Sai Kumar as Vishnu, the music teacher
- Maathu as Lakshmi the princess.
- Sreenivasan as Shivan (Vishnu's elder brother)
- Sukumari as Jaanuamma princess' caretaker
- Rajan P. Dev as receiver of the palace
- Devan as prince Ravi Varma
- Vijayaraghavan as Sudhakaran, receiver's son
- Jagathy Sreekumar as dance teacher
- Kunchan as English teacher
- Prathapachandran as Advocate
- Bobby Kottarakkara as Tonga rider
- Meena as the bedridden mother of Vishnu and Shivan
- Mohan Jose as police officer
- Jagannathan

== Official Soundtrack ==
The music was composed by S. P. Venkatesh and the lyrics were written by O. N. V. Kurup.

No.	Song	Singers	Lyrics	Length (m:ss)
1	"Manikya Kuyile Nee"	M. G. Sreekumar, K. S. Chithra	O. N. V. Kurup	04:03
2	"Alakha Puriyil"	M. G. Sreekumar, K. S. Chithra	O. N. V. Kurup	05:02
3	"Aathira Varavai"	M. G. Sreekumar, K. S. Chithra	O. N. V. Kurup	04:45
4	"Sararanthal Ponnum Poovum"	M. G. Sreekumar	O. N. V. Kurup	03:54
5	"Mazhavilladum"	K. S. Chithra	O. N. V. Kurup	04:20
