= Kaanaakkinaavu =

- Directed by: Sibi Malayil
- Written by: T. A. Razzaq
- Screenplay by: T. A. Razzaq
- Produced by: P. V. Gangadharan
- Starring: Murali; Sukanya; Mukesh; Mohini
- Cinematography: Venu
- Edited by: L. Bhoominathan
- Music by: Raghu Kumar
- Production company: Grihalakshmi Productions
- Distributed by: Grihalakshmi Productions
- Release date: 1996
- Country: India
- Language: Malayalam

Kaanaakkinaavu (transl. Unseen dream) is a 1996 Indian Malayalam film directed by Sibi Malayil based on a script by T. A. Razzaq. The film was produced by P. V. Gangadharan under the banner of Grihalakshmi Productions. The film stars Murali, Sukanya, Mukesh and Mohini in the lead roles. The film has musical score by Raghu Kumar. The film premiered at the Indian Panorama section of the IFFI and was theatrically released on 14 April 1996. The film was a commercial success. The film won the Nargis Dutt Award for Best Feature Film on National Integration. The film also won the Kerala State Film Award for Second Best Film.

== Plot ==
A widowed father (Mukesh) who entrusts his motherless children to his childless best friend Chandradas (Murali) and his wife (Sukanya) so they can grow up with both maternal and paternal love. Tragedy strikes when the father dies, leading to complex emotional and social consequences for the family.

== Cast ==
- Murali as Chandradas
- Sukanya as Sathi
- Mukesh as Hamsa
- Mohini as Laila
- Mammukkoya as Alikka
- Kuthiravattam Pappu as Ammayi kaakka

== Soundtrack ==
The music was composed by Raghu Kumar and the lyrics were written by Gireesh Puthenchery.

No.	Song	Singers	Lyrics	Length (m:ss)
1	"Ezhaam Beharinte"	M. G. Sreekumar, Sujatha Mohan	Gireesh Puthenchery	
2	"Jaalakathin Pinnil"	K. S. Chithra	Gireesh Puthenchery	
3	"Madhumaasa Chandran"	K. J. Yesudas	Gireesh Puthenchery	
4	"Nenjil Nira Mizhineerumaay" (D)	K. J. Yesudas, K. S. Chithra	Gireesh Puthenchery	
5	"Nenjil Nira Mizhineerumaay" (F)	K. S. Chithra	Gireesh Puthenchery	
6	"Nilaakaayalolam"	K. J. Yesudas	Gireesh Puthenchery	
7	"Nilaakkaayalolam" (Bit)	K. J. Yesudas	Gireesh Puthenchery	
8	"Omale Nin Kannil"	Biju Narayanan	Gireesh Puthenchery	
9	"Ullil Kurukkunna Venpiraakkale"	K. S. Chithra	Gireesh Puthenchery	
10	"Varshameghame"	Biju Narayanan	Gireesh Puthenchery	

== Awards ==
- Nargis Dutt Award for Best Feature Film on National Integration - P. V. Gangadharan
- Kerala State Film Award for Second Best Film - P. V. Gangadharan
