= Sher-E-Hindustan (1998 film) =

- DVD cover
- Directed by: T. L. V. Prasad
- Produced by: Rajiv Babbar
- Starring: Mithun Chakraborty; Sanghavi; Hemant Birje; Gavin Packard; Puneet Issar; Tej Sapru; Hemant Ravan; Gulshan Grover
- Cinematography: S. Navkant
- Edited by: Shyam Mukherjee; Kaka Malik
- Music by: Anand–Milind
- Production company: Aabha Films
- Release date: 16 January 1998
- Running time: 140 minutes
- Country: India
- Language: Hindi
- Box office: 45,000,000

Sher-E-Hindustan (Translated: Lion Of India) is a 1998 Indian Hindi-language action drama film directed by T. L. V. Prasad, starring Mithun Chakraborty, Sanghavi, Hemant Birje, Gavin Packard, Puneet Issar, Hemant Ravan and Gulshan Grover.

== Plot ==
Honest police inspector Kranti Kumar(Mithun Chakraborty) takes charge of a police station in a small village where mafia don Choudhary Charannath Lal Rai(Gulshan Grover) works as a minister and his gang terrorizes the entire village with the help of his own power, including his 4 children. Kranti takes hard steps against them. A village girl Naina falls in love with Kranti and after a while Kranti also reciprocates her feelings. A fight starts between Kranti and Choudhury's henchmen, and at last, Kranti defeats Choudhary Charannath and kills him along with all of his 4 children.

== Cast ==
- Mithun Chakraborty as Police inspector Kranti Kumar
- Sanghavi as Naina
- Gulshan Grover as Minister Choudhary Charannath Lal Rai
- Hemant Birje as Nagraj - 2nd son of Choudhary
- Tej Sapru as Jagraj - 1st son of Choudhary
- Gavin Packard as Dhanraj - 3rd son of Choudhary
- Puneet Issar as Police inspector Khulbhushan
- Hemant Ravan as Kishan, Police constable
- Madhoo as item dancer, special guest appearance
- Kasam Ali as Balraj - 4th son of Choudhary
- Sagar Singh - Sudhir Police Constable
- Hemant Bhatt - Raj Police Constable
- Inder Khosla - Chotu Police Constable
- Jeetu Gangavne - Gori Police constable
- Laxmi as Kranti's sister
- Lekha Govil as Kranti's mother

== Soundtrack ==
No.	Title	Singer(s)
1	"Dakiya Babu Daku Hai Pakka"	Sapna Mukherjee
2	"Mujhe Kambal Manga De"	Poornima, Abhijeet
3	"Chui Mui Chui Mui"	Poornima
4	"Chikne Chikne Gaal"	Vinod Rathod, Poornima
5	"Wo Ja Rahi Hai"	Abhijeet, Poornima
