= Eeran Sandhya =

- Directed by: Jeassy
- Written by: Dennis Joseph; John Paul (dialogues)
- Screenplay by: Dennis Joseph
- Produced by: Rajan Joseph
- Starring: Mammootty; Shobana; Rahman; Jose Prakash
- Cinematography: Anandakuttan
- Edited by: V. P. Krishnan
- Music by: V. S. Narasimhan
- Production company: Prakash Movietone
- Release date: 11 February 1985
- Country: India
- Language: Malayalam

Eeran Sandhya is a 1985 Indian Malayalam-language film, directed by Jeassy and produced by Rajan Joseph. The film stars Mammootty, Shobana, Rahman and Jose Prakash. This was the first film written by Dennis Joseph.

== Plot ==
Movie starts with a moody and serious Raju visiting a hill station estate. Madhavan(estate owner) picks him up from the bus stop and drives him all the way to the estate. During the journey, Madhavan reminds Raju to keep his background and the fact that he has committed a crime, a secret from others.

Madhavan introduces Raju to the key members of the estate, his wife Prabha and the steward Paulose. Madhavan reminds Prabha to make sure Raju feels at home. Prabha offers Raju a video cassette that covers an old wedding. A girl in the video (Reetha) gets him thinking about his past in a flashback.

Raju, a college goer, doesn't get along with his dad Krishna Menon and step-mom.. When he was a child, His father killed his mother and turned it as suicide.He had issues with his father because of this and also his step-mom.. Father shouted to raju and he ran away from home. Freddy, raju's close friend gave support to him. Raju joined Freddy's bar as supplier for his cost of living. Reetha, Raju's girlfriend was also supported him. She visited him occasionally with his half-sister who studies in school.

Fews days passed.. Reetha said she is going for 4 day ladies trip from her women's college. After that she never contacted Raju. This made him suspicious and further find out she had so much relationships other than him and found her romantically involving with Raju's step-brother. This made Raju triggered and he tried to kill Reetha. He harmed Reetha thus lead her in critical stage. For Raju's safety, his father and freddy send him to Madhavankutty. Thus the flashback ends.

He tried to find out peace in new place..l During this time Freddy met an accident and died. This burns him as he was only left who was with him. Prabha and paulochan (servant) gets friendly with him this time made him temporary happiness. Prabha went to visit her father with raju. This time, Madhavankutty went to delhi for raju's future.

One day, It was diwali which was also Prabha's Birthday, Raju and paulochan planned to celebrate it. During celebration Raju got emotional with his childhood memories of diwali with his mother.. Prabha tried to calm him but raju had physical with her. She was an unhappy wife too.. Raju was so disappointed for his act and tried to go somewhere. But Prabha was devastated and waited for Madhavankutty back from delhi. After he was back everyone was gloomy.. Madhavan tried to ask everyone but noone was ready to express.. Next day Paulochan visited him in office and told what happened. Madhavan took his pistol and drive to home but on the way he was stopped by Raju's father and told him that reetha had died and police took her death sentence that raju killed her.. Madhavankutty returned home, Prabha was in tears but Madhavankutty forgive her that he didn't done a husband's duty.. Madhavankutty rushed Raju to go delhi and with Prabha they went out to airport.. On the way to air port police tried to capture them. Police shoot raju but Madhavankutty carry him in his hands and ran but madhavan also got shot by the police which lead to Madhavan's death. Police arrested Raju and sent him to jail. Prabha cried loudly with tears as she left behind alone.

== Cast ==
- Mammootty as Madhavankutty
- Shobana as Prabha
- Rahman as Raju
- Jose Prakash as Krishna Menon
- Ahalya as Reetha Abraham
- Santhosh as Freddy Louis
- Adoor Bhasi as Poulose
- Sankaradi as Gopalan
- Sukumari as Seetha
- K. P. A. C. Sunny as Police Officer
- T. P. Madhavan as Avarachan
- N. F. Varghese as Police Inspector
- Ashokan as Ashok
- Baby Chaithanya
- Thilakan
- Shubha as Sumathi
- Balan Parakkal

== Soundtrack ==
The music was composed by V. S. Narasimhan and the lyrics were written by O. N. V. Kurup.

| Song | Singers |
|---|---|
| "Poovaam Manchalil Moolum Thennale" | Vani Jairam, K. G. Markose, Krishnachandran |
| "Randilayum" | Vani Jairam |
