= Ponnethooval =

Ponthooval
- Directed by: J. Williams
- Music by: Raghu Kumar
- Release date: 16 December 1983
- Country: India
- Language: Malayalam

Ponthooval is a 1983 Indian Malayalam-language film, directed by J. Williams. The film's score was composed by Raghu Kumar.

== Cast ==
- Ratheesh
- Madhavi
- Captain Raju
- Bheeman Raghu
- Kunchan

== Soundtrack ==
The music was composed by Raghu Kumar with Malayalam songs lyrics by Poovachal Khader and the English song lyrics by Anitha Reddy

| No. | Song | Singers | Lyrics | Length (m:ss) |
|---|---|---|---|---|
| 1 | "Abhilaasha Haaram" | K. J. Yesudas | Poovachal Khader | |
| 2 | "Darling" | Anitha Reddy | Anitha Reddy | |
| 3 | "Kanna Guruvayoorappa" | S. Janaki | Poovachal Khader | |
| 4 | "Priyathe Mizhineerilen" | K. J. Yesudas | Poovachal Khader | |
