= Onnanam Kunnil Oradi Kunnil =

- Directed by: Priyadarshan
- Written by: Priyadarshan
- Produced by: Raja Dennis; Ravi Dennis
- Starring: Shankar; Mohanlal; Lissy; Prem Prakash; Sukumari; Sankaradi
- Cinematography: S. Kumar
- Edited by: Ambi
- Music by: Raghu Kumar
- Production company: Dennis Brothers
- Distributed by: Central Pictures
- Release date: 29 March 1985
- Country: India
- Language: Malayalam

Onnanam Kunnil Oradi Kunnil is a 1985 Indian Malayalam-language screwball comedy film written and directed by Priyadarshan. The film stars Shankar, Lissy, Mohanlal, Sukumari, Prem Prakash and Sankaradi. The film has musical score by Raghu Kumar.

== Plot ==
Nithin and Anand are jobless roadside romeos from rich families. One day, Anand meets Shobha and falls in love with her. However, Nithin realizes that she is the daughter of his father's old friends. In an attempt to impress Shobha, Anand gets severely injured and the doctor suggests that he needs to be amputated. In the process of better treatment, his brother and Nithin take him to a hospital in Tamil Nadu, where his condition improves.

Anand writes letters to Nithin asking him to hand them over to Shobha. On his daily walks, Anand meets Meenakshi, an innocent girl who reminds him of his sister. They develop a strong bonding and Meenakshi starts seeing him as her long-dead brother who she believed would come back one day.

Once this condition is improved, Anand is back to see Shobha married to Nithin. He realizes that Nithin cleverly hid the fact that Anand is improving and never handed over the letters to Shobha. Instead, he made her believe that Anand is amputated and will never return. Shobha is now loyal to her husband and informs Anand that she will always be a faithful wife. Anand leaves the city and meets Meenakshi as her brother.

== Cast ==
- Shankar as Anand
- Mohanlal as Nithin
- Lissy as Meenakshi
- Pooja Saxena as Shobha
- Prem Prakash as Anand's brother Balan
- Sankaradi as Col. Raghavan Nair
- Sukumari as Nithin's mother Lakshmi
- Sreenivasan as Muthu
- K. P. A. C. Azeez
- Noohu
- Thodupuzha Vasanthi as Shobha's mother
- Vinduja Menon
- Lathika

== Soundtrack ==
The music was composed by Raghu Kumar with lyrics by Chunakkara Ramankutty.

No.	Song	Singers	Lyrics	Length (m:ss)
1	"Kunkumakkuriyaninju"	K. J. Yesudas	Chunakkara Ramankutty	
2	"Muthukkuda Choodi"	Satheesh Babu, Siballa Sadanandan	Chunakkara Ramankutty	
3	"Nee Paadivaa"	K. J. Yesudas, K. S. Chithra	Chunakkara Ramankutty	
4	"Sindooramegham Shringaarakaavyam"	M. G. Sreekumar, Mohanlal	Chunakkara Ramankutty	
5	"Vellithaalam"	M. G. Sreekumar, Siballa Sadanandan	Chunakkara Ramankutty	
