= Peruvazhiyambalam =

- Bharat Gopy, Ashokan and K. P. A. C. Lalitha in a still from the film
- Directed by: Padmarajan
- Written by: Padmarajan
- Based on: Peruvazhiyambalam by Padmarajan
- Starring: Ashokan; Bharat Gopy; Jose Prakash; K. P. A. C. Azeez; K. P. A. C. Lalitha; Ramesh; Geetha
- Cinematography: Kannan Narayanan
- Edited by: Ravi
- Music by: M. G. Radhakrishnan
- Production company: Prakash MovieTone
- Release date: 6 August 1979
- Country: India
- Language: Malayalam

Peruvazhiyambalam (transl. High Road Temple) is a 1979 Indian Malayalam-language crime drama film written and directed by P. Padmarajan, based on his novel of the same name. The film was Padmarajan's directorial debut and the acting debut of Ashokan, who played the central character, Raman. It was one of the last black-and-white Malayalam films.

The Hindu described this film as one of the finest films in Malayalam. It won the National Film Award for Best Feature Film in Malayalam. The film was included in IBN Live's list of 100 greatest Indian films of all time.

== Plot ==
Fifteen-year-old Raman lives alone with his older sister Bhagyam, their parents having died several years prior. The town bully Prabhakaran Pillai is killed by Raman. He escapes from murder charges by hiding from the police with the help of a teashop owner Viswambharan and a prostitute.

== Cast ==
- Ashokan as Raman/Mani
- Bharat Gopy as Viswambharan
- Jose Prakash as Paramu Nair
- Sukumari as Paramu Nair's wife
- K. P. A. C. Azeez as Prabhakaran Pillai
- Santhakumari as Prabhakaran Pillai's wife
- K P A C Lalitha as Kunnumpurath Devayani, the prostitute
- Krishnan Kutty Nair as Vaidhyan
- Valsala Premdevdas
- Chandrika
- Santhosh Kumar
- Muthukulam K.G.
- Giri
- George Joseph
- A.N. Nair
- V.T. Thomas
- Rathi
- Bobby
- Madhavikutty

== Accolades ==
National Film Awards

- Best Feature Film in Malayalam

Kerala State Film Awards

- Second Best Film
- Best Story – Padmarajan
