= Aayiram Kannukal =

1986 film directed by Joshiy

- Poster
- Directed by: Joshiy
- Screenplay by: Dennis Joseph
- Produced by: Rajan Prakash
- Starring: Mammootty; Ratheesh; Shobhana; Jose Prakash; Rajalakshmi
- Cinematography: Anandakuttan
- Edited by: K. Sankunni
- Music by: Raghu Kumar
- Production company: Prakash Movietone
- Release date: 15 August 1986
- Country: India
- Language: Malayalam

Aayiram Kannukal (transl. Thousand Eyes) is a 1986 Indian Malayalam-language film, directed by Joshiy and produced by Rajan Prakash. The film stars Mammootty, Ratheesh, Shobhana, Jose Prakash and Rajalakshmi in lead roles. The film had musical score by Raghu Kumar. The film was loosely based on the 1984 Tamil film Nooravathu Naal. The film was a box office failure. The film has however attained a cult status in the years following its release.

== Cast ==
- Mammootty as Dr. Sam / Samuel George
- Ratheesh as James
- Shobhana as Anu
- Jose Prakash as Dr. K. G. Varma
- Rajalakshmi as Suzy
- Baiju Santhosh as Patient
- Kundara Johny as Johnny
- Mala Aravindan as Kuttanpilla
- Kunchan as Jayan
- Prathapachandran as Anu's father
- KPAC Sunny as Fr. Alexander
- K. P. A. C. Azeez as Nana Editor
- Sukumari as Anu's Mother
- Lalithasree as Devayani
- Mohan Jose as Pimp
- Ragini as Thulasi
- Kanakalatha as Housemaid (Ammini)
- Rahman as Band Troupe Singer (Cameo Appearance)

== Synopsis ==
Samuel George alias Doctor Sam is a doctor at Cherupushpam Mental Hospital. Kuttanpilla is a marriage broker, and he brings out a proposal for Dr. Sam with Anu, a college student residing at a ladies hostel. Sam instantly fell in love at first sight on seeing Anu's photo. However, there was a misunderstanding when Kuttanpillai conveys the proposal to Anu, and Anu mistakes Sam to be a patient in mental hospital, and hence shows no interest in the proposal. Sam was annoyed with Kuttanpillai for creating such a scene.

When a relative of her hostelmate got admitted in the mental hospital, Anu and colleagues go for a visit. At the same time a drama was being planned with Sam enacting a mental patient. When the rehearsal of the drama was in progress at the hospital, Anu and friends reach there. On seeing Sam in a costume of a chained mental patient, Anu and friends get shocked and they ran away despite Sam running behind and trying to prove his innocence. On another day, Sam and his friend Jayan go for jogging. Anu and her friends too were also involved with jogging. When a stray dog chases Sam, he initially runs and then jumps a wall to fall in front of Anu and friends. By now, Anu is almost sure that Sam is abnormal.

Anu's friend and hostel mate Thulasi leaves home from the hostel as she has some health issues and that she prefers to avail treatment from her home. Thulasi also hails from Anu's native place. On a later day, Anu also leaves home. While Anu gets dropped from the transport bus, she finds Thulasi at the bus stop. When Thulasi was about to tell something, James, Anu's brother-in-law reaches there to pick up Anu to home and Thulasi takes leave. Anu finds out from her sister Suzy that Thulasi was having an affair with Johnny, who does not have an impressive job. When Anu and Suzy tries to convince Thulasi and come out of her affair, Thulasi tells her that she is bearing Johnny's child and now there is no other way. Anu has a dream that Thulasi gets murdered when a jeep hits her, however she ignores it. One day, Anu gets a letter from Thulasi telling that she is eloping that night with Johnny and she should not tell this matter to anyone else. At night, while Thulasi waits for Johnny, a jeep follows her and hits her causing her to fall from the bridge to the river. The dead body of Thulasi is found, and Anu is shocked to see that the dead body bears the same costume (red saree) as she had seen in her dream. Accepting the letter sent by Thulasi as proof, and other circumstances, Johnny is taken into custody and he is questioned by police. However he denies all.

In the meantime, the proposal from Sam reaches Anu's family, and after having a conversation with Sam, Anu is cleared of all confusions and she agrees for the marriage. After the marriage and honeymoon time, Anu dreams that her sister Suzy getting murdered by an unknown person wearing a hat. She also sees someone with a bald head in the dream. Anu wakes up frightened, and she asks Sam to take her to her Suzy's house and reveals of her dream. However Sam consoles her and they call to Suzy's house to confirm everything is alright. James was about to take leave for Trivandrum. After the call, since Anu was not able to fall asleep, Sam gives her a tablet and she was able to drift to sleep. James leaves to Trivandrum. Suzy gets murdered that night in the same way as Anu dreamt, and Anu is put to grief as she couldn't prevent the murder despite having a hint.

Though police wanted to question Anu, Sam prevents it. Anu again dreams of a murder in which there was a lady, a building with two outdoor lamps, a table with film magazine (Nana) bearing the Eiffel Tower of Paris as its cover page, and a musical band performing on stage with a song beginning with "Dreams". Anu reveals about the dream to Sam and James. They set out to enquire with the film magazine office and the band troupe, and was quite dejected when the film magazine office denies of any issue with such a cover page and also informed that they do not wish to put Eiffel Tower as cover page. The musical band also denies that they do not have a song beginning with the word Dreams. Sam withdraws from any further investigations. However, with the help of James, Anu still continues to enquire. Though they trace a house having the same lights in dream, it was a brothel and there were some harsh outcomes for enquiring into the activities of a brothel. Sam also takes Anu to his professor Dr. K. G. Varma for a check-up. However all tests reveal that there is no problem with Anu. But the Varma warns Sam to be alert with the dreams and not to ignore if Anu dreams again. Varma also tells that he is being transferred to Kozhikkode, which is quite far.

When Anu dreams of the same murder again, Sam pays visit to Dr. Varma. It was on the same day the club was celebrating an anniversary function. Sam had instructed Anu to attend the function with James. Though James was also engaged, he promises to be back by evening and take Anu for the function. However, when James seemed to get late, Anu leaves to the club alone. While at the club, Anu happens to see the film magazine with Eiffel Tower as cover page. She also sees the musical band performing "Dreams" song... Since this was coinciding with her dream, she rushes to James house.

It is then revealed that James was the killer all along. James has a brain tumor and he cannot be treated or operated on. He goes through splitting headaches when exposed to bright light and after that when he sees the red color, he turns out of control and will then only stop after he has murdered the person wearing the red dress. In the case of Thulasi, a vehicle from the opposite side shone its headlights and when he recovered, his eyes were blood shot and he sees Thulasi clad in a red saree and it was his jeep that runs her down. He then goes to the church to confess his sin to the local priest. With Suzy, he went through a similar ordeal as it was a thunderstorm that night and he cannot proceed with his trip and returns home. He tried to warn Suzy to run away and hide from him. But once he got into the mode, he had to kill her as well as her dress had red on it. He again goes to the church for confession. He does try to murder Anu as well and they rush up the building and have a chase on the terrace. Sam reaches there in the nick of time and controls James. But James filled with guilt over what he has done and his health condition - jumps from the roof to his death. The movie ends with Sam and Anu still shocked about what happened.

== Soundtrack ==
Aayiram Kannukal

Soundtrack album by Raghu Kumar
- Released: 1986
- Genre: Feature film soundtrack
- Language: Malayalam, English

=== Track listing ===
All lyrics are written by Shibu Chakravarthy; all music is composed by Raghu Kumar.

Original songs
No.	Title	Singer(s)	Length
1.	"Athyunnathangalil"	S. Janaki, Chorus
2.	"Dreams"	Antony Isaac
3.	"Ee Kulir Nisheedhiniyil"	S. Janaki, Unni Menon
