= Rajan P. Dev =

Indian film actor and stage actor

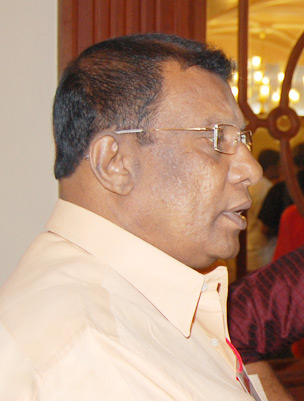
- Dev at the 2008 A.M.M.A meeting in Kochi
- Born: 20 May 1951; Cherthala, State of Travancore-Cochin, India (present-day Alappuzha, Kerala, India)
- Died: 29 July 2009 (aged 58); Kochi, Kerala, India
- Education: St. Michael's College, Cherthala; Sree Narayana College, Cherthala
- Occupations: Actor; film director
- Years active: 1980 – 2009
- Spouse: Santhamma
- Children: 3
- Parents: S. J. Dev; Kuttyamma

Rajan P. Dev (20 May 1951 – 29 July 2009) was an Indian film and stage actor. He was born in Cherthala in the Alappuzha district of the former state Thiru-Kochi (present day Kerala). He acted in over 500 films in Malayalam, Tamil, Telugu and Kannada languages. He was noted for his villain roles laced with a touch of humour. He came into the limelight for his characterisation of Kochuvava in the play Kattukuthira. Rajan P. Dev died in Kochi Wednesday 29 July 2009 due to a liver disease.

== Family ==
Rajan P. Dev was born to Devassia who was known as S. J. Dev, a popular stage and drama actor of his times, and Kuttyamma in 1951 at Cherthala. He has a sister, Raniyamma. He had his education from Govt. Boys Higher Secondary School, Cherthala, St. Michael's College, Cherthala and Sree Narayana College, Cherthala.

Rajan P. Dev was married to Shanthamma. The couple had three children; Asha, Jubil Raj and Unni. Asha is married to Binoy, a hotel businessman. Jubil Raj has been an actor since 2009. He has done more than 20 movies in Malayalam and Tamil. He has done some major roles in Yakshiyum Njanum, Thappana, Thank You, Daivathinte Swantham Cleetus, KQ, Welcome to Central Jail, King Liar, An International Local Story, Maffi Dona, Kaaval, etc. His younger son Unni also acted in movies like Zachariayude Garbhinikal, Aadu and its sequel.

== Stage career ==
Rajan P. Dev, born to stage actor S. J. Dev and Kuttyamma, started his acting career with various professional play troupes in Kerala. His father remained one of his major influences. He was noted for his performances in various plays in the troupe of senior stage actor N. N. Pillai. He was cast by S. L. Puram Sadanandan to do the protagonist role of Kochuvava in his play Kattukuthira. The play was staged in over 100 venues and Dev became immensely popular all over Kerala. He received the Kerala State Theater Best Actor Award in 1984 and 1986. Along with his successful stage career, Dev launched his film career. Despite his success in films, he maintained a steady relationship with stage plays. He founded the play troupe Jubilee Theatres; and for its plays he did creative contributions in various departments. The last play by Jubilee Theatres, a satire titled Amminipuram Gramapanchayat had its lyrics and music by Dev.

== Film career ==
Dev launched his film career with Ente Mamattikkuttiyammakku (1983), directed by Fazil. When his superhit play Kattukuthira was made into a film, the role went to Thilakan. Dev expressed his disappointment on this in a magazine interview, which caught the attention of director Thampy Kannanthanam. He invited Dev to play the villain role of Carlos in his film Indrajaalam (1990), starring Mohanlal. Just like his character Kochuvava, Carlos also became immensely popular so much so that for some years since then Dev was often referred to as Carlos, much like Keerikkadan Jose another popular villain character of that time. The role of Carlos proved to be career-defining for Dev, as he was showered with villain roles in a number of films.

Several of Dev's villain roles had a touch of comedy, but he could not get out of the typical villain character mould. He got a break from this with Aniyan Bava Chetan Bava (1995), directed by Rajasenan, in which he played Aniyan Bava, the younger brother to Chettan Bava, played by Narendra Prasad. The film established his versatility. He went on to act in full-fledged comedy roles after it, most notably in the films Sphadikam (1995), Thommanum Makkalum (2005) and Chota Mumbai (2007). He still continued to act his signature villain roles. He expanded his career to Tamil, Telugu and Kannada films starting with Gentleman (1993), directed by S. Shankar. He acted in over 50 films in those languages, most of which were villain roles. Out of about 800 films he acted in, many of the roles he played were of corrupt police officer, minister, etc., another testimonial to the several typecast roles he had to act in. Dev has directed three films: Achammakuttiyude Achayan (1998), Maniyarakkallan and Achante Kochumolku (2003). He was planned to direct two more films titled Kayal Rajavu and Simham, starring Mammootty and Prithviraj, respectively.

== Illness and death ==
Rajan P. Dev suffered from various disease like diabetes and liver cirrhosis during his final years. He was admitted to hospital many times due to these problems. He also lost his sight due to diabetes, and suffered without seeing camera during many shootings. On 26 July 2009, he vomited high amounts of blood at his home in Angamaly, and was admitted to Little Flower Hospital near his home. Later, he was shifted to Lake Shore Hospital in Kochi for advanced treatment, where he died on 29 July, aged 58. The last film that he had acted in was Ringtone, directed by Ajmal.

== Filmography ==
=== As an actor ===
==== Malayalam ====
===== 1980s =====
Year	Title	Role	Notes
1981	Sanchari	Chekuthaan Varghese	
1981	Sphodanam		
1983	Ente Mamattukkuttiyammakku	Adv. Thomas George	
1984	My Dear Kuttichathan	School Teacher	
1985	Akalathe Ambili		
1985	Makan Ente Makan		
1986	Shyama	Dance Master	Cameo
1986	Pappan Priyappetta Pappan	Puli Sankaran	
1988	Samvalsarangal		
1989	Swantham Ennu Karuthi		

===== 1990s =====
Year	Title	Role	Notes
1990	Indrajaalam	Carlos	
1990	Vyooham	Jayakumar	
1990	Ee Kanni Koodi	Pillai	
1990	Appu	Varma	
1990	Oliyampukal	Nanu Mooppan	
1991	Kadinjool Kalyanam	Thalaivar Vellai Chami	
1991	Ezhunnallathu	Ranger Uncle	
1991	Chakravarthy	Patrick Perreira	
1991	Thudar Katha	Receiver Shivasankaran	
1991	Amina Tailors	Moori Hydrose	
1991	Mookilla Rajyathu	Abdullah	
1991	Kuttapathram	Augustine Fernandez	
1992	Apaaratha	Theeppori Madhavan	
1992	Maanyanmar	Vikaraman	
1992	Kaazhchakkppuram	Thomas Mathew	
1992	Aardram	Mathai	
1992	Kizhakkan Pathrose	Chandi Muthalaali	
1992	First Bell	Vakkachan	
1992	Ente Ponnu Thampuran	S.I. Idikulla	
1993	Sthalathe Pradhana Payyans	Sadanandan	
1993	Pravachakan	Menon	
1993	Mafia	Moosakutty	
1993	Janam	Dasappan	
1993	Injakkadan Mathai & Sons	David	
1993	Ekalavyan	Home Minister Velayudhan	
1993	Aayirappara	Govinda Menon	
1993	Paalayam	Member Kuttapayi	
1994	Commissioner	IG Rajan Felix IPS	
1994	Chukkan	Anandakrishna Iyyer	
1994	Puthran	Easho	
1994	Gandeevam	Karunakaran Nair	
1994	Kadal	Musthafa Haji	
1994	Rudraksham	Nair	
1994	Kambolam	Tharakkandam Thommichan	
1994	Njan Kodiswaran	Mathachen	
1994	Manathe Kottaram	Lukochen Pettah	
1994	Kudumba Vishesham	KRC	
1994	Cabinet	Varghesekutty	
1995	Tom & Jerry	Krishnadas	
1995	Three Men Army	Thomas	
1995	Ezharakoottam	Vakkachan	
1995	Spadikam	Manimala Vakkachan	
1995	Puthukkottayile Puthumanavalan	Govindan	
1995	Mazhavilkoodaram	Ram Saab	
1995	Maanthrikam	Antonio	
1995	Kokkarakko		
1995	Mimics Action 500	Manimala Mamachan	
1995	Kidilol Kidilam	Eappan George	
1995	Karma		
1995	Kalamasseriyil Kalyanayogam	Edappally Raman Nair	
1995	Aniyan Bava Chetan Bava	Kunjan Bava (Aniyan Bava)	
1995	Agrajan	Ittikuru/Kunjupalu	
1995	Oru Abhibhashakante Case Diary	SP Sugunapal	
1995	Thirumanassu	Divan Thampi	
1995	Peterscott	Doctor	
1995	Special Squad	Fernandez	
1995	The King	Govindan Menon	
1995	Alancheri Thamprakkal	Capt. Mukundan Menon/George Varghese	
1995	Saamoohyapaadam	Kunjanandan Nair	
1996	Patanayakan	Maliyekkal Marthandan	
1996	Pallivathukkal Thommichan	Thommichan	
1996	Yuvathurki	Somedraji/Gunashekharan	
1996	Dominic Presentation	Marthandan Pillai	
1996	Mr. Clean	Madhavan Thampi	
1996	Sathyabhamakkoru Premalekhanam	Kovai Machan	
1996	Mookkilla Rajyathu Murimookkan Rajavu		
1996	Malayaalamaasam Chingam Onninu		
1996	Kinnam Katta Kallan	Doctor Raghav	
1996	Kavadam		
1997	Azhakiya Ravanan	Chathothu Panicker	
1997	Newspaper Boy	Dada	
1997	Manthra Mothiram	Achuthan	
1997	Kottappurathe Koottukudumbam	Bhaskara Menon	
1997	Kalyana Unnikal	Muthu Nayakam	
1997	Junior Mandrake	Nambiar	
1997	Janathipathyam	DGP Padmanabhan Pillai IPS	
1997	Ekkareyanente Manasam	Adv. Sreedharan	
1997	Asuravamsam	Moosa Settu	
1997	Masmaram	Willson Moriz	
1997	Bhoopathi	Williams	
1997	Aattuvela		
1997	Varnapakittu	Pullankunnel Pappan	
1998	Kottaram Veettile Apputtan	Kozhikkaden Achuthan Nambiar	
1998	Kalaapam	Vaniyamkulam Vishwam	
1998	Vismayam	Thumbaseery Kuruppu	
1998	Kallu Kondoru Pennu	Sreekandan	
1998	Grama Panchayath	Pappu	
1998	Dravidan		
1998	Achaammakkuttiyude Achaayan	Kattungal Anthony	also director (debut)
1998	Aalibabayum Aarara Kallanmarum	Chathanadan	
1999	Swastham Grihabharanam	Veerabhadran Nair	
1999	Panchapandavar	Parameswara Kurup	
1999	Jananayakan	Doraiswami	
1999	Independence	Mukundan	
1999	Ezhupunna Tharakan	Kumbanadan Lazar	
1999	Deepasthambham Mahascharyam	Nambiar	
1999	Crime File	Mammala Mammachen	
1999	Parasala Pachan Payyannoor Paramu	K.N. Pisharadi	
1999	Aayiram Meni	Bhaskaran	
1999	Aakasha Ganga	Meppadan Thirumeni	

===== 2000s =====
Year	Title	Role	Notes
2000	Sathyameva Jayathe	SSP Thomas Pattimattom IPS	
2000	Dada Sahib	Skaraia Zachariah	
2000	The Warrant	Navajeevan Madhavji	
2000	Mera Naam Joker	Ittoop	
2000	Rapid Action Force	Koshy Nainan	
2000	Cover Story		
2001	Vakkalathu Narayanankutty	DGP Kurian Kulapurayil IPS	
2001	Rakshasa Rajavu	Minister Attuva Avarachan	
2001	Nakshathragal Parayathirunnathu	Rajashekharan	
2001	Kakkinakshathram	Anamuttathu Hajiyar	
2001	Nagaravadhu	Mamaji	
2001	Ee Nadu Innale Vare	Chief Minister	
2001	Karumadikkuttan	Neelakantan Muthalali	
2001	Sharja To Sharja	Karunan Kappithan	
2001	Nariman	Adv. Vaikuntam	
2002	Videsi Nair Swadesi Nair	Rajappan Nair	
2002	Swarna Medal	Balakrishanan	
2002	Akhila	Sekharan Nair	
2002	Njan Rajavu		
2002	Shivam	S.I. Eapen	
2002	Oomappenninu Uriyadappayyan	C.I. Chellappa Chettiar	
2002	Kaiyethum Doorath	Prof. Sadasivan	
2002	Jagathy Jagadeesh in Town	Minister Vishwanathan	
2003	Leader	Kaimal	
2003	Swantham Malavika		
2003	Achante Kochumolku	Gabriel Panachikkadan	
2004	Kusruthi	Thathran	
2004	Vamanapuram Bus Route	Ouseppu	
2004	Sethurama Iyer CBI	Registar Bahuleyan	
2004	C. I. Mahadevan 5 Adi 4 Inchu	Nambiar	
2004	Vellinakshatram	Meppadan Thirumeni	
2004	Vajram	Fr. Varghese	
2004	Thekkekkara Superfast	Philippose Pookkattuparambil	
2004	Aparichithan	Police Officer	
2004	Natturajavu	Captain Menon	
2005	Isra		
2005	Thommanum Makkalum	Thomman	As Title Role
2005	Udayon	Chetti	
2005	Kalyana Kurimanam	Aravindaksha Kuruppu	
2005	Thaskara Veeran	Arakkalam Kuttappan	
2005	Pandippada	Kuruppu / Karuppayya Swami	
2005	Bharathchandran I.P.S.	DySP Pookkoya	
2005	Chanthupottu	Thorayil Aasan	
2005	The Tiger	Varkeychan Narimattathil	
2006	Vargam	Priest	
2006	Pothan Vava	Vakkachan	
2006	Highway Police	David D'Souza	
2006	Oruvan		
2007	Ravanan	I.G. Raman Menon	
2007	Panthaya Kozhi	Astrologer	
2007	Nagaram	Lonappan	
2007	Sketch	Chandrasekhara Shetty	
2007	Chotta Mumbai	Pambu Chackochan	
2007	Abraham & Lincoln	Rahim Rawuthar	
2007	Athisayan	Minister Divakaran	
2007	Nadiya Kollappetta Rathri	Retired SI Mayilvahanam Kathireshan	
2007	Ali Bhai	Karunakaran Thampi	
2007	Black Cat	Tharakan Muthalali	
2007	Kichamani MBA	DIG Somashekaran IPS	
2007	Indrajith	'Chemparunthu' Bhaskaran	
2007	Chocolate	Bahuleyan	
2008	Roudram	IG Mohammed Shihabudeen IPS	
2008	Mayabazar	Akri Damodharan	
2008	Annan Thampi	Dharmarajan	
2008	Kanichukulangarayil CBI	Krishna Gopan	
2008	Lollipop	Chandykunju	
2008	Sound of Boot	Retd IGP Raghavan Nambiar IPS	
2008	Gopalapuranam	Gopalan Nair	
2008	De Ingottu Nokkiye		
2008	Shakespeare M.A. Malayalam	Veerabhasan	
2008	Aayudham	Plavinchottil Chacko	
2008	Bullet	Ganga Prasad	
2009	Love In Singapore	Irumbu Mani	
2009	Hailesa	Maniyappan's father	
2009	I. G. – Inspector General	Chief Minister Ramachandran	
2009	Ee Pattanathil Bhootham	Kora	
2009	Daddy Cool	Roy's father	
2009	Sambhu	Puthukodi Balan	

===== 2010s =====
Year	Title	Role	Notes
2010	Black Stallion	Sebastian Zacharia	
2010	Brahmasthram	Ramachandran	
2010	Vandae Maatharam	Dy. SP Mansoor	
2010	Ringtone	Rajasingam Thampuran	
2013	Rhythm		

===== 2020s =====
Year	Title	Role	Notes
2021	The Priest	Joseph Alatt	Photo presence
2021	Kaaval	Kuzhiyil Chandy	Photo presence

==== Tamil ====
Year	Title	Role	Notes
1991	Vasanthakala Paravai	Inspector	
1992	Naangal	Rathnaswamy	
1992	Suriyan	Koopu Konar	
1993	Gentleman	Chief Minister	
1994	Pathavi Pramanam	R. K. (Rajakumar)	
1996	Sengottai	Thirumoorthy	
1996	Selva	Vaappa	
1997	Vaimaye Vellum	Perumal	
1997	Love Today	Inspector Vasudevan	
1997	Periya Idathu Mappillai	Chinna Thambi	
1998	Golmaal	Karnal Rajappa	
1998	En Uyir Nee Thaane	Rajasekhar	
1999	Poomagal Oorvalam	Sengodan	
1999	Aasaiyil Oru Kaditham	Anand's father	
2000	Kushi	MP Ambareesh	
2000	Simmasanam	Thambidurai	
2000	Maayi	MLA Sundarapandiyan	
2001	Thaalikaatha Kaaliamman	Raghavan	
2002	Red	Sarathy	
2002	Bala	Pasupathi	
2002	Sri Bannari Amman	Vellangiri	
2003	Nadhi Karaiyinile	Mohammed Khan	
2004	Jai	Vajravelu	
2004	Campus	Sathyaseelan	
2004	Jana	Minister	
2004	Arasatchi	Contractor Muthupandi	
2005	Sukran	Judge Needhi Manikkam	
2005	Manthiran	Local Gangster	
2006	Aathi	Pattabhi	
2006	Kalinga	Chanakya	
2007	Manase Mounama	Aadhi	
2008	Vambu Sandai	Malayali Doctor	
2008	Tharagu	Encounter Specialist	
2008	Thenavattu	Minister	
2009	Karthik Anitha	Krishnamoorthy	
2009	Malayan	M. R. K. Vedachalam	

==== Telugu ====
Year	Title	Role	Notes
2001	Khushi	Gudumba Satti	
2002	Aadi	Nagi Reddy	
2003	Naaga	Home Minister	
2003	Aayudham	Varadaraju	
2003	Dil	Nandini's grandfather	
2003	Okkadu	Siva Reddy	
2003	Simhadri	Kerala Chief Minister	Cameo
2003	Seetayya	Sivayya's father	
2003	Praanam		Special Appearance
2004	Koduku	Basava Punnayya	
2004	Arya	MP Avataram	
2004	Arjun	Govindarajulu	
2004	Gudumba Shankar	Kumaraswamy's Uncle	
2005	Balu		
2005	Bunny	Chief Minister Gudumba Chatti	
2005	Veerabhadra	Zamindar	
2007	Yogi		
2007	Vijayadasami	Kodanti Koteshwar Rao	
2008	Kalidasu	Home Minister	

==== Kannada ====
Year	Title	Role	Notes
2003	Don	Sadhu Shetty	
2003	Annavru		
2006	Student		
2008	Nee Tata Naa Birla		
2009	Maccha	JK	

=== As director ===
1. Achamakuttiyude Achayan (1998)
2. Achante Kochumol (2003)
3. Maniyarakallan (2005)

== Serials ==
- Samayam (Asianet)
- Ashtapadi (Surya TV)
- Kadamattathu Kathanaar (Asianet)
- Sanmanassulavarkku Samadhanam (Asianet)
- Swami Ayappan (Asianet)
- 123 Sat (Asianet)
- Kaala (Kairali TV)
