= Oru Kadankatha Pole =

Oru Kadamkatha Pole
- Directed by: Joshy Mathew
- Written by: Nedumudi Venu
- Screenplay by: John Paul
- Produced by: Balan, Satheesh, Achahci for BAM Productions
- Starring: Nedumudi Venu, Geetha; Jayaram; Ashokan; Idavela Babu; Oduvil; Innocent; Mathu; Kaviyoor Ponnamma; Usharani, etc.
- Cinematography: Venu
- Edited by: B. Lenin; V. T. Vijayan
- Music by: Mohan Sithara
- Production company: BAM Productions
- Distributed by: BAM Productions
- Release date: 10 August 1993
- Country: India
- Language: Malayalam

Oru Kadamkatha Pole is a 1993 Indian Malayalam-language film, directed by Joshy Mathew and produced by Achachi, Balan and Mathew Thomas. The film stars Jayaram, Geetha, Nedumudi Venu and Ashokan in the lead roles. The musical score of the film is performed by Mohan Sithara.

== Plot ==
Shankara Warrier (played my Nedumudi Venu) always comes home for his father's death anniversary, but is not yet here. Everyone is worried and the movie is mostly flashback explaining the reason. Sankara Warrier is a 45 year old man who didn't get married as he was busy taking care of his two sisters and a brother. The family still depends on him, for example, one sister's husband spends all his salary on his union and is always in legal troubles.

He stays in the town with three room mates - Kaimal (Oduvil Unnikrishnan), Unni (Idavela Babu), and Balagopalan (Ashokan). Later, Venugopal (Jayaram) and Sandhya (Maathu), move to the neighbouring house. Sandhya is a member of a royal family and her family was extremely upset by her marrying Venugopal. Sankara Warrier mediates their conflict and the relationship between Venugopal and Sankara Warrier develop quickly.

Venugopal, Kaimal, Unni, and Balagopalan encourage Sankara Warrier to get married. At the same time, Sankara Warrier meets Radha (Geetha) when he goes to inspect a bank. Radha had broken a rule to help her customer and she defends it very well. This really impresses Sankara Warrier and she later tells Jayaram that his idea wife is a woman "who has feminine grace, but has her own personality - should have a stance of her own and should be able to defend it". He helps Radha rent a house and arranges his childhood nanny to stay with her. Encouraged by Venugopal, he tells Radha that his mother had promised that if he recovers from typhoid, they will do a Thulabharam at Guruvayoor. Radha, an avid temple goer, says that she will come with him and help him fulfil this promise. While they are at Guruvayoor, Sankara Warrier dreams of marrying Radha and leading a happy life with her. While still in this haze, he wakes up and walks to the adjacent room where Radha is staying. The door was unlocked and she was standing there turned away from the door. He goes forward and places a hand on Radha's shoulder. Radha, who had a bad experience earlier is extremely taken aback and asks him to leave the room immediately.

Later it is revealed that Radha is Venugopal's sister. Venugopal who encouraged Sankara Warrier's attempts so far takes a 180 degree turn and shouts at his sister and admonished her for bad character. Radha tells Venugopal that she is completely innocent and she had no such intention. She herself was taken aback when he behaved in this fashion. Venugopal blasts Shankara Warrier for such unacceptable behaviour. Earlier Sankara Warrier's family had heard about his relationship from his nanny, and his mother and sister too had admonished him. Having lost his face in-front of his family, friends, and lover, Sankara Warrier vanishes the next morning.

The manager of the Bank where Radha is working, is a friend of Sankara Warrier. When he hears the incident between Radha and Sankara Warrier, he reveals that he is staying in an Ayurvedic hospital. Radha goes there and brings him in time for his father's anniversary rites. And they live happily ever after.

== Cast ==
- Nedumudi Venu as Shekhara Warrior
- Jayaram as Venugopal
- Geetha as Radha, Venugopal's elder sister
- Maathu as Sandhya, Venugopal's wife
- Ashokan as Balagopalan
- Adoor Bhavani as Naniyamma
- Kaviyoor Ponnamma as Shekhara Warrior's mother
- Innocent as Pillai, Marriage Brockar
- Idavela Babu as Unni
- Oduvil Unnikrishnan as Kaimal
- T.P Madhavan as Anantha Krishnan, Bank Manager
- Usharani as Alamelu, Anantha Krishnan 's wife
- Bindu Panikker as Sarala
- Jagannatha Varma as Sandhya's father
- Thodupuzha Vasanthi as Chinnu, servant

== Soundtrack ==
The music was composed by Mohan Sithara.

No.	Song	Singers	Lyrics	Length (m:ss)
1	"Ponnum Pooppada"	K. J. Yesudas, K. S. Chithra	O. N. V. Kurup	
2	"Sopaanasangeethalahariyil"	K. J. Yesudas	O. N. V. Kurup	
