= Dominic Presentation (film) =

- Directed by: Ramesh Das
- Starring: Ashokan; Geetha; Vijayakumar; Indrans
- Music by: Vidyadharan
- Production company: Kongassery Films
- Distributed by: Kongassery Films
- Release date: 25 September 1996
- Country: India
- Language: Malayalam

Dominic Presentation is a 1996 Indian Malayalam film, directed by Ramesh Das. The film stars Ashokan, Geetha, Vijayakumar and Indrans in the lead roles. The film has musical score by Vidyadharan.

== Cast ==
- Ashokan as James
- Geetha as Indu Varma IPS
- Vijayakumar as Dominic Presentation
- Indrans as Velayudan
- Rajan P. Dev as Marthandan Pilla
- Shaju as Gopalakrishnan
- Kalabhavan Navas
- Thalapathy Dinesh as Kumareshan
- Sathaar as Satheesh Chandran
- Bheeman Raghu as Amareshan
- Mala Aravindan as Father Joseph Medayil
- Azeez as D.I.G
- Gomathi as Gomathi
- Remadevi as Alice

== Soundtrack ==
The music was composed by Vidyadharan and the lyrics were written by Kaithapram.

| No. | Song | Singers | Lyrics | Length (m:ss) |
|---|---|---|---|---|
| 1 | "Idaya Kanyaka Njan" | K. S. Chithra | Kaithapram | |
| 2 | "Idayakanyakayo Neeyen" | Natesh Shankar | Kaithapram | |
| 3 | "Njanoru Madakara Youvanam" | Swarnalatha | Kaithapram | |
