= Shyam Mukherjee (filmmaker) =

Indian film editor

- Occupation: Film editor

Shyam Mukherjee is a film editor from India. He is a brother of writer, director, producer Ram Mukherjee, and a nephew of producer Sashadhar Mukherjee, part of the Mukherjee-Samarth family.

== Filmography ==
Shyam Mukherjee edited the following films:

- Beti No. 1 (2000)
- Zulm-O-Sitam (1998)
- Sher-E-Hindustan (1997)
- Muqadar (1996)
- Daanveer (1996)
- Tahqiqaat (1993)
- Zakhmi Sipahi (1992)
- Ganga Tere Desh Mein (1988)
- Surakksha (1979)
