= Yuvajanotsavam =

- Directed by: Sreekumaran Thampi
- Written by: Sreekumaran Thampi
- Produced by: Sreekumaran Thampi
- Starring: Mohanlal; Suresh Gopi; Urvashi; Menaka; Ashokan
- Cinematography: C. Ramachandra Menon
- Edited by: G. Venkittaraman
- Music by: Raveendran
- Production company: Souparnika Movie Arts
- Distributed by: Souparnika Movie Arts
- Release date: 1 August 1986 (Kerala)
- Country: India
- Language: Malayalam

Yuvajanotsavam is a 1986 Indian Malayalam romantic comedy film written, directed, and produced by Shrikumaran Thampi. It stars Mohanlal, Urvashi, Menaka and Ashokan. The music and background by Raveendran. The film marks the return of Suresh Gopi, who started his career as a child artist in Odayil Ninnu (1965). The film was a box office success.

== Plot ==
A shady middle aged man introducing himself as Daddy befriends with a group of college students and start sharing a bachelor lodge.

== Cast ==
- Mohanlal as Jayan
- Suresh Gopi as Dileep
- Ashokan as Jacob Zakharia
- Urvashi as Sindhu
- Menaka as Nirmala
- Maniyanpilla Raju as Bhagaval Das
- K. B. Ganesh Kumar as Rajeevan
- Krishnachandran as Omanakuttan
- Santhosh as Nissar
- Sukumari as Nirmala's Mother
- Innocent as Kunjunni Nair
- Janardhanan as Unnithan
- KPAC Lalitha as MLA Arundhathi
- Jagannatha Varma as SP Balachandran IPS
- Kamal Roy as Unni
- Prathapachandran as Sakhavu P. K.
- Kollam Ajith as Das
- Mohan Jose as Pramod
- Kollam Thulasi as SI Stephen
- Lalithasree
- Poojappura Radhakrishnan as Vattavila Ramanan
- Poojappura Ravi as Ajayan
- Lathika
- Nandu as Prince
- Suresh Bheemsingh as Shiva Chidambaram
- Kalaranjini as Bhagaval Das's wife (Guest appearance)

== Soundtrack ==
All lyrics are written by Sreekumaran Thampi except where noted; all music is composed by Raveendran.

Track listing
No.	Title	Lyrics	Artist(s)	Length
1.	"Aa Mukham Kanda Naal"		S. Janaki, Satheesh Babu
2.	"Ambalamukku Kazhinjal"		C. O. Anto, Jolly Abraham, Krishnachandran
3.	"Innumente Kannuneeril"		K. J. Yesudas,	4.09
4.	"Paadaam Namukku Paadaam"		K. J. Yesudas, S. P. Sailaja	5.19
5.	"Pralayapayodhi"	Jayadeva	Krishnachandran
