= Patham Nilayile Theevandi =

- Directed by: Joshy Mathew
- Written by: Dennis Joseph
- Produced by: Jose Thomas
- Starring: Innocent; Jayasurya; Meera Nandan
- Cinematography: Vinod Illampally
- Edited by: Beena Paul
- Music by: Mattannoor Sankarankutty
- Distributed by: Kalasangham Films
- Release date: 13 November 2009
- Country: India
- Language: Malayalam

Patham Nilayile Theevandi (transl. Train in the Tenth Floor) is a 2009 Indian Malayalam-language film directed by Joshy Mathew. It stars Innocent, Jayasurya, and Meera Nandan in pivotal roles. Chenda artist Mattannoor Sankarankutty composed music for the film.

== Plot ==
The film tells the story of Sankara Narayanan, a 55-year-old gangman from the Indian Railways. Since his teenage days, he was afraid of the strange voices that talked to him incessantly. To escape the fear, he seeks refuge in alcohol, alienating himself from his family and ending up in an asylum. Narayanan's son, Ramu, doesn't sympathise with him for shirking his responsibility as a husband and a father. Narayanan starts writing letters from the asylum, to which Ramu doesn't even bother to reply. A young doctor tries to help Sankara Narayanan as he knows that he can be cured. The doctor not only intends to reunite Narayanan with his family but also has something very important to reveal to Ramu.

== Cast ==
- Innocent as Sankara Narayanan
- Jayasurya as S. Ramanadhan (Ramu)
- Anoop Menon as Dr. John Mathai
- Meera Nandan as Indu
- Vijayaraghavan as Ayyappan
- Sreekala as Sarojini
- Jagannathan as Sankaran's uncle
- Balachandran Chullikkad as Board member

== Awards ==
- Kerala Film Critics 2008 – Best Actor – Innocent
