= Hemanth Ravan =

Indian actor

Hemanth or Hemanth G Nag is an Indian writer, business person, actor who has appeared in Malayalam films, including Raasaiyya (1995), Sher-E-Hindustan and Sathyameva Jayathe (2001).

He has written many articles on empowerment of women and the current situation of our education system.

He presently runs St Michel's English School at Byatarayanapura.

== Filmography ==
Year	Title	Role	Language	Notes
1995	Maanthrikam	Father Nelson/Gonzalves	Malayalam	
1995	Raasaiyya	Groom	Tamil	
1996	Naalamkettile Nalla Thampimar	Ikram Muhammad	Malayalam	
1996	King Soloman	Peter Rozario	Malayalam	
1996	Sengottai		Tamil	
1997	Masmaram	Hemanth	Malayalam	
1997	Bhoopathi	Christy	Malayalam	
1997	Vaimaye Vellum	Sivaram	Tamil	
1997	Gangothri	Mirza Kasim	Malayalam	
1998	Ulavuthurai	Terrorist	Tamil	
1998	Harikrishnans	Dr. Jaya Kumar	Malayalam	
1998	Sher-E-Hindustan	PC Kishan	Hindi	
1999	Malabar Police	Police Officer	Tamil	
1999	Samarasimha Reddy	Veera Rajendra Reddy	Telugu	
1999	Shera	Vishal	Hindi	
2000	Daivathinte Makan	Rathan Bhai	Malayalam	
2000	Unnimaya		Malayalam	
2000	Fashion Girls		Malayalam	
2000	The Gang	Robert	Malayalam	
2000	Appu	Corrupted Mumbai Police Officer	Tamil	
2000	India Gate	Pollachi Thevar	Malayalam	
2000	Rhythm	Chitra's Neighbour	Tamil	
2001	Sathyameva Jayathe	Musharuf Ibrahim / Bharath Shah	Malayalam	
2001	Alli Thandha Vaanam	Sharma	Tamil	
2001	Onnaman	C.I Martin	Malayalam	
2001	Narasimha Naidu		Telugu	
2003	Palnati Brahmanayudu		Telugu	
2003	Simhachalam	Seetharama Raju	Telugu	
2003	War and Love	Colonel Muhammed	Malayalam	
2004	Samba		Telugu	
2007	Manikanda		Tamil	
