= Madaalasa =

1978 Indian film directed by J. Williams

- Poster
- Directed by: J. Williams
- Written by: J. Williams; Paul Vengola (dialogues)
- Screenplay by: J. Williams
- Produced by: Paul Vengola
- Starring: Y. Vijaya; Thikkurissy Sukumaran Nair; Sreelatha Namboothiri; Prathapachandran; Sukumaran; Mohan
- Cinematography: J. Williams
- Edited by: Sasikumar
- Music by: K. J. Joy
- Production company: RW Combines
- Release date: 24 November 1978
- Country: India
- Language: Malayalam

Madaalasa is a 1978 Indian Malayalam-language film, directed by J. Williams and produced by Paul Vengola. The film stars Thikkurissy Sukumaran Nair, Sreelatha Namboothiri, Prathapachandran, Sukumaran and Mohan. The film has musical score by K. J. Joy.

== Plot ==
Pattalam Vasu is a lorry driver and a former service man, a drunkard, but with good principles. He is the guardian to Jaanu, his love interest, and to her sister Sumathi. Vasu loves her and wished to marry, but his conversations are always bitter, cruel and doubtful of her fidelity.

Chandru who is studying in city come to his home town for vacation. Jaanu working as a house maid at Chandru's home for her earnings. Chandru is a teen aged youth who is struggling due to his age and got disturbed many times with the good looking Jaanu and her beauty. His lust on her is blaming day by day and make him restless.

Meanwhile, Jaanu's younger sister Sumathi met with an accident and lost her eyesights. Jaanu has to depend on Chandru's mother, Kochamma for her sister's treatment. Jaanu has to make a big sum of money for her sister's operation. When Kochamma refused for the big sum of money, she has to make the money in an illegal way. She realizes that Chandru has lust on her. She plans to fulfill his lust and offer him a chance and tells him that she will wait for him at the pond side. When she was getting ready to meet Chandru, Vasu comes and make quarrel with her and go by saying that he will kill her, if he finds that she is illegal.

Vasu comes home in anger after a while and found Jaanu is not in home. But Jaanu who was waiting for Chandru at the Pond side was killed. Based on the witnesses from all neighbors and Vasu's assistant, and on the allegations from all in that village, both Police and Court convicted Vasu as the accused and put him in jail.

There is a comedy track handled by director is moving in side track.

But the Inspector who is learning this case believes that Vasu is not the killer of Jaanu. Also, he shows mercy on the killed Jaanu and adopts Jaanu's sister Sumathi as his daughter. His investigation starts here and finds the true killer of Jaanu and the reasons behind Jaanu's murder are the rest of the story.

== Cast ==
- Y. Vijaya as Jaanu
- Thikkurissy Sukumaran Nair
- Meena Joseph as Kochamma, Chandru's mother
- Sreelatha Namboothiri as Mercy
- Prathapachandran as Inspector of Police
- Sukumaran as Pattalam Vasu
- Mohan as Chandru
- Jagathy Sreekumar as Nandagopal, Cinema Director

== Soundtrack ==
The music was composed by KJ Joy and the lyrics were written by Yusufali Kechery.

No.	Song	Singers	Lyrics	Length (m:ss)
1	"Amruthozhukum Gaanam"	S. Janaki	Yusufali Kechery	
2	"Anuraaga Naattile"	P. Susheela, P. Jayachandran	Yusufali Kechery	
3	"Madaalase Manohari"	P. Jayachandran	Yusufali Kechery	
4	"Neeyente Jeevanil"	K. J. Yesudas	Yusufali Kechery	
