= Manasariyathe =

- Directed by: Soman Ambaat
- Written by: Velliman Vijayan
- Starring: Mohanlal; Zarina Wahab; Bhagyasri; Nedumudi Venu; Jagathi Sreekumar
- Cinematography: A. Ranganathan
- Edited by: K. Sankunni
- Music by: Raghu Kumar; Pukazhenthi (Score)
- Production company: MK Productions
- Distributed by: Beejees Release
- Release date: 4 March 1984
- Running time: 128 minutes
- Country: India
- Language: Malayalam

Manasariyathe (transl. Without the knowledge of mind) is a 1984 Indian Malayalam-language thriller film directed by Soman Ambaat and written by Velliman Vijayan. It stars Mohanlal, Zarina Wahab and Nedumudi Venu. The film's songs were composed by Raghu Kumar, while the background score was provided by Pukazhenthi.

== Plot ==
A womanizer frequently troubles a happy family. This leads the husband to threaten the guy publicly. The next day the guy turns up in the family house as a corpse. How the family deals with the corpse and who was responsible for the death is the rest of the movie.

== Cast ==
- Mohanlal as Mammootty
- Nedumudi Venu as Venu
- Zarina Wahab as Sindhu
- Bhagyasri
- Jagathi Sreekumar as Ambilykuttan
- Sankaradi as Sankaran
- Meena as Minimol
- Philomina
- Sathar as Mohan

== Soundtrack ==
The music was composed by Raghu Kumar and the lyrics were written by Poovachal Khader.

No.	Song	Singers	Lyrics	Length
1	"Khalbil Nirayunna"	P. Madhuri, Satheesh Babu	Poovachal Khader	5:13
2	"Poomadam Pooshunna Kaattil"	P. Susheela, Satheesh Babu	Poovachal Khader	4:05
