= Vettikulangara Devi Temple Cheppad =

Hindu temple in Kerala, India

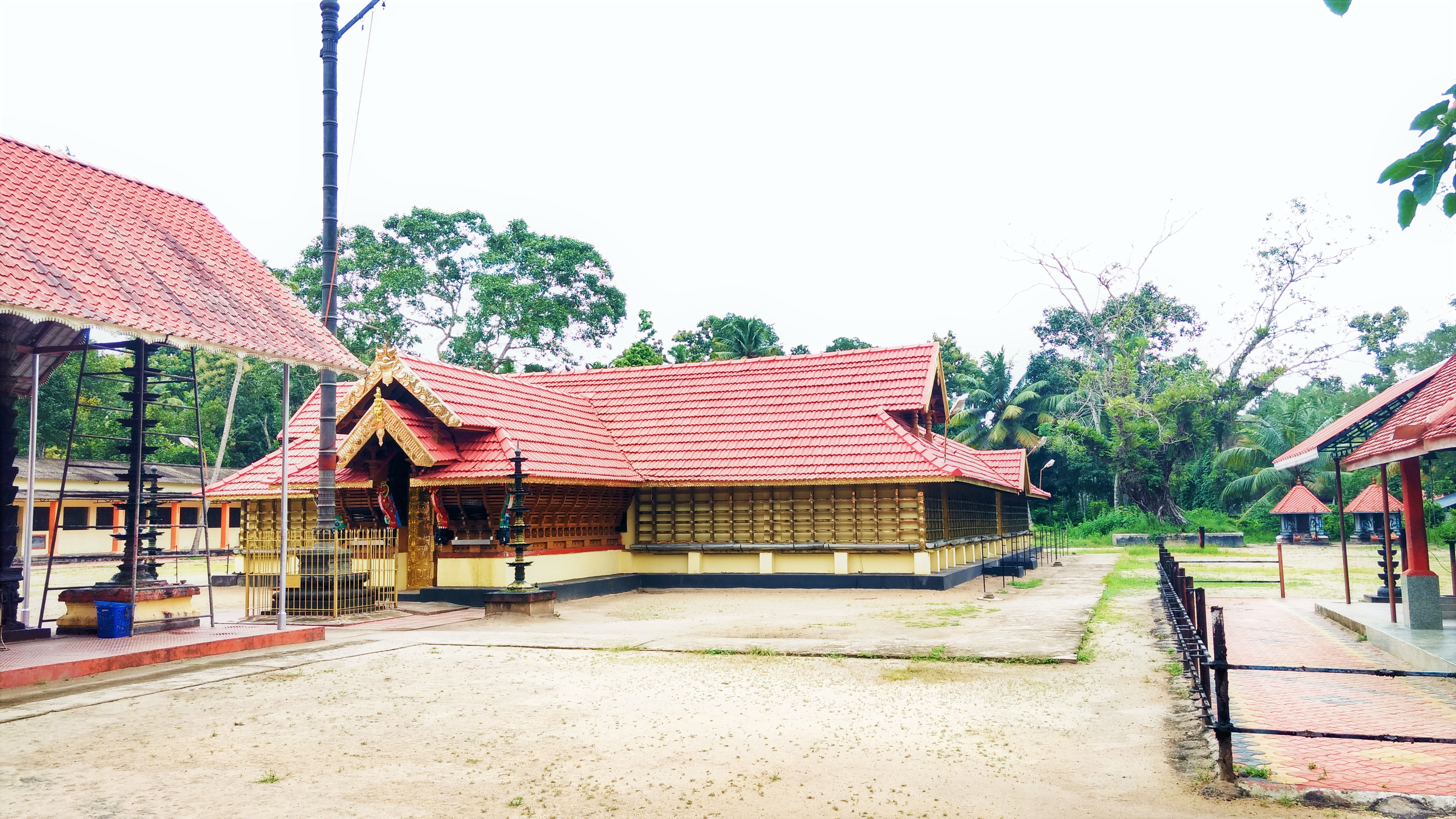

- Vettikulangara Devi Temple, Cheppad, Haripad, Alappuzha, Kerala

Religion
- Affiliation: Hinduism
- District: Alappuzha
- Deity: Durga (Karthiyayini Devi)
- Festivals: Thrikarthika Maholsavam (Vrscikam), Thiru Utsavam (Kumbham)
- Governing body: Travancore Devaswom Board

Location
- Location: Cheppad, Haripad
- State: Kerala
- Country: India
- Interactive map of Vettikulangara Devi Temple Cheppad
- Coordinates: 9.238475°N 76.462415°E

Architecture
- Type: Traditional Kerala Style

Specifications
- Temple: One
- Elevation: 28.34 m (93 ft)

Website
- www.vettikulangaratemple.com

Vettikulangara Devi Temple Cheppad near Harippad, Alappuzha, Kerala is one of the oldest temples in Kerala.This temple is dedicated to Durga Devi and the goddess is also known as Karthiyayini Devi.

== History ==
From ancient times, people have worshiped Lord Mahadeva. The arrival of a Brahmin Scholar known as Thampuran from the Pazhore Padippura became responsible for the incarnation of Devi in this area. Thampuran, who had come from the north, took up his residence at Nedunagappally, Ramapuram in the south of this region. Later, on his return to his native place, Thampuran took along with him the idol of Devi, his deity of worship. During his journey, because of the omnipotence of Mahadeva, the idol happened to fall into the pond in the Kannirasi. Despite laborious efforts, Thampuran could not regain the idol. With a heavy heart, Thampuran returned to his native place. After several years while members of the Naluveettil family were digging the pond, they found the idol of Devi in the pond.

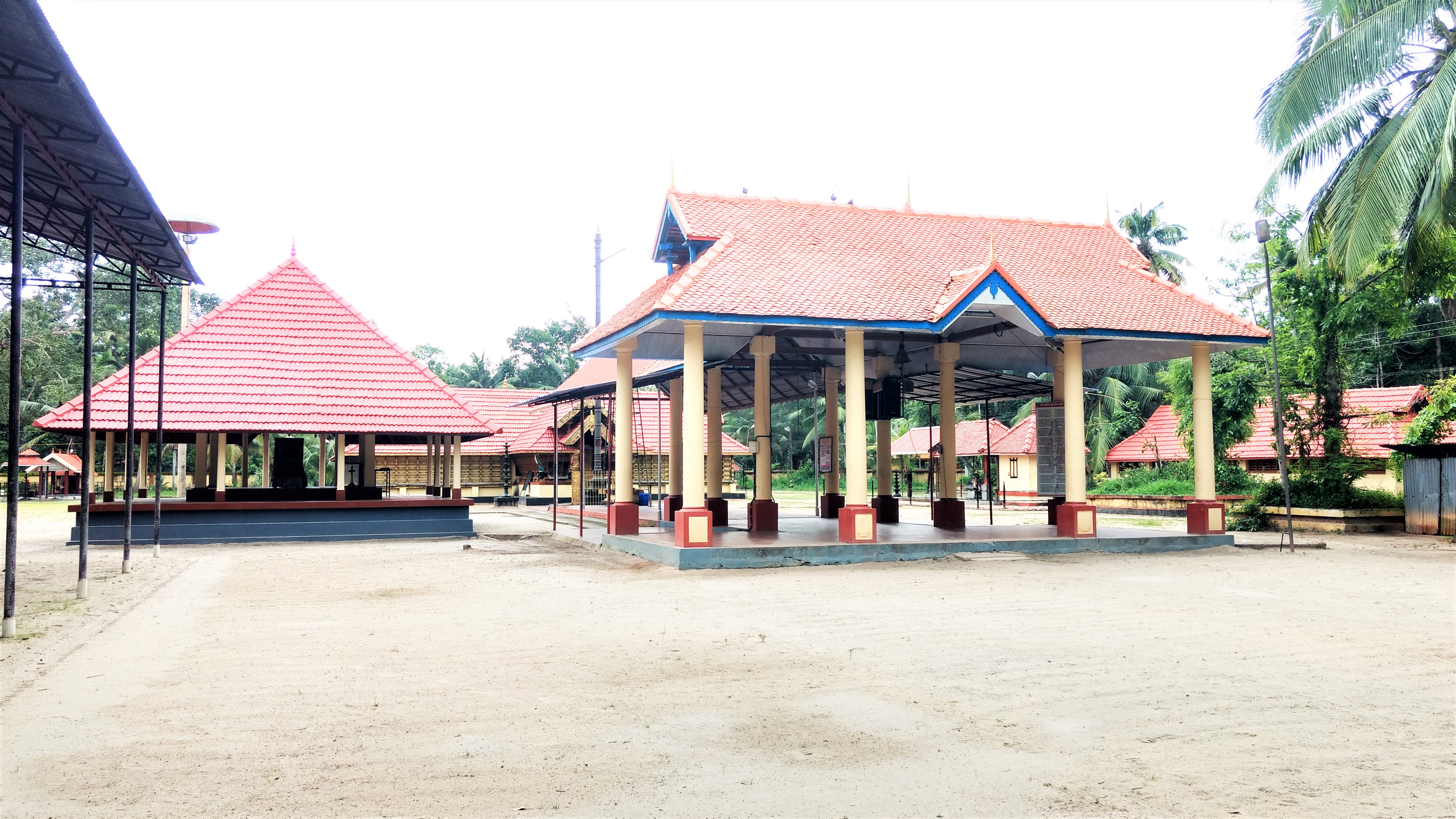
Kalathattu and Anakottil

Having been hit by their digging implements, blood began to ooze from the idol. Realizing the vitality of Devi, people took possession of the idol with devotion and began to worship. As the idol was obtained during the process of digging the pond, the name "Vettikulangara came into vogue. By preserving the purity and antiquity, the pond is being protected even today.

As Adi Parashakti, the mother of mercy and the giver of vitality, Sri Karthyayani Devi resides here. By showering her blessings on her devotees who appeals to her with aching hearts, Devi reins the Vettikulangara Temple.

== Other Deities ==
Beside the main deity there are many other deities which include Lord Mahadeva, Lord Ganesh, Lord Ayyappan, Nagaraja, and Nagayakshi

== Festivals ==
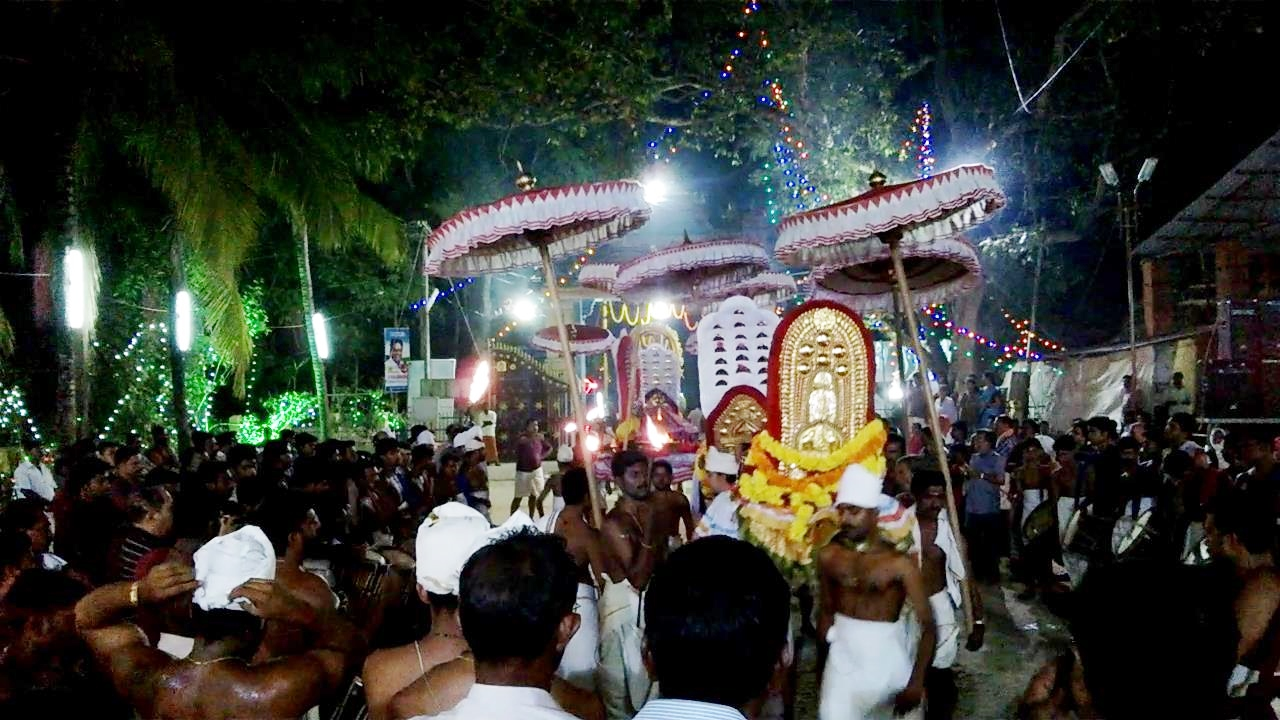
Koottamkottu during Utsav

- Navaham (Kanni)
- Sapthaham (Vrischikam)
- Thrikarthika Maholsavam (Vrischikam)
- Para Ezhunnallathu (Makaram)
- Thiru Utsavam (Kumbham)

== How to reach ==
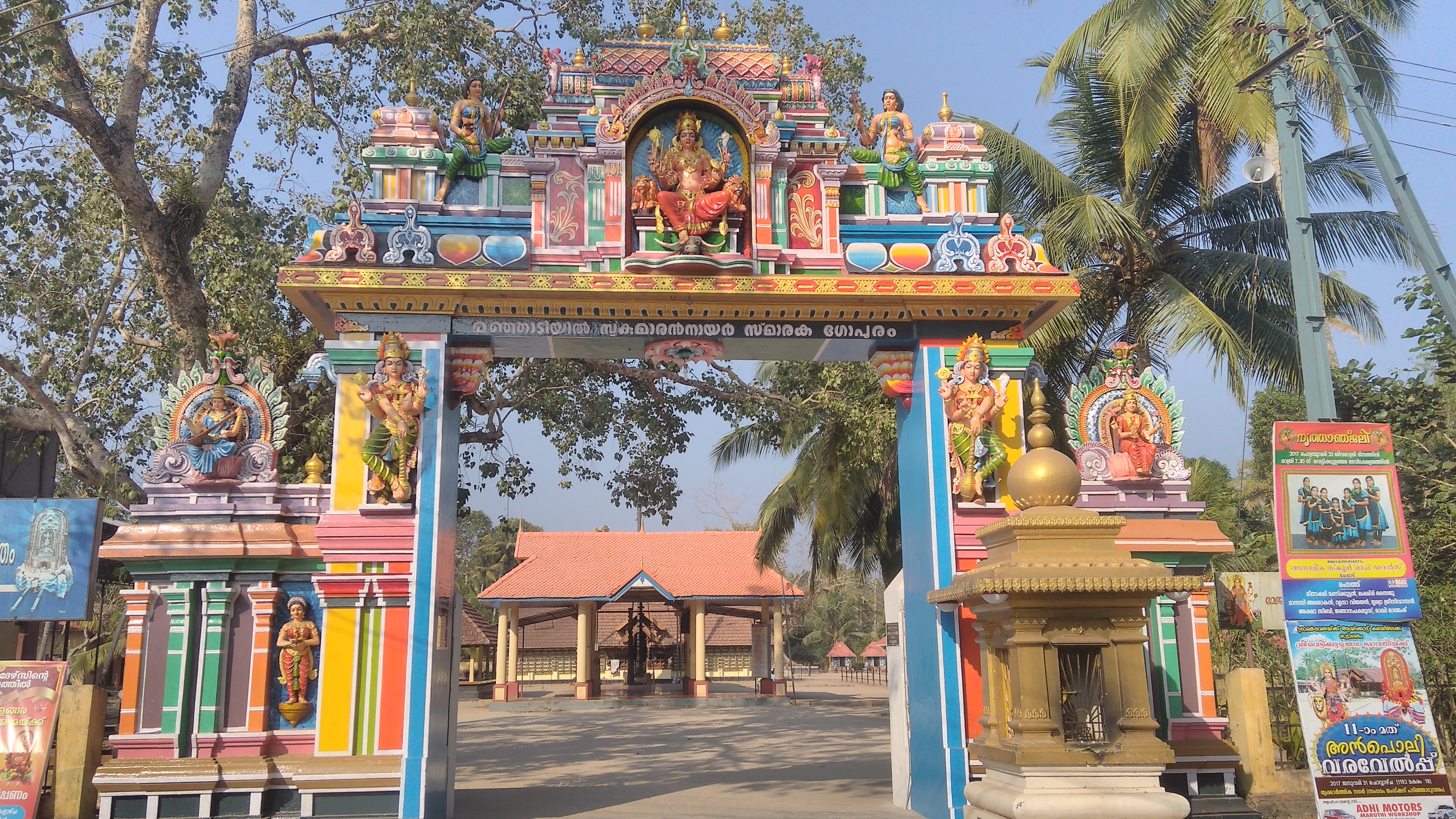
Main entrance to the temple

Nearest bus station : 1 km from Cheppad bus stop, 6 km from Haripad KSRTC bus stand, 12 km from Kayamkulam KSRTC bus stand, 3 km from Nangiarkulangara Bus Stop

Nearest railway station : Cheppad (1.5 km), Haripad (6 km), Kayamkulam (12 km)

Route to Vettikulangara Devi Temple

== See also ==
- Temples of Kerala
- Temple festivals of Kerala
