= Oliyampukal =

- Poster
- Directed by: T. Hariharan
- Screenplay by: Dennis Joseph
- Produced by: K. G. Rajagopal
- Starring: Mammootty; Rekha; Thilakan; Kaviyoor Ponnamma
- Cinematography: Anandakuttan
- Music by: M. S. Viswanathan
- Release date: 31 August 1990
- Country: India
- Language: Malayalam

Oliyampukal (transl. The Hidden Arrows) is a 1990 Indian Malayalam-language political action film, directed by T. Hariharan, written by Dennis Joseph, and produced by K. G. Rajagopal. The film stars Mammootty, Rekha, Thilakan and Kaviyoor Ponnamma. This film did average business and was dubbed into Telugu as Prathinidhi. The film had musical score by M S Viswanathan. It was a film directed by Hariharan without M. T. Vasudevan Nair as scenarist, soon after several films of the duo including the ever successful Oru Vadakkan Veeragadha (1989). This film also marked Aishwarya’s Malayalam debut (the daughter of notable South cinema female star, Lakshmi).

== Plot ==
Thomas, the forest minister, and his party decide to honor their founder member, the late John Mathew in a function and decide to invite his family for the same. They are met by a hostile Baby Mathew, the wayward drunkard son of John Mathew who has turned an alcoholic after the death of his father. His family is in deep debt which was incurred by his father in his attempt to develop his party. He is facing pressure from his sister and brother in law to split the family property to which Baby refuses since they need to marry off their youngest sister Kunjumol. During the function a drunk Baby creates a ruckus at the venue and his brought home by his former lover Usha. At Usha's house, Baby recollects his past when he was an idealistic young environmentalist working against deforestation with Usha at the forest and within the tribal areas. The tribals are terrorized by sandalwood smuggler Devayyan who is hand in glove with Thomas and uses his political power to freely destroy the forest to their needs. As a result of Baby's awareness campaign against Devayyan, the tribals unite under Thankan against Devayyan's gang and stop the cutting of trees. This irks Devayyan who kills one of the tribals. To retaliate against Devayyan, Baby gathers the tribals and sets off to confront him, but are stopped by the police at the behest of then forest minister John Mathew. This leads to a confrontation between father and son where John acknowledges ignoring some illicit activities of the party members for the greater good. He is mocked by Baby and they have an argument. John finally realizes his mistakes and orders a police raid on Devayyan's hideout. However, Devayyan escapes and eventually murders John Mathew with the help of Thomas. John Mathew's driver Nanu Mooppan witnesses the murder but is arrested and jailed on false charges by Thomas.

When Mooppan leaves jail, he approaches Baby and tells him the truth. For vengeance on Thomas and Devayyan and to get rich to support his family, Baby and Nanu Mooppan start smuggling timber and sandalwood to beat Devayyan at his own game and quickly become rich. Kunjumol falls for her college mate and new police officer Thambi and marries him despite initial resistance from Baby. Thomas visits them for the marriage and decides to patch up with Baby and invite him to the party to leverage his wealth for their gain. Baby accepts the offer and swears in as the youth wing leader. They influence Vakakchan, Thomas's right hand with liquor and money to increase Babys strength in the party. They also tip-off Thambi to raid sandalwood smuggling and expose Thomas in the media, eventually forcing him to resign. Thambi raids Devayyan's hideout and captures his gang before Devayyan escapes into the river. When Thambi finds out the true colors of Baby he tries unsuccessfully to arrest him. Thomas receives a call from Devayyan the night before Baby's swearing in ceremony as the new forest minister. Thomas sets out to meet him and finish off baby, but is met by baby himself in Devayyan's hideout. Baby tricks him into coming to the place where he reveals that he has already killed Devayyan the day he evaded the arrest from Thambi and escaped. He then kills Thomas to complete his revenge. Next day during the swearing in ceremony he confesses to his crimes in front of the governor, ministers and media and is arrested by Thambi.

== Cast ==
- Mammootty as Arackal Baby Mathew
- Rekha as Usha
- Thilakan as John Mathew
- Sai Kumar as A.S.P Thampy Mathew
- Aishwarya as Kunjumol Mathew
- Kaviyoor Ponnamma as John Mathew's wife and Baby's mother
- Rajan P Dev as Nanu Mooppan
- Sukumaran as M. Thomas
- Charanraj as Devayyan
- Keerikkadan Jose as Vasu
- Jagathy Sreekumar as P. P. Vakkachan
- Bahadoor as T. P. Chackochan
- Kuthiravattam Pappu as Thankan
- Lalu Alex as Jameskutty, Baby's brother-in-law
- Prathapachandran as Kariyachan
- Sulakshana as Baby's sister

== Music ==
Song	Singers	Lyrics	Music
"Aadi Prakrithi"	M. G. Sreekumar, Sujatha Mohan	O. N. V. Kurup	M. S. Viswanathan
"Vishukkili"	M. G. Sreekumar, P. Susheela	O. N. V. Kurup	M. S. Viswanathan
