= Joshy Mathew =

Indian film director

- Born: Joshy; 8 May; Kottayam, Kerala, India
- Occupation: Film director
- Years active: 1980s – present

Joshy Mathew (Malayalam: ജോഷി മാത്യു) an Indian film director in Malayalam cinema, started his career in 1984 as an assistant to renowned director P. Padmarajan. Now he is the Chairman of MACTA (Malayalam Cinema Technicians Association. In 1992 he made feature debut with Nakshatra Koodaram (1992). Then followed Oru Kadankatha Pole (1993), Rajadhani (1994), Man of the Match (1996), Pathaam Nilayile Theevandy (Train in the 10th Floor)(2009), Upadesiyude Makan (2010), Black Forest (2013), In a land far away (2018) and Nombarakoodu (Nest of Sorrows) (2022).

== Filmography ==
- Nakshatra Koodaram (1992)
- Oru Kadankatha Pole (1993)
- Rajadhani (1994)
- Man of the Match (1996)
- Pathaam Nilayile Theevandy (Train in the 10th Floor)(2009)
- Upadesiyude Makan (2010)
- Black Forest (2013)
- Angu Doore Oru Desathu - In a Land Far Away (2018)
- Nombarakoodu (Nest of Sorrows) (2023)

== Awards ==
International Film Award (FIPRESCI Award at the IFFK 2009-Best Malayalam Film)

- 2009: Film - Pathaam Nilayile Theevandy (Train in the 10th Floor)(2009)

National Film Award

- 2012: Film - Black Forest (BEST FILM ON ENVIRONMENT CONSERVATION/ PRESERVATION)

Kerala State Film Award

- 2012: Film - Black Forest (Best Children's Film)

Kerala Film Critics Award

- 2012: Film - Black Forest (Best Environmental Film, Best Children's Film)
- 2018: Film - In a land far away - അങ്ങ് ദൂരെ ഒരു ദേശത്ത് (Best Children's Film) Kerala film critics award 2018
- 2022: Film - Nest of Sorrows - നൊമ്പരക്കൂട് (Special Mention: Acting - Somu Mathew) Kerala film critics award 2022
