= Bhoopathi (1997 film) =

- Directed by: Joshiy
- Written by: Dennis Joseph
- Screenplay by: Dennis Joseph
- Starring: Suresh Gopi; Priya Raman; Kanaka; Thilakan
- Cinematography: Sanjeev Shankar; Dinesh Babu
- Edited by: K. P. Hariharaputhran
- Music by: S. P. Venkatesh
- Production company: Jubilant Productions
- Distributed by: Jubilant Productions
- Release date: 9 April 1997
- Country: India
- Language: Malayalam

Bhoopathi is a 1997 Indian Malayalam film, directed by Joshiy. The film stars Suresh Gopi, Priya Raman, Kanaka and Thilakan. The film has musical score by S. P. Venkatesh.

== Plot ==
Williams, a convict in prison, learns that Hariprasad killed Lakshmi, his daughter's friend. Angry and intent on killing Hariprasad, Williams soon discovers that Hariprasad was framed for her murder.

== Cast ==
- Suresh Gopi as Hariprasad a.k.a. Hari
- Priya Raman as Julie Williams
- Kanaka as Lakshmi Hariprasad, Hari's wife
- Thilakan as Chindan a.k.a. Bawa
- Narendra Prasad as Mahendra Varma Thampuran, Lakshmi's father
- Devan as Lawrence a.k.a. Krishna Varma Thampuran, Lakshmi's uncle
- Rajan P. Dev as Williams, Julie's father
- N. F. Varghese as Moosa / Moosakka, Lawrence's business partner and Bawa's ally
- Murali as Adv. Ravi Varma
- Sai Kumar as Dr. Sasi Varma, Ravi's brother
- Bheeman Raghu as Anthony
- Mohan Raj as Khader
- Hemanth Ravan as Christy
- K. P. A. C. Azeez as Jail Superintendent
- Sukumari as Maggie, Julie's mother and Williams's wife
- Shammi Thilakan as Younger Chindan
- Sona Nair as Meera
- Valsala Menon as Lakshmi's mother and Mahendra Varma's wife
- Chali Pala as Parameswaran
- Darshana as Nurse Susan, Sasi Varma's girlfriend

== Release ==
The film was later dubbed and released in Tamil as Minnal.

== View the film ==
- BHOOPATHI Malayalam film
