= J. Williams (cinematographer) =

Indian film director and cinematographer (1948–2005)

- Born: 26 August 1948; Thiruvananthapuram
- Died: 20 February 2005 (aged 56); Hyderabad, Andhra Pradesh
- Occupations: Producer; Director; Cinematographer
- Years active: 1974 – 2005
- Spouse: Shanthi Williams
- Children: 4

J. Williams was a producer, director and cinematographer of Malayalam language films. Primarily known as a cameraman, he has also directed 8 films and has worked in Tamil, Telugu and Kannada language films as well.

Williams made his debut as a cinematographer with Vishnu Vijayam (1974), starring Kamal Haasan. Over the course of his career, he worked on more than 50 films. He was noted for his experimental approach to cinematography and for executing technically challenging shots.

== Personal life ==
He married actress Shanthi Williams in 1979. They had four children. He died at age 56 due to terminal cancer.

== Filmography ==
=== Cinematography ===
- Vishnu Vijayam (1974)
- Njan Ninne Premikkunnu (1975)
- Thulavarsham (1976)
- Anubhavam (1976)
- Siva Thandavum (1977)
- Sreedevi (1977)
- Vishukkani (1977)
- Rathimanmadhan (1977)
- Poojakkedukkatha Pookkal (1977)
- Kaavilamma (1977)
- Adimakkachavadam (1978)
- Madanolsavam (1978)
- Madaalasa (1978)
- Thamburatti (1978)
- Chuvanna Chirakukal (1979)
- Aval Niraparaadhi (1979)
- Devadaasi (1979)
- Mr. Michael (1980)
- Benz Vasu (1980)
- Kaaliya Mardhanam (1982)
- Anuraagakkodathi (1982)
- Pooviriyum Pulari (1982)
- Ivan Oru Simham (1982)
- Padayottam (1982 - additional photography
- Bheeman (1982)
- Kodungattu (1983)
- Hello Madras Girl (1983)
- Jeevante Jeevan (1985)
- Ezhu Muthal Onpathu Vare (1985)
- Pathamudayam (1985)
- Kannaram Pothi Pothi (1985)
- Sunil Vayassu 20 (1986)
- Panchagni (1986) - Responsible for shooting one scene where aggressive dogs are set on a young tribal woman by a landlord
- Viswasichaalum Illenkilum (1986)
- Aattakatha (1987)
- Agni Muhurtham (1987)
- Janmandharam (1988)
- Douthyam (1989)
- Puthiya Karukkal (1989)
- Carnivel(1989)
- Bhoomika (1991)
- Koodikazhcha (1991)
- Inspector Balram (1991)
- Naangal (1992) (Tamil film)
- Uppukandam Brothers (1993)
- Butterflies (1993)
- Rajadhani (1994)
- Spadikam (1995)
- Neela Kuyil (1995) (Tamil film)
- Kalaapam (1998)
- James Bond (1999)
- The Gang (2000)
- Bamboo Boys (2002)

=== Direction ===
- Madaalasa (1978)
- Mr. Michael (1980)
- Kaaliya Mardhanam (1982)
- Ponnethooval (1983)
- Hello Madras Girl (1983)
- Jeevante Jeevan (1985)
- Aattakatha (1987)
- Rishi (1992)
- Gentleman Security (1994)
- The Gang (2000)

=== Story ===
- Madaalasa (1978)
- Jeevante Jeevan (1985)
- Rishi (1992)

=== Screenplay ===
- Madaalasa (1978)
- Jeevante Jeevan (1985)
