= Reghu Kumar =

P. K. Reghu Kumar Varma
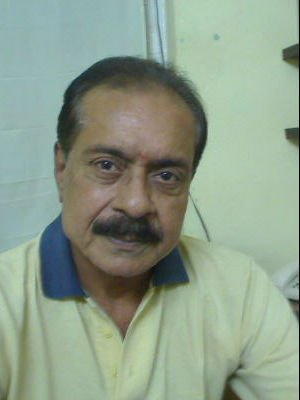

Background information
- Born: P. K. Reghu Kumar Varma; 13 July 1953; Kozhikode, Kerala
- Died: 20 February 2014 (aged 60) Chennai, Tamil Nadu
- Genres: Indian classical, Hindustani classical, Carnatic classical, world fusion, blues, pop, Indian film music
- Occupations: Musician, composer
- Instruments: Tabla, sitar, percussion, keyboards, drums, vocals
- Labels: Gramophone Company India, Tarangini, Inreco, BMG India, MagnaSound, Ranjini Cassettes

P. K. Reghukumar (Raghukumar; 13 June 1953 – 20 February 2014) was a noted music composer from Kerala, India. His compositions first achieved prominence in the 1980s.

== Life and work ==
Born into the prominent Pootheri family at Kozhikode in Kerala on 13 June 1953, Raghukumar started training in Indian classical music with Carnatic vocals at an early age under the tutelage of Guru G.S.Sreekrishnan. Subsequently, he took training in Indian percussion on the tabla under the able guidance of Guru Balasubramaniam (of All India Radio). Fascinated by Hindustani music, Raghukumar started training on the sitar under Guru Vincent (a.k.a. Vincent Master).

At the age of 15, Raghukumar debuted on stage as an accompanying artist for eminent musicians of Indian classical and Western percussion from all over India. At the age of 16, he was a graded percussionist for All India Radio. He then graduated to grade 'A' music composer for All India Radio. He made an entry into the film industry as a musician under the guidance of the eminent music arranger/composer R. K. Shekhar (Father of A. R. Rahman).

Raghukumar was married to the actress Bhavani. The couple have two daughters : Bhavana and Bhavitha.

Raghukumar died at the age of 60 on 20 February 2014, due to kidney failure. He was survived by his wife, children and siblings, Prasanna and Vijayakumar.

== Famous hits ==
1. Thalavattam
2. Hello My Dear Wrong Number
3. Shyama (film)
4. Boeing Boeing
5. Maya Mayuram
6. Kanakkinavu
7. Aryan (1988 film)
8. Dheera
9. Collector (2011 film)
10. Subhadram
11. Cheppu
12. Onnanamkunnul Oradikunnil
13. Aram + Aram = Kinnaram
14. Ayiram Kannukal
15. Ithramathram
16. Veendum Lisa

== Discography ==
=== Films ===
- Visham
- Onnanam Kunnil Oradi Kunnil
- Aram + Aram = Kinnaram
- Ponthooval
- Onnum Mindatha Bharya
- Nathi Muthal Nathi Vare
- Veendum Lisa
- Ithra Mathram
- Paavam Poornima
- Hello My Dear Wrong Number
- Cheppu
- Aryan
- Ayiram Kannukal
- Manasariyathe
- Amina Tailors
- Kottum Kuravayum
- Aattakatha
- Kaanaakinaavu
- Maya Mayuram
- Shyama
- Pauran
- Subadram
- Eswara Jagadeeshwara
- Manasille Manpeda
- Thalavattam
- Boeing Boeing
- Dheera (1982)
- Collector

=== Albums ===
- Gaana Pournami (1985) (Gramophone Company India)
- Chingappulari (1985) (Sootti Cassettes)
- Sweet Melodies Vol-3 (1987) (Tharangini)
- Athappoo (1988) (CBS)
- Thulasi Mala Vol-2 (1995) (Tharangini)
- Ponnona Tharangini Vol-4 (1995) (Tharangini)
- Hari Narayana (1995) (Magnasound)
- Swami Paadam (1996) (Sarangi Music)
- Chithira Thumbi (1997) (Audiotracs)
- Aarathi (2000) (Jubilee Audios)
- Varumo Vasantham (2008) (Sathyam Audios)
- Chithra Vasantham (Audiotracs)
- Pathinettam Padi (Pyramid)
- Kaanipponu
- Harinamakkili
- Sarana Yathra
- Pushpolsavam
- Pranaya Swarangal
