= Dheera =

- Directed by: Robin Roy
- Written by: Pappanamkodu Lakshmanan
- Produced by: Raghu Kumar
- Starring: Sukumaran; Ambika; M. G. Soman; Sumalatha
- Music by: Raghu Kumar
- Production company: Dhanya Films
- Distributed by: Dhanya Films
- Release date: 9 April 1982
- Country: India
- Language: Malayalam

Dheera is a 1982 Indian Malayalam film, directed by Joshiy and produced by Raghu Kumar. The film stars Sukumaran, Ambika, M. G. Soman and Sumalatha in the lead roles. The film has musical score by Raghu Kumar.

== Cast ==
- Sukumaran as Vinod
- Ambika as Indu
- M. G. Soman as Mohan
- Sumalatha as Rathi
- Srividya as Vimala Menon (Rani)
- Jose Prakash as Fernandez
- Rohini as Rani (Young Vimala)
- K. P. Ummer as Sankaran Nair
- Prathapachandran as Velayudhan
- Balan K Nair as Moidu, Abdulla (double role)
- Janardhanan as Rajasekharan
- Cochin Haneefa as Williams
- Bhagyalakshmi as Rekha
- Jagannatha Varma as D.I.G Varma
- Radhadevi as Rajasekharan's wife
- Chandran as Raghavan
- James as Waiter
- P. R. Menon as Raped girl's father

== Soundtrack ==
The music was composed by Raghu Kumar and the lyrics were written by Poovachal Khader.

No.	Song	Singers	Lyrics	Length (m:ss)
1	"Hridayathil Oru Kurukshethram"	K. J. Yesudas	Poovachal Khader	
2	"Jeevitham Aaro Ezhuthum"	K. J. Yesudas	Poovachal Khader	
3	"Melle Nee Melle Varu"	S. Janaki, Satheesh Babu	Poovachal Khader	
4	"Mrudule Itha Oru Bhaava Geethamitha"	P. Jayachandran	Poovachal Khader	
5	"Pongi Pongippaarum En Mohame"	S. Janaki, Chorus	Poovachal Khader	
6	"Swarangalil Sakhi"	K. J. Yesudas, Chorus	Poovachal Khader	
