= Aattakatha (1987 film) =

1987 film

- Directed by: J. Williams
- Written by: Balu Kiriyath
- Screenplay by: Balu Kiriyath
- Produced by: Thiruppathi Chettiyar
- Starring: Ratheesh; Jagathy Sreekumar; Innocent; Captain Raju
- Cinematography: J. Williams
- Edited by: K. Sankunni
- Music by: Raghu Kumar
- Production company: Evershine
- Distributed by: Evershine
- Release date: 12 July 1987
- Country: India
- Language: Malayalam

Aattakatha is a 1987 Indian Malayalam film, directed by J. Williams and produced by Thiruppathi Chettiyar. The film stars Ratheesh, Jagathy Sreekumar, Innocent and Captain Raju in the lead roles. The film has musical score by Raghu Kumar.

== Cast ==
- Ratheesh
- Jagathy Sreekumar
- Innocent
- Captain Raju
- Ilavarasi
- Sukumari
- Raveendran
- Murali
- Lalu Alex
- Jose Prakash
- Ravi Menon
- Kaduvakkulam Antony
- Rajasekharan
- Peethambaram
- Pradeep Shakthi
- Amjath

== Soundtrack ==
Raghu Kumar composed the music for the film, with lyrics written by Balu Kiriyath.

No.	Song	Singers	Lyrics	Length (m:ss)
1	"Chellathen Kilikal"	K. J. Yesudas, Vani Jairam	Balu Kiriyath	
