= Jubilee Productions =

Indian Film Production and Distribution Company

- Company type: Private Limited Company
- Industry: Motion Pictures
- Predecessor: Jubilee Pictures
- Founded: 1975
- Founder: Joy Thomas
- Defunct: 1993; 33 years ago
- Headquarters: Kottayam, Kerala, India
- Key people: Joy Thomas (Managing Director); Laila Joy (Director)
- Products: Film Production; Film Distribution

Jubilee Productions Private Limited was an Indian film production and distribution company found by producer Joy Thomas in the year 1975. The company was initially formed as Jubilee Pictures for the distribution of films in Kerala and later following success it was transformed to Jubilee Productions. The head office of Jubilee Productions is situated in Kottayam, Kerala. Joy Thomas won the one National Film Award & one Filmfare Award.

== Distributions ==
Joy Thomas distributed Malayalam and Tamil movies in Kerala under the banner of Jubilee Pictures.

Year	Film	Director	Producer	Notes	Rights
1973	Thaniniram	J. Sasikumar	Muhammad Assam	Second round release in Travancore area.	
1962	Kannum Karalum	K. S. Sethumadhavan	A. K. Balasubramaniam	Second round release in Travancore area.	
1978	Pokkattadikkaari	PG Vishwambharan		Distributor for Travancore area.	
1978	Puthariyankam	PG Vishwambharan	Umamini Movies	First movie to be distributed across Kerala by Jubilee.	
1979	Choola	J. Sasikumar	Navarathna Movie Makers	Dubbing artist Kulathupuzha Ravi became music director Raveendran.	
1981	Panneer Pushpangal	Bharathi-Vasu	Padmini	Malayalam dubbed version titled Panineer Pookkal	
1982	Moondram Pirai	Balu Mahendra	G. Thyagarajan and G. Saravanan	Kerala distribution	
1982	Madrasile Mon	J. Sasikumar	Mani Malliath		Kairali TV
1985	Ivide Ingane	Joshiy			
1985	Mutharamkunnu P.O.	Sibi Malayil	G. Subramanian		Share With Asianet and Flowers
1986	Kariyilakkattu Pole	P. Padmarajan	Thankachan	Co-Produced by Joy Thomas, Vishudhi Films	Flowers
1986	Rajavinte Makan	Thambi Kannanthanam	Sharon Pictures	Sharon Pictures	Surya TV
1986	Kshamichu Ennoru Vakku	Joshiy			Flowers
1986	Moonnu Masangalku Mumbu	Cochin Haneefa	Muhammed Mannil		Asianet
1987	Oru Minnaminunginte Nurunguvettam	Bharathan	Babu Thiruvalla		Asianet
1987	Kathakku Pinnil	K. G. George	Mathew Paulose		Flowers
1987	Uppu	V. K. Pavithran	K. M. A. Rahim		Flowers
1987	Oru Sindoora Pottinte Ormaykku	Cochin Haneefa	Muhammed Mannil		Flowers
1987	Vazhiyorakkaazhchakal	Thampi Kannanthanam	Thampi Kannanthanam		Surya TV
1988	Dhinarathrangal	Joshiy	S. V. Krishna Reddy	Sharon Pictures	Kairali TV
1988	Janmandharam	Thampi Kannanthanam	Thampi Kannanthanam	Sharon Pictures	Asianet
1988	Kandathum Kettathum	Balachandra Menon	Bhavana		Flowers
1988	Oru Vivaada Vishayam	P.G. Viswambharan			Flowers
1988	Witness	Viji Thampi			Amrita TV
1989	Puthiya Karukkal	Thampi Kannanthanam	Thampi Kannanthanam	Sharon Pictures	Flowers
1989	Mahayanam	Joshiy	C T Rajan		Flowers
1989	Najangalude Kochu Doctor	Balachandra Menon	T V Rajan		Flowers
1990	Mathilukal	Adoor Gopalakrishnan	Adoor Gopalakrishnan		
1990	Gajakesariyogam	P. G. Viswambharan	Mumthaz Basheer	Pratheeksha Pictures	Amrita TV
1990	Indrajaalam	Thampi Kannanthanam	Thampi Kannanthanam	Distribution was done by Julia Pictures through Jubilee	Surya TV
1991	Mimics Parade	Thulasidas	Mumthas Basheer	Distribution was done by "Keerthi Pictures" through Jubilee Pictures (credited the same way in movie)	Flowers
1991	Nagarathil Samsara Vishayam	Prasanth	Mumthaz Basheer		Flowers
1991	Kilukkampetti	Shaji Kailas	K Baiju	Distribution was done by "Keerthi Pictures" through Jubilee	Asianet
1991	Sundhari Kakka	Mahesh Soman	V Varghese	Distribution was done by "Soorya Creations" through Jelitta	
1991	Kadalora Kattu	C P Joemon	Thampi Kannanthanam		Flowers
1992	Kunukkitta Kozhi	Viji Thampi	Mumthas Basheer	Keerthi Pictures	Flowers
1992	Manthrikacheppu	Anil Babu	M. Thulasidaran		Zee Keralam
1992	First Bell	PG Vishwambharan			Flowers
1992	Kasarkode Khaderbai	Thulasidas		Distribution was done by "Simple Pictures" through Jubilee Pictures	Asianet
1992	Vietnam Colony	Siddique-Lal	Swargachitra Appachan, Joy Thomas	Distribution was done by "Swargachithra" . Produced By Appachan and Joy Thomas	Asianet
1992	Naadody	Thampi Kannanthanam	Thampi Kannanthanam	Distribution was done by "Julia Pictures" Through Jubilee	Surya TV
1993	Vatsalyam	Cochin Haneefa	Movie Basheer	Keerthi Pictures	Flowers
1993	Pavithram	T. K. Rajeev Kumar	Thankachan	Co-Produced by Joy Thomas, Vishudhi Films	Flowers
1993	Injakkadan Mathai & Sons	Anil Babu		Distribution was done by "Jubilant Productions" through Jubilee Pictures (credited the same way in movie)	Flowers
1993	Mafia	Shaji Kailas			Flowers
1994	Kambolam	Baiju Kottarakkara	Sathaar		Flowers
1994	Vendor Daniel State Licency	Balu Kiriyath	K. E. Ahmed	Distribution By Jubilant Films	Kairali TV
1995	Achan Kombathu Amma Varampathu	Anil Babu	Saji Thomas		Flowers
1995	Street	Anil Babu	Koshi, Palamuttam Majeed	Distribution By Jubilant Films	Flowers
1995	Indian Military Intelligence	T. S. Suresh Babu	K.G Nair	Distribution By Sun Movies	
1995	Radholsavam	Anil Babu		Distribution By Vijaya Films Through Jubilee Pictures	Zee Keralam
1996	Harbour	Anil Babu		Distribution By Priya Vision Through Jubilee Pictures	Flowers
1997	Bhoopathi	Joshiy			Asianet
1997	Poonilamazha	Sunil	Bindu		

== Productions ==
After a successful career in distribution, Joy Thomas incorporated Jubilee Productions for production of movies. All movies produced under Jubilee Productions was distributed by Jubilee itself.

Year	Film	Director	Notes
1983	Aa Raathri	Joshiy	Story by Joy Thomas
1983	Aattakalasam	J. Sasikumar	
1984	Sandarbham	Joshiy	
1984	Ente Upasana	Bharathan	
1985	Makan Ente Makan	J. Sasikumar	
1985	Katha Ithuvare	Joshiy	
1985	Nirakkoottu	Joshiy	Won: Filmfare Award for Best Film - Malayalam
1986	Sathya Jyothi	K. Rangaraj	First Kannada venture of Jubilee Productions jointly produced with Sathya Jyothi Films. It was the remake of the Malayalam movie Nirakkoottu.
1986	Shyama	Joshiy	
1986	Nyayavidhi	Joshiy	
1986	Pranamam	Bharathan	
1987	Bhoomiyile Rajakkanmar	Thampi Kannanthanam	
1987	New Delhi	Joshiy	
1988	Manu Uncle	Dennis Joseph	Won: National Film Award for Best Children's Film.
1990	Marupuram	Viji Thampi	
1992	Ezhara Ponnana	Thulasidas	
1992	My Dear Muthachan	Sathyan Anthikad	
