= Rajavinte Makan =

1986 film by Thambi Kannanthanam

- Theatrical release poster
- Directed by: Thambi Kannanthanam
- Screenplay by: Dennis Joseph
- Story by: Rajeev
- Produced by: Thambi Kannanthanam
- Starring: Mohanlal; Suresh Gopi; Ratheesh; Ambika; Mohan Jose
- Cinematography: Jayanan Vincent
- Edited by: K. Sankunni
- Music by: S. P. Venkatesh
- Production company: Sharon Pictures
- Distributed by: Jubilee Productions
- Release date: 16 July 1986 (India)
- Running time: 132 minutes
- Country: India
- Language: Malayalam

Rajavinte Makan (transl. The King's Son) is a 1986 Indian Malayalam-language gangster film directed and produced by Thampi Kannanthanam from a screenplay written by Dennis Joseph and based on the 1980 novel Rage of Angels by Sidney Sheldon. It was remade in Tamil as Makkal En Pakkam. It stars Mohanlal, Ratheesh, Ambika and Mohan Jose. In the film, Vincent Gomes sets out to exact revenge against Home Minister N. Krishnadas.

Kannanthanam's 1985 film Aa Neram Alppa Dooram was commercially unsuccessful, which jeopardised his career. This led him to create his own production company Sharon Pictures. It was shot extensively in and around Ernakulam. Filming began in early 1986 and took about one month to complete. The film was shot with a relatively small budget compared to films at the time as Kannanthanam was in financial crisis at the time. The soundtrack was composed by S. P. Venkatesh, while the cinematography and editing were handled by Jayanan Vincent and K. Sankunni.

Rajavinte Makan was released on 16 July 1986 and became a turning point in Mohanlal's career as it catapulted him into superstardom in Kerala. It was remade in Tamil as Makkal En Pakkam and in Kannada as Athiratha Maharatha. Ambika reprised her role in Tamil and Kannada versions. It was also remade in Telugu as Aahuthi and in Hindi as Kanwarlal.

== Plot ==
Vincent Gomes is a notorious gangster who wants to exact revenge against Kerala Home Minister N. Krishnadas as Krishnadas worked with Vincent earlier, but Krishnadas double-crossed Vincent in order to gain favour among the people and the political party. Vincent plans a payback and becomes successful after manipulating Adv. Nancy, who carries the case of his file which if submitted to the court may lead to imprisonment for several years.

Vincent learns that Nancy's struggles as an orphan and a single mother. Due to Vincent's plan, Nancy loses her job and Vincent, who is remorseful of his actions, makes amends to Nancy and become friends. Vincent confesses to Nancy and tells her that he wants to stop his activities and proposes to her. However, Nancy denies and tells him that she cannot accept anyone else as her husband. Krishnadas goes after Vincent with his political power, where Vincent loses his wealth.

Vincent plans to kill Krishnadas and entrusts the duty to his trusted friends Kumar and Peter. However, Kumar and Peter are killed during the assassination attempt against Krishnadas. Enraged, Vincent drives towards Krishnadas' guest house where he kills many policemen and Krishnadas's political aides. When Vincent is about to kill Krishnadas, Nancy begs for Krishnadas's life and proclaims that Krishnadas is the father of her child. With Vincent being shocked at the revelation, the cops reach the site and shoots Vincent. Vincent dies as Nancy rushes to his side, sadly holding his dead body. The film ends with Nancy staring at a picture of Vincent Gomes, the most powerful underworld don to have lived.

== Cast ==
- Mohanlal as Vincent Gomes: crime boss
- Ratheesh as Krishnadas C. K: A Democratic Party member and former ally of Vincent Gomes, who later becomes the Minister of Home Affairs
- Ambika: Nancy, an advocate
- Suresh Gopi as Kumar: A loyal accomplice to Vincent Gomes
- Mohan Jose as Peter: A loyal accomplice to Vincent Gomes
- K. P. A. C. Azeez as Panicker: Advocate of Vincent Gomes
- Adoor Bhasi as Fr. Stephen Pothen, the priest / warden of the orphanage
- Kanakalatha
- Kundara Johnny as Venu, a gangster
- K. P. A. C. Sunny as K. Venkitachalam, Public Prosecutor
- Alex Mathew as Tony, Student leader
- Jose Prakash as Chief Minister Balagopal
- Kunchan as Krishnankutty
- Prathapachandran as Raghavan
- Chaplin as Hotel Staff

== Production ==
=== Development ===
Thampi Kannanthanam and Dennis Joseph had earlier collaborated in the revenge drama, Aa Neram Alppa Dooram (1985). However, the film was a critical and commercial failure. Following this, Kannanthanam stopped receiving offers for direction from producers. This plunged him into financial crisis. Dennis Joseph had on the other hand established himself as one of the most sought after scriptwriters in the Malayalam film industry with the successes of Nirakkoottu and Shyama.

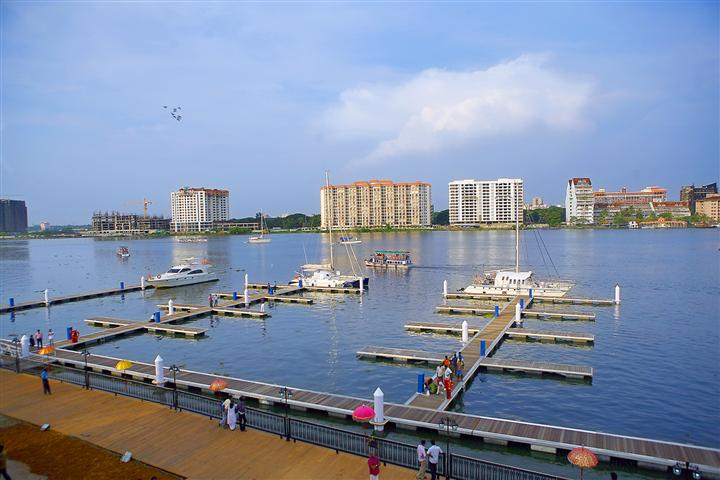
The film was fully shot in 32 days, with 28 days of shooting taking place in Eranakulam.

After talking with his friend, Joshiy, Kannanthanam decided to venture into production by directing his first production venture. On Joshiy's request Kannanthanam met Dennis Joseph in Madras (now known as Chennai) to brainstorm ideas for a new film. Dennis had suggested that they do a film set in a tribal background, similar to Madhumati (1958). However, Kannanthanam wasn't keen on the idea as the theme had already been explored by J. Sasikumar, to whom he had served as assistant director, in Picnic (1975). Then, Dennis narrated the story of Rajavinte Makan to Kannanthanam. Since the story had its protagonist in an antihero role Dennis did not think the film could perform well at the box office. However, Kannanthanam liked the story and asked Dennis Joseph to prepare a script. The film's script took Dennis 5–6 days to complete.

=== Casting ===
Dennis Joseph wanted Mammootty to play the role of Vincent Gomes in the film. He narrated the script to Mammootty, which the latter liked. However, on learning that the film was being produced and directed by Kannanthanam, Mammootty backed out. In a 2018 interview with Safari TV, Dennis Joseph told that the failure of Kannanthanam's Aa Neram Alppa Dooram affected Mammootty very much and he was not keen on working with Kannanthanam again. The incident created a permanent rift between them. Following Mammootty's rejection, they approached Mohanlal on the sets of Kariyilakkattu Pole, who was ready to do the film. This led to Dennis making modifications to the script to suit Mohanlal's style. To meet the film's budget Kannanthanam had to sell his car and ancestral property. The film also marked the debut of S. P. Venkatesh. The female lead was chosen to be Ambika. Her mother, Kallara Sarasamma told Thambi that he should pay her ₹1.25 lakhs. However, after a few days Ambika adjusted the amount to ₹1 lakh. Mohanlal was paid a remuneration of ₹1 lakh, the same as Ambika.

For the role of Vincent Gomes' right-hand man, Kannanthanam suggested a few names to Dennis. However, they rejected the role citing that they did not want to play right hand to Mohanlal. Dennis Joseph then suggested that the role be split into two. For one of them, Dennis suggested K. G. George's relative, Mohan Jose. For the second role, they decided to cast a new face. Gayathri Ashokan sent Dennis a few stills from the 1985 film Onnu Muthal Poojyam Vare featuring Suresh Gopi. Impressed by his looks, Kannanthanam called Suresh for an interview and was cast in the film. This was Suresh Gopi's first major role in Malayalam cinema.

== Themes ==
The basic plot of Rage of Angles by Sidney Sheldon was adapted by Dennis Joseph for Rajavinte Makan. However, the book has been uncredited. In Rage of Angels, the central character is a top female lawyer, Jennifer Parker who is torn between a top US senator and a mafia chief. Rajavinte Makan features a female prosecutor, Nancy who vacillates between the home minister, Krishnadas and the liquor baron, Vincent Gomes. Sreedhar Pillai of India Today felt that the film showcased overtly political themes and also felt that the characters of Krishnadas and Vincent Gomes closely resembled former home minister Vayalar Ravi and liquor baron Chandrasenan. Writing for Full Picture, Aradhya Kurup wrote, "This uncredited adaptation is a toned-down version of the powerful narrative by Sheldon. One of the highlights of the film is the mafia don's characterization — Vincent Gomez. He is a calmer version of the fierce Michael Moretti. Understandably, the cinema chooses to glorify the don and cut down the heroine's role."

== Music ==
Rajavinte Makan

Soundtrack album by S. P. Venkatesh
- Released: 1986
- Genre: Popular music
- Length: 12:34
- Language: Malayalam
- Label: Ranjni Audios
- Producer: S. P. Venkatesh

S. P. Venkatesh chronology
Vivahithare Ithile (1986)	Rajavinte Makan (1986)	Bhoomiyile Rajakkanmar (1986)

The soundtrack features three songs composed by S. P. Venkatesh, with lyrics penned by Shibu Chakravarthy. Venkatesh got his break from this film.

Rajavinte Makan
No.	Title	Singer(s)	Length
1.	"Vinnile Gandharva"	Unni Menon	03:52
2.	"Paadam Njan Aa Ganam"	Lathika	04:30
3.	"Devangane"	Unni Menon, Lathika	04:12
Total length:			12:34

== Release ==
The film was released on 16 July 1986. The film was certified with a U certificate. In Kerala, the film was distributed by Joy Thomas through Jubilee Productions. After watching the film S. N. Swamy visited Dennis Joseph and told him that the film would be a failure at the box office. Swamy felt that the film's political theme was more suited for scriptwriters such as T. Damodaran. However the film was a major commercial success, completing a 100-day theatrical run.

== Legacy ==
Rajavinte Makan is considered to be the turning point in Mohanlal's career as it shot him into superstardom in Malayalam cinema. Even the dialogues from the movie are still famous today, such as: "My phone number is 2255." This dialogue was referenced in the 2022 film Aaraattu. The character of Vincent Gomes portrayed by Mohanlal has over the years attained a cult status in Malayalam cinema. In an interview, the writer Dennis Joseph states: "He is not one of those loud, flamboyant dons. He is soft-spoken yet menacing in an understated way. That's what makes Vincent Gomez so iconic." The film title design of Rajavinte Makan was reused for Kannanthanam's next project, Vazhiyorakkazhchakal (1987) believing it to be a sign of good luck.
