= List of 1982 films based on actual events =

This is a list of films and miniseries released in 1982 that are based on actual events. All films on this list are from American production unless indicated otherwise.

== 1982 ==
- A Square of Sky (German: Ein Stück Himmel) (1982) – West German biographical drama miniseries based on Janina David's childhood as a Jew in Wartime Poland
- A Woman Called Golda (1982) – biographical television film about Israeli Prime Minister Golda Meir
- Angel (Greek: Άγγελος) (1982) – Greek drama film based on the love affair of 19-year-old sailor Christos Roussos and 22-year-old sailor Anestis Papadopoulos, a relationship that led to the murder of the latter on 7 April 1976, and the conviction of Christos, names in the film differ from reality
- Another Way (Hungarian: Egymásra nézve) (1982) – Hungarian historical biographical drama film about an affair between two women – based on a semi-autobiographical novella Another Love (Törvényen belül) by Erzsébet Galgóczi
- Antonieta (1982) – French-Mexican-Spanish biographical war drama film centring on the life of Antonieta Rivas Mercado, a Mexican writer who killed herself inside Paris' Notre Dame in 1931
- Attack Force Z (1982) – Australian-Taiwanese war film about the Z Special Unit during the Second World War
- The Ballad of Gregorio Cortez (1982) – Western drama film about the life of Gregorio Cortez
- The Best Little Whorehouse in Texas (1982) – musical comedy film based on a story by Larry L. King that was inspired by the real-life Chicken Ranch in La Grange, Texas
- Boy Meets Girl (Hebrew: בן לוקח בת) (1982) – Israeli biographical drama film depicting a semi-autobiographical account of Bat-Adams' own upbringing at a kibbutz boarding school
- Cavalleria rusticana (1982) – Italian musical drama film based on the opera of the same name – based on real events
- Coming Out of the Ice (1982) – biographical television film based on the life of Victor Herman, a Jewish-American who spent 18 years as a Soviet prisoner in the Gulags of Siberia
- Death of Yazdgerd (Persian: مرگ یزدگرد) (1982) – Iranian historical drama film based on the murder of Yazdgerd III, the last emperor of Sasanian Persia
- The Elephant Man (1982) – biographical television film about the 19th-century English medical curiosity Joseph Merrick
- Endangered Species (1982) – science fiction horror film based on the then current headlines of cattle mutilations
- The Entity (1982) – supernatural horror film based on the 1974 case of Doris Bither, a woman who claimed to have been repeatedly sexually assaulted by an invisible entity, and who was observed by doctoral students at the University of California, Los Angeles
- The Executioner's Song (1982) – biographical crime drama television film about the final nine months of the life of Gary Gilmore, beginning with his release from prison at the age of 35 after serving 12 years for robbery in Indiana
- Fitzcarraldo (1982) – West German epic adventure film derived from the historic events of Peruvian rubber baron, Carlos Fitzcarrald
- Flight of the Eagle (Swedish: Ingenjör Andrées luftfärd) (1982) – Swedish biographical drama film depiciting the true story of S. A. Andrée's Arctic balloon expedition of 1897, an ill-fated effort to reach the North Pole in which all three expedition members perished
- Frances (1982) – biographical drama film about Frances Farmer, a troubled actress during the 1930s whose career suffered as a result of her mental illness
- Gandhi (1982) – epic biographical film based on the life of Mahatma Gandhi, the leader of an Indian independence movement against the British Empire during the 20th century
- The Grey Fox (1982) – Canadian biographical Western film based on the true story of Bill Miner, an American stagecoach robber who staged his first Canadian train robbery on 10 September 1904
- Heatwave (1982) – Australian drama film based on the murder of Juanita Nielsen
- The Highest Honour (Japanese: 南十字星) (1982) – Australian-Japanese war drama television film about Operation Jaywick and Operation Rimau by Z Special Unit during World War II
- I Remember Nelson (1982) – British historical miniseries portraying the relationship between Horatio Nelson and Emma Hamilton in the period leading up the Battle of Trafalgar
- I'm Dancing as Fast as I Can (1982) – biographical film about Barbara Gordon, whose addiction to and difficult withdrawal from Valium serves as the basis of the plot
- If You Could See What I Hear (1982) – Canadian biographical drama film about blind musician Tom Sullivan
- Inside the Third Reich (1982) – biographical drama television film dramatizing the life of Albert Speer, Adolf Hitler's young architect and one-time confidant, and his meteoric rise into the Nazi hierarchy
- Legend of a Fighter (Cantonese: 霍元甲) (1982) – Hong Kong martial arts film based on the story of Chinese martial artist Huo Yuanjia
- Little Gloria... Happy at Last (1982) – American-British biographical drama miniseries telling the story of the real-life heiress Gloria Vanderbilt and how her parents met and married
- Love Child (1982) – crime drama film based on the life of Terry Jean Moore, a young woman who was convicted of a crime at the age of 19 and gets pregnant in jail
- Love Is Forever (1982) – adventure drama film based on the experiences of Australian journalist John Everingham in Laos and Thailand
- Luz del Fuego (1982) – Brazilian drama film depicting a liberal and romantic narrative of the controversial Brazilian vedette and activist Dora Vivacqua, better known by her stage name Luz del Fuego
- Macbeth (1982) – Hungarian drama television film based on the play of the same name by William Shakespeare – the story is the account of Macbeth, King of Scotland, Macduff, and Duncan
- Madrasile Mon (Malayalam: മദ്രാസിൽ മോൺ) (1982) – Indian Malayalam-language crime film based on the Karikkan villa murder case of 1980
- Mae West (1982) – biographical drama television film about the life of the comedian actress and writer Mae West
- Marian Rose White (1982) – drama television film based on the life of Marian Rose White, a California woman who as a 9-year-old was committed to a state mental institution and spent much of her life confined there
- Marco Polo (1982) – American-Italian historical drama miniseries about Marco Polo, the 13th-century Venetian merchant and explorer
- Missing (1982) – biographical thriller drama film based on the disappearance of American journalist Charles Horman, in the aftermath of the United States-backed Chilean coup of 1973, which deposed the democratically elected socialist President Salvador Allende
- Nancy Astor (1982) – British biographical drama miniseries portraying the career of Nancy Astor, the American-born socialite and Conservative Party politician who pioneered the role of women in the House of Commons
- Night Crossing (1982) – American-British thriller drama film based on the true story of the Strelzyk and Wetzel families, who on 16 September 1979, attempted to escape from East Germany to West Germany in a homemade hot-air balloon during the Inner German border-era when immigration to West Germany was strictly prohibited by the East German government
- The Return of Martin Guerre (French: Le Retour de Martin Guerre) (1982) – French historical drama film based on a case of imposture in 16th century France, involving Martin Guerre
- The Roaring Forties (French: Les quarantièmes rugissants) (1982) – French drama film about the death of the British round the world yachtsman Donald Crowhurst in 1969
- The Royal Romance of Charles and Diana (1982) – biographical drama television film depicting the events leading to the wedding of Prince Charles and Lady Diana Spencer
- Side by Side (1982) – biographical television film about the earlier years of the famed entertainment family
- Spaghetti House (1982) – Italian comedy film based on the Spaghetti House siege
- Squizzy Taylor (1982) – Australian drama film based on the life of Melbourne gangster, Squizzy Taylor
- Variola Vera (Serbo-Croatian: Вариола вера) (1982) – Yugoslav historical drama film based on the 1972 Yugoslav smallpox outbreak
- We of the Never Never (1982) – Australian drama film based on the experiences of Jeannie Gunn in the Australian outback during the 1930s
- The White Rose (German: Die Weiße Rose) (1982) – West German historical drama film about the White Rose resistance to the Nazis led by university students in Munich in 1942–1943 whose members were caught and executed in February 1943, shortly after the German capitulation at Stalingrad
- Will: G. Gordon Liddy (1982) – biographical drama television film depicting the rise and fall of Watergate co-conspirator G. Gordon Liddy
