= Rage of Angels =

1980 novel by Sidney Sheldon

- First edition
- Author: Sidney Sheldon
- Language: English
- Genre: Thriller novel
- Publisher: William Morrow
- Publication date: 1980
- Publication place: United States
- Media type: Print (Hardback & Paperback)
- ISBN: 978-0-446-35661-9

Rage of Angels is a novel by Sidney Sheldon published in 1980. The novel revolves around young attorney Jennifer Parker; as she rises as a successful lawyer, she gets into a series of ongoings that lead to intrigue with the mob and a rival attorney that promises to break her life's dreams. As the story progresses, the protagonist is romantically torn between a famous politician, who helps her rise again, and the Mafia boss who framed her. The boss swears to destroy her after he finds out about her affair with the politician and the child resulting from the affair.

== Plot summary ==
Jennifer Parker, a beautiful, inexperienced, newly sworn in Assistant District Attorney for the State of New York, inadvertently participates in a plot by Michael Moretti, the rising star of one of the most powerful organized crime families in America, to escape a trial. Manhattan District Attorney Robert Di Silva, believing that Jennifer is truly responsible, fires her and vows to destroy her for her part in the fiasco with Moretti. Di Silva initiates disbarment procedures against Jennifer, and young lawyer Adam Warner is assigned to investigate Jennifer. Adam immediately realizes that she is not guilty at all, and falls for her. With Adam's help Jennifer begins to rise again; meanwhile Moretti, inspired by her determination to succeed, follows her career from a distance.

Adam, despite being married and groomed for the United States Senate, cannot help falling in love with Jennifer. When he tells her that his wife Mary Beth has asked for a divorce, Jennifer meets with her. Being so close to the Senate election, the two women decide it is best for Adam to wait until after the election. But Mary Beth sleeps with Adam one last time, in the process tricking him into impregnating her. Adam learns that his wife is pregnant, wins the election and Jennifer ends their affair. Jennifer, having previously discovered that she too is pregnant and not wanting to be hurt by Adam, accepts but does not reveal to him that she is carrying his child.

Jennifer gives birth and names her son Joshua Adam Parker. Only her assistant Ken Bailey knows of Joshua's existence. Jennifer returns to her practice and soon makes headlines as a successful lawyer. Meanwhile, Moretti constantly tries to spark friendship with Jennifer, which she rebuffs at every attempt, reminding him of his earlier trick that was devastating to her early career. Nevertheless, when her son is kidnapped by a criminal Jennifer is defending, she, in desperation, turns to Moretti for help. After helping her, he seduces her and Jennifer eventually becomes the Family consigliere. Joshua dies following a water skiing accident. Jennifer and Moretti are soon being hunted down by the government; he shoots her, wrongly thinking she has betrayed him, and is killed himself in an FBI raid of his house. Adam is able to use his position to save Jennifer. Soon Jennifer watches on television as Adam is sworn in as President of the United States. Jennifer returns to her home town and a small law practice, with everyone she loved taken from her and all joy and happiness gone from her life.

== Adaptations ==
The novel was adapted into a miniseries in 1983, directed by Buzz Kulik and starring Jaclyn Smith, Armand Assante and Ken Howard. It was followed by a sequel, Rage of Angels: The Story Continues in 1986.

The 1985 Hindi Movie Bepanaah and 1986 Malayalam movie Rajavinte Makan was loosely based on this novel. This movie was remade in Tamil as Makkal En Pakkam, in Kannada as Athiratha Maharatha, in Telugu as Ahuthi and in Hindi as Kanwarlal.

The title was adopted by an American glam metal band formed in 1987 and a British metal band formed in 2011.
