= M. M. Alex =

Indian Malayalam actor

Dr. M. M. Alex
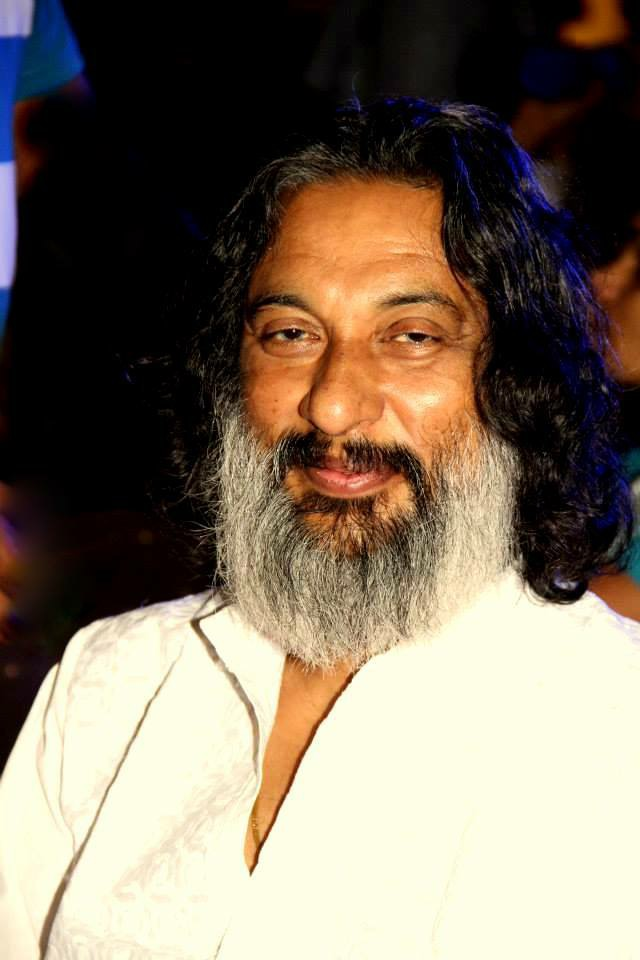
- Dr. Alex attending a function at Citi Centre Chennai
- Born: Mathew Mullasseril Alex; 25 May 1959; Kottayam, Kerala, India
- Died: 23 June 2015 (aged 56); Chennai, Tamil Nadu, India
- Education: CMS College, Kottayam; Michigan State University College of Human Medicine
- Occupations: Actor; Human Life Scientist
- Spouse: Anitha
- Children: 2, including Tejas
- Website: www.drmmalex.com

Mathew Mullasseril Alex (25 May 1959 – 23 June 2015), popularly known as Dr. M. M. Alex , was an Indian actor and alternative medicine researcher. He was known for starring in blockbuster Malayalam films, Rajavinte Makan (1986) and Thoovanathumbikal (1987) Alex produced more than 220 documentaries and digitisations on world peace, religion, tourism, health systems and human rights. He was also the founder of Vedik India Society and The Institute of Ancient Integrative Therapies Research. He also served as the jury member for the National Film Awards.

Alex was honoured with the "Ambassador of Peace Award" by Universal Peace Federation and "Samskrita Mitra" award by the Government of India. He was also the president of Samskrita Bharathi – Tamil Nadu.

Dr. M. M. Alex died from a cardiac arrest on 23 June 2015, aged 56.

== Early life ==
Dr. Alex was born as Mathew M. Alex in Kottayam, Kerala. He was the son of Ammini Alex, a panchayat officer and Health officer M. M. Alexander of the Mullasseril house. He grew up in Kottayam with his elder brother Shaji M. Alex and younger sister Saji M. Alex. He graduated from CMS College Kottayam, before starting his career as an actor.

Mathew later went by his father's name Alex and became M. M. Alex although it is not clear as to why.

== Career ==
=== Early career ===
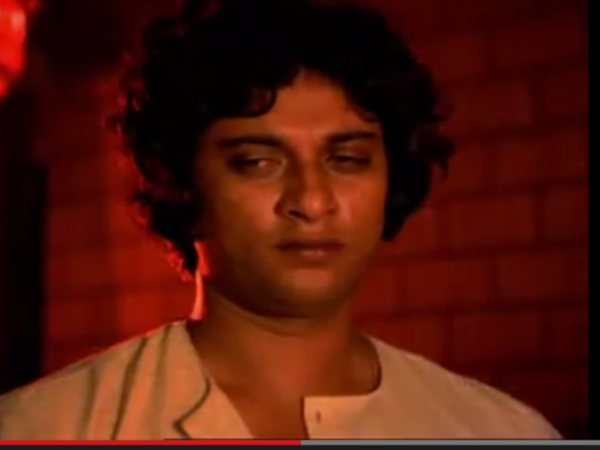
Alex as Babu in Thoovanathumbikal

Alex debuted in the Malayalam Blockbuster "Rajavinte Makan (1986)", as a student leader. The film starred Mohan Lal and Suresh Gopi. It was directed by Thampi Kannanthanam. He continued to reprise the same role in its remake, Makkal En Pakkam (Tamil – 1987). His flair for playing a villain bagged him roles in more than 60 films. He was well noted for his role as "Babu" in the successful film, "Thoovanathumbikal (1987)" starring Mohan Lal and directed by Padmarajan. His role as an antagonist gained him wide publicity. He concluded his acting career with the Malayalam film "Parampara (1990)" directed by Sibi Malayil. Though it was at the peak of his acting career, Alex decided to quit and enter the field of alternative medicine and spirituality.

=== Alternative medicine ===
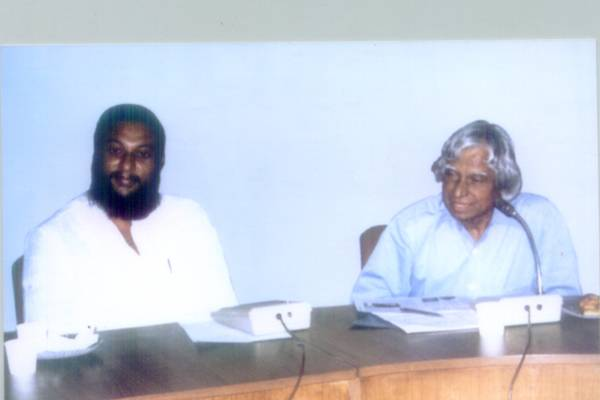
Dr. Alex with Dr. A P J Abdul Kalam at a conference, IIT Madras.

Dr. M. M. Alex received an honorary doctorate in Indology and alternative medicine from the Michigan State University College of Human Medicine. He founded the non-profit organisations Vedik-India Society (2000), E-Ducatus Foundation, Institute of Ancient Integrative Therapies and Research with his wife, Anitha Alex. He travelled extensively and digitised India district wise to promote Indian culture around the world. He also developed a massive database on 250 common ailments and therapies from eastern disciplines like Ayurveda, Yoga, Mantra, Tantra, Sangeetha Sastra, Manas Ayurveda and Gandharva Veda. He worked on merging modern and ancient medical therapies by creating a digital database on medical aspects of various alternative forms of treatment.

"When it comes to health and health care, we are ignorant. Self-realisation about the ancient systems of healing and good living combined with contemporary medicines can help improve the quality of life."

His work involved a comprehensive and integrated understanding of many systems and modules that operate in the fields of:

1. Western medical care and research (e.g. diagnostics, current pharmacological/surgical therapies and clinical discovery/trials methodology.
2. Life sciences (biology, biochemistry and genetics).
3. Traditional Indian medical therapies.
4. Astrophysics and their impact on human biology.
5. Current high-impact lifestyle/psychological/psycho-social/environmental issues (e.g. ageing, stress, sleep, circadian rhythms, infertility and electromagnetic field effects/nutrition from GM crops).

== Tourism and religion ==
With the craft and credibility from the film industry, Alex produced more than 220 documentaries ranging from World religion, education, tourism, Health systems and many other titles. He continued to work on projects for the Tourism of Kerala and other states during the 1990s. His notable works include the documentaries A Vision and Mission to Tirupati, 'Alphabet of life' and 'A Pilgrimage to Holy Sabarimala'. It was one of the few documentaries screened in association with the National Film Development Corporation of India (NFDC) festival. Alex conducted a global tour with the support of the Union Department of Tourism. He helped organise the Nishagandhi Dance Festival, Kerala in 1992.

=== Culture ===
Apart from research and tourism, Alex was a propagator of the Sanskrit language. He was the president of Samskrita Bharati, Tamil Nadu (2005–2015). The organisation aims to democratise and popularise Sanskrit language by encouraging the use of simple Sanskrit in everyday conversational texts. Alex was also the Head of Sanskrit Academies and Research Institutes for the World Samskrit Book fair.

=== Alexonics ===
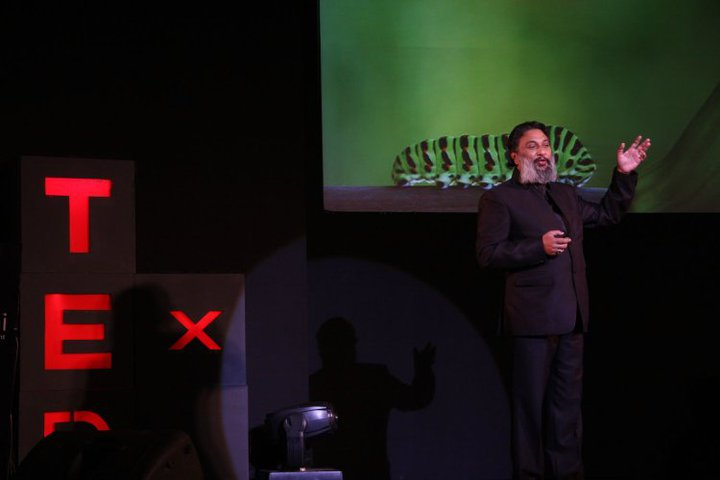
Dr.Alex giving a talk at TEDx Delhi

Dr. Alex had invented a unique custom made audio module called 'Alexonics'. Each module is produced according to an individual's astrological profile resulting in a 93,312 file database. The repeated listening to its vibrations can enhance and regulate the physiological as well as the psychological self. He had worked on this project with Late. Dr. Solomon Victor, Dr. A.P.J Abdul Kalam, Dr. B.M. Hegde and Dr. Sandeep, over a span of 25 years. With the ambition to spread world peace, Alex disseminated 'Alexonics' to a few world leaders and world pioneers. He was invited to deliver a talk on Alexonics for Ted.x at Delhi in 2010. The product will be available to the public soon.

=== Nakshatra paintings ===
Dr. Alex conceived a unique ideology to depict the 27 Nakshatras as the wives of the moon (Lord Chandra) in a set of 30 paintings, including those of the Sun god, Moon god and the Cosmic Serpent (Naga). The paintings are based on the Samhitas, Shastras, Vedas, Physics, Meta-physics, Astrophysics and Bio- physics. These are to be auctioned soon.

== Events ==
- He was the Judge for the Malayala Manorama's 3rd Annual Pookalam Festival along with his wife, Anitha Alex September 2005
- Chief guest of the World Sanskrit Day Function held in August 2008.
- Delivered a lecture on 'Good Health Today with Modern and Ancient Therapies' at the India Habitat Centre, May 2009
- Conducted a 28-day Agnihotra Yagna for World Peace in July 2009.
- Delivered a lecture on 'Impact of Triple Eclipses- Reality or Myth?' at the India Habitat Centre, Delhi. The event was organised by the Foundation of Peace, September 2009.
- Was invited as a speaker for TEDx.Delhi to talk on his custom made device "Alexonics" August 2010.
- Helped organise the World Samskrit Book Fair (Head of Sanskrit Academies and Research) in January 2011.

== Accolades ==
- Jury for the 50th National Film Awards, India (2003)
- Jury for the 58th National Film Awards, India (2011)
- Recipient of the 'Ambassador of Peace' award from the Universal Peace Federation
- Recipient of the 'Samskrita Mitra' award from the Government of India.

== Death ==
Dr. Alex died in Chennai on 23 June 2015, following a cardiac arrest. The Funeral was held at St.Paul's Orthodox Church at Kollad near Kottayam on 25 June. He is survived by his wife Anitha Alex and sons Dr. Alexander Mathew and Basil Mathew (Actor Tejas)

== Filmography (partial) ==
- 1986-Rajavinte Makan
- 1986-Rareeram
- 1987-Avalude Katha
- 1987-Thoovanathumbikal
- 1987-Kanikanum Neram
- 1987-Kottum Kuravayum
- 1988- Witness
- 1988- August 1
- 1990- Randam Varavu
- 1990- Parampara
- 1990- Vyooham
