= Kilukkam =

- Theatrical release poster
- Directed by: Priyadarshan
- Screenplay by: Venu Nagavalli
- Story by: Priyadarshan
- Based on: Roman Holiday by William Wyler
- Produced by: R. Mohan
- Starring: Mohanlal; Jagathy Sreekumar; Revathi; Thilakan; Innocent
- Cinematography: S. Kumar
- Edited by: N. Gopalakrishnan
- Music by: S. P. Venkatesh
- Production company: Goodknight Films
- Distributed by: Manorajyam Release
- Release date: 15 August 1991
- Running time: 156 minutes
- Country: India
- Language: Malayalam
- Budget: ₹60 lakh (US$62,000)
- Box office: ₹5 crore (US$520,000)

Kilukkam (transl. Jingle) is a 1991 Indian Malayalam-language comedy drama film directed by Priyadarshan and written by Venu Nagavalli. The story set in Ooty revolves around tourist guide Joji (Mohanlal) and photographer Nishchal (Jagathy Sreekumar). They happen to meet a lavish tourist Nandini (Revathi), whom they bet their fortunes on. It also stars Thilakan, Innocent, K. B. Ganesh Kumar, Sukumari, and Sharat Saxena, with Murali and Jagadish making cameo appearances. The music was composed by S. P. Venkatesh. Kilukkam was released on 15 August 1991. The film was the highest-grossing Malayalam film at that time and ran for more than 365 days in theaters. Kilukkam won five Kerala State Film Awards, including Best Actor for Mohanlal, Second Best Actor for Jagathy Sreekumar, Best Editor for N. Gopalakrishnan and Best Cinematographer for S. Kumar. The film is regarded as one of the best comedy films of Malayalam cinema. It was remade in Telugu as Allari Pilla and in Hindi as Muskurahat by Priyadarshan himself. Later, the film had a sequel Kilukkam Kilukilukkam (2006). The movie was reported to have been inspired by the 1953 American movie Roman Holiday.

== Synopsis ==
Joji is a down-on-his-luck tourist guide in Ootacamund. A series of events intertwines his life—and that of his friend Nischal—with Nandini, a mentally challenged tourist. Early in the movie, hilarity ensues through their misguided attempts to get rid of her. However, they soon discover that she is an escaped mental patient with a bounty on her safe return. Noticing that the reward keeps growing, they decide to hide her and wait for the payout to increase. To disguise her, they cut her long hair short. In time, they realize that things are not as they seem, and deeper complications unravel.

== Cast ==
- Mohanlal as Joji
- Jagathy Sreekumar as Nischal, Still Photographer and Joji's Friend
- Revathi as Nandini, Joji's Lover
- Thilakan as Justice Pillai
- Innocent as Kittunni, Pillai's House Servant
- Sharat Saxena as Samar Khan, a local goon
- Murali as Adv. Dasharathan, Nandini's Real Father and Pillai's Relative (Extended Cameo Appearance)
- Thikkurissy Sukumaran Nair as Tea Vendor Ambooty
- K. B. Ganesh Kumar as Ravi, Pillai's Son
- Sukumari as Doctor Aunty
- Devan as Rajendran, Pillai's Son-in-Law
- Zeenath as Thankam, School Teacher and Dasharathan's Wife
- Shyama as Pillai's Daughter and Rajendran's wife
- Santhosh as Bhairavan, Police Officer
- Ravi Menon as Aneesh, Pillai's Nephew
- Poojappura Ravi as Santhosh, Lottery Seller
- Kollam Thulasi as 'Pichathi' Muthu
- Krishnankutty Nair as Hari, School Peon
- T. P. Madhavan as Shekharan, Pillai's P.A.
- Nimmi Mohan as Justice Pillai's Wife
- Nandu as Rajappan, Pillai's Relative
- Suvarna Mathew as Neha, Pillai's Niece
- K. G. Devakiyamma as Aged Lady at Dhobi Ghat
- Ajayan Adoor as Hotel Manager Narayanankutty
- Antony Perumbavoor as Driver Antony
- Jagadish as Photographer (cameo appearance)
- Shyam Mohan (child artist)

== Production ==
=== Pre-production ===
The initial plan for the film was set when Priyadarshan met "Goodknight" Mohan in an airport. The story was developed by Priyadarshan from a thought which came to his mind, about a mentally-ill mischievous girl who is saved by a poor guy. Priyadarshan employed Venu Nagavally for screenwriting the film. The film's title was chosen as Kilukkam, since the character of Nandini is introduced in the film with the clink of her anglets when she jump off a train and she is all perky like a kilukkampetti (a toy box that makes clinking sound). The story of a girl who has to face some miseries in her life—it was the idea Priyadarshan initially intended for the film. While working on the story he met director Fazil and discussed the idea. Fazil at the time was directing Ente Sooryaputhrikku (1991). He told Priyadarshan to "reverse think" the story of Ente Sooryaputhrikku, which was about a girl trying to find her mother. And in Kilukkam it became, a girl trying to find her father.

Mohanlal, who is the usual choice of Priyadarshan was the protagonist in mind from the initial stage itself. Amala who was acting in Priyadarshan's Telugu film Nirnayam at the time, was signed for the role of Nandini. She gave dates from 3 March 1991 to 4 April. Priyadarshan's initial chose for Nischal was Sreenivasan, but he was unavailable during his scheduled date due to another commitment. Hence, Priyadarshan opted for Jagathy Sreekumar, to whom he asked 30 days continuous dates. Sreekumar, at the time, busy acting in multiple films at a time, gave his continuous dates for a long period for the first time. The film's pooja function was held at Kothandapani Studio in Madras (now Chennai). The recording of songs started at the same day in the studio by S. P. Venkatesh. By the time of commencement of filming, Amala got married and had to opt out from the film as her father-in-law Akkineni Nageswara Rao announced her retirement soon after that. She was replaced by Revathi. Jagadish played a pivotal character in the film as a still photographer, the professional rivalry of Nischal, but in the final cut of the film, his portions were cut short to a minor role for reducing the running time.

=== Filming ===
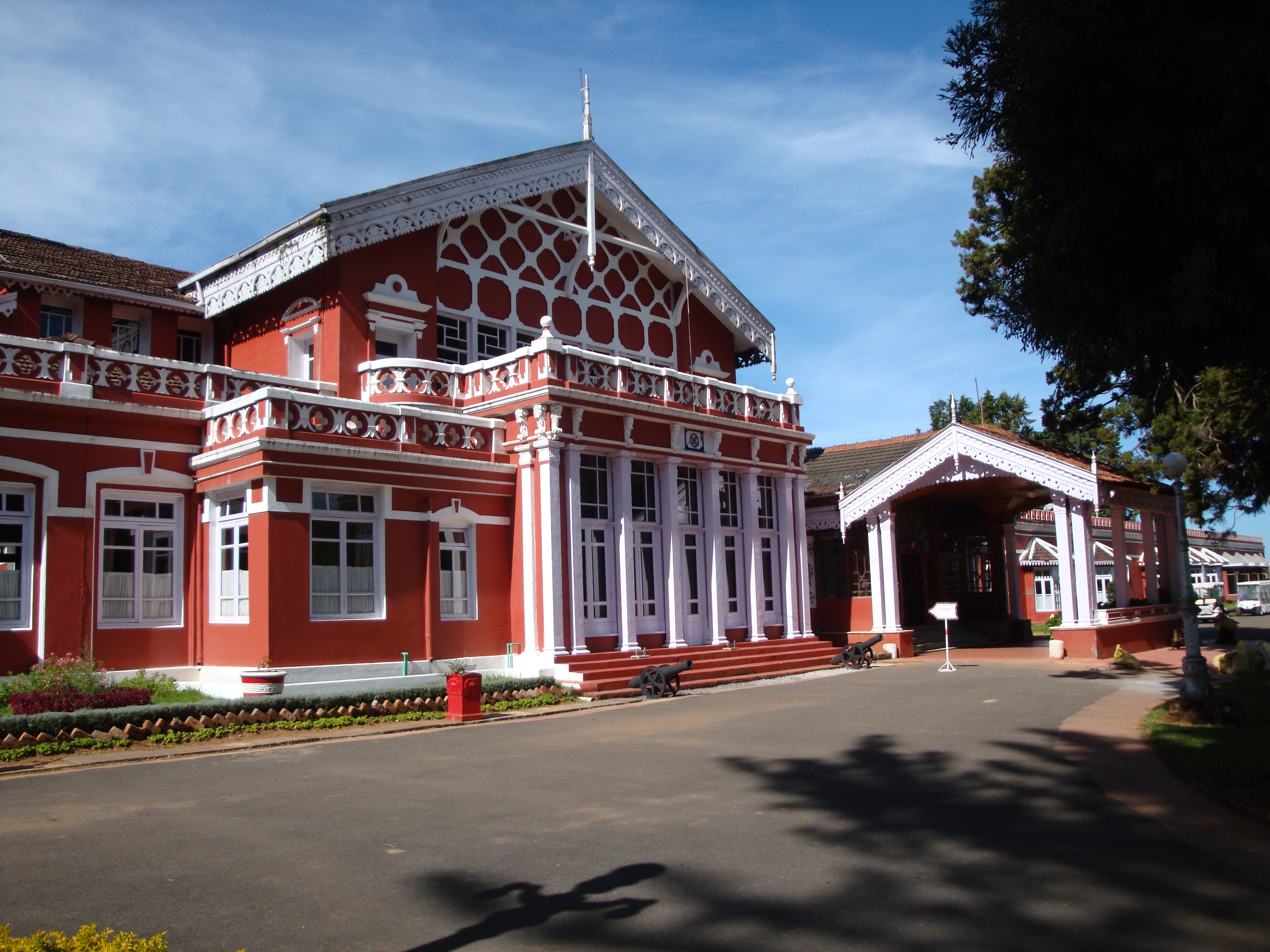
The Fernhills Palace in Ooty was a major location. It was shot as Justice Pillai's bungalow.

Principal photography began on 5 March 1991 in Ooty, which was the main location where the film is set. In Ooty, The Fernhills Palace was the central location, which was shot as the bungalow of Justice Pillai, played by Thilakan. The mist is utilised in the film to the maximum. The major part of the filming took place early in the morning because the mist lasted for a couple of hours only and the makers wanted to capitalise the mist-covered location. One of the initial scenes in the film, where Mohanlal and Thilakan take morning walks, was shot in a secluded location in Ooty that was accidentally discovered by the team. They wanted the place to look classy and so the lamp post, a couple of chairs and all those fallen leaves. They painted leaves were brought to the location in a lorry and were scattered to resemble natural foliage.

While filming the song "Ootyppattanam", Mohanlal escaped from what would have been a fatal injury. A sequence in the song was shot over the top of a moving train, where Mohanlal was standing opposite Jagathi and Revathy. There was a leaning electric line over the train passage, which the production team did not notice. While performing, all of a sudden, Sreekumar instructed Mohanlal to lie low, which he immediately obeyed without questioning. The line just touched his hair. In a later interview, Priyadarshan said that, he never laughed while filming Kilukkam, he believed that if they laugh in the sets, the audience will not get that laugh in theatres. Several unscripted dialogues were used by Mohanlal and Revathi in their combination scenes.

== Reception ==
Kilukkam was released on 15 August 1991, in 32 centers in Kerala. Within 50 days, it grossed ₹0.23 crore from the releasing centers. The film grossed ₹1.59 crores from theatricals and became the first Malayalam film to gross more than ₹1 crore from theatricals alone. Kilukkam went on to become the highest-grossing Malayalam film of the year 1991 and was for a time the highest grossing Malayalam film of all time.

In a later interview, Priyadarshan said that he exploited the Mohanlal – Sreekumar chemistry to the maximum and incorporated certain elements of emotions in the film unlike in his earlier comedy films Aram + Aram = Kinnaram (1985) and Boeing Boeing (1985), which was one of the reasons the film was a huge success at the box office.

The producer, Goodknight Mohan, in an interview with Safari TV in 2021 revealed that the budget of Kilukkam was around ₹0.60 crore at that time when Malayalam films were usually made with a cost of ₹0.02 to ₹0.03 crore. He expressed his concerns with Priyadarshan about whether the film would be a success or not. But the film went on to become the highest grossing Malayalam film at that time with a total gross of ₹5 crore. The film ran for over a year in 2 release theaters. Kilukkam has over the years attained a cult status. The film is often regarded as a classic, it is considered one of the best comedy films ever made in Malayalam cinema. The film receives regular re-runs on television and is the most telecasted film in Malayalam film history.

== Music ==
Kilukkam

Soundtrack album by S. P. Venkatesh
- Released: 15 March 1991
- Recorded: March 1991
- Studios: Kothandapani Studio, Madras
- Length: 18:17
- Language: Malayalam
- Label: Millennium Audios
- Producer: R. Mohan

S. P. Venkatesh chronology
| Koodikazhcha (1991) | Kilukkam (1991) | Naadody (1992) |

All lyrics are written by Bichu Thirumala; all music is composed by S. P. Venkatesh.

Kilukkam (Original Motion Picture Soundtrack)
| No. | Title | Artist(s) | Length |
|---|---|---|---|
| 1. | "Kilukil Pamparam" | M. G. Sreekumar | 04:41 |
| 2. | "Ootypattanam" | S. P. Balasubrahmaniam, M. G. Sreekumar, K. S. Chithra | 04:46 |
| 3. | "Meena Venalil" | M. G. Sreekumar, K. S. Chithra | 04:28 |
| 4. | "Panineer Chandrike" | M. G. Sreekumar | 05:02 |
| Total length: | | | 18:17 |

== Accolades ==
Kerala State Film Awards

- Best Actor - Mohanlal
- Second Best Actor - Jagathy Sreekumar
- Best Playback Singer (Male) - M. G. Sreekumar
- Best Cinematographer - S. Kumar
- Best Editor - N. Gopalakrishnan

Kerala Film Critics Award

- Best Popular Film
- Best Art Director - Krishnankutty
- Special Jury Award - Jagathy Sreekumar

Cinema Express Awards

- Best Director (Malayalam) - Priyadarshan
- Best Actress (Malayalam) - Revathi

== 3D conversion ==
In 2012, the executives of Ultra Rays 3D Technologies Private Ltd in Kochi approached Priyadarshan and Ram Mohan for talks for the 3D conversion of Kilukkam. In that case, Kilukkam would become the first Malayalam film to be converted into 3D. Priyadarshan confirmed the news that the company approached him but the final call should be made by the producer Ram Mohan. In the Times of India report in late 2012, Mohan said that nothing has been finalised, discussions are going on.
