= Makkal En Pakkam =

1987 film by Karthick Raghunath

- Theatrical release poster
- Directed by: Karthick Raghunath
- Story by: Rajeev
- Based on: Rajavinte Makan by Thampi Kannanthanam
- Produced by: Suresh Balaje
- Starring: Sathyaraj; Ambika; Rajesh
- Cinematography: Ashok Chowdhry
- Edited by: P. Vasu
- Music by: Chandrabose
- Production company: Suresh Arts
- Release date: 14 April 1987
- Country: India
- Language: Tamil

Makkal En Pakkam (transl. People are on my side) is a 1987 Indian Tamil-language gangster action film directed by Karthik Raghunath. The film stars Sathyaraj, Rajesh, and Ambika. It is a remake of the 1986 Malayalam film Rajavinte Makan. The film was released on 14 April 1987.

== Plot ==
Samraj and Rajmohan are good friends who become enemies due to a false theft accusation on Samraj. Rajmohan becomes a great political leader whereas Samraj becomes a great smuggler. With Rajmohan's political influence, Samraj smuggling business was affected. Radha, Rajmohan's girlfriend, works as a junior assistant for his friend who hands an important file to her. It contains details on Samraj's illegal business. Knowing this, Samraj tries to retrieve the file, only to get Radha in trouble. When Samraj realises that she is in trouble he tries to help and consecutively falls in love with her. Radha lets Samraj know that she has a child by Rajmohan and that affair was unofficial.

Police officials respond to the order of Rajmohan and try to arrest Samraj. He escapes most occasions and continues to be king of smugglers. Finally when Rajmohan attempts to revenge Samraj, Samraj close friends Michael and Ramesh get killed. Samraj becomes extremely ferocious and chases Rajmohan at his residence with firearms, kills plenty of his party men, but hesitates to kill Rajmohan as Radha intercepts.

The film has two ends. One in which a police officer kills Samraj and another in which Radha kills Rajmohan after Samraj is dead. Both climaxes were well received by the audience.

== Cast ==
- Sathyaraj as Samraj
- Ambika as Radha
- Rajesh as Rajmohan
- Nagesh as Chari
- Nizhalgal Ravi as Michael
- Raghuvaran as Ramesh
- Master Srikanth
- M. K. Muthu as Rajmohan's rowdy
- Babu Antony as the kidnapper
- Janagaraj
- Manorama as Vasanthamala
- Alex Mathew
- M. S. Bhaskar
- V.Gopalakrishnan
- Kallapetti Singaram

== Production ==
In the 1970s, M. G. Ramachandran was due to star in a film titled Makkal En Pakkam, but the project was dropped after he quit the film industry to enter politics. In early 1987, producer K. Balaji launched a film with the same name starring Sathyaraj, which was a remake of the Malayalam film Rajavinte Makan (1986), itself inspired by Sidney Sheldon's novel Rage of Angels (1980). Alex Mathew, who appeared as a student leader in the Malayalam film, reprised his role in the Tamil remake. Sathyaraj said he accepted to act in the film because it was a remake of a successful film, and was guaranteed to do well. Makkal En Pakkam, like a previous Sathyaraj film Palaivana Rojakkal (1986), was made with political overtones.

== Soundtrack ==
The music was composed by Chandrabose, with lyrics by Vairamuthu.

Track listing
No.	Title	Singer(s)	Length
1.	"Kongu Nadu Thangam Ada"	S. P. Balasubrahmanyam	4:35
2.	"Maane Pon Maane Vilaiyada"	S. Janaki	4:06
3.	"Andavanai Paarkanum Avanukku"	S. P. Balasubrahmanyam	4:33
4.	"Panchangam Yeanga"	S. P. Balasubrahmanyam, S. Janaki	4:23
Total length:			17:37

== Release and reception ==
Makkal En Pakkam was released on 14 April 1987. The following week, N. Krishnaswamy of The Indian Express wrote, "The film has enough 'dhum' to keep lay viewers happy" and praised the performances of Sathyaraj and Rajesh. Jayamanmadhan of Kalki criticised the film for its inconsistent tone.
