= Manithanin Marupakkam =

1986 Indian crime thriller film

- Theatrical release poster
- Directed by: K. Rangaraj
- Written by: A. L. Narayanan (dialogues)
- Story by: Dennis Joseph
- Produced by: T. G. Thyagarajan; G. Saravanan
- Starring: Sivakumar; Radha; Jayashree; Jai Jagadish
- Cinematography: Dinesh Baboo
- Edited by: K. R. Krishnan
- Music by: Ilaiyaraaja
- Production company: Sathya Jyothi Films
- Release date: 25 July 1986
- Country: India
- Language: Tamil

Manithanin Marupakkam (transl. The other side of mankind) is a 1986 Indian Tamil-language crime thriller film, directed by K. Rangaraj and produced by T. G. Thyagarajan and G. Saravanan of Sathya Jyothi Films. The film stars Sivakumar, Radha, Jayashree and Jai Jagadish. A remake of the Malayalam film Nirakkoottu, it revolves around Ravi Varma (Sivakumar), who is sentenced to death for murdering his wife Kala (Radha), telling his story to his wife's sister Sujatha (Jayashree), a news reporter, about the true story of what happened. The film was released on 25 July 1986. The film's producer and director simultaneously made a Kannada remake of this film titled Sathya Jyothi in the same year.

== Plot ==
Sujatha joins as a news reporter in a Tamil daily named Dhinakkural. She is assigned to interview Ravi Varma, who has been sentenced to death for the murder of his wife Kala, who is Sujatha's sister. The Supreme Court had sentenced Ravi to death and president also rejected Ravi's appeal. Sujatha covers and publishes the story of Ravi Varma and is well acclaimed and appreciated by owner, her boss, during the official meeting. They were also surprised on a feedback letter that had reached Dhinakkural office regarding the published article.

Ravi Varma is a wealthy man and the owner of an advertising agency. Kala was employed as a clerk in a firm, and is a classical dancer too. Ravi had met Kala during a dance program hosted at the club. He had then proposed with an offer for Kala join his advertising agency as a model, which Kala rejects instantly. However, on losing her job as a clerk and her family (consisting of an ill ridden father, a younger sister and brother) being dependent on her income, she is forced to join Ravi's advertising agency. The advertising agency flourishes well with the utilisation of Kala's modelling skills. A carrier oriented Ravi, in order to make Kala stay with his firm always, proposes to Kala and they get register married.

After a week long honeymoon, Ravi force his wife to pose for modelling with a half-dressed costume, which Kala couldn't accept. This leads to indifference in their family life. Once Ravi learns that his wife is pregnant, argument begins again regarding the fatherhood of the conceived child, and Ravi asks his wife to move out of his house. Kala then takes shelter in her friend, Dr. Saradha's house. Divorce was filed by Ravi, and it was granted with the verdict that Ravi needs to compensate his wife and child on a monthly basis until the child becomes youth. A frustrated Ravi visits Kala and tells her that he will pay all the compensation for a single time and brutally murders her with the knife he brought with him.

A day before his scheduled execution, Ravi Varma escapes prison, and accidentally meets Sujatha. He learns that Sujatha and Kala are sisters and informs the truth. Ravi loved Kala a lot and never pressured her for any modelling assignments. Arjun used to blackmail Kala, by showing Kala's nude photographs which he had clicked. Fearing social stigma Kala divorces Ravi unwillingly. Arjun later tries to molest Kala, kills her and flees. Since Ravi was on the murder spot he is taken into custody by the police.

To avenge the same Ravi escapes from the prison and kills Arjun.

== Cast ==
- Sivakumar as Ravi Varma
- Radha as Kala
- Jayashree as Sujatha
- Jai Jagadish as Arjun
- Rajyalakshmi as Saradha
- V. K. Ramasamy as Dhinkkural office owner
- Vennira Aadai Moorthy as Kalamegam
- Delhi Ganesh
- A. R. S. as Inspector

== Production ==
The film's title had been taken from a separate uncompleted film directed by K. Balachander starring Rajinikanth. This was Sivakumar's 150th film as an actor. The film was launched alongside song recording at Prasad Theatre in February 1986. A scene featuring Jayashree and Rajalakshmi was shot at Revathi Cine Studios. A scene featuring Sivakumar and Radha was shot at Ragam bungalow at Annanagar. It remained the only film to be shot at Parappana Agrahara Central Prison.

== Soundtrack ==
The music was composed by Ilaiyaraaja.

Song	Singers	Lyrics	Length
"Santhosam Indru"	K. S. Chithra	Vairamuthu	04.21
"Kannanai Kanpaya"	K. S. Chithra	Na. Kamarasan	03:58
"Oomai Nenjin Sontham"	K. J. Yesudas	Vairamuthu	02:50
"Kallukkulle"	S. P. Balasubrahmanyam, S. Janaki	Pulamaipithan	04.24

== Critical reception ==
Jayamanmadhan of Kalki said the film proved that the combination of a different story and perfect screenplay would make the director's job easy, and also appreciated the cast performances. Balumani of Anna praised the acting, music, cinematography and direction.
