= Chukkan =

- Directed by: Thampi Kannanthanam
- Written by: Babu Pallassery
- Screenplay by: Babu Pallassery
- Produced by: Thampi Kannanthanam
- Starring: Suresh Gopi; Gautami; Thilakan; Kaviyoor Ponnamma
- Cinematography: Ravi K. Chandran
- Edited by: K. Narayanan
- Music by: S. P. Venkatesh
- Production company: Julia Productions
- Distributed by: Julia Productions
- Release date: 1994
- Country: India
- Language: Malayalam

Chukkan is a 1994 Indian Malayalam-language film, directed and produced by Thampi Kannanthanam. This film became famous later for Suresh Gopi's signature dance moves. The film stars Suresh Gopi, Gautami, Thilakan and Kaviyoor Ponnamma.

== Synopsis ==
Gaurishankar is an unemployed youth, who gets spirited by environmental issues a factory causes. However, those who supported him for the cause had ulterior motives. His father Shnkaran Nair is the sole breadwinner of the family and he works with the factory, and Gauri's actions costs him dearly. Gauri after understanding that he was fooled by greedy politicians and their masters, a capitalist known as Mr.X plays their dirty game as a team player only to betray them later.

== Cast ==
- Suresh Gopi as Gaurishankar
- Gautami as Gayathri, Gaurishankar's love interest
- Thilakan as Shankaran Nair
- Jagathy Sreekumar as Sreeraman
- M. G. Soman as Parol Padmanabhan
- Narendra Prasad as Mahendran
- Rajan P. Dev as Iyer
- N. F. Varghese as Chandran
- Jose Prakash as Narayanan
- Vijayaraghavan as Sreenivasan
- Kaviyoor Ponnamma as Gourishankar's Mother
- Bobby Kottarakkara
- Baiju as Vikky/Vigneshwaran
- Kundara Johny as Ganapathy
- Kuthiravattam Pappu as Beeranikka
- Riza Bava as Viswan
- Shanthakumary
- Renuka as Leela
- Sabitha Anand as Sindhu
- Jose Pellissery as Manjooran
- Pala Aravindan as Krishnanunni
- Seena Antony as Ammu

== Box office ==
The film was commercial success at the Kerala box office.

== Soundtrack ==
The music was composed by S. P. Venkatesh.

No.	Song	Singers	Lyrics	Length (m:ss)
1	"Anthimaanam"	K. J. Yesudas, K. S. Chithra	O. N. V. Kurup	
2	"Iniyaathra"	K. J. Yesudas	O. N. V. Kurup	
3	"Malaramban"	K. J. Yesudas, K. S. Chithra	O. N. V. Kurup	
4	"Thalathil"	K. J. Yesudas	O. N. V. Kurup	
