= Puthariyankam =

1978 film directed by P. G. Viswambharan

- Directed by: P. G. Vishwambharan
- Written by: Purushan Alappuzha
- Screenplay by: Purushan Alappuzha
- Starring: Vincent; Sudheer; Unnimary; Poojappura Ravi; Seema
- Cinematography: Anandakkuttan
- Edited by: N. P. Suresh
- Music by: A. T. Ummer
- Production company: Umamini Movies
- Distributed by: Jubilee Productions
- Release date: 21 July 1978
- Country: India
- Language: Malayalam

Puthariyankam is a 1978 Indian Malayalam film, directed by P. G. Vishwambharan. The film stars Vincent, Sudheer, Roja Ramani, Unnimary, Poojappura Ravi and Seema in the lead roles. The film's musical score was composed by A. T. Ummer. Its last three reels were shot in Eastman Colour.

== Cast ==
- Sudheer
- Vincent
- Unnimary
- Seema
- Shobhana
- Vijayalalitha
- Sreelatha Namboothiri
- Poojappura Ravi

== Soundtrack ==
The music was composed by A. T. Ummer and the lyrics were written by Yusufali Kechery.

No.	Song	Singers	Lyrics	Length (m:ss)
1	"Aarum Kothikkunna Poove"	B. Vasantha, Gopalakrishnan	Yusufali Kechery	
2	"Aathiraponnoonjaal"	Ambili, Chorus, Jolly Abraham	Yusufali Kechery	
3	"Chanchalaakshimaare"	Sujatha Mohan	Yusufali Kechery	
4	"Kaalidaasa Kavyamo"	K. J. Yesudas	Yusufali Kechery	
