= Maanthrikam =

- Directed by: Thampi Kannanthanam
- Written by: Babu Pallassery
- Produced by: Thampi Kannanthanam
- Starring: Mohanlal; Raghuvaran; Jagadish; Priya Raman; Hemanth Ravan
- Cinematography: Saloo George
- Edited by: A. Sreekar Prasad
- Music by: S. P. Venkatesh
- Production company: Juliya Productions
- Distributed by: Juliya Pictures Release
- Release date: 5 September 1995
- Country: India
- Language: Malayalam
- Budget: ₹3 crores

Maanthrikam (transl. Magical) is a 1995 Indian Malayalam-language action comedy film produced and directed by Thampi Kannanthanam and written by Babu Pallassery. It stars Mohanlal, Jagadish, Raghuvaran, Priya Raman, Hemanth Ravan and Rajan P. Dev. Filmed by Saloo George and edited by A. Sreekar Prasad; S. P. Venkatesh provided the music. The film was dubbed in Tamil as Raanuvam and in Telugu as Army Commander. It marked the Malayalam debut of actress Vineetha.

== Plot ==
A senior scientist of missile technology designs a state of the art missile "Samhaara"and he is abducted along with his family by a terrorist group. A military officer and his assistant are tasked to rescue the scientist. They join a gypsy performing art group in disguise and reach a fictitious town and a girl get attracted to the officer. He get involved with the sister of the assistant of terrorist group leader to execute the mission. In a twist it is revealed that the main girl dancer of the gypsy group is an officer appointed by military chief to track officer, who is suspected of double crossing. Finally every thing get resolved and the scientist is rescued unhurt with safety of Samhaara know-how and the hero takes his lady love with him. Mohanlal simply excels as a comedian, lover, military officer, magician and dancer with 3 heroines.

== Cast ==
- Mohanlal as Alby / Maj. Stephen Ronald, Indian Military Intelligence
- Jagadish as Jobi D'Costa / Subedar Teddy Lopez, Indian Military Intelligence
- Raghuvaran as Dr. Abdul Rahiman, scientist in ISRO
- Priya Raman as Betty Fernadez
- Vineetha as Menaka/Lt. Diana, Indian Military Intelligence
- Vaishnavi as Shakeela Abdul Rahman
- Hemanth Ravan as Gonsalves
- Rajan P. Dev as Antonio
- Madhupal as Willy
- Krishnakumar as Douglas
- Mitra Joshi as Catherine, Willy & Douglas's sister
- Sreenath as Col. Raveendran
- Ravi Menon as Father Thaliyath
- Ajith Kollam as Freddy
- Santhosh as Beeran
- Vinayakan as Michael Jackson imitator, his movie debut
- Maria Gorettiz

== Production ==
Lal Jose was the associate director of Thampi Kannanthanam in the film. Madras (now Chennai) was a filming location. Maanthrikam marked the film debut of Vinayakan, who appeared as a member of a gypsy dance group, he apparently imitates and wears the attire of Michael Jackson. For the role, Vinayakan was referred to Kannanthanam by Lal Jose, who spotted him during a dance performance in Kochi. Made on a budget of ₹3 crores, major locations of the movie were MGR Film City, Kishkinda Water Park, Chidambaram and Pichavaram. The magic sequences which Mohanlal performed was taught by magician R. K. Malayath.

== Soundtrack ==
S. P. Venkatesh composed the music for the movie for which the lyrics were written by O. N. V. Kurup. The songs were distributed by Ankit Audios.

Maanthrikam (Original Motion Picture Soundtrack)
No.	Title	Singer(s)	Length
1.	"Mohikkum Neelmizhi"	K. J. Yesudas, K. S. Chithra	5:42
2.	"Keli Vipinam"	Biju Narayanan	5:06
3.	"Dhim Dhim Dheemi Dheemi (movie version)"	M. G. Sreekumar, Alex	5:03
4.	"Keli Vipinam"	K. S. Chithra	5:06
5.	"Dhim Dhim Dheemi Dheemi (audio cd/cassette version)"	M. G. Sreekumar	5:03

== Reception ==
Mohanlal had expressed doubts about the film doing well at the box office due to the unworldly stunts performed in the film. However, Kannanthanam assured him that the film would be a hit.
