= Manu Uncle =

- Poster designed by Gayathri Ashokan
- Directed by: Dennis Joseph
- Screenplay by: Shibu Chakravarthy
- Story by: Dennis Joseph
- Produced by: Joy Thomas
- Starring: Mammootty; Mohanlal; Suresh Gopi; M. G. Soman; Prathapachandran; Lissy; B. Thyagarajan
- Cinematography: Jayanan Vincent
- Edited by: K. Shankunny
- Music by: Shyam
- Production company: Jubilee Productions
- Distributed by: Jubilee Productions
- Release date: 7 April 1988
- Country: India
- Language: Malayalam

Manu Uncle is a 1988 Indian Malayalam-language comedy-drama film with children as main characters directed by Dennis Joseph and produced by Joy Thomas. Starring Mammootty, M. G. Soman, Prathapachandran, Lissy, and B. Thyagarajan. Mohanlal made a cameo appearance as himself. The film was theatrically released on 7 April 1988 and was a box office success, completing a 100-day run in theatres. The movie was filmed in Kollam and Trivandrum districts. The film won a National Award for Best Children's Film. Suresh Gopi also appeared in a cameo role, playing the character S.I Minnal Prathapan. The character eventually developed a cult following several years after the release of the film.

== Plot ==
Manu is a Kollam-based astronomy researcher whose father is a police officer, and Ravunni, an exporter, is their family friend. His neighbors, Antony and Mary, have two children: Dany (a.k.a. Lother) and Ikru. When Manu's elder sister's children arrive from Delhi for their vacation, they team up with Dany and Ikru to form a four-member group led by Dany. Together, the children enjoy their holiday by sightseeing, pulling a prank on Manu, and even having a chance encounter with actor Mohanlal.

One day, the children happen to visit the Art Museum at the very same time when Marthanda Varma's Crown is stolen. Ikru noticed the robbers, Gomez, Appu and Kittu but was not able to describe them to his Grandpa. Manu, who has a well-equipped communication system, is able to listen to a conversation between Kittu and Gomez planning to loot Marthanda Varma's Sword. Manu informs his father about the plan, and they both rush to Padmanabhapuram Palace. Gomez, meanwhile already gets hold of the sword and while escaping the palace encounters Manu and his father. A fight follows in which Manu is injured by Gomez; now Manu's father is in pursuit of the robbers alone. But the robbers kill Manu's father in a planned lorry accident. The viewers are now able to figure out the mastermind behind the robbery is; Ravunni, the family friend. Unfortunately for him though, the incident was witnessed by Khader, a young orphan who happened to be in that lorry. The robbers try to catch the boy, but the boy manages to escape from them and in the process ends up meeting the four children, and tells them that their Grandpa was not dead in an accident but was killed.

The curious children decide to investigate the murder. While intercepting a portable radio conversation between Gomez and Ravunni, the latter discloses his identity to Manu. Ravunni threatens Manu to stay away from his illegal export activities and warns Manu that, he will meet his father's fate. Ikru who had already met Gomez drew his picture which is noticed by Manu and Ravunni. Ravunni gets shocked seeing the drawing and Manu decides to garner more information about Ravunni after watching his tensed face. Manu breaks into Ravunni's house and validates his doubts. The children meanwhile decide to venture to the gang's hideout as per the directions from Khader. They are shocked on realising that it was Ravunni leading the gang. The gang sees the children who crossed their fence and Ravunni directs his men to kill them. But soon, Manu reaches there and saves the children with help from SI Minnal Prathapan, a bumbling but good intentioned policeman. The movie ends with the robbers getting arrested by the police.

== Cast ==
- Mammootty as Manu, an aspiring scientist
- Kuriyan Chakko as Dany a.k.a. Lother
- Amit as Ikru
- Anoop C. Parameswaran as Shanku
- Sonia as Renu
- Sandeep as Khader
- Lissy as Uma, Manu's Sister
- M. G. Soman as DYSP, Manu's Father
- Prathapachandran as Ravunni, Manu's Family Friend
- R. Thyagarajan as Gomez, Ravunni's Partner
- K. P. A. C. Azeez as Antony, Dany's and Ikru's Father
- K. P. A. C. Lalitha as Mary, Dany's and Ikru's Mother
- Murali Menon as Kittu
- Mohan Jose as Security Guard at Ravunni's house
- Jalaja as Manu's Elder Sister
- Mohanlal as Himself (cameo appearance)
- Suresh Gopi as SI 'Minnal' Prathapan (cameo Appearance)

== Crew ==
- Story and Direction ..... Dennis Joseph
- Screenplay, Dialogues and Lyrics .... Shibu Chakravarthy
- Producer .... Joy Thomas
- Distribution .... Jubilee Productions
- Cinematography .... Jayanan Vincent
- Editor .... K. Shankunny
- Stunt .... A. R. Basha
- Art Direction .... Sabu Pravadas
- Associate Direction .... Jimmy
- P. R. O. .... Ranji Kottayam
- Stills .... R. Sukumar
- Make up .... Thomas
- Costume Design .... Kumar

== Awards ==
- Won - National Film Award for Best Children's Film
- Won - Kerala State Film Award for Best Children's Film

== Soundtrack ==
Composer: Shyam; Lyricist: Shibu Chakravarthy

- "Mele Veettile" .... K. S. Chithra
- "Oru Kili" .... K. S. Chithra & M. G. Sreekumar

== Trivia ==
Jagathy Sreekumar was originally cast to play the role of SI 'Minnal' Prathapan, but he could not reach the location on time because of other commitments during that time. Aliens, E.T. the Extra-Terrestrial & Close Encounters of the Third Kind were cited in this movie as a comparison to Manu's encounter with a cockroach through the telescope.
