= Rareeram =

Raariram
- Directed by: Sibi Malayil
- Written by: Appukuttan; K. N. Menon; Perumpadavam Sreedharan (dialogues)
- Screenplay by: Perumpadavam Sreedharan
- Produced by: Jagan Appachan
- Starring: Mammootty; Shobhana; Thilakan; Nedumudi Venu
- Cinematography: Anandakuttan
- Edited by: V. P. Krishnan
- Music by: Songs: Kodakara Madhavan; Score: S. P. Venkatesh
- Production company: Jagan Pictures
- Distributed by: Jagan Pictures
- Release date: 19 December 1986
- Country: India
- Language: Malayalam

Rareeram (transl. Lullaby) is a 1986 Indian Malayalam film, directed by Sibi Malayil and produced by Appachan. The film stars Mammootty, Shobhana, Nedumudi Venu and Geetha in the lead roles. The film had songs by Kodakara Madhavan.

== Cast ==
- Mammootty as Nandakumar
- Shobhana as Meera
- Nedumudi Venu as Venu
- Geetha as Radha
- Geetu Mohandas as Geethu
- Rohini as Chitra
- Thilakan as Dr. Tharakan
- Innocent as Lonappan
- Sukumari as Soudamini
- Unnimary as Padmavathi
- Aranmula Ponnamma
- Mamukkoya as Koya
- Mala Aravindan as Aravindakshan Nair
- T. P. Madhavan as Man at the Bank
- Philomina as Sister
- Alex Mathew as bank employee

== Soundtrack ==
The music was composed by Kodakara Madhavan and the lyrics were written by O. N. V. Kurup.

No.	Song	Singers	Lyrics	Length (m:ss)
1	"Mandaara Pushpangal"	K. S. Chithra	O. N. V. Kurup	
2	"Raareram Raro"	K. J. Yesudas	O. N. V. Kurup	
