= Parampara (1990 film) =

- Directed by: Sibi Malayil
- Written by: S. N. Swamy
- Screenplay by: S. N. Swamy
- Story by: S. N. Swamy
- Starring: Mammootty; Suresh Gopi; Sumalatha
- Cinematography: Anandakuttan
- Edited by: L. Bhoominathan
- Music by: Mohan Sitara
- Release date: 20 December 1990
- Country: India
- Language: Malayalam

Parampara (transl. Succession) is a 1990 Malayalam film, directed by Sibi Malayil, written by S. N. Swamy, and starring Mammootty, Suresh Gopi and Sumalatha. Mammootty plays two roles in the film, portraying both Johnny, the protagonist, and Lawrence, his father. The film was a commercial failure. The film's story was developed by Swamy on the suggestion of Mammootty after watching an English film. The film was loosely remade in Hindi as Phool Aur Kaante (1991) and in Telugu as Varasudu (1993), both of which were commercial successes.

== Plot ==
When his son is kidnapped by a rival gang, Johnny teams up with his estranged father, Lawrence (Johnny's mother was murdered by his father's enemies) to rescue the kidnapped child.

== Cast ==
- Mammootty in a dual role as:
  - Lawrence (Father)
  - Johnny (Son)
- Suresh Gopi as Chandu
- Sumalatha as Meera
- Malaysia Vasudevan as Kaliyappa Chettiyar
- Kuthiravattam Pappu as Achuthan
- Sathaar as SI Santhosh
- M. S. Thripunithura as Meera's father
- Deepak as Joemon, Johnny's son
- Chithra as Mary, Lawrence's wife
- Alex Mathew

== Soundtrack ==
The soundtrack album was composed by Mohan Sithara and the lyrics were written by Kaithapram and Sreekumaran Thampi.

Track	Song title	Singer(s)
1	Onnam Maanam	G. Venugopal
2	Kolakkuruvi	K. S. Chithra
3	Onnam Maanam	G. Venugopal

== View the film ==
- parampara
