= Paithrukam =

- Directed by: Jayaraaj
- Screenplay by: Kaloor Dennis
- Story by: George Vettam
- Produced by: B.Sreekantan Varkala
- Starring: Suresh Gopi; Narendra Prasad; Jayaram; Maniyanpilla Raju; Geetha; Padmini
- Cinematography: S. Kumar
- Edited by: B. Lenin; V. T. Vijayan
- Music by: S. P. Venkatesh
- Distributed by: Simple Pictures
- Release date: 23 April 1993
- Country: India
- Language: Malayalam

Paithrukam (Heritage) is a 1993 Indian Malayalam-language drama film, directed by Jayaraaj, starring Suresh Gopi, Narendra Prasad, and Jayaram. Scripted by Kaloor Dennis, this film revolves around a traditional Brahmin family and the fight between their beliefs and atheism.

== Plot ==
Devadathan Chemmathiripadu, a Vedic scholar, is widely respected. He successfully completed Somayagam. Leading a simple life away from all the chaos, Devadathan has two sons, Somadathan and Chithrabhanu. Somadathan leaves for Delhi to become a journalist, and Chitrabhanu stays behind to assist his father. Bhanu Namboothiri is a chief priest in the nearby temple. During his Delhi days, Somadathan became interested in atheism and became associated with several radical groups. When he returns to his village to meet his family, he finds the daily rituals irritating and starts questioning them. He denounces Vedas as superstition and starts advocating atheism among the villagers.

In the beginning, Devadathan does not take it seriously. Slowly, he begins to find it unbearable. He advises Dathan to lead a Brahmin's life, to which Dathan shoots back that he is no longer a Brahmin and had given up his Yajnopavitam, long ago. This shocks Devadathan who asks him to stay away from his house. Dathan steps out of his house and marries Gayathri, another atheist and his lover. The couple, in their efforts to win out against superstition, decide to stay at an old haunted house, which people believe is dangerous. They along with fellow radicals clean up the place and destroy the idols of Nagas and the small worship place.

In the meantime, Bhanu Namboothiri falls in love with a girl in the neighboring village, Gouri. He requests his mom to speak about this to Devadathan. But, Devadathan reveals that Bhanu has several issues in his horoscope and at the age of 27, even his life could be in danger. This breaks him down, and he confirms this with another astrologer. He is heartbroken and breaks up with his girl. He commits suicide that night. However, Somadathan accuses his father for his brother's death, and his anger turns into hatred. Meanwhile, Gayathri gets pregnant twice, but both end up in miscarriage. The people cite the reason as Sarpadosha. She dreams of serpents and begins to believe their act of destroying the idols of Nagas was the reason for the miscarriages.

One evening, while returning home, Somadathan finds Gayathri lighting a lamp for the idols at a cleaned-up shrine, which infuriates him. She tries to justify her rationale and make him change his mind. But he stubbornly tells her that to stay with him, she needs to follow his principles. Gayathri storms out of the house and arrives at Devadathan's house. Somadathan's mother welcomes her and performs special pujas for her because she is pregnant for the third time. She then gives birth to a boy. Somadathan argues with Devadathan that he should not be brought up as a Brahmin and no Vedic rituals should be conducted for him.

In the meantime, a group of people arrives at Devadathan's house to perform an Athirathram, to please Lord Indra and for rain. Athirathram is the highest form of yaga, according to Vedas, and if performed perfectly, it will result in heavy rain. The stage is set and all preparations are in full swing. A group of atheists under the leadership of Somadathan decides to oppose it, exposing the meaninglessness of such rituals. He challenges Devadathan and asks him if no heavy rains fall, will he give up Vedas and accept atheism, to which Devadathan agrees. But he also puts forward another question to Dathan if it rains, will he be ready to follow his father's way, to which Dathan agrees. On the last day of Athirathram, it rains severely, and Dathan accepts defeat. Somyaji arrives at home and continues his meditation in his home's inner altar, and as an oblation sacrifices his life to the fire. Somadathan then takes up his father's path and becomes the next priest of the family.

== Cast ==
- Narendra Prasad as Devadathan Chemmathiripadu
- Suresh Gopi as Somadathan
- Jayaram as Chithrabhanu
- Maniyanpilla Raju
- Geetha as Gayathri
- Bobby Kottarakkara
- Hakim Rawther
- Nanditha Bose

== Soundtrack ==
Paithrukam

Soundtrack album by S. P. Venkatesh
- Released: 1993
- Genre: Soundtrack
- Label: Ranjini Cassettes; Satyam Audios

The acclaimed soundtrack of this movie was composed by S. P. Venkatesh for which the lyrics were penned by Kaithapram. All the songs of this movie were instant hits.

Track	Song title	Singer(s)	Other notes
1	"Vaalkannezhuthiya"	K. J. Yesudas	Raaga: Anandabhairavi
2	"Neelaanjana"	K. S. Chithra	
3	"Shivam Shivadagana"	K. J. Yesudas	Raaga: Subhapanthuvarali
4	"Seethakalyana"	K. J. Yesudas	Traditional Krithi by Tyagaraja; Raaga: Kurinji
5	"Neelakanda"	Kaithapram	Traditional Folk; Raaga: Samantha Malahari
6	"Swayamvaramaay"	K. J. Yesudas, Minmini	
7	"Vaalkkannezhuthiya"	K. S. Chithra	Raaga: Anandabhairavi
8	"Seethakalyana"	K. S. Chithra	Traditional Krithi by Tyagaraja; Raaga: Kurinji
9	"Neelaanjana"	Bombay Jayashri	

== Awards ==
- Kerala State Film Award for Best Lyricist - Kaithapram
- Filmfare Award for Best Music Director – Malayalam - S. P. Venkatesh
