= Babu Pallassery =

Indian scriptwriter for Mollywood films

- Citizenship: Indian
- Occupations: Dialogue writer, Scriptwriter, Actor
- Years active: 1994-present
- Notable work: Maanthrikam

Babu Pallassery is an Indian film scriptwriter, dialogue writer and actor who works in Mollywood. His screenplays include the film Maanthrikam, starring Mohanlal. He has written many television serials for Malayalam channels. His best known works in serials are Thaali, Gandharvayamam and Valsaylam. His serial Kanmani is telecast by Surya TV. He is a recipient of the Kerala Sangeetha Nataka Akademi Award (2021).

== Personal life ==
He is married to Sucy Babu. He has 2 sons, elder Lenin Babu, and younger Indian Pallassery. Both his sons have acted in movies as child artists. His younger son played a major character in the Malayalam movie Idukki Gold.

== Filmography ==
=== As a Scriptwriter ===
- Chukkan (1994)
- Sargavasantham (1995)
- Maanthrikam (1995)
- Arjunan Pillayum Anchu Makkalum (1997)
- Charlie Chaplin (1999)
- Summer Palace (2000)
- Bada Dosth (2006)
- Snake And Ladder (2011)

== As a Dialogue writer ==
- Chukaan (1994)
- Sargavasantham (1995)
- Maanthrikam (1995)
- Kanchanam (1996)
- Arjunan Pillayum Anchu Makkalum (1997)
- Charlie Chaplin (1999)
- Summer Palace (2000)
- Bada Dosth (2006)
- Snake And Ladder (2011)

=== As an actor ===
- Bada Dosth - uncredited (2006)
- Kanmani (TV Serial) - Madhaven
