= Makan Ente Makan =

- Directed by: J. Sasikumar
- Written by: M. D. Ratnamma; Salim Cherthala (dialogues)
- Screenplay by: Salim Cherthala
- Produced by: Joy Thomas
- Starring: Mammootty; Radhika; Bahadur; Sukumari
- Cinematography: N. A. Thara
- Edited by: K. Sankunni
- Music by: Johnson
- Production company: Jubilee Productions
- Distributed by: Jubilee Productions
- Release date: 22 February 1985
- Country: India
- Language: Malayalam

Makan Ente Makan is a 1985 Indian Malayalam-language film, directed by J. Sasikumar and produced by Joy Thomas. The film stars Sukumari, Mammootty, Radhika and Bahadur. The film has musical score by Johnson.

== Cast ==
- Mammootty as Prakasan
- Radhika as Sujatha
- Bahadur as Sankan Nair
- Sukumari as Saraswathi
- Mala Aravindan as Vasudevan
- Kaviyoor Ponnamma as Paaruvamma
- Chitra
- T. G. Ravi as Madhavan Nair
- Cochin Haneefa as Doctor
- Master Prasobh as Priyadarshanan
- Prathapachandran as Judge
- Mallika Sukumaran
- Rajan P. Dev
- V. D. Rajappan as Dasappan
- Beena Sabu

== Soundtrack ==
The music was composed by Johnson and the lyrics were written by Poovachal Khader.

No.	Song	Singers	Lyrics	Length (m:ss)
1	"Aaromale En Aaromale"	K. J. Yesudas, K. S. Chithra	Poovachal Khader	
2	"Aarorumillaathe"	K. J. Yesudas	Poovachal Khader	
3	"Onnaam Thumbi"	Jolly Abraham, Krishnachandran	Poovachal Khader	
4	"Vidhi Theerkum Veedhiyil"	K. J. Yesudas	Poovachal Khader	
