= Janmandharam =

- Directed by: Thampi Kannanthanam
- Written by: Thampi Kannanthanam; Kaloor Dennis (Dialogues)
- Screenplay by: Thampi Kannanthanam
- Produced by: Thampi Kannanthanam
- Starring: Balachandra Menon; Shobana; Ashokan; Siddique
- Cinematography: J. Williams
- Edited by: K. Sankunni
- Music by: S. P. Venkatesh
- Production company: Sharon Pictures
- Distributed by: Sharon Pictures
- Release date: 6 May 1988
- Country: India
- Language: Malayalam

Janmandharam (transl. Another life) is a 1988 Indian Malayalam-language film, directed by Thampi Kannanthanam and produced by Thampi Kannanthanam. The film stars Balachandra Menon, Shobana, Ashokan and Siddique in the lead roles. The film has musical score by S. P. Venkatesh.

== Cast ==
- Balachandra Menon as Police Officer
- Shobhana as Sridevi
- Ashokan as Hari
- Siddique as Abdu
- Vineeth as Unnikrishnan
- Shabana as Shoba
- M. G. Soman as Panikkar
- K. B. Ganesh Kumar as Murali
- Ramya Krishnan as Rekha
- Kuthiravattam Pappu as Kuruppilli Kuriakose
- Mala Aravindan as Karunan
- Adoor Bhavani as Aliyamma
- C. I. Paul as Bappu
- Nanditha Bose
- Paravoor Bharathan

== Soundtrack ==
The music was composed by S. P. Venkatesh.

No.	Song	Singers	Lyrics	Length (m:ss)
1	"Hridayam Kavarum"	K. S. Chithra, M. G. Sreekumar	Poovachal Khader	
2	"Oru Raajaa Oru Raani"	K. S. Chithra, M. G. Sreekumar	Poovachal Khader	
3	"Poovin Mridulathayalle"	K. S. Chithra	Poovachal Khader	
4	"Vaakku Kondenne"	K. S. Chithra, M. G. Sreekumar	Poovachal Khader	
