= Arjunan Pillayum Anchu Makkalum =

- Directed by: Chandrasekharan
- Written by: Babu Pallassery
- Produced by: K Shanmukham; C Gangadharan sons; M P Mohanan
- Starring: Innocent; Jagadish; Jagathy Sreekumar; Harishree Ashokan; KPAC Lalitha; Kalpana; Charmila; Bindu Panicker
- Cinematography: Sreesankar
- Edited by: K. Rajagopal
- Music by: Mohan Sithara
- Production company: Sree Sakthi Productions
- Release date: 23 January 1997
- Country: India
- Language: Malayalam

Arjunan Pillayum Anchu Makkalum (transl. Arjunan Pillai and five children) is a 1997 Indian Malayalam-language film directed and produced by Chandrasekharan. The film stars Innocent, Jagadish, Jagathy Sreekumar, Harishree Ashokan, KPAC Lalitha, Kalpana, Charmila, Baiju Santhosh and Bindu Panicker in the lead roles. The film has musical score by Mohan Sithara. It is a remake of the 1996 Tamil film Kaalam Maari Pochu.

== Plot ==
Arjunan Pillai is an autocratic father who sees his four daughters as burdens to be married off to anyone whatsoever but is fondly attached to his spoilt son Ajayan. Through a broker Adjustment Ayyappan, he arranges his elder daughters Jayalakshmi and Jayaprabha to be married to the rather old caterer Sudhakaran and low-earning municipality employee Thankakkuttan respectively, neither of who have any education comparable to them. Despite strong objections from the two daughters and his wife Sarada, he goes on with the marriage highhandedly. When the third daughter Jayasree stands up to him to support her sisters and mother, he decides to punish her by marrying her too off quickly to an autodriver Uthaman on the same day, earning her no-objection by lying that Uthaman runs an automobile workshop rather than drive someone else's auto.

Arjunan Pilla's only dream is to get his only son Ajayan married to a rich family.

Fortunately for the three sisters, their husbands, though low-earning, are responsible, loving, and simple human beings. Thankakkuttan, for e.g., loves his wife Jayaprabha dearly even though she denied him sex, even drugging him on their first night. When Uthaman's real status is revealed inevitably one day, all sisters and Sarada realise how wretched a father Arjunan Pillai is, and the sisters move out of the house to their husbands' homes.

Arjunan Pilla finally succeeds in his dream of seeking a rich alliance for Ajayan with the businessman K. G. P. Menon. However, Ajayan's wife Seetha and her father Menon are scheming greedy cheaters conniving to appropriate Arjuna Pilla's properties for themselves.

Uthaman, Sudhakaran and Thankakuttan plans to make their wives ask for Rs. 1 lakh each from their father for starting business but Arjunan Pilla refuses. Arjunan Pillai later divests all his properties (amounting to ~10 lakhs) to Ajayan for taking a loan. Though Sharada refuses the action Arjunan Pillai goes forward resulting in Sharada's death. Ajayan later misappropriates Arjunan Pillai's properties after Sharada's Death cheating his father and throws Arjunan Pillai and Jayasudha out of their home. They seek refuge under Parameswaran and his wife Madhavi who shelters them . The three sons-in-law fight together along with Arjunan Pillai to retrieve the family property from Ajayan. K. G. P Menon, the father-in-law of Ajayan, tries to break the unity of the sons-in-law of Arjunan Pilla but they stay together. Winning the court case, they get back the property and Ajayan in turn gets incriminated for cheating.

Arjunan Pillai, Uthaman, Sudhakaran and Thankakuttan prepares for marriage of Jayasudha. Though Ajayan tries to sabotage the marriage with the help of his father-in-law K.G.P. Menon all tries end in vain. Finally Ajayan disrupts the marriage function of Jayasudha but Arjunan Pillai's hell breaks loose and start beating Ajayan. Finally Ajayan realizes his mistake seeking apology from Arjunan Pillai for his actions and the whole family joyfully celebrates Jayasudha's marriage.

== Cast ==
- Innocent as Arjunan Pillai
- Jagadish as Uthaman, Jayasree's Husband
- Jagathy Sreekumar as Sudhakaran, Jayalekshmi's Husband
- Harishree Ashokan as Thankakuttan, Jayaprabha's Husband
- Baiju as Ajayan, S/o Arjunan Pillai
- Mala Aravindan as Parameswaran, Arjunan Pillai's Friend
- Salu Kuttanadu as Adjustment Ayyappan, Marriage Brocker
- C. I. Paul as K. G. P. Menon, Geetha's Father
- KPAC Lalitha as Sharada W/o Arjunan Pillai
- Bindu Panicker as Jayalakshmi D/o Arjunan Pillai
- Kalpana as Jayaprabha, D/o Arjunan Pillai
- Charmila as Jayasree, D/o Arjunan Pillai
- Amitha Sebastian as Jayasudha, D/o Arjunan Pillai
- Dharsana as Geetha, Ajayan's Wife
- Cherthala Lalitha as Madhavi W/o Parameswaran
- Ottapalam Pappan as Nellissery Viswanatha Menon

== Soundtrack ==
The music was composed by Mohan Sithara and the lyrics were written by Bichu Thirumala and Kaithapram.

No.	Song	Singers	Lyrics	Length
1	"Evide Nin Daivaamsham"	K. J. Yesudas	Kaithapram	5:46
2	"Manchaadi Chundathum"	K. S. Chithra, Chorus	Bichu Thirumala	4:44
3	"Moham Manassilittu"	Pradip Somasundaran, Chorus	Bichu Thirumala	5:16
4	"Vellikkinnam Niranju"	K. J. Yesudas	Kaithapram	4:20

== Trivia ==
- This movie was shot in Ottapalam near in Palakkad District of Kerala.

== Sexual Assault Allegations During Shoot ==
Lead actress Charmila revealed that M. P. Mohanan, one of the producers, barged into her room one night along with his friends during the shoot and tried to disrobe and gangrape her. The revelation came as part of a string of similar revelations by female artistes that rocked Malayalam film industry immediately following the publication of the Hema Committee Report in August 2024. She narrated how her male assistant who tried to protect her was also attacked and she barely escaped from the hotel and was carried away to safety by autorickshaw drivers on the street. She added that even though she herself escaped narrowly, some of the junior artistes in the set were not so lucky and were gangraped.
