= Karikkan villa murder =

1980 crime in Kerala, India

Karikkanvilla murder
- Native name: കരിക്കൻവില്ല കൊലപാതകം
- Date: 6 October 1980
- Location: Meenthalakkara, Tiruvalla, Kerala, India; 9°22′59″N 76°35′32″E
- Deaths: K. C. George & Rachel George
- Accused: Reni George; Gulam Mohammed; Gunashekharan; Kiblo Daniel
- Charges: Murder and theft
- Verdict: Life imprisonment for all the accused

The Karikkanvilla murder is a criminal incident occurred at Meenthalakkara in Tiruvalla, in the south Indian state of Kerala in 1980. The murder was one of the criminal cases which drew considerable media and public interest in Kerala, which eventually led to the arrest and conviction of all the four accused. The case also led to a debate on the legal and moral implications of capital punishment as the prime accused, Reni George, went on to become a noted social worker.

== Incident ==
On the morning of 7 October 1980, Gowri, a house maid, found her employers dead, early in the morning when she reported at their house for the daily chores. She was working for Mr. K. C. George and Rachel George, an issue-less aged couple living a retired life in their home, Karikkanvilla, in Meenthalakkara, a remote village near the Kerala town of Tiruvalla. The matter was reported to Kerala Police, who launched an investigation into the apparently unnatural deaths. The crime scene did not leave any clues except for some foot marks and the police found out the marks were made by shoes manufactured outside India.

== Crime and investigation ==
The case was handed over to Siby Mathews, who would later become one of the most accomplished police officers in Kerala service. On interrogation by police, the maid informed them that the couple expected one of their relatives, whom they referred to as Madrasile Mon (son from Madras), to pay a visit to them during those days. This led the trail to Chennai (then known as Madras), and to Reni George, a close relative of the murdered couple. Further investigations led to his arrest, along with three of his accomplices, Gulam Mohammed aka Chen, Gunasekharan, and Kiblo Daniel, the first from Mauritius, second from Malaysia and the last named, from Kenya.

It was revealed, during the investigation, that Reni George and his three accomplices were drug addicts. In order to raise money for footing their drug bills, they hatched a plot to kill and rob K. C. George and Rachel, who were closely related to the main accused. The couple were leading a retired life after their return from abroad and the culprits found them as easy targets. They reached Tiruvalla by road from Chennai and, on the night of 6 October 1980, beat the couple to death and escaped with money and jewelry, after wiping out the crime trails. Three of the accused, Reni George, Gulam Muhammad and Gunasekharan were apprehended soon and Kiblo Daniel surrendered to the police. Subsequent to their arrest, the accused were remanded to judicial custody and were housed at the Sub Jail in Mavelikkara.

== Legal proceedings ==
Kerala Police filed a case against the four accused, with Reni George as the prime accused, at the Additional Sessions Court, Mavelikkara. However, the case was shifted to the Sessions Court, Alappuzha, on request from the accused. The court returned a verdict of capital punishment for the accused, which was later reduced to life imprisonment. The culprits served out 15 years of jail terms and were released on 23 June 1995.

== Aftermath ==
While serving his sentence, Reni George, allegedly indulged in drug trafficking inside the jail during the early days. Later, he became repentant and turned to Christianity, eventually becoming an evangelist. He fell in love with a nurse, Teena, married her while he was on parole, and the couple has one daughter. After he was released from jail in 1995, he founded Reny's Children, a Bengaluru based children's home for the children of convicts, who are serving jail terms. He has turned into a preacher and runs a ministry that serves the prisons of the state of Karnataka. He has also founded the Bengaluru chapter of Prison Fellowship of India (PFI), a non governmental organization, engaged in the correction, welfare and rehabilitation of former and present prisoners and their families.

Reni George, on release from jail, began involved in social service and his efforts earned him awards including the 1998 Citizen of the Year Award from Kiran Bedi and the 2008 Real Heroes Award of CNN-IBN. The transformation of Reni George gave credence to the arguments of the anti-capital punishment lobby in India and K. T. Thomas, renowned justice of the Supreme Court of India, cited the case in his advocacy against capital punishment.

== Cultural references ==
The crime inspired a 1982 movie, Madrasile Mon, directed by J. Sasikumar, which had some names who would later become known in the Malayalam film industry, such as Ravikumar, Raveendran, Mohanlal and Thampi Kannanthanam, among other veteran artists.

== See also ==
- Madrasile Mon
- Sister Abhaya murder case
