= Avalude Katha =

1987 film

- Directed by: Jayadevan
- Written by: K. S. Mani
- Produced by: Purushan Alappuzha
- Starring: Sathaar; Anuradha; Ramu
- Music by: A. T. Ummer
- Production company: Sreedevi Movies
- Distributed by: Sreedevi Movies
- Release date: 4 September 1987
- Country: India
- Language: Malayalam

Avalude Katha is a 1987 Indian Malayalam film, directed by Jayadevan and produced by Purushan Alappuzha. The film stars Sathaar, Uma Maheshwari and Ramu in the lead roles. The film has musical score by A. T. Ummer.

== Cast ==
- Sathaar
- Alex Mathew
- Ramu
- Uma Maheshwari

== Soundtrack ==
The music was composed by A. T. Ummer and the lyrics were written by Poovachal Khader.

No.	Song	Singers	Lyrics	Length (m:ss)
1	"Aalolam"	Krishnachandran	Poovachal Khader	
2	"Kaalidaasa Kaavyamo"	K. J. Yesudas	Poovachal Khader	
3	"Kanmani Neeyurangoo"	S. Janaki	Poovachal Khader	
4	"Maanasaminnoru"	K. J. Yesudas	Poovachal Khader	
5	"Poonkinnam Njaan"	Lathika	Poovachal Khader	
6	"Raaga Rajani"	K. J. Yesudas	Poovachal Khader	
