= Sathya Jyothi =

- Directed by: K. Rangaraj
- Story by: Dennis Joseph
- Produced by: Joy Thomas; G. Thyagarajan
- Starring: Vishnuvardhan; Sumalatha; Urvashi; Jai Jagadish
- Cinematography: Dinesh Baboo
- Music by: Ilaiyaraaja
- Production companies: Jubilee Productions and Sathya Jyothi Films
- Distributed by: Jubilee Productions
- Release date: 1986
- Country: India
- Language: Kannada

Sathya Jyothi is a 1986 Kannada-language film. Starring Vishnuvardhan, Sumalatha, Urvashi, Jai Jagadish, T N Balakrishna, C H Lokanath. Directed by K. Rangaraj and music scored by Ilaya Raja. This film is a remake of Malayalam movie Nirakkoottu. This film was jointly produced by Jubilee Productions and Sathya Jyothi Films. It was an average success.

== Plot ==
Sujatha joins as a news reporter in a Kannada daily named "Suprabhatha", which is owned by M. K. Guruswamy. Sujatha stays with her friend, Dr. Shantha. Sujatha is assigned to interview Ravi, who is sentenced to death for the murder of his wife Kala, who is also Sujatha's sister. Supreme court had sentenced Ravi to death and the president also rejected Ravi's appeal. Sujatha covers and publishes the story of Ravi Varma and is well acclaimed and appreciated by Guruswamy, her boss, during the official meeting. They were also surprised on a feedback letter that had reached Suprabhatha office regarding the published article.

Ravi Varma is a wealthy man and the owner of an advertising agency. Kala was employed as a clerk in a firm, and is a classical dancer too. Ravi had met Kala during a dance program hosted at the club. He had then proposed with an offer for Kala join his advertising agency as a model, which Kala rejects instantly. However, on losing her job as a clerk and her family (consisting of an ill father, a younger sister and brother) being dependent on her income, she is forced to join Ravi's advertising agency. The advertising agency flourishes well with the utilization of Kala's modelling skills. A career oriented Ravi, in order to make Kala stay with his firm always, proposes to Kala and they get registry-married. After a week-long honeymoon, Ravi forces his wife to pose for modelling with a half-dressed costume, which Kala couldn't accept. This leads to indifference in their family life. Once Ravi realises that his wife is pregnant, an argument begins again regarding the fatherhood of the conceived child, and Ravi asks his wife to move out of his house. Kala then takes shelter in her friend, Dr Shantha's, house. Divorce was filed by Ravi, and it was granted with the verdict that Ravi needs to compensate his wife and child on a monthly basis until the child becomes a youth. A drunken Ravi visits Kala and tells her that instead of paying the compensation monthly, he would pay her all the money at once. Ravi then pulls a knife and murders Kala.

A day before his scheduled execution, Ravi Varma escapes prison, and accidentally meets Sujatha. He learns that Sujatha and Kala are sisters and informs the truth. Ravi loved Kala and never pressured her for any modelling assignments. Arjun used to blackmail Kala, by showing Kala's nude photographs which he had clicked. Fearing social stigma, Kala divorces Ravi unwillingly. Arjun later tries to molest Kala, kills her and flees. Since Ravi was on the murder spot, he was arrested by the police.

To avenge the same, Ravi escapes from the prison and kills Arjun.

== Cast ==
- Vishnuvardhan as Ravi Varma
- Sumalatha as Kala
- Urvashi as Sujatha
- Jai Jagadish as Arjun

== Soundtrack ==
Soundtrack was composed by Ilaiyaraaja, his only collaboration with Vishnuvardhan. All songs were penned by Chi. Udaya Shankar and R N Jayagopal.

Track listing
No.	Title	Lyrics	Singer(s)	Length
1.	"Krishnana Kaanuveya"	R. N. Jayagopal	K. S. Chithra
2.	"Ananda Aayithu Ananda"
3.	"Kannu Aado Maathe"	R. N. Jayagopal	K. J. Yesudas
4.	"Nee Needida Prema"	Chi. Udaya Shankar	S. P. Balasubrahmanyam, S. Janaki
