= Athiratha Maharatha =

1987 film

- Directed by: Perala
- Screenplay by: Perala
- Based on: Rajavinte Makan (Malayalam)
- Produced by: Bheemavarapu Bhucchi Reddy
- Starring: Anant Nag; Tiger Prabhakar; Ambika; Sayad
- Cinematography: Kabir Lal
- Edited by: Murali; Ramaiah
- Music by: K. Chakravarthy
- Production company: Jyothi Art Movies
- Release date: 9 October 1987
- Country: India
- Language: Kannada

Athiratha Maharatha is a 1987 Indian Kannada-language film, directed by Perala and produced by Bheemavarapu Bhucchi Reddy. The film stars Anant Nag, Tiger Prabhakar, Ambika and Sayad. The film has musical score by K. Chakravarthy. The movie is a remake of the Malayalam film Rajavinte Makan.

== Cast ==
- Anant Nag as Vijayprasad
- Tiger Prabhakar as Prithviraj
- Ambika as Radha
- Avinash as Anand
- Balakrishna
- Sathyajith as Pratap
- Lokanath
- Lohithaswa
- Sundar Krishna Urs as Chandrashekhar
- Manik Irani as Kidnapper
- Janardhan
- Krishne Gowda
- BEML Somanna
- Seetharam
- Nagesh Kampalapura
- Brahmavar
- Gopalakrishna
- Nanjundaiah
- Hanumanthachar
- Shanthamma
- Master Amith
- Master Chethan
- Vajramuni in Special appearance as Vikramraj

== Soundtrack ==
The music was composed by K. Chakravarthy.

No.	Song	Singers	Lyrics	Length (m:ss)
1	"Savidina"	S. P. Balasubrahmanyam	R. N. Jayagopal	
2	"Haaduve Naa"	P. Susheela	R. N. Jayagopal	
3	"Maagiya Kaalada"	P. Susheela, S. P. Balasubrahmanyam	R. N. Jayagopal	
