= Bhoomiyile Rajakkanmar =

Malayalam movie

Bhoomiyile Raajakkanmar
- Poster
- Directed by: Thampi Kannanthanam
- Written by: Dennis Joseph
- Produced by: Joy Thomas
- Starring: Mohanlal; Suresh Gopi; Nalini; Adoor Bhasi
- Cinematography: Jayanan Vincent
- Edited by: K. Sankunni
- Music by: S. P. Venkatesh
- Production company: Jubilee Productions
- Distributed by: Jubilee Productions
- Release date: 19 June 1987
- Country: India
- Language: Malayalam

Bhoomiyile Rajakkanmar (transl. Kings of the Earth) is a 1987 Indian Malayalam-language political thriller film directed by Thampi Kannanthanam, written by Dennis Joseph, and produced by Joy Thomas under the company Jubilee Productions. It features Mohanlal, Suresh Gopi, Nalini, Balan K. Nair, Adoor Bhasi, Jagadish, and Jagathy Sreekumar in major roles. The music for the film was composed by S. P. Venkatesh. This film was remade in Telugu.

== Plot ==
The scion of the Thekkumkoor royal family, Valiya Thamburan (meaning big leader), wants to introduce his heir Mahendra Varma to democracy. But Mahendra Varma is not interested in politics and is not very astute in the political game early in his political journey. For this sole purpose, Valiya Thamburam bribes the Chief Minister to make Mahendra Varma a minister in the current state government.

Once in power, Mahendra Varma tries to be independent from the Chief Minister's government and helps his friend Jayan, who is against the policies of the Chief Minister. Mahendra Varma after seeing the atrocities committed by the current political system joins forces with Jayan to improve the political scene of the state.

== Cast ==
- Mohanlal as Mahendra Varma Ilayaraja "Mahi'(Home Minister of Kerala)
- Suresh Gopi as Jayan, Mahi's friend
- Nalini as Lakshmi, Mahi's love interest and Jayan's friend
- Adoor Bhasi as Valiya Thampuran, Mahi's father
- Jagathy Sreekumar as Aromalunni, Mahi's uncle
- Balan K. Nair as Chief Minister M. S. Nair
- Jagadish as Babu, Mahi's friend
- Siddique as Siddique, Jayan and Mahi's friend
- K. B. Ganesh Kumar as Raju, Jayan and Mahi's friend
- Mohan Jose as Guerilla Chandran, Jayan and Mahi's friend
- Kollam Thulasi as Gopala Pillai
- K. P. A. C. Azeez as Antony
- K. P. A. C. Sunny as Vishwambaran
- Prathapachandran as Rajashekharan
- Kunjandi as Kunjunni Aasan
- Oduvil Unnikrishnan as Balan, Lawyer to Valiya Thampuran

== Soundtrack ==
The music was composed by S. P. Venkatesh and the lyrics were written by Shibu Chakravarthy.

No.	Song	Singers	Lyrics	Length
1	"Nin Kannukal Kavitha"	K. J. Yesudas	Shibu Chakravarthy	
2	"Shuklaambaradharam" [Slokam]		Traditional	
3	"Sindooravaanil Mullappoonkaavil"	Unni Menon	Shibu Chakravarthy	

== Release ==
The initial release date was delayed due to an issue with the Central Board of Film Certification regarding a dialogue in the film which remarks that a king's rule is better than democracy. Kannanthanam managed to convince the board members of the merits of the film and was finally certified. It was a commercial success.
