= Kanwarlal =

- Theatrical release poster
- Directed by: S. S. Ravichandra
- Written by: Jalees Sherwani (dialogues); Indeevar (lyrics)
- Screenplay by: S. S. Ravichandra
- Story by: Rajeev
- Based on: Rajavinte Makan (1986)
- Produced by: G. Hanumantha Rao; Krishna (Presents)
- Starring: Jeetendra; Raj Babbar; Sujata Mehta
- Cinematography: P.Dev Kumar
- Edited by: K. Vijaya Babu
- Music by: Bappi Lahiri
- Production company: Padmalaya Studios
- Release date: 29 July 1988
- Running time: 150 minutes
- Country: India
- Language: Hindi

Kanwarlal is a 1988 Indian Hindi-language action film, produced by G. Hanumantha Rao under the Padmalaya Studios banner, presented by Krishna and directed by S. S. Ravichandra. It stars Jeetendra, Raj Babbar, Sujata Mehta in lead roles and music composed by Bappi Lahiri. The film is a remake of the Malayalam film Rajavinte Makan (1986). The name of the title character was based on the character name from Jeetendra's 1981 movie Meri Aawaz Suno.

== Cast ==
- Jeetendra as Kanwarlal
- Raj Babbar as Minister Suraj Prakash
- Sujata Mehta as Advocate Sandhya
- Amjad Khan as John Jani Janardhan
- Arjun as Jagan
- Tiku Talsania as Advocate Uttamlal
- Birbal as Havaldar
- Jankidas as Trivedi
- Om Shivpuri as Public Prosecutor
- Pinchoo Kapoor as Chief Minister
- Viju Khote as Ram Prasad
- Manmohan Krishna as Shastriji
- Tej Sapru as Jangha
- Rajan Haksar as IGP

== Soundtrack ==
Song	Singer
"Kanwarlal Kanwarlal"	Asha Bhosle, Amit Kumar
"Jahan Mile, Jidhar Mile"	Asha Bhosle
"Maine Pehli Baar Jise"	Mohammed Aziz
"Yahan Devta Kaun Hai"	Mohammed Aziz
"Pyar Hai Ek Nasha"	Salma Agha
