= Madrasile Mon =

1982 Indian film

- Theatrical release poster
- Directed by: J. Sasikumar
- Screenplay by: P. M. Nair
- Story by: Kaviyoor Sivaraman Pillai
- Produced by: Mani Malliath
- Starring: Raveendran; Mohanlal; Ravikumar; Thampi Kannanthanam; K. P. Ummer; Sheela
- Cinematography: J. Williams
- Edited by: K. Sankunni
- Music by: Paravur Devarajan
- Production company: Ragam Movies
- Distributed by: Jubilee Release
- Release date: 20 August 1982
- Country: India
- Language: Malayalam

Madrasile Mon (transl. Son from Madras) is a 1982 Indian Malayalam-language true crime film directed by J. Sasikumar and written by P. M. Nair. It is based on the Karikkan villa murder incident that happened in Kerala in 1980. The film stars Raveendran, Mohanlal, Ravikumar, and Thampi Kannanthanam. It features music composed by Paravur Devarajan.

== Cast ==
- Raveendran
- Mohanlal
- Ravikumar
- Thampi Kannanthanam
- K. P. Ummer
- Sheela
- Reena
- K. N. Bal
- Alummoodan
- Manavalan Joseph
- Meena
- Prameela

== Production ==
Madrasile Mon is based on the Karikkan villa murder case that happened at Thiruvalla in 1980. The film was produced by Thiruvalla native Mani Malliath through the production company Ragam Movies. The title Madrasile Mon refers to the nickname of the main culprit Reny George. Police officer K. N. Bal (DSP), an investigating officer in the actual case appeared as the investigating officer in the film too. Raveendran portrayed Reni George, along with Mohanlal and Thampy Kannamthanam. The film was released two years after the incident.

== Soundtrack ==
The music was composed by G. Devarajan and the lyrics were written by A. P. Gopalan. The soundtrack album was released on 31 December 1981.

Madrasile Mon (Original Motion Picture Soundtrack)
No.	Title	Singer	Length
1.	"Innale Ennathu"	P. Jayachandran	4:20
2.	"Sthree Oru Lahari"	K. J. Yesudas	4:40
3.	"Udayashobhayil"	K. J. Yesudas	4:32
4.	"Elam Kodi"	P. Madhuri	3:58

== Release ==
The film initially scheduled to be released on 9 April 1982 was postponed and released on 20 August 1982. After the film's release, when the main culprit Reny George was released on parole, he blackmailed producer Mani Malliath and extorted ₹60,000 from him.

== Reception ==
It was one among the most successful films of Sasikumar.
