= Puthiya Karukkal =

Puthiya Karukkal (1989)
- Directed by: Thampi Kannanthanam
- Written by: Cochin Haneefa
- Produced by: Thampi Kannanthanam for Sharon Pictures
- Starring: Jayaram; Parvathy; Siddique; Sithara; K. B. Ganesh Kumar; Sathaar; M G Soman; Bheeman Raghu; Lalu Alex; Mala Aravindan
- Cinematography: J. Williams
- Edited by: Sankunni
- Music by: S. P. Venkatesh
- Release date: 3 March 1989
- Country: India
- Language: Malayalam

Puthiya Karukkal is a 1989 Indian Malayalam action thriller film, directed and produced by Thampi Kannanthanam. The film stars Jayaram, Parvathy Jayaram, Lalu Alex and M. G. Soman in the lead roles. The film has musical score by S. P. Venkatesh.

== Plot ==
Udaya Varma is a rich wheelchair-using estate baron living with his young wife Sridevi at his estate bungalow. Both manage Varma's estates together with the help of their trusted manager Jagadeesh. They frequently socialize with Varma's doctor & friend Thomas Kurian, who lives with his granddaughter. Varma generously helps Sridevi's father in marrying off his 2 younger daughters and also with his medication and expenses. Into their life comes the ex-convict Vinod, who is released recently from prison having served a term for murder. He starts stalking Sridevi at their estate and bungalow and is bent on killing her, claiming that they were former lovers and she cheated her to marry the rich old man when he got arrested for trying to protect her modesty. At one point, he asks her about their child which further terrorizes her. Varma who notices the fear and mood swings in Sridevi brings over Dr. Kurian to check her, but she insists that she's alright.

On the new year Eve, Varma is awaiting the doctor for the new year party at their bungalow while Sridevi has fears that Vinod might come to their home to finish her off as he had threatened earlier. As it nears midnight, Vinod sneaks inside the bungalow to see Sridevi, but in a sudden turn of events Dr. Kurian shoots Udaya Varma to death. He subdues Vinod who barges in and warns both not to inform the police. When Vinod tries to phone for police, Sridevi stops him revealing that their daughter is alive and is being raised by the doctor as his own granddaughter and he is blackmailing them not to reveal the truth to anyone at the cost of their daughter's life. They frame the scene to make it look like Varma shot himself as advised by the doctor. The next day Jagadeesh who had gone home for vacation returns and is shocked to hear the news. The police start an official investigation despite Sridevi's claim that Varma shot himself during the new year fireworks and she could not hear anything.

Meanwhile, Robert turns up at the hill station and meets with Jagadeesh; he reveals of the connection between Sridevi and Vinod and requests him to aid him in getting his revenge on Vinod. Jagadeesh reopens the investigation on Varma's death with the police, naming Vinod as the prime suspect, at the same time trying to approach Sridevi with ill intentions. The police eventually confirm Vinod's presence on the premises with the help of Varma's servant Rajappan and arrests him. Sridevi rushes to the doctor and berates him for killing her innocent husband, framing Vinod, and taking away their daughter. The doctor then reveals a flashback, that he is doing all this to exact revenge on Varma and Jagadeesh. The doctor's daughter was in love with a Hindu boy which was opposed vehemently by him. Varma meets the couple in the woods who were planning to elope and lures them to the estate on the pretext of convincing Varma. As they tie up her lover and try to rape her, she escapes with her lover, injuring Varma's leg in the process and disabling him. As they try to escape through the woods, they are pushed to their death in the canyon by Jagadeesh which was witnessed by Dr. Thomas's head nurse daughter. Varma convinces the doctor that his daughter and lover committed suicide. But the doctor gets to know the real story when the nurse comes to join him later. The reason he took away Sridevi's daughter born out of wedlock was to plan Varma's murder and blackmail Sridevi into getting away with it. Vinod breaks out of prison once again and comes to the doctor's house to claim their child. He gets taken prisoner by the doctor and his henchmen, who then proceed to Jagadeesh's place. Sridevi comes in and frees Vinod and they also reach Jagadeesh's hideout. Vinod explains that the police were suspecting the doctor from the start, and that they deliberately freed him to catch the doctor. The doctor kills Jagadeesh and exacts his final revenge meanwhile Vinod & Sridevi is re-united with their daughter. In the end, Dr. Kurian is apprehended by the police.

== Cast ==
- Jayaram as Vinod
- Parvathy as Sridevi
- Lalu Alex as Dr. Thomas Kurien
- M. G. Soman as Udaya Varma
- Sathaar as Jagadeesh
- Bheeman Raghu as Robert
- Siddique as Basheer
- Ganesh as Suresh
- Sithara as Sindhu
- Mala Aravindan as Rajappan
- Santhakumari as Leelamma
- PC George as Police Inspector

== Soundtrack ==
Music was by S. P. Venkatesh, while lyrics were by Poovachal Khader.

No.	Song	Singer(s)
1	"Manjum Madhumaariyum ..."	K. J. Yesudas
2	"Manjum Madhumaariyum ..."	K. S. Chithra, Chorus
