= Nirakkoottu =

- DVD cover
- Directed by: Joshiy
- Written by: Dennis Joseph
- Produced by: Joy Thomas
- Starring: Mammootty; Sumalatha; Urvashi; Lizy; Babu Namboothiri; Jose Prakash; Azeez; P. K. Abraham
- Cinematography: Jayanan Vincent; Vipin Das
- Edited by: K. Sankunni
- Music by: Shyam
- Production company: Jubilee Productions
- Release date: 12 September 1985
- Running time: 130 minutes
- Country: India
- Language: Malayalam

Nirakkoottu is a 1985 Indian Malayalam-language crime thriller film directed by Joshiy, written by Dennis Joseph, starring Mammootty, Sumalatha, Urvashi, Lizy, Babu Namboothiri and Jose Prakash. The music was composed by Shyam. The story follows journalist Sasikala Varghese's (Urvashi) investigation of millionaire Ravi Varma (Mammootty), who is sentenced to death for the murder of his wife Mercy (Sumalatha). The film was remade in Tamil as Manithanin Marupakkam , in Kannada as Sathya Jyothi and in Hindi as Kanoon Ki Zanjeer.

== Plot ==
Sasikala Varghese gets a job as a news reporter in a Malayalam daily named Keralarema, which is owned by M. K. Abraham. Sasikala stays with her friend, Dr. Suma. She is assigned to interview Ravi Varma, a millionaire who is sentenced to death for the murder of his wife Mercy, who was also Sasikala's sister. The Supreme Court has sentenced Ravi to death, and the President has rejected Ravi's appeal. Sasikala covers and publishes the story of Ravi Varma and is praised by Abraham, her boss, during the official meeting. They were then surprised by a feedback letter that had reached the Keralarema office regarding the published article.

The film then transitions into a flashback following Ravi Varma, the accused man. Ravi was a wealthy man and the owner of an advertising agency. Mercy is employed as a clerk in a firm and is also a classical dancer. Ravi had met Mercy during a dance program hosted at a club. He had then proposed an offer to Mercy for her to join his advertising agency as a model, which Mercy immediately rejects. However, upon losing her job as a clerk and with her family (consisting of an ill father, a younger sister and brother) already dependent on her income, she is forced to join Ravi's advertising agency. The advertising agency flourishes well with the utilization of Mercy's modeling skills. A career-oriented Ravi, in order to make Mercy stay with his firm permanently, proposes to Mercy and they get registry-married, as they belong to different religions. After a week-long honeymoon, Ravi forces his wife to pose for modeling with a half-dressed costume, despite her protests. This leads to conflict in their family life. Once Ravi learns that his wife is pregnant, an argument begins again regarding the fatherhood of the conceived child, and Ravi asks his wife to move out of his house. Mercy then takes shelter with her friend, Dr. Suma. Ravi files for divorce, and it is granted with the verdict that Ravi needs to compensate his wife and child on a monthly basis until the child becomes a youth. A drunken Ravi visits Mercy and tells her that instead of paying the compensation monthly, he would pay her all the money at once. Ravi then pulls a knife and murders Mercy.

A day before his scheduled execution, Ravi Varma escapes prison, and accidentally meets Sasikala. He learns that Sasikala and Mercy are sisters and tells her the truth about what really happened.

Ravi sincerely loved his wife Mercy and never pressured her for any modeling assignments Post-marriage. Sasikala's colleague Ajith who worked as a part-time photographer at Ravi's firm had blackmailed Mercy by threatening to expose nude images of her to Ravi and the public which Ajith took it by hiding while she was changing her clothes during the modeling days if she doesn't spend a night with him which she refuses. Ajith reveals those images to Ravi who initially misunderstands Mercy for adultery. Ravi divorces Mercy reluctantly but came to know the truth when he found a diary of Mercy at home where she reveals what actually happened. Ajith later tries to rape Mercy, fatally stabs her and flees when Ravi arrives. She dies at Ravi's arms. Since Ravi was at the scene of the murder, the Police and the Public mistaken him as the killer. Ravi was taken into custody by the police and the public burns his car where Mercy's diary also gets burnt destroying the whole evidence. To avenge Mercy's death, Ravi escaped from the prison and finally he kills Ajith and surrenders.

== Cast ==
- Mammootty as Ravi Varma
- Sumalatha as Mercy Varghese
- Urvashi as Sasikala Varghese
- Lissy as Dr. Suma
- Babu Namboothiri as Ajith
- Azeez as Jailor
- Jose Prakash as M. K. Abraham
- Baiju as Boy at the petrol bunk
- Prathapachandran as Paul Mathew
- Thodupuzha Vasanthi as co-worker of Sasikala

== Release ==
The film was released on 12 September 1985.

=== Box office ===
The film was both commercial and critical success.

== Soundtrack ==
The music was composed by Shyam and the lyrics were written by Poovachal Khader. K. S. Chithra won her first Kerala State Film Award for Best Singer for the song Poomaname and the song is reused in 2024 film Abraham Ozler

Song	Singers
"Poomaaname"	K. S. Chithra
"Poomaaname"	G. Venugopal
"Poomaaname"	K. G. Markose
"Pranaya Sankalpame"	Vani Jairam, Satheesh Babu

== Awards ==
- Mammootty won the Kerala State Film Award – Special Jury Award in 1985 Kerala State Film Awards for his role as Ravi Varma.
- K. S. Chithra won the Kerala State Film Awards in 1985 Best Play Back Singer for the song "Poomaname"
- Filmfare Award for Best Film - Malayalam - Joy Thomas (1985)
