= S. P. Venkatesh =

Background information
- Also known as: Sangeetharajan
- Born: 5 March 1955; Bellary, Karnataka, India
- Died: 3 February 2026 (aged 70) Chennai, Tamil Nadu, India
- Genre: Film score
- Occupations: Film score composer, music director, instrumentalist
- Instruments: Guitar, vocals, violin

S. P. Venkatesh (5 March 1955 – 3 February 2026), also credited as Sangeetharajan or Sangeetha Raja, was an Indian music director and composer who primarily worked in Malayalam films besides Tamil and Kannada films. He was at his prime in the late 1980s and 1990s, being reputed for his background scores and songs in Malayalam cinema.

== Life and career ==
Venkatesh's father, Pazhani, was an accomplished mandolin player. Earlier in his life, he played the guitar, banjo and mandolin, and was an assistant music director to Shyam and Raveendran during his early days. He was introduced into the Malayalam film industry by Dennis Joseph, with his first break coming in the film Rajavinte Makan, directed by Thampi Kannanthanam. The film and its songs were big hits, and Venkatesh subsequently became a regular collaborator to Thampi's work, resulting in a series of hit musical albums during the 1990s. Indrajaalam, Kilukkam, Minnaram, Spadikam, Dhruvam, Kauravar, Johnnie Walker, Kizhakkan Pathrose, and Hitler featured his best known film scores.

He also handled the orchestration for many other music directors. He composed background scores for films for which songs were composed by other composers, such as Devasuram. He has also scored for some Bollywood and Bengali films.

In 1993, he won the Kerala State Film Award for Best Music Director for his work in Paithrukam and Janam, Filmfare Award for Best Music Director for his work in Paithrukam.

In 1999, he notably recorded nine songs in a single day for the unreleased Tamil film Ithu Mudivithillai starring Babu Ganesh and Vichithra.

Venkatesh died from cardiac arrest on 3 February 2026, at the age of 70.

== Discography ==
=== Malayalam films ===
Year	Film	Songs	Score	Notes
1985	Janakeeya Kodathi	No	Yes	
1986	Vivahithare Ithile	No	Yes	
1986	Desatanakkili Karayarilla	No	Yes	
1986	Rajavinte Makan	Yes	Yes	
1986	Rareeram	No	Yes	
1987	Vilambaram	Yes	Yes	
1987	Vazhiyorakazchakal	Yes	Yes	
1987	P.C. 369	No	Yes	
1987	Naradhan Keralathil	No	Yes	
1987	Bhoomiyile Rajakkanmar	Yes	Yes	
1989	Puthiya Karukkal	Yes	Yes	
1989	Douthyam	No	Yes	
1989	Mahayanam	No	Yes	
1990	Vyooham	No	Yes	
1990	Indrajaalam	Yes	Yes	
1990	No.20 Madras Mail	No	Yes	
1990	Appu	No	Yes	
1990	Kuttettan	No	Yes	
1991	Koodikazhcha	Yes	Yes	
1991	Thudar Katha	Yes	Yes	
1991	Kilukkam	Yes	Yes	
1992	Naadody	Yes	Yes	
1992	Cheppadividya	Yes	Yes	
1992	Kaazhchakkppuram	No	Yes	
1992	Ennodu Ishtam Koodamo	Yes	Yes	
1992	Mahanagaram	No	Yes	
1992	Kizhakkan Pathrose	Yes	Yes	
1992	Kauravar	Yes	Yes	
1992	Johnnie Walker	Yes	Yes	
1992	Daddy	Yes	Yes	
1993	Sthreedhanam	Yes	Yes	
1993	Sowbhagyam	Yes	Yes	
1993	Pravachakan	Yes	Yes	
1993	Devaasuram	No	Yes	
1993	Journalist	Yes	Yes	
1993	Janam	Yes	Yes	
1993	Injakkadan Mathai & Sons	Yes	Yes	
1993	Ethu Manju Kaalam	Yes	Yes	
1993	Customs Diary	No	Yes	
1993	Vendor Daniel State Licency	Yes	Yes	
1993	Dhruvam	Yes	Yes	
1993	Valsalyam	Yes	Yes	
1993	Sopanam	Yes	Yes	
1993	Paithrukam	Yes	Yes	
1993	Sainyam	Yes	Yes	
1993	Gandharvam	Yes	Yes	
1994	Kabooliwala	Yes	Yes	
1994	Pidakkozhi Koovunna Noottandu	Yes	Yes	
1994	Minnaram	Yes	Yes	
1994	Kashmeeram	No	Yes	
1994	Kambolam	Yes	No	
1994	Bheesmacharya	Yes	No	
1994	Vishnu	No	Yes	
1995	Highway	Yes	Yes	
1995	Mannar Mathai Speaking	Yes	Yes	
1995	Sphadikam	Yes	Yes	
1995	Puthukkottayile Puthumanavalan	Yes	Yes	
1995	Manthrikam	Yes	Yes	
1995	Kusruthikaatu	No	Yes	
1995	Kidilol Kidilam	Yes	Yes	
1995	Kalamasseriyil Kalyanayogam	No	Yes	
1995	Avittam Thirunaal Aarogya Sriman	Yes	Yes	
1995	Aniyan Bava Chetan Bava	Yes	Yes	
1995	Aadyathe Kanmani	Yes	Yes	
1996	Swapna Lokathe Balabhaskaran	Yes	Yes	
1996	Kaathil Oru Kinnaram	Yes	Yes	
1996	Hitler	Yes	Yes	
1996	Swarnakireedam	Yes	Yes	
1997	Chandralekha	Yes	Yes	
1997	Superman	Yes	Yes	
1997	Nagarapuranam	Yes	Yes	
1997	Lelam	No	Yes	
1997	Hitler Brothers	Yes	Yes	
1997	Ekkareyanente Manasam	Yes	Yes	
1997	Maasmaram	Yes	Yes	
1997	Bhoopathi	Yes	Yes	
1998	Oro Viliyum Kathorthu	Yes	Yes	
1998	Mayajalam	Yes	Yes	
1998	Amma Ammaayiyamma	No	Yes	
1998	Alibabayum Arara Kallanmarum	No	Yes	
1999	Vazhunnor	No	Yes	
1999	Parassala Pachan Payyannur Paramu	Yes	Yes	
1999	Aayiram Meni	Yes	Yes	
1999	Red Indians	Yes	Yes	
2001	Ee Nadu Innale Vare	Yes	Yes	
2001	Dubai	No	Yes	
2001	Kakkakuyil	No	Yes	
2001	Level Cross	Yes	Yes	
2001	Dhosth	Yes	Yes	
2002	Videsi Nair Swadesi Nair	No	Yes	
2002	Jagathi Jagathish in Town	No	Yes	
2004	Maratha Nadu	No	Yes	
2004	Agninakshathram	No	Yes	
2004	Vajram	No	Yes	
2004	Runway	No	Yes	
2004	Mampazhakkalam	No	Yes	
2005	Junior Senior	No	Yes	
2005	Iruvattam Manavaatti	No	Yes	
2005	Pandippada	No	Yes	
2006	Kilukkam Kilukilukkam	Yes	Yes	
2006	Pathaka	No	Yes	
2007	Detective	Yes	Yes	
2009	Bharya Onnu Makkal Moonnu	No	Yes	
2009	Patham Nilayile Theevandi	Yes	Yes	
2010	Koottukar	Yes	Yes	
2010	9 KK Road	Yes	No	
2013	Ginger	Yes	Yes	
2014	Thomson Villa	Yes	Yes	
2015	Samrajyam 2	No	Yes	
2023	Kittiyal Ooty	Yes	Yes	
2026	Velleppam	Yes	Yes	

=== Tamil films ===
Year	Film	Songs	Score	Notes
1988	Poovukkul Boogambam	Yes	Yes	
1989	Kaaval Poonaigal	Yes	Yes	
1989	En Kanavar	Yes	Yes	
1990	Paattali Magan	Yes	Yes	
1990	Pathimoonam Number Veedu	Yes	Yes	
1990	Salem Vishnu	Yes	Yes	
1991	Nanbargal	No	Yes	
1991	Vigneshwar	Yes	Yes	
1991	Theechatti Govindan	Yes	Yes	
1992	Idhuthanda Sattam	Yes	Yes	
1993	Rajadhi Raja Raja Kulothunga Raja Marthanda Raja Gambeera Kathavaraya Krishna Kamarajan	No	Yes	
1995	Maru Visaranai	Yes	Yes	
1999	Adutha Kattam	Yes	Yes	
2000	Nee Enthan Vaanam	Yes	Yes	
2002	Game	Yes	Yes	
2002	Ammaiyappa	Yes	Yes	
2003	Vadakku Vaasal	Yes	Yes	
2003	Bheeshmar	Yes	Yes	
2006	Iruvar Mattum	No	Yes	
2007	Muni	No	Yes	
2008	Kasimedu Govindan	No	Yes	
2009	Pinju Manasu	No	Yes	
2010	Mandabam	No	Yes	
2010	Unakkaga En Kadhal	No	Yes	
2010	Tiruppur	No	Yes	
2021	Otru	Yes	Yes	

=== Kannada films ===
Year	Film	Notes
1981	Prema Yuddha	
1989	Madhuri	
1989	Sharavegada Saradara	
1990	Poli Kitty	
1990	Panchama Veda	
1990	Ekalavya	
1990	Ashwamedha	
1991	Sundarakanda	
1991	Keralida Kesari	
1992	Hosa Raaga	
1992	Megha Mandara	
1995	Aragini	
1995	Nilukada Nakshatra	
1999	Z	Score only
2007	Amrutha Vaani	Score only
2010	Aithalakkadi	Score only
2016	Suli	
2017	Veera Ranachandi	

=== Bengali films ===
Year	Film	Notes
2002	Sathi	
2003	Champion	
2003	Mayer Shakti	
2003	Nater Guru	
2003	Sangee	
2008	Bhalobasa Bhalobasa	
2008	Bajimaat	
2008	Jor	
2013	Boss: Born to Rule	Score only

=== Hindi films ===
Year	Film	Notes
1992	Muskurahat	Score only
1992	Mera Dil Tere Liye	Score only
1993	Gardish	Score only
1997	Virasat	Score only
2001	Yeh Teraa Ghar Yeh Meraa Ghar	Score only
2003	Hungama	Score only
2005	Kyon Ki	Score only

== Sources ==
- "SP. Venkatesh – Malayalam Music Director". www.raaga.com.
