= Vazhiyorakazchakal =

1987 film by Thampi Kannanthanam

Vazhiyorakkazchakal
- Poster designed by Gayathri Ashokan
- Directed by: Thampi Kannanthanam
- Written by: Dennis Joseph
- Screenplay by: Dennis Joseph
- Produced by: Thampi Kannanthanam
- Starring: Mohanlal; Ratheesh; Ambika; Jagathy Sreekumar
- Cinematography: Jayanan Vincent
- Edited by: K. Sankunni
- Music by: S. P. Venkatesh
- Production company: Sharon Films
- Distributed by: Sharon Films
- Release date: 28 August 1987
- Country: India
- Language: Malayalam

Vazhiyorakazchakal is a 1987 Indian Malayalam-language mystery drama film, directed and produced by Thampi Kannanthanam under the banner of Sharon Films based on a screenplay by Dennis Joseph. The film stars Mohanlal, Ratheesh and Ambika in lead roles along with Jagathy Sreekumar, Suresh Gopi and M. G. Soman appearing in other pivotal roles. The film has musical score by S. P. Venkatesh.

== Plot ==
Baburaj, an IPS officer after marrying Sreedevi meets with a terrible accident. Sreedevi takes her husband to their Kodaikanal estate to help him recover. There she meets Raghavan, a Malayali driver who later helps her to take care of Babu. Sreedevi's lecher uncle Ravi pesters her with sexual advances. Baburaj, by the help of Ayurveda recovers quickly and realizes from the police diary that Raghavan is actually Lance Naik Antony Isaac who had helped Babu during his Dehradun training and in that time, Anthony, murdered his wife after finding out her extramarital relationship. Anthony is an escapee from police custody after being sentenced to death. Slowly, they realise that it is Ashok who betrayed Anthony's trust and cheated with his wife. Raghavan accidentally meets Ashok and remembers who Babu is and runs to their house to kill Ashok. Babu tries to stop an angry Raghavan, but fails to do so, and Raghavan surrenders after doing the deed.

The music Score by S P Venkatesh is a main part of the success of this film. The Art direction by Sabu Pravadas is also excellent in its Perfection

== Cast ==
- Mohanlal as Raghavan / Antony Issac
- Ratheesh as Baburaj
- Ambika as Sreedevi
- Jagathy Sreekumar as Stephen, a Music school teacher
- Suresh Gopi as Ashok
- Charuhasan
- Meena as Sreedevi's mother
- Jayarekha as Lalitha
- MG Soman as Ravi
- Anandavally as Ravi's wife
- Nalini
- Siddique as Peter, flirt
- Appa Haja as flirt
- Mohan Jose as Sub Inspector Chandy

== Soundtrack ==
The music was composed by S. P. Venkatesh and the lyrics were written by Shibu Chakravarthy.

No.	Song	Singers	Lyrics	Length (m:ss)
1	"Karimannoororu Bhoothathaanude"	P. Jayachandran	Shibu Chakravarthy	
2	"Onanaalil"	K. S. Chithra, P. Jayachandran	Shibu Chakravarthy	
3	"Pavizhamallippoovurangi"	K. S. Chithra	Shibu Chakravarthy	
4	"Yadukula Gopike"	K. S. Chithra, Unni Menon	Shibu Chakravarthy	
