= Naadody =

- Poster
- Directed by: Thampi Kannanthanam
- Screenplay by: T. A. Razzaq
- Story by: Julia
- Produced by: Thampi Kannanthanam
- Starring: Mohanlal; Suresh Gopi; Babu Antony; N. N. Pillai; Jagathy Sreekumar; Mohini
- Cinematography: Tony
- Edited by: E. M. Madhavan
- Music by: S. P. Venkatesh
- Production company: Julia Productions
- Distributed by: Julia Pictures
- Release date: 23 October 1992
- Running time: 152 minutes
- Country: India
- Language: Malayalam

Naadody (transl. Nomad) is a 1992 Indian Malayalam-language action drama film produced and directed by Thampi Kannanthanam and written by T. A. Razzaq. It stars Mohanlal in the lead role, alongside Suresh Gopi, Babu Antony, N. N. Pillai, Jagathy Sreekumar, Kuthiravattam Pappu, Jose Pellissery, Sathaar, Mohini, Sangita Madhavan Nair and Baby Vichitra. The music was composed by S. P. Venkatesh.The film was released on October 25, 1992 during Diwali day.

== Plot ==
Sachidanandan, a likeable drifter, comes to the hill station looking for Andrew about a promised job. He meets a little girl and Sophy at a park, and rescues the little girl from drowning. Then Sachi comes into contact with Menon, the girl child's Grand Father. Menon is a millionaire and Sophy is the Nanny who looks after his grand daughter, his sole heir. Soon Sachi develops a friendship closer to a filial bond with Menon. Menon then takes in Sachi as his trusted Manager. Around the same time Sachi and Sophy develop a romantic relation with the blessings of Menon and his house hold. Menon wishes to entrust his grand child to the couple's care, whom they too are very fond of. Meanwhile, Sivan who is Menon's nephew, a high-roller in constant conflict with Menon, intends to get all the wealth from Menon and marry Sophy. He enlists the help of Jackson, his newly appointed horse trainer, to execute his plan. But Jackson had other plans.

== Cast ==
- Mohanlal in a dual role as:
  - Sachidanandan (Sachi)
  - Balakrishnan Bhagavathar, Sachidanandan's father
- Suresh Gopi as Shivan
- Babu Antony as Jackson
- N. N. Pillai as Meloor Prabhakara Menon
- Jagathy Sreekumar as Kunjikuttan Nair, Menon's Assistant
- Mohini as Sophie Ninan Varghese
- Sangita as Sindhu (Sindhumol), Sachidanandan's step-sister
- Kuthiravattam Pappu as Kutty / Kuttikka
- Jose Pellissery as Driver Narayanan
- Sathaar as Police Officer Stephen
- Baby Vichithra as Chinnu Mol, Menon's Granddaughter
- Prathapachandran as Ninan Varghese, Sophie's father
- Nandu as Shaji, Villager
- Ravi Menon as Doctor Anil
- Silk Smitha Special Appearance in the Song 'Thambrante' with Mohanlal
- Chithra as Susheela, Balakrishnan's wife and Sachidanandan's mother (Cameo appearance)
- Rupini as Meera Nair, Balakrishnan's second wife and Sindhu's mother (Cameo appearance)

== Production ==
For an emotional scene in the film taking place after the conversation between Mohanlal and N. N. Pillai, director Kannanthanam challenged Mohanlal to cry without using Glycerine. Ultimately, Mohanlal won the bet. During the shooting of this film, Babu Antony fell head first into a glass panel and started bleeding.

== Soundtrack ==
The film features original soundtrack composed by S. P. Venkatesh. Released on 15 July 1992 by Ranjini Cassettes.

All lyrics are written by O. N. V. Kurup.

No.	Title	Singer(s)	Length
1.	"Dhoore Dhoore"	M. G. Sreekumar	5:07
2.	"Kunjupava"	M. G. Sreekumar, Minmini, C.O. Anto	4:31
3.	"Naadham Maninaadham"	M. G. Sreekumar	7:52
4.	"Thalolam Poo" (Female)	K. S. Chithra	3:58
5.	"Thalolam Poo"	K. G. Markose	3:59
6.	"Thambrante"	K. S. Chithra, Malaysia Vasudevan	5:14
