= Thampi Kannanthanam =

Indian filmmaker (1953–2018)

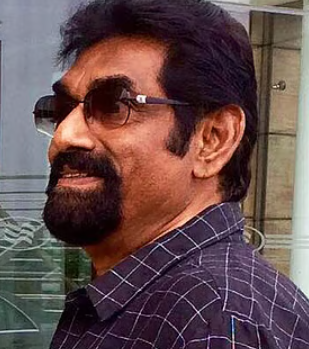
- Born: 11 December 1953; Kanjirappally, Kerala, India
- Died: 2 October 2018 (aged 64); Parathodu, Kerala, India
- Education: St. Dominic's College
- Occupations: Film director; film producer; screenwriter; actor
- Years active: 1979–2007
- Spouse: Kunjumol
- Children: 2
- Parents: Baby Kannanthanam; Thankamma

Thampi Kannanthanam (11 December 1953 – 2 October 2018) was an Indian film director, screenwriter, producer and actor, who worked in Malayalam cinema. He has directed 16 films.

== Personal life ==
Thampi Kannanthanam was born on 11 December 1953 as the sixth son of Baby Kannanthanam and Thankamma at Kanjirappally, Kottayam. He studied in MT Seminary School and at St. Dominic's College. He began his film career as an assistant director. Thampi was married to Kunjumol and the couple have two children—Aiswarya and Angel.

== Career ==
Kannanthanam debuted as a director in 1983 with the film Thaavalam. He has also acted in Itha Oru Theeram (1980), Attimari (1981), Madrasile Mon (1982), Thudarkatha (1991). He was most active during the period 1980–90. His most notable directorial films include Rajavinte Makan (1986), Vazhiyorakazchakal (1987), Bhoomiyile Rajakkanmar (1987), Indrajaalam (1990), Naadody (1992), Chukkan (1994) and Maanthrikam (1995).

== Death ==
Kannanthanam was admitted to a private hospital in Kochi following various ailments. His health condition worsened further and he died on 2 October 2018. He is survived by his wife Kunjumol, daughters Aiswarya and Angel.

== Filmography ==
Year	Title	Worked as					Notes
Year	Title	Director	Producer	Writer	Actor	Other	Notes
1979	Itha Oru Theeram				Yes		
1980	Ithikkara Pakki					Yes	Assistant director
1980	Theenalangal					Yes	Assistant director
1981	Kodumudikal				Yes		Associate director
1981	Attimari				Yes	Yes	Assistant director
1982	Madrasile Mon				Yes		
1982	Post Mortem				Yes	Yes	Associate director
1983	Thavalam	Yes		Story			
1983	Passport	Yes					
1983	Kaathirunna Divasam				Yes		
1985	Aa Neram Alppa Dooram	Yes		Yes			
1986	Rajavinte Makan	Yes	Yes				
1987	Vazhiyorakkazhchakal	Yes	Yes				
1987	Bhoomiyile Rajakkanmar	Yes					
1988	Janmandharam	Yes	Yes	Yes			
1989	Puthiya Karukkal	Yes	Yes	Story			
1990	Indrajaalam	Yes	Yes				
1991	Thudar Katha		Yes		Yes		
1991	Kadalora Kattu		Yes		Yes		
1992	Naadody	Yes	Yes				
1994	Chukkan	Yes	Yes				
1995	Nirnayam				Yes		
1995	Maanthrikam	Yes	Yes				
1997	Masmaram	Yes	Yes				
1998	Panchaloham		Yes				
1999	Ustaad				Yes		
1999	Thachiledathu Chundan		Yes				
2000	Oru Cheru Punchiri				Yes		
2001	Onnaman	Yes		Yes			
2001	Hadh: Life on the Edge of Death	Yes					Hindi film
2004	Sasneham Sumithra				Yes		
2004	Freedom	Yes	Yes	Yes		Lyricist	6 songs
2007	Oliver Twist				Yes		
