= Paresh Rawal filmography =

List of films of Indian actor Paresh Rawal

Paresh Rawal is an Indian actor who appeared primarily in Hindi films in addition to a few Telugu, Gujarati and Tamil films. He has appeared in over 240 films and is the recipient of various accolades. In 1994, he won the National Film Award for Best Supporting Actor for his performances in the films Woh Chokri and Sir.

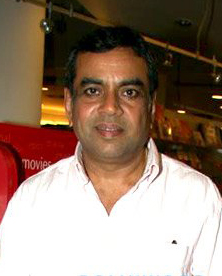
Paresh Rawal

== Films ==
Key
| † | Denotes films that have not yet been released |

| Year | Film | Role | Notes |
|---|---|---|---|
| 1982 | Naseeb Ni Balihari | Devaa | Gujarati film |
| 1984 | Holi | Unknown | Uncredited role |
| 1984 | Lorie | Prosecuting Attorney | |
| 1985 | Arjun | Anup | |
| 1986 | Bhagwaan Dada | Inspector Vijay | |
| 1986 | Samundar | Hansukh | |
| 1986 | Naam | Ranna | |
| 1987 | Mirch Masala | Villager | |
| 1987 | Dacait | Vishnu Pandey | |
| 1987 | Marte Dam Tak | Inspector | |
| 1987 | Uttar Dakshin | Varda Rai | |
| 1988 | Kharidaar | | |
| 1988 | Falak | Narang | |
| 1988 | Khatron Ke Khiladi | Ranbir | |
| 1988 | Kabzaa | Veljibhai Soda | |
| 1988 | Aakhri Adaalat | Girja Shankar | |
| 1988 | Sone Pe Suhaaga | Teja | |
| 1989 | Vardi | Rudra | |
| 1989 | Ram Lakhan | Bhanu Nath | |
| 1989 | Hathyaar | Rajan | |
| 1989 | Taaqatwar | Ganguram/Gangiya | |
| 1990 | Kafila | | |
| 1990 | Awaargi | Bhau | |
| 1990 | Jeevan Ek Sanghursh | Ratan Dholakia | |
| 1990 | Kroadh | Avasthi | |
| 1990 | Swarg | Dhanraj | |
| 1990 | Gunahon Ka Devta | Advocate | |
| 1990 | Zakhmi Zameen | Malhotrmeau | |
| 1991 | Kshana Kshanam | Nayar (Mastan) | Telugu film |
| 1991 | Saathi | Pasha | |
| 1991 | Haque | Shiva | |
| 1991 | Baharon Ki Manzil | | |
| 1991 | Do Pal | | |
| 1991 | Gunehgar Kaun | Jagira | |
| 1991 | Yodha | Chhaganlal | |
| 1991 | Fateh | Samrat | |
| 1991 | Ayee Milan Ki Raat | Yogiraj | |
| 1991 | Prem Qaidi | Prabhavati's Husband | Guest appearance |
| 1991 | Izzat | Minister Kishanlal Pandey | |
| 1991 | Pratikaar | Sajjan Srivastav | |
| 1991 | Shankara | Diwanji | |
| 1992 | Tilak | | |
| 1992 | Lambu Dada | Thakur Vikram Singh | |
| 1992 | Daulat Ki Jung | Haribhai | |
| 1992 | Karm Yoddha | Inspector Deshmukh | |
| 1992 | Adharm | Raghunath Verma | |
| 1992 | Virodhi | Badrinath Pandey | |
| 1992 | Jai Kaali | Purushotam Desi | |
| 1992 | Police Officer | Chimanlal | |
| 1992 | Zulm Ki Hukumat | Swami | |
| 1992 | Jeena Marna Tere Sang | Minister Hiralal | |
| 1992 | Dushman Zamana | D.K Narang Seema's Father | |
| 1992 | Jigar | Lal Bihari | |
| 1993 | Money | Subba Rao | Telugu film |
| 1993 | Maya Memsaab | Lalaji | |
| 1993 | Yugandhar | Kasturi Lala | |
| 1993 | Pehla Nasha | Inspector Mazumdar | |
| 1993 | King Uncle | Pratap | |
| 1993 | Phool Aur Angaar | Prof. and principal R. Kothari of City College | |
| 1993 | Roop Ki Rani Choron Ka Raja | Girdharilal | Special appearance |
| 1993 | Platform | Shetty Mudaliar / Shani Avatar | |
| 1993 | Pyar Pyar | Dhansukhbhai Dharamshi | |
| 1993 | Damini | Tolu Bajaj | |
| 1993 | Dil Ki Baazi | Santosh Kumar | |
| 1993 | Muqabla | Minister Jagannath Mishra | |
| 1993 | Kayda Kanoon | Kalika Prasad | |
| 1993 | Krishan Avtaar | J.D | |
| 1993 | Sir | Veljibhai | Filmfare Award for Best Villain |
| 1993 | Aadmi | Dhar Pakad Singh | |
| 1993 | Parwane | Naag Reddy | |
| 1994 | Aag Aur Chingari | | |
| 1994 | Aajaa Sanam | | |
| 1994 | Govinda Govinda | Paresh | Telugu film |
| 1994 | Woh Chokri | Lalit Ramji | National Film Award for Best Supporting Actor |
| 1994 | Sardar | Sardar Patel | |
| 1994 | Dilwale | Mama Thakur | |
| 1994 | Milan | Inspector Kotak | |
| 1994 | Laadla | Hiravat Bajaj | |
| 1994 | Andaz Apna Apna | Ram Gopal Bajaj / Shyam Gopal Bajaj (Teja) | |
| 1994 | Aa Gale Lag Jaa | Mamtaram Suraj's Uncle | |
| 1994 | Anth | Dabla, The Don | |
| 1994 | Ekka Raja Rani | Nageshwar Rao | |
| 1994 | Money Money | Subba Rao | Telugu film |
| 1994 | Mohra | Kashinath Sahu | Nominated—Filmfare Award for Best Comedian |
| 1994 | Juaari | Inspector Godbole | |
| 1994 | Krantiveer | Laxmidas Dayal | |
| 1994 | The Gentleman | Inspector | |
| 1995 | Nishana | Chheda | |
| 1995 | Vartman | | |
| 1995 | Rikshavodu | G. K. Rao | Telugu Film |
| 1995 | Ab To Jeene Do | | |
| 1995 | Baazi | Deputy Chaubey | |
| 1995 | Janam Kundli | Wong-Li | |
| 1995 | Raja | Brijnath/Birju Patangwala | Nominated—Filmfare Award for Best Supporting Actor |
| 1995 | Sanjay | Ranvir Singh | |
| 1995 | Akele Hum Akele Tum | Advocate Bhujbal | Special appearance |
| 1996 | Vijeta | Vidhya Sagar | |
| 1996 | Bandish | | |
| 1996 | Nirbhay | | |
| 1996 | Hahakar | | |
| 1996 | Rangbaaz | Bangura | |
| 1997 | Aar Ya Paar | Inspector Khan | |
| 1997 | Hero No. 1 | Dinanath Chauhan | |
| 1997 | Auzaar | Ram Thakur | |
| 1997 | Judaai | Hasmukhlal Bhagat | |
| 1997 | Tamanna | Tiku | |
| 1997 | Mrityudaata | T.T. | |
| 1997 | Zameer: The Awakening of a Soul | Raja Gajraj Singh | |
| 1997 | Mahaanta | Nanu Bhai Chatewala | |
| 1997 | Insaaf | Chiman Bhai | |
| 1997 | Gupt | Ishwar Diwan | |
| 1997 | Daud | Pinky | |
| 1997 | Mr. and Mrs. Khiladi | Pratap Hooda | |
| 1997 | Ghulam-E-Mustafa | Shanta Prasad/Abba | |
| 1997 | Qahar | Velji Patel | |
| 1997 | Chachi 420 | Hariharan/Haribhai | Nominated—Filmfare Award for Best Comedian |
| 1998 | Badmaash | Lalu Seth | |
| 1998 | Kabhi Na Kabhi | Kachra Seth | |
| 1998 | Dandnayak | Bankhelal Chaurasia | |
| 1998 | Bavagaru Bagunnara? | Rao Bahaddur Rajendra Prasad | Telugu Film |
| 1998 | Achanak | Saagar Srivastav | |
| 1998 | Satya | Commissioner | |
| 1998 | Angaaray | Jaggu Lokhande | |
| 1998 | Bade Miyan Chote Miyan | Zorawar Bhai | |
| 1998 | Hero Hindustani | Dadaji / Purshotam Harnam Agarwal | |
| 1998 | China Gate | Inspector Barot | |
| 1998 | Kudrat | Sukhiram | |
| 1999 | Aa Ab Laut Chalen | PC Jack Patel | |
| 1999 | Bade Dilwala | | |
| 1999 | Aarzoo | Kailashnath | |
| 1999 | Haseena Maan Jaayegi | Bhootnath | |
| 1999 | Hum Tum Pe Marte Hain | Shiv Kumar | |
| 1999 | Vaastav | Suleiman Bhai | |
| 1999 | Gair | Jagat Mama | |
| 1999 | Mechanic Mavayya | Sidhardha | Telugu film |
| 1999 | Khoobsurat | Jogia Seth | Special appearance |
| 2000 | Hadh Kar Di Aapne | Kailash Patel | |
| 2000 | Tera Jadoo Chal Gayaa | Gaffoor Bhai | |
| 2000 | Bulandi | Gora Thakur | |
| 2000 | Dulhan Hum Le Jayenge | Prabhu Nath | |
| 2000 | Phir Bhi Dil Hai Hindustani | Mohan Joshi | |
| 2000 | Hera Pheri | Baburao Ganpatrao Apte | Filmfare Award for Best Comedian |
| 2000 | Har Dil Jo Pyar Karega | Govardhan Singh | |
| 2000 | Deewane | Lekhraj | |
| 2001 | Love Ke Liye Kuch Bhi Karega | Narrator | |
| 2001 | Nayak | Suraj Bansal | |
| 2001 | Yeh Teraa Ghar Yeh Meraa Ghar | Inspector Otpal Yadav | Nominated—Filmfare Award for Best Comedian |
| 2001 | Moksha | Uncle Mamaji | Special appearance |
| 2002 | American Chai | Brijbhushan | |
| 2002 | Aankhen | Iliyaas | Nominated—Filmfare Award for Best Comedian |
| 2002 | Hum Kisise Kum Nahin | Commissioner | |
| 2002 | Awara Paagal Deewana | Manilal | Filmfare Award for Best Comedian |
| 2002 | Chor Machaaye Shor | ACP Ranvir Singh / Raghuswami | |
| 2002 | Kehta Hai Dil Baar Baar | Roger Patel | |
| 2003 | Dil Ka Rishta | Jai's Father | |
| 2003 | Pyasa Jism | | |
| 2003 | Hungama | Radheshyam Tiwari | Nominated—Filmfare Award for Best Comedian |
| 2003 | Baghban | Hemant Patel | |
| 2003 | Jodi Kya Banayi Wah Wah Ramji | Ramprasad | |
| 2003 | Aanch | Jawahar Pandit | |
| 2003 | Fun 2shh: Dudes in the 10th Century | John D'Souza | Nominated—Filmfare Award for Best Comedian |
| 2004 | Aan | Karim Khaled | |
| 2004 | Shankar Dada MBBS | Dr. Rama Lingeswara Rao "Lingam Mama" | Telugu film |
| 2004 | Aitraaz | Advocate | Cameo appearance |
| 2004 | Hulchul | Kishen / Murari Chand | Nominated—Filmfare Award for Best Comedian |
| 2005 | Bachke Rehna Re Baba | Monty Bagga | |
| 2005 | Garam Masala | Mambo | |
| 2005 | Deewane Huye Paagal | Tommy | |
| 2006 | Malamaal Weekly | Lilaram | |
| 2006 | 36 China Town | Natwarlal | |
| 2006 | Phir Hera Pheri | Baburao Ganpatrao Apte | Nominated—Filmfare Award for Best Comedian |
| 2006 | Chup Chup Ke | Gundya | |
| 2006 | Jaane Hoga Kya | Dr. Krishnan | |
| 2006 | Golmaal | Somnath Dubey | |
| 2006 | Yun Hota Toh Kya Hota | Rajubhai Patel | |
| 2006 | Bhagam Bhag | Champak Lal | |
| 2007 | Hat Trick | Hemu Patel | |
| 2007 | Fool & Final | Choubey | |
| 2007 | Cheeni Kum | Omprakash Verma | |
| 2007 | Good Boy, Bad Boy | Principal Diwan Chand Awasthi | |
| 2007 | Buddha Mar Gaya | Ramu | |
| 2007 | Bhool Bhulaiyaa | Batuk Shankar | |
| 2007 | No Smoking | Baba Bengali Sealdahwale | |
| 2007 | Welcome | Dr Dayal Ghungroo | |
| 2008 | One Two Three | Laxmi Narayan | |
| 2008 | Mere Baap Pehle Aap | Janardhan Vishvambhar Rane | |
| 2008 | Jaane Tu... Ya Jaane Na | Inspector P. K. Waghmare | Special appearance |
| 2008 | Mumbai Meri Jaan | Tukaram Patil | |
| 2008 | Maan Gaye Mughal-e-Azam | Uday Shankar Mazumdar | |
| 2008 | Oye Lucky! Lucky Oye! | Jani Singh / Gogi Arora / Dr. B. D. Handa | |
| 2008 | Maharathi | Subhash | |
| 2009 | Dhoondte Reh Jaoge | Raj Chopra | |
| 2009 | Firaaq | Sanjay | |
| 2009 | De Dana Dan | Harbans Chaddha | |
| 2009 | Paa | Ashutosh Arte | |
| 2009 | Radio | Jhandu Lal Tyagi | Special appearance |
| 2010 | Rann | Mohan Pandey | |
| 2010 | Road to Sangam | Hasmat Ullah | |
| 2010 | Atithi Tum Kab Jaoge? | Lambodar Chacha | |
| 2010 | Na Ghar Ke Na Ghaat Ke | Inspector Khote | |
| 2010 | Aakrosh | Ajatshatru Singh | |
| 2010 | No Problem | Zandulal | |
| 2011 | Theenmaar | Senapathi | Telugu Film |
| 2011 | Ready | CA Balidaan Bhardwaj / Balli | |
| 2012 | Will You Marry Me? | Gutka King (Sneha's Father) | Cameo |
| 2012 | Ferrari Ki Sawaari | D.N.Dharmadhikari | Cameo |
| 2012 | OMG | Kanji Lalji Mehta | |
| 2012 | Kamaal Dhamaal Malamaal | Peter | |
| 2012 | Khiladi 786 | | Narrator |
| 2013 | Table No. 21 | Abdul Razzaq Khan | |
| 2013 | Zilla Ghaziabad | Brahampal Singh Choudhary | |
| 2013 | Himmatwala | Narayandas | |
| 2013 | Rabba Main Kya Karoon | Mama | |
| 2014 | Raja Natwarlal | Yogi | |
| 2014 | Rang Rasiya | Seth Govardhan Das | Titled "Colors of Passion" in English |
| 2015 | Dharam Sankat Mein | Dharam Pal | |
| 2015 | Welcome Back | Dr Dayal Ghunghroo | |
| 2016 | Familywala | Bawa | |
| 2016 | Life Mein Hungama Hai | Truck Driver | |
| 2017 | Guest Iin London | Gangasharan Gandotra / Chachaji | |
| 2017 | Patel Ki Punjabi Shaadi | Hasmukh Patel | |
| 2017 | Tiger Zinda Hai | Firdauz / Tohbaan | |
| 2018 | Sanju | Sunil Dutt | |
| 2018 | Manto | Pimp | Special appearance |
| 2019 | Uri: The Surgical Strike | Govind Bhardwaj | |
| 2019 | Made in China | Tanmay Shah | Special appearance |
| 2020 | Soorarai Pottru | Paresh Goswami | Tamil film |
| 2020 | Coolie No. 1 | Jeffery Rozario | |
| 2021 | Toofaan | Coach Narayan "Nana" Prabhu | |
| 2021 | Hungama 2 | Radheshyam Tiwari | |
| 2021 | Hum Do Hamare Do | Purushottam Mishra | |
| 2022 | Dear Father | Manubhai Mankad | Gujarati film |
| 2022 | Sharmaji Namkeen | Brij Gopal Sharma "Sharmaji" | |
| 2022 | The Storyteller | Tarini Bandyopadhyay | |
| 2023 | Shehzada | Valmiki | |
| 2023 | Dream Girl 2 | Abu Saleem | |
| 2023 | Aankh Micholi | Navjot Singh | |
| 2023 | Shastry Viruddh Shastry | Manohar Shastry | |
| 2024 | Sarfira | Paresh Goswami | Nominated—Filmfare Award for Best Supporting Actor |
| 2024 | Jo Tera Hai Woh Mera Hai | Govinda Lal Mehta | |
| 2025 | Nikita Roy | Amar Dev | |
| 2025 | Ajey: The Untold Story of a Yogi | Mahant Avaidyanath | |
| 2025 | Thamma | Ram Bajaj Goyal | |
| 2025 | The Taj Story | Vishnu Das | |
| 2026 | Bhooth Bangla | Jagdish Manikchand Roopkamal Kewalramani | |
| 2026 | Maa Behen | Chandu Dwivedi | Special Appearance |
| 2026 | Welcome to the Jungle | Das | |
| 2026 | Badtameez Gill † | TBA | |
| 2026 | Tera Yaar Hoon Main | Vishwanath 'Vishu' Purohit | |

== See also ==
- List of awards and nominations received by Paresh Rawal
