= List of awards and nominations received by Paresh Rawal =

Paresh Rawal awards and nominations
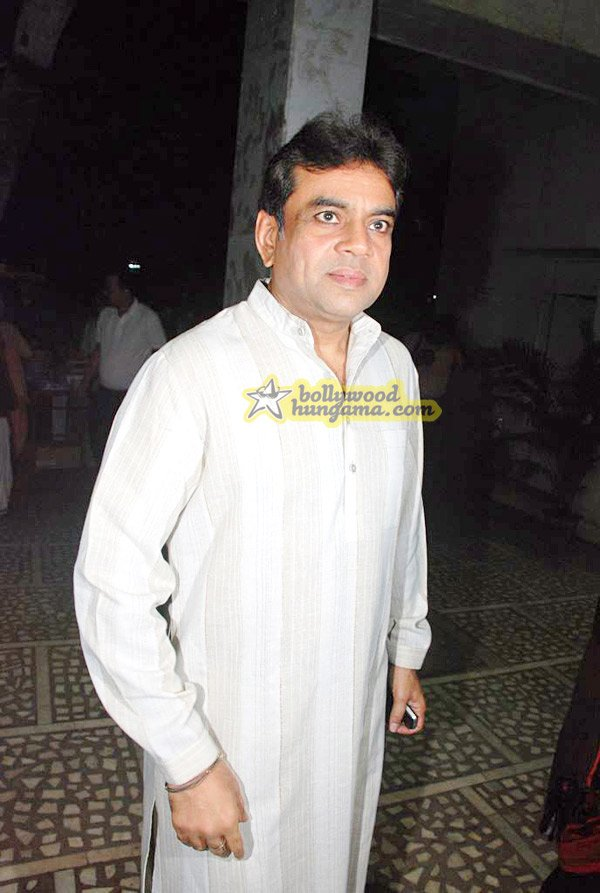
- Rawal in 1998
Awards and nominations
Award	Wins	Nominations

Totals (Note: Certain award groups do not simply award one winner. They acknowledge several different recipients, have runners-up, and have third place. Since this is a specific recognition and is different from losing an award, runner-up mentions are considered wins in this award tally. For simplification and to avoid errors, each award in this list has been presumed to have had a prior nomination.)
- Wins: 15
- Nominations: 24

Paresh Rawal (born 30 May 1955) is an Indian actor, film producer and politician known for his works primarily in Hindi films. He has appeared in over 240 films and is the recipient of various accolades. In 1994, he won the National Film Award for Best Supporting Actor for his performances in the films Woh Chokri and Sir. For the latter, he received his first Filmfare Award for Best Performance in a Negative Role. This was followed by Ketan Mehta's Sardar, which saw him playing the lead role of freedom fighter Vallabhbhai Patel, a role that got him national and international acclaim. He was honoured with Padma Shri from the Government of India in 2014.

His other notable works in Hindi cinema are Arjun (1985), Naam (1986), Shiva (1990), Mohra (1994), Tamanna (1996), China Gate (1998), Aitraaz (2004), Table No. 21 (2013) and Zilla Ghaziabad (2013). He has received recognition for his villainous roles in Telugu box office hits such as Kshana Kshanam (1991), Money (1993), Money Money (1995), Govinda Govinda (1994), Rikshavodu (1995), Bavagaru Bagunnara (1998).

Rawal has gained acclaim with comedy and few intense supporting roles in Hindi films as some of his notable roles are in Andaz Apna Apna (1994), Chachi 420 (1997), Hera Pheri (2000), Nayak (2001), Aankhen (2002), Awara Paagal Deewana (2002), Hungama (2003), Garam Masala (2005), Phir Hera Pheri (2006), Chup Chup Ke (2006), Malamaal Weekly (2006), Welcome (2007), Mere Baap Pehle Aap (2008), Oye Lucky! Lucky Oye! (2008), De Dana Dan (2009), Atithi Tum Kab Jaoge? (2010), Ready (2010), OMG (2012), Welcome Back (2015), Tiger Zinda Hai (2017), Sanju (2018), Uri (2019). His most remembered role is of Baburao Ganpatrao Apte in the cult classic Hera Pheri comedy franchise, and he also appeared in Tamil film Soorarai Pottru (2020).

== Civilian award ==
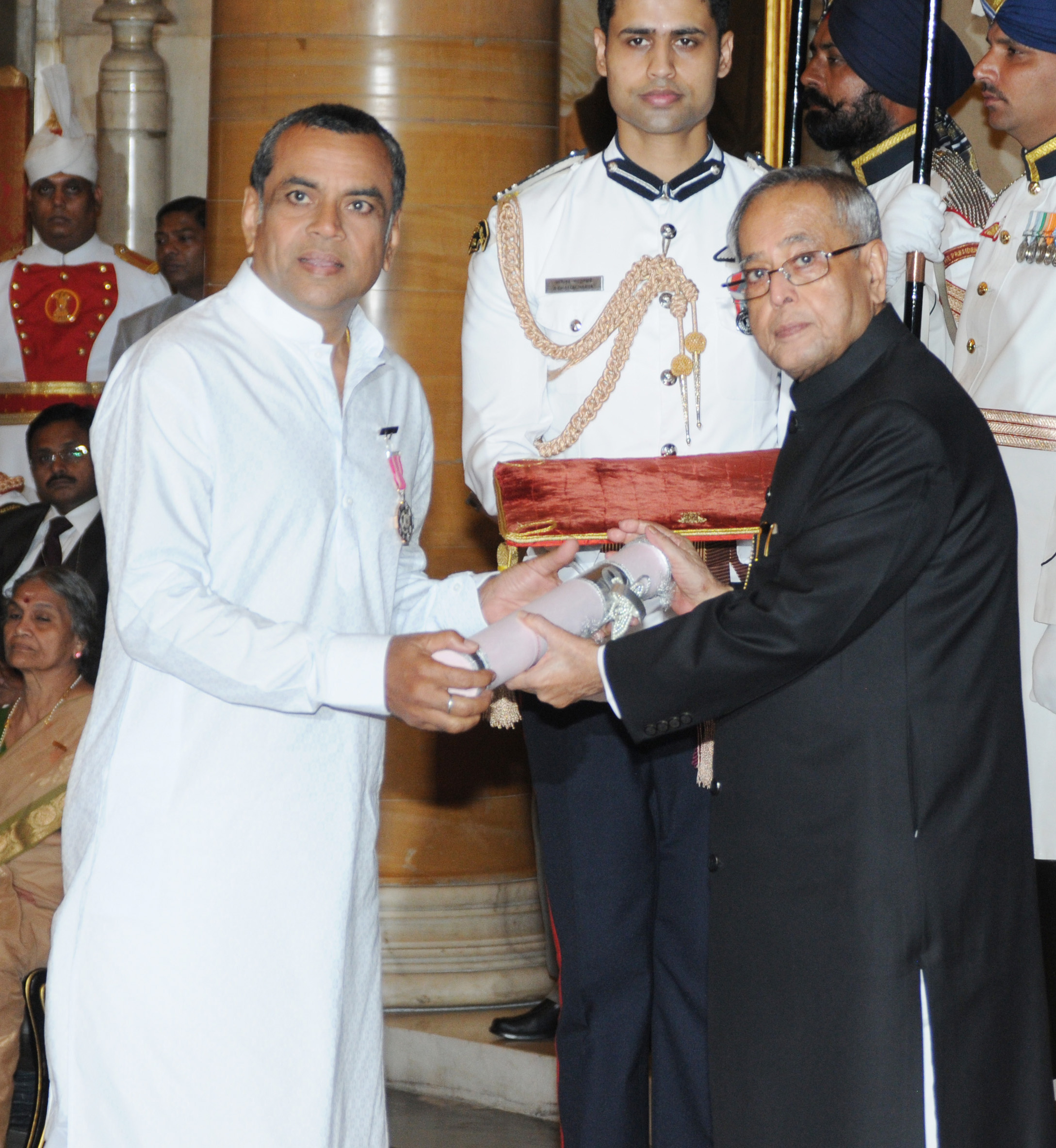
Rawal receiving the Padma Shri Award from the POI Pranab Mukherjee at an Investiture Ceremony-II at Rashtrapati Bhawan in New Delhi on 26 April 2014.

- In 2014, he was awarded the Padma Shri by the Government of India, the fourth highest civilian award in India, for his contributions to the entertainment industry.
- In 2018, he was awarded the Raj Kapoor Special Contribution Award by the Government of Maharashtra, for his contributions to the indian film industry.

== National Film Awards ==
- 1994: National Film Award for Best Supporting Actor for Sir and Woh Chokri

== Filmfare Awards ==
- 1994: Filmfare Award for Best Performance in a Negative Role for Sir
- 1995: Nominated–Filmfare Award for Best Performance in a Comic Role for Mohra
- 1994: Nominated–Filmfare Award for Best Supporting Actor for Raja
- 1998: Nominated–Filmfare Award for Best Performance in a Comic Role for Chachi 420
- 2001: Filmfare Award for Best Performance in a Comic Role for Hera Pheri
- 2002: Nominated–Filmfare Award for Best Performance in a Comic Role for Yeh Teraa Ghar Yeh Meraa Ghar
- 2003: Nominated–Filmfare Award for Best Performance in a Comic Role for Aankhen
- 2003: Filmfare Award for Best Performance in a Comic Role for Awara Paagal Deewana
- 2004: Nominated–Filmfare Award for Best Performance in a Comic Role for Fun 2shh: Dudes in the 10th Century
- 2004: Nominated–Filmfare Award for Best Performance in a Comic Role for Hungama
- 2005: Nominated–Filmfare Award for Best Performance in a Comic Role for Hulchul
- 2007: Nominated–Filmfare Award for Best Performance in a Comic Role for Phir Hera Pheri
- 2025: Nominated–Filmfare Award for Best Supporting Actor for Sarfira

== IIFA Awards ==
- 2001: Nominated–IIFA Award for Best Supporting Actor for Har Dil Jo Pyar Karega
- 2001: IIFA Award for Best Performance in a Comic Role for Hera Pheri
- 2004: Nominated–IIFA Award for Best Performance in a Comic Role for Hungama & Baghban
- 2005: Nominated–IIFA Award for Best Supporting Actor for Aitraaz
- 2005: Nominated–IIFA Award for Best Performance in a Comic Role for Hulchul
- 2007: Nominated–IIFA Award for Best Performance in a Comic Role for Phir Hera Pheri
- 2008: Nominated–IIFA Award for Best Performance in a Comic Role for Bhool Bhulaiyaa
- 2009: Nominated–IIFA Award for Best Performance in a Negative Role for Oye Lucky! Lucky Oye!
- 2011: Nominated–IIFA Award for Best Supporting Actor for Atithi Tum Kab Jaoge?
- 2012: Nominated–IIFA Award for Best Performance in a Comic Role for Ready
- 2013: Nominated–IIFA Award for Best Performance in a Comic Role for OMG – Oh My God!

Star Screen Awards

- 1996: Screen Award for Best Supporting Actor for Raja
- 2001: Screen Award for Best Comedian for Hera Pheri
- 2002: Nominated–Screen Award for Best Comedian for Aankhen
- 2003: Screen Award for Best Comedian for Awara Paagal Deewana

== Zee Cine Awards ==
- 2001: Zee Cine Award for Best Actor in a Comic Role for Hera Pheri
- 2003: Zee Cine Award for Best Actor in a Comic Role for Awara Paagal Deewana
- 2010: Nominated–Zee Cine Award for Best Actor in a Comic Role for Atithi Tum Kab Jaoge?
- 2010: Nominated–Zee Cine Award for Best Actor in a Negative Role for Aakrosh

Producers Guild Film Awards

- 2010: Producers Guild Film Award for Best Actor in a Comic Role for Atithi Tum Kab Jaoge?
- 2012: Nominated–Producers Guild Film Award for Best Actor in a Comic Role for Ready

Bollywood Movie Awards

- 2001: Bollywood Movie Award for Best Comedian for Hera Pheri
- 2004: Bollywood Movie Award for Best Comedian for Hungama

Other Awards

2006: Sardar Patel International Award for Best Actor for Sardar (1993).

== See also ==
- Paresh Rawal filmography
