= Hera Pheri =

Hera Pheri is a term meaning "wrongdoing' or "monkey business" in Hindi and may refer to these Indian films:

- Hera Pheri (1976 film), a 1976 Hindi film directed by Prakash Mehra
- Hera Pheri (TV series), a 1999 comedy series starring Shekhar Suman and Rakhi Vijan|Rakhi Tandon
- Hera Pheri (film series), a series of Indian comedy films
  - Hera Pheri (2000 film), a Hindi comedy directed by Priyadarshan, first in the series
  - Phir Hera Pheri, a 2006 film directed by Neeraj Vora, second in the series
  - Hera Pheri 3, an upcoming film, third in the series
  - Hera Pheri, a 2016 Indian Bengali-language remake by Sujit Guha

== See also ==
- Monkey Business (disambiguation)
