= Pradhan Mantri (TV series) =

- Also known as: Pradhan Mantri Time Bomb
- Genre: Political Thriller
- Directed by: Ketan Mehta
- Starring: See below
- Opening theme: Pradhan Mantri
- Country of origin: India
- No. of episodes: 13

Production
- Camera setup: Multi-cam
- Running time: 40 minutes

Original release
- Network: Zee TV
- Release: 6 April – 29 June 2001

Pradhan Mantri (translation: Prime Minister) is an hour long weekly TV program broadcast on Zee TV in 2001. The show was conceptualized by well known editor-journalist M.J. Akbar and directed by Ketan Mehta and Shrivallabh Vyas.

== Cast ==
- Kay Kay Menon as The Prime Minister of India Anirudh Prakash
- Shrivallabh Vyas as Member of parliament Mr. Gupt
- as Savita Ganpati, I&B Minister
- Anupam Shyam as Ramji Yadav, one of the MP and HRD Minister
- Achyut Potdar as The President of India
