= Monkey Business =

Monkey Business may refer to:

== Film and television ==
- Monkey Business (1925 film), a Krazy Kat cartoon
- Monkey Business (1926 film), an Our Gang comedy
- Monkey Business (1931 film), a Marx Brothers comedy
- Monkey Business (1952 film), directed by Howard Hawks with Cary Grant
- Monkey Business (2022 film), directed by Daniel Guzmán
- Monkey Business (TV series), a British documentary series
- Hera Pheri (disambiguation) (Monkey Business), any of several Indian films
- "Monkey Business", an episode of Californication

== Music ==
- Monkey Business (band), a Czech funk band
- Monkey Business (Black Eyed Peas album), 2005
- Monkey Business (Margaret album), 2017
- "Monkey Business" (Skid Row song), 1991
- "Monkey Business" (Michael Jackson song), released 2004
- "Monkey Business", a song by Nik Kershaw on the album Human Racing
- "Monkey Business", a song by Pain on the album Cynic Paradise
- "Monkey Business", a song by Danger Danger on the album Screw It!
- "Monkey Business", a song by Pet Shop Boys on the album Hotspot

== Other ==
- Monkey Business (yacht), which gained notoriety during the 1987 Gary Hart political scandal
- "Monkey Business" (short story), by P. G. Wodehouse
- Monkey Business (play), a 2025 Pakistani farce
- Monkey Business, a 1987 children's book by Mark Burgess
- (monkey) Business, the original name of OG, a Dota 2 esports team

== See also ==
- "Monkey Bizness", a recurring comic strip in The Dandy magazine
- "Too Much Monkey Business", a 1956 song by Chuck Berry, covered by several artists
- Unfinished Monkey Business, a 1998 album by Ian Brown
