= Once Upon a Time in Mumbaai (soundtrack) =

Once Upon a Time in Mumbaai (Original Motion Picture Soundtrack)

Soundtrack album by Pritam
- Released: 29 June 2010
- Recorded: 2010
- Genre: Feature film soundtrack
- Length: 47:32
- Language: Hindi
- Label: T-Series
- Producer: Balaji Motion Pictures

Pritam chronology
Khatta Meetha (2010)	Once Upon a Time in Mumbaai (Original Motion Picture Soundtrack) (2010)	Aashayein (2010)

Once Upon a Time in Mumbaai (Original Motion Picture Soundtrack) is the soundtrack album accompanying the 2010 film of the same name directed by Milan Luthria. The film's soundtrack featured 11 songs composed by Pritam with lyrics written by Irshad Kamil, Neelesh Misra and Amitabh Bhattacharya. The soundtrack was released under the T-Series label on 29 June 2010 to positive reviews from critics.

== Background ==
The film's music is composed by Pritam in his second collaboration with Luthria after Hattrick (2007). The soundtrack consisted of five original songs—"Tum Jo Aaye Zindagi Mein", "Pee Loon", "I Am in Love", "Parda" and "Baburao Mast Hai". Neelesh Misra wrote lyrics for "I Am In Love" and Amitabh Bhattacharya did the same for "Baburao Mast Hai", while Irshad Kamil wrote the remainder of it. "Tum Jo Aaye Zindagi Mein", "Pee Loon" and "Parda" had alternative versions, with "Pee Loon" having a remix version performed by DJ A-myth. Rahat Fateh Ali Khan, Tulsi Kumar, Mohit Chauhan, Karthik, Sunidhi Chauhan, Rana Mazumder, Mika Singh, KK, Dominique Cerejo performed the vocals. The soundtrack was released under the T-Series label on 29 June 2010.

== Reception ==
A reviewer from Hindustan Times wrote "On the whole, the album impresses and will appeal to music lovers" and rated three out of five stars. Beenish Mirza of Music Aloud gave 8/10 and said "The album has been worth the wait, for just Pee Loon, Tum Jo Aaye Reprise and I am in Love (2 versions); These in themselves provide a wholesome musical experience." Karthik Srinivasan of Milliblog wrote "Average soundtrack propped by two stand-out songs". Joginder Tuteja of Bollywood Hungama wrote "Once Upon A Time In Mumbaai throws a surprise, a mighty pleasant one at that [...] Once the initial inhibition about the album offering only gangster score settles down and the fact emerges that there are quite a few love songs on the offing as well, Once Upon A Time In Mumbaai should enjoy a long innings ahead." Gaurav Malani of The Economic Times wrote "Pritam's soothing tunes 'Pee Loo' and 'Tum Jo Aaye' and the R.D.Burman styled cabaret number 'Parda' are chartbuster material."

== Track listing ==
Once Upon a Time in Mumbaai (Original Motion Picture Soundtrack) track listing
No.	Title	Lyrics	Singer(s)	Length
1.	"Tum Jo Aaye Zindagi Mein"	Irshad Kamil	Rahat Fateh Ali Khan, Tulsi Kumar	4:48
2.	"Pee Loon" (Male)	Irshad Kamil	Mohit Chauhan	4:48
3.	"I Am in Love" (Male)	Neelesh Misra	Karthik	5:02
4.	"Parda"	Irshad Kamil	Sunidhi Chauhan, Rana Mazumder	5:23
5.	"Baburao Mast Hai"	Amitabh Bhattacharya	Mika Singh	4:49
6.	"Tum Jo Aaye Zindagi Mein" (Reprise)	Irshad Kamil	Rahat Fateh Ali Khan	4:30
7.	"I Am in Love" (Reprise)	Neelesh Misra	KK, Dominique Cerejo	4:47
8.	"Pee Loon" (Female)	Irshad Kamil	Tulsi Kumar	1:45
9.	"Pee Loon" (remixed by DJ A-myth)	Irshad Kamil	Mohit Chauhan	4:09
10.	"I Am in Love" (dance version)	Neelesh Misra	KK, Dominique Cerejo	5:29
11.	"I Am in Love" (Female)	Neelesh Misra	Tulsi Kumar	2:02
Total length:				47:32

== Awards and nominations ==
Awards and nominations for Once Upon a Time in Mumbaai (Original Motion Picture Soundtrack)
Award (Note: Awards, festivals and organizations are in Alphabetical order.)	Date of ceremony (Note: Date is linked to the article about the awards held that year, wherever possible.)	Category	Recipient(s)	Result	Ref.
BIG Star Entertainment Awards	21 December 2010	Most Entertaining Music	Pritam	Nominated	
BIG Star Entertainment Awards	21 December 2010	Most Entertaining Singer – Male	Mohit Chauhan ("Pee Loon")	Nominated	
BIG Star Entertainment Awards	21 December 2010	Most Entertaining Singer – Female	Tulsi Kumar ("Tum Jo Aaye")	Nominated	
BIG Star Entertainment Awards	21 December 2010	Most Entertaining Song	"Pee Loon"	Nominated	
Filmfare Awards	29 January 2011	Best Music Director	Pritam	Nominated	
Filmfare Awards	29 January 2011	Best Male Playback Singer	Mohit Chauhan ("Pee Loon")	Nominated	
Global Indian Music Academy Awards	30 October 2011	Best Film Album	Once Upon a Time in Mumbaai	Nominated	
Global Indian Music Academy Awards	30 October 2011	Best Music Director	Pritam	Nominated	
Global Indian Music Academy Awards	30 October 2011	Best Background Score	Sandeep Shirodkar	Nominated	
Global Indian Music Academy Awards	30 October 2011	Best Lyricist	Irshad Kamil ("Pee Loon")	Won	
Global Indian Music Academy Awards	30 October 2011	Best Male Playback Singer	Mohit Chauhan ("Pee Loon")	Won	
Global Indian Music Academy Awards	30 October 2011	Best Music Arranger and Programmer	Sandeep Shirodkar ("Pee Loon")	Won	
Global Indian Music Academy Awards	30 October 2011	Best Engineer – Film Album	Eric Pillai	Nominated	
Global Indian Music Academy Awards	30 October 2011	Best Film Song	"Pee Loon"	Won	
Global Indian Music Academy Awards	30 October 2011	MTV Hot Pick of The Year	"Tum Jo Aaye"	Won	
International Indian Film Academy Awards	23–25 June 2011	Best Music Director	Pritam	Nominated	
International Indian Film Academy Awards	23–25 June 2011	Best Lyricist	Irshad Kamil ("Pee Loon")	Nominated	
International Indian Film Academy Awards	23–25 June 2011	Best Male Playback Singer	Mohit Chauhan ("Pee Loon")	Nominated	
Mirchi Music Awards	27 January 2011	Album of The Year	Pritam, Irshad Kamil, Neelesh Misra & Amitabh Bhattacharya	Nominated	
Mirchi Music Awards	27 January 2011	Music Composer of The Year	Pritam	Nominated	
Mirchi Music Awards	27 January 2011	Male Vocalist of The Year	Mohit Chauhan ("Pee Loon")	Nominated	
Mirchi Music Awards	27 January 2011	Raag-Inspired Song of the Year	"Tum Jo Aaye"	Nominated	
Mirchi Music Awards	27 January 2011	Best Item Song of the Year	"Parda Parda"	Nominated	
Mirchi Music Awards	27 January 2011	Listeners' Choice Album of the Year	Once Upon a Time in Mumbaai	Won	
Producers Guild Film Awards (Note: Previously known as Apsara Film & Television Producers Guild Awards.)	11 January 2011	Best Music Director	Pritam	Nominated	
Producers Guild Film Awards	11 January 2011	Best Lyricist	Irshad Kamil ("Pee Loon")	Nominated	
Producers Guild Film Awards	11 January 2011	Best Male Playback Singer	Mohit Chauhan ("Pee Loon")	Nominated	
Producers Guild Film Awards	11 January 2011	Best Female Playback Singer	Tulsi Kumar ("Tum Jo Aaye")	Nominated	
Screen Awards	6 January 2011	Best Music Director	Pritam	Nominated	
Screen Awards	6 January 2011	Most Popular Music	Pritam	Won	
Screen Awards	6 January 2011	Best Lyricist	Irshad Kamil ("Pee Loon")	Nominated	
Screen Awards	6 January 2011	Best Male Playback Singer	Mohit Chauhan ("Pee Loon")	Nominated	
Zee Cine Awards	14 January 2011	Best Music Director	Pritam	Nominated	
Zee Cine Awards	14 January 2011	Best Lyricist	Irshad Kamil ("Pee Loon")	Nominated	
Zee Cine Awards	14 January 2011	Best Lyricist	Irshad Kamil ("Tum Jo Aaye")	Nominated	
Zee Cine Awards	14 January 2011	Best Playback Singer – Male	Mohit Chauhan ("Pee Loon")	Won	
Zee Cine Awards	14 January 2011	Best Playback Singer – Female	Tulsi Kumar ("Tum Jo Aaye")	Nominated	
Zee Cine Awards	14 January 2011	Best Editing	Akiv Ali	Nominated	
Zee Cine Awards	14 January 2011	Best Track of the Year	"Pee Loon"	Won	
Zee Cine Awards	14 January 2011	Sa Re Ga Ma Pa – Song of the Year	"Pee Loon"	Nominated	
