= Baburao Ganpatrao Apte =

Fictional character

- Hera Pheri character
- First appearance: Hera Pheri; (2000)
- Last appearance: Phir Hera Pheri; (2006)
- Portrayed by: Paresh Rawal

In-universe information
- Full name: Baburao Ganpatrao Apte
- Nickname: Babu Bhaiya
- Gender: Male
- Significant others: Raju; Shyam
- Nationality: Indian

Baburao Ganpatrao Apte (Indian English: [ˈbɑː.buː.raʊ ɡənˈpət.raʊ ˈʌp.ʈe]), better known as Babu Bhaiya, is a fictional character in the Indian Hindi-language comedy film series Hera Pheri, played by Paresh Rawal. Introduced in Hera Pheri (2000) and reprised in Phir Hera Pheri (2006), Baburao has been described by several critics as one of Bollywood's most recognizable comedic characters, noted for his Marathi-accented dialogue, distinctive mannerisms, and frequently quoted lines. Film critics have credited Rawal’s performance with helping establish the Hera Pheri franchise's enduring popularity.

== Inspiration ==
Baburao was loosely inspired by Mannar Mathai from the Malayalam film Ramji Rao Speaking (1989), which Hera Pheri remade. His Marathi identity and exaggerated mannerisms were modeled after Rajat Dholakia, a Gujarati theatre personality, with Paresh Rawal's Marathi theatre background enhancing the character’s authenticity.

== Role ==
=== Hera Pheri (2000) ===
In the film Hera Pheri, directed by Priyadarshan, Baburao is a middle-class Maharashtrian landlord who is short-tempered, near-sighted, and constantly drunk. He runs a garage called Star Garage. He rents out rooms to Shyam and Raju, two men struggling with their own problems. Baburao is already dealing with financial troubles and unpaid rent when a wrong-number phone call changes everything.

The call, meant for a seafood company called "Star Fisheries," is from a criminal gang led by Kabira. They've kidnapped a girl and are demanding ransom from her grandfather, Devi Prasad. Because of a misprint in the phone directory, the call ends up at Baburao's garage. Raju sees this as a chance to make money and convinces Baburao and Shyam to pretend to be the kidnappers and demand double the ransom–₹40 lakhs–so they can pay off their debts and still save the girl.

Although Baburao is initially reluctant, he agrees to the plan. As events escalate, his character often acts as a mediator between Shyam and Raju. Despite his outbursts and drinking habits, he demonstrates concern for his friends throughout the film.

In the end, Baburao helps rescue the kidnapped girl and gets a share of the reward money. His character, though funny and flawed, plays a big part in the film's heart and success.

=== Phir Hera Pheri (2006) ===
In Phir Hera Pheri, Baburao Ganpatrao Apte is still the eccentric, near-sighted, and often drunk garage owner and now living a lavish life with Raju and Shyam after their success in the first film. Though he enjoys the comforts of wealth, Baburao remains clueless about finances and easily swayed. When Raju introduces a scheme to double their money in 21 days, Baburao agrees to invest ₹30 lakhs and even supports selling their bungalow to raise more funds. Trusting Raju's confidence, he unknowingly walks into a scam that wipes out all their savings.

After losing everything, the trio is forced to move into a chawl. Baburao, now back in poverty, gets caught up in a series of chaotic events involving gangsters, stolen drugs, and antique guns. As they try to repay a dangerous gangster named Tiwari, Baburao–despite not fully understanding the situation–joins Raju and Shyam in a desperate plan to recover their losses. His frequent confusion and impulsive decisions contribute to the film’s comedic situations, while his loyalty to his friends remains consistent throughout the story.

The story builds to a wild climax at a circus, where Baburao accidentally reveals that the money they tried to use was fake, triggering a massive chase involving multiple gangs, stolen diamonds, and even a gorilla. In the end, while most of the criminals are arrested, Baburao escapes with his friends. The film closes on a cliffhanger, with Baburao and Shyam trying to stop Raju from unknowingly throwing away antique guns worth crores–once again leaving their fate hanging by a thread.

== Legacy ==
Several critics have highlighted Baburao as one of Bollywood's most memorable comedic characters, with Paresh Rawal's portrayal receiving positive reviews. Soumya Rao of Scroll.in labeled Baburao "inimitable," and praised Rawal's performance. Mimansa Shekhar of The Indian Express described Baburao as "the soul of this sleeper hit." Baburao ranked first in the Filmfare's list most memorable roles of Rawal. The character ranked ninth in the Bollywood's 20 best characters by NDTV.

In Hera Pheri, Baburao's confusion, reactions to wrong-number calls, and lines such as "Yeh Baburao ka style hai" (This is Baburao's style) contribute to the film’s comedic tone. Indian cricketer Suryakumar Yadav mimicked this dialogue on The Kapil Sharma Show. Dialogues like "Utha le re deva," (God, just take me now!)", "Khopdi tod, khopdi tod saale ka" (Break his skull, break that scoundrel’s head!) and "Muh se supari nikal ke baat kar re baba" (Take the betel nut out of your mouth and speak properly, man!) have been widely cited and referenced in popular culture, including internet memes. His character was played by Naresh in Hera Pheri's Telugu remake Dhanalakshmi I Love You.

Mika Singh has paid tribute to the character in the songs "Ganpath" from Shootout at Lokhandwala and "Baburao Mast Hai" from Once Upon a Time in Mumbaai.

== Future appearances ==
The third installment Hera Pheri 3 was officially announced on 30 January 2025, when director Priyadarshan hinted at the project on his birthday and invited Akshay Kumar, Suniel Shetty, and Paresh Rawal to reunite for the third installment. Akshay responded positively, calling it the best birthday gift. The film is expected to begin production by late 2025, with a tentative release planned before 2026.

Paresh Rawal initially exited the project in May 2025. He cited the absence of a finalized script, production schedule, and long-form agreement as his reasons for stepping away. In a public statement, he clarified that his decision was not due to creative differences, saying, "There are no creative disagreements. I have immense love and respect for Priyadarshan." He added, "When people have loved something so much, you have to be extra careful. You can’t take things for granted. Mehnat karke unko do (Put in the effort and give it to them)."

After Rawal's departure from the project, Akshay Kumar, producing Hera Pheri 3 under Cape of Good Films, issued a legal notice seeking ₹25 crore in damages, alleging breach of contract. The notice stated that Rawal had accepted an advance payment and participated in preliminary production discussions before his exit. Rawal’s representatives contested these claims, asserting that the producers had not fulfilled agreed-upon terms.

His return was confirmed on 30 June 2025, during a podcast with Himanshu Mehta. Rawal revealed that the issues had been resolved thanks to the personal efforts of Akshay Kumar, Sajid Nadiadwala, and Ahmed Khan. He returned the ₹11 lakh signing amount with 15% interest before rejoining the cast.
