= Pankaj Advani (director) =

Indian film director (1965–2010)

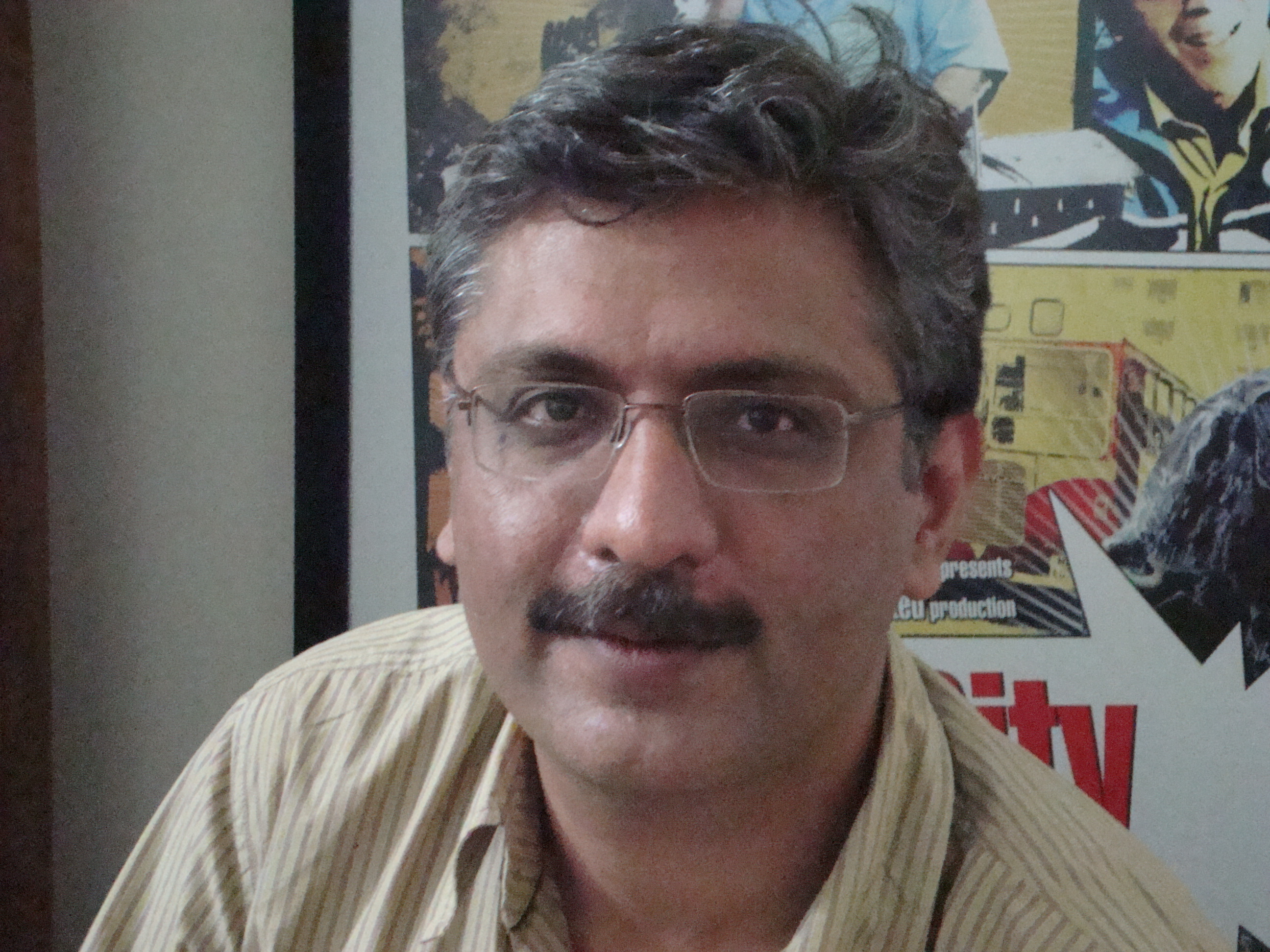
- Born: 1 August 1965; Lucknow, Uttar Pradesh, India
- Died: 11 November 2010 (aged 45); Mumbai, India
- Occupations: Film director screenwriter

Pankaj Advani (Hindi: पंकज आडवाणी) (1 August 1965 – 11 November 2010) was an Indian film director, editor, screenwriter, photographer, theatre director, and painter, known for his works in Bollywood, and cross over cinema. Pankaj made his Hindi film screenwriting debut with Kabhi Haan Kabhi Naa (1993) which went on to win the Filmfare Critics Award for Best Movie.

In 1994, he scripted, and directed the short film Sunday which won the Children's Film Society of India Award for best writing, and the National Film Award for Best Short Fiction Film. The film was screened at the Indian Panorama Section of the 25th International Film Festival of India, Calcutta; the Asian Panorama section of 8th International Children's Film Festival, Udaipur; and has participated in other festivals including Cairo International Children's Film Festival and 11th Annual Chicago International Children's Film Festival. The same year Pankaj won an award for best writing for Shadow Boxer at NFDC.

== Early life and education ==
Pankaj was born in Lucknow and grew up in Veraval in the Saurashtra region of Gujarat state. As a young boy he was drawn to the magical world of cinema and as a first step wrote, acted, and directed for his school plays.

He obtained his Bachelor of Fine Arts Degree in painting from the Maharaja Sayajirao University of Baroda. At the Faculty of Fine Arts, he specialized in photography and built up a portfolio of photographs. While in Baroda he participated in playwright and film-maker, Habib Tanvir's workshop. He wrote and directed black comedies under his supervision (Andher Nagari and others) that participated in college festivals. He then went on to do his Diploma in Editing at the Film and Television Institute of India-Pune, receiving a merit scholarship for his academic excellence.

== Film craft ==
After graduating from FTII-Pune, Pankaj returned to Baroda and put up a theatrical production of his black comedy Kataria Gul Hui Gawa. Pankaj's next attempt was a short film Highway (19-minute video shot in Baroda about a woman who asks for a lift from a stranger in a car on a deserted highway) which participated in the South Asian Short Film Festival in Colombo and the International Short and Independent Film Festival-Dhaka.

Pankaj faced many hurdles in garnering funds for his unconventional films but continued to work even with low budgets. He forayed into TV when Shashanka Ghosh, the then head of Channel [V], who, impressed with his film Sunday and 'quirky' ideas created a tiny space for him in the channel for experimentation, starting off with the promo the dark 'Anarkali Petticoat Show' which got a special mention at the Promax Awards and subsequent shows like the iconic Toofan TV and Bheja Fry. His long association with Channel [V] provided him with a platform to showcase his creative ideas albeit on very low budgets.

In 2000 Pankaj received a '1.3 million – 13 days no-holds barred on creative aspect' offer from Digital Talkies which he grabbed and gave birth to the now iconoclastic, underground, cult classic Urf Professor. This black comedy got the Best Film Award at the International Digital Film Festival India and best editing at KaraFilm Fest (Pakistan). It screened at Dahlonega Film Festival; Philippines Digital Film; and participated in Inscreen International Film Festival (July 2006). With support of Shekhar Kapur (guest of honour at International Digital Film Festival of India); Pankaj, Roger Savage (sound engineer, Moulin Rouge), and Jill Billcock (editor, Moulin Rouge) collaborated at 'Sound Firm', Australia, to make a version more suited for an English-speaking audience; the effort came to a naught. It could not get certification from the Censor Board in India for its explicit content.

Shripal Morakia of iDream Production gave him a chance to make his stylised, surreal, psychological thriller Cape Karma. Cape Karma, shot in the winter of 2005 in Dundee, Scotland with its non-linear story telling and undercurrents of violence and disconcerting sexual theme proved to be much ahead of its times for an Indian audience and is one of Pankaj's least-seen films. Pankaj's only film to be released commercially in theatres was Sankat City presented by Moser-Baer in July 2009. Bollywood, too, gave its approval and this poorly publicized film got due credit with nominations in half-a-dozen categories coming its way at the Nokia 16th Star Screen Awards 2010, Max Stardust Awards 2010, and 55th Filmfare Awards.

== Awards ==
National Film Awards

- 1994: National Film Award for Best Short Fiction Film (Director) for Sunday

International honors

- 2001: Best Film at the International Digital Film Festival, India for Urf Professor
- 2003: Best Editing at Kara Film Festival, Karachi, Pakistan for Urf Professor

Other honors

- 2010: Honorable Member of Animation Jury at the 20th Cairo International Children's Film Festival in 2010.

== Filmography ==
| Year | Film | Credit |
|---|---|---|
| 2010 | The Pinocchio effect | Editor |
| 2009 | Sankat City | Director, writer |
| 2006 | Naina | Consulting Editor |
| 2005 | Cape Karma | Director, writer |
| 2001 | Urf Professor | Director, editor, writer, and Associate Producer |
| 1996 | Loveria (unreleased) | co-writer |
| 1993 | Sunday | Director, editor, writer, and Executive Producer |
| 1993 | Kabhi Haan Kabhi Naa | Co-writer. (Story and Screenplay) |

=== Short films ===
| Year | Film | Credit |
|---|---|---|
| 1992 | Highway | Director, Writer, producer |

=== Music Videos ===
| Year | Song | Credit |
|---|---|---|
| 2000 | Kal ki haseen mulaqat remix | Director, Writer, producer |

=== TV ===
| Year | Title | Credit |
|---|---|---|
| 1998 | Bheja Fry- Channel [V] | Director, writer |
| 1997 | Toofan TV-Channel [V] | Director, writer |
| 1995 | Aan Ban & Break Ke Baad [Zee Cinema] (film based shows) | Director, writer, editor |
| 1994 | Photo studio [BiTV] | Director, writer |

=== Documentary ===
| Year | Title | Credit |
|---|---|---|
| 1997 | V.K.Krishnamenon by G.Aravindan | Editor |

=== Theatre ===
| Year | Title | Credit |
|---|---|---|
| 1989 | Kataria Gul Hui Gawa | Director, writer, producer |

== Death ==
On 11 November 2010, Pankaj Advani died of sudden cardiac arrest in Mumbai, India age 45.
