= Sankat City =

- Theatrical Poster
- Directed by: Pankaj Advani
- Written by: Pankaj Advani
- Produced by: MoserBaer Entertainment Ltd. and 7 Entertainment Ltd.
- Starring: Kay Kay Menon; Anupam Kher; Rimi Sen; Chunky Panday; Dilip Prabhavalkar
- Cinematography: Chirantan Das
- Music by: Ranjit Barot
- Release date: 10 July 2009
- Running time: 120 minutes
- Country: India
- Language: Hindi

Sankat City (transl. City of Troubles) is a 2009 Indian Hindi-language black comedy film directed by Pankaj Advani starring Kay Kay Menon. The film was released in India on 10 July 2009.

== Plot ==
Guru (Kay Kay Menon) and Ganpat (Dilip Prabhavalkar) are small-time car thieves. One night, they steal a Mercedes-Benz Rs. 10 million inside, unaware that the car belongs to a vicious gangster/loan shark called Faujdaar (Anupam Kher). They try to sell the stolen Mercedes to Suleman Supari (Rahul Dev), a hitman, who recognizes the car and notifies his friend Faujdaar. Faujdaar sends his henchman with Guru to get back the cash.

Meanwhile, Ganpat has hidden cash in a safe place. After an accident, he loses his memory. Angered by the chain of events, Faujdaar gives Guru three days to return the money.

== Cast ==
- Kay Kay Menon - Guru
- Anupam Kher - Faujdar
- Rimi Sen - Mona
- Chunky Panday - Sikandar Khan and Sheshaiyya (Dual role)
- Dilip Prabhavalkar - Ganpat
- Rahul Dev - Suleman Supari
- Yashpal Sharma - Pachisia
- Hemant Pandey - Filip Fattu
- Veerendra Saxena - Godman
- Shrivallabh Vyas - Sharafat
- Manoj Pahwa - Gogi Kukreja
- Kurush Deboo - Bawajee
- Sanjay Mishra - Lingam

== Soundtrack ==
The music was composed by Ranjit Barot and released by Venus Worldwide Entertainment. All lyrics were written by Panchhi Jalonvi and Mehboob.

Sankat City

Soundtrack album by Ranjit Barot
- Released: 2009
- Recorded: 2009
- Genre: Soundtrack
- Length: 22:58
- Label: Venus Worldwide Entertainment
- Producer: Ranjit Barot

Ranjit Barot chronology
'Mere Baap Pehle Aap' (2008)	Sankat City (2009)	'Toss' (2009)

Track list
No.	Title	Singer(s)	Length
1.	"Mumbai One Way Nagri Hai"	Sukhwinder Singh, Ranjit Barot	3:50
2.	"Ghoom Ghoom"	Roop Kumar Rathod, June Banerjee, Ranjit Barot	3:49
3.	"Sha La La (She Is A Bad Girl)"	Ranjit Barot	4:17
4.	"Mister Hua Hai Aisa Hal Kyun"	June Banerjee	4:14
5.	"Mister Hua Hai Aisa Hal Kyon" (Remix)	June Banerjee	6:48
Total length:			22:58

== Critical reception ==
Sankat City received generally negative reviews from film critics as a dark comedy.

== Nominations in 2010 ==
- Nominated for Most Promising Debut Director, 55th Filmfare Awards.
- Nominated for Best Director and Best Film; Searchlight Awards - Max Stardust Awards 2010.
- Nominated for Best Screenplay, Most Promising Debut Director, and Best Ensemble Cast; Nokia 16th Star Screen Award.
