= Shrivallabh Vyas =

Indian actor

Shri Vallabh Vyas
- Born: Vallabh Vyas; 1958; Jaisalmer, Rajasthan, India
- Died: 7 January 2018 (aged 59–60); Jaipur, Rajasthan, India
- Occupation: Actor
- Years active: 1993–2013
- Spouse: Shobha Vallabh Vyas

Vallabh Vyas was an Indian film and television actor. He was known for films including Sarfarosh (1999), Lagaan (2001), Abhay (2001), Aan: Men at Work (2004), Netaji Subhas Chandra Bose: The Forgotten Hero (2005), Sankat City (2009) and theater works such as Virasat (1985).

== Personal life ==
On 13 October 2008 Vyas suffered a paralytic attack while shooting for a film. Due to the financial issues, his family moved from Jaisalmer to Jaipur for his treatment. According to his wife Shobha, the Cine and TV Artists Association (CINTAA) did not support him financially, despite the fact that the association had set up a trust for the actors who were suffering from losses. Actor Arun Bali, a member of CINTAA, had provided an amount of ₹10,000 (US$100) and Gajendra Chauhan, the vice president of CINTAA had provided a cheque of ₹50,000 (US$520), which his family refused. Actors Irrfan Khan, Manoj Bajpayee and Aamir Khan provided financial help for the Vyas family and for his treatment.

== Death ==
On 7 January 2018, Vyas died at the age of 59, in Jaipur, Rajasthan.

== Selected filmography ==
Year	Film	Role
1993	Sardar	Muhammad Ali Jinnah
1994	Drohkaal	Inspector Tiwary
1995	Naajayaz	Pascal
1995	Criminal	
1999	Sarfarosh	Major Aslam Baig
1999	Shool	D.S.P
2001	Lagaan: Once Upon a Time in India	Ishwar Kaka
2001	Chandni Bar	Habib Bhai
2001	Abhay	Doctor Srinivasa Rao
2003	Satta	Mahendra Chauhan
2003	The Hero: Love Story of a Spy	Guardian
2003	Kahan Ho Tum	
2004	Agnipankh	Feroz Ali Niyazi (Pakistan Army Officer)
2004	Aan: Men at Work	HiraChand Seth
2005	Netaji Subhas Chandra Bose: The Forgotten Hero	The Fakir of Ippih in Afghanistan
2007	Shootout at Lokhandwala	Builder Wadhwani
2008	Humne Jeena Seekh Liya	School Principal
2008	Welcome to Sajjanpur	Ram Avtaar Tyagi, School Teacher
2008	1920	Doctor
2009	Sankat City	Sharafat
2009	Yeh Mera India	Vivek Joshi, Politician/Minister
2011	Shagird	

== Television ==
Year	Serial	Role	Channel	Notes
1993	Filmi Chakkar	Swamiji (Episodes 30, 31, 32)	Zee Tv	Guest Role
1995	Amaravati ki Kathayein	Vamanachari, Pujari (Episode 11: "Tulsi Tambulam")	DD National	
1995	Aahat (1995-2001)	Jai (Episode 2 Snake)/ Pushkar (Episode 31,32 Stiffness)/ Daara (Episode 114, 115 Raaz)/ Kailash (Episode 152, 153 Bhavishya) / Umakant (Episodes 186, 187 Kabzaa)/ Prof.Mandar (Episodes 258,259 Night College).	Sony TV	
1997	Ghar Jamai	Kidnapper Subhash Singh (Subbu) Episode No 37/Gajraj Singh, Millionaire Episode No 66	Zee TV	Guest role in both Episodes
1998	Captain Vyom	Astroguru	DD National	
1998	Saaya	Mr Sinha	Sony TV	
2001	CID	Ep # 191 - Kissa Toote Huye Fite Ka / The Case of the Broken Shoelace	Sony TV	
2000-2004	Son Pari	Episodes 144-146	Bindhula	Star Plus
2005	Time Bomb 9/11	Osama bin Laden	Zee TV	
