= Star Garage =

- U.S. National Register of Historic Places
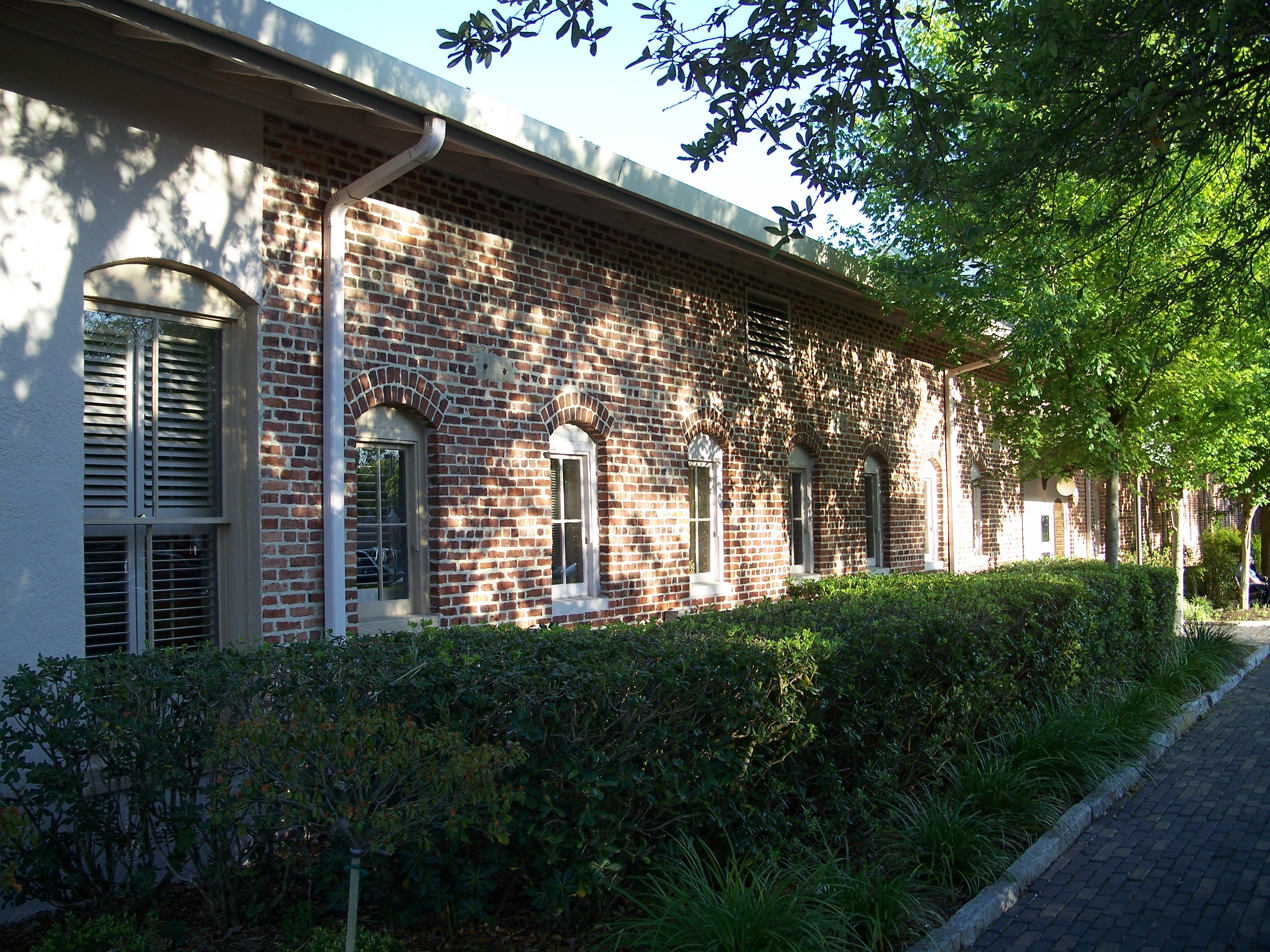

- Location within Florida Location within the United States
- Location: Gainesville, Florida
- Coordinates: 29°39′2″N 82°19′25″W
- NRHP reference No.: 85003197
- Added to NRHP: December 17, 1985

The Star Garage (also known as the Crawford and Davis Livery Stable or Poole-Gable Motors) is a U.S. historic building in Gainesville, Florida. It is located at 119 Southeast 1st Avenue. On December 17, 1985, it was added to the U.S. National Register of Historic Places.
