= Paresh Rawal =

Indian actor and film producer (born 1955)

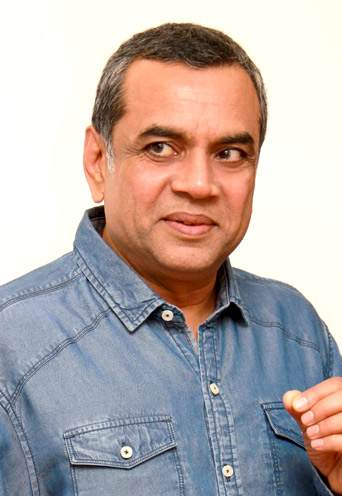
- Rawal in 2015

Chairperson of National School of Drama
- Incumbent
- Assumed office September 2020
- Preceded by: Ratan Thiyam

Member of Parliament, Lok Sabha
- In office 16 May 2014 – 23 May 2019
- Preceded by: Harin Pathak
- Succeeded by: Hasmukh Patel
- Constituency: Ahmedabad East, Gujarat

Personal details
- Born: 30 May 1955 (age 71) Bombay, Bombay State, India (present-day Mumbai, Maharashtra)
- Party: Bharatiya Janata Party
- Education: Narsee Monjee College of Commerce and Economics
- Occupation: Actor; film producer; politician; comedian
- Years active: 1982–present
- Works: Filmography
- Spouse: Swaroop Sampat (m. 1987)
- Children: 2, including Aditya Rawal
- Awards: Full list
- Honours: Padma Shri (2014)

Paresh Rawal (born 30 May 1955) is an Indian actor film producer and former politician, known for his works primarily in Hindi films. Considered as one of the finest actors of Hindi cinema, he has appeared in over 240 films and is the recipient of various accolades including a National Film Awards and three Filmfare Awards. He was honoured with Padma Shri from the Government of India in 2014.

Before establishing himself in Hindi cinema, Rawal was actively involved in Gujarati theatre. He became known for his stage performances and continued his association with theatre throughout his film career. His Gujarati play Dear Father received appreciation from audiences and was later adapted into a film of the same name in 2022.

In an interview, Rawal discussed his return to Gujarati cinema after several decades. He stated that the timing felt appropriate for him to revisit Gujarati films and expressed his interest in working on Dear Father, a project based on his Gujarati stage play of the same name.

In 1994, he won the National Film Award for Best Supporting Actor for his performances in the films Woh Chokri and Sir. For the latter, he received his first Filmfare Award for Best Performance in a Negative Role. This was followed by Ketan Mehta's Sardar, which saw him playing the lead role of freedom fighter Vallabhbhai Patel, a role that got him national and international acclaim. His other notable works in Hindi cinema are Arjun (1985), Naam (1986), Shiva (1990), Andaz Apna Apna (1993), Mohra (1994), Dilwale (1994), China Gate (1998), Aitraaz (2004) and Table No. 21 (2013). He has received recognition for his villain roles in Telugu box office hits such as Kshana Kshanam (1991), (1994), Money Money (1995), Govinda Govinda (1994), Rikshavodu (1995), Bavagaru Bagunnara (1998).

Rawal further gained acclaim for his comic and intense supporting roles since the 2000s in Hindi films. His role Baburao Ganpatrao Apte in Hera Pheri (2000) and its sequel Phir Hera Pheri (2006) became cult classic. Other notable films include Nayak (2001), Aankhen, Awara Paagal Deewana (both 2002), Hungama (2003), Garam Masala (2005), Chup Chup Ke, Malamaal Weekly (both 2006), Welcome (2007), Mere Baap Pehle Aap, Oye Lucky! Lucky Oye! (2008) Ready (2011), OMG (2012), Tiger Zinda Hai (2017), Sanju (2018), Uri (2019) and The Storyteller (2025) in which he portrayed Satyajit Ray's famous character Tarini Khuro. He appeared in the Tamil film Soorarai Pottru (2020) and later reprised the same role in the Hindi version of the film Sarfira (2024) starring Akshay Kumar and Radhika Madan.

== Early and personal life ==
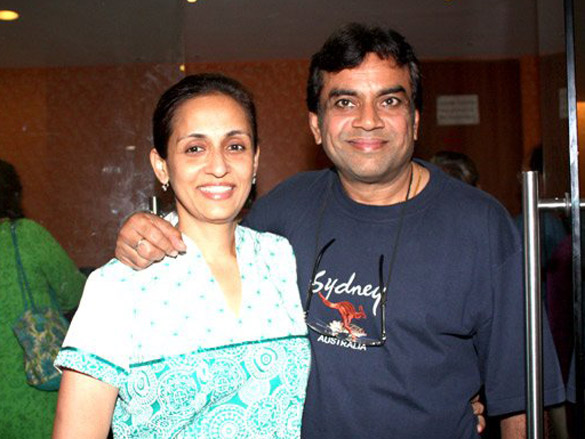
Rawal with his wife Swaroop Sampat at the screening of the film Oye Lucky! Lucky Oye!

Rawal was born and raised in Bombay (present-day Mumbai) to a Gujarati family.

Rawal completed his education in Mumbai and graduated from Narsee Monjee College of Commerce and Economics. During his college years, he was associated with theatre, which preceded his entry into films.

In 1987, Rawal married Swaroop Sampat, an actress and winner of the Miss India contest in 1979. Paresh and Swaroop have two sons, Aditya and Anirudh. He is an alumnus of Narsee Monjee College of Commerce & Economics, Vile Parle, Mumbai.

His son Aditya Rawal is an actor and writer. He made his acting debut with the Hindi film Bamfaad (2020).

== Career ==
Rawal made his debut with the 1985 film Arjun in a supporting role. He was also part of the cast of the Doordarshan TV serial, Bante Bigadte. It was the 1986 blockbuster, Naam, that established him as an actor with great talent. He then appeared in over 100 films throughout the 1980s and 1990s, mostly as the antagonist, such as in Roop ki Rani Choron Ka Raja, Kabzaa, King Uncle, Ram Lakhan, Sir for which he won Filmfare Award for Best Villain, Dilwale, Daud, Baazi and so many more. In the 1990s, he also starred in the cult comedy Andaz Apna Apna in which he played a double role. Rawal was perceived as a character actor by both audiences and critics until the 2000 Bollywood cult classic Hera Pheri, after which he starred in many Hindi mainstream films as a lead actor or main protagonist. Rawal played the dim-witted, boisterous and kind-hearted Marathi landlord Baburao Ganpatrao Apte in the film Hera Pheri, who takes in Raju (Akshay Kumar) and Shyam (Sunil Shetty) as paying guests in his house. Rawal's performance was a key reason for the major nationwide success the film received. For his performance, he won the Filmfare Best Comedian Award. He reprised his role as Baburao in the sequel to the film Phir Hera Pheri (2006), which was also successful.

Another notable lead role came in 2002 when Rawal portrayed one of three blind bank robbers in the hit film Aankhen, co-starring Amitabh Bachchan, Aditya Pancholi, Akshay Kumar, Arjun Rampal and Sushmita Sen. Rawal, for the remainder of the 2000s, was seen in mainly comedy oriented multi-starrers, mostly among the lead protagonists such as in Awara Paagal Deewana (2002), Hungama (2003), Hulchul (2004), Garam Masala (2005), Deewane Huye Paagal (2005), Malamaal Weekly (2006), Golmaal: Fun Unlimited (2006), Chup Chup Ke (2006), Bhagam Bhag (2006), Shankar Dada MBBS (Telugu), Bhool Bhulaiyaa, Welcome, Mere Baap Pehle Aap (2008) and De Dana Dan (2009). In 2010, Rawal acted in the movie Aakrosh, based on honour killing.

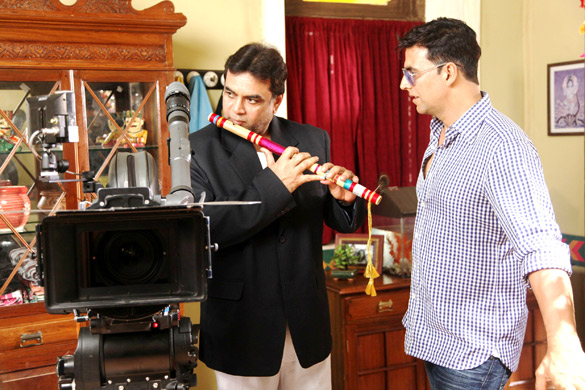
Rawal with Akshay Kumar on the sets of the film OMG: Oh My God!

In 2012, Rawal played the lead role in the movie OMG – Oh My God!. Akshay Kumar was seen supporting him, and both won rave reviews for their roles. He has also had a very successful acting career in Gujarati plays, the latest one being Dear Father. For television, he has produced several Hindi soaps including Zee TV's Teen Bahuraaniyaan, Sahara One's Main Aisi Kyunn Hoon and Colors' Laagi Tujhse Lagan.

His most notable release of 2018 was Rajkumar Hirani's Sanju with Ranbir Kapoor. He played actor Sunil Dutt's role in the movie. He was also reported to reprise his role as Baburao Ganpatrao Apte in Hera Pheri 3 which was going to be released in 2024, but was put 'on hold' in May 2024.

On 10 September 2020 he was appointed the chief of the National School of Drama, by the President of India.

In 2021, Rawal appeared in sports drama Toofaan, a film directed by Rakeysh Omprakash Mehra, alongside Farhan Akhtar, who essayed the role of a national level boxer. The film was streamed worldwide on 16 July 2021 on Amazon Prime Video.

In 2025, he appeared in the horror films Nikita Roy and Thamma. In the same year, he also appeared in the films Ajey: The Untold Story of a Yogi and The Taj Story, both of which generated much controversy due to the subject matter of the films.

His upcoming films are Tera Yaar Hoon Main, Bhagam Bhag 2 and Hera Pheri 3.

== Politics ==
He won as the Bharatiya Janata Party's Member of Parliament (MP) from Ahmedabad East constituency in the 2014 Indian general election. In 2014, he was awarded Padma Shri.

2014 Indian general elections: Ahmedabad East
Party	Candidate	Votes	%	±%
BJP	Paresh Rawal	633,582	64.29	+10.92
INC	Himmatsingh Patel	306,949	31.15	−7.82
AAP	Dinesh Vaghela	11,349	1.15	N/A
BSP	Rohit Rajubhai Virjubhai	6,023	0.61	−0.60
NOTA	None of the Above	14,358	1.46	N/A
Majority		326,633	33.14	+18.74
Turnout		985,525	61.52	+19.20
BJP hold		Swing	+10.92	
