= Hera Pheri (film series) =

Indian film series

Hera Pheri Film Series
- Created by: Priyadarshan (1, 3); Neeraj Vora (2)
- Original work: The Circus (1928); Ramji Rao Speaking (1989); Lock, Stock and Two Smoking Barrels (1998)
- Owners: A. G. Nadiadwala (1); Firoz Nadiadwala (2, 3)

Films and television
- Film(s): Hera Pheri (2000); Phir Hera Pheri (2006); Hera Pheri 3 (TBA)

Audio
- Soundtrack(s): Hera Pheri (2000); Phir Hera Pheri (2006)

Miscellaneous
- Portrayers: Akshay Kumar; Paresh Rawal; Suniel Shetty

Hera Pheri (transl. foul play) is a series of Indian comedy films. The first film was directed by Priyadarshan and produced by A. G. Nadiadwala, the second film was directed by Neeraj Vora while the third film will be directed by Priyadarshan and produced by Firoz A. Nadiadwala. The first film of the series was the remake of the Malayalam film Ramji Rao Speaking while the second film's central plot takes inspiration from Lock, Stock and Two Smoking Barrels and the circus sequences were taken from the Charlie Chaplin film The Circus. The series stars Akshay Kumar, Sunil Shetty and Paresh Rawal in lead roles. The third installment of the series is in development.

The Hera-Pheri series is now the twenty-ninth highest-grossing film series in Bollywood and has developed a cult following in the years since its release.

== Films ==
=== Hera Pheri (2000) ===
The plot revolves around an eccentric trio, consisting of a comically hilarious but kind hearted garage owner named Baburao Ganpatrao Apte (Rawal), a crafty and cunning loafer named Raju (Kumar), and a simple and struggling pauper named Shyam (Shetty) who find themselves trapped in crazy shenanigans including hilarious bits from Rawal himself.

The film begins with Shyam searching for a job at a bank which he finds is given to some girl named Anuradha Shivshankar Panikar (Tabu) even though Shyam's father died in the bank due to a fire. The manager (Asrani) tells Shyam that despite knowing the truth, he is unable to do anything further. Shyam walks off in a huff and accidentally bumps into Raju. Shyam mistakes Raju for a pickpocket and begins to chase him. Raju eventually gets away clean. Raju has his own troubles, dealing with his daydreams and unfriendly and disappointed people he is working for. He doesn't seem to keep a job alive and thus faces many problems.

Shyam then approaches a garage owner by the name of Baburao Ganpatrao Apte, and manages to get a room on rent by compromising on the amount for Baburao's alcohol. Unknowingly for him Raju is staying in the same house on rent, which he hasn't paid for the last two years. The trio falls into hilarious situations that usually involve Raju instigating Shyam and purposefully trying to create a tandem that Baburao, fondly called as Babu Bhaiyya has to resolve. During one such fight, Anuradha intervenes and tries Shyam to sign the Non-Objection Certificate, so that she could have the job at the bank. When Shyam refuses, Raju makes a plot to make him sign the papers. Shyam eventually finds out that Raju made him sign the papers and that is when the rivalry between the two commences. An old friend of Shyam's, Khadak Singh (Om Puri) comes to Shyam's place asking to return his money so that he can marry off his sister and afford the dowry.

Shyam finds out that Raju has been deceiving his mother by posing as an engineer and creates an uncomfortable situation for Raju as he calls his mother fake while being inebriated. Raju retaliates, saying he just wants to see his dying mother happy and nothing else. Anuradha prepares a job resignation meanwhile and gives it to Shyam, who in return tears it up because of her mentally ailing mother and the debts to be paid to the debtors.

Their life takes an unexpected turn when they get a call from Kabeera (Gulshan Grover) which is a wrong number actually meant for the owner of Star fisheries, Mr. Devi Prasad (Kulbhushan Kharbanda). The wrong number is because of the misprint in the phone directory, which renders Star fisheries' number as Star garage's and vice versa. Kabeera, a terrorist cum kidnapper, tells who he thinks is Devi Prasad that his granddaughter is kidnapped and asks for ransom. Raju overhears the entire conversation going between Kabeera and Shyam and decides to play a game.

The game involves Shyam calling Devi Prasad posing as the kidnappers and asking for double the ransom amount. This will make their monetary problems disappear. Shyam and Baburao initially repel the idea and try to go the faithful way. But Raju in turn convinces them that even though wrong, this is a golden chance to earn money. Both relent and phone the real Devi Prasad and ask for double ransom. Their first attempt gets foiled, by the police and Kabeera informs them that the ransom has been doubled. They phone Devi Prasad again. This time they ask for a foolproof double ransom.

They reveal their true identities to Devi Prasad to win his confidence and try to save the girl from the kidnappers. But the girl recognizes Shyam as an imposter and Kabeera gets alerted. A huge fight involving the police, Kabeera's gang members and Khadak Singh's men, infuriated by the delay in the money return intervene the fight, takes place. The scenes are hilariously choreographed, especially those involving Baburao losing his spectacles and accidentally firing an AK-47 all over the floor. The girl is saved by the three and returned to Devi Prasad. Baburao and Shyam go home happily intending to find Raju with the money, but they find him missing. They call the police and Raju is found to be gone to return the money of the debtors.

In the end, Devi Prasad comes to the trio's rescue and convinces the police that it was all a misunderstanding and saves the three and they go home, and they keep the money.

=== Phir Hera Pheri (2006) ===
Hera Pheri ended with the trio of Raju (Akshay Kumar), Shyam (Sunil Shetty), and Babu Bhaiya (Paresh Rawal) rich and rolling in money. Phir Hera Pheri tells the story of what happens after they become rich.

The film opens with a prologue bringing the audience up to date, stating that each has suffered a personal loss despite their new riches. Shyam lost his love, Anuradha (Tabu), in an automobile accident, Raju's mother died after battling a disease, and Baburao – having nothing to lose in the first place – lost the little traces of common sense that he did possess.

The three men are living a king's life in a massive bungalow and splurging on various luxuries. Raju hears about an idea for doubling his wealth from a con woman, Anuradha (Bipasha Basu), who is claiming to be a bank manager, and she convinces Shyam and Baburao to go along with it. Raju first arranges for ₹30 lakh from Shyam and Baburao and then a further ₹50 lakh by selling their bungalow. He convinces a small-time goon, Pappu (Rajpal Yadav) to contribute the remaining balance of ₹20 lakh so that he can come up with the minimum deposit of ₹1 crore, which Anuradha has promised to double.

The trio invest the money and 21 days later realise that it was all a scam and that they are now penniless. To make matters worse, they do not even have possession of their bungalow, which Raju had sold off in order to arrange the last bit of money needed, and have to live in a chawl (tenement). Pappu shows up to the bungalow the next day to pick up his portion of the money, but is shocked to learn that Raju has left and the bungalow is now in possession of a gun collector (Dinesh Hingoo). Pappu is now in trouble because he had borrowed money from a lisping but dreaded gangster, Tiwari (Sharat Saxena), who will kill him if he doesn't pay up. He comes across Raju one day, and upon hearing of the scam pretends to be sympathetic. He tricks him and brings the three to his boss, telling him that they are the ones who took the money. Tiwari threatens them and tells them they have to come up with the money or else they will die. As they are being taken home by some of Tiwari's goons, the three manage to escape. Raju, Shyam and Baburao are about to leave the city when Raju remembers that he owes money to a woman named Anjali (Rimi Sen). The three head over to her house and are surprised to find that she is Pappu's sister. Tiwari's goons show up and kidnap Anjali because Pappu has not returned the money. Feeling guilty that he is the one who got Anjali in trouble, Raju decides that he will go to Tiwari and try to get her freed. Shyam and Baburao refuse to leave without them and decide to stay as well. The three go back to Tiwari to ask him to release Anjali, and Tiwari tells them to bring the money in order to release Anjali.

Raju, Shyam and Baburao now have three days to come up with ₹40 lakh to pay back the goon or else they will themselves be killed. Raju overhears the neighbor, Munna Bhai (Johnny Lever), plotting to steal drugs from another gangster, Nanji Bhai (Milind Gunaji), and wrongly assumes they are talking about stealing money. Raju hatches a plan for the three of them to steal from Munna Bhai. The three manage to barely succeed, but are confused when they do not find money inside. Raju recognizes the stuff as drugs and tells them that they are worth at least ₹3 crore (thirty million). They think that if they can sell them to Kachara Seth (Manoj Joshi) and pay off Tiwari, they can also become rich, but their neighbor once again steals the drugs from them. They then run into Anuradha and she tells them that the entire scam was hatched by Kabeera (the gangster from the first Hera Pheri) to get revenge on the trio, and that the only reason she went along with it was because they were holding her niece hostage (Anuradha's sister was Kabeera's gang member and part of the first movie's kidnapping plot). Their money was converted to diamonds to pay the ransom, but she fled with them once she discovered her niece had escaped and hid them under a decoration of a circus float.

In the end, all the guys end up in a circus show where they attempt to get ahold of the diamonds. These are strewn all over the ground in public by a gorilla. Raju escapes with Pappu's cellphone and three antique guns with him, which are worth ₹5–6 crore, though he does not know about it. Pappu informs Shyam and Baburao about the guns, after which they try to call Raju on his cellphone. The film ends on a cliffhanger, with Raju about to throw the guns in the river with his cellphone ringing in his mouth.

=== Hera Pheri 3 (TBA) ===
A third film was announced and planned. However, due to some issues, production was delayed indefinitely. Eventually, the project was shelved.

In 2017, Neeraj Vora was hired to direct the film, and shooting was about to begin. When the film came into production, Rawal and Kumar elected not to reprise their roles as Baburao and Raju, respectively and were replaced by John Abraham, Nana Patekar and Abhishek Bachchan. However, Vora suffered a massive stroke, resulting in a coma. He died soon after, throwing the film's future in doubt.

In May 2018, it was confirmed that Indra Kumar will direct Hera Pheri 3 and Akshay Kumar, Sunil Shetty, and Paresh Rawal will reprise their roles from the previous films as Raju, Shyam, and Baburao, respectively.

On 28 February 2019, Kumar gave an update on Hera Pheri 3. He revealed that the film will have heavy visual effects and, in his own words, "I am happy that everybody's favourite trio is coming back together again. We will start the film towards the end of this year. It is currently being scripted. I was completely cut off from that project for the last three months because I was busy with Total Dhamaal."

The film was planned to be shot and edited in 2020 and released in 2021, but was delayed due to the COVID-19 pandemic. The film plans to be a continuation of the previous two films.

In November 2022, it was reported that Kumar would not appear in the third film, citing creative differences. Paresh Rawal tweeted that Kartik Aaryan will replace Kumar and that the film will go on floors in 2023 with Anees Bazmee, instead of Indra Kumar.

On 21 February 2023, after several rumours about Hera Pheri 3 starring Kartik Aaryan, the news broke out that the shoot of the film had quietly begun with the original cast in Mumbai's Empire Studio, under the direction of Farhad Samji. On 6 March 2023, it was confirmed that Sanjay Dutt has joined the cast.

On 30 January 2025, it was confirmed that Priyadarshan will direct the third film.

In May 2025, Paresh Rawal stated on social media that he will not be part of the third film, but has since reportedly returned to the film as of July 2025.

== Cast and characters ==
Character	Film		
Character	Hera Pheri	Phir Hera Pheri	Hera Pheri 3
Raju	Akshay Kumar	Akshay Kumar	Akshay Kumar
Ghanshyam "Shyam"	Suniel Shetty	Suniel Shetty	Suniel Shetty
Baburao Ganpatrao Apte	Paresh Rawal	Paresh Rawal	Paresh Rawal
Anuradha Shivshankar Panikar	Tabu		
Devi Prasad	Kulbhushan Kharbanda		
Khadak Singh	Om Puri		
Bank Manager	Asrani		
Police Commissioner Prakash	Mukesh Khanna		
Chhota Chetan	Razak Khan	Razak Khan	
Kabira	Gulshan Grover		
Chaman Jhinga/ Parsi Man	Dinesh Hingoo	Dinesh Hingoo	
Anuradha		Bipasha Basu	
Anjali		Rimi Sen	
Munna Bhai		Johnny Lever	
Pappu		Rajpal Yadav	
Tiwari		Sharat Saxena	
Chhote		Ravi Kishan	
Nanji Bhai		Milind Gunaji	
Peter		Suresh Menon	

== Crew ==
Occupation	Film		
Occupation	Hera Pheri (2000)	Phir Hera Pheri (2006)	Hera Pheri 3 (TBA)
Director	Priyadarshan	Neeraj Vora	Priyadarshan
Producer(s)	A. G. Nadiadwala	Firoz A. Nadiadwala	Firoz A. Nadiadwala
Writer(s)	Neeraj Vora	Neeraj Vora	TBA
Story by	Neeraj Vora	Neeraj Vora	TBA
Screenplay by	Anand Vardhan	Neeraj Vora	TBA
Music director(s)	Anu Malik	Himesh Reshammiya	TBA
Cinematographer	Jeeva	Velraj	TBA
Editor(s)	N. Gopalakrishnan	Diwakar P. Bhonsle; Virendra Gharse	TBA

== Release and revenue ==
Film	Release date	Budget	Box office revenue
Hera Pheri	31 March 2000	₹7.5 crore	₹21.4 crore
Phir Hera Pheri	9 June 2006	₹18 crore	₹69.12 crore
Total		₹25.5 crore	₹90.52 crore
