= Rimi Sen =

Indian former actress (born 1981)

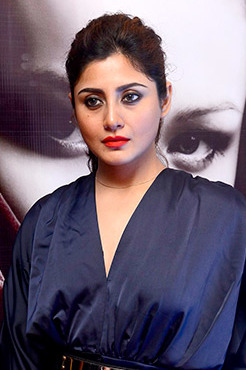
- Sen in 2017
- Born: Subhamitra Sen; 21 September 1981 (age 45); Calcutta, West Bengal, India
- Occupation: Film actress
- Years active: 1996–2011; 2015–2016

Rimi Sen (Bengali pronunciation: [rimi ʃen]; born Subhamitra Sen; 21 September 1981), also known professionally as Rimii, is a former Indian actress and producer, who primarily appeared in Hindi, Telugu, and Bengali films. Sen is a recipient of a National Film Award.

Sen made her debut as a lead actress in 2002, in the Telugu film Nee Thodu Kavali. In 2003, she made her Hindi film debut in the comedy film Hungama for which she was nominated at the Filmfare Awards for Best Female Debut. Subsequently, she appeared in several successful films including Baghban (2003), Dhoom (2004), Garam Masala (2005), Kyon Ki (2005), Deewane Huye Paagal (2005), Phir Hera Pheri (2006) and Golmaal: Fun Unlimited (2006). She also participated in the reality television show Bigg Boss in 2015. After quitting the entertainment industry, she works as a real estate agent in Dubai.

== Early life ==
Sen was born as Subhamitra Sen into a Bengali Baidya family from Calcutta, West Bengal. She graduated with a degree in commerce from the University of Calcutta.

== Career ==
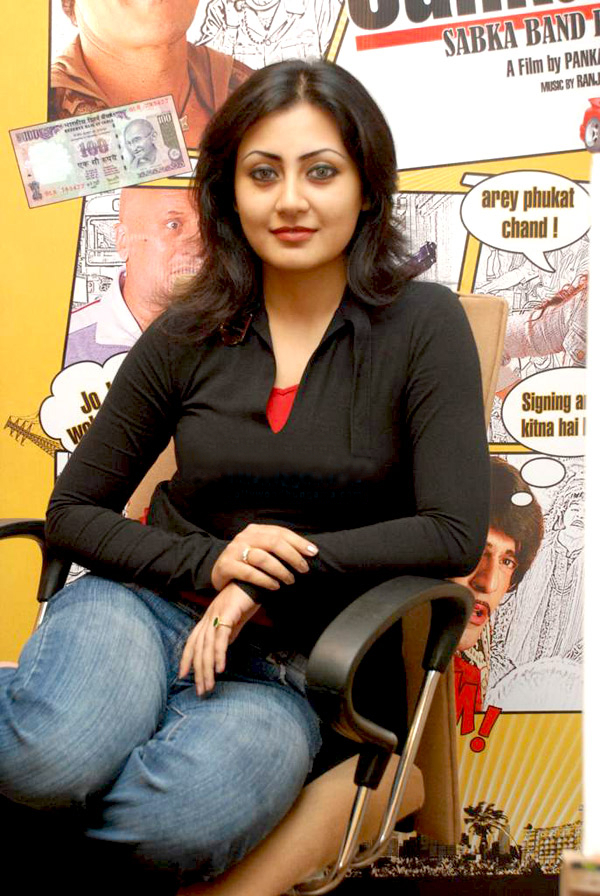
Sen at an event in 2011

Since childhood, Sen dreamt of becoming an actress. She lived at Jyotish Roy Road, New Alipore, Kolkata with her mother. She did her schooling from Vidya Bharati New Alipore near Mint. After completing her studies, she persuaded her mother to accompany her to Mumbai. She later said that she wasn't encouraged by anyone in her family except by her grandfather. After doing the rounds, she got into ads including one Coca-Cola ad with Aamir Khan.

Sen made her debut as a lead actress in the Telugu movie Nee Thodu Kavali. Her debut Hindi film, Vijay Galani's Hungama was released in 2003. It was a comedy film, in which she co-starred with Akshaye Khanna, Aftab Shivdasani and Paresh Rawal.

She followed it with appearances in big-budget movies such as Dhoom (2004), Kyon Ki (2005), Garam Masala (2005) and Golmaal (2006). Sen also did a cameo in the 2006 film Dhoom 2, and she followed it with Johnny Gaddaar, alongside newcomer actor Neil Nitin Mukesh. In 2008, she appeared in De Taali and in 2009, Sankat City and Horn Ok Please. All three of these films were box office disasters. After these films, her career declined.

She further appeared in the films Thank You and Shagird in 2011. Both failed to do well. In 2015, she participated in the reality show Bigg Boss. Sen has produced a film, Budhia Singh - Born to Run. She changed her screen name, Rimi, to her real name, Subhamitra Sen for her production venture.

Sen was a celebrity contestant in the ninth season of the Indian version of the reality TV show Big Brother, Bigg Boss. It aired in October 2015. Sen entered the house with Suyyash Rai as her partner for the show; however, her pairing was revised on Day 5, when Rochelle Rao was chosen as her new partner. She was evicted after staying in the house for 7.5 weeks. In 2016, Sen participated in the dance celebrity reality show, Jhalak Dikhhla Jaa 9 as a wild card entrant but did not get selected.

== Filmography ==
=== Films ===
Year	Film	Role	Language	Notes
2000	Paromitar Ek Din	Niece of Paromita's first husband	Bengali	Bengali debut
2001	Ide Naa Modati Prema Lekha	Anjali	Telugu	Telugu debut, credited as Rimi
2002	Nee Thodu Kavali	Sindhu	Telugu	
2003	Hungama	Anjali	Hindi	
2003	Baghban	Payal Malhotra	Hindi	
2004	Sajani	Priya	Bengali	
2004	Dhoom	Sweety Dixit	Hindi	credited as Rimii
2004	Swapner Din	Ameena	Bengali	
2005	Andarivaadu	Swetha	Telugu	
2005	Garam Masala	Anjali	Hindi	credited as Rimii
2005	Kyon Ki	Maya Sahani	Hindi	credited as Rimii
2005	Deewane Huye Paagal	Tanya / Natasha Mulchandani	Hindi	
2006	Phir Hera Pheri	Anjali Patekar	Hindi	credited as Rimi
2006	Golmaal: Fun Unlimited	Niraali	Hindi	
2006	Dhoom 2	Sweety Dixit	Hindi	Special appearance
2007	Hattrick	Kashmira	Hindi	credited as Rimi
2007	Johnny Gaddaar	Mini	Hindi	credited as Rimi
2008	De Taali	Kartika Rai / Anjali Nahata	Hindi	
2009	Sankat City	Mona	Hindi	credited as Rimi
2009	Horn 'Ok' Pleassss	Ria / Sia (dual role)	Hindi	
2011	Thank You	Shivani Chopra	Hindi	credited as Rimi
2011	Shagird	Varsha Mathur	Hindi	credited as Rimi
2016	Budhia Singh – Born to Run	—	Hindi	Producer

=== Television ===
Year	Title	Role	Notes	Ref.
2015	Bigg Boss 9	Contestant	13th place	
2016	Jhalak Dikhhla Jaa 9	Contestant	Not selected	

== Awards and nominations ==
List of awards and nominations received by Sen
Year	Film	Award	Category	Result	Ref.
2004	Hungama	Filmfare Awards	Best Female Debut	Nominated	
2004	Hungama	Screen Awards	Most Promising Newcomer – Female	Nominated	
2004	Hungama	Stardust Awards	Superstar of Tomorrow – Female	Nominated	
2004	Hungama	International Indian Film Academy Awards	Star Debut of the Year – Female	Nominated	
2004	Hungama	Anandalok Puraskar Awards	Best Debut Actress	Won	
2004	Hungama	Zee Cine Awards	Best Female Debut	Nominated	
2004	Baghban	Zee Cine Awards	Best Female Debut	Nominated	
2005	Dhoom	Stardust Awards	Best Breakthrough Performance – Female	Nominated	
2010	Sankat City	Screen Awards	Best Ensemble Cast	Nominated	
2016	Budhia Singh - Born to Run	National Film Awards	Best Children's Film	Won	
2016	Budhia Singh - Born to Run	WorldFest-Houston International Film Festival	Best Film	Won	
