= Sir (1993 film) =

1993 Indian film directed by Mahesh Bhatt

- Theatrical release poster
- Directed by: Mahesh Bhatt
- Written by: Jay Dixit
- Produced by: Mukesh Bhatt
- Starring: Naseeruddin Shah; Atul Agnihotri; Pooja Bhatt; Paresh Rawal; Gulshan Grover
- Cinematography: Pravin Bhatt
- Music by: Anu Malik
- Production company: Vishesh Films
- Distributed by: Vishesh Films
- Release date: 9 July 1993
- Running time: 151 minutes
- Country: India
- Language: Hindi

Sir is a 1993 Indian Hindi-language crime drama film directed by Mahesh Bhatt starring debutant Atul Agnihotri and Pooja Bhatt in the lead roles, with Naseeruddin Shah playing the title role. Paresh Rawal and Gulshan Grover play the antagonist. The core plot is based on the 1967 British film To Sir, with Love, about a teacher attempting to help and reform troubled students and Bhatt turning it into an action-drama with the additional element of the Mumbai underworld. The film was remade in Telugu as Gangmaster, with Rajasekhar.

== Plot ==
Mumbai-based college lecturer Amar Verma lives with his wife, Shobha, and 6-year-old son, Kunal. When a war breaks out between gang lords Veljibhai and Chhapan Tikli alias Jimmy, a number of innocent bystanders fall victim, one of whom is Kunal. This devastates the Verma family and Shobha walks out on Amar, who then devotes his life to his students. Many years later, when he finds out that a student, Pooja, is afflicted by stammering, he decides to help her. He finds out that she is the only child of gangster Veljibhai.

Amar meets with Veljibhai, discusses the gang-war scenario, then meets with Chhapan Tikli and does the same. Amar gets the gangsters to agree on a truce so that he can take Pooja and the rest of the students on a field trip to Bangalore. Amar will soon find out that neither Veljibhai nor Chhapan Tikli has any intention of keeping any truce. As the two dons engage in a fight to the finish, it seems that Amar may well have jeopardized his own life as well as the lives of Pooja and the other students. An additional complication arises with Pooja falling in love with her classmate Karan and wishing to marry him against the wishes of her father.

== Cast ==
- Naseeruddin Shah as Professor Amar Verma
- Atul Agnihotri as Karan Luchad
- Pooja Bhatt as Pooja Patekar, Veljibhai's daughter.
- Paresh Rawal as Veljibhai Patekar
- Gulshan Grover as Chhappan Tikli / a.k.a. Jimmy
- Avtar Gill as Arjun Daas
- Soni Razdan as Shobha Verma, Amar's wife.
- Sushmita Mukherjee as Sweety Tikli, Jimmy's sister.
- Abha Ranjan as Mrs. Patekar, Velji's wife.
- Mushtaq Khan as Kaluba
- Mahesh Anand as Rajan, Jimmy's henchman.
- Makrand Deshpande as Mack
- Anang Desai as Doctor
- Master Kunal Kemmu as Kunal Verma, Amar and Shobha's son.
- Brownie Parasher as the Last man killed by Kaluba.
- Suhas Bhalekar
- Anant Jog
- Viplove Rai
- Vikas Anand
- G. P. Singh
- Gopal Poojari
- Kamal Malik
- Deepak Sinha
- Anjana
- Banjara

== Awards and nominations ==
| Award | Category | Recipients and nominees | Results |
|---|---|---|---|
| 39th Filmfare Awards | Best Supporting Actor | Naseeruddin Shah | Nominated |
| 39th Filmfare Awards | Best Villain | Gulshan Grover | Nominated |
| 39th Filmfare Awards | Best Villain | Paresh Rawal | Won |
| 39th Filmfare Awards | Best Dialogue | Professor Jay Dixit | Won |
| 41st National Film Awards | Best Supporting Actor | Paresh Rawal | Won |

== Music ==
Sir

Soundtrack album by Anu Malik
- Released: July 1992
- Recorded: 1992
- Genre: Film soundtrack
- Length: 56:13
- Label: Lara Music

Anu Malik chronology
| Izzat (1991) | Sir (1992) | Chamatkar (1992) |

This album was very popular when released, most popular songs in album "Sun Sun Barsat Ki Dhun", "Aaj Hamne Dil Ka", "Yeh Ujli Chandani Jab" most of the songs sung by Kumar Sanu also sang Alka Yagnik & Kavita Krishnamurthy etc.

"Sun Sun Barsat Ki Dhun" was recreated in 2021 by Rochak Kohli in the voice of Jubin Nautiyal. The video of the song became very popular on YouTube. Nautiyal's voice was well praised by the audience.

All lyrics are written by Qatil Shafai; all music is composed by Anu Malik.

| No. | Title | Singer (s) | Length |
|---|---|---|---|
| 1. | "Sun Sun Barsat Ki Dhun" | Kumar Sanu | 7:20 |
| 2. | "Aaj Hamne Dil Ka" | Kumar Sanu Kavita Krishnamurthy | 7:09 |
| 3. | "Yeh Ujli Chandani Jab" | Kumar Sanu Alka Yagnik | 7:16 |
| 4. | "Band Hothon Se" (Female) | Kavita Krishnamurthy | 6:27 |
| 5. | "Hamse Badal Gaya" | Kumar Sanu | 6:42 |
| 6. | "Jis Din Suraj Ki" | Kumar Sanu | 8:38 |
| 7. | "Band Hothon Se" (Male) | Kumar Sanu | 6:14 |
| 8. | "Odh Ke Andhera" | Alka Yagnik | 6:50 |
| Total length: | | | 56:13 |
