= Hera Pheri (2000 film) =

2000 Indian film by Priyadarshan

- Theatrical release poster
- Directed by: Priyadarshan
- Written by: Neeraj Vora
- Story by: Anand
- Based on: Ramji Rao Speaking by Siddique-Lal
- Produced by: A. G. Nadiadwala
- Starring: Akshay Kumar; Suniel Shetty; Paresh Rawal; Tabu; Om Puri; Asrani
- Cinematography: Jeeva
- Edited by: N. Gopalakrishnan
- Music by: Songs: Anu Malik; Guest Composers: Lalit Sen; Bally Sagoo; Background Score: Surinder Sodhi
- Production company: A. G. Films
- Release date: 31 March 2000
- Running time: 138 minutes
- Country: India
- Language: Hindi
- Budget: ₹7.5 crore
- Box office: ₹21.4 crore

Hera Pheri (transl. Foul Play) is a 2000 Indian Hindi-language comedy drama film directed by Priyadarshan and originally written by Siddique-Lal and adapted screenplay by Neeraj Vora, starring Akshay Kumar, Suniel Shetty, Paresh Rawal, Tabu, Om Puri, Asrani, and Gulshan Grover. The film is a remake of 1989 Malayalam film Ramji Rao Speaking which itself was inspired by the 1971 American TV film See The Man Run. It is the first instalment of the Hera Pheri franchise. The plot revolves around two tenants, Raju and Shyam, and their landlord, Baburao Ganpatrao Apte, who are in desperate need of money. They chance upon a ransom call through a cross-connection and hatch a plan to claim the ransom for themselves.

The film was released on 31 March 2000. It opened to mixed reviews, some of whom applauded the performances of Kumar and Rawal particularly. The film is considered Kumar's foray into the comedy genre. However, the film achieved commercial success, grossing ₹57.4 crore at the box office against a budget of ₹7.5 crore. It spawned a sequel, Phir Hera Pheri, released in 2006.

Over the years, the film has evolved into a cult classic, and is widely regarded as one of the greatest Indian comedy films ever made. The film is noted for its authenticity and depiction of the economic problems of lower middle class families in India, situational comedy, dialogues, performances of the lead trio Kumar, Rawal and Shetty. It was voted the best Bollywood comedy film of all time in an online poll conducted by The Indian Express in 2014. It was remade in Telugu as Dhanalakshmi, I Love You in 2002 by Siva Nageswara Rao.

== Plot ==
Ghanshyam, a.k.a. Shyam, arrives in Mumbai from Gurgaon seeking a job at the private bank where his late father, Sundarlal, worked earlier. Apparently, Sundarlal died in a fire accident at the bank, so Shyam should receive his job according to the company's rules. However, the bank manager informs Shyam that another person, Shivshankar Panikar, died two minutes after Sundarlal in the accident. Shivshankar's daughter, Anuradha, has also applied for the job, and since Shivshankar was senior to Sundarlal, it is given to Anuradha first, disappointing Shyam. Later, Shyam bumps into another man, Raju, whom he misunderstands for a pickpocket and pursues him. Raju, in turn, misunderstands Shyam for a pickpocket and pursues him too. Raju has troubles dealing with his daydreams and all his jobs are thus short-lived. He does not believe in hard work and aims to earn easy money. Raju deceives everyone, even his widowed mother, Savitri Devi, who resides at an old age home in Mumbai, believing her son is a successful Kolkata engineer. Meanwhile, Shyam approaches the "Star Garage" owned by Baburao Ganpatrao Apte, who owes a familial debt to several moneylenders and has difficulty paying them. Baburao agrees to take Shyam in as his tenant. Baburao also houses another tenant who, unfortunately for Shyam, is Raju, who has not paid rent in two years. The trio falls into situations, usually involving Raju and Shyam verbally harassing each other and creating chaos, which Baburao miserably resolves.

One day, the trio is visited by Anuradha, who asks Shyam to sign a NOC so she can receive the bank position. After Shyam refuses, Raju helps Anuradha by tricking Shyam into signing the documents, causing their rivalry to peak. Enraged, Shyam threatens to sue the bank manager and Anuradha, who agrees to give him the position in exchange for ₹50,000, but Shyam refuses. Khadak Singh, an old friend of Shyam in Gurgaon, visits and demands ₹35,000 that Shyam had borrowed prior. Otherwise, the marriage of Khadak Singh's younger sister, Banno, will be cancelled, and he will commit suicide. Shyam gives up the bank job and borrows ₹35,000 from Anuradha to repay his debt to Khadak Singh. However, he learns that Anuradha is living with her mentally ill mother in poverty and has to pay the rent. She admits she discovered Shyam's own difficult financial situation, compelling her to not go through with her plan. She decides to resign from her job. In return, Shyam tears Anuradha's resignation letter up, insisting that he could never live with himself, and asks her to keep the position. Later, Shyam discovers Raju's deception to his mother and drunkenly confronts him, accusing him of faking his mother's existence. Raju breaks down in tears and admits that his mother is real, and that he will go to any extent to avoid breaking her heart, which pleases both Shyam and Baburao to hear. The trio unites with each other after sharing grievances and decides to overcome their financial problems together.

Opportunity arrives when Baburao receives a phone call from Kabira, a gangster. The call is meant for Devi Prasad, the wealthy owner of "Star Fisheries", but gets mixed up due to a phone directory misprint. Kabira, believing Prasad to be on the phone, informs Baburao that Prasad's granddaughter, Rinku, has been kidnapped by his gang and demands a ransom of ₹10 lakhs. Raju takes advantage of this to solve their monetary problems. The trio call the real Devi Prasad, posing as the kidnappers, and double the ransom amount in order to obtain the other half themselves while satisfying the initial ransom demand. Shyam and Baburao, while initially hesitatant, agree when Raju convinces them that though the plan is wrong, it is a golden chance to earn easy money as well as save the life of an innocent girl. As planned, Shyam calls Prasad, posing as Kabira, and demands double the ransom. He also instructs Devi Prasad to meet them at the same location Kabira has chosen for the exchange. Devi Prasad keeps the kidnapping a secret, but his servant discovers the truth. Without Prasad's knowledge, he involves the police led by Inspector Prakash to track down the kidnappers.

The police arrive at the scene to target the trio. However, Devi Prasad prevents the police from arresting them and allows them to escape for Rinku's safety. As a result, Kabira calls the trio and doubles the initial ransom as punishment for involving the police. Following this, Shyam and Baburao give up on the plan and plan to too Prasad the truth, but Raju shames them back into helping him. The trio calls Devi Prasad again and demands a foolproof double ransom of ₹40 lakhs. They instruct him to meet in an underground stadium parking lot, which Kabira has now chosen for the exchange. This time, Devi Prasad plans to trick the police by sending his servant in his car to be pursued by them. When the trio meets Prasad, he refuses to hand over the money, demanding to see his granddaughter first. As a result, the trio is forced to confess they're not actually the kidnappers, and promise they will return Rinku back to him. Believing them, Prasad hands them the money. The trio gives one-half to Kabira's gang for Rinku's release. However, Kabira is alerted when Rinku identifies the trio as imposters and not her grandfather during the exchange, leading to combat including the trio, Kabira's gang, the police, and the henchmen of Khadak Singh (who is infuriated by Shyam's delay in returning the borrowed money). The police eventually arrest Kabira, his gang, and Singh's henchmen, while Singh himself escapes. The trio reunites Rinku with Prasad.

Raju manages to collect both bags of money and escapes in the trio's rented car, while Shyam and Baburao return home waiting for Raju to return. When Raju does not return for several hours, they call his mother at the nursing home and learn that Raju has already taken her back with him. Feeling betrayed, Shyam and Baburao call the police and confess their involvement in Rinku's kidnapping, hoping they will find and arrest Raju. Immediately after they hang up, an ecstatic Raju returns with the money, who informs them that he went to repay Shyam's debt to Khadak Singh and found his mother's discharge papers. A remorseful Shyam and Baburao explain their earlier misunderstanding to Raju, who breaks down in tears as his mother will see him get arrested. As expected, the police arrive; the trio request the police to take them out through the back door, so that Raju's mother, who is sleeping in the car, will not see them.

Anuradha arrives, enraged after witnessing the scene. However, Devi Prasad arrives and states that the trio is innocent. Having no reason to hold them anymore, the police release the trio. Prasad allows them to keep the remaining ₹39.65 lakhs as a reward for saving Rinku. Just then, the home telephone rings, and the trio believes it to be for Prasad, but he informs them that it is for them this time. The trio nervously answers the phone, but it turns out to be a prank call from Rinku, who shouts, "Kabira speaking!", imitating Kabira's catchphrase when his phone is answered. The film ends with the trio breaking into laughter.

== Cast ==
- Akshay Kumar as Raju
- Suniel Shetty as Ghanshyam a.k.a "Shyam"
- Paresh Rawal as Baburao Ganpatrao Apte a.k.a "Babu Bhaiya"
- Tabu as Anuradha Shivshankar Panicker
- Asrani as Bank Manager
- Om Puri as Kharak Singh, Shyam's friend
- Kulbhushan Kharbanda as Devi Prasad
- Gulshan Grover as Gangster Kabira
- Razak Khan as Chhota Chetan, Kabira's close aide
- Kashmira Shah as Kabira's gang member
- Mukesh Khanna as Police Commissioner Prakash
- Sulabha Arya as Savitri Devi, Raju's mother
- Ann Alexia Anra as Rinku, Devi Prasad's granddaughter
- Dinesh Hingoo as Chaman Jhinga
- Snehal Dabi as a man misjudging the bank manager at the bus stand as a pimp
- Mushtaq Khan as Devi Prasad's servant
- Sharad Sankla as bank peon
- Bhairavi Vaidya as Mrs Panikar, Anuradha's mother
- Kahkashan Patel in a special appearance in the song "Jab Bhi Koi Haseena"
- Rajeev Mehta as a laundry business owner and Raju's boss
- Namrata Shirodkar as Miss Jhinga, Chaman's daughter, special appearance in the song "Tun Tunak Tun"

== Production ==
Hera Pheri was the first time that Priyadarshan worked with Akshay Kumar and Suniel Shetty. He had worked with Paresh Rawal in Doli Saja Ke Rakhna. It also marked the beginning of a long association between Priyadarshan and the three actors. Following Hera Pheri, Priyadarshan has made sure that either Kumar, Shetty, Rawal or a combination of the three actors would star in his films. The only exceptions are Dhol (2007), Billu (2009), Tezz (2012) and Rangrezz (2013).

Parts of the film were shot in Dubai and South Africa.

== Music ==
=== Score ===
The film score was composed by Surinder Sodhi.

=== Songs ===
Hera Pheri

Soundtrack album by Anu Malik, Lalit Sen and Bally Sagoo
- Released: 2000
- Genre: Feature film soundtrack
- Label: Saregama

All lyrics are written by Sameer.

Songs
No.	Title	Music	Singer(s)	Length
1.	"Mujhse Milti Hai Ek Ladki Rozana" (Not used in the film)	Anu Malik	Udit Narayan, Alka Yagnik	6:00
2.	"Jab Bhi Koi Haseena"	Anu Malik	K.K.	6:40
3.	"Main Ladki Pom Pom"	Anu Malik	Abhijeet Bhattacharya, Kavita Krishnamurthy	6:12
4.	"Denewala Jab Bhi Deta Deta Chhappar Phaad Ke"	Anu Malik	Abhijeet Bhattacharya, Vinod Rathod, Hariharan	6:50
5.	"Humba Leela"	Anu Malik	Abhijeet Bhattacharya, Vinod Rathod, Hariharan	7:58
6.	"Tun Tunak Tun"	Lalit Sen, Bally Sagoo	Richa Sharma, K.K. (in film)	7:06
7.	"Sun Zara" (Not used in the film)	Anu Malik	Udit Narayan, Alka Yagnik	7:15
8.	"Tun Tunak Tun (Dance Mix)"	Lalit Sen	Richa Sharma	2:43
Total length:				50:44

== Reception and legacy ==
Hera Pheri was not successful immediately upon release, but later became a box office success, grossing ₹ 24.25 crore in India. Much of the acclaim went to Akshay Kumar and Paresh Rawal for their comic timing and acting. The film is considered Kumar's foray into the comedy genre and critics have called Rawal as "Baburao" his best performance.

Aparajita Saha of Rediff stated, "The movie belongs entirely to Paresh Rawal. Whatever laughter the film solicits is solely due to him. He has impeccable timing and a natural flair for comedy. Suniel Shetty's role and his performance is also too good." Indiainfo wrote, "Paresh Rawal is brilliant in the film. Akshay Kumar is better than Suniel Shetty and Namrata, in a song appearance, appears cold. On the whole, this film is mainly for the city audiences who can understand and appreciate subtle humour."

The film has achieved a cult status among Indian audiences and is regarded as one of the best Hindi comedy films ever made. The dialogue of the film became widely famous throughout the years and is frequently used in Indian memes.

Several critics have highlighted Rawal's Baburao Ganpatrao Apte as one of Hindi cinema's's most memorable characters. His lines have been used in popular culture. Pinkvilla described it as an "iconic character to the audience." Baburao ranked first in the Filmfare's list most memorable roles of Rawal. Indian cricketer Suryakumar Yadav mimicked this dialogue on The Kapil Sharma Show.

== Awards and nominations ==
Awards	Category	Recipients and nominees	Results
International Indian Film Academy Awards	Best Actor in a Comic Role	Paresh Rawal	Won
Filmfare Awards	Best Comedian	Paresh Rawal	Won
Screen Awards	Best Comic Actor	Paresh Rawal	Won
Screen Awards	Best Screenplay	Neeraj Vora	Won
Screen Awards	Best Dialogue	Neeraj Vora	Won
Screen Awards	Best Performance in a Comic Role	Om Puri	Nominated
Screen Awards	Best Story	Anand S. Vardhan	Nominated
Screen Awards	Best Editing	N. Gopalakrishnan	Nominated

== Sequel ==
The film later launched a film franchise, including the sequel Phir Hera Pheri. The film released on 9 June 2006, which starred Bipasha Basu, Rimi Sen and Johny Lever alongside the original cast. A third film is currently in production.
