= Sardar (1993 film) =

1993 Indian film by Ketan Mehta

- Poster of the film
- Directed by: Ketan Mehta
- Written by: Vijay Tendulkar (script); Hriday Lani (dialogues)
- Produced by: H. M. Patel
- Starring: Paresh Rawal; Annu Kapoor; Benjamin Gilani; Tom Alter
- Cinematography: Jehangir Choudhary
- Edited by: Renu Saluja
- Music by: Vanraj Bhatia
- Release date: 7 January 1993
- Running time: 175 minutes
- Country: India
- Language: Hindi

Sardar is a 1993 Indian Hindi language biographical drama film on Sardar Vallabhbhai Patel, one of India's greatest freedom fighters, directed by Ketan Mehta and written by noted playwright Vijay Tendulkar and Hriday Lani. The film was screened retrospective on 12 August 2016 at the Independence Day Film Festival jointly presented by the Indian Directorate of Film Festivals and Ministry of Defence, commemorating 70th Indian Independence Day.

== Plot ==
The film begins with a young Sardar Patel playing cards with his friends and ridiculing Mahatma Gandhi and his policies to achieve independence. His views change however, when he is introduced to Gandhi by his brother, and upon listening to a lecture delivered by Gandhi, he joins him in his struggle. Sardar then successfully organises various Satyagrahas throughout Gujarat. The film then moves to the age of the Quit India Movement and India's freedom. Sardar is instrumental in convincing the working committee of the Indian National Congress (INC) and Nehru to accept a proposal for the partition of India, when riots break out on the league's call for Direct Action. Sardar realises that not tackling the problem now might result in civil war in the country. Once the partition has been accepted, Sardar then works to get all the princely states to join the Union of India, the film depicts his handling of the problems posed by the princely states of Kashmir, Junagadh and Hyderabad. The film also portrays his differences with Nehru and how they work together after the death of Gandhiji. The film ends with Sardar resting at the desert village of Shahpura in Rajasthan saying that today from Kashmir to Kanyakumari, there is one independent nation.

== Cast ==
- Paresh Rawal as Sardar Patel
- Annu Kapoor as Mahatma Gandhi
- Benjamin Gilani as Pt. Jawaharlal Nehru
- Sri Vallabh Vyas as Mohammad Ali Jinnah
- Tom Alter as Viceroy Lord Mountbatten
- H.M. Patel as himself
- Lalit Tiwari as Maulana Azad
- Ashish Vidyarthi as V. P. Menon
- Govind Namdev
- Satish Kaushik
- Suhasini Mulay
- Raghuvir Yadav as Patel's servant
- Vanya Joshi as Rajkumari Amrit Kaur
- M. K. Raina
- Narendra Sachar as Khan Abdul Gaffar Khan

== Soundtrack ==
The music of the film was composed by Vanraj Bhatia.

== Reception ==
=== Review ===
Madhu Jain of India Today praised the movie and wrote "Scripted by Vijay Tendulkar, this fascinating over three-hour-long film with a Rs 2-crore budget, is well-made and fast-paced with Mehta's usual cinematic flourishes. More important - it is trying to set history right."

=== Awards ===
National Film Awards 1993

- Best Film On National Integration
- Best Editing – Renu Saluja

== See also ==
- List of Asian historical drama films
- List of artistic depictions of Mahatma Gandhi
