= Awara Paagal Deewana =

2002 Indian film by Vikram Bhatt

- DVD cover
- Directed by: Vikram Bhatt
- Written by: Anand Vardhan; Mangesh Kulkarni (Story & Screenplay); Neeraj Vora (Dialogues)
- Produced by: A. G. Nadiadwala; Firoz A. Nadiadwala
- Starring: Akshay Kumar; Sunil Shetty; Aftab Shivdasani; Paresh Rawal; Preeti Jhangiani; Aarti Chhabria; Amrita Arora; Johnny Lever; Rahul Dev
- Cinematography: Pravin Bhatt
- Edited by: Amit Saxena
- Music by: Songs: Anu Malik; Score: Franco Vaz
- Production company: Base Industries Group
- Distributed by: Shemaroo Entertainment; Pen Studios
- Release date: 21 June 2002
- Running time: 164 mins
- Country: India
- Language: Hindi
- Budget: ₹13 crore
- Box office: ₹27.5 crore

Awara Paagal Deewana (Wayward, Crazy, Insane) is a 2002 Indian Hindi-language action comedy film directed by Vikram Bhatt. Anu Malik composed the film's score with lyrics by Sameer. The plot is loosely based on the 2000 American film The Whole Nine Yards. Dion Lam, who worked on The Matrix and Hong Kong action films was the stunt director. The film's cast includes Akshay Kumar, Sunil Shetty, Aftab Shivdasani, Paresh Rawal, Johnny Lever, Preeti Jhangiani, Aarti Chhabria, Amrita Arora and Rahul Dev.

Awara Paagal Deewana was released on 21 June 2002 to a global audience. It received mixed reviews from critics. The film was notable for lavish and exotic song sequences, action scenes involving Akshay Kumar and Suniel Shetty, and the performances of Paresh Rawal and Johnny Lever.

== Plot ==
The MacGuffin is $200 million worth of diamonds held in a New York bank, left in the will of Indian underworld don, Baba Baldev Prasad. His bequest is to be distributed equally between his son, Vikrant, his daughter, Preeti, and Preeti's husband, Guru Gulab Khatri. To claim the diamonds, all three beneficiaries must present themselves to the bank.

Shortly after the don's death, Vikrant plots to disguise himself as Guru and assassinate the Indian home minister while he is live on television. Guru is falsely accused and evades prosecution by fleeing to the United States under an assumed identity.

In the United States, Guru is identified by Anmol, a dentist. Anmol's mother-in-law sends Anmol and her husband, Manilal to India to collect a reward for finding Guru. However, Vikrant reneges and sends Anmol and Manilal back to the United States, accompanied by Vikrant's henchmen, Yeda Anna and Chota Chathri, who are tasked with killing Guru. It is later revealed that Yeda Anna is a double agent working for Guru.

Vikrant and Preeti arrive in the United States to receive their inheritance of diamonds. At their hotel, Vikrant is kidnapped and killed by a mysterious group of Chinese thugs. However, Yeda Anna discovers that the kidnapped Vikrant is an imposter.

With Vikrant seemingly dead, Preeti and Guru claim one half of the diamonds each. As they leave the bank, a group of policemen apprehend them and take them to a remote location. Then, the real Vikrant appears. In a confrontation with Guru, Vikrant is killed by Guru.

In the aftermath, Anmol, who wishes to marry Preeti, asks Guru to divorce Preeti in exchange for her portion of the diamonds. Yeda Anna double-crosses Guru, and tries, in vain, to steal the diamonds from him.

In the end, Anmol and Preeti return to India together. Guru gives them some of his diamonds and Preeti is grateful.

== Cast ==
- Akshay Kumar as Guru Gulab Khatri, an underworld don.
- Suniel Shetty as Yeda Anna, a double agent working for Guru Gulab and Vikrant Prasad.
- Aftab Shivdasani as Dr. Anmol Acharya, a dentist who worries about family issues.
- Paresh Rawal as Manilal Patel, Anmol's ex-father-in-law, Paramjeet's husband, and Mona's father. He always forgets the names of the people around him and also forgets his own name.
- Johnny Lever as Chhota Chhatri, a stammering goon, who is working for Yeda Anna.
- Preeti Jhangiani as Preeti Acharya, Baldev's daughter, Vikrant's sister, Guru Gulab's ex-wife, and Anmol's wife.
- Aarti Chabria as Tina, Anmol's secretary, Guru’s love interest.
- Amrita Arora as Mona Patel, Manilal and Paramjeet's daughter, and Anmol's ex-wife, whom she pesters.
- Rahul Dev as Vikrant Prasad, Baldev's son, Preeti's brother, and Guru Gulab's ex-brother-in-law.
- Supriya Pilgaonkar as Paramjeet Patel, Manilal's wife, Anmol's ex-mother-in-law, and Mona's mother.
- Om Puri gives a cameo appearance as the dying Don Baba Baldev Prasad.
- Asrani gives a cameo performance as Champaklal, Baldev's greedy lawyer.

== Production ==
This film was shot principally in New York, Oman, and some scenes in Mumbai. Filming wrapped on 10 July 2001.

== Soundtrack ==
Awara Paagal Deewana

Soundtrack album by Anu Malik
- Released: 6 March 2002
- Genre: Feature film soundtrack
- Label: Saregama

Anu Malik composed the film score with lyrics by Sameer.

No.	Title	Singer(s)	Length
1.	"Awara Paagal Deewana"	Shaan, Sunidhi Chauhan	4:00
2.	"Jise Hasna Rona"	Udit Narayan, Sonu Nigam, Shaan, Alka Yagnik, Sunidhi Chauhan, Sarika Kapoor	7:30
3.	"Love" (Theme)	–	1:10
4.	"Maine To Khai Kasam"	Sunidhi Chauhan, Abhijeet	5:02
5.	"More Sawariya"	Sunidhi Chauhan, Shaan, Anu Malik	6:36
6.	"Ya Habibi"	Adnan Sami, Shabbir Kumar, Sunidhi Chauhan	7:19
7.	"Yeh Tune Kya Kiya (not used in the film)"	Sonu Nigam, Anuradha Paudwal	7:18

== Critical response ==
Taran Adarsh of IndiaFM gave the film 2 stars out of 5, writing, "On the whole, Awara Paagal Deewana has an excellent first half, but a just-about-okay second half. From the box-office point of view, the fabulous stunts, excellent music, and an aggressive promotion will help the film reach the safety mark. Business in metros should prove to be the best. Well worth a watch!" Anjum N of Rediff.com wrote, ″Director Bhatt should concentrate on what he does best - making small budget, non-star cast films (Ghulam being an exception). Here, he shows his capability in handling the comic scenes well - there weren't many light scenes in his earlier films. But overall, he fails to hold the audience's attention. See the film only if you are a diehard fan of Rawal's comic talent or Akshay's action scenes."

== Awards ==
Year	Nominee / work	Award	Result
2003	Paresh Rawal	Filmfare Award for Best Performance in a Comic Role	Won
2003	Paresh Rawal	Zee Cine Award for Best Actor in a Comic Role	Won
2004	Paresh Rawal	Screen Award for Best Comedian	Won
2004	Johnny Lever	Screen Award for Best Comedian	Nominated
