= Rikshavodu =

- Theatrical release poster
- Directed by: Kodi Ramakrishna
- Produced by: Kranthi Kumar
- Starring: Chiranjeevi; Nagma; Soundarya; Jayasudha; Manorama; Paresh Rawal; Brahmanandam; AVS
- Cinematography: M. V. Raghu
- Music by: Koti
- Production company: Sri Kranthi Chitra
- Release date: 14 December 1995
- Country: India
- Language: Telugu

Rikshavodu (transl. Rickshaw puller) is a 1995 Telugu language film starring Chiranjeevi, Nagma and Soundarya, directed by Kodi Ramakrishna and produced by Kranthi Kumar. Chiranjeevi played a dual role in the film. It was dubbed in Hindi as Devaa The Power Man and in Tamil as Veeraputhran.

Rikshavodu received unanimous negative response upon its release eventually becoming a big box office disaster. The film was also heavily criticized for its plot, direction and lead actors performances.

== Plot ==
Raju moves to the city in search of a livelihood with his grandmother. He is befriended by an auto rickshaw driver, Ramakrishna, and taken to Narsakka, who rents rickshaws. She agrees to rent him a rickshaw after seeing his difficult life. One day while driving passengers in his rickshaw, he has a confrontation with Rani, who hits his rickshaw by driving her car aggressively. He files a suit against her in the court, but fails due to the influence of her wealthy and arrogant father, G. K. Rao. After a couple of confrontations with Rao, Rani is forcibly married off to Raju by Rao in the hopes of building political mileage in Raju's area after seeing his mass following.

Raju's grandmother chances upon Rao one day and is remembered of the tragic past of her son, Raju's father, and daughter-in-law. His father, Dharma Rayudu, is the village head and a good samaritan. Envied by the good name he has in the village, Rao forces his wife to file a false rape case against Dharma Rayudu, then traps Dharma Rayudu’s sister in the name of love and sees to it that she commits suicide. Rao also blames Dharma Rayudu‘s wife by falsely implicating her in an illicit affair. Rao eventually kills Dharma Rayudu in a village fight and the blame the latter’s taken by his wife (who Dharma Rayudu stopped from also committing suicide), who is jailed and all the villagers think that she is the cause of all the doom. Hearing this, a devastated and infuriated Raju decides to take revenge on Rao. He goes back to the village with his family and unveils the truth before the villagers. Rani, after coming to know of her father’s crimes, reconciles with Raju and becomes a loving wife.

== Cast ==
- Chiranjeevi as Raju & Dharma Rayudu (dual role)
- Nagma as Rani
- Soundarya as Narsakka
- Jayasudha as Raju's Mother
- Manorama as Bamma
- Brahmanandam as Ramakrishna, Raju's Rickshaw Friend
- Paresh Rawal as G. K. Rao
- A.V.S as G. K. Rao's Assistant
- Gundu Hanumantha Rao
- Subbaraya Sharma
- Visweswara Rao as Villager

== Music ==
Music scored by Raj-Koti; Lyrics written by Veturi Sundararama Murthy and Bhuvana Chandra.

No.	Title	Singer(s)	Length
1.	"Ne Petta"	S. P. Balasubrahmanyam, Chithra
2.	"Ardha Rathri"	Sujatha, S. P. Balasubrahmanyam
3.	"Roop Tera Mastana"	Baba Sehgal, Sujatha
4.	"Devudyna Jeevu"	S. P. Balasubrahmanyam
5.	"Pa Pa Edirinpa"	S. P. Balasubrahmanyam
6.	"Entabba Taku"	K. S. Chithra, S. P. Balasubrahmanyam

== Release ==
Rikshavodu clashed with Dasari Narayana Rao and R. Narayana Murthy's major production Orey Rikshaw that released in December 1995. While both Orey Rikshaw and Rikshavodu featured a rickshaw puller as its protagonist, only Orey Rikshaw emerged successful at the box office. "Rikshavodu" is an outright disaster.
