= Phir Hera Pheri =

2006 Indian film by Neeraj Vora

- Theatrical release poster
- Directed by: Neeraj Vora
- Written by: Neeraj Vora
- Produced by: Firoz A. Nadiadwala
- Starring: Akshay Kumar; Suniel Shetty; Paresh Rawal; Bipasha Basu; Rimi Sen; Sharat Saxena; Johnny Lever; Rajpal Yadav; Milind Gunaji; Manoj Joshi; Razak Khan
- Narrated by: Nana Patekar
- Cinematography: Velraj
- Edited by: Diwakar P. Bhonsle; Virendra Gharse
- Music by: Songs: Himesh Reshammiya; Background Score: Surinder Sodhi
- Production company: Base Industries Group
- Release date: 9 June 2006
- Running time: 157 minutes
- Country: India
- Language: Hindi
- Budget: ₹18 crore
- Box office: ₹69.12 crore

Phir Hera Pheri (translation: Foul Play Once Again) is a 2006 Indian Hindi-language comedy film written and directed by Neeraj Vora. The film serves as the sequel to Hera Pheri (2000) and the second installment of the Hera Pheri franchise. The film stars an ensemble cast of Akshay Kumar, Suniel Shetty, Paresh Rawal (reprising their roles from the previous film), Bipasha Basu, Rimi Sen, Sharat Saxena, Johnny Lever, Rajpal Yadav, Milind Gunaji, Manoj Joshi and Razak Khan.

Following the events of the previous film, a twist of fate changes the lives of Raju (Kumar), Shyam (Shetty) and Baburao (Rawal) when they get cheated by a fraudster, Anuradha (Basu). They must now find another way to repay the money borrowed from a dreaded gangster, Tiwari (Saxena).

Upon its release on 9 June 2006, the film was a major commercial success, becoming one of the highest grossing film of the year. Over the years, the film has attained a cult status, often celebrated for quotable lines in meme culture and rewatch value. The film is loosely based on the British film Lock, Stock and Two Smoking Barrels (1998).

== Plot ==
The film opens with a prologue bringing the audience up to speed on the story, stating that each has suffered a personal loss despite their new riches. Ghanshyam alias Shyam, lost his only love Anuradha Shivshanker Panikar in an accident, Raju lost his ailing mother, and Baburao Ganpatrao Apte having nothing to lose in the first place - lost the little traces of common sense that he did possess.

The three men are living a lavish life in a massive mansion and splurging on various luxuries. One day, Raju hears about an idea for doubling his wealth in 21 days from a con woman, Anuradha Munjal, who is claiming to be a bank manager, and convinces Shyam and Baburao to go along with it. Raju first arranges for ₹30 lakh from Shyam and Baburao and then a further ₹50 lakh by selling their bungalow. He convinces a small-time goon, Pappu, to contribute the remaining balance of ₹20 lakh so that he can come up with the minimum deposit of ₹1 crore, which Anuradha has promised to double.

Three weeks after investing the money, the three of them discover they were duped and are now in financial ruin. As they no longer own their bungalow, the trio have to live in a chawl (tenement). Pappu arrives at the bungalow the next day to pick up his portion of the money only to find the bungalow occupied by a Parsi gun collector. Pappu is now in trouble because he had borrowed money from a lisping but dreaded gangster, Tiwari, who will kill him if he doesn't pay up. When he comes across Raju, he pretends to be sympathetic upon hearing that they were scammed. He tricks him and brings the three to Tiwari, who tells them they have to come up with the money or else they will be killed. As they are escorted home by Tiwari's goons, the three manage to escape. The trio are about to leave the city when Raju remembers that he owes rent to Anjali, the chawl accountant's daughter. They head over to her house and are surprised to find that she is Pappu's sister. Tiwari's goons show up and kidnap Anjali because Pappu had not returned the money. Feeling guilty that he is the one who got Anjali in trouble, Raju decides that he will go to Tiwari and try to get her freed. Shyam and Baburao refuse to leave without him and decide to stay as well. The three go back to Tiwari to ask him to release Anjali, and Tiwari tells them to bring the money in order to release Anjali.

Raju, Shyam, and Baburao now have three days to come up with ₹40 lakh. Raju overhears the neighbor, Munna Bhai, plotting to steal drugs from his rival, Nanji Bhai, and, wrongly assuming they are talking about stealing money, plans to steal from Munna Bhai. Meanwhile, Tiwari sends Pappu along with his men to steal a collection of 15 antique guns from the Parsi gun collector. However, Pappu's men unwittingly sells the three most valuable guns from the collection (worth ₹5–6 crore) to Kachra Seth, a scrap dealer who also deals in stolen goods, to Tiwari's anger. Raju, Shyam and Baburao, in turn, purchased the three guns locally from Kachra Seth for their mission. The trio barely succeed but are confused when they don't find money inside. Raju recognizes the drugs and tells them that they are worth at least ₹3 crores (thirty million). They think that if they can sell them to Kachra Seth and pay off Tiwari, they can also become rich.

The trio and Anjali then run into Anuradha, who reveals the entire scam was hatched by Kabira's (the gangster from the first film) close aide Chhota Chetan to get revenge on the trio and that the only reason she went along with it was that they were holding her niece hostage (Anuradha's sister was Kabira's gang member and part of the first film's kidnapping plot). Their money was converted to diamonds to pay the ransom, but she fled with them once she discovered her niece had escaped and with her uncle, hid them under a decoration of a circus train (named "Kook-Doo-Koo"). Meanwhile, Kachra Seth takes Raju's drug sample to his boss, Nanji Bhai, who identifies it to have been stolen from himself. He forces Kachra Seth to make the trio return the drugs to him in exchange for commission. Munna Bhai accidentally discovers the remaining drugs stolen by the trio at their house and takes them back along with the three guns. Tiwari's henchmen also reach to collect the money at the same time the group returns, and beat up Munna Bhai's henchmen and kidnap the girls.

Deciding to use fake suitcases to trick Kachra Seth and Nanji Bhai into giving them money to pay off Tiwari's loan, the trio arrange the exchanges at the Great Royal Circus, with Munna Bhai's henchmen and Chhota Chetan overhearing them. The Parsi gun collector and Pappu see Munna Bhai with the guns and follow him to the circus, while the group of actors who drop the trio off there also learn about the money there and decide to follow. At the circus, the trio realizes too late that Kachra Seth and Nanji Bhai have given them fake banknotes. The trio decides to give the fake money to Tiwari, hoping he will assume it's real. Tiwari does so and releases the girls, but after Kachra Seth and Nanji Bhai discover the fake suitcases, they confront the trio and get into an argument with Baburao, who accidentally reveals the money is also fake, resulting in a prolonged cat-and-mouse chase in the circus premises where everyone attempts to get hold of the drugs and the diamonds. These are strewn all over the ground in public by an escaped gorilla that Munna Bhai provoked. Soon the police arrive, and they arrest Tiwari, Nanji Bhai, Pappu, Munna Bhai, Chhota Chetan, and the Parsi gun collector, while the trio flee along with Anjali, Anuradha, and her niece.

Raju escapes with Pappu's cellphone and the guns with him, unaware of the guns' value, having been dispatched by Baburao to discard them. Before he is taken away, Pappu informs Shyam and Baburao about the guns, after which the two frantically call Raju from a payphone to dissuade him from disposing the guns. The film ends in a cliffhanger with Raju leaning over a bridge, holding Pappu's cellphone ringing in his mouth, as he attempts to drop the guns into the river.

== Cast ==
- Akshay Kumar as Raju
- Suniel Shetty as Ghanshyam a.k.a "Shyam"
- Paresh Rawal as Baburao Ganpatrao Apte a.k.a "Babu Bhaiya"
- Bipasha Basu as Anuradha "Anu" Munjal
- Rimi Sen as Anjali Patekar
- Sharat Saxena as Tiwari Seth a.k.a "Totla Seth"
- Johnny Lever as Munna Bhai
- Rajpal Yadav as Pappu Patekar (Anjali's brother)
- Manoj Joshi as Kachra Seth
- Milind Gunaji as Naanji Bhai
- Razak Khan as Chhota Chetan (Kabira's sidekick)
- Ravi Kishan as Chhote (Tiwari's sidekick)
- Suresh Menon as Peter (Naanji Bhai's most trusted sidekick and Munna Bhai's secret informer)
- Dinesh Hingoo as Parsi Gun Collector
- Tiku Talsania as Police Inspector (special appearance)
- Javed Khan Amrohi as Khetwadi Police Chowki constable
- Gulshan Grover as Gangster Kabira (archive footage from Hera Pheri)
- Kashmira Shah as Kabira's gang member and Anuradha's sister (archive footage from Hera Pheri)
- Sunil Pal as Kishan, Munna Bhai's henchman
- Kiku Sharda as Kaanji, Munna Bhai's henchman
- Viju Khote as Ravana from Ram-Leela, troupe member
- Madan Singh as Tiwari's tall henchman (voice dubbed by Shailendra Pandey)
- Manmouji as Ram-Leela troupe member
- Mukesh Ahuja as a circus magician
- Angelina Idnani as Bipasha Basu’s niece
- Nana Patekar as a narrator
- Dia Mirza as an item girl in the song "Pyaar Ki Chatni" (special appearance)
- Neeraj Vora as a bus passenger speaking on the phone (special appearance)
- Ghanshyam Rohera as a bus conductor (special appearance)
- Tabu as Anuradha Shivshankar Panikar (archive footage)
- Shraddha Kapoor as background dancer in the song "Pyaar Ki Chatni" (uncredited appearance)

== Soundtrack ==
Phir Hera Pheri

Soundtrack album by Himesh Reshammiya
- Released: 2006
- Recorded: 2006
- Venue: Mumbai
- Genre: Feature film soundtrack
- Label: T-Series
- Producer: Himesh Reshammiya

Himesh Reshammiya chronology
Chup Chup Ke (2006)	Phir Hera Pheri (2006)	Tom Dick And Harry (2006)

According to the Indian trade website Box Office India, with around 10,00,000 units sold, this film's soundtrack album was the year's fifteenth highest-selling.

=== Track listing ===
All lyrics are written by Sameer; all music is composed by Himesh Reshammiya.

No.	Title	Singer(s)	Length
1.	"Phir Hera Pheri"	Sonu Nigam, Shaan	5:41
2.	"Dil De Diya"	Sunidhi Chauhan, Kunal Ganjawala, Arya	6:15
3.	"Mujhko Yaad Sataye Teri"	Himesh Reshammiya	4:38
4.	"Dil Naiyyo Maane Re"	Himesh Reshammiya, Tulsi Kumar	4:51
5.	"Aye Meri Zohrajabeen"	Himesh Reshammiya	5:23
6.	"Pyaar Ki Chatni"	Sunidhi Chauhan	5:16
Total length:			32:04

== Box office ==
The film earned ₹70 crore at the end of its theatrical run.

== Sequel ==
A sequel titled Hera Pheri 3 is planned, but the production was postponed after director Neeraj Vora died on 14 December 2017 after a prolonged illness. After the response from Firoz Nadiadwala, the sequel is under production and will be released soon.

On 23 May 2018, it was confirmed that Hera Pheri 3 will now be directed by Indra Kumar and star the same team of Akshay Kumar, Sunil Shetty, and Paresh Rawal in the lead. It was reported that the film will be shot on a start-to-finish schedule and Kumar confirmed to The Indian Express that the film will be ready for release in the second half of 2019 (but it didn't release in 2019). The film will continue the story of the previous two. Later, Indra Kumar left the project for unknown reasons and confirmed that Priyadarshan, who directed the first movie, will return as the director of the third.

On 21 February 2023, some reports shooting on a promo for Hera Pheri 3 with Akshay Kumar, Sunil Shetty and Paresh Rawal had started.

On 17 July 2025, Times of India quoted Priyadarshan as saying "The film is still at writing stage, but we plan to start it by March 2026".
