= Suresh Gopi filmography =

Suresh Gopi is an Indian actor, playback singer and television host who has predominantly acts in Malayalam Cinema, in addition to a few Tamil cinema, Telugu cinema, Kannada cinema and Hindi cinema films.

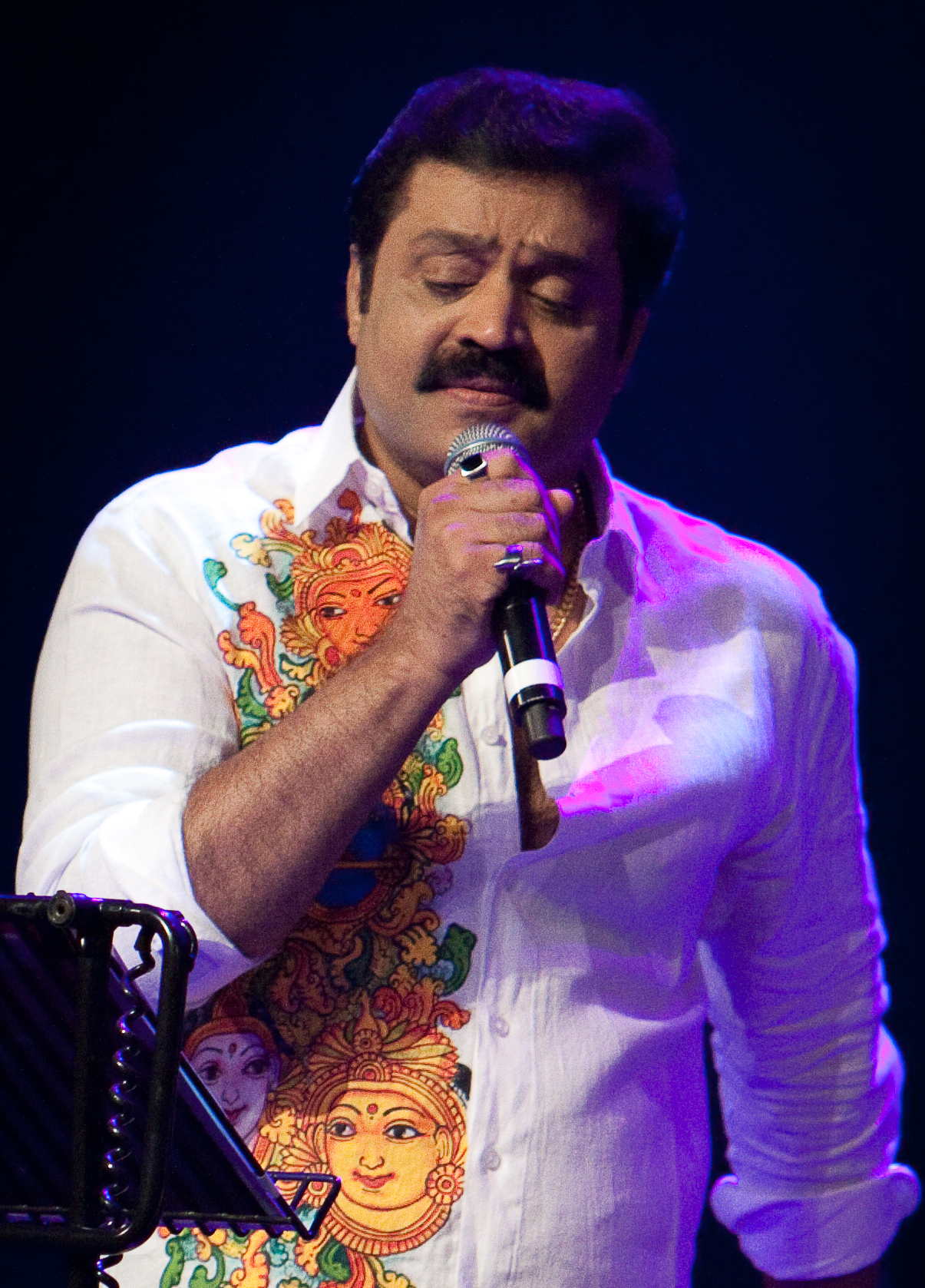

== Malayalam films ==
Key
†	Denotes films that have not yet been released

Year	Title	Role	Notes	Ref.
1965	Odayil Ninnu	Son of the feudal lord	Child artist	
1986	T. P. Balagopalan M.A.	Prospective Groom	Cameo appearance	
1986	Niramulla Raavukal	Customer	Cameo appearance	
1986	Yuvajanotsavam	Dileep		
1986	Rajavinte Makan	Kumar		
1986	Onnu Muthal Poojyam Vare	Man at the beach		
1986	Poovinu Puthiya Poonthennal	Suresh		
1986	Manasilloru Manimuthu	Sreedharan		
1986	Adiverukal	Jayan		
1986	Sayam Sandhya	Ravi		
1986	Nandi Veendum Varika	Balan		
1987	Vrutham	Sunny Abraham		
1987	Yaagagni	Shantan	Lead Role	
1987	Vazhiyorakazchakal	Ashok		
1987	P.C. 369	Gopikuttan		
1987	January Oru Orma	Raju		
1987	Irupatham Noottandu	Shekaran Kutty		
1987	Ivide Ellavarkum Sukham	Haridas		
1987	Bhoomiyile Rajakkanmar	Jayan		
1987	Sreedharante Onnam Thirumurivu	Vinayachandran		
1987	New Delhi	Suresh		
1987	Nirabhedhangal			
1988	1921	Unnikrishnan		
1988	Witness	Alex Williams		
1988	Moonnam Mura	Vaishakan		
1988	Manu Uncle	S.I Minnal Prathapan	Cameo appearance	
1988	Dhwani	Dinesh		
1988	Alila Kuruvikal	Rangan		
1988	Anuragi	Roy		
1988	Oru CBI Diary Kurippu	Harry		
1988	Sanghunadam	Rajeevan		
1988	Oru Vivada Vishayam	Vinod		
1988	Unnikrishnante Adyathe Christmas	Parasuraman		
1989	Jagratha	Harry	Cameo appearance	
1989	Miss Pameela	Ranji		
1989	Varnam	Manu Vishwanath		
1989	Radham	Vishnu		
1989	Vaadaka Gunda			
1989	Nagapanjami			
1989	New Year	Vinod		
1989	Nerunnu Nanmakal	Vishnu		
1989	The News	Rishi Menon		
1989	Kaalal Pada	Baby		
1989	Douthyam	Capt. Suresh G. Nair		
1989	Vachanam	Ravi		
1989	Annakutty Kodambakkam Vilikkunnu	Babu		
1989	Innale	Dr. Narendran		
1989	Aksharathettu	Prakash Menon		
1989	Oru Vadakkan Veeragatha	Aromal Chekavar		
1989	Nagarangalil Chennu Raparkam	Christopher Luke		
1989	Nair Saab	Cadet Gopakumar		
1990	Minda Poochakku Kalyanam	Kumar		
1990	Vacation			
1990	Varthamana Kalam	Balagopal		
1990	Orukkam	Sethumadhava Kuruppu		
1990	Rajavazhcha	Govindankutty		
1990	Midhya	Rajashekharan		
1990	Thoovalsparsham	Ananda Padmanabhan		
1990	Arhatha	Mahesh		
1990	Kouthuka Varthakal	Ravi		
1990	Saandhram	Sreeraman		
1990	In Harihar Nagar	Sethumadhavan		
1990	Ee Thanutha Veluppan Kalathu	Christy		
1990	Parampara	Chanthu		
1991	Sundhari Kakka	Peter Joseph		
1991	Parallel College	Ananthan		
1991	Kuttapathram	Alex		
1991	Ente Sooryaputhrikku	Dr. Srinivasan		
1991	Aanaval Mothiram	Nandakumar		
1991	Bhoomika	Gopi		
1991	Athirathan	Sethu		
1991	Chakravarthy	Unni Shankar		
1991	Kadalora Kattu	Balan		
1991	Sandhwanam	Unni		
1992	Utsavamelam	Jayadevan		
1992	Aadhaaram	Vasu		
1992	Ponnurukkum Pakshi	Ananthan		
1992	Savidham	Sethu		
1992	Ente Ponnu Thampuran	Vinod		
1992	Aham	Captain Mahendran		
1992	Thalastaanam	Harikrishnan		
1992	Nakshthrakoodaram	Jeevan Roy		
1992	Pappayude Swantham Appoos	Dr. Gopakumar		
1992	Simhadhwani	Chandran		
1992	Naadody	Shivan		
1992	Daddy	Antony		
1992	Sathyaprathinja	Sreedharan		
1992	Ponnaramthottathe Raajaavu	Jacob		
1992	Mahaan	Jackson Albert		
1993	Paamaram			
1993	Sthalathe Pradhana Payyans	Subair	Cameo appearance	
1993	Dhruvam	Jose Nariman		
1993	Ponnu Chami	Ponnu Chami		
1993	Injakkadan Mathai & Sons	Thankachan		
1993	Paithrukam	Somadathan		
1993	Ekalavyan	Madhavan IPS		
1993	City Police	Arun Kumar		
1993	Samooham	Sudhakaran		
1993	Mafia	Ravi Shankar		
1993	Yaadhavam	Vishnu		
1993	Manichitrathazhu	Nakulan		
1993	Ithu Manjukaalam	Balachandran		
1993	Paamaram			
1993	Aacharyan	DYSP Azad		
1994	Chukkan	Gauri Shankar		
1994	Kashmeeram	Capt. Shyam Mohan Varma		
1994	Commissioner	Bharathchandran IPS		
1994	The City	ASP Ravi Prasad IPS		
1994	Rudraksham	Vishwanathan		
1994	Manathe Kottaram	Satheesh Nair	Cameo appearance	
1995	Aksharam	Ananthakrishnan		
1995	Highway	Sreedhar Prasad		
1995	Karma	Achuthankutty		
1995	Radholsavam	Muthu		
1995	Thakshashila	Gautham Krishna		
1995	Sindoora Rekha	Balachandran		
1995	The King	Madhavan IPS	Cameo appearance	
1995	Sakshyam	Sunny		
1995	Saadaram	Raghunandana Menon		
1996	Yuvathurki	Sidhartha		
1996	Rajaputhran	Anand		
1996	Mahathma	Devadevan		
1997	Suvarna Simhaasanam	Kannoth Ramanathan		
1997	Masmaram	Gautham		
1997	Lelam	Anakkattil Chackochi/Capt. Jacob Stephen		
1997	Kulam	Bhranthan Channan		
1997	Janathipathyam	R.D.Nayanar IPS		
1997	Guru	King Vijayanta		
1997	Gangothri	Adv. Sharath Chandran		
1997	Bhoopathi	Hariprasad		
1997	Bhaaratheeyam	Shyam Mohan		
1997	Anubhoothi	Sivankutty		
1997	Kaliyattam	Kannan Perumalayan	National Film Award for Best Actor	
1998	Thirakalkkappuram	Chengan		
1998	Thalolam	Haridas		
1998	Summer in Bethlehem	Dennis		
1998	Rakthasakshikal Sindabad	Urmees Tharakan		
1998	Pranayavarnangal	Vinayachandran IAS		
1999	Saaphalyam	Balu		
1999	Stalin Sivadas	Dr. Manju's Brother	photo appearance	
1999	Prem Poojari	Himself	Guest appearance in the song "Kathil Vellichittu"	
1999	Pathram	Nandagopal		
1999	Varnatheru	Vishnu		
1999	Vazhunnor	Kuttappayi		
1999	Crime File	Idamatton Palackal Easo Panicker IPS		
1999	F.I.R.	Mohammed Sarkar IPS		
2000	Millennium Stars	Karunan		
2000	Dreamz	Dr. Roy		
2000	Pilots	Bobby Nair		
2000	Mark Antony	Anthony		
2000	Cover Story	Vijay		
2000	Kallu Kondoru Pennu	Dr. Suresh	Cameo appearance	
2000	Thenkasipattanam	Kannappan alias Kannan		
2000	Sathyameva Jayathe	CI Chandrachoodan		
2001	Saivar Thirumeni	Devadathan Namboothiripadu		
2001	Meghasandesam	Balagopal		
2001	Randam Bhavam	Navaneeth Krishnan/Anantha Krishnan	Dual Role	
2001	Sundara Purushan	Suryanarayanan		
2001	Nariman	DYSP Ashok Nariman		
2002	Jameendar		Unreleased	
2002	WWW.Anukudumbam.Com	Rajeev and Rajeev's father	Dual Role	
2003	Swapnam Kondu Thulabharam	Vishnu		
2003	Thillana Thillana	Himself	Guest appearance	
2004	Sasneham Sumithra	Balachandran		
2004	Agninakshathram	Thalakkulathu Thampi		
2005	Makalkku	Warrier		
2005	Ullam	Kuttan		
2005	Bharathchandran I.P.S.	Bharathchandran IPS		
2005	The Tiger	Chandrasekharan IPS		
2006	Lanka	Captain Sarvan		
2006	Rashtram	Maliyekkal Thommi		
2006	Chinthamani Kolacase	Adv. Lal Krishna Viradiyar		
2006	Ashwaroodan	Veerabhadran		
2006	Pathaaka	George Tharakan		
2006	Bada Dosth	Daya Shankar/Bada Dosth		
2006	Smart City	Madhavan		
2006	Notebook	Brigadier Alexander	Cameo appearance	
2007	Detective	Shyam Prasad and Mohan Kumar	Dual role	
2007	Paranju Theeratha Visheshangal	Rajeevan		
2007	Time	Dr. Appan Menon IPS and Vishwanatha Menon IPS	Dual role	
2007	Janmam	Devaraayar		
2007	Bharathan Effect	Dr. Pandala		
2007	Nadiya Kollappetta Rathri	Sharafudeen Tharamasi IPS		
2007	Kichamani MBA	Kichamani		
2007	Black Cat	Ramesh Sharma IPS		
2008	Sound of Boot	SP Siddharth Mahadev IPS		
2008	Aayudham	Rishikesh IPS		
2008	Madampi	Narrator		
2008	Twenty:20	Antony Punnekadan IPS		
2008	Pakal Nakshatrangal	Vaidhyanath		
2008	Thavalam	Sivan		
2008	My Mothers Laptop	Ravi		
2008	Bullet	Parasuraman Bhatteri		
2009	Hailesa	Unnikrishnan		
2009	I G Inspector General	IG Durga Prasad IPS		
2009	Bhoomi Malayalam	Ananthan Master/Narayanan Kutty		
2009	Black Dalia	Dr. Aadikesavan		
2009	Boss	Boss	Unreleased	
2009	Kancheepurathe Kalyanam	Kalarikkal Achuthankutty		
2009	Vairam: Fight for Justice	Adv. Ravi Varma		
2009	Kerala Cafe	Ramesh Menon	Segment : Lalitham Hiranmayam	
2010	Janakan	Vishwanathan		
2010	Kadaksham	NathanSasi		
2010	Mummy & Me	Ameer	Cameo appearance	
2010	Ringtone	Ninan Koshy		
2010	Raama Raavanan	Thiruchelvam		
2010	Sadgamaya	Dr. Ravi Varma		
2010	Kanyakumari Express	DIG Mohan Shanker IPS		
2010	Sahasram	Sahasranamam IPS		
2011	Christian Brothers	DCP Joseph Vadakkan IPS		
2011	Violet		Unreleased	
2011	Melvilasom	Capt.Vikas Roy		
2011	Collector	Avinash Varma IAS		
2011	Ven Shankhu Pol	Nandan		
2012	The King & The Commissioner	Bharath Chandran IPS		
2013	Geethaanjali	Nakulan	Cameo appearance	
2014	Salaam Kashmier	Lt. Colonel Tommy Eapen Devassy		
2014	The Samsthanam		Dropped Film	
2014	Apothecary	Dr. Vijay Nambiar		
2014	The Dolphins	Panayamuttam Sura		
2015	Compartment	Himself	Guest appearance	
2015	Chamante Kabani	CBI Officer	Cameo appearance	
2015	Rudra Simhasanam	Rudra Simhan		
2015	My God	Aadhiraja Bhattathiri		
2020	Varane Avashyamund	Major Unnikrishnan		
2021	Adbhutham	Samuel	Censorod in 2005 Release in 2021 Direct OTT release in Amazon Prime Video	
2021	Kaaval	Thambaan		
2022	Paappan	CI Abraham Mathew Mathan (Paappan)		
2022	Mei Hoom Moosa	Lance Naik Muhammad Moosa		
2023	Garudan	DCP Harish Madhav IPS		
2025	JSK: Janaki V v/s State of Kerala	David Abel Donovan and Daniel Abel Donovan		
2027	Ottakkomban †	Kaduvakkunnel Kuruvachan	Post-Production	
TBA	Varaham †	TBA	Completed	
TBA	Oru Perumgaliyattam †	Peruvannan	Completed	

== Other language films ==
Key
†	Denotes films that have not yet been released

Year	Film	Role	Language	Notes
1984	Niraparaadhi	Inspector Balan	Tamil	
1988	Antima Theerpu	Suresh	Telugu	
1988	New Delhi	Suresh	Hindi	
1988	New Delhi	Suresh	Kannada	
1991	Karpoora Mullai	Himself	Tamil	Guest appearance in the song "Poongaaviyam"
2001	Dheena	Adikesavan	Tamil	
2002	Samasthanam	Surya	Tamil	
2009	Aa Okkadu	Adv. Sri Krishna	Telugu	
2015	I	Dr. Vasudevan	Tamil	
2023	Tamilarasan	Dr. Muruganantham	Tamil	

== As a playback singer ==
Year	Film	Song(s)	Co-singer(s)	Lyricist	Music director
1998	Pranayavarnangal	Oru Kulappoo Pole	Solo	Sachithanandan Puzhankara	Vidyasagar
2000	Pilots	Doore Pooppamparam	Dr Sam, Chorus	Gireesh Puthenchery	MG Radhakrishnan
2000	Sathyameva Jayathe	Ambilipooppennium	Solo	Kaithapram	M Jayachandran
2002	Janmangalaay	Ponninchellulla		Sunny Viswanath, Jayasree Krish	Sunny Viswanath
2003	Shabby Baby Sharon Baby	Thillaana Thillaana	Alex Kayyalaykkal	Gireesh Puthenchery	Thankaraj
2009	The Stars	Manajaniyum Margazhiyil	Mamta Mohandas		K A Latheef
2009	Kannimala Swami	Saranamanthram Padum, Neyyabhishekam	Solo	Thankan Thiruvattoor	Perumbavoor G Raveendranath
2010	Kanyakumari Express	Chilamboliyude Kalaapam, Evide Evide	Solo	Vayalar Sarathchandra Varmma	Sharath
2010	Je Aime Tu	Manjin Pookkalil, Kathil Thenkanam	Solo	Rafeeq Ahammed	Sharath
2013	One Love	Mazhavil Niramezhum	Solo	Gemini Unnikrishnan	Gemini Unnikrishnan
2014	Idavazhiyile Eenam	Oru Sandhyayil	Radhika Suresh G	Madhavi Menon	Kallara Gopan
2014	Irumkulagara Amma	Amme Ninnude	Solo		MG Radhakrishnan
2016	Manjupookalil	Love song (Flowers TV)	Solo		

== Television ==
Year	Title	Credited as	Channel	Notes
1995	Greenlandil Oru Puthuvarsham	Actor	Doordarshan	Telefilm
2001	Indraneelam	Producer	Doordarshan	TV Serial
2000	Appoppanthadi	Himself	Doordarshan	TV Serial
2010	Idea Star - Season 4	Celebrity Judge	Asianet	
2010	Munch Star Singer Junior	Celebrity Judge	Asianet	
2011	Nammal Thammil	Guest	Asianet	
2012	Ningalkkum Aakaam Kodeeshwaran	Host	Asianet	
2013	Ningalkkum Aakaam Kodeeshwaran	Host	Asianet	
2014-2015	Ningalkkum Aakaam Kodeeshwaran	Host	Asianet	
2014	Indian Voice Junior	Celebrity Judge	Mazhavil Manorama	
2014	Cinema Chirima	Guest	Mazhavil Manorama	
2014	Shoot N Show	Himself	Kairali TV	
2014	Big Screen	Himself	Kairali TV	
2014	JB Junction	Himself	Kairali TV	Video Presence in Jalaja's episode
2016	Manjupookalil	Singer	Flowers	Music Album
2016	D4 Dance	Celebrity Judge	Mazhavil Manorama	
2017	Adi Mone Buzzer	Guest	Asianet	
2017	Ningalkkum Aakaam Kodeeshwaran	Host	Asianet	
2017	Udan Panam	Himself	Mazhavil Manorama	
2019	Padam Namuk Paadam	Himself	Mazhavil Manorama	
2019-2020	Ningalkkum Aakaam Kodeeshwaran	Host	Mazhavil Manorama	
2020	Health Desk	Host	Asianet	
2021	Anjinodu Injodinju	Host	Surya TV	
2021	Engeyum Eppozhum SPB	Singer	Mazhavil Manorama	
2021	Comedy Mamankam	Host	Asianet	
