= Shaji Kailas =

Indian film director (born 1965)

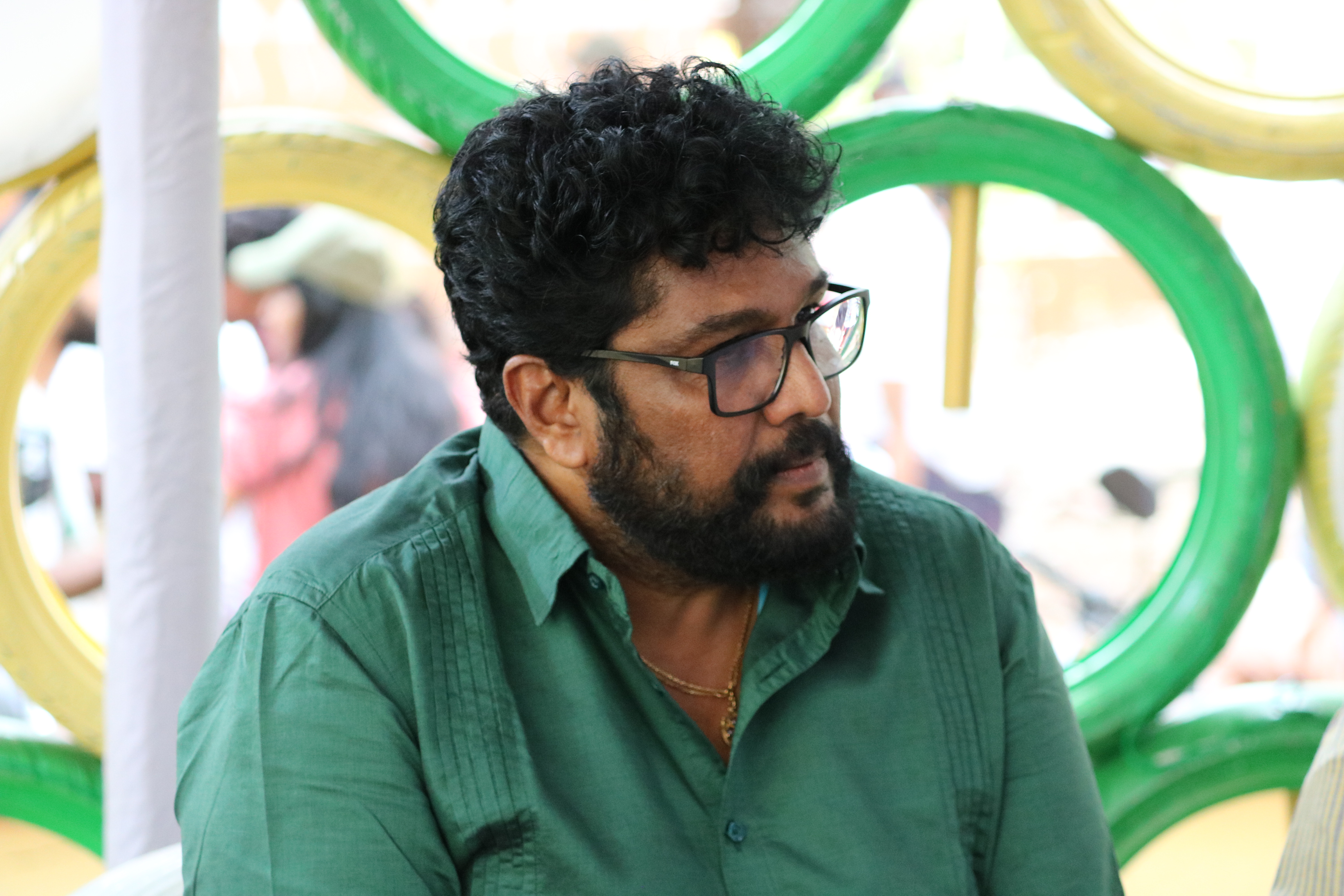
- Shaji in 2022
- Born: 8 February 1965 (age 61); Trivandrum, Kerala, India
- Occupations: Director; screenwriter; film producer
- Years active: 1989–present
- Spouse: Annie (m. 1996)
- Children: 3

Shaji Kailas (born 8 February 1965) is an Indian film director and screenwriter known for his works in Malayalam cinema. Kailas got a breakthrough with the comedy film Dr. Pasupathy (1990).

He is best known for his action films with mainly focusing on political thriller and crime genres such as Thalastaanam (1992), Sthalathe Pradhana Payyans (1993), Ekalavyan (1993), Mafia (1993), Commissioner (1994), The King (1995), Aaraam Thampuran (1997), Narasimham (2000), Valliettan (2000), Kaduva and Kaapa (2022).

== Early and personal life ==
Shaji Kailas was born to Shivaraman Nair who was an executive engineer in the Kerala Public Works Department and Janakiyamma on 8 February 1965.

He is married to former actress Annie. They currently reside at Thiruvananthapuram, Kerala, India and have three sons Jaganathan, Sharon, and Rushin.

== Career ==
=== 1984–1991: Early career ===
Shaji Kailas started his film career as assistant director under renowned writer director Balu Kiriyath in 1984. Shaji Kailas' debut as a director was in 1989 with The News, starring Suresh Gopi in the lead role. Scripted by Jagadish, this investigative thriller was a hit at the box office. With the film, Kailas succeeded in gaining attention of film viewers. But his second release Sunday 7 PM, came out in 1990 was a failure. Later in the same year, he directed Dr. Pasupathy, a political satire, with Innocent in a leading role. Dr. Pashupathi, written by Renji Panicker, ended up as one of the biggest grosser of the year. This film also marked the beginning of Shaji Kailas- Renji Panicker combo, which later went into making of several super hits. But, the success of Dr. Pashupathy was followed by Souhrudam, a romantic comedy starring Mukesh and Sai Kumar in the leading roles. His next film, Kilukkampetti, with Jayaram in the lead role was hit. After this in 1992 he switched to action films with the blockbuster Thalastaanam, which would go on to become his trademark genre.

=== 1992–2000: Breakthrough ===
In the year 1992 Shaji Kailas got his first real career break. His association with Renji Panicker brought out Thalastaanam, with Suresh Gopi in the leading role. Revolved around student politics, Thalastaanam also marked the rebirth of Renji Panicker as a scriptwriter. This film also marked Suresh Gopi's first step to super stardom. The cinematography of the film was done by Ravi K. Chandran. This film also saw the rise of Narendra Prasad, who later became one of the most acclaimed villains in the Malayalam industry. In the same year Shaji Kailas tried out a comedy flick, Neelakurukkan, which was above average grosser. But in the beginning of 1993 Shaji Kailas landed up again with another blockbuster, Sthalathe Pradhana Payyans. In the same year, Ekalavyan completed a run of 150 days in the theatres & played a crucial role in elevating lead actor Suresh Gopi to superstardom. Again in the same year, the Shaji Kailas-Renji Panicker-Suresh Gopi team returned with Mafia, a gangster film completely shot in Bangalore. It was still known for its well-choreographed action sequences that pitted against an upcoming crime boss Ravishankar portrayed by Suresh Gopi against the ever-threatening Gowda brothers portrayed by Tiger Prabhakar and Babu Antony.

In 1994 Commissioner, (again with Suresh Gopi in title role) broke several box office records and went on to become the second highest-grossing film of the year. In 1995, he collaborated with Mammootty for the first time in The King which was the highest grossing Malayalam film of the year. A turning point in his career, the success of the film made him one of the most commercially successful and sought after directors in Malayalam film industry. In the next year, in 1997 Shaji Kailas again joined with Ranjith for a low-budget action film titled Asuravamsam, with Manoj K. Jayan, Siddique and Biju Menon in leading roles. This film was criticized by many for its gory violence. He also done some cinematography for action sequences of the film. Asuravamsam was also an average grosser. In the same year, he again joined with Ranjith to make Aaram Thamburan, a turning point in his film career. In this film, he joined with Mohanlal for the first time. This film was the highest-grossing Malayalam film at the time and was able to complete 250 days in theatres. Then came The Truth, in 1998, with Mammooty in the lead role. It was an investigative thriller. In 1999, he directed F. I. R, another action flick with his friend Suresh Gopi as the lead actor scripted by Dennis Joseph. F. I. R emerged one of the top grossers of the year.

=== 2000–2012: Commercial stardom, decline and hiatus ===
In 2000, he directed two films. Narasimham, released in the first weeks of the year, with Mohanlal in the lead came Thandavam, though evoked one of the biggest initial pulls in the history of Malayalam cinema, Thandavam failed at the box office. He took a break for one year. It was at this time, Kailas again tried out his luck in Tamil with Jana in (2004).

In the year 2004 Shaji Kailas made a comeback in Malayalam with Natturajavu. With Mohanlal in lead role and, scripted by T. A. Shahid, Natturajavu was a commercial success Chinthamani Kolacase, a vigilante action thriller with Suresh Gopi in leading role and Baba Kalyani with Mohanlal released. Both were hits at the box office. However, his first film with Dileep, The Don, turned into a huge flop in 2006. The next film, But things again got lost in the same year itself. His first film with Dileep, The Don, turned into a huge flop. The next film Baba Kalyani, starring Mohanlal, was an average hit. But then came a series of flops. Time (2007), Alibhai (2007), Sound of Boot (2008), all bombed. Alibhai, was a big budget film with all leading stars in a row appeasing, but still bombed at box office. Even hard core Mohanlal fans couldn't digest the film. Then came Red Chilliess in 2009, it was a moderate success at box-office. In January 2010, Shaji Kailas directed Drona 2010, which received mixed reviews. Beginning of 2011 showcased his attempt to reclaim his position within Malayalam industry with the sequel of yesteryear mega hit August 1, August 15 which garnered heavy negative reviews from critics and audiences alike and was finally declared as another flop by Shaji Kailas. His next movie was with Mammotty and Suresh Gopi named The King and the Commissioner the movie was the next part of the yesteryear films The King and Commissioner. This movie was a hit in the box office but this movie also received a good amount of positive reviews from both the critic and the audiences.

=== 2022: Resurgence ===
On 16 October 2019, it was announced that Shaji Kailas would be marking his re-entry in films after his hiatus with Kaduva, starring Prithviraj Sukumaran and Vivek Oberoi in the lead roles. Kaduva was released on 7 July 2022 to mixed-to-positive reviews from the critics. The film grossed around ₹50 crores and became a commercial success. He again directed Prithviraj for the third time in Kaapa, the same year, co-starring Asif Ali in the lead role. Upon release, Kaapa received mixed reviews from the critics and became an average grosser. His next directorial, Alone (2023), starring Mohanlal, was released to mixed reviews and turned out to be a box-office failure.

== Filmography ==
=== Director ===
Key
†	Denotes films that have not yet been released

Year	Title	Language	Notes
1989	The News	Malayalam	Also story writer
1990	Sunday 7 PM	Malayalam	
1990	Dr. Pasupathy	Malayalam	
1991	Souhrudam	Malayalam	
1991	Kilukkampetti	Malayalam	Also story writer
1992	Thalasthanam	Malayalam	
1992	Neelakurukkan	Malayalam	
1993	Sthalathe Pradhana Payyans	Malayalam	
1993	Ekalavyan	Malayalam	
1993	Mafia	Malayalam	
1994	Commissioner	Malayalam	
1994	Rudraksham	Malayalam	
1995	The King	Malayalam	
1996	Mahathma	Malayalam	
1997	Asuravamsam	Malayalam	
1997	Aaram Thamburan	Malayalam	
1998	The Truth	Malayalam	
1999	F.I.R	Malayalam	
2000	Narasimham	Malayalam	
2000	Valliettan	Malayalam	
2001	Vaanchinathan	Tamil	
2002	Shivam	Malayalam	
2002	Thandavam	Malayalam	
2003	Vishnu	Telugu	
2004	Jana	Tamil	
2004	Natturajavu	Malayalam	
2005	The Tiger	Malayalam	
2006	Chinthamani Kolacase	Malayalam	
2006	The Don	Malayalam	
2006	Baba Kalyani	Malayalam	
2007	Time	Malayalam	
2007	Alibhai	Malayalam	
2008	Sound of Boot	Malayalam	
2008	Ellam Avan Seyal	Tamil	Remake of Chinthamani Kolacase
2009	Red Chillies	Malayalam	
2009	Kerala Cafe	Malayalam	Anthology film ; segment Lalitham Hiranmayam
2010	Dhrona 2010	Malayalam	
2011	August 15	Malayalam	
2012	The King and the Commissioner	Malayalam	Crossover spiritual sequel to The King (1995) and Commissioner (1994)
2012	Simhasanam	Malayalam	
2012	Madirasi	Malayalam	
2013	Ginger	Malayalam	
2015	En Vazhi Thani Vazhi	Tamil	
2017	Vaigai Express	Tamil	Remake of Nadiya Kollappetta Rathri (2007)
2022	Kaduva	Malayalam	
2022	Kaapa	Malayalam	
2023	Alone	Malayalam	
2024	Hunt	Malayalam	
2026	Varavu	Malayalam	
TBA	Pink Police †	Malayalam	

=== Other credits ===
Year	Title	Credit	Notes
1984	Onnum Mindatha Bharya	Assistant director	
1984	Thathamme Poocha Poocha	Assistant director	
1985	Naayakan	Assistant director	
1985	Pattabhishekam	Assistant director	
1986	Geetham	Assistant director	
1986	Snehamulla Simham	Assistant director	
1988	Padamudra	Associate director	
1989	News	Story writer	Also director
1991	Kilukkampetti	Story writer	Also director
1999	Ustaad	Co-producer	
2012	Simhasanam	Also director	
2019	Jananayakan	Judge	Reality TV show on Amrita TV
2019	Thakkol	Producer	

== Accolades ==
Filmfare Awards South

- 1993: Best Director Malayalam – Ekalavyan

Asianet Film Awards

- 2000: Best Director Award – Narasimham
