= Augustine (actor) =

Indian actor

- Born: 30 July 1955; Kodencheri, Kozhikkode (now in Kerala), India
- Died: 14 November 2013 (aged 58)
- Occupation: Actor
- Years active: 1986–2013
- Spouse: Hansi
- Children: Ann; Jeethu
- Parent(s): Kunnumpurath Mathew; Rosi

Kunnumpurath Mathew Augustine (30 July 1955 – 14 November 2013), known mononymously as Augustine, was an Indian actor who worked in Malayalam cinema. He acted in more than 150 films, mainly in comedy, character and negative roles. Actress Ann Augustine is his daughter.

== Personal life ==
Augustine was born on 30 July 1955 to Rosi and Mathew of the Kunnumpurath house at Kodencheri, Kozhikode. He was married to Hansamma; the couple have two daughters: Ann (actress), and Jeethu.

== Career ==
Beginning his acting career through theatre, Augustine entered the Malayalam film industry in the mid-1980s through an uncredited role, in the movie Swapnalokam, starring Sreenath, in 1983. His first credited appearance was in Gandhinagar 2nd Street in 1986; the role had been offered to him by Sreenivasan for having assisted the latter in finding a filming location for Gandhinagar 2nd Street. Augustine also appeared in such films as Commissioner, Devasuram, Ekalavyan, Aaraam Thampuran, Kazhcha and Katha Parayumpol. He produced the Malayalam film, Mizhi Randilum.

== Health and death ==
Augustine suffered a stroke in late 2009; however, he made a partial recovery and continued acting. Following a fall in a hotel room in April 2013, he underwent treatment in Pattambi. But later, he was diagnosed with liver cirrhosis and finally died of kidney failure, aged 58, on 14 November 2013 at a private hospital in Kozhikode. Kadal Kadannu Oru Maathukutty was the last film in which he appeared.

== Partial filmography ==
Year	Title	Role	Notes
1983	Swapnalokum		Uncredited role
1986	Aavanazhi	Ummer	
1986	Adiverukal	Manager	
1986	Gandhinagar 2nd Street		
1987	Naalkavala	Villager	
1987	Adimakal Udamakal	Abootty	
1987	Sreedharante Onnam Thirumurivu	Augustine	
1988	1921	Kunjithangal	
1988	Mrithunjayam	Pilla	
1991	Neelagiri	Rajappan	
1991	Inspector Balram	Ummer	
1991	Advaitham	Goonda	
1992	Mahanagaram	Thankappan	
1992	Oottyppattanam	Shinkaravelan	
1992	Rajashilpi	Gopalan	
1992	Daddy	S.I. Philip	
1992	Sadayam	Chandran	
1993	Chamayam	Pappi	
1993	Devasuram	Hydhrose	
1993	Ekalavyan	Geevarghese	
1993	Sthalathe Pradhana Payyans	Devan	
1993	Mafia	Anwar	
1993	Bhoomi Geetham	Minister Harischandra Nadar	
1994	Commissioner	Vattappara Peethambaran	
1994	Minnaram	Doctor	
1994	Rudraksham	Kunjahammad	
1995	Thumboli Kadappuram	Pashanam	
1995	Oru Abhibhashakante Case Diary	Bahuleyan	
1995	Chantha	Mammali	
1995	Boxer	Prasannan	
1995	Highway	Idiyan Sukumaran / Sughbir Hanuman Singh	
1995	Arabia	H.C. Gopal Gowda	
1995	Nirnayam	Police officer	
1995	Pai Brothers	Security Guard	
1996	King Solomon	Rubber Rajappan	
1996	Vanarasena	Vaidyar	
1996	Kireedamillaatha Raajakkanmaar	S. I. Kozhi Vasu	
1996	Rajaputhran	Aboobacker	
1996	Sulthan Hyderali	Muhamedali	
1997	Chandralekha	Ravindran Nair	
1997	Aaraam Thampuran	Bappu Thangalangady	
1997	Asuravamsam	Safari	
1997	Kannur	Saidaali	
1997	Hitler Brothers	Govindan	
1997	Kalyana Kacheri	S.I. Vargesh	
1997	Krishnagudiyil Oru Pranayakalathu	Gangadharan	
1998	The Truth	Police Officer	
1998	Oru Maravathoor Kanavu	Moitheen	
1998	Ayal Kadha Ezhuthukayanu	Roy	
1998	Chinthavishtayaya Shyamala	Chandran	
1998	Summer in Bethlehem	Appunni Nair	
1998	Kaikudunna Nilavu	Constable	
1998	Meenakshi Kalyanam	'Puli' Chacko	
1999	Aayiram Meni	Naanu	
1999	F.I.R	Kunjalavi	
1999	Thachiledathu Chundan	Kamalahasan	
1999	Ustaad	Ali Abu	
1999	Pattabhishekam	Vishnunarayanan's brother-in-law	
1999	Vasanthiyum Lakshmiyum Pinne Njaanum		
2000	Mazhanoolkanavu		
2000	Cover Story		
2000	Narasimham	Eradi	
2000	Dada Sahib	Nooruddin Kunju	
2000	Madhuranombarakattu	Jail Warden	
2000	Kochu Kochu Santhoshangal	Mathews	
2000	Valliettan	Gangadharan	
2000	Anamuttathe Angalamar	Punjapakeshan	
2001	Nariman	Joseph	
2001	Chitrathoonukal		
2001	Raavanaprabhu	Hydrose	
2001	Unnathngalil	Panikkar	
2001	Kakkakuyil	Rama Varma	
2001	Naranathu Thampuran	Somanathan	
2001	Karumadikkuttan		
2001	Korappan The Great		
2001	Randam Bhavam	Pushpangadan	
2001	Akashathile Paravakal	Govindan	
2001	Saivar Thirumeni	Kunjappu	
2002	Nandanam	Kunjiraman	
2002	Chathurangam	Appu	
2002	Swapnahalliyil Orunaal		
2002	Kaiyethum Doorath	Passenger in the Boat	
2003	Sahodaran Sahadevan	Kunjananthan	
2003	Pattanathil Sundaran	Varghese	
2003	Sadanandante Samayam	Divakaran	
2003	Mazhanoolkkanavu		
2003	Mizhi Randilum	Bichu	
2004	Parayam		
2004	Vesham	Paulose	
2004	Greetings	Somasundaran	
2004	Kaazhcha	Suresh	
2004	Natturajavu	Morayur Bappu	
2004	Aparichithan	Cheeru	
2004	Mayilattam	Murukan	
2004	Priyam Priyankaram		
2004	Vamanapuram Bus Route	Thankappan	
2005	Boyy Friennd	Dasappan	
2005	Nerariyan CBI	Dhanapalan	
2005	Pauran	Koshy	
2005	Thaskara Veeran	Ayyappan Pillai	
2005	Chandrolsavam	Jose	
2005	Five Fingers	Kuriachan	
2005	The Campus	Simon	
2005	The Tiger	Mankunnil Satish	
2006	Pothan Vava	Kurian	
2006	Prajapathi	Rowther	
2006	The Don	Kabeer	
2006	Balram vs Tharadas	S.I Ummer	
2006	Vargam	Chandykunju	
2006	Raashtram		
2006	Avastha		
2007	Katha Parayumpol	Scariah Thomas	
2007	Nasrani	Waiter at the club	
2007	Sooryan		
2007	Arabikkatha	Varghese	
2007	Detective	Thankachan	
2007	Rock & Roll	Subramaniyam	
2007	Avan Chandiyude Makan	Kunjeriya	
2008	Thirakkatha	Chackochan	
2008	The Thrill		
2008	Gulmohar	Appuettan	
2008	SMS	Viswambaran	
2008	Magic Lamp	Vikraman	
2008	Jubilee		
2008	Positive	Joseph	
2008	Kerala Police		
2008	Parunthu	Kumaran	
2009	Kerala Cafe	Sadasivan	segment "Makal"
2009	Loud Speaker	Watchman	
2009	Sufi Paranja Katha	Putthan Adhikari	
2009	Makante Achan		
2009	Kadha, Samvidhanam Kunchakko	Kariyappi	
2009	Mithram		
2009	Madhya Venal		
2010	Penpattanam		
2010	Black Stallion	George Keechapilly	
2011	Bhakthajanangalude Sradhakku		
2011	Indian Rupee		Cameo appearance
2012	Bavuttiyude Namathil	Kunjappa Haji	
2012	Scene Onnu Nammude Veedu		
2013	Kadal Kadannu Oru Maathukutty		
2013	Rebecca Uthup Kizhakkemala	Vicar	
2013	Shutter	Prabhu	
2013	Nakhangal	Neighbour	
2014	@Andheri		Posthumously released
2021	Kaalchilambu		Posthumously released
