= Thirakalkkappuram =

- VCD cover
- Directed by: Anil Adithyan
- Written by: Vashyavachas
- Starring: Suresh Gopi; Manju Warrier
- Distributed by: Gurupavana Films
- Release date: 1998
- Country: India
- Language: Malayalam

Thirakalkkappuram is a 1998 Indian Malayalam film directed by Anil Adithyan (in his directorial debut). starring Suresh Gopi and Manju Warrier in the lead roles. It is a sequel to Chemmeen (1965)—the gap of 33 years marks the longest gap between a film and its sequel in Malayalam cinema.

Despite the songs being well received, the film was a failure.

== Plot ==
Seethamma, a motherless child, is also believed to be the centripetal force of curses since her birth. She is looked after by her mother's sister and husband (Moothar) who do not have kids themselves. Seethamma's mom is believed to have died because she eloped against the rules of the Ocean and the community. Chengan is the male protagonist, projected as a gullible young fisherman with a mother who hates his attitude. Seethamma believes that her mother Karuthamma lives in a kingdom beyond the waves. The story follows the chit-chats to superstitions and lifestyle of the fishermen community in Kerala. The plot thickens when Chengan and Seethamma fall in love. but tangles when superstitions direct the community against the alliance. While some believe Chengan is inviting doom to his family, others condescend him as the evil eye of the community. Amidst the betrothal and confirmation of the alliance, sneers and snarls lead to a fight where Moothor calls off the marriage. After repeated attempts of trying to coax his community and Moothor to let them marry, Chengan decides to take the upper-hand and take the hand of Seethamma independently. The woman-centric plot spices-up when Seethama declares her love for Chengan in front of the community but refuses to walk out with him. Seethamma vents her anger on Chengan who decides to challenge fate, sea and his love by plunging into the ocean to make a daredevil-catch during the violent weather. Days pass while villagers fret in worry about the petty fate they weaved for Chengan and Seethamma. Although Seethamma tries to kill herself, she is seen revived by a potential groom. Chengan's oars and boat come back without Chengan; and Moothor declares his death at sea. Consecutively, the community elders suggest Moothor to accept another alliance, one for Seethamma from the man who saved her from the suicidal attempt. Seethamma silently witnesses the progress and weeps to her Mother Ocean. Some fishermen see hallucinations of Chengan while others mourn the fate. One night, Seethamma wakes up in the middle of the night and walks to the shore. She feels the waves lashing at her feet and cries. Suddenly, Seethamma sees a shadow rising out of the ocean. Within a few seconds, her crease on the lips widens into a smile and we see Chengan walking out of the sea. Chengan holds Seethamma and takes her back with him into the ocean.

== Cast ==
- Suresh Gopi as Changgan
- Manju Warrier as Sethamma
- Murali as Moothoru
- Siddique as Ramutty
- Mini Nair as Panjami
- Kuthiravattam Pappu as Kittunni
- Nedumudi Venu as Vellayudhachan
- Maniyanpilla Raju
- Ganesh Kumar
- Mala Aravindan
- Raghavan
- Meena Ganesh as Pottiyamma
- Kozhikode Sarada
- Usharani
- Kalady Omana
