= Ravi K. Chandran =

Indian cinematographer and filmmaker

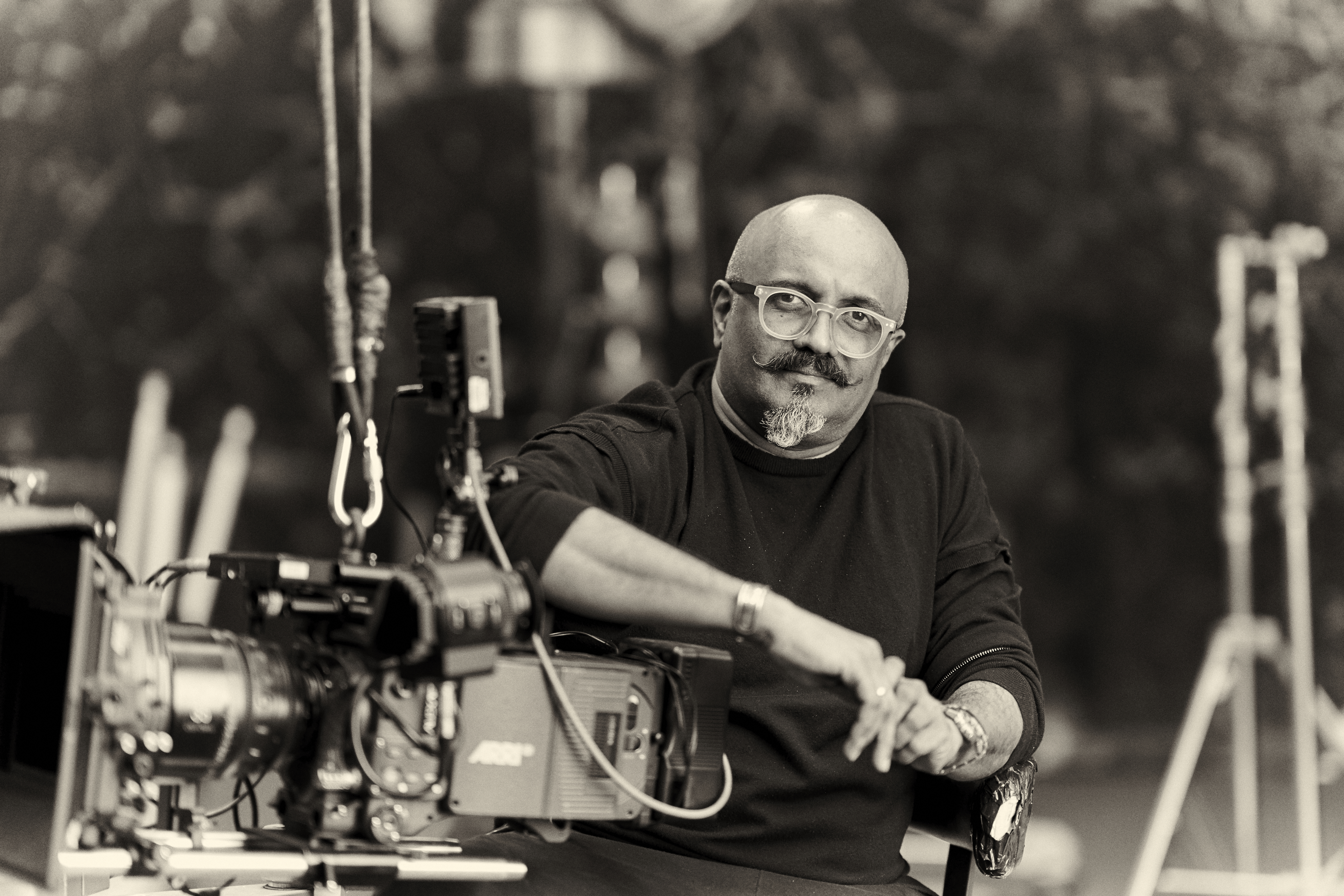
- Chandran in November 2012
- Born: 1960 (age 65–66); Maduranthakam, Chengalpattu district, Tamil Nadu, India
- Occupations: Director of Photography, Film Director
- Years active: 1992 - present
- Relatives: Ramachandra Babu (brother)

Ravi K. Chandran ISC is an Indian cinematographer and film director who predominantly works in Hindi, Malayalam, Tamil and Telugu-language cinema. His career began in 1991 with the Malayalam film Kilukkampetti. He is one of the founding members of the Indian Society of Cinematographers (ISC) and has won two Filmfare Awards and one Southern Filmfare Award.

== Early life ==
Ravi was born as the 7th child in a Malayali family to Kunjan Pillai and Padmini Amma and was brought up in Maduranthakam. His eldest brother, cinematographer Ramachandra Babu, who went to the Pune Film Institute in the seventies was the major influence and inspiration for Ravi. Growing up in the 70s, amidst the new wave of French cinema, names like Truffaut and Gordard became familiar to Ravi when he was very young. Latter part time closet painter, Ravi joined his brother as an assistant cinematographer, learning the technical aspects of the job.

== Career ==
In 1984, Ravi started his career working in Malayalam films as an assistant to his brother and cinematographer, Ramachandra Babu, and later with his friend, Rajiv Menon. He got his first break as a cinematographer in the Malayalam film Kilukkampetti and worked his way up until he shot the legendary Virasat (1997), which won many awards for Ravi. Since then there has been no looking back. He is a pioneer in using new equipment and cameras in the Indian film industry like the akila crane, kino flo lights, mole beams, hawk lenses, sky panels, celeb lights, and space lights. His work in Black (2005) was featured in an American cinematographer's magazine. Kodak international cinematographer calendar, and the cover of the ALEXA camera brochure.

His best-known works are Virasat, Dil Chahta Hai (2001), Kannathil Muthamittal (2002), Kannezhuthi Pottum Thottu, Black, Fanaa (2006), and Saawariya (2007). Ravi is also an ambassador for the Canon Cinema EOS.

Ravi's first Telugu film was with the Mahesh Babu starrer Bharat Ane Nenu. He later worked on Bheemla Nayak.

He has collaborated with director Mani Ratnam for the films like Kannathil Muthamittal, Aayutha Ezhuthu / Yuva (2004), and Thug Life (2025).

=== Directorial debut ===
Ravi's directorial debut was the 2014 Tamil film Yaan.

== Personal life ==
Ravi is the younger brother of K. Ramachandra Babu, who himself is a noted cinematographer. He is married to Hemalata and currently resides in Mumbai with his two sons. One of his sons, Santhana Krishnan, also followed his father's footsteps as a cinematographer.

== Filmography ==
=== As cinematographer ===
Year	Title	Language	Notes
1991	Kilukkampetti	Malayalam	
1992	Thalasthanam	Malayalam	
1992	Manthrikacheppu	Malayalam	
1992	Priyapetta Kukku	Malayalam	
1992	Welcome to Kodaikanal	Malayalam	
1992	Kallan Kappalil Thanne	Malayalam	
1993	Sthalathe Pradhana Payyans	Malayalam	
1993	Ekalavyan	Malayalam	
1993	Mafia	Malayalam	
1993	Arthana	Malayalam	
1993	Injakkadan Mathai & Sons	Malayalam	
1993	Customs Diary	Malayalam	
1994	Chukkan	Malayalam	
1994	Honest Raj	Tamil	Debut in Tamil cinema
1994	The City	Malayalam	
1995	Aksharam	Malayalam	
1995	The King	Malayalam	
1997	Virasat	Hindi	Filmfare Award for Best Cinematographer; Debut in Hindi cinema
1997	Minsaara Kanavu	Tamil	Co-cinematographer
1998	Kabhi Na Kabhi	Hindi	
1998	Major Saab	Hindi	
1999	Kannezhuthi Pottum Thottu	Malayalam	
2000	Snip!	Hindi	
2000	Kandukondain Kandukondain	Tamil	
2000	Raja Ko Rani Se Pyar Ho Gaya	Hindi	
2000	Citizen	Tamil	
2000	Punaradhivasam	Malayalam	
2001	Dil Chahta Hai	Hindi	Nominated - Star Screen Award for Best Cinematography
2002	Kannathil Muthamittal	Tamil	Filmfare Award for Best Cinematographer – Tamil; ITFA Best Cinematographer Award
2003	Calcutta Mail	Hindi	Nominated - Zee Cine Award for Best Cinematography
2003	Koi... Mil Gaya	Hindi	
2003	Boys	Tamil	
2004	Aayutha Ezhuthu; Yuva	Tamil; Hindi	
2005	Black	Hindi	Filmfare Award for Best Cinematographer
2005	Paheli	Hindi	
2006	Fanaa	Hindi	
2007	Saawariya	Hindi	
2008	Firaaq	Hindi	
2008	Rab Ne Bana Di Jodi	Hindi	German Public Bollywood Award for Best Cinematography
2008	Ghajini	Hindi	
2010	My Name Is Khan	Hindi	
2010	Anjaana Anjaani	Hindi	
2011	Ladies vs Ricky Bahl	Hindi	For One Song
2011	7 Aum Arivu	Tamil	
2012	Agneepath	Hindi	
2016	Baar Baar Dekho	Hindi	
2017	Ok Jaanu	Hindi	
2018	Bharat Ane Nenu	Telugu	Debut in Telugu cinema
2019	Student of the Year 2	Hindi	
2019	Adithya Varma	Tamil	
2020	Mrs. Serial Killer	Hindi	
2020	Coolie No. 1	Hindi	
2021	Bhramam	Malayalam	
2022	Bheemla Nayak	Telugu	
2025	Thug Life	Tamil	
2025	They Call Him OG	Telugu	
2026	Parasakthi	Tamil	
2026	Aadarsha Kutumbam House No: 47 - AK47	Telugu	

=== As director ===
Year	Film	Language	Notes
2014	Yaan	Tamil	Directorial debut
2021	Bhramam	Malayalam	Remake of Andhadhun

== Awards and nominations ==
Filmfare Awards/Filmfare Awards South

- 1998: Best Cinematographer - Virasat
- 2002: Best Cinematographer – Tamil - Kannathil Muthamittal
- 2006: Best Cinematographer - Black

Star Screen Awards

- 2002: Nominated, Star Screen Award for Best Cinematography - Dil Chahta Hai

Zee Cine Awards

- 2004: Nominated, Zee Cine Award for Best Cinematography - Yuva
- 2004: Nominated, Best Cinematography - Calcutta Mail

Vijay Awards

- 2011: Nominated, Vijay Award for Best Cinematography - 7 Aum Arivu
