= Hunt (2024 film) =

- Theatrical release poster
- Directed by: Shaji Kailas
- Written by: Nikhil Anand
- Produced by: K. Radhakrishnan
- Starring: Bhavana; Renji Panicker; Chandhunadh
- Cinematography: Jackson Johnson
- Edited by: Ajas Pukkadan
- Music by: Kailas Menon
- Production company: Jayalakshmi Films
- Release date: 23 August 2024
- Running time: 116 minutes
- Country: India
- Language: Malayalam

Hunt is a 2024 Indian Malayalam-language horror thriller film directed by Shaji Kailas and written by Nikhil Anand. Produced by K. Radhakrishnan under Jayalakshmi Films, it stars Bhavana, Renji Panicker and Chandhunadh.

== Plot ==
The story centers on a forensic postgraduate who stumbles upon skeletal remains identified as belonging to a missing anesthesia student from her college. As the investigation unfolds, the case becomes even more complex when the missing student's former lover becomes entangled in the mystery. As eerie and unsettling events escalate, Dr. Keerthi must navigate through a web of deception and danger. The investigation challenges her to unravel the truth while confronting the deepening shadows of her own fears. Will she uncover the dark secrets behind the remains, or will the escalating tension lead her into a darker abyss?

== Cast ==
- Bhavana as Dr. Keerthy
- Aditi Ravi as Dr. Sara Eeppan
- Chandhunadh as Dr. Shanavas
- Dain Davis as Dr. Kuncheria
- Anu Mohan as Dr. Aravind
- Ajmal Ameer as ASP Sairam IPS
- Renji Panicker as Padmanabhan Ramaswany
- Sonu Anna Jacob as Dr. Kanmani
- Rahul Madhav as Akbar Ahmed
- Biju Pappan as SI Syamlal
- G. Suresh Kumar as Dr. Narayanacharya Potti
- Nandu as CI Sathyan
- Vijayakumar as City Police Commissioner Antony IPS
- Kottayam Ramesh as Home Minister Mullackal Sasheendran
- Divya Nair as Rebecca
- Kollam Thulasi as Health Minister Thomas Luca
- Padmaraj Ratheesh as Dr. Shaji

== Production ==
The film was announced in December 2022. It marks the second collaboration between Kailas and Bhavana after Chinthamani Kolacase (2006). Principal photography commenced by December 2022. The film was mainly shot in Palakkad before wrapping in February 2023.

== Release ==
The teaser was released on 6 April 2023, followed by the trailer on 3 September 2023. The film was originally scheduled for a theatrical release on 9 August 2024. However, the release date was postponed to 23 August 2024.

The move was released on manoramaMAX OTT on 23 May 2025.

== Reception ==
Rohit Panikker of Times Now gave the film 2 1/2 stars out of 5 stars. Gayathri Krishna of OTTplay rated the film three out of five stars. Athira M of The Hindu reviewed the film.
