= Usharani =

Indian actress (1958–2020)

- Born: 29 May 1958; Varkala
- Died: 20 June 2020 (aged 62)
- Occupation: Film actor
- Years active: 1967–2000
- Spouse: N. Sankaran Nair (1977-2005)
- Children: Vishnu Sankar
- Parent(s): Krishna Rao Iyengar, Sudeshini

Usharani (29 May 1958 – 20 June 2020) was an Indian actress who acted mainly in Malayalam films.

== Personal life ==
Usharani married Malayalam movie director N. Sankaran Nair in 1977.

== Filmography ==
=== Malayalam ===
- Jail (1966) (Child artist)
- Poochakkanni (1966) (Child artist)
- Ollathu Mathi (1967)
- Chithramela (1967)
- Balyakalasakhi (1967) (Child artist)
- Agniputhri (1967) as Bindhu (Child artist)
- Manaswini (1968) as Sumangala
- Karthika (1968) as Jaanu (Child artist)
- Ballaatha Pahayan (1969) as Sulekha
- Ammayenna Sthree (1970) as Malathy
- Naazhikakkallu (1970) as Vidhya
- Anaadha Shilpangal (1971) as Ammini
- Prathidhwani (1971)
- Thottavadi (1973) as Sarasamma
- Thaniniram (1973) as Vasanthy
- Vrindaavanam (1974)
- Ankathattu (1974)
- Honeymoon (1974)
- Maanyashree Vishwaamithran (1974) as Lathika
- Bhaarya Illaatha Raathri (1975)
- Chumaduthaangi (1975) as Sugandhi
- Aaranyakaandam (1975)
- Akkaldaama (1975)
- Sathyathinte Nizhalil (1975)
- Panchami (1976) as Rukku
- Abhinandanam (1976) as Vimala
- Surveykkallu (1976)
- Anaavaranam (1976)
- Ayalkkaari (1976) as Elizabeth
- Theruvugeetham (1977)
- Rowdy Rajamma (1977)
- Bhaaryaavijayam (1977)
- Dheera Sameere Yamuna Theere (1977)
- Harshabhaashpam (1977) as Kochukalyani
- Muttathe Mulla (1977) as Radha
- Nirakudam (1977) as Anarkali
- Randu Lokam (1977)
- Makampiranna Manka (1977)
- Prarthana (1978)
- Padmatheertham (1978) as Jameela
- Avalude Ravukal (1978) as Radha
- Mudramothiram (1978) as Bindu
- Madanolsavam (1978)
- Kaivarikal Thiriyumbol (1979)
- Ee Yugam (1983) as Ammu
- Cabaret Dancer (1986)
- Theruvu Narthaki (1988)
- Kuruppinte Kanakku Pusthakam (1990) as Beena's sister
- Agninilavu (1991) as Arya
- Maarathon (Aayaraam Gayaaraam) (1992)
- Kallanum Polisum (1992) as Dakshayaniyamma
- Aham (1992) as Achamma Tharakan
- Thalastaanam (1992) as Unni's aunt
- Ellarum Chollanu (1992) as Archana's mother
- Padaleeputhram (1993)
- Ithu Manjukalam (1993) as Mrs. Anna George
- Ekalavyan (1993) as Mathaji
- Butterflies (1993)
- Kavadiyattam (1993) as Kurup's mother
- Oru Kadankatha Pole (1993) as Alamelu
- Sthalathe Pradhana Payyans (1993) as Kurup's wife
- Ammayane Sathyam (1993) as Jagannatha Varma's wife
- Pravachakan (1994) as Kurian's wife
- Bhaarya (1994) as Sarojini
- Manathe Kottaram (1994) as Kanakam
- Rajadhani (1994) as Maniyamma
- Sudhinam (1994) as Teacher
- Paalayam (1994) as Mariyamma
- Mangala Soothram (1995) as Adv. Maheswariyamma
- Manashasthranjante Diary (1995)
- Boxer (1995)
- Indian Military Intelligence (1995) as Mappasu Mariyamma
- Mazhayethum Munpe (1995) as Fake Mummy
- Vaanarasena (1996) as Vishalakshi
- Kanchanam (1996) as Muthassi
- Hitler (1996) as Malathi Teacher
- Mahathma (1996) as Nancy's mother
- Manthrikakuthira (1996) as Rahel
- Swarnakireedam (1996) as Devayani
- Shibiram (1997)
- Poonilamazha (1997)
- Ancharakkalyaanam (1997) as Devakiyamma
- Sisiram (1998)
- Oro Viliyum Kathorthu (1998) as Janaki
- Samaantharangal (1998) as Mary
- Kanmadam (1998) as Raakkamma
- Thirakalkkappuram (1998)
- Amma Ammaayiyamma (1998) as Dhakshayani
- Pathram (1999) as Authakutty's wife
- Highrange (2000)
- Nishaasurabhikal (2000)
- Millenium Stars (2000)
- Thenkasipattanam (2000) as Sangeetha's aunty
- Premaagni (2001) as Renuka Thampuratti
- Niramulla Swapnangal (2002)
- Varum Varunnu Vannu (2003)
- The King Maker Leader (2003) as Bharathiyamma
- Mayilattam (2004) as Lakshmiyamma

=== Tamil ===
- Thirumalai Thenkumari (1970)
- Kalam Vellum (1970) as Dhanam
- Muhammad bin Tughluq (1971)
- Jakkamma (1972) as Valli
- Shakthi Leelai (1972) as Saraswathi
- Pattikaattu Ponnaiya (1973) as Kaveri
- Arangetram (1973)
- Gumasthavin Magal (1974) as Vimala
- Kanmani Raja (1974) as Kanchana
- Unnai Suttrum Ulagam (1977) as Rekha
- Odi Vilayadu Thatha (1977) as Savitri
- Ennai Pol Oruvan (1978) as Sundaramoorthy's sister
- Puthiya Vaarpugal (1979) as Social activist
- Neram Vandhachu (1982)
- Sivantha Kangal (1982)
- Mullillatha Roja (1982)
- Naalu Perukku Nandri (1983)
- Oru Oorla Oru Rajakumari (1995)
- Valli Vara Pora (1995)
- Mannava (1997) as Praveen's mother
- Harikrishnans (1998)
- Raajjiyam (2002) as Janaki's mother

=== Telugu ===
- Aalu Magalu (1977) as Radha
- Nija Roopalu (1974)
- Bullet Bullodu (1972)
- Chitti Thalli (1972)

== TV career ==
- Swantham Sujatha - (Surya TV) - Malayalam serial - Actress
- Parvathy (Raadan TV) - Malayalam serial - Actress
- Ente Mannu - Malayalam serial - Actress
- Rani Maharani
- Comedy Stars
- Manam Thurannu
- Sarigama
- Katha Ithuvare
- Asianet News
- On Record
- Njan Ivideyundu
- Samagamam
- Filmy Fridays - Online
- Paragon Chappals
