= Renji Panicker =

Indian film actor, director and scriptwriter

- Born: 23 September 1960 (age 66); Nedumudi, Kerala, India
- Other name: Renji
- Occupations: Film director; screenwriter; singer; lyricist; actor; film producer; poet; journalist
- Years active: 1990–present
- Spouse: Aneeta Marium Thomas
- Children: 2

Renji Panicker (born 23 September 1960) is an Indian actor, screenwriter, director, film producer, and journalist known for his works in Malayalam films. He made his debut as a director with Bharatchandran IPS in 2005.

== Early life ==
He completed a Bachelor of Commerce from SD College and a certificate in Journalism from Press Club, Thiruvananthapuram. He received a Master of Journalism from University of Kerala.

== Career ==
Panicker began his career as a journalist. He started off as a reporter for magazines and publications. During an interview, while working for Chithrabhumi, a film magazine, he met director Shaji Kailas. Panicker scripted several films for Shaji Kailas, including Dr. Pasupathy (1990), Thalastaanam (1992), Sthalathe Pradhana Payyans (1993), Ekalavyan (1993), Mafia (1993), Commissioner (1994), and The King (1995). The Renji Panicker-Shaji Kailas team elevated Suresh Gopi into a bankable lead actor during the early 1990s. He is known for his collaboration with director Joshiy, which included the films Lelam (1997) and Pathram (1999). He became a film director and directed two films. He is one of the managing directors of the Malayalam newspaper Metrovaartha.

Panicker has taken several cameo roles in his own films. However, he gained popularity as an actor for his role in Ohm Shanthi Oshaana (2014). He acted in Njaan (2014), Premam (2015), Jacobinte Swargarajyam (2016), Thoppil Joppan (2016), Alamara (2017), Godha (2017) and Bhayanakam (2018).

== Personal life ==
Renji Panicker was married to Aneeta Mariam Thomas, his classmate at Kerala University. Aneeta died on 10 March 2019, suffering from a kidney ailment. They have twin sons, Nithin and Nikhil, and were living in Alappuzha before moving to Kochi.

== Film career ==
While interviewing director Shaji Kailas, for a film magazine in 1990, he was impressed by Panicker's language and asked him to do a script for him. Panicker, who was an active politician since his college days tried out a political satire, Dr. Pasupathy, that turned out to be a hit. But the success of his debut film failed to bring recognition. His next venture Akashakottayile Sulthan, in 1991, directed by Jayaraj, with Sreenivasan in the main role, bombed. This made Panicker to rethink film as a career. Upon Kailas' insistence, Panicker made another attempt in 1992. Thalastaanam, revolving around campus politics was a hit and marked the beginning of the Shaji-Renji combination.

In the year 1993, Panicker penned Sthalathe Pradhana Payyans. Directed by Kailas, this film was a turning point in the life of Jagadish, who was until then slotted into comic roles. Jagadish played the role of a common man who overnight becomes the home minister of the state. Sthalathe Pradhana Payyans completed 150 days in theatres, establishing Renji Panicker as one of the leading script writers in Malayalam cinema. Next was Ekalavyan, released in May 1993. Directed by Kailas, Ekalavyan was an action thriller revolving around the unholy nexus of drug mafia-godmen and politicians. Appearing in the lead role of a police officer, Suresh Gopi established himself as the next star of Malayalam cinema. Ekalavyan completed 150 days in most theatres. Mafia then revolved around Bangalore underworld. Directed by Kailas with Suresh as hero, it was released in 1993, making Panicker the most expensive script-writer in Malayalam film.

In 1994, Kailas and Panicker created Commissioner, a police film, which completed a run of 200 days in theatres. Suresh Gopi appeared in the title role and the film became the biggest grosser of the year. Shaji-Renji rejoined in 1995, casting Mammootty as the hero of The King, which was released in the end of 1995 was successful. Thereafter the duo parted ways.

Panicker, after a long time wrote a script for director Joshiy in 1997. Lelam, another action thriller with Suresh Gopi as the hero was again a hit. The same team brought out Pathram the next year. Revolving around print media and the politics surrounding it, this flick is best remembered for dialog. The continuous run of hits came to an end in 2001. Panicker's combination with Joshiy, Dubai bombed. This was followed by Praja, the first time Mohanlal appeared in a Panicker film. The back to back set backs forced Panicker to take a break for three years. In 2005, he followed with Bharatchandran IPS the sequel of Commissioner, released in 1994. Bharatchandran IPS was his directorial debut. He also co-produced this film. This film crossed 100-day run in all major centres and gave a rebirth to Suresh. Panicker's second directorial attempt was Roudram, released in 2008, with Mammootty in the main role, Another police story, this film was a box-office success. Panicker's next project was The King & the Commissioner in which Mammootty and Suresh Gopi played the lead roles, Joseph Alex I.A.S. and Bharathchandran I.P.S., taken from the films The King and Commissioner. It was directed by Kailas. This film had many expectations, as Mammootty and Suresh were reuniting after many years as were Kailas and Panicker.

=== Plots and style ===
Renji Panicker's dialogue in Lelam is based on a real-life character while the jingoistic and valorised protagonists in Commissioner (1994) and The King (1995) are considered timeless classics for Malayalam cinema.

== Filmography ==
Key
†	Denotes films that have not yet been released

=== As actor ===
Year	Title	Role	Notes
1992	Thalastaanam	Politician	
1993	Sthalathe Pradhana Payyans	Politician	
1993	Ekalavyan	Airport passenger	
1993	Mafia	Excise / Home Minister Venkidappa	
1994	Commissioner	Journalist	
2014	Pakida	Nandakumar	
2014	Ohm Shanthi Oshaana	Dr. Mathew Devasya	
2014	Money Ratnam	Isaac	
2014	Munnariyippu	Mohan Das	
2014	Njaan	Kuttysankaran	
2014	Cousins	Doctor	Cameo appearance
2015	Picket 43	C.O Vinay Chandran	
2015	Aadu	Thomas Paappan / Varkey Pappan	
2015	Ennum Eppozhum	CEO of GM Builders	
2015	Ayal Njanalla	K.P.K. Menon	
2015	Haram	Isha's Father	
2015	Loham	Albert Alex	
2015	Premam	David Kalapparambath	Cameo appearance
2015	Acha Dhin	Home Minister Thomas Chacko	
2015	Njan Samvidhanam Cheyyum	Jury committee member	
2015	Jamna Pyari	Sridharan	
2015	Rajamma @ Yahoo	Mayor Abraham Pothen	
2015	Punchirikku Parasparam	Person reading newspaper	Short film
2015	Anarkali	Pappan	
2015	Charlie	Panicker Doctor	Guest appearance
2016	Pavada	Paul Scaria	
2016	Jacobinte Swargarajyam	Jacob	
2016	Valleem Thetti Pulleem Thetti	Madhavan	
2016	Pa Va	Thampuran Johnny	
2016	Mohavalayam		
2016	Angane Thanne Nethave Anchettannam Pinnale	Zachariya	
2016	Welcome to Central Jail	Sureshnath	
2016	Oru Muthassi Gadha	Dr. Mathew / Mathai	
2016	Oppam	Padmakumar P, IPS officer	
2016	Thoppil Joppan	Fr. James Anakattil	
2016	Aanandam	Diya's father	Cameo appearance
2016	Campus Diary	Koya Saahib	
2016	Ore Mukham	Prakashan	
2017	Georgettan's Pooram	Fr. Mathews Vadakkan	
2017	Kadamkatha	Sreekumar	
2017	Samarpanam		
2017	Gemini	Dr. Gokul	
2017	Alamara	Pavithran	
2017	1971: Beyond Borders	Janardanan	
2017	Sakhavu	Kuriyachan	Cameo appearance
2017	Godha	Captain	
2017	Clint	Writer V K Nambiar	
2017	Puthan Panam	Iqbal Rowther	Cameo appearance
2017	Ramaleela	V. G. Madhavan	
2017	Viswasapoorvam Mansoor	Kalathil Haji	
2017	Oru Cinemakkaran	Fr. Mathew	
2017	Role Models	Gautham's father	
2017	Villain	Commissioner Sreenivasan	
2017	Solo	Thomas Zachariah	Segment: World of Trilok
2017	Masterpiece	Edward Livingstone	Cameo appearance
2018	Kadha Paranja Kadha		
2018	Captain	Coach Jafer	
2018	Aami	S. K. Nair	
2018	Krishnam	Dr. Sunil	
2018	Vallikkudilile Vellakkaran	Chief Guest	
2018	Kinar		
2018	Abrahaminte Santhathikal	SP Shahul Hameed	
2018	Kuttanadan Marpappa	John's father	Photo presence
2018	Naam	Fr. James Kottayil	
2018	Bhayanakam	Postman	
2018	Drama	Kunjachan	
2018	Ente Ummante Peru	Mohammed Hydarali Mehfil	Photo appearance and voiceover
2019	Vijay Superum Pournamiyum	Venugopal	
2019	Kodathi Samaksham Balan Vakeel	DGP K. E. Eappan	
2019	Margamkali	Urmila's father	
2019	Sakalakalashala		
2019	Thelivu	Ramesh Kumar	
2019	Roudram 2018	Narayanan	
2019	Kalikoottukkar		
2019	Pengalila	Koshy Mathew	
2019	Athiran	Jayanarayana Varma	
2019	Oru Yamandan Premakadha	Advocate John Kombanayil	
2019	Ningal Camera Nireekshanathinlannu		
2019	Aniyan Kunjinum Thannalayathu		
2019	Mohabbathin Kunjabdulla	Thangal	
2019	Sachin	Ramachandran	
2019	Love Action Drama	Swathi's father	
2019	Ulta		
2019	Thakkol	Clement	
2020	Kalamandalam Hyderali	Kalamandalam Hyderali	
2020	Forensic	Retd. SP Abdul Wahab IPS	
2021	Backpackers	Rawther	
2021	Muddy	Master of Hero	
2021	Kaaval	Antony	
2022	Naaradan	Govinda Menon	
2022	CBI 5: The Brain	DYSP Balagopal, C.B.I.	
2022	Kooman	CI Somasekharan	
2022	Gold	Chandrasekharan	
2023	Kolaambi	Abdul Kader	
2023	Iru		
2023	Section 306 IPC		
2023	Otta		
2023	Thaal		
2023	Bullet Diaries		
2024	Little Hearts	Johnson	
2024	DNA	DGP Martin Aloshius IPS	
2024	Secret		
2024	Hunt	Padmanabhan Ramaswany	
2024	Kadha Innuvare	Comrade Sivaprasad alias Sivettan	
2024	Soul Stories		
2025	Ennu Swantham Punyalan	Fr. Nicholas	
2025	Sweetheart!	Manu's father	Tamil film
2025	E Valayam	Vinayan	
2025	Param Sundari	Bhargavan Nair	Hindi film
2025	The Pet Detective	Jose Alula	
2025	Dheeram		
2025	Aghosham	Bishop	
2026	Aadu 3	Thomas Paappan / Narayanan Thampuran	
2026	Hi	Daasan	Tamil film

=== Other works ===
Year	Title	Director	Writer	Notes
1990	Dr. Pasupathy		Yes	
1991	Aakasha Kottayile Sultan		Yes	
1992	Thalastaanam		Yes	
1993	Sthalathe Pradhana Payyans		Yes	
1993	Ekalavyan		Yes	
1993	Mafia		Yes	
1994	Commissioner		Yes	
1995	The King		Yes	
1997	Lelam		Yes	
1999	Pathram		Yes	
2001	Dubai		Yes	
2001	Praja		Yes	
2005	Bharatchandran IPS	Yes	Yes	
2008	Roudram	Yes	Yes	
2012	The King & the Commissioner		Yes	

=== Distribution ===
Year	Title	language	Notes
2017	Orayiram Kinakkalal	Malayalam	
2017	Adam Joan	Malayalam	
2017	Kaabil	Hindi	In Kerala
2017	Raees	Hindi	In Kerala

=== Television ===
Year	Title	Role	Channel	Notes
2017–2018	Aniyara	Host	Surya TV	
2019	Nammal Thammil 2	Host	Asianet	
2019–2020	Jananayakan	Judge	Amrita TV	
2020	Crime Patrol	Host	Kairali TV	
2020-2021	Indulekha	Ramanadha Menon	Surya TV	TV Serial
2021	Votography	Co-Host with John Brittas	Kairali TV	
2022	Naatupaksham	Host	Surya TV	
2023	Masterpeace	Chandichan	Disney+ Hotstar	Web series
2024	Manorathangal	Pathmanabhan	ZEE5	Segment: Swargam Thurakkuna Samayam
2026	Glory	Coach Panicker	Netflix	Hindi series

== Awards and nominations ==
Won

- FMB Minnale Film Award 2021– Best Actor (Male) for Kalamandalam Hyderali
- Madrid Imagineindia International Film Festival 2019 – Best Actor (Male) for Bhayanakam
- Indywood Academy Award for the Best Actor (Male) – Bhayanakam, 2018
- Kerala Film Critics Association Awards for Best Second Actor (Male) – Jacobinte Swargarajyam, 2017
- Asianet Comedy Awards for Star performer of the year – various films, 2017
- Asianet Film Awards for Best Supporting Actor – Jacobinte Swargarajyam, 2017
- South Indian International Movie Awards for Best Supporting Actor – Jacobinte Swargarajyam, 2017
- Asiavision Awards for Best Character Actor – Jacobinte Swargarajyam, 2016

Nominations

- 65th Filmfare Awards Southfor Filmfare Award for Best Supporting Actor – Malayalam- Godha, 2018
- 2nd IIFA Utsavam for Best Supporting Actor – Jacobinte Swargarajyam, 2017
- 64th Filmfare Awards South for Filmfare Award for Best Supporting Actor – Malayalam – Jacobinte Swargarajyam, 2017
- 4th South Indian International Movie Awardsfor Best Supporting Actor – Ohm Shanthi Oshaana, 2015
