= Mul Illatha Roja =

- Title card
- Directed by: K. Ramraj
- Produced by: Jothi Bharathi
- Starring: Chakravarthi; Vijayakala
- Cinematography: T. R. Natarajan
- Edited by: B. R. Ramakrishnaa
- Music by: Muraliraj
- Release date: 24 December 1982
- Country: India
- Language: Tamil

Mul Illatha Roja (transl. A rose with no thorns) is a 1982 Indian Tamil language film, directed by K. Ramraj, starring Chakravarthi and Vijayakala. The film was released on 24 December 1982.

== Cast ==
- Chakravarthi
- Vijayakala
- Delhi Ganesh
- Goundamani
- Usharani
- Kumarimuthu
- Vellai Subbaiah
- P. P. Subbaiah
- Gandhimathi

== Soundtrack ==
The soundtrack was composed by Muraliraj.

Track listing
No.	Title	Lyrics	Singer(s)	Length
1.	"Nenachu Nenachu"	K. Ramraj	P. Susheela, B. S. Sasirekha
2.	"Maaman Mummuthan"	Thangaraj	G. K. Subramaniam, Chorus
3.	"Aathoram"	Poovai Senguttavan	S. Janaki
4.	"Vasanthame Varuga"	K. Ramraj	P. Susheela, P. Jayachandran

== Critical reception ==
Thiraignani of Kalki praised the performance of Delhi Ganesh, Chakravarthy and praised Muraliraj's music but felt Usha Rajendar's performance did not stay in the mind and concluded questioning the director if you try to put a withered rose on your head, who will accept it. Balumani of Anna praised the acting of the cast, lyrics, music and direction.
