= Commissioner (film) =

- Poster
- Directed by: Shaji Kailas
- Written by: Renji Panicker
- Produced by: M. Mani
- Starring: Suresh Gopi; Ratheesh; Shobana; Vijayaraghavan; M. G. Soman
- Cinematography: Dinesh Baboo
- Edited by: L. Bhoominathan
- Music by: Rajamani
- Production company: Sunitha Productions
- Distributed by: Aroma Release
- Release date: 14 April 1994
- Running time: 175 minutes
- Country: India
- Language: Malayalam

Commissioner is a 1994 Indian Malayalam-language action thriller film directed by Shaji Kailas, written by Renji Panicker, and produced by M. Mani under Sunitha Productions. It stars Suresh Gopi, alongside Ratheesh, Shobana, Vijayaraghavan, M. G. Soman, Rajan P. Dev, K. B. Ganesh Kumar, N. F. Varghese, Karamana Janardanan Nair and Maniyanpilla Raju. The musical score was composed by Rajamani, while the cinematography and editing were handled by Dinesh Baboo and L. Bhoominathan respectively.

Commissioner became a major commercial success at the box office, with dialogues of Gopi becoming catchphrase among Malayali audience. The film was significant in making Gopi a prominent star in Malayalam cinema. The Telugu dubbed version Police Commissioner was also a major commercial success.

The sequel titled Bharath Chandran I.P.S. was released in 2005, with Renji Panicker replacing Shaji Kailas as the director. In 2012, a crossover film titled The King & the Commissioner, with the characters from The King (which was released in 1995) and Commissioner, was released in 2012.

== Plot ==
Bharathchandran, an honest and brash police commissioner of Kozhikode, bust down a gold smuggling racket at the Calicut docks and clearly has an issue with authority and breaths fire each time when he encounters a political arm bender like Kunju Moideen Sahib, whose gang was involved in the bust, but his mentor IG Balachandran evidently shields him from the wrath of the political brass.

Mohan Thomas is a Delhi-based business tycoon with a strong political clout and a clear sociopathic agenda. He had entrusted Sahib with the gold, which was confiscated by Bharathchandran. Along with gold smuggling, Mohan is also the leading kingpin of an unholy nexus of politicians, assassins and various officials, including two high ranking cops, IG Rajan Felix, Vigilance and AIG Menon, who are involved in instigating communal riots, money laundering, illegal drug trade and large scale distribution of counterfeit money. Bharathchandran and Mohan are set on a collision course when Mohan and Co. brutally murder Justice Mahendran, the chairman of the Poovanthura commission, who possess evidence that could potentially incriminate Rajan Felix and Menon for their direct involvement in communal riots at Poovanthura.

Bharathchandran is not only assigned to investigate the homicide, but also posted as the police commissioner of Thiruvananthapuram. Assisted by two dynamic and brash ASPs Prasad Menon and Mohammed Iqbal, Bharathchandran tries to solve the mystery, but soon to hit a dead-end. Bharathchandran's fiancée Indu, a lawyer, tips him off about the news clip on an assault on a drunk police constable Gopinathan, who also was coincidentally the security for Justice Mahendran. In an attempt to take Sunny, Mohan's younger brother, who had assaulted the constable within the college premises, results in a massive riot as well as a standoff with Rajan Felix, who tries to save Sunny by trying to take him into his custody, claiming previous charges. The only clue that is left with Bharathchandran and crew are based on Vattapara Pithamparan, a trade union leader who tips-off that Sunny had actually attacked Gopinath because of Gopinath's comment on counterfeit currency.

With this vital clue, Bharathchandran unearths more dirt on Mohan & Co. Bharathchandran arrests Srilatha Varma, Mohan's legal advisor and mistress, but is brutally killed in a hotel elevator by Wilfred Vincent Bastin, Mohan's henchman and a Goa-based assassin and hired killer, who had also killed Justice Mahendran. Bharathchandran is successful in nabbing Antony Ignatius Pimento, Wilfred's right-hand man, and zeroes in on Wilfred. Bharathchandran stages a coup by arresting Rajan Felix and Menon, who are brutally tortured to reveal details on their alliance with Mohan and also sheds light on their agenda. Iqbal is killed brutally in an attempt to arrest Wilfred. This enrages Bharathchandran, who later brutally kills Wilfred and Mohan at an outhouse by torching the whole house, thus taking the law into his own hands.

== Cast ==
- Suresh Gopi as City Police Commissioner Bharathchandran IPS
- Ratheesh as Mohan Thomas, Rajya Sabha MP, the main antagonist
- Vijayaraghavan as ASP Muhammad Iqbal IPS
- K. B. Ganesh Kumar as ASP Prasad IPS
- Shobhana as Adv. Indu Kurup, Bharathchandran's lover and friend
- Bheeman Raghu as Wilfred Vincent Bastin, the secondary antagonist
- M. G. Soman as IG Balachandran Nair IPS
- Rajan P. Dev as IG Rajan Felix IPS, state IB chief
- N. F. Varghese as AIG Menon IPS
- Baiju as Sunny Thomas, Mohan's brother
- Karamana Janardanan Nair as Justice Mahendran
- Chithra as Advocate Sreelatha Varma
- Ravi Vallathol as K.M. Varghese, central minister
- Ragini as Achamma Varghese
- Maniyanpilla Raju as Constable Gopinathan / Gopi
- Augustine as Vattappara Peethambaran
- Priyanka Anoop as Susheela, Gopi's wife
- Kollam Thulasi as home minister of Kerala
- Thikkurissy Sukumaran Nair as Kunjurama Kurup, Indu's grandfather
- Sathaar as Rural SP Bobby IPS
- K.P.A.C. Sunny as Kunju Moideen Sahib
- Sadiq as police officer
- Ranji Panicker as journalist
- Biju Pappan as Mohan's henchman
- T.S. Krishnan as Kunju Moideen Sahib's henchman

== Production ==
Most of the film was shot extensively in Kozhikode and its outskirts. Most scenes were shot in the same locations as that of Ekalavyan (1993).

== Release ==
Commissioner was released in April 1994 coinciding with the Vishu festivals.

== Reception ==
The film became a major commercial success at the Kerala box office. It was also dubbed into Tamil and Telugu, and both versions were box office successes. The Telugu version, Police Commissioner, the most successful among the two, ran for more than 100 days in Andhra Pradesh, which was also a success in Karnataka.

Ashish Rajadhyaksha and Paul Willemen in the book Encyclopedia of Indian Cinema write, "Suresh Gopi's performance, embodying the fascist machismo of the honest and committed police officer, made him a Malayalam superstar."

== Legacy and sequels ==
The characters Bharathchandran IPS and Mohan Thomas, portrayed by Suresh Gopi and Ratheesh, are considered iconic characters in the Malayalam film industry.

A sequel to this film, Bharathchandran I.P.S., was released in 2005, directed by Renji Panicker himself, which was also a commercial success. A crossover film titled The King & the Commissioner was released in 2012, but became a box office failure.
