= F.I.R. (1999 film) =

F.I.R
- Directed by: Shaji Kailas
- Written by: Dennis Joseph
- Produced by: M. Mani
- Starring: Suresh Gopi; Rajeev; Biju Menon; Indraja
- Cinematography: Anandakuttan
- Edited by: A. Sreekar Prasad
- Music by: Rajamani
- Production company: Sunitha Productions
- Distributed by: Aroma Release
- Release date: January 21, 1999 (India)
- Running time: 170 minutes
- Country: India
- Language: Malayalam

F.I.R is a 1999 Indian Malayalam-language action crime drama directed by Shaji Kailas, written by Dennis Joseph and produced by M. Mani. It stars Suresh Gopi, Rajeev, Biju Menon, Indraja, N. F. Varghese and Maniyan Pillai Raju. F.I.R is the first Malayalam film to introduce Machine Gun AK-47.

== Plot ==
Roy Alex, an investigative journalist writes on hawala money from the Middle East, where he meets former M.P. and business tycoon Rahim Haji as invited by Haji's driver Basheer. Haji had lost his M.P. post a year ago after a write-up by Roy Alex in a magazine. Being an expert and a previous ace trader of the flow of foreign currency reserves to Kerala, Haji states to Roy that, most of the foreign reserves are mainly concentrated along the Gulf-American belt starting from Kottayam and extending till the coastal town of Varkala. He invited Roy as a part of reviving his failed business, and to eliminate his business rival Narendra Shetty, whom he considers as responsible for destroying his business.

Roy follows a van carrying a drama troupe, which reaches a home far away as a part of a drama, where he sees the owner of the home, a businessman and Chakrapani, the drama director, having demands of black money, and he captures it. However, Chakrapani finds them and kills him with his dogs. While passing through a nearby road at the same time, Rahim Haji tries to contact Roy, but soon learns about his death, and soon leaves to see Shetty, who fatally shoots down him for trespassing through his territory. It is later seen that Basheer has betrayed Haji as he is in cahoots with Shetty. Haji's assassination comes as a serious blow to his party.

The C.M. Nair appoints Mohammed Sarkar, an IPS officer in Tripura cadre, as the SP to investigate the assassination. At the same time, the party undergoes a fast headed by MLA Kunjalavi, which results in a serious rift between the police officers and party workers. After interrogating Chakrapani and Basheer, Mohammed Sarkar manages to gather evidence against Shetty and a final confrontation occurs where Mohammed Sarkar kills Chakrapani. Shetty tries to kill Mohammed Sarkar, but his colleague CI Gurumoorthy gets killed. Enraged, Mohammed Sarkar kills Shetty and Brigadier Giridhar Baruva by destroying the warehouse.

== Cast ==
- Suresh Gopi as SP Mohammed Sarkar IPS
- Biju Menon as CI Gregory
- Rajeev as Narendra Shetty (Voiceover by Vijay Menon)
- Maniyanpilla Raju as CI Gurumoorthy
- Indraja as Laila Gafoor, Mohammed Sarkar's wife
- N. F. Varghese as Retd. IG Bhargavan Panicker IPS
- Janardhanan as V. K. Nair, Chief Minister of Kerala
- Bheeman Raghu as Chakrapani, Narendra Shetty's henchmen
- Narendra Prasad as Rahim Haji
- Sai Kumar as Lance Naik Shivaram
- K. B. Ganesh Kumar as Roy Alex
- Devan as Brigadier Giridhar Baruva (Gireesh Bhaskar Mangattuserry)
- Mohan Jose as Basheer
- Kozhikode Narayanan Nair as Thahir Sahib
- K. P. A. C. Azeez as DYSP John Varghese
- Augustine as Kunjalavi MLA
- Karamana Janardanan Nair as Fr. Paulouse
- Paravoor Ramachandran as Home Minister of Kerala
- Kumarakam Reghunath as Ramachandra Adiga
- Kunchan as Mollakka
- T. P. Madhavan as Editor Marar
- Ravi Vallathol as Judge
- Kanakalatha as Madhavi/Maria
- Rajendran as BSS Soldier
- Priyanka Anoop as Alice
- Chali Pala as Nagappa

== Production ==
The film was shot at Thiruvananthapuram and Chennai.

== Soundtrack ==
The background score was composed by C. Rajamani

== Reception ==
Sify wrote sarcastically that "There are no songs only background music. No duets and running around trees. A boring film in short".
