= The King & the Commissioner =

- Theatrical release poster
- Directed by: Shaji Kailas
- Written by: Renji Panicker
- Produced by: Anto Joseph
- Starring: Mammootty; Suresh Gopi
- Cinematography: Bharani K. Dharan; S. Saravanan; Shaji Kumar
- Edited by: Samjith Mohammed
- Music by: Rajamani
- Production company: Emperor Cinema
- Distributed by: Play House Entertainments Release
- Release date: 23 March 2012 (India)
- Running time: 190 minutes
- Country: India
- Language: Malayalam

The King & the Commissioner is a 2012 Indian Malayalam-language action thriller film written by Renji Panicker and directed by Shaji Kailas, starring Mammootty and Suresh Gopi. The film is a crossover of the films The King (1995), Commissioner (1994) and Bharathchandran I.P.S. (2005). The film was a failure at the box office.

== Plot ==
A Pakistan military group under Major Abu Jalal Rana trespasses Indian waters, targeting New Delhi. However, the plan is intercepted by Dr. Emma John of Intelligence Wing as she informs it to her senior, Dr. Sudarshan - following departmental protocol, they decide to inform the Minister about the group's trespass as the intercepted conversation mentioned the name of the PM Ghanthachalam Paramashiva Rao. Before they can inform Paramashiva Rao, they are killed by two cops, who are joined by I.G. Shankar Ramdas who is a corrupt officer. Unbeknownst to them, Ali Imran, a photojournalist, manages to take pictures of the scene onto his camera.

Meanwhile, Kishore Balakrishnan, the senior analyst at the agency, sets off to see Swami Veerabhadra Chandramoulishwar at his ashram demanding for the information he passed before. A tainted spiritual figure with deeply entrenched connections with prominent politicians in Delhi and even possessing the clout to influence the judiciary, Chandramoulishwar is the disciple of yesteryear Godman Swami Amoorthananda - who had a predominant drug cartel functioning within his ashram. However, Chandramoulishwar is able to suffocate him before pushing him into the Yamuna river. The next day, the bodies of Kishore, Dr. Sudarshan, and Dr. Emma are all found in the riverside. Since both the victims are seen in an intimate position, the police conclude that Kishore killed the two out of jealousy, and then killed himself right after by drowning himself into the river.

However, Govindankutty Menon (G.K), the Central Home Minister in charge of Internal Security, assigns Joseph Alex I.A.S. to investigate the death of Dr. Sudarshan. Paramashiva Rao accords the constitutional status of a commission of inquiry to Joseph's investigation team and reminisces the friendship he had shared with Dr. Sudarshan. As a Rajya Sabha member, Paramashiva Rao was a close friend of Joseph's late father and MP Alexander Thevallipparambil and sarcastically remarks that Joseph never visited him in that capacity. Raman Madhavan, the National Security Advisor and Chandramoulishwar are distressed about the refusal of Paramashiva Rao to sanction a colossal arms deal - termed the Romanov Proposal - as the ratification of the defence contract will ensure huge kickbacks for them.

Swami Chandramoulishwar recollects the assistance rendered by him to Paramashiva Rao to ensure the victory of his minority government during numerous floor tests and decides to eliminate Paramashiva Rao, paving the way for Raman Madhavan to ascend as the next PM - by the orchestration of a security crisis, the seasoned politicians will be compelled to give up Prime Ministerial ambitions concreting Raman's claim. Subsequently, Joseph meets the forensic analyst and ask them to give a fresh report and include the facts that they have excluded deliberately before. After seeing a mysterious man in a black leather jacket walking away from his car, Joseph gets a call from Nanda, the daughter of Minister G.K and a journalist. She shows him the picture of a cop holding a gun towards someone inside a white car.

Imran has a gut feeling that he has seen Dr. Sudarshan in that car. On the other hand, I.G. Bharathchandran IPS, who is on deputation in the Union Home Ministry is assigned to assist Joseph in the probe. Both of them are able to get Shankar arrested, but Shankar is soon killed by Rana in the premises of the Delhi High Court. Shankar had conceded to testify to the court on the conspiracy pertaining to Dr.Sudarshan's murder. After the fiasco at the court, Joseph and Bharath brief G.K about the involvement of Rana in Shankar's death and the ultimate goal of the Pakistan mercenary force is something much more pivotal as per intelligence inputs shared by the American Embassy.

Joseph is called into the PMO to tell that he is off the case now. He retorts and is able to continue with the case after convincing Paramashiva Rao. He states that if something were to happen to Paramashiva Rao, the nation would suffer huge financial loss. The expenses are what Joseph is concerned about rather than Paramashiva Rao's life. Because of this, Chandramoulishwar gets pissed off that he decides to assassinate Paramashiva Rao through Rana. In this way, Raman Madhavan will be the next PM after ensuring support from many coalition party leaders. ACP Arjun captures the PA Ashutosh coming out of Chandramoulishwar's ashram by disguising himself as the driver along with Ubaid Mustafa Meeran.

Although, Ashutosh is taken into custody. However, Pakistan army officers pretending as Delhi Police arrives and asks for Ashutosh's custody. They kills Arjun, where Ubaid manages to kill several Pakistan officers in the shootout, but Rana arrives and kills both Ubaid and Ashutosh. Enraged, Bharath storms into the ashram, but is held at gunpoint by Swami Chandramoulishwar's men. Nevertheless, Joseph appears right in time to save Bharath from getting killed, by killing one of Chandramoulishwar's men. Chandramoulishwar and Raman Madhavan, later at night, are taken into custody. When both of them are about to be taken to the location of the ISI agents.

However, the people who accompanied them are shot dead in front of the building. Minutes later, Bharath and Joseph arrive at the dilapidated cottage with a team of commandos. They manage to defeat the ISI agents, and confront Rana, where Joseph and Bharath draw their guns to shoots Rana respectively on his hand and leg. Joseph comes close to Rana and quips at him before sticking a flag pole (with the national flag on it) into his chest while chanting Bharath Mata ki Jai. After that, they lock Chandramoulishwar and Raman Madhavan in their car and Bharath places a bomb in the car. The bomb explodes, killing both Chandramoulishwar and Raman Madhavan. They head back to the PM's office, and though initially furious, Paramashiva Rao greets and congratulates them for completing the mission successfully and assigns another new mission to deal with the country's most dreaded enemy, the dirty don D.

== Cast ==
- Mammootty as Thevallipparambil Joseph Alex IAS, Government of India (on deputation) (reprising the role from The King (1995 film))
- Suresh Gopi as IG Bharathchandran IPS, Ministry of Home Affairs (on deputation) (reprising the role from Commissioner (film))
- Sai Kumar as His Holiness Swami Veerabhadra Chandramowlishwara Maharaj, a self proclaimed Godman
- Jayan Cherthala as Raman Madhavan IFS, National Security Advisor
- Rajiv Krishna as Major Abu Jalal Rana, an ISI agent
- Janardhanan as Govindan Kutty Menon (G.K.), Union Minister of Home Affairs
- Nedumudi Venu as Padma Bhushan Dr. E.K.Sudharshan, RAW Chief
- Samvrutha Sunil as Nanda, Minister G.K's Daughter
- Mohan Agashe as Ghanthachalam Paramasiva Rao, Prime Minister of India
- Biju Pappan as SP Ubaid Mustafa Beeran IPS
- Sudheer Karamana as ACP Arjun IPS
- Devan as IG Shankar Ramadas IPS, Deputy Director NID
- P. Sreekumar as Krishnan Nair, P.A to the Home Minister
- Spadikam George as DSP Koshi
- Rizabawa as Minister Kondotti Ibrahim
- Sanjjana as ASP Nitha Rathore IPS
- Becky Thomas as Emma John, RAW Cyber Analyst
- Vijay Menon as Dr. Kishore Balakrishnan, RAW Senior Analyst
- KPAC Lalitha as Joseph's mother
- M G Soman as late Rajya Sabha MP Alexander Thevallipparambil, Joseph's late father (photo presence only)
- Kunchan as Kurup
- Kishore as Ali Imran, Journalist
- Jayakrishnan as Satheesh Chandran, TV Reporter
- Augustine as Bava Haji Musthafa
- Neha Mishra as Swamiji's Secretary
- Vaigha Rose as Assistant Commissioner
- Naveen Arakkal as Deputy Commissioner
- Fathima Babu as Justice Eliyamma Pettikaran (Peechi)
- T. P. Madhavan as Dr. K.R. Mahadevan, Chief Forensic Surgeon
- Reena Basheer as Dr. Mercy Matthew, Pathologist
- Anjali Nair as PA of National Security Advisor
- Anjana Appukuttan as Journalist
- Veena S Vijayan as Journalist
- Poornima Anand as Raman Madhavan's wife

== Production ==
=== Background ===
There were two separate films before entitled The King and Commissioner, which starred Mammootty and Suresh Gopi in 1995 and 1994 respectively. These films were successful at the box office during their period. Therefore, the 2012 film The King and the Commissioner is a film based on the two films mentioned. In addition, the lead actors in two different films were joined with Renji Panicker as the scriptwriter.

The 2012 film marks Mammootty's fourth film and Suresh Gopi's tenth film. Moreover, it also marks the comeback of Shaji Kailas-Renji Panicker duo after a gap of 16 years.

The film was earlier reported to be a successor to the three films namely The King, Commissioner, and its sequel Bharathchandran I.P.S. in 1995, 1994, and 2005 respectively. However, Kailas reportedly said that the film features a new plot in a new background, wherein the lead characters in Panicker's films and his are coming together.

=== Casting ===
The project was finalized after a long period of discussion since the relationship between the two lead stars was not so warm.

In addition, Shaji Kailas and Anto Joseph had initially announced that Reema Sen will play a role in the film, second to the lead heroine Samvrutha Sunil. However, Kannada actress Sanjanaa was later signed to play this role. Moreover, veteran actor and psychiatrist Dr. Mohan Agashe debuts in Malayalam in a cameo in the film. It was Mammootty, whom Agashe had known from the time he was shooting for Dr. Babasaheb Ambedkar, who suggested his name.

=== Filming ===
The shooting began in Trivandrum on 6 June 2011. Mammootty joined the set on 13 June. After one round of shooting in Trivandrum, the shooting shifted to Kochi and then to Delhi. Some scenes were also shot in Kozhikode. It is reported that the shooting of the film was going on in Kochi, when the income tax raids at Mammootty's residence took place. Mammootty had to be present before the investigators, and the filming was delayed to a few days.

== Reception ==
=== Critical reception ===
Rediff.com rated the film 3 out of 5 stars and said, "It's high on nostalgia but The King And The Commissioner has nothing new to offer." Sify rated the film as disappointing and said, "A better script, more believable characters, some real trimming and a modern style could have done wonders for The King and The Commissioner. But in the current form it succeeds in reminding about the earlier movies, though it is painfully long at more than three hours.".
