= Sthalathe Pradhana Payyans =

- Directed by: Shaji Kailas
- Written by: Renji Panicker
- Produced by: Joemon; Ramdan Poyyeri
- Starring: Jagadish; Suresh Gopi; Geetha; Narendra Prasad; Siddique
- Cinematography: Anandakuttan
- Edited by: L.Bhoominathan
- Music by: Rajamani; Lyrics: Bichu Thirumala
- Release date: 1993
- Running time: 150 Minutes(2 Hour 30 Minutes)
- Country: India
- Language: Malayalam

Sthalathe Pradhana Payyans is 1993 Malayalam-language political thriller film directed by Shaji Kailas and written by Renji Panicker. The film revolved around the current affairs of Kerala in 90s and was a commercial success.

It severely criticized the political establishments and exposed the unholy equations of politics, whereby inviting strong opposition from different political quarters. Jagadish, who played the role of a common man, accidentally becoming the home minister of the state was well received by the audience, where the film is considered as a turning point in Jagadish's career, who was until hooked up in comedy roles. Suresh Gopi made a cameo appearance in the film.

Shooting for the film began on 7th November 1992.

== Plot ==
Lying on the suburbs of the city, the Hindustan Colony is an Indian colony, populated mainly by middle-class and lower-class people who are busy with their own day-to-day issues. The problem of drinking water has been a serious issue, which has been neglected by the ruling class for several years for their political gains. Gopalakrishnan, a resident of the colony, is an educated youth, who works as a newspaper delivery man.

Along with his group of friends, Gopalakrishnan is active in all social and cultural activities, and is in love with Gowri, the daughter of Poomukhath Kurup, a corrupt business contractor, who happens to be his uncle too. Kurup has been instrumental in the death of Gopalakrishnan's father, giving rise to their bittern enmity. The Kerala State politics is in great flux turmoil at this time with group factionalism and party infighting, where CM Govinda Menon is in all efforts to retain power, despite strong opposition from within his own party.

Kunhikannan Nambiar, a seasoned and cunning politician, is all set to take up power by usurping the CM's position. The sudden death of a minister named Marukandam Madhavan, after being forced into a swimming pool by his wife, demands a re-election, which is crucial for the ministry to survive. Kunhikanan Nambiar uses his political clout and demands the vacated seat for one of his loyalists. Govinda Menon had to reluctantly agree with Nambiar to choose the candidate for the seat under a set of conditions. Nambiar decides to field Gopalakrishnan, who enjoys a strong influence among the people, on request of the party workers from the Hindustan Colony.

Gopalakrishnan, who has no political experience, thus becomes a candidate with the support of his friends and wins the election with a stunning majority, but Nambiar doesn't ends his game with this. In the party meeting, Nambiar argues for a ministry and makes Gopalakrishnan as the state's Home Minister. With a lethal mindset and mysterious underworld connections, Nambiar wants the home ministry in his hands to ensure the easy flow of weapons through the state, but Gopalakrishnan starts performing in his own capacity, which shocks Nambiar thereby scattering his own plans. Gopalakrishnan wins the heart of Govinda Menon, where he announces a free policing system and cleansing law and order.

Mohammed Iqbal, a young and dynamic police commissioner, is assigned the task of cleaning up the city, where he arrests the goons of Nambiar, annoying him to the best. Nambiar's order to release the goons is ignored by the Minister. Nambiar also prevents the plans to ignite communal violence in the city, but he decides to start a revolt from Hindustan Colony itself. Nambiar's plan to divide the people of the Hindustan Colony into communal lines shows results, which creates minor scuffles in the peaceful colony. Subair, Gopalakrishnan's childhood friend, who is on leave from the Indian Army, tries to mediate and settle issues.

Several temples and mosques are now raided by police on special order from the Home minister, whereby several deadly weapons, including guns and bombs, are found by police. This issue creates problems in the state. Nambiar masterminds a huge communal violence in the city, mainly at Hindustan Colony. In the riots, Nambiar's goons set fire to several houses, and attacks several women, including Subair's sister. In an attempt to save her, Subair is killed. During his visit to the colony, Gopalakrishnan faces a severe protest from the people, including his dear ones, who accuse him of being a mass murderer.

Gopalakrishnan submits his resignation but Govinda Menon does not approve of his resignation, where he asks Gopalakrishnan to show his power at this moment by exposing the real culprits in front of society. Along with a mob, Gopalakrishnan raids the camp of Nambiar. The mob goes violent, attacks Nambiar and kills him along with his partners.

== Cast ==
- Jagadish as Home Minister Gopalakrishnan
- Suresh Gopi as Subair, Gopalakrishnan's Childhood Friend
- Narendra Prasad as Kunjikkannan Nambiar
- Siddique as SP Mohammed Iqbal IPS
- Suchitra as Gowri, Gopalakrishnan's Cousin and Love Interest (Voice by Bhagyalakshmi)
- Geetha as District Collector Suja Cherian IAS (Voice by Anandhavalli)
- Janardhanan as Chief Minister Govinda Menon
- Maniyanpilla Raju as Thankachan, Gopalakrishnan's Friend
- Baiju as Siyad, Gopalakrishnan's Friend and Subair's Brother
- Mammukoya as Kumaran, Gopalakrishnan's Friend
- Vijayaraghavan as MP Jayapalan, Nambiar's Aide
- Jagathy Sreekumar as "Coccus" Salim, Chief Minister's P. A
- K. B. Ganesh Kumar as Prasannan, Gouri's Brother
- Rajan P. Dev as DYSP Sadanandan, Nambiar's Aide
- Oduvil Unnikrishnan as Poomukhathu Kurup, Gopalakrishnan's Uncle and Prasannan and Gouri's Father
- Suvarna Mathew as Thankachan's Sister and Subair's Lover (Voice by Sreeja)
- Santhakumari as Saraswathi, Gopalakrishnan's Mother (Voice by Valsamma)
- Beena Antony as Radha, Gopalakrishnan's Sister (Voice by Ambily)
- Santha Devi as Kunjalumma, Subair and Siyad's Mother
- Suma Jayaram as Kousu, Subair and Siyad's Sister (Voice by Ambily)
- Usharani as Chandramathi, Kurup's Wife and Gopalakrishnan's Aunt
- Paravoor Bharathan as Food and Civil Supplies Minister
- Kozhikode Narayanan Nair as Hassan Bhai
- Augustine as Devan
- Kunchan as Police Constable
- Sadiq as Colony Neighbour
- Vettukili Prakash as Colony Neighbour
- Pavithran as Pavithran, Colony Neighbour
- Subair as Bahuleyan
- James as Imthiyas
- Krishnan Kutty Nair as Ex-Home Minister Marukandam Madhavan
- Lalithasree as Marukandam Madhavan's Wife
- Biyon as Chief Minister's Grandson
- Renji Panicker as Politician
- Vinod Kozhikode as Rajan, Nambiar's Henchman

== Reception ==
Upon release, Sthalathe Pradhan Payyans broke several records in collections and completed 150 days in major centers. This film took both Shaji Kailas and Renji Panicker to new heights. This film got released within weeks after the Ayodhya issue and Mumbai communal riots, and the similar scenes shown on screen, created a sensation in the state.
