= Thalastaanam =

Thalasthanam
- Promotional poster
- Directed by: Shaji Kailas
- Written by: Renji Panicker
- Produced by: S. Henry
- Starring: Suresh Gopi; Narendra Prasad; Geetha; Biyon
- Cinematography: Ravi K. Chandran
- Edited by: L. Bhoominathan
- Music by: Johnson
- Production company: Christ King Productions
- Distributed by: Aardra Films Release
- Release date: 1992
- Country: India
- Language: Malayalam

Thalasthanam (transl. The Capital) is a 1992 Malayalam-language Political crime drama film directed by Shaji Kailas and written by Renji Panicker. The film stars Suresh Gopi, alongside Geetha, Narendra Prasad, Monisha, M. G. Soman, K. B. Ganesh Kumar and Vijayakumar. The film explores the concepts of campus politics and the impact of anti social elements in students.

The film was shot extensively in and around Kozhikode, Thiruvananthapuram and the Kerala University campus. Renji Panicker, Chippy and Vijayakumar debuted as actors through this film. Johnson composed the music, while Ravi K. Chandran and L. Bhoominathan handled the cinematography and editing respectively.

Thalasthanam was released on 12 July 1992 and was a commercial success at the box office. The film was remade in Telugu as Rajadhani.

== Plot ==
Unnikrishnan is an easy going youth who joins a law college, where he along with first-year students are ragged by seniors under the leadership of Pappan, a student leader with strong political clout. Pappan violently thrashes down Unnikrishnan after he opposed the ragging by Pappan. Unnikrishnan gets insulted in front of girls, where he stabs Pappan at the corridor of the college in retaliation. G. Parameshwaran alias G.P., who is Pappan's political mentor, orders his goons to bring Unnikrishnan. Upon recognizing the potential of Unnikrishnan, G.P. inducts him into the party and strikes a truce between Pappan and Unnikrishnan.

The bill on self-financing colleges was introduced by the Government of Kerala, where the party decides to oppose the bill under the leadership of G.P. and launch a student agitation campaign, where Unnikrishnan is appointed as the leader of the movement. With the intention of spreading the violence throughout state, G.P decides to immolate Unnikrishnan in front of the cops and press. Unnikrishnan is killed and his death is used as a powerful weapon by G.P against the government, but Unnikrishnan's death has also become a big blow to his family. Unnikrishnan's elder brother Harikrishnan arrives in Kerala from Mumbai to perform the funeral rituals.

Harikrishnan becomes suspicious about Unnikrishnan's death and decides to investigate the reason behind the murder. Harikrishnan faces the wrath from several corners including the college management, cops and local politicians, where his attempts to convince the CM for an inquiry comes to no avail. Harikrishnan meets Meera, an aggressive journalist, who is the witness of Unnikrishnan's death. After learning about G.P's plans, Harikrishnan decides to fight against his violent political ways. where he faces several physical attacks from the hoodlums of G.P, but Harikrishnan manages to defeat them and burns G.P alive with the help of the college students.

== Cast ==
- Suresh Gopi as Harikrishnan
  - Sudheesh as Young Harikrishnan
- Narendra Prasad as G. Parameswaran aka G. P
- Vijayakumar as Unnikrishnan
  - Biyon as Young Unnikrishnan
- Geetha as Meera Menon
- Suchitra as Supriya
- Monisha Unni as Radha
  - Baby Ambili as Young Radha
- Ashokan as Pappan
- Idavela Babu as Nambeeshan
- K.B. Ganesh Kumar as ASP George Varghese Indian Police Service
- M. G. Soman as Kannappan, Hari's and Unni's Uncle
- Janardhanan as Chief Minister Balagopalan
- Vijayaraghavan as Vinayachandran, Excise Minister
- Jagadish as Sanjay, College Student
- Maniyanpilla Raju as Eshwara Menon, College Professor
- Shammi Thilakan as Shaji, Police Officer
- K. P. A. C. Sunny as Minister Gopalan
- K. P. A. C. Azeez as City Police Commissioner Aravindakshan
- Jagannatha Varma as College Principal Alexander Koshy
- Kunchan as Chandran, College Peon
- Kollam Thulasi as Basheer
- Santhosh as Ali, G.P's Henchman
- Usharani as Hari's and Unni's Aunt
- T.S.Krishnan as G. P's Henchman
- Renji Panicker as Journalist
- Chippy
- Baiju Ezhupunna as Vinod, Police Officer

== Production ==
The film was shot in various locations including St. Joseph Devagiri College, Kozhikode, M.G. College, Thiruvananthapuram and Kerala university campus, Kariavattom, University Hostel Kariavattom Thiruvananthapuram.

== Soundtrack ==
The film features original songs composed by Johnson, with lyrics written by O. N. V. Kurup and Gireesh Puthenchery.

Track	Title	Singer(s)	Lyricist
1	Amberin Thaalam	K. S. Chithra, M. G. Sreekumar	O. N. V Kurup
2	Ee Yaamini	K. S. Chithra, M. G. Sreekumar	O. N. V Kurup
3	Pookalam Poyenno	K. S. Chithra	Gireesh Puthenchery

== Reception ==
Thalastaanam was released on 11 July 1992 in Kerala. The film became a commercial success at the box office. The satellite rights of the film were sold to Amrita TV.
