= Mafia (1993 film) =

- Poster
- Directed by: Shaji Kailas
- Written by: Renji Panicker
- Produced by: Jubilent Films
- Starring: Suresh Gopi; Vikram; Tiger Prabhakar; Babu Antony; Vijayaraghavan; Janardhanan
- Cinematography: Ravi K. Chandran
- Edited by: L. Bhoominathan
- Music by: C. Rajamani; Lyrics: Bichu Thirumala
- Distributed by: Jubilent Films
- Release date: 13 November 1993
- Running time: 157 minutes
- Country: India
- Language: Malayalam

Mafia is a 1993 Indian Malayalam-language action thriller film directed by Shaji Kailas and written by Renji Panicker. It stars Suresh Gopi in the lead role alongside Vikram, Tiger Prabhakar, Janardhanan, Vijayaraghavan and Babu Antony.

Mafia was released on 13 November 1993 on Diwali day and became successful at the box office. The movie was remade twice in Hindi First as Mafia (1996) and second as Loha (1997) both starring Dharmendra in the lead role.

== Plot ==
DYSP Jayashankar (Janardhanan), a sincere senior cop, working for the Bangalore City Police Department (BCPD) is in a direct fight with a crime boss named Surya Devaraja Gowda (Tiger Prabhakar), who rules the city along with his younger brother Chandra Gowda (Babu Antony) Jayashankar's family is too worried about his safety and younger brother Harishankar Vikram) always reminds him of it. Shivaraman "Shivappa" (Vijayaraghavan), a former mafia leader is now leading a retired life in the city suburbs running a stable. Though retired, he has deep vengeance against Gowda, who had broken his leg, making him permanently disabled. Jayashankar longs his brother Ravishankar (Suresh Gopi) to join the IPS. Ravishankar is currently working for a leading Bangalore daily Deccan Chronicle, Ravi is also attempting for IPS.

One day, Jayashankar receives a piece of information that a consignment belonging to Gowda is arriving in the city. Along with SI Narayanan (Maniyanpilla Raju), Jayashankar manages to seize the trucks, but gets shot and killed by Gowda's goons. Ravi, who has just got a letter confirming his selection for IPS, reaches Jayashankar to inform the news, witnesses the brutal murder of Jayashankar. Ravi reaches out to the commissioner's office, but is shocked to find the killers, having a small talk with DCP Govindan (M.G. Soman). Ravi reacts violently and raises his hands at Govindan, accusing him of siding with Gowda. Govindan orders the arrest of Ravi, where the court sentences him to 2 years imprisonment for assaulting a senior cop on duty. Ravi loses his IPS selection because of his prison term.

Upon release, Ravi decides to avenge Jayashankar's death. Hari introduces Ravi to Alexandra "Sandra" Amelia Felix, the daughter of an ex-mafiosi, who was killed by Gowda. Sandra is now running a few business offices of which Hari is the manager. Sandra agrees to help Ravi in his mission, where she introduces him to Shivappa. Though initially reluctant, Ravi agrees to provide money and weapons in the war against Gowda. The central government nominates and promotes Govindan as the city commissioner. At a function organized to felicitate Govindan, Ravi intrudes along with Hari and insults him publicly.

The sudden and violent reaction of Govindan is recorded and passed over to higher authorities, causing Govindan's suspension. Ravi targets the establishments of Gowda, where he along with Shivappa blackmails Home Minister Nanjappa and gets Gowda's warehouses raided. The financial losses enrages Gowda and sends Chandra to finish out Ravi, but Chandra is killed by Ravi. Gowda kidnaps Hari and offers a deal. Upon the demand of Gowda, Ravi arrives, but along with Shivappa and his mercenaries. Ravi successfully saves Hari and finishes off Gowda by overrunning cars over him.

== Cast ==
- Suresh Gopi as Ravishankar
- Vikram as Harishankar, younger brother of Jayashankar and Ravishankar
- Janardhanan as DYSP Jayashankar, elder brother of Ravishankar and Harishankar who is being killed by Gowda's goons.
- Tiger Prabhakar as Surya Devaraja Gowda, the main antagonist
- Babu Antony as Chandra Devaraja Gowda, younger brother of Gowda and the secondary antagonist
- Vijayaraghavan as Sivaraman (Shivappa)
- Geetha as Alexandra 'Sandra' Amelia Felix
- M. G. Soman as Deputy City Police Commissioner M.T. Govindan
- Prathapachandran as City Police Commissioner N.Warrier IPS
- Rajan P. Dev as Moosa
- K. B. Ganesh Kumar as Murugan, Ravisankar's friend
- Maniyanpilla Raju as SI Narayanan
- Augustine as Anwar, Ravisankar's friend
- Sathaar as Krishnan, Personal Assistant and right hand of Gowda
- Ranjitha as Rekha, Warrier's Daughter and Harishankar's Lover
- Renuka as Uma, Jayashankar's Wife
- Yuvarani as Sudha, Ravishankar, Harishankar and Jayashankar's Sister
- T. S. Krishnan as Gowda's Henchman
- Renji Panicker as Excise/Home Minister Nanjappa
- Silk Smitha as Item dancer
- Remyasree as Basanthi, Gowda's Wife
- Vinod Kozhikode as Gowda's Henchman

== Box office ==
The film was commercial success at the box office.
