= Suresh Gopi =

Indian actor, playback singer, television presenter and politician (born 1958)

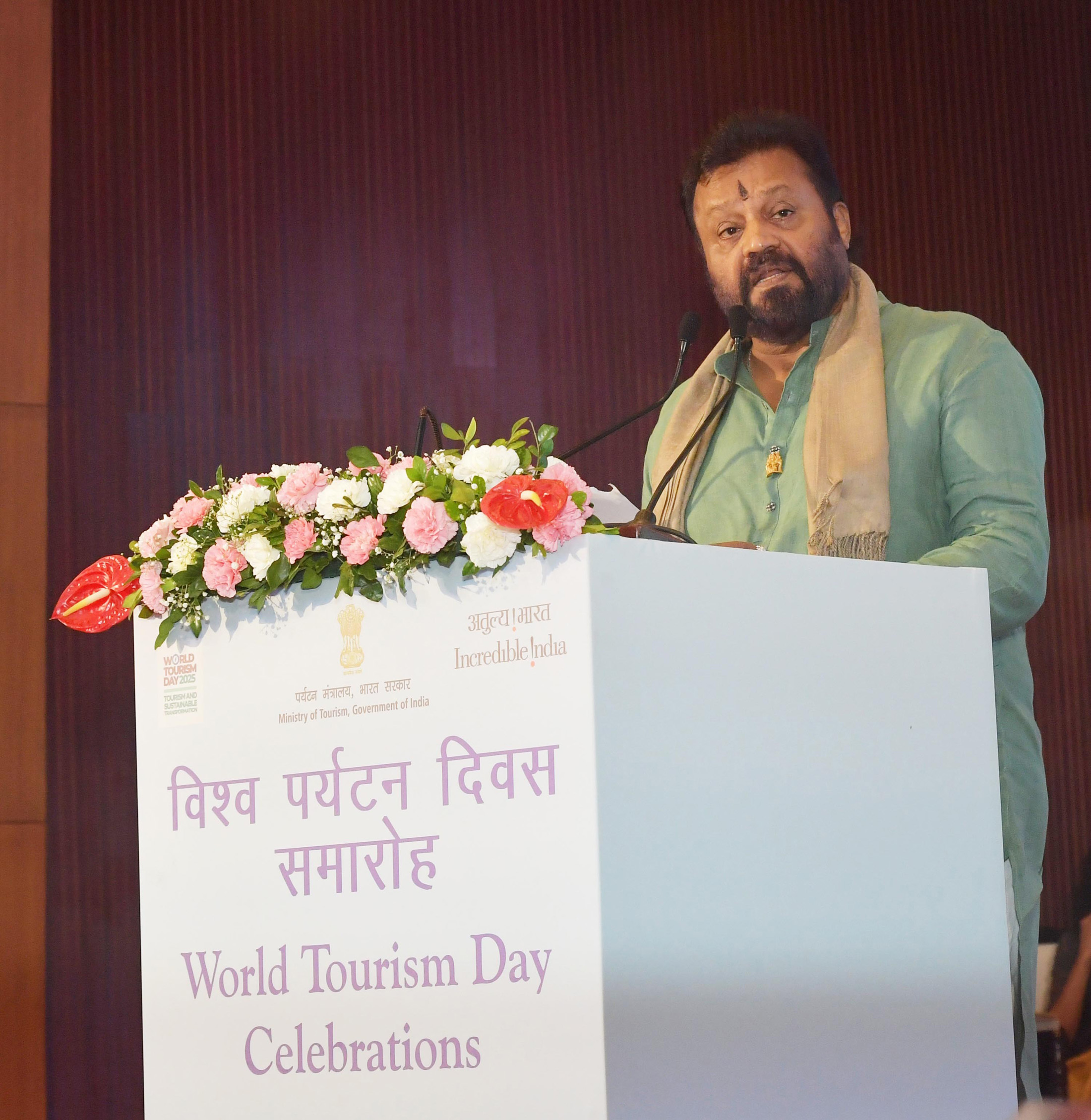
- Gopi in 2025

Union Minister of State for Petroleum and Natural Gas
- Incumbent
- Assumed office 9 June 2024
- Prime Minister: Narendra Modi
- Minister: Hardeep Singh Puri
- Preceded by: Rameswar Teli

Union Minister of State for Tourism
- Incumbent
- Assumed office 9 June 2024
- Prime Minister: Narendra Modi
- Minister: Gajendra Singh Shekhawat
- Preceded by: Shripad Naik; Ajay Bhatt

Member of Parliament, Lok Sabha
- Incumbent
- Assumed office 4 June 2024
- Preceded by: T. N. Prathapan
- Constituency: Thrissur, Kerala

Member of Parliament, Rajya Sabha
- In office 29 April 2016 – 24 April 2022
- Constituency: Nominated

Personal details
- Born: 26 June 1958 (age 68) Alappuzha, Kerala, India
- Party: Bharatiya Janata Party
- Spouse: Radhika Nair (m. 1990)
- Children: 5, including Gokul Suresh (Note: One child, Lakshmi Suresh, is deceased.)
- Relatives: Aranmula Ponnamma (grandmother-in-law)
- Education: Fatima Mata National College (B.Sc., M.A.)
- Occupation: Actor; playback singer; television presenter; politician
- Awards: National Film Awards; Kerala State Film Awards
- Years active: 1965, 1986–present

Suresh Gopi (born 26 June 1958) is an Indian actor, playback singer, television presenter and politician who is currently serving as the Minister of State for Petroleum and Natural Gas and the Minister of Tourism since June 2024. He was elected as a Member of Parliament, Lok Sabha in the 2024 general election from Thrissur Lok Sabha constituency, becoming the first BJP MP from Kerala, marking the party’s first-ever victory in a Lok Sabha election in the state. He is also serving as the President of the Satyajit Ray Film and Television Institute from September 2023.

He works predominantly in Malayalam cinema and has also appeared in some Tamil, Telugu, Kannada, and Hindi films. Suresh made his acting debut as a child in the 1965 film Odayil Ninnu and as an adult in 1986 and has since acted in more than 250 films. In 1998, he won the National Film Award for Best Actor and Kerala State Film Award for Best Actor for his performance in Kaliyattam.

He served as a nominated member of the Rajya Sabha, the upper house of the Parliament of India from 2016 to 2022. Additionally, he is also a philanthropist, social worker, and advocates for environmental protection.

== Early life and education ==
Suresh Gopi was born in Alappuzha district, Kerala to his parents K. Gopinathan Pillai, a film distributor, and V. Gnanalekshmi Amma as their eldest son. He has three brothers: Subhash Gopi, and twins Sunil G. Pillai and Sanil G. Pillai. His parents hail from present-day Kollam district. After he was born, Suresh Gopi's family moved to his father's house in Kollam and he was brought up in Kollam. His ancestral home is in Madannada, Kollam, and Kollurvila Bharanikavu Devi Temple in Pallimukku is his family temple.

Suresh attended Infant Jesus Anglo-Indian School in Kollam. Later, he completed his bachelor's degree in Zoology and a master's degree in English literature from the Fatima Mata National College in Kollam.

== Film career ==
=== 1986–92: Early years ===
Suresh made his debut as a child artist in 1965 by playing a brief role in Odayil Ninnu. Later, he made his debut as an adult in 1986 with an uncredited role in Niramulla Raavukal. He gained attention through the minor role of a prospective groom in T. P. Balagopalan M. A. (1986). Suresh went on to play few antagonistic and numerous supporting roles throughout the late 1980s and early 1990s. He was noted for his villain role in Irupatham Noottandu (1987). It was the highest grossing Malayalam movie of that time. He had a major supporting role as Harry in Oru CBI Diary Kurippu (1988). Suresh's comic role as sub-inspector Minnal Prathapan in Manu Uncle (1988) has over the years attained a cult status. His portrayal of Dr. Narendran in Padmarajan's 1990 film Innale (1990) was critically acclaimed and is considered by fans and critics to be one of the best performances of his career. He also gained appraisal for his portrayal of Aromal Chekavar in the 1989 drama Oru Vadakkan Veeragatha. He played another cameo comic role as Christopher Luke, a professional killer in Nagarangalil Chennu Raparkam (1989). His other notable films during the late 1980s include Bhoomiyile Rajakkanmar, New Delhi (1987), Moonnam Mura, 1921 (1988), Varnam, Douthyam, Nair Saab (1989). His notable films during the early 1990s includes In Harihar Nagar and Thoovalsparsham both released in 1990.

=== 1992–95: Breakthrough and stardom ===
After acting in more than 80 movies, Suresh finally got a breakthrough by playing the lead role in Shaji Kailas's Thalastaanam (1992), which was written by Renji Panicker. Suresh established himself as a bankable star in Malayalam cinema through Ekalavyan (1993). This crime thriller was also written by Renji Panicker and directed by Shaji Kailas. The film was a major box office success and completed 150 days in theaters. Shaji-Renji combination films turned Suresh into an overnight star in 1990s especially through police and army roles. In 1993 itself, he played the lead role in Mafia, another Shaji-Renji crime thriller which was very successful at box office. The same year, he played the role of Nakulan alongside Mohanlal and Shobhana in Fazil's psychological thriller Manichitrathazhu, which is considered one of the best Malayalam movies ever made. He played the role of a NSG commando in Kashmeeram (1994), which was a commercial success. His 1994 film Commissioner, where he played the role of Bharath Chandran I.P.S, was a major commercial success in Kerala and pushed his superstardom to neighboring Telugu-speaking state where it was a box office success. Commissioner is also treated as a cult classic film. He played the role of a RAW officer in Highway (1995) which ran for more than 100 days in theatres.

=== 1996–2005: Further commercial successes ===
Suresh Gopi's high budget film Yuvathurki (1996) failed to create expected results at box office. The same year, he appeared in a different avatar by playing the role of a wildlife photographer in Rajaputran. It became one of the highest grossing Malayalam movies in 1996.

One of his popular and career best character Anakkattil Chackochi came out through Lelam in 1997. Scripted by Renji panicker and directed by Joshiy, it was one of the highest-grossing movies of the year. The role of Kannan Perumalayan in Jayaraj's Kaliyattam (1997) won him the National Film Award for Best Actor and the Kerala State Film Award for Best Actor. His other notable movies in 1997 were Janathipathyam and Guru. In Guru, he played a supporting role. Suresh Gopi's played a lead role alongside Jayaram in the comedy drama Summer in Bethlehem (1998). He played the character Dennis and received wide appreciation from the critics. It was also the third highest-grossing movie in 1998. His other notable movies in 1998 were Thalolam and Pranayavarnangal.

Suresh's action thriller film Pathram (1999) directed by Joshiy was one of the highest grossing Malayalam movie in 1999. The film, which ran over 275 days in theatres is also considered by many fans to be one of the best in his career. The same year he starred in another Joshiy action thriller Vazhunnor which was also a commercial hit. In 1999, two of his popular crime investigation thrillers Crime File and F. I. R came out. Both films were commercially successful.

In 2000, Suresh starred in Mark Antony and Cover Story, an action film and a crime thriller. He played a lead role, with comic elements, in the comedy drama Thenkasipattanam (2000) alongside Lal. The film was one of the highest grossers at the box office and ran for more than 275 days in theatres. Suresh Gopi played the lead role in Rajasenan's horror film Megasandesam (2001). His other notable movies in 2001 are the comedy drama Sundara Purushan and an investigation thriller Nariman. In 2003, he appeared in a lead role alongside Kunchacko Boban in Rajasenan's family drama Swapnam Kondu Thulabharam. In 2005, he did the lead role in Renji Panicker's Bharathchandran I.P.S., a sequel to the 1994 film Commissioner. The film was a major hit at the box office. His performance is Makalkku (2005) was critically acclaimed.

=== 2006–2015: Decline and hiatus ===
Suresh Gopi's fanbase slowly started to diminish during the mid-2000s with many of his movies released in 2006 becoming a failure at the box office. This includes films such as Lanka, Rashtram, Pathaaka, Ashwaroodan, Bada Dosth and Smart City. However, his legal thriller Chinthamani Kolacase directed by Shaji Kailas was a blockbuster at the box office in 2006. Suresh Gopi played the lead role of a psychotic lawyer, who enforces the law in his style.

Most of his movies released after Chinthamani Kolacase were failures at the box office. It includes movies such as Paranju Theeratha Visheshangal, Black Cat, Kichamani MBA and Time all of which released in 2007. The same year he had a special appearance in the science fiction film Bharathan Effect. His commercially successful film in 2007 were the crime investigation thrillers Detective and Nadiya Kollappetta Rathri. In 2008, Suresh Gopi did a lead role in the multi-starrer blockbuster Twenty:20. In 2009, he was praised for his role as Ramesh Menon in the anthology film Kerala Cafe in the segment Lalitham Hiranmayam.

In 2010, he played the role of a father seeking revenge upon those who raped his daughter in Janakan which earned him appreciation. In 2011, he appeared in the multi-starrer film Christian Brothers. The same year, Suresh acted in the film Melvilasom which received wide critical acclaim upon its release. Suresh reunited with Shaji Kailas and Renji Panicker in 2012 through The King & the Commissioner. In the film, which is a crossover of Commissioner (1994) and The King (1995), Suresh Gopi reprised his role as Bharathchandran I.P.S along with Mammootty reprising his role as Joseph Alex from The King. He was praised for his role as Dr. Vijay Nambiar in Apothecary (2014). He was nominated for the Best Actor award at the Filmfare Awards South for his performance in the movie. Suresh played the villain role in the Tamil film action thriller film I (2015). My God (2015) was his last film before going to a 4-year hiatus from acting.

=== 2020–present: Return after hiatus ===
In March 2019, he made a comeback announcement in acting by joining Vijay Antony starrer Tamil film Tamilarasan. The film was released in 2023 after getting delayed due to COVID-19 pandemic in India. Suresh Gopi made his comeback in Malayalam cinema by playing a pivotal role in Varane Avashyamund in 2020, after a five year long hiatus. The movie also saw the reunion of Suresh Gopi and Shobana after a span of 15 years. The movie was a major success at box office and was critically acclaimed. In June 2020, Tomichan Mulakuppadam announced to produce Suresh Gopi's 250th movie. The film titled as Ottakkomban would see Suresh playing the role of Kuruvachan. On 14 February 2021, Suresh announced that he will be reuniting with director Joshiy for the film titled Paappan. The film was a commercial success at the box office. His other movie Kaaval, an action thriller directed by Nithin Renji Panicker which also feature Renji Panicker playing a pivotal role. His 2023 crime thriller film Garudan was also a commercial success at the box office.

== Television host ==
In 2012, he hosted the game show Ningalkkum Aakaam Kodeeshwaran on Asianet, which was the Malayalam version of Who Wants to Be a Millionaire?. He continued to host it five more seasons. He has also hosted Anchinodu Inchodinchu on Surya TV.

== Political career ==
=== Early politics ===
During his college days, Suresh Gopi was an active member of the Students' Federation of India (SFI), the student wing of the Communist Party of India (Marxist) (CPIM). Later in his life, he developed an admiration for stateswoman Indira Gandhi and the Indian National Congress (INC). In the 2006 Kerala Legislative Assembly election, he campaigned for both Left Democratic Front (LDF) and United Democratic Front candidates. He campaigned for LDF candidate V. S. Achuthanandan in Malampuzha constituency and UDF candidate M. P. Gangadharan in Ponnani constituency.

=== Member of Rajya Sabha ===
On 29 April 2016, Suresh Gopi was sworn in as a Member of Parliament (MP) in the Rajya Sabha, nominated by the President of India in the category of eminent citizens as per the provisions of Article 80 of the Constitution of India. He opted Thiruvananthapuram district as the nodal district of operation under the Members of Parliament Local Area Development Scheme. In May 2016, he was enlisted as a member in the standing committee of the Ministry of Communication and Information Technology and in the Consultative Committee for the Ministry of Civil Aviation. From 2019 to 2022, he was also a member of the Consultative Committee for the Ministry of Tribal Affairs and the Coconut Development Board.

=== Electoral performance ===
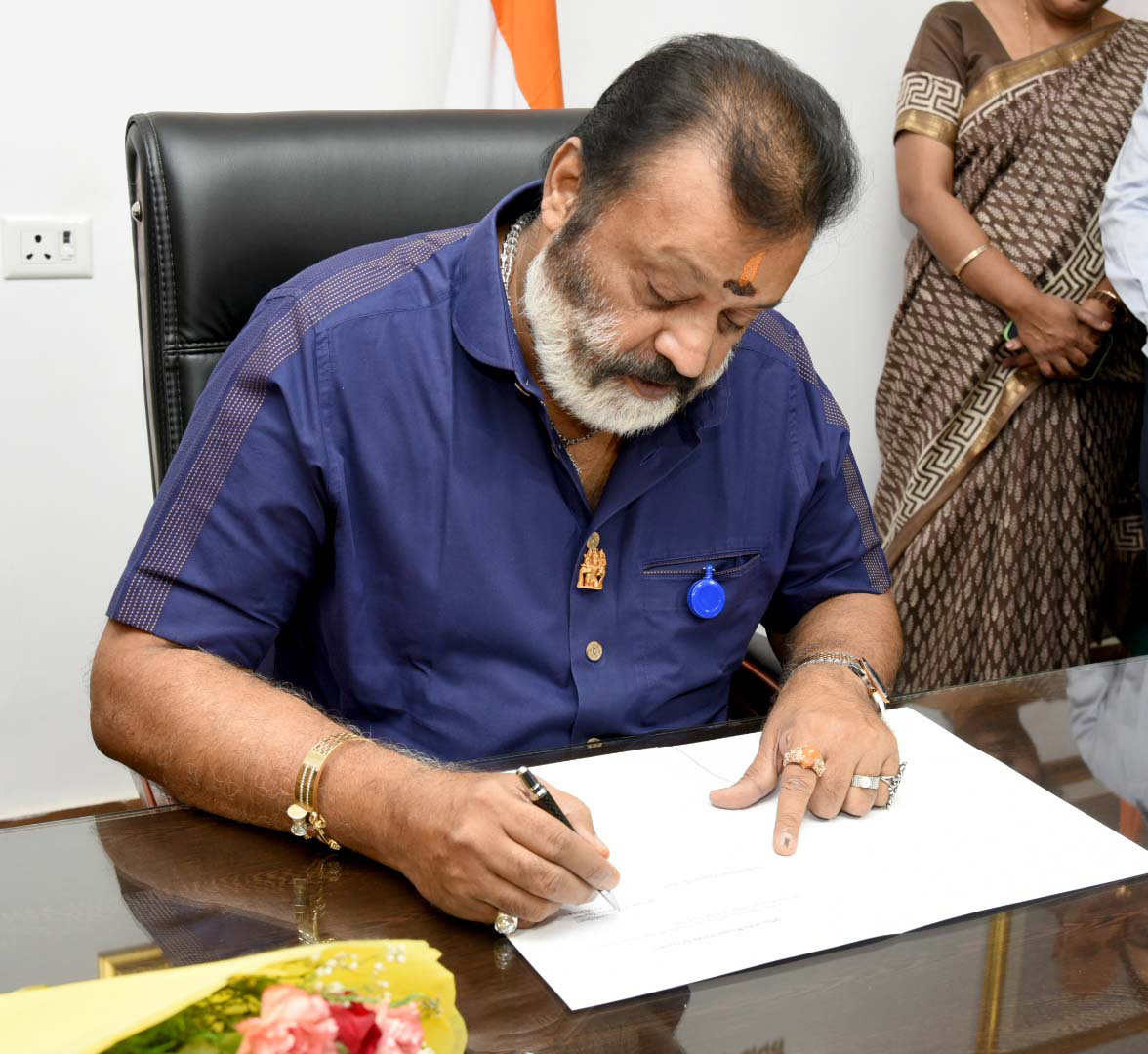
Suresh Gopi assuming charge as the Minister of State for Tourism.

In October 2016, Suresh Gopi officially joined the Bharatiya Janata Party (BJP). In 2019, he contested in the 2019 Indian general election in Kerala as a candidate of the BJP from Thrissur constituency. He lost in the election to the Indian National Congress (INC) candidate T.N. Prathapan and secured third position behind the Communist Party of India (CPI) candidate Rajaji Mathew Thomas (who came second). He managed to receive 293,822 votes, which was more than double the votes received by the candidate of BJP in the previous election.

In 2021, he filed nomination to contest in the 2021 Kerala Legislative Assembly election to be a member of the Kerala Legislative Assembly. He said that he was asked by the Prime Minister of India, Narendra Modi, to contest in the legislative assembly election. He contested from the Thrissur Assembly constituency as a candidate of BJP. However, he lost to P. Balachandran of CPI, coming third after INC candidate Padmaja Venugopal, securing a total of 40,457 votes.

In March 2024, he was announced as the BJP candidate from the Thrissur constituency for the 2024 Lok Sabha elections. He won the seat with a majority of over 74,000 votes, becoming the first BJP Lok Sabha MP from Kerala. Of the seven assembly constituencies that make up the Thrissur Lok Sabha segment, Suresh was ahead in six, except Guruvayoor: Manalur by 8,013 votes, Ollur by 10,363 votes, Thrissur by 14,117 votes, Nattika by 13,945 votes, Irinjalakuda by 13,016 votes and Puthukad by 12,692 votes. He was appointed as the Minister of State for Petroleum and Natural Gas, as well as the Minister of State for Tourism, in the third Modi ministry in June 2024.

Election	Year	Party	Constituency	Result	Margin	Vote Share(%)
Lok Sabha	2019	BJP	Thrissur	Lost	1,21,267	28.19
Kerala Legislative Assembly	2021	BJP	Thrissur	Lost	3,806	31.30
Lok Sabha	2024	BJP	Thrissur	Won	74,686	37.80

== Controversies ==
=== "Upper caste" remark ===
In 2024, While campaigning in New Delhi, Suresh Gopi suggested that individuals from "upper castes," such as Brahmins or Naidus, should be given the tribal affairs portfolio for the welfare of tribal communities. He also suggested that tribal leaders could handle the welfare of "forward communities. The statement drew immediate criticism from opposition parties in Kerala, who accused him of upholding the caste system.

=== Voter fraud allegations ===
In 2025, Opposition parties, including the Congress and the CPI(M), accused Suresh of winning the Thrissur Lok Sabha seat through large-scale bogus voting.

== Personal life ==
On 8 February 1990, Suresh Gopi married Radhika Nair, the granddaughter of actress Aranmula Ponnamma. They have five children—Lakshmi Suresh, Gokul Suresh, Bhagya Suresh, Bhavni Suresh, and Madhav Suresh. Lakshmi died in a car accident while she was one-and-a-half years old. Gokul Suresh is an actor in Malayalam cinema. Suresh resides with family in Sasthamangalam, Thiruvananthapuram.

== Awards and nominations ==
National Film Awards

- 1998: Best Actor – Kaliyattam

Kerala State Film Awards

- 1998: Best Actor – Kaliyattam

Kerala Film Critics Association Awards

- 1993: Best Actor – Ekalavyan, Manichitrathazhu, Ponnuchami
- 1995: Best Actor – Saadaram, Sindoora Rekha, Sakshyam
- 1997: Best Actor – Kaliyattam
- 2021: Ruby Jubilee Award

Filmfare Awards South

- 2014: Nominated – Best Actor – Apothecary
- 2016: Nominated - Best Actor in a Negative Role- I

Other Awards

- 2009: Bharat Gopy Award
- 2015: Sathyan National Film Award
- 2024: Sree Chakra Award by Venpalavattom Temple Trust

== See also ==
- Third Modi ministry
