= Ekalavyan (film) =

1993 Indian film by Shaji Kailas

- Theatrical release poster
- Directed by: Shaji Kailas
- Written by: Renji Panicker
- Produced by: P. V. Gangadharan
- Starring: Suresh Gopi
- Cinematography: Ravi K. Chandran
- Edited by: L. Bhoominathan
- Music by: Rajamani
- Production company: Grahalakshmi Productions
- Distributed by: Kalpaka Release
- Release date: 27 August 1993
- Running time: 160 minutes
- Country: India
- Language: Malayalam

Ekalavyan is a 1993 Indian Malayalam-language action thriller film directed by Shaji Kailas, written by Renji Panicker and produced by P. V. Gangadharan. The film stars Suresh Gopi, alongside Siddique, Geetha, Narendra Prasad, Vijayaraghavan, Ganesh Kumar, Janardhanan, Madhu, Maathu, Jagathy Sreekumar, Kuthiravattam Pappu and Devan.

Ekalavyan released on 27 August 1993 and was a commercial success at the box office in Kerala, along with its dubbed Telugu version, CBI Officer, in Andhra Pradesh.

== Plot ==
Swami Amoorthananda, a psychotic holy godman with strong international connections, runs a powerful narcotics mafia in Kerala. He also has several connections within political circles and is also a good orator, where he draws many devotees from abroad and turns them into addicts.

A series of murders at Kovalam beach invites sharp criticism of the Kerala Government and the C.M Sreedharan decides to bring Madhavan, a Narcotics Wing officer, to investigate the case. Arriving in Kerala from New Delhi and assisted by a smart CI Sharath Chandran, Madhavan's aggressive way of investigation leads him to Amoorthananda's ashram, which creates a panic in the state.

Amoorthananda decides to eliminate Madhavan and also plans to topple Sreedharan by appointing his aide Velayudhan as the new CM. Upon the orders from Amoorthananda, Mahesh Nair, an international narcotic criminal, arrives in Kerala and kills Sharath. An enraged Madhavan raids the ashram and botches Amoorthananda's plot to cause a series of bomb blasts in the state. Amoorthananda falls from a building and dies, after which Madhavan kills Mahesh Nair by placing a bomb in his mouth, thus saving the state from the blasts and communal riots.

== Cast ==
- Suresh Gopi as Madhavan IPS
- Siddique as CI Sarath Chandran
- Narendra Prasad as Swami Amoorthananda
- Madhu as Sreedharan, Chief Minister of Kerala
- Vijayaraghavan as Cheradi Skariah
- Geetha as Maya Menon
- Maathu as Malu
- K. B. Ganesh Kumar as Unni Joseph Mulaveedan
- Janardhanan as Krishnan / Saghavu C. K, Opposition Leader
- Jagathy Sreekumar as SI Achuthan Nair
- Rajan P. Dev as Velayudhan, Home Minister of Kerala
- K. P. A. C. Azeez as IG Devadas IPS
- Devan as Mahesh Nair
- Augustine as SI Geevarghese
- Kuthiravattam Pappu as Govindan Kutty
- Chithra as Hemambaram
- Maniyanpilla Raju as Vallapuzha Chandran, "Manasamaina" Journalist
- Kunchan as Keshu
- Sadiq as Anto
- T. S. Krishnan as Salim Khan
- Usharani as Mathaji
- Ragini as SI Valsamma
- Renji Panicker as Airport Passenger
- Suma Jayaram as Susanna John
- Remyasree as Cheradi Skariah's Wife

== Production ==
The film was shot mostly around Trivandrum and Kovalam and a large part was also shot in Kozhikode. The film was produced by P. V. Gangadharan under Grihalakshmi Productions. The cinematography was handled by Ravi K. Chandran and editing by L. Bhoominathan. C. Rajamani composed the musical score, while Boban was the art director. Initially, actor Mammootty was approached for the lead role.

== Box office ==
Ekalavyan was also dubbed into Telugu and Tamil, as CBI Officer. The commercial success of the film in Andhra Pradesh earned Gopi the title of "supreme star" from Telugu media.

== Legacy ==
Madhavan IPS re appeared in the Mammooty starrer, The King (1995). The 2014 Hindi-language film Singham Returns directed by Rohit Shetty was reportedly inspired from Ekalavyan. Success of this movie propelled Suresh Gopi to superstardom.
