= Urvashi filmography =

Kavitha Ranjini, known by the stage name Urvashi, is an Indian actress, dubbing artist, television host, scriptwriter and producer known for her works in the Southern film industry, predominantly in Malayalam and Tamil films. She has acted in nearly 350 films in Malayalam, Tamil, Telugu, Kannada and Hindi.

She started her acting career as a child artist, in a Malayalam movie Kathirmandapam, released in 1979. Her first released film as heroine was Mundhanai Mudichu (Tamil, directed by K. Bhagyaraj) in 1983. She was a prominent lead actress of the 1980s and 1990s, primarily in Malayalam Films. She has written the films Ulsavamelam and Pidakkozhi Koovunna Noottandu, the latter was also produced by her. She won the National Film Award for Best Supporting Actress for her performance in Achuvinte Amma (2005), which was her comeback film after a hiatus of 6 years. She has won the Kerala State Film Award for Best Actress a record five times, which includes three consecutive wins from 1989 to 1991. She has also received two Tamil Nadu State Film Awards.

Urvashi was born to popular drama actors Chavara V. P. Nair and Vijayalakshmi in Sooranad in Kollam district of Kerala .Her elder sisters are actors Kalaranjini and Kalpana. She married actor Manoj K. Jayan on 2 May 1998, which ended in divorce in 2008.

== Filmography ==
Key
†	Denotes films that have not yet been released

=== As actress ===
==== Malayalam films ====
List of Urvashi Malayalam film credits
Year	Title	Role	Notes
1979	Kathirmandapam	Child artist	
1979	Sayoojyam	Child artist	"Kaalithozhuthil" Song Scene
1979	Sikharangal	Child artist	
1980	Dwik Vijayam	Dance Student	
1982	Yaagam		
1982	Snehasammanam	—	Unreleased
1983	Hello Madras Girl	Latha	
1984	Ethirppukal	Sudha	First lead role
1985	Ente Ammu Ninte Thulasi Avarude Chakki	Thulasi	
1985	Nirakkoottu	Sasikala	
1985	Daivatheorthu	Nani	
1985	Pathamudayam	Valsala	
1985	Karimpinpoovinakkare	Chandrika	
1986	Yuvajanotsavam	Sindhu	
1986	Sunil Vayassu 20	Premalatha	
1986	Mizhineerpoovukal	Aswathy	
1986	Sukhamo Devi	Devi	
1986	Kshamichu Ennoru Vakku	Rajani	
1986	Manasilloru Manimuthu	Radhika	
1986	Desatanakkili Karayarilla	Devika	
1986	Onnu Randu Moonnu	Indu	
1986	Moonnu Masagalkku Munpu	Raji	
1986	Nandi Veendum Varika	Devayani	
1987	Adimakal Udamakal	Indu	
1987	New Delhi	Uma	
1987	Agni Muhurtham	Sudha	
1987	Kottum Kuravayum	Annie	
1987	Oru Sindoora Pottinte Ormakku	Sophie	
1987	Naalkkavala	Amina	
1987	Irupatham Noottandu	Jyothi	
1987	Swargam	Latha	
1988	Anuragi	Leelamma	
1988	Mukthi	Sudharma	
1988	Mattoral	Veni	
1988	Padamudra	Lakshmi	
1988	Ponmuttayidunna Tharavu	Snehalatha	
1988	Simon Peter Ninakku Vendin	Alice Simon	
1988	Oru CBI Diary Kurippu	Annie	
1988	Abkari	Sridevi	
1988	1 August	Valsala	
1988	1921	Thulasi	
1988	Thanthram	Susanna	
1989	Pandu Pandoru Deshathu		
1989	Varnatheru	Asha	
1989	Swagatham	Philomina Francis	
1989	New Year	Rekha	
1989	Akshrathettu	Sumathi	
1989	Mazhavil Kavadi	Anandavalli	First State Award
1989	Chakkikotha Chankaran	Roshney	
1989	Adikkurippu	Geetha	
1989	Mrigaya	Annamma	
1990	Varthamanakalam	Arundhathi Menon	First State Award
1990	Noottonnu Raavukal	Sudha	
1990	Nammude Naadu	Bindu	
1990	Vyuham	Lakshmi	
1990	Kuttettan	Rose Mary	
1990	Marupuram	Retna	
1990	Veena Meettiya Vilangukal	Geetha	
1990	Thoovalsparsham	Maya	
1990	Thalayanamanthram	Kanchana	Second State Award
1990	Nanma Niranjavan Srinivasan	Chandrika	
1990	Kouthuka Varthakal	Aswathy	
1990	Lal Salam	Annamma	
1990	Arhatha	Aswathy	
1991	Vishnulokam	Kasthoori	
1991	Souhridham	Shiny	
1991	Mukha Chithram	Savithrikutty/Lakshmikutty	Third State Award
1991	Kakkathollayiram	Revathy	Third State Award
1991	Kadinjool Kalyanam	Hrudayakumari	Third State Award
1991	Chanchattam	Yamuna	
1991	Bharatham	Devi	Third State Award
1991	Kanalkkattu	Aasha	
1991	Koodikazhcha	Alice	
1991	Inspector Balram	Preethi Krishna Mathur	
1991	Bhoomika	Radha	
1992	Utsava Melam	Kanaka Prabha	Story
1992	Thiruthalvaadi	Lathika	
1992	Soorya Gayathri	Rugmini	
1992	Snehasagaram	Treesa	
1992	Simhadhwani	Jayasree	
1992	Sathyapathijna	Sreekutty	
1992	Ponnaramthottathe Rajavu	Radhika	
1992	My Dear Muthachan	Clara	
1992	Malootty	Raji	
1992	Ente Ponnu Thampuran	Kavitha	
1992	Aparatha	Prabha	
1992	Ardram	Mary	
1992	Aham	Renjini	
1992	Yodha	Damayanthi	
1992	Kizhakkan Pathrose	Chala Mary	
1993	Venkalam	Thankamani	
1993	Sthreedhanam	Vidhya	
1993	Narayam	Gayathri	
1993	Mithunam	Sulochana	
1993	Koushalam	Maya Devi	
1993	Kalippattam	Saroja	
1993	Injakkadan Mathai & Sons	Sherley	
1993	Ithu Manju Kaalam	Aswathy and Revathy	Dual role
1993	Aayirappara	Parvathy	
1993	Palayam	Jancy	
1994	Sukham Sukhakaram	Susie	
1994	Pidakkozhi Koovunna Noottandu	Bhagyarekha/Sujatha	Writer & Producer
1994	Kudumba Visesham	Geetha	
1994	The City	Dr. Jyothy	
1994	Bharya	Shailaja	
1995	Thovalapookkal	Chempakam	
1995	Spadikam	Thulasi	
1995	Simhavalan Menon	Geethanjali	
1996	Kazhakam	Radha	
1997	Kottapurathe Koottukudumbam	Sree Devi	
1997	Janadhipathyam	Indira Menon	
1999	Garshom	Noorja	Film Council Award
1999	Aayiram Meni	Alice	
1999	Niram	Herself	Archive footage
2005	Achuvinte Amma	K. P. Vanaja	National Film Award for Best Supporting Actress; Amritha TV Award & Film Council Award
2006	Madhuchandralekha	Chandramathi	Fifth State Award
2007	Ayur Rekha	Alice	Extended cameo
2008	Twenty:20	Herself	Archive footage Uncredited cameo
2009	Bharya Swantham Suhruthu	Molly	
2010	Mummy & Me	Clara	
2010	Sakudumbam Shyamala	Minister Shyamala Vasudevan	
2010	Best of Luck	Thamara	
2011	Ponnu Kondoru Aalroopam	Molly	
2011	Kadhayile Nayika	Nandhini	
2011	Maharaja Talkies	Vimala	
2012	Lumiere Brothers	Herself	Archive footage
2012	Lakshmivilasam Renuka Makan Raghuraman	Renuka	
2012	Manjadikuru	Sujatha	
2014	My Dear Mummy	Katrina	
2016	Vismayam	Lakshmi	Partially reshot version of Manamantha
2018	Aravindante Athidhikal	Girija	
2018	Ente Ummante Peru	Aisha	
2019	Swarnamalsyangal	Herself	Archive footage
2020	Dhamaka	Annamma	
2020	Varane Avashyamund	Dr. Sherly	Extended Cameo
2021	Keshu Ee Veedinte Nadhan	Rathnamma	Released on Disney+ Hotstar
2023	Charles Enterprises	Gomati	
2023	Jaladhara Pumpset Since 1962	Mrinalini teacher	
2023	Rani: The Real Story	Sheela	
2024	Iyer In Arabia	Jansi Rani	
2024	Ullozhukku	Leelamma	National Film Award for Best Supporting Actress
2024	Her	Santha	Released on ManoramaMAX
2025	L Jagadamma Ezham Class B	Jagadamma	Also producer
2025	Prince and Family	Home Minister Josephine	
2026	Madhuvidhu	Sarojini	Photo appearance
2026	Aasha	Aasha	

==== Tamil films ====
Year	Title	Role	Notes
1983	Mundhanai Mudichu	Parimalam	
1983	Apoorva Sahodarigal	Rosy	
1984	Dhavani Kanavugal	Film actress	
1984	Komberi Mookan	Priya	
1984	Nerupukkul Eeram	Ganga	
1984	Oh Maane Maane	Stella	
1984	Ambigai Neril Vanthaal	Latha	
1984	Anbe Odi Vaa	Seetha	
1984	Ezhuthatha Sattangal	Meena	
1984	Vai Pandal	Santhi	
1984	Vengaiyin Mainthan	Yamuna	
1984	Oorukku Upadesam	Janaki & Madhavi	
1984	Shanthi Mugurtham	Shanthi	
1984	Neram Nalla Neram	Vadivu	
1984	Vellai Pura Ondru	Padma	
1984	Maaman Machaan	Shanthi	
1984	Ninaivukal Maraivathillai	—	
1985	Andha Oru Nimidam	Vasanthi	
1985	Aduthathu Albert	Radha	
1985	Naam Iruvar	Ratha	
1985	Oru Malarin Payanam	Kalyani	
1985	Raja Yuvaraja	Meena	
1985	Deivapiravi	Lalitha	
1985	Panam Pathum Seyyum	Jayanthi	
1986	Thodarum Uravu	Julie	
1986	Kaidhiyin Theerpu	Stella & Preethi	
1986	Machakaran	—	
1987	Paruva Ragam	Rohini	Guest appearance
1988	Patti Sollai Thattathe	Seetha	
1989	Idhu Unga Kudumbam	Janaki	
1989	Paasa Mazhai	Gomathi	
1990	Michael Madana Kama Rajan	Tiruppurasundari	
1990	Pengal Veettin Kanngal	Raadha	
1991	Mookuthi Poo Meley	Latha Ramakrishnan	
1994	Subramaniya Swamy	Amudha	
1994	Magalir Mattum	Janaki	State Award
1994	Veera Padhakkam	Vishalakshi	
1994	Vanaja Girija	Chellamma	
1995	Naan Petha Magane	Uma Maheswari	
1995	Mayabazar	Sujatha (Suji) / Mayamma	
1995	Ayudha Poojai	Vasantha	
1995	Thaikulame Thaikulame	Janaki	
1995	Pullakuttikaaran	Azhagu	Critics Award
1996	Aruva Velu	Maruthayi	
1996	Irattai Roja	Uma	Filmfare Award
1996	Vetri Vinayagar	Ponni	
1997	Ettupatti Rasa	Palaniyamma	
1997	Mannava	Sinthamani	
1997	Aravindhan	Gayathri	
1997	Vasuki	Vasuki / Kodeeswari	
1999	Suyamvaram	Arivolimangai	
1999	Thirupathi Ezhumalai Venkatesa	Padmini	
1999	Viralukketha Veekkam	Gayatri	
1999	Kummi Paattu	Kamakshi	
2001	Sigamani Ramamani	Ramamani	
2002	Panchathantiram	Ammini	
2002	Game	Janaki	
2002	Thamizh	Kalaiselvi	
2003	Three Roses	Chandralekha	
2003	Thennavan	Pushpalatha	
2003	Success	Radha	
2003	Thaaye Bhuvaneswari	Parvathi	Partially reshot version of Vijayadasami
2005	Anbe Aaruyire	Maami	
2006	Desiya Paravai	Malini	
2007	Malaikottai	Kamala	
2007	Kalakkura Chandru	Host	
2009	Siva Manasula Sakthi	Kalyani	Edison Film Award
2009	Vaamanan	Divya's mother	
2009	Peraanmai	Victoria	
2010	Manmadan Ambu	Mallika	
2011	Doo	Vasanth's mother	
2011	Venghai	Thangam	
2011	Vedi	Dr. Radha Jeyachandran	
2013	Vanakkam Chennai	Chandra	
2014	Un Samayal Arayil	Chechi	
2014	Vizhi Moodi Yosithaal	KG's mother	
2014	Pechiyakka Marumagan	Pechiyakka	Unreleased
2015	Tamizhuku En Ondrai Azhuthavum	Vasanth's mother	
2015	Uthama Villain	Varalakshmi	
2015	Savaale Samaali	Urvashi	
2015	Inji Iduppazhagi	Rajeswari	
2015	India Pakistan	Kathik's mother	
2016	Adida Melam	Annapoorniyamma	
2016	Unnodu Ka	Rajalatchumi	
2016	Pencil	Rajeshwari	
2016	Vaaimai	Narayani	
2016	Meen Kuzhambum Mann Paanaiyum	Pavithra's mother	
2016	Bayam Oru Payanam	Abhinaya's mother	
2016	Kadavul Irukaan Kumaru	Gomathi Gopalakrishnan	
2017	Shivalinga	Arusuvai Annalakshmi	
2017	Magalir Mattum	Gomatha Silkurayappan	
2017	Palli Paruvathile	Kalai's mother	
2018	Koothan	Kalairasi	
2019	Dhilluku Dhuddu 2	Chakra Mahadevi	
2019	Pottu	Mohana	
2020	Putham Pudhu Kaalai	Lakshmi Krishnan	Released on Amazon Prime; Segment: Ilamai Idho Idho
2020	Soorarai Pottru	Pechi	Released on Amazon Prime
2020	Mookuthi Amman	Paalthangam	Released on Disney+ Hotstar
2020	Thiruvalar Panjangam	Interviewer	
2021	Murungakkai Chips	Shanthi's aunt	
2022	Idiot	Parimalam	
2022	Veetla Vishesham	Krishnaveni Unnikrishnan	
2023	Ghosty	Aadhi	
2023	Yosi	Doctor Sathya	
2023	Yaanai Mugathaan	Malliga	
2023	Kasethan Kadavulada	Sharadha	
2023	Appatha	Kannamma	Urvashi's 700th film
2024	J Baby	J Baby	
2024	Andhagan	Sarasu	
2024	Emakku Thozhil Romance	Bakkiyam	
2026	Parimala and Co	Sudhandhira	
2026	Mookuthi Amman 2	Maalamma	

==== Kannada films ====
List of Urvashi Kannada film credits
Year	Title	Role	Notes
1984	Shravana Banthu	Urvashi/Mary/Saraswathi	
1985	Naanu Nanna Hendthi	Urvashi	
1985	Shabash Vikram	Gayatri	
1986	Sathya Jyothi	Sujatha	
1986	Ee Jeeva Ninagagi	Rohini	
1987	Anthima Ghatta	Sunitha	
1987	Premaloka	Rohini	
1988	New Delhi	Uma	
1988	31 December	Radha	
1996	Jeevanadhi	Dr.Priyadarshini	
1999	Habba	Ambi's wife	
2000	Yaarige Saluthe Sambala	Suguna	
2001	Kothigalu Saar Kothigalu	Alamelu	
2003	Katthegalu Saar Katthegalu	Urmila	
2003	Vijaya Dashami	Parvathy	
2005	Rama Shama Bhama	Bhamamani	
2008	Nee Tata Naa Birla	Cook Draupathi	
2008	Arjun	Vishalakshi Jayasimha	
2009	Iniya	Kamala	
2009	Raaj the Showman	Herself	Special appearance
2010	Preethi Hangama	Police Inspector	
2012	Golmal Gayathri	Gayathri	
2014	Brahma	—	
2014	Oggarane	Beautician	
2015	Ram-Leela	Baby	
2016	Shivalinga	Anusooya	
2016	Jaggu Dada	Jaggu Dada's mother	
2018	Sur Sur Batti	Baddi Gowramma	
TBA	Rowdy Fellow		
TBA	Aba Jaba Daba		

==== Telugu films ====
List of Urvashi Telugu film credits
Year	Title	Role	Notes
1984	Rustum	Padma	
1984	Udhdhandudu		
1985	Kala Rudrudu		
1985	Bhale Thammudu	Latha	
1986	Jeevana Poratam	Mallika	
1986	Vetagallu	Radha	
1988	Anthima Theerpu	Uma	
1989	Chettu Kinda Pleader	Sujatha	
1998	Padutha Theeyaga	Durga	
1999	Mechanic Mavayya		
2000	Vijayaramaraju	Rani/Sirisha	
2002	Sandade Sandadi	Lakshmi	
2002	Allari Ramudu	Collector	
2004	Intlo Srimathi Veedhilo Kumari	Anjali Murthy	
2004	Swarabhishekam	Rukminiamma	
2005	Chakram	Lakshmi	
2010	Maro Charitra	Durga	
2014	Ulavacharu Biryani	Beautician	
2015	Jil	Jai's aunt	
2015	Size Zero	Rajeswari	
2016	Express Raja	Vasanthakokila	
2016	Sardaar Gabbar Singh	Madhumati	
2016	Manamantha	Lakshmi	
2019	Oh! Baby	Sulochana	
2019	Raju Gari Gadhi 3	Rajamatha	
2022	Aadavallu Meeku Johaarlu	Padmamma	
2023	Anni Manchi Sakunamule	Jagadamba	

==== Hindi films ====
List of Urvashi Hindi film credits
Year	Title	Role	Notes
1988	New Delhi	Uma	
1992	Azmaakar Dhekho	—	Unreleased

=== Voice credits ===
List of Urvashi film voice credits
Year	Title	Role	Voice to	Language
2002	Nandanam	Janaki	Kalarenjini	Malayalam
2010	Drohi	Shruthi	Poonam Bajwa	Tamil
2018	Itly	Lilly	Kalpana	Tamil

=== In other roles ===
List of Urvashi film credits in other roles
Year	Title	Role	Language	Notes
1992	Utsavamelam	Story Writer	Malayalam	
1994	Pidakkozhi Koovunna Noottandu	Story Writer	Malayalam	Producer
1994	Paatta Bhasthi	Story Writer	Malayalam	Telugu
1995	Mayabazaar 1995	Singer	Tamil	Song-"Oru Oorile"
2017	Magalir Mattum	Singer	Tamil	Song-"Carratu Pottazhaga"

== Television career ==
List of Urvashi television credits including reality / game shows and TV serials
Year	Program	Role	Channel	Language	Notes
	Asianet Channel	Promo anchor	Asianet	Malayalam	Ad
	Veetukku Veetukku Looty	Maya	Jaya TV	Tamil	Serial
1999	Panchami	Nirmala Joshi	Sun TV	Tamil	Horror Serial
2000	Dr. Vidya	Actress	DD Podhigai	Tamil	Serial
2001–2002	Atthamma	Annapoorani	Gemini TV	Telugu	Serial
2002	Take It Easy Urvashi	Anchor	Raj TV	Tamil	
2003	Bhagyalakshmi	Anchor	Kairali TV	Malayalam	
2006–2007	Swarnamazha	Anchor	Surya TV	Malayalam	
2007	Super Star Global	Judge	Amrita TV	Malayalam	
2007	Mega Thanga Vettai	Anchor	Sun TV	Tamil	Replaced Ramya Krishnan
2008–2011	Rani Maharani	Anchor	Surya TV	Malayalam	season 1–4
2010	Mammootty The Best Actor Award	Judge	Asianet	Malayalam	
2010	Munch Star singer Junior	Judge	Asianet	Malayalam	
2011	Bhima Jewels Comedy Festival	Judge	Mazhavil Manorama	Malayalam	
2011	Thiru Thirumathi	Anchor	Jaya TV	Tamil	
2012	Mummy & Me	Anchor	Surya TV	Malayalam	
2012–2013	Comedy Festival 2	Judge	Mazhavil Manorama	Malayalam	
2013, 2019	Comedy Stars	Judge	Asianet	Malayalam	
2013	Champions	Celebrity Judge	Surya TV	Malayalam	
2013–2014	Crazy Couple	Anchor	Zee Kannada	Kannada	
2014	Star Challenge	Participant	Surya TV	Malayalam	
2014	Back to School	Participant	Star Vijay	Tamil	
2015–2017	Jeevitham Sakshi	Anchor	Kairali TV	Malayalam	Replaced Sheela
2015–2016	Bhairavi Aavigalukku Priyamanaval	Komalla	Sun TV	Tamil	Serial
2016, 2018	Comedy Utsavam	Judge	Flowers TV	Malayalam	
2017	Komady Circus	Judge	Mazhavil Manorama	Malayalam	
2017	Laughing Villa Season 2	Judge	Surya TV	Malayalam	
2017	Vamsam	Sundari	Sun TV	Tamil	Serial
2018	Flowers Top Singer	Celebrity Judge	Flowers TV	Malayalam	
2018	Urvasi Theatres	Herself/Mentor	Asianet	Malayalam	
2018	Thakarppan Comedy	Judge	Mazhavil Manorama	Malayalam	
2019	Thirumanam	Marriage counselor	Colors Tamil	Tamil	Serial (Special appearance)
2020–2021	Comedy Stars Season 2	Judge	Asianet	Malayalam	
2022	Oru Chiri Iruchiri Bumper Chiri	Judge	Mazhavil Manorama	Malayalam	
2023	Entamma Superaa	Judge	Mazhavil Manorama	Malayalam	Grand finale jury

List of other Urvashi television show credits as guest
Year	Program	Channel	Language	Notes
	Alli Darbar	Kavithalaya	Tamil	
	Nere Chovve	Manorama News	Malayalam	
	Ennile Njan	ACV	Malayalam	
	Samagamam	Amrita TV	Malayalam	
2013	Jeevitham Ithuvare	Jaihind	Malayalam	
2017	Lal Salam	Amrita TV	Malayalam	
2017	JB Junction	Kairali TV	Malayalam	
2015, 2017	Comedy Super Nite	Flowers TV	Malayalam	
2017	Badai Bungalow	Asianet	Malayalam	
2018	Onnum Onnum Moonu	Mazhavil Manorama	Malayalam	
2018	Tharapakittu	Kaumudy TV	Malayalam	
2018	Morning Show	Media One	Malayalam	
2018	I Personally	Kappa TV	Malayalam	
2018	Aravindante Athithi Urvashi	Kairali We	Malayalam	
2019	Colors Comedy Nights	Colors Tamil	Tamil	
2019	Nalla Best Family	Flowers TV	Malayalam	
2020	Bigg Boss 4	Star Vijay	Tamil	Special wish video for Rekha in the opening episode
2024	Bigg Boss 6	Asianet	Malayalam	
2026	Comedy Cooks	Asianet	Malayalam	

== See also ==
- List of awards and nominations received by Urvashi
