= List of Malayalam films of 1985 =

The following is a list of Malayalam films released in the year 1985.

Opening		Sl. No.	Film	Cast	Director	Music director	Notes
J A N	1	1	Mutharamkunnu P.O.	Sukumari mukesh	Sibi Malayil	shyam	
J A N	4	2	Chillu Kottaram	Srividya, Sukumaran	K. G. Rajasekharan	A. T. Ummer	
J A N	4	3	Vellarikka Pattanam	Prem Nazir, Ratheesh	Thomas Berly	Thomas Berly	
J A N	11	4	Punnaram Cholli Cholli	Rahman, Zarina Wahab, Shankar	Priyadarshan	Jerry Amaldev	
J A N	11	5	Vellam	Prem Nazir, Madhu, K. R. Vijaya	Hariharan	G. Devarajan	
J A N	18	6	Kiraatham	Anuradha, Ratheesh	K. S. Gopalakrishnan	Kannur Rajan	
J A N	25	7	Avidathe Pole Ivideyum	Mammootty, Mohanlal	K. S. Sethumadhavan	M. K. Arjunan	
J A N	25	8	Ee Thanalil Ithiri Nerum	Mammootty, Shobhana	P. G. Vishwambharan	Shyam	
J A N	25	9	Muhurtham Pathnonnu Muppathinu	Mammootty, Ratheesh, Saritha	Joshiy	Shyam	
F E B	11	10	Eeran Sandhya	Mammootty, Shobhana, Rahman	Jeassy	V. S. Narasimhan	
F E B	12	11	Koodum Thedi	Mohanlal, Radhika, Rahman	Paul Babu	Jerry Amaldev	
F E B	12	12	Paara	Kalpana, Bheeman Raghu	Alleppey Ashraf	Kannur Rajan	
F E B	13	13	Manakkale Thatha	Nalinikanth, Jagathy Sreekumar	Babu Korula	A. T. Ummer	
F E B	15	14	Principal Olivil	Nedumudi Venu, Bharath Gopi, Jagathy Sreekumar	Gopikrishna	Alleppey Ranganath	
F E B	15	14	Choodatha Pookal	Ratheesh, Lakshmi	M. S. Baby	K. J. Joy	
F E B	15	15	Aazhi	Thilakan, Captain Raju	Boban Kunchacko	Raj Kamal	
F E B	21	16	Ente Ammu Ninte Thulasi Avarude Chakki	Balachandra Menon, Venu Nagavalli	Balachandra Menon	Kannur Rajan	
F E B	22	17	Makan Ente Makan	Mammootty, Radhika, T. G. Ravi	J. Sasikumar	Johnson	
F E B	26	18	Pacha Velicham	Madhu, Shankar	M. Mani	Shyam	
M A R	12	19	Nayakan	Mohanlal, Viji	Balu Kiriyath	A. T. Ummer	
M A R	15	20	Ottayan	Ratheesh, Sathaar	Crossbelt Mani	Guna Singh	
M A R	17	21	Sannaham	Prem Nazir, Ratheesh	Jose Kallen	Johnson	
M A R	22	22	Oduvil Kittiya Vartha	Mammootty, Nedumudi Venu	Yatheendra Das		
M A R	25	23	Manicheppu Thurannappol	Karthika, Thilakan	Balachandra Menon	Darsan Raman	
M A R	29	24	Onnanam Kunnil Oradi Kunnil	Shankar, Mohanlal	Priyadarshan	Raghu Kumar	
M A R	29	25	Anubandham	Mammootty, Seema, Mohanlal	I. V. Sasi	Shyam	
A P R	11	26	Ee Sabdam Innathe Sabdam	Mammootty, Shobana	P. G. Viswambaran	Shyam	
A P R	23	27	Madakkayathra		George Vettam	Alleppey Ranganath	
A P R	25	28	Ozhivukaalam	Prem Nazir, Srividya	Bharathan	Johnson	
A P R	26	29	Janakeeya Kodathi	Madhu, Srividya	Hassan	A. T. Ummer	
M A Y	1	30	Katha Ithuvare	Madhu, Mammootty	Joshiy	Johnson	
M A Y	7	31	Jeevante Jeevan	Mohanlal, Shalini	J. Williams	Shyam	
M A Y	8	32	Kannaram Pothi Pothi	Madhu, Srividya	Hassan	A. T. Ummer	
M A Y	9	33	Oru Sandesam Koodi	Prem Nazir(Guest role), Mammootty, Shankar	Cochin Haneefa	Shyam	
M A Y	12	34	Ormikkaan Omanikkaan	Mohanlal, Santhosh	A. B. Raj	Raveendran	
M A Y	17	35	Madhuvidhu Theerum Mumbe	Prem Nazir, Devan	K. Ramachandran	K. J. Joy	
M A Y	28	36	Ithu Nalla Thamasha	Santhosh, Jagathy Sreekumar	Kailasnath	K. P. Udayabhanu	
J U N	3	37	Onathumbikkoru Oonjaal	Bharath Gopi, Rameswari	N. P. Suresh	A. T. Ummer	
J U N	13	38	Nerariyum Nerathu	Prem Nazir, Shankar	Salaam Chembazhanthy	Johnson	
J U N	14	39	Manya Mahajanangale	Mammootty, Chithra	A. T. Abu	Shyam	
J U N	20	40	Onningu Vannengil	Mammootty, Shankar, Nadia Moidu	Joshiy	Shyam	
J U N	20	41	Bindhu		Mookkannoor Sebastian	Reuben	
J U N	28	42	Oru Nokku Kanan	Mammootty, Ambika, Shankar	Sajan	Shyam	
J U L	2	43	Scene No. 7	Thilakan, Ashokan	Ambili	Jerry Amaldev	
J U L	5	44	Ayanum	Madhu, Srividya	Harikumar	M. B. Sreenivasan	
J U L	5	45	Angadikkappurathu	Mohanlal, Mammootty	I. V. Sasi	Shyam	
J U L	7	46	Mottu	Vijayaraghavan,	Joy		
J U L	8	47	Naavadakku Paniyedukku	Baby Kala, P. C. George	A. R. Rajan	V. Dakshinamoorthy	
J U L	8	48	Akkacheyude Kunjuvava	Shobhana, Ratheesh	Sajan	Johnson	
J U L	14	49	Rangam	Mohanlal, Shobhana	I. V. Sasi	K. V. Mahadevan	
J U L	18	50	Snehicha Kuttathinu	Prem Nazir, Ratheesh	P. K. Joseph	A. T. Ummer	
J U L	25	51	Ente Kaanakkuyil	Mammootty, Rahman, Revathi	J. Sasikumar	Johnson	
J U L	26	52	Ezhu Muthal Onpathu Vare	Mohanlal, Ratheesh	J. Sasikumar	K. J. Joy	
A U G	2	53	Puzhayozhukum Vazhi	Mammootty, Jagathy Sreekumar	M. Krishnan Nair	Raveendran	
A U G	8	54	Purooruvase	Varanasi Narayanan Nampoothiri	Prof. Sivaprasad	Anand Sankar	
A U G	9	55	Aram + Aram = Kinnaram	Mohanlal, Shankar Panicker, Sukumari	Priyadarshan		
A U G	12	56	Mulamoottil Adima	Mohanlal, Aruna	P. K. Joseph	M. K. Arjunan	
A U G	14	57	Ivide Ee Theerathu	Madhu, Srividya	P. G. Vishwambharan	A. T. Ummer	
A U G	15	58	Orikkal Oridathu	Rahman, Rohini	Jeassy	Raveendran	
A U G	15	59	Aarodum Parayaruthu	Rohini, Shankar	A. J. Rojas	P. C. Susi	
A U G	18	60	Onnam Prathi Olivil	Rahman, Shanavas	Baby	K. J. Joy	
A U G	22	61	Iniyum Kadha Thudarum	Mammootty, Thilakan	Joshiy	Shyam	
A U G	23	62	Idanilangal	Mohanlal, Mammootty, Sukumari	I. V. Sasi	M. S. Viswanathan	
A U G	24	63	Chorakku Chora	Jagathy Sreekumar, Ratheesh	Crossbelt Mani	Guna Singh	
S E P	1	64	Boeing Boeing	Mohanlal, Mukesh, Sukumari	Priyadarshan	Reghu Kumar	
S E P	5	65	Akkare Ninnoru Maran	Nedumudi Venu, Maniyanpilla Raju, Sukumari	Girish	Kannur Rajan	
S E P	12	67	Nirakkoottu	Mammootty, Urvashi	Joshiy	Shyam	
S E P	12	68	Oru Naal Innoru Naal	Prem Nazir, Ratheesh	T. S. Suresh Babu	M. G. Radhakrishnan	
S E P	14	69	Njan Piranna Nattil	Mohanlal, Aruna	P. Chandrakumar	A. T. Ummer	
S E P	17	70	Irakal	Ganesh Kumar, Thilakan	K. G. George	M. B. Sreenivasan	
S E P	20	71	Yathra	Mammootty, Shobhana	Balu Mahendra	Ilaiyaraaja	
S E P	25	72	Ee Lokam Evide Kure Manushyar	Mammootty, Rahman, Rohini,	P. G. Vishwambharan	Shyam	
S E P	27	73	Adhyayam Onnu Muthal	Madhavi, Mohanlal, Sukumari	Sathyan Anthikad	Jerry Amaldev	
O C T	4	74	Saandham Bheekaram	Shankar, Ratheesh	Rajasenan	Shyam	
O C T	5	75	Black Mail	Ratheesh, Sathaar	Crossbelt Mani	Guna Singh	
O C T	11	76	Kaanathaya Penkutty	Jayabharathi, Bharath Gopi	K. N. Sasidharan	Jerry Amaldev	
O C T	14	77	Ee Thalamura Ingane	Menaka, Prathapachandran	Rochy Alex	G. Devarajan	
O C T	14	78	Pournami Raavil 3D	Viji, Vijayendra	A. Vincent	Shankar–Ganesh	
O C T	18	79	Vilichu Vilikettu	Mammootty, Shubha	Sreekumaran Thampi	Raveendran	
O C T	24	80	Nulli Novikkathe	Balan K. Nair, Madhuri	Mohan Roop	Rajamani	
O C T	26	81	Nokkethadhoorathu Kannum Nattu	Mohanlal, Padmini, Nadia Moidu	Fazil	Jerry Amaldev	
N O V	1	82	Aanakkorumma	Adoor Bhasi, Ratheesh	M. Mani	Shyam	
N O V	1	83	Puli Varunne Puli	Mammootty, Nedumudi Venu, Sukumari	Harikumar	Jerry Amaldev	
N O V	1	84	Aa Neram Alppa Dooram	Mammootty, Jose Prakash	Thampi Kannanthanam	Johnson	
N O V	1	85	Gaayathridevi Ente Amma	Rahman, Bharath Gopi, Sukumari	Sathyan Anthikkad	Shyam	
N O V	1	86	Aa Penkutty Nee Aayirunnenkil	Ramachandran, Jagathy Sreekumar	Stanley Jose	S. D. Sekhar	
N O V	2	87	Sammelanam	Shankar, Menaka	C. P. Vijayakumar	Maharaja	
N O V	5	88	Kaiyum Thlayum Purathidaruthe	Mukesh, Devan	Nagavally R. S. Kurup	Raveendran	
N O V	9	89	Guruji Oru Vakku	Madhu, Mohanlal, Ratheesh	Rajan Sankaradi	Jerry Amaldev	
N O V	10	90	Vasantha Sena	Shankar, Seema, Sukumari	K. Vijayan	Shyam	
N O V	14	91	Karimpinpoovinakkare	Mammootty, Mohanlal, Sukumari	I. V. Sasi	Shyam	
N O V	14	92	Upaharam	Sukumari, Srividya	Sajan	Johnson	
N O V	15	93	Kathodu Kathoram	Mammootty, Nedumudi Venu	Bharathan	Ouseppachan	
N O V	15	94	Shathru	Ratheesh, Anuradha	T. S. Mohan	A. T. Ummer	
N O V	17	95	Azhiyatha Bandhangal	Mohanlal, Shobhana	J. Sasikumar	Shyam	
N O V	20	96	Uyarum Njan Nadake	Mohanlal, Aruna	P. Chandrakumar	K. P. N. Pillai	
N O V	21	97	Parayanumvayya Parayathirikkanumvayya	Mammootty, Shankar, Sukumari	Priyadarshan	M. G. Radhakrishnan	
N O V	21	98	Uyirthezhunnelppu	Prem Nazir, Hari	N. P. Suresh	A. T. Ummer	
N O V	21	99	Vannu Kandu Keezhadakki	Shankar Panicker, Nadia Moidu	Joshiy	Shyam	
D E C	1	100	Thinkalaazhcha Nalla Divasam	Kaviyoor Ponnamma, Mammootty	P. Padmarajan	Shyam	
D E C	2	101	Mukhyamanthri	Prem Nazir, Srividya, Sukumari	Alleppey Ashraf	Kumarakam Rajappan	
D E C	7	102	Revenge	Ratheesh, Sathaar	Crossbelt Mani	Guna Singh	
D E C	9	103	Oru Kudakeezhil	Sukumari, Thilakan	Joshiy	Johnson	
D E C	12	104	Pournami Rathriyil		Viji Sreekumar	Raveendran	
D E C	20	105	Guerrilla		K. S. Gopalakrishnan	K. J. Joy	
D E C	21	106	Archana Aaradhana	Shankar Panicker, Menaka, Sukumari	Sajan	Shyam	
D E C	21	107	Akalathe Ambili	Mammootty, Rohini	Jeassy	Shyam	
D E C	21	108	Dheivatheyorthu	Prem Nazir, Srividya	R. Gopi	M. G. Radhakrishnan	
D E C	21	109	Kandu Kandarinju	Mammootty, Mohanlal, Sukumari	Sajan	Shyam	
			Thammil Thammil	Sukumari			
			Soundaryappinakkam				
			Pathamudayam				
			Mounanombaram	Shankar, Ratheesh Sukumari			
			Ambada Njaane!				
			Samantharam				
			Thozhil Allengil Jail				
			Premalekhanam				

== Dubbed films ==
Opening	Title	Director(s)	Original film		Cast	Ref.
Opening	Title	Director(s)	Film	Language	Cast	Ref.
	Mayuri	Sangitham Srinivasan				
	Ente Ponnumol	K. Vijayan				
	Dhoomam					
	Mathrubhhomikku Vendi	Crossbelt Mani				
	Hero Boy	Kranthi Kumar				
	Njangal Jayikkum Njangal Bharikum	V. Somasekhar				
	Adarkkalam	Rajendra Babu				
	Jai Vethlam (3D)	Vitalacharya				
	Raagam Anantha Bairavi	Jandhyala				
	Kattu Rani	A. T. Reghu				
	Aadhiyugam	Prasad				
4 September	Prathikara Jwala	P. Ravi Raja	Jwala	Telugu	Radhika, Chiranjeevi	
