= List of awards and nominations received by Urvashi =

Kavitha Ranjini, known by the stage name Urvashi, is an Indian actress, dubbing artist, television host, scriptwriter and producer known for her works in the Southern film industry, predominantly in Malayalam and Tamil films. She has acted in around 700 films.

She started her acting career as a child artist, in a Malayalam movie Vidarunna Mottukal, released in 1977. Her first released film as heroine was Mundhanai Mudichu (Tamil, directed by K. Bhagyaraj) in 1983. She was a prominent lead actress of the 1980s and 1990s, primarily in Malayalam Films. She has written the films Ulsavamelam and Pidakkozhi Koovunna Noottandu, the latter was also produced by her. She has won the National Film Award for Best Supporting Actress twice: first for her role in Achuvinte Amma (2005), which marked her return to cinema after a six-year break, and again for her performance in Ullozhukku (2024). She has won the Kerala State Film Award for Best Actress a record six times, which includes three consecutive wins from 1989 to 1991. She has also received three Tamil Nadu State Film Awards.

Urvashi was born to popular drama actors Chavara V. P. Nair and Vijayalakshmi in Sooranad in Kollam district of Kerala .Her elder sisters are actors Kalaranjini and Kalpana. She married actor Manoj K. Jayan on 2 May 1998, which ended in divorce in 2008.

== National Film Awards ==
Year	Category	Film	Result
2005	Best Supporting Actress	Achuvinte Amma	Won
2023	Best Supporting Actress	Ullozhukku	Won

== Kerala State Film Awards ==
Year	Category	Film	Result
1989	Best Actress	Mazhavil Kavadi, Varthamanakalam	Won
1990	Best Actress	Thalayanamanthram	Won
1991	Best Actress	Bharatham, Mukha Chithram, Kakkathollayiram, Kadinjool Kalyanam	Won
1995	Best Actress	Kazhakam	Won
2006	Best Actress	Madhuchandralekha	Won
2023	Best Actress	Ullozhukku	Won

== Tamil Nadu State Film Awards ==
Year	Category	Film	Result
1994	Tamil Nadu State Film Award Special Prize	Magalir Mattum	Won
1995	Tamil Nadu State Film Honorary Kalaivanar Award	Contributions to Various Tamil films	Won
2017	Tamil Nadu State Film Award for Best Comedy Actress	Magalir Mattum	Won

== Filmfare Awards South ==
Year	Category	Film	Result
1983	Filmfare Award for New Face - Tamil	Mundhanai Mudichu	Won
1983	Filmfare Award for Best Actress – Tamil	Mundhanai Mudichu	Nominated
1990	Filmfare Award for Best Actress – Tamil	Michael Madana Kama Rajan	Nominated
1994	Filmfare Award for Best Actress – Tamil	Magalir Mattum	Nominated
1996	Filmfare Award for Best Actress – Tamil	Irattai Roja	Nominated
2010	Filmfare Award for Best Supporting Actress - Malayalam	Mummy & Me	Won
2018	Filmfare Award for Best Supporting Actress – Tamil	Magalir Mattum	Nominated
2021	Filmfare Award for Best Supporting Actress – Tamil	Soorarai Pottru	Won
2022	Filmfare Award for Best Supporting Actress – Tamil	Veetla Vishesham	Won
2024	Filmfare Award for Best Actress – Tamil	J Baby	Nominated
2024	Filmfare Award for Best Actress – Malayalam	Ullozhukku	Won

== Kerala Film Critics Association Awards ==
Year	Category	Film	Result
1990	Best Actress	Thalayanamanthram,Thoovalsparsham	Won
1991	Best Actress	Kakkathollayiram,Mukha Chithram	Won
2022	Chalachithra Prathibha Puraskaram	Contribution to Malayalam Film Industry	Won

== Vanitha Film Awards ==
Year	Category	Film	Result
2019	Best Actress-Special Performance	Aravindante Athidhikal, Ente Ummante Peru	Won

== Asianet Film Awards ==
Year	Category	Film	Result
2019	Best Actress-Special Jury Award	Aravindante Athidhikal, Ente Ummante Peru	Won

== South Indian International Movie Awards ==
Year	Category	Film	Result
2019	Best Actress in a Supporting Role (Malayalam)	Aravindante Athidhikal	Nominated
2020	Best Actress in a Supporting Role (Malayalam)	Varane Avashyamund	Nominated
2020	Best Actress in a Supporting Role (Tamil)	Soorarai Pottru	Nominated
2020	Best Actress in a Comedy (Tamil)	Mookuthi Amman	Nominated
2024	Best Actress (Malayalam)	Ullozhukku	Won
2024	Best Actress (Tamil)	J Baby	Nominated

== Ananda Vikatan Cinema Awards ==
Year	Category	Film	Result
2007	Best Actress in a Comedy (Tamil)	Malaikottai	Won
2017	Best Actress in a Comedy (Tamil)	Magalir Mattum	Won
2020	Best Actress in a Comedy (Tamil)	Dhilluku Dhuddu 2	Won
2020	Aval Awards for Evergreen Heroine-2021	Soorarai Pottru, Mookuthi Amman , Putham Pudhu Kaalai	Won
2020-21	Best Supporting Actress	Soorarai Pottru	Won

== Amrita Film Awards ==
- 2005: Best Supporting Actress- Achuvinte Amma

== Other Film Awards ==
- 1983: Best New face Madras Telugu Film Academy Award - Mundhanai Mudichu (Tamil)
- 1984: Savithry Award for Best Actress - Mundhanai Mudichu
- 1993: Woman of the Year Award By Film Fans Association for various films
- 2005: Best Actress Award by Film Fans Association - Achuvinte Amma
- 2009: Edison Awards (India) for Best Character (Female) - Siva Manasula Sakthi
- 2010: Jaihind TV Special Award for Best Actress - Mummy & Me
- 2010: Jayan Smaraka Award for Best Actress - Mummy & Me & Sakudumbam Shyamala
- 2019: Creative Film Awards - Best supporting actress -Ente Ummante Peru
- 2021: Women Achievers Awards
- 2023: 7th Malayalam Film Awards- Best Actress -Jaladhara Pumpset Since 1962
- 2024: Mazhavil Entertainment Awards- Master Entertainer (Actor)
