= Akkare Ninnoru Maran =

1985 film

- Directed by: Girish
- Screenplay by: Sreenivasan
- Story by: Jagadish
- Produced by: G. Suresh Kumar; Sanal Kumar
- Starring: Maniyanpilla Raju; Menaka; Sukumari; Innocent
- Cinematography: S. Kumar
- Edited by: N. Gopalakrishnan
- Music by: Kannur Rajan (Songs); C. Rajamani (Score)
- Production company: Sooryodaya Creations
- Distributed by: Evershine
- Release date: 5 September 1985
- Country: India
- Language: Malayalam

Akkare Ninnoru Maran (transl. A groom from abroad) is a 1985 Indian Malayalam-language comedy film directed by Girish and written by Sreenivasan from a story by Jagadish, it was produced by G. Suresh Kumar and Sanal Kumar. The film stars Maniyanpilla Raju, Menaka, Sukumari and Innocent. The film has musical score by C. Rajamani and songs by Kannur Rajan.

== Plot ==
K. P. Thankappan Nair is a rich man, who has cheated his sister out of her property. Her son Achuthan wants to reclaim the land forcibly taken by his uncle, as well as marry his daughter, Nandini, with whom he is in love. He and his friends hatch a plan to hoodwink Thankappan Nair, pretending to have earned a fortune working in Dubai.

== Cast ==
- Maniyanpilla Raju as Achuthan
- Menaka as Nandini
- Mukesh as Pavithran
- Jagadish as Vishwan
- Nedumudi Venu as K. P. Thankappan Nair
- Sukumari as Savithri, Achuthan's mother
- Innocent as Sankaran, Pavithran's father
- Sreenivasan as Ali Koya, the lodge owner who appears in various disguises like Arab businessman / Menon from Kottayam / Police Officer in front of Nair.
- Poojappura Ravi as Kannaran, bus driver
- Lalithasree as Pavithran's mother
- Bobby Kottarakkara as Musician
- Mala Aravindan as Raghavan, bus conductor in K. P. Transport
- Thodupuzha Vasanthi as Ammayi
- C. I. Paul as groom's father

== Production ==
Gireesh, who was working as an associate director to Priyadarshan was contacted by Anand, who produced the movie Parayanum Vayya Parayathirikkanum Vayya and expressed his interest in producing a movie with Gireesh as director. Later, Anand dropped the project. However, Gireesh secured another producer with help from a few friends. Shooting was completed in 26 days in and around Palakkad and Thiruvilwamala.

== Soundtrack ==
The music was composed by Kannur Rajan and the lyrics were written by Priyadarshan.

No.	Song	Singers	Lyrics	Length (m:ss)
1	"Kannanee Bhoomiyil" (Anchara Ekkar)	K. P. Brahmanandan, Chorus, Satheesh Babu	Priyadarshan	

== Release ==
This film was released on 5 September 1985.

== Box office ==
The film was critically well received and was a box office hit.

== Legacy ==
There were some comedic dialogues in the film which became catchphrases, such as in the Arabic translation scene in the film.
