= Paara (film) =

- Directed by: Alleppey Ashraf
- Written by: Alleppey Ashraf
- Screenplay by: Alleppey Ashraf
- Produced by: Alleppey Ashraf
- Starring: Kalpana; Bheeman Raghu; Sukumari; Jagathy Sreekumar
- Cinematography: Dinesh Babu
- Edited by: L. Bhoominathan
- Music by: Kannur Rajan
- Production company: Indukala
- Distributed by: Indukala
- Release date: 12 February 1985
- Country: India
- Language: Malayalam

Paara is a 1985 Indian Malayalam-language film, directed and produced by Alleppey Ashraf. The film stars Kalpana, Bheeman Raghu, Sukumari, K P Natarajan and Jagathy Sreekumar. The film has musical score by Kannur Rajan.

== Cast ==
- Kalpana
- Bheeman Raghu
- Sukumari
- Jagathy Sreekumar
- Anuradha
- Babitha Justin
- Kundara Johny
- Kuthiravattam Pappu
- Madhu Attukal
- Santhakumari

== Soundtrack ==
The music was composed by Kannur Rajan with lyrics by Ilanthoor Vijayakumar and Vijayan.

No.	Song	Singers	Lyrics	Length (m:ss)
1	"Aruvikal Olam"	Ilaiyaraaja, Chorus	Ilanthoor Vijayakumar	
2	"Ee Kaadaake Pookkal"	Vani Jairam	Vijayan	
3	"Unmaada Raavil"	Vani Jairam	Ilanthoor Vijayakumar	
