= Nalinikanth =

Indian actor

- Born: Chennai, Tamil Nadu, India
- Occupation: Actor
- Years active: 1979–present
- Television: Marmadesam
- Spouse: Shantha
- Children: 2

Nalinikanth is an Indian actor known for his works predominantly in Tamil, Telugu, and Malayalam films. He debuted in the 1979 movie Rangoon Rowdy and has appeared in over 100 films. Nalinikanth was once a popular villainy actor. He resembles Rajinikanth. His notable movies such as Mundhanai Mudichu, Raasukutti, Mangamma Sapatham, Rudhra, Puthupatti Ponnuthaye, Enga Muthalali, Raja Enga Raja, and Yaamirukka Bayamey.

== Career ==
Nalinikanth was introduced in Telugu cinema by director Dasari Narayana Rao. His debut movie was Rangoon Rowdy released in 1979. He has acted as hero such as Azhaithal Varuven and Idhayam Pesugirathu. He did 35 films in Telugu as well. He was given some notable roles in the films of Bhagyaraj. He acted as a villain in many films.

As his acting career in the films did not give a helping hand to come up high, he changed his path in producing serials. He produced many Tamil and Telugu serials for Sun TV, Vijay TV, Gemini TV and Maa TV.

== Television ==
Year	Title	Role	Language	Channel
1996	Marmadesam	Annamalai	Tamil	Sun TV
2021–2023	Kaatrukkena Veli	Varadharajan	Tamil	Star Vijay
2022	Mandhira Punnagai	Ramaiya	Tamil	Colors Tamil
2024	Panivizhum Malarvanam	Parameswaran	Tamil	Star Vijay

== Filmography ==
This is a partial filmography. You can expand it.

=== Tamil films ===
- Kadhal Kadhal Kadhal (1980)
- Azhaithal Varuven (1980)
- Devi Dharisanam (1980)
- Sathya Sundharam (1981)
- Engamma Maharani (1981)
- Idhayam Pesugirathu (1982)
- Vaazhvey Maayam (1982)
- Mundhanai Mudichu (1983)
- Niraparaadhi (1984)
- Then Sittukkal (1984)
- Sivappu Nila (1985)
- Viswanathan Velai Venum (1985) as Kishore
- Mangamma Sapatham (1985) as Jaipal
- Amman Kovil Kizhakale (1986)
- Chellakutti (1986)
- Dravidan (1989)
- Pathimoonam Number Veedu (1990)
- Rudhra (1991)
- Rasukutty (1992) as Chinnapannai
- Abhirami (1992)
- Natchathira Nayagan (1992)
- Walter Vetrivel (1993)
- Enga Muthalali (1993)
- Puthupatti Ponnuthaye (1994)
- Thamarai (1994)
- Pudhiya Mannargal (1994) as Chitti Babu
- Oru Oorla Oru Rajakumari (1995)
- Thamizhachi (1995)
- Raja Enga Raja (1995)
- Thambi Durai (1997)
- Desiya Geetham (1998)
- Kadhalil Vizhunthen (2008) as Doctor
- Yaamirukka Bayamey (2014) as Old Thamizh
- Kaththi (2014) as Old Villager
- Annadurai (2017) as Annadurai and Thambidurai's father
- Gulaebaghavali (2018) as Sampath's father
- Chiyangal (2020)
- Thunivu (2023) as Customer

=== Telugu films ===
Year	Film	Role	Notes
1979	Rangoon Rowdy	Nalinikant	
1979	Srungara Ramudu	Pratap	
1982	Balidanam		
1982	Poola Pallaki		
1983	Chandirani		
1983	Moodu Mullu	Ratnam	
1984	Tandava Krishnudu	Varma	
1985	Dampatyam		
1985	Paripoyina Khaideelu		
1988	Nyayam Kosam	Vasu	
1990	Raja Vikramarka		
1990	Sahasa Putrudu		
1994	M. Dharmaraju M.A.		

=== Other language films ===
Year	Film	Role	Language	Notes
1984	Vanitha Police		Malayalam	
1985	Manakkale Thatha		Malayalam	
2014	Namo Bhootatma		Kannada	
