= Ninnishtam Ennishtam 2 =

- Film poster
- Directed by: Alleppey Ashraf
- Written by: Aleppey Ashraf
- Produced by: K. Mohanlal
- Starring: Suresh Nair; Sunitha; Priya
- Cinematography: Anandakuttan
- Music by: Dr. P.V Ranjith
- Distributed by: Star Tale Visual Media
- Release date: 28 July 2011
- Country: India
- Language: Malayalam

Ninnishtam Ennishtam 2 is a 2011 Malayalam-language romance film directed by Alleppey Ashraf, starring newcomers Suresh and Sunitha . It is a sequel to the 1986 film Ninnishtam Ennishtam.

== Plot ==
The film is a sequel to Ninnishtam Ennishtam and the story takes place 25 years from where the first film finished. Sreekuttan, who is the nephew of the original Sreekuttan played by Mohanlal in the original comes to Thiruvananthapuram city and accidentally meets the daughter of Chikku, the lover of old Sreekkuttan, and falls in love. How the identity of the characters get revealed and the ultimate success of the new story forms the rest of the film.

== Cast ==
- Suresh Nair as Sreekumar (Sreekuttan)
- Sunitha as Sreelekha (Chikku)
- Priya as Shalini (Chikku)
- Jagathy Sreekumar as Kurup
- Mukesh as Ramakrishna Pillai, Shalini's husband
- Suraj Venjarammoodu as Sundareshan, Kumaran's son
- Sukumari as Kakkathiyamma, Kurup's mother-in-Law
- Kalaranjini as Sreekuttan's mother
- Kalpana as Muthulakshmi, Kakkathiyamma's daughter
- Kundara Johny as Achu, Shalini's brother
- Bheeman Raghu as SI Brucelee
- N. L. Balakrishnan as Sankunni
- Kochu Preman as Kochu Govindan
- Santhakumari as Shalini's House Servant
- Krishnaprasad as Deepak
- Ashkar Saudan as Kishore, Achu's son
- Prasanth Kanjiramattom as Harris
- Mohanlal as Sreekuttan (Archive Footage)
- Kuthiravattam Pappu as Thirukkuthu Kumaran (Archive Footage)
- Bobby Kottarakkara as Tea Shop Owner (Archive Footage)
- Sreenivasan
- Achu
- Poojappura Ravi
- Kottayam Somaraj

== Reception ==
The film was a failure at the Kerala box-office. It received generally negative reviews from critics. Nowrunning.com gave the film a rating of, criticising it as "adding a bad name to sequel films". Oneindia.in gave the film a rating of. Indiaglitz.com gave the film a rating of, criticising it as "poor in content". Bharatstudent site gave the film a rating of (1.25/5), observing that the film has a thoughtless storyline with a poor presentation.
