= Poo Vaasam =

- Directed by: Sree Bharathi
- Written by: Sree Bharathi
- Produced by: RVR; Hari Haran
- Starring: Murali; Ramya; Jaishankar
- Cinematography: T. N. Kanagaraj
- Edited by: P. K. Mohan
- Music by: Ganesh
- Production company: Sri Suyambalainga Swamy Films
- Release date: 19 March 1999
- Country: India
- Language: Tamil

Poo Vaasam (transl. Fragrance of flower) is a 1999 Indian Tamil-language drama film, directed by Sreebharathi and produced by RVR. The film stars Murali, Ramya and Jaishankar, while Radharavi and Vinu Chakravarthy portrayed supporting roles. The music for the film was composed by Ganesh and the film had a delayed release on 19 March 1999.

== Cast ==
- Murali
- Ramya
- Jaishankar
- Vinu Chakravarthy
- Radharavi
- Pushpalatha
- Sridivya
- RVR
- Loose Mohan
- Thavakalai Chittibabu
- Usilai Mani
- Kumarimuthu

== Production ==
The film marked the only production of producer R. Kalanjiam alias RVR, the father of actor-producer R. K. Suresh. Delays during production meant that the film was only released in 1999 despite being launched prior to Idhayam (1991).

== Soundtrack ==
The music was composed by Ganesh.

No.	Title	Length
1.	"Devan Kovil"	04:11
2.	"Kadaloram Pona"	05:26
3.	"Rotoram Veetukari"	04:35
4.	"Yeri Pochuthe Bothai"	04:19

== Legacy ==
In 2021, a writer from Cine Samugam wrote that this film, alongside Poovilangu (1984), Idhayam (1991), Aanandham (2001) and Pasakiligal (2006) has kept Murali in our minds.
