= K. T. C. Abdullah =

Indian actor (1936–2018)

K.T.C. Abdullah
- Born: Abdullah; 1936; Palayam, Kozhikode, Kerala, British India
- Died: 17 November 2018 (aged 81–82)
- Occupation: Actor
- Years active: 1977–2018

K. T. C. Abdullah or Abdullah (1936 – 17 November 2018) was an Indian actor on stage who performed in a few notable Malayalam films.

== Early life ==
Abdullah was born in 1936 in Palayam, Kozhikode, Kerala, British India. He made his screen debut in 1977 with Dweepu, directed by Ramu Kariat. He went on to act in over 35 films. His last scene was in the critically acclaimed Sudani from Nigeria in 2018.

== Death ==
Abdullah died in Kozhikode, Kerala on 17 November 2018.

== Career ==
As a stage performer, Abdullah worked in a private firm called KTC, later with the title KTC Abdullah.

== Filmography ==
Year	Title	Role
1981	Ahimsa	Avukkar
1982	Chiriyo Chiri	Worker in a tea shop at night
1984	Ithiri Poove Chuvannapoove	One amongst the street drama
1985	Ozhivukalam	Paili Chettan
1986	Vartha	
1991	Ennum Nanmakal	Patient
2006	Yes Your Honour	
2007	Arabikkatha	Abdullah / Ikka
2013	Neelakasham Pachakadal Chuvanna Bhoomi	
2015	Ivan Maryadaraman	
2016	Kavi Uddheshichathu..?	Umbayikka
2018	Sudani from Nigeria	Puthiyappla
2019	Vaarikkuzhiyile Kolapathakam	Tailor
