= Ninnistham Ennishtam =

- Poster
- Directed by: Alleppey Ashraf
- Written by: Priyadarshan
- Based on: City Lights by Charlie Chaplin
- Starring: Mohanlal; Priya; Sukumari; Jagathy Sreekumar
- Cinematography: S. Kumar
- Edited by: N. Gopalakrishnan
- Music by: Kannur Rajan
- Production company: Parambi Pictures
- Distributed by: Parambi Pictures
- Release date: 7 October 1986
- Country: India
- Language: Malayalam

Ninnistham Ennishtam is a 1986 Indian Malayalam-language film, directed by Alleppey Ashraf. The film stars Mohanlal, Priya, Sukumari and Jagathy Sreekumar . The film has musical score by Kannur Rajan. This is remake of Charlie Chaplin's movie City Lights. Alleppey Ashraf later directed a Tamil remake titled Neela Kuyil (1995), starring Pandiarajan.

== Cast ==
- Mohanlal as Sreekuttan
- Priya as Shalini / Chikku
- Sukumari as Kakkathiyamma
- Jagathy Sreekumar as Kurup
- Mukesh as Ramakrishna Pillai
- Sankaradi as doctor
- Sreenivasan as Jithinlal-Madanlal
- Kundara Johny as Achu
- Kuthiravattam Pappu as Thirukkuthu Kumaran
- Lalithasree
- Mala Aravindan as Chakrapani
- Poojappura Ravi
- Thodupuzha Vasanthi
- Kavara Sasankan
- JP Jayakumar as Cheruplasheri Krishnan Nair.

== Soundtrack ==
The music was composed by Kannur Rajan and the lyrics were written by Mankombu Gopalakrishnan.

No.	Song	Singers	Lyrics
1	"Ilam Manjin Kulirumayoru" (D)	K. J. Yesudas, S. Janaki	Mankombu Gopalakrishnan
2	"Ilam Manjin Kulirumayoru" (M) (D)	K. J. Yesudas, S. Janaki	Mankombu Gopalakrishnan
3	"Naadangalaay Neevaroo"	K. S. Chithra, P. Jayachandran	Mankombu Gopalakrishnan
4	"Thumappookkaatil"	K. S. Chithra, P. Jayachandran	Mankombu Gopalakrishnan

== Sequel ==
A sequel to the film named Ninnishtam Ennishtam 2 directed by Alleppey Ashraf himself was released on 28 July 2011.
