= Chakkikotha Chankaran =

- Poster
- Directed by: Krishnakumar
- Written by: VR Gopalakrishnan
- Produced by: GoodKnight Films
- Starring: Jayaram; Nedumudi Venu; Urvashi; Geetha; Thilakan; Sukumari
- Cinematography: Vijayakumar
- Edited by: A. Paul Durai Singham
- Music by: Shankar–Ganesh
- Release date: 1989
- Country: India
- Language: Malayalam

Chakkikotha Chankaran is 1989 Indian Malayalam-language comedy film, directed by Krishnakumar, starring Jayaram and Urvashi. The film was a remake of Tamil film Enga Veetu Ramayanam. The movie was remade in Kannada as Mana Mecchida Sose.

== Plot ==
The film begins with Pradeep enjoying a cricket match. His parents, Raghavan Thampi and Subhadra, are eager to find brides for their sons, Prabhakaran and Pradeep, after an astrologer warns that they must have a grandchild soon, or one of them may die. Prabhakaran, determined to become a skilled Mridangam player, goes against his family's wishes, while Pradeep works as a bank employee.

Subhadra, frustrated with Prabhakaran's refusal to marry Shailaja, the daughter of Madhava Menon, attempts suicide in front of him. Feeling pressured, Prabhakaran agrees to the marriage. However, after the wedding, he constantly criticizes Shailaja for minor mistakes. One day, urged by his parents, Prabhakaran takes Shailaja out to a movie. On the way, they are harassed by some local troublemakers. Though Prabhakaran tries to avoid confrontation, the insults become too much for Shailaja to bear. To Prabhakaran's surprise, Shailaja, a skilled Karate practitioner, fights off the attackers, leaving him in awe of her abilities. Later, when Prabhakaran asks her where she learned Karate, she explains that she was trained as a child. That night, Shailaja has a nightmare about the same attackers hurting her husband, and in her sleep, she accidentally punches him.

Meanwhile, Pradeep falls in love with Roshini, and they secretly marry in a temple to avoid upsetting his family. It turns out Roshini and Shailaja are old friends, so Roshini brings Pradeep to live in his family home without revealing their marriage. Pradeep tries to leave the house multiple times, but his brother convinces him to stay. Prabhakaran hatches a plan to frame Roshini as a thief, hoping to get her thrown out, but it backfires, and he ends up getting arrested. He is later released when the real thief confesses to the crime.

In the film's climax, Roshini is kidnapped by her stalker, and Pradeep attempts to rescue her. Both are caught by the police, leading the entire family to the police station to secure their release. While there, captured criminals are brought in, and one of them takes Shailaja hostage. Shailaja once again uses her Karate skills to overpower the goons. In the chaos, a bomb goes off at the police station, but the family manages to escape unharmed.

== Cast ==
- Jayaram as Pradeep Thampi
- Nedumudi Venu as Prabhakaran Thampi
- Thilakan as Raghavan Thampi
- Urvashi as Roshney
- Geetha as Shailaja
- Sukumari as Subhadra Kunjamma
- Jagathi Sreekumar as Ouseppu
- Kalamandalam Chinnu as Ouseppu love interest
- Jose as Wilson
- Adoor Bhasi as Madhava Menon
- Kunchan as Police Officer
- Bobby Kottarakkara as Sankara Pillai
- Sankaradi as Police Officer
- Pattom Sadan as Thief
- Lalithasree
- Innocent as Bhagavathar

== Soundtrack ==
- "Kandittilla(Chandanathin)" - Krishnachandran, K. S. Chithra
- "Kandittilla" - Krishnachandran, K. S. Chithra
- "Odathe Maane" - Krishnachandran
