= Oru Madapravinte Katha =

- Directed by: Alleppey Ashraf
- Written by: Alleppey Ashraf
- Starring: Prem Nazir; Mammootty; Sankaradi; Shubha
- Cinematography: S. Kumar
- Edited by: A. Sukumaran
- Music by: G. Devarajan
- Production company: Indukala
- Distributed by: Dinny Films
- Release date: 18 March 1983
- Country: India
- Language: Malayalam

Oru Madapravinte Katha (transl. Story of a rock dove) is a 1983 Indian Malayalam-language drama film written and directed by Alleppey Ashraf (in his directorial debut). It stars Prem Nazir, Mammootty, Bheeman Raghu, Ramu, Ajayan, Seema, Nalini, Vanitha Krishnachandran, Shubha, Renuchandra, and Lathika. The film has musical score by G. Devarajan.

== Cast ==
- Prem Nazir as Ravi Prasad
- Mammootty as Balachandran
- Bheeman Raghu
- Ramu as Kochettan
- Ajayan
- Seema as Prabha
- Nalini as Sindhu
- Vanitha Krishnachandran
- Shubha as Amne
- Renuchandra
- Lathika
- Sankaradi
- Maniyanpilla Raju
- K. P. A. C. Azeez
- Kundara Johny
- Kuthiravattam Pappu
- Master Dinku

== Production ==
Initially, the cast included Prem Nazir, Mammootty, and Mohanlal, with Mohanlal even filming a fight sequence alongside Nazir. However, as he was unavailable for the subsequent days of shooting, his character was removed from the story with his consent. Nazir received a remuneration of ₹100,000, while Seema and Mammootty were paid ₹35,000 and ₹25,000, respectively. Mammootty's dialogues was later dubbed by a dubbing artist.

== Soundtrack ==
The music was composed by G. Devarajan with lyrics by Yusufali Kechery.

No.	Song	Singers	Lyrics	Length (m:ss)
1	"Muthe Va Va Mutham Tha Tha"	K. J. Yesudas, Sonia (Baby Sonia)	Yusufali Kechery	
2	"Njaanoru Malayaali" (Pathos) (Bit)	K. J. Yesudas	Yusufali Kechery	
3	"Njanoru Malayali" (Army)	K. J. Yesudas	Yusufali Kechery	
4	"Njanoru Malayali" (Fast)	K. J. Yesudas	Yusufali Kechery	
5	"Vaanil Neelima"	K. J. Yesudas, P. Madhuri	Yusufali Kechery	
