= Chiyangal =

2020 Indian film by Vaigarai Balan

- Release poster
- Directed by: Vaigarai Balan
- Written by: Vaigarai Balan
- Produced by: G.Karikalan
- Starring: Karikalan; Risha
- Cinematography: Babu Kumar.I.E
- Edited by: Mabbu Jyothi Prakash
- Music by: Muthamil
- Production company: KL Production
- Release date: 22 December 2020
- Country: India
- Language: Tamil

Chiyangal (transl. Grandfathers) (Note: People in Meghamalai refer to their grandfathers as Chiyan.) is a 2020 Indian Tamil-language film written and directed by Vaigarai Balan. The film stars Karikalan and Risha, with Nalinikanth and several senior newcomers in supporting roles.

== Cast ==
- Karikalan
- Risha
- Nalinikanth
- Pasupathiraj
- Samuthira Seeni
- Eswar Thiyagarajan
- Sakthivel
- Narayanasamy
- Durai Sundaram

== Production ==
The film is directed by Vaigarai Balan, who previously directed Kadikara Manithargal (2018). The film was shot in Theni and Meghamalai. The film introduces seventy new faces. Chiyangal has a similar premise to Varuthapadatha Valibar Sangam (2013). The film was released under the English title Oldage Villagers.

== Soundtrack ==
Music by Muthamil.

- "Otti Otti Naanum Vaaren" - Karthik, Priya Himesh
- "Otti Otti Naanum Vaaren" - Karthik
- "Chiyaan Chiyaan" - Saisharan
- "Ithu Enna Vithiyo" - Muthamil

== Release ==
A critic from The Times of India gave the film a rating of two-and-a-half out of five stars and opined that "But as the movie inches towards its climax, some of the scenes become melodramatic and the dialogues about protecting parents, though relevant, appear preachy". A critic from Dinamalar gave the film a rating of three-and-a-quarter out of five stars and praised the unique storyline.

== Awards ==
- 2020 - Foreign Features Category at the WorldFest-Houston International Film & Video Festival - Silver Remi Award
- Five Continents International Film Festival
- Grantville International Film Festival
- L’Age d’Or International Arthouse Film Festival
