= Vanitha Police =

- Theatrical release poster
- Directed by: Alleppey Ashraf
- Written by: Priyadarshan
- Produced by: Amminikutty
- Starring: Prem Nazir; Seema; Sukumari; Mohanlal
- Cinematography: Dhananjayan
- Edited by: A. Sukumaran
- Music by: Gopan; Guna Singh (Score)
- Production company: Indukala
- Distributed by: Dinny Films
- Release date: 11 June 1984
- Country: India
- Language: Malayalam

Vanitha Police is a 1984 Indian Malayalam-language film directed by Alleppey Ashraf and written by Priyadarshan. The film stars Prem Nazir, Seema, Sukumari and Mohanlal in main roles. The film features songs composed by Gopan and background score by Guna Singh.

== Cast ==
- Prem Nazir as Pilla
- Seema as PC Sasikala
- Sukumari as HC Idiyan Sarasamma
- Mohanlal as Achuthan
- Jagathy Sreekumar as Sivan Pilla
- Kollam Gopi
- Ramu
- Sankaradi as Chelleppan Pilla
- Alleppey Ashraf as Director Keshavan
- Aroor Sathyan
- Mala Aravindan
- Master Suresh as Vichu
- Meena
- Poojappura Ravi as Vasu Pilla
- Santhakumari
- Sathyachithra
- Sathyakala
- Soorya as Kousalya
- Vanitha Krishnachandran as Rathnamma
- Nalinikanth
- Thavakkala as Undapakru
- Rajan Paul
- Shankar as himself (Cameo appearance)

== Soundtrack ==
The music was composed by Gopan and the lyrics were written by Madhu Alappuzha.

No.	Song	Singers	Lyrics	Length (m:ss)
1	"Eettappuliyo"	K. J. Yesudas	Madhu Alappuzha	
2	"Kanne Karale"	K. J. Yesudas, K. S. Chithra	Madhu Alappuzha	
