= Thavakalai Chittibabu =

Indian actor

- Born: 29 July 1975
- Died: 26 February 2017 (aged 41); Chennai
- Occupation: Actor
- Years active: 1981-2017
- Notable work: Mundhanai Mudichu
- Television: Maya Machhindra

"Thavakalai" Chittibabu (1975 – 2017) was an Indian actor and comedian who appeared in predominantly Tamil-language films. He has acted in over 500 films in Tamil, Telugu, Malayalam, Kannada, Hindi and Sinhala.

== Early life ==
His mother tongue is Tamil. His hometown is Tamil Nadu, Chennai district. His mother's name is Subbulakshmi and his father's name is Vijayakumar. He was also an actor. He has acted as a group dancer in films in Tamil and Telugu before coming to act Mundhanai Mudichu.

== Film career ==
His father was the co-star agent of Poi Satchi film, he went to Arunachalam Studios one day with his father while filming. It was then that actor Kullamani introduced him to actor Bhagyaraj. Director K. Bhagyaraj remembers Thavakalai he had always seen in Chennai and chose the film 'Mundhanai Mudichu'. Took him to AVM. He took him to the Gopichettipalayam. After the release of the film, the boy became very busy. He participated in the inaugural, introductory and complimentary ceremonies. He became a big fan of many stage shows in one year. He also acted in a few Telugu films such as Nenu Maa Avida (1981) before he started acting in Tamil films.

== Television career ==
He also acted many in Tamil television serials. He has acted in Maya Machhindra serial on Vijay television and My Dear Bootham on Sun TV.

== Death ==
He lived in Vadapalani, Chennai. He had a heart attack and died on 26 February 2017 at his home.

== Filmography ==
This is a partial filmography. You can expand it.

=== Tamil films ===
Year	Film	Role	Notes
1982	Payanangal Mudivathillai		
1983	Mundhanai Mudichu	Thavakkalai	
1983	Naalu Perukku Nandri		
1984	Aathora Aatha		
1984	Neram Nalla Neram		
1984	Osai	Thavakkalai	
1984	Ponnu Pudichirukku		
1984	Thangamadi Thangam		
1984	Neengal Kettavai		
1985	Kaakki Sattai		
1985	Aan Paavam		
1988	Thaimel Aanai		
1988	Naan Sonnathey Sattam		
1989	Manandhal Mahadevan		
1989	En Rathathin Rathame		
1990	Paattali Magan		
1992	Thangarassu		
1993	Rajadhi Raja Raja Kulothunga Raja Marthanda Raja Gambeera Kathavaraya Krishna Kamarajan		
1995	Paattu Vaathiyar	Ice Cream Seller	
1998	Cheran Chozhan Pandian		
1999	Poo Vaasam		

=== Other language films ===
Year	Film	Role	Language	Notes
1981	Nenu Maa Avida		Telugu	
1983	Moodu Mullu		Telugu	credited as Vichitra Kumar
1984	Vanitha Police	Undapakru	Malayalam	credited as Thavakkala
1985	Masterji	School Boy Student	Hindi	
1985	Mohabbat		Hindi	Uncredited
1986	Ghar Sansar	Bankelal son Chotu	Hindi	
1986	Naga Devatha		Telugu	
1989	Zoo Laka Taka		Telugu	
1990	Baap Numbri Beta Dus Numbri	Jamboora	Telugu	
1997	Super Heroes			
2017	Gandhinagaril Unniyarcha		Malayalam	
