= Moodu Mullu =

1983 film by Jandhyala

- Poster
- Directed by: Jandhyala
- Screenplay by: Jandhyala
- Based on: Mundhanai Mudichu (Tamil) by K. Bhagyaraj
- Produced by: P. Sasibhusan
- Starring: Chandramohan; Radhika
- Cinematography: S. Gopal Reddy
- Edited by: Gautam Raju
- Music by: Rajan–Nagendra
- Production companies: AVM Productions; Sri Saradhi Studios
- Release date: 9 September 1983
- Country: India
- Language: Telugu

Moodu Mullu (transl. Three knots) is a 1983 Indian Telugu-language romantic comedy film written and directed by Jandhyala. It is a remake of the 1983 Tamil film Mundhanai Mudichu. The film stars Chandramohan and Radhika. It was released on 9 September 1983 and emerged a commercial success.

== Cast ==
- Chandra Mohan as Master-u
- Radhika as Gowri
- Geetha as Geetha, Master-u's colleague
- Rajyalakshmi as Master-u's ex-wife (cameo)
- Kantha Rao as President Dharmayya
- Suthi Velu
- Suthi Veerabhadra Rao
- Nalinikanth as Ratnam
- Janaki
- Gangaratnam
- Shakuntala
- Master Ali as a naughty student
- Master Chakravarthy as a naughty student
- Vichitra Kumar as a naughty student
- Yoganand as Master-u's son
- Kota Srinivasa Rao as a priest

== Production ==
Moodu Mullu is a remake of the 1983 Tamil film Mundhanai Mudichu. It was directed by Jandhyala who also wrote the screenplay. AVM Productions, the producers of the original, produced the remake in association with Sri Saradhi Studios. Cinematography was handled by S. Gopal Reddy, and editing by Gautham Raju. The film eschewed many double entendre/suggestive dialogues from Mundhanai Mudichu. Principal photography took place in and around Amalapuram and West Godavari district, in a single schedule that lasted between 30 and 40 working days.

== Soundtrack ==
The soundtrack was composed by Rajan–Nagendra, with lyrics by Veturi and Jyothirmayi. The tune of the song "Nee Kosam Yavvanamantha" and "Leta Chaligaalulu" was adapted from the composers' own songs "Aakashave Beelali Mele" and "Preethiya Maathige Ethake Naachike" from the Kannada films Nyayave Devaru (1971) and Gayathri Maduve (1983), respectively. (Note: Sri of Telugucinema.com does not mention the original song names.)

Track listing
No.	Title	Singer(s)	Length
1.	"Swagatham Swagatham"	P. Susheela
2.	"Jojo Laali"	S. P. Balasubrahmanyam, P. Susheela
3.	"Leta Chaligaalulu"	S. P. Balasubrahmanyam, P. Susheela
4.	"Neekosam Yavvanamantha"	S. P. Balasubrahmanyam, P. Suseela
5.	"Chalinchu Vuthuthi"	S. P. Balasubrahmanyam, P. Suseela
6.	"Jo Jo Laali"	S. P. Balasubrahmanyam, P. Suseela

== Release and reception ==
Moodu Mullu was released on 9 September 1983, and was commercially successful.
