= V. R. Gopalakrishnan =

Malayalam film director

V. R. Gopalakrishnan was a Malayalam film director and story writer.

== Career ==
He wrote the story / screenplay / dialogues for 16 films. His noteworthy films are Dheem Tharikida Thom, Cheppu and Vandanam, all directed by Priyadarshan. Gopalakrishnan also directed 4 films, one of which was unreleased.

He also worked as an associate director for 12 films, all directed by his close friend Priyadarshan.

== Death ==
Gopalakrishnan committed suicide at his home in Ramanathapuram, Palakkad, Kerala on 11 January 2016, leaving behind his wife (Geetha) and two sons (Arjun and Aravind).

== Filmography ==
Year	Title	Credit
1986	Dheem Tharikida Thom	Screenplay, Dialogue
1987	Cheppu	Screenplay, Dialogue
1989	Vandanam	Screenplay, Dialogue
1989	Aazhikkoru Muthu	Screenplay, Dialogue
1989	Chakkikotha Chankaran	Story, Screenplay, Dialogue
1991	Kakkathollayiram	Director, Story, Screenplay, Dialogue
1991	Kouthuka Varthakal	Story, Screenplay, Dialogue
1992	Kaazhchakkappuram	Director
1993	Koushalam	Screenplay, Dialogue
1994	Cabinet	Story, Screenplay, Dialogue
1994	Geetham Sangeetham (U)	Director
1994	Bharya	Director
1995	Thovalapookkal	Co-screenplay, Co-dialogue
1997	Shobhanam	Screenplay, Dialogue
2000	Pilots	Dialogue
2001	Ee Parakkum Thalika	Screenplay, Dialogue
2002	Www.anukudumbam.com	Story, Screenplay, Dialogue
2005	Kalyana Kurimanam	Story, Screenplay, Dialogue
2005	Hai	Screenplay, Dialogue
