= Ozhivukaalam =

- Promotional Poster
- Directed by: Bharathan
- Written by: P. Padmarajan
- Produced by: P. V. Gangadharan
- Starring: Prem Nazir; Srividya; Rohini; Karamana Janardanan Nair
- Cinematography: Madhu Ambat
- Edited by: N. P. Suresh
- Music by: Johnson
- Production company: Grihalakshmi Productions
- Release date: 25 April 1985
- Country: India
- Language: Malayalam

Ozhivukaalam is a 1985 Indian Malayalam-language film, written by P. Padmarajan, directed by Bharathan and produced by P. V. Gangadharan. The film stars Prem Nazir, Srividya, Rohini and Menaka. The film has musical score by Johnson.

== Plot ==
Chinnu returns to her home for vacation, to her widowed mother. Her mother, Nirmala, has only Nandini as a companion when Chinnu goes to Bangalore for her studies. Chinnu lost her father twelve years ago and on thinking that her mother will be all alone once she leaves for higher studies, Chinnu advises her mother to remarry someone. Nirmala informs Chinnu that it is Das. Chinnu will feel a sudden discomfort on hearing that name but Nirmala feels very elated. She tells Chinnu that Das uncle, her cousin, will be visiting them. The scene then shifts to the past where it is shown that Nirmala and Das are in love and they have sex. Nirmala's father happen to see this and throws his nephew, Das, and his mother out of the family house because he felt that his daughter falling in love with a jobless man like Das would mean the end for her. He then has Nirmala marry Ramachandran, a rich man. After several years, Nirmala and Das meet again at Coorg where Nirmala was staying with her husband, Ramachandran and baby Chinnu. Das reveals to her that he has a managerial job now and he chose a posting at Coorg to see her. Ramachandran who is a chronic drunkard feels that something is going on between Nirmala and Das and constantly harasses them by creating stories about them. Nirmala suffers everything in silence. The scene then shifts to the present where Das arrives and considers Chinnu like his own daughter. Nirmala and Das had planned to marry and Nirmala asks for Chinnu's opinion which was negative. On enquiring the reason Chinnu just slips away by rude talking and plans to go back to Bangalore. Nirmala asks her to wait for just one more day as it is her father's death anniversary, to which she agrees. On this day she suddenly breaks and says that Das killed her father by pushing him out a boat in which they three travelled together. She had concealed this for years to protect her mother and she hates Das for this. Nirmala questions Das and he admits to the deed. Nirmala expels him from the house and after he leaves she tells Chinnu that Das is her real father and she was pregnant with Chinnu before her marriage to Ramachandran, whom she married only due to her father's insistence.

== Cast ==
- Prem Nazir as Das
- Srividya as Nirmala
- Rohini as Chinnu
- Jalaja as Nandini
- Karamana Janardanan Nair as Ramachandran
- Kottayam Shantha as Das's mother
- Bhaskara Kurup as Nirmala's father
- Pratheesh as Surendran
- K. T. C. Abdullah
- Sreekutti Bharathan as Young Chinnu
- Abdullah
- P. V. Gangadharan

== Soundtrack ==
The music was composed by Johnson with lyrics by K. Jayakumar.

No.	Song	Singers	Lyrics	Length (m:ss)
1	"Choolam Kuthum"	Ashalatha, Chorus, Lathika	K. Jayakumar	
2	"Naagappattu"	Johnson, Bharathan, Radhika Warrier		
3	"Saayanthanam Nizhalveeshiyilla"	K. J. Yesudas, S. Janaki	K. Jayakumar	
