= Krooran =

- Directed by: K. S. Gopalakrishnan
- Written by: K. S. Gopalakrishnan
- Screenplay by: K. S. Gopalakrishnan
- Starring: Jagathy Sreekumar; Priya
- Edited by: C. Mani
- Music by: Rathnasoori
- Production company: Lekshmiguru Films
- Distributed by: Lekshmiguru Films
- Release date: 1989
- Country: India
- Language: Malayalam

Krooran is a 1989 Indian Malayalam film, directed by K. S. Gopalakrishnan. The film stars Jagathy Sreekumar and Priya in the lead roles. The film has musical score by Rathnasoori.

== Cast ==
- Jagathy Sreekumar
- Priya

== Soundtrack ==
The music was composed by Rathnasoori and the lyrics were written by Bharanikkavu Sivakumar.

No.	Song	Singers	Lyrics	Length (m:ss)
1	"Poonthaliril Manjuthulli"	K. S. Chithra	Bharanikkavu Sivakumar	
2	"Yaamangal Thorum"	P. Jayachandran, Ambili, Chorus	Bharanikkavu Sivakumar	
