= Kouthuka Varthakal =

- Directed by: Thulasidas
- Written by: V. R. Gopalakrishnan
- Screenplay by: V. R. Gopalakrishnan
- Produced by: Navas
- Starring: Mukesh; Suresh Gopi; Urvashi; Ranjini
- Cinematography: Vipin Mohan
- Edited by: G. Murali
- Music by: Johnson
- Production company: Navayuga Arts
- Distributed by: Navayuga Arts
- Release date: 4 October 1990
- Country: India
- Language: Malayalam

Kouthuka Varthakal is a 1990 Indian Malayalam-language comedy film directed by Thulasidas and produced by Navas. It stars Mukesh in the lead role. With Suresh Gopi, Siddique, Mamukkoya, Urvashi, and Ranjini in supporting roles. The film has a musical score by Johnson. It was partially inspired by Worth Winning (1989).

== Plot ==
The movie begins with the arrival of Ramamurthy, a man who has been newly employed as a school teacher, at the house of his friend, Raveendran "Ravi", where two other bachelors, Pavithran and Mathew Ninan Koshy, live. Mathew is promiscuous, and one night, when all of them are drunk, they place a bet on Mathew to woo the woman they choose with 10,000 rupees in return for it. Ramamurthy, after great difficulty, points out a woman they see in a temple. Kamalu is a young Tamil woman who is married to a relatively old man, Soorya Narayana Iyer. Kamalu falls for Mathew. Pavithran shows him a woman named Rosemary, who takes longer to fall for him, but eventually does. To continue the relationship, he breaks up with Kamalu. Raveendran decides to play a trick on Mathew by asking him to seduce his fiancée, Ashwathy, whom he thinks will not fall for Mathew and will end his promiscuity. Eventually, Mathew makes Ashwathy fall for him, making Raveendran angry. He apologises and breaks up with Ashwathy after Raveendran tells him the truth. He decides to marry Rosemary, but fails when she disagrees. The film ends with the marriage of Raveendran and Ashwathy and Mathew and Rosemary.

== Cast ==
- Mukesh as Mathew Ninan Koshy "Achayan"
- Suresh Gopi as Raveendran / Ravi, Mathew's friend and roommate
- Ranjini as Rose Mary, Mathew's love interest
- Urvashi as Aswathy Nair, Ravi's cousin and lover
- Siddique as Pavithran, Mathew and Ravi's friend and roommate
- Maniyanpilla Raju as Ramamoorthy "Swamy", Mathew, Ravi, and Pavithran's friend and roommate
- Mamukkoya as Ahmad Kutty / A Kutty, Mathew, Ravi, Pavithran, and Ramamoorthy's friend and house servant
- Innocent as LIC Officer Soorya Narayana Iyer
- Kalpana as Kamala Lakshmi / Kamalu, Soorya Narayana Iyer's wife and Mathew's ex-girlfriend
- Philomina as Rose Mary's grandmother
- Sankaradi as Aswathy's father and Ravi's uncle
- N. L. Balakrishnan as Chacko, Rose Mary's uncle
- Kaladi Omana as Mathew's mother
