= Naan Sonnathey Sattam =

- Title card
- Directed by: Rameshraj
- Written by: Aaroor Dass (dialogues)
- Screenplay by: P. Shanmugasundaram
- Story by: P. Shanmugasundaram
- Produced by: S. K. Bhagawan
- Starring: Charan Raj; Rekha
- Cinematography: C. Mahendra
- Edited by: P. Bhaktavatsalam
- Music by: Ilaiyaraaja
- Production company: Sri Manthralaya Chitralaya
- Release date: 29 July 1988
- Country: India
- Language: Tamil

Naan Sonnathey Sattam (transl. My word is the law) is a 1988 Indian Tamil-language action film directed by Rameshraj, starring Charan Raj and Rekha. The film, produced by Sri Manthralaya Chitralaya, was released on 29 July 1988.

== Plot ==
Kaali is a rowdy that's in and out of jail. Aasha is a social worker that runs a sewing factory for disadvantaged women. The factory was built on government land approved through proper channels. Nagalingam is a rich, influential smuggler that has plans for the land. He hires Kaali to close the factory causing friction between Kaali and Aasha. He attempts to kill Aasha and is saved by inspector David.

In a twist, Aasha refuses to press charges against Kaali as she feels even he is not beyond redemption. Moved by her faith in him, Kaali vows to only use violence in helping people. This new attitude pits him against Nagalingam as well as his younger brother Aalavandhan. Aasha wants Kaali to become a pacifist. Kaali explains his path to rowdyism began with his father's arrest and hanging for a crime he did not commit. Kaali's widowed mother struggles to put him through college but falls ill. He turns to crime to get the money to save her life and is arrested which sets him on a path to criminality. Having fallen in love with Aasha, Kaali agrees to her request to give up violence.

Ponni, a young woman who loves Kaali, tells him of Aasha's closeness to her old collegemate, Ashok. Kaali witnesses a close moment between the two and is heartbroken believing the two to be in love. Still, he rejects Ponni who marries Sappani. Aalavandhan attempts to assault Ponni on her wedding day resulting in both her and Sappani's death. Kaali is framed for these deaths and arrested again.

While visiting him in prison, Aasha confesses her love for Kaali. Determined to free him, she files a complaint with evidence against Nagalingam and Aalavandhan. They plan to silence her before they're arrested. Kaali is released from jail the for good behavior and embarks on a mission to save Aasha.

== Cast ==
- Charan Raj as Kaali
- Rekha as Aasha
- Vinu Chakravarthy as Nagalingam
- S. S. Chandran as Aalavandhan
- Senthil as Kabali
- Nassar as Inspector David
- Charle as Sappani
- Vadivukkarasi as Aasha's mother
- Kuyili as Ponni
- Pasi Narayanan
- Thavakalai Chittibabu
- Vishwas as Ashok (credited as Ashok Kumar)
- Umashree as Andaal

== Soundtrack ==
The music was composed by Ilaiyaraaja. The song "Oru Devathai Vanthu" is set to the raga Hamir Kalyani.

Track listing
No.	Title	Lyrics	Singer(s)	Length
1.	"Aagayam Bhoolagam"	Vaali	S. P. Balasubrahmanyam, Asha Bhosle
2.	"Adhikalai Nera"	Vaali	S. P. Balasubrahmanyam, Asha Bhosle
3.	"Oru Devathai Vanthu"	Na. Kamarasan	S. P. Balasubrahmanyam, Asha Bhosle
4.	"Idhu Kadhal Nenjam"	Gangai Amaran	Asha Bhosle
5.	"Unnai Suthum"	Gangai Amaran	Asha Bhosle

== Reception ==
The Indian Express noted the film's similarities to Kadalora Kavithaigal (1986) about a woman reforming a violent man, commenting that "while [Kadalora Kavithaigal] had sentimental touches it is action that dominates [Naan Sonnathey Sattam]".
