= Neela Kuyil =

1995 Tamil film

- Title card
- Directed by: Alleppey Ashraf
- Written by: Priyadarshan; K. N. Anand (dialogues)
- Produced by: Harees
- Starring: Pandiarajan; Rajashree
- Cinematography: J. Williams
- Edited by: L. Boominathan
- Music by: Manikka Vinayagam
- Production company: Annu Pictures
- Release date: 23 October 1995
- Running time: 130 minutes
- Country: India
- Language: Tamil

Neela Kuyil (transl. The blue koel) is a 1995 Indian Tamil-language drama film directed by Alleppey Ashraf. The film stars Pandiarajan and Rajashree, with Manorama, Radha Ravi, Vennira Aadai Moorthy, Senthil, Vadivelu and Y. G. Mahendra playing supporting roles. It is a remake of the Malayalam film Ninnistham Ennishtam which itself was inspired by Charlie Chaplin's City Lights. The film was released on 23 October 1995.

== Plot ==
Muthusamy is a poor and not-too-good-looking man, who roams the streets. Kaattayi, an old woman and street astrologer, becomes his friend and she gives him money to eat every day. Muthusamy lost his parents at a young age. One day, he meets Shalini a blind flower seller and Muthusamy befriends the innocent Shalini, he introduces himself as a rich business magnate. Shalini has a brother : Veerasamy, a dreaded rowdy. Muthusamy slowly falls in love with Shalini. He decides to pay for her surgery to repair Shalini's eyes : he worked day and night and sold his mother's gold pendant. The police suspect Muthusamy of stealing that gold pendant and arrests him, before being arrested he manages to give his money to Shalini. After the successful surgery, Shalini can see but Muthusamy is not there to see her happiness.

Shalini becomes friends with the doctor Raja who operated her eyes. Raja finds her voice sweet, and recommends her to his friend Raja, a music director. The first song Shalini sang becomes a chartbuster and she becomes the busiest singer of the cinema industry. After being released from jail, Muthusamy tries to meet Shalini. What transpires next forms the rest of the story.

== Cast ==
- Pandiarajan as Muthusamy
- Rajashree as Shalini
- Manorama as Kaattayi
- Radha Ravi as Raja
- Vennira Aadai Moorthy as Kannayiram
- Senthil
- Vadivelu as Mambattiyan
- Y. G. Mahendra as Madhan
- Pasi Narayanan
- Vellai Subbaiah
- Karuppu Subbiah
- Joker Thulasi

== Production ==
The climax scene was shot in an auditorium before 3,000 spectators.

== Soundtrack ==
The soundtrack was composed by Manikka Vinayagam, with lyrics written by Vaali.

Song	Singer(s)	Duration
"Oru Vanambadithan"	S. P. Balasubrahmanyam, Swarnalatha	4:38
"Poo Malai Idhu" (duet)	K. J. Yesudas, Sujatha Mohan	4:33
"Poo Malai Idhu" (solo)	Sujatha Mohan	4:46
"Sruthilayam"	Sujatha Mohan	5:23
"Yar Nenjilea"	Swarnalatha	5:00

== Critical reception ==
Thulasi of Kalki wrote that today everyone believes in grandeur and great heroes. The director of this film relies on story and poignant sentiment. More than that he relies on the screenplay, so hope is not wasted. D. S. Ramanujam of The Hindu wrote "A team of comedians keep the fun sometimes with `sickly' jokes, right through Anu Pictures' Neela Kuyil, a small budget movie set to catch the eye of the ordinary viewers of the mofussil. Priyadarshan's story and screenplay are not powerful enough to make director Ashraf draw something more from the artistes, Vadivelu and Senthil, both working in tandem as cheats and tricksters, cornering most frames. Hero Pandiyarajan is sidelined in a role not suited to him a lamenting hero ruing his misfortune".
