= Masterji =

1985 film by K. Raghavendra Rao

- Promotional Poster
- Directed by: K. Raghavendra Rao
- Written by: Dialogues: Kader Khan
- Screenplay by: K. Bhagyaraj
- Based on: Mundhanai Mudichu (Tamil) by K. Bhagyaraj
- Produced by: R. C. Prakash
- Starring: Rajesh Khanna; Sridevi
- Cinematography: K. S. Prakash Rao
- Edited by: V.R. Kotagiri
- Music by: Bappi Lahiri
- Production company: Shiv Shakti Films
- Release date: 31 May 1985
- Country: India
- Language: Hindi

Masterji is a 1985 Indian Hindi-language romantic comedy hit film directed by K. Raghavendra Rao and written by K. Bhagyaraj. The film stars Rajesh Khanna and Sridevi. It is a remake of Bhagyaraj's own Tamil film Mundhanai Mudichu (1983).

In the film, Radha falls in love with the new teacher employed in the village school. Being a widower with a son, he snubs her. In response, she publicly accuses him of having an affair with her. The film was released theatrically on 31 May 1985. It was one of the highest grossing Bollywood movie of 1985.

== Plot ==
Radha (Sridevi) is a notorious prankster creating a variety of mischiefs along with her gang, which often end up in the village court. Masterji (Rajesh Khanna) enters the village with his infant child to take up the vacant teacher post in the local school, but isn't spared from Radha's pranks upon his arrival. He takes up the job with one hand holding the book, and the other rocking the cradle in the classroom much to the amusement of local folk in the village. Radha's playful nature transforms into love when she learns that he's a widower. She tries many ways to win the teacher's heart, but fails every time. The teacher believes that a stepmother would not take care of his child, and thus even rejects the offer to marry his dead wife's sister. As a last hope to attain him, Radha blames the teacher for molesting her and even swears on it by crossing over his child in front of the village court. Petrified, and with the whole village surrounded, he is left with very little option than to marry her. But vows never to touch her and remain in celibacy. But Radha doesn't give up here. She relentlessly tries to seduce him by unconventional methods that prove to be testing times for the teacher. With the chances of winning him slowly decreasing, Radha comes to a conclusion once and for all.

== Cast ==
- Rajesh Khanna as Raju
- Sridevi as Radha
- Anita Raj as Shobha
- Kader Khan as Jamnadas
- Shakti Kapoor as Bholashankar
- Aruna Irani as Roopa
- Asrani as Pandit
- Shyama as Shanti
- Om Shivpuri as Vaid
- Jayshree Gadkar as Masterji's Mother-in-law.
- Thavakalai Chittibabu as School student

== Production ==
The Hindi remake rights were acquired for ₹500,000 (equivalent to ₹9.2 million or US$99,000 in 2026), the highest ever paid for a remake rights of a Tamil film at that time.

== Soundtrack ==
Song	Singer
"Gaalon Par Yeh Kaise Nishaan, Honth Kisike Meharbaan"	Kishore Kumar, S. Janaki
"Bulbul Mere Bata Kya Hai Meri Khata"	Kishore Kumar, Lata Mangeshkar
"Jab Tanhai Me Do Badan Paas Aate Hai"	Kishore Kumar, Asha Bhosle
"Aankhen To Kholo Swami, Jawani Dekho Swami"	Kishore Kumar, Asha Bhosle
"Dumkhamwala, Balam Matwala"	Asha Bhosle

== Box office ==
Masterji was a hit at box-office, according to Trade Guide.
