= Chillu Kottaram =

- Directed by: K. G. Rajasekharan
- Starring: Srividya; Sukumaran; Balan K. Nair; Jalaja
- Cinematography: Ramakrishnan
- Edited by: K. Sankunni
- Music by: A. T. Ummer
- Production company: Shanmukhapriya Films
- Distributed by: Shanmukhapriya Films
- Release date: 4 January 1985
- Country: India
- Language: Malayalam

Chillu Kottaram is a 1985 Indian Malayalam film, directed by K. G. Rajasekharan. The film stars Srividya, Sukumaran, Balan K. Nair and Jalaja in the lead roles. The film has musical score by A. T. Ummer. It was a commercial success. It also became the first Malayalam film to run for 100 days in Andhra Pradesh.

== Cast ==
- Srividya
- Sukumaran
- Balan K. Nair
- Jalaja
- Kunchan
- Mallika Sukumaran
- Kuthiravattam Pappu

== Soundtrack ==
The music was composed by A. T. Ummer and the lyrics were written by Poovachal Khader.

No.	Song	Singers	Lyrics	Length (m:ss)
1	"Aashamsakal Nalkaan Vannu"	K. J. Yesudas	Poovachal Khader	
2	"Njan Choodilaada"	S. Janaki	Poovachal Khader	
3	"Valakilukkam Thalakilukkam"	S. Janaki	Poovachal Khader	

== See also ==
- List of Malayalam films of 1985
