= Manakkale Thatha =

- Directed by: Babu Korula
- Written by: Jayasankar Pothuvathu
- Screenplay by: Jayasankar Pothuvathu
- Produced by: Babu Korula
- Starring: Nalinikanth; Jagathy Sreekumar; Rohini; Captain Raju
- Cinematography: B. R. Ramakrishna
- Edited by: K. Narayanan
- Music by: A. T. Ummer
- Release date: 13 February 1985
- Country: India
- Language: Malayalam

Manakkale Thatha is a 1985 Indian Malayalam film, directed by Babu Korula and produced by Babu Korula. The film stars Nalinikanth, Jagathy Sreekumar, Rohini and Captain Raju in the lead roles. The film has musical score by A. T. Ummer.

== Cast ==
- Nalinikanth as Watchman
- Jagathy Sreekumar as Sankara Narayanan Namboothiri
- Rohini as Mini
- Captain Raju as Investigator
- Unnimary as Joly
- Kunchan
- Oduvil Unnikrishnan as Damodhara Kurup
- T. G. Ravi as Johnny
- Kunchan as Investigator
- Renuka

== Soundtrack ==
The music was composed by A. T. Ummer and the lyrics were written by Bharanikkavu Sivakumar.

No.	Song	Singers	Lyrics	Length (m:ss)
1	"Happy Birthday to Me..Thaarukale Thalirukale"	K. S. Chithra	Bharanikkavu Sivakumar	
2	"Ponmarakkuda Choodi"	Krishnachandran	Bharanikkavu Sivakumar	
