= Varthamana Kalam =

Varthamanakaalam (1990)
- Directed by: I. V. Sasi
- Written by: Prasanth
- Produced by: Liberty Basheer for Liberty Films
- Starring: Suresh Gopi; Jayaram; Balachandra Menon; Urvashi
- Cinematography: Santosh Sivan
- Edited by: K. Narayanan
- Music by: Johnson
- Release date: January 1990
- Country: India
- Language: Malayalam

Varthamanakaalam is a 1990 Indian Malayalam-language film, directed by I. V. Sasi and produced by Liberty Basheer. The film stars Suresh Gopi, Jayaram, Balachandra Menon and Urvashi. The film has musical score by Johnson.

== Plot ==
Arundhathi Menon arrives at a cottage that was gifted by her boyfriend Jameskutty. That night, her memories travel back to childhood and teenage days. Arundhathi, single daughter of Menon master is full of life. She gets admission in a college in the city and is accompanied by Bramhadathan Embranthiri, her neighbor. However, her dreams get shattered when Bramhadathan hands her over to a businessman. She is raped by the businessman who offers Bramhadathan a job in return. Arundhathi's father commits suicide after the incident. Alone, Arundhathi had to undergo several sexual encounters from hooligans. One night, while in an attempt to save herself, Arundhathi falls into the net of a lady pimp nicknamed "Mummy". She meets Jameskutty, an ad film maker who falls in love with her. Jameskutty saves her from the brothel by making her his concubine. However, things get an ugly turn when George Thomas, alias GT, a friend of Jameskutty sets his eyes on Arundhathi. GT and gan attacks Jameskutty to kidnap Arundhathi. However, they are defeated by the valiant defence of Jameskutty, who but vomits blood after the fight. He discloses to Arundhathi that he is a heart patient and may die soon. Arundhathi, who is now pregnant with the child of Jameskutty is shattered by the news. Jameskutty dies after keeping her as nominee of all his wealth. Arundhathi is brutally raped by GT and gang at a cemetery and this incident leads to her abortion. Arundhathi bids goodbye to the city and is back in the village to lead a retired life. She meets Balagopalan, her childhood friend who is now separated from wife. Though Balagopalan is attracted to Arundhathi, she stays away from him. Meanwhile, Balagopalan's wife is back, making Arundhathi leave the village forever. On her return journey, she finds GT and gang assaulting a girl. In an attempt to save her, Arundhathi runs over her car over GT and kills him. She waits inside while police arrive to arrest her for the murder. Bramhadathan, who is now a reporter also arrives at the scene to cover the news and is shocked to see Arundhathi while credits start rolling.

== Cast ==
- Balachandra Menon as Jameskutty
- Urvashi as Arundhathi Menon
- Suresh Gopi as Balagopalan
- Jayaram as Brahmadathan
- M. G. Soman as Ravunni Master
- K. P. Ummer as K. P. Menon
- Paravoor Bharathan as Thomachan
- Jagannatha Varma as Menon Master
- Babu Namboothiri as Shekhara Pillai
- Lalu Alex as George Thomas
- Prathapachandran
- Siddique
- Sukumari as Mrs. Menon

== Soundtrack ==
The music was composed by Johnson.

No.	Song	Singers	Lyrics	Length (m:ss)
1	"Paadunna Ganathin"	K. S. Chithra	Sreekumaran Thampi	00.00
2	"Paadunna Ganathin" (Sad)	K. S. Chithra	Sreekumaran Thampi	
3	"Paadunnaganathin"	K. S. Chithra	Sreekumaran Thampi	
4	"Oru Thari Velicham"	M. G. Sreekumar	Sreekumaran Thampi	
5	"Vasanthathin"	Venugopal	Sreekumaran Thampi	

== Awards ==
Kerala State Film Award

- Best Actress- Urvashi
