= Idhayam Pesugirathu =

- Directed by: S. A. Chandrasekharan
- Written by: S. A. Chandrasekharan
- Starring: Raveendran; Ambika
- Cinematography: D. D. Prasad
- Edited by: P. R. Gowthamraj
- Music by: Shyam
- Release date: 5 February 1982
- Country: India
- Language: Tamil

Idhayam Pesugirathu (transl. The heart speaks) is a 1981 Indian Tamil-language film written and directed by S. A. Chandrasekharan, starring Raveendran and Ambika. It was released on 5 February 1982.

== Cast ==
- Raveendran as Sundar
- Ambika as Usha
- Thengai Srinivasan
- Poornam Viswanathan
- Vijayaraj as Vijay
- Selvaraj
- Gandhimathi
- Pasi Sathya

== Soundtrack ==
The music was composed by Shyam.

Track listing
No.	Title	Singer(s)	Length
1.	"Aadungal Paadungal"	S. P. Balasubrahmanyam	4:29
2.	"Idhayam Idhayam"	S. P. Balasubrahmanyam, S. Janaki	4:29
3.	"Moham Sangeetha"	S. P. Balasubrahmanyam, D. Kousalya	4:13
4.	"Vaarai Kanne"	B. Balamurthy, D. Kousalya	4:44
Total length:			17:55

== Reception ==
Thiraignani of Kalki wrote it feels like a story originated from Nenjil Or Aalayam but becomes meh.
