= Kakkathollayiram =

Kakka Thollayiram
- Poster
- Directed by: V. R. Gopalakrishnan
- Written by: V. R. Gopalakrishnan
- Starring: Mukesh; Urvashi; Chithra; Sukumari
- Cinematography: Saloo George
- Edited by: N. Gopalakrishnan
- Music by: Johnson
- Production company: Navayuga Arts
- Distributed by: Navayuga Arts
- Release date: 1991
- Country: India
- Language: Malayalam

Kakka Thollayiram is a 1991 Indian Malayalam film, directed by V. R. Gopalakrishnan. The film stars Mukesh, Urvashi, Chithra and Sukumari in the lead roles. The film has musical score by Johnson. Urvashi won the Kerala State Film Award for Best Actress for her performance in the film.

== Plot ==
Revathy, sister of Rajashekaran is mentally handicapped, due to typhoid that affected her brain during childhood. Rajashekaran loves his sister more than anything else in the world. Balakrishnan, Rajashekharan's friend is also dearly attached to Revathy.

Revathy's favourite story, which Rajashekharan has told her, is that of the princess who had collected a coral bead each day for many years awaiting her prince. After hearing the story, Revathy assumes herself as the princess waiting for the prince, and had started collecting coral beads each day.

Ravi, who is a friend of Balakrishnan is partying with him one day . He meets Revathy and ends up having sex with her . She eventually becomes pregnant. Rejashekharan is enraged when he finds out. However, Revathy views Ravi as her “prince”, and has fallen in love with him. She wishes to marry her "prince". Rajashekaran reluctantly agrees and asks Balakrishnan to bring Ravi.

Ravi declines to marry Revathy because she is mentally handicapped, which further enrages Rajashekharan. However, Ravi comes to realise his mistake and agrees to Balakrishnan to marry Revathy. When Ravi returns, Rajashekaran, not knowing that Ravi has accepted Revathy, brutally beats and stabs him. Revathy is shocked to know that the prince for whom she was waiting for, is dead.

== Cast ==
- Mukesh as Rajasekharan
- Urvashi as Revathy /Rajasekharan's sister
- Chithra as Radhika/ Rajasekharan's love interest
- Sukumari as Balakrishnan's Mother
- KPAC Lalitha as Menon's Wife
- Sankaradi as Doctor Varkey
- Philomina as Varkey's wife
- Appa Haja
- Bobby Kottarakkara as Pushkaran
- Ganesh Kumar as Balakrishnan
- Mamukkoya as Akbar
- Oduvil Unnikrishnan as Menon
- Sai Kumar as Ravi
- Santha Devi
- Santhakumari as Jameela, Wife of Akbar
- Shivaji as Raju
- Thesni Khan as Sainaba
- Jagadish as Shamsu
- Biyon
- Thrissur Elsy as Leelamma

== Soundtrack ==
The music was composed by Johnson and the lyrics were written by Kaithapram.

No.	Song	Singers	Lyrics	Length (m:ss)
1	"Madanappoo"	K. S. Chithra	Kaithapram	
2	"Paalaruvi Kuliraniyum"	M. G. Sreekumar, Sujatha Mohan	Kaithapram	
3	"Thaanaaro"	Krishnachandran	Kaithapram	

== Awards ==
Kerala State Film Award

- Best Actress – Urvashi
