= Kathirmandapam =

- Directed by: K. P. Pillai
- Written by: Sreekumaran Thampi
- Screenplay by: Sreekumaran Thampi
- Produced by: HD Combines
- Starring: Prem Nazir; Madhu; Jayabharathi; Urvashi
- Edited by: M. N. Appu
- Music by: V. Dakshinamoorthy
- Production company: HD Combines
- Distributed by: HD Combines
- Release date: 26 October 1979
- Country: India
- Language: Malayalam

Kathirmandapam is a 1979 Indian Malayalam film, directed by K. P. Pillai and produced by HD Combines. The film stars Prem Nazir, Madhu, Jayabharathi and Urvashi in the lead roles. The film has musical score by V. Dakshinamoorthy.

== Cast ==
- Prem Nazir
- Madhu
- Jayabharathi
- Urvashi as Child Artist
- Adoor Bhasi
- Jose Prakash
- Sankaradi
- Sreelatha Namboothiri
- K. P. Ummer
- Meena

== Soundtrack ==
The music was composed by V. Dakshinamoorthy and the lyrics were written by Sreekumaran Thampi.

| No. | Song | Singers | Lyrics | Length (m:ss) |
|---|---|---|---|---|
| 1 | "Athappookkalam" | Ambili, Sherin Peters | Sreekumaran Thampi | |
| 2 | "Chembakamalla Nee" | P. Jayachandran | Sreekumaran Thampi | |
| 3 | "Ee Gaanathil" | K. J. Yesudas, Vani Jairam | Sreekumaran Thampi | |
| 4 | "Kathirmandapam" (F) | P. Susheela | Sreekumaran Thampi | |
| 5 | "Kathirmandapam" (M) | K. J. Yesudas | Sreekumaran Thampi | |
