= Mottu =

- Directed by: Joy
- Starring: Vijayaraghavan
- Cinematography: G. Kutty
- Edited by: G. Bhaskaran
- Release date: 7 July 1985
- Country: India
- Language: Malayalam

Mottu is a 1985 Indian Malayalam film, directed by Joy. The film stars Vijayaraghavan in the lead role.

== Cast ==
- Vijayaraghavan as Firoz
- Idavela Babu as Saju
- Manoj
- Priyatha
