= Ethirppukal =

- Directed by: Unni Aranmula
- Written by: Unni Aranmula
- Screenplay by: Unni Aranmula
- Produced by: Unni Aranmula
- Starring: Mammootty; Urvashi; Ratheesh; Shankar
- Cinematography: Dhananjayan
- Music by: T. S. Radhakrishnan
- Release date: 17 February 1984
- Country: India
- Language: Malayalam

Ethirppukal is a 1984 Indian Malayalam film directed and produced by Unni Aranmula. It stars Mammootty, Urvashi, Ratheesh, and Shankar in the lead roles. The film features a musical score by T. S. Radhakrishnan.

== Plot ==
Raghu (Ratheesh), who murders Bhargavan Pilla to avenge his brother's death. When Kochubaby (Mammootty) discovers that Bhargavan Pilla is actually his father, he chooses to take the blame for the murder.

== Cast ==
- Mammootty as Kochu Baby
- Ratheesh as Raghu
- Shankar as Ravi
- Menaka as Lakshmi
- Urvashi as Sudha
- Jalaja as Geetha
- Sukumari as Geetha's mother
- Manavalan Joseph as Kurup
- Adoor Bhavani as Bhargaviyamma
- Alummoodan as Pathros
- Aroor Sathyan as Thankappan
- Bahadoor as Achyuthan Pilla
- Jagannatha Varma as Bhargavan Pilla
- Mala Aravindan as Ayyappan
- Meena as Ravi's mother
- P. K. Abraham as Thavalam Chandran Pilla
- Pankajavalli as Meenakshiyamma
- Philomina as Bharathiyamma
- Santhakumari as Mariya
- Alleppey Ashraf as Raghu's uncle
- Ravi Gupthan as Mathai
- Vijayan as Raghu's friend
- Vijayalakshmi as Janamma

== Soundtrack ==
The music for the film was composed by T.S. Radhakrishnan, and the lyrics were written by Unni Aranmula.

No.	Song	Singers	Lyrics	Length (m:ss)
1	"Manassoru Maaya Prapancham"	K. J. Yesudas	Unni Aranmula	
2	"Poonullum Kaatte"	Vani Jairam	Unni Aranmula	
3	"Thirakal Thiramaalakal"	Gopan	Unni Aranmula	
