= Alleppey Ashraf =

Indian filmmaker

- Born: Alappuzha, Kerala, India
- Occupations: Director; screenwriter; actor; producer; dubbing artist; mimicry artist
- Years active: 1976 – present

Alleppey Ashraf is an Indian film director, producer and distributor working mainly in Malayalam cinema. He started his career as an impressionist and later a dubbing artist. He has also directed several films.

== Filmography ==
=== Director ===
His filmography includes:

Year	Film	Language	Cast	Notes
1983	Oru Madapravinte Katha	Malayalam	Prem Nazir, Mammootty	
1984	Vanitha Police	Malayalam	Prem Nazir, Seema, Mohanlal	
1985	Mukhyamanthri	Malayalam	Prem Nazir, Shankar, Menaka, Srividya	
1985	Paara	Malayalam	Bheeman Raghu, Kalpana, Jagathy Sreekumar	
1986	Ninnishtam Ennishtam	Malayalam	Mohanlal, Priya	
1986	Viswasichaalum Illenkilum	Malayalam	Shankar, Ratheesh, Lizy	
1987	Kottum Kuravayum	Malayalam	Mammootty, Ratheesh	
1990	Minda Poochakku Kalyanam	Malayalam	Suresh Gopi, Lizy	
1991	MGR Nagaril	Tamil	Anand Babu, Sukanya, Vivek, Charle, Shankar	Remake of In Harihar Nagar
1995	Neela Kuyil	Tamil	Pandiarajan, Rajashree	
2001	Ennum Sambhavaami Yuge Yuge	Malayalam	Srividya, Shalu Menon, Riyaz Pathanapuram	
2011	Ninnishtam Ennishtam 2	Malayalam	Suresh Nair, Sunitha, Priya	Sequel of Ninnishtam Ennishtam

=== Producer ===
- Minda Poochakku Kalyanam
- www.anukudumbam.com
- The Truth (1998 film)

=== Dialogue writer ===
- Oru Madapravinte Katha
- Mukhya Manthri
- Paara
- Oru Muthassikkadha
- Minda Poochakku Kalyanam
- Ennum Sambhavaami Yuge Yuge

=== Story writer ===
- Oru Madapravinte Katha
- Mukhya Manthri
- Paara
- Minda Poochakku Kalyanam
- Ennum Sambhavaami Yuge Yuge

=== Screenplay writer ===
- Oru Madapravinte Katha
- Mukhya Manthri
- Paara
- Ennum Sambhavaami Yuge Yuge

=== Actor ===
- Honey Bee 2.5 (2017) as Himself
- Honey Bee 2 Celebrations (2017) as Capt. Francis
- Kavi Uddheshichathu..? (2016) as Binukuttan
- Avarude Veedu
- Ithu Manthramo Thanthramo Kuthanthramo (2013)
- Paattinte Palazhy (2010)
- Changathippocha (2007)
- Mahasamudram (2006) as Doctor
- Aparanmaar Nagarathi (2001) as Doctor
- Jananayakan (1999)
- Devadasi (1999)
- Aaraam Thampuran (1997) as Jayaraman
- Guru (1997)
- Bhaaratheeyam (1997)
- Nirnayam (1995)
- Aakasha Kottayile Sultan (1991)
- Ee Kanni Koodi (1990)
- Ramji Rao Speaking (1989) as Chemmeen Varghese
- Ethirppukal (1984) as Raghu's uncle
- Vanitha Police (1984) as Director Keshavan
- Arikkari Ammu (1981)
- Attimari (1981)
- Prema Geethangal (1981)
- Kilinjalgal (TAMIL) (1981)
- Aniyatha Valakkal (1980)
- Theekkadal (1980)
- Dweepu (1977)

== TV Serial ==
- Kanalppoovu (Kairali TV)
- Thenum Vayambum (Surya TV)

== Dubbing career ==
Year	Film	Dubbed for	character
1980	Choola	P. J. Antony	
1980	Manushya Mrugam	Jayan	Babu & Gopy
1981	Ariyappedatha Rahasyam	Jayan	Raghu
1981	Aakkramanam	Jayan	Aravindan
1981	Sanchari	Jayan	Bhargavan
1981	Kolilakkam	Jayan	Rajan
1981	Garjanam	Rajinikanth	Dr.Vijay
2017	Baahubali 2: The Conclusion(Malayalam)	Subbaraju	Kumaravarma

== Production ==
- Oru Muthassi Katha
- In Harihar Nagar
