= Priya (actress) =

Indian actress

- Born: Karpagavalli; 21 March 1962 (age 64)
- Other name: Priyasri
- Occupation: Actress
- Years active: 1983–1995; 2001–present
- Spouse: David (m. 1995)
- Children: Prince; Aishwarya

Karpagavalli, better known by her stage name Priya, is an Indian actress who worked on South Indian movies. She was a prominent lead actress during the 1980s and 1990s in Malayalam films.

== Background ==
Priya hails from Teynampet, Tamil Nadu. She was noted for her performance in the Malayalam film Ninnishtam Ennishtam in 1986. She is married to David, a cinematographer of Malayalam movies. The couple have a son, Prince and a daughter, Aishwarya.

== Partial filmography ==
=== Malayalam ===
Year	Title	Role	Notes
1981	Saahasam		
1982	Preeyasakhi Radha		
1984	Enganeyundashane	Dancer	
1985	Boeing Boeing	Dancer	
1986	Adiverukal	Selvi	
1986	Prathyekam Sradhikkuka	Sophia	
1986	Snehamulla Simham	Lathika	
1986	Ninnishtam Ennishtam	Shalini	
1986	Padayani	Rajini	
1986	Pappan Priyappetta Pappan	Dancer	
1986	Shobhraj	Julie	
1986	Gandhinagar 2nd Street		
1986	Geetham	Lekha	
1986	Sukhamo Devi	Dr. Ambikadmajan Nair's wife	
1986	Dheem Tharikida Thom	Suresh's wife	
1986	Aval Kaathirunnu Avanum		
1986	Mazha Peyyunnu Maddalam Kottunnu	Aruna	
1986	Ente Sonia		
1987	Ivare Sookshikkuka		
1987	Ayitham	Kasthuri	
1987	Archanappookkal	Sumithra	
1987	January Oru Orma		
1988	Oohakachavadam	Naseema	
1988	Oru Vivaada Vishayam	Yamunadevi	
1988	Chaaravalayam	Thumbi	
1988	Moonnam Mura	Ali Imran's sister	
1988	Aryan	Savithri	
1988	Samvalsarangal		
1989	Mrigaya	Yashodha	
1989	Jeevitham Oru Raagam	Sharada	
1989	Kaalalppada	IAS Officer's wife (Ponnu Chakkara)	
1989	Pooram	Sushamma	
1989	Varum Varathikkilla	Sumithra	
1989	Krooran		
1989	Kaliyuga Seetha		
1990	Rajavazhcha	Aleykutty	
1990	Mukham	Prema	
1990	Malootty		
1990	Niyamam Enthucheyyum	Priya	
1990	Kadathanadan Ambadi	Unichara's daughter	
1990	Wait a Minute		
1991	Koumara Swapnangal		
2001	Ninneyum Thedi		
2002	Njan Rajavu	Rose Mary	
2002	Miss Suvarna		
2002	Manivarnathooval		
2011	Ninnishtam Ennishtam 2	Shalini (Chikku)	
2012	Vaidooryam		
2012	Manthrikan		
2012	Gramam	Nechumu/Lakshmiyamma	
2013	Police Maman	Celina	
2015	Dum Biriyani		

=== Tamil ===
Year	Title	Role	Notes
1983	Naalu Perukku Nandri		Uncredited role
1984	Pozhuthu Vidinchachu	Dancer	
1985	Chinna Veedu		
1985	Unakkaga Oru Roja		
1988	Solla Thudikkuthu Manasu	Jaya / Thenmozhi	
1988	Kunguma Kodu		
1989	Nyaya Tharasu		
1990	Velai Kidaichuduchu		
1990	Nalla Kaalam Porandaachu	Rosy	
1991	Gnana Paravai		
1994	Pathavi Pramanam		
1995	Bombay		
2007	Thirutham	Velmurugan's mother	
2007	Thee Nagar		
2008	Anjathe	Sathyavan's mother	
2008	Thodakkam		
2009	Mayandi Kudumbathar	Azhagamma	
2014	Namma Gramam	Nechumu/Lakshmiyamma	
2017	Motta Shiva Ketta Shiva		

=== Hindi ===
Year	Title	Role	Notes
1990	Gulabi Raaten		
1993	Platform		
1995	Raja Rani's Love in Jungle		
1996	Krishna		
1997	Chachi 420		
2004	Khakee		
2004	Tum?: A Dangerous Obsession		

=== Kannada ===
Year	Title	Role	Notes
1989	Yuddha Kaanda		
1998	Agnisakshi		

=== Telugu ===
Year	Title	Role	Notes
1986	Vijrumbhana		
1989	Shiva		

== Television ==
Year	Title	Role	Channel	Language
2003–2005	Adugiran Kannan		Sun TV	Tamil
2005–2006	Thavam		Sun TV	Tamil
2005–2006	Selvi		Sun TV	Tamil
2005–2006	Deerga Sumangali		Sun TV	Tamil
2005–2006	Karthavyam	Vasantha	Gemini TV	Telugu
2005–2006	Ketti Melam		Jaya TV	Tamil
2005–2007	Nimmathy		Sun TV	Tamil
2007–2008	Chellamadi Nee Enakku		Sun TV	Tamil
2007–2009	Vasantham		Sun TV	Tamil
2007–2010	Magal	Madhavi	Sun TV	Tamil
2007–2013	Thirumathi Selvam	Chintamani	Sun TV	Tamil
2008–2010	Bhuvaneshwari		Sun TV	Tamil
2009–2010	Karunamanjari		Raj TV	Tamil
2009	Enge Brahmanan		Jaya TV	Tamil
2010	Abhirami		Kalaignar TV	Tamil
2010–2011	Sundarakanda	Priya	Gemini TV	Telugu
2010–2011	Asoakavanam		Polimer TV	Tamil
2012–2017	Bhairavi Aavigalukku Priyamanaval	Saraswathi	Sun TV	Tamil
2012–2013	My Name Is Mangamma	Mangamma's mother	Zee Tamil	Tamil
2012–2014	Valli	Lakshmi	Sun TV	Tamil
2013	Parasparam	Kanchana	Asianet	Malayalam
2013–2014	Pasamalar		Sun TV	Tamil
2014–2017	Vamsam	Vasantha	Sun TV	Tamil
2014	Kannamoochi : 10 Mani Kathaigal		Puthuyugam TV	Tamil
2014	Celebrity Kitchen	Guest	Puthuyugam TV	Tamil
2016	Pagal Nilavu	Vadivu	Vijay TV	Tamil
2016–2017	Arundhati	Ambika	Raj TV	Tamil
2017	Mahalakshmi	Janaki	Sun TV	Tamil
2017–2019	Chinna Thambi	Kanchana	Star Vijay	Tamil
2017–2018 & 2020	Poove Poochudava	Sujatha	Zee Tamil	Tamil
2018–2019	Kalyana Parisu 2	Karpagam	Sun TV	Tamil
2019	Thaazhampoo		Star Vijay	Tamil
2019–2020	Rettai Roja	Kavitha	Zee Tamil	Tamil
2020	Aranmanai Kili	Special Appearance	Star Vijay	Tamil
2020	Tamil Selvi	Rajeshwari	Sun TV	Tamil
2020	Baakiyalakshmi	Karpagam	Star Vijay	Tamil
2021	Roja	Devi	Sun TV	Tamil
2021	Anbudan Kushi	Senthamarai	Star Vijay	Tamil
2021–2023	Thendral Vandhu Ennai Thodum	Kamala	Star Vijay	Tamil
2021–2022	Geethanjali		Raj TV	Tamil
2022	Chandralekha	Meenakshi	Sun TV	Tamil
2022–2023	Thavamai Thavamirundhu	Savithri	Zee Tamil	Tamil
2023–2024	Nala Damayanthi	Nayagi	Zee Tamil	Tamil
2024	Malli	Sivagami	Sun TV	Tamil
2024–2025	Ranjani	Lakshmi	Sun TV	Tamil
2024–2025	Sakthivel: Theeyaai Oru Theeraa Kaadhal	Azhagammai	Star Vijay	Tamil
2025–2026	Poongatru Thirumbuma	Kamatchi	Star Vijay	Tamil
