= Bindhu =

1985 film

- Directed by: Mookkannoor Sebastian
- Written by: Mookkannoor Sebastian
- Screenplay by: Mookkannoor Sebastian
- Produced by: Mookkannoor Sebastian
- Music by: Peter; Reuben
- Release date: 20 June 1985
- Country: India
- Language: Malayalam

Bindhu is a 1985 Indian Malayalam film, directed and produced by Mookkannoor Sebastian. The film has musical score by Peter and Reuben.

== Soundtrack ==
The music was composed by Peter and Reuben and the lyrics were written by Bharanikkavu Sivakumar.

No.	Song	Singers	Lyrics	Length (m:ss)
1	"Athappoo Vayalile"	P. Jayachandran, Chorus	Bharanikkavu Sivakumar	
2	"Bhaaratha Naadin"	S. Janaki, Chorus	Bharanikkavu Sivakumar	
3	"Chaithanyame"	S. Janaki	Bharanikkavu Sivakumar	
4	"Jeevitha Bandhangal"	Sahadevan	Bharanikkavu Sivakumar	
5	"Kadalippoovinte"	S. Janaki, P. Jayachandran	Bharanikkavu Sivakumar	
6	"Poovilikal"	S. Janaki	Bharanikkavu Sivakumar	
