= Utsavamelam =

- Poster
- Directed by: Suresh Unnithan
- Written by: K. S. Bhasurachandran
- Story by: Urvashi
- Produced by: Raghu, Ambili
- Starring: Suresh Gopi; Urvashi; Narendra Prasad; Innocent; Jagathy Sreekumar; Kuthiravattam Pappu; Mala Aravindan; Manoj K Jayan; Indrans
- Cinematography: K.P. Nambyathiri
- Music by: Mohan Sithara; O. N. V. Kurup (Lyrics)
- Production company: Anugraha Cine Arts
- Distributed by: Casio Productions
- Release date: 29 August 1992
- Running time: 160 minutes
- Country: India
- Language: Malayalam

Utsavamelam (The Sound of Festival) is a 1992 Indian Malayalam-language film directed by Suresh Unnithan and written by K. S. Bhasurachandran. The rivalry between two families and the unexpected middle man in these issues is the main theme of the film.

The film was a moderate success.

== Plot ==
Thekkumpuram and Vadakkumpuram are rival branches of an aristocratic family in the village, and the focal point for their clashes is the right over the village temple and its festivals. It is apparent that there is no near resolution of the conflict as well as no room for negotiation between them. However, the annual festival in the village must go on and every year and it renews the confrontation between these two families and their supporters which apparently divided the village dangerously between two rivaling factions. The rights for the year's festival go to Vadakkumpuram family in a negotiation proposed by respected "Thirumeni" of the village.

== Cast ==
- Suresh Gopi as Jayadevan
- Urvashi as Kanakaprabha
- Unnimary as Sreedevi
- Sankaradi as Thekkumpuram Karnavar
- Manoj K. Jayan as Bhagavathar
- Babu Namboothiri as Velichappadu
- Narendra Prasad as Thirumeni
- Jagathy Sreekumar as Thankappan/Manoj Kumar
- Indrans as Gopalan
- Mamukkoya as Nair
- KPAC Lalitha as Kalyaniamma
- Kollam Thulasi as Sankaran
- Usha as Ashwathi
- Meena Ganesh as Aswathi's mother
- Valsala Menon as Ammukuttyamma
- Innocent as Kamalasanana Kuruppu
- Nayana as Kalyani Kutty
- Poojappura Radhakrishnan
- Zeenath as Kanakaprabha's foster mother
- Unny Mery as Sreedevi
- N. L. Balakrishnan as Kuruppu
- Mala Aravindan
- Ravi Vallathol as Madhavankutty
- Jagannathan as Govinda Menon
- Kuthiravattam Pappu
- Alummoodan as DKP
- Syama as Shalini
- Aliyar as Viswam
- Haisham
- Kailas Nath

== Soundtrack ==
The film's soundtrack was composed by Mohan Sithara, with lyrics penned by O. N. V. Kurup. The album features eight songs, incorporating various classical ragas in its compositions. Sujatha Mohan received the Kerala Film Critics Association Award for Best Female Playback Singer for her renditions in this film.

Soundtrack Album
#	Song	Singers
1	"Ammaykkoru Ponnum Kudam"	Sujatha Mohan
2	"Amme Gange Mandaakini"	K. J. Yesudas
3	"Kanaka Manimaya" (Nata)	Sujatha Mohan
4	"Kasavulla Pattuduthu" (Madhyamavathi)	Sujatha Mohan
5	"Kunnirangi"	Sujatha Mohan
6	"Oru Vakkilellaam"	K. J. Yesudas
7	"Raamaa Sreeraama" (Valachi)	Jagathy Sreekumar
8	"Unni Kumaara" (Mohanam)	K. J. Yesudas
