= Mundhanai Mudichu =

1983 film by K. Bhagyaraj

- Theatrical release poster
- Directed by: K. Bhagyaraj
- Written by: K. Bhagyaraj
- Produced by: M. Kumaran; M. Saravanan; M. Balasubramanian
- Starring: K. Bhagyaraj; Urvashi
- Cinematography: Ashok Kumar
- Edited by: A. Selvanathan
- Music by: Ilaiyaraaja
- Production company: AVM Productions
- Release date: 22 July 1983
- Running time: 150 minutes
- Country: India
- Language: Tamil

Mundhanai Mudichu (transl. Saree Knot) is a 1983 Indian Tamil-language romantic comedy film directed and written by K. Bhagyaraj, who also stars alongside Urvashi in what is credited as her first movie in a lead role. The film focuses on a mischievous village girl who falls in love with a widower who works as a teacher in the village. She plots to force him into marrying her by falsely accusing him of having had sex with her, but she has to take drastic steps to win his love.

Bhagyaraj based the story of Mundhanai Mudichu on his friend who lost his wife, and a woman who fell in love with him even as others started gossiping about them. Another inspiration was a poster of Ramu (1966) which depicted its protagonist as a single father, and Bhagyaraj imagining himself in that position. The film was produced by AVM Productions, photographed by Ashok Kumar and edited by A. Selvanathan. It was the first Tamil film for Urvashi.

Mundhanai Mudichu was released on 22 July 1983 and became a major box office success, netting ₹40 million against a budget of ₹3 million and running for over 25 weeks in theatres, thus becoming a silver jubilee film. It won the Cinema Express Award for Best Film – Tamil, and Bhagyaraj won the Filmfare Award for Best Actor – Tamil. The film was remade in Telugu as Moodu Mullu (1983), in Hindi as Masterji (1985) and in Kannada as Halli Meshtru (1992).

== Plot ==
Parimalam, a school drop-out, is a mischievous and nubile girl who perennially plays pranks on unsuspecting people in her village, aided by her gang of preteen boys. These pranks often end her and the gang in the panchayat, which is headed by her father. An unnamed man with an infant child is appointed as the new teacher of the village's only school. When he comes to the village with his infant for the job, he is not spared from Parimalam's pranks upon his arrival. Shanmugamani, the teacher, takes classes by holding the book in one hand and rocking the cradle with the other in the classroom, much to the amusement of the villagers who call him "Vaathiyar" (transl. teacher).

Parimalam's playful nature transforms into love when she learns that Shanmugamani is a widower. She tries many ways to win his love, but fails every time. Shanmugamani believes that a stepmother would not take proper care of his child from his first wife, and even rejects a proposal to marry his deceased wife's sister. The deceased wife's last words – that he should take care of the child well after she dies – keep echoing in his ears often. Parimalam visits Shanmugamani and openly requests him to marry her, but he rejects her and throws her out. Deciding to marry him by any means possible, she lies to her father and the villagers that Shanmugamani had sex with her, knowing that the panchayat would order him to marry her to preserve her chastity.

A public trial is held, during which Parimalam is questioned if Shanmugamani had had sex with her. She commits perjury, and Shanmugamani is forced to marry her. In revenge, he stipulates that Parimalam has to remain a virgin for life as punishment for cheating him. He does not treat her as his wife. However, Parimalam is persistent and does everything possible to come closer to him. She relentlessly tries to seduce him by unconventional methods that prove to be testing times for Shanmugamani.

Shanmugamani's former mother-in-law gives him a metal trunk box, belonging to her late daughter. Not knowing its contents, he sends it home to Parimalam. When Parimalam opens the box, she finds jewels and costly sarees owned by Shanmugamani's late wife. She dons the jewellery and goes to brag about it to her village friends. Meanwhile, Shanmugamani's son swallows a coin while playing with a neighbour, and Parimalam gets the child to take home. The child becomes sick, and is saved by the village doctor at the last minute. Angered that Parimalam's carelessness almost killed his son, Shanmugamani banishes Parimalam, and she is taken to her father's home.

Weeks later, Shanmugamani discovers the truth regarding the coin incident, and feels sorry for Parimalam. When Shanmugamani fights with some people who are not supplying mid-day meals adequately to the schoolchildren and is almost stabbed, she saves his life by holding the edge of the knife. She suffers deep cuts on her hands and Shanmugamani takes her back and nurses her to recovery. He also tries to take out Parimalam, but once they leave, the photo of his deceased wife falls and breaks due to wind. Shanmugamani takes this as a bad omen and stops the plan. He also saves one of his students, who was about to be killed by his stepmother. He fears such treatment for his son in future.

Parimalam understands why Shanmugamani is hesitating to consummate the marriage; he fears she would ignore and mistreat his son when she has a child of her own. She decides to undergo sterilisation to gain his confidence and gets admitted into a hospital. By then, Shanmugamani learns of this and rushes to the hospital to stop it as he now understands her good intentions and does not want her to suffer. He reaches the hospital to find Parimalam unconscious on the bed and assumes she has already undergone treatment. However, the doctor assures him that she has not been operated as he found her to be a virgin and realised that she must have wanted the operation under duress. The couple unite and consummate their marriage.

== Cast ==
- K. Bhagyaraj as Shanmugamani
- Urvashi as Parimalam
- Poornima Jayaram as Sharadha (guest appearance)
- Deepa as Pattu
- K. K. Soundar as Nallasivam Gounder
- Nalinikanth as Sekar
- Peeli Sivam as Dr. Ravi
- Renuka as Kamatchi, Parimalam's mother
- Sathya as Valli
- Sarala as Arukkani
- Master Suresh as Balu
- Chittibabu as Thavakkalai
- Bayilvan Ranganathan as Kumaresan
- Baby Sujitha as Raja (Shanmugamani's son)

== Production ==
A friend of K. Bhagyaraj had lost his wife, and refused to remarry. A woman had fallen in love with him and desired to marry him, leading to people in the town gossiping about them. Bhagyaraj asked himself if it was wrong for a woman to love a widower, and this laid the foundation for Mundhanai Mudichu. Another inspiration for the story was a poster of Ramu (1966) that Bhagyaraj had seen as a child. The poster featured the protagonist with his motherless son. Bhagyaraj wondered how it would be if he himself were in that position, and prepared the story of Mundhanai Mudichu. Unlike Ramu, the protagonist's son was written as an infant rather than a preteen. M. Saravanan of AVM Productions agreed to produce the film after he was impressed with Bhagyaraj narrating the whole script all by himself without the paper. Bhagyaraj initially titled it as Chinna Veedu but changed it to Mundhanai Mudichu after Saravanan did not like the initial title. Cinematography was handled by Ashok Kumar, and editing by A. Selvanathan.

Originally, Kalaranjini accepted to be the lead actress. However, she later declined as she could not set aside two months as asked to. Bhagyaraj then offered the role to her 13 year-old sister Urvashi who accepted, making her Tamil debut. Kovai Sarala, then a class X student, portrayed a 30-something pregnant woman. The film was made at a cost of ₹3 million (equivalent to ₹55 million or US$580,000 in 2026). Saravanan said Bhagyaraj "took two months to write the script. He had everything planned out to the last-minute costume change." After the film was completed, Bhagyaraj locked himself with his editor and "with a staple gun and a pair of scissors he stitched all this material together". Significant portions of the film were shot in Olapalayam, a village near Gobichettipalayam. The teacher's house was actually a set built by the crew of the film. Bhagyaraj also made people from Olapalayam portray minor roles and extras.

== Soundtrack ==
The music was composed by Ilaiyaraaja. The song "Andhi Varum Neram" is set in the Carnatic raga Mayamalavagowla, and "Chinnanjiru Kiliye" is set in Charukesi. The soundtrack had six songs but only five songs were used in the film.

Tamil track listing
No.	Title	Lyrics	Singer(s)	Length
1.	"Andhi Varum Neram"	Gangai Amaran	S. P. Balasubrahmanyam, S. Janaki	5:13
2.	"Chinnanjiru Kiliye"	Muthulingam	S. P. Balasubrahmanyam, S. Janaki	4:18
3.	"Kanna Thorakanum"	Gangai Amaran	S. Janaki, Malaysia Vasudevan	4:34
4.	"Naan Pudicha Mappilae"	Pulamaipithan	S. Janaki, S. P. Sailaja	4:30
5.	"Vaa Vaa Vaathiyare"	Gangai Amaran	S. P. Sailaja, Malaysia Vasudevan	3:51
6.	"Velakku Vetcha"	Na. Kamarasan	Ilaiyaraaja, S. Janaki	3:53
Total length:				26:19

Telugu track listing
No.	Title	Singer(s)	Length
1.	"Thalapula Raagam"	S. P. Balasubrahmanyam, P. Susheela	5:13
2.	"Chinni Chinni Kanna Chinnari"	S. P. Balasubrahmanyam, P. Susheela	4:18
3.	"Kannu Theravara Swami"	S. P. Balasubrahmanyam, P. Susheela	4:34
4.	"Koboye Naa Mogudu"	P. Susheela	4:30
5.	"Raa Raa Panthulayya"	S. P. Sailaja, S. P. Balasubrahmanyam	3:51
6.	"Gadasari Naa Mava Vacchade"	S. P. Balasubrahmanyam, P. Susheela	3:53
Total length:			26:19

== Release and reception ==
Mundhanai Mudichu was released on 22 July 1983. On 7 August 1983, the review board of Ananda Vikatan said only Bhagyaraj could transform a short story into a beautiful film through his good treatment, and he proved to be a master in that, and also praised Urvashi's performance, rating the film 50 out of 100. Made at a cost of ₹3 million (equivalent to ₹55 million or US$580,000 in 2026), it netted ₹40 million (equivalent to ₹740 million or US$7.7 million in 2026), setting a new southern box office record at that time. According to Saravanan, the film was released in 49 centres, it ran for 100 days in 43 centres and scored silver jubilee in 12 centres. It was the first film to run for 25 weeks in four Madras theatres and 10 other centres all over the south, becoming a silver jubilee film; an event to mark the silver jubilee was held on 25 March 1984, with the-then Chief Minister of Tamil Nadu, M. G. Ramachandran present. Mundhanai Mudichu was the first Tamil film to celebrate its silver jubilee in Trivandrum. The film won the Cinema Express Award for Best Film – Tamil, and Bhagyaraj won the Filmfare Award for Best Actor – Tamil.

== Other versions ==
Mundhanai Mudichu was remade in Telugu as Moodu Mullu (1983) and dubbed in the same language as Vaadante Pelli. Its Hindi remake rights were sold for ₹500,000 (equivalent to ₹9.2 million or US$96,000 in 2026), the highest ever paid for a remake rights of a Tamil film at that time; the Hindi remake, Masterji, was released in 1985, and the Kannada remake Halli Meshtru in 1992. In May 2020, it was announced that M. Sasikumar would star in a Tamil remake, and Aishwarya Rajesh joined as the female lead. The screenplay would again be written by Bhagyaraj.

== Legacy ==
The scene where Parimalam prepares an entire dinner based on drumsticks to improve the sexual relations between her and Shanmugamani attained popularity, leading to increased sales in drumsticks. A sequel to Mundhanai Mudichu, titled Mappillai Vinayagar, was being shot by 2013 with Lollu Sabha Jeeva portraying Shanmugamani's son, but the film failed to have a theatrical release.

== Bibliography ==
- Dhananjayan, G. (2011). The Best of Tamil Cinema, 1931 to 2010: 1977–2010. Galatta Media. OCLC 733724281.
- Saravanan, M. (2013) [2005]. AVM 60 Cinema (in Tamil) (3rd ed.). Rajarajan Pathippagam. OCLC 1158347612.
- Sundararaman (2007) [2005]. Raga Chintamani: A Guide to Carnatic Ragas Through Tamil Film Music (2nd ed.). Pichhamal Chintamani. OCLC 295034757.
