= Dwik Vijayam =

Digvijayam
- Directed by: M. Krishnan Nair
- Produced by: P. K. Kaimal
- Starring: Prem Nazir; Srividya; Adoor Bhasi; Hari
- Cinematography: U. Rajagopal
- Edited by: M. S. Mani
- Music by: G. Devarajan
- Production company: Thirumeni Pictures
- Distributed by: Thirumeni Pictures
- Release date: 1 August 1980
- Country: India
- Language: Malayalam

Dwik Vijayam (transl. Conquest of All Directions) is a 1980 Indian Malayalam film, directed by M. Krishnan Nair and produced by P. K. Kaimal. The film stars Prem Nazir, Srividya, Adoor Bhasi and Hari in the lead roles. The film has musical score by G. Devarajan.

== Cast ==
- Prem Nazir as Vasu
- Srividya as Soumini
- Adoor Bhasi as Kannappan
- K. P. Ummer as Viswambaran
- Hari
- Jose as Ravi
- Cochin Haneefa
- Sankaradi as Shankar Panikkar
- K.P.A.C. Sunny as Baskaran
- Ram Kumar
- Janardanan as Pankajakshan
- Seema as Uma
- Sukumari as College Principal
- Raji
- Sharmila

== Soundtrack ==
The music was composed by G. Devarajan and the lyrics were written by P. Bhaskaran.

No.	Song	Singers	Lyrics	Length (m:ss)
1	"Kanmani Oruvan"	K. J. Yesudas	P. Bhaskaran	
2	"Madhumaasa Nikunjathil"	K. J. Yesudas, P. Madhuri	P. Bhaskaran	
3	"Oru Sundarithan"	P. Jayachandran, P. Madhuri, Karthikeyan	P. Bhaskaran	
4	"Panchami Raavil" (Kaamante)	P. Jayachandran, P. Madhuri, Karthikeyan	P. Bhaskaran	
5	"Thaalam Aadithalam"	P. Madhuri	P. Bhaskaran	
