= Kannur Rajan =

Indian musician (1940–1995)

- Born: 24 June 1940; Kakkad, Malabar District, Madras Presidency, British India (present day Kannur, Kerala, India)
- Died: 7 April 1995 (aged 54); Chennai, Tamil Nadu, India
- Occupation: Music Composer
- Years active: 1974–1995
- Known for: Chithram (1988)
- Spouse: Swarnalatha
- Children: 3
- Relatives: Sharreth (son-in-law); K. K. Haridas (brother-in-law)

Kannur Rajan (24 June 1940 – 7 April 1995) was a music composer from Kerala, India. Though his songs are less in numbers, they are noted as emotional and nostalgic in the Malayalam film songs. He was the father-in-law of celebrated music director, Sharreth.

== Early life ==
Rajan was born in a poor family in Kakkad near Kannur. He entered Malayalam cinema in 1974 with his first music composition for the film Mister Sundary. He then composed music for around 50 films, working with all major lyricists and singers of Malayalam film industry. He was married twice. He had 3 sons in the first marriage with Swarnalatha. Then he married Vilasini and had three children. He died suddenly due to a massive heart attack while composing for a film titled Kokkarakko on 7 April 1995, aged 55. Malayalam film director K. K. Haridas was his brother-in-law.

== Filmography ==
Year	Movie	Lyrics
1974	Mister Sundari	Vayalar Ramavarma
1976	Abhinandanam	Sreekumaran Thampi
1977	Pallavi	P. Bhaskaran
1977	Choondakkari	Monu
1977	Oru Jathi Oru Matham	S Babu
1978	Padakkuthira	Mankombu Gopalakrishnan
1978	Beena	Bichu Thirumala
1978	Soundaryam	Yusuf Ali Kecheri
1978	Kshethram	Bharanikkavu Sivakumar
1983	Karyam Nissaram	Konniyoor Bhas
1984	Appunni	Bichu Thirumala
1984	Swantham Sharika	P Bhaskaran
1985	Akkare Ninnoru Maran	Priyadarshan
1985	Kiratham	Bharanikkavu Sivakumar
1985	Paara	Ilanthoor Vijayakumar
1985	Ente Ammu Ninte Thulasi Avarude Chakki	O.N.V. Kurup
1985-	Ushasse Unaroo	Poovachal Khader
1985	Bheekararathri	Ilanthoor Vijayakumar
1986	Surabhiyamangal	Madhu Alappuzha
1986	Bharya Oru Manthri	Pappanamkodu Lakshmanan
1986	Ninnishtam Ennishtam	Bichu Thirumala
1986	Poovinu Puthiya Poonthennal	Bichu Thirumala
1986	Katturumbinu Kathukuthu	Panthalam Sudakaran
1986	Ahalya	K. Jayakumar
1988	Onninu Purake Mattonnu	Puvachal Khader
1988	Chithram	Shibu Chakravarthy
1989	Ayiram Chirakulla Moham	George Thomas
1989	Omale Aromale	Mankombu Gopalakrishnan
1987	Puzhayorathoru Pujari	Thikkurissy Sukumaran Nair
1990	Shankaran Kuttikku Pennu Venam	Padmanabhan
1990	Thaalam	Mankombu Gopalakrishnan
1993	Kanyakumariyil Oru Kavitha	Chunakkara Ramankutty
1994	Vardhakya Puranam	S. Rameshan Nair, IS Kundoor
1994	Vadhu Doctoranu	Gireesh Puthenchery
1994	Kadalponnu	Gireesh Puthenchery
1995	Kokkarakko	Gireesh Puthenchery

== Albums ==
- Hridayanjali (1983)
- Ragaveena (1984)
- Swathanthrya Samara Gatha (1985) -Two songs
- Karvarnan (1992)
- Sreerama Ganamrutham (1992)
- Sruthilaya Tharangini (1993)
- Krishnanamam (1995)
