= Urvashi (actress) =

Indian actress

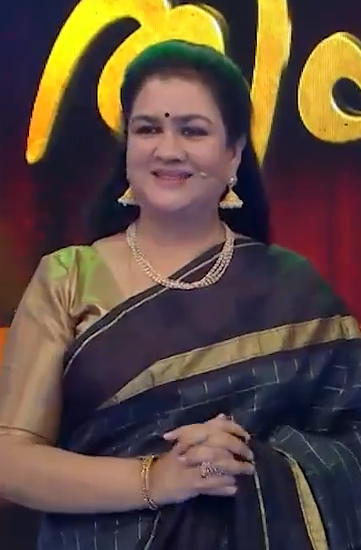
- Urvashi in 2022
- Born: Kavitha Renjini; Kollam, Kerala, India
- Occupation: Actress
- Works: Full list
- Spouses: Manoj K. Jayan (m. 2000; div. 2008); Shivaprasad (m. 2013)
- Children: 2
- Relatives: Sooranad Kunjan Pillai (grandfather); Kalaranjini (sister); Kalpana (sister)
- Awards: Full list

Kavitha Manoranjini, known professionally as Urvashi, is an Indian actress, dubbing artist, television host, screenwriter and film producer known for her work in the Indian film industry, predominantly in Malayalam and Tamil films, and also in Kannada and Telugu films. In a career spanning over four decades, she has won two National Film Awards, six Kerala State Film Awards, three Tamil Nadu State Film Awards and three Filmfare Award South. Known for her versatility, she is widely regarded as one of the greatest actresses in Indian cinema.

Urvashi was a prominent lead actress of the 1980s and 1990s, primarily in Malayalam Films. She has written the films Utsavamelam and Pidakkozhi Koovunna Noottandu; the latter was also produced by her. She has won the National Film Award for Best Supporting Actress twice: first for her role in Achuvinte Amma (2005), which marked her return to cinema after a six-year break, and again for her performance in Ullozhukku (2024). She has won the Kerala State Film Award for Best Actress a record six times, including three consecutive wins from 1989 to 1991. She has also received three Tamil Nadu State Film Awards including Tamil Nadu State Film Award Special Prize for Magalir Mattum (1994), Tamil Nadu State Film Honorary Kalaivanar Award and Tamil Nadu State Film Award for Best Comedian for Magalir Mattum (2017).

== Early and personal life ==
Urvashi was born to popular drama actors Chavara V. P. Nair and Vijayalakshmi at Sooranad in the Kollam district of Kerala. She is the granddaughter of famous Malayali writer Sooranad Kunjan Pillai. Her elder sisters are actors Kalaranjini and Kalpana. Her family was resettled to Thiruvananthapuram. Her two brothers, Kamal Roy and Prince, had also acted in a few Malayalam movies. Prince (who acted as Nandu in Layanam) committed suicide at the age of 17.

In 2016, her sister Kalpana was found unconscious in her hotel room and was immediately taken to the hospital, but died of a heart attack.

Her brother Kamal Roy (who acted as Ananthapadmanabhan in Kalyana Sougandhikam) died in 2026 at the age of 54 due to heart failure.

Urvashi studied at Fort Girls' Mission High School in Thiruvananthapuram until fourth grade and later at Corporation Higher Secondary School, Kodambakkam, until ninth grade, when the family shifted to Chennai.

Firstly, Urvashi was cast by director K.Bhagyaraj in his village-based film Mundhanai Mudichu. The film was successful and declared a super hit at the box office. She could not continue her studies since she had become busy with her movie career by then.

Urvashi married film actor Manoj K. Jayan on 2 May 2000. They have a daughter, Teja Lakshmi, born in November 2001. However, they got divorced in 2008. Urvashi then married Chennai-based builder Sivaprasad in November 2013. The couple had a boy, Ishaan Prajapathi, in August 2014.

== Career ==
She acted in around 350 films (upto 2025) in Malayalam, Tamil, Telugu, Kannada and Hindi. She started her acting career as a child artist, at the age of 10, in a Malayalam movie Kathirmandapam, released in 1979, as Jayabharathi's daughter. She acted as Srividya's dance student in the movie Dwik Vijayam, released in 1980, she plays Krishna in the song sequence Madhumaasa Nikunjathil, where her sister Kalpana plays Radha. She has also acted as a child artist in Ninaivukal Maraivathillai, a Tamil movie, in 1983, but it was never released. Then she acted as a heroine, at the age of 13, to Karthik in the movie Thodarum Uravu, which completed shooting in 1983, but released in 1986.

Her first released Tamil film as heroine was Mundhanai Mudichu directed by K. Bhagyaraj in 1983, making her debut movie. Ethirppukal in 1984 was one of her earlier films in Malayalam. During the peak of her career, she starred in M. P. Sukumaran Nair's award-winning film Kazhakam in 1995, without taking a single penny as remuneration. She was awarded Best Actress for this role. She has acted in some advertisements, and has participated in many stage shows also. She also hosted Kannada Show Krazy Couple on Zee Kannada.
