= P. Balakrishnan =

Indian filmmaker and screenwriter

Dr. P. Balakrishnan
- Born: Nellikode, Kozhikode
- Occupations: Doctor, Director, Producer and script writer
- Years active: 1967 – 2000
- Spouse: Radha Balakrishnan
- Children: 5

Dr. P. Balakrishnan was an Indian film screenwriter, lyricist, director and producer in Malayalam movies. He scripted story and dialogue for more than 50 movies. He has also directed and produced around 10 movies. His debut movie is Thalirukal in 1965. Renowned film director Satyan Anthikad started film career working as his assistant. He is also credited with introducing eminent film director I.V. Sasi and music director A. T. Ummer to the Malayalam film industry.

== Partial filmography ==
Year	Film	Dialogue	Story	Screenplay	Direction	Production
1967	Thalirukal	Yes	Yes	Yes	M.S. Mani	Reshmi Films
1968	Kaliyalla Kalyanam	Yes	Yes	Yes	A. B. Raj	T.P. Madhavan Nair
1973	Ladies Hostel	Yes	Yes	Yes	Hariharan (director)	Yes
1974	Nadeenadanmare Avasyamundu	Yes	Yes	Yes	Crossbelt Mani	C.P. Sreedharan, P. Appu Nair
1974	College Girl (1978 film)	Yes	Yes	Yes	Hariharan (director)	Yes
1974	Ayalathe Sundari	Yes	Hariharan (director)	Hariharan (director)	Hariharan (director)	G.P. Balan
1975	Madhurappathinezhu	Yes	Yes	Yes	Hariharan (director)	T. E. Vasudevan
1975	Love Letter (1975 film)	Yes	Yes	Yes	Yes	Yes
1975	Chandanachola	Yes	Yes	Yes	Jeassy	Yes
1975	Kalyaanappanthal	Yes	Yes	Yes	Yes	Roopakala
1975	Thaamarathoni	Yes	Yes	Yes	Crossbelt Mani	United Movies
1976	Madhuram Thirumadhuram	Yes	Yes	Yes	Yes	Ammini Madhavan
1976	Sindhooram (1976 film)	Yes	Yes	Yes	Jeassy	Rekha Cine Arts
1976	Kaadaaru Maasam				Yes	
1977	Manassoru Mayil	Yes	Yes	Yes	P. Chandrakumar	Rekha Cine Arts
1977	Sneha Yamuna	Yes	Yes	Yes	A. T. Raghu	Haseena Films Release
1977	Rajaparambara	Yes	Yes	Yes	Yes	M.P. Bhaskaran
1978	Jalatharangam (film)	Yes	Yes	Yes	P. Chandrakumar	
1979	Enikku Njaan Swantham	Yes	Yes	Yes	P. Chandrakumar	M. Mani
1979	Agni Vyooham	Yes	Yes	Yes	P. Chandrakumar	R.S. Prabhu
1979	Sarpam	Yes	Yes	Baby (director)	Baby (director)	Dhanya
1979	Evide En Prabhaatham				Yes	
1980	Kaavalmaadam	Yes	Yes	Kamal (director)	P. Chandrakumar	Santhosh Films
1980	Arangum Aniyarayum	Yes	Yes	Yes	P. Chandrakumar	R.S. Prabhu
1981	Poocha Sanyasi	Yes	Hariharan (director)	Hariharan (director)	Hariharan (director)	Hymavathy Movie Makers
1981	Danda Gopuram	John Paul (screenwriter)	John Paul (screenwriter)	Yes	P. Chandrakumar	Renjith Films
1982	Anuraagakkodathi	Yes	Yes	Yes	Hariharan (director)	Areefa Hassan
1982	Kurukkante Kalyanam	Yes	Yes	Yes	Sathyan Anthikad	Rasheeda Rasheed
1982	Beedi Kunjamma	Yes	Yes	Yes	K.G. Rajshekharan	K.G. Rajashekharan
1982	Sindoora Sandhyakku Mounam	Yes	Yes	Yes	I. V. Sasi	V.B.K. Menon
1983	Kinnaram	Yes	Yes	Yes	Sathyan Anthikad	Pratheeksha Productions
1983	Mandanmmar Londonil	Yes	Yes	Yes	Sathyan Anthikad	P.H. Rasheed
1984	Vikatakavi	Yes	Yes	Yes	Hariharan (director)	George
1984	Thathamme Poocha Poocha	Yes	Yes	Yes	Balu Kiriyath	P. K. R. Pillai
1984	Kaliyil Alpam Karyam	Yes	Yes	Yes	Sathyan Anthikad	Pavamani
1984	Veruthe Oru Pinakkam	Yes	Yes	Yes	Sathyan Anthikad	
1984	Vepraalam	Yes	Yes	Menon Suresh	Menon Suresh	P. K. R. Pillai
1985	Nayakan (1985 film)	Yes	Yes	Yes	Balu Kiriyath	P.H. Rasheed
1999	Prem Poojari	Yes	Yes	Hariharan (director)	Hariharan (director)	Hariharan (director)

=== Lyrics ===
- Ithuvare Pennoru ... Kaliyalla Kalyaanam 1968
- Maanasaveenayil ... Ladies Hostel 1973
- Chandanakkuriyitta ... College Girl 1974
- Kingini Ketti ... College Girl 1974
- Anjanamizhikal ... College Girl 1974
- Muthiyamma Pole Vannu ... College Girl 1974
- Amrithaprabhaatham Virinju ... College Girl 1974
- Arikathu Njammalu Bannotte ... College Girl 1974
- Oru Swapna Binduvil ... Vrindaavanam 1974
- Swargamandaarappookkal ... Vrindaavanam 1974
- Pattudayaada ... Vrindaavanam 1974
- Oru Thulli Madhu tha ... Vrindaavanam 1974
- Madhuvidhu Raathri ... Vrindaavanam 1974
- Bindu Neeyananda ... Chandanachola 1975
- Maniyaanchettikku ... Chandanachola 1975
- Bindu Neeyen Jeeva ... Chandanachola 1975 P Susheela
- Manavaattippenninallo ... Kalyaanappanthal 1975
- Kaashaaya Kaashellam ... Madhuram Thirumadhuram 1976
- Oru Nokku Devi ... Madhuram Thirumadhuram 1976
- Oh My Love My Love ... Madhuram Thirumadhuram 1976
- Naduvodinjoru mollaakka ... Madhuram Thirumadhuram 1976
- Kaathu Kaathu ... Manassoru Mayil 1977
- Hamse Sunlo ... Manassoru Mayil 1977
- Maanathoraaraattam ... Manassoru Mayil 1977
- Sandhye Nee Va Va Sindooram Tha Tha ... Snehikkan Samayamilla 1978
- Kuttappa Njan Achanalleda ... Snehikkan Samayamilla 1978
- Kaakkayennulla Vaakkinartham ... Jalatharangam 1978
- Sakhi Sakhi Chumbanam ... Jalatharangam 1978
