= Amrutham Gamaya =

1987 film

- Poster designed by P. N. Menon
- Directed by: Hariharan
- Written by: M. T. Vasudevan Nair
- Produced by: P. K. R. Pillai
- Starring: Mohanlal; Thilakan; Geetha; Parvathy Jayaram; Vineeth
- Cinematography: S. C. Padi
- Edited by: M. S. Mani
- Music by: M. B. Sreenivasan
- Production company: Shirdhi Sai Creations
- Distributed by: Shirdhi Sai Release
- Release date: 6 February 1987
- Country: India
- Language: Malayalam

Amrutham Gamaya, (translation: Path to immortality) is a 1987 Indian Malayalam-language epic psychological drama film directed by Hariharan, written by M. T. Vasudevan Nair and produced by P. K. R. Pillai. It features Mohanlal in the lead role, along with Geetha, Parvathy Jayaram, Vineeth, Thilakan, Devan, Babu Namboothiri and Karamana Janardanan Nair in major supporting roles. The film has no songs, but features a musical score composed by M. B. Sreenivasan.

This film is known for its poignant expression of guilt, it portrays with great sensitivity the story of a doctor who tries to atone for a mistake that he committed as a student – a mistake that destroyed a family. Amrutham Gamaya is regarded as one of the best films of Hariharan and one of the classic screenplay of Vasudevan Nair.

== Plot ==
The movie opens with the final year medical students taking the Hippocratic oath in the Medical college auditorium. Amongst them is Sreedevi, who wins a gold medal and the student of the year award. She takes her award straight to Haridas, who is a senior doctor and her sponsor, who is sitting and watching the function in a corner. She tells him that she is dedicating the award to him. They walk together and decide to visit to the village they belong to. They sit along the river bank and reminisce about their past.

Flashback

Dr P.K. Haridas and his widowed mother are on their way to his uncle's home. They drive past the Nila river, where they glimpse fleetingly at a stream of devotees in white offering Karkidaka Vavu Bali (a form of Hindu ritual in which offerings are made for the deceased to attain Moksha). His uncle, Kurup, leads the family, which has his four sons, a daughter and a daughter-in-law. Haridas is their poor cousin, the one whose education was funded by the uncle and therefore continually reminded by his meek mother to be indebted to them.

Haridas is supposed to marry Kurup's daughter Bhanu who is smart and educated. The uncle and his sons think they own him making him uncomfortable, so does their feudalistic attitude towards the lesser privileged. When a Muslim trader lashes at the uncle for using devious methods to get his shop, Haridas is more appalled by how the daughter, Bhanu, springs up in defence of her father. The eldest son, Suku is a real estate contractor, the second one moves around in political circles and the youngest, Raghu runs a medical shop. His cousins and uncle are extremely greedy.

When Haridas starts his practice at the local dilapidated clinic run by his uncle, he realises that he is up against a morally corrupt system, where the facilities are poor, and also that he does not have a say in its functioning. The other doctor at the clinic, Dr. Rajan Thomas cautions him against treating pregnant women, as it's his domain. They are against his honest practice and were disappointed when he denied prescribing unnecessary medicines to the poor because it did not help his brother's pharmacy business. But Haridas is very adamant in not yielding to their dishonesty and malpractices. Even though Bhanu looks at Haridas with stars in her eyes, he dismisses her all the time.

The past comes to haunt Haridas when he goes to a patient at her home – a derelict Namboothiri illam. The patient is bedridden, her husband Ilethu is a temple priest and they have a daughter Sreedevi. It is when Illethu mentions their departed son Unnikrishnan, who was a promising medical student, who had died due to a sudden heart attack in the playground at his medical college, Haridas gets a jolt. Haridas mentions that Unni was a junior of his. That night he injects pethidine to ease his pain and the guilt slowly starts to eat inside him. It slowly grows into an addiction.

Haridas grows attached to the family, often helping them. He advises Sreedevi to become a doctor, not a nurse. Meanwhile, at his uncle's home, he faces much trouble and shifts his home near the Namboothiri illam, using it as a clinic as well. Patients throng to his home and the bond between Sreedevi and Haridas becomes strong. When Bhanu arrives, she mistakes their friendship for something else and leaves the clinic in anger. But Haridas calms her down and tells her that it is his responsibility to take care of that family, as there is something in his past which she wouldn't understand. She calms down and then Haridas then drops her at her home, in front of her uncle and brothers. Meanwhile, his addiction grows and finally when his mentor, the wise old professor arrives and advises him, it is only then he stops injecting it. He discards the rest of the vials.

One night, a low-caste labourer calls upon Haridas as his pregnant wife is experiencing pains. He tells him that all pregnancy cases are undertaken by Dr Rajan Thomas and interfering in his domain would cause problems. But Dr Thomas does not go for the delivery and neglects them, as it is the birthday party of his child. Even after Haridas's request, he doesn't go. At last, Haridas himself tries to attend the case, but in vain. The woman dies due to severe bleeding and medical negligence by Dr Thomas. This becomes a huge issue and Haridas is made the scapegoat, thanks to a smear campaign by his uncle and cousins. The mob throws stones at his house and breaks the windows and Haridas is injured as well.

The next day, Illethu arrives to check on the well-being of Haridas. Haridas learns that they were going to perform the annual funeral of their son. Illethu mentions that death due to unnatural causes need a special pooja, as the aatma keeps lingering around for salvation. Haridas requests that such a pooja be conducted for their son, as he is the one responsible for Unni's death. Haridas then reveals everything to the appalled Illethu about that fateful night.

Back in college, Haridas was Unni's senior and all the new admissions were ragged by the unruly seniors. When Unni was staying in his room he was forced to come out. He begged them not to harass him as he was tested to have a weak heart. As Haridas wanted to show his power as a senior, he harasses Unni to strip in front of everyone and even mocks him and also the doctor who had diagnosed Unni's heart condition. Haridas repeatedly ignores his pleas. He orders him to carry him on his shoulders and go round the campus. Not able to carry Haridas's weight on his shoulders and due to the stress of ragging, Unni collapses and spits out blood. Unni writhes in pain and then dies. Horrified, Haridas tries to resuscitate him, but in vain. He panics and fumbles all over. All the students run back to their rooms when they see the professor(Haridas's mentor) arrive at the scene. Haridas falls to his legs and pleads with him not to reveal it. The management quickly covers it up as a playground accident.

Cutting to Haridas and Illethu, Haridas falls to Illethu's feet for forgiveness. Unni's family, who had earlier seen him as a saviour, now saw him as the bloodied, remorseless killer. Haridas looks on as the family finishes the last rites but totally crumbles when the mother accuses him of killing her son. Haridas, not able to live with himself tries to commit suicide. As he slits his wrist, writhing in pain and remorse, Sreedevi grabs his hands, her face swimming in tears and everything else she was holding back from him. As days go by, Sreedevi joins the Medical College with Haridas sponsoring her entire education.

Present day

Sreedevi and Haridas arrive at the Illam. Illethu had died and only the mother stayed there now. The mother extends a warm welcome to them, seeing that everything has become normal. She had forgiven him. Haridas then leaves with a smile on his face.

== Cast ==
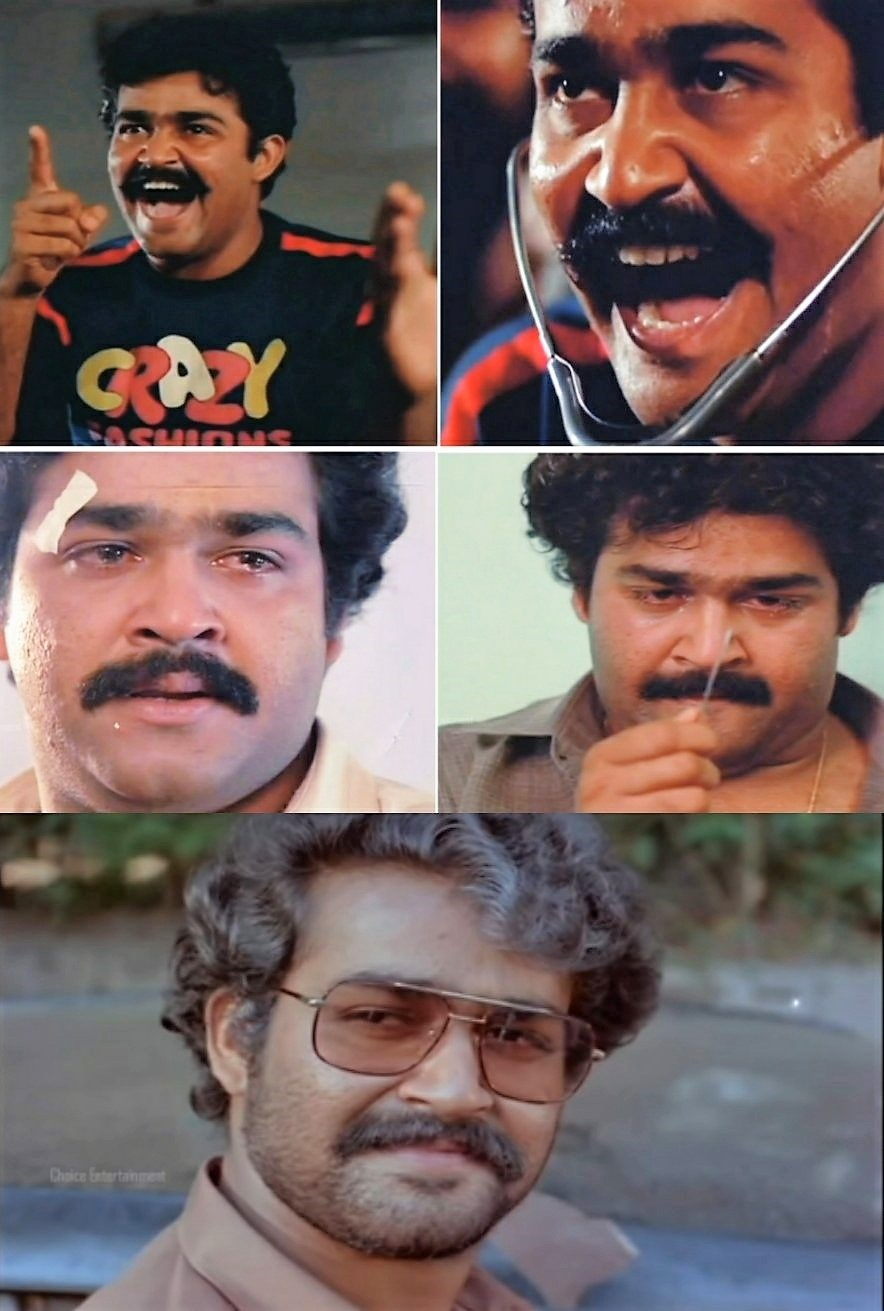
Mohanlal portrays the three stages of Dr. P.K. Haridas

- Mohanlal as Dr. P. K. Haridas
- Thilakan as Kurup, Haridas's maternal uncle
- Geetha as Bhanu
- Parvathy as Sreedevi, Unni's sister
- Vineeth as Unnikrishnan, son of Illethu, brother of Sreedevi
- Captain Raju as Suku, the eldest son of Kurup and Haridas's Brother-in-law
- Devan as Raghu, the son who runs the medical shop
- Kuthiravattom Pappu as Kumaran, the medical compounder/attender.
- Karamana Janardanan Nair as Professor Chandrashekharan Menon, Haridas's mentor.
- Rajya Lakshmi as Sarada, Haridas's Elder Sister and Suku's Wife
- Kunjandi as Kasim
- Babu Namboothiri as Illethu, Unni's father
- Kundara Johny as Dr Rajan Thomas, the arrogant and negligent doctor.
- Kamala Kamesh as Geetha, Sreedevi's mother
- Sukumari as Lathika, Haridas's mother

== Production ==
The film was written by M. T. Vasudevan Nair and directed by Hariharan. It was their subsequent collaboration with Mohanlal and Geetha together again after Panchagni (1986). Unlike Panchagni, which was a women-oriented film, Amrutham Gamaya follows the character of Dr. Haridas played by Mohanlal. The title is derived from the lyric "mṛtyor mā amṛtaṃ gamaya" (meaning: "From death, lead me to immortality") of the Pavamana Mantra, a Hindu mantra. The film score was composed by M. B. Sreenivasan. This film does not feature any songs. Actress Soumini, who played a small role as a nurse in this film, committed suicide during the shooting.

== Themes ==
The film explores the themes of guilt, depression, drug abuse, corruption, addiction, traditional Kerala family scepticisms and values and finally redemption through the psyche of the main protagonist. The title is derived from the popular shloka

"Asatho Maa Sad Gamaya"
"Thamaso Maa Jyothir Gamaya"
"Mrithyor Maa Amritham Gamaya",

which means

"Lead me from the unreal to the real."
"Lead me from darkness to light."
"Lead me from death to immortality."

The journey of Haridas, from his guilt-ridden days to acceptance and inner peace is the titular metaphorical path to immortality. Mohanlal portrays Haridas at three stages in his life as a young spoiled bully, the self-destructive doctor and finally as the man who attains redemption.

Neelima Menon of The News Minute writes, "Amrutham Gamaya is about second chances, about battling guilt, because when you allow it to consume you it has the capacity to cripple you for life. When a seemingly harmless ragging session leads to the death of his junior, Dr Haridas is devastated but his professor bails him out. Years later as a practitioner at a village clinic, the past gets back to him in the form of his poor neighbours who are the family of the deceased student."

== Release ==
The film was released on 6 February 1987.

== Reception ==
In November 2020, Neelima Menon of The News Minute wrote, "Amrutham Gamaya stars a brilliant Mohanlal in MT Vasudevan Nair's story about remorse." In an interview with Rediff in August 2000, praising Mohanlal's performance, Hariharan said,

"He really surprised me. That was an amazing performance. In fact, he should have won a National Award for it. Have you seen the scene in which he injects pethidine into his thighs? That was simply great. And when he realizes that the family he befriends is the family of the boy whom he had accidentally killed while ragging him in medical college, was heartbreaking. I don't know how he showed inner turmoil so beautifully. It was so subtle, so disturbing. The beauty of his performance is that he underplays emotions. Every muscle of his body reacts. For that one scene itself, he should have been given an award. I, the director, forgot myself when he was performing in Amrutham Gamaya. Why, all the unit members wept, while watching him perform". - Rediff.
