= Love Marriage (1975 film) =

- Directed by: Hariharan
- Written by: Hariharan; T. Damodaran (dialogues)
- Screenplay by: Hariharan
- Produced by: G. P. Balan
- Starring: Prem Nazir; Jayabharathi, K. P. Ummar Ranichandra and Adoor Bhasi
- Cinematography: T. N. Krishnankutty Nair
- Edited by: V. P. Krishnan
- Music by: Ahuan Sebastian
- Production company: Chanthamani Films
- Distributed by: Chanthamani Films
- Release date: 11 April 1975
- Country: India
- Language: Malayalam

Love Marriage is a 1975 Indian Malayalam film directed by Hariharan and produced by G. P. Balan. The film stars Prem Nazir, Jayabharathi, Adoor Bhasi and Jose Prakash in the lead roles. The film has musical score by Ahuan Sebastian. This is the first film of T. Damodaran master as a writer dialogues.

== Cast ==
- Prem Nazir as Madhu
- K. P. Ummer as Raju
- Adoor Bhasi as Menon
- Sankaradi as Major Nair
- Jayabharathi as Manju
- Rani Chandra as Viji
- T. S. Muthaiah as R. K. Nair
- Jose Prakash as Prakash
- Bahadoor as Gopi
- Sreelatha Namboothiri as Gopi's Fiancé
- Meena as Mini/Meenakshiyamma
- Manavalan Joseph as Doctor
- Pattom Sadan as Aryaputran
- Reena as Major's Son
- T. P. Madhavan as Police Officer
- Azhikkode Balan as Badran
- Sadhana as Kaanchi
- Sreekala (Rathidevi)
- Swapna Ravi as Stage Artist
- Treesa
- Vijaya

== Soundtrack ==
The music was composed by Ahuan Sebastian and the lyrics were written by Mankombu Gopalakrishnan.

No.	Song	Singers	Lyrics	Length (m:ss)
1	"Eeswaranmaarkkellaam"	P. Jayachandran, Ayiroor Sadasivan	Mankombu Gopalakrishnan	
2	"Kaaminimaarkkullil"	Vani Jairam, Ambili	Mankombu Gopalakrishnan	
3	"Ladies Hosteline"	P. Jayachandran	Mankombu Gopalakrishnan	
4	"Neelaambari"	K. J. Yesudas	Mankombu Gopalakrishnan	
5	"Prasadakunkumam"	A. M. Raja	Mankombu Gopalakrishnan	
6	"Vrindaavanathile Raadhe"	K. J. Yesudas, Zero Babu	Mankombu Gopalakrishnan	
