= Vepraalam =

- Directed by: Menon Suresh
- Written by: Menon Suresh; Dr. Balakrishnan (dialogues); Menon Suresh (dialogues)
- Screenplay by: Dr. Balakrishnan; Menon Suresh
- Produced by: P. K. R. Pillai
- Starring: Sukumari; Adoor Bhasi; Lakshmi; Menaka
- Cinematography: Rajarajan
- Edited by: N. P. Suresh
- Music by: K. V. Mahadevan
- Production company: Shirdi Sai Creations
- Distributed by: Shirdi Sai Creations
- Release date: 12 February 1984
- Country: India
- Language: Malayalam

Vepraalam is a 1984 Indian Malayalam film, directed by Menon Suresh and produced by P. K. R. Pillai. The film stars Sukumari, Adoor Bhasi, Lakshmi and Menaka in the lead roles. The film has musical score by K. V. Mahadevan.

== Cast ==
- P. K. R. Pillai
- Sukumari as Sumathi
- Adoor Bhasi as Godfather
- Lakshmi as Rajalakshmi
- Menaka as Beena
- Rajkumar as Babu
- Bahadoor as Paulson
- Mala Aravindan as Jolly John
- Nithya as Anu

== Soundtrack ==
The music was composed by K. V. Mahadevan and the lyrics were written by Balu Kiriyath.

No.	Song	Singers	Lyrics	Length (m:ss)
1	"Kumkumathumpikal"	P. Susheela	Balu Kiriyath	
2	"Poonkatte Vaa Vaa"	K. J. Yesudas	Balu Kiriyath	
3	"Vaarmani Thennal"	K. J. Yesudas, P. Susheela	Balu Kiriyath	
4	"Varoo Arike Arike"	S. Janaki	Balu Kiriyath	
