= Sneha Yamuna =

- Directed by: A. T. Raghu
- Written by: Dr. Balakrishnan
- Starring: Jayan; KPAC Lalitha; Lakshmi; Mohan Sharma
- Cinematography: Ramachandra Babu
- Music by: K. J. Joy
- Production company: Haseena Films Release
- Distributed by: Haseena Films Release
- Release date: 10 November 1977
- Country: India
- Language: Malayalam

Sneha Yamuna is a 1977 Indian Malayalam film, directed by A. T. Raghu. The film stars Jayan, KPAC Lalitha, Lakshmi and Mohan Sharma in the lead roles. The film has musical score by K. J. Joy.

== Cast ==
- Jayan
- KPAC Lalitha
- Lakshmi
- Mohan Sharma
- Pattom Sadan
- Sankaradi
- M. G. Soman
- Sreenivasan

== Soundtrack ==
The music was composed by K. J. Joy and the lyrics were written by Mankombu Gopalakrishnan and Yusufali Kechery.

No.	Song	Singers	Lyrics	Length (m:ss)
1	"Aayiram Chandrodayangal"	P. Susheela	Mankombu Gopalakrishnan	
2	"Naalathe Nethaakkal"	K. J. Yesudas, Chorus	Yusufali Kechery	
3	"Neela Yamune"	K. C. Varghese Kunnamkulam	Yusufali Kechery	
4	"Parippuvada Pakkavada"	K. J. Yesudas, Pattom Sadan, Saibaba	Yusufali Kechery	
