= Love Letter (1975 film) =

- Directed by: Dr. Balakrishnan
- Written by: Dr. Balakrishnan
- Screenplay by: Dr. Balakrishnan
- Produced by: Dr. Balakrishnan
- Starring: Vincent; Sudheer; Vidhubala; Reena; Jose Prakash; Manavalan Joseph; Pattom Sadan
- Cinematography: Madhu Ambat
- Edited by: G. Venkittaraman
- Music by: KJ Joy
- Production company: Rekha Cine Arts
- Distributed by: Rekha Cine Arts
- Release date: 17 January 1975
- Country: India
- Language: Malayalam

Love Letter is a 1975 Indian Malayalam film, written, directed and produced by Dr. Balakrishnan. The film stars Vincent, Sudheer, Vidhubala, Jose Prakash, Manavalan Joseph, KPAC Lalitha and Pattom Sadan in the lead roles. This was K.J. Joy's debut film as a music composer, and helped launch his illustrious career as a leading music director in Malayalam.

== Cast ==
- Vincent
- Sudheer
- Jose Prakash
- Vidhubala
- Reena
- KPAC Lalitha
- Manavalan Joseph
- Pattom Sadan
- Sankaradi
- Surasu
- T. R. Omana
- Khadeeja
- Kuthiravattam Pappu
- Cochin Haneefa
- Nilambur Balan
- Janardanan
- Kaduvakulam Antony
- Mallika Sukumaran
- Paravoor Bharathan
- T. P. Madhavan
- Unni
- Ramdas
- K. R. Suresh
- Balanujan
- C. R. Lakshmi
- Devanath
- Karunan
- Lissy
- Mangad Balakrishnan
- Marykutty
- Parvathi
- Sajeev
- Swapna
- Treesa
- Vasu

== Soundtrack ==
The music was composed by K. J. Joy and the lyrics were written by Sathyan Anthikkad and Bharanikkavu Sivakumar.

No.	Song	Singers	Lyrics	Length (m:ss)
1	"Dukhithare"	Chorus, Zero Babu	Sathyan Anthikkad	
2	"Kaamukimaare Kanyakamaare"	K. J. Yesudas	Bharanikkavu Sivakumar	
3	"Kandu Maama Kettu Maami"	Ambili, B. Vasantha, Pattom Sadan	Bharanikkavu Sivakumar	
4	"Madhuram Thirumadhuram"	K. J. Yesudas, B. Vasantha	Bharanikkavu Sivakumar	
5	"Swarnamaalakal"	Ambili	Sathyan Anthikkad	
