= Ammini Ammaavan =

- Directed by: Hariharan
- Written by: Pamman; T. Damodaran (dialogues)
- Screenplay by: Hariharan
- Produced by: P K Kaimal
- Starring: Prem Nazir; Jayabharathi; Adoor Bhasi; Thikkurissy Sukumaran Nair
- Cinematography: T. N. Krishnankutty Nair
- Edited by: M. .S Mani
- Music by: G. Devarajan
- Production company: Thirumeni Pictures
- Distributed by: Thirumeni Pictures
- Release date: 2 October 1976
- Country: India
- Language: Malayalam

Ammini Ammaavan is a 1976 Indian Malayalam-language film, directed by Hariharan and produced by George. The film stars Prem Nazir, Jayabharathi, Bahadoor, KP Ummer, Adoor Bhasi and Sankaradi. The film has musical score by G. Devarajan.

== Cast ==
- Prem Nazir as Gopi
- Jayabharathi as Ammini
- Adoor Bhasi as Bhaskarankutty
- Thikkurissy Sukumaran Nair as Shivaraman Menon
- Prema as Devaki
- Sankaradi as Ranger Paramupilla
- Sreelatha Namboothiri as Naani
- Bahadoor as Othenan
- K. P. Ummer as Parameshwaran
- Master Raghu as Sankarankutty
- Poojappura Ravi as Swami
- Reena as Hema
- Sukumari as Kunjamma
- Balan K. Nair as Balan
- Meena as Meenakshi
- Muthukulam Raghavan Pilla as Sir
- Pattom Sadan as Pattom

== Soundtrack ==
The music was composed by G. Devarajan.

No.	Song	Singers	Lyrics	Length (m:ss)
1	"Kannaampothiyilele"	K. J. Yesudas, P. Madhuri	Mankombu Gopalakrishnan	
2	"Naranayingane"	K. J. Yesudas, Chorus	Mankombu Gopalakrishnan	
3	"Penninte"	K. J. Yesudas, P. Jayachandran	Mankombu Gopalakrishnan	
4	"Raajasooyam Kazhinju"	K. J. Yesudas	Mankombu Gopalakrishnan	
5	"Thankakkanikkonna"	P. Leela, P. Madhuri, Chorus	Mankombu Gopalakrishnan	
