= Nayakan (1985 film) =

- Directed by: Balu Kiriyath
- Written by: Dr. Balakrishnan
- Screenplay by: Dr. Balakrishnan
- Starring: Mohanlal; Viji; Sankaradi; Captain Raju
- Cinematography: Ashok Chowdhary
- Edited by: G. Venkittaraman
- Music by: A. T. Ummer
- Production company: Riyas Films
- Distributed by: Riyas Films
- Release date: 12 March 1985
- Country: India
- Language: Malayalam

Nayakan is a 1985 Indian Malayalam-language film, directed by Balu Kiriyath. The film stars Mohanlal, Viji, Sankaradi and Captain Raju. The film has musical score by A. T. Ummer.

== Cast ==
- Mohanlal as Krishnadas
- Viji as Parvathi
- Sankaradi as Murari Dance Master
- Captain Raju as Rahim
- T. G. Ravi as Murugan
- Pattom Sadan
- Kunchan as Vyas/Vasu
- Jalaja as Haseena
- Vanitha Krishnachandran as Heroine
- Sathaar as Ali Abdulla
- Jose as Prem
- Shivaji as Shivaji
- James

== Soundtrack ==
The music was composed by A. T. Ummer and the lyrics were written by Balu Kiriyath.

No.	Song	Singers	Lyrics	Length (m:ss)
1	"Akaashamevide"	K. J. Yesudas, C. O. Anto, Kannur Salim	Balu Kiriyath	
2	"Enthinaanee Kalla Nanam"	Kannur Salim, Leena Padmanabhan	Balu Kiriyath	
3	"Sreedeviyaay"	K. J. Yesudas, Leena Padmanabhan	Balu Kiriyath	
4	"Suhaasam"	S. Janaki	Balu Kiriyath	

== See also ==
- Nayakan (1987 Tamil crime film)
