= Madhuram Thirumadhuram =

- Directed by: Dr. Balakrishnan
- Written by: Dr. Balakrishnan
- Screenplay by: Dr. Balakrishnan
- Produced by: Ammini Madhavan
- Starring: M. G. Soman; Vincent; Jayan; KPAC Lalitha; Sankaradi; Raghavan; Rani Chandra; Unnimary
- Cinematography: P. S. Nivas
- Music by: A. T. Ummer
- Production company: Madhusandya Films
- Distributed by: Madhusandya Films
- Release date: 7 October 1976
- Country: India
- Language: Malayalam

Madhuram Thirumadhuram is a 1976 Indian Malayalam film, directed by Dr. Balakrishnan and produced by Ammini Madhavan. The film stars KPAC Lalitha, Sankaradi, Raghavan, Rani Chandra, M. G. Soman, Vincent, Jayan and Unnimary in the lead roles. The film has musical score by A. T. Ummer.

== Plot ==
Radha falls for the playboy Rajan who treats her shamefully. Jayan plays Babu one of Rajan's spendthrift friends who encourages all his bad habits. Radha's brothers Bhaskaran and Vijayan decide to take a hand in her affairs. After Rajan loses all his money, his friends forsake him and he and his sister have to take employment at Radha's house.

== Cast ==
- M. G. Soman as Bhaskaran
- Raghavan as Vijayan
- Jayan as Babu
- Unnimary as Malini
- Vincent as Rajan
- Rani Chandra as Radha
- Kuthiravattam Pappu as Naanu
- Sadhana as Vimala
- Sankaradi as Nair
- KPAC Lalitha as Pathumma
- Pattom Sadan as Vasu
- Mala Aravindan as Vakkeel
- Cochin Haneefa as Benny
- Lalithasree as Naani
- Paravoor Bharathan as Hotelier

== Soundtrack ==
The music was composed by A. T. Ummer and the lyrics were written by Dr. Balakrishnan, Ravi Vallathol and Muppathu Ramachandran.

| No. | Song | Singers | Lyrics | Length (m:ss) |
|---|---|---|---|---|
| 1 | "Kaashaaya Kaashellam" | P. Jayachandran, KPAC Lalitha | Dr. Balakrishnan | |
| 2 | "Naduvodinjoru Mollaakka" | K. J. Yesudas, Manohari | Dr. Balakrishnan | |
| 3 | "Oh My Love My Love" | K. J. Yesudas, Pattom Sadan | Dr. Balakrishnan | |
| 4 | "Oru Nokku Devi" | P. Jayachandran | Dr. Balakrishnan | |
| 5 | "Thaazhvarayil Manju Peythu" | S. Janaki, Cochin Ibrahim | Ravi Vallathol | |
| 6 | "Vedana Vilichothi" | S. Janaki | Muppathu Ramachandran | |
