= Kalyaanappanthal =

- Directed by: Dr. Balakrishnan
- Written by: Dr. Balakrishnan
- Screenplay by: Dr. Balakrishnan
- Starring: Sudheer; Vidhubala; Vincent; Pattom Sadan; Sankaradi
- Cinematography: Kanniyappan
- Edited by: G. Venkittaraman
- Music by: A. T. Ummer
- Production company: Roopakala
- Distributed by: Roopakala
- Release date: 21 March 1975
- Country: India
- Language: Malayalam

Kalyaanappanthal is a 1975 Indian Malayalam film, directed by Dr. Balakrishnan. The film stars Sudheer, Vidhubala, Vincent, Manavalan Joseph, Pattom Sadan and Sankaradi in the lead roles. The film has musical score by A. T. Ummer.

== Cast ==
- Sudheer
- Vincent
- Vidhubala
- Rajakokila
- Sadhana
- Surasu
- KPAC Lalitha
- Manavalan Joseph
- Pattom Sadan
- Sankaradi
- Kuthiravattam Pappu
- T. R. Omana
- Paravoor Bharathan
- Cochin Haneefa
- Nilambur Balan
- T. S. Muthaiah
- Vijayan
- Khadeeja
- Kunchan
- Master Raghu
- Unni
- Unnikrishnan
- Varghese
- Bhargavan
- Japan
- Kunnamkulam Jose
- Laila
- Lissy
- M. M. Sebastian
- N. S. Mani
- Ramadas
- Swapna
- T. V. George
- Treesa
- Vijaya
- Chithra

== Soundtrack ==
The music was composed by A. T. Ummer.

No.	Song	Singers	Lyrics	Length (m:ss)
1	"Chanchala Chanchala Nayanam"	K. J. Yesudas	Yusufali Kecheri	
2	"Maanasaveenayil"	K. C. Varghese Kunnamkulam	Yusufali Kecheri	
3	"Manavaattippenninallo"	Usha Venugopal	Dr. Balakrishnan	
4	"Mayyezhuthikkaruppicha"	K. C. Varghese Kunnamkulam	Yusufali Kecheri	
5	"Oru Madhurikkum Vedanayo"	P. Susheela	Yusufali Kecheri	
6	"Swarnaabharanangalilalla"	K. J. Yesudas	Yusufali Kecheri	
