= Saranam Ayyappa =

- DVD cover
- Directed by: Dasarathan
- Produced by: Dasarathan; Tha. Kittu
- Starring: Bhoopathi; Radha Ravi; Vijayan; Jayabharathi; Suruli Rajan; Manorama
- Cinematography: S. M. Gaanam
- Edited by: R. Devarajan
- Music by: Chandrabose
- Production company: Amutheswari Films
- Release date: 28 November 1980
- Country: India
- Language: Tamil

Saranam Ayyappa is 1980 Indian Tamil-language devotional film, directed and produced by Dasarathan. The film stars Jayabharathi in the lead role. It was released on 28 November 1980.

== Cast ==
- Boopathi
- Raviraj
- Aboo Backer as Inspector
- Rajakrishna
- Jayabharathi as Saraswathi
- Vijayan as Vijay
- Radha Ravi
- M. R. Radha
- Manorama
- Suruli Rajan
- Sarath Babu
- Poornima
- Kamal Haasan (guest appearance)
- V.K.Ramasamy as Gurusamy
- Goundamani as 'Jailer' Jagadep
- Jaishankar as CID Shankar
- K. J. Yesudas Guest appearance

== Production ==
The filming was completed within three months. To seek blessings from Ayyappan to make the film successful, the director Dasarathan and his crew undertook a pilgrimage from Chennai to Sabarimala.

== Soundtrack ==
The music was composed by Chandrabose. The song "Poiyindri Meiyyodu" became hugely popular. Kamal Haasan recorded a song "Anna Vaada" for this film.

Track listing
No.	Title	Singer(s)	Length
1.	"Poiyindri Meiyodu"	K. J. Yesudas
2.	"Malai Meethu"	K. Veeramani
3.	"Sonnal Inikkuthu"	S. P. Balasubrahmanyam, Rajee
4.	"Saami Thinthakathom"	Seerkazhi Govindarajan
5.	"Anna Vaada"	Kamal Haasan

== Critical reception ==
Naagai Dharuman of Anna praised director Dasarathan for portraying Sabarimala beautifully in depth while also praising music and cinematography.
