= Viji =

Indian actress

- Born: Viji Aswath; 1966; India
- Died: 27 November 2000 (age 34); Chennai, Tamil Nadu, India
- Occupation: Actress
- Years active: 1982–2000

Viji was an Indian actress, who appeared in Tamil and Malayalam. She made her debut in Kozhi Koovuthu and acted in over 40 films.

== Biography ==
Born in 1966, Viji made her acting debut at the age of 16 in the 1982 Tamil romantic musical drama Kozhi Koovuthu. Also starring Prabhu, Suresh and Silk Smitha, the film was a huge success and ran for over 300 days in the theatres. She became a star after her first film itself, and worked with superstars Rajinikanth and Vijayakanth in Tamil cinema, and Mohanlal and Mammootty in the Malayalam cinema over the next few years.

During shooting for a song sequence in the Vijay-starrer Poove Unakkaga, Viji experienced hip and back pain and she underwent an operation on her spinal cord in 1996 at the Chennai Apollo Hospitals. The operation failed and doctors found an acute infection in the wound caused by the surgery. After more surgeries, Viji suffered temporary paralysis. She filed a lawsuit on Apollo Hospitals which returned Rs 30,000. Viji recovered after a corrective surgery and made a comeback to films in 2000 with Simmasanam. Vijayakanth, who had acted with Viji in many films, gave her an opportunity to star in the film and had promised to give her a role in his next film Vaanchinathan also, but Simmasanam ultimately remained her last film.

On 27 November 2000, Viji committed suicide in her home in Chennai. Her suicide note blamed a failed love affair with director A R Ramesh, who was already married. The Hindu reported that the prosecution case was that Ramesh promised to marry her but declined later and that three days prior to her death, Ramesh met Viji at a function and abused her. Ramesh, his wife, A R Sumathi, and his friend Chinnasamy were charged with "abetting the suicide" of Viji and prosecuted by the Mahila Court and acquitted.

== Filmography ==
Year	Film	Role	Language	Notes
1982	Kozhi Koovuthu	Kamakshi	Tamil	
1983	Saatchi		Tamil	
1983	Poikkal Kudhirai	Janaki	Tamil	
1983	Muggurammayila Mogudu		Telugu	
1983	En Priyame		Tamil	
1983	Ullam Uruguthadi		Tamil	
1983	Dhooram Adhighamillai	Meena	Tamil	
1983	Valarthakada		Tamil	
1983	Anney Anney	Rathna	Tamil	
1983	Dowry Kalyanam	Gowri	Tamil	
1984	Raja Veettu Kannukkutti	Pavithra	Tamil	
1984	Sukradhisai		Tamil	
1984	Thenkoodu		Tamil	
1984	Vetri	Shanti	Tamil	
1984	Sathyam Neeye		Tamil	
1984	Uravai Kaatha Kili		Tamil	
1984	Sahasame Jeevitham	Chaaya	Telugu	
1984	Nalla Naal	Latha	Tamil	
1984	Dhinamthorum Deepavali		Tamil	
1984	Onnum Mindatha Bharya		Malayalam	
1984	Uyarangalil	Vasanthi	Malayalam	
1985	Pudhu Yugam	Radha	Tamil	
1985	Nayakan	Parvathi	Malayalam	
1985	Kutravaaligal		Tamil	
1985	Eetti	Valli	Tamil	
1985	Kattukulle Thiruvizha		Tamil	
1985	Mookanankayiru		Tamil	
1985	Pournami Raavil 3D		Malayalam	
1986	Mr. Bharath	Ponni	Tamil	
1986	Karimedu Karuvayan		Tamil	
1986	Bhadil Solval Bhadrakali	Bhadrakali	Tamil	
1986	Marakka Mattaen		Tamil	
1986	Padikkatha Padam		Tamil	
1986	Sayam Sandhya		Malayalam	
1986	Raja Nee Vaazhga		Tamil	
1987	Dhoorathu Pachai		Tamil	
1988	Neruppu Nila		Tamil	
1988	Charavalayam		Malayalam	
1989	Eenam Thettatha Kattaru	Ponni	Malayalam	
1989	Sattathin Marupakkam	Rosy	Tamil	
1990	Aavathellam Pennale		Tamil	
1990	Avanga Namma Ooru Ponnunga		Tamil	
1992	Suriyan	Dancer	Tamil	Special appearance
1993	Rikshaw Thambi		Tamil	
1993	Uzhaippali	Dancer	Tamil	Special appearance
1993	Suriyan Chandiran		Tamil	
1993	En Idhaya Rani	Bhanu	Tamil	
1994	Atha Maga Rathiname	Vijaya	Tamil	
1994	Veetla Visheshanga		Tamil	
1996	Poove Unakkaga	Viji	Tamil	Special appearance
2000	Simmasanam	Kannamma	Tamil	
