= Srishti (film) =

- Directed by: K. T. Muhammed
- Written by: K. T. Muhammed
- Screenplay by: K. T. Muhammed
- Starring: Chowalloor Krishnankutty; Ravi Alummoodu; Vijayan; Adoor Bhavani
- Cinematography: Ramachandra Babu
- Music by: M. S. Baburaj
- Release date: 20 February 1976
- Country: India
- Language: Malayalam

Srishti is a 1976 Indian Malayalam film, directed by K. T. Muhammed. The film stars Chowalloor Krishnankutty, Ravi Alummoodu, Vijayan and Adoor Bhavani in the lead roles. The film has musical score by M. S. Baburaj.

== Cast ==
- Chowalloor Krishnankutty
- Ravi Alummoodu
- Vijayan
- Adoor Bhavani
- P. K. Vikraman Nair
- Surasu
- Thrissur Elsy

== Soundtrack ==
The music was composed by M. S. Baburaj and the lyrics were written by O. N. V. Kurup.

No.	Song	Singers	Lyrics	Length (m:ss)
1	"Aayiram Ponpanam"	L. R. Eeswari, Cochin Ibrahim	O. N. V. Kurup	
2	"Lahari Madakalahari"	L. R. Eeswari, Cochin Ibrahim	O. N. V. Kurup	
3	"Nithyakaamuki Ninne"	S. Janaki	O. N. V. Kurup	
4	"Srishtithan Soundarya"	K. J. Yesudas	O. N. V. Kurup	
