= Theru Vilakku =

- Directed by: M. A. Kaja
- Screenplay by: M. A. Kaja
- Story by: Ram–Rahim
- Produced by: K. R. S. Dhanapalan
- Starring: Vijayan; Deepa
- Cinematography: T. V. Balu
- Edited by: M. Vellaichamy
- Music by: Gangai Amaran
- Production company: Sri Devadevi Films
- Release date: 7 March 1980
- Country: India
- Language: Tamil

Theru Vilakku (transl. Street lamp) is 1980 Indian Tamil-language film directed by M. A. Kaja. The film stars Vijayan and Deepa. It was released on 7 March 1980.

== Cast ==
- Vijayan
- Deepa
- Swarna

== Soundtrack ==
The music was composed by Gangai Amaran.

No.	Title	Singer(s)	Length
1.	"Poddaya Oru Kadhudhasi"	Ilaiyaraaja, S. Janaki	3:00
2.	"Aani Aadi Aavani"	Vani Jairam, S. P. Sailaja	3:20

3. Madhura pakkam en kamalhasan, S. P. Sailaja

== Reception ==
Kanthan of Kalki, playing on the film's title which means a street lamp, said the lamp was not giving any light, but applauded Swarna's performance.
