= Simmasanam =

- Theatrical release poster
- Directed by: Eswaran
- Written by: Eswaran
- Produced by: Tamil Fathima; Thangamma Fathima
- Starring: Vijayakanth; Khushbu Sundar; Manthra; Radhika Chaudhari
- Cinematography: Rajarajan
- Edited by: G. Jayachandran
- Music by: S. A. Rajkumar
- Production company: Tamilannai Cine Creation
- Release date: 4 August 2000
- Running time: 145 minutes
- Country: India
- Language: Tamil

Simmasanam (transl. Throne) is a 2000 Indian Tamil-language action drama film directed by Eswaran in his debut. The film stars Vijayakanth in a triple role as a father and his two sons. It also stars Khushbu Sundar, Manthra, Radhika Chaudhari and Viji (in her final film before her death in November 2000). The film was released on 4 August 2000.

== Plot ==
In a remote village, Sakthivel and Thangarasu are half brothers. Sakthivel is a man of high values and integrity who has a wife and a son while Thangarasu is an angry young man who cannot tolerate injustice, thus getting easily in trouble. The half brothers are both respected by the villagers, but Sakthivel refuses to even acknowledge Thangarasu as his brother. Meanwhile, Manju and Revathi fall in love with Thangarasu. During a wedding function, some rowdies misbehave with Sakthivel's wife, Manju, and Revathi. Thangarasu beats them up. At the village court, Sakthivel insults Thangarasu and publicly flogs him. A heartbroken Thangarasu then blames his mother believing that she had killed his father and his grandfather tells him the truth.

In the past, Sathyamurthy was a village chief with a heart of gold who helped the poor. He lived with his shrewish wife Annapoorani and his son Sakthivel. Annapoorni's brothers then brainwashed her: Annapoorni didn't want her husband to help the poor any more and started to behave harshly towards him. Sathyamurthy slowly distanced himself from Annapoorni and secretly continued to help the poor. Soon, Annapoorni suspected Sathyamurthy of having an affair with the poor village woman Kannamma and Annapoorni even publicly humiliated her. Kannamma then attempted to commit suicide but Sathyamurthy saved her. Sathyamurthy's mother advised her son to marry the innocent Kannamma.

Back to the present, Thangarasu finally meets his mother Kannamma who was living all these years in a special home and he brings her to his village. There, Sakthivel insults Kannamma for killing his father Sathyamurthy. Thangarasu and Sakthivel fight but their grandmother stops it and tells them the truth. That day, Sathyamurthy had eaten poisoned food given by Annapoorni and her brothers and the blame was put on the innocent Kannamma.

Sakthivel eventually apologises to his half brother Thangarasu and his stepmother Kannamma. Annapurna scolds her brothers for killing her husband but they swear that they are innocent. Sakthivel and Thangarasu finally find out the culprit: Thambidurai, a rich zamindar who hated Sathyamurthy for helping the poor. Sakthivel and Thangarasu beat Thambidurai and his henchmen up, and the police arrest Thambidurai for the murder of their father.

== Cast ==
- Vijayakanth in a triple role as:
  - Sathyamurthy
  - Sakthivel
  - Thangarasu
- Khushbu Sundar as Sakthivel's wife
- Manthra as Manju
- Radhika Chaudhari as Revathi
- Ambika as Annapoorani, Sathyamurthy's first wife
- Viji as Kannamma, Sathyamurthy's second wife
- Radharavi as Annapoorani's brother
- Thyagu as Annapoorani's brother
- Rajan P. Dev as Thambidurai
- Manorama as Sathyamurthy's mother
- Senthil as Kandhasamy
- R. Sundarrajan as Kannamma's father
- Sethu Vinayagam as Mayilsamy
- Raviraj as Velusamy
- Naga Kannan as Rowdy
- Master Vasanthakumar as Sakthivel's son
- Vaiyapuri as Thangarasu's friend
- Anu Mohan as Bus driver
- K. R. Vatsala as Annapoorani's sister-in-law
- Fathima Babu as Annapoorani's sister-in-law
- Idichapuli Selvaraj as Accountant
- K. K. Soundar as Sakthivel and Thangarasu’s uncle
- Kovai Senthil as Villager
- Crane Manohar as Villager
- Halwa Vasu as Villager
- Chelladurai as Villager
- Jayamani as Villager
- Sharmili as Oomaichi
- Dubbing Janaki as Special home worker
- Bobby as Rowdy
- Karnaa Radha as Veeraiah
- Kalyan in a special appearance

== Production ==
The film marked the directorial debut of Eswaran. The filming was held at locations in Chennai, Ooty, Pollachi, Udumalai, and Chalakkudi, among other places. A song was picturised in the lush green valley around Tirumurthy Hills.

== Soundtrack ==
The soundtrack was composed by S. A. Rajkumar.

All lyrics are written by Vaali.

Track listing
No.	Title	Singer(s)	Length
1.	"Adi Alenkiliye Alenkiliye"	Shankar Mahadevan, Swarnalatha	4:42
2.	"Kongu Naattu Maamaa"	K. S. Chithra	4:48
3.	"Kottu Kottu Kottu Therkku Dhesai"	S. P. Balasubrahmanyam	4:53
4.	"Manja Manja Kezhangu"	Hariharan, K. S. Chithra, Swarnalatha	4:12
5.	"Paattu Onnu Pottu"	S. P. Balasubrahmanyam	5:02
Total length:			23:37

== Critical reception ==
S. R. Ashok Kumar from The Hindu noted, "The story is not new but the screenplay which has all the ingredients to sustain the interest of the average viewer, with political overtones in dialogues, has been skillfully woven by director Eswar". Indiainfo wrote, "Vijaykanth attempts to repeat the stupendous success of Vanathepol by taking on a triple role once again in Simhasanam. However, a convoluted storyline and direction make the film a bore right from the beginning". Dinakaran wrote, "The film is a kind of masala feature that caters to our interests though the film isn't that much a stunning success either" like Vaanathaippola or Vallarasu.
