= Ee Thalamura Ingane =

- Directed by: Rochy Alex
- Written by: Prathapachandran; Thalassery Raghavan (dialogues)
- Screenplay by: Thalassery Raghavan
- Produced by: Rajan
- Starring: Menaka; Prathapachandran; Sukumaran; Sibichen NJ; Kuthiravattam Pappu
- Edited by: A. Sukumaran
- Music by: G. Devarajan
- Production company: Super Productions
- Distributed by: Super Productions
- Release date: 14 October 1985
- Country: India
- Language: Malayalam

Ee Thalamura Ingane is a 1985 Indian Malayalam film, directed by Rochy Alex and produced by Rajan. The film stars Menaka, Prathapachandran, Sukumaran and Kuthiravattam Pappu in the lead roles. The film has musical score by G. Devarajan.

== Cast ==
- Menaka
- Prathapachandran
- Sukumaran
- Sibichen NJ
- Kuthiravattam Pappu
- Kollam Ajith

== Soundtrack ==
The music was composed by G. Devarajan and the lyrics were written by Poovachal Khader.

No.	Song	Singers	Lyrics	Length (m:ss)
1	"Punyapithave"	Jolly Abraham	Poovachal Khader	
2	"Puzhakale Malakale"	P. Madhuri	Poovachal Khader	
3	"Vithum Kaikottum"	K. J. Yesudas, P. Madhuri	Poovachal Khader	
