= Hariharan (director) =

Indian film director

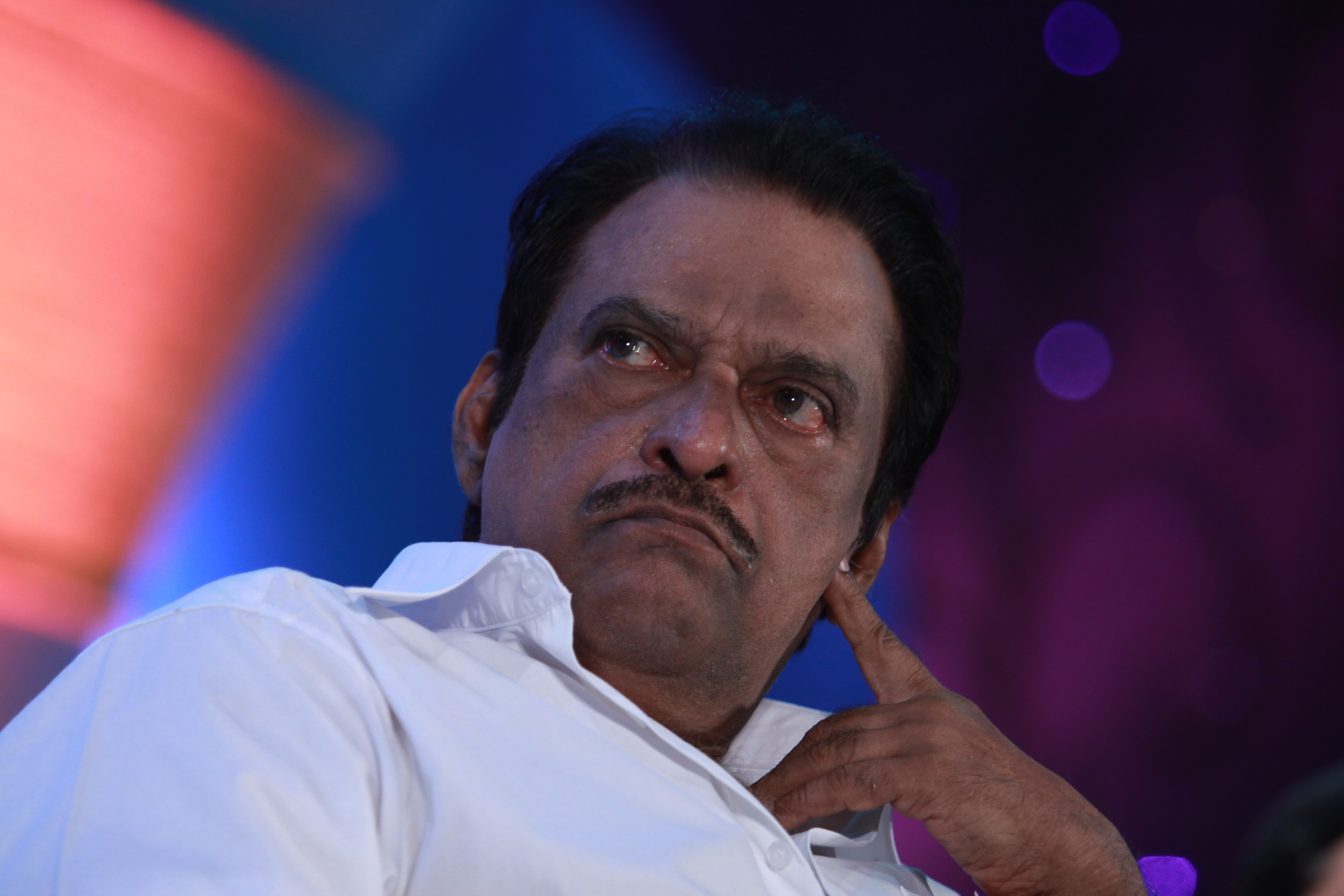
- Hariharan in 2011
- Born: Thamarassery, Kozhikode, Kerala, India
- Occupation: Director
- Years active: 1973–present
- Spouse: Bhavani
- Children: 3

Hariharan is an Indian film director who has directed over 50 Malayalam films. His movies mainly revolve around the cultural and relational aspects of a typical Keralite society. His most notable works include Sharapancharam (1979), Panchagni (1986), Idavazhiyile Poocha Mindappoocha (1979), Amrutham Gamaya (1987), Oru Vadakkan Veeragatha (1989), Sargam (1992), Parinayam (1994) and Pazhassi Raja (2009) which has won him wide critical acclaim. In 2019, he was awarded the J. C. Daniel Award, Kerala government's highest honour for contributions to Malayalam cinema.

== Biography ==
Hariharan studied at St. Thomas College, Thrissur, Universal Arts College, Kozhikode, and Raja Ravi Varma College of Fine Arts, Mavelikara .

He debuted in 1965 as an assistant director under M. Krishnan Nair. He made his directorial debut with Ladies Hostel, which was released in 1973. In the years that followed, he directed several films starring Prem Nazir and Madhu. Babumon was one of his commercially successful films among his early works.

His 1976 movie Panchami gave first major break to Jayan as an actor in Malayalam cinema. In 1979 another movie Sarapanjaram was released with Jayan and Sheela. His films such as Valarthumrugangal, Panchagni, Nakhakshathangal, Oru Vadakkan Veeragatha, Sargam, Parinayam and Ennu Swantham Janakikutty have entered the Indian Panorama of International Film Festival. He has also been honored with a Diploma by the Pyongyang Film Festival of North Korea for Oru Vadakkan Veeragatha.

In 1993, Sargam won him the Kerala State Award for Best Director and also National Film Award for Best Popular Film Providing Wholesome Entertainment. The film also received special honor at the Fukuoka and Swiss film festivals. His next film, Parinayam, won the National Film Award for Best Film on Other Social Issues and took part in about seven film festivals across the world. Ennu Swantham Janakikutty was the inaugural film at the Korean film festival (2000), and it also took part in the London film festival (2000).

Apart from these recognitions he has also won Filmfare and Ramu Kariat Awards for his works on multiple occasions. In 2009, he made Pazhassi Raja. It is based on the life of Kerala Varma Pazhassi Raja, the first revolter against the British East India Company. It was written by M. T. Vasudevan Nair. Later in 2011, he announced another historical film titled Randamoozham with Mohanlal in the lead role and written by M. T. Vasudevan Nair, which was an adaptation of his novel of the same name. It was to be produced by Gokulam Gopalan, but the project was later shelved.

== Filmography ==
Year	Title	Writer
1973	Ladies Hostel	P. Balakrishnan
1974	College Girl	P. Balakrishnan
1974	Ayalathe Sundari	Yes
1974	Rajahamsam	K. T. Muhammed
1974	Bhoomidevi Pushpiniyayi	S. L. Puram Sadanandan
1975	Madhurappathinezhu	P. Balakrishnan
1975	Love Marriage	Yes
1975	Babumon	S. L. Puram Sadanandan
1976	Panchami (film)	Yes
1976	Ammini Ammaavan	Yes
1976	Themmadi Velappan	S. L. Puram Sadanandan
1976	Rajayogam	P. Balakrishnan
1977	Ivanente Priyaputhran	S. L. Puram Sadanandan
1977	Sangamam	S. L. Puram Sadanandan
1977	Sujatha	Yes
1977	Tholkan Enikku Manassilla	S. L. Puram Sadanandan
1978	Kudumbam Namukku Sreekovil	S. L. Puram Sadanandan
1978	Adimakkachavadam	K. T. Muhammed
1978	Snehathinte Mukhangal	S. L. Puram Sadanandan
1978	Yagaswam	Yes
1979	Sarapancharam	Yes
1979	Edavazhiyile Poocha Minda Poocha	M. T. Vasudevan Nair
1980	Lava	S. L. Puram Sadanandan
1980	Muthuchippikal	Yes
1981	Poocha Sanyasi	Yes
1981	Valarthumrugangal	M. T. Vasudevan Nair
1981	Sreeman Sreemathi	Yes
1982	Anuraagakkodathi	P. Balakrishnan
1982	Anguram	Yes
1983	Evideyo Oru Shathru	Unreleased
1983	Varanmaare Aavashyamundu	Yes
1984	Poomadathe Pennu	Yes
1984	Vellam	M. T. Vasudevan Nair
1984	Vikatakavi	Yes
1986	Panchagni	M. T. Vasudevan Nair
1986	Nakhakshathangal	M. T. Vasudevan Nair
1986	Anjaam	Remake of Sharapanjaram
1987	Amrutham Gamaya	M. T. Vasudevan Nair
1987	Mangai Oru Gangai (Tamil)	Yes
1987	Njanum Neeyum	Unreleased
1988	Aranyakam	M. T. Vasudevan Nair
1989	Oru Vadakkan Veeragatha	M. T. Vasudevan Nair
1990	Oliyambukal	Dennis Joseph
1992	Sargam	Yes
1994	Parinayam	M. T. Vasudevan Nair
1998	Ennu Swantham Janakikutty	M. T. Vasudevan Nair
1999	Prem Poojari	P. Balakrishnan
2005	Mayookham	Yes
2009	Kerala Varma Pazhassi Raja	M. T. Vasudevan Nair
2013	Ezhamathe Varavu	M. T. Vasudevan Nair

== Awards ==
National Film Awards:

- 2009 - National Film Award for Best Feature Film in Malayalam - Kerala Varma Pazhassi Raja
- 1995 - National Film Award for Best Film on Other Social Issues - Parinayam
- 1993 - National Film Award for Best Popular Film Providing Wholesome Entertainment - Sargam

Kerala State Film Awards:

- 2019 - J. C. Daniel Award
- 2009 - Best Director - Pazhassi Raja
- 1994 - Best Film - Parinayam
- 1992 - Best Director - Sargam
- 1989 - Best Film with Popular Appeal and Aesthetic Value - Oru Vadakkan Veeragadha
- 1979 - Best Film with Popular Appeal and Aesthetic Value - Idavazhiyile Poocha Mindappoocha

Filmfare Awards:

- 2019 - Filmfare Award for Lifetime Achievement
- 2009 - Best Director - Pazhassi Raja
- 1994 - Best Director - Parinayam
- 1986 - Best Director - Panchagni

Other awards

- 2012 - Prem Nazir Award
- 1993 - V. Shantaram Award
