= Ladies Hostel =

- Directed by: Hariharan
- Written by: Dr. Balakrishnan
- Produced by: Dr. Balakrishnan
- Starring: Prem Nazir; Jayabharathi; Muthukulam Raghavan Pillai; Pattom Sadan
- Cinematography: T. N. Krishnankutty Nair
- Edited by: G. Venkittaraman
- Music by: M. S. Baburaj
- Production company: Rekha Cine Arts
- Distributed by: Rekha Cine Arts
- Release date: 29 June 1973
- Country: India
- Language: Malayalam

Ladies Hostel is a 1973 Indian Malayalam-language film directed by Hariharan, who debuted through this film, and produced by Dr. Balakrishnan. The film stars Prem Nazir, Jayabharathi, Muthukulam Raghavan Pillai and Pattom Sadan in the lead roles. The film has musical score by M. S. Baburaj. The film was remade in Tamil as Then Sindhudhe Vaanam (1975).

== Cast ==
- Prem Nazir as Rajan
- Jayabharathi as Lally
- Muthukulam Raghavan Pillai as Kunju
- Pattom Sadan
- Adoor Bhasi as Bharathan
- Shanthi
- T. S. Muthaiah as Raghavan
- Latheef
- Abbas
- Ambalappuzha Rajamma
- Ambili
- Bahadoor as Kuttan Pilla
- Bappukutty
- Bhaskaran
- C. L. John
- C. R. Lakshmi
- Jaya
- K. P. Ummer as Gopi
- Khadeeja
- Lissy
- Meena as Hostel Warden Kumari Malathi Amma
- Paappi
- Paravoor Bharathan as Vakkeel
- Philomina as Annamma
- Seema as Saleena
- Pushpa
- R. K. Menon
- Radhamani
- Rajkumar
- S. V. Namboodiri
- Sadhana as Reetha
- Sidhan
- Sujatha as Rama
- Vanaja
- Vincent as Ravi

== Soundtrack ==
The music was composed by M. S. Baburaj and the lyrics were written by Sreekumaran Thampi and Dr. Balakrishnan.

No.	Song	Singers	Lyrics	Length (m:ss)
1	"Chithravarnna Kodikal"	L. R. Eeswari, Chorus	Sreekumaran Thampi	
2	"Jeevitheshwari"	K. J. Yesudas	Sreekumaran Thampi	
3	"Kaattaruvi Chilankaketti"	S. Janaki	Sreekumaran Thampi	
4	"Maanasaveenayil"	K. J. Yesudas	Dr. Balakrishnan	
5	"Muthuchippi"	P. Susheela, P. Jayachandran	Sreekumaran Thampi	
6	"Priyathame"	Raveendran, K. R. Venu	Sreekumaran Thampi	
