= Bharya Oru Manthri =

1986 film directed by Raju Mahendra

- Directed by: Raju Mahendra
- Starring: Menaka; Sukumaran; Anuradha; Balan K. Nair
- Music by: Kannur Rajan
- Production company: Vinayaka Arts
- Distributed by: Vinayaka Arts
- Release date: 29 June 1986
- Country: India
- Language: Malayalam

Bharya Oru Manthri is a 1986 Indian Malayalam film, directed by Raju Mahendra. The film stars Menaka, Sukumaran, Anuradha and Balan K. Nair in the lead roles. The film has musical score by Kannur Rajan.

== Cast ==
- Menaka as Jayadevi
- Sukumaran as Krishnakumar
- Anuradha as Radha
- Balan K. Nair as India King Balakrishnan
- Prathapachandran as Janardhanan
- Vijayalakshmi as Jayadevi's mother
- Jalan as Vijayabhasker
- Jagathy Sreekumar as Blade
- Radhadevi as Rani
- Baby Shalini as Ktishnakumar's daughter
- Pattom Sadan as Kudamaloor
- Thodupuzha Radhakrishnan as Swami

== Soundtrack ==
The music was composed by Kannur Rajan and the lyrics were written by Bichu Thirumala.

No.	Song	Singers	Lyrics	Length (m:ss)
1	"Karalinteyullil"	P. Jayachandran, Chorus	Bichu Thirumala	
2	"Sukhamulla Kulirthennal"	K. J. Yesudas	Bichu Thirumala	
3	"Vaathsyayanante Raathrikal"	S. Janaki	Bichu Thirumala	
4	"Veene Ninne Meettaan"	K. J. Yesudas, Vani Jairam	Bichu Thirumala	
