= Onnum Mindatha Bharya =

- Directed by: Balu Kiriyath
- Written by: Balu Kiriyath
- Screenplay by: Balu Kiriyath
- Produced by: Thiruppathi Chettiyar
- Starring: Mammootty; Jalaja; Viji; Menaka
- Cinematography: Ashok Chowdhary
- Edited by: K. Sankunni
- Music by: Raghu Kumar
- Production company: Evershine Films
- Distributed by: Evershine Films
- Release date: 12 April 1984
- Country: India
- Language: Malayalam

Onnum Mindatha Bharya is a 1984 Indian Malayalam-language film, directed by Balu Kiriyath and produced by Thiruppathi Chettiyar. The film stars Mammootty, Jalaja, Viji and Menaka. The film's musical score is by Raghu Kumar.

== Cast ==
- Mammootty
- Jalaja
- Viji
- Menaka
- Prathapachandran
- Sukumaran
- Baby Geethu Antony
- Baby Shalini
- Balan K. Nair
- Kunchan
- Kuthiravattam Pappu
- Nithya

== Soundtrack ==
The music was composed by Raghu Kumar with lyrics by Balu Kiriyath.

No.	Song	Singers	Lyrics	Length (m:ss)
1	"Daddy How Are You Today"	K. J. Yesudas, Baby Geethu Antony	Balu Kiriyath	
2	"Manassum Shareeravum"	K. J. Yesudas	Balu Kiriyath	
3	"Ruhiyante"	S. Janaki, Jolly Abraham, Satheesh Babu	Balu Kiriyath	
4	"Vasantham Vannu"	K. J. Yesudas, S. Janaki	Balu Kiriyath	
