= Nalla Naal =

- Theatrical release poster
- Directed by: R. Thyagarajan
- Screenplay by: Viji
- Produced by: C. Dhandayuthapani
- Starring: Vijayakanth; Thiagarajan; Nalini; Viji
- Edited by: MG Balu Rao
- Music by: Ilaiyaraaja
- Production company: Thevar Films
- Release date: 1 June 1984
- Running time: 125 minutes
- Country: India
- Language: Tamil

Nalla Naal (transl. Good day) is a 1984 Indian Tamil-language masala film directed by R. Thyagarajan and produced by Thevar Films. The film stars Vijayakanth, Thiagarajan, Nalini and Viji. It was released on 1 June 1984.

== Plot ==
The film tells in a flashback that the father of Chinna Durai is assassinated by the father of Kaali. Chinna Durai takes revenge, kills him and goes to prison leaving his mother and sister to see him leave.

Furious, Kaali promises to kill Chinna Durai on her way out. However, Kaali meets Chinna Durai's sister, Shenbagam. She wraps her heart to marry him knowing the story, that he is looking for Chinna Durai, who is his brother protecting him from murder.

Under the name of Muthu, he gets out of prison and goes to the village to meet his sister. In shock, Muthu did not know she was married to Kaali. Muthu and Kaali become friends under the pretext of another name. Knowing the release date of Chinna Durai, Kaali does not find him in jail. He has a doubt and tries to find him. The ending tells how Chinna Durai and Kaali will associate.

== Cast ==
- Vijayakanth as Chinna Durai (Muthu)
- Thiagarajan as Kaali
- Nalini as Shenbagam
- Viji as Latha
- Captain Raju as Pannaiyar
- Thengai Srinivasan as Bhai
- Jai Ganesh as Kathamuthu
- V. Gopalakrishnan as Chinna Durai's father
- Senthil
- Idichapuli Selvaraj
- Jayamalini
- Kullamani
- K. Natraj

== Production ==
The filming was held at Pollachi and Mudumalai forest. A fight sequence featuring Vijayakanth fighting with tiger was shot at Mudumalai forest. The song "Venam Venam Oorellam" was shot at Hogenakkal.

== Soundtrack ==
The music was composed by Ilaiyaraaja, with lyrics by Vaali.

Song	Singer(s)	Length
"Othayilae Pen Kuthirai"	Malaysia Vasudevan, S. Janaki	04:29
"Podu Thanthanathom"	S. P. Balasubrahmanyam, S. Janaki	04:26
"Venam Venam Orellam"	S. P. Sailaja	04:19
"Vettaveli Pottalile Nattanadu"	S. Janaki	04:30
"Yamma Yamma Nee Vazhanum"	Malaysia Vasudevan, Chorus	04:24

== Critical reception ==
Jayamanmadhan of Kalki wrote that the film had listenable three songs, an enjoyable item number, slightly funny humour, watchable two fights and use of horses, questioning if that was enough. Anna wrote that until the final scene, it is impossible to imagine that the end of the film will be like this, Thyagarajan directs the film without sagging.
