= Thathamme Poocha Poocha =

- Directed by: Balu Kiriyath
- Written by: Dr. Balakrishnan
- Screenplay by: Dr. Balakrishnan
- Produced by: P. K. R. Pillai
- Starring: Rajkumar; Suhasini; Lalu Alex; Unnimary
- Cinematography: Ashok Chowdhary
- Edited by: N. P. Suresh
- Music by: M. B. Sreenivasan
- Production company: Shirdi Sai Creations
- Distributed by: Shirdi Sai Creations
- Release date: 9 June 1984
- Country: India
- Language: Malayalam

Thathamme Poocha Poocha (transl. O Parrot, there is a cat, a cat!) is a 1984 Indian Malayalam film, directed by Balu Kiriyath and produced by P. K. R. Pillai. The film stars Rajkumar, Suhasini, Lalu Alex and Unnimary in the lead roles. The film has musical score by M. B. Sreenivasan.

== Cast ==
- Rajkumar as Venugopal Menon
- Suhasini as Kalyani
- Lalu Alex as Chanthu
- Unnimary as Shyama
- Adoor Bhasi as Gonzalvous
- Kuthiravattam Pappu as Ananthan
- Kunchan as Kochappan
- Mala Aravindan as Balaraman
- Sukumari as Sumathy
- Kundara Johnny
- Jayamalini as Cabaret Dancer
- Maniyanpilla Raju
- K. P. R. Pillai
- Lalithasree
- P. K. Abraham

== Soundtrack ==
The music was composed by M. B. Sreenivasan.

No.	Song	Singers	Lyrics	Length (m:ss)
1	"Ente Manassinte"	K. J. Yesudas	Balu Kiriyath	
2	"Enthino Kochu Thennalaay"	K. J. Yesudas	Balu Kiriyath	
3	"Thathamme Poocha Poocha"	S. Janaki, Kalyani Menon	Balu Kiriyath	
4	"Vinoda Kusumam"	K. J. Yesudas	Balu Kiriyath	
