= Enganeyundashaane =

- Promotional Poster
- Directed by: Balu Kiriyath
- Written by: K. Viswanathan; Balu Kiriyath (dialogues)
- Screenplay by: Balu Kiriyath
- Produced by: Renji Mathew
- Starring: Mammootty; Thilakan; Menaka; C. I. Paul
- Cinematography: Ashok Chowdhary
- Edited by: V. P. Krishnan
- Music by: Raveendran
- Production company: Centenary Productions
- Distributed by: Centenary Productions
- Release date: 7 December 1984
- Country: India
- Language: Malayalam

Enganeyundashaane is a 1984 Indian Malayalam-language film, directed by Balu Kiriyath and produced by Renji Mathew. The film stars Mammootty, Thilakan, Menaka and C. I. Paul . The film has musical score by Raveendran.

== Cast ==
- Mammootty as Gopikuttan Pilla
- Thilakan as Viswanathan Nair
- Menaka as Sunantha Viswanathan
- C. I. Paul as Viswanathan Menon
- Kundara Johnny as Suresh
- Kunchan
- Thodupuzha Vasanthi as Radhika
- Subha as Prabha Viswanathan
- Kannor Sreelatha as Alice Thomasukutty
- Maniyanpilla Raju as Sundarapandiyan/Thomasukutty

== Soundtrack ==
The music was composed by Raveendran and the lyrics were written by Balu Kiriyath.

| No. | Song | Singers | Lyrics | Length (m:ss) |
|---|---|---|---|---|
| 1 | "Chakravarthi" | K. J. Yesudas, Raveendran | Balu Kiriyath | |
| 2 | "Pinangunnuvo" | S. Janaki | Balu Kiriyath | |
| 3 | "Pinangunnuvo" | P. Jayachandran | Balu Kiriyath | |
| 4 | "Sopana Gaayikaye" | K. J. Yesudas, S. Janaki, Raveendran | Balu Kiriyath | |
