= Menaka (actress) =

Indian actress

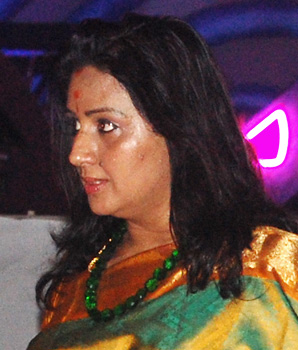
- Born: Padmavathi Iyengar; Nagercoil, Kanyakumari, India
- Occupations: Actress; Film producer
- Years active: 1980–1987; 2005–present
- Spouse: G. Suresh Kumar (m. 1987)
- Children: 2 (incl. Keerthy Suresh)

Menaka Suresh, (born Padmavathi Iyengar) known mononymously as Menaka, is an Indian actress and film producer. She made her debut in the 1980 Tamil film Ramayi Vayasukku Vanthutta. In an acting career spanning from 1980 to 1987, Menaka appeared in over 125 films as a heroine, mostly in Malayalam. She also appeared in few Tamil, Telugu, Kannada and Hindi films. She married Malayalam film producer G. Suresh Kumar. After 19 years, she made a comeback through the television serial Kaliveedu. At 8th SIIMA, she received SIIMA Lifetime Achievement Award.

== Early life ==
Menaka, whose real name is Padmavathy Iyengar, was born into a Tamil Iyengar Brahmin family in Nagercoil, Kanyakumari district, Travancore, India. She was the only daughter among the four children of Rajagopal and Saroja. Both her parents were school teachers. Her mother Saroja taught at the Lourdes Girls' Higher Secondary School in Perambur, Madras.

== Career ==
Menaka had become one of the highest-paid actresses in South Indian cinema when she decided to retire from acting post-marriage. After 24 years, she made a comeback as a film actress in 2011 with Fazil-directed Living Together, in a character role.

== Personal life ==
Menaka married film producer G. Suresh Kumar at Guruvayur Temple on 27 October 1987. They have two daughters — Revathy and Keerthy Suresh. Initially they settled in Chennai and later moved to Thiruvananthapuram. Keerthy is a film actress and Revathy is an assistant director.

== Filmography ==
=== As an actress ===
==== Malayalam ====
Year	Title	Role	Notes
1981	Oppol	Malu	
1981	Veliyettam	Jaanu	
1981	Visham	Shobha	
1981	Guha	Suvarna	
1981	Munnettam	Indu	
1981	Ahimsa	Safiya	
1981	Kolangal	Kunjamma	
1981	Veshangal		
1982	Adarsham	Malathy	
1982	Aayudham	Usha	
1982	Rakthasakshi	Geetha	
1982	Kaalam	Jaya	
1982	Kanmanikkorumma (Ushnabhoomi)	Usha	
1982	Drohi		
1982	Ente Mohangal Poovaninju	Sridevi	
1982	Ponnum Poovum	Subhadra	
1983	Arunayude Prabhatham		
1983	Oru Mottu Virinjappol		
1983	Kathi		
1983	Kolakomban	Dr.Leela	
1983	Rugma	Elizabeth	
1983	Eettillam	Abitha	
1983	Shesham Kazhchayil	Lathika	
1983	Nadi Muthal Nadi Vare	Thulasi	
1983	Astapahi	Radha	
1983	Arabikadal		
1983	Thavalam	Ramani	
1983	Thalam Thettiya Tharattu	Sindhu	
1983	Justice Raja	Thulasi	
1983	Pourusham	Janu	
1983	Engane Nee Marakkum	Sobha	
1983	Rathilayam	Makutty	
1983	Prem Nazirine Kanmanilla	Herself	
1984	Thirakal	Rekha	
1984	Adiyozhukkukal	Madhavi	
1984	Koottinilamkili	Radhika	
1984	Vellam	Ambika	
1984	Karimbu	Princy	
1984	Odaruthammava Aalariyam	Shobha Govind	
1984	Aayiram Abhilashangal		
1984	Vepralam	Beena	
1984	Paavam Poornima	Poornima	
1984	Krishna Guruvayoorappa	Unni's wife	
1984	Aagraham		
1984	Onnum Mindatha Bharya	Asha Thampi	
1984	Velichamillatha Veedhi	Lekha	
1984	Veendum Chalikkunna Chakram	Prameela	
1984	Oru Thettinte Katha		
1984	Sooryane Mohicha Penkutty		
1984	Amme Narayana		
1984	Ethirppukal	Lakshmi	
1984	Thirakil Alppam Samayam	Saphiya	
1984	Swanthamevide Bandhamevide	Indulekha	
1984	Appunni	Ammu	
1984	Poochakkoru Mookkuthi	Revathi	
1984	Piriyilla Naam	Sherly	
1984	Manase Ninakku Mangalam	Sobha	
1984	Mainakam	Jaya	
1984	Engane Undasane	Sunanda	
1984	Muthodumuthu	Achimol (Aswathy)	
1985	Kandu Kandarinju	Ammini	
1985	Oro Poovilum		
1985	Ozhivukalam		
1985	Ee Thalamura Ingane		
1985	Ambada Njaane!	Devayani	
1985	Principal Olivil	Malathi	
1985	Soundarya Pinakkam	Malini	
1985	Anakkorumma	Devi	
1985	Edanilangal	Bhanu	
1985	Archana Aaradhana	Aradhana	
1985	Oru Nokku Kanan	Sandhya	
1985	Sammelanam	Shalini	
1985	Ormikkan Omanikkan		
1985	Mukhyamantri	Anu	
1985	Vellam	Ambika	
1985	Mounanombaram	Indu	
1985	Parayanumvayya Parayathirikkanumvayya	Shalini	
1985	Boeing Boeing	Sreekutty	
1985	Akkare Ninnoru Maran	Nandini	
1986	Kulambadikal	Susan	
1986	Hello My Dear Wrong Number	Shobha	
1986	Bhagavaan		
1986	Malarum Kiliyum	Maya	
1986	Bharya Oru Manthri	Jayadevi	
1986	Oppam Oppathinoppam	Rajamma	
1986	Viswasichalum Illenkilum		
1986	Aalorungi Arangorungi	Marykutty	
1986	Yuvajanotsavam	Nirmala	
1986	Revathikkoru Pavakkutty	Indu	
1986	Ponnum Kudthinu Pottu	Sethubhai	
1986	Naale Njangalude Vivahum	Indu	
1986	Ayalvasi Oru Daridravasi	Kaveri	
1986	Snehamulla Simham	Vilasini	
1986	Doore Doore Oru Koodu Koottam	Sujatha	
1986	Varshangal Poyathariyathe	Lakshmi	
1987	Poovittu Poovittu (Thammil Kandappol)		
1987	Kottum Kuravayum	Vimala	
1987	Amme Bhagavathi	Parvathy	
1987	Onnaam Maanam Poomaanam	Rema	
1987	Neeyethra Dhanya	Shobha	
1987	Kilippattu		
1987	Kottum Kuravayum		
1994	Chanakya Soothrangal	Leela	
2011	Living Together	Valsala	
2012	Vaadhyar	Subhadra	
2012	Orkut Oru Ormakoot	Veni	
2013	Pakaram	Parvathi	
2013	Kutteem Kolum	Subadra	
2013	Abhiyum Njanum	Devika	
2015	Njan Samvidhanam Cheyyum	Shobha	
2017	Ima	Raadhu	Short film
2021	8½ Intercuts: Life and Films of K.G. George	Herself	Documentary
2021	Bhramam	Uday's yesteryear co-star	

==== Tamil ====
Year	Title	Role	Notes
1980	Ramayi Vayasukku Vanthutta	Ramayi	Debut movie
1980	Savithri	Savithri	
1980	Oli Pirandhathu	Kalyani	
1981	Keezh Vaanam Sivakkum	Gayathri	
1981	Kaalam	Jaya	
1981	Netrikkan	Menaka	
1982	Om Shakti	Kanniamma / Amman	
1982	Thooku Medai	Bhavani	
1982	Nijangal	Menaka	
1982	Iniyavale Vaa	Shakunthala	
1982	Nirantharam	Rani	
1982	Nalanthana	Raji	
1982	Panchavarnam		
1983	Neethibathi	Geetha	
1983	Urangatha Ninaivugal	Uma	
1985	Maappillai Singam	Gouri	
1985	Engirunthalum Vazhga		
1985	Kadivalam	Revathi	
1986	Unakkaagave Vaazhgiren	Shakunthala	
2012	Mattuthavani		

==== Telugu ====
Year	Title	Role	Notes
1980	Punnami Naagu	Poornima	
1982	Subbarao Ki Kopam Vacchindhi		
1988	Indradhanussu		

==== Kannada ====
Year	Title	Role	Notes
1984	Samayada Gombe	Lakshmi	

=== As producer ===
Year	Title	Director	Notes
1991	Vishnulokam	Kamal	
1992	Australia	Rajiv Anchal	Unreleased film
1993	Butterflies	Rajiv Anchal	
1994	Kashmeeram	Rajiv Anchal	
1995	Thakshashila	Sreekuttan	
1997	Aaram Thamburan	Shaji Kailas	
2000	Cover Story	G. S. Vijayan	
2000	Pilots	Rajiv Anchal	
2001	Achaneyanenikkishtam	Suresh Krishna	
2002	Kuberan	Sundar Das	
2002	Shivam	Shaji Kailas	
2009	Seetha Kalyanam	T. K. Rajeev Kumar	
2022	Vaashi	Vishnu G. Raghav	

== Television ==
- All shows are in Malayalam unless noted otherwise

=== Serials ===
Year	Title	Role	Channel	Notes	Ref.
1993	Scooter		DD Malayalam		
2005	Kaliveedu		Surya TV		
2006	Ammathottil		Surya TV		
2007	Chitrasalabham		Amrita TV		
2007-2008	Ammakkayi		Surya TV		
2009	Monoottante Onam		Surya TV	Telefilm	
2013	Rajakumari	Durga Sivalingam	Sun TV	Tamil serial	
2016	Sundari	Sethu Lakshmi	Mazhavil Manorama		

=== TV shows ===
Year	Title	Channel	Role	Notes
	Samagamam	Amrita TV	Herself	
2010	Thillana Thillana	Surya TV	Judge	
2011	Vivel Big break	Surya TV	Judge	
2011	Hairomax Mrs.Kerala	Asianet	Judge	
2012	Lunars Comedy Express	Asianet Plus	Judge	
2013	Veruthe Alla Bharya 2	Mazhavil Manorama	Judge	
2013	Travel to Kanchipuram	Manorama News	Host	
2013	Varthaprabhatham	Asianet News	Herself	
2013	Jeevitham Ithuvare	Jaihind TV	Herself	
2013	Manassiloru Mazhavillu	Kairali TV	Herself	
2014	JB Junction	Kairali TV	Herself	
2017	Komady Circus	Mazhavil Manorama	Jury	
2017	Onnum Onnum Moonu	Mazhavil Manorama	Herself	
2018-2020	Comedy stars season 2	Asianet	Judge	
2018	Comedy stars Plus	Asianet Plus	Judge	
2021	Red Carpet	Amrita TV	Mentor	
2022	MY G Flowers Oru Kodi	Flowers TV	Participant	
