= Kozhi Koovuthu (1982 film) =

- Poster
- Directed by: Gangai Amaran
- Written by: Gangai Amaran
- Produced by: R. D. Bhaskar
- Starring: Prabhu; Suresh; Smitha; Viji
- Cinematography: P. S. Nivas
- Edited by: B. Lenin; V. T. Vijayan
- Music by: Ilaiyaraaja
- Production company: Pavalar Creations
- Release date: 25 December 1982
- Country: India
- Language: Tamil

Kozhi Koovuthu (Tamil pronunciation: [koːɭi] transl. The chicken is clucking) is a 1982 Indian Tamil-language romantic musical film written and directed by Gangai Amaran in his debut. The film stars Prabhu, Suresh, Smitha and Viji in her acting debut. The film has music by Ilaiyaraaja, cinematography by P. S. Nivas, editing by B. Lenin, and was released on 25 December 1982. The film was remade in Telugu as Veerabhadrudu (1984).

== Plot ==
Velusamy is a macho and everybody in the village fears him because of his rude and offensive talks, but Velusamy is good at heart and helpful to the needy. Ramakrishna, an orphan, is appointed as the postman in this rural community of Anaikaraipatti. Kamakshi, the daughter of Velusamy's elder sister Vellathaayi, initially misunderstands Ramakrishna and has tiffs with him. Vellathaayi insists on Velusamy to have his livelihood as she wishes arrange her daughter's marriage with him, but villagers oppose the same and insult Velusamy. Notwithstanding the insult, Velusamy promises to prove himself and the villagers of his worth, and joins the military. The rest of the story forms what happens to the relationship between them.

== Cast ==
- Prabhu as Velusamy
- Suresh as Ramakrishnan
- Smitha as Chittu
- Viji as Kamakshi
- Bindu Ghosh
- Karikol Raju
- Kumarimuthu
- Parthiban
- Vellai Subbaiah

== Production ==
Kozhi Koovuthu is the directorial debut of Gangai Amaran. The title was suggested by his brother Ilaiyaraaja, who suggested Amaran to take up direction as a career. It is also the acting debut of Viji. Editing was jointly handled by B. Lenin and V. T. Vijayan, although the song "Edho Moham Edho Dhagam" was edited exclusively by Vijayan using already shot montages as Lenin was unavailable.

== Soundtrack ==
The music was composed by Ilaiyaraaja. The song "Edho Moham Edho Dhagam" is set in the Carnatic raga known as Nayaki, and "Poove Ilaiya Poove" is set to Sankarabharanam. "Annae Annae" is the only filmi song sung by Samuel Grubb.

Track listing
No.	Title	Lyrics	Singer(s)	Length
1.	"Engum Niraindholirum"	P. Sivagama Sundari	Krishnachandran
2.	"Orumaiyudan"		Krishnachandran
3.	"Veeraiyya Veeraiyya"	Panchu Arunachalam	S. P. Sailaja
4.	"Potta Pilla"	Vaali	Malaysia Vasudevan, S. P. Sailaja
5.	"Aayarpadi Kannanane"	Gangai Amaran	S. Janaki
6.	"Annae Annae"	Vaali	Samuel Grubb, Deepan Chakravarthy, G. Vidhyadar
7.	"Poove Ilaiya Poove"	Vairamuthu	Malaysia Vasudevan, Chorus
8.	"Edho Moham Edho Dhagam"	Vairamuthu	S. Janaki, Krishnachandran
9.	"Onnam Vetha"	Vairamuthu	Sudhakar, Chorus

== Critical reception ==
Thiraignani of Kalki criticised Viji's performance and the film's resemblance to Alaigal Oivathillai (1981) in many parts, but appreciated the music. Balumani of Anna reviewed the film more positively, praising the acting of the cast, the music and cinematography. The film ran for over 300 days in theatres.

== Bibliography ==
- Sundararaman (2007) [2005]. Raga Chintamani: A Guide to Carnatic Ragas Through Tamil Film Music (2nd ed.). Pichhamal Chintamani. OCLC 295034757.
