= Chottanikkara Temple =

Bhagavathi temple in Ernakulam District, Kerala, India

Chottanikkara Bhagavathy Temple
- ചോറ്റാനിക്കര ഭഗവതി ക്ഷേത്രം
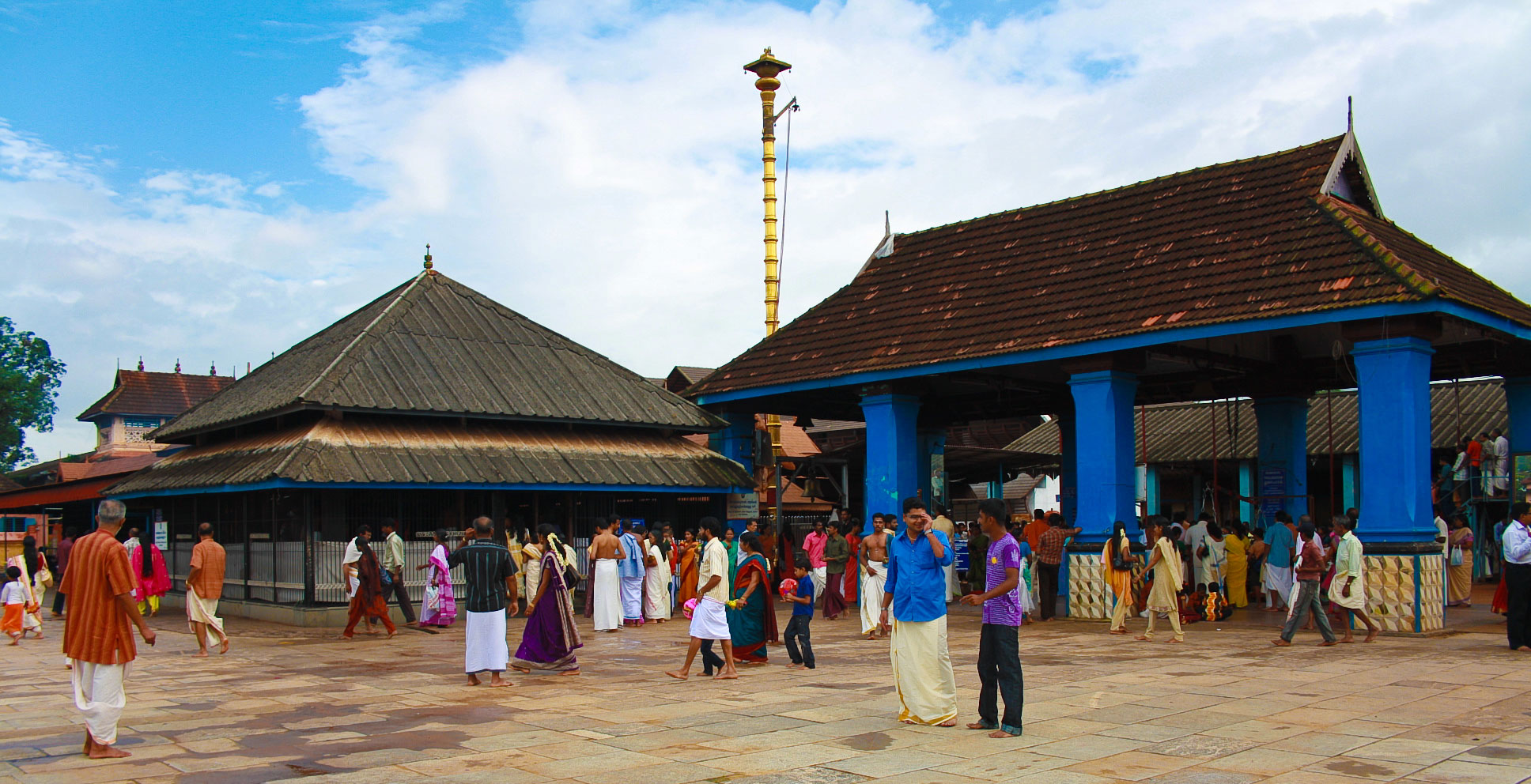
- Chottanikkara Temple

- Bhagavathy Temple, Chottanikkara, Ernakulam, Kerala

Religion
- Affiliation: Hinduism
- District: Ernakulam
- Deity: Chottanikkara Bhagavathy (Lakshmi) with Narayana
- Festivals: Makam Thozhal, Navarathri, Thrikkarthika, Deepavali

Location
- Location: Chottanikkara
- State: Kerala
- Country: India
- Coordinates: 9°55′59.4″N 76°23′29.1″E

Architecture
- Type: Traditional kerala architecture

Specifications
- Temple: Two
- Elevation: 52.47 m (172 ft)

Website
- chottanikkarabhagavathy.org

The Chottanikkara Bhagavathy Temple is a Hindu temple dedicated to Goddess Bhagavathy, located in the village of Chottanikkara within the Ernakulam District of Kerala, India. Managed by the Cochin Devaswom Board, it is one of the most significant shrines among the 409 temples under the board's administration.

The temple's central deity is the Divine Mother, worshipped as Rajarajeswari (Adiparashakthi) in three distinct forms throughout the day: Saraswathi in the morning, Lakshmi at noon, and Kali in the evening. An idol of Mahavishnu shares the same pedestal, leading to the collective nomenclature of Lakshmi Narayana, Ammenarayana, Devinarayana, and Bhadrenarayana. The same pedestal also houses idols of Brahma, Shiva, Ganapathi, Subramanya, and Sastha. Structurally, the deity is a Svayambhū (lit. 'self-manifested') laterite formation known as the Rudrākṣa Śilā.

== Legend ==
The area in which the temple is situated was once a dense jungle. A tribesman named Kannappan used to live in this forest. He was a devout worshipper of the goddess Mahakali, and would ritually sacrifice a buffalo to her every Friday (the day of the Goddess). One day, he found a calf near the forest. He kidnapped the calf and took her to his stone altar. Just before he is about to sacrifice the calf, his daughter Pavizham stepped in and pleaded to him to stop the sacrifice. The man loved his daughter and thus let her keep the calf as a pet. Unfortunately, Pavizham died some days later, possibly due to a snake bite. Kannappan broke into tears and decided to cremate her body. To his surprise, his daughter's corpse disappeared. A nearby priest told him the reason for such an occurrence; Kannappan used to forcibly take young calves from their mothers and sacrificed them. As punishment, he met the same fate when his daughter died. When the tribesman looked for the calf, he found the sacrifice altar shining in its place. The priest explained that the calf represented the divine couple, Lord Vishnu and Lakshmi. He asked Kannapan to pray before the alter everyday to undo his sins.

== Film adaptation ==
- Chottanikkara Amma
- Amme Narayana
- Amme Bhagavathi

== See also ==
- Temples of Kerala
