= Thakilu Kottampuram =

- Pre-release poster
- Directed by: Balu Kiriyath
- Screenplay by: Balu Kiriyath
- Story by: S. Thankappan
- Produced by: S. Thankappan
- Starring: Prem Nazir; Sheela; Mohanlal; Jagathy Sreekumar
- Cinematography: Ashok Chowdhary
- Edited by: N. P. Suresh
- Music by: Darsan Raman; P. Susheeladevi; Guna Singh (Score)
- Production company: JK Productions
- Distributed by: Munawar Release
- Release date: 12 June 1981
- Country: India
- Language: Malayalam

Thakilu Kottampuram is a 1981 Indian Malayalam-language film written and directed by Balu Kiriyath (in his directorial debut). based on the story Venalil Vidarunna Pookkal by S. Thankappan, who also produced the film. It stars Prem Nazir, Sheela, Mohanlal and Jagathy Sreekumar in substantial roles. The film features songs composed by Darsan Raman and P. Susheeladevi, while the background score was provided by Guna Singh.

== Cast ==
- Prem Nazir as Rajakrishna Kurup
- Sheela as Mridula
- Mohanlal as Paul
- Jagathy Sreekumar as Shishupalan
- Adoor Bhasi as Kunjunni Kurup
- Sukumaran as Unnikrsihna Kurup
- Anjali Naidu as Uma
- Baby Manjusha as Sreemol
- Jalaja as Padmaja
- Mala Aravindan as Vasu
- Gusth Sreekumar
- Jayaprakash
- Santhakumari as Mridula's mother
- Sathyachithra
- Praveena as Urmila
- Sreekala (Rathidevi) as Theresiakutty
- Daisy

== Soundtrack ==
The music was composed by Darsan Raman and P Susheeladevi and lyrics was written by Balu Kiriyath.

No.	Song	Singers	Lyrics	Length (m:ss)
1	Da da da daddy	K. J. Yesudas, Baby Kala, KS Beena	Balu Kiriyath	
2	Ekaanthathayude	P Susheela	Balu Kiriyath	
3	Erinjadangumen [Bit]		Balu Kiriyath	
4	Kannippoompaithal	K. J. Yesudas, KS Beena	Balu Kiriyath	
5	Swapnangale Veenurangu	K. J. Yesudas	Balu Kiriyath	
