= Paavam Poornima =

- Directed by: Balu Kiriyath
- Screenplay by: Balu Kiriyath
- Story by: Tharasu
- Produced by: Erali
- Starring: Mohanlal; Menaka; Mammootty; Bhagyasri; Sukumari
- Cinematography: Ashok Chowdhary
- Edited by: K. Sankunni
- Music by: Raghu Kumar; Johnson (score)
- Production company: Beegees Films
- Distributed by: Beegees Films
- Release date: 25 May 1984
- Country: India
- Language: Malayalam

Paavam Poornima (transl. Poor Poornima) is a 1984 Indian Malayalam-language drama film written and directed by Balu Kiriyath and produced by Erali. The film stars Mohanlal, Menaka, Mammootty and Sukumari. The film has songs composed by Raghu Kumar and background score by Johnson.

Poornima is a popular woman who has many suitors. However, when she is found dead in a place she had visited the night before, Jayaraj, her admirer, gets arrested for the crime.

== Cast ==
- Menaka as Poornima
- Mammootty as Jayaraj
- Mohanlal as Annan Thirumeni
- Bhagyasri
- Sukumari
- Innocent
- Adoor Bhasi
- Sankaradi
- Chithra
- Kothuku Nanappan
- Kunchan

== Soundtrack ==
The music was composed by Raghu Kumar with lyrics by Balu Kiriyath.

No.	Song	Singers	Lyrics	Length (m:ss)
1	"Nammude Ee College"	Sujatha Mohan, Chorus, Krishnachandran	Balu Kiriyath	
2	"Porunne"	Chorus, Leena Padmanabhan	Balu Kiriyath	
3	"Pularvanapponthoppil"	S. Janaki	Balu Kiriyath	
