= Ezhu Muthal Onpathu Vare =

1985 film by J. Sasikumar

- Poster
- Directed by: J. Sasikumar
- Produced by: P. K. R. Pillai
- Starring: Mohanlal; Bhagyalakshmi; Ratheesh; Captain Raju; Anuradha
- Cinematography: J. Williams
- Edited by: K. Sankunni
- Music by: K. J. Joy
- Production company: Shirdi Sai Creations
- Distributed by: Shirdi Sai Release
- Release date: 26 July 1985
- Country: India
- Language: Malayalam

Ezhu Muthal Onpathu Vare (transl. From seven to nine) is a 1985 Indian Malayalam-language film directed by J. Sasikumar and produced by P. K. R. Pillai. The film stars Mohanlal, Ratheesh, Captain Raju, and Anuradha. The film features musical score by K. J. Joy.

== Cast ==
- Mohanlal
- Ratheesh
- M. G. Soman
- K. P. Ummer
- Captain Raju
- T. G. Ravi
- Jagathy Sreekumar
- Bhagyalakshmi
- Chithra
- Anuradha

== Soundtrack ==
The music was composed by K. J. Joy and the lyrics were written by Cheramangalam and Poovachal Khader.

| No. | Song | Singers | Lyrics | Length |
|---|---|---|---|---|
| 1 | "Hey Butterfly Njanoru" | K. S. Chithra | Cheramangalam | |
| 2 | "Maathala Mottu" | C. O. Anto, Krishnachandran | Poovachal Khader | |
| 3 | "Madanan Thirayum" | Vani Jairam | Cheramangalam | |
| 4 | "Premageethikal" | Vani Jairam, Chorus | Cheramangalam | |
