= Kaliyalla Kalyanam =

- Directed by: A. B. Raj
- Written by: Dr. Balakrishnan
- Screenplay by: Dr. Balakrishnan
- Produced by: T. P. Madhavan Nair
- Starring: Sathyan; Sharada; Sukumari; Jayabharathi
- Cinematography: R. N. Pillai
- Edited by: G. Venkittaraman
- Music by: A. T. Ummer
- Production company: Remuka Arts
- Distributed by: Remuka Arts
- Release date: 9 August 1968
- Country: India
- Language: [Malayalam

Kaliyalla Kalyanam (lit. 'Marriage is no joke') is a 1968 Indian Malayalam-language film, directed by A. B. Raj and produced by T. P. Madhavan Nair. The film stars Sathyan, Sharada, Sukumari and Jayabharathi in the lead roles. The film had musical score by A. T. Ummer.

== Cast ==
- Sathyan
- Sharada
- Sukumari
- Jayabharathi
- Adoor Bhasi
- Manavalan Joseph
- B. K. Mulloorkkara
- Bahadoor
- Dorai
- Kumaran
- Meena
- K. S. Parvathy
- S. P. Pillai
- Sachu

== Soundtrack ==
The music was composed by A. T. Ummer and the lyrics were written by Dr. Balakrishnan and P. Bhaskaran.

No.	Song	Singers	Lyrics	Length (m:ss)
1	"Ithuvare Pennoru"	L. R. Eeswari, Latha Raju, Sreelatha Namboothiri	Dr. Balakrishnan	
2	"Kannil Swapnathil"	S. Janaki, L. R. Eeswari	P. Bhaskaran	
3	"Malarkkinaavin Manimaalikayude"	K. J. Yesudas	P. Bhaskaran	
4	"Midumidukkan Meeshkkomban"	L. R. Eeswari, Sreelatha Namboothiri	P. Bhaskaran	
5	"Thaarunya Swapnangal"	S. Janaki, P. Jayachandran, [Latha Raju	P. Bhaskaran	
