= Kizhakkunarum Pakshi =

- Poster
- Directed by: Venu Nagavalli
- Written by: Venu Nagavalli
- Produced by: P. K. R. Pillai
- Starring: Mohanlal; Shankar; Murali; Rekha
- Cinematography: K. P. Nambiathiri
- Music by: Raveendran
- Production company: Shirdhi Sai Creations
- Distributed by: Shirdhi Sai Creations
- Release date: 17 October 1991
- Running time: 125 minutes
- Country: India
- Language: Malayalam

Kizhakkunarum Pakshi (transl. Bird that rises in the East) is a 1991 Indian Malayalam-language musical tragedy drama film written and directed by Venu Nagavalli and produced by P. K. R. Pillai. It stars Mohanlal, Shankar, Murali, Rekha, Jagathy Sreekumar, Ashokan and Innocent. The music and background score of the film was composed by Raveendran The film was released on 17 October 1991, and ended up as a box-office failure.

Synopsis: Ananthu comes back from USA now rich declares to his friends they will start a chorus group as Ananthu is a big music composer. Ananthu remember his past that made him go to USA. Meera is given singing chance in Varma studios and shows her talent in singing. Gopi also a singer arranges Meera singing chance with other music composer rajashejaran. One day Meera is made repeatedly singing without allowing to go to ananthus music recording but Meera leaves the area. Ananthu has clash with Gopi when Gopi tells Meera can sing with track and no need Ananthu to explain her but Ananthu didn't like this and small brawl happens between Ananthu and Gopi.next day Varma tells Ananthu Gopi tells Gopi does not sing if Ananthu is there. Ananthu gets advance one day to compose his music and made Meera to sing. But on the same day, goons come and attack Ananthu finally ananthu's mother gets killed. Ananthu revenges this goon by stabbing his leg deep with a broken glass bottle. Now in present-day Meera tells Ananthu after Ananthu went to USA her mother gets in illegal relationships with Gopi's friend and both of them leave the house and stays in Gopi's house. Gopi tried to approach Meena but Meena refuses so Gopi gives the singing chance to another singer instead of Meera. Gopi make padakuthira news editor to publish bad about Ananthu and Meera. Ananthu's friends brawls the padakuthira editors office. Ananthu scolds his friends and tells no more chorus group.Ananthu leaves to USA but comes back. Gopi tried to suppress Meera as a singer in the chorus instead of main singer with Gopi. Vaydi though friend to Ananthu was the person who invited Meera to Gopi's recording without knowing the insult for Meera. Vaydi tells Ananthu this insult and Ananthu decides before going to USA he will make a music for which Meera only sings as the main singer. Gopi manipulates and orchestra members withdraw from coming for Ananthu's recording. Ananthu calls back Johnny after offering pethidine packets as advance but Johnny throws away those and tells he is more comfortable with his best friendship with Ananthu and gets ready for the violin. Gopi tried to kidnap Meera but Ananthu saves her. On the day of recording, Meera gets a voice loss but recovers after Ananthu comforts her. Thus Ananthu and Meera gets a warm welcome at the recording office and Meera sings the song perfectly with memories of her mother's illegal relationships with Gopi's friend and finally getting to be seen by Ananthu who accepts her. After the song finishes, Meera cries vigorously and Ananthu comes and comforts her and embarrace her telling he won't allow Meera to cry in the further but same time Meera seen nonmoving. And finally sees Meera dead, Ananthu keeps crying, Varma consoles him telling Meera is deep in the music, better Ananthu should not leave and should continue his music here itself. Film ends showing Ananthu keeps singing in the recording chamber as lead.

== Cast ==
- Mohanlal as Ananthan / Ananthu
- Shankar as Gopi Krishnan
- Rekha as Meera
- Murali as Jacob, Anandhu's Friend
- Nedumudi Venu as Music Director Varma
- Jagathy Sreekumar as Vaidy, Anandhu's Friend
- Jagadish as Kunjambu, Anandhu's Friend
- Ashokan as Govindankutty, Anandhu's Friend
- Santhosh as Satheeshan, Anandhu's Friend
- Jyothi as Nimmy
- Innocent as Panicker
- Kaviyoor Ponnamma as Devu, Ananthu's Mother
- Karamana Janardanan Nair as Krishnan Nampoothiri, Ananthu's Father
- Mala Aravindan as Nanappan
- Nandu as Harindran, Anandhu's Friend
- Sankaradi as Lokanathan, Ananthu's uncle
- Thikkurissy Sukumaran Nair as former music director Moorthy
- T. P. Madhavan as Pillai
- Ajayan Adoor
- Sukumari as Doctor Aunty, Nimmy's mother
- Unnimary as Girija, Meera's Mother

== Production ==
Shankar played an antagonistic character for the first time in his career.

== Soundtrack ==
The film's soundtrack was composed by Raveendran, with lyrics penned by Konniyoor Bhas and K. Jayakumar. Sujatha Mohan received the Kerala Film Critics Association Award for Best Female Playback Singer for her renditions in this film and the movie Kankettu.

Soundtrack Album
#	Song	Singers	Raga
1	"Arunakirana"	K. J. Yesudas, K. S. Chithra, Chorus	Lavangi
2	"Arunakirana (F Dom)"	K. J. Yesudas, K. S. Chithra	Lavangi
3	"Hey Krishna"	K. S. Chithra, Chorus	Charukesi
4	"Kizhakkunarum Pakshi"	K. J. Yesudas, Sujatha Mohan	—
5	"Manchiraathukal"	K. J. Yesudas	—
6	"Souparnikaamritha"	K. J. Yesudas	Sudha Dhanyasi
7	"Souparnikaamritha"	Minmini	Sudha Dhanyasi

== Awards ==
- Kerala Film Critics Award for Best Female Playback Singer - Sujatha
