= Aadarsham =

Aadarsham may refer to:

- Aadharsam, a 1982 Indian Malayalam film
- Aadarsham (1993 film), a 1993 Telugu film
