= Kaalam (film) =

- Directed by: Hemachandran
- Written by: Hemachandran; Sreekavi (dialogues)
- Screenplay by: Sreekavi
- Produced by: R. S. Kothandaraman
- Starring: Jagathy Sreekumar; Menaka; Jayamalini; Jayaram
- Cinematography: Hemachandran
- Edited by: M. Vellaswamy
- Music by: Shankar–Ganesh
- Production company: Kalachithra Arts
- Distributed by: Kalachithra Arts
- Release date: 23 April 1982
- Country: India
- Language: Malayalam

Kaalam is a 1982 Indian Malayalam film, directed by Hemachandran and produced by R. S. Kothandaraman. The film stars Jagathy Sreekumar, Menaka, Jayamalini and Jayaram in the lead roles. The film has musical score by Shankar–Ganesh.

== Cast ==
- Jagathy Sreekumar as Gopalan
- Menaka as Jaya
- Jayamalini as Dancer
- Jayaram (old)
- K. R. Vijaya as Janaki
- Kaduvakulam Antony as Kurup
- Meena Menon as Asha
- Raveendran as Rajan
- Radhadevvi as Ammini

== Soundtrack ==
The music was composed by Shankar–Ganesh and the lyrics were written by Bichu Thirumala.

No.	Song	Singers	Lyrics	Length (m:ss)
1	"Kaalam Kaiviralaal"	K. J. Yesudas	Bichu Thirumala	
2	"Kaalam Kaiviralaal" (Bit)	K. J. Yesudas	Bichu Thirumala	
3	"Onamkeraamoolakkaari"	Malaysia Vasudevan	Bichu Thirumala	
4	"Puzhayoram Kuyil Paadi"	P. Jayachandran, Vani Jairam	Bichu Thirumala	
