= Pournami Raavil 3D =

- Theatrical release poster
- Directed by: A. Vincent
- Produced by: S. Kumar
- Starring: Viji; Vijayendra Ghatge; Anuradha; Janardhanan
- Cinematography: Ajayan Vincent; Jayanan Vincent
- Music by: Shankar–Ganesh
- Production company: Sastha Productions
- Release date: 14 October 1985
- Country: India
- Language: Malayalam

Pournami Raavil is a 1985 Indian Malayalam-language fantasy film, directed by A. Vincent and produced by S. Kumar. The film stars Viji, Vijayendra Ghatge, Anuradha and Janardanan. The film's score was composed by Shankar–Ganesh. The film was dubbed in Tamil as Kaattukulle Thiruvizha and in Kannada as Kaadinalli Jaatre. This was the second 3D film to be made in Malayalam.

== Cast ==
- Viji as Parvathi
- Vijayendra Ghatge as Ravi
- Anuradha
- Janardhanan
- Rohini
- R. N. Sudarshan as Mahendra Varma
- Kanchana
- Ceylon Manohar

== Production ==
The filming was held at Kodanad, Kerala. A fight scene with a leopard was shot at a forest at Chalakudy.

== Soundtrack ==
The music was composed by Shankar–Ganesh with lyrics by P. Bhaskaran.

Malayalam version

Song	Singers
"Kalyaanachekkan"	K. J. Yesudas, Chorus
"Paala Poothu"	S. Janaki
"Vaanin Maril"	K. J. Yesudas, Vani Jairam, Chorus

Kannada version

Song	Singers	Lyrics
"Nanjindra Nanji"	S. P. Balasubramanyam	R. N. Jayagopal
"Shilpi Kanase"	S. P. Balasubramaniam, Vani Jairam	R. N. Jayagopal
"Malay Arali"	S. Janaki	R. N. Jayagopal

Tamil version

Song	Singers	Lyrics
"Machina Machi"	Malaysia Vasudevan	Vaali
"Devan Magalo"	K. J. Yesudas, Vani Jairam	Vaali
"Pachaikodigal"	S. Janaki	Vaali

== Critical reception ==
Reviewing the Tamil version Kaattukulle Thiruvizha, Balumani of Anna wrote that despite being different from My Dear Kuttichathan, it was not up to the expectations and in spite of huge budget, the film does not feel complete but praised the acting and the climax. Jayamanmadhan of Kalki sarcastically wrote that someone who can tell a story after watching a film once, will be gifted with Vadapalani Studios and Mount Road Theatres.
