= Amme Bhagavathi =

1987 film

- Directed by: Sreekumaran Thampi
- Written by: Sreekumaran Thampi
- Screenplay by: Sreekumaran Thampi
- Starring: Shankar; Menaka; Sukumari; Jagathy Sreekumar
- Cinematography: C. Ramachandra Menon
- Edited by: G. Venkittaraman
- Music by: M. S. Viswanathan
- Production company: Devi Productions
- Distributed by: Devi Productions
- Release date: 9 January 1987
- Country: India
- Language: Malayalam

Amme Bhagavathi is a 1987 Indian Malayalam film, directed by Sreekumaran Thampi, starring Shankar, Menaka, Sukumari and Jagathy Sreekumar. The musical score is by M. S. Viswanathan. The film's plot is related to the Chottanikkara Bhagavathy Temple in Ernakulam district.

== Plot ==
Parvathy, a devotee of Goddess Durga, struggles to run her family. Goddess Durga comes in the form of Parvathy's daughter in order to teach a lesson to all those who trouble Parvathy.

== Cast ==
- Baby Shalini as Durga and Young Chottanikkara Devi
- Shankar as Sivankutty
- Menaka as Parvathy
- Sukumari as Ponnamma
- Jagathy Sreekumar
- Innocent as Brahmin
- Kalaranjini as Saraswathi
- Janardanan as Swami Siddhan
- Poojappura Ravi as Pappachan
- Lalithasree as Alamelu
- M. G. Soman as Police Officer & Ponnamma's Husband
- Sreenath as Thirumeni
- Thara Kalyan as Chottanikkara Devi (Special appearance)
- Suresh Bheemsingh

== Soundtrack ==
The music was composed by M. S. Viswanathan and the lyrics were written by Sreekumaran Thampi, who himself wrote, produced and directed this film.

No.	Song	Singers	Lyrics	Length (m:ss)
1	"Aayiram Ithalulla"	K. J. Yesudas, S. Janaki	Sreekumaran Thampi	
2	"Amme Bhagavathi"	K. J. Yesudas	Sreekumaran Thampi	
3	"Devi Sthothram"	K. S. Chithra	Traditional	
4	"Manassukal Paadunnu"	K. J. Yesudas, K. S. Chithra	Sreekumaran Thampi	
5	"Njaane Saraswathi"	K. J. Yesudas, K. S. Chithra	Sreekumaran Thampi	
