= Sahasame Jeevitham =

1984 Indian film by Bharati-Vasu

- Theatrical release poster
- Directed by: Bharati-Vasu
- Written by: Ganesh Patro (dialogues)
- Screenplay by: Bharati-Vasu
- Story by: Bharati-Vasu
- Produced by: P. Vimal Kumar; R. Vijaya Lakshmi
- Starring: Nandamuri Balakrishna; Vijji
- Cinematography: M. C. Shekar
- Edited by: B. Lenin; V. T. Vijayan
- Music by: Ilaiyaraaja
- Production company: Gaja Lakshmi Combines
- Release date: 1 June 1984
- Running time: 138 minutes
- Country: India
- Language: Telugu

Sahasame Jeevitham (transl. Life is an Adventure) is a 1984 Indian Telugu-language romance film directed by Bharati-Vasu. It stars Nandamuri Balakrishna and Vijji, with music composed by Ilaiyaraaja. The film is the debut of Balakrishna as a solo lead role without his father N. T. Rama Rao. Vasu, one of the directors later reused this plot for Tamil film Thottal Poo Malarum (2007).

== Cast ==
- Nandamuri Balakrishna as Ravi
- Viji as Chaaya
- Jaggayya as Gupta
- Prabhakar Reddy as Satyam
- Nagesh as Bus Conductor Babu Rao
- Thyagaraju as Gupta's brother-in-law
- C. H. Krishna Murthy as Driver Rayudu
- Hema Sundar as Manager
- Dileep as Dillep
- Rama Prabha as Babu Rao's wife
- M. Varalakshmi
- Jayavani

== Soundtrack ==
Music composed by Ilaiyaraaja. Lyrics were written by Veturi.

Song title	Singers	length
"Sagali Mana Yatra"	K. J. Yesudas	4:01
"Badalome Chandrama"	K. J. Yesudas	1:18
"Prema Nidhiki Viralamu"	K. J. Yesudas	4:26
"Mabbulo Chandamama"	K. J. Yesudas	3:40
"Veyyandi Baga Veyyandi"	S. P. Balasubrahmanyam	4:28
"Breake Vesthe"	K. J. Yesudas, S. Janaki	4:18
