= Sreeman Sreemathi =

- Directed by: Hariharan
- Written by: K. Balachander; Dr. Pavithran (dialogues)
- Screenplay by: Hariharan
- Produced by: Gopi
- Starring: Srividya; Vijayan; Bahadoor; MG Soman
- Cinematography: Melli Irani
- Edited by: G. Venkittaraman
- Music by: G. Devarajan
- Production company: Chithrakalasagar
- Distributed by: Chithrakalasagar
- Release date: 14 August 1981
- Country: India
- Language: Malayalam

Sreeman Sreemathi is a 1981 Indian Malayalam film, directed by Hariharan and produced by Gopi. The film stars Srividya, Vijayan, Bahadoor and M. G. Soman in the lead roles. The film has musical score by G. Devarajan. The film was a remake of Tamil film Avargal.

== Cast ==
- Srividya
- Vijayan
- Bahadoor
- M. G. Soman
- Nagesh
- Oduvil Unnikrishnan

== Soundtrack ==
The music was composed by G. Devarajan and the lyrics were written by Mankombu Gopalakrishnan.

No.	Song	Singers	Lyrics	Length (m:ss)
1	"Kanneerppoove Kamalappoove"	K. J. Yesudas	Mankombu Gopalakrishnan	
2	"Puthilanjikkaattile Thathamme"	P. Madhuri	Mankombu Gopalakrishnan	
3	"Raagam Anuraagam"	K. J. Yesudas	Mankombu Gopalakrishnan	
4	"Sringaara Devatha"	P. Madhuri	Mankombu Gopalakrishnan	
