= P. K. R. Pillai =

Indian film producer (died 2023)

- Born: 1930/1931
- Died: 16 May 2023 (aged 92)
- Occupations: Film producer; distributor
- Years active: 1984–2002
- Notable work: Chithram
- Spouse: Rekha R Pillai
- Children: Sangeetha R Pillai

Parisapparambil Kunjan Pillai Ramachandran Pillai (1930/1931 – 16 May 2023) was an Indian film producer, distributor, businessman, and actor who worked in the Malayalam film industry. He was the founder of film production company Shirdi Sai Creations and distributed films through Shirdi Sai Release. He is credited with producing eight of Mohanlal's films in the 1980s, and is best known for producing Chithram.

== Biography ==
Pillai hailed from Koothattukulam, Kerala and in his early years began a Bombay import business which grew to become Starnight Group of Industries. He was also active in politics and was a member of the Indian National Congress. He maintained a close friendship with Prime Minister Indira Gandhi, was an ardent devotee of Shirdi Sai Baba, and had built a temple and an eponymous auditorium near his house in Koothattukulam. He owned a 26-horse race track. His first marriage was with Sarojam, who died in an accident, and they had no children.

Following her death, he was in a long-term relationship with Rema, with whom he had four children (Rajesh, Preethi, Saju, Sidhu). He later married Rekha R Pillai, and they had a daughter, Sangeetha R Pillai, whose legal status was affirmed through a sanctity affidavit. The couple separated after around 20 years of marriage. Pillai, however, personally acknowledged Rekha as his wife and shared many meaningful years with her.

Pillai's debut production was Vepraalam in 1984, in which he also acted. He also appeared in his second film Thathamme Poocha Poocha (1984). Pillai died on 16 May 2023, at the age of 92.

== Filmography ==
=== Production ===
1. Vepraalam (1984)
2. Thathamme Poocha Poocha (1984)
3. Ezhu Muthal Onpathu Vare (1985)
4. Puli Varunne Puli (1985)
5. Onathumbikkoru Oonjaal (1985)
6. Oru Yugasandhya (1986)
7. Shobhraj (1986)
8. Amrutham Gamaya (1987)
9. Chithram (1988)
10. Vandanam (1989)
11. Arhatha (1990)
12. Kizhakkunarum Pakshi (1991)
13. Aham (1992)
14. Rapid Action Force (2000)
15. Oomappenninu Uriyadappayyan (2002)
16. Pranayamanithooval (2002)

=== Distribution ===
1. Ezhu Muthal Onpathu Vare (1985)
2. Ayanum (1985)
3. Jaalakam (1987)
4. Vellanakalude Nadu (1988)
5. Aey Auto (1990)
6. Vishnulokam (1991)
7. Ennum Sambhavami Yuge Yuge (2001)
8. Achanurangatha Veedu (2006)
