= Vijayan (actor) =

Indian actor

- Born: 17 May 1944; Tirur, Kerala, India
- Died: 22 September 2007 (aged 63); Chennai, Tamil Nadu, India
- Other name: Vijayan
- Occupation: Actor
- Years active: 1975 - 2007

Tirur Vijayan was an Indian actor, primarily working in Tamil and Malayalam films in the late 1970s and early 1980s as a hero before transitioning to supporting roles. He died following a cardiac arrest in 2007 while he was shooting for Aayudham Seivom. His wife was the niece of former Chief Minister of Kerala E. K. Nayanar.

== Partial filmography ==
=== Tamil ===
Year	Film	Role	Notes
1978	Kizhake Pogum Rail	Pattalathaar	
1979	Ponnu Oorukku Pudhusu		
1979	Niram Maaratha Pookkal	Vijayan	
1979	Oru Vidukadhai Oru Thodarkadhai	Thyagarajan (Thiyagu)	
1979	Uthiripookkal	Sundaravadivelu	
1979	Chakkalathi	Veerappan	
1979	Pasi	Rangan	
1980	Chinna Chinna Veedu Katti		
1980	Mattravai Neril		
1980	Malargale Malarungal		also storywriter
1980	Puthiya Adimaigal		unreleased
1980	Anbukku Naan Adimai	Gopinath's brother	
1980	Pournami Nilavil		
1980	Theru Vilakku		
1980	Kumari Pennin Ullathile		
1980	Valli Mayil		
1980	Meenakshi		
1980	Veli Thandiya Velladu		
1980	Oli Pirandhadhu		
1980	Vasantha Azhaippugal	Dr. Vijayan	
1981	Mayil		
1981	Sumai		
1981	Vaadagai Veedu		
1981	Kannadi		
1981	Kanneer Pookkal		
1983	Mann Vasanai	Mookkaiyan	
1985	Oru Kaidhiyin Diary	Dr. Unnikrishnan	
1986	Palaivana Rojakkal		Guest appearance
1987	Chinna Thambi Periya Thambi	Aarusamy	
1987	Cooliekkaran	Ramanathan	
1987	Nayakan	Durai	
1988	Kodi Parakuthu		Guest appearance
1989	Kadhal Enum Nadhiyinile		
1990	Oru Veedu Iru Vasal		
1991	Manasara Vazhthungalen		
1992	Unna Nenachen Pattu Padichen	Rathnasamy	
2002	Five Star	Mayilsamy	
2002	Run		
2002	Ramana	Bhadrinarayanan	
2003	Pallavan	Meena and Reena's father	
2003	Paarai	Vijayan	
2003	Diwan		
2004	7G Rainbow Colony	Kadhir's father	
2004	Kamaraj		Guest appearance
2004	Adhu		
2004	Singara Chennai	Bhuvana's father	
2005	Thirupaachi	City Police Commissioner	
2005	Alaiyadikkuthu		
2006	Kusthi		
2011	Sathurangam		Filmed in 2004; delayed release

=== Malayalam ===
Year	Film	Role	Note
1975	Utharayanam		
1975	Kalyaanappanthal		
1975	Pravaham	Raman	
1976	Udyaanalakshmi		
1976	Srishti		
1980	Arangum Aniyarayum	Aathman	
1981	Guha	Prabhu	
1981	Sreemaan Sreemathi		
1981	Kayam		
1982	Vidhichathum Kothichathum	Rajan	
1983	Asthram		
1984	Ethirppukal		
1985	Njaan Piranna Naattil	Surendran	
1985	Aarodum Parayaruthu		
1986	Ente Shabdam	I.G	
1986	Ithramathram	Johny	
1988	August 1	Muniyandi Thevar	
1989	Ivalente Kaamuki		
1989	Padippura		
1989	Adikkurippu		
1990	Sankarankuttikkoru Pennuvenam		
1990	Sthreekku Vendi Sthree		
1991	Shesham Screenil		
1994	Gaandeevam		
1994	Bharanakoodam	Minister	
2000	Mister Butler		
2001	Goa		
2002	Njaan Raajaavu	Antony	
2005	Kochi Rajavu	Parthasarathy	
