= Panchagni =

- Directed by: Hariharan
- Written by: M. T. Vasudevan Nair
- Produced by: G. P. Vijayakumar; M. G. Gopinath
- Starring: Mohanlal; Geetha; Nadia Moidu; Thilakan
- Cinematography: Shaji N. Karun
- Edited by: M. S. Mani
- Music by: Bombay Ravi; Pukazhenthi (score)
- Production company: Seven Arts Films
- Distributed by: Seven Arts Release
- Release date: 1 February 1986
- Running time: 140 minutes
- Country: India
- Language: Malayalam

Panchagni (transl. Five fires) is a 1986 Indian Malayalam-language crime drama film directed by Hariharan and written by M. T. Vasudevan Nair. The story is loosely inspired from the life of naxalite K. Ajitha who was part of the Naxalite movement in Kerala in the 1960s. The film tells the story of Indira, a Naxalite who comes out from prison on parole, while she serves a life sentence for killing a landlord. It stars Mohanlal, Geetha, Nadia Moidu, and Thilakan. It features songs composed by Bombay Ravi and a score by Pukazhenthi. The cinematography was done by Shaji N. Karun. Geetha's performance was considered noteworthy, and it established a bright career for her in the Malayalam film industry. She was even nominated for the National Award category for Best Actress.

== Plot ==
The film follows Indira, a Naxal activist on a two-week parole from Cannanore Central Jail, where she is serving a life sentence for killing Avarachan—a landlord she witnessed murder a young tribal woman after he raped and impregnated her.

Indira's mother, a former freedom fighter who is on her deathbed, is relieved to see her and is under the impression that she is free now. Her younger sister, Savithri, her husband, Prabhakaran, and her nephew are happy to have her back home. But her younger brother, Ravi, an unemployed youth, addicted to drugs is angered by her mere presence, blaming her for his inability to secure a good job. Indira's older brother, who is home from Delhi to perform the death rites of her mother, refuses to even talk to her and leaves after a big quarrel, leaving his nephew to do the rites. Most of her acquaintances are intimidated by her, except her old classmate Sharadha. Sharadha had married her college sweetheart, Rajan, and lives close to Indira's home.

Rasheed, a freelance journalist, tries to get an interview with Indira. She declines initially and is annoyed by his persistence.

As the days pass on, Indira feels unwanted and ends up having no place to live. Savithri suspects an affair between her husband and Indira, making it hard for Indira to stay with them. Sharadha's husband has changed a lot in years and has degraded himself into a womanizer. Hence, Indira can't stay with them either. Ultimately, Indira asks Rasheed for help and ends up staying at his place.

With time, Indira and Rasheed get closer, and a lovely relationship blossoms between the two. As Indira is nearing the completion of her parole, Rasheed, with great difficulty, succeeds in getting the government remission order in time, so that Indira no longer has to go back to jail. By then, Savithri and Ravi reconcile with Indira and are overjoyed to hear about her release. Indira rushes to Sharadha's place to share the good news, but there she is shocked to see Sharadha’s maid Malu being gang-raped by her husband Rajan and friends. True to her righteous self, Indira ends up shooting Rajan with his hunting rifle and ultimately surrenders herself at the police station.

== Cast ==
- Mohanlal as Rasheed
- Geetha as Indira
- Nadia Moidu as Savithri
- Thilakan as Raman
- Devan as Prabhakaran Nair
- Nedumudi Venu as Shekharan
- Murali as Rajan
- Chithra as Sarada
- Roshni as Malu
- Prathapachandran as Avarachan
- M. G. Soman as Mohandas
- Meghanathan as Ravi
- Lalitha Sree as Convict at jail
- Babu Antony as Sajan, a Naxal activist
- Kunjandi
- Subair as Babu, another Naxal activist
- Lekshmi Krishnamoorthy

== Production ==
Panchagni is loosely inspired from the life of naxalite activist K. Ajitha who was an active part of the Naxalite movement that took place in Kerala in the 1960s. It was one of the few films in Malayalam that discussed the naxals.

After M. T. Vasudevan Nair completed the screenplay of Panchagni, Hariharan decided to produce the film himself under his company Gayathri Cinema. During the pre-production of the film, G. P. Vijayakumar telephoned Hariharan and informed his wish to produce a Hariharan-M.T. Vasudevan Nair film under his newly formed production company, Seven Arts. Hariharan agreed and handed over the production to Vijayakumar. Initially, Naseeruddin Shah was cast in the role of news reporter Rasheed, per the suggestion of Nair. Shah signed the film and was given advance payment. Later, Mohanlal met Hariharan informing him of his wish to act in their film, but the casting process was already over by then. But after that meeting, Hariharan changed his mind and thought of casting him in the role of Rasheed. He talked the matter with Nair, and Mohanlal was fixed. In a later interview in 2000, Hariharan recalled: "When we asked Mohanlal whether he would do the film, he said he would do 'any role'. The first thing I wanted was to give him a different appearance. Till then, he hadn't appeared without a moustache. So I asked him to shave it off. He immediately agreed. Panchagni went on to become a turning point in his career". Initially, Ambika was chosen for the role of Indira, but she could not sign the film due to scheduling conflicts with a Kannada film, which she later regretted. Geetha was finalised for the role. Ambika said in a later interview in 2017 that Panchagni and Chithram are the two films in her career that she feels sad that she could not join. The scene where aggressive dogs are set on a young tribal woman by a landlord was shot by cinematographer J. Williams.

== Soundtrack ==
All lyrics are written by O. N. V. Kurup; all music is composed by Bombay Ravi BGM: Pugazhendhi.

No.	Title	Singer	Length
1.	"Aa Rathri"	K. S. Chithra	4:25
2.	"Saagarangale"	K. J. Yesudas	4:18

== Release ==
The film was released on 1 February 1986.

Upon release, Panchagni received widespread critical acclaim and performed well at the box office, becoming one of the highest-grossing Malayalam films of the year. The film ran for more than 200 days in theatres. Indira is regarded by critics as one of the most powerful female characters in Indian cinema. Panchagni is now considered a classic in Malayalam cinema. Its screenplay is considered one of the best works of Vasudevan Nair. The film was remade in Tamil as Nyaya Tharasu (1989).

== Awards ==
Kerala State Film Awards

- Best Screenplay – M. T. Vasudevan Nair
- Second Best Actor – Thilakan

Kerala Film Critics Association Awards

- Second Best Film
- Best Actor – Thilakan
- Best Actress – Geetha
- Best Lyricist – O. N. V. Kurup
- Best Music Director – Ravi Bombay
- Best Male Playback Singer – K. J. Yesudas

Filmfare Awards South

- Best Director (Malayalam) – Hariharan
