= Balu Kiriyath =

Indian Malayalam film director, script writer and lyricist

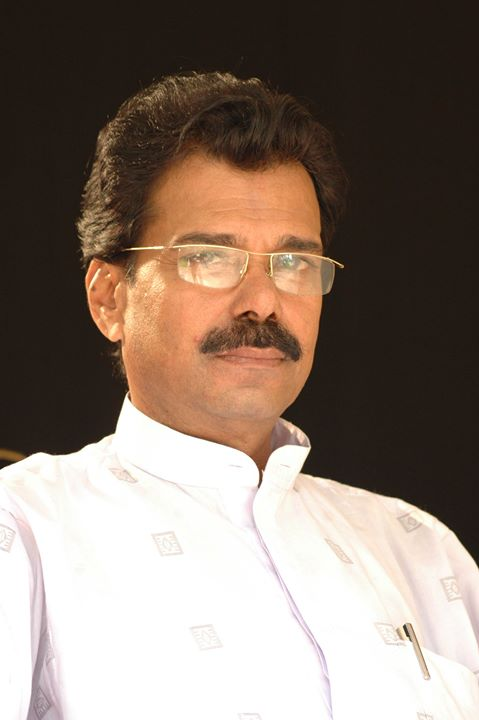
- Born: 29 November 1954 (age 71); Alwaye, Travancore Cochin, India
- Occupations: director, lyricist, screenwriter
- Years active: 1981 – 1998
- Spouse: Lakshmi Kiriyath
- Children: Paarvati Kiriyath Bharath , Bharath Kiriyath
- Relatives: Bichu Thirumala, Rajan Kiriyath , Travancore Sisters, Shobhana, K. M. Panikkar, Kavalam Narayana Panicker

Balu Kiriyath is an Indian Malayalam film lyricist, screenwriter and director.

== Early life ==
He was born on 29 November 1954 in Alwaye as son of R.S. Pillai and C.P. Malathy Amma. He was the first district President of KSC (Trivandrum) and general secretary of Malayalam Cine Technicians Association (MACTA) in 2012. He was also the director of Kerala state Film development corporation for 10 years and served as member secretary of Vilopilly samskrithi Bhavan and director mpcc; department of culture government of Kerala for 4 years.

== Personal life ==
He is married to Lakshmi and the couple have two Children

== Filmography ==
=== Direction ===
- Thakilukottaampuram (1981)
- Visa (1983)
- Thathamme Poocha Poocha (1984)
- Onnum Mindaatha Bhaarya (1984)
- Enganeyundashaane (1984)
- Paavam Poornima (1984)
- Nayakan (Vaa Kuruvi Varu Kuruvi) (1985)
- Vendor Daniel State Licency (1994)
- Mimics Super 1000 (1994)
- Kalyaanji Aanandji (1995)
- Mimics Action 500 (1995)
- Kalamasseriyil Kalyanayogam (1995)
- Sulthaan Hyderali (1996)
- King Soloman (1996)
- Moonnu Kodiyum 300 Pavanum (1997)
- Maayaajaalam (1998)

=== Screenplay ===
- Thakilukottaampuram (1981)
- Visa (1983)
- Onnum Mindaatha Bhaarya (1984)
- Enganeyundashaane (1984)
- Paavam Poornima (1984)
- Aattakkadha (1987)

=== Dialogue ===
- Thakilukottaampuram (1981)
- Visa (1983)
- Onnum Mindaatha Bhaarya (1984)
- Enganeyundashaane (1984)
- pavam poornima (1984)
- Aattakkadha (1987)
- Adholokam (1988)

=== Story ===
- Onnum Mindaatha Bhaarya (1984)
- Aattakkadha (1987)
- Adholokam (1988)
- Kalamasseriyil Kalyaanayogam (1995)

=== Art direction ===
- Nayakan (Vaa Kuruvi Varu Kuruvi) (1985)
