= Pattom Sadan =

Indian Malayalam actor

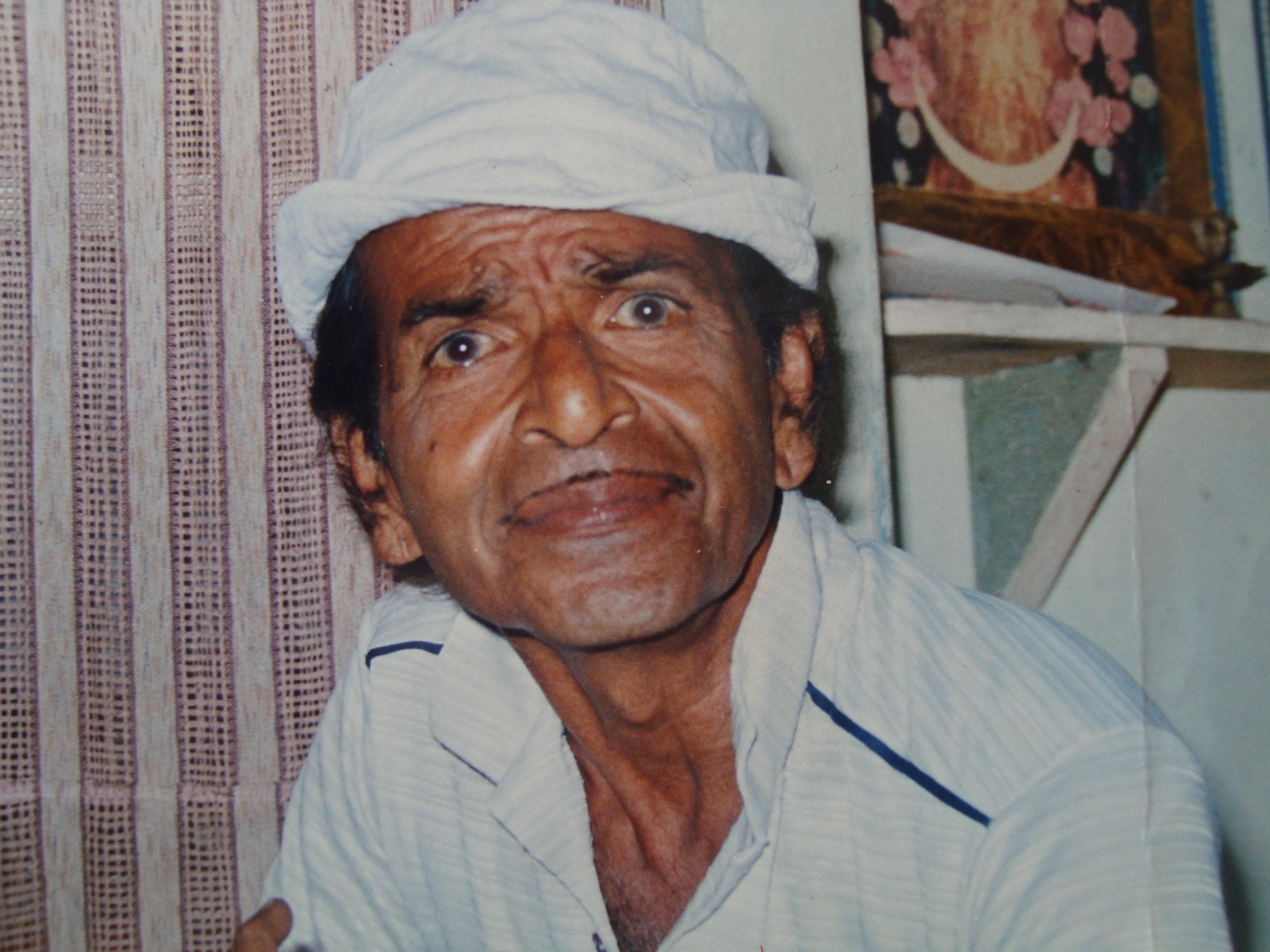
- Occupation: Film actor
- Years active: 1961–1992

Sadhasivan, popularly known as Pattom Sadan was an Indian actor in Malayalam cinema. He acted in more than 200 films. His debut movie was Chathurangam in 1959. He was a famous comedy artist during the 1960s and 1970s. He acted in many Tamil movies as well. He was a theatre artist turned movie actor. Hailing from Pattom, Thiruvananthapuram, he started his career with drama and later moved to Tamil movies. He was married and has two children. The family resided at Vadapalani, Chennai. He died at a private hospital at Vadapalani in 1992.

== Filmography ==
=== Malayalam ===
- Hijack (1995) as Thankappan
- Simhadhwani (1992)
- Kaumaara Swapnangal (1991)
- Chakkikotha Chankaran (1989)
- Malayathippennu (1989)
- Bheekaran (1988)
- Ormayil Ennum (1988) as Kuruppu
- Loose Loose Arappiri Loose (1988)
- Jungle Boy (1987) as Velappan
- Aalorungi Arangorungi (1986)
- Kiraatham (1985) as Santhappan
- Prathijnja (1983) as Charayam Paramu
- Varanmaare Aavashyamundu (1983)
- Bandham (1983)
- Benz Vasu (1980)
- Vijayam Nammude Senaani (1979)
- Vaaleduthavan Vaalaal (1979)
- Aval Niraparaadhi (1979)
- Avano Atho Avalo (1979)
- Madanolsavam (1978)
- Beena (1978)
- Velluvili (1978) as Kuttappan
- Naalumanippookkal (1978)
- Aaravam (1978)
- Balapareekshanam (1978)
- Madhurikkunna Raathri (1978)
- Kaithappoo (1978)
- Anugraham (1977) as Mathew
- Amme Anupame (1977)
- Sujatha (1977)
- Snehayamuna (1977)
- Kaavilamma (1977)
- Niraparayum Nilavilakkum (1977)
- Minimol (1977)
- Satyavan Savithri (1977)
- Manassoru Mayil (1977)
- Ammaayi Amma (1977)
- Priyamvada (1976)
- Vanadevatha (1976) as Velu
- Chirikkudukka (1976) as Naanu
- Themmadi Velappan (1976) as Claver
- Kaamadhenu (1976)
- Theekkanal (1976)
- Cheenavala (1975)
- Kaamam Krodham Moham (1975)
- Kalyaanappanthal (1975)
- Chandanachola (1975)
- Aval Oru Thandar Katha (1975) as Bommai
- Love Letter (1975)
- Love Marriage (1975)
- Ullaasayaathra (1975)
- Boy Friend (1975)
- Babumon (1975) as Appunni
- Check Post (1974)
- College Girl (1974) as Haider
- Udayam Kizhakku Thanne (1978)
- Alakal (1974)
- Urvashi Bharathi (1973)
- Thaniniram(1973) as Sukumarankutty
- Ladies Hostel (1973) as Punewala
- Manthrakodi(1972)
- Jalakanyaka (1971)
- Nishaagandhi (1970)
- Nizhalattam(1970) as Band Master
- Kaattukurangu (1969)
- Agnipareeksha (1968) as Manoharan
- Lakshaprabhu (1968)
- Collector Malathy (1967) as Sarasan
- Jeevikkaan Anuvadikkoo (1967)
- Jeevithayaathra (1965)
- Arappavan (1961) as Balan

== Tamil ==
- Avana Ivan (1962)
- Bommai (1964) as Sampath
- Raman Ethanai Ramanadi (1970) as Sivaji Ganesan's Village friend
