= Aagneyam =

- ആഗ്നേയം
- Directed by: P. G. Viswambharan
- Written by: John Zakaria; Kaloor Dennis
- Starring: Jayaram; Nedumudi Venu; Sunitha; Gautami; Maathu; Sankaradi; Thilakan
- Cinematography: K .P. Nambiyathiri
- Edited by: G. Murali
- Music by: songs:Johnson Background Music: Rajamani
- Release date: 27 August 1993
- Running time: 117 minutes
- Country: India
- Language: Malayalam

Aagneyam is a 1993 Malayalam-language film directed by P. G. Viswambharan and written by John Zakaria and Kaloor Dennis, starring Jayaram, Nedumudi Venu, Sunitha, Gautami, Maathu, Sankaradi, Thilakan, and Mala Aravindan in the lead roles.

== Plot ==
Madhavaan Kutty, an Ayurvedic doctor, is sentenced to capital punishment for twin murders. Mathew Stephan, the jail superintendent, trusts that Madhavan Kutty is innocent. His appeal at Supreme Court is still pending. Learning that his sister has attempted to commit suicide, and his mother has fallen ill, Madhavan Kutty decides to escape. He misuses his freedom at the residence of Mathew Stephan to escape in disguise in a police uniform. Alarmed at the jailbreak, the police search for him. Madhavan Kutty reaches a forest area and is attacked by Velayudhan Ashan who mistakes him for an animal. Upon seeing him wounded, Velayudhan Asan takes him to his residence. Madhavan Kutty decides to stay there for the time being. In the meantime, Nandakumar, the police inspector, is assigned the charge of capturing Madhavan Kutty. He is shocked to see Shobha Menon, his once girlfriend, be the wife of Nandakumar. Velu Asan after realizing who Madhavan Kutty is, decides to save him. His ailing mother dies before Madhavan Kutty can meet her. In rage, he decides to attend the funeral of his mother to perform the last rites. Once the function is over, he surrenders to Nandakumar. Velu Asan confesses to the authorities that Madhavan Kutty is innocent and in reality, the two murders were committed by him in revenge for the death of his daughter. Madhavan Kutty is thus released free to join his family.

== Cast ==
- Jayaram as Dr.Madhavan Kutty/Raghavan
- Nedumudi Venu as Mathew Stephan
- Thilakan as Velayudhan Aashan
- Sunitha as Ramani
- Gautami as Shobha Nandakumar Menon
- Maathu as Emi Mathew Stephan
- Siddique as C.I Nandakumar
- Vijayaraghavan as Mammali
- Mala Aravindan as Sukumaran Pillai
- Innocent as Pappachan
- Sukumari as Bhageerathi
- Sankaradi as Ammavan
- Mamukkoya as Mukkathu Moosa
- Indrans as Rajappan
- Shivaji as Krishnadas
- Jose Pellissery as Rappayi
- Jagannatha Varma as IG Ashokan Menon
- Beena Antony as Sunitha
- Santhakmari as Mammali's mother
- Thesni Khan

== Soundtrack ==
- "Manjumanjeera (female)" - KS Chithra
- "Manjumanjeera (male)" - KJ Yesudas
- "Nataraajamandapam" - KJ Yesudas
