= Sreekumar Krishnan Nair =

Indian film director

K. Sreekumar
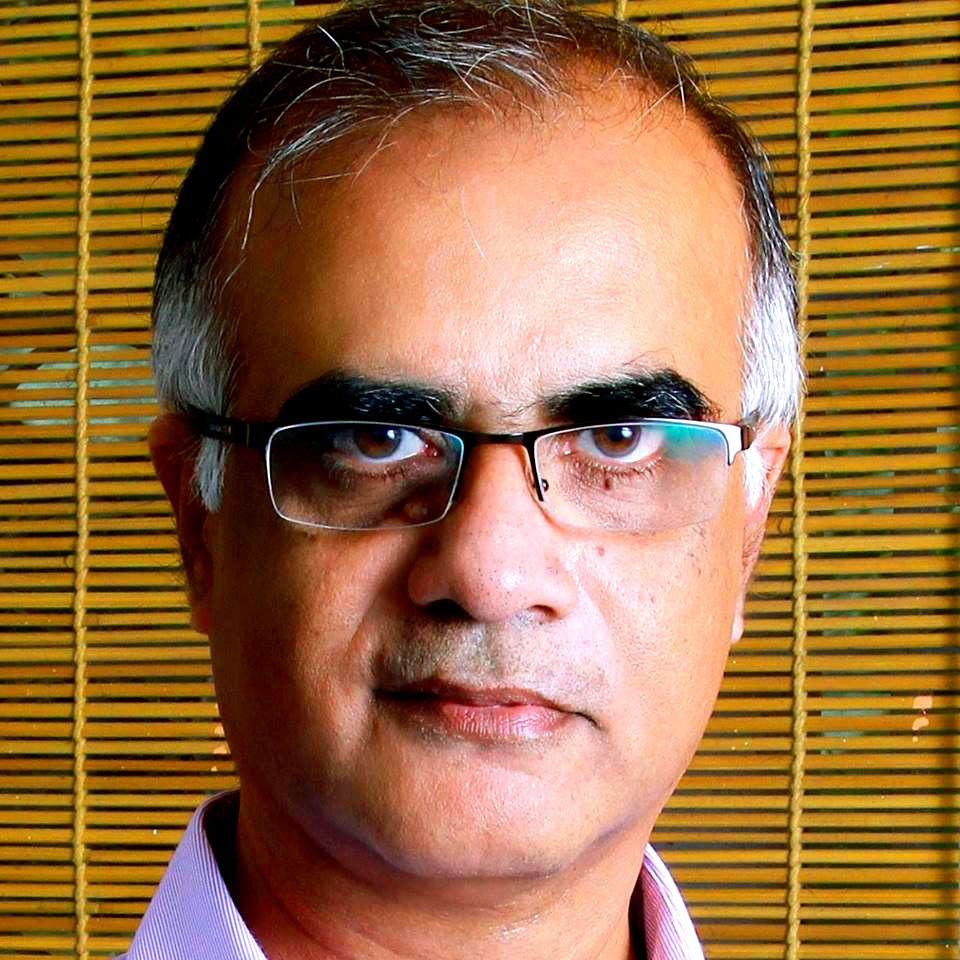
- Born: 17 June 1961 (age 65); Thiruvananthapuram, Kerala, India
- Other name: K. Shrikuttan
- Occupations: Filmmaker; Entrepreneur
- Known for: O' Faby (1993)
- Notable work: Director: O'Faby, Thakshasila, Pavakooth
- Parents: M. Krishnan Nair; Sulochana Devi
- Relatives: K. Jayakumar (Brother)

Sreekumar Krishnan Nair (born 17 June 1961), better known by his stage name K. Sreekumar or K. Shrikuttan, is an Indian filmmaker, best known for directing the 1993 film O' Faby, which was India's first full-length live action/animation hybrid feature film. He is the youngest son of prolific south Indian filmmaker M. Krishnan Nair and younger brother of Retired Indian Administrative Service officer, poet and lyricist K. Jayakumar.

Prior to making films as a director, Sreekumar served as an A.D. (First Assistant Director, Second-Unit Director and Chief Associate Director) under prominent South Indian filmmaker, Hariharan, who in turn served as an assistant of his father. His stint with director Hariharan was more than a decade long, working on seventeen films together, among which eight were scripted by 'Padma Bhushan' awardee and Jnanpith laureate M. T. Vasudevan Nair, one of the greatest scenarists in Indian film history. He was the Chief Associate Director of the Indian classic Oru Vadakkan Veeragatha. He has also directed several television commercials and documentaries. Directed the first mega serial, Vamsham (1997–1998) in DD Malayalam . The television channel operated by Doordarshan, India's national broadcaster.

He was commissioned to direct the epic historical film Marthanda Varma in 2011, filmed simultaneously in English and Malayalam (spoken in the Indian state of Kerala and the surrounding area). The project eventually got shelved. He subsequently served as the strategy director of Tecgemini.

He was CEO of the streaming media and video-on-demand platform Inetscreen.

Board member of the Central Board of Film Certification (CBFC). 2012 – 2015. It is a statutory film certification body in the Ministry of Information and Broadcasting of the Government of India.

== Filmography ==
=== As Second-Unit Director / Chief Assistant Director ===
- All films in Malayalam language except were noted.

Year	Film	Director	Screenwriter	Notes
1980	Lava	Hariharan	Hariharan	
1980	Anuraagakkodathi	Hariharan	Hariharan	
1981	Valarthumrugangal	Hariharan	M. T. Vasudevan Nair	
1981	Sreeman Sreemathi	Hariharan	Hariharan	
1982	Anguram	Hariharan	Hariharan	
1983	Varanmaare Aavashyamundu	Hariharan	Hariharan	
1983	Evideyo Oru Shathru	Hariharan	M. T. Vasudevan Nair	Unreleased
1984	Poomadathe Pennu	Hariharan	Hariharan	
1984	Vikatakavi	Hariharan	Hariharan	
1985	Vellam	Hariharan	M. T. Vasudevan Nair	
1986	Panchagni	Hariharan	M. T. Vasudevan Nair	
1986	Nakhakshathangal	Hariharan	M. T. Vasudevan Nair	
1987	Anjaam	Hariharan	Hariharan	Hindi language film
1987	Amrutham Gamaya	Hariharan	M. T. Vasudevan Nair	
1987	Mangai Oru Gangai	Hariharan	Vallabhan	Tamil language film
1987	Aranyakam	Hariharan	M. T. Vasudevan Nair	
1989	Oru Vadakkan Veeragatha	Hariharan	M. T. Vasudevan Nair	
1990	Kadavu	M. T. Vasudevan Nair	M. T. Vasudevan Nair	
1992	Sargam	Hariharan	Hariharan	

=== As Director ===
Year	Film	Language	Cast	Notes
1990	Pavakkoothu	Malayalam feature film	Jayaram, Parvathy, Ranjini	
1993	O' Faby	Malayalam	Nagesh, Thilakan, Ilavarasi, Roque	India's first full-length live action/animation hybrid feature film.
1995	Thakshashila	Malayalam	Suresh Gopi, Shanthi Krishna	
TBA	Vignaanian	Tamil	TBA	A feature film on Dr. A. P. J. Abdul Kalam's scientific accomplishments.
