= August 15 Raatri =

Indian Telugu-language drama film

- Directed by: P. N. Ramachandra Rao
- Screenplay by: P. N. Ramachandra Rao
- Produced by: G. Reddi Sekhar; J. Gopal Reddy; P. Parthasarathi Reddy
- Starring: Arjun; Sarath Babu; Gautami
- Cinematography: Kabir Lal
- Edited by: B. Lenin; V. T. Vijayan
- Music by: Satyam
- Production company: Susheela Arts
- Release date: 18 November 1988
- Country: India
- Language: Telugu

August 15 Raatri (transl. Night of August 15) is a 1988 Indian Telugu-language drama film directed by P. N. Ramachandra Rao and starring Arjun, Sarath Babu and Gautami.

== Cast ==
- Arjun as Abhimanyu
- Sarath Babu as Ravindra
- Gautami
- Ranjini
- Giri Babu as Vajram
- Sudhakar
- Pradeep Shakthi
- R. N. Sudarshan
- P. L. Narayana as the doctor
- Rallapalli
- Prasad Babu
- Hema Sundar as a victim's father
- Thyagaraju
- Narra Venkateswara Rao
- Bhaktavatsalam
- C.H. Krishnamurthy
- Ashok Kumar
- Rajyalakshmi
- Kuyili (special appearance in the song "Lasku Labo")
- Y. Vijaya
- Baby Shalini

== Soundtrack ==
The music was composed by Satyam.

Track listing
No.	Title	Singer(s)	Length
1.	"Idi Madhumasam"	K. J. Yesudas, K. S. Chithra	4:52
2.	"Andale Virisina"	S. Janaki, S. P. Balasubrahmanyam	4:17
3.	"Bhama Vaddu"	S. P. Balasubrahmanyam, P. Susheela	4:34
4.	"Lasku Labo"	S. Janaki, S. P. Balasubrahmanyam	4:13
Total length:			17:56

== Reception ==
A critic from Zamin Ryot wrote that "Even with the usual story and the usual fighting, the film runs smoothly thanks to the director".

== Home media ==
The film was telecast on ETV Cinema on 1 January 2024 at 10 p.m. and on Jio TV on 2 July 2024 at 2:30 a.m.
