= Pavakkoothu =

1990 film by Sreekumar Krishnan Nair

- Directed by: Sreekumar Krishnan Nair (as K. Sreekuttan)
- Written by: Ranjith
- Produced by: Panthalam Gopinath
- Starring: Jayaram; Parvathy Jayaram; Ranjini; Innocent; Nedumudi Venu
- Cinematography: Anandakuttan
- Edited by: M.S Mani
- Music by: Johnson
- Production company: Santhi Cine Arts
- Distributed by: Santhi Cine Arts
- Release date: 1990
- Country: India
- Language: Malayalam

Pavakkoothu (transl. Puppet show) is a 1990 Indian Malayalam-language film, directed by Sreekumar Krishnan Nair (as Sreekuttan) and produced by Panthalam Gopinath. It stars Jayaram, Parvathy, Ranjini, and Innocent. The film is a remake of the 1984 American movie Micki & Maude.

It has a musical score by Johnson. Earlier in 1987, this film was already made in Tamil, as Rettai Vaal Kuruvi (lit. 'Two-tailed Sparrow') starring Mohan, Radhika, and Archana, with direction by Balu Mahendra and Abdul Kader as producer, with excellent music by Ilayaraja.

== Plot ==
Pavakoothu is a story of a couple, Prakash and Sumitra. Prakash has an extra-marital affair with Krishna. Both his wife and girlfriend get pregnant at the same time. He tries to hide it from both using shenanigans resembling a puppet show, but finally, they come to know the truth in the moments they are rolled on to the labour room in the same hospital. Sumitra develops complications during delivery and the baby dies. She also had to have her uterus removed, so she will never conceive a baby again. Meanwhile, Krishna learns of Sumitra's situation, gives her baby to the couple, and leaves.

== Cast ==
- Jayaram as Prakash
- Parvathy Jayaram as Sumitra
- Ranjini as Krishna
- Innocent as Chakkochen
- Mamukkoya as Kanjirakutti
- M. G. Soman as M. P. Purushothaman Pilla
- Nedumudi Venu as Padit Adithya Varma
- Valsala Menon as Malathy Ramachandran, Dooradarshan Director
- Philomena as Nurse
- Poojappura Radhakrishnan as Moorthy
- Kalabhavan Rahman as Attender
- T. P. Madhavan as Doctor
- Trichur Elsi as Doctor

== Trivia ==
- This movie contains the famous comedy sequence in which Mamukkoya, playing a writer, describes a copycat version of Ramayana with merely names changed, as his new story.
- The movie ends with shots of Krishna wishing that Prakash and Sumithra would name the baby Malavika, so they could call her Malu. Coincidentally, the actors Jayaram and Parvathy married in real life two years later and their girl child born in 1996 was in fact named Malavika.

== Soundtrack ==
The music was composed by Johnson with lyrics by K Jayakumar.

No.	Song	Singers	Lyrics	Length (m:ss)
1	"Kaamini Mullakal"	K. S. Chithra	K. Jayakumar	
2	"Oru Theeyalayil"	M. G. Sreekumar	K. Jayakumar	
3	"Saarangi Maarilaniyum"	Unni Menon, Ranjini Menon	K. Jayakumar	
