= Surumaitta Kannukal =

- Directed by: S. Konnanatt
- Written by: P. A. Muhammed Koya
- Screenplay by: P. A. Muhammed Koya
- Produced by: K. Manoharan; K. Sreedharan
- Starring: Vijayaraghavan; Bahadoor; K. P. Ummer; Nellikode Baskaran; Kunjandi; Sunanda; Santha Devi
- Cinematography: U. Rajagopal
- Edited by: G. Venkittaraman
- Music by: K. Raghavan
- Production company: Narayani Cine Arts
- Distributed by: Narayani Cine Arts
- Release date: 25 March 1983
- Country: India
- Language: Malayalam

Surumaitta Kannukal is a 1983 Indian Malayalam film, directed by S. Konnanatt and produced by K. Manoharan and K. Sreedharan. The film stars Vijayaraghavan, Bahadoor, K. P. Ummer, Mamukkoya and Sunanda in the lead roles. The film's music was composed by K. Raghavan.

== Cast ==
- Vijayaraghavan
- K. P. Ummer
- Bahadoor
- Nellikode Bhaskaran
- Kunjandi
- Mamukkoya
- Sunanda
- Vijayalakshmi
- Santha Devi
- Santhakumari
- Kuttyedathi Vilasini

== Soundtrack ==
The music was composed by K. Raghavan and the lyrics were written by P. Bhaskaran.

No.	Song	Singers	Lyrics	Length (m:ss)
1	"Aathiraappaattinte"	P. Madhuri, Vani Jairam	P. Bhaskaran	
2	"Anchanchara" (Paarkkalaam)	C. O. Anto	P. Bhaskaran	
3	"Arabikkadale Arabikkadale"	K. J. Yesudas	P. Bhaskaran	
4	"Pandu Kandaal"	Chorus, Kalyani Menon	P. Bhaskaran	
