= Kingini =

- Directed by: A. N. Thampi
- Written by: R. Pavithran
- Screenplay by: R. Pavithran
- Produced by: A. N. Thampi
- Starring: Prem Kumar, Ranjini
- Cinematography: Prasad Chenkilath
- Edited by: Valliyappan
- Music by: Kannur Rajan
- Production company: Kavyasangeetha
- Release date: 7 December 1992
- Country: India
- Language: Malayalam

Kingini is a 1992 Indian Malayalam film, directed by A. N. Thampi, starring Prem Kumar and Ranjini in the lead roles.

== Cast ==
- Ashokan as Baiju Prakash
- Jagathy Sreekumar as Nayappi
- Nedumudi Venu as Somadathan Namboothiri
- Prem Kumar as Luke Mathew
- Jagannatha Varma as Valiya Thirumeni
- Jagannathan as Thirumeni
- Kamal Roy as Mahesh
- Kunchan as Chandi Thomas
- Mamukkoya as Kuttappan
- Ranjini as Nandini
- Aranmula Ponnamma as Mahesh's grandmother
- Innocent as Govindan
- Thodupuzha Vasanthi as Kalyani
- Sreelatha as college student
- Sasikala as Kingini's mother
- Sujatha as Kingini

== Soundtrack ==
Music was by Kannur Rajan, with lyrics by Bichu Thirumala, Mayooram Thankappan Nair, A. N. Thambi. The background score of this film was done by Darshan Raman. Recordist is Irshad Hussain at Chithranjali Studio, Thiruvananthapuram.

- "Kurinjippoove" - Ashalatha
- "Kurinjippoove" (Pathos) - Ashalatha
- "Maanasalola Marathaka Varna" - K. J. Yesudas
- "Malar Chorum" - Kanjangad Ramachandran
- "Mounam Polum" - K. J. Yesudas
