= Paasam Oru Vesham =

- Title card
- Directed by: P. Jayadevi
- Screenplay by: P. Jayadevi
- Based on: Sotthupattalam by S. Samuthiram
- Produced by: N. Pandiyan
- Starring: Ranjini; Madhuri; Disco Shanti
- Cinematography: V. Prabhakararan
- Edited by: Chakrapani
- Music by: Shyam
- Production company: Liberty Films
- Release date: December 1987
- Country: India
- Language: Tamil

Paasam Oru Vesham (/veɪʃəm/ transl. Affection is a disguise) is a 1987 Indian Tamil-language film directed and co-written by P. Jayadevi. It is based on the novel Sotthupattalam by S. Samuthiram. The film stars Ranjini, Madhuri and Disco Shanti. It was released in December 1987.

== Cast ==
- Ranjini
- Madhuri
- Disco Shanti
- Vinu Chakravarthy
- Nassar
- Thyagu as Palavesham

== Production ==
Paasam Oru Vesham is based on the novel Sotthupattalam. S. Samuthiram, who wrote the novel, wrote the film adaptation's dialogues, while the director Jayadevi wrote the screenplay. Filming was completed in five days.

== Soundtrack ==
The music was composed by Shyam, with lyrics by Vairamuthu.

Track listing
| No. | Title | Length |

== Critical reception ==
The Indian Express wrote that Thyagu "has the makings of a good comedian. Samuthiram's dialogues sometimes acquire a cutting edge. The camera work lacks lustre: the perils of indiscriminate available light photography".
