= Parallel College (film) =

- Directed by: Thulasidas
- Written by: Thulasidas; Mohan Kumar; K.P. Jinachandran
- Starring: Suresh Gopi; Geetha; Mukesh; Maathu
- Cinematography: Sekhar V. Joseph
- Edited by: G. Murali
- Music by: Kannur Rajan; Mohan Sitara
- Release date: 1991
- Country: India
- Language: Malayalam

Parallel College is a 1991 Malayalam film directed by Thulasidas. It stars Suresh Gopi as a new teacher in a parallel college with a troubled past, while Mukesh plays an extended cameo. Geetha and Maathu plays lead female roles.

== Plot ==
The film is set in a dysfunctional parallel college in rural Kerala called Sanathana College named after Sanathanana Pillai, a manual buffalo milker turned principal. He fails to keep discipline, collect fee dues and pay salaries to staff. Rasheed, the attender openly sell hand made cigarettes to the students. Rasheed also part times as a marriage broker during college hours. The teachers are constantly demanding the salary dues. Sanathanan Pillai also owes money to Dubai returned financier, Chandrasekharan Nair who tries to flirt with the lady teachers and girl students.

Hameed, a student, bullies and harasses both teachers and students. He tries to woo beautiful Indu which leads him to clash with another student Ashokan. Teachers fails to control the fight and the teashop owner Rahael uses her broom to defuse the situation. Parents get together and complains to the principal to improve the discipline of college and quality of teaching. Rasheed arranges for a new teacher to teach accountancy.

Ananthan joins as the accountancy lecturer. He is a tough person and clashes with Hameed on the first day itself. Local goons intervenes on behalf of Hameed, but Ananthan beats them off. The school's discipline improves and more students join the college. He also helps financially backward student, Radha to pay fees. Chandrasekharan Nair tries to take advantage of Radha's situation tempting her mother with gifts.

On a flashback, it is revealed that Ananthan was in love with Sudha. However, he teases Sudha constantly on her lack of education. Sudha commits suicide in a misunderstanding. Ananthan is still struggling from the guilt of the tragic death of his fiancée. He is trying to find solace in his work and alcohol.

Chandrasekharan Nair manages to seduce Indu with marriage proposal and gifts. He also tries to woo Sreedevi Indu's elder sister. But she rejects his advances. The struggling family consists of their drunkard brother Vikraman and retired father. Chandrasekharan recruits Vikraman as his henchman.

Ananthan starts living in a rented house with domestic helper Vasu. Rahael also start living with them as a housekeeper. Ananthan meets Sreedevi who were classmates in college. Rasheed talks to Sreedevi's dad about an arranged marriage between Ananthan and Sreedevi.She remembers her past in which dynamic Balu steals her heart. They gets married in a simple ceremony, but Balu gets murdered on the first night by his revolutionary colleagues who wants to bomb a train. Sreedevi rejects the proposal.

Radha gets pregnant with Chandrasekharan Nair's child, but he simply rejects to acknowledge his responsibility. Radha is found dead hanging from the ceiling. Chandrasekharan spreads rumors that Ananthan is responsible for the suicide. An angry mob led by Chandrasekharan and Vikraman attacks the parallel college. Ananthan along with Rasheed and Ashokan flights off the mob, but the college gets destroyed. Rasheed returns to selling lottery tickets while Sanathanan Pillai becomes a door to door chicken seller.

Chandrasekharan manipulates Vikraman to arrange his wedding with Indu to which her father gladly agrees. Indu and Sreedevi furiously disagrees to the wedding, though the family proceeds with the proposal. On the eve of the wedding, Radha's mother reveals to Sreedevi that it was Chandrasekharan who was behind her suicide. Overhearing this, Ananthan confronts Chandrasekharan and in the ensuing fight murders him. The film ends with Ananthan taken by Police.

== Cast ==
- Suresh Gopi as Ananthan
- Geetha as Sreedevi
- Maathu as Indu
- Vijayaraghavan as Chandrashekharan Nair a.k.a. Sekharan
- Pappu as Sanathan Pillai (Principal)
- Mukesh as Balu
- Mamukkoya as Rasheed
- K. B. Ganesh Kumar as Vikraman
- Karamana Janardanan Nair
- Mahesh as Ashokan
- Philomina as Rahelamma
- Oduvil Unnikrishnan as Karunakaran
- Jagadish as Vasu
- Santhakumari as Bhargavi
- Chithra as Sudha
- Sabitha Anand as Radha
- Baiju as Hameed
