= Gandhinagar 2nd Street =

- Theatrical release poster
- Directed by: Sathyan Anthikad
- Screenplay by: Sreenivasan
- Story by: Sathyan Anthikad
- Produced by: Kochumon; Mohanlal; I. V. Sasi; Seema; Mammootty
- Starring: Mohanlal; Karthika; Mammootty; Seema; Sreenivasan; Thilakan
- Cinematography: Vipin Mohan
- Edited by: K. Narayanan
- Music by: Shyam
- Production company: Casino Films
- Distributed by: Century Films
- Release date: 4 July 1986
- Running time: 150 minutes
- Country: India
- Language: Malayalam

Gandhinagar 2nd Street is a 1986 Indian Malayalam-language comedy drama film directed by Sathyan Anthikad and written by Sreenivasan from a story by Anthikad. It stars Mohanlal in the lead role, with Karthika, Seema, Sreenivasan, Thilakan, Innocent, Sukumari and K. P. A. C. Lalitha in supporting roles. The film also has Mammootty in a Cameo appearance. The music was composed by Shyam. The film was remade in Telugu as Gandhinagar Rendava Veedhi (1987) and in Tamil as Annanagar Mudhal Theru (1988).

== Plot ==
Madhavan is trying to get a job for his unemployed friend Sethu. When a spate of robberies takes place in a middle-class neighbourhood, Madhavan has Sethu pose as Ram Singh, a Nepali émigré, to fulfil the residents' need for a Gorkha security guard. He befriends Nirmala, a preschool teacher. Meanwhile, a police officer and his daughter, Maya, move into the neighbourhood, bringing back memories from the past for Sethu.

Three years before, Sethu and Maya were friends and later they fell in love with each other. But, they separated due to some misunderstandings. Sethu apologies to Maya, but Maya does not reciprocate. Nirmala also finds the real identity of Sethu and his relationship with Maya. Tomy, a neighbour, misbehaves with Maya and Sethu beats him.

The colony's residents turns against Ram Singh after the incident and suspects that Nirmala has an affair with him. Nirmala's husband Balachandran returns from Dubai and the colony's residents gossip about the relationship between Sethu and Nirmala. Balachandran dismisses the rumors as false and says that he trusts his wife and that his wife has send letters about Sethu. Balachandran visit Maya's father and learns that she is actually a widow. Balachandran has also arranged a job for Sethu abroad and when he is returning he will also take Sethu to Dubai. The movie ends with Maya and Sethu uniting.

== Cast ==
- Mohanlal as Sethu / Ram Singh
- Karthika as Maya. Sethu's ex-girlfriend later girlfriend
- Seema as Nirmala, the nursery school teacher and Balachandran's wife
- Sreenivasan as Madhavan, Sethu's friend
- Thilakan as Maya's father, a brash policeman
- Sukumari as Mrs. Varkey, Colony Secretary and Tomy's mother
- C. I. Paul as Varkey. Tomy's brash father
- K. P. A. C. Lalitha as Bharathi
- Sankaradi as Kuttichan
- Innocent as Azeez, Police Constable
- Santhakumari as Madhavan's mother
- Janardhanan
- Ashokan as Tomy, a flirtatious young man who likes to woo girls he meets.
- Mamukkoya
- Augustine
- Mammootty as Balachandran, Nirmala's husband (Cameo appearance)
- Neena Kurup

== Soundtrack ==
The music was composed by Shyam and the lyrics were written by Bichu Thirumala.

No.	Song	Singers	Lyrics	Length
1	"Ormayil Oru Sisiram"	Unni Menon	Bichu Thirumala	
2	"Thudarkkinaakkalil"	K. J. Yesudas, K. S. Chithra	Bichu Thirumala	

== Remakes ==
The film was remade in Telugu as Gandhinagar Rendava Veedhi (1987) directed by P. N. Ramachandra Rao and starring Rajendra Prasad, and in Tamil as Annanagar Mudhal Theru (1988) directed by Balu Anand and starring Sathyaraj.
