= The News (film) =

- Poster
- Directed by: Shaji Kailas
- Written by: Shaji Kailas; Jagadish
- Produced by: G.R.Sureshkumar for GR Movie Arts
- Starring: Suresh Gopi; Lizy; Ranjini; Jagadish; Jagathi Sreekumar
- Cinematography: Anandakuttan
- Edited by: K. Sankunny
- Music by: Rajamani
- Release date: 2 June 1989
- Country: India
- Language: Malayalam

The News is a 1989 Indian Malayalam-language Neo-noir mystery crime thriller film written by Jagadish and directed by Shaji Kailas in his directorial debut, and produced by G.R.Sureshkumar, starring Suresh Gopi, Ranjini, Lizy and Babu Antony.

== Plot ==
After getting turned down in his application to become an Inspector, Rishi Menon starts his own detective agency, where he is handed an assignment to investigate the murder of a woman named Jolly and the disappearance of a college student named Roy. Arun, Roy and Albert are Megha's juniors in college and known to Rishi since Rishi and Megha are in a relationship and soon to be engaged. Arun's father Viswanathan is the MP from ruling party and a straightforward man who does not allow his son to take advantage of his position.

However, Viswanathan's arch rival MLA George Thomas tries all trick-in-a-book to bring down Viswanathan, even going to the extent of harassing Arun and his friends with the help of his corrupt police officer friend CI Freddy. One night, Albert hears some noises coming from above the house and gets scared, he comes down to alert his friends. Roy goes up to the terrace to check, but does not return. His friends start searching for him everywhere thinking he's pulling a prank on them and even go outside to their usual haunts to check, but without any success.

In the morning shortly after they are back, the maid finds blood coming from their tap. On checking further in the terrace they find a corpse of a girl. Arun and his friends are arrested, where George Thomas and Freddy capitalize on the situation, alleging that Roy and his friends including Arun murdered the women and dumped her body in the tank, and Roy is in hiding. At this point, Vishanathan hands over the case to Rishi's detective agency. Rishi finds out that the murdered girl Jolly and Roy were in a relationship. When he investigates further from her hostel, he finds out from her friends that Jolly had a troubled childhood since her father abandoned her mother when she was pregnant with her, resulting in both of them living a hard life.

Jolly starts hating men and to take out her frustration starts pretending to be in love with men only to ditch them afterwards. Roy was her latest victim as per her friends, but Rishi also finds out that eventually she falls for a sportsman named Victor George. Based on Jolly's phone conversion log from the hostel, he traces Victors residence to a lodge in the city. Once he confronts Victor, he tries to escape, only to be overpowered by Rishi. Rishi also finds out Roy to be hidden in a house in the city itself, based on the call details when Roy had once tried to phone his friends while in captivity.

In his final meeting with Viswanathan, Rishi reveals that the actual killer is Viswanathan's PA Jeevan. Victor George was an ambitious sportsman who wanted to be appointed as the coach of the Olympic team. At the same time he was not interested in marrying Jolly whom he had impregnated during one of their secret encounters. He traps Jolly and takes her to meet Jeevan and friends under the pretext of a friends party where Jeevan and his friends assault Jolly one after the other. While in her senses, Jolly comes to the roof and tries to stab Victor who cheated her.

In the scuffle, Jeevan accidentally stabs and kills Jolly. It was on hearing this scuffle that Albert alerted his friends and Roy went up to check. Roy witnesses the murder of Jolly at the neighboring terrace. When he tries to escape, Victor sees him and Roy is taken captive and they dump the body in the tank so that the case gets deviated. Jeevan and gang gets arrested and Rishi solves his first successful case as a private detective.

== Cast ==
- Suresh Gopi as Rishi Menon
- Madhu as Surendran Menon
- Janardhanan as Radhakrishnan
- Jagathi Sreekumar as Karim
- Jagadish as Chandu
- Sreenath as Jeevan
- Babu Antony as Victor George
- Vijayaraghavan as C.I Freddy Issac
- Innocent as Bhargavan Pillai
- Mammukoya as Paramasivam
- K.P.A.C. Sunny as George Thomas
- Prathapachandran as Viswanathan
- Kollam Thulasi as Doctor Rajendran
- James as Lodge Manager
- Sukumari as Sulochana
- Ranjini as Megha
- Lizy as Jolly
- Baiju as Arun
- Mahesh as Roy Jacob
- Idavela Babu as Albert
- Appa Haja as Venu

== Box office ==
The News was a landmark in Suresh Gopi's career and was one of his first commercially successful films which established him as the lead actor.
