= Kamal Roy =

Indian actor

- Occupation: Actor
- Years active: 1979–1999
- Relatives: Urvashi (sister); Kalpana (sister); Kalaranjini (sister); Prince (brother)

Kamal Roy (died 21 January 2026) was an Indian actor in Malayalam cinema and in television serials. He portrayed a child actor in Sayoojyam. His best known role was playing the villain in Kalyanasougandhikam directed by Vinayan. He came from a family of prominent performing artists.

== Personal life and death ==
For a time, Roy was married to the actress Rekha Ratheesh. He was in a coma for 6 months after being beaten with an iron rod. He died of cardiac failure.

== Filmography ==
- Sayoojyam (1979)
- Kolilakkam (1981)
- Manju (1983)
- Yuvajanolsavam (1986)
- Kingini (1992)
- Kalyana Sougandhikam (1996)
- Shobhanam (1997)
- Vachalam (1997)
- Anthapuram (1999)
