= Rajavazhcha =

- Directed by: Sasikumar
- Written by: S. L. Puram Sadanandan
- Produced by: Maruthi Pictures
- Starring: Suresh Gopi; Sai Kumar; Thilakan; Chitra; Ranjini
- Cinematography: J. Williams
- Music by: Johnson
- Release date: 1990
- Country: India
- Language: Malayalam

Rajavazhcha is a 1990 Malayalam film by Sasikumar starring Suresh Gopi, Sai Kumar, Thilakan, Ranjini and Chithra.

== Plot ==
Govindankutty and Vijayaraghavan are brothers, the former struggling to complete the studies of the latter younger sibling. Govindankutty and Kuttan Nair work for daily wages under the wealthy and unscrupulous Madhava Panikkar to make ends meet. When Vijayaraghavan passes his graduate exam, Govindankutty and Kuttan Nair go to request Panikkar his help in further educating him, but Panikkar turns them down and humiliates them. However, Kuttan Nair pledges his property, and his daughter Amminikutty sells her ornaments to help Vijayaraghavan start his course. Amminikutty secretly loves Vijayaraghavan and Govindankutty and Kuttan Nair decides to get both married once he gets a job. Kuttan Nair's nephew Karadi Vasu is an ex-convict to wants to marry Amminikutty, but Kuttan Nair rejects his proposal, and he is roughened up by Govindankutty when they get into an argument about the same.

Vijayaraghavan successfully completes his post-graduation course and appears for IPS exam at the advice of their well-wisher Kaimal. He passes the exam and gets popular around his circles for the same. Panikkar who is secretly running a counterfeit currency operation decides to capitalize on this situation. Even if Vijayaraghavan's mother Naniyamma used to be a maid in their house, he organizes an appreciation event for Vijayaraghavan and announces there that he is going to get him married to his daughter Mini. Govindankutty is furious on hearing this as Panikkar had initially refused to help them with money and he and Kuttan Nair had decided the marriage between Amminikutty and Vijayaraghavan, However Vijayaraghavan reveals that Mini had been secretly helping him with money since he joined for post-graduation to finish his course, and both fell in love in the course. He decides to marry mini which creates a rift between the brothers. On the same day of their marriage, Govindankutty marries Amminikutty to honor his promise to Kuttan Nair. Post wedding, Panikkar uses his influence to get Vijayaraghavan posted in their area itself, but he turns out to be an upright officer who refuses to use his power to help Panikkar for unfair means.

Naniyamma’ s presence in their home starts to irk him and his wife. One night he sneaks into Naniyamma’ s bedroom and his wife turn up at the same time to accuse Naniyamma of having an affair with Panikkar. Shocked at the event, Naniyamma returns to her own home without talking about the issue to her son and daughter in law to avoid any embarrassment. Due to the severe shock, she gets bedridden and is shifted to the hospital by Vijayaraghavan. She passes away eventually and Govindankutty is not able to get to the cremation on time since Panikkar had avoided passing the information to him who was away on his work. He turns up at Panikkar's compound where Naniyamma is being cremated and starts a fight with him. Eventually Karadi vasu stabs and kills a pregnant Amminikutty who jumps in between to save Govindankutty. Kuttan Nair reveals now that Govindankutty and Vijayaraghavan's father who was Panikkar's employee was murdered by him when he found out about his counterfeit business. Vijayaraghavan arrests Panicker and Govindankutty rows away with his wife's corpse.

== Cast ==
- Suresh Gopi as Govindankutty
- Sai Kumar as Vijayaraghavan (Younger brother of Govindankuttty)
- Thilakan as Madhava Panikkar (father of Mini)
- Chithra as Amminikutty (Wife of Govindankutty)
- Ranjini as Mini (Wife of Vijayaraghvan)
- M. G. Soman as Kuttan Nair
- Kaviyoor Ponnamma as Naniyamma (Mother of Govindankutty and Vijayaraghavan)
- Sukumari as Meenakshi (Mother of Mini)
- Sankaradi as Kaimal
- Innocent as Ittoopp
- Jagathy Sreekumar as Mathai
- Mohan Raj as Karadi Vasu
- Mammukoya as Mohammadkutty
- Priya as Aleykutty

== Soundtrack ==
The music was composed by Johnson and the lyrics were written by Poovachal Khader.

No.	Song	Singers	Lyrics	Length (m:ss)
1	"Etho Kaikal Maaykkunnu"	P. Jayachandran	Poovachal Khader	
2	"Mele Mekhangal"	K. S. Chithra, M. G. Sreekumar	Poovachal Khader	
3	"Vanchippaattolam Thullum"	M. G. Sreekumar, Chorus	Poovachal Khader	
