= Subhavaartha =

1998 Indian Telugu-language film directed by P. N. Ramachandra Rao

- Title card
- Directed by: P. N. Ramachandra Rao
- Written by: P. N. Ramachandra Rao; Liaquat Ali Khan (Tamil dialogues)
- Produced by: M. Y. Maharshi (Telugu); Kalaipuli S. Thanu (Tamil)
- Starring: Arjun; Soundarya
- Music by: Koti
- Production company: M. Y. M. Creations (Telugu); Kalaipuli International (Tamil)
- Release dates: 8 October 1998 (Telugu); 15 January 1999 (Tamil)
- Country: India
- Languages: Telugu; Tamil

Subhavaartha (transl. Good news) is a 1998 Indian Telugu-language drama film directed by P. N. Ramachandra Rao, starring Arjun and Soundarya. The film was partially reshot in Tamil as Mannavaru Chinnavaru (transl. The younger one is a king) with Sivaji Ganesan replacing Kota Srinivasa Rao as well as different cast. The Tamil version, produced by Kalaipuli S. Thanu, was released in 1999.

== Cast ==
Cast (Telugu)	Cast (Tamil)	Role (Telugu)	Role (Tamil)
Arjun Sarja		Rajendra Prasad "Raja"	Rajendra Prasad "Raja"
Soundarya		Meghana	Meghana
Kota Srinivasa Rao	Sivaji Ganesan	Srinivasa Rao	Rajashekar
Kavya	Maheswari	Shweta Setty	Shweta Setty
Chandra Mohan	Visu	Chandrashekhar	Shanmugasundaram
Siva Parvathi	K. R. Vijaya	Chandrashekhar's wife	Shanmugasundaram's wife
Srihari		Siddaraju	Siddaraju
Narra Venkateswara Rao		Dharmaraju	Dharmaraju

Telugu version

- Velu
- Brahmanandam
- M. S. Narayana
- Gundu Hanumantha Rao
- Master Aditya Paruchuri
- Master Surya Paruchuri
- Master Venkatesh Battula
- Master Phanindra Pagidi
- Master Manideep Lingala

Tamil version

- R. Sundarrajan as Minor Rajamani
- S. S. Chandran as Sigaram
- Anu Mohan as Rajamani's cousin
- Idichapuli Selvaraj as Village man

== Soundtrack ==
The songs were composed by Koti. All lyrics were written by Sirivennela Seetharama Sastry. The Tamil soundtrack is credited to composer Geethapriyan, who reused the original songs.

Telugu
No.	Title	Singer(s)	Length
1.	"Are Bapre"	S. P. Balasubrahmanyam, K. S. Chithra
2.	"Atcha Maina"	S. P. Balasubrahmanyam, K. S. Chithra
3.	"Jaabilamma" (duet)	S. P. Balasubrahmanyam, K. S. Chithra
4.	"Kulluku Baby"	S. P. Balasubrahmanyam, K. S. Chithra
5.	"Jaabilamma" (sad)	S. P. Balasubrahmanyam

Tamil
No.	Title	Singer(s)	Length
1.	"Adi Paaduthe"	S. P. Balasubrahmanyam
2.	"Kathi Vaitha"	Sukhwinder Singh, Ranjani
3.	"Konji Pesu"	Hariharan, Sadhana Sargam
4.	"Vaannilave"	Mano, Ranjani
5.	"Mannavaru"	Krishnaraj, Ranjani

== Reception ==
A critic from Zamin Ryot wrote that the director should be congratulated for not showing any vulgar and unwanted scenes in this family story film which has a natural flow of good drama. Reviewing the Tamil version, a critic from The New Indian Express noted "though thespian Sivaji Ganesan and Soundarya shoulder the film, it is too late for the director to realise his mistakes. If some of the stunt and murder scenes are any indication, it seems the director has no basic knowledge about law and order". A critic from The Hindu wrote that "Both Soundarya and Arjun simply mouth the fast paced dialogues, their expressions not doing full justice to the content".
