= Chitram! Bhalare Vichitram!! =

1991 film by P. N. Ramachandra Rao

- VCD cover
- Directed by: P. N. Ramachandra Rao
- Screenplay by: P. N. Ramachandra Rao
- Dialogue by: Thotapalli Madhu
- Story by: P. Sambasiva Rao (Telugu adaptation)
- Based on: Sailesh Dey's Bengali play Joymakali Boarding
- Produced by: R. V. Vijay Kumar
- Starring: Naresh; Rajeevi; Subhalekha Sudhakar; Tulasi; Brahmanandam; Bindu Ghosh; Maharshi Raghava; Jaya Latha; Kota Srinivasa Rao
- Cinematography: Babjee
- Edited by: B. Shankar; S. Ramesh
- Music by: Vidyasagar
- Distributed by: Sri Sairam Films
- Release date: 7 June 1991
- Country: India
- Language: Telugu

Chitram! Bhalare Vichitram!! (transl. Picture! Bravo Strange!!) a 1991 Indian Telugu-language comedy film directed by P. N. Ramachandra Rao. The film features an ensemble cast including Naresh, Rajeevi, Subhalekha Sudhakar, Tulasi, Brahmanandam, and Maharshi Raghava. The film marked the first lead role for Rajeevi.

The film follows four bachelors who disguise themselves as a family to secure a rental home, leading to comedic situations when one of them falls in love with the landlady's daughter. Chitram Bhalare Vichitram is a Telugu adaptation of Sailesh Dey's Bengali play Joymakali Boarding.

The film received positive reviews and was successful at the box office, eventually developing a cult following. Brahmanandam later listed Chitram Bhalare Vichitram among the top 11 films of his career. Naresh won the Nandi Special Jury Award for his performance. The film was later remade into Kannada as Bombat Hendthi (1992) and Tamil as Aanazhagan (1995).

== Plot ==
The film follows four bachelors—Raja, Sudhakar, Raghava, and Brahmanandam—who live in a rented house owned by Gorojanala Garudachalam. One night, after returning home drunk, they misbehave with Garudachalam in a drunken state. The next morning, Garudachalam evicts them from the house. Struggling to find a new place, the four young men face rejection from several landlords who refuse to rent to bachelors.

They eventually find a landlady who insists on renting her property only to families. In a bid to secure the rental, the four bachelors disguise themselves as a family: Sudhakar plays the father, and Raja pretends to be the wife, "Prema". Raghava plays Sudhakar's disabled brother, and Brahmanandam an elder uncle of the family. Complications arise when Raja's girlfriend, who is the landlady's daughter, becomes involved, leading to a series of comedic mishaps.

Brahmanandam plays the elder uncle / grandfather-figure of the family (often referred to in the film's synopsis simply as an older "father" or "uncle" figure to complete the multi-generational household)

== Cast ==
- Naresh as Nimmagadda Rajeswara Rao "Raja" / Prema
- Rajeevi as Swapna
- Subhalekha Sudhakar as Sudhakar
- Tulasi as Meera
- Brahmanandam as Brahmanadam
- Bindu Ghosh as Gajalakshmi
- Maharshi Raghava as Raghava
- Jaya Latha
- Kota Srinivasa Rao as Gorojanala Garudachalam
- Jaya Prakash Reddy as Phani
- Attlii Lakshmi as Annapurnamma
- Chitti Babu as Swapna's servant
- Raavi Kondala Rao as Raghava's uncle Kolaiayappa
- Radha Kumari as Raja's grandmother
- Pradeep Shakthi as Inspector
- Giribabu as Raja's boss
- Shiva Shanker Master as Dance Master in Drama song
- M. S. Rayudu
- Sudhakar Reddy
- Shyam Babu
- Vijji

== Music ==
Vidyasagar, a relatively newcomer at the time, composed the music for Chitram! Bhalare Vichitram!!, with notable tracks including "Seetalu Yerugani" and "Maddela Daruvei." The former, a melodious song sung by Sailaja and Chitra, was featured during Prema's Seemantam ceremony in the film. It has remained popular and is still commonly played at Seemantam functions in Hyderabad. The tune for "Seetalu Yerugani" is adapted from the Marathi song "Ga Kuneetari Yenaar Yenaar Ga" from Ashi Hi Banwa Banwi (1988), which was also shot during a Godh-barai ceremony, with the melody customised to suit Telugu and South Indian tastes.

No.	Title	Lyrics	Singer(s)	Length
1.	"Brahmachaarulam"	Veturi	S. P. Balasubrahmanyam	3:53
2.	"Navvukune Mana"	Veturi	S. P. Balasubrahmanyam, K.S. Chitra	4:32
3.	"Mahasaya Mathuga"	Veturi	S. P. Balasubrahmanyam, S.P. Sailaja	4:17
4.	"Maddela Daruvei"	Veturi	S. P. Balasubrahmanyam	3:49
5.	"Seetalu Yerugani"	Veturi	S.P. Sailaja, K. S. Chitra	5:02
Total length:				21:33

== Legacy ==
Comedian Brahmanadam's phrase "Nee Yenkamma" became popular with this film. Brahmanandam later listed Chitram! Bhalare Vichitram!! among the top 11 films of his career.

== Accolades ==
Nandi Awards

- Nandi Special Jury Award (actor) – Naresh (1991)
