= Mamukkoya =

Indian comedian and actor (1946–2023)

- മാമുക്കോയ
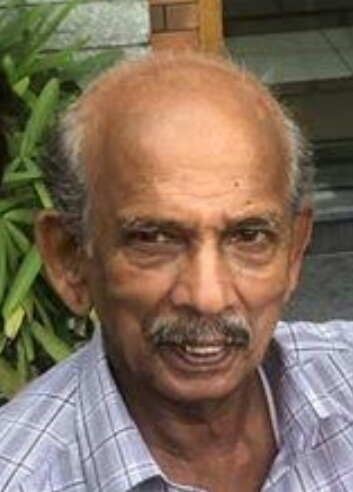
- Born: 5 July 1946; Calicut, Malabar District, Madras Presidency, British India (present day Kozhikode, Kerala, India)
- Died: 26 April 2023 (aged 76); Kozhikode, Kerala, India
- Other name: Mamukka
- Occupations: Actor; comedian
- Years active: 1979–2023
- Spouse: Suhara
- Children: 4

Mamukkoya (5 July 1946 – 26 April 2023) was an Indian actor known for his work predominantly in Malayalam cinema. He mostly appeared in comedic roles. His unique usage of Kozhikode dialect and style marked his presence in the industry. In a career spanning over four decades, Mamukkoya acted in more than 450 Malayalam films and was the first winner of the State award for best comedian in Malayalam cinema.

== Early life ==
Mamukkoya was born to Chalikandiyil Muhammed and Imbachi Ayisha on 5 July 1946 in Kozhikode, Kerala. He had an elder brother Koyakutty. He had his primary education from MM High School, Calicut. Mamukkoya began working at a timber yard in Kallayi after completing his education at Pallikandi Elementary School, Kuttichira Higher Secondary School, and Kozhikode MM School. He participated in theatrical productions when he was in school. Later, he began performing in a number of amateur plays. He would perform in plays at night and work in the timber yard during the day.

== Career ==
Mamukkoya started his career as a theatre actor. He got his chance in the film industry through Anyarude Bhoomi (1979). His second entry to Malayalam cinema was through S. Konnanatt's Surumaitta Kannukal. He was recommended by Vaikom Muhammad Basheer for the role in the movie. After this film, he was introduced to Sathyan Anthikkad by scriptwriter and actor Sreenivasan. Mamukkoya appeared in Siby Malayil's Doore Doore Oru Koodu Koottam, written by Sreenivasan. In the film, he played an Arabic teacher. Initially, the character only appeared in two or three scenes. However, Mamukkoya's performance impressed the director and writer who added further scenes for his role. Mamukkoya would later say that after this movie he stopped going to the timber yard or appearing in plays. He then landed a role in Gandhinagar Second Street, which was also written by Sreenivasan. This was one of his first notable roles. Then came Sathyan Anthikkad's Sanmanassullavarkku Samadhanam' and 'Rareeram' by Siby Malayil. His portrayal of Gafoor in Sathyan Anthikkad's Mohanlal – Sreenivasan starring Nadodikkattu (1987) carved a niche for him in Malayalam cinema. The character Gafoor now enjoys a cult following in Kerala. An animation series was released based on this character after several years. His award-winning performance in Perumazhakkalam (2004) proved that he can handle non-comedy roles as well with ease. He again did a similar role in Byari, which won the National Film Award for Best Feature Film. He did the title role in the film Korappan, the great (2001), which depicted him as a forest brigand like Veerappan. In 2004, he received a Special Mention in the Kerala State Film Award for the movie Perumazhakkalam. Mamukkoya's roles in Ramjirao Speaking, Thalayana Manthram, Shubhayatra, Irupatham Noottandu, Sreedharante Onnam Thirumurivu, Ponmuttayidunna Thaaravu, Pattanapravesham and Dhwani are considered among the best of his career.

== Personal life and death ==
Mamukkoya was married to Suhara. The couple had four children; Muhammed Nisar, Shahitha, Nadiya and Abdul Rasheed. He was residing in Kozhikode near Beypore. Mamukkoya had a very close friendship with Vaikom Muhammad Basheer, S. K. Pottekkatt and M. S. Baburaj.

On 24 April 2023, while inaugurating a sevens football tournament in Kalikavu, Malappuram, Kerala, Mamukkoya suffered cardiac arrest and a brain hemorrhage. He died at a private hospital in Kozhikode on 26 April 2023, aged 76.

== Awards ==
Award	Year	Category	Film(s)	Result	Ref
Kerala State Film Award	2004	Special Jury Mention	Perumazhakkalam	Won	
Kerala State Film Award	2008	Best Comedian	Innathe Chintha Vishayam	Won	
Kerala Film Critics Association Awards	2004	Second Best Actor	Perumazhakkalam	Won	
Kerala Film Critics Association Awards	2020	Chalachitra Prathibha Award	Various Films	Won	
Asiavision Awards	2012	Best Supporting Actor	Molly Aunty Rocks! Vellaripravinte Changathi	Won	
Jaihind TV Awards	2008	Best Comedy Artist	Innathe Chintha Vishayam	Won	
Jaihind TV Awards	2009	Kala Ratnam Award	Various Films	Won	

== Filmography ==
=== Malayalam ===
==== 1970s ====
Year	Title	Role	Notes
1979	Anyarude Bhoomi		

==== 1980s ====
Year	Title	Role	Notes
1983	Surumaitta Kannukal		
1986	Snehamulla Simham		
1986	Gandhinagar 2nd Street		
1986	Ennu Nathante Nimmi	Fakrudeen	
1986	Sanmanassullavarkku Samadhanam	Mamu/Ummer	
1986	Doore Doore Oru Koodu Koottam	Koya	
1986	Rareeram	Rickshaw Driver	
1987	Sreedharante Onnam Thirumurivu	Narayanan	
1987	Athinumappuram		
1987	Kalam Mari Katha Mari	Pareedu	
1987	Naalkavala	H.C. Koya	
1987	Unnikale Oru Kadha Parayam		
1987	Irupatham Noottandu	Koya	
1987	Nadodikkattu	Gafoorka	
1987	Adimakal Udamakal	Pokker	
1987	Agni Muhurtham		
1988	August 1	Abubakker	
1988	Dhwani	Mamu	
1988	Oohakachavadam	Abdullah	
1988	Pattanapravesham	Gafoorka	
1988	Ponmuttayidunna Tharavu	Abubacker	
1989	Artham	Kunjikannan	
1989	Vachanam	Farm Worker	
1989	Vadakkunokkiyantram	Photographer	
1989	Annakutty Kodambakkam Vilikkunnu	Koya	
1989	Swagatham		
1989	Anagha		
1989	Pandu Pandoru Desathu		
1989	Kireedam	Constable Hameed- Najeeb's father	
1989	Mazhavilkavadi	Kunji Khadir	
1989	The News	Paramasivam	
1989	Pradeshika Varthakal	Jabbar	
1989	Peruvannapurathe Visheshangal	P. C. Peruvannapuram	
1989	Ramji Rao Speaking	Hamsakoya	
1989	Njangalude Kochu Doctor	Basheer, Attender in Kalapurackal Hospital	
1989	Varnatheru	Appunni	
1989	Pooram		
1989	Aattinakkare	Naanu Nair	
1989	Jeevitham Oru Raagam	Sankaran	
1989	Nerunnu Nanmakal	Appunni	
1989	Varavelpu	Hamsa	
1989	Mudra	Mamu	
1989	Nair Saab	Chef Koya	
1989	Varnam	Mamukkoya	

==== 1990s ====
Year	Title	Role	Notes
1990	Anantha Vruthantham	Thanoor Thaha	
1990	Cheriya Lokavum Valiya Manushyarum	Abu	
1990	Superstar	Khader/Lambodharan Pillai	
1990	Paadaatha Veenayum Paadum		
1990	May Dinam		
1990	Kuruppinte Kanakku Pustakom		
1990	Vidhyarambham	Venkiteshan	
1990	Pavam Pavam Rajakumaran	Sankarettan	
1990	Ponnaranjanam	Ummukoya	
1990	Enquiry		
1990	Vachanam		
1990	Champion Thomas		
1990	Shubhayathra	Kareem Bhai	
1990	Pavakkoothu	Kanjarakutti	
1990	Kalikkalam	Unni Nair	
1990	Gajakesariyogam	Raghavan Nair	
1990	Dr. Pasupathy	Velayudhan Kutty	
1990	His Highness Abdullah	Jamal	
1990	Kouthuka Varthakal	Ahmad Kutty	
1990	Nagarangalil Chennu Raparkam	'Cheriya' Raman Nair	
1990	Malayogom		
1990	Purappadu		
1990	Anandanum Appukuttanum Aanayundu		
1990	Orukkam	Paramu	
1990	Rajavazhcha	Mohammadkutty	
1990	Randam Varavu	Damu	
1990	Nanma Niranjavan Sreenivasan		
1990	Saandram	Abdu/Abdullah	
1990	Sasneham	Appukuttan	
1990	Thalayana Manthram	Kunjananthan Mesthiri	
1990	Thoovalsparsham	Moosaka	
1991	Souhrudam		
1991	Daiva Sahayam Lucky Centre	Usmanikka	
1991	Sundhari Kakka	Sulaiman	
1991	Kanalkkattu	Moideen	
1991	Kakkathollayiram	Akbar	
1991	Aakasha Kottayile Sultan	Cletus	
1991	Chanchattam	Hotel Attendant	
1991	Kalari		
1991	Khandakaavyam		
1991	Georgukutty C/O Georgukutty		
1991	Apoorvam Chilar	Rajan	
1991	Cheppu Kilukkunna Changathi	Khader	
1991	Innathe Program	Moosa	
1991	Kadinjool Kalyanam	Imbichi Koya	
1991	Ennum Nanmakal	Khader	
1991	Oru Tharam Randu Tharam Moonu Tharam	Mammu	
1991	Onnaam Muhurtham	Sulaiman	
1991	Amina Tailors	Malappuram Moideen/Bapputty	
1991	Postbox No 27		
1991	Santhwanam	Kareem bhai	
1991	Kankettu	Keeleri Achu	
1991	Parallel College (film)	Rasheed	
1991	Sandhesam	K.G. Pothuwal	
1991	Venal Kinavukal	Ramu	
1992	Ponnurukkum Pakshi	Vaidyar	
1992	Aayushkalam	Varghese	
1992	Aadhaaram	Kunjappu	
1992	Congratulations Miss Anitha Menon		
1992	Valayam		
1992	Apaaratha	Jamal	
1992	Vasudha	Jamal	
1992	Rishi		
1992	Kallanum Policum	P. C. Abdulla /Abdukka	
1992	Kamaladalam	Kala Mandiram Hydrose	
1992	Savidham	Balakrishnan	
1992	Ente Ponnu Thampuran	Mammotty Master	
1992	Ayalathe Adheham	Kuttappan	
1992	Grihaprevesam	Raman Nair	
1992	Makkal Mahatmyam	Andru, school peon	
1992	Police Diary		
1992	Kaazhchakkappuram	Uthkandan Pillai	
1992	Kingini	Kuttappan	
1992	Ellarum Chollanu	Adimakkannu	
1992	Ezhara Ponnana	Aimutty Koya	
1992	Maanyanmar	Athapaadi Anthru	
1992	My Dear Muthachan	Punnoose	
1992	Oru Kochu Bhoomikulukkam	Thankappan	
1992	Poochakkaru Mani Kettum	Drama Artist	
1992	Utsavamelam	Nair	
1993	Aagneyam	Mukkathu Moosa	
1993	Ammayane Sathyam	Mujeeb Rahman	
1993	Ghoshayaathra	Kuttymoosa Sahib	
1993	Samooham	Karyasthan	
1993	Kalippattam	Ismail, Venu's friend	
1993	Bhaagyavaan	Unni Kuruppu	
1993	Pravachakan	Jaffer Sherif	
1993	Golanthara Vartha	Kuruppu	
1993	Ente Sreekuttikku	Kunju	
1993	Varam		
1993	O' Faby	Teashop Owner	
1993	Narayam		
1993	Addeham Enna Iddeham	Saidali	
1993	Vakkeel Vasudev	SI Jabbar	
1993	Ponnuchami		
1993	Bandhukkal Sathrukkal	Hamsa	
1993	Kavadiyattam	Koya	
1993	Janam	Koyakutty Sahib	
1993	Chenkol	Police Constable Hameed	
1993	Kulapathy		
1993	Ghazal	Mollakka	
1993	Sthalathe Pradhana Payyans	Kumaran	
1994	Bheesmacharya	P.K. Arogyaswami	
1994	Chakoram	Pookunju	
1994	Varaphalam	Broker Hamsa	
1994	Cabinet	Abdukka	
1994	Dhadha	Moosa	
1994	Pakshe	Nanappan	
1994	Sudhinam	School Teacher	
1994	Vadhu Doctoranu	Charlie	
1994	Commissioner	Kunjeeswaran Pillai (Cameo)	
1995	Alancheri Thamprakkal	Kunjali Haji	
1995	Punnaram	Mahadevan	
1995	No. 1 Snehatheeram Bangalore North		
1995	Boxer	Manjeri Mammad	
1995	Sasinas		
1995	Manassasthrajnante Diary		
1995	Samudhayam		
1995	Mannar Mathai Speaking	Photo Archive	
1995	Prayikkara Pappan	Veerappan	
1995	Kalyanji Anandji (film)	Basheer/Swami	
1995	Karma		
1995	Mangalam Veettil Manaseswari Gupta	Karipoor Koya	
1995	Saadaram	Veerappan (Kunjalu)	
1995	Vrudhanmare Sookshikkuka	Home Minister	
1996	Poonilavu		
1996	Rajaputhran	Sayed Jabbar Thangal	
1996	Sallapam	Railway worker	
1996	Swarna Kireedam		
1996	19 April		
1996	Madamma	Vasu	
1996	Thooval Kottaram	Moitheen Hajiar	
1996	Kaanaakkinaavu		
1997	Junior Mandrake	Constable Abu	
1997	Asuravamsam	Moosa	
1997	Itha Oru Snehagatha		
1997	Kannur		
1997	Anubhoothi		
1997	Guru Sishyan	Musthafa	
1997	Kalyana Kacheri	Bharghavan Pillai	
1997	Nagarapuranam	Driver	
1997	Moksham		
1997	Chandralekha	Beeran	
1997	Katha Nayakan	Beerankutty	
1997	Kalyana Uniikal	Al Khobar Anthruman	
1997	Manthra Mothiram	Abdukka	
1997	Oral Mathram	Kunjalikutty	
1997	Sammanam		
1998	Chinthavishtayaya Shyamala	Usman	
1998	Chenaparambile Aanakkaryam		
1998	Kattathoru Penpoovu		
1998	Malabaril Ninnoru Manimaaran		
1998	Mayajalam	Moosa	
1998	Manthrimaalikayil Manassammatham		
1998	Oro Viliyum Kathorthu	Kunjunni Nair	
1998	Kottaram Veettile Apputtan	Kunjahammedkutty	
1998	Kallu Kondoru Pennu	Kabeer	
1998	Aalibabayum Aarara Kallanmarum	Head Constable Peeru Muhammed	
1999	Deepasthambham Mahascharyam	Saithali	
1999	English Medium		
1999	American Ammaayi		
1999	Garshom		
1999	Auto Brothers	Saithikka	
1999	Swastham Gruhabharanam		
1999	Megham	Kuruppu	
1999	Panchapandavar	Gafoorka	
1999	Prem Poojari	Cook	
1999	Veendum Chila Veettukaryangal	Kunjoonju	

==== 2000s ====
Year	Title	Role	Notes
2000	Kannadi Kadavathu		
2000	Swayamvara Panthal	Chandran	
2000	Joker	Khader	
2001	Narendran Makan Jayakanthan Vaka	Remya Nambeeshan	
2001	Korappan the Great	Ranjini Kanth	
2001	Sharjah to Sharjah	Velayudhan	
2001	Onnam Ragam		
2001	Unnathangalil	Mammu	
2001	Dubai	Kunjappukutty	
2001	Ladies and Gentleman		
2001	Goa	Bhasheer	
2001	Bhadra		
2002	Bamboo Boys	Harithakumari's Father	
2002	Puthooramputhri Unniyarcha	Aliyar	
2002	Akhila	Achu	
2002	Swarna Medal	Impayi	
2002	Kayamkulam Kanaran		
2002	Kasillatheyum Jeevikkam		
2002	Yathrakarude Sradhakku	Kunjahammed	
2003	Mazhanool Kanav		
2003	Manassinakkare	Kunji Khader	
2003	Pattanathil Sundaran	Kanaran	
2003	Ammakilikkoodu	Pareekutty	
2003	Soudamini		
2003	Pattalam	Hamsa	
2003	Padam Onnu Oru Vilapam	Hassan Moithu	
2003	Thilakkam	Pathrose	
2003	Choonda	Vijayan	
2003	Mullavalliyum Thenmavum	Postman	
2004	Perumazhakkalam	Abdu	
2004	Maratha Naadu	Alikutty	
2004	Freedom	Moosakka	
2004	Vettam	Hamsa/Ramakartha	
2005	Thaskaraveeran	Beerankutty	
2005	Boyy Friennd	Khader	
2005	Maniyarakkallan		
2005	Naran	Ahmadikka	
2005	Bharathchandran I.P.S.	Kunjeeswaran Pillai	
2006	Shyaamam	Panjayathu President	
2006	Pachakuthira		
2006	Photographer		
2006	Kilukkam Kilukilukkam	Gafoorka	
2006	Rasathanthram	Kunjoonju	
2006	Vargam		
2007	Katha Parayumpol	Devasia	
2007	Kaakki	Constable Chekkutty	
2007	Thaniye	Pappi	
2007	Sorrya Kireedam		
2007	Aakasham	Mammalikka	
2007	Vinodayathra	Ananthan	
2007	Mayavi	Koya	
2007	Kaiyoppu	Alikkoya	
2008	Bullet	Chandramani	
2008	Magic Lamp	Mamukkoya	
2008	Parunthu	Kunjikka	
2008	Minnaminnikoottam	Kunjikannan	
2008	Malabar Wedding	Moonga Avukkar Abubacker	
2008	Shalabam	Velayudhan	
2008	Innathe Chintha Vishayam	Shajahan	
2008	Twenty:20	Khadar	
2009	Sanmanasullavan Appukuttan	Moosa	
2009	Meghatheertham	Abukka	
2009	Ajantha		
2009	Colours		
2009	Changathikooottam	Aliyar	
2009	Kappal Muthalaali		
2009	Shudharil Shudhan	Jabbar	
2009	Currency	Koyaikka	
2009	Kerala Varma Pazhassi Raja	Athan Gurukkal	
2009	Venalmaram		
2009	Bhagyadevatha	Pareethu	

==== 2010s ====
Year	Title	Role	Notes
2010	Nakharam		
2010	Text Book		
2010	Rhythm		
2010	Happy Husbands	Pakshisatrakkaran	
2010	Cocktail	Hakim Seth	
2010	Inganeyum Oral	Appu Pillai	
2010	Koottukar	Ikka	
2010	Akasha Yathra		
2010	Kadha Thudarunnu	Mamachan	
2010	Kandahar	Mullah	
2011	Adimadhyantham		
2011	Manushyamrugam	Anthony	
2011	Innanu Aa Kalyanam	Marriage Broker	
2011	Snehadaram		
2011	Usthava Kanavu		
2011	Teja Bhai & Family		
2011	Kalabha Mazha	Kunjali	
2011	Sevenes	Usman	
2011	Byari		Beary language film
2011	Vellaripravinte Changathi	Moonnaan	
2011	Snehaveedu	Seyyidali	
2011	Oru Marubhoomikkadha	Mammadkutty Bhai	
2011	Indian Rupee	Rayin Ikka	
2012	Baavuttiyude Naamathil		
2012	Puthiya Theerangal		
2012	Face to Face	Aalikkoya	
2012	Ajantha		
2012	Kaashh	Manager	
2012	Lillies of March		
2012	Kalikaalam		
2012	916		
2012	Mallu Singh	Ramankutty	
2012	Mazhavillinattam Vare		
2012	Molly Aunty Rocks!	Salim	
2012	Ustad Hotel	Ummar	
2013	Musafir	Kunjumohammed	
2013	Breaking News Live	Beeran Koya	
2013	Vallatha Pahayan	Saithalikka	
2013	Ithu Manthramo Thanthramo Kuthantramo		
2013	Ezhamathe Varavu	Naagu	
2013	KQ		
2013	Ayal		
2013	Oru Soppetty Katha		
2013	Left Right Left	Kasim	
2013	Lucky Star	Pappan	
2014	Mylanchi Monchulla Veedu		
2014	To Let Ambadi Talkies	Thangal	
2014	Balyakalasakhi	Narayanan Master	
2014	Aamayum Muyalum	Kallu's Father	
2014	Polytechnic	Habeeb	
2014	Swaha		
2014	On the Way		
2014	Nikah		
2014	Day Night Game		
2014	Masala Republic	Beerankka	
2014	To Noora with Love		
2014	Oru Korean Padam		
2014	Karanavar		
2014	Kaliyugaraman		
2014	Salalah Mobiles	Mammad	
2015	Ammakkoru Tharattu		
2015	John Honai	Gafoor	
2015	Cinema @ PWD Rest House	Vijayettan	
2015	KL 10 Patthu	Hamsakutty	
2015	Kunjiramayanam	Welldone Vasu	
2015	Marutha		
2015	Nellikka		
2015	Call Me @		
2015	Oru Second Class Yathra	Alikkoya	
2015	Chirakodinja Kinavukal	Broker	
2015	Rajamma @ Yahoo	Aimoottikka	
2016	Oppam	Kunjikka	
2016	Marubhoomiyile Aana	Gafoor	
2016	Pachakallam		
2016	Sukhamayirikkatte		
2016	Angane Thanne Nethave Anchettennam Pinnale		
2016	Campus Diary		
2017	Godha	Pockerikka	
2017	Puthan Panam	Avukku	
2017	God Say		
2017	Oru Visheshapetta Biriyani Kissa		
2017	Onpatham Valavinappuram		
2017	Hello Dubaikkaran		
2017	Aana Alaralodalaral	Ibrahim	
2017	Aadu 2	Irumbu Abdullah	
2018	Aabhaasam		
2018	Ente Ummante Peru	Hamzakoya	
2018	Kaitholachathan		
2019	Kakshi: Amminippilla	Shanmughan	
2019	Mask	Valiyauppa	
2019	Oru Mass Kadha Veendum	Keshavan	
2019	Swapnarajyam		
2019	Vikruthi	Muhammad	
2019	Muttayikkallanum Mammaliyum		
2019	Vishudha Pusthakam		
2019	Marconi Mathai		
2019	Vallikkettu		
2019	Madhaveeyam		

==== 2020s ====
Year	Title	Role	Notes
2020	Halal Love Story	Abukka	Cameo
2020	Sameer		
2020	Love FM		
2020	Sufiyum Sujatayum	Muezzin	
2021	One	Ibrahim	
2021	Kuruthi	Moosa Khader	
2021	Cabin		
2021	Janazah		
2021	Marakkar: Arabikadalinte Simham	Aboobakkar Haji	
2021	Minnal Murali	Dr. Narayanan	
2021	Oru Thathvika Avalokanam	Aseem Bhai	
2022	Kannadi		
2022	Member Rameshan 9aam Ward	Abu	
2022	Pyali	Nicholan	
2022	Thattasherikootam	Beeran	
2022	Niyogam		
2022	Padachone Ingalu Kaatholee		
2022	Theerppu	Musaliyar	
2022	Peace	Sukumaran	
2023	Uru	Sreedharan Ashari	
2023	Sulaikha Manzil	Moothappa	
2023	Mukalparappu	him self	Posthumous release
2023	Nila	Rahman	Posthumous release
2023	Akkuvinte Padachon		Posthumous release
2024	Manorathangal	Mammadikka	Posthumous release Anthology series Segment:Olavum Theeravum Released on ZEE5
2024	Footage		Posthumous release
2025	Nancy Rani	Kuttanpilla	Posthumous release

=== Other language films ===
Year	Title	Role	Language	Notes
1990	Arangetra Velai		Tamil	
1997	Flames in Paradise	Joseph	German; French	
2006	Kasu	Taxi driver	Tamil	
2022	Cobra	Bhavana's grandfather	Tamil	

== Television ==
- Manasi (Doordarshan)
- Chiri Arangu (Surya Comedy Channel)
- Cinemala (Asianet) as Gafoor (recreation of Nadodikkattu character in one of the episode)
- Akkare Ikkare (2009) Asianet)
- Santhanagopalam (2005) Asianet)
- Badai Bungalow (Asianet) as Guest
- Star Magic (2021) (Flowers) as Guest

== Short films ==
- Native Bappa by Mappila Lahala
- Al Moidu by Zakeen TV
- Funeral of Native Son by Bodhi Silent Scape
