= Maathu =

Indian actress

- Occupations: Actress; Dancer
- Years active: 1977 – 1979; 1988 – 1999; 2019
- Spouses: Dr. Jesu Jacob (divorced); Anbalagan George (m. 2018)
- Children: 2
- Parents: Venkat; Shantha

Madhavi, better known by her stage name Maathu, is an Indian actress who was active during the 1980s and 1990s in Malayalam cinema. She is born to Telugu-speaking parents Venkit and Shantha. She is best known for her role as Radha in the 1991 Malayalam movie Amaram, alongside Mammootty.

== Early life ==
Maathu was born as Madhavi in Chennai to a Telugu-speaking couple named Venkat Rao and Shantha. Her father was a manager in the film industry. She began her film career as a child artist and later went on to play lead roles. During this time, she underwent a spiritual awakening and converted to Christianity and adopted the name Meena.

Maathu married Dr. Jacob, and the couple later divorced. They have a son, Luke, and a daughter, Jaime. In 2018, the actress, who had immigrated to the United States, married a Malaysian native, Anbalagan George. In a 2019 interview, she spoke about her return to the film industry after a 19-year hiatus.

== Filmography ==
Year	Title	Role	Language
2019	Aniyan Kunjum Thannalayathu	Jancy	Malayalam
2011	Uppukandam Brothers: Back in Action	Leena (Archive footage cameo)	Malayalam
2000	Ente Priyappatta Muthuvinu	-	Malayalam
1999	Tokyo Nagarile Viseshangal	Ganga	Malayalam
1999	Aanamuttathe Aangalamar	Jayalakshmi Menon	Malayalam
1999	Aayiram Meni	Lakshmi	Malayalam
1999	Mohakottaram	Lekshmi	Malayalam
1999	Khalanayaka	Jyoti	Kannada
1998	Rakthasakshikal Sindabad	Kunji	Malayalam
1998	Manthri Maalikayil Manasammatham	Rexy	Malayalam
1998	Mattupetti Machan	Parvathy Prabhu	Malayalam
1998	Samaantharangal	Amina	Malayalam
1997	Kalyana Unnikal	Sugandhi	Malayalam
1997	Muddina Kanmani	Ambika	Kannada
1997	Rajanna	Suma	Kannada
1997	Sankeerthanampole	Thulasi	Malayalam
1997	Vaachalam	Meenakshi	Malayalam
1996	Harbour	Panchami	Malayalam
1996	Kanjirappally Kuriachan	Annie	Malayalam
1995	Manikya Chempazhukka	Sreedevi/Rajavalli	Malayalam
1995	Oru Abhibhashakante Case Diary	Shalini	Malayalam
1995	Kaattile Thadi Thevarude Aana	Sindhu	Malayalam
1995	Indian Military Intelligence		Malayalam
1995	Radholsavam	Meenu	Malayalam
1995	Samudhayam	Sathi	Malayalam
1994	Napoleon	Geetha	Malayalam
1994	Gamanam	Syama	Malayalam
1994	Prathakshinam	Rahel	Malayalam
1994	Malappuram Haji Mahanaya Joji	Gouri	Malayalam
1994	Rudraksham	Revathi	Malayalam
1994	Varaphalam	Anjali	Malayalam
1994	Moonnam Loka Pattalam	Gopika	Malayalam
1994	Avan Ananthapadmanabhan		Malayalam
1993	Addeham Enna Iddeham	Nancy	Malayalam
1993	Dollar	Mini	Malayalam
1993	Ente Sreekuttikku	Sreekutty	Malayalam
1993	Uppukandam Brothers	Leena	Malayalam
1993	Oru Kadankatha Pole	Sandhya	Malayalam
1993	Sakshal Sreeman Chathunni	Maya Rajagopal	Malayalam
1993	Aagneyam	Emi	Malayalam
1993	Ekalavyan	Malu	Malayalam
1993	Padaleeputhram		Malayalam
1993	Agnishalabhangal		Malayalam
1992	Kallan Kappalil Thanne	Savithri	Malayalam
1992	Savidham	Reena	Malayalam
1992	Sadayam	Jaya	Malayalam
1992	Pramaanikal		Malayalam
1992	Cheppadividya	Indulekha	Malayalam
1992	Aayushkalam	Sobha	Malayalam
1992	Babai Hotel	Swapna	Telugu
1992	Pudhusa Padukkiren Paattu	Kalyani	Tamil
1991	Sandhesam	Lathika	Malayalam
1991	Parallel College	Indu	Malayalam
1991	Kadalorakkattu	Jayanthi	Malayalam
1991	Thudar Katha	Lakshmi Thampuratti	Malayalam
1991	Amaram	Radha	Malayalam
1991	Naathu Nattaachu	-	Tamil
1990	Kuttettan	Indhu	Malayalam
1990	Kaliyuga Krishna	Jyothi	Kannada
1990	Neene Nanna Jeeva	Raadha	Kannada
1989	Adrushta Rekhe	Shyamala	Kannada
1989	Pooram	Maathu	Malayalam
1989	Manmada Samrajyam	-	Telugu
1988	Jadikketha Moodi	Uma	Tamil
1988	Koil Mani Osai	Valli	Tamil
1979	Neeya?	Child artist	Tamil
1978	Bairavi	Child artist	Tamil
1977	Sanaadi Appanna	Child artist	Kannada

== Advertisement ==
- Hawalker Hawai Chappal
