= Anyarude Bhoomi =

1979 film

- Directed by: Nilambur Balan
- Written by: U. A. Khader
- Screenplay by: U. A. Khader
- Produced by: Unmachithra
- Starring: Chowalloor Krishnankutty; Nilambur Balan; Amina; Kozhikode Sharada
- Cinematography: Ashok Chowdhary
- Music by: A. T. Ummer; Lyrics: Bichu Thirumala
- Production company: Unmachithra
- Distributed by: Unmachithra
- Release date: 9 February 1979
- Country: India
- Language: Malayalam

Anyarude Bhoomi (transl. Outsiders Earth) is a 1979 Indian Malayalam-language film directed by Nilambur Balan and produced by Unmachithra. The film stars Chowalloor Krishnankutty, Nilambur Balan, Amina and Kozhikode Sharada in the lead roles. The film has musical score by A. T. Ummer. The film marks the debut of Mamukkoya.The film was also the directorial debut of Nilambur Balan, an actor and associate of film director P.A. Backer.

== Cast ==
- Chowalloor Krishnankutty
- Nilambur Balan
- Amina
- Kozhikode Sharada
- Kunjandi
- Lalithasree
- Mamukkoya
- Master Anwar
- Nilambur Ayisha
- Zeenath
- Vijayalakshmi

== Soundtrack ==
The music was composed by A. T. Ummer and the lyrics were written by Bichu Thirumala.

No.	Song	Singers	Lyrics	Length (m:ss)
1	"Kodi Chenthaamarappoo"	Peeru Muhammed	Bichu Thirumala	
2	"Manushyamanassaakshikal"	Bichu Thirumala	Bichu Thirumala	
