= Mukunthetta Sumitra Vilikkunnu =

1988 film by Priyadarshan

- DVD cover
- Directed by: Priyadarshan
- Written by: Sreenivasan
- Produced by: G. P. Vijayakumar
- Starring: Mohanlal; Sreenivasan; Ranjini
- Narrated by: Priyadarshan
- Cinematography: S. Kumar
- Edited by: L. Bhoominathan
- Music by: Ouseppachan
- Production company: Seven Arts
- Distributed by: Seven Arts Release
- Release date: 29 January 1988
- Country: India
- Language: Malayalam

Mukunthetta Sumitra Vilikkunnu (transl. Mukunthetta, Sumitra is calling) is a 1988 Indian Malayalam-language romantic comedy film directed by Priyadarshan and written by Sreenivasan. It stars Mohanlal, Sreenivasan, and Ranjini. The story is based on the Marathi play Sasa Aani Kasav (Hare and Tortoise), which was earlier adapted into the 1983 movie Katha.

== Plot ==
Mukundan K. Kartha is a simple man, with a decent job, whose old college classmate and friend Viswanath comes to meet him. He lives in a small residential colony in Chennai, where there's a water shortage and the people struggle to make ends meet. The damsel of the colony, Sumithra likes Mukundan. Viswanath is a fraud and con-man and he makes Mukundan and the people of his colony believe that he is an influential person and classmate of the Public Works Department minister. He makes the people believe that, due to his influence, water pipes arrived at the colony.

Viswanath befriends businessman C. P. Menon and promises to obtain an import license for Chinese leather. Viswanath uses Mukundan to obtain money from one of his other victims, which causes Mukundan to lose his job and get arrested by the police.

Viswanath even tries to steal the woman Mukundan loves, Sumitra, and plans to marry her by tricking her family into thinking that he is rich.

Viswanath goes missing when the people discover that he had tricked them all. Viswanath tries to flee to Dubai, but Mukudan catches him at the airport, and tears his flight ticket. Finally Mukundan and Sumitra confess their love and get married.

== Cast ==
- Mohanlal as Mukundan Krishnan Kartha
- Sreenivasan as Viswanath
- Ranjini as Sumithra
- Nedumudi Venu as Kumaran Nair
- Thikkurissy Sukumaran Nair as Menon
- K.P.A.C. Lalitha as Sumithra's mother
- M. G. Soman as C. P. Menon
- Kuthiravattam Pappu as Ouseppachan
- Jagathi Sreekumar as Gopi
- Innocent as Ramankutty Nair
- Maniyanpilla Raju as Surendran
- Cochin Haneefa as Kunjambu, a police inspector
- Bobby Kottarakkara as Narayanan, a water supplier
- Thodupuzha Vasanthi as Renuka, Kumaran Nair's Wife
- Jalaja as Lathika, Gopi's wife
- Pavithran

== Soundtrack ==
All lyrics are written by Shibu Chakravarthy; all music is composed by Ouseppachan.

No.	Title	Artist(s)	Length
1.	"Ormakal Odi"	M. G. Sreekumar
2.	"Ormakal Odi"	K. S. Chithra, M. G. Sreekumar
3.	"Poovine"	M. G. Sreekumar, Sujatha Mohan, Janamma David
