= Kalyana Rasi =

- Title card
- Directed by: K. Sivaprasad
- Story by: I. S. N. Ravi
- Produced by: S. Ganeshkumar
- Starring: Karthik; Ranjini; Apoorva
- Cinematography: S. V. Srikanth
- Edited by: K. Shankar; V. Devan
- Music by: Manoj–Gyan
- Production company: Sankaralaya Pictures
- Release date: 14 April 1990
- Running time: 130 minutes
- Country: India
- Language: Tamil

Kalyana Rasi (/rɑːsɪ/ transl. Marriage horoscope) is a 1990 Indian Tamil-language film directed by debutant K. Sivaprasad and produced by Thirumal S. Ganesh. The film stars Karthik, Ranjini and Apoorva. It was released on 14 April 1990.

== Plot ==
Sulochana, who is in fear of a military personnel, elopes from her house when she is engaged to a military officer. She gets a job as a maid in Murali's house, who is a military officer. She starts to fall for him and knows that he is an army officer. She realises that not every army officer is bad, and she tries to express her love to Murali. A person informs Sulochana's father that Sulochana is staying in Murali's house, which might create issues in Manju's marriage. Sulochana's father meets Sulochana and reveals that Murali is engaged to Manju, and he also bashes her for eloping from the house. He also tells her that his honour was saved by his younger daughter Manju, so she is the one who has all the rights to marry Murali. Sulochana tries to kill herself in disappointment and let Manju and Murali marry but Sulochana is taken to hospital by Murali's parents. In the hospital, Murali's friend reveals that she is in love with Murali. What happens next forms the crux of the story.

== Cast ==
- Karthik as Murali
- Ranjini as Sulochana alias Mynaa
- Apoorva (debut) as Manju
- M. N. Nambiar as Murali's father
- Jai Ganesh as Sokkalingam
- Anandaraj as Periya Thambi
- Manorama as Murali's mother
- Jahnvi
- Varalakshmi
- Jothi Chandra
- Jaishankar as Brigade Ear Vishwanathan (cameo appearance)

== Production ==
The film marked the directorial debut of K. Shivaprasad, son of editor and director K. Shankar. The film was launched at AVM Studios in December 1986 under the title Veyiladikkudhu Mazhaiyum Peiyudhu and the song "Pathinettu Vayadhu" was recorded on the same day.

== Soundtrack ==
Soundtrack was composed by Manoj–Gyan.

Track listing
No.	Title	Lyrics	Singer(s)	Length
1.	"Aayiram Thalaimurai"	Pulamaipithan	K. J. Yesudas, K. S. Chithra
2.	"Idhu Veyiladikkum"	Kamakodiyan	Vani Jairam, K. S. Chithra
3.	"Kanniponnu"	Muthulingam	K. S. Chithra, B. S. Sasirekha
4.	"Pathinettu Vayadhu"	Gangai Amaran	P. Jayachandran, K. S. Chithra

== Reception ==
P. S. S. of Kalki praised the performances of Karthik, Manorama and Nambiar but felt the climax twist was artificial if it was not there, the film would have died a natural death.
