= Bombat Hendthi =

- Directed by: P. N. Ramachandra Rao
- Written by: P. N. Ramachandra Rao
- Screenplay by: P. N. Ramachandra Rao
- Produced by: R. Sriramulu
- Starring: Shridhar; Shruti; Ramesh Bhat; Sihi Kahi Chandru
- Cinematography: Babji
- Edited by: B Shankar; S Ramesh
- Music by: Upendra Kumar
- Production company: R S Productions
- Release date: 1992
- Running time: 138 minutes
- Country: India
- Language: Kannada

Bombat Hendthi is a 1992 Indian Kannada-language comedy drama film directed by P. N. Ramachandra Rao and produced by R. Sriramulu. The movie was a remake of Rao's own Telugu film Chitram Bhalare Vichitram (1991) which itself is a remake of Bengali film Joy Maa Kali Boarding (1955). The film featured an ensemble cast including Shridhar, Ramesh Bhat, Sihi Kahi Chandru, Shruti, Abhinaya, Anjali and Tennis Krishna. The film's music was composed by Upendra Kumar and cinematography is by Babji.

== Plot ==
Sridhar, Sihi Kahi Chandru, Ramesh Bhat, and Tennis Krishna are good friends and stay together as tenants at Dhirendra Gopal's residence. After being thrown out of the house they start searching for a new house to rent but no one is ready to give their house to bachelors.

Finally, they land up in a place where the landlady insists on having a family as her tenants. The four bachelors dress up to be a man (Ramesh Bhat), his retarded brother (Tennis Krishna), his father (Sihi Kahi Chandru) and his wife (Shridhar). Later, Sridhar falls in love with the landlady's daughter, and all hell breaks loose.

== Cast ==
- Shridhar as Shridhar and Prema
- Ramesh Bhat as Ramesh
- Sihi Kahi Chandru as Chandru
- Tennis Krishna as Krishna
- Shruti
- Manju Malini
- Abhinaya
- Anjali
- Mukhyamantri Chandru
- Dheerendra Gopal
- Mysore Lokesh
- Vijay Kashi
- Dingri Nagaraj
- Mandeep Roy
- Atthili Lakshmi
- Shanthamma
- Bank Janardhan
- Srishailan
- Negro Johnny

== Soundtrack ==
The music of the film was composed by Upendra Kumar with lyrics by R. N. Jayagopal.

Track listing
| No. | Title | Lyrics | Singer(s) | Length |
|---|---|---|---|---|
| 1. | "Kaaranji Haage" | R. N. Jayagopal | S. P. Balasubrahmanyam & Sangeetha Katti |
| 2. | "Bengalooru Nagarada" | R. N. Jayagopal | S. P. Balasubrahmanyam |
| 3. | "Seetha Maatheya" | R. N. Jayagopal | Sangeetha Katti |
| 4. | "Love Love" | R. N. Jayagopal | S. P. Balasubrahmanyam & Manjula Gururaj |
| 5. | "Naanondu Maduve" | R. N. Jayagopal | S. P. Balasubrahmanyam |
