= Neethana Antha Kuyil =

- Poster
- Directed by: R. Selvaraj
- Screenplay by: Bharathiraja
- Story by: R. Selvaraj
- Produced by: R. Veeraraghavan
- Starring: Lakshmi; Raja; Ranjini
- Cinematography: P. C. Sreeram
- Edited by: V. Rajagopal; P. Mohanraj
- Music by: Ilaiyaraaja
- Production company: Kaladharshan Films
- Release date: 20 June 1986
- Country: India
- Language: Tamil

Neethana Antha Kuyil (transl. Are you that koel?) is a 1986 Indian Tamil-language crime drama film directed by R. Selvaraj. The film stars Lakshmi, Raja and Ranjini. It was released on 20 June 1986.

== Cast ==
- Lakshmi
- Raja
- Ranjini
- Rajeev
- Janagaraj
- Chitra Lakshmanan
- Vinoth
- Nadanamani Balu
- Master Satish
- Vellai Subbaiah
- Kumarimuthu
- Kullamani

== Production ==
The film was prominently shot at Fort Dansborg. The screenplay was written by Bharathiraja, and the dialogues by Panchu Arunachalam.

== Soundtrack ==
The music was composed by Ilaiyaraaja. "Poojaiketha Poovidhu" was the first song offer for a Tamil film to singer K. S. Chithra, and was originally intended for a different film Pachaikodi. It is set in the Carnatic raga Suddhadhanyasi. The song was interpolated by N. R. Raghunanthan for "Edhukku Machan" from Mapla Singam (2016).

Track listing
No.	Title	Lyrics	Singer(s)	Length
1.	"En Jeevan Paaduthu" (female)	Panchu Arunachalam	S. Janaki	5:35
2.	"Kannana Kanna" (duet)	Vairamuthu	K. J. Yesudas, Sangeetha	4:31
3.	"Manam Karukudhu"	Gangai Amaran	Malaysia Vasudevan, Uma Ramanan	4:30
4.	"Poojaiketha Poovidhu"	Vairamuthu	Gangai Amaran, K. S. Chithra	4:35
5.	"Paartha Idu Pachaikili"	Vairamuthu	Malaysia Vasudevan, Sai Baba	4:33
6.	"Kannana Kanna" (female)	Vairamuthu	K. S. Chithra	4:31
7.	"En Jeevan Paaduthu" (male)	Panchu Arunachalam	K. J. Yesudas	5:41
Total length:				33:56

== Release and reception ==
Neethana Antha Kuyil was released on 20 June 1986. Jayamanmadhan of Kalki praised Ranjini's acting but panned Lakshmi's acting as artificial while also praising Ilaiyaraaja's music and Sreeram's cinematography and concluded the review with questioning the director for confusing everything.
