= Gandhinagar Rendava Veedhi =

1987 film directed by P. N. Ramachandra Rao

- Audio Cover
- Directed by: P. N. Ramachandra Rao
- Written by: Jandhyala (dialogues)
- Screenplay by: P. N. Ramachandra Rao
- Story by: Sreenivasan
- Based on: Gandhinagar 2nd Street (1986)
- Produced by: G. Reddy Sekhar; J. Gopal Reddy; P. Pardhasaradhi Reddy; Sarath Babu (Presents)
- Starring: Rajendra Prasad; Chandra Mohan; Gautami
- Cinematography: N. S. Raju
- Edited by: P. Sambasiva Rao
- Music by: G. Anand
- Production company: Suseela Arts
- Release date: 16 July 1987
- Running time: 132 minutes
- Country: India
- Language: Telugu

Gandhinagar Rendava Veedhi (transl. Gandhinagar 2nd Street) is a 1987 Indian Telugu-language comedy film, produced by G. Reddy Shekar, J.Gopal Reddy and P. Pardhasaradhi Reddy under the Suseela Arts banner, Presented by Sarath Babu and directed by P. N. Ramachandra Rao. It stars Rajendra Prasad, Chandra Mohan, Gautami and music composed by G. Anand. The film is the debut of actress Gautami in the film industry and was released on 16 July 1987. The film is a remake of the Malayalam film Gandhinagar 2nd Street (1986).

== Cast ==
- Rajendra Prasad as Prabhu / Ram Singh
- Chandra Mohan as Prasad
- Sarath Babu as Ravi
- Jaya Sudha as Sharada Teacher
- Gautami as Geeta
- Ranganath as C.I.
- Suthi Veerabhadra Rao as Srikalam
- Mallikarjuna Rao as Constable
- Balaji as Raghu
- Hema Sundar as Contractor Ramachandraiah
- Gummaluuri Sastry as a Madman
- Satti Babu as Prabhu's mate
- Dham as Prabhu's mate
- Rama Prabha as Bharathi
- Kakinada Shyamala as Sarpakam
- Tatineni Rajeswari as Geeta's mother
- Dubbing Janaki as Prasad's mother

== Soundtrack ==
Music composed by G. Anand was released on SEA Records Company.

Track list
No.	Title	Lyrics	Singer(s)	Length
1.	"Kalakaanidi Nijamainadi"	Acharya Aatreya	S. P. Balasubrahmanyam	4:55
2.	"Tholisaari Thelisindi"	Sirivennela Seetharama Sastry	S. P. Balasubrahmanyam, S. Janaki	4:51
3.	"Jebulu Kotte"	Sirivennela Seetharama Sastry	S. P. Balasubrahmanyam, S. Janaki	6:01
Total length:				15:47
