= Amaram =

1991 Indian Malayalam drama film

- Theatrical poster
- Directed by: Bharathan
- Written by: A. K. Lohithadas
- Produced by: Babu Thiruvalla
- Starring: Mammootty; Maathu; KPAC Lalitha; Ashokan; Murali
- Cinematography: Madhu Ambat
- Edited by: V. T. Vijayan; B. Lenin
- Music by: Raveendran (songs); Johnson (score)
- Production companies: Mak Productions; Symphony Creations
- Release date: 1 February 1991
- Running time: 137 minutes
- Country: India
- Language: Malayalam

Amaram (transl. Stern) is a 1991 Indian Malayalam drama film directed by Bharathan and written by A. K. Lohithadas. It stars Mammootty, Maathu, K. P. A. C. Lalitha, Ashokan, Murali, Chitra, and Kuthiravattam Pappu in the main roles. The film's score is composed by Johnson while the songs are by Raveendran.

K. P. A. C. Lalitha won the National Film Award for Best Supporting Actress for her role as Bhargavi, and Mammootty won the Filmfare Awards South Best Actor Award for his role. The film was a critical and commercial success. It ran for more than 200 days in Ragam theater, Thrissur, and played for over 50 days at Safire (Madras) theater.

== Plot ==
Achootty, a fisherman, lives with his daughter, Radha. The uneducated Achootty wants his daughter to be educated and become a doctor. His dreams are shattered when she falls in love with her childhood friend Raghavan, which results in Achootty beating him up. Achootty restricts her from seeing Raghavan and tells her that education is the top priority. Kochuraman who is Raghavan's father suggests that Achootty accept Radha's relationship with Raghavan to which Achootty scornfully disapproves, resulting in Kochuraman's hatred towards Achootty. One day, Radha and Raghavan elope and get married, leaving Achootty heartbroken. Achootty does not like his son-in-law initially and in disappointment, does not talk to his daughter either. But slowly the young Raghavan shows that he is an able and hard-working fisherman and gains Achootty's silent admiration. Achootty does not acknowledge this publicly and keeps heckling his son-in-law in public, taunting him to catch a shark and prove himself before daring to talk to Achootty. One day, Raghavan decides he's had enough of the taunting and goes to the deep sea to capture a shark. But he is inexperienced, and in a fit of daring, goes out alone in his catamaran. When he does not return, people suspect that Achootty killed him at sea as Achootty had also been to the sea that day.

It is a stormy night and everyone is afraid of going to the sea to search for him. Kochuraman and some of the villagers attack him. At this point, Achootty's daughter also feels that her father has killed her husband and blames him. Having nothing to lose anymore, Achootty goes to the sea and finds Raghavan lying unconscious on the remains of his boat which is wrecked. Achootty rescues him and brings him back to the shore. Everyone understands Achootty's innocence but he feels let down by them. In the end, Achootty takes his boat and ventures into the sea, saying that is the only entity that has loved him unconditionally.

== Cast ==
- Mammootty as Achootty, an uneducated fisherman
- Maathu as Radha/Muthhu, the only daughter of Achootty whom he wishes to be a doctor
- Murali as Kochu Raman, Raghavan's father
- Ashokan as Raghavan, Radha's love interest, Jeevan John as young Raghavan
- KPAC Lalitha as Bhargavi, Raghavan's mother
- Chithra as Chandrika, Kochuraman's sister
- Balan K. Nair as Pillaichan
- Kuthiravattam Pappu as Raman Kutty
- Zainuddin as Damodaran

== Music ==
The film score was composed by Johnson. The film's soundtrack contains four songs composed by Raveendran. The lyrics were written by Kaithapram Damodaran Namboothiri. The song "Hridaya Raga Thanthri" is based on "Humko Man Ki Shakti Dena" from Guddi.

#	Title	Singer(s)	Raga(s)
1	"Azhake Ninmizhi"	K. J. Yesudas, K. S. Chitra	Darbari Kanada
2	"Hridaya Raga Thanthri"	Lathika	Hameer Kalyani
3	"Pulare Poonkotiyil"	K. J. Yesudas, Lathika	Raagamalika (Vaasanthi, Shuddha Saveri, Hindolam, Shuddha Saveri)
4	"Vikara Naukayumai"	K. J. Yesudas	Madhyamavathi

== Awards ==
38th National Film Awards

- Best Supporting Actress - KPAC Lalitha

Kerala State Film Awards

- Second Best Actor - Murali
- Second Best Actress - KPAC Lalitha
- Best Cinematography - Madhu Ambat

Filmfare Awards South

- Best Actor (Malayalam) - Mammootty

== Legacy ==
The movie is considered a classical masterpiece in the Mollywood industry.
