= P. N. Ramachandra Rao =

Indian film director and producer

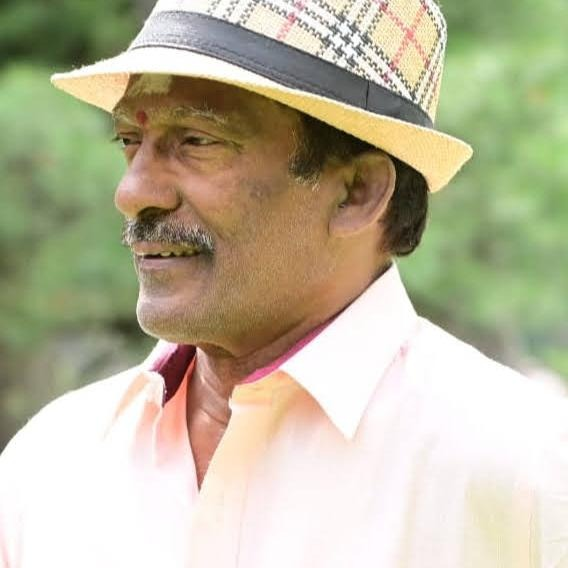
- Born: Chadalavaada Village, Tenali Taluk, Guntur Dist., A.P., India
- Other name: PNR
- Occupations: Film director, Producer and Screenwriter
- Years active: 1980–present

P. N. Ramchandar Rao is an Indian film director, producer who has worked on Telugu and few Kannada films.

Born in Chadalavada village, PNR lived in childhood Parlapalli Village, Nellore dist. until he moved to Chennai to join in films.

In 1973, he joined P. Chandrashekar Reddy, a film director who also hails from Nellore, and worked for the film Kottha Kapuram. the film stars Krishna S.V. Ranga Rao, Bharathi Gummadi and others.

== Career ==
P. N. Ramachandra Rao is a Telugu film director and producer, with his friends as partners, and produced couple of hits like Gandhinagar Rendava Veedhi and Chitram Bhalare Vichitram (1991) in his direction. He produced total 12 films till now.

== Filmography ==
- Private Master (1967)
- Merupu Daadi (1984) (Introduced actress Devi opposite Bhanuchander)
- Gandhinagar Rendava Veedhi (1987)
- August 15 Raatri (1988)
- Master Kapuram (1990) (Introduced Sudharani as Heroine)
- Chitram Bhalare Vichitram (1991)
- Pelli Neeku Shobhanam Naku (1992)
- Bombat Hendthi (Kannada) (1992)
- Asale Pellaina Vaanni (1993)
- Attaku Koduku Mamaku Alludu (1993)
- Leader (1995) (Introduced Priyaraman as Heroine)
- Sahanam (1996)
- Subhavartha (1998) (partially reshot as Mannavaru Chinnavaru in Tamil)
- Jodi Simhagallu (Kannada) (1999)
- Jackpot (Producer) (2001)
- Golmaal (2003)
- Abhinandana (2005) (Kannada)

Television Series

- "Bhakta Markandeya" (2000) (telecasted in E TV) ( Jr. N.T R as Teen lead character 'Markandeya' )
