= Thakshashila =

- Directed by: Sreekumar Krishnan Nair (as K. Shrikuttan)
- Written by: A.K.Sajan
- Produced by: Menaka Sureshkumar
- Starring: Suresh Gopi; Shankar (actor); Vani Viswanath; Shanthi Krishna; Jagadeesh; Vineeth; Captain Raju
- Music by: Songs: MG Radhakrishnan; Background score: S. P. Venkatesh
- Release date: 1995
- Country: India
- Language: Malayalam

Thakshashila is a 1995 Indian Malayalam-language film directed by Sreekumar Krishnan Nair (as K. Shrikuttan), starring Suresh Gopi in lead role.

== Plot ==
Gautam Krishna is an ace mountaineer and instructor at the government institute in Himachal who has climbed the Himalayas over and again and helps the police in missions there, sometimes involving terrorists and insurgents. In the latter, he is usually brought in by his friends and admirers like DSP Rajeevan, while corrupt officers at the higher end like SP Chowdhary and the DGP K. M. Nair himself are shown to have a grudge against him. Even at his own institute, Deputy Director Sheela Nambiar bears grudges against him and constantly tries to thwart him while the Director Wilson Pereira tries to tone the irreverent Gautam down so that his services and expertise aren't lost to the institute.

Gautam lives with his sister Ganga Menon who is a customs officer. They happen to have a tragic past and childhood, their father having shown to have betrayed the Indian Army somehow for which their mother was tortured and killed. As such, Gautam hates his father, who is since then unheard of, to the core, while Ganga harbours mixed feelings. Ganga also happens to be recovering from the shock of her fiancée's accidental death, Gautam unsuccessfully trying to convince her for another marriage. Unexpectedly one day, Ganga comes face to face with their father, Major Madhavan, who, after having been released from jail, has come to her for some official pass, along with his adopted daughter Motti. Ganga begins seeing her father and step-sister while she hasn't found the courage to tell Gautam yet.

In the meanwhile Ganga arranges for a girl Amalendu to meet Gautam. Though initially stalled by their respective attitudes, they soon hit it off. They are soon engaged, while at the mountaineering institute, instructors Charlie and Salman also have their own romances with another female trainer and a young cadet Sindhu respectively.

During a combined operation, Ganga and Rajeevan bust a link of a top businessman Prince who also controls insurgency-terrorism in the North West, and are subsequently warned. Ganga decides to lie low, though the irreverent young Turk Gautam disagrees. Soon, he is visited by meet political lobbyist Stephen Fernandes on a mission from Prince. There is a crashed airplane high up in the Himalayas containing confidential documents crucial to Prince, and he wants Gautam to recover it from the risky altitude. Gautam naturally refuses in style, angering Prince and his lobby. To force Gautam accede, they kidnap Salman. Gautam reluctantly climbs the peaks to the crashed plane, but finds that the documents Prince wants are classified information from the Indian Army. Putting two and two together, he hands over the documents to the governments with full report, sending shock waves across the country's political spectrum and exposing Prince for the first time.

An angry but troubled Prince, while attempting to flee the country, is ambushed by Gautam and his mountaineering team, and subsequently arrested. Prince and his team, though flustered, is no worse for the fiasco, and plots revenge.

Soon, Wilson Pereira, Director of the mountaineering institute goes missing in the hills, and Gautam is framed for his murder. With Gautam off the scene, Ganga is killed brutally by Stephen Fernandes while Amalendu and Salman are captured and taken away. Associates of Prince like Sheela Nambiar and Chowdhary present false evidence against Gautam in court and he is incarcerated. While Gautam is helplessly tucked away in jail, Prince's team plots his death through a fake escape bid, which would also serve to get a terrorist out of jail. However, Gautam's resourcefulness turns the tide and he escapes while the terrorist gets killed.

Now a fugitive on the run from the nation, Gautam is sheltered by Major Madhavan and Charlie. Plotting revenge, they capture Sheela Nambiar and get her brutally raped for information. Panicked, Stephen Fernandes tries to flee to Delhi but is ambushed and captured by Gautam and Major Madhavan. Prince releases the captive Amalendu in a bid to uncover Gautam's hideout. Prince's brother succeeds in this gets killed by Major Madhavan before he could reveal the same to his brother. Tortured, Stephen reveals that Salman was killed brutally and that Wilson Pereira is living.

In a shocking revelation, it is shown that Wilson Pereira, a top bureaucrat, had always been an associate of Prince, and has been faking his death in the bid to frame Gautam. In a final showdown involving automated rifles and rocket launchers, Gautam and Major Madhavan finishes off Prince, Chowdhary and the whole team while Pereira is taken to the law to clear Gautam's name.

== Cast ==
- Suresh Gopi as Gautham Krishna
- Vani Viswanath as Amalendu
- Shanthi Krishna as Ganga Menon
- Jagadeesh as Charlie
- Vineeth as Salman
- Captain Raju as Major Madhavan
- Ratheesh as Prince
- Shankar as Rajeevan
- M. G. Soman as D.G.P Nair
- Suchitra as Motti
- Riza Bava as Stephen Fernandes
- Sharat Saxena as Chowdhari
- Mannar Rajan as Wincent Perera
- Geetha Vijayan as Cadet
- Rekha as Lakshmi
- Renuka as Dy.Director Sheela Nambiar
- Sindhu as Sindhu
