= O' Faby =

1993 film by Sreekumar Krishnan Nair

- Theatrical poster
- Directed by: K. Shrikuttan
- Written by: Simon Tharakan; Dialogues: Satheesh Babu Payyannur
- Screenplay by: Simon Tharakan
- Story by: Jensher
- Produced by: Simon Tharakan
- Starring: Nagesh; Thilakan; Srividya; Roque Tharakan; Manoj K. Jayan
- Cinematography: Jayanan Vincent; P. N. Sundaram; K. Ramachandra Babu; Venugopal
- Edited by: M. S. Mani
- Music by: Johnson; Lyrics: Bichu Thirumala
- Animation by: Ram Mohan Biographics & Gimmicks
- Production company: Jensher Productions
- Distributed by: Jensher Productions
- Release date: 27 August 1993
- Country: India
- Language: Malayalam
- Budget: ₹1.4 crore

O' Faby is a 1993 Malayalam-language film. It was Asia's first full-length live-action/animation hybrid feature film. Directed by Sreekumar Krishnan Nair. It stars Nagesh, Thilakan, Roque Tharakan, Manoj K. Jayan and Srividya. The director of animation was Ram Mohan. Singers K. J. Yesudas, K. S. Chithra and S. P. Balasubrahmanyam sing songs with lyrics penned by Bichu Thirumala. The cinematography team included Jayanan Vincent, Ramachandra Babu P. N. Sundaram and Venugopal Madathil.

== Plot ==
O' Faby tells the story of the friendship between the hero and the animated character, Faby. The producer's son Roque played the hero role. The hero experiences many troubles but is saved by Faby.

== Cast ==
- Shammi Thilakan (voice) & Mela Raghu (motion capture) as Faby
- Roque Tharakan as Sandy (voiced by Sudheesh)
- Nagesh as Muthu Swami
- Thilakan as Commissioner Nair
- Srividya as Sophie
- Devan as John
- Nassar as S.I Sekher
- Ilavarasi as Jeni
- Manoj K. Jayan as S.I Siby
- Krishnankutty Nair as Slum man
- N. L. Balakrishnan as Fernandez
- Philomina as Mary
- Ashokan
- Subair as C.I Jayashankar
- Jagathy Sreekumar as Rappai
- Narendra Prasad as Saint
- Raghavan as P.C Rajaram
- Mamukkoya as Tea seller
- Sukumari as Slum Lady
- Divya Unni as Child
- Sandra Thomas as Child
- Sachith Soju as Child
- Shajith as Kishore
- Rafeeq as Christopher

== Production ==
=== Development ===
Sreekumar Krishnannair (K. Sreekuttan), son of veteran director M. Krishnan Nair decided to make a live-action animated film after watching Who Framed Roger Rabbit and wanted to attempt similar experiment in Malayalam. Simon Tharakan, an NRI who learned of a news article about a mechanical robot founded by Sreekuttan's friend VS Sabu travelled to India to meet the inventor and he decided to produce a film.

VS Sabu and Tharakan decided to have Sreekuttan to handle the direction after observing his work on the sets of Sargam. Sreekuttan expressed his interest to do a live-action animated film to which they agreed. Tharakan came up with a concept based on character Fagin from Oliver Twist. Tharakan's son Roquey was chosen to portray the film's main protagonist.

=== Filming ===
To make actors react and emote to the animated character, Sreekuttan chosen Raghu of Mela to play human version of Faby and a costume was created to resemble the sketches of Faby and given to Raghu. After this, the scenes were shot again leaving spaces to be “filled in later” with the animated figures.

For the post-production to include animation, makers met Ram Mohan, father of animation who scolded them for making a film without employing an animator for pre-production and for not story boarding the film however he then gave them drawings for the cartoon characters along with a template of expressions for each situation. Makers had problems in including the animated sequences to the footage so a basic Click 3 camera was bought and a halogen light was fixed onto it, "Each film from O’ Faby's reels was then fixed onto the Click 3 camera for the image to get magnified, making the tracing simpler". Around 50 artists too were hired full-time to sketch the cartoon characters into cel sheets which went on for more than a year. The film's budget was around 1.4. crores.

== Soundtrack ==
Soundtrack was composed by Johnson and the lyrics by Bichu Thirumala.

- O Faby - K. J. Yesudas
- Rajapakshi - K. J. Yesudas
- Dingara Dinga - S. P. Balasubrahmanyam
- Thaaazhathum - K. S. Chithra

== Release ==
Simon Tharakan who produced the film had distributed it all by himself. The film was released in August 1993 despite hype, the film failed at the box-office.
