= K. Jayakumar =

Indian civil servant

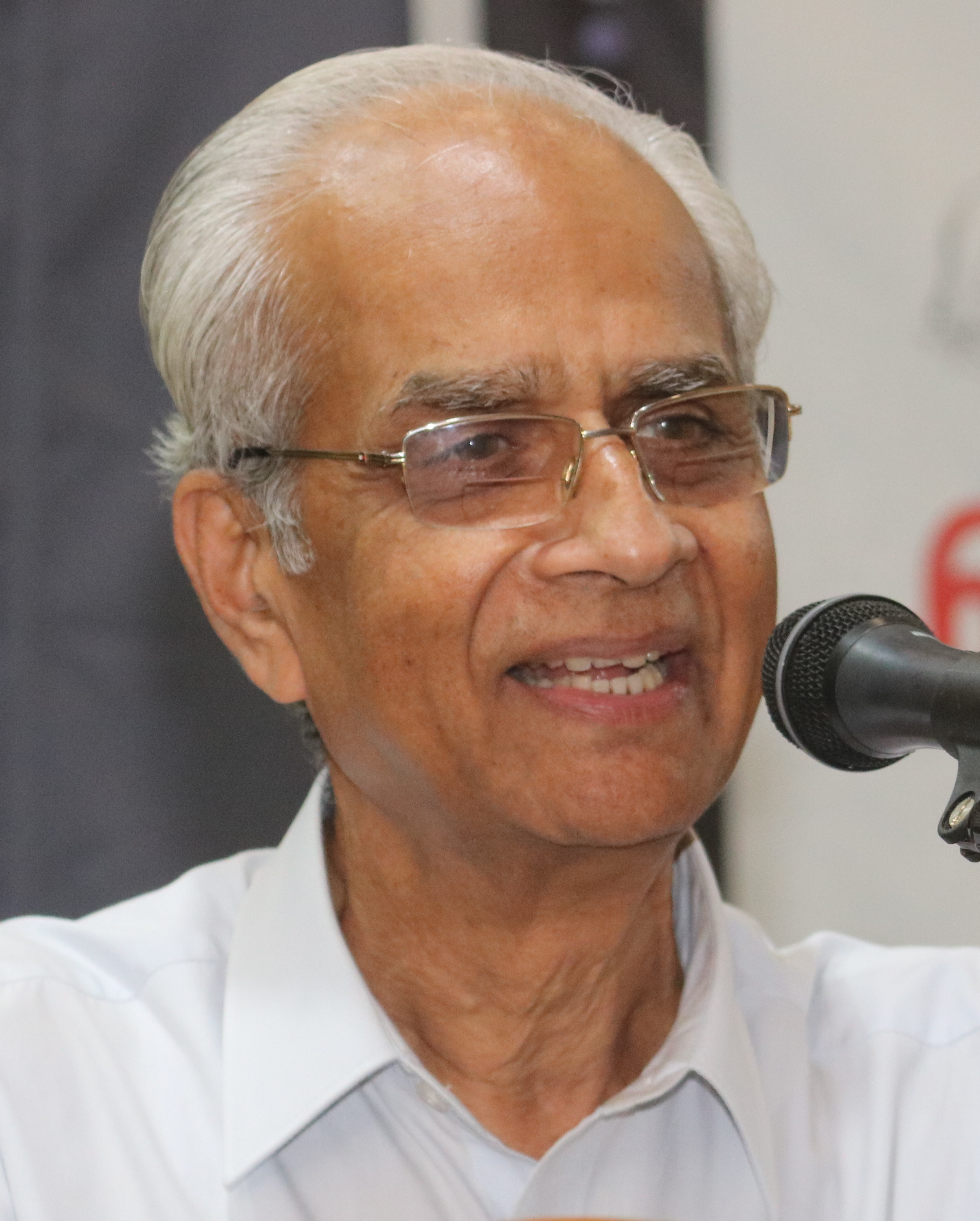
- Born: 6 October 1952 (age 74); Thiruvananthapuram, Travancore-Cochin, India
- Occupations: Poet; lyricist; screenwriter; bureaucrat
- Parent(s): M. Krishnan Nair (Father); Sulochana Devi (Mother); Sreekumar Krishnan Nair (Brother)
- Awards: Kerala Sahitya Akademi Award; Asan Poetry Prize

Krishnan Jayakumar (born 6 October 1952) is an Indian civil servant, poet, lyricist, translator, and screenwriter. and author. He was an Indian Administrative Service (IAS) officer from Kerala who retired as the Chief Secretary of the Government of Kerala. He is the son of film director M. Krishnan Nair. He has served as the founding vice-chancellor of the Malayalam University.

== Career ==
Jayakumar belongs to 1978 batch of IAS. He began his civil service career as an Assistant Collector in 1980. During his career, Jayakumar held important bureaucratic positions at various levels in the Governments of Kerala and India, including District Collector, Kozhikode; Director of Tourism Department, Government of Kerala; Director of Public Instructions (DPI), Kerala;, Secretary, Tourism and Culture, Managing Director, Film Development Corporation, Joint Secretary, Ministry of Tourism & Culture, Government of India; Agriculture Production Commissioner, Government of Kerala. He served as the Chief Secretary, Government of Kerala during the period April 2012 to October 2012. In 2008, Jayakumar was honored by presenting the first K.P.S. Menon Memorial Award in recognition to his distinguished service as a bureaucrat. On retirement as the Chief Secretary, Jayakumar was appointed as the first Vice-Chancellor of the Thunchath Ezhuthachan Malayalam University. He is currently the Director of Institute of Management in Government, Thiruvananthapuram & Chairman of Sathya Sai IAS Academy, located in Sai Gramam, Thonnakkal, Thiruvananthapuram.

=== Literary career ===
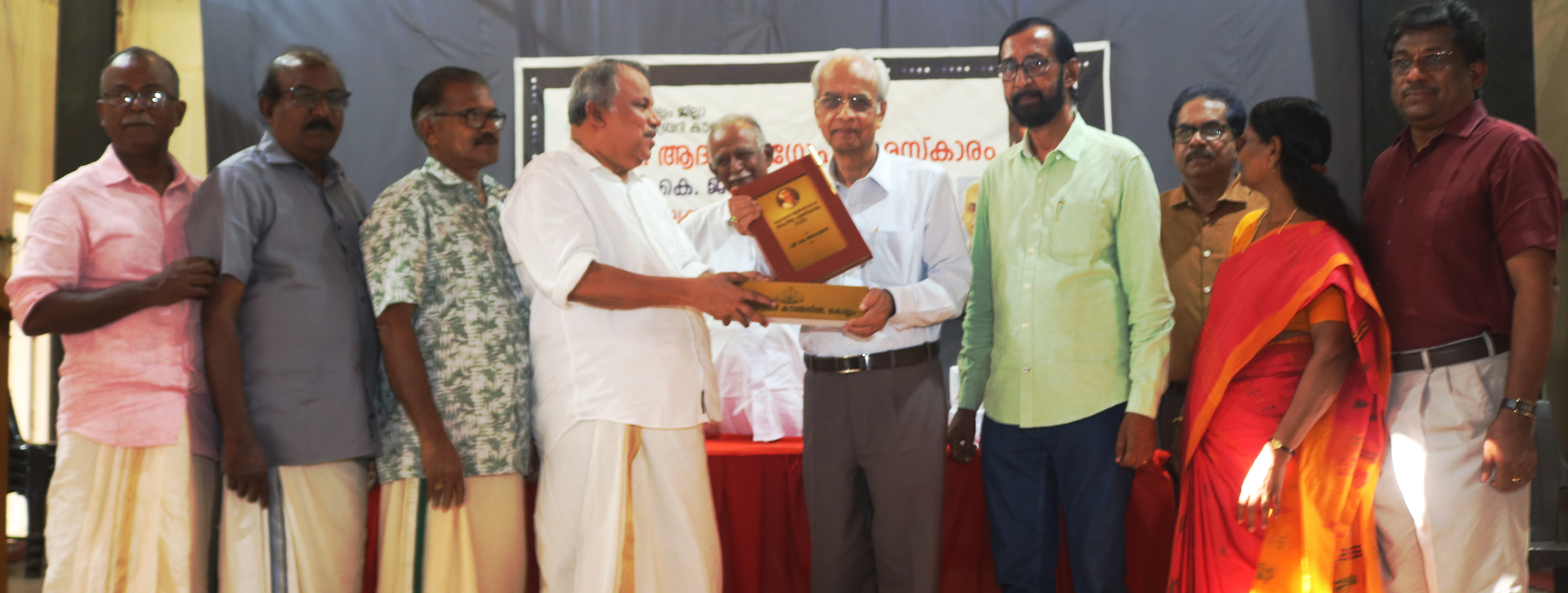
Jayakumar IAS receiving Prof Adinadu Gopi award at Kollam 2025

Jayakumar is also a poet, lyricist, screenwriter and painter. He has written lyrics for nearly 100 Malayalam films and large number of songs for albums, Television and radio. He has also written and directed a children's film. He has held 17 solo exhibitions in India and abroad. He has authored twenty five books in Malayalam, and four works in English. His translations of Tagore, Kahlil Gibran and Rumi are well acclaimed. His popular film songs include Kudajadriyil Kudikollum, Chandanalepa Sugandham, Souparnikamritha Veechikal, Sooryamsuvoro Vayalpoovilum, etc. In 2021, he received the Kerala Sahitya Akademi Award for Overall Contributions, and Asan Poetry Prize. He won the 2024 Kendra Sahitya Academi Award for his poetry collection Pingalakeshini.

== Personal life ==
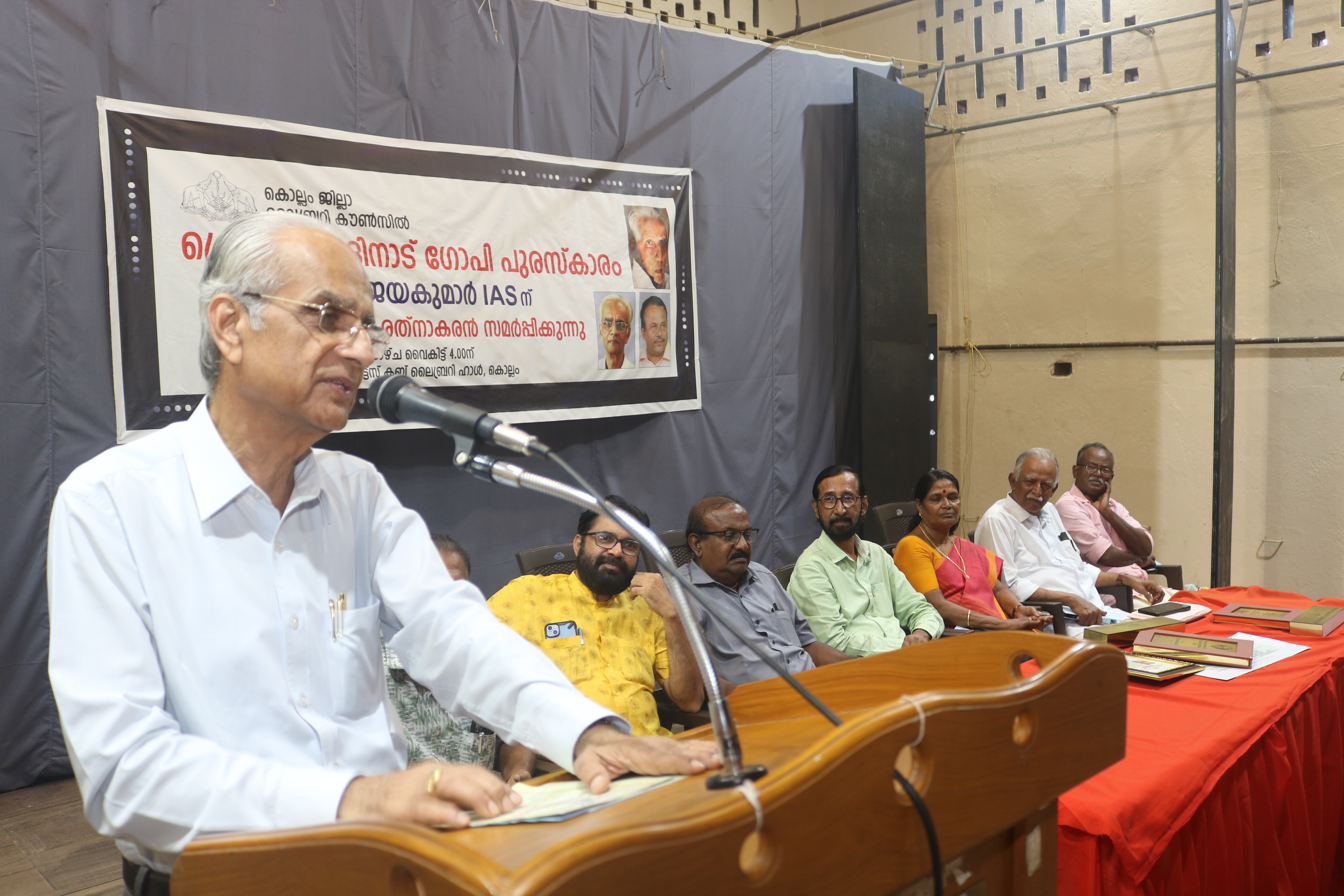
Jayakumar IAS speaking at Prof Adinadu Gopi award at Kollam function 2025

Jayakumar is the eldest son of the late eminent film director M. Krishnan Nair and K. Sulochana Devi. He has two younger brothers, K. Harikumar and K. Sreekumar (K. Sreekuttan), the latter being a popular film director himself. He is married to Meera, and has two children - a son named Anand and a daughter named Aswathi.

== Selected Poems ==
- Santhapavriksham
- Rathriyude Sadhyathakal
- Ardhavrithangal
- Solamante Pranayageethangal
- Rumiyude Pranayakavithakal (translation)
- Geetanjali(translation)

== Other Books ==
- Aadityahridayam
- Aparathayod anuragapoorvam
- Vayalar-Ganarachanyile Gandharvam
- Lalitha Jeevitham

== See also ==
- Thunchath Ezhuthachan Malayalam University
