= Ranjini (actress) =

Indian actress

Ranjani
- Born: Sasha Selvaraj; Singapore
- Occupations: Actor; Lawyer; Entrepreneur; Social activist
- Years active: 1985–1992; 2014–present
- Spouse: Pierre Kombara

Sasha Selvaraj, better known by her stage name Ranjini, is a Singaporean actress known for her roles in Indian cinema, specifically Tamil, Telugu, and Malayalam films. Ranjini made her debut in the 1985 Tamil film Muthal Mariyathai directed by Bharathiraja. In 1987, she acted in Lenin Rajendran's Swathi Thirunal, a biopic on the Travancore ruler of the same name. Her third Malayalam film Chithram (1988), written and directed by Priyadarshan, went on to become a huge box office success and still holds some records in the Malayalam movie industry. Koothara, directed by Srinath Rajendran, marked her return to acting after a hiatus of two decades.

== Career ==
Ranjini was born in Singapore as Sasha to Selvaraj and Lilly, belonging to fourth generation residents of Singapore, with roots from Tirunelveli, Tamil Nadu. She was introduced to films by famous director Bharathiraja, a friend of her father. Bharathiraja gave her the screen name of "Ranjini" for his 1985 film Muthal Mariyathai. Ranjini, whose family was in Singapore then had flown down to Chennai taking a break from studies with the hope that the shooting would get over within two weeks.

Her first Malayalam film was Swathi Thirunal in 1987, a National Film Awards feature directed by Lenin Rajendran. The film was a critical success and she won The Cinema Express Award for Best Actress. She went on to act in Malayalam films like Chithram, Mukunthetta Sumitra Vilikkunnu (1988) and Kottayam Kunjachan (1990). Ranjini quit acting in films at the peak of her career to move to London, where she continued her studies. Her last film was Customs Diary (1993), directed by TS Suresh Babu.

Ranjini was in the committee of "Nirbhaya-Kochi", an initiative of district administration under Ernakulam District Collector, M. G. Rajamanickam IAS (The Welfare for Women & Children Safety) in 2014. She was also in the founding committee of "Stree", a project for Women and Health under Maradu municipality in 2016. She regularly appears as a panelist on TV debates for various social topics on National, Malayalam and Tamil channels. In 2018, she was one of 12 elite panelists invited by The National Commission for Women to a discussion on sexual harassment in the workplace and she head of Hema Committee report.

Ranjini is known for her voice against the Supreme Court verdict on women-entry at Sabarimala. She was also instrumental in stopping TV counselling shows i.e. Nijangal & Solvathellam Unmai.

In 2023, she made her debut in television series through Chandrikayilaliyunna Chandrakantham airing on Asianet.

Ranjini moves High Court of Kerala against the order to release Hema Committee report stating that there is an infringement of hers and others who appeared before the committee of their confidentiality and privacy and they have the legal right to see this report and asking to give their consent for the publication.

== Personal life ==
She married Malayali businessman Pierre Kombara. In London, she also did a degree in credit management and later acquired a law degree. She also worked for the BBC for a short time. She is a graduate lawyer and is currently working as a joint director in an overseas education institution in Kochi, Kerala.

Ranjini is also an avid wildlife and environmental activist.

== Filmography ==
=== Tamil films ===
Year	Film	Character	Notes
1985	Mudhal Mariyathai	Sevuli	Tamil debut
1986	Avalai Cholli Kutramillai		
1986	Kadalora Kavithaigal	Gangamma	
1986	Aayiram Pookkal Malarattum	Saras	
1986	Paru Paru Pattanam Paru		
1986	Needhana Andha Kuyil		
1986	Nalellam Pournami		
1986	Mannukkul Vairam	Chittu	
1987	Kudumbam Oru Koyil		
1987	Aayusu Nooru	Azhagammal	
1987	Paasam Oru Vesham		
1987	Muthukkal Moondru	Marie	
1987	Parisam Pottachu		
1987	Arul Tharum Ayyappan		
1987	Velicham		
1988	Thaimel Aanai	Meena	
1988	Urimai Geetham	Ganga	
1989	Puthu Mappillai		
1989	Poruthadhu Podhum	Rosy	
1989	Neruppu Nila		
1989	Sariyana Jodi		
1989	Dilli Babu		
1989	Sakalakala Sammandhi	Jhansi	
1989	Ellame En Thangachi		
1989	Samsarame Saranam		
1990	Kalyana Rasi	Sulochana alias Myna	
1991	Sir...I Love You	Lalitha	
1991	En Mamanukku Nalla Manasu		

=== Malayalam films ===
Year	Film	Character	Notes
1987	Swathi Thirunal	Sugandhavalli	Her debut film in Malayalam
1988	Chithram	Kalyani	
1988	Mukunthetta Sumitra Vilikkunnu	Sumitra	
1988	Adholokam		
1989	Varnam	Ammu	
1989	News	Megha	
1989	Kaalal Pada	Maya Menon	
1990	Kauthuka Varthakal	Rose Mary	
1990	Rajavazhcha	Mini	
1990	Anantha Vruthantham	Lateesha	
1990	Prosecution	Jyothi	
1990	Orukkam	Radha	
1990	Mukham	Usha	
1990	Nanma Niranjavan Srinivasan	Mary	
1990	Pavakkooth	Krishna	
1990	Thooval Sparsam	Sujatha	
1990	Khandakavyam		
1990	Kashandikku Marumarunnu		
1990	Vacation		
1990	Sandram	Police Officer's wife	
1990	Sunday 7 PM	Dilip's stepmother/Dilip's lover	
1990	Kottayam Kunjachan	Mollykkutty	
1990	Vembanad	Abused/Lead role	
1991	Agni Nilavu	Rekha	
1992	Kingini	Nandhini	
2008	Twenty:20 (film)	Ranjini	Archive footage
2014	Ring Master	Elizabeth	Comeback film
2014	Koothara	Ram's mother	
2016	Pa Va	Lillykutty	
2018	Mohanlal	Herself	Photo only /Archive footage/Uncredited role
2019	Thankabhasmakuriyittu Thampuratti	Herself	Photo only /Archive footage/Uncredited role

=== Telugu ===
Year	Film	Role	Notes
1986	Brahma Rudrulu	Jyothi	
1988	August 15 Raatri	Sheela	
1988	Maa Inti Maharaju		
1989	Police Report	Lakshmi	
1989	Paape Maa Pranam	Mary	

=== Kannada ===
Year	Film	Character
1987	Agni Kanye	

== Television ==
=== Shows ===
Year	Program	Role	Channel	Language
2014	Lunars Comedy Express	Judge	Asianet Plus	Malayalam
2014	Comedy Stars Season 2	Judge	Asianet	Malayalam
2014	Gruhalakshmi	Judge	Jaihind TV	Malayalam
2014	Patturumaal	Judge	Kairali TV	Malayalam
2014	Veruthey Alla Bharya	Judge	Mazhavil Manorama	Malayalam
2015	Yuvatharam	Judge	Jaihind TV	Malayalam
2017	Malayali Veettamma	Judge	Flowers TV	Malayalam
2018	Makkal Mandram	Panelist	Thanthi TV	Tamil
2019-2020	Sharp Shoot	Debate Moderator	Jaihind TV	Malayalam
2022	Flowers Oru Kodi	Participant	Flowers TV	Malayalam
2022	Red Carpet	Mentor	Amrita TV	Malayalam
2024	Star Magic	Mentor	Flowers TV	Malayalam
2024	News Hour	Panelist	Asianet News	Malayalam

=== Soap Opera ===
Year	Program	Role	Channel	Language
2023-2025	Chandrikayilaliyunna Chandrakantham	Arundhati Devi Amma	Asianet	Malayalam

=== Beauty pageants as judge ===
- Miss India/Kerala 2010 (Miss World-Femina)
- Miss South India 2012 (Miss Asia-Manappuram)
- Mrs. Malayali 2019
