= Gautami =

Indian actress and politician (born 1968)

Gautami Tadimalla
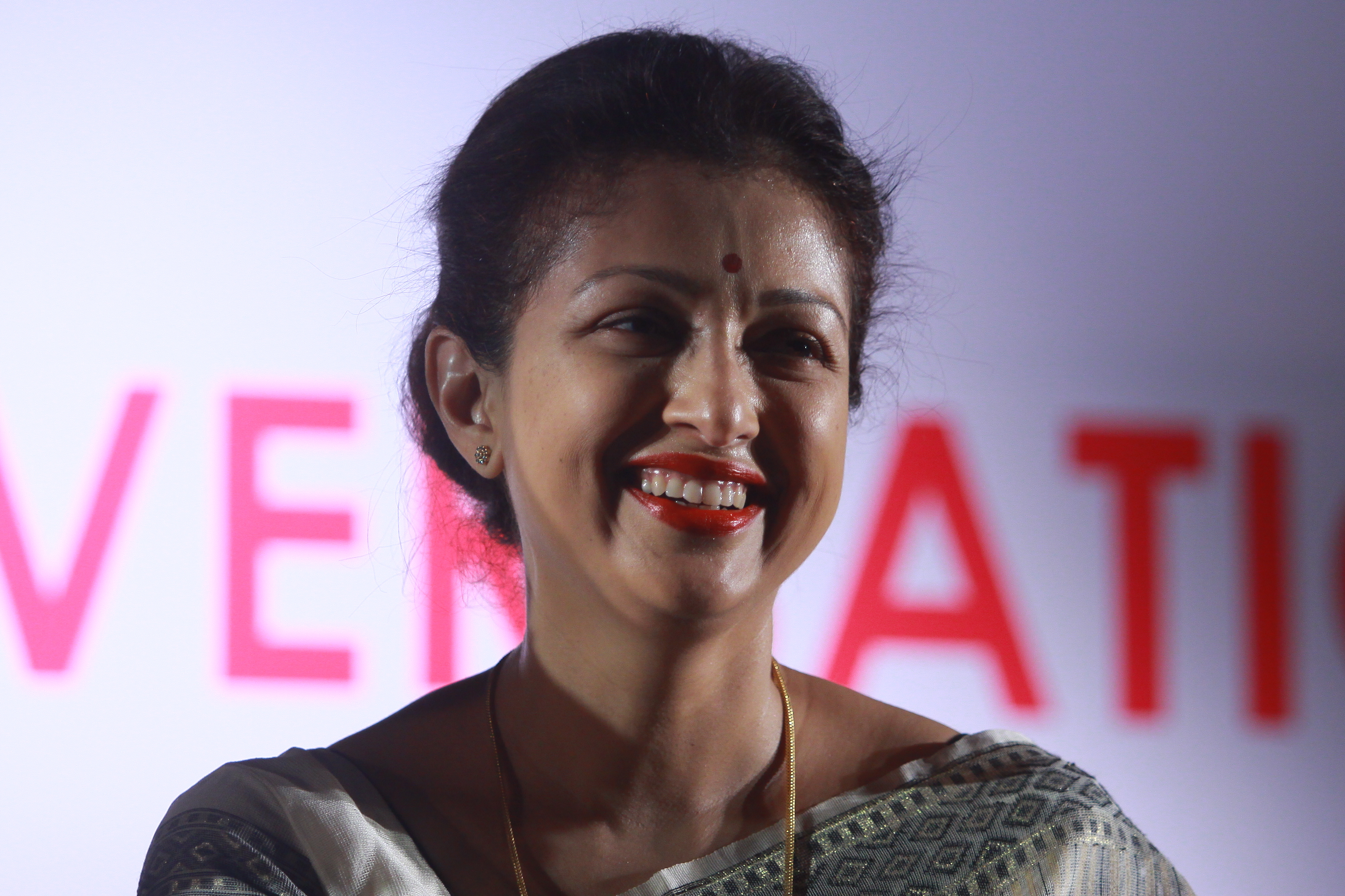
- Gautami in 2013

Deputy Propaganda Secretary of the All India Anna Dravida Munnetra Kazhagam
- In office 21 October 2024 – 14 June 2026
- General Secretary: Edappadi K. Palaniswami
- Propaganda Secretary: M. Thambidurai

Personal details
- Born: Gautami Tadimalla; 2 July 1968 (age 58) Ichchapuram, Srikakulam, Andhra Pradesh, India
- Party: All India Anna Dravida Munnetra Kazhagam (2024–14 June 2026)
- Other political affiliations: Bharatiya Janata Party (1997–2023)
- Spouse: Sandeep Bhatia (m. 1998; div. 1999)
- Domestic partner(s): Kamal Haasan (2005–2016)
- Children: 1
- Relatives: Soumya Bollapragada (niece)
- Education: GITAM University, Visakhapatnam
- Occupation: Actress; Social worker; Costume Designer; Politician
- Website: gautamitadimalla.com

Gautami Tadimalla (born 2 July 1968), known mononymously as Gautami, is an Indian actress, costume designer, social worker, politician and former deputy Propaganda Secretary of All India Anna Dravida Munnetra Kazhagam. She has worked mainly in Tamil and Telugu cinema, in addition to Malayalam, Hindi, and Kannada films. She has received numerous accolades, including a Nandi Award, a Filmfare Award and three Tamil Nadu State Film Awards for her acting as well as costume designing.

Gautami made her first credited appearance in 1987 in the Telugu film, Dayamayudu, directed by her cousin Vijayachandar. Her first leading role, in the same year, came with Gandhinagar Rendava Veedhi, in addition to her Kannada film debut, Elu Suttina Kote. Further, she expanded to Tamil cinema with her debut in Guru Sishyan (1988) which emerged highly successful at the box-office. She continued to feature in several successful films such as Enga Ooru Kavalkaran (1988), Enga Ooru Mappillai (1989), Apoorva Sagodharargal (1989). In 1990, she won Tamil Nadu State Film Award Special Prize for her performance in Namma Ooru Poovatha and debuted in Malayalam cinema with the successful film, His Highness Abdullah. Further box-office hits included the dramas Dharma Durai, Nee Pathi Naan Pathi (both 1991), Chikkejamanru and Thevar Magan (both 1992). Her first Hindi cinema appearance was in Pyar Hua Chori Chori (1991).

Besides her acting career in films, Gautami is a television actress, television host, the founder of Life Again Foundation and a costume designer in films. Her most notable costume designing have been in films Dasavathaaram (2008) and Vishwaroopam (2017).

== Personal life ==
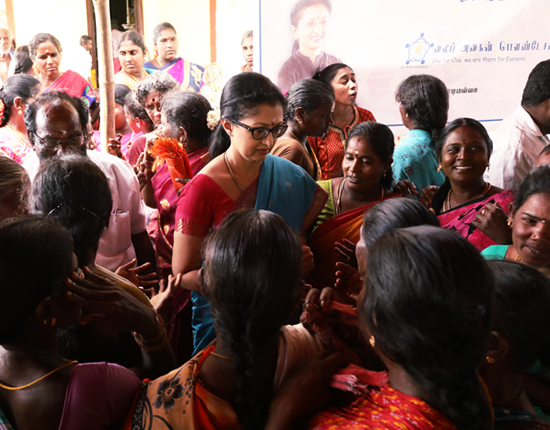
Gautami in Life Again Foundation Charity Work

Gautami was born into a Telugu family from Srikakulam, Andhra Pradesh, to T. R. Seshagiri Rao and Vasundhara Devi. Her father was a radiation oncologist, while her mother was a pathologist and diagnostician. She studied at Bishop Cotton Girls' School in Bengaluru. During her childhood, she also lived in Visakhapatnam and Kerala.

Gautami married Sandeep Bhatia, a businessman, in 1998, and the couple have a daughter, Subbulakshmi born in 1999. They got divorced in 1999.

Gautami was in a relationship with actor Kamal Haasan from 2005 till 2016. In 2016, Gautami announced on her blog that she had ended her relationship with him. Gautami wrote on her blog: "It is heartbreaking for me to have to say today that I and Mr. Haasan are no longer together. After almost 13 years together, it has been one of the most devastating decisions that I have ever had to make in my life".

She was diagnosed with breast cancer at the age of 35, and recovered later.

== Film career ==
Gautami attended GITAM University in Visakhapatnam to pursue engineering. She made her film debut with the Telugu film Dayamayudu (1987), which was produced by her cousin. She later appeared in films such as Gandhinagar Rendava Veedhi and Srinivasa Kalyanam (both 1987).

She was then introduced to Tamil cinema with Guru Shishyan (1988), starring Rajinikanth and Prabhu. Gautami was most active in Tamil cinema between 1987 and 1998.

Her notable performances in Malayalam films include His Highness Abdullah (1990) with Mohanlal, Daddy (1992) with Arvind Swami Dhruvam (1993) with Mammootty and Ayalathe Adheham (1993) with Jayaram. Her role in Sukrutham (1994) was penned by the writer M. T. Vasudevan Nair. She has acted also in Kannada films Elu Suttina Kote (1987), Chikkejamanru (1992), Cheluva (1997), and in the Hindi movies, Pyar Hua Chori Chori (1991), Aadmi (1993), Janta Ki Adalat (1994), Trimurti (1995), Dhaal (1997) and Haiwan (1998).

Her notable Tamil movies was Apoorva Sagodharargal (1989), Raja Chinna Roja (1989), Panakkaran (1990), Ooru Vittu Ooru Vanthu (1990), Namma Ooru Poovatha (1990), Dharma Durai (1991), Nee Pathi Naan Pathi (1991), Rickshaw Mama (1992), Thevar Magan (1992), Honest Raj (1994), Nammavar (1994), Kuruthipunal (1995) as well as Mani Ratnam's Iruvar (1997).

She made a guest appearance in the song "Chikku Bukku Railu" with Prabhu Deva in the film Gentleman (1993). Her film Sasanam, featuring Arvind Swami, released in 2006, but it was shot in 1996. She played the lead in the Tamil serial Indira. She had hosted a talk show in Sun TV titled Anbudan. She acted in the serial Abirami which was telecast on Kalaignar TV. She made a comeback to the film industry in the late 2000s as a costume designer for films starring her partner Kamal Haasan. She went on to style several of her other films, including Vishwaroopam (2013) and Uttama Villain (2015).

After sixteen years, she returned to acting, by starring in the Tamil film Papanasam (2015), in which she was paired with her partner Kamal Haasan, remake of the original Malayalam film, Drishyam. She made a comeback to Malayalam cinema after 14 years in the horror thriller E (2017), playing the lead role.

== Political career ==
=== BJP (1997–2023) ===
Gautami was a member of the BJP from 1997 to 2023. She was BJYM vice president. She joined the party in 1997 under the leadership of LK Advani. She extensively campaigned for Atal Bihari Vajpayee during that period in Andhra, Karnataka and Tamil Nadu. She took a break from politics after her daughter was born. She is back into BJP in 2017. In 2021, she was appointed as in-charge of the Rajapalayam Assembly constituency. On 23 October 2023, she quit BJP, claiming that the party's senior members have been helping a person who has swindled her off her properties.

=== AIADMK (2024–14 June 2026) ===
On 14 February 2024, She joined the All India Anna Dravida Munnetra Kazhagam in the presence of its general secretary Edappadi K. Palaniswami. On 21 October 2024, She was appointed as the Deputy Propaganda Secretary of the AIADMK.

== Charity work ==
Gautami founded Life Again Foundation (LAF) to help cancer patients. Life Again Foundation has conducted more than 360 motivational camps for cancer patients, cancer awareness campaigns, and food drives. It also conducts Yoga and Alternative Therapy programs. It also periodically conducts health camps to conduct tests that screen for cancer and overall health. LAF also runs 2 Mobile hospitals. It also sponsors under-privileged students for higher education. It runs Supplementary Education Centres and Vocational Training Centres.

== Awards and honours ==
| Year | Award category | Awarded work | Ref |
|---|---|---|---|
| 1990 | Tamil Nadu State Film Award Special Prize | Namma Ooru Poovatha | |
| 1991 | Filmfare Award for Best Actress – Tamil | Nee Pathi Naan Pathi | |
| 1991 | Cinema Express Awards for Special Best Tamil Actress | Nee Pathi Naan Pathi | |
| 1991 | Nandi Award for Best Supporting Actress | Chakravyuham | |
| 1994 | Ramu Kaaryatt Award for Best Actress-Malayalam | Sukrutham | |
| 2009 | Vijay Award for Best Costume Designer | Dasavathaaram | |
| 2017 | Tamil Nadu State Film Award for Best Costume Designer | Vishwaroopam | |
| 2015 | Tamil Nadu State Film Award for Best Character Artiste (Female) | Papanasam | |
