= Swaminathan (name) =

Swaminathan (born 1959), is an Indian actor and comedian

Swaminathan is also a given name and surname. Notable people with the name include:

== Politicians and lawyers ==
- Ammu Swaminathan (1894–1978), Indian politician
- D. M. Swaminathan (born 1945), Sri Lankan lawyer
- G. R. Swaminathan (born 1968), Indian judge
- Govind Swaminadhan (1909–2003), Indian lawyer
- R. V. Swaminathan, Indian politician
- T. Swaminathan, Indian politician
- V. V. Swaminathan, Indian politician and statesman

== Military personnel ==
- Krishna Swaminathan, Indian Navy officer
- Lakshmi Sahgal (born Lakshmi Swaminathan; 1914–2012), Indian revolutionary
- Rajaram Swaminathan, Indian Navy officer

== Academics ==
- Anand Swaminathan, Indian-American researcher and academic
- K. Swaminathan (1896–1994), Indian literary scholar
- M. S. Swaminathan (1925–2023), Indian agronomist, agricultural scientist, geneticist, administrator and humanitarian
- Madhavan Swaminathan, Indian-American electrical engineer
- Mina Swaminathan (1933–2022), Indian educationalist
- Padmini Swaminathan, Indian feminist economist
- Soumya Swaminathan (born 1959), Indian Indian paediatrician and clinical scientist
- Thenkachi Ko. Swaminathan (1946–2009), Indian orator
- Venkat Swaminathan, Indian writer and literary critic
- Swaminathan Sivaram (born 1946), Indian chemist

== Artists ==
- Jagdish Swaminathan (1928–1994), Indian painter
- Kalpakam Swaminathan (1922–2011), Indian musician
- Nithilan Saminathan (born Nithilan Swaminathan), Indian film director and screenwriter

== Other ==
- Swaminathan Gurumurthy (born 1949), Indian activist
- Swaminathan Janakiraman, Indian banker
- Kalpana Swaminathan (born 1956), Indian writer
- Komal Swaminathan (1935–1995), Indian activist
- S. Sadanand (born Swaminathan Sadanand; 1900–1953), Indian journalist
- Soumya Swaminathan (chess player) (born 1989), Indian chess player
