= Agraharathil Kazhutai =

1977 film by John Abraham

- Title card
- Directed by: John Abraham
- Written by: Venkat Swaminathan
- Produced by: Charly John; John Abraham
- Starring: M. B. Sreenivasan; Swathi
- Cinematography: Ramachandra Babu
- Edited by: Ravi
- Music by: M. B. Sreenivasan
- Production company: Nirmithi Films
- Release date: 1977
- Running time: 96 minutes
- Country: India
- Language: Tamil

Agraharathil Kazhutai (transl. Donkey in the Brahmin village) is a 1977 Indian Tamil-language film directed by John Abraham and written by Venkat Swaminathan. Inspired by Robert Bresson's French film Au hasard Balthazar (1966), the film stars M. B. Sreenivasan and Swathi. It revolves around a donkey which faces ridicule when brought to a Brahmin village.

Agraharathil Kazhutai won the National Film Award for Best Tamil Feature Film. Though the film courted controversy as it was perceived as hurting Brahmin sentiments, and was largely shunned during its initial release, it attained cult status in later years.

== Plot ==
In Madras, a female donkey is killed by a group of people. Her orphaned foal walks into the house of Narayanaswami, a Brahmin college professor. Sympathetic after learning what happened, Narayanaswami decides to raise the foal and names it 'Chinna'. Due to adopting a donkey, Narayanaswami faces ridicule in his neighbourhood and college. The principal feels this is affecting the college's reputation, and asks Narayanaswami to remedy the situation. Instead, Narayanaswami resigns and leaves with Chinna for his Agraharam (Brahmin village).

After Narayanaswami's arrival at the village, his parents are surprised at his idea to care for a foal. However, Narayanaswami convinces his father, and a deaf-mute girl Uma working as their maid is assigned to take care of Chinna. Narayanaswami returns to Madras for work. The village's other residents start criticising the idea of raising a foal in the Brahmin village. A gang of mischievous boys in the village take to harmful pranks, framing Chinna for actions they have orchestrated.

When Narayanaswami returns some months later, his father mentions the incidents involving Chinna and how the neighbours are constantly complaining. Narayanaswami's brother Venkat shifts to the village with his wife, who becomes upset by the foal's presence in the house. To keep the peace, Narayanaswami takes Chinna away, pays Uma to take care of it, and returns to Madras.

While taking Chinna to the fields, Uma encounters a worker who sexually exploits her multiple times and she soon becomes pregnant. The worker disappears, abandoning Uma. Chinna has now matured. Narayanaswami returns to the village after some months, and sees a pregnant Uma. She informs him that the temple priest was injured because of Chinna; as a result, the villagers, headed by Srinivasa Iyer, sent it to a washerman. Narayanaswami goes to see Chinna, then leaves for Madras.

Uma's baby is stillborn; her mother leaves it at the mountain temple to conceal Uma's identity as the baby's unmarried mother. The temple priest finds the corpse and calls the other villagers, claiming this has diluted the temple's sanctity. Iyer suspects the baby is Uma's, and questions her mother about this. Uma's mother, frightened, confirms the suspicions, but lies that Chinna brought it to the temple. Iyer and the villagers become infuriated with the donkey, and it is stoned and beaten to death.

The village astrologer announces that, because of the sin of killing the donkey, the village will be haunted by omens. Instead, however, miracles begin happening in the village. Iyer's long lost son returns; a paralysed woman starts walking; Venkat's wife becomes pregnant after being unable to conceive for years. On returning, Narayanaswami learns about these happenings. People superstitiously believe that the deceased donkey is responsible for all the miracles and Iyer suggests constructing a temple for the donkey, to which everyone agrees.

Narayanaswami finds Uma. Both search for Chinna's skeleton and find its skull. By then, the villagers arrive, pick up the skull and give a ritual funeral to Chinna by burning the skull, but the fire spreads and engulfs the whole village. Narayanaswami and Uma are the only survivors.

== Cast ==
- M. B. Sreenivasan as Narayanaswami
- Swathi as Uma
- Sreelalitha
- Gopali
- Raman as Venkat
- Veeraraghavan as Srinivasa Iyer
- Narasimhan
- Thillai Rajan
- Krishnaraj
- Rajan

== Production ==
Agraharathil Kazhutai is John Abraham's second directorial venture after the 1971 Malayalam film Vidhyarthikale Ithile Ithile, and only one in Tamil. The idea for Agraharathil Kazhutai came to Abraham when he was staying in Coimbatore for some screenwriting work. While walking through a Brahmin village, he noticed some donkeys and foals, and wondered why people never raise donkey foals as pets, leading to the film's conception. Abraham also took inspiration from Robert Bresson's French film Au hasard Balthazar (1966). Principal photography lasted roughly 30 working days; locations included Loyola College and Kundrathur near Chengalpattu. M. B. Sreenivasan, the lead actor, also composed the music.

Abraham and his team struggled to get the skull of a donkey for the shoot. They searched for skulls in veterinary hospitals and colleges, to no avail. One of Abraham's friends suggested making a fake skull using gypsum plaster, but Abraham disagreed. Eventually, one of his friends mentioned burying a donkey three days before. The team went to the spot, exhumed the donkey's carcass and cut off the head which was yet to decay. After removing the skin, leaving only the skull, they cleaned it up and used it for the shoot. The film took five years to complete.

== Reception ==
Agraharathil Kazhutai received international acclaim. In 1978, Agraharathil Kazhutai won the National Film Award for Best Tamil Feature Film at the 25th National Film Awards. The jury noted John's usage of the verses of Tamil poet Subramania Bharati "for creating a parable set against the orthodoxies and superstitions of a Brahmin village community". It was screened under the Indian Panorama section of the International Film Festival of India in 1978. Along with a few other films, it pioneered the "new wave" movement in South Indian cinema. The film became controversial as it was perceived as hurting Brahmin sentiments, and many Brahmin organisations called for its banning. In 1989, Doordarshan was forced to cancel a scheduled telecast of the film to avoid controversy. Though largely shunned during its initial release, it attained cult status in later years. The film gave a much needed breakthrough for John Abraham. In 2013, IBN Live included it among the 100 greatest films of all-time in Indian cinema.

== Bibliography ==
- Baskaran, S. Theodore (1996). The Eye of the Serpent: An Introduction to Tamil Cinema. Chennai: East West Books. OCLC 243920437.
- Rajadhyaksha, Ashish; Willemen, Paul (1998) [1994]. Encyclopaedia of Indian Cinema. British Film Institute and Oxford University Press. ISBN 0-19-563579-5.
- Dhananjayan, G. (2014). Pride of Tamil Cinema: 1931–2013. Blue Ocean Publishers. OCLC 898765509.
