= Madhu Muttam =

Indian screenwriter (born 1951)

Madhu Muttom
- Born: Madhu K. Panicker; 1 August 1951 (age 74); Muttom, Haripad, Kerala
- Occupation: Script writer
- Years active: 1988–present

Madhu Muttom is an Indian screenwriter from Kerala.

== Life ==
Madhu got his start with Fazil's Kakkothikkavile Appooppan Thaadikal (1986).

His best known film as a screenwriter is Manichitrathazhu (1993) directed by Fazil, for which he also wrote some of the songs. It was remade in Kannada as Apthamitra (2004) and in Tamil as Chandramukhi (2005) both directed by P. Vasu, in Bengali as Rajmohol (2005) directed by Swapan Saha and finally in Hindi as Bhool Bhulaiyaa (2007) directed by Priyadarshan. Madhu has been credited as the sole writer for these remakes after he filed a copyright suit against Fazil when the latter started being listed as the writer of the original script in the remakes. The story is inspired by a tragedy that happened in an Ezhava tharavad, the Alummoottil meda (an old traditional mansion) located at Muttom (near Haripad), belonging to a central Travancore Channar family, in the 19th century. The inheritor of the Alummoottil property and his domestic worker girl were murdered by the son-in-law after he had been written-off due to the marumakkathayam system of inheritance prevalent in Kerala at the time. The murder gave rise to many local legends which serve as the basis for the film. Madhu himself belongs to this Alummoottil tharavad. "Vijanaveedhi", a Malayalam horror novel by Aswathi Thirunal, has been listed by some as an inspiration for the film, though director Fazil and Madhu both deny this.

Bharathan Effect (2007), for which he wrote the screenplay, is the second venture by the director Anil Das who debuted with Sargavasantham in 1995.

Madhu is unmarried and currently lives alone in his native village of Muttom in Haripad.

== Filmography ==
Year	Film	Director	Notes
1986	Ennennum Kannettante	Fazil	Story
1988	Kakkothikkavile Appooppan Thaadikal	Kamal	Story
1993	Manichitrathazhu	Fazil	Story; Screenplay; Dialogues
1998	Harikrishnans	Fazil	Dialogues
2007	Bharathan Effect	Anil Das	Story; Screenplay; Dialogues
2011	Kanakompathu	Mahadevan	Story; Screenplay; Dialogues
