= Ramachandra Babu =

Indian cinematographer (1947–2019)

K. Ramachandra Babu
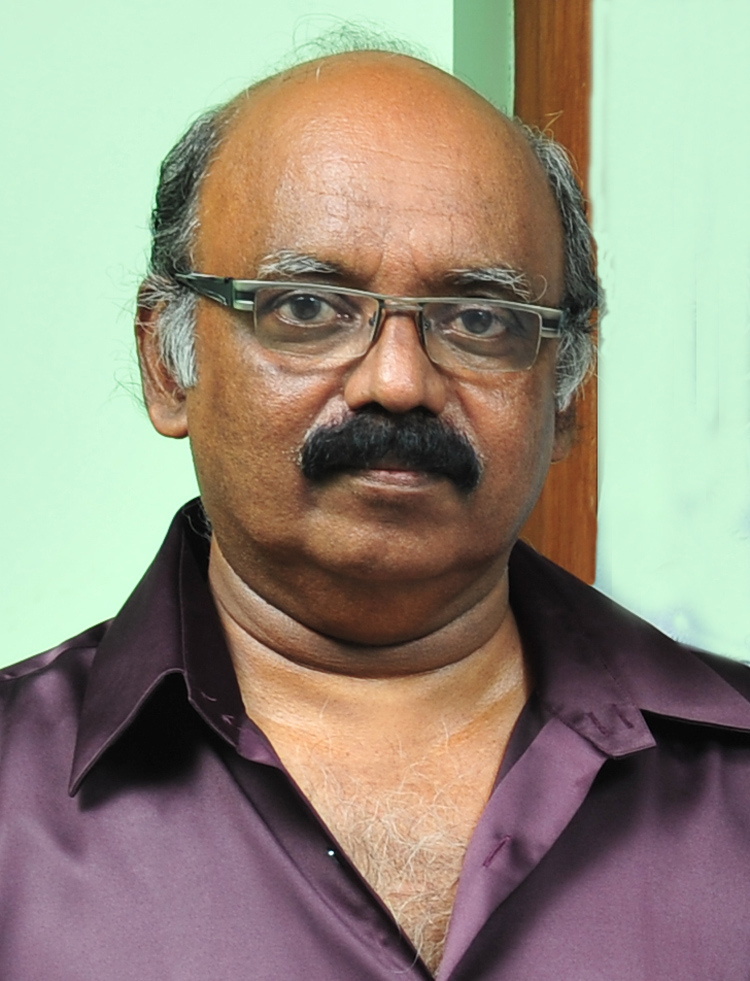
- Born: 15 December 1947; Maduranthakam, Tamil Nadu, India
- Died: 21 December 2019 (aged 72)
- Education: Loyola College, Chennai; FTII
- Occupation: Cinematographer
- Years active: 1971–2019
- Spouse: K. Lathika Rani
- Relatives: Ravi K. Chandran (brother)
- Awards: Kerala State Film Award for Best Cinematography 1976 – Dweep; 1978 – Rathinirvedam; 1980 – Chamaram; 1989 – Oru Vadakkan Veeragadha
- Website: www.ramachandrababu.com

Kunjan Ramachandra Babu ISC (15 December 1947 – 21 December 2019) was an Indian cinematographer of over 125 films, most of which are Malayalam films. He also worked for films in Tamil, Telugu, Hindi, Arabic and English languages. He served as the cinematographer for several documentaries and advertisement films as well. He was one of the founding members of the Indian Society of Cinematographers (ISC).

== Early life and career ==
Ramachandra Babu was born on 15 December 1947 in Maduranthakam at Chengalpattu District, Tamil Nadu, as the eldest son of Malayali parents, Kunjan Pillai and Padmini Amma, both from Alappuzha, Kerala. After obtaining his B.Sc. (Chemistry) degree from Loyola College, Madras in 1966, he went on to join the Film and Television Institute of India, Pune to study cinematography. At the Institute, he made friends with Balu Mahendra, John Abraham and K. G. George, who would go on to become noted film directors.

He made his feature film debut in 1971 as a cinematographer even before completing his FTII course, for Vidyarthikale Ithile Ithile.

== Later career ==
Ramachandra Babu's first colour film (Eastman Color) was Dweepu (1977), directed by Ramu Kariat. It won him his first Kerala State Film Award for Best Cinematography. He went on to win 3 more State Awards for Rathinirvedam (1978) and Chamaram (1980), directed by Bharathan, and Oru Vadakkan Veeragadha (1989), directed by Hariharan.

He played a prominent role in ushering in the technical advancements in cinematography into Malayalam cinema. The transition from Black & White to colour aside, he served as the cinematographer for the first CinemaScope film to be shot in South India, Alavuddinum Athbutha Vilakkum (1979), directed by I. V. Sasi. Despite featuring major stars like Kamal Haasan, Rajinikanth and Jayabharathi, the film was delayed and another CinemaScope film Thacholi Ambu (1978) was released ahead of it, leaving the latter to be considered as the first CinemaScope film in South India. He was the cinematographer of the first film to be released with 70 mm film in Malayalam. The film, Padayottam (1982), directed by Jijo Punnoose, was from the production house of Thacholi Ambu, Navodaya. The film was photographed in CinemaScope format and was converted to 70 mm blow-up prints with 6-track magnetic stereo sound during post-production.

His noted films include Nirmalyam (1973 – National Award For Best Feature Film, directed by M. T. Vasudevan Nair), Swapnadanam (1975 – Kerala State Film Award for Best Film, directed by K. G. George), Bandhanam (1978 – Kerala State Best Film, directed by M. T. Vasudevan Nair), Agraharathil Kazhuthai (1978 – Best Tamil Film – National Award, directed by John Abraham), Sandhyakku Virinja Poovu directed by P.G. Viswambharan, Itha Ivide Vare directed by I. V. Sasi), Patita (1980 – Hindi, directed by I. V. Sasi), Yavanika (directed by K. G. George) & Marmaram (directed by Bharathan), both Kerala State Best Film Award – 1982, Padayottam (first Malayalam 70 mm feature film, 1982, directed by Jijo), Pagal Nilavu (1985 – Tamil, directed by Mani Rathnam), Oru Vadakkan Veera Gaadha (1989 – Malayalam, directed by Hariharan), Aadhaaram (1992 – Malayalam, directed by George Kithu), Sallapam (1996 – Malayalam, directed by Sunder Das), Ghazal (1993 – Malayalam, directed by Kamal), Kanmadam (1998 – Malayalam, directed by Lohithadas), Beyond the Soul (English – 2003 – directed by Rajiv Anchal) and Al-Boom (Arabic – 2005 – directed by Khaled Abdul Raheem Al-Zadjali).

== Awards ==
- Kerala State Film Award for Best Cinematography
  - 1976 – Dweepu
  - 1978 – Rathinirvedam
  - 1980 – Chamaram
  - 1989 – Oru Vadakkan Veeragadha
- Kerala Film Critics Award (1981) : Nidhra
- Kerala Film Critics Award (2009) : Kadaksham

== Filmography ==
The list of films for which Ramachandra Babu served as the director of cinematography:

Year	Title	Director	Language
1972	Vidhyarthikale Ithile Ithile	John Abraham	Malayalam
1973	Ragging	N. N. Pisharady	Malayalam
1973	Manassu	Hameed Kakkassery	Malayalam
1973	Nirmalyam	M.T. Vasudevan Nair	Malayalam
1976	Agnipushpam	Jesey	Malayalam
1976	Srishti	K. T. Muhammed	Malayalam
1976	Swapnadanam	K.G. George	Malayalam
1976	Rajankanam	I.V. Sasi	Malayalam
1977	Dweepu	Ramu Kariat	Malayalam
1977	Amme Anupame	K.S. Sethumadhavan	Malayalam
1977	Veedu Oru Swargam	Jesey	Malayalam
1977	Itha Ivide Vare	I.V. Sasi	Malayalam
1977	Sneha Yamuna	A. T. Raghu	Malayalam
1977	Tholireyi Gadichindi	K.S. Rami Reddy	Telugu
1977	Randu Lokam	J. Sasikumar	Malayalam
1977	Agraharathil Kazhuthai	John Abraham	Tamil
1978	Rathinirvedam	Bharathan	Malayalam
1978	Ekakini	G.S. Panicker	Malayalam
1978	Vadakakku Oru Hridayam	I.V. Sasi	Malayalam
1978	Onappudava	K.G. George	Malayalam
1978	Mannu	K.G. George	Malayalam
1978	Bandhanam	M.T. Vasudevan Nair	Malayalam
1978	Udhayam Kizhakkuthanne	P. N. Menon	Malayalam
1978	Nakshathrangale Kaaval	K.S. Sethumadhavan	Malayalam
1979	Allauddinum Albhutha Vilakkum	I.V. Sasi	Malayalam
1979	Allauddinum Arputha Vilakkum	I.V. Sasi	Tamil
1979	Ore Vaanam Ore Bhoomi	I.V. Sasi	Tamil
1979	Devathai	P.N. Menon	Tamil
1979	Ezhamkadalinakkare	I.V. Sasi	Malayalam
1980	Vilkkanundu Swapnangal	M. Azad	Malayalam
1980	Chamaram	Bharathan	Malayalam
1980	Shishirathil Oru Vasantham	Keyar	Malayalam
1980	Patita	I.V. Sasi	Hindi
1980	Mela	K.G. George	Malayalam
1980	Savithiri	Bharathan	Tamil
1981	Nidra	Bharathan	Malayalam
1981	Maniyan Pilla Adhava Maniyan Pilla	Balachandra Menon	Malayalam
1981	Kolangal	K.G. George	Malayalam
1982	Yavanika	K.G. George	Malayalam
1982	Palangal	Bharathan	Malayalam
1982	Aalolam	Mohan	Malayalam
1982	Padayottam	Jijo Punnoose	Malayalam
1982	Marmaram	Bharathan	Malayalam
1982	Vaarikkuzhi	M.T. Vasudevan Nair	Malayalam
1982	Innallenkil Naale	I.V. Sasi	Malayalam
1983	Sandhyakku Virinja Poovu	P.G. Viswambharan	Malayalam
1983	Eettillam	Fazil	Malayalam
1983	Pin Nilavu	P.G. Viswambharan	Malayalam
1983	Sagaram Santham	P.G. Viswambharan	Malayalam
1983	Marakkukila Orikkalum	Fazil	Malayalam
1983	Onnu Chirikku	P.G. Viswambharan	Malayalam
1984	Onnanu Nammal	P.G. Viswambharan	Malayalam
1984	Adaminte Variyellu	K.G. George	Malayalam
1984	Unaroo	Mani Ratnam	Malayalam
1984	Oru Kochukatha Aarum Parayatha Katha	P.G. Viswambharan	Malayalam
1985	Vellarikka Pattanam	Thomas Berly	Malayalam
1985	Paadum Vaanampadi	Jayakumar	Tamil
1985	Pagal Nilavu	Mani Ratnam	Tamil
1985	Ivide Ee Theerathu	P.G. Viswambharan	Malayalam
1985	Ee Lokam Ivide Kure Manushyar	P.G. Viswambharan	Malayalam
1985	Deivathayorthu	R. Gopi	Malayalam
1986	Ithile Iniyum Varu	P.G. Viswambharan	Malayalam
1986	Manthira Punnagai	Thamizh Azhagan	Tamil
1986	Ennu Nathante Nimmi	Sajan	Malayalam
1988	Achuvettante Veedu	Balachandra Menon	Malayalam
1988	Kanakambarangal	N. Sankaran Nair	Malayalam
1988	Puravrutham	Lenin Rajendran	Malayalam
1988	Oozham	Harikumar	Malayalam
1988	Mattoral	K.G. George	Malayalam
1989	Kadhal Enum Nadhiyinile	M.K.I. Sukumaran	Tamil
1989	Oru Vadakkan Veeragatha	Hariharan	Malayalam
1989	Utharam	V. K. Pavithran	Malayalam
1989	Ashokante Aswathikuttikku	Vijayan Karot	Malayalam
1990	Brahma Rakshass	Vijayan Karot	Malayalam
1990	Ee Kannikoodi	K.G. George	Malayalam
1990	Radha Madhavam	Suresh Unnithan	Malayalam
1991	Manamadha Sarangal	Baby	Malayalam
1991	Mukha Chithram	Suresh Unnithan	Malayalam
1991	Kadinjool Kalyanam	Rajasenan	Malayalam
1991	Neelagiri	I.V. Sasi	Malayalam
1991	Irikku M.D. Akathundu	P.G. Viswambharan	Malayalam
1992	Aadharam	George Kithu	Malayalam
1992	Ponnurukkum Pakshi	Vaisakan	Malayalam
1992	Ente Ponnu Thampuran	A. T. Abu	Malayalam
1992	Mukhamudra	Ramasimhan (director)	Malayalam
1992	First Bell	P.G. Viswambharan	Malayalam
1992	Savidham	George Kithu	Malayalam
1992	Soorya Gayathri	P. Anil	Malayalam
1993	Venkalam	Bharathan	Malayalam
1993	Aalavattam	Raju Ambaran	Malayalam
1993	Pravachakan	P.G. Viswambharan	Malayalam
1993	Ghazal	Kamal	Malayalam
1993	Bandhukkal Sathrukkal	Sreekumaran Thampi	Malayalam
1993	Bhoomi Geetham	Kamal	Malayalam
1994	Kudumba Visesham	Anil-Babu	Malayalam
1994	Nandini Oppol	Mohan Kupleri	Malayalam
1994	Gamanam	Sreeprakash	Malayalam
1995	Sargavasantham	Anil Das	Malayalam
1995	Samudhayam	Ambili	Malayalam
1995	Thovala Pookkal	Suresh Unnithan	Malayalam
1996	Sallapam	Sundar Das	Malayalam
1996	Harbour	Anil-Babu	Malayalam
1996	Kunkumacheppu	Thulasidas	Malayalam
1997	Kudamattam	Sundar Das	Malayalam
1997	Karunyam	A.K. Lohithadas	Malayalam
1997	Rishyasringan	Suresh Unnithan	Malayalam
1998	Kanmadam	A.K. Lohithadas	Malayalam
1998	Elavamkodu Desam	K.G. George	Malayalam
1999	Aakasha Ganga	Vinayan	Malayalam
1999	Saaphalyam	G. S. Vijayan	Malayalam
1999	English Medium	Pradeep Chokli	Malayalam
2000	Varnakkazhchakal	Sundar Das	Malayalam
2002	Puthooramputhri Unniyarcha	P.G. Viswambharan	Malayalam
2002	Nakshathrakkannulla Rajakumaran Avanundoru Rajakumari	Rajasenan	Malayalam
2003	Beyond The Soul	Rajiv Anchal	English
2003	Swapnam Kondu Thulabharam	Rajasenan	Malayalam
2004	Kanninum Kannadikkum	Sundar Das	Malayalam
2004	Agninakshathram	Karim	Malayalam
2005	Kalyana Kurimanam	Udaya Kumar	Malayalam
2005	Udayon	Bhadran	Malayalam
2005	Mayookham	Hariharan	Malayalam
2006	Al Boom	Khalid Al Zadjali	Arabic
2007	Bharathan Effect	Anil Das	Malayalam
2008	Mizhikal Sakshi	Ashok R Nath	Malayalam
2008	Pakal Nakshatrangal	Rajeev Nath	Malayalam
2010	Yugapurushan	R. Sukumaran	Malayalam
2010	Kadaksham	Shashi Paravoor	Malayalam
	Inganayum Oraal	Kabeer Rawther	Malayalam
	Pirate's Blood	Mark Ratering	English
2011	Ven Shankhu Pol	Ashok R Nath	Malayalam

=== Unreleased films ===
1. Professor Dingan (director) - Died during the production

== Other works ==
His memoir is entitled Celluloid Swapnadakan (translation: Celluloid Dreamer).

== Gallery ==
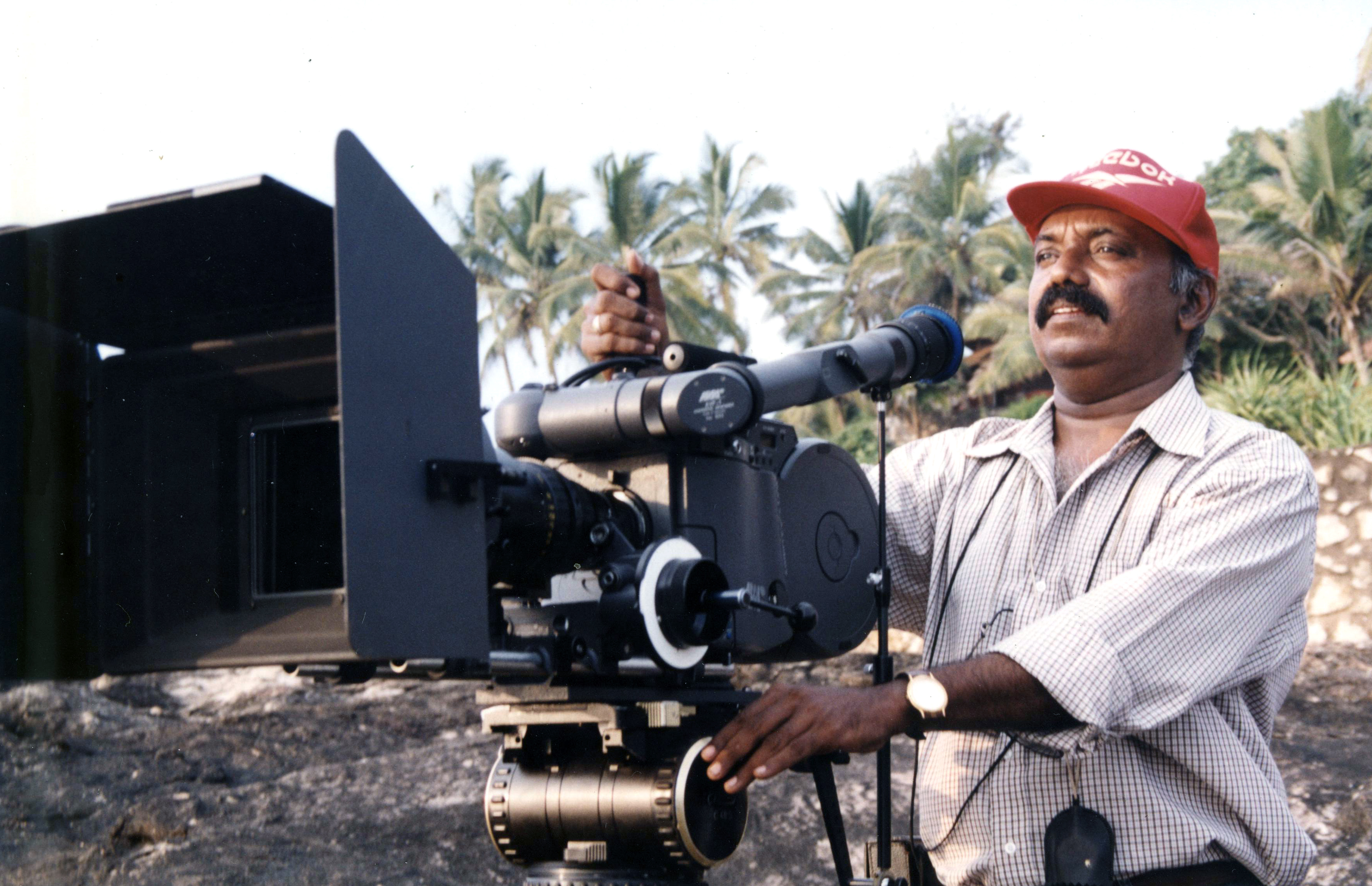
Ramachandra Babu with Arriflex 535 B Camera on the location of the English film Beyond the soul, directed by Rajeev Anchal

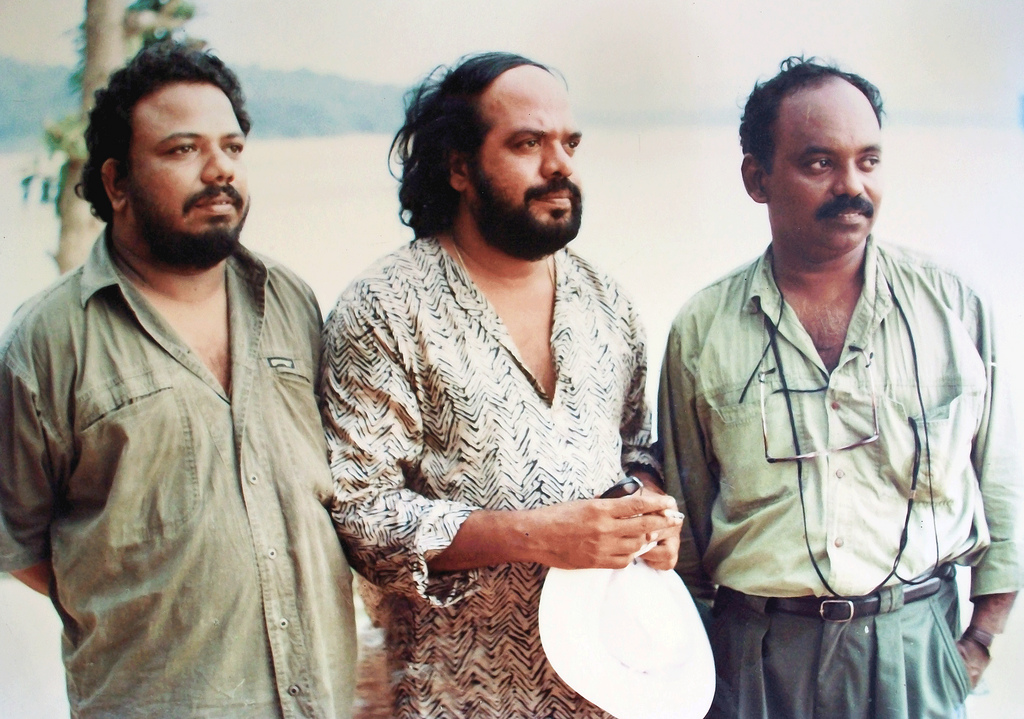
Screenwriter Lohithadas and director Bharathan along with Ramachandra Babu at the location of Venkalam.

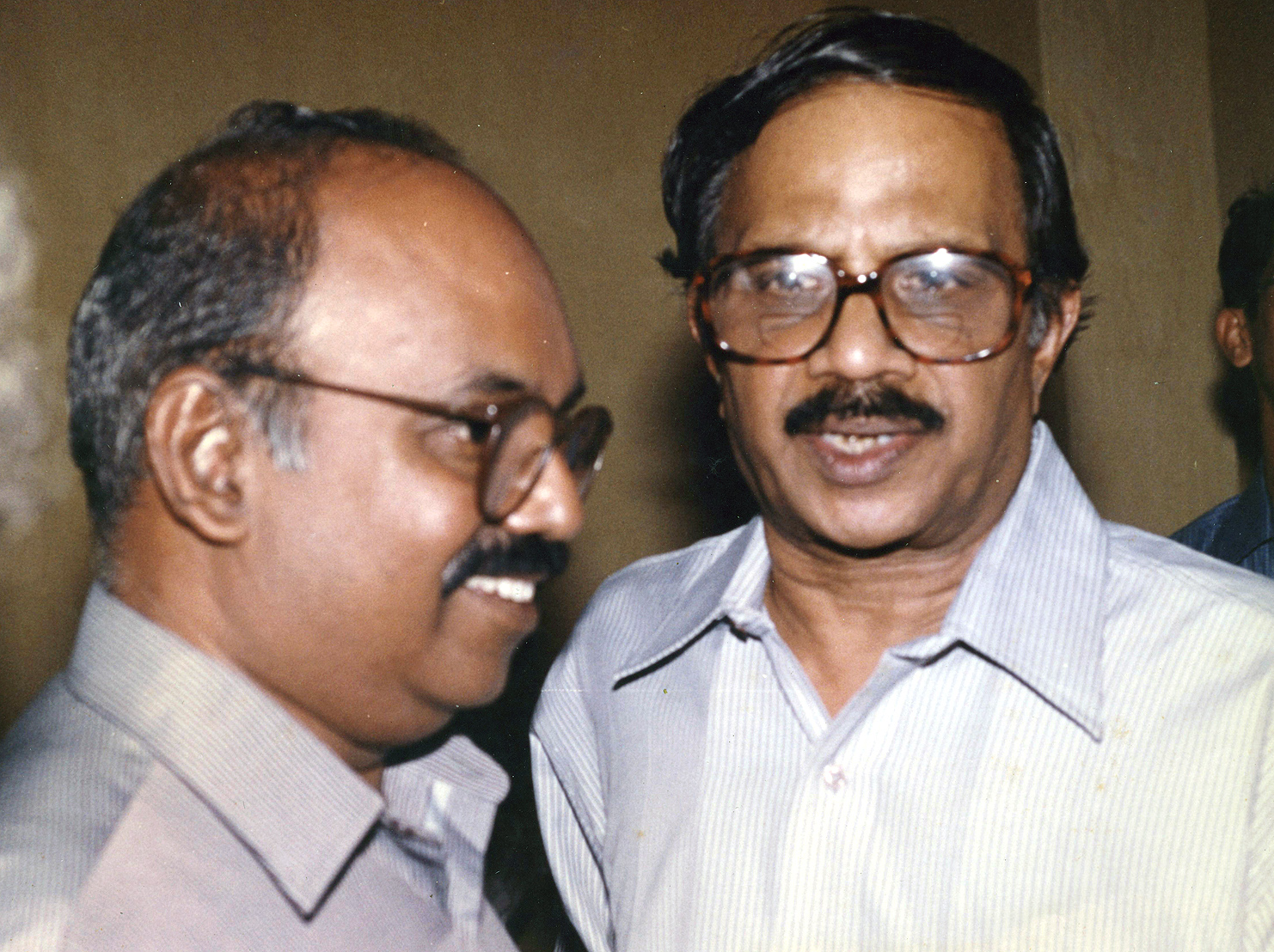
Along with writer M.T. Vasudevan Nair

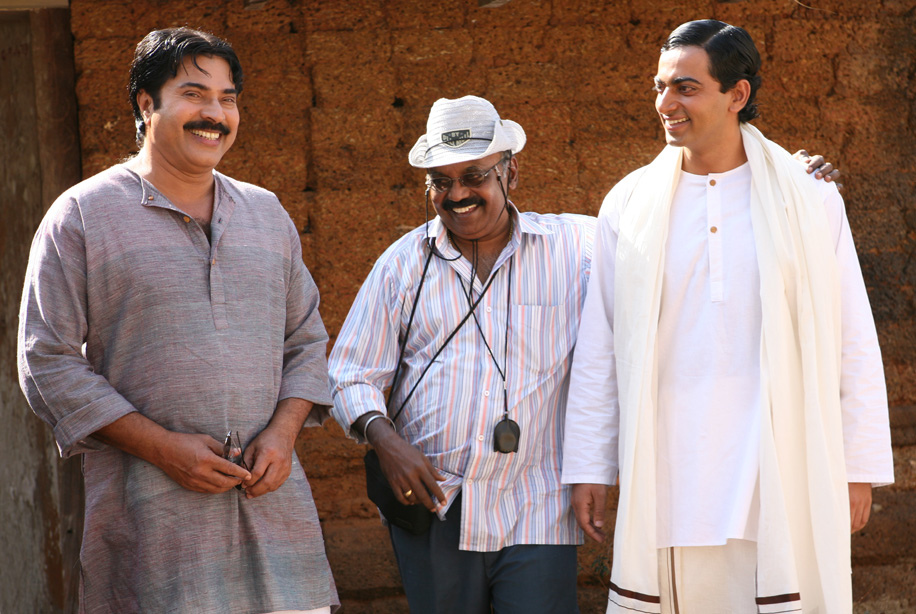
Ramachandra Babu with Mammootty and Saiju Kurup who did their debut films with him.
