= Odessa Sathyan =

Indian filmmaker, activist (1957–2014)

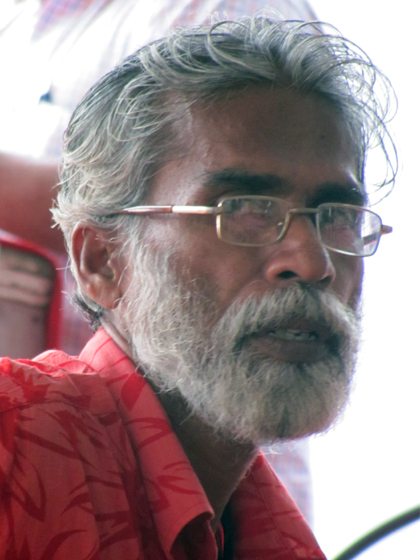
- Born: Cheeram Veetti Sathyan; 10 October 1957; Vatakara, Kerala, India
- Died: 19 August 2014 (aged 56); Kerala, India
- Resting place: Narayana Nagar, Kozhikode, India
- Occupations: Filmmaker, social activist
- Spouse: Jennifer
- Children: 2 daughters
- Awards: Sangeetha Nataka Akademi Award; Special Jury Prize IFFK
- Website: Official web site

Cheeram Veetti Sathyan (10 October 1957 – 19 August 2014), popularly known as Odessa Sathyan was an Indian documentary filmmaker and social activist, known for his involvement in the naxal movements of the seventies in Kerala and his association with Odessa Collective, a people's film movement which was founded by the noted Malayalam filmmaker, John Abraham. He received the Kerala Sangeetha Nataka Akademi award, for his musical documentary Balikurup, a film on Malayalam poet, A. Ayyappan.

== Biography ==
C. V. Sathyan was born on 10 October 1957, at Vatakara, in Kozhikode district, in the South Indian state of Kerala, to Cheeramveettil Kunkan and Cheeru. He was attracted by the leftist movement early on in his life and was associated with the social activism, in the district of Kozhikode, in the 1970s. These activities gathered momentum when he joined the naxalite movement.

The next phase of his life started with his association with the renowned filmmaker John Abraham. Together, they launched Odessa Collective, a people's film movement, which made films such as Amma Ariyan, which gained critical and social acclaim. With John Abraham's death, in 1987, the movement lost its steam but Sathyan tried to carry it forward singlehandedly by founding Odessa Movies and keeping the free public screening of films on with a small projector.

Sathyan was married to Jennifer, a college lecturer, and had two daughters, Sandra and Soya. He died on 19 August 2014, aged 56, succumbing to pancreatic cancer at the Kozhikode Medical College. His body was laid to rest at his residence at Narayana Nagar, Kozhikode.

== Social activism ==
Sathyan's social life was kickstarted by the trade union movements of 1970s, in Kerala, when he got actively involved in many of the leftist activities during that time in Kozhikode. He was reported to have been associated with the trade union strikes at Iringalpara and other areas in Kozhikode. Later, Sathyan joined the naxalite movement and became the Kozhikode district Secretary of the Communist Party of India (Marxist–Leninist) and had to undergo imprisonment during the Emergency period of 1975–77. He was said to be one of the leaders of a people's mass trial, conducted by the CPI ML, at the Kozhikode Medical College Campus.

== Film career ==
The friendship with John Abraham influenced Sathyan to join the Odessa Collective initiative. He participated the activities of the movement and the group, by collecting donations from the public, produced Amma Ariyan, widely regarded as the first people's cinema in India, and exhibited the film all over Kerala, free of charge. With John Abraham's death in 1987, the movement withered but Sathyan established Odessa Movies to carry the activities forward. His active association with the movement earned him the nickname Odessa Sathyan.

Sathyan made five documentaries and a musical album.

- Ithrayum Yathabhagam (The Path Traversed): a documentary on the life and works of noted Malayalam poet, A. Ayyappan. Sathyan's relationship with the poet was widely known and the documentary was the filmmaker's attempt to look at the poet's life from the perspective of an insider.
- Vettayadappetta Manasu (The Haunted Mind) : The documentary narrates the story of Ramachandran Nair, a police officer who made headlines by confessing on killing the Naxalite leader, Varghese.
- Mortuary of Love: A documentary on emotional and carnal natures of love and sexual exploitation of young girls.
- Agnirekha (The Blazing Course): A documentary on the life of Angadippuram Balakriishnan, a Naxal activist hailed as a martyr by the movement.
- Visudha Pashu (The Holy Cow): In the post production stage, under editing.
- Balikurippu (The Sacrificial Note): A musical on the life of the poet, A. Ayyappan.

== Awards and recognitions ==
His musical documentary, Balikurippu, has received Kerala Sangeetha Nataka Akademi award in the category musical videos. Balikurippu also won the Special Jury Award, at the 6th International Documentary and Short Film Festival of Kerala, in 2013.

== See also ==
- John Abraham (director)
- A. Ayyappan
