= Exorcism in Islam =

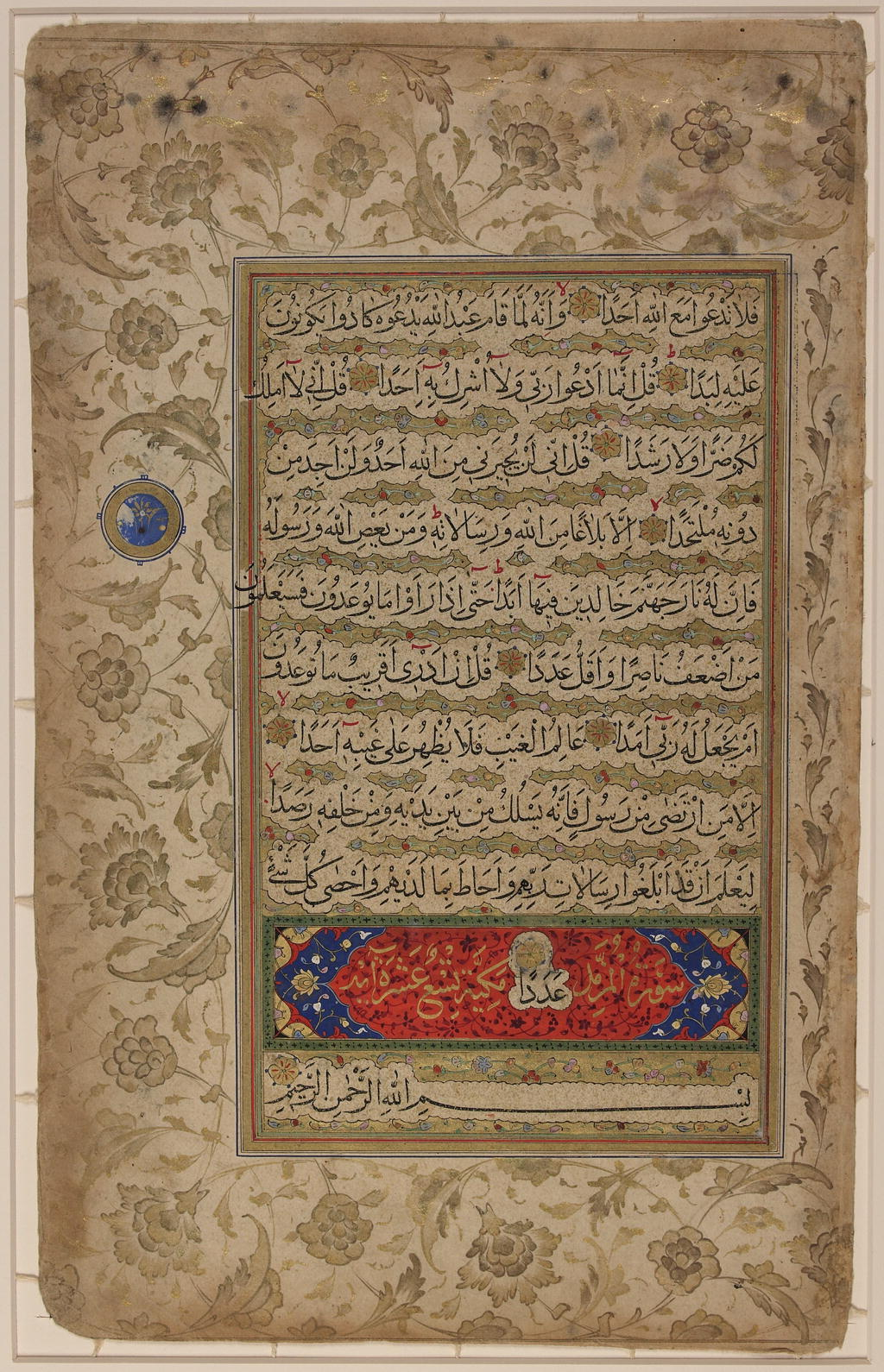
The 72nd chapter of the Qur'an entitled Al-Jinn (The Jinn), as well as the heading and introductory bismillah of the next chapter entitled al-Muzzammil (The Enshrouded One).

In Islam, the belief that spiritual entities—such as jinn, and devils—can possess a person, a thing, or location, is upheld; as is the belief that spirits can be expelled from the possessed person (or thing/location) through exorcism. This practice is called al-'azm, ṭard al-shayṭān/al-jinn (expulsion of devils/spirits), or ruqya (Arabic: رقية, romanized: ruqya, spell, charm, magic, incantation), and exorcists are called raqi.

Belief in the supernatural—witchcraft, sorcery, magic, ghosts, and demons—in the Muslim world is not marginalized as eccentric or a product of ignorance, but is prevalent among all social classes. Belief in the supernatural creatures such as jinn are both an integral part of Islamic belief, and a common explanations in society: "for evil, illness, health, wealth, and position in society as well as all mundane and inexplicable phenomena in between". Given the moral ambivalence ascribed to supernatural agents in Islamic tradition, exorcisms can be addressed to both good and evil spirits.

Jinn are thought to be able to enter and physically possess people for various reasons, while devils (shayāṭīn) assault the heart (qalb) and attempt to turn their victims to evil.

== Possession in Islam ==
Most Muslim scholars believe in the possibility that jinn can physically possess people. Only a minority denies possession and argues that jinn can merely whisper to a person. The everyday-life concern may vary. Some consider possession to be purely theoretical with no practical application, others consider interference of jinn only under rare circumstances, for example, when summoned by a sorcerer, yet others take it seriously and attribute everyday events to demonic activities. Jinn are thought to be able to enter and physically possess people for various reasons, while devils assault the heart (qalb) and attempt to turn their victims to evil. Because of that, jinn are associated with physical and mental illnesses, while cases of moral transgressions speak about devils (shayāṭīn) or Iblīs.

Mental disorders, such as epilepsy, forgetfulness, schizophrenia, lack of energy, and morbid fears, are often attributed to demonic-possessions and witchcraft. Yet, not all mental-illnesses are attributed to demons, rather demons are believed to cause such symptoms. Belief in Jinn-possession is not only prevalent in Middle Eastern countries, such as Saudi Arabia, but also among Muslims in Great Britain. Belief in demonic possession also prevails among educated people.

Due the ambiguous nature of jinn, some people may volunteer for possession. Possession by spirits is believed to grant beneficent powers, as in the case of diviners. In that case, the possessed performs a trance dance (hadra) in order to renew their covenant with their personal jinni. In context of Swahili culture, jinn possession may be used for healing purposes. Such possessions are to be distinguished from cultural concepts of possession by demons.

=== Possessing spirits ===
Possession could be either that the spirit enters the victim's body physically and stays there, or is haunted by their presence but stays detached from their victim. The latter would manifest in somatic problems such as bad dreams, while the former supposedly causes confusion, violence, and superhuman strength.

According to the Islamic view on possession, a corrupted soul (nafs) increases susceptibility (dha'iyfah) to possession by evils spirits. Among them are ghosts (arwa'), jinn, and devils. The jinn differ from devils, by that the former can be believers (Muslim). However, since both are said to be created from some sort of fire, they are affined in some local Islamic beliefs. In some beliefs, ghosts are the souls of the improperly-buried dead and those who have been cursed by God. They are conceptually different from jinn-possession.

The jinn can be good or evil and act autonomously or inflict harm when enslaved through magic. Since jinn share their bodily nature with humans, jinn may also possess people because they fell in love with them, often resulting in alleged intercourse between these two. Jinn may also possess someone to take revenge if angered. In such cases, the jinn are also thought to harm a person by hitting them. Even if a pious jinni befalls a human, there is need for an exorcism as relationships between humans and jinn are socially frowned (makruh) upon.

Shaitan (pl. شَيَاطِين shayāṭīn) assault their victims by whisperings (وَسْوَسَة waswasa), which is spiritually, rather than possessing them physically. The devils' sole purpose is to lure both humans and jinn into sinful activities, both minor ones and major ones. Paradoxically, susceptibility to the devils also increase with piety, since the devils are more engaged to corrupt a pure soul than a tainted one.

== Ruqyā (exorcism) ==
Exorcisms are performed by religious authorities, such as a mullah or a qualified Raqi or saint (darvish) who has been blessed by God (barakah). To qualify as a Raqi, one needs, among other criteria, to believe in God, practise the Five Pillars of Islam, follow the Sunnah as exemplified by Muhammad and the saints, believe that the Quran has the power to influence spirits, and knows about the spiritual world.

For preparations, distractions, such as pictures, music, and golden jewelry, are removed to enable angels to enter. During the exorcism the exorcist seeks refuge in God and recites Quranic verses. The process further constitutes questioning the patient about their emotional state and dreams. Next, the exorcist negotiates with the possessing creature. Such negotiation may include to command the spirit to curse Satan. It is believed that a satanic spirit would refuse to curse their father and can be identified as a devil, much tougher to manage. If the jinni is willing to negotiate, some healers make attempts to convince them to convert to Islam. Some traditions request aid from good jinn (muwakkal) to negotiate with the possessing spirit.

The dervish is said to be able to perform exorcisms by virtue of having received divine blessings (barakah). The most common technique is tazeem (dialogue) which refers to a negotiation with the spirit. In some cases, the dervish is also expected to travel to a mystical world where the dervish confronts the possessing entity. After the exorcism is done, there is no required payment, since the procedure is religiously motivated, but usually the patients offer a payment by putting money into the dervish's pocket.

== See also ==
- Spirit possession in Islam
- Islam and magic
- Exorcism
  - Exorcism in Christianity
    - Exorcism in the Catholic Church
  - Exorcism#Buddhism
  - Exorcism#Judaism
  - Exorcism in Hinduism
- Devil
- Demonic possession
- Al-Mu'awwidhatayn
- Glossary of Islam
- Outline of Islam
- Index of Islam-related articles

== Bibliography ==
- Bulkeley, Kelly; Adams, Kate; Davis, Patricia M., eds. (2009). Dreaming in Christianity and Islam: Culture, Conflict, and Creativity. New Brunswick, NJ: Rutgers University Press. p. 148. ISBN 978-0-813-54610-0.
- Griffel, Frank (2005). Islam and rationality : the impact of al-Ghazālī: papers collected on his 900th anniversary. Leiden, Netherlands: Brill. p. 103. ISBN 978-9-004-29095-2.
- Jones, Lindsay (2005). Encyclopedia of Religion. Vol. 13 (2 ed.). Detroit, MI: Macmillan Reference USA. p. 8687. ISBN 0-02-865733-0.
- Al-Krenawi, A.; Graham, J.R. (1997). "Spirit Possession and Exorcism in the Treatment of a Bedouin Psychiatric Patient". Clinical Social Work Journal. 25 (2): 211. doi:10.1023/A:1025714626136. S2CID 140937987.
- Maʻrūf, Muḥammad (2007). Jinn Eviction as a Discourse of Power: A Multidisciplinary Approach to Modern Moroccan Magical Beliefs and Practices. Brill. p. 2. ISBN 978-90-04-16099-6.
- Meldon, J.A. (1908). "Notes on the Sudanese in Uganda". Journal of the Royal African Society. 7 (26): 123–146. JSTOR 715079.
- Rassool, G. Hussein (2015). Islamic Counselling: An Introduction to theory and practice. New York: Routledge. ISBN 978-1-317-44124-3.
- Sells, Michael Anthony (1996). Early Islamic Mysticism: Sufi, Qurʼan, Miraj, Poetic and Theological Writings. Paulist Press. p. 143. ISBN 978-0-809-13619-3.
- Szombathy, Zoltan (2014). "Exorcism". In Fleet, Kate; Krämer, Gudrun; Matringe, Denis; Nawas, John; Rowson, Everett (eds.). Encyclopaedia of Islam. Vol. 3. doi:10.1163/1573-3912_ei3_COM_26268. ISBN 978-90-04-26963-7.
- Westermarck, Edward (23 April 2014). Ritual and Belief in Morocco. Routledge Revivals. Vol. 1. Routledge. pp. 263–264. ISBN 978-1-317-91268-2.
