= Padmini =

Padmini (from Padma, a name for the Hindu god Lakshmi), may refer to:

== People ==
=== Given name ===
- Rani Padmini (fl. 13th/14th centuries), Rani of the Mewar kingdom
- Padmini (actress) (1932–2006), Indian actress and Bharathanatyam dancer
- Padmini Chettur (born 1970), Indian dancer
- Padmini Devi (born 1943), titular Rajmata of Jaipur, India
- Padmini Dian (born 1986), Indian politician
- Padmini Kolhapure (born 1965), Indian actress and singer
- Padmini Murthy, Indian-American physician
- Padmini Prakash, Indian news anchor, actress, and transgender rights activist
- Padmini Priyadarshini (1944–2016), Indian actress, dancer and choreographer
- Padmini Rout (born 1994), Indian chess player
- Padmini Swaminathan, Indian feminist economist
- Padmini Thomas, Indian track athlete

=== Surname ===
- Divya Padmini, Indian actress
- Kumari Padmini (died 1980), Indian actress
- Kutty Padmini (born 1956), Indian actress
- Rani Padmini (actress) (1962–1986), Indian actress
- T. K. Padmini (1940–1969), Indian painter

== Other uses ==
- Padmini (film), an Indian Malayalam-language biographical film with Anumol
- Padmini, a 2023 Indian Malayalam-language film directed by Senna Hegde
- Premier Padmini, an automobile manufactured in India 1964–2001
- Padmini Pictures, an Indian film production company cofounded by B. R. Panthulu

== See also ==
- Padma (disambiguation)
