= A. Ayyappan =

Indian poet

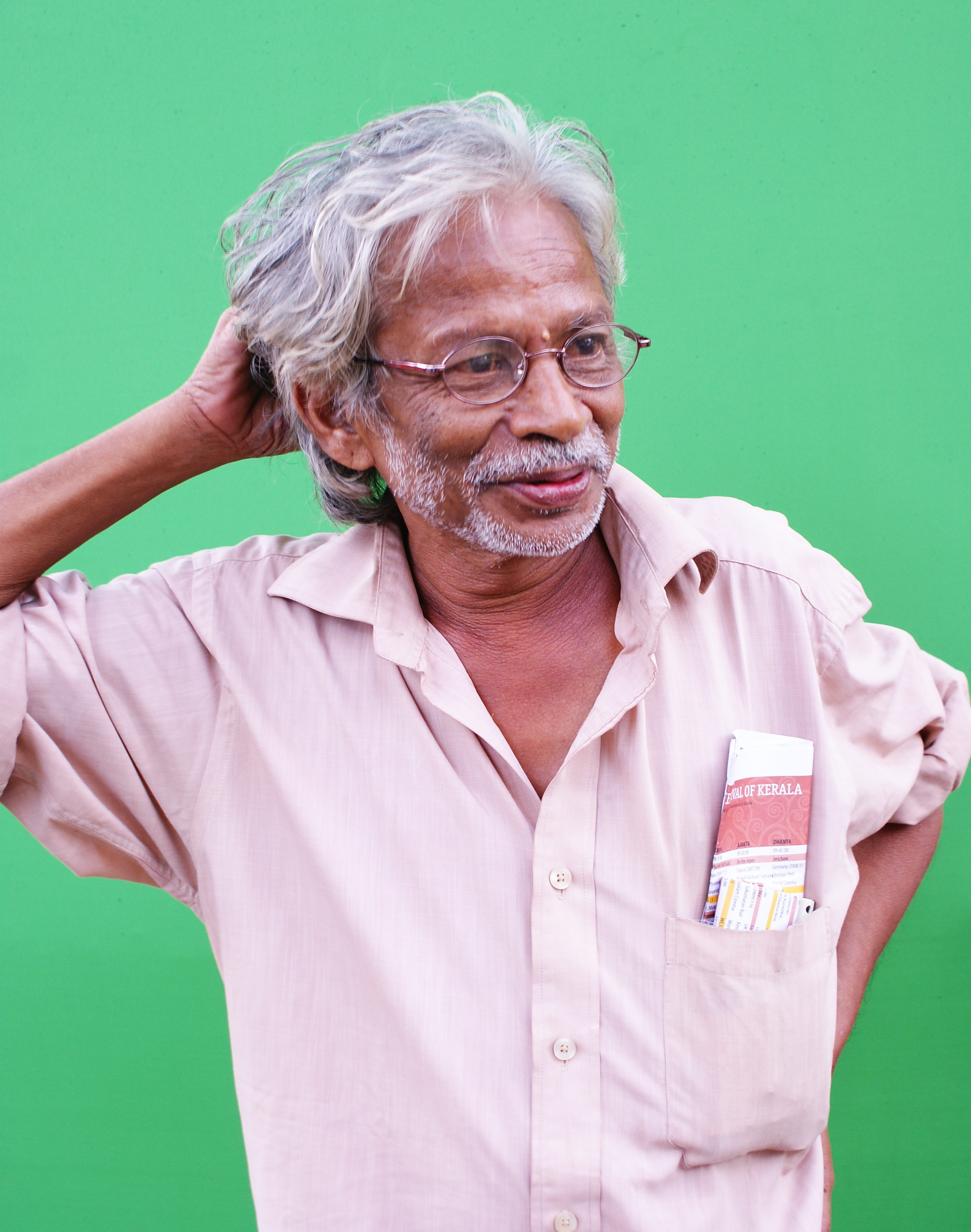
- Born: A. Ayyappan; 27 October 1949; Nemom, United State of Travancore and Cochin, Dominion of India (present day Thiruvananthapuram, Kerala, India)
- Died: 21 October 2010 (aged 60); Thiruvananthapuram, Kerala, India
- Occupations: Poet; Essayist; Translator; Lyricist; Editor; Proof reader; Political activist
- Writing career
- Notable works: Veyil Thinnunna Pakshi; Greeshmame Sakhee
- Notable awards: Asan Poetry Prize (2010); Kerala Sahitya Akademi Award (1999)

A. Ayyappan (27 October 1949 – 21 October 2010) was an Indian Malayalam-language poet in the modernist period. He is considered as the "Icon of anarchism" in Malayalam poetry. He was also an iconoclast figure who had a close friendship with famous Malayalam film director John Abraham.

== Life ==
=== Early life ===
Born in a wealthy goldsmith family, in Nemom, United State of Travancore and Cochin (present day Kerala), he became a non-conformist member of reading Malayali families. He had a very tragic childhood. His father, Arumukham, died when he was only one year old, perhaps due to poison. Ayyappan, who had said that he was not sure whether his father's death was a suicide or a murder, wrote in a poem that his mother was pregnant at the time of the suicide. He lost his mother, Muthammal, when he was 15. Ayyappan was supported by his sister Subbalakshmi and his brother-in-law V. Krishnan.

=== Literary career ===
Ayyappan started writing poetry when he was a student. He became involved in the Communist Party of India and joined the staff of Janayugom, the party newspaper. Ayyappan is well known for his heart touching poems and his bohemian lifestyle. Ayyappan, who got intoxicated by the creativity of turning the pain of the homeless into poetry, slept on shop verandas and wrote poems – which were untainted depiction of life. In his own words, destitution and insecurity transformed him into a poet. He can be considered the icon of anarchism in Kerala. Media reports often compares his literary works with that of Pavithran Theekkuni for their narrating style. He was a close friend of the late filmmaker John Abraham. Ayyappan was also famous as a great lover of sunlight ('veyil' in Malayalam language) and a passionate adherent of Communism. For English translation of his poems see 'Selected Poems of A. Ayyappan from God's Own Country' published by Authors Press - translation by P.K.N.Panicker ISBN 978-81-7273-840-2. Also available in electronic format through Kindlebooks.

"Though a bohemian in the tradition of P. Kunhiraman Nair, Malayalam's celebrated poet of yesteryear, Ayyappan was amazingly rigorous in his poetic expression. Often, the street was his home, for homes seldom welcomed the poet in. But few writers in these times can claim to have had so vast a circle of loving and adoring friends, a large majority of them young men and women."

=== Death ===
His body was found abandoned in the streets of Thampanoor, Thiruvananthapuram, on 21 October 2010. Without recognising the poet, police took his body to General Hospital. His body was kept in hospital mortuary without anybody recognising who he was and later identified by noon on 22 October 2010. He was on his way to Chennai to accept the Asan Puraskaram on Saturday, 23 October 2010. According to other news papers like Gulf News, Gulf Times, The Times of India, Haryana News and Indian Express, he died in a local general hospital after being found unconscious on a roadside.

=== #MeToo controversy ===
A woman accused Ayyappan of sexually abusing her when she was ten years old. Her claims were supported by the writer Echmukutty who said he had violated her modesty through inappropriate touch several times.

== Awards ==
He won the Asan Smaraka Kavitha Puraskaram (Asan Poetry Prize), one of the highest literary awards in Malayalam literature, for the year 2010. Ayyappan was also a recipient of Kerala Sahitya Akademi Award for Poetry in 1999. Ayyappan's life has been documented on a short film, Ithrayum Yathabhagam, made by Odessa Sathyan, one of the founders of Odessa Collective, a people's film movement in Kerala.

== Important works ==
- Mulamthandinu Rajayakshmaavu
- Yangjam
- Ente shavapetti chumakunnavarodu
- Veyil Thinnunna Pakshi
- Greeshmame sakhee
- Karuppu
- Budhanum Aattinkuttiyum
- Chitharogaaspatryile Dinangal
- Malamillaatha Pambu
- Greeshmavum Kanneerum
- Tettiyodunna SeconduSoochi
- Kalkkariyude Niramullavar (Collection of Poems)
- Sumangali
- Panikku Marnnu Pachavellam

== See also ==
- Malayalam literature
- List of Malayalam-language authors
