= Au hasard Balthazar =

- French poster
- Directed by: Robert Bresson
- Written by: Robert Bresson
- Produced by: Mag Bodard
- Starring: Anne Wiazemsky
- Cinematography: Ghislain Cloquet
- Edited by: Raymond Lamy
- Music by: Franz Schubert; Jean Wiener
- Distributed by: Cinema Ventures
- Release date: 25 May 1966
- Running time: 95 minutes
- Countries: France; Sweden
- Language: French
- Box office: $45,406 (2003 re-release)

Au hasard Balthazar (French pronunciation: [o a.zaʁ bal.ta.zaʁ]; meaning "Balthazar, at Random"), also known as Balthazar, is a 1966 tragedy film written and directed by Robert Bresson. Believed to be inspired by a passage from Fyodor Dostoyevsky's 1868–69 novel The Idiot, the film follows a donkey as he is given to various owners, most of whom treat him callously.

Noted for Bresson's ascetic directorial style and regarded as a work of profound emotional effect, it is frequently listed as one of the greatest films of all time. The film premièred at the 1966 Venice Film Festival where it won the OCIC Award, the San Giorgio Prize, and the New Cinema Award.

== Plot ==
In the French countryside near the Pyrenees, a baby donkey is adopted by young children—Jacques and his sisters—who live on a farm. They baptize the donkey, christening him Balthazar, along with Marie, Jacques' childhood sweetheart, whose father is the teacher at the small school next door. When one of Jacques' sisters dies, his family vacates the farm, and Marie's family takes Balthazar over in an informal arrangement. Balthazar is given to local farmhands, who work him relentlessly. Years pass until Balthazar is involved in an accident and runs off, eventually finding his way back to Marie, now a teenager. Marie's father becomes embroiled in legal disputes over the farm with Jacques' father, and Balthazar is given to a local bakery for delivery work.

Gérard, the leader of a young criminal gang, works as a delivery boy at the bakery. Jealous of Balthazar because of Marie's affection for the donkey, he takes charge of him and treats him cruelly. One day, while driving a 2CV, Marie spots Balthazar by the roadside and stops to greet him. Gérard, who had been sleeping nearby, gets into her car and refuses to leave despite her demands. It is implied that Gérard sexually assaults her after she gives up trying to flee, and afterward, she drives home. Marie enters into an abusive relationship with the violent Gérard, leaving her parents behind. Gérard is later summoned to the local police station and questioned about a murder, along with Arnold, an alcoholic who is also a suspect. Neither is arrested. Gérard and his gang assault Arnold, accusing him of being a murderer and a snitch. Meanwhile, Balthazar falls ill and spends several months lying down in a state of despair, completely unable to move. Gerard prepares to kill Balthazar by bludgeoning him to death, but Arnold intervenes and takes Balthazar under his care.

Balthazar recovers, and Arnold uses the donkey, along with another, to guide tourists around the Pyrenees. When the tourist season ends, Balthazar escapes and is taken by a circus. When Balthazar spots Arnold in the audience, he becomes agitated, and Arnold retrieves him. Arnold's uncle dies, leaving him a fortune. He throws a wild party at a bar, where Marie and her mother talk, and Marie is asked to return home. She refuses. Gérard places Arnold on Balthazar's back to ride home, but Arnold, too drunk to stay upright, falls off, hits his head, and dies. The police send Balthazar to market, where a greedy local miller buys Balthazar, exploiting him for pumping water and milling grain.

One rainy night, Marie, soaked and desperate, knocks on the miller's door, seeking shelter after running away from Gérard. The miller offers to be her companion and help her escape, as she confides in him her desire to "run away." However, the next morning, he approaches her parents and offers them Balthazar, implying that Marie will follow. Marie returns to her parents. Jacques visits, expressing his desire to marry her. When Marie reveals the abuse she has endured, Jacques remains steadfast in his intentions. He also informs her that his father no longer wants the money the court ordered Marie's father to pay. Marie is conflicted, unsure whether she is angry with Jacques or wants to be with him. She declares her intention to confront Gérard and visits a barn where they used to meet. Gérard is there with his gang, and they strip her, beat her, and lock her inside.

Marie's father and Jacques find her and break a window to rescue her. They take her home in a cart pulled by Balthazar. Later, Jacques wishes to see Marie, but her mother informs him, "She's gone and will never come back." Shortly after, Marie's father dies during a visit from a priest. As Marie's mother grieves, Gérard arrives with his gang and asks to borrow Balthazar. Marie's mother refuses, as Balthazar is meant to carry the ashes of Marie's father in his funeral procession. That night, Gérard abducts Balthazar to transport contraband across the Spanish border.

When Gérard and his accomplice meet their contact, they are ambushed by customs guards, who open fire. The two flee, abandoning Balthazar to his fate. By morning, Balthazar is seen with a gunshot wound. As a shepherd and his flock approach, the sheep gather around Balthazar, their bells jingling. He lies down and dies.

== Cast ==
- Anne Wiazemsky as Marie
- Walter Green as Jacques
- François Lafarge as Gérard
- Philippe Asselin as Marie's father
- Nathalie Joyaut as Marie's mother
- Jean-Claude Guilbert as Arnold
- Pierre Klossowski as the miller
- Jean-Joel Barbier as the priest
- François Sullerot as the baker
- Marie-Claire Fremont as the baker's wife
- Jacques Sorbets as the gendarme
- Jean Rémignard as the attorney

== Production ==
After making several prison-themed films using his theory of "pure cinematography", Bresson stated that he wanted to move onto a different style of filmmaking. Bresson later confirmed that Marie was inspired by a character in Bernanos' novel, La Joie, and that Balthazar was meant to be based on the priest's death at the end of the novel. Moreover, Bresson uses ideas and influences from Jansenism on the exploration of humanity, in which he compares the film's overall premise as following the life of Saint Ignatius. Bresson produced the film with help from the Swedish Film Institute.

According to Wiazemsky's 2007 novel Jeune Fille, she and Bresson developed a close relationship during the shooting of the film, although it was not consummated. On location they stayed in adjoining rooms and Wiazemsky said that "at first, he would content himself by holding my arm, or stroking my cheek. But then came the disagreeable moment when he would try to kiss me ... I would push him away and he wouldn't insist, but he looked so unhappy that I always felt guilty." Later Wiazemsky had sex with a member of the film's crew, which she says gave her the courage to reject Bresson as a lover. Bresson was known to cast nonprofessional actors and use their inexperience to create a specific type of realism in his films. Wiazemsky states: "It was not his intention to teach me how to be an actress. Almost against the grain, I felt the emotion the role provoked in me, and later, in other films, I learned how to use that emotion."

Ghislain Cloquet was the cinematographer for Au hasard Balthazar; it was the first of three films Cloquet shot for Bresson. Bresson's long collaboration with Léonce-Henri Burel had ended with Bresson's previous film, The Trial of Joan of Arc. As described by Daryl Chin, Bresson and Cloquet "would evolve a cinematic style of subtle, sun-dappled radiance; without extending the photography into extremes of chiaroscuro contrast, Cloquet would heighten the lighting so that even the greys would glisten."

The film's editor was Raymond Lamy, a veteran of French cinema whose first editing credit was in 1931. From 1956 through 1971, Lamy edited all of Bresson's films excepting The Trial of Joan of Arc (1962).

== Reception ==
When Au hasard Balthazar first played in New York at the 1966 Film Festival, "it received mostly unfavorable notices". Reviews in Europe, however, were glowing. The noted filmmaker and Cahiers du Cinéma critic Jean-Luc Godard said, "Everyone who sees this film will be absolutely astonished [...] because this film is really the world in an hour and a half." Godard married Anne Wiazemsky, who played Marie in the film, in 1967. Film critic Tom Milne called it "perhaps [Bresson's] greatest film to date, certainly his most complex".

The theatrical release in the United States came four years later. In 1970, Roger Greenspun of The New York Times lauded the film's final scene as "surely one of the most affecting passages in the history of film". Andrew Sarris, one of cinema's most influential critics, wrote in his 1970 review: "No film I have ever seen has come so close to convulsing my entire being ... It stands by itself as one of the loftiest pinnacles of artistically realized emotional experience." The New Yorker film critic Pauline Kael, however, wrote that although some consider the work a masterpiece, "others may find it painstakingly tedious and offensively holy". Ingmar Bergman said, "this Balthazar, I didn't understand a word of it, it was so completely boring ... A donkey, to me, is completely uninteresting, but a human being is always interesting."

The film's religious imagery, spiritual allegories and naturalistic, minimalist aesthetic style have since been widely praised by reviewers. In 2005, James Quandt referred to it as a "brief, elliptical tale about the life and death of a donkey" that has "exquisite renderings of pain and abasement" and "compendiums of cruelty" that tell a powerful spiritual message. In 2003, J. Hoberman stated, "Robert Bresson's heart-breaking and magnificent Au Hasard Balthazar (1966) – the story of a donkey's life and death in rural France – is the supreme masterpiece by one of the greatest of 20th-century filmmakers." Manohla Dargis views Au hasard Balthazar as "one of the greatest films in history", writing that it "stirs the heart and soul as much as the mind." Roger Ebert argued, "The genius of Bresson's approach is that he never gives us a single moment that could be described as one of Balthazar's 'reaction shots.' Other movie animals may roll their eyes or stomp their hooves, but Balthazar simply walks or waits, regarding everything with the clarity of a donkey who knows he is a beast of burden, and that his life consists of either bearing or not bearing [...] This is the cinema of empathy."

Ignatiy Vishnevetsky similarly commented, "Bresson never attempts to humanize Balthazar. [...] What Balthazar experiences of human nature is both pure and limited: the embrace of a lonely young woman, the unprovoked attack of an angry young man, and the work of the farms whose owners worry over money. He is only a donkey, and therefore something much more." Ebert also credits Bresson's ascetic approach to actors for much of the work's emotional power, writing, "The actors portray lives without informing us how to feel about them; forced to decide for ourselves how to feel, forced to empathize, we often have stronger feelings than if the actors were feeling them for us."

On the review aggregator website Rotten Tomatoes, the film has a rare 100% approval rating based on 43 reviews, with an average rating of 9.8/10. The critics consensus reads, "Au Hasard Balthazar uses one animal's lifelong journey to trace a soberly compelling – and ultimately heartbreaking – outline of the human experience." Metacritic, which uses a weighted average, assigned the film a "Metacritic Must-See" designation alongside a score of 98 out of 100, based on 20 critics.

== Awards and legacy ==
The film premièred at the 1966 Venice Film Festival where it won the OCIC (International Catholic Organization for Cinema) Award, the San Giorgio Prize, and the New Cinema Award.

Au hasard Balthazar is the inspiration for 1977 Tamil-language film Agraharathil Kazhutai directed by Indian director John Abraham. The film was critically acclaimed upon its release and in 2013 and it was listed in IBN Live's 100 Greatest Indian movies of all time. In 1978, Agraharathil Kazhutai won the National Film Award for Best Feature Film in Tamil at the 25th National Film Awards.

Other films inspired by Au hasard Balthazar include Todd Solondz's Wiener-Dog (2016) and Jerzy Skolimowski's EO (2022).

Au hasard Balthazar was ranked 16th on the 2012 critics' poll of "the greatest films of all time" conducted by the film magazine Sight & Sound. It was also 21st in the directors' poll, receiving 18 votes from filmmakers including Nuri Bilge Ceylan and Béla Tarr. It was also the first-place choice of Michael Haneke in the 2002 poll. The German filmmaker Werner Herzog praised the film and called it "incredible". The American filmmaker Wes Anderson listed the film as one of his favorite films in the Criterion Collection library. The American filmmaker Richard Linklater listed the film in his top 10 film list from the Criterion Collection. In 2018 the film ranked 52nd on the BBC's list of the 100 greatest foreign-language films, as voted on by 209 film critics from 43 countries. In the 2022 Sight and Sound critic's poll, Au Hasard Balthazar was ranked at 25th place, tied with The Night of the Hunter. In the director's poll, the film was ranked at 37th place.

== Home media ==
In 2008, the film was released by the Criterion Collection as a region 1 DVD with English subtitles. In 2013 a region 2 DVD was released by Artificial Eye, again with English subtitles.
