= Manichitrathazhu =

1993 Indian film by Fazil

- Theatrical release poster
- Directed by: Fazil
- Written by: Madhu Muttam
- Produced by: Swargachitra Appachan
- Starring: Mohanlal; Suresh Gopi; Shobana
- Cinematography: Venu; Anandakuttan; Sunny Joseph
- Edited by: T. R. Shekar
- Music by: Songs: M.G. Radhakrishnan; Background Score: Johnson; Lyrics: Bichu Thirumala
- Production company: Swargachitra Films
- Distributed by: Swargachitra Release
- Release date: 25 December 1993
- Running time: 157 minutes
- Country: India
- Language: Malayalam
- Budget: ₹30 lakh
- Box office: ₹6.88 crore ₹3.71 crore (re-release)

Manichitrathazhu (transl. The Ornate Lock) is a 1993 Indian Malayalam-language epic psychological horror film directed by Fazil, written by Madhu Muttam and produced by Swargachitra Appachan. The film stars Mohanlal, Suresh Gopi, and Shobana. It also features Thilakan, Nedumudi Venu, Innocent, Vinaya Prasad, K. P. A. C. Lalitha, Sridhar, K.B. Ganesh Kumar, Sudheesh.It was Mohanlal's 200th film.

Sibi Malayil, Priyadarshan and Siddique–Lal served as the second-unit directors, who worked separately but simultaneously with Fazil to speed up the filming process. The cinematography was handled by Venu, while Anandakuttan and Sunny Joseph served as the second-unit cinematographers, and the film was edited by T. R. Shekar. The original songs were composed by M. G. Radhakrishnan, while the original score was composed by Johnson. Although Mohanlal is credited as a lead actor, the main role belongs to Shobhana, who won the National Film Award for Best Actress for her portrayal of Ganga / Nagavalli. The film won the National Film Award for Best Popular Film Providing Wholesome Entertainment. The film also won three Kerala state awards -- Best Film with Popular Appeal and Aesthetic Value (1994), Best Actress and Best Make-up Artist (PN Mani).

The film thematically followed Swapnadanam's theme which was unusual and not common in Indian cinema at the time. The film completed 300 days of run in many theatres. Manichitrathazhu was remade in four languages – in Kannada as Apthamitra (2004) (with some plot changes) which in turn was remade in Tamil as Chandramukhi (2005), in Bengali as Rajmohol (2005) and in Hindi as Bhool Bhulaiyaa (2007)– all being commercially successful. Madhu has been credited as the sole writer for the remakes after he filed a copyright suit against Fazil when the latter started being listed as the writer of the original script in the remakes. Geethaanjali, a spin-off directed by Priyadarshan with Mohanlal reprising the role of Dr. Sunny Joseph was made in 2013.

Manichitrathazhu received widespread critical acclaim upon release and is considered by many critics as one of the best films in Malayalam cinema, and developed a cult following, years after its release. It has also been regarded as one of the best psychological thrillers in Indian cinema. It was listed among the "70 Iconic Films of Indian Cinema" by Mint in 2017. A digitally remastered 4K Dolby Atmos version of Manichitrathazhu was released in theatres on 17 August 2024.

== Plot ==
Nakulan and his wife, Ganga, decide to take a vacation to Nakulan's ancestral village in Kerala. Despite strict warnings from elder family members, Nakulan insists on residing at their sprawling ancestral mansion, the Madampalli Tharavad, which is widely rumored to be haunted. Unwilling to leave the couple unescorted, the extended family joins them at the estate. Upon arrival, they are explicitly cautioned to avoid the "Thekkini", a heavily secured and locked southern wing of the house. Local lore dictates that 150 years prior, the family's powerful patriarch, Karanavar Sankaran Thambi, became infatuated with a court dancer named Nagavalli during a trip to Thanjavur and brought her back to the mansion. However, Nagavalli was secretly in love with another dancer, Ramanathan, who moved into an adjacent cottage to continue their clandestine affair. Upon discovering the betrayal, the enraged Karanavar brutally murdered them both. Legend holds that Nagavalli's vengeful spirit has remained trapped within the locked room ever since.

Ganga, a deeply curious skeptic, views the supernatural warnings as mere superstition. She persuades Nakulan's cousin, Alli, to help her illicitly acquire the keys and unlock the forbidden wing. Shortly after the room is opened, a series of disturbing and seemingly paranormal occurrences plague the household: apparitions are sighted, domestic objects shatter inexplicably, and Ganga's saree mysteriously catches fire. Traditional purification rituals and pujas fail to quell the disturbances. Given her history of melancholy caused due to her spinsterhood and a string of coincidences, the terrified family begins to suspect that another cousin, Sridevi, has been possessed by Nagavalli’s malignant spirit.

Deeply concerned, Nakulan summons his close friend, Dr. Sunny Joseph, a brilliant and eccentric United States-based Malayali psychiatrist, to evaluate the situation. Sunny immediately encounters erratic phenomena, including a near-fatal assault on Alli and the haunting sound of a woman singing and dancing in Tamil coming from the re-locked Thekkini at midnight. Adopting the vocal persona of the historical Karanavar, Sunny engages in a dialogue with the unseen entity, who identifies herself as Nagavalli and vows to decapitate the Karanavar on the impending night of Durgashtami. To piece together the puzzle, Sunny conducts field research in the nearby village of Evoor. Later, when an unknown individual attempts to poison Nakulan's tea, Sunny publicly blames the incident on Sridevi and locks her in her quarters, seemingly validating the family's supernatural suspicions.

The night before Durgashtami, Sunny intervenes in a chaotic scene where Ganga appears to be aggressively harassed by Alli's fiancé, Mahadevan, who vehemently protests his innocence. Armed with clinical evidence, Sunny diagnoses the true root of the haunting: Ganga is suffering from severe Dissociative Identity Disorder. He deduces that her childhood fixation on folklore, combined with the stress of the haunted mansion, caused her to internalize the persona of Nagavalli. In her altered state, Ganga perceives Mahadevan as her lost lover Ramanathan, and her husband Nakulan as the hated Karanavar whom she must execute on Durgashtami. Sunny confides the clinical reality to Sridevi, who agrees to assist him. Meanwhile, the skeptical elders summon a renowned tantric expert, Pullattuparam Brahmadathan Namboodiri, to perform an exorcism. Fortunately, the Namboodiri turns out to be an old associate of Sunny and agrees to seamlessly integrate the psychological therapy into his traditional rituals.

On Durgashtami night, Ganga fully submerges into her homicidal Nagavalli alter-ego. Believing Mahadevan to be Ramanathan, she follows him into the elaborate ritual courtyard prepared by the Namboodiri. The tantric master converses with the persona, promising to facilitate her revenge by allowing her to behead the Karanavar, but in turn, she has to leave Ganga's body. Nakulan is brought forward as the target. Just as Ganga raises the sword to strike, the Namboodiri dispenses dense smoke and sacred ash directly into her face, momentarily blinding her. Capitalizing on the distraction, Sunny rapidly twists a lever and replaces Nakulan with a lifelike straw dummy. The blind fury of the Nagavalli persona drives her to hack the dummy to pieces. Fully convinced that she has finally avenged her murder, the vengeful alter-ego permanently leaves her body.

With the underlying trauma resolved, Sunny utilizes targeted psychiatric therapy to rehabilitate Ganga. The narrative concludes as the unified family bids a warm farewell to the couple. Before departing for the United States, Sunny proposes in a unique way to Sridevi, who happily accepts.

== Cast ==
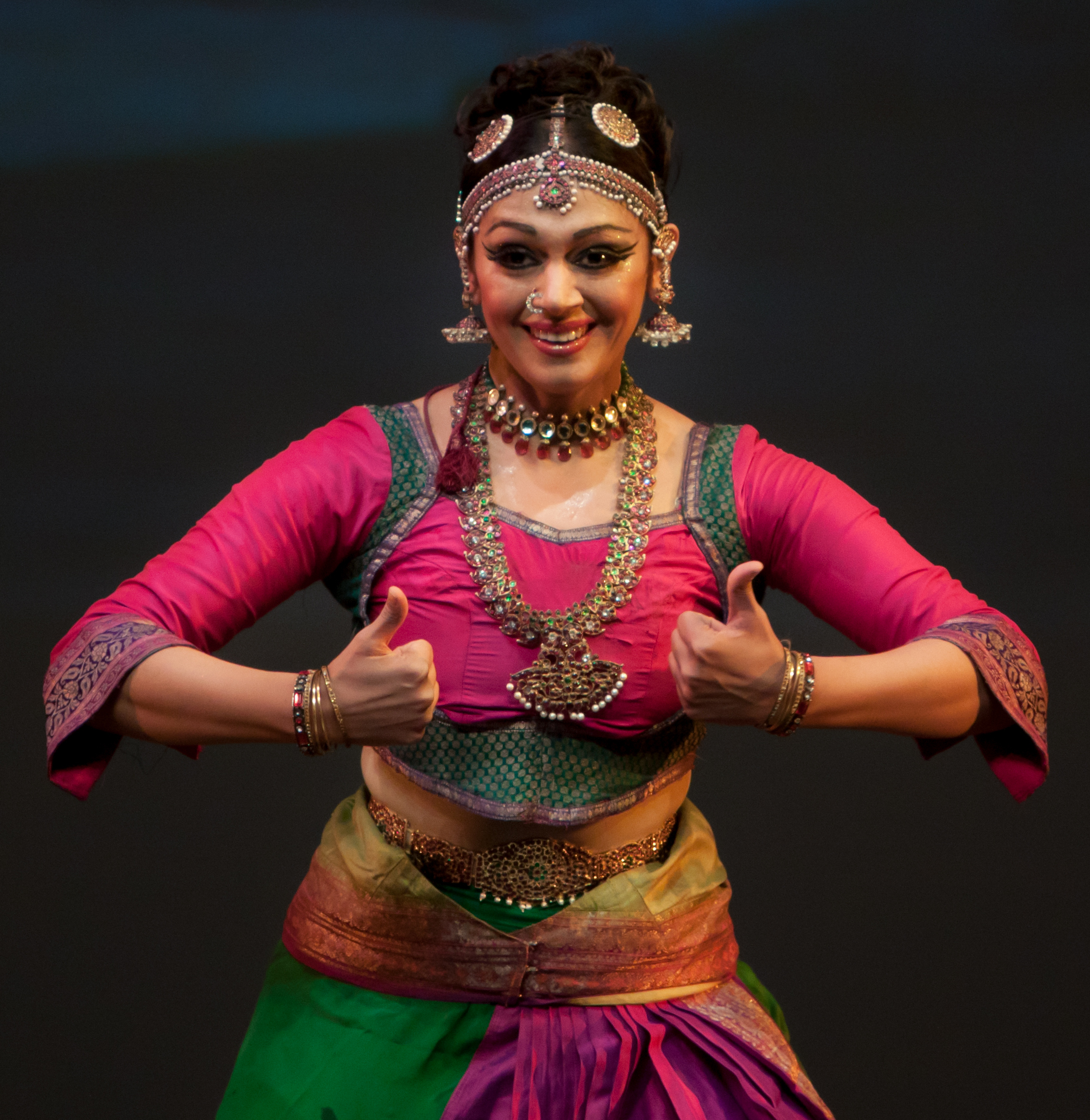
Shobhana was awarded the National Film Award for Best Actress for her portrayal of Ganga / Nagavalli.

- Mohanlal as Dr. Sunny Joseph
- Shobhana in a dual role as:
  - Ganga (voiceover by Bhagyalakshmi)
  - Nagavalli (voiceover by Durga)
- Suresh Gopi in dual role as Nakulan and Shankaran Thambi
- Vinaya Prasad as Sridevi (voiceover by Anandavally)
- Nedumudi Venu as Thampi
- Kuttyedathi Vilasini as Thampi's wife
- Sudheesh as Chanthu
- K. P. A. C. Lalitha as Bhasura
- Innocent as Unnithan
- Sridhar in dual role as:
  - P. Mahadevan
  - Ramanathan
- Rudra as Alli (voiceover by Ambily)
- Thilakan as Pullattuparam Brahmadathan Namboothiripaddu (extended cameo appearance)
- Kuthiravattam Pappu as Kattuparamban
- K. B. Ganesh Kumar as Dasappan Kutty
- Vaijayanthi as Jayasree
- Kottayam Santha as School Head mistress

== Production ==
=== Development ===
Then young directors Sibi Malayil, Priyadarshan and Siddique–Lal served as the second-unit directors, who worked separately but simultaneously with veteran director Fazil to significantly speed up the filming process. The cinematography was by Venu, Anandakuttan and Sunny Joseph served as the second-unit cinematographers, the film was edited by T. R. Shekar. The original songs were composed by M. G. Radhakrishnan, while the original score was composed by Johnson. Mohanlal, though credited as a lead actor, has been noted to have only an extended cameo, the main role being that of Shobhana. The role of Dr. Sunny potrayed by Mohanlal was initially planned to be a more serious character and Director Fazil had decided to cast Mammooty. Later on, they decided to add a comical aspect to the character and roped in Mohanlal.

=== Filming ===
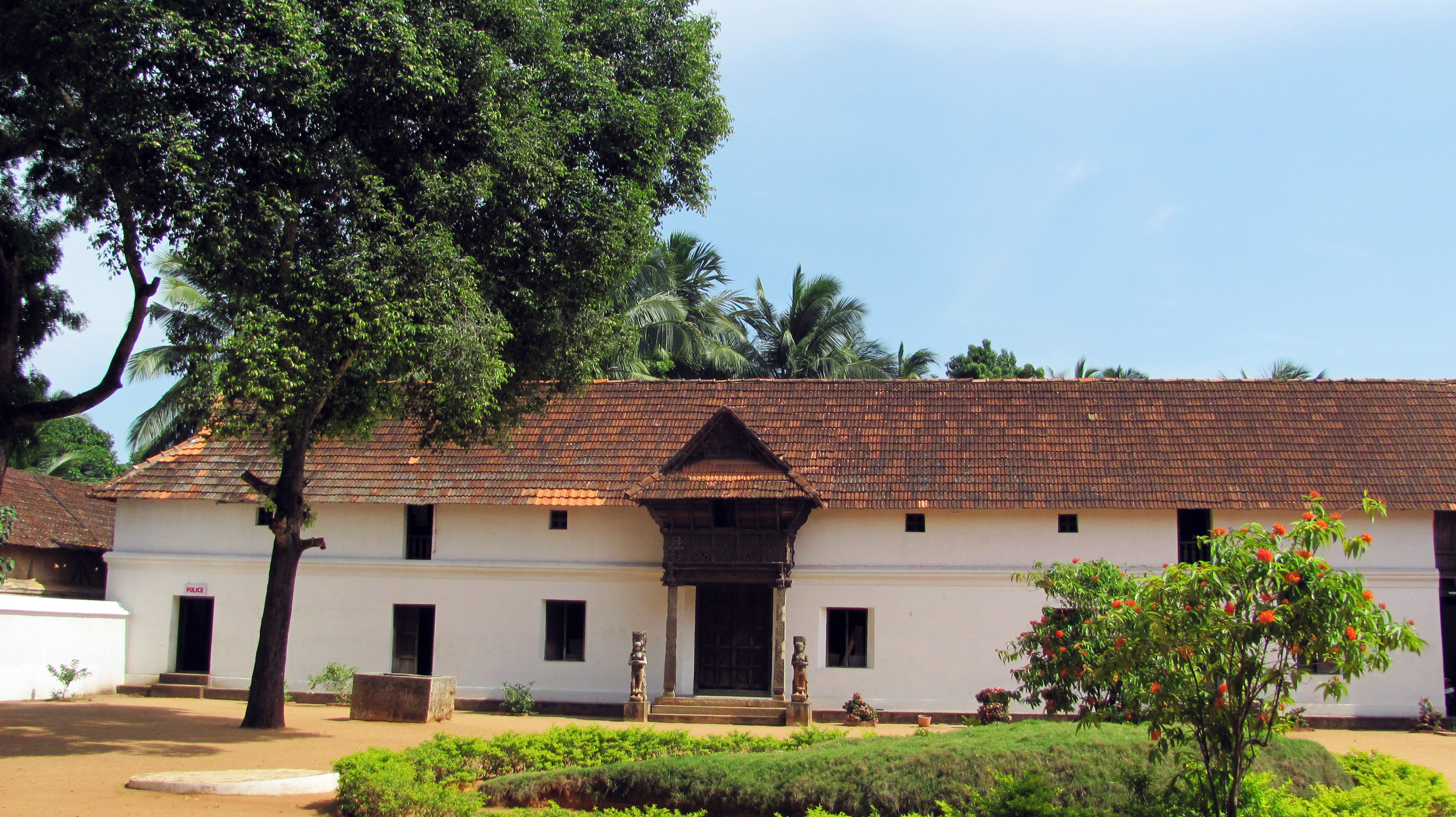
Filming took place in Padmanabhapuram of Kanyakumari district.

The haunted Thekkini room was created inside the Vasan House in Chennai, the house of late S. S. Vasan, the founder of Gemini Studios. It was one of the film's key locations apart from Padmanabhapuram Palace and Hill Palace, Tripunithura. The major parts of the film were filmed at Hill Palace, Tripunithura and the climax was filmed at Padmanabhapuram Palace. The painting of Nagavalli was made by artist R. Madhavan, drawn without a live model. Most of the important sequences are shot at Hill Palace, Kochi but the most integral song of the movie, "Oru Murai Vanthu" was completely shot at the Padmanabhapuram Palace, Tamil Nadu.

=== Dubbing credits ===
Shobana's voice was dubbed by two dubbing artistes—Bhagyalakshmi and Durga. Bhagyalakshmi dubbed her voice for Ganga, while Durga gave voice to the character's alter-ego, Nagavalli. Nagavalli's voice is heard only in a minor part of the film compared to Ganga's. Durga was not credited in the film or its publicity material and until 2016, the popular belief was that Bhagyalakshmi solely dubbed both voices.

In January 2016, in an article Ormapookkal published by Manorama Weekly, Fazil revealed that initially Bhagyalakshmi dubbed for both Ganga and Nagavalli, but during post-production, some of the crew, including editor Shekar, had a feeling that both voices sounded somewhat similar even though Bhagyalakshmi tried altering her voice for Nagavalli. Since Nagavalli's dialogues are in the Tamil language, Fazil hired Tamil dubbing artist Durga for the part. But he forgot to inform Bhagyalakshmi, hence she was also unaware of it for a long time. Fazil did not credit Durga in the film; according to him, it was a difficult to make changes in the titles at that time, which was already prepared and her portion in the film was minor. The credits included only Bhagyalakshmi as the dubbing artiste for Shobana. Other dubbing artistes were Anandavally and Ambili, who dubbed for Vinaya Prasad and Rudra.

== Soundtrack ==
The soundtrack for the film was composed by M. G. Radhakrishnan which went on to become one of the most popular soundtrack in Malayalam. The album consists of nine tracks. The lyrics in Malayalam is written by Bichu Thirumala and Madhu Muttam and lyrics in Tamil are written by Vaali.

Manichitrathazhu

Soundtrack album by M. G. Radhakrishnan
- Released: 24 December 1993
- Recorded: 1993
- Venue: Chennai
- Studio: Kodandapani Audio Laboratories
- Genre: Film Soundtrack
- Length: 64:50
- Label: Wilson Audios
- Producer: M. G. Radhakrishnan

M. G. Radhakrishnan chronology
Meghasangeetham (1993)	Manichitrathazhu (1993)	Kashmeeram (1994)

No.	Title	Lyrics	Singer(s)	Length
1.	"Pazhamthamizh Paattizhayum"	Bichu Thirumala	K. J. Yesudas
2.	"Varuvaanillarumee"	Madhu Muttam	K. S. Chithra
3.	"Oru Murai Vanthu"	Vaali (Tamil), Bichu Thirumala	K. S. Chithra, K. J. Yesudas
4.	"Kumbham Kulathil Ariyathe"	Bichu Thirumala	K. J. Yesudas
5.	"Akkuthikkuthanakkombil"	Bichu Thirumala	G. Venugopal, K. S. Chithra, Sujatha Mohan, M. G. Radhakrishnan
6.	"Palavattam Pookkaalam"	Madhu Muttam	K. J. Yesudas
7.	"Uthunga Shailangalkkum"	Bichu Thirumala	Sujatha Mohan
8.	"Oru Murai Vanthu Paaraayo"	Vaali	Sujatha Mohan

== Release ==
Manichitrathazhu was released on 25 December 1993, and performed well at the box office, becoming the highest-grossing Malayalam film at the time. It ran for more than 365 days in few theatres. The psychological thriller received widespread praise for blending horror, culture, and science.

== Awards ==
Award	Ceremony	Category	Nominee(s)	Result	Ref.
National Film Awards	41st National Film Awards	Best Popular Film Providing Wholesome Entertainment	Swargachitra Appachan, Fazil	Won	
National Film Awards	41st National Film Awards	Best Actress	Shobana	Won	
Kerala State Film Awards	34th Kerala State Film Awards	Best Film with Popular Appeal and Aesthetic Value	Swargachitra Appachan, Fazil	Won	
Kerala State Film Awards	34th Kerala State Film Awards	Best Actress	Shobana	Won	
Kerala State Film Awards	34th Kerala State Film Awards	Best Makeup Artist	P. N. Mani	Won	
Kerala Film Critics Association Awards	17th Kerala Film Critics Association Awards	Best Actor	Suresh Gopi	Won	
Kerala Film Critics Association Awards	17th Kerala Film Critics Association Awards	Best Actress	Shobana	Won	
Kerala Film Critics Association Awards	17th Kerala Film Critics Association Awards	Best Music Director	M. G. Radhakrishnan	Won	
Kerala Film Critics Association Awards	17th Kerala Film Critics Association Awards	Special Jury Award	Fazil	Won	

== Themes ==
The story is inspired by a real life tragedy that happened in the Alummoottil family located at Muttom (near Haripad), belonging to central Travancore. The inheritor of the Alummoottil property and his domestic worker girl were murdered by the son-in-law after he had been written-off from the marumakkathayam system of inheritance prevalent in Kerala at the time. The murder gave rise to many local legends which serve as the basis for the film. Muttam, the writer of the film, confirmed the film was inspired by real-life events as he is a member of the Alummoottil tharavad through his maternal family.

Certain themes that were discussed in the movie were Ganga's Mental health disorders and why it's important to turn to science rather than trust conventional modes of treatments as well as Dr. Sunny and Nakulan's passionate friendship, all of which were rare in Indian cinema, creating a unique blend which received a positive response from the audience.

The film also deals with the devadasi courtesan practice formerly prevalent in southern India and its patronage by local Nair chieftains, caste prejudices and Tantric cults.

== Legacy ==
Manichitrathazhu is considered as a classic and is hailed as one of the best films ever made in Indian cinema. The film has consistently fetched maximum ratings for its television screenings. Even thirty years after its release, it has been screened more than 12 times a year on an average on Kerala's leading TV channel, Asianet. The film has received the maximum TRP rating on every screening; TRP ratings have increased every year, a rare record for a film produced in Kerala. For many Malayalis, Manichitrathazhu is a part of their cultural lives.

In a 2013 online poll in India by IBN Live, Manichitrathazhu was voted second among India's greatest films, by the audience. The poll was conducted as part of the celebration of Indian cinema completing 100 years. The poll constituted a list of 100 films from different Indian languages. A saree featuring Shobhana in a song scene from this film was released in the market as the Nagavali saree.

One of the most memorable or defining scenes of the movie where Nakulan provokes Ganga to transform into the Nagavalli persona was recreated in later Malayalam films like Om Shanti Oshana.

The film was re-released in theatres after 30 years in August 2024.

"Vijanaveedhi", a Malayalam horror novel by Aswathi Thirunal, has been listed by some as an inspiration for the film, though director Fazil and writer Madhu both deny this.

== Remakes ==
Language	Title	Year	Cast	Director	Notes
Kannada	Apthamitra	2004	Vishnuvardhan, Soundarya Ramesh	P. Vasu	Some plot changes made by the director
Tamil	Chandramukhi	2005	Rajinikanth, Jyothika, Prabhu	P. Vasu	Some plot changes made by the director
Bengali	Rajmohol	2005	Prosenjit Chatterjee, Anu Choudhury	Swapan Saha	Some additions to the plot by the director
Hindi	Bhool Bhulaiyaa	2007	Akshay Kumar, Vidya Balan, Paresh Rawal, Shiney Ahuja	Priyadarshan	

== Spin-off ==
A spin-off titled Geethaanjali was released on 14 November, 2013, directed by Priyadarshan, with Mohanlal reprising his role as Sunny and Suresh Gopi as Nakulan in a cameo appearance.

== Sequel series ==
In August 2020, producer Bhavachithra Jayakumar, known for the production of several successful films and soap operas, announced plans to develop a television serial which is a sequel of Manichitrathazhu as a direct follow-on from the film’s ending. According to Jayakumar, the story was to resume with Dr. Sunny, Nakulan and Ganga departing for Kolkata at the film’s conclusion, and continue with the couple’s journey to their ancestral home in Kolkata, exploring Ganga’s relatives. Simultaneously, the series would trace Nagavalli’s backstory set in Thanjavur, particularly around the Brihadisvara Temple. The adaptation followed an initial consideration to make it a web series, but Jayakumar decided the television format would be more suitable. Although location recce had been completed, casting was not finalized, and production faced delays owing to COVID-19-related quarantines and restrictions.

== See also ==
- Dissociative identity disorder
- Identity formation
- List of Malayalam horror films
- Mental illness in film
- Devadasi, Indian women entertainers (Nagavalli in the film)
- Bharatanatyam and Kathakali, classical Indian dances featured in the film
- Padmanabhapuram Palace
