= Sargavasantham =

- Directed by: Anil Das
- Screenplay by: Babu Pallassery
- Story by: Kakkanadan (originally published as Vadakku Ninnum Vanna Pakshi)
- Produced by: Rasheed Kattungal
- Starring: Siddique; Chippy; Narendra Prasad; Baiju; Vanitha Krishnachandran; Babu Namboothiri
- Cinematography: Ramachandra Babu
- Edited by: K. Rajagopal
- Music by: Ouseppachan
- Production company: Kattungal Films
- Distributed by: Naaz Release
- Release date: 9 May 1995
- Country: India
- Language: Malayalam

Sargavasantham is an Indian Malayalam film directed by Anil Das. It was the directorial debut of Anil Das who later did the science fiction film Bharathan Effect in 2007.

== Plot ==
The film portrays a superstitious Hindu family.

== Cast ==
- Siddique as Roy Sam
- Chippy as Abhirami
- Narendra Prasad as Dr. Sarathchandra Varma
- Baiju as Chandran
- Vanitha Krishnachandran
- Babu Namboothiri
- Jagathy Sreekumar as Kunjunni
- Jose Pellissery
- Rizabawa
- Seetha as Sathi
- Sudheer
- Zainuddin
- T. R. Omana
- Shammi Thilakan as Basheer Khan
- Manju Satheesh
- Gayathri Varsha

== Music ==
- Music: Ouseppachan
- Lyrics: Kaithapram
- Music label: Magnasound
