= Thazhvaram =

- Poster
- Directed by: Bharathan
- Written by: M. T. Vasudevan Nair
- Produced by: V. B. K. Menon
- Starring: Mohanlal; Salim Ghouse; Sumalatha
- Cinematography: Venu
- Edited by: B. Lenin; V. T. Vijayan
- Music by: Songs: Bharathan; Score: Johnson
- Production company: Anugraha Cine Arts
- Distributed by: Anugraha Cine Arts Release
- Release date: 1 June 1990
- Running time: 130 minutes
- Country: India
- Language: Malayalam
- Budget: ₹25 lakh (US$26,000)

Thazhvaram (transl. The valley) is a 1990 Indian Malayalam-language epic western film directed by Bharathan and written by M. T. Vasudevan Nair. It stars Mohanlal, Salim Ghouse, Sumalatha, Anju, and Sankaradi. It tells the story of Balan (Mohanlal) who's on the lookout for Raju (Salim Ghouse) for avenging the murder of his wife Raji (Anju). Bharathan also composed the only song featured in the film, and the background score was provided by Johnson.

The film is set against the backdrop of a remote lawless village across a valley in Palakkad, symbolising themes and landscapes reminiscent of the American Wild West. The film has achieved a cult status in Kerala since its release. It was both a critical and commercial success with many critics praising Mohanlal's performance. It is considered one of Mohanlal's best performances in his career.

== Plot ==
Balan is in search of Raju, and the search takes him to a remote village in a valley. Balan reaches a house in the hills where he is welcomed wholeheartedly by Nanu, the house owner, and Kochutty, his daughter. Balan realizes that Raju stays with them as Raghavan. Balan learns that Nanu has helped Raju start farming and that Nanu intends to have his daughter marry Raju. Balan decides to wait for Raghavan / Raju.

Raju, on his arrival, smells his enemy. The story progresses with the two having to pretend before Nanu and Kochutty that they are good friends. The film cuts to a flashback, where Raju and Balan are close friends. He, in greed for money, killed Balan's wife, Raji, on their wedding night and ran away with Balan's hard-earned money.

Balan is now back in search of Raju to avenge the death of his wife. Raju attacks Balan in one of the numerous encounters the duo has and almost kills him. Balan survives the attack to save Nanu and his daughter from Raghavan.

== Cast ==
- Mohanlal as Balan
- Salim Ghouse as Raju / Raghavan
- Sumalatha as Kochootti
- Anju as Raji
- Sankaradi as Nanu
- Balan K. Nair as Kanarettan, Raji's father

== Production ==
This is Bharathan's second film with M. T. Vasudevan Nair after Vaishali in 1988. This is the second collaboration of Mohanlal and Bharathan after Kattathe Killikudu. Bharathan, Sasi Menon, and Gayathri Ashokan did the poster designs.

== Soundtrack ==
The soundtrack of this film had only one song composed by Bharathan himself to the lines written by Kaithapram and rendered by K. J. Yesudas.

#	Song title	Singer	Note(s)
1	"Kannetha Doore Marutheeram"	K. J. Yesudas	Ragam: Sudha Saveri

== Reception ==
Upon release, the film, initially a slow starter, garnered widespread positive reviews and became a success both critically and commercially. The camera work of Venu is considered the highlight of the film. The film is considered a cult classic in Malayalam and the performance of Mohanlal is said to be one of his best in his acting career by the critics.

== Awards ==
- Filmfare Award for Best Film - Malayalam – V. B. K. Menon
- Kerala State Film Award for Best Editor – B. Lenin
