= Bharathan =

Indian filmmaker (1946–1998)

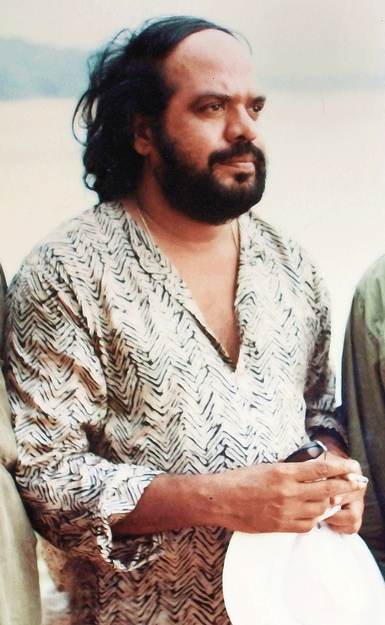
- Born: 14 November 1946; Wadakkancherry, Thrissur district, Kerala
- Died: 30 July 1998 (aged 51); Chennai, Tamil Nadu
- Occupations: Art director; Sculptor; Poster designer; Film director; Lyricist; Music composer; Editor
- Years active: 1973–1998
- Spouse: K. P. A. C. Lalitha
- Children: 2 (incl. Sidharth)
- Relatives: P. N. Menon (uncle)

Bharathan Parameshwara Menon Palissery (14 November 1946 – 30 July 1998), known mononymously as Bharathan, was an Indian film maker, artist, and art director. Bharathan is noted for being the founder of a new school of film making in Malayalam cinema, along with Padmarajan and K. G. George, in the 1980s, which created films that were widely received while also being critically acclaimed. A train of directors, and screenwriters followed this school onto the 1990s including Sibi Malayil, Kamal, Lohithadas and Jayaraj.

== Early life ==
Bharathan was born at Wadakkancherry in the Thrissur district of Kerala to Parameshwara Menon Palissery and Karthiyayini Amma. He studied at Government High School, Wadakkanchery, and then at the College of Fine Arts, Thrissur.

== Career ==
=== Art direction ===
After completing his diploma from the College of Fine Arts, Thrissur, Bharathan entered films as an art director through the Malayalam film Gandharavakshetram (1972), directed by A. Vincent, which also happened to be one of the first films where actor Thilakan played a noticeable role. He was inspired by his uncle P. N. Menon, an established director. After working as an art director and assistant director in a few films, he made his directorial debut in 1975 with Prayanam, which was based on Padmarajan's script. It also marked the rise of two early proponents of middle-stream Malayalam cinema.

=== Film direction ===
Bharathan directed over 40 films in Malayalam, Tamil, and Telugu. Starting his career in 1975 with Prayanam, Bharathan rode to fame with his off-beat Thakara, a film about a dumb-witted central character who falls in love with the village beauty. Some of his other memorable films include Rathinirvedam, Chamaram, Paalangal, Amaram, and Vaishali.

His association with Padmarajan led to films including Rathi Nirvedam and Thakara. Rathi Nirvedam was a treatment of teenage sexual angst. In Thakara, he deals with the life and longings of an intellectually disabled youth and his association with society.

In the early 1980s, he made several notable movies like Chamaram, Marmaram, Paalangal, Ormakkayi, Kattathe Kilikkoodu, Kathodu Kathoram, and many more. They did well in theatres and set the trend for meaningful mainstream cinema. Other noted directors followed suit. It was the romantic era of Malayalam cinema.

Not all of Bharathan's films skirted with bold themes and controversy. In Oru Minnaaminunginte Nurunguvettam (1987), he tells the poignant story of a childless couple in their post-retirement life. It deals with the isolation and loneliness that come with old age. The film was a departure from Bharathan's usual style and proved to be a major commercial hit while garnering critical acclaim, too.

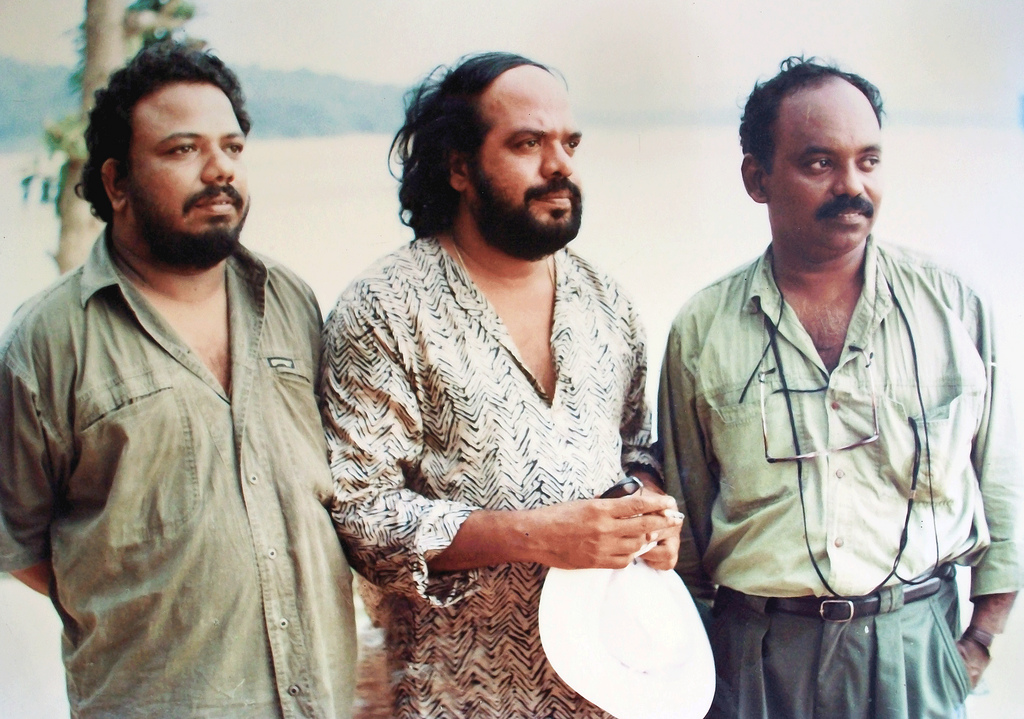
Screenwriter Lohithadas, director Bharathan and cinematographer Ramachandra Babu at the location of Venkalam.

His Vaisali (1988) is widely regarded as a modern-day masterpiece in Malayalam cinema. Scripted by the iconic Malayalam novelist M. T. Vasudevan Nair, it was an adaptation of a sub-story told in the epic Mahabharata. Another movie born from their association was Thazhvaram. The subject was revenge, a theme quite uncharacteristic of Bharathan movies. The style was inspired by classic Westerns with a brooding, reticent central character and expansive shots of barren landscape. Another movie was Amaram, which was written by A. K. Lohithadas and starred Mammootty, which was a milestone movie of the Malayalam movie of the 1990s.

Even though he was not known to cater to the star-centric system, Bharathan was instrumental in bringing together the two screen icons of Tamil cinema Sivaji Ganesan and Kamal Haasan in the Tamil film Thevar Magan, written by Kamal Haasan, which won critical acclaim and became an Industry Hit in Tamil cinema. Sivaji gave an uncharacteristically restrained yet brilliant performance. The movie won several National Awards and was remade into many regional languages (most notably Virasat in Hindi).

His more experimental films include Aaravam, more an arthouse than a commercial venture, and Nidra, about the plight of a woman who is in love with a mentally deranged man. His film Nidra was remade by his son, film director Sidharth Bharathan. Rathinirvedam, originally directed by Bharathan, which was a noted film, was also remade by another famous director, T. K. Rajeev Kumar, with Swetha Menon in the lead.

Apart from film direction, he also wrote lyrics and tuned songs for his films. (e.g., lyrics for "Thaaram Valkannadi Nokki" in Keli and "Tharum Thalirum Mizhipootti" in Chilambu or title song for Kathodu Kathoram). He collaborated with writer P. R. Nathan in Keli.

== Filmmaking style ==
Bharathan's films were known for their realistic portrayal of rural life in Kerala. Melodrama and escapism, often integral parts of mainstream cinema in India, were usually absent in his films. He also managed to steer clear of the "star-centric" culture prevalent in Indian cinema throughout his career. His later films did involve major movie stars, but usually without compromising on plot or narrative. Bharathan, along with Padmarajan and K. G. George, were largely responsible for introducing a counterculture of meaningful mainstream cinema, which often tread the middle path between arthouse and commercial cinema. This movement was often called the "middle of the road cinema." Bharathan's films were known for their visually appealing shot compositions. His background as a painter enabled him to create frames that were often credited for their visual beauty. Natural props and nature itself often became important characters in his films (like the railway track in Palangal or the sea in Amaram). Bharathan is one of the few Indian directors known to use an elaborate storyboard system for filming. He also often designed the posters for his films.

Several of his early films were known for their bold portrayal of sexual themes. His films often defied social conventions and norms about man-woman relationships. Rathinirvedam was the sexual-coming-of-age story of the relationship between a teenager and an older woman, while Chamaram dealt with the tumultuous affair between a student and his college lecturer. In Kattathe Kilikkoodu, an elderly, married professor falls for his student. Kaathodu Kaathoram was about the social ostracism of a woman who has an adulterous relationship.

The latter half of Bharathan's career saw a distinct change in filmmaking style characterised by a wider canvas, more attention to detail, and a more distinct focus on narrative style (e.g., Vaishali, Amaram, Thaazhvaaram, and Thevar Magan). Some critics argue that this quest for technical excellence was at the expense of the quality of thematic content. Films like Vaishali and Amaram (where he collaborated with acclaimed cinematographer Madhu Ambat) set a new benchmark for cinematographic excellence in Malayalam and Indian Cinema. Thaazhvaaram was stylistically inspired by classic Hollywood Westerns, though the theme and backdrop were distinctly original.

His last few films (Devaraagam, Churam and Priyuralu) were received moderately by critics.

== Death ==
Bharathan died at a private hospital in Chennai on 30 July 1998 at the age of 52 following prolonged illness. His last film, Churam, was released a year before his death. His mortal remains were brought back to his ancestral home at Wadakkancherry and cremated with full state honours.

== Personal life ==
Bharathan was married to theatre and film actress K. P. A. C. Lalitha with whom he associated in a lot of films before and after marriage. They had two children - Sreekutty, a former child actress, and Sidharth Bharathan, a film actor and director.

== Filmography ==
Year	Film	Director	Writer	Art-director	Composer	Editor	Notes	Ref.
1972	Chembarathi			Yes				
1972	Gandharvakshethram			Yes				
1973	Chenda			Yes				
1973	Dharmayudham			Yes				
1973	Ponnaapuram Kotta			Yes				
1973	Enippadikal			Yes				
1973	Maadhavikkutty			Yes				
1974	Rajahamsam			Yes				
1974	Chakravaakam			Yes				
1974	Neelakkannukal			Yes				
1974	Manyasree Viswamithran			Yes				
1974	Mucheettukalikkaarante Makal			Yes				
1975	Prayanam	Yes		Yes				
1976	Surveykkallu			Yes				
1976	Ponni			Yes				
1976	Yudhakaandam			Yes				
1977	Guruvayur Kesavan	Yes		Yes				
1978	Rathinirvedam	Yes						
1978	Aniyara	Yes						
1978	Njaan Njaan Maathram			Yes				
1978	Aaravam	Yes	Yes	Yes				
1979	Thakara	Yes		Yes				
1980	Lorry	Yes						
1980	Savithiri	Yes		Yes			Tamil film	
1980	Chamaram	Yes		Yes				
1981	Nidra	Yes	Yes	Yes				
1981	Palangal	Yes		Yes				
1981	Parankimala	Yes		Yes				
1981	Chatta	Yes	Yes	Yes				
1981	Parvathy	Yes		Yes				
1982	Marmaram	Yes		Yes				
1982	Ormakkayi	Yes		Yes				
1983	Eenam	Yes			Yes			
1983	Sandhya Mayangum Neram	Yes						
1983	Kattathe Kilikkoodu	Yes		Yes				
1984	Ente Upasana	Yes						
1985	Kathodu Kathoram	Yes			Yes			
1984	Ithiripoove Chuvannapoove	Yes		Yes				
1985	Ozhivukaalam	Yes						
1985	Oonjalaadum Uravugal	Yes					Tamil film	
1986	Chilambu	Yes						
1986	Pranamam	Yes					Also lyricist	
1987	Oru Minnaminunginte Nurunguvettam	Yes		Yes		Yes		
1987	Neela Kurinji Poothappol	Yes						
1988	Vaisali	Yes				Yes		
1989	Oru Sayahnathinte Swapnam	Yes		Yes		Yes		
1990	Thazhvaram	Yes		Yes	Yes			
1990	Malootty	Yes		Yes				
1991	Amaram	Yes						
1991	Keli	Yes	Yes		Yes			
1992	Aavarampoo	Yes		Yes			Tamil film	
1992	Thevar Magan	Yes					Tamil film	
1993	Venkalam	Yes						
1993	Chamayam	Yes						
1993	Padheyam	Yes						
1996	Devaraagam	Yes	Yes					
1997	Churam	Yes	Yes					
1998	Priyuralu	Yes	Yes				Telugu film; dubbed in Malayalam as Manjeeradhwani	

== Awards ==
=== National Film Awards ===
- 1992: National Film Award for Best Feature Film in Tamil – Thevar Magan

=== Filmfare Awards South ===
- 1979: Filmfare Award for Best Director – Malayalam Thakara
- 1980: Filmfare Award for Best Director – Malayalam Chamaram
- 1984: Filmfare Award for Best Director – Malayalam Ithiri Poove Chuvannapoove

=== Kerala State Film Awards ===
Year	Category	Film(s)
1975	Best Art Director	Prayanam
1979	Best Art Director	Thakara
1980	Best Art Director	Chamaram
1980	Second Best Film	Chamaram
1981	Best Art Director	Chatta
1982	Best Film	Marmaram
1982	Second Best Film	Ormakkayi
1982	Best Director	Marmaram, Ormakkayi
1982	Best Art Director	Ormakkayi
1984	Best Art Director	Ithiri Poove Chuvannapoove
1987	Best Popular Film	Oru Minnaminunginte Nurunguvettam
1992	Best Popular Film	Venkalam

== In popular culture ==
KB Venu portrayed Bharathan in 2025 Malayalam movie Rekhachithram directed by Jofin T Chacko
