= Cheriyachante Kroorakrithyangal =

- Directed by: John Abraham
- Written by: John Abraham
- Starring: Adoor Bhasi; Kaviyoor Ponnamma; Poornima Jayaram; Abraham Joseph; Venu
- Cinematography: Madhu Ambat
- Music by: Johnson
- Release date: 4 July 1979
- Running time: 107 minutes
- Country: India
- Language: Malayalam

Cheriyachante Kroorakrithyangal (transl. Cheriyachan's cruelties) is a 1979 Indian Malayalam-language political satire film directed by John Abraham.

== Cast ==
- Adoor Bhasi as Cheriyachen
- Kaviyoor Ponnamma as Eliyamma
- Abraham Joseph as Avarachan
- Venu as Joykutty
- Nedumudi Venu as Priest

== Reception ==
In 2026, Kallara Ajayan, writing in Kesari weekly, argued that Kerala's leftists had misinterpreted the film, with Marxist intellectual P. Govinda Pillai among those who hailed it as a leftist work, whereas it in fact upheld the political positions of the Kerala Congress.

== Awards ==
At the Kerala State Film Awards, John won a Special Jury Award and Bhasi won the Best Actor.
