= Kanakompathu =

Kanakombathu
- Directed by: Mahadevan
- Written by: Madhu Muttom
- Produced by: Dr.Leela Prasannan
- Starring: Vinay Forrt; Jagathy Sreekumar; Vinod Kishan; Manoj K. Jayan; Mythili
- Cinematography: Anandakuttan
- Edited by: P. C. Mohanan
- Music by: Mohan Sitara
- Production company: C. B. Creations
- Distributed by: Rajisri Films Release
- Release date: 24 June 2011
- Country: India
- Language: Malayalam

Kanakombathu is a 2011 Malayalam thriller film written by Madhu Muttom and directed by debutant Mahadevan. The cast includes Manoj K. Jayan, Mythili, Vinay Forrt, Jagathy Sreekumar and Vinod Kishan in the lead roles. This was a disaster at the box office and was panned by critics.

== Cast ==
- Deepu Shanth as Balu Viswanath
- Shankar Narayanan as Sameer
- Vinay Forrt as Jose Kurya
- Vinod Kishan
- Manoj K. Jayan as Sidharthan
- Mythili
- Vivek
- Urmila Unni
- Nedumudi Venu as Rtd.Col.T.Pappachen
- Jagathy Sreekumar as E.C Narayanankutty
- Suraj Venjaramoodu as Gopalakrishnan
- Kalasala Babu as K.Ramachandran Kurup
- K. P. A. C. Lalitha as Sarasamma
- Kalpana
- Jaffer Idukki
- P. Sreekumar as Gopy
- Ponnamma Babu
- Madhu Warrier
- Jose Thettayil MLA
- Aniyappan

== Soundtrack ==
The soundtrack for the film was composed by Mohan Sithara.

Kaanakombathu

Soundtrack album by Mohan Sithara
- Released: 2011
- Genre: Film Soundtrack

No.	Title	Singer(s)	Length
1.	"Unaruka"	K. J. Yesudas	4:40
2.	"Raadha Madhavathin"	Madhu Balakrishnan, Jyotsna Radhakrishnan	5:00
3.	"Doorathoru"	P. Shankar Narayan	4:30
4.	"Vaazhka"	Master Govind	4:56
5.	"Ondhachan"	Sherdhin Thomas, Jisha Naveen	4:23
