= Marmaram =

- Poster designed by Bharathan
- Directed by: Bharathan
- Written by: Bharathan
- Story by: Vijayan Karote
- Produced by: N. N. Films
- Starring: Nedumudi Venu; Bharath Gopi; Jalaja; KPAC Lalitha
- Cinematography: K. Ramachandra Babu
- Edited by: N. P. Suresh
- Music by: M. S. Viswanathan
- Distributed by: Vijaya Movies Release
- Release date: 5 November 1982
- Running time: 129 minutes
- Country: India
- Language: Malayalam

Marmmaram is a 1982 Indian Malayalam-language film, directed by Bharathan. The film stars Nedumudi Venu, Bharath Gopi, Jalaja, and KPAC Lalitha . Its musical score is by M. S. Viswanathan. The film won the Kerala State Film Awards, including Best Lyrics for Kavalam Narayana Panikkar.

== Plot ==
Narayana Iyer / Nanu is a Tamil Brahmin school headmaster who comes to a Mattupetty Estate, hill station school on transfer. He is accompanied by his mother and sister. Nanu starts to bring more discipline into the wayward school and makes it more organized. He is smitten by the music teacher Nirmala and soon both fall in love with each other. Iyer brings home Nirmala and introduces her to the family. He even goes to the lengths of canceling her transfer by influencing the DEO during his sister's wedding. He finally professes his love to her, only for Nirmala to reveal that she's already married and has a son from that marriage who now lives with her father, and she visits in between. Her husband is a Naxalite on the run from the police, and he has been on the run for four years without any information. They had a family life for close to two years, only after which he took up arms and became an extremist. Nirmala doesn't know whether he is dead or alive or behind bars, since there's a bounty on his head by the government. Iyer is confused for a while but finally decides to marry her at his colleague Devan's advice. He brings home Nirmala who is hesitantly accepted by Nanu's mother. One day, Nirmala receives a telegram informing her that her son is ill and admitted to the hospital. Nirmala takes a reluctant Iyer to the hospital to be with her son, and Iyer eventually returns to school. He's upset when Nirmala is not yet back after a week. She finally arrives with her son to Iyer's house saying that she was late since the hospital discharged her son now only. Iyer's mother leaves home when he breaks the news to her that Nirmala has a kid from her first marriage. Iyer is upset at the turn of events but eventually warms up to Nirmala's son. One night, when they return home, they find that Nirmala's first husband, Gopi, has come to their house to see her and his son. Iyer lets him inside and asks Nirmala to serve him food. Gopi is on the run from police after a jailbreak and fears for his life. He leaves the house after food, telling both Iyer and Nirmala that he is happy at the turn of events. Just as he leaves their compound into the darkness, he is shot dead by the police. A helpless Nirmala breaks down and is consoled by Iyer.

== Cast ==
- Nedumudi Venu as Narayana Iyer
- Bharath Gopi as Gopi, Nirmala's Husband
- Jalaja as Nirmala
- KPAC Lalitha as Thressayamma
- Jose as Devan
- Aroor Sathyan
- Lalithasree as Mrs. Sheshadri
- Master Anoop
- Meena as Narayana Iyer's Mother
- Prathima
- Sairabhanu
- Vanchiyoor Radha
- Savithri

== Soundtrack ==
The music was composed by M. S. Viswanathan and the lyrics were written by Kavalam Narayana Panicker.

| No. | Song | Singers | Lyrics | Length (m:ss) |
|---|---|---|---|---|
| 1 | "Angam Prathi Anangan" | S. Janaki, Unni Menon | Kavalam Narayana Panicker | |
| 2 | "Karnaamritham Kannanu" | S. Janaki | Kavalam Narayana Panicker | |
| 3 | "Om" | S. Janaki | Kavalam Narayana Panicker | |
| 4 | "Vattathil Vattaaram" | S. Janaki, Chorus | Kavalam Narayana Panicker | |
