= Alice: A True Story =

- Directed by: Anil Das
- Written by: Anil Das
- Produced by: Baby Thotian
- Starring: Rahul Madhav; Priyamani; Prathap Pothan
- Cinematography: M J Radhakrishnan
- Edited by: K. Rajagopal
- Music by: Bijibal
- Production company: Continental Star
- Release date: 21 February 2014
- Country: India
- Language: Malayalam

Alice: A True Story is a Malayalam psychological film scripted and directed by Anil Das. The Film is about a woman who develops a split personality - a condition called fugue. It is the first time that this subject was addressed in Indian cinema.

== Cast ==
- Rahul Madhav as Melvin Immanuel
- Priyamani as Alice/Uma
- Prathap Pothen as Dr Sivapanchanathan
- Sreeraman as Sabapathi
