= Amma Ariyan =

1986 film by John Abraham

- Directed by: John Abraham
- Starring: Joy Mathew; Maji Venkatesh
- Cinematography: Venu
- Edited by: Beena Paul
- Music by: Sunitha
- Production company: Odessa Collective
- Release date: 25 December 1986
- Running time: 115 minutes
- Country: India
- Language: Malayalam

Amma Ariyan (transl. To mother) is a 1986 Indian Malayalam-language experimental film directed by John Abraham. The story revolves around the incidents following the death of a young Naxalite, upon whose death his friends travel to the village where his mother lives to inform her of the death of her only son.

Amma Ariyan is considered to be a complex movie and was one of the biggest experiments in Indian cinema when funds were raised to make a film without giving the slightest heed to its commercial viability. Since its release in 1986, critics have read several layers of meaning in its story. The film was the only South Indian film to feature on British Film Institute's Top 10 Indian Films list.

Amma Ariyan was screened at 64th New York Film Festival on September 26, October 6 and on October 8 at the Howard Gilman Theatre, New York. The film was also screened at the Cannes Film Festival as part of the Cannes Classics section.

== Plot ==
Preparing to leave for Delhi, Purushan bids his mother goodbye, promising to write to her regularly. In the thinly populated forest area of Wayanad in northeast Kerala, the jeep in which he is traveling is stopped by the Police, who take possession of it to carry a dead body found hanging on the wayside tree. The dead man's face looks familiar to Purushan. He becomes restless and is seized with a pathological obsession to find out the identity of the deceased. Against the wishes of his girlfriend, he abandons his trip to Delhi and sets out to seek his friends who may have some clue. Purushan meets journalist friends, doctors, and finally a veteran comrade, fondly addressed as Balettan who identifies the dead as the fellow musician who accompanied Satyajit, the guitarist. Satyajit confirms the deceased is his friend Hari, the tabla player. Together they decide to inform Hari's mother who stays in Cochin. They set out on a long eventful journey from the northern highlands of Wayanad to the Southern port city of Cochin.

As they move from Kozhikode to Beypore, Kodungalloor, Thrissur, Kottapuram, Vypin, and finally to Fort Kochi, the group swells as they meet many mothers and their sons and relatives who have known Hari; some had known him as a tabla player, some as Tony, the jazz drummer, and others as a silent political activist, a victim of police brutality, and a loner. And for others, he was a drug addict and one who used to drown his sorrow and pain in his music. Through their recollections, Hari's rather diffused identity unfolds. His classmates remember Hari as an introvert, weak and indecisive. His worker comrades identify him as a staunch revolutionary with strong resistance and willpower. But then what went wrong?

The colonial past of the places, what they took from us and what they left behind as well as the people's protests and uprisings, the region witnesses, and their heroes and victims are integrated into the narrative, by way of information as well as critique.

While reporting to his mother about Hari and his friends and their mothers on his southbound journey, John also reconstructs the history of the land through a series of class struggles, student protests, and workers union clashes that took place in the region where Purushan traversed. Starting with the medical students agitation against commercialization of medical education, to a short dialogue with Karuppuswamy, the unfortunate victim who had lost both his legs in a colliery workers struggle for better wages and human dignity, in Kottapuram, to Vypin island where several mazdoors (labourers) either died or lost their eyesight in the man-made hooch tragedy, to the Citizens group's forcible taking over of rice and sugar hoarded by unscrupulous black marketer traders and distributing to ordinary people at fair prices and giving back the money collected to the traders, to the manipulated fight between workers of two feuding unions in a Mattancherry street in Fort Kochi, where four fishermen had died, and also some targeted working-class leaders in a fake Police encounter, an abortive factory workers strike extending solidarity to the retrenched women workers in Fort Kochi, are some of the long list of peoples protests and struggles reported with deep concern and feeling by Purushan in a long letter to his Mother.

As Purushan and his group wait for Hari's mother to come out of the Baptism ceremony from the church, they analyze their own past, noting the emerging debate focusing on the romantic evasions and tragic failures of the extremist movement. When Hari's mother finally turns up and faces the youth congregation, she asks "Suicide wasn't it?" The film ends with Purushan's mother watching Hari's mother wiping her tear.

== Cast ==
- Kunhulakshmi Amma as Purushan's mother
- Harinarayan as Hari
- Joy Mathew as Purushan
- Maji Venkitesh as Paru
- Nilambur Balan

== Production ==
The incidents that led to the production of Amma Ariyan are striking. A group of young friends of John Abraham who wanted to make it into a "people's movie", constituted the Odessa Collective, aiming at production and exhibition of good cinema with active participation of the general public, without the intervention of market forces.

They raised money for the film by traveling from village to village and house to house, beating drums, singing and putting up skits and short plays at street corners and asking for contributions for the 'people's cinema'. They collected the fund needed for the production of a movie. It was Odessa's first film and John's last Amma Ariyan re-wrote all the conventions of filmmaking.

The film is made in a documentary style. As a part of the technique of intertwining fact and fiction, the filmmaker shot many actual leftist political strikes that took place in Kerala during that time.

== Awards ==
- National Film Award for Best Cinematography - Venu
