= Vidhyarthikale Ithile Ithile =

- Poster
- Directed by: John Abraham
- Screenplay by: M. Azad
- Story by: John Abraham
- Produced by: Minnal
- Starring: Madhu; Jayabharathi; Adoor Bhasi
- Cinematography: Ramachandra Babu
- Edited by: Ravi
- Music by: M. B. Sreenivasan
- Production company: Mehboob Movies
- Release date: 19 May 1972
- Country: India
- Language: Malayalam

Vidhyarthikale Ithile Ithile is a 1972 Indian Malayalam-language comedy film and the directorial debut of John Abraham. It is based on the French film Portrait of Innocence (1941; based on Erich Kästner's 1928 novel Emil and the Detectives). The film stars Madhu, Jayabharathi, and Adoor Bhasi. The film had musical score by M. B. Sreenivasan.

== Cast ==
- Madhu-Thomas
- Jayabharathi-Susie
- Adoor Bhasi
- Manorama- Manorama
- Master Vijayakumar
- Paravoor Bharathan
- S. V. Ranga Rao
- S. P. Pillai-Palmist Nataraj
- T. K. Balachandran -Johnie
- M. R. R. Vasu
- Kuthiravattom Pappu- Appu

== Soundtrack ==
The music was composed by M. B. Sreenivasan and the lyrics were written by Vayalar Ramavarma.

No.	Song	Singers	Lyrics	Length (m:ss)
1	"Chinchilam Chiluchilam"	Adoor Bhasi, Manorama	Vayalar Ramavarma	
2	"Nalanda Thakshashila" (F)	S. Janaki, Chorus	Vayalar Ramavarma	
3	"Nalanda Thakshashila" (M)	K. J. Yesudas	Vayalar Ramavarma	
4	"Velichame Nayichaalum"	S. Janaki, Chorus	Vayalar Ramavarma	
