= Bharathan Effect =

- DVD cover
- Directed by: Anil Das
- Written by: Madhu Muttam
- Produced by: Suresh Kozhenchery
- Starring: Biju Menon; Geetu Mohandas; Jayakrishnan
- Cinematography: Ramachandra Babu
- Edited by: K. Rajagopal
- Music by: Score: Ouseppachan; Songs: M. Jayachandran
- Production company: Nandhakishora Films
- Release date: 29 June 2007
- Country: India
- Language: Malayalam

Bharathan Effect is a 2007 Indian Malayalam-language science fiction film written by Madhu Muttam, directed by Anil Das, and starring Biju Menon in the title role. It is about a genius inventor who makes a small gadget which can fly without fuel using the concept of antigravity.

== Cast ==
- Biju Menon as Bharathan
- Geetu Mohandas as Geetha
- Jayakrishnan as Thankachan
- Jagathy Sreekumar as Kariyachan
- Ponnamma Babu as Alice, Kariyachan's wife
- Sudheesh as Peter
- Ajith S. Nair as Koshi Kunju (Businessman & Karia's relative)
- Innocent as George, Thankachan's father
- Kalpana as Nancy, Thankachan's mother
- Rajan P. Dev as Fr. Stephen
- Suresh Gopi as Dr. G.R. Pandala, the psychiatrist (Special appearance)

== Reception ==
A critic from Indiaglitz.com said that the film "has not eyed anything exceptional other than the central plot, and would have worked better if it was promoted as a children's film!" Paresh C Palicha of Rediff.com concluded his review saying, "In all, Anil Das's Bharathan Effect would have worked wonders if it was made 20 years ago, and promoted as a children's film!" The film received a few positive reviews as well. G. Jayakumar of The Hindu appreciated the film "for the treatment of an unusual theme." He also praised the technical aspects and the cast performances.

== See also ==
- Science fiction film of India
