= Anand Swaminathan =

Professor and Academic, Business Management and Organization

Anand Swaminathan is an Indian-American researcher and academic. He is the Robert C. Goizueta Chair of Organization and Management and served as the Associate Dean of the Ph.D. program at Emory University's Goizueta School of Business from 2011-2017. Previously, he held academic appointments at the University of Michigan School of Business and the University of California, Davis.

== Education and career ==
Dr. Swaminathan received his Bachelor of Technology in Mechanical Engineering with the University Merit Scholarship for all years at the National Institute of Technology, Warangal, in 1982, P.G.D.M. (equivalent to an M.B.A.) in Marketing and Organizational Behavior with the Duncan Scholarship in 1984 at the Indian Institute of Management, Calcutta, and a Ph.D. in Business Administration at the University of California, Berkeley.

== Research ==
Dr. Swaminathan, regarded as an "organization studies scholar", is best known for his work on the effectiveness of the NFL's Rooney Rule, the microbrewery movement and the U.S. brewing industry, mining software repositories, and the American Wine industries. His research on the NFL, along with his coauthors Christopher Rider, James Wade, and Andreas Schwab, led to wide scale scrutiny of the football league's diversity policies.

Dr. Swaminathan's other research areas include organizational theory and strategy, people analytics, interorganizational and social networks, industry evolution, small firm strategies, and organizational change and its consequences.

=== Most cited works ===
Dr. Anand Swaminathan has 10,500 citations. His three most cited works (according to Google Scholar), in decreasing order of citations were:

1. Why the microbrewery movement? Organizational dynamics of research partitioning in the U.S. brewing industries (with Glen R. Carroll, the Adams Distinguished Professor of Management at Stanford University).
2. Mining email social networks.
3. Framing interorganizational network change: A network inertia perspective.

== Awards ==
- Donald R. Keough Award for Excellence by Emory University (2023)
- Distinguished Alumnus Award for Professional Excellence by the National Institute of Technology, Warangal
