= Venkat Swaminathan =

Tamil writer and literary critic

Venkat Swaminathan (1 June 1933 - 21 October 2015) was a Tamil writer and popular literary critic. Born in Udaiyalur near Kumbakonam, he worked in the Intelligence Bureau (IB) and spent his professional life in Delhi. Post-retirement, he lived in Chennai and moved to Bangalore after his wife's death. He died in 2015 and is survived by a son.

C. S. Chellappa and Ka. Naa. Subramanyam brought Swaminathan to the literary field, and his first work was published in Ezhuthu run by Chellappa. He also brought out his own magazine Yatra. He was writing from 1959 till his death in 2015.
