= Anil Das =

- Born: Kottayam, Kerala, India
- Occupations: Director; scriptwriter
- Years active: 1995–present

Anil Das is a Malayalam film director and screenwriter from Kerala, India.

His debut movie was Sargavasantham (1995), written by the Kakkanadan. Another movie of Anil Das was Alice - A True Story (2014). The movie had a star cast consisting of Priyamani, Rahul Madhav, and Pratap Pothen.

== Filmography ==
- Sargavasantham (1995)
- Bharathan Effect (2007)
- Alice : A True Story (2014)
