= Exorcism in Hinduism =

In many Hindu traditions, it is believed that people can be possessed by entities such as Bhoot, Pret, Pisach, Dain, Nishi, and Jatak. Exorcism is used to remove the possessing entity. The exorcism is often done by use of mantras – chanting of phrases from Hindu Vedic scriptures to a deity. This is sometimes accompanied by a yajna, a sacred fire, where a special hawan or sacrificial offering with special ingredients is performed for the rite.

== Places of exorcism ==
Some temples in India host exorcism rituals. Among the eight temples known for exorcism practices are Kamakhya Temple in Assam, Tarapith Temple in West Bengal, Dattatrya Mandir of Karnataka, and Mehandipur Balaji Temple in Rajasthan.

== The exorcism ==
In Vaishnavism, exorcisms are performed by reciting names of Narasimha, as he is considered a fierce god who eliminates and vanquishes evil spirits.

In Natha Sampradaya, Kaal Bhairav is another fierce god, a manifestation, or avatar of Shiva. Many mantra and rituals are used by Nath's to perform exorcism. Some Mantras also known as Shabar Mantra are greatly used.

Some people also consider chanting or reading the devotional hymn of Hanuman Chalisa for protection from evil spirits and negativity and to evict these. Hanuman is considered very powerful and many evil spirits and entities are terrified of his presence, as he is the most devoted and loved devotee of Rama.

=== Mantras ===
Several mantras from different deities are used for the act of exorcism.

As per Shakti Upasana (devotion to the Divine Feminine) the mantras of Kali, Tara and Bhairavi are used they are referred as the supreme goddesses to vanquish all kind of evil entities and spirits and often a sacrificial ritual involving animal sacrifice (bali or pashubali) is done to complete the observance. In Tantra or tantric sect this method of exorcism is highly accepted.
