= Padmini Swaminathan =

Indian feminist economist

Academic background
- Education: University of Bombay

Academic work
- School or tradition: Feminist economics

Padmini Swaminathan is an Indian feminist economist. She is the current chairperson of the Centre for Livelihoods at the Tata Institute of Social Sciences (TISS), Hyderabad. She has also served as the director of the Madras Institute of Development Studies (MIDS) and held the chair for Regional Studies of the Reserve Bank of India at MIDS until her retirement in 2011. Swaminathan studies industrial organization, labour, education and health from a gender perspective.

== Published works ==
- Swaminathan, Padmini (1997). "Work and Reproductive Health: A Hobson's Choice for Indian Women?". Economic and Political Weekly. 32 (43): WS53–WS61. JSTOR 4406008.
- Swaminathan, Padmini; Jeyaranjan, J.; Sreenivasan, R.; Jayashree, K. (2004). "Tamil Nadu's Midday Meal Scheme: Where Assumed Benefits Score over Hard Data". Economic and Political Weekly. 39 (44): 4811–4821. JSTOR 4415741.
- Swaminathan, Padmini (31 October 2009). "Outside the Realm of Protective Labour Legislation: Saga of Unpaid Labour in India". Economic and Political Weekly. XLIV (44): 80–87. JSTOR 25663737.

== See also ==
- Feminist economics
- Unpaid domestic work
