= John Abraham (director) =

Indian film director and screenwriter

- Born: 11 August 1937; Chennamkary, Kuttanadu, Alleppey, Travancore
- Died: 31 May 1987 (aged 49); Kozhikode, Kerala, India
- Education: Mar Thoma College, Tiruvalla; Film and Television Institute of India
- Occupations: Film director, screenwriter

Notes
- "A Wonder in World Cinema" – Adoor Bhasi

John Abraham (11 August 1937 – 31 May 1987) was an Indian filmmaker, short story writer and screenwriter who worked mainly in Malayalam cinema. His film Amma Ariyan (1986) was the only South Indian feature film to make the list of "Top 10 Indian Films" of all time by British Film Institute. Agraharathil Kazhuthai, a 1977 film by Abraham, was listed among the "100 Greatest Indian Films" of all time by IBN Live's 2013 poll.

== Early life ==
John Abraham was born in Chennamkary, Kuttanadu in 1937. He is from the Vazhakkat branch, Chennamkary of the Pattamukkil Family. He completed his intermediate studies in CMS College Kottayam staying with his grandfather, who nurtured John's talent in his early days. After completing his degree in (history and politics) from Mar Thoma College, Tiruvalla, he worked as a private college teacher and latter he joined as an office assistant with Life Insurance Corporation of India in Udupi, Karnataka. After that he joined the FTII, Pune and there he met film-makers such as Ritwik Ghatak and Mani Kaul. John graduated out of the FTII with gold medals in screenwriting and film direction. He entered the film industry working as an assistant director to Mani Kaul for the film Uski Roti (1969, Hindi). He has worked for some Hindi projects that was shot in Kerala, but none were released. John's first attempt in direction came in 1967 named Vidyarthikale Ithile Ithile. It was the Tamil film Agraharathil Kazhuthai (1977) that gave John recognition.

== Career ==
John entered the film industry working as an assistant director to Mani Kaul for the film Uski Roti (1969, Hindi). He has worked for some Hindi projects that was shot in Kerala, but none were released. John's first attempt in direction came in 1967 named Vidyarthikale Ithile Ithile. It was the Tamil film Agraharathil Kazhuthai (1977) that gave John recognition.

He completed only four films, namely Vidyarthikale Ithile Ithile (1972), Agraharathil Kazhuthai (1977, Tamil), Cheriachante Krurakrithyangal (1979, Malayalam) and Amma Ariyan (1986, Malayalam).

=== Odessa Collective ===
Under John, the Odessa Collective came into existence in 1984 with a street drama in Fort Kochi named Nayykali (The game of dogs). Odessa was an attempt by a group of movie enthusiasts to change the history of film production and distribution by making it a collaborative effort with the public and thus act as an empowering and liberating medium. For the financing of the first film produced by Odessa, John and his friends travelled through villages and collected money from the general public. Odessa also collected funds for the film by screening Charlie Chaplin's The Kid. The film, Amma Ariyan (Report to mother) (1986) was exhibited across the state of Kerala on a non-commercial basis, an initiative kept alive, after John's death, by his colleague and co-founder of Odessa Collective, Odessa Sathyan.

He started shooting a documentary based on the life of E.M.S. Namboodiripad, but never completed it.

The media called him Ottayan (The Lone Tusker).

He has left behind a number of complete and incomplete scripts. A collection of his stories had been published under the title Nerchakkozhi. Another collection of his stories has been published posthumously under the title John Abrahaminte Kathakal by Pakshikkottam Books, Thiruvananthapuram in 1993.

== Death ==
On 30 May 1987 John was admitted to the Kozhikode Medical College hospital following his fall from a house top after a party. He was not identified by the hospital authorities, and allegedly not given due attention and medical care, which caused his condition to deteriorate, leading to his death on 31 May. Following the allegations of medical negligence, a departmental inquiry was conducted into the incident. 26 years after John's death, social activist B. Ekbal who was a surgeon at the Kozhikode Medical College when John was admitted for treatment, revealed that the director could have been saved if his identity was known to the doctors at the time of admission. He said the doctors at the casualty did not know John and mistook him for a film representative when he said that he was a filmmaker. In a Facebook post, Ekbal said the doctors failed to diagnose internal bleeding suffered by John and to check his blood pressure which could have prevented him from slipping into a shock through a timely surgery.

== Filmography ==
Documentaries

- 1967: Koyna Nagar – Director (in English) – Unreleased
- 1969: Priya – Director (in Hindi) – (John's Diploma film at FTII, Pune)
- 1969: Hides and Strings – Director (in English)

Feature films

- 1972: Vidyarthikale Ithile Ithile (This Way, Students) – Director (in Malayalam)
  - Screenplay: M Azad — Cast: Madhu, Adoor Bhasi, Manorama, S. V. Ranga Rao, Jayabharathi, S. P. Pillai – Cinematography: Ramachandra Babu – Music: M. B. Sreenivasan
- 1977: Agraharathil Kazhuthai (Donkey in the Elite Colony) – Director and screenwriter (in Tamil)
  - Screenplay: Venkat Saminathan – Cast: M. B. Sreenivasan, |Swathi, Savitri, Raman Veeraraghavan – Cinematography: Ramachandra Babu – Art Director: Jeevan Thomas — Music: M. B. Sreenivasan
- 1979: Cheriyachante Kroorakrithyangal (Cruelties of Cheriyachan) – Director and screenwriter (in Malayalam)
  - Cast: Adoor Bhasi, Kaviyoor Ponnamma, Poornima Jayaram, Abraham Joseph, Venu – Cinematography: Madhu Ambat – Music: Johnson
- 1986: Amma Ariyan (Report to Mother) – Director and screenwriter (in Malayalam)
  - Cast: Joy Mathew, Maji Venkitesh, Nilambur Balan, Harinarayanan, Sara Thomas – Cinematography: Venu – Music: Sunitha

== Books ==
- Nerchakkozhi (1986)
- John Abrahaminte Kathakal (1993)

== Awards ==
National Film Awards:

- 1977 – Best Feature Film in Tamil – Agraharathil Kazhuthai
- 1986 – Special Jury Award – Amma Ariyan

Kerala State Film Awards:

- 1979 – Special Jury Award – Cheriyachente Kroora Krithyangal

== Legacy ==
According to one reviewer, John Abraham has influenced an entire generation of filmmakers to think and create content beyond the ordinary. He's one of the founding fathers of Independent Cinema in Malayalam.

=== John Abraham Award ===
The Federation of Film Societies of India – Kerala instituted the John Abraham Award for Best Malayalam Film in 1998. The John Abraham National Awards for Documentary and Short Features are awarded since 2005 for the best documentary and short feature screened in the SIGNS, festival organised by Federation of Film Societies of India – Kerala.
