= List of Malayalam film actors =

This list outlines the names of notable male lead film actors, who previously worked or are currently working in the Malayalam film industry, based in Kerala, India. The list is ordered by the year of their debut as a leading actor or the year of their landmark film. Actors who have starred in at least five films as lead are included in the list.

== 1930s ==
Year	Name	Debut film	Other notable films
1938	K. K. Aroor	Balan	Gnanambika (1940), Kerala Kesari (1950), Genova (1953)

== 1940s ==
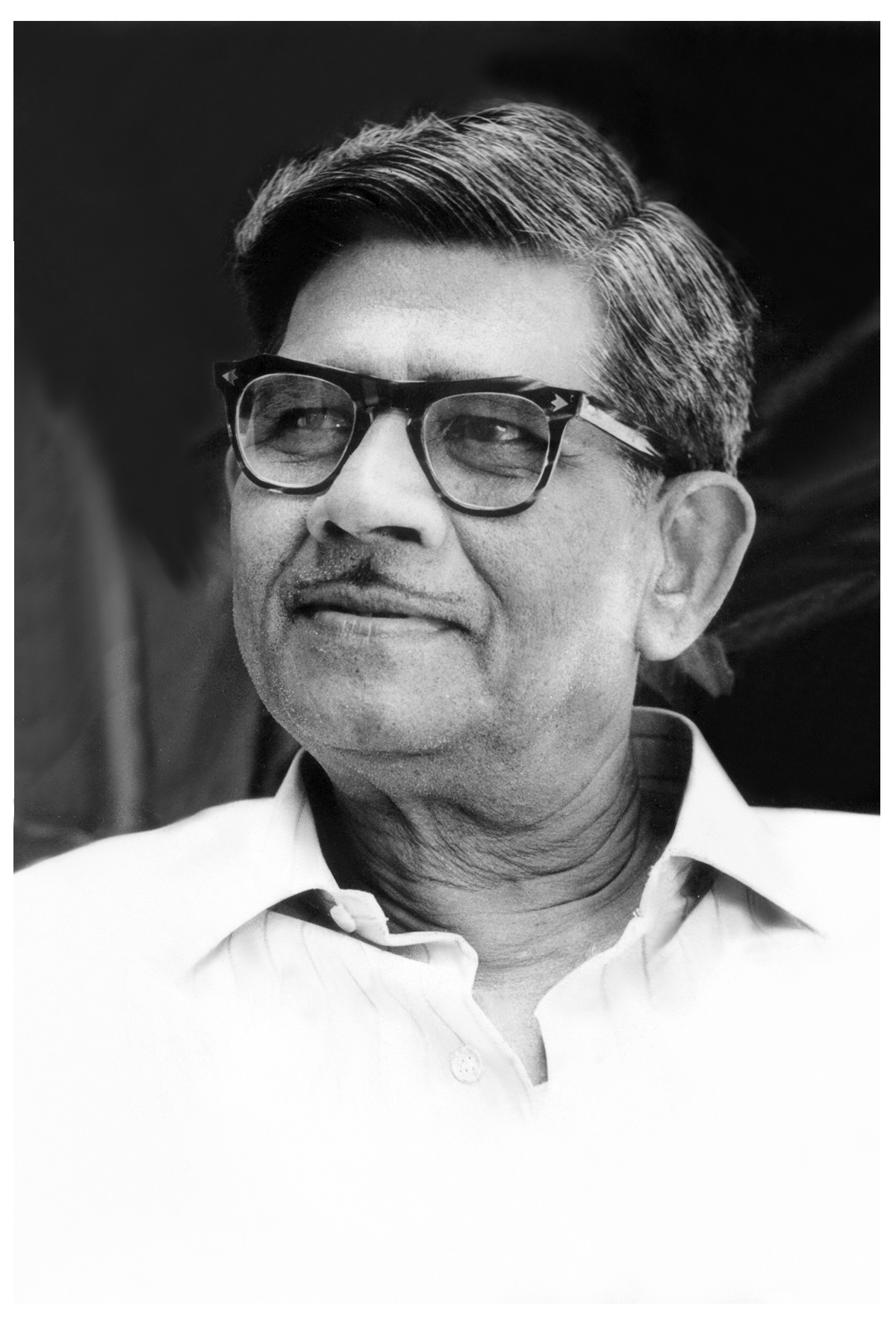
Sebastian Kunju Kunju Bhagavathar

Year	Name	Debut film	Other notable films
1940	Sebastian Kunjukunju Bhagavathar	Gnanambika	Navalokam (1951), Sheriyo Thetto (1953), Vidhi Thanna Vilakku (1962)

== 1950s ==
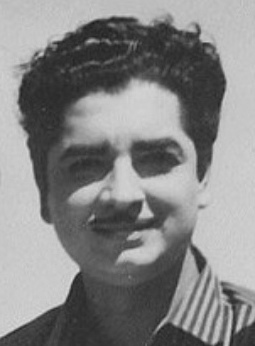
Prem Nazir

Year	Name	Debut film	Other notable films
1952	Prem Nazir	Marumakal	Murappennu (1965), Udhyogastha (1967), Iruttinte Athmavu (1967), Kallichellamma (1969), Virunnukari (1969)
1952	Sathyan	Athmasakhi	Anubhavangal Palichakal (1971), Karinizhal (1971), Kadalpalam (1969), Yakshi (1968)
1953	Adoor Bhasi	Thiramala	Thommante Makkal (1965), Kayamkulam Kochunni (1966), C.I.D. Nazir (1971)
1958	P. J. Antony	Randidangazhi	Bhargavi Nilayam (1964) Kurukshethram (1970), Manninte Maril (1979)

== 1960s ==
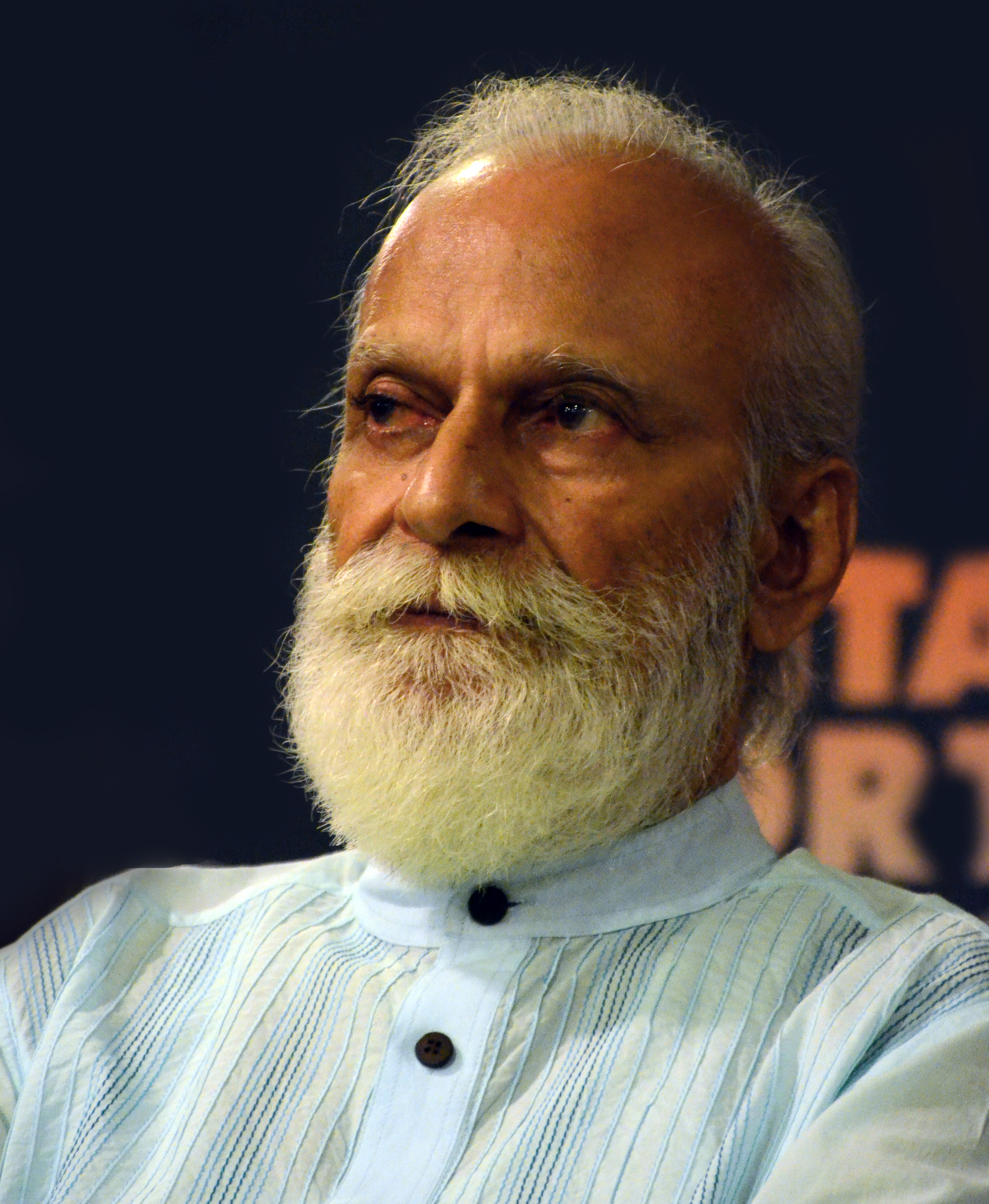
Raghavan

Year	Name	Debut film	Other notable films
1964	Madhu	Bhargavi Nilayam	Chemmeen (1965), Bobanum Moliyum (1971), Geethaanjali (2013)
1968	Raghavan	Kayalkkarayil	Swami Ayyappan (1975), Hridhayathinte Nirangal (1979), Evidence (1998)

== 1970s ==
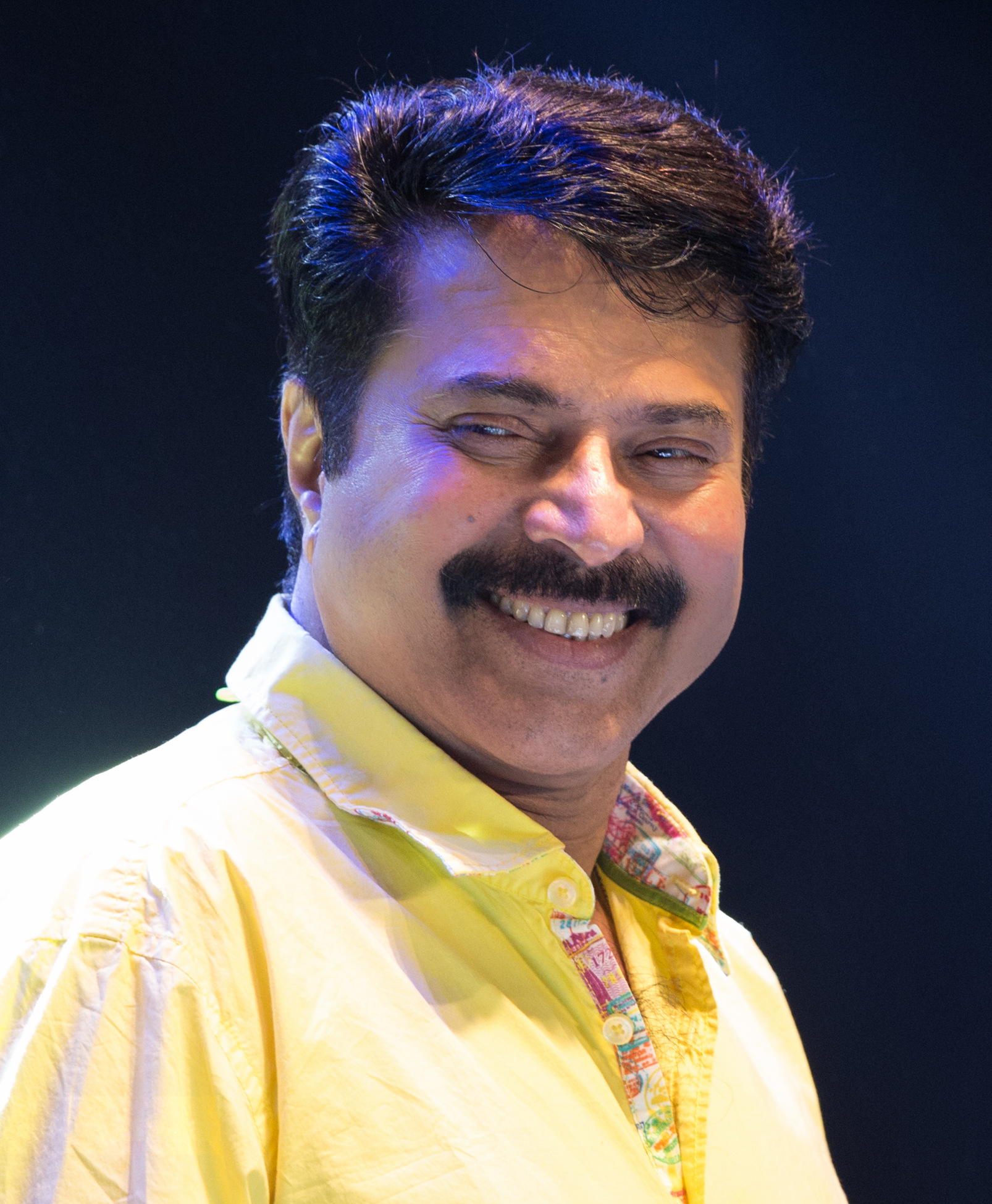
Mammootty

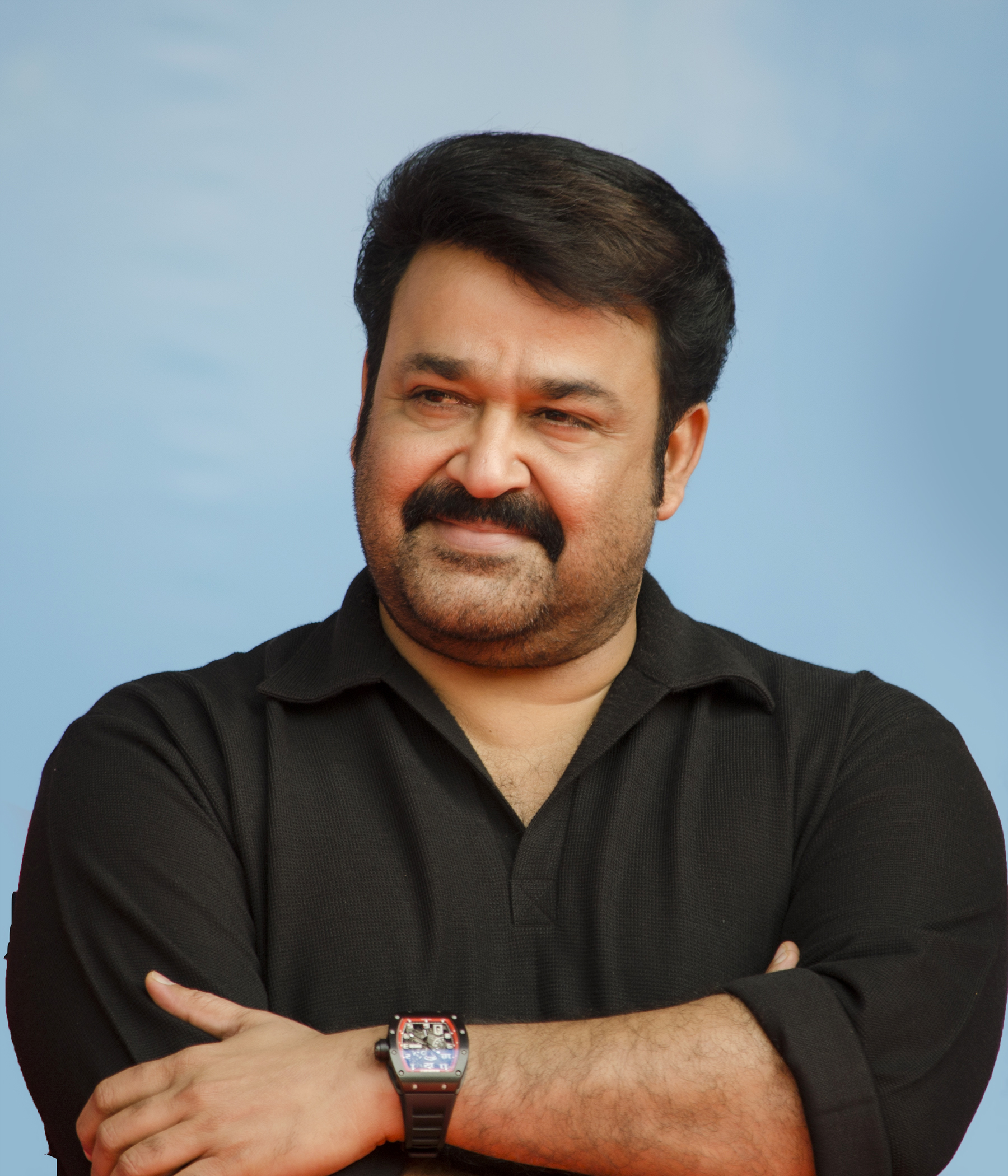
Mohanlal

Year	Name	Debut film	Other notable films
1971	Mammootty	Anubhavangal Paalichakal	New Delhi (1987), Oru Vadakkan Veeragatha (1989), Oru CBI Diary Kurippu (1988), Kottayam Kunjachan (1990), Sethurama Iyer CBI (2004), Rajamanikyam (2005), Big B(2007) Kerala Varma Pazhassi Raja (2009), Bheeshma Parvam (2022), Bramayugam (2024).
1972	Thilakan	Periyar	Kireedam (1989), Spadikam (1995), Narasimham (2000), Pazhassi Raja (2009), Ustad Hotel (2012)
1973	MG Soman	Gayathri,	Manu Uncle (1988), Lelam (1997)
1973	Sukumaran	Nirmalyam	Rajan Paranja Kadha (1978), Angadi (1980), Oru CBI Diary Kurippu (1988)
1976	Jayan	Panchami	Sarapancharam (1979), Angadi (1980), Paalattu Kunjikkannan (1980), Manushya Mrugam (1980)
1976	Sreenivasan	Manimuzhakkam	Aram + Aram = Kinnaram (1985), Kaalapani (1996), Traffic (2011), Aravindante Athidhikal (2018)
1978	Mohanlal	Thiranottam	Chithram (1998),Kireedam (1989), Kilukkam (1991), Devaasuram (1993), Manichitrathazhu (1994), Spadikam (1995), Kaalapani (1996), Guru (1997), Narasimham (2000), Thanmathra(2005), Chotta Mumbai(2007), Drishyam(2013), Pulimurugan (2016), Lucifer (2019).

== 1980s ==
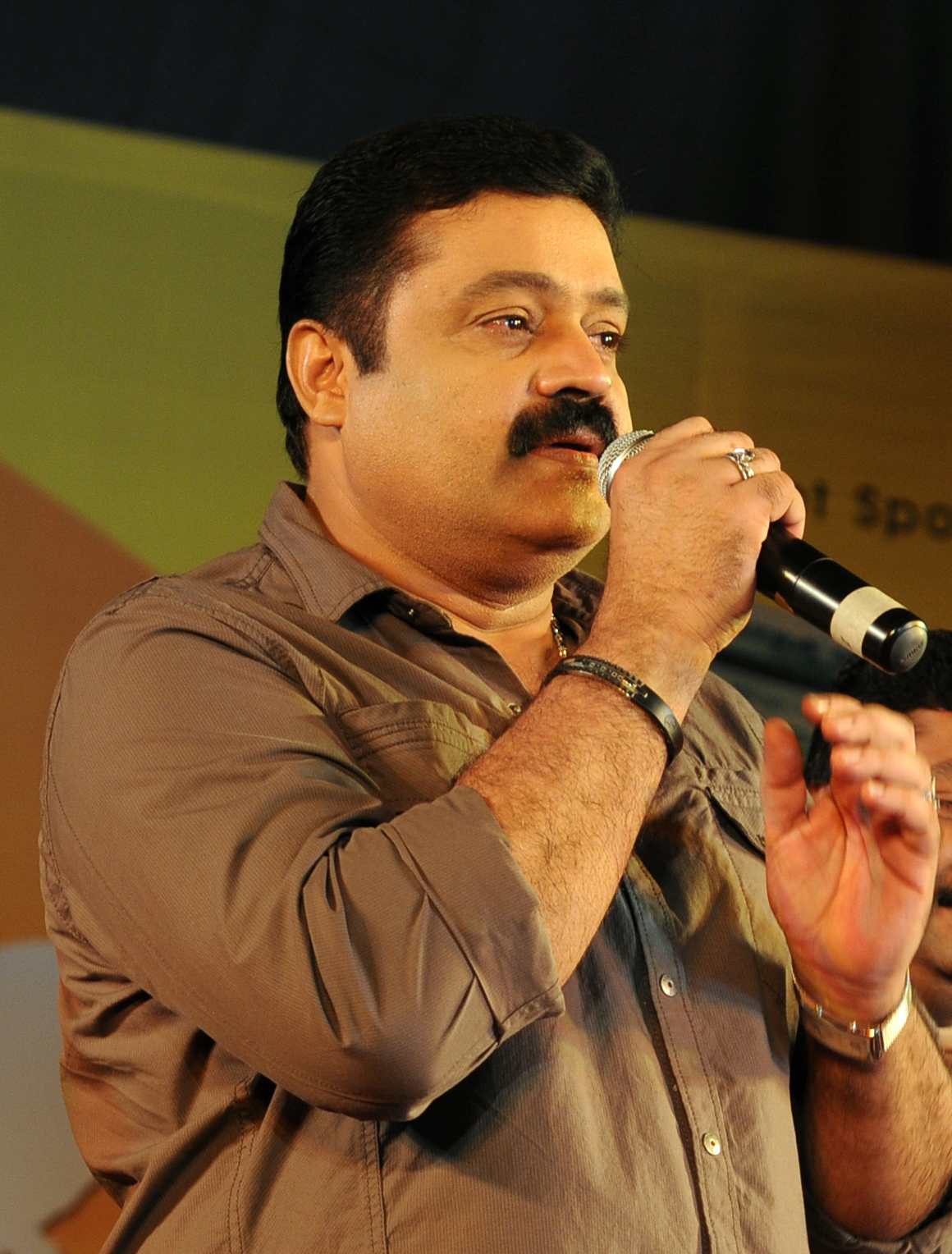
Suresh Gopi

Year	Name	Debut film	Other notable films
1980	Shankar	Manjil Virinja Pookkal	Kadathu (1981), Oothikachiya Ponnu (1981), Ente Mohangal Poovaninju (1982), Veendum Chalikkunna Chakram (1984).
1982	Mukesh	Balloon	Ramji Rao Speaking (1989)., Vandanam (1989), Aakasha Ganga (1999), 2 Harihar Nagar (2009), Philip's (2023)
1986	Suresh Gopi	Niramulla Raavukal	Thalastaanam (1992), Mafia (1993), Thenkasipattanam (2000), Bharathchandran I.P.S. (2005).
1988	Jayaram	Aparan	One Man Show (1990) One Man Show (2001), Winter (2009), China Town (2011), Abraham Ozler (2024)
1989	Saikumar	Ramji Rao Speaking	In Harihar Nagar (1990), Vasanthiyum Lakshmiyum Pinne Njaanum (1990), Chotta Mumbai (2007)

== 1990s ==
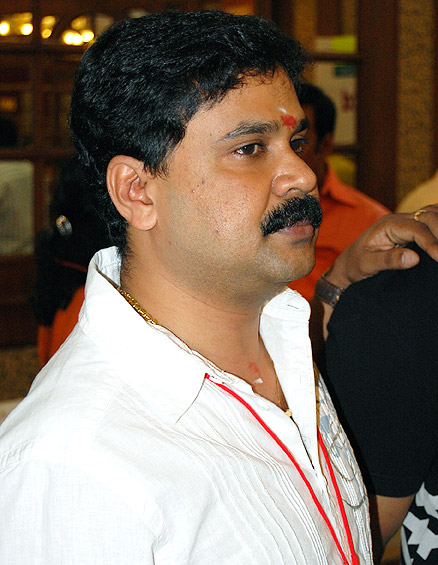
Dileep

Year	Name	Debut film	Other notable films
1994	Dileep	Manathe Kottaram	Punjabi House (1998), Ee Parakkum Thalika (2001), Meesa Madhavan (2002), C.I.D. Moosa (2003), Chanthupottu (2005), My Boss (2012), Two Countries (2015)
1994	Lal	Manathe Kottaram	Thenkasipattanam (2000), Thommanum Makkalum (2005), Salt N' Pepper (2011), 2018 (2023)
1995	Kalabhavan Mani	Aksharam	Vasanthiyum Lakshmiyum Pinne Njaanum (1999), James Bond (1999), Sethurama Iyer CBI (2004), Chotta Mumbai (2007)
1995	Joju George	Mazhavilkoodaram	Action Hero Biju (2016), IDI (2016), Joseph (2018), Iratta (2023), Antony (2023)
1995	Vinayakan	Maanthrikam	Chathikkatha Chanthu (2004), Chotta Mumbai (2007), Kammatipaadam (2016), Jailer (2023)
1997	Kunchacko Boban	Aniyathipraavu	Nakshatratharattu (1998), Niram (1999), Anjaam Pathiraa (2020)

== 2000s ==
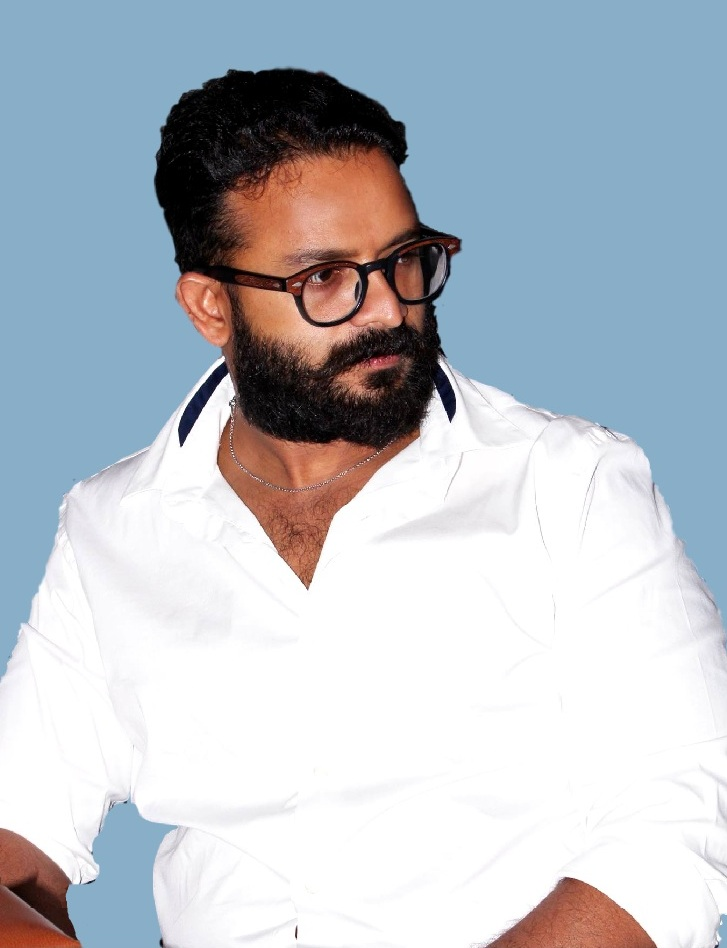
Jayasurya

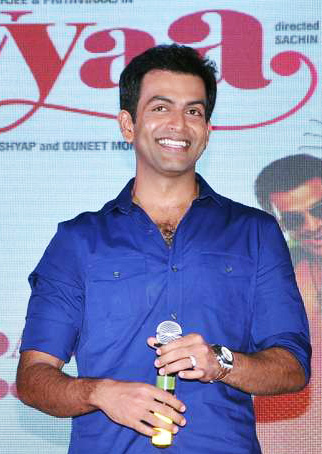
Prithviraj

Year	Name	Debut film	Other notable films
2001	Suraj Venjaramoodu	Ladies & Gentleman	Chattambinadu (2009), Teja Bhai & Family (2011), Android Kunjappan Version 5.25 (2019), Jana Gana Mana (2022)
2002	Jishnu Raghavan	Nammal	Nerariyan CBI (2005), Chakkaramuthu (2006), Ordinary (2012), Ustad Hotel (2012), Annum Innum Ennum (2013)
2002	Prithviraj Sukumaran	Nandanam	Indian Rupee (2011), Celluloid (2013), Memories, Ayyappanum Koshiyum (2020), Jana Gana Mana (2022), The Goat Life (2024)
2002	Indrajith Sukumaran	Oomappenninu Uriyadappayyan	Chanthupottu (2005), Amen (2013), Lucifer (2019)
2002	Jayasurya	Oomappenninu Uriyadappayyan	Pulival Kalyanam (2003), Chathikkatha Chanthu (2004), Chocolate (2007), Classmates (2006), Aadu (2015)
2002	Fahadh Faasil	Kaiyethum Doorath	Amen (2013), Bangalore Days (2014), Njan Prakashan(2018), Joji (2021), Aavesham (2024)
2005	Saiju Kurup	Mayookham	Aadu (2015), Antakshari (2022), Bharathanatyam 2 Mohiniyattam (2026)
2008	Vineeth Sreenivasan	Cycle	Traffic (2011), Kunjiramayanam (2015), Aravindante Athidhikal (2018), Mukundan Unni Associates (2022)
2009	Asif Ali	Ritu	Salt N' Pepper (2011), Honey Bee (2013), Kooman (2022), Kishkindha Kaandam (2024)

== 2010s ==
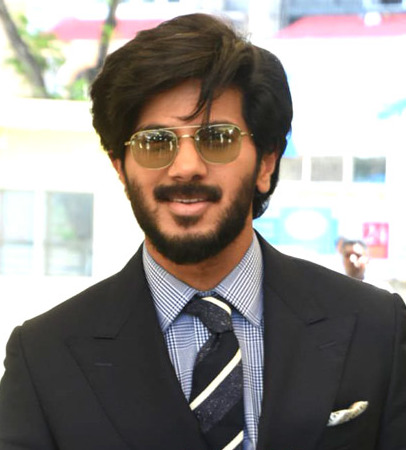
Dulquer Salmaan

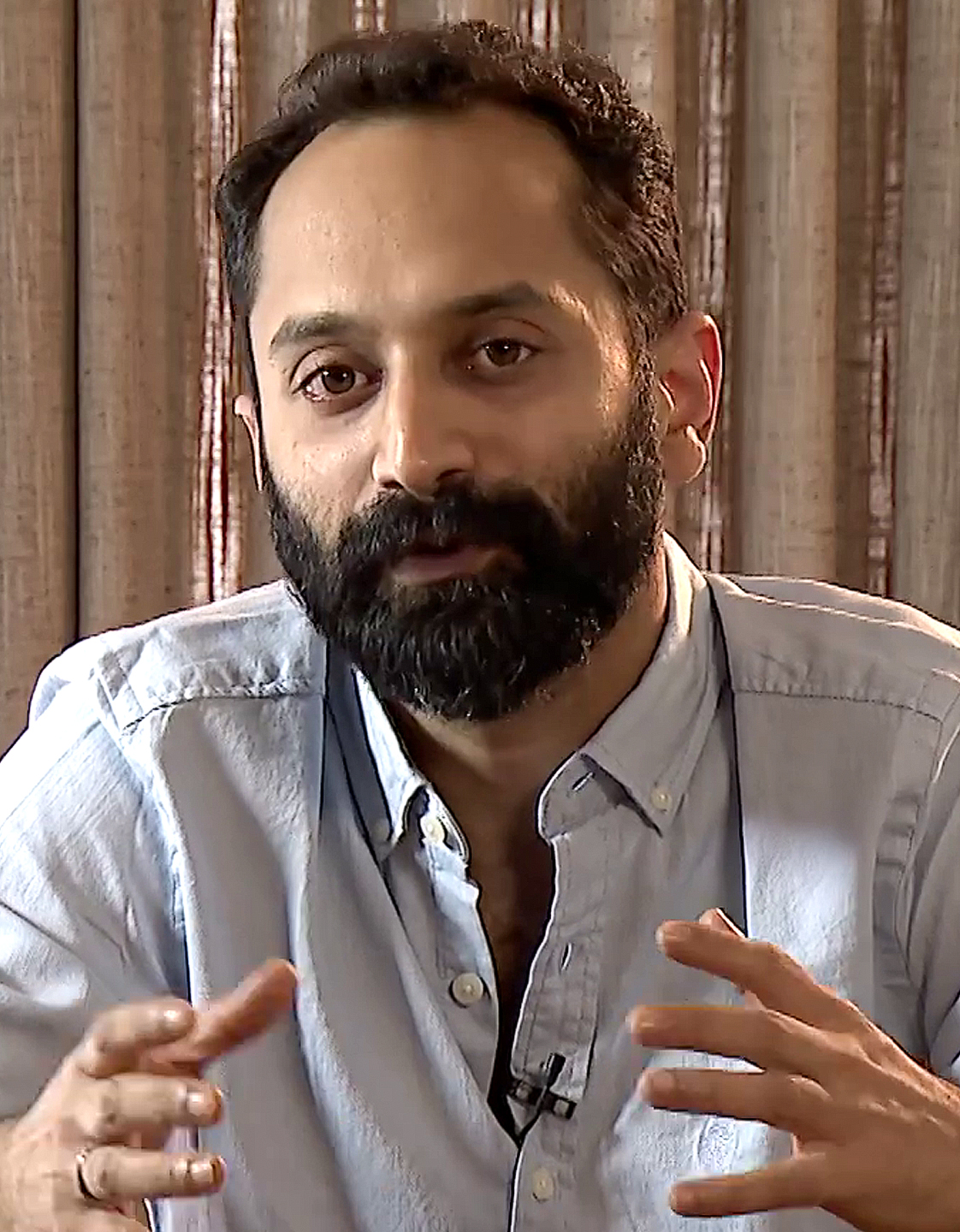
Fahadh Faasil

Year	Name	Debut film	Other notable films
2010	Nivin Pauly	Malarvaadi Arts Club	Thattathin Marayathu (2012), Oru Vadakkan Selfie, Premam (2015), Kayamkulam Kochunni (2018)
2010	Chemban Vinod Jose	Nayakan	Aadu (2015), Ee.Ma.Yau. (2018), Porinju Mariam Jose (2019)
2011	Unni Mukundan	Bombay March 12	Mallu Singh (2012), Style (2016), Malikappuram (2022), Marco (2024)
2011	Sreenath Bhasi	Pranayam	Da Thadiya (2012), Anjaam Pathiraa (2020), Manjummel Boys (2024)
2012	Dulquer Salmaan	Second Show	Ustad Hotel (2012), ABCD (2013), Charlie (2015), Kurup (2021)
2012	Sunny Wayne	Second Show	Aadu (2015), Anugraheethan Antony (2021), Kasargold (2023)
2012	Tovino Thomas	Prabhuvinte Makkal	Minnal Murali (2021), Thallumaala (2022), ARM (2024)
2012	Arjun Ashokan	Orkut Oru Ormakoot	B.Tech (2018), Jan. E. Man (2021), Romancham (2023)
2013	Soubin Shahir	Annayum Rasoolum	Sudani from Nigeria (2018), Kumbalangi Nights (2019), Manjummel Boys (2024)
2013	Neeraj Madhav	Buddy	Adi Kapyare Kootamani (2013), Lavakusha (2017), Gauthamante Radham (2020), RDX (2023)
2013	Sharafudheen	Neram	Pretham (2016), Role Models (2017), Anjaam Pathiraa (2020)
2013	Dhyan Sreenivasan	Thira	Kunjiramayanam (2015), Adi Kapyare Kootamani (2015), Varshangalkku Shesham (2024)
2013	Basil Joseph	Up & Down: Mukalil Oralundu	Jan. E. Man (2021), Jaya Jaya Jaya Jaya Hey (2022), Ponman (2025)
2016	Vishnu Unnikrishnan	Kattappanayile Rithwik Roshan	Oru Yamandan Premakadha (2019), Krishnankutty Pani Thudangi (2021), Sabaash Chandrabose (2022), Vedikettu (2023)
2016	Shane Nigam	Kismath	Parava (2017), Kumbalangi Nights (2019), Bhoothakaalam (2022), RDX (2023)
2017	Antony Varghese	Angamaly Diaries	Jallikattu (2019), Ajagajantharam (2021), RDX (2023)
2018	Pranav Mohanlal	Aadhi	Hridayam (2022), Varshangalkku Shesham (2024), Diés Iraé (2025)
2019	Sandeep Pradeep	Pathinettam Padi	Pathinettam Padi (2019), Falimy (2022), Padakalam(2025)
2019	Naslen	Thanneer Mathan Dinangal	Premalu (2024), Alappuzha Gymkhana (2025), Lokah Chapter 1: Chandra (2025)

== See also ==
- List of highest-grossing Malayalam films
- Lists of Indian actors
- List of Indian male film actors
- List of Malayalam actresses
