= Cosmic Samson =

2026 Indian film

- Directed by: Abhijith Joseph
- Written by: Abhijith Joseph; Abhikersh Vasanth
- Produced by: Sophia Paul; Manuel Cruz Darwin
- Starring: Sandeep Pradeep; Mukesh
- Cinematography: Deepak D. Menon
- Edited by: Chaman Chacko
- Music by: Sibi Matthew Alex
- Production companies: Weekend Blockbusters; D Group
- Distributed by: Weekend Blockbusters; AP International; KVN Productions; Dharma Productions; Home Screen Entertainment
- Release date: 27 November 2026
- Country: India
- Language: Malayalam

Cosmic Samson is an upcoming Indian Malayalam-language fantasy adventure film written and directed by Abhijith Joseph, who co-wrote the script with Abhikersh Vasanth. Produced by Sophia Paul under Weekend Blockbusters in association with Manuel Cruz Darwin of D Group, the film stars Sandeep Pradeep in the titular role, alongside Mukesh, Miya George, Althaf Salim, Alphonse Puthren, Shabareesh Varma, and Anuraj O. B.

The film is scheduled for a worldwide theatrical release on 27 November 2026 in Malayalam, along with dubbed versions in Tamil, Telugu, Hindi, and Kannada.

== Plot ==
Samson Joseph is an aspiring screenwriter trying to establish himself in the film industry while working part-time as a pizza delivery agent. His ordinary routine takes an unexpected turn when mysterious powers thrust him into an extraordinary fantasy adventure.

== Cast ==
- Sandeep Pradeep as Samson Joseph
- Mukesh
- Miya George
- Althaf Salim
- Alphonse Puthren
- Shabareesh Varma
- Anuraj O. B.

== Production ==
=== Development ===
Following his directorial debut John Luther (2022), Abhijith Joseph teamed up with co-writer Abhikersh Vasanth for Cosmic Samson. The project was officially announced on 6 December 2025 as the tenth production venture of Sophia Paul's Weekend Blockbusters, made in collaboration with Manuel Cruz Darwin's D Group and executive producer Bino T. Abraham.

The technical crew includes cinematographer Deepak D. Menon, editor Chaman Chacko, sound designer Vishnu Govind, and production designer Joseph Nellickal. Action choreographer Vlad Rimburg, who previously worked on Weekend Blockbusters' Minnal Murali (2021), was roped in to direct the stunt sequences. Visual effects are handled by Egg White VFX, Mindstein Studios, and I-VFX.

=== Filming ===
Principal photography commenced in December 2025. Filming spanned approximately 80 days and officially wrapped up on 14 April 2026.

== Music ==
The film's soundtrack and background score are composed by Sibi Matthew Alex. The first single, titled "Ulagame Nokku" in Malayalam (sung by K. S. Harisankar), was released on 31 October 2026 alongside dubbed versions in Tamil, Telugu, Hindi ("Ulka Hai Ulka"), and Kannada ("Guduganu Kooda").

== Release ==
Cosmic Samson is scheduled for a worldwide theatrical release on 27 November 2026. Alongside the original Malayalam version, it will release in dubbed Tamil, Telugu, Hindi, and Kannada versions.
