= Vellinakshatram (1949 film) =

1949 Indian Malayalam-language film

- Promotional poster
- Directed by: Felix J. H. Baez
- Screenplay by: Felix J. H. Baez
- Story by: K. Ramakrishna Pillai
- Produced by: Kunchacko; K. V. Koshy
- Starring: Gayaka Peethambaram; P. Lalitha Devi; Alleppey Vincent; K. Ramakrishna Pillai; Kandiyoor Parameshwarankutty; Joseph Mulavana; P. A. Ambujam
- Cinematography: T. G. Sivaram Singh; V. Ramamoorthy
- Edited by: K. D. George
- Music by: B. A. Chidambaranath
- Production company: K & K Productions
- Distributed by: Await Release
- Release date: 14 January 1949
- Country: India
- Language: Malayalam

Vellinakshatram (transl. Silver star) is a 1949 Indian Malayalam-language film written and directed by Felix J. H. Baez, who also handled special effects. It was produced by Kunchacko and K. V. Koshy in their debut production. The film stars Gayaka Peethambaram, P. Lalitha Devi, Alleppey Vincent, K. Ramakrishna Pillai, Kandiyoor Parameshwarankutty, Joseph Mulavana, and P. A. Ambujam. It was the first film produced at Udaya Studios, and also marked the acting debut of Miss Kumari, debut of K. D. George as a film editor, and of B. A. Chidambaranath as a film music composer.

Vellinakshatram was released in theatres on 14 January 1949. No print of the film exists today, making it a lost film. It was the seventh Malayalam-language film to be released in Malayalam cinema.

== Cast ==
- Gayaka Peethambaram as Mohan
- P. Lalitha Devi as Santha
- X. P. Vincent (Alleppey Vincent) as Ananthan
- K. Ramakrishna Pillai as Partner
- Kandiyoor Parameshwarankutty as Retired Justice
- Joseph Mulavana as Manager
- P. A. Ambujam as Leela
- M. T. Mathappan as Govindan
- P. K. Janamma as Lakshmi
- Mrs. Rose as Parvathy Amma
- Baby Girija as Prasanna
- Lilly Punnooran as Janu
- J. G. Punnooran as Captain
- Thresiamma (Miss Kumari) in Flash song

== Reception ==
No print of the film exists today, making it a lost film. No other material, such as print or gramophone recording, is available today except the songbook. At the time of its release, it performed poorly at the box office.
