= Detective Ujjwalan =

2025 Indian film

- Theatrical Release Poster
- Directed by: Indraneel Gopalakrishnan; Rahul G
- Written by: Indraneel Gopalakrishnan; Rahul G
- Produced by: Sophia Paul
- Starring: Dhyan Sreenivasan; Siju Wilson; Rony David Raj
- Cinematography: Premkrishna Akkattu; Sraiyanti Harichandran
- Edited by: Chaman Chakko
- Music by: Songs: Rzee; Sibi Mathew Alex; Score: Sibi Mathew Alex
- Production company: Weekend Blockbusters
- Distributed by: Phars Film; AP International
- Release date: 23 May 2025
- Running time: 124 minutes
- Country: India
- Language: Malayalam
- Box office: ₹5.56 crore

Detective Ujjwalan is a 2025 Indian Malayalam-language mystery comedy film written and directed by Indraneel Gopeekrishnan and Rahul G. The film stars Dhyan Sreenivasan as the titular character, alongside Siju Wilson and Rony David Raj in pivotal roles. It is produced by Sophia Paul under the Weekend Blockbusters banner and it is the second installment of the Weekend Cinematic Universe after Minnal Murali.

The film was officially announced on 3 September 2024 with its title teaser. Principal photography commenced on 17 November 2024 and was shot across various locations in Palakkad district, including Kollengode, Nenmara, Shoranur and Pattambi, and wrapped in December 2024. The film's songs and original score were composed by Rzee. Detective Ujjwalan was released in theatres on 23 May 2025. This movie was a semi hit at box-office.

== Plot ==
Ujjwalan, a young librarian and amateur detective in the peaceful village of Plachikkavu, often assists the local police despite suffering from nyctophobia. The village's tranquility is shattered when school principal Ashokan is murdered by a masked killer. Evidence initially points to a local thief, Anthikkurudan, but he maintains his innocence, and subsequent murders prove the real killer is still at large.

As panic spreads, a Special Investigation Team led by CI Shambhu Mahadev takes over the case. The media dubs the murderer, "Kokkachi" or "The Boogeyman," and Shambhu's growing popularity creates friction with Ujjwalan. After another series of murders, Ujjwalan wrongly suspects Shambhu before evidence clears him. Anthikkurudan later provides crucial eyewitness testimony, prompting Ujjwalan, Shambhu, and the local police to work together.

The investigators stage a fake murder to lure the killer, who is unmasked as Jomon, a local television reporter. Jomon reveals that he grew up with an abusive father and was influenced by a mysterious tutor who introduced him to books about serial killers. After witnessing child abuse reminiscent of his own past, he began murdering abusive men while adopting the identity of the "Boogeyman."

Soon after Jomon's arrest, a threatening note suggests the real killer is still free. Ujjwalan discovers the arrested man is left-handed, unlike the note's writer, leading the police to conclude they captured Jomon's identical twin brother, Jacob, by mistake. The real Jomon is lured into a trap, arrested after a confrontation, and the murders finally end.

Peace returns to Plachikkavu, though its residents remain more cautious than before. Shambhu is praised for solving the case, while Ujjwalan overcomes his fear of darkness and turns his library into a detective consultancy.

In a mid-credits scene, the mysterious tutor smiles after reading news reports about the twins' arrest. A post-credits scene introduces a supernatural figure performing a dark ritual during a lunar eclipse, setting up the events of Jambi (2026).

== Cast ==
- Dhyan Sreenivasan as Ujjwalan
  - Siddhanshu as young Ujjwalan
- Siju Wilson as CI Shambhu Mahadev
- Rony David Raj as SI Sachin
- Kottayam Nazeer as Narayanankutty, Ujjwalan's father
- Seema G. Nair as Leela
- Claire C. John as Snehalatha
- Ameen as Korea Kurian
- Nihal Nizam as Anthikkurudan
- Nibraz Noushad as Kunchacko
- Shahubas as Boban
- Mathew Puthukadan in a dual role as:
  - Jomon
  - Jacob, Jomon’s twin brother
    - Ashwath and Adhav as young Jomon
- Jagadish as Teacher
- Kalabhavan Navas as Ashokan
- Nirmal Palazhi as Chandy
- Srinish Aravind as Gowtham (Cameo)
- Pearle Maaney as Divya (Cameo)

== Production ==
=== Casting ===
Dhyan Sreenivasan was cast in the lead role. The film also stars Siju Wilson, Kottayam Nazeer, Seema G. Nair, Rony David Raj in the supporting roles.

=== Filming ===
Principal photography for Detective Ujjwalan commenced on 17 November 2024, in Kerala. The production began with a traditional pooja ceremony, marking the official start of filming.

The shooting took place across various locations in Palakkad district, including Kollengode, Nenmara, Shoranur, and Pattambi . These settings provided the backdrop for the film's fictional village of Plaachikkaavu, where the story unfolds. Filming concluded in December 2024.

== Soundtrack ==
Detective Ujjwalan

Soundtrack album by Rzee and Sibi Mathew Alex
- Released: 2025
- Genre: Feature film soundtrack
- Length: 13m 44s
- Label: Saregama

The original background score and songs were composed by Rzee. The team announced that the music rights were bagged by Saregama. The song "Batman Avatharam" is composed by Sibi Mathew Alex.

Track listing
| No. | Title | Singer(s) | Length |
|---|---|---|---|
| 1. | "Neptune" | Fejo | 2:47 |
| 2. | "Skilladi" | Anthony Daasan, Rzee | 3:07 |
| 3. | "Aaravano" | Anand Sreeraj, Manu Manjit | 3:04 |
| 4. | "Thoppi Vecha Vallabha" | Vinayak Sasikumar | 2:52 |
| 5. | "Batman Avatharam" | Ann Lilly Jose | 1:54 |
| Total length: | | | 13:44 |

== Controversy ==
In September 2024, the Ernakulam District Court addressed a case that Detective Ujjwalan is citing copyrights. This action was based on a complaint filed by Arun Anirudhan and Justin Mathew, writers of Minnal Murali. Although the film is based on Minnal Murali Universe (Weekend Cinematic Universe - WCU), the complaint was based on the teaser, which was released on 3 September 2024 which had references to characters and places from Minnal Murali. The film was later cleared.

== Release ==
Detective Ujjwalan was released theatrically on 23 May 2025. Earlier it was scheduled to release on 16 May 2025 but was postponed by a week.

The home media streaming rights were acquired by Netflix with streaming beginning from 11 July 2025. Lionsgate Play also acquired the movie and started streaming on 12 September 2025.

== Reception ==
=== Critical response ===
Detective Ujjwalan received mixed reviews from critics.

Anna Mathews of The Times of India rated the film 2.5 out of 5, noting that while Dhyan Sreenivasan's comic charm was evident, the thriller elements were insufficient to sustain the narrative. Anandu Suresh of The Indian Express criticized the film for its lack of originality and predictability, stating that the writing faltered despite some effective atmospheric elements. Conversely, Gayathri Krishna of OTTplay offered a more positive perspective, awarding the film 4 out of 5 stars and describing it as an entertaining investigative thriller with a humorous spin.

=== Box office ===
On its first day, Detective Ujjwalan earned approximately ₹69 lakhs net in India. On the third day, early estimates indicated earnings of ₹1 crore, bringing the opening weekend total to approximately ₹2.47 crore.
