= Alleppey Vincent =

Indian film actor in Malayalam cinema

- Born: Ambalappuzha, Alappuzha district
- Occupation: actor
- Years active: 1938–1984
- Parent(s): Pollayil Vincent, Margarita

Alleppey Vincent was an Indian actor in Malayalam cinema. He acted in Balan (1938), the first talkie made in Malayalam. Actor Sebastian Kunjukunju Bhagavathar was his brother.

== Biography ==
Vincent was born as the youngest child of Pollayil Vincent and Margarita, in Ambalappuzha taluk of Alappuzha district in the Indian state of Kerala. He was the younger brother of Sebastian Kunjukunju Bhagavathar. Both of them had associated with the initial stages of Malayalam cinema. He acted in Balan (1938), the first talkie ever made in Malayalam, as character Shanku. When the proposed heroine, Kunjamma, of the movie Balan eloped with Sundaram Pillai, the assistant director of the movie, he brought the new heroine M. K. Kamalam who was then working as a drama artist at Sebastian Kunjukunju Bhagavathar drama troupe and introduced her to the director of Balan. Vincent was the first person to record his voice in a Malayalam-language film. His words were first recorded words. He uttered the word 'Good Luck everyone' and it gained him name as first speaking person of Malayalam cinema. In the second Malayalam talkie 'Jnanambika' both Alleppey Vincent and Sebastian Kunjukunju Bhagavathar acted. Vincent acted in the film 'Oral Koody Kallanayi' in 1964 with Prem Nazir, S. P. Pillai, T. S. Muthaiah and in 1974 for the film 'Kamini' with Raghavan, Rani Chandra, Kuthiravattam Pappu, Bahadoor etc. Alleppey Vincent was lucky to act with M. G. R. in the Malayalam film 'Genova' in the year 1953. It is the only Malayalam film M. G. R. ever acted.

He together with late T. V. Thomas, Communist leader and minister in the first EMS ministry, had started a film production company, Udaya Pictures, which Kunchacko took over and renamed as Udaya Studio. Vincent even acted in the first film that rolled out from here, Vellinakshtram. They also worked behind Ajantha Studio, Aluva. Vincent was first president of The Kerala Cooperative Cine Society Limited, Alwaye. Sebastian Paul, former Member of Parliament, who has written a biography of him titled Alleppey Vincent: Malayala Cinemayude Snapakan. Vincent was having his own drama troupe based at Alapuzha and have presented several successful plays for a long period.

== Filmography ==
- Balan (1938)
- Gnanambika (1940)
- Vellinakshathram (1949)
- Jenova (1953)
- Oraal Koodi Kallanaayi (1964)
- Periyar (1973)
- Kaamini (1974)
- Aarorumariyaathe (1984)
