= Padayottam =

Padayottam may refer to:

- Padayottam (1982 film), an Indian Malayalam-language epic period drama film
- Padayottam (2018 film), an Indian Malayalam-language black comedy film
