= Chowwera =

Town in Kerala, India

Chowwera is a town near to Aluva. It is part of Sreemoolanagaram panchayat, Aluva taluk, Ernakulam district in the state of Kerala, India.
