= K. D. George =

Indian film editor

Karakkat Domnic George (1908–1991) was an Indian film editor. He started his career as a projector operator in the Indian Military Service, and became a film editor in the Malayalam movie industry. His first film was also the first Malayalam talkie Balan, which was released in 1938. He was the editor of the famous Malayalam film Chemmeen; along with Hrishikesh Mukherjee it was also the first South Indian film to win the Indian President's Gold Medal for the Best Film in 1965. His last film was Ezhu Rathrikal on YouTube, released in 1968. George left the film industry for health reasons and settled in Chowara, Sreemoolanagaram, Ernakulam District in Kerala. In addition to his native Malayalam, he also spoke English, Hindi, Tamil, and Kannada. George also lived in the United States for several years in the late 1980s.

== Personal life ==
He was born in 1908 in Aluva.

K.D. George was married and has two daughters and four sons. His eldest daughter Mercy was married and settled in Chowara. His second son John (Baby) settled in New Jersey, in the USA. His wife, Pouly George, died in 1990. His second son, Tomy, died in 2000. His third son Francis (Berly) and fourth son Joseph (Joji) settled in New Jersey, in the USA. His youngest daughter Molly was married and settled in North Parur. George lived with his family in his own residence until his death in 1991 at the Karakkat House, Palace Road, Chowara, in the Ernakulam District.

== Notable works ==
The following are his notable works:

Editing

- Ezhu Rathrikal (1968)
- Awal (1967)
- Kadathukaran (1965)
- Aadhiya Kiranangal (1964)
- Kudumbini (1964)
- Orral Koodi Kallanaayi (1964)
- Kalayum Kaminiyum (1963)
- Moodupaddam (1963)
- Ninamaninja Kaalpaadukal (1963)
- Snapaka Yohannan (1963)
- Kaalpadukal (1962)
- Shree Rama Pattabhishekam (1962)
- Snehadeepam (1962)
- Bhakta Kuchela (1961)
- Christmas Rathri (1961)
- Padatha Paingili (1957)
- Newspaper Boy (1955)
- Avakashi (1954)
- Avan Varunnu (1954)
- Neelakkuyil (1954)
- Sneehaseema (1954)
- Ponkathir (1953)

As Assistant Editor

- Chemmeen (1965) (assistant editor)

Sound Editing

- Awal (1967) (sound editor)
