= Santhanadevan =

- Directed by: S. Notani
- Screenplay by: N. Mian; T. P. S. Mani
- Story by: N. Mian
- Produced by: T. R. Sundaram
- Starring: G. M. Bashiar; Banumathi; M. R. Radha
- Edited by: P. P. Varughese
- Music by: R. Naidu
- Production company: Modern Theatres
- Release date: 3 June 1939 (India)
- Running time: 3:08:53 (17000 ft.)
- Country: India
- Language: Tamil

Santhanadevan is a 1939 Indian, Tamil language film directed by S. Nottani. The film stars G. M. Bashiar and Banumathi. she is not P. Bhanumathi Ramakrishna

== Cast ==
- G. M. Bashiar
- Banumathi she is not P. Bhanumathi
- M. R. Radha
- P. S. Gnanam
- Jeevarathnam
- Laxminarayan
- Udaiyar

== Production ==
The film was produced by T. R. Sundaram under the banner Modern Theatres and was directed by S. Nottani. D. B. S. Mani wrote the screenplay and dialogues.

== Soundtrack ==
Music was composed by G. Rajagopal Naidu and the lyrics were written by D. B. Velauthasamy. Singers were P. Bhanumathi and U. R. Jeevarathinam.

Song - singer

1. Maarudhale Yaavum - P. Bhanumathi
2. Adhi Param Porule - U. R. Jeevarathinam
3. Kaariyamadhile - U. R. Jeevarathinam
4. Veesudhu Malarin - P. S. Gnanam
5. Dayaa Nithiye - P. Bhanumathi
