= Bhaktha Gowri =

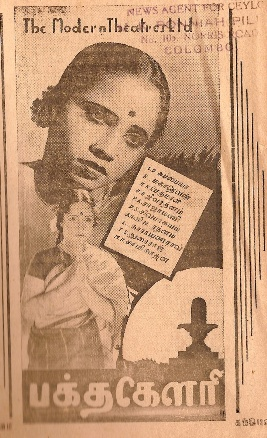
- Directed by: S. Notani
- Screenplay by: D. V. Chari
- Produced by: T. R. Sundaram
- Starring: U. R. Jeevarathinam; S. D. Subbaiah; C. V. V. Panthulu; Kali N. Rathnam; T. S. Durairaj
- Production company: Modern Theatres
- Release date: 5 April 1941 (India)
- Country: India
- Language: Tamil

Bhaktha Gowri (also spelled Bhaktha Gauri) is a 1941 Indian Tamil-language film directed by S. Nottani. The film stars S. D. Subbaiah and U. R. Jeevarathinam.

== Plot ==
Lord Shiva blesses the Saivaite couple (K. K. Perumal and P. A. Rajamani) with a girl child (U. R. Jeevarathinam). The girl falls in love with a Vaishnavaite boy (S. D. Subbaiah). The boy's mother (Paramakudi S. Sivabhaghyam) opposes their love as the girl is a Saivaite. After much trials and tribulations the boy and girl are married with Lord Shiva's blessings who shows to the world that Shiva and Vishnu are one and the same.

== Cast ==
The list is adapted from The Hindu review article.

Male cast

- S. D. Subbaiah
- K. K. Perumal
- C. V. V. Panthulu
- Kali N. Rathnam
- M. R. Swaminathan
- T. S. Durairaj
- L. Narayana Rao

Female cast

- U. R. Jeevarathinam
- P. A. Rajamani
- C. T. Rajakantham
- P. S. Sivabhaghyam

== Production ==
The film was produced by T. R. Sundaram under his own banner Modern Theatres and was directed by S. Notani. P. A. Rajamani who featured as the mother of U. R. Jeevarathinam is the elder sister of actress and playback singer P. A. Periyanayaki. P. S. Sivabhaghyam, better known as Paramakudi Sivabhaghyam was famous for her gramophone records.

== Soundtrack ==
S. Velsamy Kavi penned the lyrics. No single person was credited as the music composer. The group of instrumentalists are:

- T. M. Ibrahim... Organ, Piano
- B. Rangaiah Naidu... Clarinet
- M. K. Nadaraja Bhagavathar... Fiddle
- S. R. Marutha Pillai... Flute
- K. R. Harihara Iyer... Jalatharang
- S. Abdul Khader... Sarangi
- T. P. Chinniah... Tabela
- D. R. Rao... Gadam
- S. P. Ponraj... Udophon

The song "Theruvil varaandi, Velan thaeril varaandi", sung by U. R. Jeevarathinam is a hit even today.

== Reception ==
Randor Guy, writing in 2010 said the film is "Remembered for the melodious music and the hit of the day, Theruvil varaandee'".
