= Ochira Velukkutty =

Indian dramatist

Ochira Velukutty (1905–1954) was an Indian dramatist in the early days of Malayalam theatre. The Malayalam theatre began as an offshoot of Tamil theatre. In South Kerala, the monotony of the sangeetha natakam (musical play) was broken in 1930 by the play Karuna, an adaptation of Kumaran Asan's famous poetic piece. The adaptation was done by Brahmavrathan and the actors Sebastian Kunjukunju Bhagavathar and Ochira Velukutty. This adaptation constituted a radical breakthrough in the 'sangeetha nataka' tradition and its implications were far reaching. It became part of the social reformist movement being led by the precepts of Sree Narayana Guru. It made history, having been staged more than 7,000 times over seven years. The heroine of the story, Vasavadatha, was played by Velukutty and secured him a place in the history of Malayalam theatre.

The role of Ochira Velukutty in the growth of modern Malayalam theatre was enormous. When the age ladies were not ready to come up in drama field, he enacted female roles better than real women. Ochira Parabrahmodaya Nadaka Samathi was formed in his leadership.
