= M. K. Kamalam =

Indian actress

- Born: 1923; Kottayam, Kerala
- Died: 20 April 2010; Kottayam, Kerala
- Occupation: Actress
- Years active: 1923

M. K. Kamalam (1923 – 20 April 2010) was an Indian actress in Malayalam cinema. She was the heroine in the first Malayalam talkie film, Balan (1938).

== Personal life ==
Kamalam was born in 1923 at Kottayam as the third daughter of Kumarakam Mangat Kochupanicker, a music teacher, and his wife Karthyayini.

Aside from acting, she was also active in music. Sebastian Kunjukunju Bhagavathar was her first music teacher. She also trained under Thomas Punnan, Narayanan Bhagavathar, Ochira Raman Bhagavathar, and Kottayam Sankunni Nair.

== Career ==
She appeared in her first play Allirani when she was seven. She acted in it with her father. She got the invitation to act in a movie while she was acting in a play called Vichithravijayam. She was selected from the five ladies who were in the play by director S. Nattani, producer T. R. Sundaram, and actor Alleppey Vincent who were all watching the play. Aged 15, she acted in the first Malayalam "talkie" film, Balan (1938).

Kamalam also sang a trio of songs in her first movie in which the song Jagadeeswara Jayajaya became quite popular. Kamalam's was the first Malayalam voice ever heard on the sound track of a film as her debut film was the first audio movie in the language. Her acting in the movie was considered quite bold because at that time it was uncommon for a woman to act in movies or even in stage plays.

After her appearance in a movie, she went on to become popular in stage plays. Due to her contract with the stage company, she could not take any offers from movies until much when she filmed a movie called Bhootharaayar which was never released due to the death of the producer Thrissur Appan Thampuran. Bhootharaayar was also actor S. P. Pillai's debut film.

Plays in which she appeared include Sree Narayana Guru, Anarkali, Magdalana Mariyam, Kochu Seetha, and Marakkanavatha Manushyan. She retired from acting in 1964 only to return 10 years later to appear in the film, Sayahnam. Her final stage appearance was in Jeevitham Avasanikkunnilla, written by Thrissur Nadaka Kalasamithi.

== Death ==
Kamalam died on 20 April 2010 at Kottayam. She was under treatment at Kottayam Medical College where she fell out of her hospital bed and broke her leg. The exact cause of death has not yet been released. She was 86. She was survived by her husband and three children.
