= Arun Anirudhan =

Indian film director and screenwriter

- Education: Mar Ivanios College
- Occupations: Film director, screenwriter
- Notable work: Athiradi, Minnal Murali

Arun Anirudhan is an Indian screenwriter and film director who primarily works in Malayalam cinema.

== Early life and education ==
Arun Anirudhan studied Engineering and Mass Communication. Before entering the film industry as a screenwriter and director, he worked as an assistant director with filmmaker Khalid Rahman. He was also associated with director Sachy during the making of Anuraga Karikkini Vellam and Anarkali. He was also involved in several short films before making his feature film debut.

== Career ==
Arun Anirudhan began his screenwriting career by co-writing Padayottam (2018). He later co-wrote the superhero film Minnal Murali with Justin Mathew. In 2026, he made his directorial debut with Athiradi Starring Tovino Thomas, Basil Joseph, Vineeth Sreenivasan and Riya Shibu, which was reported to be the fifth highest-grossing Malayalam film of the year at the worldwide box office.

== Filmography ==
Year	Title	Role	Notes	Ref
2018	Padayottam	Screenwriter		
2021	Minnal Murali	Screenwriter	Co-written with Justin Mathew	
2026	Athiradi	Director, Screenwriter		
