= Bethlehem Kudumba Unit (soundtrack) =

2026 film soundtrack album

Soundtrack album by Vishnu Vijay
- Released: 26 August 2026
- Recorded: 2026
- Studios: MLounge Studios, Kochi; 2BarQ Studios, Chennai; 20dB Sound Studios, Chennai; Dravida Studios, Chennai
- Genre: Feature film soundtrack
- Length: 30:29
- Language: Malayalam
- Label: Bhavana Studios
- Producer: Vishnu Vijay

Vishnu Vijay chronology
Athiradi (2026)	Bethlehem Kudumba Unit (2026)	Mela (2027)
External audio
- Bethlehem Kudumba Unit – Full Album on YouTube

Singles from Bethlehem Kudumba Unit
- 1. "Manthrikam" Released: 24 July 2026; 2. "Kobali" Released: 10 August 2026

Bethlehem Kudumba Unit is the soundtrack album composed by Vishnu Vijay to the 2026 Malayalam-language romantic comedy drama film of the same name directed by Girish A. D. and produced by Fahadh Faasil, Dileesh Pothan and Syam Pushkaran under Fahadh Faasil and Friends, Working Class Hero and Bhavana Studios, starring Nivin Pauly and Mamitha Baiju. The album featured 10 songs written by Vinayak Sasikumar and Suhail Koya and released through Bhavana Studios on the occasion of Onam (26 August 2026), where it was preceded by two singles.

== Background and development ==
Vishnu Vijay renewed his association with Girish after Premalu (2024) for Bethlehem Kudumba Unit. While working on the score, Vishnu focused on creating a soundscape that emotionally resonated with the audience, particularly the interval sequence. He noted that particular sequence being powerful enough without music due to the performances and dialogue of the lead characters but Vishnu emphasized on creating a score to build anticipation in the later half of the film. Vishnu deliberately avoided clichéd musical patterns, and proceeded with the sounds that felt distinct but connected to the overall flow of the narrative that complimented the ending as well.

For the song "Manthrikam", Vishnu roped veteran singer M. G. Sreekumar to record the vocals which felt a nostalgic music that accompanied the setting. The song was the first to be written for the film. Lyricist Vinayak Sasikumar denoted that the song was written with the idea of presenting the concept of magic and that has been used to describe the emotional changes experienced by Justin, especially the feeling of first love or the excitement of something new, where Ashley's arrival brings about several changes in his life. He initially wrote the song beginning with "Mayikam" but later changed to "Manthrikam".

The song "Indrajaalam" and "Varnajalam" were created by referencing the Padmarajan-directed film Season (1989) and the narration style served as a core. "Varnajaalam" and "Indrajaalam" also continued the theme of magic, as Vishnu insisted Sasikumar to maintain the magic as the connecting concept for the songs. "Varnajaalam" when then depicted the journey of the title characters. Lyricist Suhail Koya provided another version of the climax song, which Sasikumar continued it and wrote the song "Indrajaalam". "Muttayi Vandi" also followed the same concept of magic through a different lyrical approach, where the song utilizes simpler expressions and a perspective distinct from Justin. Sasikumar denoted that the song focuses from Ashley's perspective or a third person's perspective of someone watching from the outside.

While creating "Cha Cha Chi Chi Choo", Vishnu wanted the song to be natural part of the scene, with the lyrics being sounded like a natural conversation, accompanying dialogue-based lyrical and the underlying instrument featured an harmonium as Vishnu imagined an old musician with the instrument that provided the unique, grounded mood of the composition.

== Release ==
The song "Manthrikam" was released as the first single on 24 July 2026. The second single "Illey Illa" was released on 10 August. The soundtrack was released on 26 August, coinciding Onam.

== Reception ==
Sreeju Sudhakaran of Rediff.com described it as a "catchy score" and the songs are "certainly pleasant". Anandu Suresh of The Indian Express wrote "Composer Vishnu Vijay has delivered yet another solid soundtrack after Premalu, and the background music is nothing short of stunning." Gopika Is of The Times of India wrote "Vishnu Vijay's music brings all the right cosy feelings." S. R. Praveen of The Hindu wrote "Vishnu Vijay's music gets the feel of the movie." Santanu Das of Hindustan Times wrote "Most of all, it is Vishnu Vijay's radiant music that gives the film its soul."

Janani K of India Today wrote "Vishnu Vijay delivers one of the film's strongest technical assets, mixing lilting melodies with nostalgic tracks that complement its warmth." Swathi P Ajith of OnManorama wrote "Vishnu Vijay's music brings his familiar touch to the film. Premalu had a soundtrack that became an integral part of its appeal, and while the music here does not quite carry the same weight, Vishnu Vijay's presence is felt throughout."

== Track listing ==
Malayalam
No.	Title	Lyrics	Singer(s)	Length
1.	"Maanthrikam"	Vinayak Sasikumar	M. G. Sreekumar	3:16
2.	"Illey Illa"	Suhail Koya	Kapil Kapilan	3:30
3.	"Varnajaalam"	Vinayak Sasikumar	K. S. Harisankar, Poornima Kannan	3:22
4.	"Muttayi Vandi"	Vinayak Sasikumar	Sid Sriram	4:00
5.	"Kanmaniye"	Suhail Koya	Vishnu Vijay	3:12
6.	"Piditharaa"	Suhail Koya	Aparna Harikumar, Vishnu Vijay	2:30
7.	"Cha Cha Chi Chi Choo"	Suhail Koya	Vagu Mazan, Vishnu Vijay	3:45
8.	"Rakthasahodaran"	Suhail Koya	Suhail Koya	1:00
9.	"Kochu Thanuppu"	Suhail Koya	Vishnu Vijay	2:36
10.	"Indrajaalam"	Suhail Koya	Aparna Harikumar, K. S. Harisankar, Vishnu Vijay	3:18
Total length:				30:29

Tamil
No.	Title	Lyrics	Singer(s)	Length
1.	"Yaaridho"	Madrashe	Sarath Santhosh	3:19
2.	"Ille Illa"	Vishnu Edavan	Kapil Kapilan	3:34
3.	"Varnajaalam"	Vishnu Edavan	K. S. Harisankar, Poornima Kannan	3:25
4.	"Muttayi Vandi"	Vishnu Edavan	Kapil Kapilan	4:02
5.	"Kanmaniye"	Madrashe	Sarath Santhosh	3:15
6.	"Cha Cha Chi Chi Choo"	Suhail Koya	Vagu Mazan, Vishnu Vijay	3:45
7.	"Hide and Seek"	Suhail Koya	Suhail Koya	1:03
8.	"Oru Chinna Panithuli"	Madrashe	Kapil Kapilan	2:42
9.	"Mayapoove"	Madrashe	Aparna Harikumar, K. S. Harisankar, Vishnu Vijay	3:21
Total length:				28:29

Telugu
No.	Title	Lyrics	Singer(s)	Length
1.	"Adbhutham"	Gossain	Sarath Santhosh	3:19
2.	"No No"	Gossain	Kapil Kapilan	3:34
3.	"Maayajaalam"	Gossain	K. S. Harisankar, Poornima Kannan	3:25
4.	"Mithai Bandi"	Gossain	Kapil Kapilan	4:02
5.	"Priyathama"	Gossain	Sarath Santhosh	3:15
6.	"Cha Cha Chi Chi Choo"	Suhail Koya	Vagu Mazan, Vishnu Vijay	3:45
7.	"Hide and Seek"	Suhail Koya	Suhail Koya	1:03
8.	"Oka Manchu Renuve"	Gossain	Kapil Kapilan	2:42
9.	"Indrajaalam"	Gossain	Aparna Harikumar, K. S. Harisankar, Vishnu Vijay	3:21
Total length:				28:29

== Personnel ==
Credits adapted from Bhavana Studios:

- Music composer, arranger and producer: Vishnu Vijay
- Additional music producer: Anoop R Nair, Paul Renold
- Project manager: Poornima Kannan
- Music production manager: Christy Thomas Cherian
- Studio sessions managers: Paul Renold, Vignesh Raj
- Artist session manager: K D Vincent, Don Vincent
- Mixing and mastering: Sujith Sreedhar (The Masterhouse, 2BarQ Studios, Chennai)
- Mixing assistance: Amal Mithu, Manu Prasad
- Recording engineers: Amal Raj, Ajay Surya, Amal Mithu, Hariharan, Christy Thomas Cherian
- Recording studios: MLounge Studios, Kochi; 2BarQ Studios, Chennai; 20dB Sound Studios, Chennai; Dravida Studios, Chennai

Featured musicians

- Flute: Vishnu Vijay
- Acoustic, electric and bass guitars: Keba Jeremiah
- Trumpet: Viji
- Additional rhythm programming: Kalyan Chakravarthy
- Rhythm edit: Christy Thomas Cherian
- Kids chorus: Medha Ganesh, Acadia Aneesh, Nila Raj, Chinmayi Kiranlal, Vasudev
- Chorus supervisor: Nikhil Mathew, Unni Elayaraja
