= Inbavalli =

- Theatrical release poster
- Directed by: S. Nottani
- Story by: Elangovan; Srinivasan; P. A. Kumar
- Starring: T. R. Mahalingam; B. S. Saroja
- Cinematography: V. B. Jagtab
- Edited by: S. Nottani
- Music by: G. Ramanathan
- Production company: Shyamala Pictures
- Distributed by: Super Pictures
- Release date: 16 September 1949
- Running time: 15,465 ft.
- Country: India
- Language: Tamil

Inbavalli is a 1949 Indian Tamil-language film directed by S. Nottani, starring T. R. Mahalingam and B. S. Saroja.

== Plot ==
It is a love story between a princess and the minister's son. Both of them grew up together and eventually fall in love with each other. However, the reigning queen has an idea of marrying her daughter to a prince. Learning this, the lovers elope together during a night. A massive hunt for them begins. There is a wily magician who is also interested in the princess. He finds the minister's son and captures him by his tricks. But an old lady saves the minister's son. She transforms him into a parrot. The parrot flies away and escapes. The palace dancer take refuge of the parrot. After many twists and turns finally the lovers are united.

== Cast ==
Male cast

- T. R. Mahalingam as Minister's son
- N. S. Krishnan
- M. R. Swaminathan as Wizard
- E. R. Sahadevan
- P. Sundara Rao
- T. V. Sethuraman
- Baboon Shankara Iyer
- M. Lakshmanan
- C. V. Velappa
- A. V. Ramkumar
- K. S. Harihara Iyer
- Radhakrishnan

Female cast

- B. S. Saroja as Princess
- T. A. Madhuram
- P. K. Saraswathi as Palace Dancer
- S. Menaka
- M. D. Krishna Bai as Queen
- K. S. Angamuthu
- M. Saroja
- K. Jayalakshmi
- Sethulakshmi
- Bhagyalakshmi

== Production ==
The film was produced by Shyamala Pictures and shot at Ratna Studios, Salem. The film is a folklore-genre tale with incredible twists. May be inspired by the classic The Arabian Nights, this film has scenes where humans are transformed into animals like bears and monkeys and also shows a kind of mirror in which one can see the past and the future. Cinematography was handled by V. B. Jagtab.

== Soundtrack ==
Music was composed by G. Ramanathan and lyrics were penned by Rajagopala Iyer and K. P. Kamatchi.

No.	Song	Singer	Lyrics	Duration
1	"Anbe Perum Nidhiye"	T. R. Mahalingam & P. A. Periyanayaki		02:47
2	"Dheiva Sothanai Thaano"	P. A. Periyanayaki		03:33
3	"Thanguda Dingale"	N. S. Krishnan & T. A. Madhuram; Poikaal Kudhirai Aattam		04:42
4	"Jagadamba"	P. A. Periyanayaki & P. Leela		03:35 (02:43 – 06:18)
5	"Eno Innum Vara Kaanen"	T. R. Mahalingam		03:44
6	"Maalai Sooda Avar Vanthaaradi"	P. Leela		02:48
7	"O Aiyaa Maare Vaarunga"			02:14
8	"Nee Thunai Purivaaiye"	P. Leela		02:37
9	"Aaruyire Enathaasai Anbe Vaa"	P. Leela		02:24
10	"Innum Vara Kaanene"	P. A. Periyanayaki		03:11
11	"Inbamana Mohini Maane"	T. R. Mahalingam & P. Leela		03:20
12	"Sambalame Elumichambazhame"	N. S. Krishnan & T. A. Madhuram		
13	"Naadha En Aasai"	T. R. Mahalingam & T. V. Rathnam		02:13
14	"Yaar Umai Polae"	P. A. Periyanayaki		04:27
15	"Mandhirathin Perai Solli"	N. S. Krishnan & T. A. Madhuram		01:35
