= S. Nottani =

Indian filmmaker

- Born: Shewakram Nottani; Bombay
- Died: 1949
- Occupations: Filmmaker, Businessman
- Years active: 1938–1949

S. Nottani was an Indian filmmaker. He created the first Malayalam talkie Balan (film) in 1938. He also directed a Malayalam movie, Gnanambika in (1940). His most contributions were mainly focused in the Tamil film industry. He directed Santhanadevan (1937), Satyavaani (1940), Bhaktha Gowri(1941), Sivalinga Satchi (1942) and Inbavalli(1949).

== Filmography ==
=== Malayalam ===
- Balan (1938) (first Malayalam talkie)
- Gnanambika (1940)

=== Tamil ===
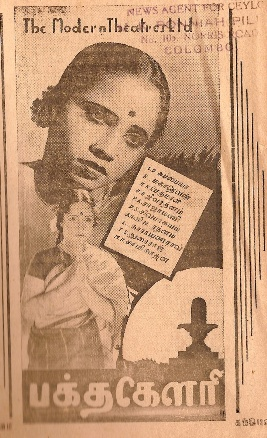
Film Poster of Baktha Gowri

- Santhanadevan (1937)
- Satyavaani (1940)
- Bhaktha Gowri (1941)
- Sivalinga Satchi (1942)
- Inbavalli (1949)
