= Minnalppadayaali =

- Directed by: G. Viswanath
- Screenplay by: Muthukulam Raghavan Pilla
- Produced by: Thiruppathi Chettiyar
- Starring: Sathyan; Padmini
- Edited by: G. Viswanath
- Music by: P. S. Divakar; Ranganathan
- Production company: Evershine
- Release date: 10 September 1959
- Country: India
- Language: Malayalam

Minnalppadayaali is a 1959 Indian Malayalam-language film, directed by G. Viswanath and produced by Thiruppathi Chettiyar. The film stars Satyan and Miss Kumari. The film had musical score by P. S. Divakar and Ranganathan.

== Cast ==
- Sebastian Kunjukunju Bhagavathar
- Sathyan
- Kottayam Chellappan
- Vijayam
- Padmini Priyadarsini

Thiruvananthapuram Lalitha
