= Athiradi (2026 film) =

2026 Indian film by Arun Anirudhan

- Theatrical release poster
- Directed by: Arun Anirudhan
- Written by: Arun Anirudhan; Paulson Skaria
- Produced by: Basil Joseph; Ananthu S.
- Starring: Tovino Thomas; Basil Joseph; Vineeth Sreenivasan; Riya Shibu; Zarin Shihab
- Cinematography: Samuel Henry
- Edited by: Chaman Chakko
- Music by: Vishnu Vijay
- Production companies: Basil Joseph Entertainment; Dr. Ananthu Entertainments
- Release date: 14 May 2026
- Running time: 157 minutes
- Country: India
- Language: Malayalam
- Budget: ₹30 crore
- Box office: est. ₹71 crore

Athiradi (trans. Strike) is a 2026 Indian Malayalam-language action comedy film written and directed by Arun Anirudhan (in his directorial debut) and produced by Basil Joseph and Ananthu S. The film features Tovino Thomas, Basil Joseph, Vineeth Sreenivasan, Riya Shibu and Zarin Shihab.

== Plot ==
Few years back, BCET College's renowned fest Aarohan is under way. Two BCET students Joseph Oommen and Merin, who are incidentally lovers, are the main coordinators of the fest. The fest ends up in a tragedy after Merin and 2 other students got killed in a stampede. The tragedy was caused when Joseph opened the gates to let in a huge crowd of junior students who ran into the event hall excitedly, causing a stampede wherein 3 students including Merin die. The incident made Joseph get depressed and he left the college. Aarohan Fest also gets banned by the college, and the event hall where the stampede happened, is sealed shut forever.

Years later, Samkutty aka 'Sam Boy', the younger brother of Joseph joins BCET college. As a part of impressing his crush Swathi R. Krishna, he decides to revive the event in order to seem capable enough for Swathi. Reviving the fest also has an emotional significance for Samkutty, as he doesn't want to hear each batch of the college blaming his beloved brother Joseph for having the fest banned. Sam tries various means to get the college authorities to permit restarting of the fest. After multiple failed attempts, it was already Sam’s last year at college. While everyone else moved on, Sam kept trying to get the event approved. Finally, he pulls an emotional move and writes letters to the parents of the 3 students who dies in the stampede and convinces them to speak to the college authorities to allow restarting of the fest. Finally, college authorities agree to restart the fest. But the college authorities, not aware of Sam's background work to get approval for the fest, appoints Swathi as the main convenor of the fest. And Vivi, their classmate, tries to steal the credit claiming he was the one who put efforts to revive the fest. But Sam's bestfriend Parashu stands up for Sam and narrates all the pains Sam went through to revive the fest. Swathi also seconds him, and Sam is given an important post in the fest's coordination. Sam gets emotional but tries to pretend before Swathi that he didn't cry. But Swathi says she thinks men who can cry are hot. Sam is elated to realise that Swathi might possibly have feelings for him.

The fest begins and Sam has multiple events ready for action, including a major car stunt show. During the car stunt as a part of the fest, the students blocked the path of local temple circumambulation, leading to a chaos during which, Sreekuttan Vellayani, a retired goon and an aspiring singer and music troupe owner, who was spearheading the local temple festival, is humiliated by the students who beat him due to a misunderstanding. In the chaos that ensues, Sreekuttan's beloved wife Varada's feet is also injured. Humiliated and enraged, Sreekuttan vouches revenge against the college fest. He walks into the college, creates a ruckus, and forcibly removes the head of the fest's mascot robot. When Samkutty confronts him, Sreekuttan challenges Samkutty that his proshow where Vineeth Sreenivasan is going to sing, won't happen! That afternoon, to Sam's horror, Sreekuttan and gang kidnaps Vineeth Sreenivasan along with Shaan Rahman, who accompanied him, from the airport.

Sreekuttan and his gang keep Vineeth and Shaan locked and threatens them to perform at his temple festival instead of the college proshow. Samkutty, fearing loss of credibility from college, initially hides the fact of Vineeth's kidnapping from the students including Swathi, but Sreekuttan participates in college car show and publicly in mic welcomes the students to the Vineeth Sreenivasan concert in his local temple, thus exposing the truth to all. Samkutty is called a liar, and persons like Vivi accuse him of not having booked Vineeth at all. Initially heartbroken and feeling like a loser, Samkutty listens to a voice clip of his brother recorded at the time of a past successful Aarohan Fest, and is inspired to do his best to save the day. Swathi, Parashu, and others close to him, comes together in his support.

Samkutty manages to find the hideout of Sreekuttan and with an elaborate planning and the help of his friends, rescues Vineeth and Shaan and succeeds in bringing them on to the stage. An enraged Sreekuttan follows and is about to throw a deadly firecracker onto the stage but is caught midtrack when Vineeth sings the song "Ammaputhappe" composed by Sreekuttan in memory of his mother. Sreekuttan had been intending to have that song debut on stage that day, and Sreekuttan is deeply moved when Vineeth sings it beautifully on stage. Sreekuttan is escorted off the event by the police in a comic sequence, while Vineeth goes on to sing more songs. The event is a huge success, and in a significant moment, Joseph and his classmates are invited on stage to release a college magazine edited by Merin, the release of which couldn't happen that day due to the tragic stampede. Samkutty is celebrated in the event after successfully conducting the event and the college rejoicing in the event.

As the film ends, Kuttan is shown to be running a music troupe which he is advertising to be having Vineeth Sreenivasan's blessings. Kuttan calls Vineeth for blessings. Vineeth fearfully gives him blessings. Kuttan then sings his Ammapputhappe composition in another temple festival.

== Cast ==
- Tovino Thomas as Sreekuttan "Kuttan" Vellayani / "Thotta Kuttan"
- Basil Joseph as Samkutty "Sam Boy" Oommen
- Vineeth Sreenivasan as himself
- Riya Shibu as Swathy R. Krishna, Samkutty’s love interest
- Zarin Shihab as Varada, Kuttan's wife
- Shaan Rahman as himself
- Vishnu Agasthya as Joseph "Joppan" Oommen, Samkutty's elder brother
- P. Sukumar as Oommen "Chachan", Samkutty's and Joseph's father
- Shelvin James as Prashanth "Parashu", Samkutty's friend
- Arsha Jayaram as RJ Elizabeth
- Shersha Sherief as Vivi "Alpha Male"
- Tiss Thomas as Bosco, Samkutty's friend and his junior
- Jeo Baby as SI Manichan
- Vineeth Thattil David as Fr. Paul Markose, Bursar of BCET College
- Reena Indrayani as Vivi's mother
- Niyas Backer as Sabu, Samkutty's uncle
- Shivam Gupta as Ozin, Samkutty's friend
- Hariharan as Charlie, Samkutty's friend
- Suryanarayanan as Anto, Samkutty's friend
- Yadhukrishnan as Marley, Samkutty's friend
- Aaryan
- Sarath Vedi
- Sonu Surendran
- Ganga Meera as Dr. Lovely Mathew, Principal of BCET College
- Rini .K. Rajan
- Nirupama Thomas as Anagha
- Divya AB as Tanvi
- Abin John
- Rajkumar R
- Aravind SK as Shambhu, Joppan's colleague
- Aromal Devaraj
- Athul Singh as Vivi's friend
- Kannan Nayar as CPO Saji
- Santhivila Dinesh as Sanal Kumar
- Mahesh Kunjumon as Varkala Sudheesh
- Annmiya Antony as Kuttan's daughter
- Sivadas Kannur as Jayaraj, Professor of BCET College
- Nithin Parameswar
- Kiran Peethambaran as Merin's father
- Aswathy Chandra Kishor
- Manoj Guinness as Master Agnivesh's father

=== Cameo Appearances ===
- Benjamin P. Joby as Master Agnivesh
- Darshana Rajendran as Merin, Joppan's love interest, who died in the college stampede which led to the banning of Arohan fest .
- Devan as himself
- Hashir H as Dennichan, the owner of the BMW .
- Annam Johnpaul as Kuttan's mother in this song "Ammaputhappe"
- Sangeeth Prathap as Student (voiceover)

== Music ==
Athiradi

Soundtrack album by Vishnu Vijay
- Released: 14 May 2026
- Genre: Feature film soundtrack
- Length: 4:55
- Language: Malayalam
- Label: Saregama

Vishnu Vijay chronology
Lovely (2025)	Athiradi (2026)	Bethlehem Kudumba Unit (2026)

The music and background scores of the movie were composed by Vishnu Vijay. The first single of the movie, "IFYKYK", was released on 28 April 2026. The second single, "Patti Show" was released on 4 May 2026.

Track listing
No.	Title	Lyrics	Singer(s)	Length
1.	"IYKYK"	Suhail Koya	Fejo, Poornima Kannan	2:23
2.	"Patti Show"	Suhail Koya, Arivu	Dabzee, Arivu, Suhail Koya	2:32
3.	"Mic Check"	Suhail Koya	Suhail Koya	2:03
4.	"Ammaputhappe"	Suhail Koya	Vineeth Sreenivasan, Vishnu Vijay	4:20
Total length:				11:18

== Release ==
=== Theatrical Release ===
The film had a paid premiere on 13 May, a day before its release. The film was released on theatres on 14 May 2026. The film received a clean U certificate from the CBFC

=== Home Media ===
The post-theatrical streaming rights were acquired by SonyLIV. The film premiered via SonyLIV on 19 June 2026.

== Reception ==
The movie received mixed to positive responses from the critics. Anjana George of The Times of India gave 4 on 5 rating for the movie and wrote that, despite its familiar setup, Athiradi turns out to be one of the most enjoyable entertainers in recent time - a colourful, laughter filled celebration of youth, friendship dreams and second chances. Maruti Acharya of India Today rates 3.5 on 5 for the movie and wrote that, Athiradi is messy in parts and stretched in others, but it never feels dishonest. The friendships work, the humour lands more often than not, and the emotional core involving the brothers gives the film its heart.

Nainu Oommen of The Hindu opined that, the movie is a fun watch, which does not take itself too seriously. The film that recreates the vibes of a loud, energetic college fete, consistently makes you laugh, if you catch the references. Vignesh Madhu of The New Indian Express wrote that Athiradi is one of those films that does not warrant a lot of digging, but just vibing along. Anandu Suresh of The Indian Express gave 2 on 5-star rating for the movie and wrote that, this action comedy is weighed down by a hollow narrative, forced Gen-Z stereotypes, a meme-heavy script, and contrast between its ambitious setup and lack of emotional depth.

The film became a hit in the box office collecting 71 Crore INR worldwide.
