= Chemmeen =

- Poster
- Directed by: Ramu Kariat
- Screenplay by: S. L. Puram Sadanandan
- Based on: Chemmeen by Thakazhi Sivasankara Pillai
- Produced by: Babu Ismail Sait (Kanmani Babu)
- Starring: Sathyan; Sheela; Madhu; Kottarakkara Sreedharan Nair
- Cinematography: Marcus Bartley; U. Rajagopal
- Edited by: Hrishikesh Mukherjee; K. D. George
- Music by: Salil Chowdhury
- Production company: Kanmani Films
- Release date: 19 August 1966
- Country: India
- Language: Malayalam
- Budget: ₹8 lakhs
- Box office: ₹40 lakhs

Chemmeen (transl. The Prawn) is a 1966 Indian Malayalam-language romance film, based on the novel of the same name by Thakazhi Sivasankara Pillai. It was adapted into a screenplay by S. L. Puram Sadanandan, directed by Ramu Kariat, and produced by Babu Ismail Sait under the banner Kanmani Films. The film stars Sheela as Karuthamma, Sathyan as Palani, Kottarakkara Sreedharan Nair as Chembankunju, and Madhu as Pareekutty. The film tells the story of a pre-marital and later extra-marital relationship between Karuthamma, the daughter of an ambitious fisherman, and Pareekutty, the son of an affluent trader.

The theme of the film is a popular legend among the fishermen communities along the coastal Kerala State in southern India regarding chastity. The legend says that if a married fisherwoman is unfaithful when her husband is out at sea, the Sea Goddess (Kadalamma literally meaning the Mother Sea) would consume him. It has cinematography by Marcus Bartley and U. Rajagopal, and editing by Hrishikesh Mukherjee and K. D. George. The original score and songs were composed by Salil Chowdhury, with lyrics by Vayalar, and songs featuring the voices of K. J. Yesudas, P. Leela, Manna Dey and Santha P. Nair.

The film was censored in late 1965 and released on 19 August 1966. It received strongly positive critical reviews and was recognised as a technically and artistically brilliant film. This movie was a blockbuster and broke many records. It is usually cited as the first notable creative film in South India and is one of the popular cult classics in Malayalam cinema. It was also the first South Indian film to win the Indian President's Gold Medal for the Best Feature Film, in 1965. It was screened at various international film festivals and won awards at the Cannes and Chicago festivals. The film was included in the list of 100 greatest Indian films by IBN Live. Chemmeen was dubbed and released in Hindi as Chemmeen Lahren and in English as The Anger of the Sea. A sequel, Thirakalkkappuram, was released in 1998.

== Plot ==
Karuthamma is the daughter of Chembankunju, an ambitious fisherman. She is in love with a young fish trader, Pareekutty. Chembankunju's only aim in life is to own a boat and net. Pareekutty finances Chembankunju to realise this dream. This is on the condition that the haul by the boat will be sold only to him. Karuthamma's mother Chakki learns of her daughter's affair with Pareekutty, and reminds her daughter about the life they lead within the boundaries of strict social tradition and warns her to keep away from such a relationship. The fisherfolk believe that a fisherwoman has to lead a life within the boundaries of strict social traditions.

Karuthamma sacrifices her love for Pareekutty and marries Palani, an orphan discovered by Chembankunju in the course of one of his fishing expeditions. Following the marriage, Karuthamma accompanies her husband to his village, despite her mother's sudden illness and her father's requests to stay. In his fury, Chembankunju disowns her. On acquiring a boat and a net and subsequently adding one more, Chembankunju becomes more greedy and heartless. With his dishonesty, he drives Pareekutty to bankruptcy. After the death of his wife, Chembankunju marries Pappikunju, the widow of the man from whom he had bought his first boat. Panchami, Chembankunju's younger daughter, hates her stepmother and her son and constantly taunts them. Pappikunju's son, unable to bear the constant humiliation by Panchami, decides to leave in search of a better life. Emotionally blackmailed by her son, Pappikunju steals money from Chembankunju's savings and gives it to her son. Panchami finds this out and informs Chembankunju. He ousts Pappikunju from their home, and turns mad due to the setbacks faced in his life. Alarmed by her father's madness, Panchami leaves home to join Karuthamma.

Meanwhile, Karuthamma has endeavoured to be a good wife and mother, but scandal about her old love for Pareekutty spreads in the village. Palani's friends ostracise him and refuse to take him fishing with them. Supported by Karuthamma, Palani starts to go fishing in a single-man boat. They slowly prosper and become parents to a daughter. Palani initially trusts his wife, but due to the constant vile talk by the villagers, seeds of doubt start to get sown in his mind. One day, when he hears Karuthamma enquiring about Pareekutty to Panchami, he confronts her, and accuses Karuthamma of cheating and leaves in the night to go on his fishing expedition. By a stroke of fate, Karuthamma and Pareekutty meet that night and their old love is awakened. Palani, at sea alone and baiting a shark, is caught in a huge whirlpool and is swallowed by the sea. Next morning, Karuthamma and Pareekutty, are also found dead hand in hand, washed ashore. At a distance, there lies the body of the shark which was baited by Palani.

== Cast ==
- Sheela as Karuthamma
- Madhu as Pareekutty
- Sathyan as Palani
- Kottarakkara Sreedharan Nair as Chembankunju
- Adoor Bhavani as Chakki
- Latha Raju as Panchami
- Adoor Pankajam as Nalla Pennu
- S. P. Pillai as Achankunju
- Rajakumari Venu as Pappikkunju
- Philomina
- Paravoor Bharathan
- Nilambur Ayisha
- Jerrardh Josekutty as Shark

== Production ==
=== Development ===
Kariat bought the rights from Thakazhi for ₹8000, a comparatively large sum for a Malayalam novel then. With adapting the novel, Ramu Kariat was taking a big risk as everybody in the film circle was almost certain that the film would be no patch on the novel. The project was bankrolled by Babu Ismail Sait under the banner Kanmani Films. Once Ramu Kariat had decided to make a film based on the novel, he approached several people including the Kerala State Government for funds to produce the film. On one of these journeys, he met Babu Ismail Sait (Kanmani Babu). Then in his early twenties, Kanmani Babu agreed to finance the film.

=== Filming ===
Although the novel was set in the coastal area of Alappuzha, The film was shot from Nattika beach in Thrissur and Varkala Beach in Thiruvananthapuram. Ramu Kariat wanted to shoot the film in the exact locations mentioned in Thakazhi's novel. But some people at Purakkad demanded rent for their boats, forcing Kariat to shift the location to Nattika, a place he was familiar with. In the 40th anniversary of the release of the film, Madhu described how the fisherfolk of Nattika cooperated by offering their homes and clothing for the filming. He also described how Sathyan escaped being drowned in the sea during the shooting. After the outdoor shoot was done cinematographer Marcus Bartley had to leave as he had to complete a Dilip Kumar film and U. Rajagopal gave the finishing touches to the film.

== Soundtrack ==
Chemmeen

Soundtrack album by Salil Chowdhury
- Released: 1965
- Recorded: Bharani Studio Recording Theatre, Madras
- Genre: World Music
- Label: His Master's Voice
- Producer: Babu Ismail Sait

Salil Chowdhury chronology
Chand Aur Suraj (1965)	Chemmeen (1965)	'Ezhuraathrikal' (1968)

The music was composed by Salil Chowdhary and the lyrics were written by Vayalar Ramavarma. Chemmeen marked Salil Chowdhary's debut in South Indian music.

No.	Song	Singers	Lyrics	Length (m:ss)
1	"Kadalinakkare Ponore"	K. J. Yesudas	Vayalar Ramavarma	3:48
2	"Maanasamaine Varoo"	Manna Dey	Vayalar Ramavarma	3:12
3	"Pennaale Pennaale"	K. J. Yesudas, P. Leela, Chorus	Vayalar Ramavarma	5:39
4	"Puthan Valakkare"	K. J. Yesudas, P. Leela, Chorus, K. P. Udayabhanu, Shantha P. Nair	Vayalar Ramavarma	3:19
5	Theme Music	Instrumental		2:20

== Awards ==
- National Film Award for Best Feature Film
- Filmfare Award for Best Film - Malayalam won by Hasam Ismail (1966)
- Certificate of Merit at the Chicago International Film Festival
- Gold Medal at the Cannes Film Festival for Best Cinematography – Marcus Bartley

== Controversy ==
In 2017, the fishermen community boycotted the Golden jubilee celebrations of the film, conducted by the State government. The Akhila Kerala Deevara Sabha, an association of fisherfolk, alleged that the movie is the origin for all the insults that the community has faced over the years. Dheevara Sabha general secretary and ex-MLA V. Dinakaran told The News Minute that Malayalam cinema and serials for the last many decades have intentionally portrayed fisherfolk as "uncultured". Further stating “I was in college when I watched Chemmeen. I was shocked to see how the movie projected false stories of our community.”

== Legacy ==
Chemmeen is a landmark in Indian cinema not just for its immersive storytelling, but additionally because it is a truly all-India project, its credits serving as a roll call of cross-country icons: cinematographer Marcus Bartley, Hrishikesh Mukherjee as editor, and music by Salil Chowdhury making his Malayalam debut here with a soundtrack featuring singers K. J. Yesudas, P. Leela and several other artistes, including, for one song, Manna Dey.

— Anna M. M. Vetticad, Firstpost.

Chemeen is regarded as a classic in Indian cinema and has achieved cult status in Malayalam cinema; one of Kariat's most celebrated films, regarded by critics as a masterpiece of Malayalam cinema, credited with simultaneously helping to popularize South Indian cinema in the North and influencing later South Indian films. It became the first South Indian film to win President's Gold Medal for the Best Film. The film also became the first Indian film to win the Certificate of Merit at the Chicago International Film Festival and the Gold Medal at the Cannes Film Festival. The Kerala State government conducted the golden jubilee celebrations of Chemmeen on 8 April 2017 in Alappuzha. CM Pinarayi Vijayan had inaugurated the event.

In March 2019, C. S. Venkiteswaran of The Hindu wrote, "Omnipotent and omnipresent like the sea is the presence of the milieu; never before has the life of fisherfolk in all its beauty and misery been portrayed more vividly in Malayalam cinema. Even when they bicker and fight, they readily share all the sorrows and celebrations of life." He further writes, "Chemmeen worked with the most elemental in individual and society, communal and personal life, human emotions and yearnings, which may be the reason why it still holds its mercurial charm." In September 2020, Anna M. M. Vetticad of Firstpost wrote, "Ramu Kariat's Chemmeen gave me my maiden memory of being mesmerized by the visual aspect of the audiovisual media. In February 2022, Piyush Roy of The Hindu called Chemmen "A highpoint of Malayalam cinema" and called it "a fine artistic work of human passion." and praised its soundtrack in particular, which Roy felt was the highpoint of the film. He writes, "The high point of Chemmeen, however, is its music that brings together a talented pool of music-makers from north and south. Bollywood music director Salil Chowdhury weaves a timeless score, as he captures the unique sounds of the kaleidoscopic setting."

In 2013, in an online poll conducted by CNN-IBN on their website as part of the 100 years celebration of Indian cinema, Chemmeen came 23rd in the poll for finding the "greatest Indian film ever". In 2017, Kamal Haasan included the film in his list of 70 favorite movies, stating "Chemeen ceased to be a Malayalam film, it became the pride of south India, a national film. It's a grown-up love story. The music by Salil Chowdhury, the editing by Hrishikesh Mukherjee, the direction by Ramu Kariat...today it looks like a simple film. But it's stunning." In 2005, Mohanlal listed Chemeen in his list of top ten best Indian films of all time, stating "Chemmeen is a classic. Even today, its charm has not diminished." In 2016, on the occasion of India celebrating its 70th Independence day, news agency NDTV compiled a list called "70 Years, 70 Great Films" and Chemmen was among the four Malayalam films that found place in the list.

== Bibliography ==
- Gupta, CD (1980). "New Directions in Indian Cinema". Film Quarterly. 34 (1): 32–42. doi:10.1525/fq.1980.34.1.04a00070. JSTOR 1211852.
- B. Vijayakumar (22 November 2010). "Chemmeen 1965". The Hindu. Chennai, India. Archived from the original on 9 November 2012.
- "Celebrating 40 years of a movie classic". The Hindu. Chennai, India. 13 October 2005. Archived from the original on 3 November 2005.
