= Weekend Blockbusters =

Indian film studio

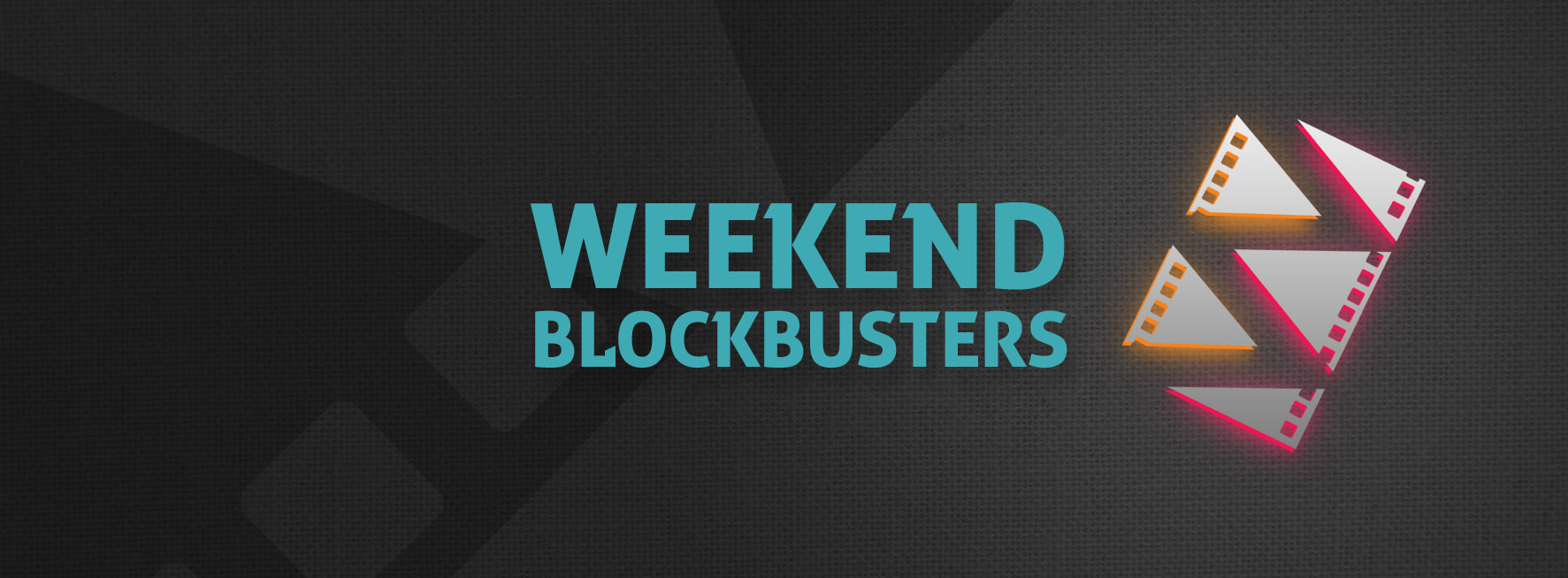
- Type: Private
- Industry: Malayalam Film Industry
- Founded: 2014
- Headquarters: Kollam, Kerala, India
- Key people: Sophia Paul; James Paul
- Products: Film production Film distribution

Weekend Blockbusters is an Indian film production company based in Kollam, Kerala, India. It was established in 2014 by producer Sophia Paul. Its first production was the Malayalam film Bangalore Days (2014). In 2016, they produced two films - Kaadu Pookkunna Neram and Munthirivallikal Thalirkkumbol.

== History ==
Weekend Blockbusters debuted in film production in 2014 in Malayalam film industry by producing Bangalore Days, directed by Anjali Menon. The film jointly produced by Weekend Blockbusters and Anwar Rasheed Entertainments was a critical and commercial success. It collected an estimated sum close to ₹50 crore at the box office, and became one of the highest-grossing Malayalam films of all time. Their second production was Dr. Biju directed Kaadu Pookkunna Neram (2016) starring Indrajith Sukumaran.

The next film was the domestic drama Munthirivallikal Thalirkkumbol, Mohanlal starring film directed by Jibu Jacob. The film started production on 15 July 2016 in Kozhikode, Kerala. It was released in February 2017 and was a major commercial success with total gross over ₹50 crore worldwide. It was followed by the comedy road film Padayottam starring Biju Menon.

== Films ==
| Year | Title | Director | Notes |
|---|---|---|---|
| 2014 | Bangalore Days | Anjali Menon | Co-produced with Anwar Rasheed Entertainments |
| 2016 | Kaadu Pookkunna Neram | Dr. Biju | Premiered at the Montreal World Film Festival |
| 2017 | Munthirivallikal Thalirkkumbol | Jibu Jacob | |
| 2018 | Padayottam | Rafeek Ibrahim | |
| 2021 | Minnal Murali | Basil Joseph | Released on Netflix |
| 2023 | RDX | Nahas Hidhayath | |
| 2024 | Kondal | Ajith Mampally | |
| 2025 | Detective Ujjwalan | Indraneel Gopalakrishnan; Rahul G | |
| 2026 | Cosmic Samson † | Abhijith Joseph | |
| TBA | Jambi † | George Kora | |

== Weekend Cinematic Universe ==
Weekend Blockbusters launched their own shared universe of films, called Weekend Cinematic Universe (WCU). The first film in this universe was Minnal Murali (2021), a Malayalam-language superhero film directed by Basil Joseph and starring Tovino Thomas as the titular character. The film received critical acclaim and gained international attention following its release on Netflix.

The second film in the universe, Detective Ujjwalan (2025), directed by Indraneel Gopeekrishnan and Rahul G featuring Dhyan Sreenivasan in titular role with Siju Wilson and Rony David Raj playing lead roles.

The third film in the universe is Jambi, a zombie thriller film directed by George Kora that will release in 2026.
