= Chowara =

Village in Ernakulam District, Kerala, India

Coordinates: 23.4131°N 91.2222°E

Chowara is a village in Ernakulam District, Kerala, situated about 5 km North of Aluva Town

== Agriculture ==
Rice is grown and harvested in Chowwera.

== See also ==
- Sreemoolanagaram
