= K. K. Aroor =

Indian actor, singer and music composer

- Born: K. Kunju Nair; 1889; Aroor, Alappuzha district
- Died: 1984 (aged 94–95); Pallai, Sri Lanka
- Occupation: Actor
- Years active: 1938–1964

K. Kunju Nair (1889 – 1984) was an Indian actor, singer and music composer in Malayalam cinema. He was the main character in Balan, the first Malayalam sound film in history.

== Biography ==
After Balan, Aroor changed his name to K. K. Aroor. There were 23 songs in Balan, all of which were composed by Ibrahim and K.K.Aroor and written by Muthukulam Raghavan Pillai. He subsequently acted in Jnanambika. He later joined the Harikatha Kalakshepam drama troupe. In 1973, P. A. Thomas gave him a small role in his film Kudumbini, after which he retired from cinema.

He was married to Pankajakshiyamma, with whom he had a son, Vasudevan. Struggling financially, he worked as a server in a tea shop during the last days of his life. He died in 1984 in Pallai.

== Filmography ==
=== As an actor ===
- Balan (1938)
- Gnanambika (1940)
- Kerala Kesari (1951)
- Jenova (1953)
- Kudumbini (1964)

=== As a playback singer ===
- Bhaarathathin Ponvilakkaam as Balan (1938)
- Athisukhamee Jeevitham as Balan (1938)
- Vishaadam Thingum as Jnaanaambika (1940)

=== As a music composer ===
All songs are from Balan (1938)

- Bhaarathathin Ponvilakkaam
- Jayajagadeeshwara
- Jaathakadoshathaale
- Raghukula Nayakane
- Ha Sahajasaayoojyame
- Durnnaya Jeevithame
- Athisukhamee Jeevitham
- Aaghoshangalenthu Cheyyaam
- Aadayaabharanaadikondu
- Lokam Anaswarame
- Sree Vaasudeva Parane
- Deenadayaaparane
- Snehame Slaakhyam
- Madanavilolane Naadha
- Maanini Maniyothum
- Chethoharamaam madyapaanamathe
- Parama Guruve
- Shock Shock
- Kaaminimaar
- Maaran Khorasarangal
- Enoodidham Kadhikkanadhikaparibhavam
- Bhakthaparaayana
- Aaha Malsodari
