= Balan (film) =

- Theatrical release poster
- Directed by: S. Nottani
- Screenplay by: Muthukulam Raghavan Pillai
- Based on: Vidhiyum Mrs. Nayarum by A. Sundaram
- Produced by: T. R. Sundaram
- Starring: K. K. Aroor; M. K. Kamalam; Master Madanagopal; M. V. Shanku; K. Gopinath; Alleppey Vincent; C. O. N. Nambiar; K. N. Lakshmi; Baby Malathi
- Cinematography: Bado Gushwalker
- Edited by: Varghese and K.D. George
- Music by: K. K. Aroor; Ibrahim
- Production company: Modern Theatres
- Distributed by: Shyamala Pictures
- Release date: 19 January 1938
- Country: India
- Language: Malayalam

Balan is a lost 1938 Indian Malayalam-language drama film produced by T. R. Sundaram under the banner of Modern Theatres, directed by S. Nottani and written by Muthukulam Raghavan Pillai. It is notable for being the first sound film in the Malayalam language, and the third feature film in Malayalam cinema after Vigathakumaran and Marthanda Varma. Based on the short story Vidhiyum Mrs. Nayarum by A. Sundaram. The film is a melodrama about the struggle of two orphaned children. The film stars K. K. Aroor in the title role and M. K. Kamalam as the female lead, with Master Madanagopal, M. V. Shanku, K. Gopinath, Alleppey Vincent and C. O. N. Nambiar in supporting roles.

The film was produced by T. R. Sundaram, a Salem-based producer under the banner of Modern Theatres. German cinematographer Bado Gushwalker handled the camera while Varghese and K.D. George did the editing. The film's music was composed by K. K. Aroor, himself, with lyrics written by Muthukulam Raghavan Pillai. Balan is the first Malayalam film to have a soundtrack. The sound of the film was recorded using German-made technology. The film features twenty-three songs. Balan was shot in Madras and on the sets of Powerful Studios. The filming of the film was done in five months.

== Reception ==
Balan was released with high expectations on 19 January 1938. It was the only Malayalam film to be produced and released that year. Despite numerous technical flaws, it received critical acclaim, with praise for the film's social theme. The film was a major box office success, becoming the first commercially successful Malayalam film. Because only a few stills and the songbook are known to survive, it is a lost film. K. K. Aroor and Alleppey Vincent also starred in the second Malayalam talkie Gnanambika two years later.

== Cast ==
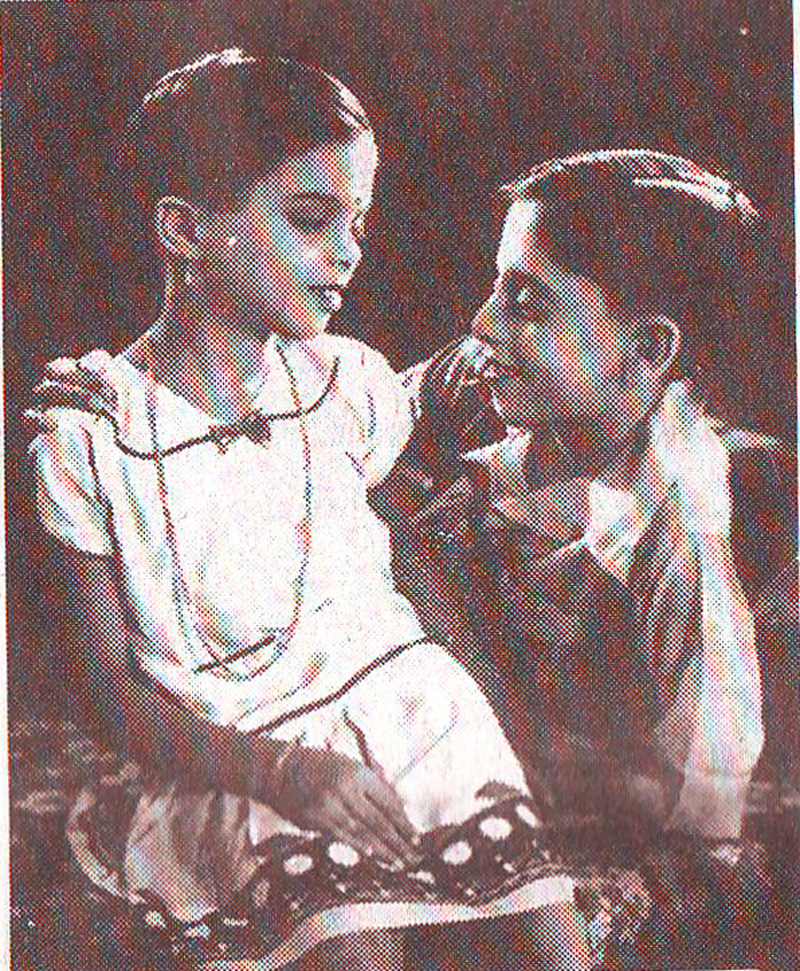
Screenshot from this first Malayalam sound movie, released in 1938

- AP Padmanabha Menon
- Ammu
- KN Lakshmi
- Master Madana Gopalan as young Balan
- K Gopinath
- MKK Nambyar
- Sivanandan
- AB Payas
- MV Shanku
- CON Nambyar
- Subhadra
- Parukkutty
- Baby Malathi
- Baby Kausalya

ref

== Production ==
There were several attempts to make a talkie in Malayalam, right from the days Vigathakumaran (1928) got released. One among them, A. Sundaram Pillai, had an unpublished story entitled Vidhiyum Mrs. Nayarum (Mrs. Nair and the Fate) with him. He contacted several production houses to adapt this story into a film. Several of his attempts failed, but at last he got a letter from T. R. Sundaram, a Tamil-based producer informing him that he was ready to produce the film. T. R. Sundaram owned the production company Modern Theatres, which he established in 1936. A. Sundaram had already finished casting, which included several theatre artists from Malayalam. K. Kunjunair, credited as K. K. Aroor in the film, of the Kottakkal Nataka Samithi was selected to do the title role. M. K. Kamalam was chosen as the heroine.

A. Sundaram wanted himself to direct the film, but later agreed to sign S. Nottani as the director. Nottani rejected the screenplay of A. Sundaram and wanted to rewrite it. Eventually, he signed renowned writer Muthukulam Raghavan Pillai, who wrote the screenplay and dialogues, as well as lyrics for the songs. The filming was started on 17 August 1937 from Salem. After completing a length of 2000 feat, T. R. Sundaram dropped the project following differences in opinion with A. Sundaram. T. R. Sundaram had spent ₹ 30,000 on the project. A. Sundaram himself financed the project thereafter. Most parts of the film was shot from Powerful Studios. The filming was completed within five months, in December 1937. A. Sundaram could not find a distributor for many months. Later, Shyamala Pictures, Madras bought the rights and the film was released on 19 January 1938. The theatrical release poster of Balan read Malayalathile adyathe social padam vegam varunnu (The first social film in Malayalam is coming out soon).

== Songs ==
Balan's music was composed by K. K. Aroor, who played the male lead, and Ibrahim. It had 23 songs, most of them recorded by the actors themselves. K. N. Lakshmi, K. K. Aroor, M. K. Kamalam and Master Madanagopan are the credited singers. Playback singing was not possible that time, so the producer had to sign actors those who could excel in singing also.

== Legacy ==
The film was a milestone in Malayalam film history, not only for being the first talkie, but also for being one of the first commercially successful films. Through the film, Alleppey Vincent became the first "speaking person" of Malayalam cinema, K. K. Aroor the first "speaking hero" and M. K. Kamalam the first "speaking heroine". "Hello Mister" was the first recorded sound, which was in the voice of Alleppey Vincent. The film is considered lost; only the song book and a few stills survive to this day. The film also introduced many of early Malayalam cinema's recurring archetypes, including the evil step-mother and innocent orphans.

== See also ==
- Malayalam cinema
- Vigathakumaran
- Marthanda Varma (film)
