= Padayottam (2018 film) =

- Directed by: Rafeek Ibrahim
- Screenplay by: Ajai Rahul; Arun Anirudhan; Sonu Surendran
- Story by: Ajai Rahul
- Produced by: Sophia Paul
- Starring: Biju Menon; Rahul Dev; Anu Sithara; Dileesh Pothan; Saiju Kurup; Basil Joseph
- Cinematography: Satheesh Kurup
- Edited by: Ratheesh Raj
- Music by: Prashant Pillai
- Production company: Weekend Blockbusters
- Distributed by: Weekend Blockbusters Release
- Release date: 14 September 2018
- Running time: 160 min
- Country: India
- Language: Malayalam

Padayottam is an Indian Malayalam-language black comedy gangster film directed by Rafeek Ibrahim (in his directorial debut) with Biju Menon in the lead role. The film was remade in Telugu as Anaganaga Oka Rowdy (2021) starring Sumanth.

== Plot ==
Senan, Sree, Renju and Pinku are small-time gangsters in the heart of Thiruvananthapuram. Pinku gets beaten up one night and ends up in the hospital. The gang vows revenge and try to track down Pinku's assailant from a phone left behind. Their revenge is cut short when they find the phone's owner is from Kasargode, all the way at the other end of the state. Senan suggests they enlist the help of the dreaded goon Chenkal Reghu. The adventure starts coming apart as soon as they hit the road. Reghu's newly repaired car breaks down, forcing them to hitch a ride on a college tour bus. They meet up with Sree's friend - Dominic who offers to lodge them at the house of his boss named Baba, whose daughter's marriage is to take place the next day.

While the gang stays there, the soon-to-be bride Sahiba elopes that night. Baba tasks his gangster friend RD to get her back. The gang reluctantly takes leave of Baba and seek out local gangster Britto to help them get to Kasargode. The eternally suicidal Britto decides to pull a hit along the way, and ends up ditching them to make his escape. Being the good soul he is, Britto arranges a freight truck to get them to their destination. After an uneventful ride, the gang reach Kasargode the next morning and meet their local contact - Ratheesh, who informs them that the man they are pursuing is Dulquer Salman, the elder son of a major gangster named Samad. They stake out Samad's house, but come to learn that Salman had been kidnapped the previous night.

Assuming Reghu and gang were behind the kidnapping, Samad holds Pinku and Reghu's mother hostage and demands Reghu to bring back Salman. Reghu decides to resolve things by tracking down Salman. Sree sends over Salman's picture to Dominic, who recognizes him as the same man who had eloped with Sahiba. RD had caught them and brought Sahiba back home. Not knowing who she had run away with, Baba had authorized RD to execute him. RD, who had an axe to grind with Samad, had conveniently failed to reveal Salman's identity. Baba desperately tries to get Salman back from RD to no avail. Reghu and the gang try to get to RD's hideout in Kochi while Ratheesh flees with their money fearing repercussions from Samad. RD gets pulled over at a police checkpoint and Salman uses the opportunity to make a run for it.

An eventful journey brings Reghu and gang to Kochi, inadvertently finding Ratheesh on the way. However, Reghu gets frustrated with Renju's antics and leaves in a fit of anger. Assisted by Dominic and a motley crew of veteran thugs, Senan and the others decide to press on. However, when they meet RD at his hideout, he reveals that he had topped off Salman already. They are shown a corpse ready to be buried, but then it appears to be alive. In the ensuing confusion, Reghu shows up and fights off RD and his gang. During the fight, he finds Salman alive in a room, who escapes in RD's car. RD stops the fight by firing his gun, but unwittingly shoots down a huge vat, which crushes him. Reghu and gang chase Salman and finally get a hold of him. They convince him to accompany them to Samad to resolve the whole mess.

Salman offers to call his father and resolve the issue right there, on the condition that they help him elope with Sahiba again. Reghu and gang grudgingly agree and arrange to spring Sahiba from her home. Salman honours his part of the agreement, assuring Samad that Reghu and gang were innocent of his abduction. On reaching Thiruvananthapuram, Reghu takes Salman to make him apologize to Pinku, but Pinku is visibly confused on seeing Salman. Pinku reveals that it was Salman's 10-year-old brother who had beaten him up. He had been indicating the kid who was in the background of the photo on Salman's phone. The gang realizes the whole trip was a misadventure, where an irate Reghu beats them up before leaving home with his mother.

In a mid-credits scene, Senan and gang arrive at Reghu's house to apologise, but are interrupted when Britto offers a gift, having kidnapped Salman again.

== Cast ==
- Biju Menon as Chengal Reghu
- Rahul Dev as Mangalapuram Samad
- Ravi Singh as Ramdev [RD]
- Dileesh Pothan as Senan
- Saiju Kurup as Sreekuttan
- Sudhi Koppa as Renju
- Basil Joseph as Pinku
- Suresh Krishna as Baba
- Hareesh Kanaran as Kasargode Ratheesh
- Anu Sithara as Meera
- Ganapathi S Poduval as Dulquer Salman
- Aima Rosmy Sebastian as Sahiba
- Sethu Lakshmi as Lalithakkan
- Lijo Jose Pellissery as 'Chavakkad' Britto
- Kochu Preman as Ponnappan Sir
- Pradeep Kottayam
- Neha Saxena in cameo appearance as wedding guest

== Production ==
The title Padayottam was taken from the 1982 Malayalam film of the same name. The title's permission was granted by its production house and filmmaker Jijo Punnoose.

== Music ==
The film score was composed and arranged by Prashant Pillai, song lyrics were written by Hari Narayanan.

== Release ==
Padayottam was released in India on 14 September 2018.

== Reception ==
A review on SilverScreen India praised the cast, but acknowledged "a partially incoherent story-line" of the film.
