= Vidhi Thanna Vilakku =

- Song book cover
- Directed by: S. S. Rajan
- Written by: Muthukulam Raghavan Pillai
- Screenplay by: Muthukulam Raghavan Pillai
- Produced by: Guruvayoorappan Pictures
- Starring: Sathyan; Ragini; Sukumari; Muthukulam Raghavan Pillai
- Cinematography: U. Rajagopal
- Music by: V. Dakshinamoorthy
- Production company: Guruvayoorappan Pictures
- Release date: 5 October 1962
- Country: India
- Language: Malayalam

Vidhi Thanna Vilakku is a 1962 Indian Malayalam-language film, directed by S. S. Rajan and produced by Guruvayoorappan Pictures. The film stars Sathyan, Ragini, Sukumari and Muthukulam Raghavan Pillai.

== Cast ==
- Sathyan
- Ragini
- Sukumari
- Muthukulam Raghavan Pillai
- Ramesh
- Sebastian Kunjukunju Bhagavathar
- Bahadoor
- Chandni
- GK Pillai
- Rajam
- S. P. Pillai

== Soundtrack ==
The music was composed by V. Dakshinamoorthy and lyrics were written by P. Bhaskaran and Abhayadev.

Song	Singers	Lyrics
"Chandanakkinnam"	P. Leela, P. B. Sreenivas	P. Bhaskaran
"Chundil Mandahaasam"	K. J. Yesudas	P. Bhaskaran
"Guruvayoor Puresha"	P. Leela	Abhayadev
"Kaaranamenthe Paartha"	P. Leela, Vinodini	P. Bhaskaran
"Kaarunya Saagarane" (Guruvayupuresa)	P. Leela, A. P. Komala	Abhayadev
"Kandaalum Kandaalum"	V. Dakshinamoorthy, Shantha P. Nair	P. Bhaskaran
"Kannadachaalum"	K. J. Yesudas, P. Leela	P. Bhaskaran
"Karakku Kampani"	P. B. Sreenivas	P. Bhaskaran
"Thuduthudunnaneyulloru"	P. Leela, Chorus	P. Bhaskaran
Vaanin Madithattil	P Susheela	Abhayadev
