= Kerala Kesari =

- Directed by: V. Krishnan
- Written by: V. K. Kumar
- Screenplay by: N. Shankarapillai
- Produced by: Vaikkam Vasudevan Nair
- Starring: Kalaikkal Kumaran; K. K. Aroor; Durga Varma
- Cinematography: P. K. Madhavan Nair
- Edited by: K. D. George
- Music by: Jnanamani
- Distributed by: Geo Release
- Release date: 17 May 1951
- Country: India
- Language: Malayalam

Kerala Kesari is a 1951 Indian Malayalam-language film, directed by V. Krishnan and produced by Vaikkam Vasudevan Nair. The film stars K. K. Aroor and Durga Varma in lead roles. The film had musical score by Jnanamani.

== Cast ==
- K. K. Aroor
- Durga Varma
- Thankam Vasudevan Nair
- K. S. Parvathy
- Paravoor Bharathan
- Vaikkam Vasudevan Nair
- Kalaikkal Kumaran
