= Sebastian Kunjukunju Bhagavathar =

Indian actor (1901–1985)

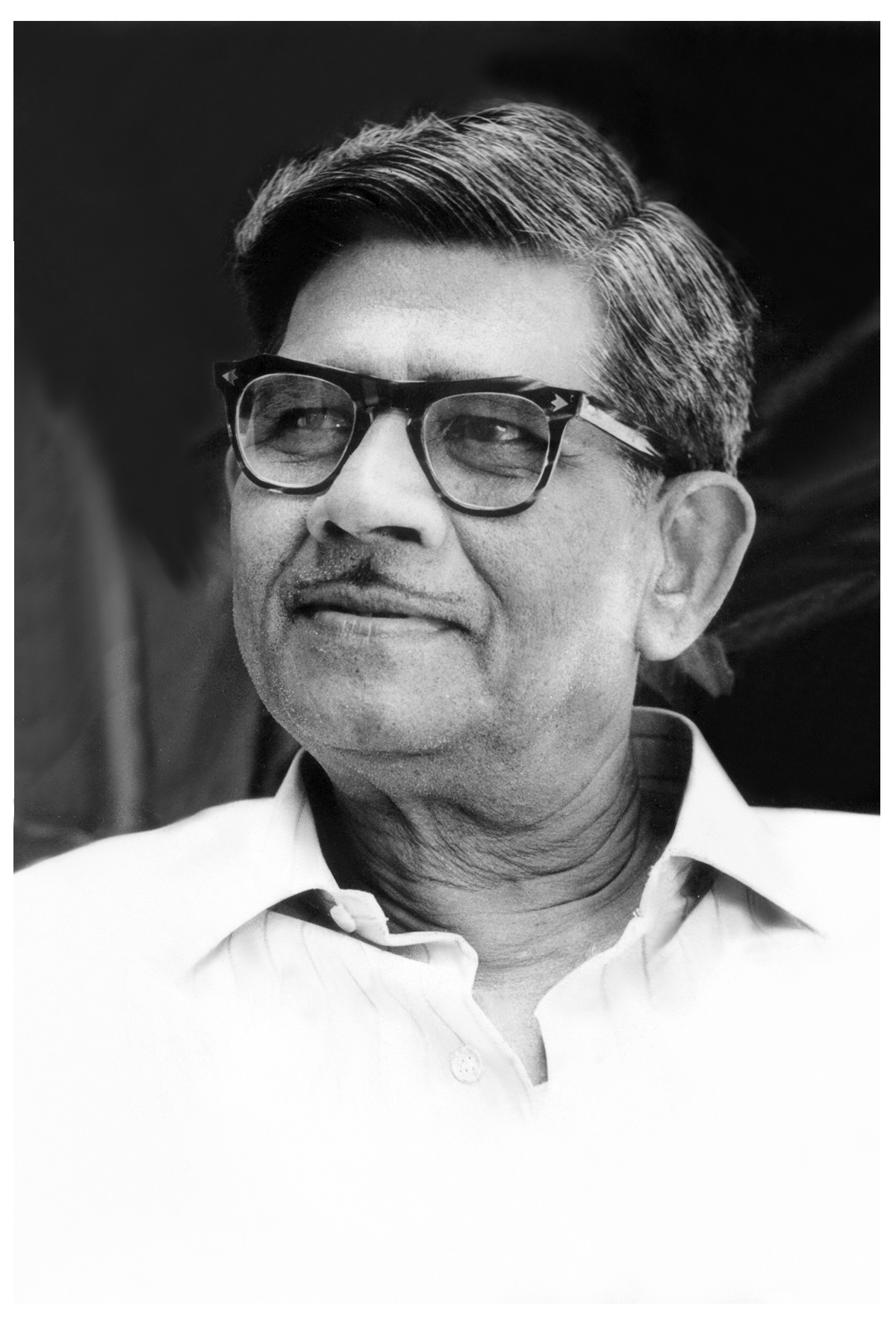
- Born: 9 February 1901; Ambalappuzha, Alappuzha district
- Died: 19 January 1985 (aged 83)
- Citizenship: India
- Occupations: Singer, actor

Sebastian Kunjukunju Bhagavathar (9 February 1901 in Ambalappuzha, Alappuzha district – 1985) was a Malayalam theatre actor, singer, and author. He is known for his contributions to Malayalam sangeetha natakam (musical operas). Along with Ochira Velukutty, he was responsible for breaking the monotony of musical operas with their 1930 play Karuna, an adaptation of Kumaran Asan's famous poetic piece. Actor Alleppey Vincent was his brother.

== Early life and career ==
Sebastian was born on 9 February 1901 to Pollayil Vincent and Margarita as their second child in Ambalappuzha taluk of Alappuzha district in the Indian state of Kerala. His brother Alleppey Vincent was also a well known person in Malayalam industry who acted in Balan (1938), the first talkie ever made in Malayalam. After initial schooling in his native village, he attended the Leo XIII School in Alappuzha. He later enrolled at St. Albert's High School in Ernakulam. It was at St. Albert's that he joined a Tamil drama troupe and toured several parts of Tamil Nadu before returning to Ernakulam. During his stay in Ernakulam, Kunjukunju was busy with drama and music and paid little attention to his studies. He returned to his home village to look after his ailing father. In 1923, Kunjukunju married Marykutty. She gave her support to his later theatrical ventures.

Kunjukunju's first lead role was in Njanasundari, a Tamil drama translated into Malayalam, which told the story of Prince Plendran and Princess Njanasundari. For next few years after Njanasundari, he could not get any major role in dramas. In 1929, "Royal Cinema & Dramatic Company" staged the drama Parudeesa Nashtam, which was based on John Milton's epic poem Paradise Lost. Kunjukunju played the role of Adam, while Ochira Velukkutty, an actor who is said to have enacted female roles better than real women, played Eve. This is followed by Satyavansavitri, Alliarjuna, Kovalan Charitram, Nallathanka, and Harishchandra. The Kunjukunju–Velukkutty duo was the main attraction of all these dramas as they drew huge crowds.

== Filmography ==
=== As an actor ===
- Vidhi Thanna Vilakku (1962)
- Minnalppadayaali (1959)
- Baalyasakhi (1954)
- Sheriyo Thetto (1953)
- Achan (1952)
- Navalokam (1951)
- Jeevithanouka (1951)
- Gnanambika (1940)

=== As a Singer ===
- "Nin Paadame Sharanam"... Gnanambika (1940)
- "Manojnam"... Jnaanaambika (1940)
- "Mohaname"... Jnaanaambika (1940)
- "Kadhayithu Kelkkaan Sahajare Vaa"... Gnanambika (1940)
- "Sukhamadhuram Sukhamadhuram"... Gnanambika (1940)
- "Aanathalayolam Venna"... Jeevithanouka (1951)

== Awards ==
- 1966: Kerala Sangeetha Nataka Akademi Award
