= Sreemoolanagaram =

Village in Ernakulam District, Kerala, India

Sreemoolanagaram is a small town near Aluva and is a part of the Sreemoolanagaram Grama Panchayat. The Panchayat is a part of Aluva Taluk in Ernakulam District in Kerala, India. The Chowara village is a part of Sreemoolanagaram Panchayat.
