= Gnanambika =

- Promotional poster
- Directed by: S. Nottani
- Written by: C. Madhavan Pillai
- Screenplay by: C. Madhavan Pillai
- Produced by: Annamala Chettiyar
- Starring: K. K. Aroor; Alleppey Vincent; Sebastian Kunjukunju Bhagavathar
- Music by: T. K. Jayarama Iyer
- Release date: 7 April 1940
- Country: India
- Language: Malayalam

Gnanambika is a 1940 Indian Malayalam film, directed by S. Nottani and produced by Annamala Chettiyar. The film stars K. K. Aroor, Alleppey Vincent and Sebastian Kunjukunju Bhagavathar in lead roles. The film had musical score by T. K. Jayarama Iyer.

== Cast ==
- K. K. Aroor
- Alleppey Vincent
- Sebastian Kunjukunju Bhagavathar
- Mavelikkara Ponnamma
- Nanukkuttan
- C. K. Rajam
- M. P. Sanku
- Seethalakshmi
- Mathappan
