= Minnal Murali =

2021 Indian film by Basil Joseph

- Official release poster
- Directed by: Basil Joseph
- Written by: Arun Anirudhan; Justin Mathew
- Produced by: Sophia Paul
- Starring: Tovino Thomas; Guru Somasundaram
- Cinematography: Sameer Thahir
- Edited by: Livingston Mathew
- Music by: Songs: Shaan Rahman; Sushin Shyam; Background Score: Sushin Shyam
- Production company: Weekend Blockbusters
- Distributed by: Netflix
- Release dates: 16 December 2021 (Mumbai Film Festival); 24 December 2021 (Netflix)
- Running time: 159 minutes
- Country: India
- Language: Malayalam
- Budget: ₹20 crore

Minnal Murali (transl. Lightning Murali) is a 2021 Indian Malayalam-language superhero film directed by Basil Joseph and produced by Sophia Paul, under the banner of Weekend Blockbusters. The screenplay is written by Arun Anirudhan and Justin Mathew. The film stars Tovino Thomas and Guru Somasundaram. The story follows the life of Jaison, a young tailor who gains superpowers after being struck by lightning, and transforms into a superhero.

The film was formally announced in January 2019, but due to the extensive pre-production works, the film's principal photography took place during December 2019. Though shooting got disrupted twice following the two waves of the COVID-19 pandemic the makers managed to complete the shoot within July 2021. The film was predominantly shot in Kerala, with few sequences being shot at Hassan in Karnataka. The film score was composed by Sushin Shyam while the songs featured in the film were composed by Shaan Rahman and Sushin Shyam. The cinematography was by Sameer Thahir and Livingston Mathew served as the editor.

The film was set for a theatrical release in late-2020, but was postponed multiple times due to the COVID-19 pandemic. In September 2021, the makers announced that the film would be released directly through the streaming platform Netflix, as a result of closure of theatres due to the pandemic. It premiered at the Mumbai Film Festival on 16 December, and was premiered worldwide on the occasion of Christmas Eve (24 December 2021). It received critical acclaim praising the cast performances (particularly Tovino Thomas and Guru Somasundaram), writing, direction, action sequences, VFX and soundtrack.

== Plot ==
In the 1990s, Jaison, a young tailor from the village of Kurukkanmoola, dreams of building a career in the US, but his plans are hindered by obstacles in his personal life. SI Saajan opposes Jaison's relationship with his daughter Bincy, who is engaged to Aneesh. Aneesh's ex-girlfriend Bruce Lee Biji is also resentful towards him. Meanwhile, Shibu, a social outcast, harbors feelings for his childhood sweetheart Usha, who happens to be the sister of Daasan, a worker in Jaison's father Varkey's tailor shop. Despite Shibu's affection, Usha holds resentment towards him. Furthermore, Usha's daughter requires urgent medical treatment, but they lack the necessary funds.

On Christmas Eve, lightning strikes Jaison and Shibu simultaneously, granting them telekinetic superpowers. Jaison's nephew Josemon believes the lightning caused Jaison's newfound abilities. Shibu, using his superpower, intervenes when Usha is harassed at a teashop to earn her affection. Meanwhile, Jaison's plans to move to the U.S are dashed when Saajan reveals a family secret: Jaison is not Varkey's biological son, but rather the son of Martin, a deceased theater actor. Feeling betrayed, Jaison seeks revenge.

Disguised as Minnal Murali, a character from Martin's unfinished play, Jaison attacks Saajan and others at an event, leaving behind clues that point to his implication. Meanwhile, unbeknownst to Jaison, Daasan has already covered the cost of Usha's daughter's surgery by stealing the money Jaison had saved for his visa application, which was kept in his tailor shop. Shibu, unaware of this development, robs a bank to raise funds. When Jaison discovers his missing savings, he confronts Daasan, filled with rage and sorrow. Later that day, in a fit of anger because Daasan opposed his alliance with Usha, Shibu burns down Jaison's store, resulting in Daasan's death, and frames Minnal Murali in the crime.

Jaison confides in Biji about his alter ego, seeking help to clear his name. Together with Josemon, they attempt to prove Jaison's innocence. The police identify Shibu as the impostor, but he evades capture, leading to a showdown between him and Jaison. During their confrontation on a bus, the driver dies, and the bus hangs perilously over a cliff, which Jaison saves, earning the villagers' respect. As tensions escalate, Shibu's obsession with Usha culminates in tragedy when her house explodes, killing her and her daughter. Grief-stricken, Shibu seeks vengeance, terrorizing a church congregation and trapping Josemon and others. The police enlist Jaison's help, recognizing him as the only one capable of stopping Shibu.

Donning a supersuit, Jaison confronts Shibu at the church. Initially overpowered, Jaison taps into his inner strength, remembering his father's sacrifice, and defeats Shibu, ending his reign of terror. Despite the loss, Jaison earns the villagers' gratitude, while Biji extinguishes the flames. In a voiceover, Jaison pledges to protect the villagers from future threats as Minnal Murali.

== Cast ==
- Tovino Thomas in a dual role as:
  - Jaison Varghese / Minnal Murali, tailor in his foster father Varkey's shop
    - Awan Pookot as a young Jaison
  - Martin Rangakala, a theatre artist and Jaison's biological father
- Guru Somasundaram as Shibu / Minnal Murali (fake), social outcast and teashop worker
  - Sajal as a young Shibu
- Aju Varghese as P. C. Siby Pothan, Jaison's brother-in-law
- Vasisht Umesh as Josemon, Pothan and Jesmi's son
- P. Balachandran as Varkey, Jaison's foster father
  - Benzi Mathews as a young Varkey
- Femina George as "Bruce Lee" Biji, travel agent, karate instructor, and Jaison's girlfriend
- Arya Salim as Jesmi, Varkey's daughter and Jaison's foster sister
- Shelly Kishore as Usha, Daasan's sister and Shibu's love interest
  - Vyshnavi Narayan as young Usha
- Sneha Babu as Bincy, Saajan's daughter and Jaison's ex-girlfriend
- Thennal Abhilash as Appumol, Pothan and Jesmi's daughter
- Harisree Ashokan as Daasan, tailor in Varkey's shop
  - Akhil Anil Kumar as young Dasan
- Baiju as SI Saajan Antony
- Jude Anthany Joseph as Aneesh, Biji's ex-boyfriend and Bincy's fiancé
- Mamukkoya as Sambashivan, Jaison's doctor
- Bijukuttan as Kunjan
- Azees Nedumangad as Chandran
- Rajesh Madhavan as PC Titto
- Gibin Gopinath as PC Dasan
- Harish Pengan as Varieth
- Devi Chandana as Bindhu
- Vishnu Soman as Hari
- Syam Cargoz as Panchayat member
- Kalabhavan Joshy as bus passenger
- Surjith Gopinath as Paachan
- Pauly Valsan as villager
- Rohit Sangwan as villager
- Sudheesh as himself (cameo)
- Basil Joseph as a young politician (cameo)

== Production ==
=== Development ===
"The idea of Minnal Murali was brought to me by writer Arun [Anirudhan] in 2018. Even though it was an interesting idea, it was a massive challenge to make a superhero film in Malayalam. A convincing film in this particular genre was an all set challenge, and if taken up we would have to give in our everything."

— Basil Joseph, on the scripting of Minnal Murali.

In January 2019, Tovino Thomas announced that he will collaborate with Basil Joseph for the second time after Godha (2017), for a superhero film titled Minnal Murali and Sophia Paul bankrolled this project under the Weekend Blockbusters banner. The concept poster of this film was revealed on 21 January 2019, coinciding with the actor's birthday. Basil Joseph worked on the script for the film, while Tovino became busy on his commitments in the upcoming projects. As Tovino completed works on his films, in late-October 2019, Basil Joseph started pre-production works of the film and script reading sessions had consequently began. Arun Anirudhan and Justin Mathew co-wrote the script of the film. Basil Joseph stated that the film drew inspiration from My Dear Kuttichathan (1984).

Basil took supervision of the computer graphics-aspect during the film's scripting stage. In an interview with The Times of India, he said that "I will be working closely with the VFX team in the pre-production stage for developing the storyboards as well as understanding what is possible before we start shooting the movie". Tovino Thomas said that the film falls on the comedy genre, despite being a superhero film and will be "enjoyable to all kinds of audiences". He also said that "the team had planned to present the fantasy element convincingly and realistic in some manner", by saying "If you search online, you would find several instances of those struck by a lightning, experiencing differences in their lives like being able to make a bulb glow for a second or their watches stopping. So, when high voltage courses through the body its dynamics change somewhat. In that way, it's also a realistic movie."

=== Casting ===
During July 2019, Aju Varghese was roped in as one of the cast members in pivotal role. Varghese shared a casting call for the film's lead actress, and invited applications from the age of 20 and 28. In the process, the team had cast Femina George as the heroine, whose character named as "Bruce Lee" Biji. Tamil actor Guru Somasundaram joined the film in a pivotal role. Hollywood stunt choreographer Vlad Rimburg was roped in to supervise the action sequences. The technical crew consisted of cinematographer Sameer Thahir, music directors Shaan Rahman and Sushin Shyam and editor Livingston Mathew. Tovino Thomas trained immensely for his role in this film to play the role of a superhero.

=== Filming ===
The film began production in December 2019 with a puja ceremony and principal photography subsequently began. The team planned to shoot major sequences in Wayanad and Alappuzha districts. After completing major schedules in Alappuzha, the team headed to Wayanad to shoot the sequences further, where few portions were shot in Manathavady during February 2020. The schedule was halted due to the COVID-19 pandemic lockdown in India announced in March 2020. The shoot was resumed a year later in March 2021 in Karnataka, where a huge church set has been replicated, similar to that of a set erected in Kalady by the art direction team, which was vandalised by right-wing groups in May 2020. The team continued their shooting progress in Hassan during the same month, but was halted in April 2021 after Tovino Thomas got diagnosed with COVID-19, and adding to the factors were, the second wave of the pandemic with cases uprising in Kerala. The team resumed shooting in July 2021, when the Kerala government granted permissions to resume film shoots, but was halted immediately as the team found to be violating the COVID-19 protocol. The shooting of this film was wrapped up on 25 July 2021, with the producer Sophia Paul confirming this in an Instagram post. Post-production works simultaneously began and the film's final edit was ready by mid-September 2021.

On 24 May 2020, a temporary church that had been built as part of the film's set near Kalady was vandalized by right-wing groups. The set was made at a cost of around ₹5 million. Several activists of Antharashtra Hindu Parishad (AHP) and Bajrang Dal took credit for destroying the Church-replica by posting on their social media pages about it. AHP's general secretary, Hari Palode, said in a Facebook post that members of AHP, along with members of Bajrang Dal, had demolished the temporary church set as it was placed opposite to a temple. Palode also congratulated the district president of Bajrang Dal, Ernakulam for taking part in the "service work" of razing the church.

Six men, including the leader of Rashtriya Bajarang Dal, have been arrested. All of the accused were levied with sections including seeking to create communal disharmony and robbery. The prime accused in the case, who was previously arrested, was accused of 3 murder cases and many murder attempts. Many from the Malayalam film industry criticized the vandalism. Kerala's chief minister, Pinarayi Vijayan, said that Kerala is no place for games of the communal forces. The vandalism of the film set had incurred financial losses for the production team.

The team resumed shooting for the portions scheduled at Kalady at Hemavati Reservoir with the backdrop of Shettihalli Rosary Church and additional sets created by the production team. Most of the climax portions were shot in this location. The film was made on a budget of ₹18 crore.

== Music ==
The film score was composed by Sushin Shyam. The film features eight songs composed by Shaan Rahman and Sushin Shyam, with both the composers contributing to four tracks each for the album. Manu Manjith served as the primary lyricist for the film songs. The soundtrack album was released by Muzik 247 on 17 December 2021.

== Release ==
Minnal Murali was initially set for theatrical release but had to be rescheduled multiple times in response to the closures of theatres due to COVID-19 pandemic lockdown in India. In July 2021, Netflix acquired the digital streaming rights of the film and planned to stream the film only after 45 days of its theatrical run. However, following the impact of COVID-19 lockdown and the escalation of costs due to the delayed production, the film's producer Sophia Paul opted for a direct-to-streaming release, which was officially confirmed by Netflix in September 2021. On 24 September, the producers announced that Minnal Murali will release worldwide on 24 December 2021, coinciding with Christmas Eve, and will be dubbed and released in Tamil, Telugu, Kannada, Hindi and English along with the original version.

Before the film's digital release, actress Priyanka Chopra who was the chairperson of the Mumbai Film Festival, announced its world premiere on the 2021 edition of the film festival. This was confirmed by Netflix, which released a live online interaction with Tovino, Joseph, Chopra and Smriti Kiran, who was the artistic director of MAMI. The film premiered at 2021 MAMI Mumbai Film Festival on 16 December 2023.

=== Marketing ===
On 25 September 2021, coinciding with the third edition of Tudum Festival sponsored by Netflix, a featurette titled World of Minnal Murali, which has Tovino Thomas and Basil Joseph, sharing an interview about the film was premiered during the live event. For the promotions of the film, Muthoot Group announced an advertising campaign under the title "Minnatte Life" (transl. Let life shine forth), and an advertisement film based on the film's theme was featured.

Prior to the release, the team further collaborated with professional wrestler The Great Khali and cricketer Yuvraj Singh for the promotions of Minnal Murali. A comic book strip inspired from the film was featured in the Malayala Manorama newspaper, four days prior to the release. The audio-visual logo montage of the film was advertised at Ain Dubai, the world's tallest observation wheel located at Dubai, United Arab Emirates. A fan-based bus painting the logo of the film, and named as Minnal Murali Express, were used as part of promoting the film. A parody of the film, presented by Kerala Police, on how the department dealing crimes against women, traffic rule violation, accident prevention and apart from the fictional premise, the video featured snippets of a few major cases the department has solved. Twitter released an emoji of Minnal Murali on 23 December 2021, a day before the film's release.

== Reception ==
=== Critical response ===
On the review aggregator website Rotten Tomatoes, 75% of 8 critics' reviews are positive, with an average rating of 7/10.

S. R. Praveen of The Hindu gave 4 /5 and described the film as a "feel-good bolt from the sky" and noted that "despite banking on familiar superhero tropes, Basil Joseph and Tovino Thomas ensure that their film has a character of its own." Writing for Hindustan Times, Devarsi Ghosh wrote that Minnal Murali has "finally cracked the superhero formula for India." He appreciated the film's characterisation, humour, performances, score and technical aspects calling it "a technical triumph at every turn," while also observing that the film "has the capacity to not just spawn a franchise, but perhaps even become an international hit." Deepa Soman of The Times of India gave 3.5/5, praising the score, performances, VFX, emotional weight, and character development calling the film a "modest and jocular entertainer with both a likeable superhero and villain".

Anna M. M. Vetticad of Firstpost gave the film 4/5 and praised the action sequences and said that the film is a "tender drama about a reluctant hero and the pain that is caused by the trivialisation of those who are viewed as the other". Further saying that "Basil Joseph's film may be a tribute to the Hollywood superhero genre and made on a larger budget than is the norm with Malayalam cinema, but it is also everything that the Malayalam New Wave of the past decade is loved for across India". Sajin Srijith of The New Indian Express stated Minnal Murali as "the best superhero film made in India" further saying "The film does something that most superhero movies rarely do. When the general approach is to make the audience start caring for the hero first, Basil Joseph's film elects to do the same with the villain. Minnal Murali impresses with its originality and its ability to evade comparisons to superheroes from the West." Shubhra Gupta of The Indian Express gave 3.5/5 and wrote that "like all the best superhero movies, this is a coming-of-age film, where a lost child finally finds direction, knowing where he came from, and where he has to go. While the film is aware of its superhero-ness, it never loses sight of the fact that it is set in a real place. This is a tough balance, and Basil Joseph gets it just right." Saibal Chatterjee of NDTV gave 2.5/5 stars and wrote that "That is how Minnal Murali saunters along, embracing an all-too-literal manner and abandoning a sense of irony as it seeks to convince us that a Batman-like superhero is par for the course in Kerala. Are we writing off the film? Not at all. If nothing else, Minnal Murali aims high enough not to fall with a thud when its wings lose strength. It manages to stay afloat even when it dips precariously low." Business Line wrote that the film "stands out and is fun to watch despite a few cliché moments."

Rediff rated the film 3/5 and wrote, "while Basil's idea and thought process of how a superhero is born is meant to win your heart, the plot may not necessarily inspire you." Sify gave 4/5 and stated "Minnal Murali is a fun watch that keeps the possibility of some sequels alive". Nandini Ramanath of Scroll.in stated "Minnal Murali has an improvisational feel that matches the origin story of an unlikely saviour [...] Despite being overstretched, the saga of two superheroes for the price of a single ticket benefits from being pitched at the right scale." Sowmya Rajendran of The News Minute gave 4/5 and stated "Minnal Murali hides its surprises well, and just when you've settled down to watch a comedy about a buffoonish superhero, it changes the game [...] Everyone knows that the superhero will save the day, but it requires superhuman effort to create a film that grabs your attention and makes you watch till the end, and Minnal Murali certainly ticks that box."

=== Audience viewership ===
It is the third Indian film to be in Netflix's Global Top 10 list of non-English Movies. According to LiveMint, more than 5.9 million viewing hours being recorded for the film during its premiere on 24 December 2021.

== Awards and nominations ==
| Award | Category | Recipient | Result | Ref. |
|---|---|---|---|---|
| 52nd Kerala State Film Awards | Best Male Playback Singer | Pradeep Kumar | Won | |
| 52nd Kerala State Film Awards | Best Costume Designer | Melvy J | Won | |
| 52nd Kerala State Film Awards | Best Sound Mixing | Justin Jose | Won | |
| 52nd Kerala State Film Awards | Best Visual Effects | Andrew D'Cruz | Won | |
| 45th Kerala Film Critics Association Awards | Second Best Film | Basil Joseph | Won | |
| 45th Kerala Film Critics Association Awards | Best Art Director | Manu Jagadh | Won | |
| 10th South Indian International Movie Awards | Best Film (Malayalam) | Weekend Blockbusters | Won | |
| 10th South Indian International Movie Awards | Best Actor (Malayalam) | Tovino Thomas | Won | |
| 10th South Indian International Movie Awards | Best Director (Malayalam) | Basil Joseph | Nominated | |
| 10th South Indian International Movie Awards | Best Debutant Actress (Malayalam) | Femina George | Nominated | |
| 10th South Indian International Movie Awards | Best Actress in a Supporting Role (Malayalam) | Shelly Kishore | Nominated | |
| 10th South Indian International Movie Awards | Best Actor in a Negative Role (Malayalam) | Guru Somasundaram | Won | |
| 10th South Indian International Movie Awards | Best Actor in a Comedy Role (Malayalam) | Aju Varghese | Nominated | |
| 10th South Indian International Movie Awards | Best Male Playback Singer (Malayalam) | Mithun Jayaraj | Won | |
| 10th South Indian International Movie Awards | Best Lyricist (Malayalam) | Manu Manjith | Nominated | |
| 10th South Indian International Movie Awards | Best Cinematographer (Malayalam) | Sameer Thahir | Nominated | |
| Asian Academy Creative Awards | Best Direction (Fiction) | Basil Joseph | Won | |

== Sequel ==
In a 2022 interview, actor Tovino Thomas said that a sequel for the film is being planned but it will happen in due course of time.

== Other media ==
A graphic novel Minnal Murali Strikes Again was launched by Amar Chitra Katha at 2024 Comic Con India.

== See also ==
- List of Indian superhero films
