= Bible Ki Kahaniyan =

Indian television series based on the Old Testament

- DVD cover of Bible Ki Kahaniyan.
- Genre: Drama; Christian
- Based on: Bible
- Developed by: Navodaya Appachan
- Written by: Bhushan Banmali; Zackaria
- Directed by: Rajeev Kumar; Mathew Paul; Isaac Thomas Kottukapally; Jijo; Raghunath Paleri
- Creative director: Jijo Punnoose
- Starring: See Cast
- Voices of: Arvind Mehra; Lalit Tiwari
- Narrated by: Lalit Tiwari
- Theme music composer: Karthik Raja
- Opening theme: "Ashkon se Jisne Seenchi Zameen" by Karthik Raja
- Composers: Louis Banks; Mohan Sitara; Vanraj Bhatia; Karthik Raja; Sharreth
- Country of origin: India
- Original language: Hindi
- No. of seasons: 1
- No. of episodes: 6

Production
- Producer: Jose Punnose
- Cinematography: Ashwini Kaul; Ramachandrababu
- Editors: Raghupathy; T. R. Shekhar
- Camera setup: Single-camera
- Running time: 50 minutes
- Production company: Navodaya Studio

Original release
- Network: DD National
- Release: 20 December 1992 – 1996

Bible Ki Kahaniyan (transl. Stories from the Bible) is an Indian Hindi-language television program based upon scriptures from the Bible. The production aspired to complete both Old Testament and New Testament narratives of the Bible but was later discontinued after covering the Patriarch narrative in the Book of Genesis. It was produced by Appachan through his Navodaya Studio and was broadcast on DD National from 1992 to mid 1993 and again, concluding with the remaining episodes, in 1996.

== Premise ==
The series follows these narrative arcs from the Bible:

- Adam & Eve
- Noah's Ark
- Tower of Babel
- Story of Abraham
- Story of Isaac (Genesis 24:63–64, 25:21–22)
- Story of Jacob (Genesis 27:31–44, 28:1–5)

== Cast ==
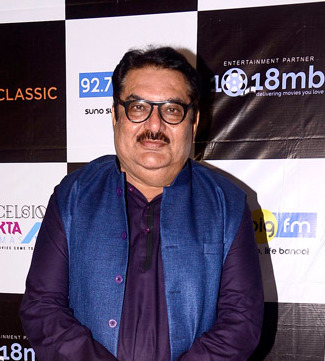
Raza Murad as Noah

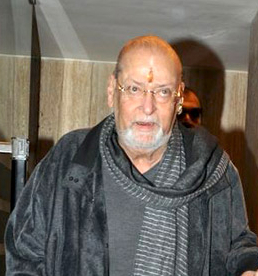
Shammi Kapoor as Nimrod

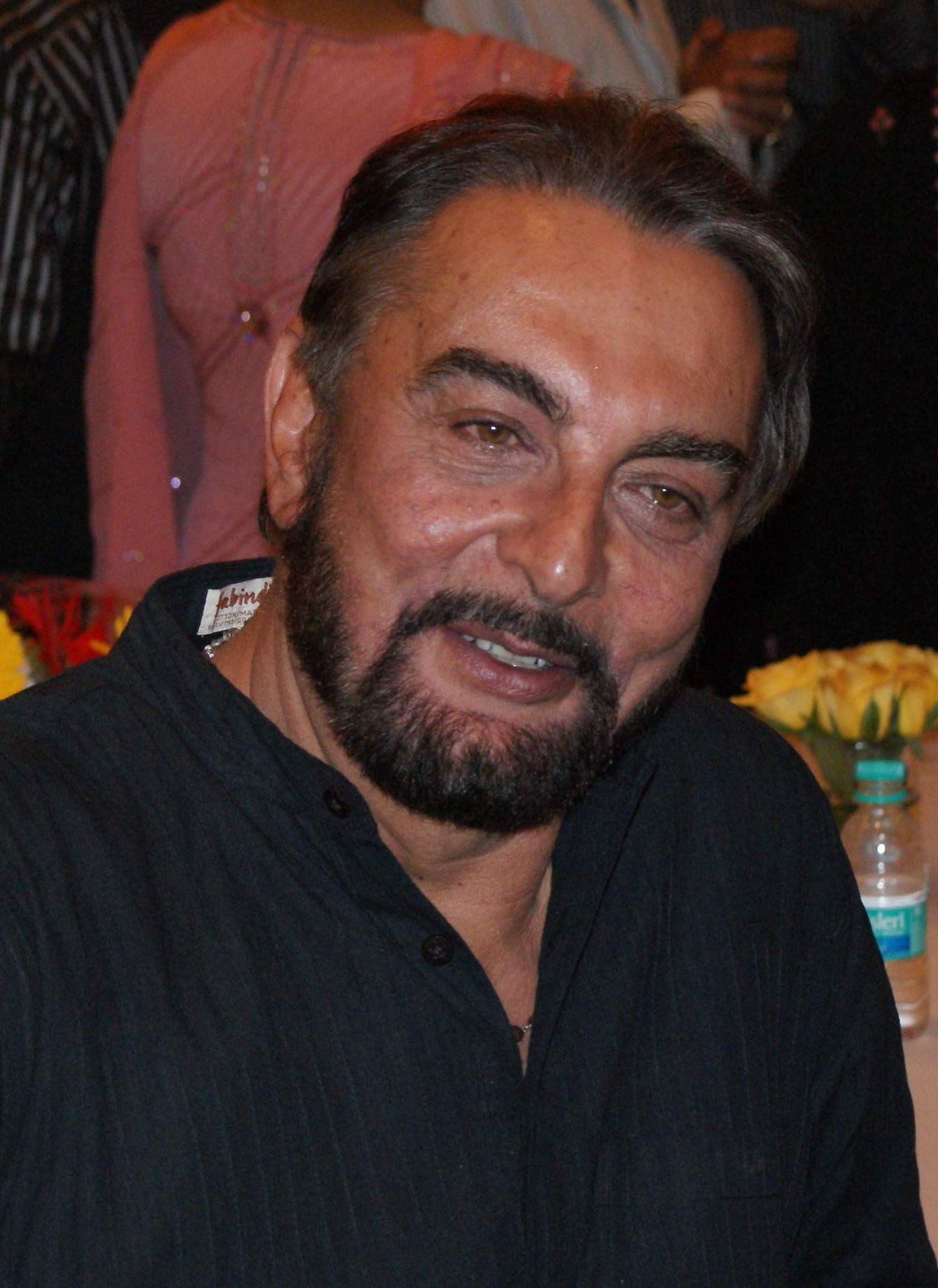
Kabir Bedi as Abraham
- Lalit Tiwari as Narrator
- Arvind Mehra as Voice of God
- Mother Teresa as Herself(Regarding the episode about Noah's ark)
- Daman Maan as Adam
- Soham as Eve
- Varun Vardhan as Cain
- Rajesh Kapoor as Abel
- Raza Murad as Noah
- Asha Sharma as Noah's wife
- Leela Panicker
- Urmila Matondkar as Noah's wife's niece
- Kothuku Nanappan
- Shammi Kapoor as Nimrod
- Jagannathan as Manokh
- Misha as Aman
- Sneha as Nimrod's wife
- Kabir Bedi as Abraham
- Radha Seth as Sarah
- Anamika as Hagar
- Surendra Pal as Eliezer
- Raja Bundela as Lot
- Vishwajeet Pradhan as Nimuk
- Seshad Khan as Ishmael
- Akbar Khan as Amorite/Main priest
- Karan Saluja as King of Sodom/Bethuel
- Bhushan Banmali as Hittite
- Ravi Vaswani/Rajendra Gupta as Laban
- Mohan Gokhale/Kurush Deboo as Isaac
- Mita Vashisht/Neelima Azeem as Rebecca
- Rita Bhaduri as Deborah
- Kanwaljit as Jacob
- Salil Shukla as Young Jacob
- Janak Toprani as Esau
- Master Patnaik as Young Esau
- Satish Kapoor as Abimelech
- Vijay Mehta as Phicol
- Virendra Saxena as Ahusat
- Sanofar as Altamash
- Aruna Sangal as Cannanite priestess
- Ketan Merchant/Prince George as Hittite kids
- Winnie Paranjpe as Leah
- Sunila Karambelkar as Rachel
- Vasudev Bhatt as Ibduil
- Tamara George as Bilhah
- Chanda as Zilpah
- Saba as Laban's wife
- Aakash Chopra as Reuben

== Background and production ==
Jijo, the series' creative director, based his chief reference point on novelist James Michener's The Source, a book that talks about the "pains and passions of the people in Biblical times". Casting was done by Anant Mahadevan and Meenakshi Thakkur and the characters were played by some of the important actors from Bollywood. Much of the production work was done by people from the Malayalam film industry based in the state of Kerala. (Note: Kerala has a significant Christian minority, especially the historical community of Saint Thomas Christians.) Indian historian George Menachery served as the research director, Sabu Cyril was the art director and Sunny Joseph worked on title photography, with additional cinematography by Ashok Kumar, the series had H. Sridhar as a music recordist, SL Puram Anand was the production executive, and Muthuraj served as an assistant art director. Editing work was done on Avid Media Composer and the series was shot on Kodak Super 16. Post-production was handled by Prasad Studios and Seventh Channel Communications.

=== Filming and locations ===
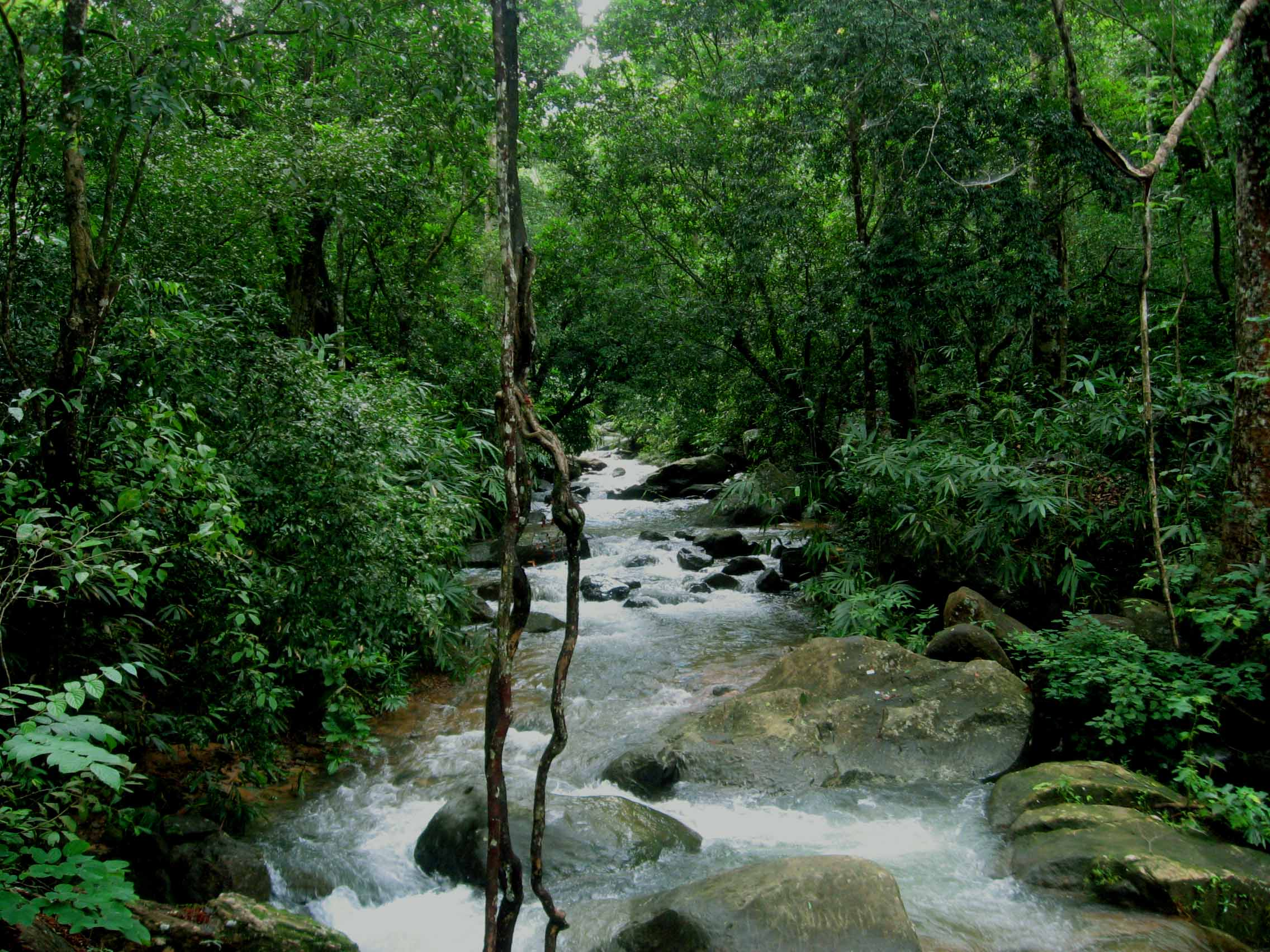
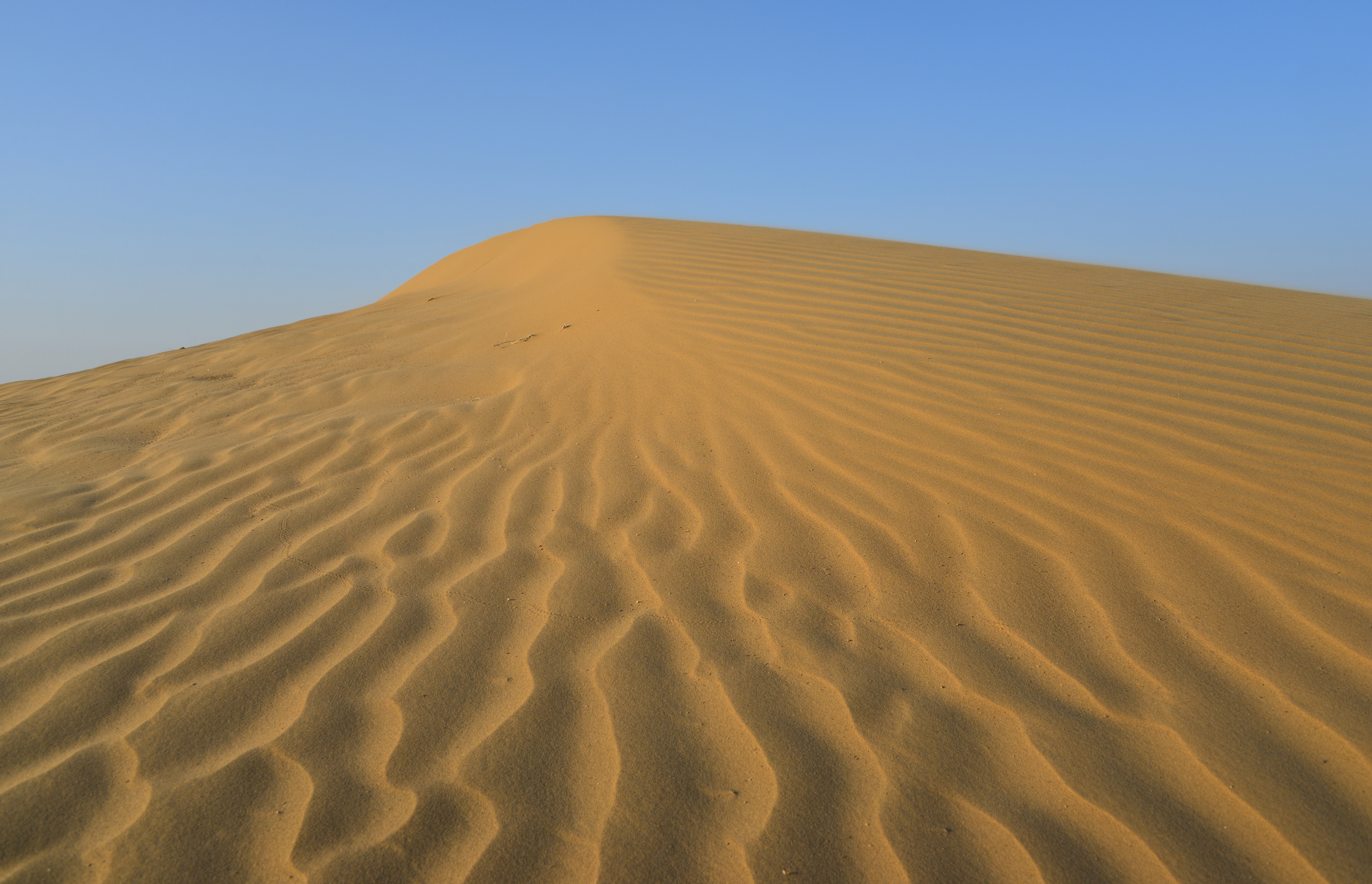
The series was shot in multiple locations in India, pictured here Kallar in Kerala and the Thar Desert in Rajasthan.

The series was shot on different locations in India per the narrative arcs: Kallar and Kanyakumari (Adam and Eve), Kanyakumari (Noah's Ark); episodes beginning with Patriarch arc which required desert scenery were shot in the state of Rajasthan (home of the Thar Desert) mainly in Pushkar and Ajmer; and Tirunelveli in Tamil Nadu (Abraham). (Note: The site of St. Francis Xavier's first missionary activity in India.) The shooting was supported by organisations such as the Kerala Forest and Wildlife Department, Rajasthan Tourism Development Corporation, Ajmer Military School among others and received production assistance from the Government of Israel, Israeli Antiquities Authority, Indian Ministry of Foreign Affairs, and N. Ram of The Hindu.

=== Research ===
Additional people credited and referred to for research work on the Patriarch episodes included Bishop Alphonsus Mathias of the CBCI, Antony Padiyara, Aharon Megged, Asher Weill, T. Carmi, Amihai Mazar, Jack Sasson, Avraham Biran, David Ussishkin, Trudi Dothan, R.J. Zwi Werblowsky, Nissim Ezekiel, Dom Moraes, Leela Naidu.

These institutions were also credited: Bible Lands Museum, Biblical Archaeology Society, British Council - Madras, Connemara Public Library, Eretz Israel Museum, Film Institute - Tel Aviv, Hebrew University, Indian Theosophical Society Library, Jawaharlal Nehru University Library, Jnana Deepa Institute for Philosophy and Theology, Orthodox Theological Seminary - Kottayam, Ratan Tata Library, Reader's Digest Association, National Centre for the Performing Arts, National Geographic Society, Steven Spielberg Jewish Film Archive, Israel Museum, and the University of Madras.

=== Sources consulted ===
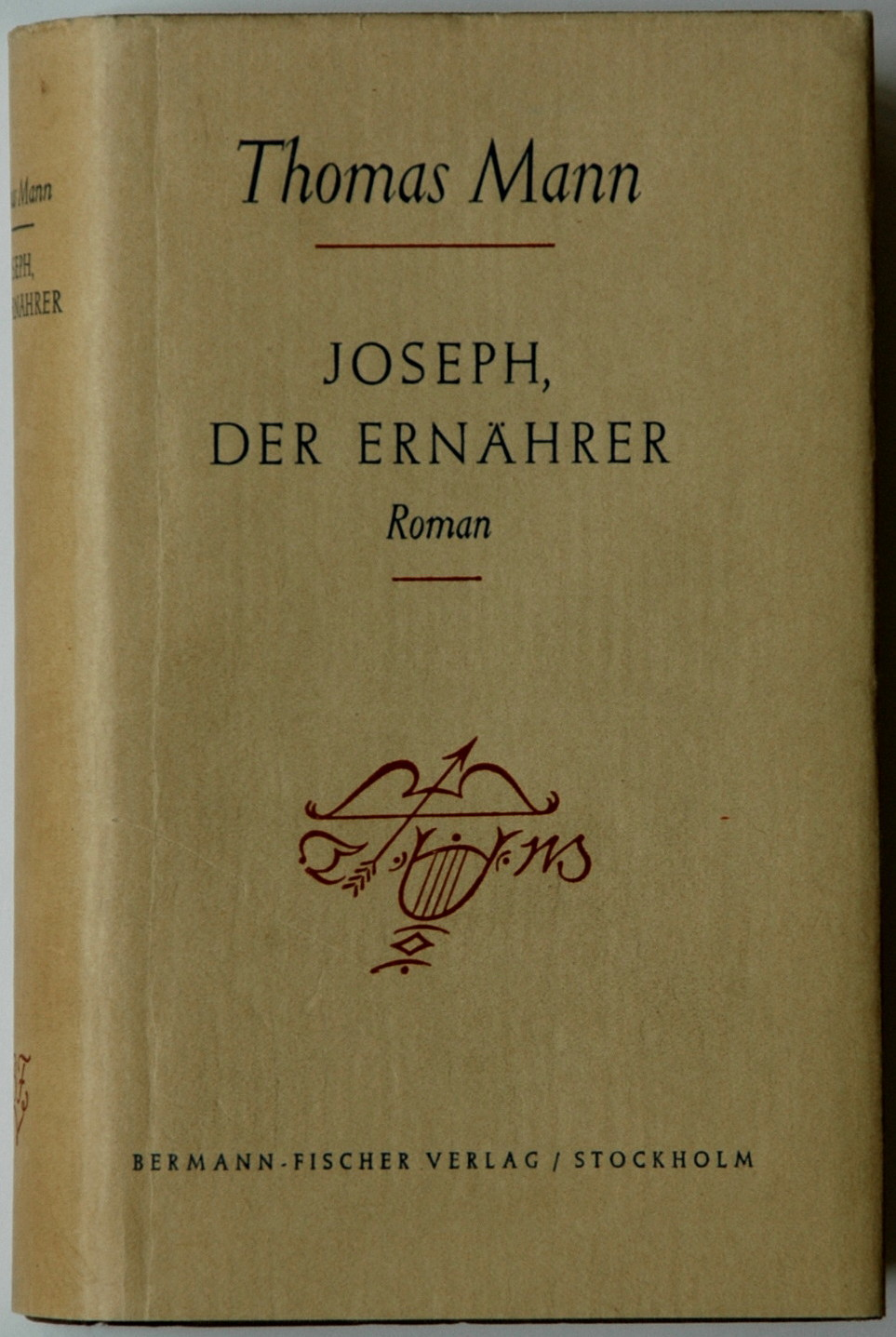
A number of different sources were consulted during research for the series, such as Joseph and His Brothers by Thomas Mann.

Books

A number of religious texts and scholarly sources were consulted for the Patriarch episodes, these included:

Book	Author
The Jerusalem Bible	École Biblique et Archéologique Française de Jérusalem
Pseudepigrapha and Apocryphas	
Midrash	
Antiquities of the Jews	Flavius Josephus
Encyclopaedia Judaica	MacMillan Publishers
Encyclopedia Britannica	Encyclopædia Britannica, Inc.
Jewish Encyclopedia	Funk & Wagnalls
Ancient Near Eastern Texts Relating to the Old Testament	James B. Pritchard
Archaeology and the Old Testament	James B. Pritchard
The Ancient Near East in Pictures	ed. James B. Pritchard
Documents from Old Testament Times	ed. David Winton Thomas
The Interpreter's Dictionary of the Bible	George Arthur Buttrick
The Interpreter's Dictionary of the Bible	ed. Keith Crim
The Jerome Biblical Commentary	Raymond E. Brown
Joseph and His Brothers	Thomas Mann
The Ancient History of the Near East	Henry R. Hall
Ancient Iraq	Georges Roux
Ancient Mesopotamia	A. Leo Oppenheim
At that Time the Canaanites were in the Land	Irit Ziffer
Babylon and the Old Testament	André Parrot
Cradle of Civilization	Samuel Kramer
The Cultural Atlas of Mesopotamia	Michael Roaf
Ebla - An Empire Rediscovered	Paolo Matthiae
The Archives of Ebla	Giovanni Pettinato
Everyday Life in Babylon and Assyria	Georges Contenau
Folklore in the Old Testament	James George Frazer
Genesis	Gerhard von Rad
Life and Language in the Old Testament	Mary Ellen Chase
Myths, Legends and Customs in the Old Testament	Theodor Gaster
Stories from Ancient Canaan	Michael D. Coogan
The Ancient Gods	E. O. James
Cambridge World History	Cambridge University Press
Hazor	Yigael Yadin
Recent Archaeological Discoveries and Biblical Research	William G. Dever
Shechem	G. Ernest Wright
The Art of Warfare in Biblical Lands	Yigael Yadin
The Bible As History	Werner Keller
The Historicity of the Patriarchal Narratives	Thomas L. Thompson
The Old Testament Pseudepigrapha	James H. Charlesworth
Treasures from Bible Times	Alan Millard
Ugarit and the Old Testament	Peter Craigie
Women in Ancient History	Harriet Stowe
Wanderings	Chaim Potok
Dawn of Civilization	Stuart Piggott

Articles

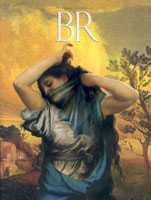
Articles from the Bible Review were used as a point of reference.

Articles referred to in the production of the Patriarch episodes included:

National Geographic

- "Journey into the Living World of the Bible" by Melville Bell Grosvenor (Oct 1967)
- "Splendors of the Bronze Age" by George F. Bass (Dec 1987)
- "Bringing Old Testament Times to Life" by G. Ernest Wright (Dec 1957)

Bible Review/Biblical Archaeology Review

- "The Mothers of Israel" by J. Cheryl Exum (Spring 1986)
- "Patriarchal Burial Site Explored for First Time in 700 Years" by Nancy Miller (May–June 1985)
- "Ekron of the Philistines" by Trude Dothan and Seymour Gitin (Jan/Feb 1990)
- "Elie Borowswki Seeks a Home for his Collection" by Hershel Shanks (Mar/Apr 1985)
- "Exploring Philistine Origins on the Island of Cyprus" by Vassos Karageorghis (Mar/Apr 1984)
- "Jacob Takes his Bride" by Thomas Mann (Spring 1986)

== Music ==
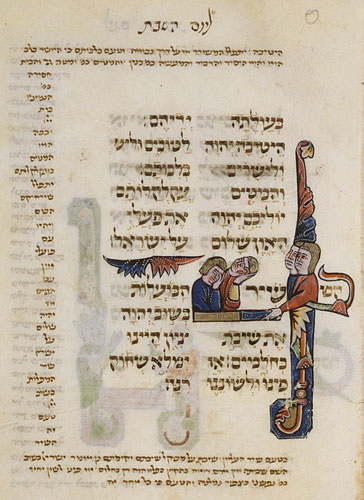
Psalm 126 serves as the opening theme of the series.

The title song by music director Karthik Raja was based on Psalm 126:5–6. The Patriarch episodes had lyrics written by Kaifi Azmi and Hasan Kamaal with songs sung by Kavita Krishnamurti, Vinod Rathod, Suresh Wadkar, and Vani Jairam. These episodes included recreated Hurrian songs by Anne Draffkorn Kilmer, and Ancient Greek music by Gregorio Paniagua. Music from "The Music of the Bible Revealed, Tapes and the Book" by Suzanne Haïk-Vantoura, and "The Rise of Ancient Israel" by the Biblical Archaeology Society was also included in these episodes with Vantoura also serving as an advisor.

== Broadcast and release ==
=== Broadcast ===
The first Episode "Adam and Eve" aired on 20 December 1992 on DD National. DD discontinued the series after few episodes because there was fear of communal tension as some people, particularly in Jammu and Kashmir, had objections with the portrayal of Islamic prophets on screen.

=== Home media ===
A 4 disk set of Bible Ki Kahaniyan was released on DVD by Indus Video in the NTSC standard, containing all six episodes of the series that were broadcast by Doordarshan.

== See also ==
- Christianity in India
- Dayasagar
- Yeshu
- List of Christian films
- List of films based on the Bible
- List of programs broadcast by DD National
- Religious broadcasting
