= Barroz 3D =

2024 film by Mohanlal

Barroz
- Theatrical release poster
- Directed by: Mohanlal
- Dialogues by: Kalavoor Ravikumar
- Based on: Barroz: Guardian of D'Gama's Treasure by Jijo Punnoose
- Produced by: Antony Perumbavoor
- Starring: Mohanlal; Maya Rao West
- Cinematography: Santosh Sivan
- Edited by: B. Ajithkumar
- Music by: Songs: Lydian Nadhaswaram; Fernando Guerreiro; Miguel Guerreiro; Score: Mark Killian
- Production company: Aashirvad Cinemas
- Distributed by: Aashirvad Release (India); Phars Film (overseas); Aashirvad Cinemas Co. LLC (overseas)
- Release date: 25 December 2024
- Running time: 154 minutes
- Country: India
- Language: Malayalam
- Budget: ₹80–150 crore
- Box office: ₹17.48 crore (Note: Barroz grossed ₹17.48 crore worldwide according to Koimoi.)

Barroz (also marketed as Barroz 3D – Guardian of Treasures) is a 2024 Indian children's fantasy film directed by Mohanlal, in his directorial debut, and produced by Antony Perumbavoor's Aashirvad Cinemas. The film stars Mohanlal in the titular role, alongside Maya Rao West, Cesar Lorente Raton, Ignacio Mateos, Kallirroi Tziafeta, Nerea Camacho and Tuhin Menon.The story centers on Barroz, a mysterious, centuries-old guardian spirit entrusted with protecting the hidden treasure of Vasco da Gama. Bound by an ancient spell, Barroz cannot leave his post or hand over the treasure to just anyone. Everything changes when a young girl enters his life.

Barroz 3D was announced in April 2019, which was originally written by Jijo Punnoose based on his novel Barroz: Guardian of D'Gama's Treasure. Pre-production works continued for over a year. Principal photography for the film began in March 2021, but was interrupted by the COVID-19 pandemic, prompting changes to the story, screenplay, and cast. Mohanlal and T. K. Rajeev Kumar collaborated to rewrite the scenes, characters, and locations, leading to Punnoose's exit from the film and forfeiting his credits

Filming restarted in December 2021 and wrapped up in July 2022, where the film was predominantly shot in Kochi and Goa, with two songs filmed in Bangkok and Chennai. The film was completely shot in 3D. The original score was composed by Mark Kilian, while Lydian Nadhaswaram, Fernando Guerreiro, and Miguel Guerreiro composed the songs. Santosh Sivan was the cinematographer and B. Ajithkumar was the editor.

Barroz 3D was released in theatres on 25 December 2024, coinciding with Christmas, in 3D. It received negative reviews from critics and audiences alike, with criticism for its script, screenplay, and dialogues. It was a box office bomb.

== Plot ==
Barroz is the story of a loyal servant turned ghost (Mohanlal) who has been guarding the treasure of Cristavao Da Gama since last four centuries not letting anyone get near it

Isa (Maya Rao West) the 13th generation descendant of Da Gama arrives with her father who wants to tear down the palace and build a large casino

There are some evil forces in play as well behind the treasure and the story goes on to explain how Barroz wins the trust of Isa and also fights against the evil people behind the treasure of Da Gama

== Cast ==
- Mohanlal as Barroz, a Malabari slave to Cristóvão da Gama
- Maya Rao West in dual role as:
  - Isa Ron (Voice dubbed by Anna Mariya)
    - Nerea Camacho as Isa Ron (adult; cameo)
  - Isabella da Gama
    - June Vig as Isabella da Gama (kid)
- Tuhin Menon as Ron Madhav, a businessman (Voice dubbed by Vijay Menon)
- Ignacio Mateos as Cristóvão da Gama, Portuguese Viceroy
- Gopalan Adat as Voodoo (motion capture)
  - Bhasi Vaikom as Voodoo (voice)
- Joshua Okesalako as Muwesi Maria, an occultist (Voice-over by Sayanora Philip)
- Kallirroi Tziafeta as Theresa da Gama
- Cesar Lorente Raton as Mendoza, museum curator (Voice dubbed by Anoop Sivasenan)
- Guru Somasundaram as SP Subramanyam IPS, security officer
- Melvin Gregg Kosisochukwu as Masāvana, an African slave
- Amal P. B. as Chotta, a Goan boy of African descent
- Kirtana Kumar as Susan Mathew (Voice-over by Shwetha Menon)
- Komal Sharma as Emcee
- Suneeta Rao as School principal (Voice-over by Lena)
- Manoj Kumar Karki as Minister
- Nikolai as Auctioneer
- Anjana Manuel Joy as Sub-inspector
- Mammooty as the narrator (voice only)
- Pranav Mohanlal as Anonymous, Barroz's medium to Isa (cameo)
- Antony Perumbavoor as Intelligence officer (cameo)
- Lydian Nadhaswaram as Pianist (uncredited cameo)

== Production ==
=== Development ===
On 21 April 2019, Mohanlal announced his directorial debut—a 3D film adaptation of Jijo Punnoose's novel Barroz: Guardian of D'Gama's Treasure. Originally, Mohanlal and T. K. Rajeev Kumar had planned a 3D stage play, seeking guidance from Punnoose, the director of India's first 3D film, My Dear Kuttichathan (1984). However, due to high production cost, the project was put on hold. During their discussion, Mohanlal proposed the idea of adapting Punnoose's novel into a film, with himself as the director. Punnoose agreed. Mohanlal planned to shoot the film in Goa with foreign actors. Described as a "fantasy film for children", the story is rooted in a 17th-century Portuguese-Afro-Indian myth from the Malabar Coast, centering on a hidden treasure belonging to the D'Gama family. The story explores the maritime history of Portugal, Spain, Africa, and India. The myth is locally known as kappiri muthappan. Mohanlal mentioned that it took a year and a half to finalize the screenplay. Though he initially encouraged Punnoose to direct the film, Punnoose declined, leading Mohanlal to consider other directors before deciding to take on the role himself. According to Mohanlal, Punnoose granted him freedom to make changes to the story, as the original premise had a more serious tone, which underwent revisions.

Punnoose discovered the Portuguese-Afro-Indian myth in 1980 while exploring various indigenous fables for India's first 3D film. Eventually, he opted to adapt the kuttichathan myth instead. In 2003, he revisited the subject and crafted a story that he shared with friends. Years later, responding to his colleagues' insistence, Punnoose decided to turn the story into a film in English and Hispanic languages, taking on the role of director. He revised the 2003 story and penned it as a novel in 2017 to claim copyright. It features two primary characters—Barroz, an elderly Afrikaner ghost, and Isabella, a teenage girl of Malayali-Portuguese descent. While Punnoose's screenplay deviated from the novel in terms of setting and narrative technique. Foreign actors were considered for various roles, including that of Barroz. However, the project underwent significant changes in the course of events.

In a 2022 blog, Punnoose provided a detailed explanation of the film's development and its departure from his original work. In mid-2018, Mohanlal and Kumar sought Punnoose's consultation for a 3D stage show. Kumar proposed making the film in Malayalam language, with Mohanlal portraying Barroz. In February 2019, Punnoose changed the character to a Malayali to accommodate Mohanlal, but opted out of directing. Mohanlal then took on the role of director, while Antony Perumbavoor joined as the producer. Punnoose revised the screenplay 22 times to his satisfaction and to the liking of Mohanlal and Antony, while keeping Isabella as the central character. Mohanlal contributed several story elements, which were incorporated into the film.

Preparations for the film were finalized by early January 2020 and filming was set to begin in June. However, their plans were delayed due to the COVID-19 pandemic in India, which affected the set work scheduled for February. The work resumed by the end of 2020. A team of approximately 160 personnel worked at Navodaya Studio at various departments. The extended time allowed for improvements in previsualization, voodoo doll animation, visual effects, and action sequences. Pre-production was completed in March 2021. Production was officially announced on 24 March 2021, with a pooja ceremony held at Navodaya Studio. Filming began in the same month but was interrupted after one week due to the second wave of the COVID-19 pandemic in Kerala. By the time the lockdown restrictions began to ease, Aashirvad Cinemas had shifted their focus to producing films for direct OTT streaming. As a result, there were discussions about shelving Barroz 3D due to its perceived non-viability. However, in November 2021, Mohanlal took the initiative to revive the project, capitalizing on his four-month gap before starting other films.

Considering the challenges posed by the pandemic, including the difficulty of bringing back foreign actors and shooting in distant locations, extensive discussions led to a decision to change the story, screenplay, and performers. In December 2021, Mohanlal and Kumar collaborated to rewrite the scenes, locations, and characters to ensure the film's feasible completion. Mohanlal reimagined his character in line with his successful commercial films to cater to his fans. In May 2022, Jijo expressed his determination to pursue his original plan of directing a film in English and Hispanic languages through his blog, as his original screenplay and production design had not been utilized. This decision ultimately led to Jijo leaving Barroz 3D. He also requested to have his name removed from the screenplay credits.

=== Casting ===
Before Mohanlal took on the roles of actor and director, Punnoose had planned to direct the film as an international project in English and various Hispanic languages. During this phase, he sent the novel to actors like Will Smith, Morgan Freeman, Eddie Murphy, Denzel Washington, and Idris Elba, considering them for the lead role of the Afrikaner ghost.

In July 2019, Mohanlal announced the casting of Spanish actors Paz Vega, Rafael Amargo, and Cesar Lorente Raton in the film through social media. Amargo was cast as Vasco da Gama, while Vega was chosen to portray his wife. Raton, who initially worked in the casting department, was invited to audition for a part and landed in dual roles. Later in September, Mohanlal revealed that American child actress Shayla McCaffrey would play the lead role. In March 2020, Pratap Pothen confirmed his signing for the role of the voodoo doll. Speculations about Prithviraj Sukumaran's casting arose when he was spotted with the crew during the film's pre-production discussions in March. His presence in the cast was confirmed during that same month. Sara Vega, the sister of Paz Vega, replaced her in the role of Teresa da Gama.

Due to the COVID-19 lockdown in India, the film faced delays, leading to the replacement of some major cast members when production resumed in December 2021. Prithviraj opted out of the film due to scheduling conflicts with Kaduva and Aadujeevitham. Tuhin Menon was brought in as his replacement. McCaffrey was replaced by Indo-British actress Maya Rao West due to conflicts with her academic studies and noticeable physical changes. In December 2021, Guru Somasundaram confirmed his casting in the film, who was called by Mohanlal after the release of his film Minnal Murali (2021). He plays a cop and was scheduled to join in February 2022. Komal Sharma was cast in an undisclosed role. Sharma shared her experience of working on the film, highlighting Mohanlal's equal treatment of all cast members regardless of their status as leading stars, newcomers, or children.

=== Filming ===
Principal photography began on 31 March 2021 at sets constructed in Fort Kochi. Before filming began, K. U. Mohanan, who was initially appointed as the cinematographer, was replaced by Santosh Sivan. Sivan described Barroz 3D as "a visual film that doesn't have a conventional story. It's got magical realism, 3D and is VFX heavy". Santhosh Raman oversaw the production design. Filming took place at sets in Navodaya Studio in April. The film prominently features Goa, and the shooting schedule there was planned to start in early August.

Filming, which initially involved 85 crew members, proceeded for a week in Kochi before being halted due to the second COVID-19 lockdown. In May, efforts were focused on caring for the 24 infected cast and crew members and arranging the return of foreign actors to their home countries, as airline operations had been suspended. With Aashirvad Cinemas changing their plans, Barroz 3D came close to cancellation, leading to the dismantling of the treasure cellar set at Navodaya Studio on Antony's instruction. However, in November 2021, Mohanlal revived the film. Due to logistical challenges like bringing back foreign actors and shooting on location, even in nearby places like Goa, the decision was made in December 2021 to change the story, screenplay, and cast. The revised plan involved shooting in and around Kochi, primarily using indoor sets at Navodaya Studio for major filming.

Filming resumed on 26 December 2021, with recasting and reshoots taking place. Portions featuring Prithviraj, shot in April 2021, were scrapped by Mohanlal. From February to April 2022, filming occurred in Kochi. In April, Punnoose assisted in executing a rotating-set mechanism for a scene involving Barroz walking on the walls of the treasure cellar, which was his only involvement after he left the film. A sequence was filmed with gravity illusion technique, which Punnoose implemented it in My Dear Kuttichathan It was followed by a schedule in Goa, which was completed in May. With this, majority of the film's production had been completed, with only two songs remaining. In early July, a song featuring an animation sequence was filmed in Bangkok. The title song was filmed in Chennai by the end of that month which was initially planned to be shot in Portugal. Filming wrapped up on 29 July 2022.

Kumar served as an associate director. In November 2024, speaking about Mohanlal's approach to directing, Sivan said that, unlike other filmmakers, Mohanlal did not give any references to shots from other films, stating, "he is a spontaneous director, and his process is very organic".

=== Post-production ===
The post-production work of the film commenced in 2022 shortly after the conclusion of filming. It took place at Thailand and India, with sound mixing done in Los Angeles. In September 2022, Mohanlal revealed plans to complete post-production and submit the film for certification by the Central Board of Film Certification within the same year. He worked towards completing the film in time for a projected theatrical release within March 2023. Brynley Cadman was the visual effects supervisor and Jonathan Miller was the sound designer.

In August 2023, Mohanlal revealed that most of the re-recording was completed in Los Angeles, with the remaining work continuing in Budapest, Hungary. In February 2024, he shared an image from Sony Pictures Studios in Hollywood, showing Kilian and Miller fine-tuning the music and sound. The final phase of post-production began in Mumbai in August 2024. The crew was in the process of finishing the VFX work and preparing the film for its IMAX release. As a result of the lengthy post-production phase, the film was postponed multiple times from its initial release plan. A private screening for the finished film was held in Mumbai in October 2024.

== Music ==
The film's original score was composed by South African composer Mark Kilian. Three songs were composed by Lydian Nadhaswaram, marking his feature film debut. In addition to that, two fado songs were composed and co-written by Fernando Guerreiro and Miguel Guerreiro. The lyrics were provided by Vinayak Sasikumar, Lakshmi Sreekumar, and Krishnadas Panki. The soundtrack album was released under the Sony Music India label on 20 December 2024.

== Marketing ==
On 26 December 2021, Mohanlal released a promo teaser of the film indicating his roles both as an actor and director. The promo also featured Mohanlal paying tribute to the directors he worked with, besides unveiling his character as the titular role in the film. Coinciding with New Year's Eve (31 December), the makers released the first look poster featuring Mohanlal in a tonsured bald look for the titular character. In a radio interview in Doha in November 2022, Mohanlal stated that the film's trailer would be released in theatres along with Avatar: The Way of Water on 16 December 2022. However, the trailer was not released on that date.

On 24 April 2024, Mohanlal released the behind-the-scenes video of the film, which also revealed the other cast members playing significant roles. In July 2024, a two-part animated series titled as Barroz and Voodoo released as a prelude to the film. The series was conceptualized by Kumar and directed by Sunil Nambu, with musical score composed by Ramesh Narayan. The film's trailer was privately screened for the crew at PVR INOX cinema theatre in Mumbai in early August, and was scheduled to be released on 6 September 2024 at the 3rd edition of IIFA Utsavam award ceremony held at Yas Island, Abu Dhabi. However, the film's postponement and with the event being delayed to three weeks later, also deterred the plans for the launch.

The film's 3D trailer was premiered during the theatrical screenings of Suriya's Kanguva and received praise from fans for the visuals and technical excellence. The trailer was then released online on 19 November in virtual 3D format, launched by actor Amitabh Bachchan on his X (formerly Twitter) handle. In the weeks leading up to the film's release since November 2024, Mohanlal released posters that revealed the principal cast on his social media accounts. A moster was later released on 9 December. The trailer for the film's Hindi-dubbed version was launched on 11 December, at the Oberoi Mall in Mumbai, with Akshay Kumar being present for the event. It was shared online by Bachchan and Jackie Shroff. The trailer for the Tamil-dubbed version was launched by actors Sivakarthikeyan and Vijay Sethupathi, and the Kannada and Telugu-dubbed versions by Rishab Shetty and Nani respectively, on 15 and 16 December.

In early December, Mohanlal announced the Barroz Art Contest for fans to design posters and artworks based on the central character, in which winners would get a cash prize ranging from ₹25,000 to ₹1,00,000; the second prize winners would receive an exclusive autograph from Mohanlal, while grand prize winners would meet the actor and present the artwork. The same month, the Jain International School of Creative Arts and Manorama Online had announced an art competition for schoolchildren based on Barroz 3D. Limited for around thousand participants, they would have to draw their own interpretation of the film posters and trailer in this competition. It will be held at the Jain University in InfoPark Kochi, where Mohanlal would be felicitated as the chief guest, and winners would get a cash reward in first three prizes worth ₹3,00,000, presented by the actor on stage. Jain International School and Manorama Online, further announced a treasure hunt competition across Kerala, limited for 25 participants with no age restrictions and they would receive Barroz 3D T-shirts as incentives, while winners and participants would receive prizes worth ₹5,00,000, including cash prizes ranging from ₹4,000 to ₹10,000.

== Release ==
=== Theatrical ===
Barroz 3D was theatrically released on the occasion of Christmas (25 December 2024), in 3D format. Apart from its original Malayalam version, the film would be dubbed and released in Tamil, Telugu, Kannada, Hindi and English languages.

Initially, in September 2022, Mohanlal stated that the film is planned for a theatrical release within March 2023. But during the same period as the tentative release month, production designer Santhosh Raman told a media outlet that the makers are eyeing for an Onam release, but no official announcement followed. In August 2023, it was reported that the film would be released on 21 December 2023, coinciding with the Christmas weekend. Those plans were forfeited and Mohanlal's other film Neru released on that date. In November 2023, it was officially announced that the film would be theatrically released on 28 March 2024. However, due to the delay in the film's post-production, it was postponed further.

During the first quarter of 2024, it was then reported that the film would be released in May 2024 in order to avoid clashing with other Malayalam films releasing in the summer period (April–June), but that did not happen. Later on that May, Mohanlal officially announced that the film would be released on 12 September 2024, coinciding with the eve of Onam festival. But, a month before its scheduled release, it was postponed to 3 October, coinciding with Navaratri, before being delayed further citing incomplete post-production works. Its current release date was announced on 15 November, by director Fazil, who added that the release also coincided the same date as Mohanlal's debut film Manjil Virinja Pookkal (1980) and Manichitrathazhu's (1994) release.

The film's Hindi-dubbed version will be released two days after the original version, on 27 December, as the initial release clashed with Baby John.

=== Distribution ===
The film would be distributed across India by Aashirvad Release, whereas overseas distribution will be handled by Phars Film and Aashirvad Cinemas Co. LLP. The film's Hindi-dubbed version would be distributed by Pen Studios and Pen Marudhar Entertainment. The Tamil-dubbed version will be distributed by MSM Movie Traders, while Mythri Movie Makers handled the acquisition for the distribution rights in Andhra Pradesh and Telangana, and PVR INOX Pictures would distribute the film across Karnataka.

=== Home media ===
The film's digital distribution rights are acquired by Disney+ Hotstar and started streaming from 22 January 2025.

== Box office ==
The film grossed 6.55 crore in the opening day worldwide with ₹3.50 crore from Kerala. The film had a gross of ₹9.3 crore in 6 days from Kerala. It concluded its run with worldwide gross estimated to be ₹20 crore emerging as a box office disaster.

== Reception ==
=== Critical response ===
Princy Alexander of Onmanorama praised the performances of the lead actors, the computer graphics and cinematography, but felt the music was underutilized, and wrote that "Despite some of the flaws, Barroz is a welcome change at the theatres, which is currently ruled by action and violence-heavy movies." Sia Viju of Mathrubhumi wrote, "Mohanlal's bold foray into 3D filmmaking is a welcome departure from the traditional Malayalam cinema. By incorporating cutting-edge technology, he has managed to create a cinematic experience that rivals international productions in terms of scale and ambition."

Rohit Panikker of Times Now rated the film three out of five stars and wrote, "Temper your expectations and viewing the film as what it is intended to be - a light-hearted children's film that seeks to entertain family audiences at a time when blood, gore, and gunfights are ruling the screen - makes this a completely enjoyable watch sans its weary runtime and flat, predictable storyline." Arjun Ramachandran of The South First gave it three out of five stars and noted that "The first half of Barroz has a slow pace, but the second half picks up momentum with action sequences and other elements."

Ganesh Aaglave of Firstpost gave it two-and-a-half out of five stars and wrote, "The 3D effects look awesome. However, this visual brilliance motion is marred by the snail-paced screenplay and lacklustre story, which turn out to be the biggest drawbacks of Barroz 3D." Vivek Santhosh of The New Indian Express gave it two out of five stars and wrote, "Fantasy films for children are a rarity in Malayalam cinema, and Mohanlal deserves credit for attempting to fill this gap. Yet, Barroz is a reminder that ambition alone cannot make up for weak execution. The film dreams of being a priceless treasure, but in the end, it's little more than a shiny trinket, polished just enough to catch the light but not enough to hold our attention."

Janani K. of India Today gave it two out of five stars and wrote, "While the film is strong on the technical front, the story isn't captivating enough. The story is slow-paced and there's hardly anything happening to be stretched over two and a half hours." Ajay U. K. of The News Minute noted that "The ambition of Mohanlal's Barroz is appreciable, but it felt too forced in a film that came with high expectations."

A critic from The Hans India wrote, "Visually impressive but narratively weak, Barroz 3D is a mixed bag. Those who enjoy grand visuals and Mohanlal's performances may appreciate the effort, but a stronger script would have elevated the film to greater heights. Proceed with tempered expectations." Vishal Menon of The Hollywood Reporter India criticized the film for its failure to invest in emotional arcs, convoluted plot, and over-reliance on exposition, with the reviewer also criticizing the performances of the foreign actors, and noting that the film's prioritization of technology over storytelling makes it a disappointing experience that echoes Kochadaiiyaan (2014) rather than the classic My Dear Kuttichathan.

Kirubhakar Purushothaman of News18 wrote, "Director Mohanlal seems to be the problem with Barroz, which could have been the entertaining feel-good fantasy film it strives to be. He fails to execute this promising idea and has come up with a film where scenes are disjoint and lifeless." S. R. Praveen of The Hindu wrote, "Billed as a children's film, Barroz severely lacks in the storytelling department, which is too sluggish to engage any child. What might interest them are some of the decently pulled-off 3D sequences and visual effects which serve as little patches on an otherwise broken piece."

Anandu Suresh of The Indian Express gave it one out of five stars and wrote, "While the Mohanlal directorial might captivate infants who are just beginning to distinguish shapes and objects, expecting older children to be similarly enthralled by what Barroz has offered is unrealistic." Sajin Shrijith of The Week gave it one out of five stars and wrote, "Barroz has actors from India and abroad, everyone doing their best to irritate us with their jarringly terrible performances and dubbing, especially lead actor Maya Rao West."

== Accolades ==
Year	Award	Category	Winner(s)	Ref
2024	48th Kerala Film Critics Association Awards	Best Costume Design	Jyothi Madanani	
2024	48th Kerala Film Critics Association Awards	Best Makeup-Man	Gurpreeth Kaur; Bhoopalan Murali	
2024	Kalabhavan Mani Memorial Awards	Best Debutant Director	Mohanlal	
2024	55th Kerala State Film Awards	Best Dubbing Artist - Female	Sayanora Philip	
2024	55th Kerala State Film Awards	Best Dubbing Artist - Male	Bhasi Vaikom	
