= Manjil Virinja Pookkal =

1980 film directed by Fazil

Manjil Virinja Pookkal.
- Theatrical release poster
- Directed by: Fazil
- Written by: Fazil
- Produced by: Navodaya Appachan
- Starring: Shankar; Mohanlal; Poornima Bhagyaraj
- Cinematography: Ashok Kumar
- Edited by: T. R. Shekhar
- Music by: Songs: Jerry Amaldev; Score: Guna Singh
- Production company: Navodaya Studio
- Distributed by: Navodaya
- Release date: 25 December 1980
- Running time: 150 minutes
- Country: India
- Language: Malayalam
- Budget: ₹7 lakh (equivalent to ₹1.8 crore or US$190,000 in 2026)
- Box office: ₹1 crore (equivalent to ₹25 crore or US$2.7 million in 2026)

Manjil Virinja Pookkal (transl. Flowers that Blossomed in the Snow) is a 1980 Indian Malayalam-language romantic thriller film produced by Navodaya Appachan under Navodaya Studio and written and directed by Fazil (in his directorial debut). It stars Shankar, Mohanlal and Poornima Bhagyaraj. The film features original songs composed by Jerry Amaldev and a score by Guna Singh, cinematography was done by Ashok Kumar.

In the film, Prem Kishan (Shankar) arrives at Kodaikanal, where he falls in love with a girl named Prabha (Poornima). But Prabha is already married to Narendran (Mohanlal), a sadistic youngster. Their life gets troublesome when Narendran finds out about their affair. Manjil Virinja Pookkal marks the onscreen debut of Mohanlal and Poornima, the Malayalam debut of Shankar, the directorial debut of Fazil, and Amaldev's debut as music director.

The film was shot extensively in and around Kodaikanal, Tamil Nadu. Manjil Virinja Pookkal was released in theatres on 25 December 1980 on Christmas day. Made for ₹7 lakh (₹0.7 million), the film grossed over ₹1 crore (₹10 million) at the box office. It became one of the highest-grossing Malayalam films of all time. In retrospect, the film is often regarded as the first new generation film in Malayalam cinema. Manjil Virinja Pookkal won six Kerala State Film Awards, including Best Film with Popular Appeal and Aesthetic Value and Best Actress for Poornima.

== Plot ==
The story is about Prem Krishnan coming to the hills of Kodaikanal on work, meeting and falling in love with Prabha whom he knows little about. Later, he realises that she is married when her husband, Narendran comes into the picture. Narendran is a sadistic husband. The film ends with Prem Krishnan committing suicide by driving off the cliff after killing Narendran, saddened by the loss of Prabha, who was killed by Narendran.

== Cast ==
- Shankar as Prem Krishnan
- Mohanlal as Narendran
- Poornima Bhagyaraj as Prabha, Prem's Love interest and Narendran's ex-wife
- Prathapachandran as Shivashankara Panicker
- Alummoodan as Kushalan
- Nedumudi Venu as Seythalavi

== Production ==
=== Development ===
Fazil was one of the members in the creative team of Navodaya Studio's story discussions for their productions. The discussion for Manjil Virinja Pookkal began right after the success of the studio's big-budget film Theekkadal starring high-profile actors like Madhu and Prem Nazir. During their discussion, Fazil suggested a low-budget film featuring newcomers. The project was greenlit and they hired Fazil himself as the director. Ashok Kumar was selected as the film's cinematographer; his name was suggested by a friend of Fazil. Fazil got the film's title from a chat he had with song lyricist Bichu Thirumala when they were in Alappuzha. Thirumala when returned after a morning walk told Fazil that he saw a flower bloomed in the snow. Fazil found it to be against the laws of nature for flowers to bloom in the snow because that would prevent spring from coming. He realised that his main characters Prabha and Prem Kishan too suffer the same fate, because spring does not come to their lives, and their love cannot bloom.

=== Casting ===
Shankar was selected to portray Prem Kishan, the film was his debut in Malayalam cinema; he was already popular among the Tamil speaking audience through the film Oru Thalai Ragam (1980) which ran for 365 days in Tamil Nadu. For the role of Narendran, debutant Mohanlal was selected through an audition. A panel consisting Jijo Punnoose, Fazil, Sibi Malayil, and a director [unknown] was the judges for the screen-test. Sibi Malayil and the other director gave him only five and seven marks out of hundred displeased with his appearance, but Fazil and Punnoose awarded him 90 and 95 marks for his performance. He was ultimately chosen as the antagonist. Mohanlal donated his first salary of ₹2000 to an orphanage near the filming location. The film's second-unit director was Sibi Malayil. Poornima Jayaram made her debut in Malayalam with the film.

The studio hired the United States-based Jerry Amaldev as the music composer, who debuted with it. Amaldev was suggested to Fazil by Punnoose, Fazil recall that, "Jijo of Navodaya had made me listen to a song tuned by a new composer and I immediately liked its orchestration,...I had no idea who Jerry was, but was impressed when Jijo told me that he had assisted legendary composer Naushad in Mumbai. I decided to try him for my debut film, and that was how he became the music director of Manjil Virinja Pookkal".

=== Filming ===
On the thought that "a movie that introduces a new face should be shot using a new camera", Appachan travelled to Germany for buying the "best camera available" at that time. The film was shot using the Arriflex 35 IIC camera. The filming took place mainly in and around Kodaikanal, Tamil Nadu. The first dialogue of Mohanlal, which begins as "Good Evening Mrs. Prabha Narendran" was shot close to the Astoria Hotel, near Kodaikanal bus-stand.

== Soundtrack ==
Manjil Virinja Pookkal

Soundtrack album by Jerry Amaldev
- Released: 1 December 1980
- Recorded: 1980
- Length: 44:38
- Language: Malayalam
- Label: Saregama
- Producer: Navodaya Appachan

Jerry Amaldev chronology
Manjil Virinja Pookkal (1980)	Dhanya (1981)

The songs of this movie were composed by Jerry Amaldev and penned by Bichu Thirumala.

All lyrics are written by Bichu Thirumala.

No.	Title	Performer(s)	Length
1.	"Manjani Kombil (Original)"	S. Janaki	4:10
2.	"Mizhiyoram (Original)"	S. Janaki	4:23
3.	"Mizhiyoram (Original)"	K. J. Yesudas	4:18
4.	"Manjadi Kunnil (Original)"	K. J. Yesudas, Vani Jairam	4:01
5.	"Manjadi Kunnil Revival (Original)"	K. J. Yesudas, Vani Jairam	3:52
6.	"Mizhiyoram Revival (Original)"	K. J. Yesudas	4:18
7.	"Manjani Kombil Revival (Original)"	S. Janaki	3:56
8.	"Manjani Kombil (Original)"	K. J. Yesudas, Vani Jairam	3:15
9.	"Manjadi Kunnil (Original)"	K. J. Yesudas	4:10
10.	"Mizhiyoram Revival (Original)"	S. Janaki	4:08
11.	"Manjani Kombil (Original)"	S. Janaki	4:06
Total length:			44:38

The song Mizhiyoram was reused in the film Jan.E.Man.

== Reception ==
Manjil Virinja Pookkal was released on 25 December 1980, Christmas Day.

=== Critical response ===
On 26 December 1980, The Indian Express wrote, "The director, Sri Fazil, a post-graduate student who has also contributed to the story and dialogue makes an impressive debut in this picture. His directorial touches are original, and he shows a definitive touch that could be the envy of veteran directors."

=== Box office ===
The film was a slow starter but turned out to be a blockbuster and ran for more than 150 days in theatres. Made on a cost of ₹7 lakh (₹0.7 million), it grossed over ₹1 crore (₹10 million) at the box office, becoming one of the highest-grossing Malayalam films of the year. In an interview in 2010, Shankar told that he watched the film on its release day in a theatre in Thrissur, but "it didn't look like the film was going to be a hit then", and he was surprised by the response it got later. He realised the film was doing well from the comments of people when he was mobbed at the Bangalore Airport.

== Accolades ==
Award	Category	Nominee(s)	Result	Ref.
Kerala State Film Awards	Best Film with Popular Appeal and Aesthetic Value	Fazil, Navodaya Appachan	Won	
Kerala State Film Awards	Best Actress	Poornima Jayaram	Won	
Kerala State Film Awards	Best Music Director	Jerry Amaldev	Won	
Kerala State Film Awards	Best Play Back Singer	K. J. Yesudas	Won	
Kerala State Film Awards	Best Play Back Singer	S. Janaki	Won	
Kerala State Film Awards	Best Background Music	Gunasingh	Won	
Kerala Film Critics Association Awards	Best Film	Fazil, Navodaya Appachan	Won	
Kerala Film Critics Association Awards	Best Music Director	Jerry Amaldev	Won	
Kerala Film Critics Association Awards	Best Cinematographer	Ashok Kumar	Won	

== Legacy ==
Manjil Virinja Pookkal became a landmark film in Malayalam cinema. In retrospect, it is regarded as the first new generation film in Malayalam cinema. Shankar's symbolism before kissing, that is, moving his index finger from left chin to his upper lip and then downwards, was a rage among the youth. In the 2013 film Natholi Oru Cheriya Meenalla, throughout the film, Fahadh Faasil's character Prem interacts with the character Narendran in a virtual world. The song "Mizhiyoram" was reused in the 2021 film Jan.E.Man.
