= Thacholi Ambu =

1978 Indian film

- Poster
- Directed by: Navodaya Appachan
- Screenplay by: N. Govindan Kutty
- Based on: Vadakkan Pattukal
- Produced by: Navodaya Appachan
- Starring: Prem Nazir; Sivaji Ganesan; Jayan
- Cinematography: U. Rajagopal
- Edited by: T. R. Sekhar
- Music by: K. Raghavan
- Production company: Navodaya Studio
- Distributed by: Navodaya Release
- Release date: 27 October 1978
- Running time: 155 minutes
- Country: India
- Language: Malayalam
- Budget: ₹30 lakh
- Box office: ₹1 crore

Thacholi Ambu is a 1978 Indian Malayalam-language historical drama film directed and produced by Navodaya Appachan under Navodaya Studio. It was the first anamorphic CinemaScope film in Malayalam cinema. The film stars Prem Nazir in the title role, alongside Sivaji Ganesan, Ravikumar and Jayan. Made on a cost of ₹30 lakh, the film grossed more than ₹1 crore at the box office.

== Plot ==
Thacholi Ambu's uncle, the great warrior Thacholi Othenan speaks to him through an oracle to go to Ponniyam Parunthunkalkotta. Ambu befriends the poor ferryman Mayan Kutty and his grandson Kunjali and learns that Parunthunkalkotta Panicker had murdered his uncle and implicated Mayan Kutty's son Bappu as the assassin. Bappu and his family flees from the bloodthirsty mob. But as he saves his eldest son from a crocodile, the mob catches up with Bappu and kills him. The child is lost and the bereaved Mayan Kutty manages to pack the rest of the family to a safe shore.

Thacholi Ambu learns that he can't conquer the fort unless he recovers the magic amulet which his uncle Thacholi Othenan had left with his wife Kunjitheyi, the sister of Parunthunkalkotta Panicker. He disguises himself and makes his way to the Fort to participate in a Grand Festival along with Mayan Kutty and Kunjali. There he meets his aunt Kunjitheyi and cousin Kanni with whom he promptly falls in love.

Meanwhile, Mayan Kutty is stuck by how much Kutty, the army chief and younger son of Parunthunkalkotta Panicker resembles his own dead son Bappu. In fact, Kutty is Bappu's lost eldest son. By the time the truth is known Kutty had already declared a duel with Kunjali, his biological brother who had threatened his villainous adoptive elder brother Ithiri. Kutty is torn between his loyalty to his adoptive family and his biological family who have truth on their side. Ambu makes his way to the fort to save Kunjali from the duel. Kutty makes sure that the magical amulet reaches his aunt who will restore it to the rightful owner, Thacholi Ambu. A furious Mayan Kutty shoots Parunthunkalkotta Panicker with the same gun with which he had murdered Thacholi Othenan all those years ago.

== Cast ==
- Prem Nazir as Thacholi Ambu, Othenan's Nephew
- Sivaji Ganesan as Thacholi Othenakkurup
- Jayan as Bappu and Kutty (Bappu's Son)
- K. P. Ummer as Kathiroor Gurukkal
- Balan K. Nair as Mayan Kutty, Bappu's Father
- N. Govindan Kutty as Parunthunkalkotta Panicker, Othenan's Brother-in-law
- M. N. Nambiar as Ittiri, Parunthunkalkotta Panicker's eldest Son
- G. K. Pillai as Payyampalli Chanthu, Othenan's Friend
- Ravikumar as Kunjali, Bappu's other Son
- K. R. Vijaya as Kunjitheyi, Othenan's Wife
- Unnimary as Kanni, Othenan's Daughter
- Vijaya Lalitha
- Alummoodan
- Usilai Mani
- Ushakumari
- Meena as Ambu's mother and Othenan's sister

== Production ==
Thacholi Ambu is the first Malayalam film in CinemaScope. Sivaji Ganesan ventured to enact the film's action scenes without the use of a stunt double. During the filming of one such scene, he fell from a height of six feet. A shield fell on his hand and injured him severely, resulting in him being hospitalised for many days.

== Soundtrack ==
The music was composed by K. Raghavan and the lyrics were written by Yusufali Kechery.

Song	Singers
"Anuraagakkalariyil"	K. J. Yesudas
"Makaramaasa Pournamiyil"	P. Susheela, Chorus
"Naadapuram Palliyile"	Vani Jairam
"Naanam Kunungikale"	S. Janaki, P. Susheela
"Ponniyam Parunthunkal"	P. Susheela, Chorus
"Ponniyam Poonkanni"	P. Susheela
"Thacholi Veettile"	P. Susheela

== Reception ==
Kousigan of Kalki wrote the Kerala civilisation, tradition, hairstyling, costumes, palace, choreography, mode of war have been depicted realistically, adding that despite appearing only for a few scenes, Sivaji Ganesan delivered a memorable performance. The film performed well at the box office. Made on a cost of ₹30 lakh (₹3 million), the film grossed more than ₹1 crore (₹10 million).
