= Navodaya Appachan =

Indian film producer and entrepreneur

- Born: M. C. Punnoose; 11 January 1924; Pulinkunnoo, Alappuzha district, Kerala, India
- Died: 23 April 2012 (aged 88); Kochi, India
- Occupations: Film producer, film director
- Relatives: Jijo Punnoose (son); Kunchacko (brother); Boban Kunchacko (nephew); Kunchacko Boban (grand-nephew)
- Awards: J. C. Daniel Award (2010)

Maliampurackal Chacko Punnoose, known as Navodaya Appachan (11 January 1924 – 23 April 2012), was an Indian film producer, director, and entrepreneur. He was best known for his work in Malayalam cinema, especially as the founder of Navodaya Studio.

== Personal life ==
Appachan was born, as M. C. Punnoose to M. M. Chacko, son of Mani of the Maliampurackal family, at Pulinkunnoo, and was an alumnus of St. Xavier's College, Palayamkottai. His brother, Kunchacko established the first film studio in Kerala, Udaya Studios.

His nephew, Boban Kunchacko, was also an actor, director, and producer who was part of a few films produced by Udaya. His grandnephew, Kunchacko Boban is also a Malayalam film actor.

Appachan is married to Baby Punnoose and have two sons Jijo and Jose, and a daughter, Jiss Punnoose.

== Career ==
Appachan first became involved in the film industry with his brother Kunchacko, at Udaya Studio, and later founded of Navodaya Studio.

He produced Manjil Virinja Pookkal and My Dear Kuttichathan. The latter was, directed by his son, Jijo Punnoose and was the first 3D movie made in India and released as Chota Chetan in Hindi.

Appachan directed Thacholi Ambu, which was the first Cinemascope film in Malayalam. He also directed Padayottam, which was the first indigenously shot 70mm movie in South India, was produced by him. He created Bible Ki Kahaniyan on Doordarshan.

He founded Kishkinta, India's first theme park, in Chennai. He was given the 2011 J. C. Daniel Award for contributions to Malayalam cinema.

== Death ==
Appachan died of cancer aged 88 on 23 April 2012 at Lakeshore Hospital in Kochi.

== Filmography ==
Year	Title	Director	Producer	Notes
1978	Thacholi Ambu	Yes	Yes	
1978	Kadathanaattu Maakkam	Yes	Yes	
1979	Maamaankam	Yes	Yes	
1980	Manjil Virinja Pookkal		Yes	Debut of Mohanlal and debut of Jerry Amaldev as music director in films
1980	Theekkadal	Yes	Yes	
1982	Padayottam		Yes	First 70 mm film in India
1983	Ente Mamattikkuttiyammakku		Yes	
1984	My Dear Kuttichathan		Yes	India's first 3-D film.
1986	Onnu Muthal Poojaym Vare		Yes	Debut of Raghunath Paleri as director and debut of Geetu Mohandas
1989	Chanakyan		Yes	Debut of T.K. Rajeevkumar as director
1993	Bible ki Kahaaniyan (For TV)		Yes	Television series
2003	Magic Magic 3D		Yes	

== Awards ==
- He won Filmfare Award for Best Film - Malayalam - Chamaram (1980)
