= Onnu Muthal Poojyam Vare =

- Theatrical release poster
- Directed by: Reghunath Paleri
- Written by: Reghunath Paleri
- Produced by: Navodaya Appachan
- Starring: Asha Jayaram; Geetu Mohandas
- Cinematography: Shaji N. Karun
- Edited by: T. R. Shekhar
- Music by: Mohan Sithara
- Production company: Navodaya Studio
- Distributed by: Navodaya
- Release date: 20 October 1986
- Country: India
- Language: Malayalam

Onnu Muthal Poojyam Vare (transl. From One to Zero) is a 1986 Indian Malayalam-language drama film produced by Navodaya Appachan under Navodaya Studio, written and directed by Reghunath Paleri (in his directorial debut). The film features Asha Jayaram and Geetu Mohandas in lead roles. Mohanlal's voice-over appears throughout the film, but he turns up only at the end of the story. Suresh Gopi and Mukesh make cameo appearances.

The film explores the loneliness of a widow and the need for a father figure for her daughter. It won six Kerala State Film Awards for Best Debut Director (Reghunath Paleri), Best Child Artist (Geetu), Best Cinematography (Shaji N. Karun), Best Editor (Shekhar), Best Art Director, and Best Sound Recordist.

== Cast ==
- Asha Jayaram as Aleena
- Geetu Mohandas as Deepamol
- Nedumudi Venu as Dr. K. K. Menon
- Sukumari as Sister
- Shari as Elizabeth, Aleena's friend
- Prathap Pothan as Josekutty, Aleena's late husband
- Zainuddin as the Santa Claus
- Kalabhavan Rahman as the ice cream parlour waiter
- Suresh Gopi as the man at the beach (Cameo appearance)
- Poornima Indrajith as Deepamol's classmate
- Mukesh as the man at the ice cream parlour (Cameo appearance)
- Mohanlal as Telephone uncle (Cameo appearance)

== Production ==
Geetu Mohandas who was barely four years old made her acting debut as a child artist with this film. In order to make her perform to the character, the film's director, Paleri, used to converse with her through telephone as Mohanlal's character to get her familiarize with the character.

== Soundtrack ==
All lyrics are written by O. N. V. Kurup; all music is composed by Mohan Sithara.

Track listing
No.	Title	Artist(s)	Length
1.	"Ponnoleevin" (Malarppanthalpolaam)	G. Venugopal, Choir
2.	"Ponnum Thinkal"	K. S. Chithra
3.	"Ponnum Thinkal Pottum Maane" (Male)	G. Venugopal
4.	"Raaree Raareeram"	K. S. Chithra, G. Venugopal

== Awards ==
Award	Category	Nominee(s)	Result	Ref.
Kerala State Film Award	Best Debut Director	Raghunath Paleri	Won	
Kerala State Film Award	Best Child Artist	Geetu Mohandas	Won	
Kerala State Film Award	Best Cinematography	Shaji N. Karun	Won	
Kerala State Film Award	Best Editor	T. R. Sekhar	Won	
Kerala State Film Award	Best Art Director	K. Sheker	Won	
Kerala State Film Award	Best Sound Recordist	Selvaraj	Won	
Kerala Film Critics Association Awards	Best Cinematographer	Shaji N. Karun	Won	
Kerala Film Critics Association Awards	Best Debutant	Raghunath Paleri	Won	
