= T. R. Sekhar =

Malayalam film editor

T. R. Sekhar (1937 – 22 March 2018) is a Malayalam film editor. He edited more than 58 films and most of his films are very celebrated. He died on 21 March 2018 at Trichi.

== Film career ==
He started his career in 1969 as associate editor under G. Venkittaraman in the film Nadhi. In 1971 he started his editing career in the film Lora Neeyevide. His last film was the third edition of My Dear Kuttichathan in 2011. He worked with the famous directors of Malayalam industry like Fazil and Siddique-Lal in their films. The first 70 mm film in Malayalam Padayottam the first 3D movie My Dear Kuttichathan are edited by him.
