= Malayalam cinema =

Branch of Indian cinema

- No. of screens: 777 screens in Kerala state of India (2024)
- Main distributors: Aashirvad Cinemas; Amal Neerad Productions; Anto Joseph Film Company; Anwar Rasheed Entertainments; Ashiq Usman Productions; August Cinema; AVA Productions; Bhavana Studios; E4 Entertainment; Fahadh Faasil and Friends; Friday Film House; Kavya Film Company; Lal Creations; LJ Films; Magic Frames; Mammootty Kampany; Merryland Studio; Mulakuppadam Films; Navodaya Studio; OPM Cinemas; Pauly Jr. Pictures; Prithviraj Productions; Revathy Kalamandhir; Sree Gokulam Movies; Swargachitra; Grand Production; Udaya Pictures; Wayfarer Films; Weekend Blockbusters; Working Class Hero

Produced feature films (2023)
- Total: 259

Malayalam cinema, also referred to as Mollywood, is a segment of Indian cinema dedicated to producing films in the Malayalam language, primarily spoken in Kerala and the Lakshadweep islands. It is the fourth biggest film industry in India considering yearly revenue and box office terms.It encompasses both the mainstream film industry and independent Malayalam films. Known for its strong storytelling, powerful performances, and social themes, Malayalam cinema has received critical acclaim and is often regarded as one of India's most notable film industries.

The first Malayalam feature film was Vigathakumaran, a silent film directed and produced by J. C. Daniel. Production started in 1928, and it was released at the Capitol Theatre in Thiruvananthapuram on 23 October 1930. The first talkie in Malayalam was Balan (1938) directed by S. Nottani. During the 1920s, the Malayalam film industry was based in Thiruvananthapuram, although the film industry started to develop and flourish by the late 1940s. Later the industry shifted to Madras (now Chennai). By the late 1980s, the industry returned to Kerala, establishing Kochi as its hub with most production and post-production facilities located there and most of the film stars including Mammootty and Mohanlal living in the city.

As of 2024, Malayalam cinema has earned numerous accolades at the National Film Awards, including 14 for Best Actor, 6 for Best Actress, 13 for Best Film, and 13 for Best Director. Malayalam cinema garnered international recognition, with Elippathayam (1982) winning the Sutherland Trophy at the London Film Festival, and being named the Most Original Imaginative Film of 1982 by the British Film Institute. Additionally, Marana Simhasanam won the prestigious Caméra d'Or at the 1999 Cannes Film Festival.

Several Malayalam films have been India's official entries for the Best Foreign Language Film category at the Academy Awards, including Rajiv Anchal's Guru (1997), Salim Ahamed's Adaminte Makan Abu (2011), Lijo Jose Pellissery's Jallikkattu (2019) and Jude Anthany Joseph's 2018 (2023). Other globally acclaimed films include Chemmeen (1965), which received a Certificate of Merit at the Chicago International Film Festival, and a gold medal at the Cannes Film Festival for Best Cinematography. Swaham (1994) won the Bronze Rosa Camuna at the Bergamo Film Meeting in Italy. Malayalam cinema has also produced India's first 3D film, My Dear Kuttichathan (1984). The first CinemaScope film produced in Malayalam was Thacholi Ambu (1978).

== History ==
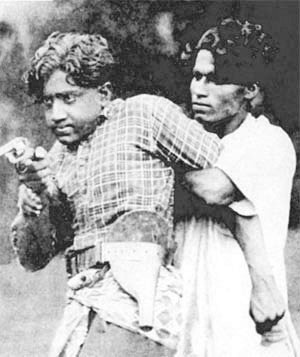
A scene from Vigathakumaran, the first Malayalam feature film

Active Malayalam film production did not take place until the second half of the 20th century: there were only two silent films, and three Malayalam-language films before 1947. With support from the Kerala state government production climbed from around 6 a year in the 1950s, to 30 a year in the 1960s, 40 a year in the 1970s, to 127 films in 1980.

=== Origins 1928 ===
The first cinema hall in Kerala, with a manually operated film projector, was opened in Thrissur by Jose Kattookkaran in 1907. In 1913, the first permanent theatre in Kerala was established in Thrissur town by Kattookkaran and was called the Jose Electrical Bioscope, now Jos Theatre.

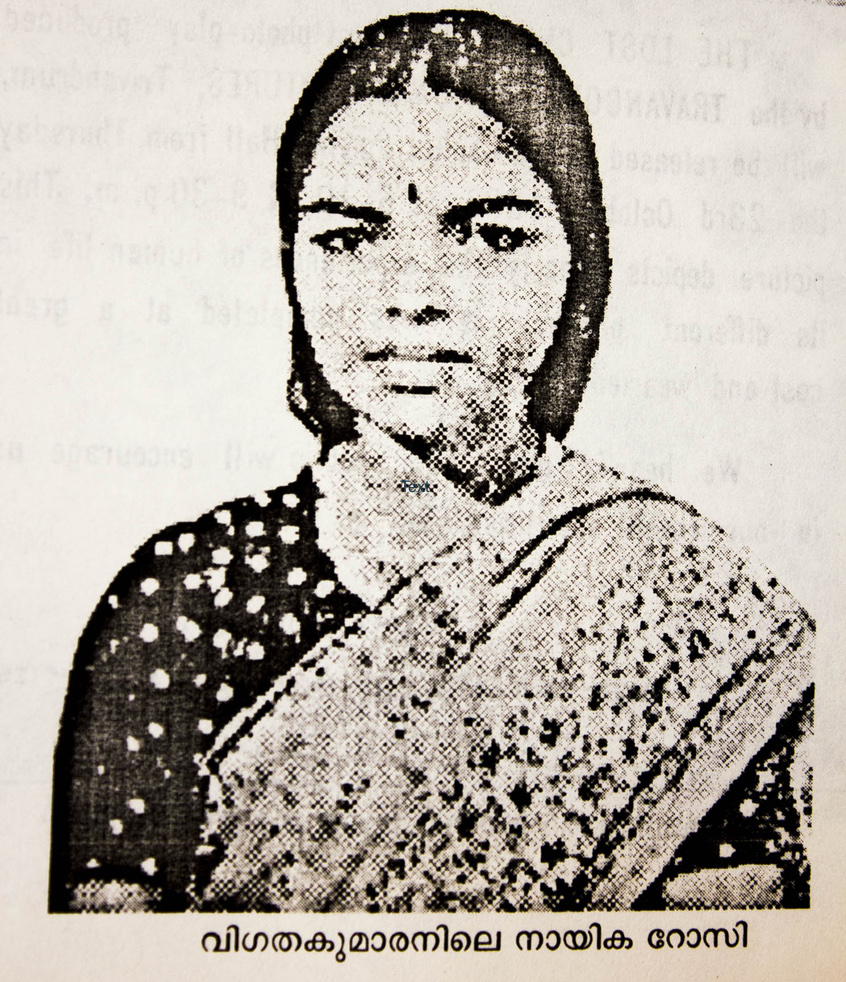
PK Rosy, the first actress of Malayalam movie industry

The first film made in Malayalam was Vigathakumaran. Production started in 1928, and it was released at the Capitol Theatre in Thiruvananthapuram on 23 October 1930. It was produced and directed by J. C. Daniel, a businessman with no prior film experience, who is credited as the father of Malayalam cinema. Daniel founded the first film studio, The Travancore National Pictures Limited, in Kerala. A second film, Marthanda Varma, based on the novel by C. V. Raman Pillai, was produced by R. Sundar Raj Nadar in 1933. However, after only being shown for four days, the film prints were confiscated due to a legal battle over copyright.

The first talkie in Malayalam was Balan, released in 1938. It was directed by S. Nottani with a screenplay and songs written by Muthukulam Raghavan Pillai. It was produced by Modern Theatres at Salem in the neighbouring state of Tamil Nadu. Balan was followed by Gnanambika in 1940, which was directed by S. Nottani. Then came Prahlada in 1941, directed by K. Subramoniam of Madras and featuring Guru Gopinath and Thankamani Gopinath.

Until 1947 most Malayalam films were made by Tamil producers, P. J. Cherian was the first Malayali producer to venture into this field after JC Daniel Nadar. PJ Cherian produced Nirmala in 1948 with Joseph Cherian and Baby Joseph his son and daughter-in-law as hero and heroine. He also cast many other family members in other roles, trying to break the taboo that noble family people do not take up acting. Nirmala is the first movie which introduced play-back singing in the Malayalm film industry . P.J. Cherian introduced play-back singing in Malayalam cinema. The lyrics of the film written by G. Sankara Kurup became popular.

Udaya Studios' Vellinakshatram (1949) was the first movie with audio to be made completely in Kerala.

=== 1950s ===
Malayalam cinema has always taken its themes from relevant social issues and has been interwoven with material from literature, drama, and politics since its inception. One such film, Jeevitha Nouka (1951), was a musical drama that spoke about the problems in a joint family.

In 1954, the film Neelakuyil captured national interest by winning the President's silver medal. It was scripted by the well-known Malayalam novelist Uroob, and directed by P. Bhaskaran and Ramu Kariat.

Newspaper Boy (1955) contained elements of Italian neorealism. This film is notable as the product of a group of amateur college filmmakers. It told the story of a printing press employee and his family being stricken with extreme poverty.

The music took a turn away from the trend of copying Tamil and Hindi songs. The poets Tirunainaarkurichy Madhavan Nair – Thirunaiyarkurichy, P. Bhaskaran, O. N. V. Kurup, and Vayalar Ramavarma rose up in this period as film lyricists. Brother Lakshmanan, Dakshinamurthy, K. Raghavan, G. Devarajan, M. S. Baburaj, and Pukhenthey Velappan Nair started a distinct style of Malayalam music. Kamukara Purushotaman, Mehboob, Kozhikode Abdul Kader, AM Raja, P. B. Sreenivas, K. P. Udayabhanu, Santha P. Nair, P. Leela, S. Janaki, P. Susheela, B. Vasantha, Renuka, and Jikki were the most prominent singers of the 1950s. The drama artist and school teacher Muthukulam Raghavan Pillai lent many of his skills to the cinema in this period.

=== 1960s ===
Ramu Kariat, one of the directors of Neelakuyil (along with P. Bhaskaran), went on to become a successful director in the 1960s and 1970s. P. Bhaskaran directed many acclaimed and hit films in the 1960s and 70s. The cameraman of Neelakkuyil, A. Vincent, also became a noted director of the 1960s and 1970s. Notable films of this decade include Odayil Ninnu, Bhargavi Nilayam (1964), Chemmeen (1965), Murappennu (1965) and Iruttinte Athmavu (1966).

Malayalam cinema's first colour film was Kandam Bacha Coat (1961).

Chemmeen (1965), directed by Ramu Kariat and based on a novel of the same name by Thakazhi Sivasankara Pillai, went on to become very popular and became the first South Indian film to win the National Film Award for Best Feature Film.

Most of the films of the 1960s were animated by the nationalist and socialist projects and centered on issues relating to caste and class exploitation, the fight against obscurantist beliefs, the degeneration of the feudal class, and the break-up of the joint-family system.

In the 1960s, M. Krishnan Nair, Kunchacko and P. Subramaniam were the leading Malayali producers. Thikkurusi Sukumaran Nair, Prem Nazir, Sathyan, Madhu, Adoor Bhasi, Bahadur, S.P. Pillai, K.P. Ummer, Kottarakara Sreedharan Nair, Raghavan, G.K. Pillai, Muthukulam, Joseprakash, Paravur Bharatan, Muthayya, Shankaradi, Govindankutty, K.R. Vijaya, Padmini, Ragini, Sharada, Sheela, Ambika, Jayabharathi, Arumula Ponnamma and Sadahna were among the more popular actors active in this period.

During the 1950s, 1960s and 1970s, Kunchacko made significant contributions to Malayalam cinema, both as a producer and as director of some notable movies. He started Udaya Studios in Alappuzha in 1947, reducing the travel to Madras (Chennai) for film crew and actors. This boosted Malayalam film production in Kerala.

Many directors sprang up in this period. P.N. Menon made Rosy and later Chemparanthi. G. Aravindan and Adoor Gopalakrishnan also started work in the 1960s and became famous later.

=== 1970s ===
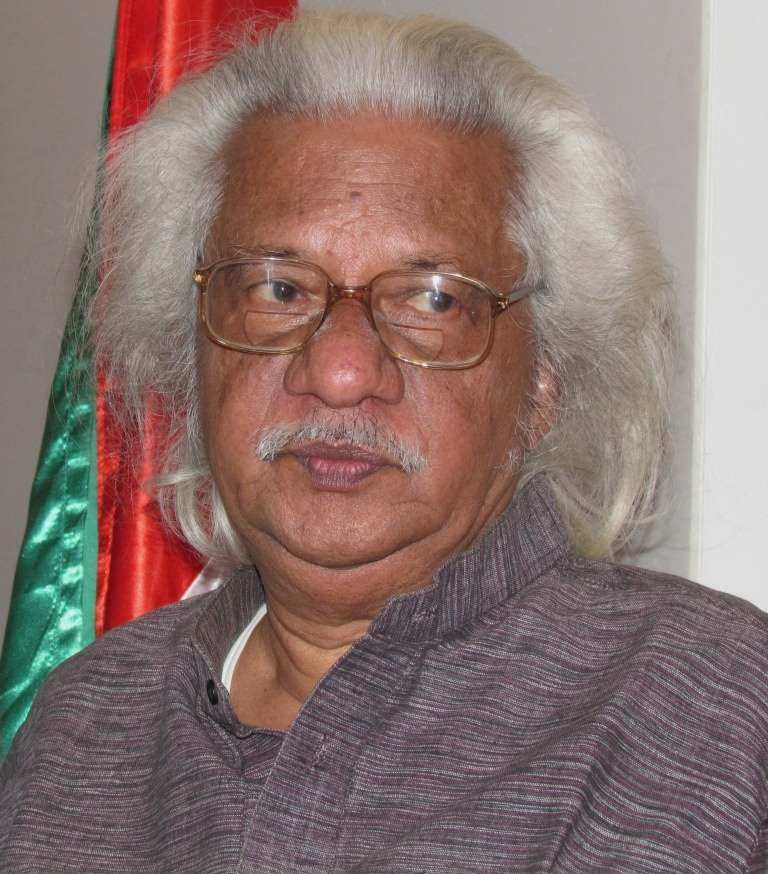
Adoor Gopalakrishnan is one of the pioneers of Indian parallel cinema.

The 70s saw the emergence of a new wave of cinema in Malayalam. The growth of the film society movement in Kerala introduced the works of the French and Italian New Wave directors to the discerning Malayali film enthusiasts. Adoor Gopalakrishnan's first film, Swayamvaram (1972), brought Malayalam cinema to the international film arena. In 1973 M. T. Vasudevan Nair, who was by then recognised as an important author in Malayalam, directed his first film, Nirmalyam, which won the National Film Award for Best Feature Film. G. Aravindan followed Adoor's lead with his Uttarayanam in 1974. K. P. Kumaran's Adhithi (1974) was another film that was acclaimed by the critics. Cinematographers who won the National Award for their work on Malayalam films in the 1970s were Mankada Ravi Varma for Swayamvaram (1972), P. S. Nivas for Mohiniyattam (1977), and Shaji N. Karun for Piravi (1989). John Abraham, K. R. Mohanan, K. G. George, and G. S. Panikkar were products of the Pune Film Institute who made significant contributions.

During the late 1970s, some young artists started seeing Malayalam cinema as a medium of expression and thought of it as a tool to revitalise society. A noted director, Aravindan, was famous in Kerala as a cartoonist before he started making films. His important movies include Kanchana Sita (1977), Thampu (1978), Kummatty (1979), Chidambaram (1985), Oridathu (1986), and Vasthuhara (1990).

The 1970s also saw the emergence of the notable director P. G. Viswambharan with his debut film Ozhukinethire and the mythical film Satyavan Savithri, which were well accepted.

Also, commercial cinema in this period saw several worker-class themed films which mostly had M. G. Soman, Sukumaran and Sudheer in the lead followed by the emergence of a new genre of pure action-themed films, in a movement led by Jayan. However, this was short-lived, and almost ended when Jayan died while performing a stunt in Kolilakkam (1980).

=== 1980s ===
The Malayalam cinema of this period was characterised by detailed screenplays dealing with everyday life with a lucid narration of plot intermingling with humour and melancholy. This was aided by the cinematography and lighting. The films had warm background music.

In 1981 Fazil directed Manjil Virinja Pookal the film also introduced then romantic star Shankar and later actor Mohanlal to the world. Adoor Gopalakrishnan made Elippathayam in 1981. This movie won the British Film Institute award. The year 1981 also saw the rise of actor Mammootty through the movie Sphodanam directed by P. G. Viswambharan.

In the 1980s Padmarajan made some of the landmark motion pictures in Malayalam cinema, including masterpieces like Oridathoru Phayalvaan (1981), Koodevide (1983), Thinkalaazhcha Nalla Divasam (1985), Arappatta Kettiya Gramathil (1986), Namukku Parkkan Munthirithoppukal (1986), Thoovanathumbikal (1987), Moonnam Pakkam (1988), Innale (1989) and Season (1989). He wrote several short stories that were unique in content and presentation. His novels handled the darkest emotions and considered as classics. Most plots were nascent for that age literature. All works were so cinematic and can be easily visualised to the celluloid version.

K. G. George released films including Yavanika and Adaminte Vaariyellu. This was the period during which script writer M. T. Vasudevan Nair started teaming up with director Hariharan to produce works like Panchagni, Nakhakshathangal, Aranyakam and Oru Vadakkan Veeragatha. John Abraham's films such as Amma Ariyaan addressed people's issues and raised the finance directly from people. The period had movies with humour from directors like Priyadarshan, Sathyan Anthikad, Kamal and Siddique-Lal. Piravi (1989) by Shaji N. Karun was the first Malayalam film to win the Caméra d'Or-Mention at the Cannes Film Festival.

Ratheesh and Sukumaran also were leading stars in the industry in the early eighties. By the end of the 1980s, Mammooty and Mohanlal also established themselves as the leading actors in Malayalam.

The mid-1980s saw the emergence of low-quality Malayalam softcore films made with fairly low budgets. They were remarked as B-grade films, and were certified as fit for adults only (A rated). These films emerged parallel with the mainstream Malayalam cinema. In 1986, roughly 14 of the 32-odd films released were classified as B-grade films.

=== 1990s ===
Some examples are Mathilukal (1990) directed by Adoor Gopalakrishnan, Kattukuthira (1990) directed by P. G. Viswambharan, Amaram (1991) directed by Bharathan, Ulladakkam (1992) directed by Kamal, Kilukkam (1991) directed by Priyadarshan, Kamaladalam (1992) by Sibi Malayil, Vidheyan (1993) by Adoor Gopalakrishnan, Devaasuram (1993) by I. V. Sasi, Manichitrathazhu (1993) by Fazil, Ponthan Mada (1993) by T. V. Chandran, Spadikam (1995) by Bhadran, Commissioner(1994) The King (1995) by Shaji Kailas, Hitler (1996) by Siddique and Desadanam (1997) by Jayaraj. Due to a series of comedy films produced between the late 1980s and late 1990s made actors like Jagadish, Siddique, Mukesh, Sreenivasan and Jayaram became very popular for their comedy roles. This series of comedy films begun in the late 1980s and early 1990s, with comedy films by Sathyan Anthikad and Siddique-Lal, like Ponmuttayidunna Tharavu, Mazhavilkavadi, Ramji Rao Speaking, Thalayana Manthram, In Harihar Nagar, and Godfather, and some of them went on to be remade by other directors in Tamil, Hindi, Telugu, and other languages. The success of In Harihar Nagar led to the production of a series of comedy films in the early and mid-1990s.

Swaham (1994), directed by Shaji N. Karun, was the first Malayalam film entry for the competition in the Cannes International Film Festival, where it was a nominee for the Palme d'Or. Murali Nair's Marana Simhasanam later won the Caméra d'Or at the 1999 Cannes Film Festival. Guru (1997), directed by Rajiv Anchal, was chosen as India's official entry to the Oscars to be considered for nomination in the Best Foreign Film category for that year, making it the first film in Malayalam to be chosen for Oscar nomination. Noted script writer A.K. Lohithadas made his directorial debut with Bhoothakkannadi, for which he won the Indira Gandhi Award for Best Debut Film of a Director.

=== 2000s ===
The millennium started with a blockbuster hit Narasimham starring Mohanlal . In 2001 came the world's first film with only one actor in the cast, The Guard. Slapstick comedy was the predominant theme of the films of this era and actor Dileep was the king of comedy. C.I.D. Moosa (2003) by Johny Antony, Meesa Madhavan (2002) by Lal Jose and Kunjikoonan (2002) directed by Sasi Shanker are examples. Sequels to a number of successful films were made. Some movies were examples of exemplary film making, such as Meghamalhar, Madhuranombarakattu, Nandanam, Perumazhakkalam, and Kaazhcha. In 2008, Malayalam movie artists came together in the ensemble-cast film Twenty:20 to raise funds for AMMA, the governing body of movie actors in Malayalam.

The 2000-2003 period also saw witnessed the Shakeela tharangam that resulted in the production of a series of low budget softporn films in Malayalam cinema. The continued failure of comedy films and the theater strikes in Kerala, that started in the early 2000s, were the major reasons behind the comeback of B-grade films in Malayalam. Around 57 of the total 89 films released in 2001 belonged to the soft-porn category and Shakeela featured in many of them.

=== 2010s ===
After several years of quality deterioration, Malayalam films saw the signs of massive resurgence after 2010 with the release of several experimental films (known as New Wave or New Generation films), mostly from new directors. New Wave is characterised by fresh and unusual themes and new narrative techniques. These films differ from conventional themes of the 1990s and 2000s and have introduced several new trends to the Malayalam industry. While the new generation's formats and styles are deeply influenced by global and Indian trends, their themes are firmly rooted in Malayali life and mindscapes. The new generation also helped the Malayalam film industry regain its past glory.

Salim Ahamed's Adaminte Makan Abu was chosen as India's official entry to the Academy Awards to be considered for nomination in the Best Foreign Film category in 2011.

Christian Brothers (2011) was released worldwide with a total of 310 prints on 18 March; it went to 154 centres in Kerala, 90 centres outside Kerala and 80 centres overseas, making it the widest release for a Malayalam film at that time. This record was later broken by Peruchazhi (2014), which released in 500 screens worldwide on 29 August. Drishyam (2013) became the first Malayalam film to cross the INR 500 million mark at the box office. The film was critically acclaimed and was remade in four languages. Later, in 2016, Pulimurugan directed by Vyshak became the first Malayalam film to cross the INR 1 billion mark at the box office.

In recent years, Malayalam films have gained popularity in Sri Lanka, with fans citing cultural similarities between Sinhalese people and Malayalis as a reason. In 2019, Lucifer became the highest grossing Malayalam film of all time. Lucifer became the highest grossing Indian film in Dubai. The film collected a final gross of INR 2000 million at the box office.

=== 2020s ===
In November 2020, Lijo Jose Pellissery's film Jallikattu was selected as India's submission for Oscar for best foreign language film making as third Malayalam film as entry. In 2020 a mid the COVID-19 lockdown, Sufiyum Sujatayum, starring Jayasurya and Aditi Rao Hydari, has become the first Malayalam film to be released on the Amazon Prime Video (OTT) platform as theatres remain shut in Kerala due to the pandemic. In 2021, Drishyam 2, Nayattu, Kala, Joji, The Great Indian Kitchen and Malik made their list in the highest rated 2021 movies in Imdb.

Malayalam cinema's first ever original superhero Minnal Murali was released through Netflix on 24 December 2021. Tovino Thomas as Minnal Murali which was directed by Basil Joseph under Weekend Blockbusters gained great reviews by critics and became top watched Non-English movie on Netflix. It broke all records of Malayalam cinema trailers on YouTube crossing 6 Million Views and 500K+ likes in 24 hours. in 2023, disaster film 2018 was selected as India's submission for Oscar for best international film

Malayalam cinema enjoyed unprecedented box office success in early months of 2024, with worldwide box office collection of Malayalam films touching ₹900 crores in the first quarter. Malayalam cinema achieved its first calendar year ₹1000 crore worldwide gross by May. As of 24 May, total worldwide box office gross stood at ₹1030 crores, including ₹660 crores from India and ₹370 from overseas. The films that led the success story were Manjummel Boys, Aadujeevitham, Premalu, Aavesham, Marco and ARM, all of which earned over ₹100 crores at worldwide box office. The success is attributed to wide critical acclaim, themes that resonated with the audience and tapping into other state markets.

In 2025, L2: Empuraan became the first Malayalam film to cross ₹250 and ₹300 crores mark, first Malayalam film to cross ₹50 crore opening day, first Malayalam film to cross ₹150 crore opening weekend and first Malayalam film to cross ₹150 crores in overseas markets. Then, Thudarum became the first Malayalam film to gross ₹100 crores from Kerala box office alone. This have made Malayalam cinema to gross over ₹800 crores totally in the first half of 2025, with L2: Empuraan and Thudarum being its backbone. Marco is the first Malayalam film set to be released in South Korea.

== Pioneering film-making techniques ==
- Newspaper Boy (1955), a neorealistic film, was inspired by Italian neorealism.
- Padayottam (1982) is India's first indigenously produced 70 mm film.
- My Dear Kuttichathan (1984) is India's first 3D film.
- O' Faby (1993) is India's first Live action/animation hybrid film.
- Amma Ariyan (1986) is the first Indian film to be funded through public contributions. It was produced by Odessa Collective, founded by the director John Abraham and friends. The money was raised by collecting donations and screening Charlie Chaplin's film The Kid.
- Kaalapani (1996) is the first Malayalam film to feature Dolby Stereo sound.
- Indraprastham (1996) is the first Malayalam film to feature Dolby Digital sound.
- Moonnamathoral (2006) is the first Indian film to be shot and distributed in digital format.
- Villain (2017) is the first Indian film to be shot entirely in 8K resolution.
- Vazhiye (2022) is the first found footage film in Malayalam cinema.
- L2: Empuraan (2025) is the first Malayalam film to be released in IMAX and EPIQ formats.

== Notable personalities ==
=== Directors ===
Malayalam cinema's directors have included J. C. Daniel, the director and producer of the first Malayalam film, Vigathakumaran (1928). Unlike other Indian films at that time, most of them were based on the Puranas, he chose to base his film on a social theme. Though it failed commercially, he paved the way for the Malayalam film industry and is widely considered the "father of Malayalam cinema". Until the 1950s, Malayalam film didn't see many talented film directors. The milestone film Neelakuyil (1954), directed by Ramu Kariat and P. Bhaskaran, shed a lot of limelight over its directors. Ramu Kariat went on to become a celebrated director in the 1960s and 1970s. P. Bhaskaran directed a few acclaimed films in the 1960s. The cameraman of Neelakuyil, A. Vincent, also became a noted director of the 1960s and 1970s. Another noted director of the 1950s was P. Ramadas, the director of the neorealistic film Newspaper Boy (1955).

In the 1970s, the Malayalam film industry saw the rise of film societies. It triggered a new genre of films known as "parallel cinema". The main driving forces of the movement, who gave priority to serious cinema, were Adoor Gopalakrishnan and G. Aravindan. People like John Abraham and P. A. Backer gave a new dimension to Malayalam cinema through their political themes. The late 1970s witnessed the emergence of another stream of Malayalam films, known as "middle-stream cinema", which seamlessly integrated the seriousness of the parallel cinema and the popularity of the mainstream cinema. Most of the films belonging to this stream were directed by PN Menon, I. V. Sasi, P. G. Viswambharan, K. G. George, Bharathan and Padmarajan.

Out of the 40 National Film Award for Best Direction given away till 2007, Malayalam directors have received 12. The directors who have won include Adoor Gopalakrishnan (1973, 1985, 1988, 1990, 2007), G. Aravindan (1978, 1979, 1987), Shaji N. Karun (1989), T. V. Chandran (1994), Jayaraj (1998, 2017) and Rajivnath (1999). There are several recipients of the Special Jury Award as well: Mankada Ravi Varma (1984), John Abraham (1987), Shaji N. Karun (1995) and Pradeep Nair (2005).

== Film music ==
Film score, which refers to Playback singer in the context of Indian music, forms the most important canon of popular music in India. The film music of Kerala in particular is the most popular form of music in the state. Before Malayalam cinema and Malayalam film music developed, the Malayali eagerly followed Tamil and Hindi film songs, and that habit has stayed with them until now. The history of Malayalam film songs begins with the 1948 film Nirmala which was produced by artist P. J. Cherian who introduced play-back singing for the first time in the film. The film's music composer was P. S. Divakar, and the songs were sung by P. Leela, T. K. Govindarao, Vasudeva Kurup, C. K. Raghavan, Sarojini Menon and Vimala B. Varma, who is credited as the first playback singer of Malayalam cinema.

The main trend in the early years was to use the tune of hit Hindi or Tamil songs in Malayalam songs. This trend changed in the early 1950s with the arrival of a number of poets and musicians to the Malayalam music scene. By the middle of the 1950s, the Malayalam film music industry started finding its own identity. This reformation was led by the music directors Brother Laxmanan, G. Devarajan, V. Dakshinamoorthy, M. S. Baburaj and K. Raghavan along with the lyricists Vayalar Ramavarma, P. Bhaskaran, O. N. V. Kurup and Sreekumaran Thampi. Major playback singers of that time were Kamukara Purushothaman, K. P. Udayabhanu, A. M. Rajah, P. Leela, Santha P. Nair, Ayiroor Sadasivan, Lalitha Thampi, C. S. Radhadevi, A. K. Sukumaran, B. Vasantha, P. Susheela, P. Madhuri and S. Janaki. Despite that, these singers got high popularity throughout Kerala and were part of the Golden age of Malayalam music (1960 to 1970).

In the later years many non-Malayalis like Manna Dey, Talat Mahmood, Lata Mangeshkar, Asha Bhosle, Hemlata, Kishore Kumar, Mahendra Kapoor and S. P. Balasubrahmanyam sang for Malayalam films. This trend was also found among composers to an extent, with film composers from other languages including Naushad, Usha Khanna, M. B. Sreenivasan, Ravi, Shyam, Bappi Lahiri, Laxmikant–Pyarelal, Salil Chowdhury, Ilaiyaraaja, Vishal Bhardwaj and A. R. Rahman scoring music for Malayalam films. This can be attributed to the fact that film music in South India had a parallel growth pattern with many instances of cross-industry contributions. The late 1950s through the mid-1970s can be considered as the golden period of Malayalam film music in its own identity. Along with the leading music directors, the likes of M. B. Sreenivasan, M. K. Arjunan, Pukezhenty Vellappan Nair, M. S. Viswanathan, A. T. Ummer, R. K. Shekhar, Salil Chowdhury and lyricists like Thirunainar Kurichi Madhavan Nair, Mankombu Gopalakrishnan and Bharanikkavu Sivakumar, numerous everlasting and hit songs were delivered to the music lovers. The soft melodious music and high quality lyrics were the highlights of these songs.

K. J. Yesudas, who debuted in 1961, virtually revolutionised the Malayalam film music industry and became the most popular Malayalam singer ever along with K. S. Chithra. The trio of Vayalar, G. Devarajan and Yesudas also made unforgettable songs like the earlier trio of Kamukara, Tirunainaarkurichy and Brother Laxmanan. Yesudas became equally popular with classical music audience and people who patronised film music. He along with P. Jayachandran gave a major face-lift to Malayalam playback singing in the 1960s and 1970s. K. S. Chithra debuted in 1979, and by the mid-eighties, she became the most sought after female singer in South India.

By the late 1970s, the trends in music started changing and more rhythm oriented songs with a western touch came with the dominance of music directors like Shyam, K. J. Joy, and Jerry Amaldev. The lyricists were forced to write lyrics according to the tune in these days and were often criticised for quality issues. However, from 1979 to 1980, the revolutionary music director Raveendran along with Johnson and M. G. Radhakrishnan led the second reformation of Malayalam film music by creating melodious and classical oriented music with the soul of the culture of Kerala. Lyricists like Poovachal Khader, Kavalam Narayana Panicker and Bichu Thirumala in the 1980s and Kaithapram Damodaran Namboothiri, V. Madhusoodanan Nair and Girish Puthenchery in the 1990s were part of this musical success. Contributions from Kannur Rajan, Ravi, S. P. Venkatesh, Mohan Sithara, Ouseppachan, Sharath, Vidyadharan, Raghukumar and Vidyasagar were also notable in this period. K. J. Yesudas and K. S. Chithra and singers like M. G. Sreekumar, G. Venugopal, Radhika Thilak, Unni Menon and Sujatha Mohan were also active then. A notable aspect in the later years was the extensive of classical carnatic music in many film songs of the 1980s and 1990s. Classical Carnatic music was heavily used in films like Chithram (1988), His Highness Abdullah (1990), Bharatham (1991), Sargam (1992), Kudumbasametham (1992), Sopanam (1993) etc.

At present, the major players in the scene are composers like A. R. Rahman, M. Jayachandran, Bijibal, Deepak Dev, Rex Vijayan, Jakes Bejoy, Rahul Raj, Prashant Pillai, Shaan Rahman, Sushin Shyam, Gopi Sundar, Alphons Joseph, Rajesh Murugesan, Jassie Gift, Shahabaz Aman, Vishnu Vijay, lyricists Rafeeq Ahamed, Anwar Ali, B. K. Harinarayanan, Vinayak Sasikumar, Sarath and Anil Panachooran, and singers Vineeth Sreenivasan, Shreya Ghoshal, Shankar Mahadevan, Vijay Yesudas, Shweta Mohan, Karthik, Naresh Iyer, Manjari, Haricharan, Shahabaz Aman, Sithara Krishnakumar, Vaikom Vijayalakshmi, K. S. Harisankar, Sayanora Philip, Benny Dayal and Jyotsna Radhakrishnan, along with stalwarts in the field.

Composers like Deepak Dev, Rex Vijayan, Rahul Raj, Jakes Bejoy, Sushin Shyam, and Prashant Pillai are known for using electronics, digital sounds, and a variety of genres in Malayalam film scores and songs.

The National Award-winning music composers of Malayalam cinema are Johnson (1994, 1995), Ravi (1995), Ouseppachan (2008), Ilaiyaraaja (2010), Isaac Thomas Kottukapally (2011), Bijibal (2012) and M. Jayachandran (2016). Until 2009, the 1995 National Award that Johnson received for the film score of Sukrutham (1994) was the only instance in the history of the award in which the awardee composed the Soundtrack rather than its Playback singer. He shared that award with Bombay Ravi, who received the award for composing songs for the same film. In 2010 and 2011, the awards given to film scores were won by Malayalam films: Kerala Varma Pazhassi Raja (Ilaiyaraaja) and Adaminte Makan Abu (Isaac Thomas Kottukapally). Raveendran also received a Special Mention in 1991 for composing songs for the film Bharatham.

The lyricists who have won the National Award are Vayalar Ramavarma (1973), O. N. V. Kurup (1989) and Yusufali Kechery (2001). The male singers who have received the National Award are K. J. Yesudas (1973, 1974, 1988, 1992, 1994, 2017), P. Jayachandran (1986) and M. G. Sreekumar (1991, 2000). Yesudas has won two more National Awards for singing in Hindi (1977) and Telugu (1983) films, which makes him the person who has won the most National Film Award for Best Male Playback Singer, with eight. The female singers who have won the award are S. Janaki (1981) and K. S. Chithra (1987, 1989). Chitra had also won the award for Tamil (1986, 1997, 2005) and Hindi (1998) film songs, which makes her the person with the most National Film Award for Best Female Playback Singer awards, six times.

== Landmark films ==
Year	Title	Director	Notes	Ref.
1928	Vigathakumaran	J. C. Daniel	First Malayalam feature film. Production started in 1928, and it was released at the Capitol Theatre in Thiruvananthapuram on 23 October 1930. It was produced and directed by J. C. Daniel, a businessman with no prior film experience, who is credited as the father of Malayalam cinema	
1933	Marthanda Varma	P.V. Rao	First copyright case in Indian film industry as well as literature publishing of Kerala	
1938	Balan	S. Nottani	First talkie in Malayalam. Directed by S. Nottani, this movie was the first commercially successful film	
1948	Nirmala	P. V. Krishna Iyer	Introduced playback singing in Malayalam cinema	
1951	Jeevitha Nouka	K. Vembu	First Blockbuster at the Kerala box office	
1954	Neelakuyil	P. Bhaskaran; Ramu Kariat	First Malayalam film to win a National Film Award	
1955	C.I.D.	M. Krishnan Nair	First crime thriller film in Malayalam	
1955	Newspaper Boy	P. Ramdas	First neo realistic film in Malayalam	
1960	Poothaali	P. Subramaniam	The first film to use a double role in Malayalam cinema. TK Balachandran is the actor who played the first double role in Malayalam cinema throughout this movie.	
1961	Kandam Bacha Coat	Shiyas Chennattu	First colour film in Malayalam cinema.	
1964	Bhargavi Nilayam	A. Vincent	First horror film in Malayalam cinema.	
1965	Chemmeen	Ramu Kariat	First Malayalam as well as South Indian film to win the National Film Award for Best Feature Film, and the first film to participate in an international film festival	
1965	Murappennu	A. Vincent	First film to be shot outdoors	
1967	Chithramela	T. S. Muthaiah	First anthology film	
1972	Swayamvaram	Adoor Gopalakrishnan	Pioneered "new-wave cinema movement" in Malayalam; first Malayalam film to win the National Film Award for Best Direction	
1974	Kanchana Sita	G. Aravindan	Pioneered independent filmmaking in South India	
1978	Thacholi Ambu	Navodaya Appachan	First CinemaScope film in Malayalam and also the first Malayalam film to gross more than 1 crore at the box office.	
1981	Oridathoru Phayalvaan	P. Padmarajan	First Malayalam Film won International awards, by winning Best Film and Best Screenplay at 27th Asian Film Festival (1982)	
1982	Padayottam	Jijo Punnoose	First 70mm film in South India	
1984	My Dear Kuttichathan	Jijo Punnoose	First 3D film in India. This is a 1984 Indian Malayalam-language fantasy film directed by Jijo Punnoose and produced by his father Navodaya Appachan under Navodaya Studio. It was the first Indian film to be filmed in 3D format.	
1986	Amma Ariyan	John Abraham	First Malayalam film produced by collecting funds from the public and the only South Indian film to feature in British Film Institute's Top 10 Indian Films list	
1993	O' Faby	K. Sreekuttan	India's first live-action/animation hybrid film	.
1994	Swaham	Shaji N. Karun	First Malayalam film to compete for the Palme d'Or at the Cannes Film Festival	
1997	Guru	Rajiv Anchal	First Malayalam film to be submitted as India's official entry to the Oscars to be considered for nomination in the Best Foreign Language Film category	
2000	Millennium Stars	Jayaraj	First Malayalam film released in this millennium.	
2005	Athbhutha Dweepu	Vinayan	The film was given an entry into the Guinness Book of Records for casting the most dwarves in a single film, and its lead actor Ajaykumar was given an entry for being the shortest actor to play the lead in the history of cinema.	
2006	Moonnamathoral	V. K. Prakash	First Malayalam digital movie, and first high-definition (HD) cinema to be digitally distributed to theatres via satellite	
2008	Twenty:20	Joshiy	First Malayalam film to cross ₹25 and ₹30 crores gross collection from theatres	
2009	Pazhassi Raja	Hariharan	First Malayalam film to get a home video release in Blu-ray format	
2012	Grandmaster	B. Unnikrishnan	First Malayalam film to release with subtitles (English) in outside Kerala, in other than film festival screenings. First Malayalam film to release on Netflix.	
2013	Drishyam	Jeethu Joseph	First Malayalam film to cross ₹50 crores gross collection from theatres	
2016	Pulimurugan	Vysakh	First Malayalam film to cross ₹100 and ₹150 crores gross collection from theatres	
2020	Fourth River	RK DreamWest	First Malayalam film to be released directly on the over-the-top (OTT) platform	
2020	C U Soon	Mahesh Narayanan	India's first computer screen film	
2021	Santhoshathinte Onnam Rahasyam	Don Palathara	First Malayalam film as the entire movie is of an 85 minute single shot	
2021	Kurup	Srinath Rajendran	First Indian film to have Non-fungible token (NFT) collectibles.	
2021	Minnal Murali	Basil Joseph	First Superhero film of Malayalam cinema	
2022	Vazhiye	Nirmal Baby Varghese	First Found footage film of Malayalam cinema	
2022	Ela Veezha Poonchira	Shahi Kabir	First movie to release in 4k Dolby HDR	
2024	Bramayugam	Rahul Sadasivan	First monochrome film in India to cross ₹50 crores gross collection from theatres. It is the first Indian film which premiered in the Academy Museum of Motion Pictures.	
2024	Manjummel Boys	Chidambaram	First Malayalam film to cross ₹200 crores gross collection from theatres	
2025	L2: Empuraan	Prithviraj Sukumaran	First Malayalam film to release in IMAX and EPIQ resolutions. First Malayalam film to cross the milestone of ₹250 crore.	
2025	Lokah Chapter 1: Chandra	Dominic Arun	Highest grossing female-led film in India. First Superheroine film of Indian and Malayalam cinema and first Malayalam film to cross ₹300 crores in box office collection, and Malayalam film with highest footfalls in 21st century.	

== Kerala State Film Awards ==
The Kerala State Film Awards are given to motion pictures made in the Malayalam language. The awards have been bestowed by Kerala State Chalachitra Academy since 1998 on behalf of the Department of Cultural Affairs of the government of Kerala. The awards were started in 1969. The awardees are decided by an independent jury formed by the academy and the Department of Cultural Affairs. The jury usually consists of personalities from the film field. For the awards for literature on cinema, a separate jury is formed. The academy annually invites films for the award and the jury analyses the films before deciding the winners. The awards intend to promote films with artistic values and encourage artists and technicians.

== International Film Festival of Kerala ==
The International Film Festival of Kerala (IFFK) is held annually in Thiruvananthapuram, the capital city of Kerala. It was started in 1996 and is organised by Kerala State Chalachitra Academy on behalf of the Department of Cultural Affairs of the State Government. It is held in November/December every year and is acknowledged as one of the leading film festivals in India.

== Film studios ==
Today, most of the film studios are located in Kochi, where the majority of the pre- and post-film production works are conducted. All the major film production companies in the Malayalam film industry, including Aashirvad Cinemas, Friday Film House, Kokers Media Entertainments, Maxlab Cinemas and Entertainments, Prithviraj Productions, are located in Kochi.

The Travancore National Pictures was the first film studio in Kerala. It was established by J. C. Daniel in 1926 in Thiruvananthapuram, which was then a part of Travancore. Producer-director Kunchacko and film distributor K. V. Koshy established Udaya Studios in Alappuzha in 1947. The studio influenced the gradual shift of Malayalam film industry from its original base of Chennai, Tamil Nadu to Kerala. In 1951, P. Subramaniam established Merryland Studio in Nemom, Thiruvananthapuram. The other major studios are Sreekrishna (1952, Thiruvananthapuram), Ajantha (1958, Keezhmadu – now extinct), Chithralekha (1965, Aakkulam, Thiruvananthapuram), Uma Studio (1975, Thiruvananthapuram), Navodaya, Kochi (1978, Thrikkakkara, Kochi) and Chitranjali Studio (1980, Thiruvananthapuram).

== Organisations ==
The Association of Malayalam Movie Artists (A.M.M.A) is an association of Malayalam film actors and artists based in Kochi is an organisation formed by artists of Malayalam cinema. It aims to act against piracy, to safeguard the interests of member actors and actresses, and to serve as a common forum to raise concerns and address issues. The activities of AMMA include endowments, insurance schemes, and committees on wages and benefits on revision, funds for research, pensions, and education loans for the children of the members. The organisation ventured into film production in 2008 with Twenty:20 to raise funds for its activities.

Organisations such as Kerala Film Producers Association, Kerala Film Distributors Association, Kerala Cine Exhibitors Federation, Hyperlink Film Club and Kerala Film Exhibitors Association have coordinated work stoppages.

== Awards ==
=== National Film Award for Best Feature Film ===
Year	Film
1965	Chemmeen
1972	Swayamvaram
1973	Nirmalyam
1985	Chidambaram
1988	Piravi
1995	Kathapurushan
1999	Vanaprastham
2000	Shantham
2006	Pulijanmam
2009	Kutty Srank
2010	Adaminte Makan Abu
2019	Marakkar: Lion of the Arabian Sea
2022	Aattam

=== National Film Award for Best Popular Film ===
Year	Film
1992	Sargam
1993	Manichitrathazhu
2012	Ustad Hotel

=== Dadasaheb Phalke Award ===
Year	Recipient	Note(s)
2004	Adoor Gopalakrishnan	Director
2023	Mohanlal	Actor

=== State awards ===
- Kerala State Film Awards
- Kerala Film Critics Association Awards

=== Regional Awards ===
- Filmfare Awards South
- IIFA Utsavam
- South Indian International Movie Awards

== See also ==
- List of highest-grossing Malayalam films
- List of Malayalam film actors
- New generation (Malayalam film movement)
- Malayalam softcore pornography
- Cinema of South India
- List of cinema of the world
- Lists of Malayalam films
- Category:Film production companies of Kerala
- K. R. Narayanan National Institute of Visual Science and Arts

== Sources ==
- Chandran, VP (2018). Mathrubhumi Yearbook Plus – 2019 (Malayalam ed.). Kozhikode: P. V. Chandran, Managing Editor, Mathrubhumi Printing & Publishing Company Limited, Kozhikode.
