= Kadathanaattu Maakkam =

- Directed by: Navodaya Appachan
- Written by: P. K. Sarangapani
- Screenplay by: P. K. Sarangapani
- Produced by: Navodaya (a partnership concern)
- Starring: Prem Nazir; Jayan; Sheela; Sukumari
- Cinematography: U. Rajagopal
- Edited by: T. R. Sekhar
- Music by: G. Devarajan
- Production company: Navodaya (a partnership concern)
- Distributed by: Navodaya (a partnership concern)
- Release date: 7 April 1978
- Country: India
- Language: Malayalam

Kadathanaattu Maakkam is a 1978 Indian Malayalam-language epic-fantasy film directed by Navodaya Appachan and produced by Navodaya (a partnership concern). The film stars Prem Nazir, Jayan, Sheela and Sukumari in the lead roles. The film has musical score by G. Devarajan.

== Plot ==
Maakkam, only sister to four beloved brothers belongs to the famed Ilavannoor Madom. However all her sister-in-laws except the youngest one Purani are jealous of Maakkam and plot to turn their husbands against her.

Meanwhile, the brave warrior Unni Kurup is in love with Maakkam's best friend Unniyamma. Their marriage is fixed by Unniyamma's brother the famous Thacholi Othenan. But a rival claimant, the villainous Kunjikannan wants to marry her on the basis of on an old promise. Maakkam, the mediator to the dispute declares that a duel must be fought between the two claimants for Unniyamma's hand. Unni Kurup wins the duel but Kunjikannan swipes him with a poison tipped sword. It is Maakkam who discovers that Kunjikannan cheated and proclaims him guilty. As a result, he loses his leg with the same poisonous sword. Both him and his sister, who is also Maakam's eldest sister-in-law, are furious with Maakkam and swears vengeance.

When the brothers go in search of a suitable groom for their sister, the three sisters-in-law, steal gold, money and grains from the stores of the house and send them off to their respective homes. When the brothers return the wives turn them against Maakkam.

Swearing to destroy Maakkam, Bhayami plots to kill her and poisons her food with the help of the cooks. But it was Purani who fell victim to the trap. Purani on her deathbed, realises she was poisoned and the target was Maakkam, but the way her last words came out implies that Maakkam was the one who poisoned her and this was supported by the cooks on being forced by Bhayami.

Maakkam is also accused of having an illicit relationship with Nambeeshan, a mental patient, played by Prem Nazir. Both are convicted and sentenced to death. Maakkam consummates her relationship with Nambeeshan on the night before the execution.

On the day of the execution, Thacholi Othenan along with his sister Unniyamma and his Kalari students, attack the executioner and others rescue Maakkam and Nambeeshan. Unniyamma sacrifices her life and saves Maakkam. Years later her son returns seeking revenge and clearing his mother's name.

== Cast ==
- Prem Nazir as Nambeeshan and Kannan (Double role)
- Jayan as Unni Kurup
- Sheela as Kadathanattu Makkam
- Sukumari as Purani
- Jayabharathi as Unniyamma
- KPAC Lalitha as Nangeli
- Adoor Bhasi as Siddhan
- Sreelatha Namboothiri as Navami
- Unnimary as Thiruthandhina
- Adoor Pankajam as Ittaathaatty
- Alummoodan as Velu
- G. K. Pillai as Ramabhadran
- Janardanan as Kunjikannan
- K. P. Ummer as Thacholi Othenan
- Lalithasree as Ponnukaayi
- Meena as Bhayami
- N. Govindankutty as Rudrappan
- S. P. Pillai as Paanan
- Thikkurisi as Nambeesan's father

== Soundtrack ==
The music was composed by G. Devarajan and the lyrics were written by P. Bhaskaran and Chirayinkeezhu Ramakrishnan Nair.

No.	Song	Singers	Lyrics	Length (m:ss)
1	"Aanandanadanam"	K. J. Yesudas, P. Susheela, P. Leela, P. Madhuri, B. Vasantha	P. Bhaskaran	
2	"Aayilyam Kaavilamma"	K. J. Yesudas	P. Bhaskaran	
3	"Aayilyam Kavilamme Vida"	K. J. Yesudas	Chirayinkeezhu Ramakrishnan Nair	
4	"Akkareyakkareyallo"	K. J. Yesudas	P. Bhaskaran	
5	"Amme Sharanam"	K. J. Yesudas	P. Bhaskaran	
6	"Ilavannoor Madhathile"	K. J. Yesudas	P. Bhaskaran	
7	"Kaalamaam Ashwathin"	K. J. Yesudas	Chirayinkeezhu Ramakrishnan Nair	
8	"Kaaverikkarayilezhum"	K. J. Yesudas, P. Susheela	P. Bhaskaran	
9	"Neettiya Kaikalil"	K. J. Yesudas	Chirayinkeezhu Ramakrishnan Nair	
10	"Ooriya Vaalithu"	K. J. Yesudas	P. Bhaskaran	
