= Lora Neeyevide =

- Directed by: K Raghunath
- Written by: Muttathu Varkey
- Screenplay by: Muttathu Varkey
- Produced by: M. Kunchacko
- Starring: Prem Nazir; Ushakumari; K. P. Ummer; KPAC Lalitha; Adoor Pankajam
- Cinematography: R. C. Purushothaman
- Edited by: T. R. Sekhar
- Music by: M. S. Baburaj
- Production company: Excel Productions
- Distributed by: Excel Productions
- Release date: 7 May 1971
- Country: India
- Language: Malayalam

Lora Neeyevide (transl. Lora Where are you?) is a 1971 Indian Malayalam film, directed by T. R. Raghunath and produced by M. Kunchacko. The film stars Prem Nazir, Ushakumari, K. P. Ummer, KPAC Lalitha, Radhika and Adoor Pankajam in the lead roles. The film had musical score by M. S. Baburaj.

== Cast ==
- Prem Nazir as Bernard
- Ushakumari as Lora
- K. P. Ummer as Somappan
- Kottayam Chellappan as Dr Kurian Thomas
- Alummoodan as Jeofry
- KPAC Lalitha as Meenu
- Radhika as Theresa Williams
- S. P. Pillai as Ponnappan
- Adoor Pankajam as Kuttyamma
- Bhargavan as Anto
- Vijaya Kumari as Rebecca
- K. S. Gopinath as Dr. Paul
- Jismol as Nazeema
- Joseph Chacko as Lazer
- Kottayam Narayanan
- Natarajan
- Rajamma
- S. J. Dev as Father D'Souza

== Soundtrack ==
The music was composed by M. S. Baburaj and the lyrics were written by Vayalar Ramavarma.

No.	Song	Singers	Length (m:ss)
1	"Braanthaalayam"	K. J. Yesudas	
2	"Kaalam Oru Pravaaham"	K. J. Yesudas	
3	"Karppoora Nakshathradeepam"	S. Janaki	
4	"Kizhakke Malayile"	A. M. Rajah, B. Vasantha	
5	"Muttuvin Vaathil Thurakkum" [Bit]	Chorus	
6	"Shilpame Premakalaashilpame"	K. J. Yesudas, B. Vasantha	
