= Theekkadal =

1980 film by Navodaya Appachan

- Poster
- Directed by: Navodaya Appachan
- Written by: Fazil
- Screenplay by: Fazil
- Produced by: Navodaya Appachan
- Starring: Prem Nazir; Madhu; Sukumaran; Srividya
- Cinematography: Anandakuttan
- Music by: Guna Singh
- Production company: Navodaya Studio
- Release date: 3 April 1980
- Country: India
- Language: Malayalam

Theekkadal is a 1980 Indian Malayalam-language film directed and produced by Navodaya Appachan under Navodaya Studio. The film stars Prem Nazir, Madhu, Sukumaran and Srividya.

== Cast ==
- Prem Nazir as Balakrishnan
- Madhu as Divakaran
- Sukumaran as Varghese
- Srividya as Sridevi
- Kuthiravattam Pappu as Pappan
- Ravi Kumar as Dr. Prasannan
- Ambika as Sumam
- Aranmula Ponnamma as Balakrishnan's Mother
- Ratheesh
- Bahadoor as Shekharan Pillai
- Roopa
- Haseena Aman as Shobha
- Paravoor Bharathan as Kochu

== Soundtrack ==
The music was composed by Guna Singh.

No.	Song	Singers	Lyrics	Length (m:ss)
1	"Adichangu Poosayi"	K. J. Yesudas	Bichu Thirumala	04:12
2	"Cheppum Pandum"	K. J. Yesudas, P. Susheela	Bichu Thirumala	04:47
3	"Enthenthu Pavanam"	K. J. Yesudas	A. P. Gopalan	04:29
4	"Ponnurukki"	P. Susheela	A. P. Gopalan	04:38
