= Jijo Punnoose =

Indian film director, producer and actor

- Born: Alappuzha, India
- Occupations: Actor; Film director
- Years active: 1962–present
- Father: Navodaya Appachan

Jijo Punnoose is an Indian film director, producer and actor from Kerala. He is best known for directing the two landmark films in Malayalam cinema—Padayottam (1982) and My Dear Kuttichathan (1984). Jijo directed Padayottam, the first 70 mm film of South Indian cinema, and My Dear Kuttichathan is the first 3D film in India. He is the son of Navodaya Appachan.

== Early life and family ==
Jijo was born as the eldest son of producer Navodaya Appachan, in a Syro Malabar Catholic family in Alappuzha, Kerala. He hails from the Maliampurakal family, which is credited with owning the first film studio in Kerala, Udaya Studios; considered the ancestral home of the Malayalam film industry. His great-grandfather, M. M. Chacko, started the first boat service in Kuttanadu.

Jijo is the nephew of legendary film producer Kunchacko, who established Udaya Studios. He is a relative of Kunchacko Boban, an Indian actor and film producer.

== Career ==
Padayottam was a wide canvas film produced by Navodaya Appachan. The story was inspired from the novel The Count of Monte Cristo. It was the first 70 mm film in South Indian cinema. In 1984, he directed My Dear Kuttichathan, India's first 3D film.

== Filmography ==
Year	Title	Actor	Director	Notes
1962	Bharya	Yes		
1965	Inapraavugal	Yes		
1966	Thilothama	Yes		
1970	Pearl View	Yes		
1980	Theekkadal			Assistant director
1982	Padayottam		Yes	
1984	My Dear Kuttichathan		Yes	
1991	Bible Ki Kahaniya			Creative director; TV serial
2024	Barroz: Guardian of D'Gama's Treasure			Screenplay
