= My Dear Kuttichathan =

- Promotional poster
- Directed by: Jijo Punnoose
- Written by: Raghunath Paleri
- Produced by: Navodaya Appachan; Jose Punnoose
- Starring: Master Aravind; Sonia; Master Mukesh; Surya Kiran; Kottarakkara Sreedharan Nair; Dalip Tahil; Rajan P. Dev; Jagathi Sreekumar; Jagadish; Nedumudi Venu
- Cinematography: Ashok Kumar
- Edited by: T. R. Sekar
- Music by: Ilaiyaraaja; Lyrics: Bichu Thirumala
- Production company: Navodaya Studios
- Distributed by: Navodaya Release
- Release date: August 24, 1984 (India)
- Running time: 97 minutes
- Country: India
- Language: Malayalam
- Budget: ₹45 lakh (US$47,000)
- Box office: ₹10.5 crore (US$1.1 million)

My Dear Kuttichathan (transl. My dear little goblin) is a 1984 Indian Malayalam-language children's fantasy film directed by Jijo Punnoose and produced by his father Navodaya Appachan under Navodaya Studio. It was the first Indian film to be filmed in 3D format. With screenplay by Raghunath Paleri, the story revolves around a mystical indigenous goblin called "Kuttichathan" who is under the spell of an evil sorcerer, however it gets released by three children and then befriends them. The film's soundtrack was composed by Ilaiyaraaja, with cinematography and editing by Ashok Kumar and T. R. Shekhar, respectively. It was the debut film of actors Jagadish and Zainuddin.

The film was well received and grossed over ₹2.5 crore at the box office. Originally filmed in Malayalam, a re-edited version was re-released in 1997 with additional scenes of Kalabhavan Mani, which makes it the first DTS movie in Malayalam. It was dubbed in Hindi as Chhota Chetan in 1998, which was also a box office success grossing ₹10.30 crore. Scenes with Urmila Matondkar were added for the Hindi version. In 2010, further scenes were added in Tamil with Prakash Raj and Santhanam and was released as Chutti Chathan. A new re-mastered version with additional footage was released on 25 August 2011.

== Malayalam Plot ==
The character "Kuttichathan" is formed based on the specialties of a deity goblin popularly known as "Chathan" who is worshiped mainly in the south Indian state of Kerala. There are cruel sorcerers everywhere in the world. One of them is Karimbhootham, who enslaved an invisible spirit with his magic spells through a talisman, whom he calls "Kuttichathan" ("Little Goblin" in English and "Chhota Chetan" in Hindi). The cruel sorcerer wants the Kuttichathan to lay his hands on a treasure hidden and protected by magic. Two boys, Vijay and Vinod and a girl, Laxmi accidentally release Kuttichathan from the grip of the sorcerer and befriend him.

They understand that this Chathan is friendly to kids and is a very good friend. Therefore, the girl promises to keep Kuttichathan in her house for two reasons: one, her father drinks too much, so she wants Chathan, who is a very good magician, to make him come to his senses, as after her mother died, there is no one to control him; second, Chathan, despite being a small boy, also drinks a lot. He could drink and finish off all that her father drinks, thereby changing her father's attitude. Eventually Kuttichathan helps Laxmi reconcile with her redeemed father. But soon Karimbhootham recaptures Kuttichathan and forces him to find the treasure by threatening him to harm a captured Laxmi. Learning of this, Vijay and Vinod burns the talisman binding Kuttichathan. Freed from the talisman, an angry Kuttichathan burns and kills Karimbhootham. But as a price for destroying the talisman, Chathan is then turned into a bat and flies away.

== Hindi Plot ==
Chetan is an innocent spirit placed in a temple. One night the temple priest's young daughter witnesses the urn containing Chetan being stolen by her father's disciple. The temple priest dies of grief and the daughter promises him that she will bring Chetan back. Even after many years, the disciple failed to completely enslave Chetan as he wants to uncover a treasure. But Chetan is accidentally released and befriended by two boys, Vijay and Vinod, and a girl, Laxmi. Meanwhile the temple priest's now adult daughter with the alias Miss Hawa Hawaii locates the disciple and Chetan with the help of two good-natured thieves who are also after the treasure. As Chetan helps the children in many ways, the disciple recaptures Chetan and captures Laxmi (who was following the disciple to help Chetan). Eventually, the temple priest's daughter frees Chetan from the disciple's control through her magic and Chetan kills the disciple. But as a price for killing his former master, Chetan is cursed and turned into a bat. Then the temple priest's daughter takes him back to fulfil her promise to her father.

== Cast ==
- M. P. Ramnath/Master Aravind – Kuttichathan (voice of invisible Kuttichatan by Nedumudi Venu)
- Sonia – Laxmi
- Master Suresh — Vijay
- Master Arvind — Vinod
- Master Mukesh
- Kottarakkara Sreedharan Nair – The Cruel Sorcerer
- Dalip Tahil – Laxmi's father
- Alummoodan
- P. A. Latheef
- Aman M. A.
- Jagathy Sreekumar (Added Portion in 1998)
- Sainuddin – Bartender
- Rajan P. Dev – School Teacher
- Jagadeesh – Cabaret Announcer
- Kalabhavan Mani as Dakshinenthya Manthravaadhi (Added Portion in 1998)
- Kallapetti Singaram — Rickshaw driver'
- Indrans as traffic policeman (added portion in 1998)
- Salim Kumar (Added Portion in 1998)
- Nadirshah (Added Portion in 1998)

Hindi version

- Naseeruddin Shah as invisible voice of Chota Chetan
- Urmila Matondkar – Miss Hawa Hawaii
- Dalip Tahil – Laxmi's father
- Satish Kaushik – Professor Chashmish
- Shakti Kapoor – Baba Khondol
- Ravi Baswani – Raja
- Harish Kumar – Mr. Anthony Gonsalves

Tamil version

- Prakash Raj – The Cruel Sorcerer (Added Portion in 2010)
- Santhanam — Scientist (Added Portion in 2010)
- The film was introduced by cameo appearances from Prem Nazir, Amitabh Bachchan, Rajinikanth, Chiranjeevi, and Jeetendra in the opening sequence in all languages

== Production ==
=== Development ===
My Dear Kuttichathan was the first Indian film to be filmed in 3D. Jijo Punnoose, son of Navodaya Appachan made his directorial debut with this film. After Padayottam (1982), Jijo decided to direct a 3D film after getting inspired by an article in American Cinematographer shown to him by cinematographer Ramachandra Babu.

==== Technology ====
To understand the technology, Jijo travelled multiple trips to Burbank, California and bought sample reels of 3D films and held a preview in his studio. Appachan who was thoroughly convinced decided to produce this film under the allocated budget of 40 lakhs. David Schmier worked as the film's stereographer along with the film's cinematographer to ensure multiple images converge for 3D effect.

Jijo travelled to the United States once again where he met Chris Condon, an expert in 3D technology. Jijo bought the special camera lens and after much discussion Chris agreed to assist Jijo in his film. The required equipment needed for the film had to be imported from the United States and Jijo managed to do this with the help of his friend, Thomas J Easaw.

==== Script ====
For the 3D film, the makers wanted a universal theme in order to appeal children. Jijo carried the idea of a friendly ghost for years, he sought the opinion of people such as Anant Pai and Padmarajan for the film's writing. Raghunath Paleri came on board as the film's writer, took all the inputs from the experts and created the plot of three kids and a ghost. Paleri cited he wrote the script in such a way "that would have worked even if it was 2D".

=== Casting ===
S. L. Puram Anand, who worked as a production executive for this film revealed that Jijo wanted to do this film with an entirely new cast. Anand suggested Dalip Tahil for the supporting role. Sonia Bose and MD Ramnoth were cast as child artists. The latter portrayed the titular character.

Ashok Kumar handled cinematography for the film, thus making him the first cinematographer in India to have shot a 3D film. T. K. Rajeev Kumar, who went on to become a famous director, started his career as an assistant director with this film.

In the Hindi version shot in 1997, Shakti Kapoor plays the part of a magician (originally played by Alummoodan) who tries to catch Chetan, but gets trapped in a mirror. Prakash Raj did this role in its re-released Tamil version released in 2010. Satish Kaushik plays the part of Jagathi Sreekumar as a scientist who also tries to catch Chetan, but gets destroyed. This character was played as Santhanam in 2010 version.

=== Filming ===
Despite proper planning, the filming took around 90 days to complete, three times the schedule of a normal film. The budget for the lighting was higher than a 2D film. The filming was held at Navodaya Studios and places around the Kakkanad area. For the famous scene of walking on the wall, Paleri suggested the sequence to be converted into a song. The song "Aalipazham Perukka" took 14 days to be completed.

K. Sheker and Jijo decided on a rectangular-shaped rotating room to suit the wider, landscape-like nature of the 3D frame. Jijo then entrusted SILK (Steel Industrial Kerala) with the task of constructing a steel structure on the room, made of timber. The octagonal structure, weighing 25 tonnes, was completed in a month's time. Six men on either side would rotate it to create the illusion that the kids were walking 360 degrees around the room. The original Malayalam film was made at a cost of ₹35 lakh.

== Soundtrack ==
My Dear Kuttichathan [Malayalam]

Soundtrack album by Ilaiyaraaja
- Released: 1984
- Genre: Feature film soundtrack
- Label: JS Audio

All lyrics are written by Bichu Thirumala; all music is composed by Ilaiyaraaja.

My Dear Kuttichathan [Malayalam]
No.	Title	Artist(s)	Length
1.	"Aalippazham Perukkaan"	S. Janaki, S. P. Sailaja
2.	"Minnaaminungum"	K. J. Yesudas, Choir
3.	"Thrilokam Thilangum"	K. S. Chithra
4.	"Chirakaattykkili"	K. J. Yesudas
5.	"Thithithey Thaalam"	Bhavatharini

Chhota Chetan [Hindi]

Soundtrack album by Anu Malik
- Released: 1998
- Genre: Feature film soundtrack

All music is composed by Anu Malik.

Chhota Chetan [Hindi]
No.	Title	Artist(s)	Length
1.	"Chhota Chetan"	K. S. Chithra
2.	"Ek Jaadu Hone Wala Hai"	Shankar Mahadevan
3.	"Jo Tum Kaho"	Anuradha Sriram, Srinivas
4.	"Jo Tum Kaho (II)"	Aditya Narayan, Anmol Malik, Dominique Cerejo
5.	"Ringa Ringa Ro"	Shankar Mahadevan
6.	"Parody Song"	Shabbir Kumar, Anuradha Paudwal
7.	"Billi Boli Miyaoon"	Shabbir Kumar, Anuradha Paudwal
8.	"Bombai Ban Gayi Mumbai"	Aditya Narayan

My Dear Kutti Chathan [Tamil]

Soundtrack album by Ilaiyaraaja
- Released: 1984
- Genre: Feature film soundtrack

1984 version

All music is composed by Ilaiyaraaja.

Chutti Chathan [Tamil]
No.	Title	Artist(s)	Length
1.	"Chinnakuzhandhaigale"	Vani Jayaram, Sujatha Mohan
2.	"Poovaadai Kaatru"	K. J. Yesudas, Choir

2010 version

Chutti Chathan This version had new songs composed by Sharreth including re-created version of "Chinna Kuzhandhaigale" (Aalipazham Perukka). The lyrics was written by Madhan Karky.

- Kuttichathan Vanthenda – K. S. Chithra
- Andhara Tharagai – Sajjla
- Boom Boom Chathan – Sharreth & Chorus
- Ulagame Odidaathe – Srinivas

== Release ==
The film was released in 1984 along with dubbed versions in Tamil, Telugu and Hindi. The Telugu and Hindi versions were titled Chinnari Chethana and Chhota Chetan respectively. All the versions proved to be successful. For the watching experience, special lenses had to be attached to the projectors in theatres.

Navodaya distributed the film by themselves in Kerala. Keyaar distributed the Tamil version of the film. The Tamil version also became successful, surpassing bigger films. The film's release also attracted rumours that the use of 3D glasses was spreading conjunctivitis, which was dubbed "Madras Eye". These rumours prompted the makers to add footage before the film began with prominent actors Prem Nazir, Amitabh Bachchan, Jeetendra, Rajinikanth, Chiranjeevi and others explaining that the glasses were sterilised after each use.

Reviewing the Tamil dubbed version, Balumani of Anna newspaper praised the 3D effects and called it an entertaining film for children.

=== Box office ===
The film was commercial success and highest grossing Malayalam film at that time, which collected ₹ 2.5 crore from box office and it's Hindi dubbed version Chota Chetan also collected ₹ 1.3 crore from box office. The film ran over 365 days in Trivandrum, 250 days in both Chennai and Mumbai and 150 days in both Bengaluru and Hyderabad box office.

=== Re-releases ===
The film was re-released in 1997 which was also highly successful at the box office; it had earned 60 times its initial investment. The Hindi version was re-released by Nitin Manmohan in 1997, with additional scenes which involved Urmila Matondkar and other Hindi actors. In 2010, Sri Thenandal Films re-released the Tamil version, titled Chutti Chathan in 2010, with added scenes starring Santhanam and Prakash Raj.

== Legacy ==
The film inspired similar kinds of films in India. The optical illusion house set used in the song "Aalipazham Perukkaan" was built in Kishkinta Theme Park, near Tambaram, Chennai. Kuttichathan has also been cited as an inspiration for the feature films ARM (2024) and Lokah Chapter 1: Chandra (2025).
