= Navodaya Studio =

Indian film studio

- Company type: Private
- Industry: Entertainment industry
- Founded: 1976
- Founder: Navodaya Appachan
- Headquarters: Kakkanad, Kochi, Kerala, India
- Area served: Worldwide
- Key people: Jijo Punnoose; Jose Punnoose
- Products: Motion pictures
- Divisions: Navodaya Movietone; Navodaya Release
- Website: navodayastudio.com

Navodaya Studio is an Indian film studio headquartered at Kochi, Kerala. It is one of the earliest film studios in Kerala, established in 1976 by Navodaya Appachan. Navodaya is known for producing some of the landmark films in Indian cinema.

== History ==
The studio was founded by Apachan in 1976, after he parted ways with his brother Kunchacko's Udaya Studio.

== Works ==
The first film Kadathanattu Makkam produced by Navodaya studio was directed by Appachan himself. The second film Thacholi Ambu was the first cinemascope film in Malayalam. It was followed by Padayottam, which was the first 70 mm film in India. The post production work of Sholay, the first 70 mm production in India was done in the United Kingdom. But for Padayottam, the works were done at Prasad Labs, Trivandrum. In 1982, India's first 3D film, My Dear Kuttichathan was released. Apart from these landmark films, Navodaya also produced numerous hit films in Malayalam including Thacholi Ambu, My Dear Kuttichathan, Manjil Virinja Pookkal, Padayottam and Chanakyan.

The studio was later renovated in 2000's welcoming the needs of the television industry. Appachan's sons Jijo Punnoose and Jose Punnoose has taken over the functioning.

Appachan, along with the Navodaya Studios, was awarded the J. C. Daniel Award in 2011.
