= Padayottam (1982 film) =

1982 Indian epic period drama film

- Poster
- Directed by: Jijo Punnoose
- Screenplay by: N. Govindan Kutty
- Based on: The Count of Monte Cristo by Alexandre Dumas
- Produced by: Navodaya (a partnership concern)
- Starring: Prem Nazir; Madhu; Lakshmi; Shankar; Poornima Bhagyaraj; Mammootty; Mohanlal
- Cinematography: Ramachandra Babu; J. Williams (Additional photography)
- Edited by: T. R. Shekhar
- Music by: Guna Singh
- Production company: Navodaya (a partnership concern)
- Distributed by: Navodaya Release
- Release date: 6 August 1982
- Running time: 178 minutes
- Country: India
- Language: Malayalam
- Budget: ₹1 crore

Padayottam (transl. Battle march) is a 1982 Indian Malayalam-language epic period drama film directed by Jijo Punnoose and produced by Navodaya (a partnership concern). It is partly based on the 1844 novel The Count of Monte Cristo by Alexandre Dumas, who is credited for the story with a screenplay written by N. Govindan Kutty. The film stars Prem Nazir, Madhu, Lakshmi, Shankar, Poornima Bhagyaraj, Mammootty, Mohanlal, N. Govindan Kutty and Thikkurissy Sukumaran Nair.

== Plot ==
The Kolathiri Raja is a ruler of Northern Kerala. The Raja's second nephew, Prince Udayan, was named successor to the throne in accordance with matrilineal traditions over his elder nephew, Prince Devan. The Raja also arranged Udayan's marriage to his daughter, Princess Parvathi. This decision conflicted with Devan's ambition to succeed the Raja and marry Parvathi.

On the other hand, two nobles of the court, Kammaran and Perumana Kuruppu were upset by Udayan's ascension. Cashing in on Devan's frustrations, Kammaran made Prince Devan against Prince Udayan. For this, Kammaran used Kompan, a dacoit leader who was a frequent raider in many villages, to stage a royal pardon and sought the presence of Prince Udayan in his position as Crown Prince for signing the peace treaty. Without knowing it was a trap laid by Kammaran and Kuruppu, Udayan drove to Kompan's camp, only to fall into the trap laid. However, news flashed in the country as Prince Udayan betrayed Kolathiri Raja and killed Moithooti. This made the Raja furious, who declared Udayan a traitor and cancelled the marriage.

Kompan instructs his men to kill Udayan. However, they decided to sell him as a slave to a cruel Slave ship captain Mooppan. While as a slave, he meets another slave, Kunjali, from whom he learns the death of Kolathiri Raja and his queen at Marakkar's boat by forces arranged by Perumana Kuruppu and Kompan. Marakkar tried to save the Kolathiri Raja and his queen but was killed by Perumana Kuruppu. Kunjali, the trusted slave, however, saved Marakkar's daughter, Lalia, with the help of his men. However, he could not escape himself from the Kompan's men, who sold him into slavery. From Kunjali, Udayan learned where the treasures of Marakkar and his daughter were taken to. In the meantime, Prince Devan married Princess Parvathi and became the new Kolathiri Raja. However, the royal sceptre were missing.

After some years, Udayan and his fellow slaves staged a mutiny on the ship, killing the captain Moopan and releasing themselves. Udayan ran away and became a rich merchant Thampan after finding the lost treasures of Marakkar and his daughter Lalia. Both decided to make a return to Kolathirinadu in disguise to make their revenge. They return to the Kolathiri Kingdom in a floating palace as a merchant Thampan and princess. Years made people forget Udayan, and no one was able to recognize him in his new attire and lifestyle as Thampan, except Queen Parvathi, who understood him just at a glimpse.

King Devan and Queen Parvathi's son, Prince Chandran fell in love with Laila. Meanwhile, Thampan (Udayan) was hatching a plot to trap Perumana Kuruppu after learning that the sceptre of Kolathiri Raja were in his custody, as King Devan declared it missing. Thampan (Udayan) approached Perumana Kuruppu and let him know that he is interested in purchasing sceptre at an astronomical price, which lured Kuruppu to bring them out from their secret place. However, he was caught red-handed by the public and brought before trial. At the trial, he declared that the old Raja had given the sceptre to him for attempting to rescue the king from attack, and he challenged the prosecutors that they have no evidence against him for betrayal and robbery. It was at this moment that Lalia entered into the court to declare her true identity as Princess Laila – the heir apparent of Marakkar and presented herself as the sole eyewitness to the incident. This made Perumana Kuruppu kill himself.

Thampan"s (Udayan) second target was Kammaran. Kompan asking money to avoid attack the country. The kingdom was facing extreme financial crisis due to mismanagement and corruption. Prince Chandran advises the king to seek financial assistance from the visiting Merchant Thampan (Udayan). As per the instruction Devan, Kammaran pays a visit to the Udayan's palace to seek finance without understanding his true identity. Udayan refused to finance; rather, he says that he would finance if Kammaran becomes king. This offer made Kammaran greedy, and he hatches a plan to trap Devan similar to the way by which he trapped Udayan earlier. In the meantime, Udayan double-crosses Kammaran by sending a message to the Devan directly that he is ready to finance. This made Devan suspicious of Kammaran, and secretly, through his spies, he understands the plot his close friend Kammaran made to trap him.

Kammaran repeats the old strategy with the assistance of the Kompan, who asked the king to come directly with a tribute in order to prevent an attack & hand over the money. However, understanding the trap, Devan comes with a cash chest with soldiers hiding inside, and they attack Kammaran and Kompan in surprise. While Devan orders his forces to arrest Kammaran, But he escapes & Joined Kompan's team.

Thampan's (Udayan) final revenge is now against Devan, and he was planning on that. In the meantime, Prince Chandran through his close friend Kannan, who was Kammaran's son; discovered Udayan's double cross. He understood it was Udayan who spoiled the relationships between Kammaran and Devan and challenged Udayan to a public duel, which Udayan accepts.

Prince Chandran is asked by Queen Parvathi not to participate in the duel with Udayan. He questioned his mother, and Parvathi says it is a result of Devan's sins. Chandran surrenders to Udayan while at the duel. Hearing his son's surrender without a fight made King Devan furious, so he went to Thampan's (Udayan) palace to challenge him. It was there, for the first time after his betrayal, Devan saw Udayan, which made him fall down.

Devan returns home, and Chandran questions his father about past sins. Parvathi tells Chandran not to question his father and meets Udayan to inform him that Devan has paid for his sins by raising up Chandran despite knowing that he was actually the son of Udayan. This made Udayan to forget his revenge and he forgives Devan. Meanwhile, Kammaran and Kompan raided the palace. As the king had fallen and attack was unexpected, the Kolathiri forces were overrun by the Kammaran & Kompan raiders. However, timely intervention of Udayan's army killed Kammaran, Kompan and all his mens. Udayan hands over his stepdaughter Lalia to Parvathi and is shown walking away.

== Cast ==
- Prem Nazir as Udayan, Thampan Kolathiri Raja's second nephew handsome, brave and intelligent. Younger brother of Devan and biological father of Chandran and step father of Laila respectively.
- Madhu as Devan, Eldest nephew of Kolathiri Raja and elder brother of Udayan. Later the king, husband of Queen Parvathy and step-father of Chandran.
- Mammootty as Kammaran Friend of Devan, later the minister of the kingdom and the father of Kannan.
- Lakshmi as Parvathi, daughter of Kolathiri Raja, wife of Devan and mother of Chandran.
- Shankar as Prince Chandran, son of Udayan and Parvathy and Devan's stepson who fall in love with Laila.
- Poornima Bhagyaraj as Laila, Ali Raja's daughter and Udayan's stepdaughter
- Mohanlal as Kannan, Son of Kammaran and friend of Chandran.
- N. Govindan Kutty as Perumana Kurup
- Jalaja as Aiysha
- Sathaar as Moithooti, Udayan's helper
- Thikkurussi Sukumaran Nair as Kolathiri Raja
- Pappu as Pokkan
- G. K. Pillai as Payyanadan Nambyar, Padathalavan
- Achankunju as Mooppan, slave ship captain
- Alummoodan as Kolumban, Udayan's helper
- Sukumari as Chiruthevi Thampuratti
- Meena as Kolathiri Raja's Wife
- Balan K. Nair as Marakkar
- Ceylon Manohar as Kompan
- Paravoor Bharathan as Mammootty, Moithootti's Father
- Kothuku Nanappan as Kunjali, Marakkar Helper
- Kaduvakkulam Antony as Slave ship captain Helper
- Haseena Aman as Slave girl

== Production ==
Padayottam was a big-budget film with a production cost of ₹1 crore when the average cost for a Malayalam film was ₹ 15 lakh at that time, making it the most-expensive Malayalam film made until then. When Padayottam was made only three Indian films had been blown up to 70 mm, with all of them processed in London. The film was photographed in CinemaScope format and was converted to 70 mm blow-up prints with 6-track magnetic stereo sound during post-production.

== Soundtrack ==
The music was composed by Guna Singh with lyrics by Kavalam Narayana Panicker.

No.	Song	Singers	Lyrics	Length
1	"Aazhikkange Karayundo"	K. J. Yesudas	Kavalam Narayana Panicker	
2	"Floating Castle Theme"	Prem Nazir	Music only	
3	"Nirathi Oro Karukkal"	Vani Jairam, Chorus	Kavalam Narayana Panicker	
4	"Thaatheyyathom"	Vani Jairam, Chorus	Kavalam Narayana Panicker	

== Reception ==
The film was released in India during the Onam festival of Kerala on 1 September 1982. It was a blockbuster at the box office and became the highest-grossing Malayalam film of the time. However, the film was not a profitable venture due to its high production costs.
