= List of silent films from South India =

A list of South Indian silent films made between 1916–1932.

== List ==
Year	Title	Production
1918	Keechaka Vadham	R. Nataraja Mudaliar
1918	Drowpathi Maana Samrakshanam	R. Nataraja Mudaliar
1918	Mailravanan (Maithreya Vijayam)	R. Nataraja Mudaliar
1919	Lava Kusa	R. Nataraja Mudaliar
1920	Kaalinga Marthanam	R. Nataraja Mudaliar
1921	Valli Thirumanam	Whitaker
1921	Rukmani Kalyanam	R. Nataraja Mudaliar
1921	Bhishma Pratigna	Ragupathi Surya Prakash
1923	Gajendra Moksham	Ragupathi Surya Prakash
1923	Baktha Nandanar	Ragupathi Surya Prakash
1923	Markandeya (Sivaleela)	R. Nataraja Mudaliar
1923	Samudra Madhanam	Ragupathi Surya Prakash
1924	Drowpathi Bagyam	Ragupathi Surya Prakash
1924	Vasantasena	Mohan Dayaram Bhavnani
1925	Mahatma Kabirdas	Ragupathi Surya Prakash
1926	Mohini Avataram	Ragupathi Surya Prakash
1926	Stage Girl	Ragupathi Surya Prakash
1927	Sri Kannika Parameswari	Surya Films
1927	Machavadharam	D.H. Hufton
1928	Bhaktha Kabirdas	D.H. Hufton
1930	Vigathakumaran	J. C. Daniel
1929	Dasavatharam	Ragupathi Surya Prakash
1929	Kovalan	Ragupathi Surya Prakash
1929	Kovalan (The Fatal Anklet)	A. Narayanan
1929	Dharmapathini	A. Narayanan
1930	Nandhanar (Elevation of the Downtrodden)	P. K. Raja Sandow
1930	Peyum Pennum	P. K. Raja Sandow
1930	Sri Valli Thirumanam	P. K. Raja Sandow
1930	Gnanasoundhari	A. Narayanan
1930	Garuda Garvabangam	A. Narayanan
1930	Lanka dahanam	R. Prakasa
1930	Pandava Nirvahana	Y.V. Rao
1930	Pandava Agyaatavasa	Y.V. Rao
1930	Sarangadhara	Y.V. Rao
1930	Gandhariyin pulambal	R. Prakasa
1930	The Heart of the Rajan	H. Desai
1930	Jeevana Gaana	G.B. Pawar
1930	Radha Shyam	Madhusudhan
1930	Vir Bhushan	K. Joshi
1930	Aawaris	Hiralal Bhatt
1930	Vipra Narayana	D.H. Hufton
1930	Raj Dharma	Mahavir Photoplace
1930	Ideal Woman	Mahavir Photoplace
1931	Pride Hindustan	P. K. Raja Sandow
1931	Anadhi Penn	P. K. Raja Sandow
1931	Usha Sundari	P. K. Raja Sandow
1931	Rajeswari	P. K. Raja Sandow
1931	Bhaktavatsala (Dhuruvanin Garvabangam)	P. K. Raja Sandow
1931	Mrchakatika	Mohan Dayaram Bhavnani
1931	Maarthandavarman	P. V. Rao
1931	Black Eagle	Hiralal Bhatt
1931	Kanamal pona kuzhandhai	H. Desai
1931	Pramila Arjun	S. Gopalan
1931	Bhoja Rajan	Y.V. Rao
1931	Pandava Angjada Vasam	Y.V. Rao
1931	Nara Narayana	Y.V. Rao
1931	Muthirai Modhiram	P.V. Rao
1931	Rose of Rajasthan	Ragupathi Surya Prakash
1931	Coral Queen	Ragupathi Surya Prakash
1931	Laila (Star of Mangralia)	Ragupathi Surya Prakash
1931	Sadharam	Ragupathi Surya Prakash
1931	Sadhi Kowsalya (The Birth of Ramachandra)	
1931	Avana Prema Kathe	Rafael Algoet
1931	Viswamithra	M. Seshayya
1931	Maya Madhusudhanan	M. Seshayya, Jiten Banerjee
1931	Rajalakshmi	Surya Films
1931	Red Archer	Surya Films
1931	Fidelity	Surya Films
1931	Virasimha	produced but unreleased
1931	Car Craze	T. Rangayya
1931	Kabirdas	T. Rangayya
1931	Kishora	T. Rangayya
1931	Machagandhi	T. Rangayya
1931	Hopla	T. Rangayya
1931	Rajdooth	H. Desai
1931	Bhaktha Sabhari	G.P. Pawar
1931	Sowhani Talwar	H. Desai
1931	Flogged into Love	H. Desai
1931	Royal Savage	H. Desai
1931	Song of Love	G.P. Pawar
1931	Raj Prabanch	H. Desai
1931	The Tyrant	H. Desai
1931	Hawk	H. Desai
1931	Koushanthi	H. Desai
1931	Stewart of Allah	H. Desai
1931	Nemesis of Lust	H. Desai
1931	Vijai Dhavni	H. Desai
1931	Wild Wolf	Surya Films
1931	Sabin Salekha	Suryaprakash Film Company
1931	Suryaprabha	Surya Films
1931	Dhoomakethu	Sundar Rao Nadkarni
1931	Discarded Love	Suryaprakash Film Company
1931	Martyr	Sundar Rao Nadkarni
1931	Gamble of Life	Baburao
1931	Hero of the wilds	T Prakash
1931	Jaw Breaker	
1931	Kidnapped Bride	V.K. Patil
1931	Thief of Iraq	K.P. Bhave
1932	Rajadhi Raja	
1932	Chota Chor	Surya Films
1932	Hari Maya	Mysore Films Company
1932	Inshakkins	Surya Films
1932	Kya Bath	National Pictures
1932	My Mother	National Pictures
1932	Sher Dhil	H. Desai
1932	Star of Asia	Surya Films
1932	Stunt King	Surya Films
1932	Sthri Sakthi	H. Desai
1932	Avenging Blood	Sri Ramesh Films
1932	The Undaunted	H. Desai
1932	Vishnu Leela	Ragupathi Surya Prakash
1932	Bhagyachakra	H. Desai
1933	Marthanda Varma	P. V. Rao
1987	Pushpaka Vimana	Shringar Nagaraj
2026	Gandhi Talks	Kishor Pandurang Belekar
