= P. K. Rosy =

Indian actress (1903–1988)

Poulose Kunji Rosy
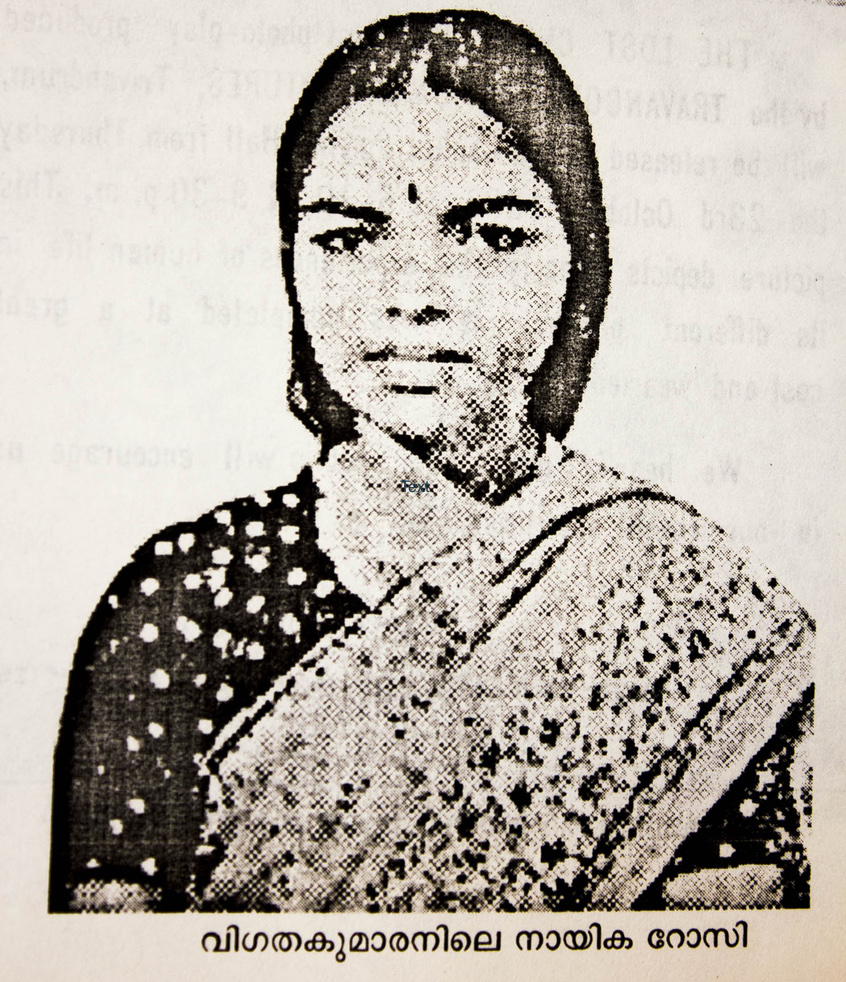
- Rosy in 1928
- Born: 10 February 1903; Thycaud, Trivandrum
- Died: 1988 (aged 84–85)
- Occupation: Actor
- Years active: 1928–1930
- Children: 2

Poulose Kunji Rosy (10 February 1903 – 1988), known as P. K. Rosy, was an Indian actress and the first woman to act in a Malayalam film. She starred in J. C. Daniel's silent film Vigathakumaran (The Lost Child), for which she was targeted at the 1928 (Note: Many sources cite the release date as 23 October 1930, a topic explored at length in an article by journalist Adv Narayan published in 2012. His view is that Chelangatt Gopalakrishnan's "meticulous research", putting the date at 7 November 1928, was lost after various sources, after an unverified copy of a handbill about the film, which came to light during the 8th International Film Festival of Kerala in 2003, giving the date as 23 October 1930. This was widely reported in the media, and was repeated by journalist Kunnukuzhi Mani. Many sources cite the 1928 release date. Kiran Ravindran, who made the documentary The Lost Child, asserts that Vigathakumaran was first released in 1928, not 1930.) premiere by an angry mob because of her lower-caste status. Celluloid shows Rosy being invited to see the film, Rosy went to the screening with a friend. An eminent lawyer of the time, Malloor Govinda Pillai (Forward Caste Nair), had come to inaugurate the film. “He said that I will not inaugurate this film until she (Rosy) is removed from here,” So Daniel asked her to watch the next show of the film instead.”

Born and raised as Rajamma in a Pulaya family, she developed an early interest in acting and began performing in local plays with the support of her uncle. In 1928, she was selected for the lead role in J. C. Daniel's debut film Vigathakumaran, in which she portrayed Sarojini, an upper-caste Nair woman. When the film premiered at the Capitol Theatre in Trivendrum, the upper-caste members of the audience expressed strong opposition to a Dalit portraying a Nair and a scene where the hero kisses a flower from her hair. The incident turned into violence, resulting in damage to the theatre and the arson of Rosy's house by a mob. Rosy was forced to leave the town and moving to Nagercoil in Tamil Nadu with a truck driver, where she changed her name to Rajammal. Her real name was probably Rajamma, but she has also been referred to by the name Rosamma.

Neither Rosy nor Daniel were recognised for the part they played in the development of Malayalam cinema for many decades, until the Kerala government instituted the J. C. Daniel Award in 1992. Official recognition for Rosy only came in 2015, with the establishment of the P.K. Rosy Smaraka Samithi (P.K. Rosy Memorial Committee). At least one book and several films have been dedicated to honouring her legacy. On 10 February 2023, Rosy was honoured with a Google Doodle, on the occasion of her 120th birthday.

== Early life ==
P. Kunji Rosy was born as Rajamma on 10 February 1903 at Trivandrum (now Thiruvananthapuram), in the then kingdom of Travancore (now the Indian state of Kerala), to a Pulaya family of grass cutters. Pulaya people were considered one of the lowest castes, and treated as slaves at that time, sold off with land and given harsh punishments for any transgressions. While some sources suggest that she was Christian, her family refutes this. Her mother’s name was Kunji, her sisters were Chellamma and Sarojini, and her brother was called Govindan – all traditional Hindu names.

There is some debate about Rosy's father, her religion, and the origin of her various names. Her father's name has been cited as both Naanan and Poulouse. Rosy is often represented as a Dalit Christian woman named Rosamma. However, according to journalist Kunnukuzhi Mani, who spoke to Rosy's family, her real name was Rajamma, and her family was Hindu. He says it was J. C. Daniel who changed her name to Rosy for his film. According to Mani, her father converted to Christianity when working for the London Missionary Society (LMS) in order for his daughter to be able to study at the church school, but the rest of the family continued to live as Hindus. Kiran Ravindran, who made the documentary The Lost Child, said that when her father converted to Christianity, his name became Paulose, and it is possible that he changed his daughter's name to Rosamma. Malayalam actor Madhu says that Rosy's father had died when she was young and that it was her stepfather who was Christian, and worked as a cook for the priests, and named her Rosamma, leading to her name change for the film. Madhu thinks that the whole family converted to Christianity, but for a short time only.

Rosy's love for acting seems to have surpassed concerns she may have held for what some elements of society would call her. She was supported by her uncle, a performing artist.

== Later life and marriage ==
Rosy married a Tamil truck driver called Keshava(n) Pillai, He was kicked out because he married her and they moved to Otapura Theruvu in Vadasery, Nagercoil, Tamil Nadu, where she started using the name "Rajammal". "Ammal" is a Tamil suffix denoting respect, usually used by higher-caste women in Tamil Nadu. Rosy nor her husband ever disclosed her past to anyone. They had children who were born with an upper-caste identity, which does not allow them to accept their Dalit heritage. Their daughter Padma, contacted in 2013 by a Malayalam TV channel, knew nothing of Rosy's acting career or her life before marriage. The BBC tried to contact her siblings in 2025, but their relatives said that they were "not comfortable with the attention".

== Career ==
With her uncle's support, Rosy moved into the field of performing arts, and was a popular performer in local plays, although it was very unusual for a Dalit woman to work in this field. By 1928, Rosy was performing the dance drama based on Hindu mythology, Kakkirasi (Kaakarashy). Before she started performing in it, only men performed in it. The Kakkarasi drama troupe and Rajah Party Drama Troupe competed with each other for Rosamma, and this competition enhanced the star value of the actress Rosamma. She also acted in other Tamil lower-caste performances.

After being spotted by the actor Johnson, who plays the villain in the film, After director JC Daniel's first choice of actress, Ms Lana from Mumbai, did not meet the requirements of the role, Rosy then stepped in to become the heroine of JC Daniel's silent film Vigathakumaran (The Lost Child), after his first prospective heroine proved unsuited for the role. She played the character of Sarojini, a Nair (upper-caste) woman, in the movie. She was paid five rupees a day, over the 10 days of filming, which was "a substantial amount of money" in those days.

The premiere of Vigathakumaran took place at the Capitol Theatre in Thiruvananthapuram, which is variously cited as occurring on 7 November 1928 and (probably erroneously) 23 October 1930. The theatre, usually a venue for stage plays, was attended by Rosy and her family. Upper-caste members of the audience were upset that the Pulaya (a Dalit caste) people were in the audience at all, and when they realised that Rosy was an actress in the film, the audience became an angry mob and damaged the screen and the theatre. Members of the Nair community were outraged to see a Dalit woman portray a Nair, and more so secondly by a scene in which the hero picks a flower from her hair and kisses it, and threw rocks at the screen. Eventually, both Daniel and Rosy had to flee the cinema, and Rosy had to leave her home town after her house was set on fire.

The film was later screened in Nagercoil, Kollam, Alappuzha, and other parts of Travancore, but Daniel was bankrupt, his career was ruined, and he never made another film.

== Death and legacy ==
Rosy died in 1988.

The story of the film was first rediscovered in the late 1960s by cinema historian and journalist Chelangatt Gopalakrishnan. In 1971, Kunnukuzhi Mani published his first article about her. Gopalakrishnan proved that Vigathakumaran was the first Malayalam feature film, with Daniel serving as director, producer, cinematographer, and lead actor. Gopalakrishnan wrote about both Rosy and Daniel for decades, striving to get their contributions recognised and their names honoured. However, there was a reluctance to do so. Malavika Binny, a professor of history at Kannur University in Kerala, said "the erasure of Rosy's legacy shows how deeply caste-based trauma can run".

In 2012 the chief minister of the state of Kerala, Oommen Chandy, suggested renaming the Best Film Actress award given annually by the Kerala State Chalachitra Academy, after P. K. Rosy. This was on the occasion of a pooja ceremony for the premiere of Kamal's film Celluloid. However, by February 2023 the academy had still not renamed the award. By contrast, the director Daniel, after much lobbying, finally had his name restored at the end of the 20th century. The Government of Kerala acknowledged Daniel as a resident of the city and officially conferred the title "Father of Malayalam Cinema" on him. In 1992, the state's Department of Cultural Affairs instituted the J. C. Daniel Award, part of the Kerala State Film Awards, to honour lifetime achievements in outstanding contributions to Malayalam cinema.

The P. K. Rosy Smaraka Samithi (P. K. Rosy Memorial Committee) was inaugurated by Cinema Minister Thiruvanchoor Radhakrishnan in 2015.

In 2018, the inaugural three-day film festival celebrating Dalit culture in Indian cinema was held by director Pa. Ranjith's Neelam Cultural Centre. This grew into a month-long celebration of Dalit culture and history, with the film festival named the P. K. Rosy Film Festival. Films are shown at the Prasad Lab Preview Theatre in Chennai. The festival took place from 2 to 4 April in 2025.

The Women in Cinema Collective (WCC), which has been striving to make the workspace better for women in cinema, launched a film society in tribute to P. K. Rosy in 2019, called the P. K. Rosy Film Society. Headed by an all-women panel of 11 women who are executive members of the WCC, the society aims to include all those who have been excluded from cinema history and industry because of their gender, class, religion, or caste. It is only the fourth all-women film society (out of a total of 170) in India, and the first to be run by women film professionals.

When Kani Kusruti was awarded Best Actress in Malayalam for her performance in Biriyaani in 2020, she dedicated the win to Rosy.

On 10 February 2023, Google honoured Rosy with a doodle, on the occasion of her 120th birthday.

== In popular culture ==
In 2008, a novel about Rosy called Nashtanaika, by Vinu Abraham, was published in Malayalam. It was translated into English by film critic and writer C. S. Venkiteswaran and professor of English and translator Arathy Ashok, and published by Speaking Tiger Books in 2020 as The Lost Heroine.

A documentary film about her life, Ithu Rosiyude Katha (This is Rosy's Story), directed by Kanjiramkulam Sanal, was released in 2011.

The Lost Child is a one-hour documentary film about both Daniel and Rosy directed by Kiran Ravindran, released in 2012.

Celluloid is a 2013 biopic about JC Daniel directed by Kamal. The film is partially based on Vinu Abraham's 2008 novel Nashtanaika, and also deals with the life of Rosy. Newcomer Chandni Geetha portrays her.

P. K. Rosy, written and directed by Sasi Nadukkadu and starring Bheeman Raghu as himself, along with well-known Malayalam actors Madhu, Jayan Cherthala, Urmila Unni, and Sethu Lakshmi, was released in 2022.

Swapnaayanam, directed by K. O. Akhil and starring Abhirami Bose as P. K. Rosy, is a narrative film that uses animation to show the development of Malayalam cinema, and honouring the role of Rosy. Its concluding scene "repositions Rosy as a cornerstone of Malayalam cinema's heritage". It was selected as the signature film of the 29th International Film Festival of Kerala in 2024.
