= Kakkarissi Natakam =

Form of folk art in Kerala, India

Kakkathis

Sundara Kakkan

Kakkarissi Natakam is a folk art form of dance drama which includes music, originating in southern India, in the states of Kerala and Tamil Nadu. It is especially associated with Kerala.

== History ==
Kakkarissi Natakam originated in southern Kerala and Tamil Nadu. At first, the natakam would only be performed in front of minor Hindu deities, and audiences were mainly drawn from lower socio-economic classes and various lower castes. Performances were long, often lasting through much of the night.

== Description ==
Kakkarissi Nadakam

This art form is more popular in the southern regions of Kerala. It is a form of musical drama, and the language used is a blend of Tamil and Malayalam. It has all the elements of traditional Indian theatre, and combines music, dance, and mime. The performances are often humorous, and blend satire and social commentary into the narrative. A play is performed with dance and songs, accompanied by musical instruments which include the mrudangam, harmonium, ganchira, chenda and kaimani.

The story is built around Lord Shivan with his consort Parvathi Devi, who arrived on earth in the form of Kakkalan and Kakkathi, a nomadic tribe of fortune tellers. Sundara Kakkan, Kakkathis, Vedan, and Thampuraan are some of the main characters in this art form.

== Notable practitioners ==
P. K. Rosy, the first actress in a Malayalam film, was an accomplished Kakkarissi Natakam performer in the 1920s, before she played the lead role in J. C. Daniel's 1928 film Vigathakumaran.

Sreedharan Asan (born c. 1923), studied under Gopalan Asan, becoming a well-known artist and teacher of Kakkarissi Natakam. He led his own troupe, called Natana Kairali. When Travancore was a kingdom ruled by a Maharaja, the troupe performed for him at the "vetta and vilakku" festival of the Padmanabhaswamy Temple, dedicated to Vishnu, in Thiruvananthapuram. They also performed at the World Malayalam Conference, and in Delhi, for Indira Gandhi as well as Rajiv Gandhi. At the age of 89, Sreedharan Asan was feted by the Soorya Stage and Film Society, which organised a pooja for him. In 2011, he won a Kerala Sangeetha Nataka Akademi Award in the folk art (Keraleeya Kalakal) category.

== Writing ==
G. Bhargavan Pillai, a writer on Kerala folklore, published his work about the art form, titled Kakkarissinatakam, in 1976.
