= Marthanda =

Marthanda may refer to one of the following:

- Mārtanda, a solar deity in Hinduism
- Marthanda Varma (disambiguation)
- Martanda Bhairava Tondaiman, ruler of the Indian princely state of Pudukkottai
- Marthanda Perumal Pararajasekaran III (Marthanda Perumal), a ruler of Sri Lanka (see also Jaffna Kingdom)
- Marthanda, a fictional character in the Indian Baahubali franchise

== See also ==
- Marthandam, a town in Tamil Nadu, India
