= Vinu Abraham =

Indian writer

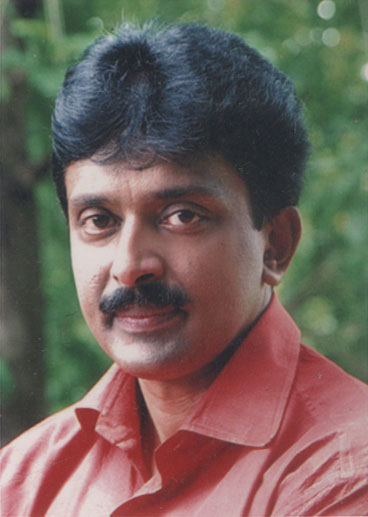
- Born: Nedungadappally
- Writing career
- Language: Malayalam
- Notable work: Nashtanayika
- Notable awards: Best Screenplay, Mexico City International Film Festival

Vinu Abraham, is an Indian short story writer, novelist, and script writer, who writes in Malayalam. He is best known for his 2008 novel Nashtanayika, about Malayam actress PK Rosy, later translated as The Lost Heroine.

== Early life ==
Vinu Abraham is from Nedungadappally, near Thiruvalla in Pathanamthitta district of the south Indian state of Kerala.

== Career ==
Abraham is based in Thiruvananthapuram, the capital city of Kerala. His short stories and articles appear regularly in Malayalam periodicals in Kerala. He has published many books as well as writing screenplays for seven films including Ravu.

Nashtanayika (2008), his most famous novel, depicts the saga of the tragic life of Malayalam cinema's first heroine, Dalit actress P.K.Rosy, and the making of the first Malayalam film, Vigathakumaran, directed by JC Daniel. The 2013 Malayalam film Celluloid, directed by Kamal and starring Pritviraj, Mamta Mohandas, and Chandni Geetha as Rosy, is a partial adaptation of Nashtanaayika. It was translated into English by film critic and writer C. S. Venkiteswaran and professor of English and translator Arathy Ashok, and published by Speaking Tiger Books in 2020 as The Lost Heroine.

Abraham wrote the screenplay for Parudeesa, which won the Best Dramatic Editing award at Amsterdam International Film Festival, and Best Screenplay at Mexico City International Film Festival.
