= Valli Thirumanam =

Valli Thirumanam may refer to:

- Valli Thirumanam (film)
- Valli Thirumanam (TV series)
