= Mankuzhipadi =

Village in Pathanamthitta District, Kerala, India

Mankuzhipadi is a small place between Mallappally and Nedungadappally in Kerala, India. One can see several beautiful houses around this place. A unit of Kerala Khadi & Village Industries Board is located here. This unit provides training to potential entrepreneurs in various sectors including weaving and spinning, pottery, bee keeping and a host of other activities. Its office is located next to Maruthoor Blooms Cottage.

From Nedungadappally Junction to Mallapally Junction there were a few small junctions from north to south in Changanacherry Mallapally PWD road, presently the State Highway. They were 1. Mattattipadi, where the present YMCA is situated, from where a deviation goes to Pathicad, 2 Mankuzhipadi, from where a deviation goes to Chengaroor, 3. Aasupathripadi, from where a deviation goes to Kaipatta to west and Manjathanam to East, 4. Pandiyalappadi, from where a deviation goes to Manjathanam, 5. Valakuzhypadi from where a deviation goes to Kaipatta. This has been the unwritten location chart of the common man of 19th century. Small traders used these junctions for trading and transportation of agricultural and hill produces to Changanacherry Market
