= Lip kiss =

Kiss between two people by their lips

The lip kiss, kiss on the lips, lip to lip kiss, oral kiss, mouth to mouth kiss, osculation, or making out is a type of kiss between two people by their lips. It has different meanings in different cultures. In Western culture, it can be performed between two friends or family. This move aims to express affection for a friend, whereas in Middle Eastern and South Asian culture, it is regarded as sexual affection. In some cultures, a friendly kiss has no sexual connotation unlike kissing for love.

== History and culture ==
Lip kissing, known more technically as osculation (osculate, meaning to touch, from the Latin "osculum", meaning kiss) is not universal. It is not common in the traditional cultures of China or Japan. The lip kiss is said to have been invented by the people of ancient India, although the earliest Indian records—about 2000 B.C.—indicate that their prior custom was a nose or "sniff" kiss. By the time the famous Indian manual of sex and love—the Kama Sutra—was written in the fourth century, the lip kiss was well established. The practice of kissing with the lips spread westward to Persia, Syria, Greece, Italy, and eventually to the countries that make up Northern Europe. The kiss on the lips is a practice that can be found in the time of patriarchs (Bible). In Ancient Greece, the kiss on the mouth was used to express a concept of equality between people of the same rank. In the Middle Ages, the kiss of peace was recommended by the Catholic Church. The kiss on the lips was also common among knights.

The gesture has again become popular with young people, particularly in England.

=== Middle East ===
There are also taboos as to whom one can kiss in some Muslim-majority societies governed by religious law. In the Islamic Republic of Iran, a man who kisses or touches a woman who is not his wife or relative can be punished such as getting whipped up to 100 times or even go to jail.

Research from May 2023 found texts from ancient people in Mesopotamia that indicates that kissing was a well-established practice 4500 years ago. According to Dr Troels Pank Arbøll, one of the authors of this study:

"In ancient Mesopotamia, which is the name for the early human cultures that existed between the Euphrates and Tigris rivers in present-day Iraq and Syria, people wrote in cuneiform script on clay tablets. Many thousands of these clay tablets have survived to this day, and they contain clear examples that kissing was considered a part of romantic intimacy in ancient times, just as kissing could be part of friendships and family members' relations."

=== South Asia ===
On-screen lip-kissing was not a regular occurrence in Hindi cinema until the 1990s, although it has been present from the time of the inception of Hindi cinema. This can appear contradictory since the culture of kissing is believed to have originated and spread from India.

== Types ==
=== Non-sexual kiss ===
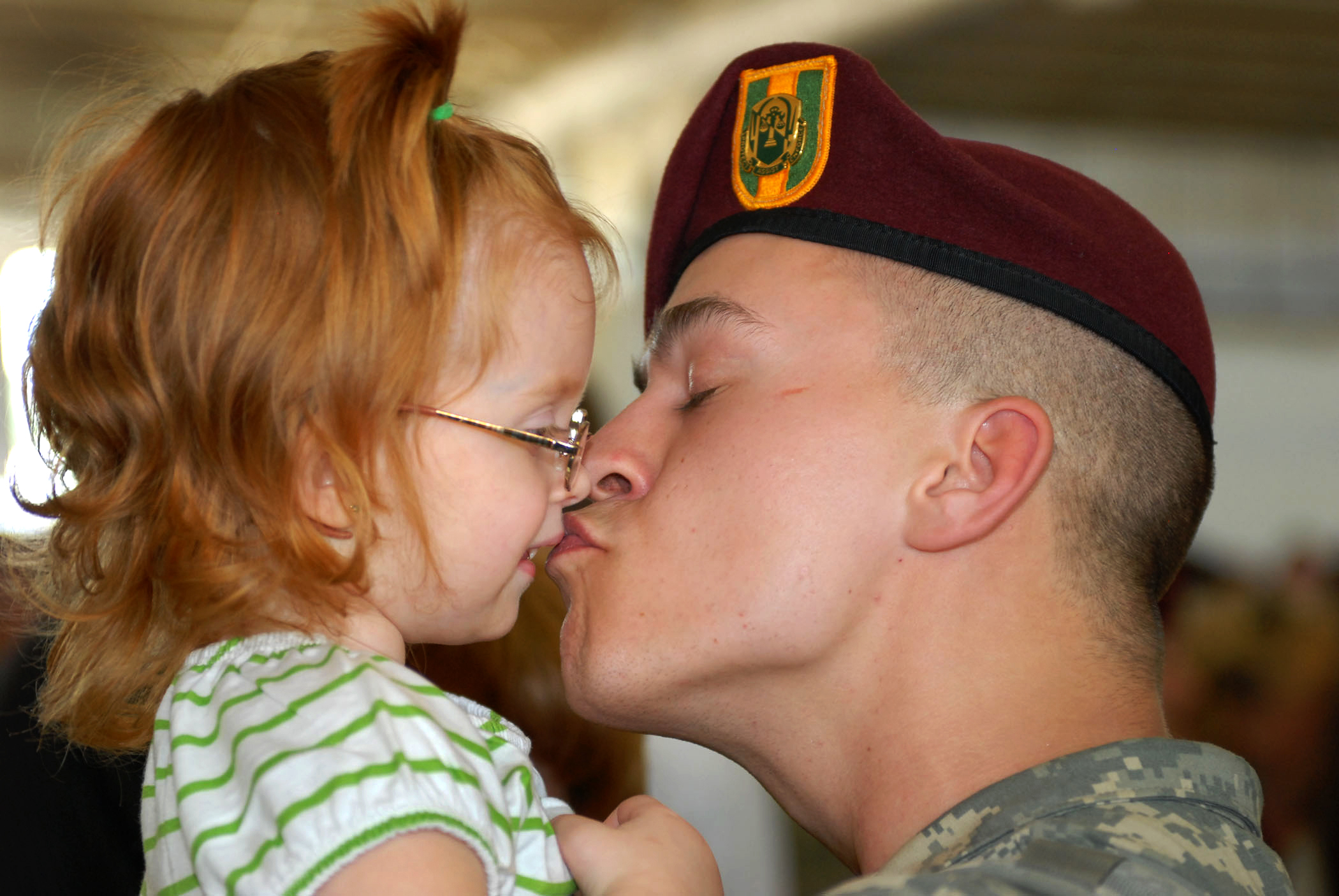
A military policeman kisses his daughter for the first time after a 15-month deployment.

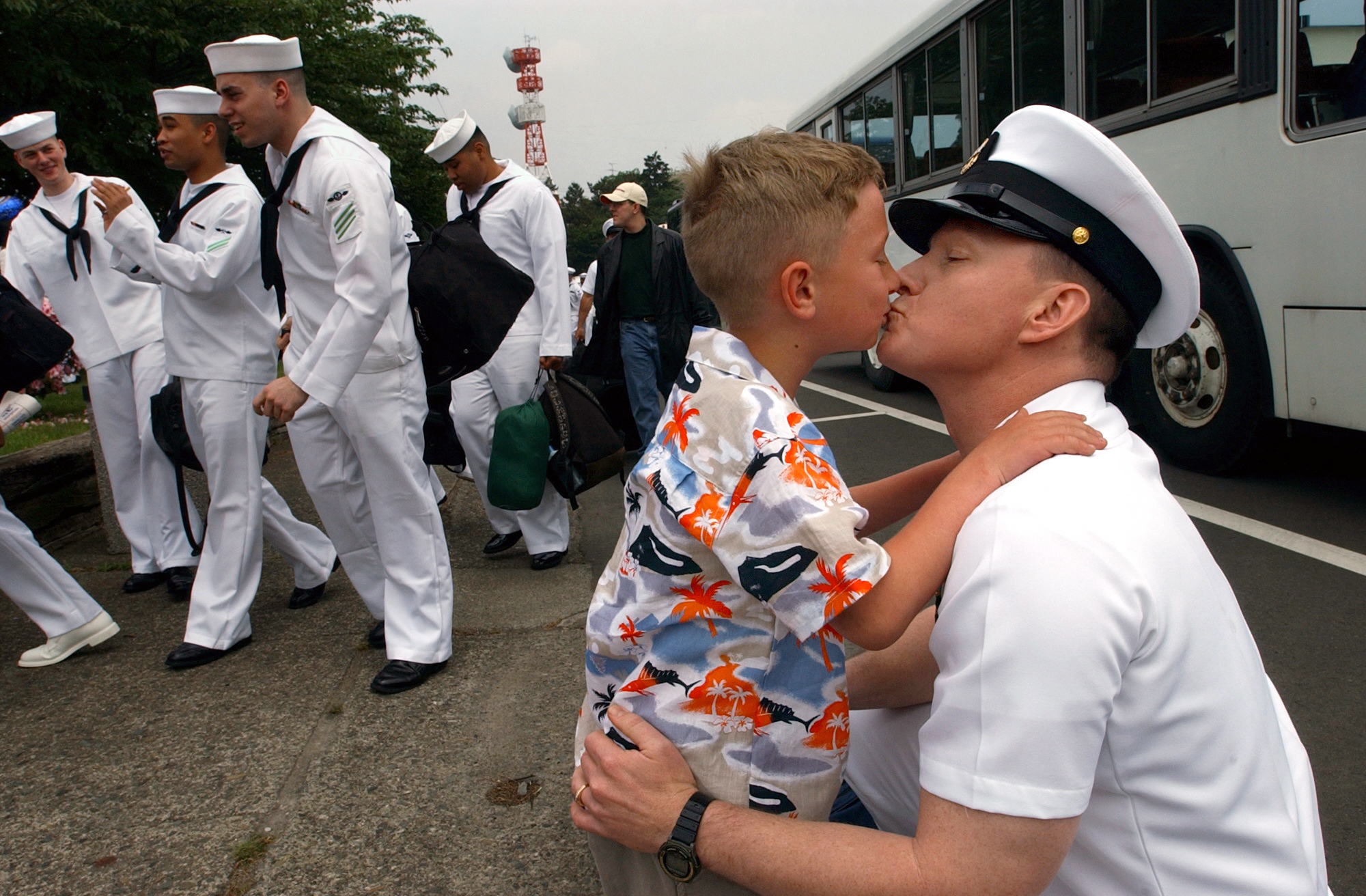
US Naval Officer's son welcomes his dad back from operation with a kiss

In 2002, Abdullah bin Abdul Aziz kissed George W. Bush on his lips as a sign of welcome in his visit.

=== French kiss ===
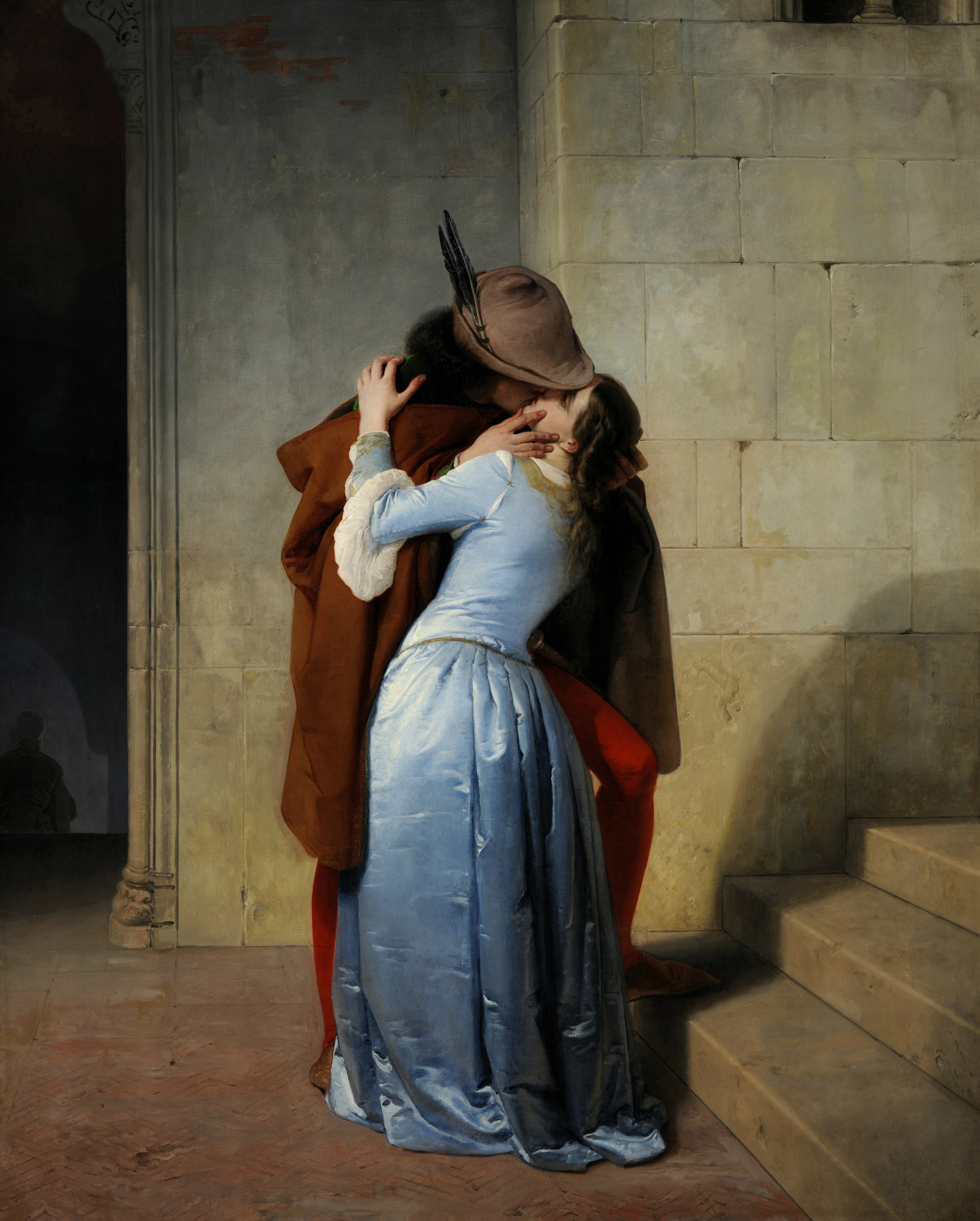
The Kiss by Francesco Hayez (1859)

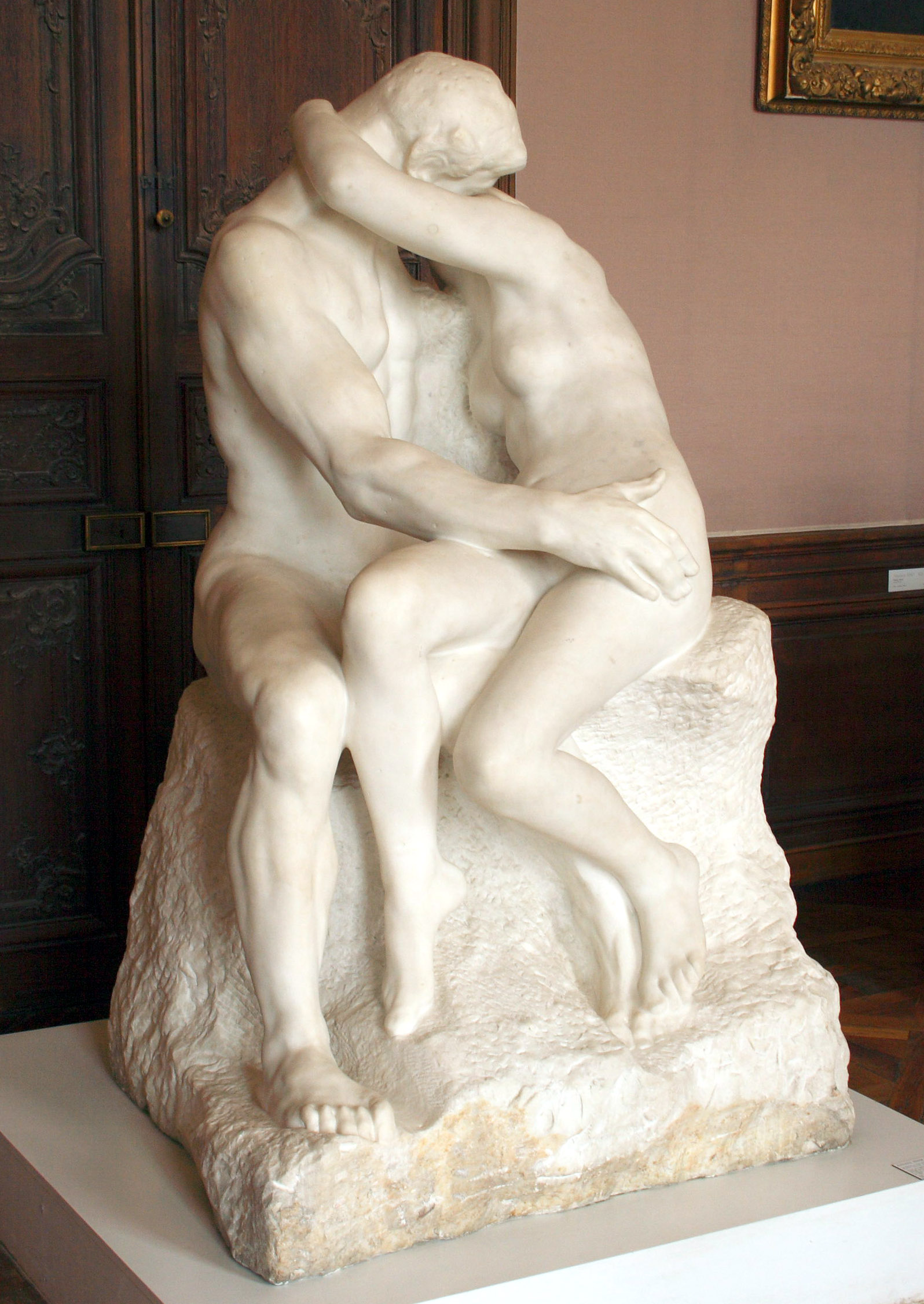
Le Baiser ("The Kiss") by Auguste Rodin (1882)

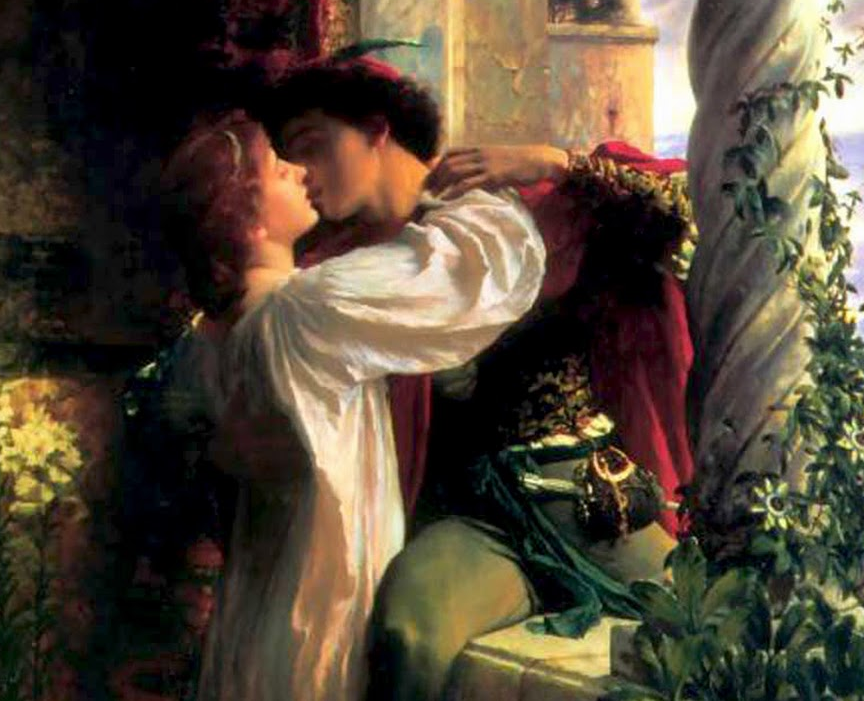
Romeo and Juliet by Sir Frank Dicksee (1884)

A French kiss, also known as cataglottism or a tongue kiss, is an amorous kiss in which the participants' tongues extend to touch each other's lips or tongue. A kiss with the tongue stimulates the partner's lips, tongue and mouth, which are sensitive to the touch and induce sexual arousal. The sensation when two tongues touch—also known as tongue touching—has been proven to stimulate endorphin release and reduce acute stress levels. Extended French kissing may be part of making out. The term originated at the beginning of the 20th century, in America and Great Britain, as the French had acquired a reputation for more adventurous and passionate sex practices.

French kissing may be a mode for disease transmission, particularly if there are open wounds.

== Biology and evolution ==
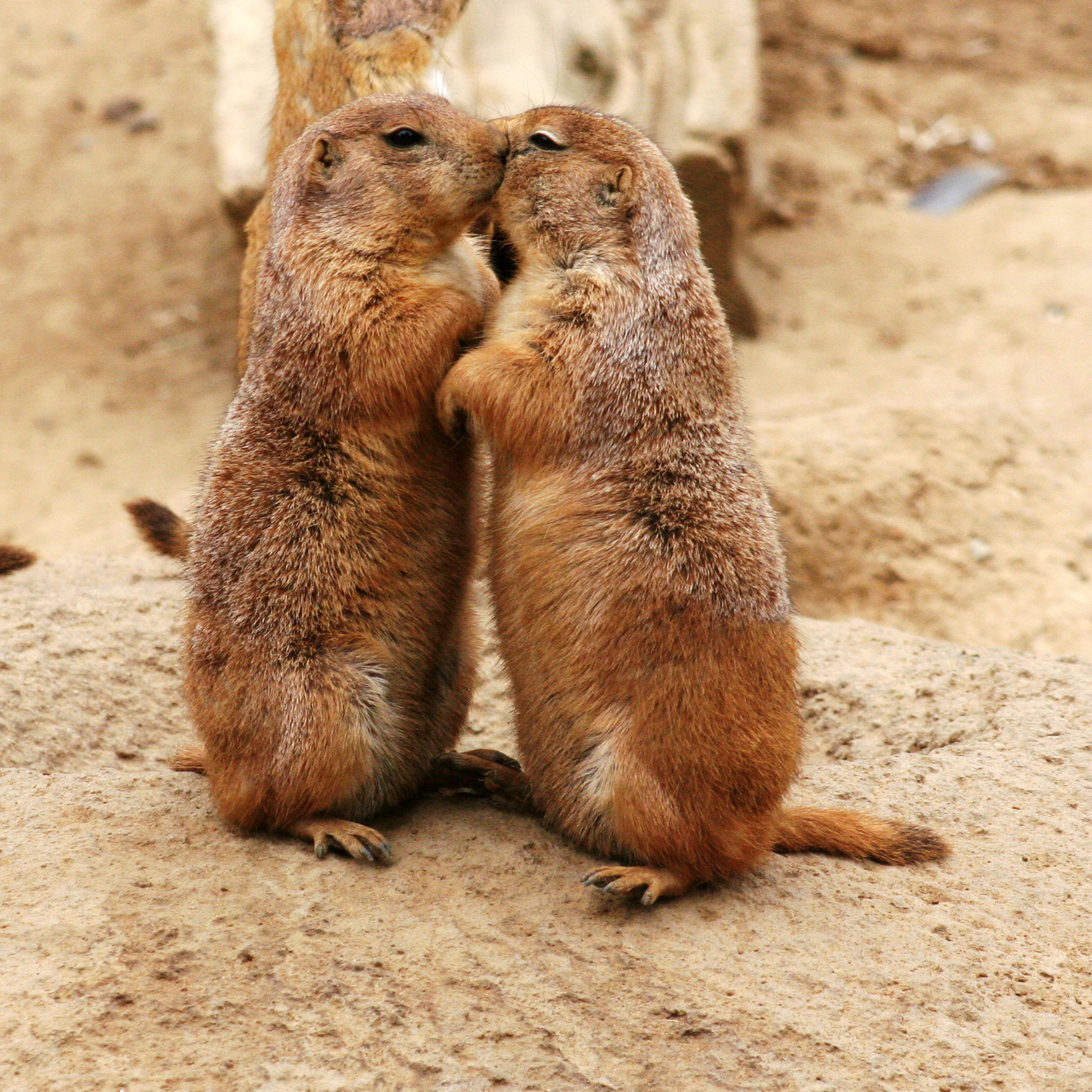
Black-tailed prairie dogs "kissing." Prairie dogs use a nuzzle of this variety to greet their relatives.

Within the natural world of other animals, there are numerous analogies to kissing, notes Crawley, such as "the billing of birds, the cataglottism of pigeons and the antennal play of some insects." Even among mammals such as the dog, cat and bear, similar behavior is noted.
