= Marthanda Varma (film) =

1933 Malayalam movie

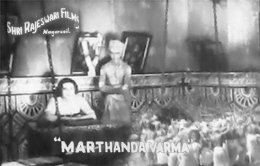
- Directed by: P. V. Rao
- Written by: P. V. Rao (screenplay)
- Based on: Marthandavarma by C. V. Raman Pillai
- Produced by: R. Sunder Raj
- Starring: Jaidev; A. V. P. Menon; Devaki; Padmini
- Cinematography: Pandurang E. Naik
- Distributed by: Shri Rajeshwari Films
- Release date: 12 May 1933 (Trivandrum)
- Running time: 118 mins.
- Country: India
- Languages: Silent film with intertitles in English and Malayalam

Marthanda Varma, also written Maarthandavarma, is a 1933 black and white Indian silent film directed by P. V. Rao, based on the 1891 Malayalam novel by C. V. Raman Pillai. This was the first film based on Malayalam literature and the second film of the Malayalam film industry after Vigathakumaran.

== Plot ==
Based on the novel Marthandavarma, the film recounts the adventures of the Crown Prince, Marthanda Varma, and how he eliminates his arch rivals one by one, so as to ascend to the throne of the Kingdom of Travancore.

== Cast ==
Marthanda Varma Film

The cast includes: (Note: The casting credits are contradicted in the sources. The character Marthanda Varma is attributed to the actor Jaidev in IMDb, whereas in Weblokam (Malayalam Webdunia), the same character is attributed to actor Andi, who is referred to as a Tamil from Thalassery. The possibility of the name Jaidev being the screen alias of Andi conflicts with the information in Cini Diary, where both the names are listed separately under the artist credits of the movie. Weblokam further states that Tamil actresses Pattamal and Devaki Bhai donned the roles of Subadra and Sulaikha respectively, of which the former's character credit brings up another contradiction as Cini Diary states Pattamal is Padmini or rather Pattamal's screen alias is Padmini, who is attributed to the character Parukutty in IMDb.)

- Jaidev
- Andi
- A. V. P. Menon as Anantha Padmanaban
- V. Naik as Padmanabhan Thampi
- Padmini
- Devaki
- V. C. Kutty
- S. V. Nath
- Sundaram Iyer
- A. P. Padmanabha Menon
- Pattammal
- Pious
- R. Sunder Raj as Bheeram Khan
- Kesava Menon
- Thilakam

== Production ==
The film was written and directed by P. V. Rao, while R. Sunder Raj, (Note: Friend of JC Daniel. Also referred to as R. Sundararaj, Sunder Raj, or Sundar Raj.) who also acted in the film, was producer. Cinematography was by Pandurang E. Naik (also written P. E. Nayik) The film was produced by Raj under the banner of Shri Rajeswari Films and production of the film was started in 1931, during which the producer ignored the queries regarding the copyright of the novel related to adapting it to the film. A. Devaraj was the film's editor.

The film had title cards in English and Malayalam, some of which were taken from the original text. A few of the title cards and actions make reference to the Swadeshi movement. The film also featured with a seven-minute actual newsreel footage of temple procession of the late Sri. Chithira Thirunal, last Maharaja of Travancore.

== Release ==
The movie was released through Shri Rajeswari Films in 1933 at Capitol theatre, Thiruvananthapuram of Thiruvithaankoor. The movie ran into copyright problems during its release with the publishers of the novel in that period, Kamalalaya Book Depot and was withdrawn from screenings after its opening day, following a court order marking the first copyright case in the Indian film industry and literature publishing of Kerala. The print of film was under the custody of Kamalalaya Book Depot until 1974, when the National Film Archive of India negotiated and acquired it.

This film is said to show the first lip kiss of Indian cinema.

A print of film, which as of 2001 was the only silent film of south India fully available, is preserved at the National Film Archive of India in Pune. The film was shown at the 1994 Film Festival of Kerala. In 2011, it was screened at the Filka International Film Festival in Thiruvananthapuram.

== See also ==
- Marthandavarma, a novel by C. V. Raman Pillai
