= Celluloid (film) =

2013 film directed by Kamal

- Theatrical release poster
- Directed by: Kamal
- Written by: Kamal
- Based on: Life of J. C. Daniel by Chelangatt Gopalakrishnan; Nashta Naayika by Vinu Abraham
- Produced by: Kamal; Mohamed Ubaidh
- Starring: Prithviraj Sukumaran; Sreenivasan; Mamta Mohandas; Nedumudi Venu; Chandni
- Cinematography: Venu
- Edited by: K. Rajagopal
- Music by: M. Jayachandran
- Production company: Prime Time Cinema
- Distributed by: Murali Films
- Release date: 15 February 2013
- Running time: 129 minutes
- Country: India
- Language: Malayalam

Celluloid is a 2013 Indian Malayalam-language biographical drama film co-produced, written, and directed by Kamal. It stars Prithviraj Sukumaran, Sreenivasan, Mamta Mohandas, and Chandni. The film is based on the life of J.C. Daniel, regarded as the father of Malayalam cinema, focusing on the making of his film Vigathakumaran, and the story of its heroine, P. K. Rosy. The film is particularly based on Life of J. C. Daniel, a biography of J. C. Daniel written by Chelangatt Gopalakrishnan. Filming began in November 2012, and the online posters, created by a 16-year-old boy, Aswin, which went viral on social media. Released in February 2013, the film received positive reviews and won seven Kerala State Film Awards, including Best Film and Best Actor (Prithviraj). It was also supported by All Lights Film Services (ALFS), a leading film festival consultancy and become a box-office success.

== Synopsis ==
Celluloid tells the tale of J. C. Daniel and his love for cinema. He goes to great lengths to get the equipment required to make a movie, writes numerous letters, visits places, and meets Dadasaheb Phalke, the man who brought cinema to India. Getting an actress to act in his movie was a tough task. It is decided that Rosamma, later named as P K Rosy, will play the lead role in J. C. Daniel's revolutionary 'motion picture' venture, Vigathakumaran, the story of which J. C. Daniel himself conceived. He sells everything to make his dream a reality, further borrowing money to meet the expenses. When Vigathakumaran is finally screened at Capitol Theatre, a 'cinemapura', the upper caste members of the audience create a ruckus over a lower-caste girl acting as a Nair lady. Rosie, hunted by the Madambis, leaves town never to be seen again. Years later, the shriveled, impoverished Daniel, with only his wife, Janet, by his side, is leading a life far removed from what he had envisaged. Chelangatt Gopalakrishnan's interest in Daniel's life, his efforts to give him his due, and the flashbacks to the incidents in his life post Vigathakumaran form the rest of the movie.

== Cast ==
- Prithviraj Sukumaran in a dual role as:
  - J.C. Daniel (Father)
  - Harris Daniel (Son)
- Sreenivasan as Chelangatt Gopalakrishnan
- Mamta Mohandas as Janet
- Chandni Geetha as Rosy
- T.G. Ravi as Sundaraj
  - Sreejith Ravi as Young Sundaraj
- Jayaraj Century as Johnson
- Nedumudi Venu as Subramaniam
- Sruthi Dilip as Lana
- Siddique as Ramakrishna Iyer (I. A. S)
- Irshad
- Thampi Antony
- Ramesh Pisharody as Pillai
- Nandu Madhav as Dadasaheb Phalke
- Madhan Bob as P. U. Chinnappa
- Thalaivasal Vijay as R. Nataraja Mudaliar
- Jayaraj Warrier
- Manikandan Pattambi
- Chembil Asokan as Paulose
- László Pere as the Cinematographer
- Bhagyalakshmi (Cameo appearance in Climax scene)

== Production ==
Prithviraj was selected to play the lead role in this film. It was then reported that Samvrutha Sunil will be playing the role of Janet, the wife of J.C. Daniel, which was supposed to be her last film before her marriage. But later, Mamta Mohandas replaced her. Chandni, a singer who shot to fame through the reality show Josco Indian Voice, was selected to play the role of P. K. Rosie, Malayalam cinema's first heroine. The character of Dada Phalke was given to actor Nandu Madhav who had done the same role for the 2009 Marathi film Harishchandrachi Factory (which itself dealt with the struggles in making the first Indian feature film Raja Harishchandra by Dada Phalke) Sreenivasan enacts the role of Chelangatt Gopalakrishnan who worked and lobbied tirelessly to give Daniel his due in Kerala. The online posters for the film were done by sixteen-year-old boy, Aswin K. S., which was selected for promotion and wiki updates. 'Celluloid' is the first film to have the youngest publicity designer.

The film was shot at Thiruvananthapuram and Mysore. It was dubbed into Tamil as J. C. Daniel and released in August 2013.

== Soundtrack ==
M. Jayachandran's soundtrack has been well appreciated by critics and audiences alike. "Enundodee", a song which is a throwback to the yesteryears, rendered by Sithara became a hit on TV and internet. The song "Katte Katte" sung by Vaikom Vijayalakshmi and G. Sreeram has also been termed a hit. Engandiyoor Chandrasekharan and Rafeeq Ahammed penned lyrics for the songs.

Track list
No.	Title	Lyrics	Singer(s)	Length
1.	"Enundodi"	Engandiyoor Chandrasekharan	Sithara	4:00
2.	"Katte Katte"	Rafeeq Ahammed	G. Sreeram, Vaikom Vijayalakshmi	4:00

== Festival screenings ==
The film was an official selection for the following film festivals:

- Indian Film Festival Japan – International Competition section.
- Indian Film Festival of Houston – International Competition section.
- Bollywood Film Festival Norway – International Competition section.
- ImagineIndia International Film Festival Madrid
- New Generation Film Festival
- Pune International Film Festival India
- Jaipur International Film Festival India
- International Sport Film Festival Italy
- Queens World Film Festival, USA
- ReelWorld Film Festival, Toronto, Canada
- International Film Festival for Comedy Romance and Musical Film Festival, Indonesia 2013
- 6th Nashik International Film Festival 2014
- Columbia George International Film Festival, USA 2014

== Accolades ==
In the 2012 National Film Awards, Celluloid won the National Film Award for Best Feature Film in Malayalam.

In the Kerala State Film Awards, it won:

- 2012 Kerala State Film Award for Best Film
- 2012 Kerala State Film Award for Best Actor – Prithviraj
- 2012 Kerala State Film Award for Best Music Director – M. Jayachandran
- 2012 Kerala State Film Award for Best Singer – Sithara Krishnakumar (Song : Enundodee Ambilichantham)
- 2012 Kerala State Film Award for Best Costume Designer – S. B. Satheesh
- 2012 Kerala State Film Award for Best Art Director – Suresh Kollam
- 2012 Kerala State Film Awards Special Jury Mention – G. Sreeram, Vaikom Vijayalakshmi – 'Katte Katte Nee' Song

== Critical reception ==
Aswin Kumar of The Times of India gave 3.5 stars out of 5 and said "Celluloid, a moving tribute to Malayalam cinema from director Kamal is touching, poetic and immensely powerful. On a sprawling canvas, Kamal diligently recreates an age and fills it with characters who go on to become iconic figures in the history of Malayalam cinema. Prithviraj can hold this role close to his heart, so can Mamta. The dialect of Prithviraj may seem a bit jarring at times. But he masks it with an over-powering rendition of a character that transforms from youth to an ageing, frail, defeated soul."

Paresh C Palicha of Rediff.com said "In Celluloid Kamal shows what 'passion for cinema' really meant before it became a stylish thing to say. Prithviraj is good and consistent as Daniel. Chandni gives a lifelike performance as Rosy with stars in her eyes."

== Controversies ==
The film allegedly contains derogatory remarks on the renowned writer and civil servant Malayatoor Ramakrishnan and former Kerala Chief Minister K. Karunakaran which sparked off a controversy in Kerala. Karunakaran is not openly mentioned but Malayattoor is being portrayed as a casteist who never wanted a Nadar to be given the title as the father of Malayalam cinema. This was followed by a controversial interview by Kamal in which he stated that Karunakaran and Malayatoor Ramakrishnan had roles in denying justice to J. C. Daniel by not recognising him as the father of Malayalam cinema. Kamal had pointed out in the interview that actor Siddique's character in the film essayed Malayatoor Ramakrishnan and he deliberately avoided mentioning the names of Karunakaran and Malayatoor to avoid controversies.

The row over the film continued to be in the headlines for over a week with various writers, politicians, and cultural icons commenting on the issue. "My father was the one who did all he could for the benefit of Malayalam movies, and even thought of a film studio in the state capital and instituting pensions for the film fraternity. A thousand Kamals cannot tarnish his image", K. Muraleedharan, Karunakaran's son, said on the portrayal of his father as a villain. But he after seeing the movie said that there was nothing about Karunakaran in the film and this ended the controversy.

== See also ==
- Harishchandrachi Factory
