= Valli Thirumanam (film) =

- Directed by: P. V. Rao
- Produced by: Samikannu Vincent
- Starring: T. P. Rajalakshmi
- Release date: 1933
- Country: India
- Language: Tamil

Valli Thirumanam (transl. Valli's wedding) is a 1933 Indian Tamil-language film.

== Cast ==
- T. P. Rajalakshmi

== Soundtrack ==
.

Track listing
No.	Title	Length
