= T. P. Rajalakshmi =

First film heroine of south India (1911–1964)

Kalaimamani T. P. Rajalakshmi
- டி. பி. ராஜலட்சுமி
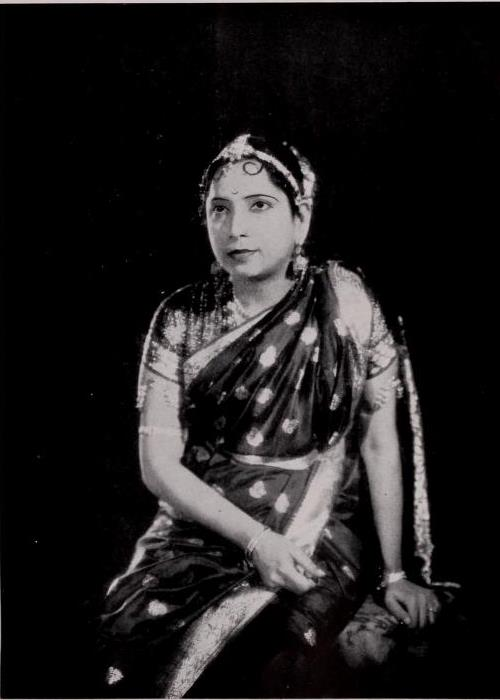
- Rajalaksmi as Yashoda in Nandakumar (1938)
- Born: Thiruvaiyaru Panchapakesa Rajalakshmi; 11 November 1911; Saliamangalam, Tanjore District, Madras Presidency, British India (now Thanjavur district, Tamil Nadu, India)
- Died: 20 August 1964 (aged 52)
- Other name: Cinema Rani TPR
- Occupation: Actress · Filmmaker · Singer · Producer · Screenwriter · Music director · Social reformer
- Years active: 1929–1964
- Known for: First Tamil & Telugu film heroine; first South Indian female director
- Movement: Dravidian movement
- Spouse: T. V. Sundaram
- Children: Kamala Mony

Thiruvaiyaru Panchapakesa Rajalakshmi (11 November 1911 – 1964), popularly known as "Cinema Rani TPR", was an Indian actress, filmmaker, singer, producer & social reformist. She is the first Tamil and Telugu film heroine, the first South Indian female director, screenplay writer, singer, music director and producer. She supported the Dravidian movement and was closely associated with Dravidian leaders.

Her work Miss Kamala was a revolutionary movie that conveyed a strong woman equality message to society. It made Rajalakshmi the first Tamil feature film director, the first female director in South India, and the second in India after Fatma Begum. In addition to producing and directing the film, she wrote, edited and composed the music for the film.

Rajalakshmi was the first heroine in the South Indian Cinemas to have had a fan club.

Rajalakshmi was awarded the Kalaimamani award in 1964.

== Early life ==
Rajalakshmi was born on 11 November 1911 in Saliamangalam, a village near present-day Thanjavur, Tamil Nadu. She was married at the age of 11, but the marriage reportedly did not last. Due to her family's reported inability to pay the dowry, Rajalakshmi was sent back to her mother's house just a few days after the marriage commenced. Rajalakshmi and her parents then reportedly moved to Trichy in poverty.

Even as a child, Rajalakshmi is said to have shown promise in singing and acting. She could quickly learn and sing any kind of song, and instantly act out stories she observed. This special quality of Rajalakshmi was reportedly recognized by Sankaradas Swamigal, and she joined his drama troupe. Rajalakshmi went on to reportedly perform the lead role in Pavalakkodi and other stage plays produced by Sankaradas Swamigal.

At the age of 20, Rajalakshmi fell in love and married her co-star T. V. Sundaram. T.P. Rajalakshmi gave birth in 1936 to her only biological child, a daughter named Kamala. T. P. Rajalakshmi also directed a film named Miss Kamala and inaugurated the birth year of her daughter Kamala. The movie Miss Kamala turned out to be a hit of those days and Rajalakshmi was a leading star of those days, which made the people to expect and wait anxiously for her upcoming movies. Rajalakshmi established her own production company named "Sri Rajam Talkies" and she produced her films from her own production company- Rajam Talkies.

Rajalakshmi acted in several stage plays showing protest against the British government, who ruled India in those days, which led to Rajalakshmi being imprisoned several times by the British Government.

In addition, Rajalakshmi supported & took care of several people who came seeking help. Rajalakshmi's house was always filled with people who came in search of help. Rajalakshmi encouraged everyone to stay with her in her house as a family. Rajalakshmi was a role model for the people of those days and she initiated social awareness to fight against the female child assassination and to fight for the freedom of the nation through her lifestyle that she led.

Rajalakshmi was well appreciated by leaders of the Dravidian movement. 'Periyar' E. V. Ramasamy (president of the Dravidar Kazhagam) visited Rajalakshmi at her home in Rajarathinam street and appreciated her contributions to the society. Periyar also used to address Rajalakshmi as Thangachi (transl. "younger sister"), according to Kamala -daughter of Rajalakshmi- in one of the press interviews.

Rajalakshmi owned several properties at Kilpauk and became a wealthy woman. She resided at the Palace house, that she purchased at the very first. TPR also permitted her brothers and their families too to reside at her palace "Raj Mahal" that was located at No. 1 Rajarathnam street. soon after, she owned several properties in Rajarathnam Street and Professor Subramanian street Vasu Street etc. at Kilpauk. As a wealthy woman, she continued her roles in several films and she had a strong welcome by the people for her movies and songs. Indhiya Thaai was her last film.

== Stage career ==
In order to support her family, Rajalakshmi joined a drama troupe and acted in stage plays. She learnt dance and music from Sankaradas Swamigal, a popular dramatist. Rajalakshmi got her big break in 1931, when she was cast as the heroine in the first Tamil talkie, Kalidas. Later on, Rajalakshmi turned out to be the star cast of those days. Many directors and producers requested Rajalakshmi to provide her call sheet for the upcoming films.

She was honored with the title "Cinema Rani" and later, she was awarded the "Kalaimamani" award (1961–62) for her excellence towards the Cine Industry, for which Dr. M.G. Ramachandran, who later became the Chief Minister, honoured T. P. Rajalakshmi by sending his own car to Rajalakhmi's house in order to invite the pioneer to the venue, where Rajalakshmi was facilitated and awarded.

As a novelty, Rajalakshmi introduced a sequence in which a song is heard over the radio. It was a period when radio was not yet a familiar medium of entertainment.

Rajalakshmi employed stunt sequences to portray the kidnapping of the heroine by a hired gang for which she engaged well known stunt actors of the day – 'Battling' C. S. D. Singh and 'Stunt' Rajoo.

In addition of being a First Lady Director & producer of South Indian Cinemas, T.P. Rajalakshmi also holds a historic record of being the First Heroine of Tamil Films. Movie: Kalidas is the first Talkie film of South India & T.P. Rajalakshmi is the heroine of Kalidas movie. The movie reel of Kalidas was brought to the theatres as a procession by Tamil audiences in Chennai. All along the way, people lit Agarbathis and broke coconut, welcoming the Film Reel of the First Talkie movie starring their favourite Cinema Rani T.P. Rajalakshmi. Kalidas is a movie that showed the audience that 'MOVIES CAN SPEAK'. All the films that were released before Kalidas movie were Silent Movies. Also it is noted that before Rajalakshmi turned out to be a Heroine, male actors used to disguise as Women actors and act in movies for the heroine roles.

A staunch patriot, Rajalakshmi was associated with the Freedom Movement and the Indian National Congress. To express her devotion to the cause, she produced a film, India Thai. The British Indian censors objected to the title of the film, but TPR never minded the protest and she released the film daring in the name of the Indhiya Thaai. Heavily mauled by the censors, this film fared badly at the box office but she did not mind the loss for her, rather she felt it was her contribution to the Freedom Movement.

She later switched to matronly roles in movies such as Idhaya Geetham. Rajalakshmi became wealthy, owning sizeable properties in Kilpauk. In one of her movies, Nandakumar, T. P. Rajalakshmi objected to wearing a "katcham" (a bra-like costume). Noted star Durga Khote wore it for the Marathi version without a murmur of protest. However, Rajalakshmi threatened to walk out of the movie, and left with no option, a 1930s – Poona-fashion "jumper" blouse was used for the replacement of the katcham.

When T.P.R was staying at a hotel for her film shoot, Kumari Rukmini (Actress Lakshmi's mother) was staying on the next room where TPR stayed. Kumari Rukmini along with her parents met the star-Rajalakshmi & expressed Rukmini's interests & passion to act in movies. T.P.R recommended Rukmini for the film & Rukmini's film acting career thus begun. Similarly, when T.P.R visited Madurai for her film shoot, playback singer T.M. Soundarrajan visited T.P. Rajalakshmi as a courtesy call & asked for a singing chance.

T.P.R acted many films with V.A. Chellappa, T.R. Mahalingam, N.S. Krishnan, M.G. Chakrapani (brother of actor and former CM of Tamil Nadu- Dr. M.G.R). The combination of T.P.R & V.A. Chellappa was a super-hit expectation of the audiences and fans.

== Death ==
Rajalakshmi died on 20 August 1964 due to low blood pressure.

== Recognition and legacy ==
T.P. Rajalakshmi was awarded the Kalaimamani award in 1964. Dr.MGR sent his own car to Rajalakshmi's home & picked her up to felicitate her to the awarding venue.

T.P. Rajalakshmi's birth centenary was celebrated by the Government of Tamil Nadu. The Former Chief Minister of Tamil Nadu, J.Jayalalitha stated, "Tamil Nadu feels pride in gifting to the Indian Cinemas, the first female director, producer and heroine honored with the title – CINEMA RANI T. P. Rajalakshmi". Her birth centenary was celebrated recently as a Government Function to honor the pioneer.

The Nadigar Sangam of South India / South Indian Artistes Association led by Actor Nassar, Poochi Murugan, Vishal & Karthi Sivakumar honored TPR by constituting an award in her name (T .P .Rajalakshmi award) for the forthcoming generations in the 63rd Annual General Body Meet. Veteran Actress M. N. Rajam was the first recipient to receive the T. P. Rajalakshmi award.

Several other recognition were conducted by the Tamil Nadu Iyal Isai Naadagam Mandram, Ulagaayutha Tamil Talkies, Barathi Tamil Foundation. Smt. Kamala was honored in behalf of Cinema Rani TPR.

Actor Sivakumar during his speech at TPR's centenary celebration said- 'The magnitude of T.P. Rajalakshmi's achievement in becoming Southern Cinema's first woman Director-Producer is perhaps best demonstrated by the fact that Southern Cinema got its next Woman Film Director only after 17 years, when Bhanumathi directed Sandirani movie'

Sun TV honored Cinema Rani TPR on the occasion of the World women's day by organizing a show named Penmayai Potruvom.

Star Vijay TV honored Cinema Rani TPR in Neeya Naana show, hosted by Gopinath.

Podhigai TV conducted a special star cast interview of Cinema Rani T. P. R's daughter- Kamala along with veteran Cine Actor, Mohanraman in the show named Muthal Thiruppam.

T.P. Rajalakshmi was a social reformist who supported Dravidian movement and women empowerment. She conveyed good social messages and morals to people through her films & stage plays. She was a revolutionary film artist who fought for the freedom. She sung patriotic songs against British in her stage plays and was imprisoned by the British government several times for doing so, she conveyed social awareness messages through her films and stage plays against Sati, female infanticide & favouritism towards a particular caste or religion. She was a brave woman to make her mark in the Cine Industry. Her community deserted her for stepping into the Cinema Industry. Rajalakshmi was separated away by her community. However, that didn't stop Rajalakshmi to continue her contributions to the society and film industry.

== Filmography ==
Year	Film name	Director	Role	Notes
1929	Kovalan	Raghupathy S. Prakasa	Actor	
1930	Usha Sundari	P. K. Raja Sandow	Actor	
1930	Rajeshwari	P. K. Raja Sandow	Actor	
1931	Kalidas	H. M. Reddy	Vidhyadhari	
1932	Ramayanam		Sita	
1933	Savitri Satyavan		Actor	
1933	Valli Thirumanam	P. V. Rao	Actor	
1934	Draupadi Vastrapaharanam	R. Padmanaban	Draupadi	
1935	Harichandra	Prafula Ghosh	Actor	
1935	Lalithangi		Actor	
1935	Gul-e-bakavali	S. Soundararajan	Actor	
1936	Miss Kamala	T. P. Rajalakshmi	Miss Kamala	Directorial debut
1936	Bhama Parinayam	Y. V. Rao	Actor	
1936	Seemanthini	Ellis R. Duncan	Actor	
1936	Veera Abimanyu	Prafula Ghosh	Actor	
1938	Nandakumar	Keshav Rao Dhaibar	Yashoda	
1939	Madurai Veeran	T. P. Rajalakshmi	Actor & Director	
1939	Saguna Saraasa	Narayan Deware	Actor	
1939	Bhakta Kumaran	K. Ranga Rao	Actor	
1939	Tamil Thaai		Actor	
1943	Utthami	R. Prakash	Actor	
1945	Paranjoti	T. R. Raghunath	Actor	
1948	Jeevajothi	K. M. Multani	Actor	
1950	Ithaya Geetham	Joseph Thaliath Jr.	Actor	

== Family ==
Rajalakshmi had one biological daughter named Kamala Mony. T.P. Rajalakshmi inaugurated the birth year of her daughter- Kamala by naming the movie Miss Kamala Rajalakshmi also saved a child named Mallika from female infanticide, which was practiced in those days. Rajalakshmi adopted the girl.

T. Rajalakshmi's grandson is Mr.S.Raghavan and daughter-in-law is Vijayalakshmi Raghavan.

T.P.Rajalakshmi's great-grandsons & great daughter-in-law are Mrs. Suma Subramanian, Mr. Subramanian Raghavan and Dr. Harish Raghavan.
