= French kiss =

Form of kissing using tongue-to-tongue interaction

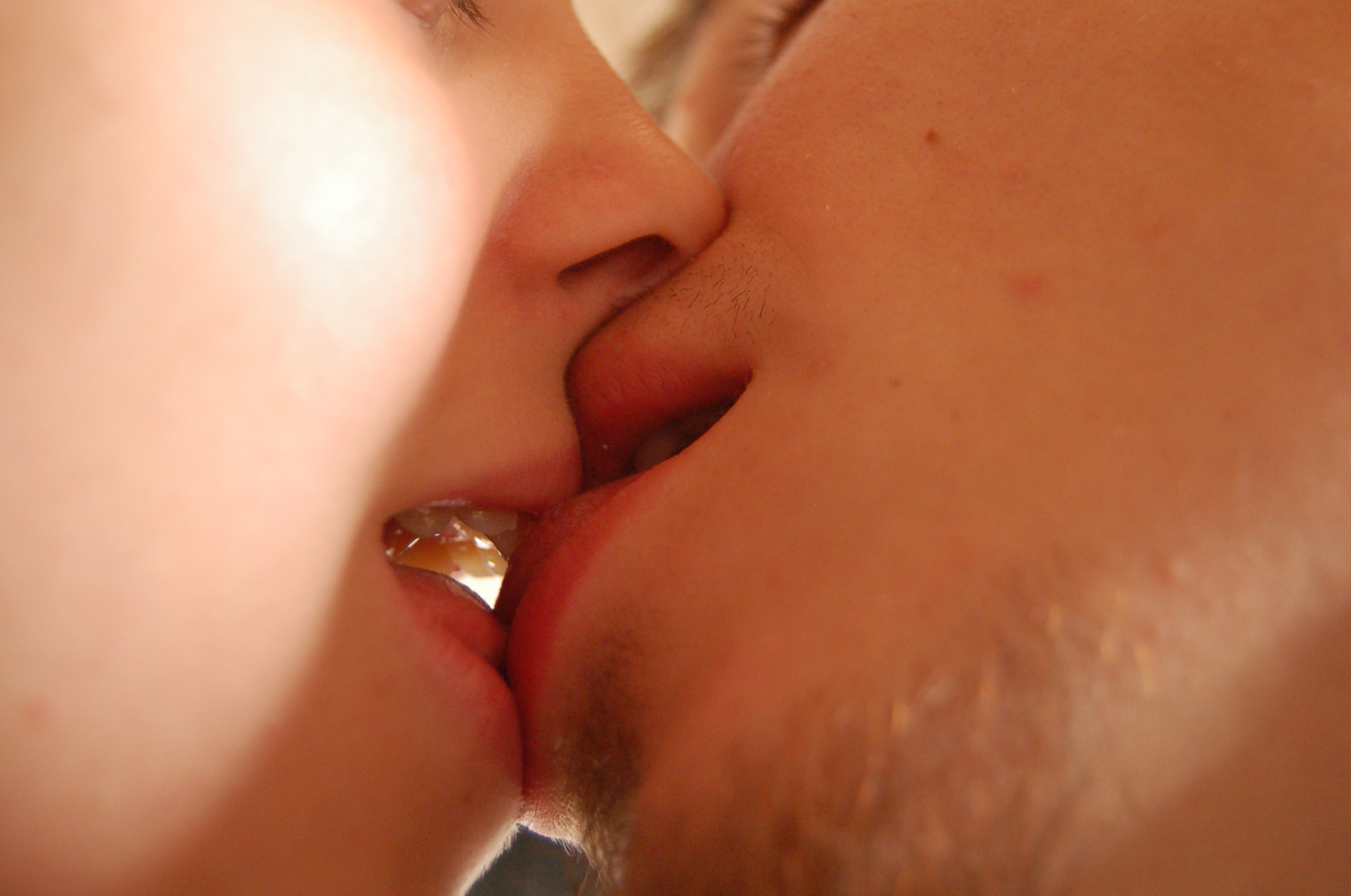
A heterosexual couple French kissing

A French kiss, also known as a tongue kiss, is an amorous kiss in which the participants' tongues extend to touch each other's lips or tongue. A kiss with the tongue stimulates the partner's lips, tongue and mouth, which are sensitive to the touch and induce sexual arousal. The sensation when two tongues touch—also known as tongue touching—has been proven to stimulate endorphin release and reduce acute stress levels.

Extended French kissing may be part of making out. The term originated at the beginning of the 20th century in the United States and Great Britain, as the French had acquired a reputation for more adventurous and passionate sex practices.

French kissing may be a mode for disease transmission, particularly if there are open wounds.

== Description ==
A French kiss is an amorous kiss in which the participants' tongues extend to touch each other's lips or tongue. A tongue kiss stimulates the partner's lips, tongue and mouth, which are sensitive to the touch and induce sexual arousal, as the oral zone is one of the principal erogenous zones of the body. The implication is of a slow, passionate kiss which is considered intimate, romantic, erotic or sexual. French kissing is often described as "first base", and is used by many as an indicator of what stage a relationship has reached. Extended French kissing may be part of making out.

== History ==
Open-mouth kissing is alluded to in Sanskrit texts from 1500 BCE, and the Kama Sutra from the 3rd century mentions kissing inside of mouths. The term cataglottism was described in 17th and 18th century English dictionaries to mean "the thrusting out the tongue in kissing."

== Etymology ==
A French kiss is so called because at the beginning of the 20th century, in the English-speaking world, the French had acquired a reputation for more adventurous and passionate sex practices. It originated in America and Great Britain. In France, it is referred to as un baiser amoureux ("a lover's kiss") or un baiser avec la langue ("a kiss with the tongue"), and was previously known as un baiser Florentin ("a Florentine kiss"). The 2014 edition of the Petit Robert French dictionary, released in 2013, added the French verb "se galocher", slang for kissing with tongues. The informal English term "frenching" also means French kissing, as does the Quebec French term "frencher".

== Disease risks ==
A study showed that French kissing can carry moderate risk of HPV. However, June Gupta, the associate director of medical standards at Planned Parenthood, has described kissing as a low-risk activity, stating that there is "almost no risk, or a very very low risk of getting STDs through these acts." The possibility of contracting HIV from French kissing is extremely low, as transmission would require open wounds. The Centers for Disease Control and Prevention considers transmission of Hepatitis B via French kissing to be an unlikely mode of infection. However, deep kissing that involves the exchange of large amounts of saliva might result in infection if there are cuts or abrasions in the mouth of the infected person, especially if they have a high viral load. Occasionally, syphilis can be passed through prolonged French kissing, but this usually requires contact with an active lesion. French kissing is an unlikely mode of transmission of infection by gonorrhea. It can also be a medium to spread meningitis.

== In other species ==
As of 2019, bonobos are the only species, other than humans, to have been observed engaging in tongue kissing.

== See also ==
- Lip kiss
- Socialist fraternal kiss
