= Marthanda Varma (disambiguation) =

Marthanda Varma was the king of Travancore, south India, from 1729 to 1758.

Marthanda Varma may also refer to:

- Marthandavarma (novel), an 1891 novel by C. V. Raman Pillai
  - Marthanda Varma (film), a 1933 film adaptation of the novel
- R. Marthanda Varma (died 2015), Indian neurosurgeon
- Marthanda Varma Sankaran Valiathan (born 1934), Indian cardiac surgeon
