= Vigathakumaran =

First Malayalam film

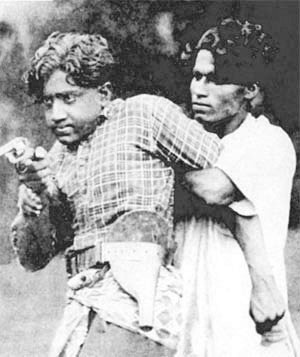
- A scene from the film
- Directed by: J. C. Daniel
- Written by: J. C. Daniel
- Produced by: J. C. Daniel; Janet Daniel
- Starring: J. C. Daniel; P. K. Rosy
- Edited by: J. C. Daniel Nadar
- Production company: Travancore National Pictures
- Release dates: 7 November 1928 (or); 23 October 1930; (Note: Many sources cite the release date as 23 October 1930, a topic explored at length in an article by journalist Adv Narayan published in 2012. His view is that Chelangatt Gopalakrishnan's "meticulous research", putting the date at 7 November 1928, was lost after various sources, after an unverified copy of a handbill about the film, which came to light during the 8th International Film Festival of Kerala in 2003, giving the date as 23 October 1930. This was widely reported in the media, and was repeated by journalist Kunnukuzhi Mani. R. Gopalakrishnan, author of Broken Dreams (2020) presents evidence in his book that the film was not released in 1928, saying in an interview "If the movie was released in 1928, why is there no news of it in any of the newspapers? Also, there is no proof that the Capitol Cinema Hall was burned down". Many other sources cite the 1928 release date. Kiran Ravindran, who made the documentary The Lost Child, asserts that Vigathakumaran was first released in 1928, not 1930.)
- Country: India
- Language: Malayalam (silent)

Vigathakumaran (English: The Lost Child) is a 1928 (or possibly 1930) Indian silent film written, produced and directed by J. C. Daniel, who also played the hero in the movie. The lead actress P. K. Rosy was a Dalit who played an upper-caste Nair woman, which caused an uproar at the film's premiere at the Capitol Theatre in Thiruvananthapuram. It was the first Malayalam feature film and is considered India's first social drama. Daniel is regarded as the father of the Malayalam cinema industry for this work. No copy of the film is known to have survived and Vigathakumaran is considered a lost film.

== Plot ==
Chandrakumar, son of a rich man in the Kingdom of Travancore, is kidnapped by the villain Bhoothanathan taken to British Ceylon. His parents' efforts to find him fail and Chandrakumar is brought up as a labourer on an estate. The estate owner, who is British, takes a liking to him and in time, Chandrakumar rises to the post of superintendent. At this time Jayachandran, a distant relative of Chandrakumar happens to come to Ceylon. Incidentally, he is robbed of all his belongings by Bhoothanathan. Stranded, he gets acquainted with Chandrakumar and they become close friends. They come to Travancore where Chandrakumar's sister falls in love with Jayachandran. Meanwhile, Bhoothanathan attempts to kidnap her and the duo's timely intervention saves her. A scar on the back reveals Chandrakumar's identity, which finally leads to the happy reunion of the family.

== Cast ==
- J. C. Daniel as Jayachandran
- P. K. Rosy as Sarojini
- Johnson as Bhoothanathan
- R. Sunder Raj as Chandrakumar (Note: Friend of Daniel, a film producer, known for the 1933 silent film Marthanda Varma. Also referred to as simply Sunder Raj, and sometimes Sundar Raj.)
- Sundaram Daniel (JC's son)
- Sulochana Daniel (JC's daughter)

== Production ==
J.C. Daniel developed a passion for cinema while completing his higher education in Travancore. He was interested in martial arts and was an expert in chelambatam, the traditional martial art of southern Travancore, and wished to popularise chelambatam by harnessing the popular influence of cinema. At that time the common people of Kerala were not even aware of cinema, so the idea was quite a challenge. He took the challenge and left for Madras (now Chennai) to learn techniques of film-making and to acquire necessary equipments. Madras was the budding centre of film production in South India and had the only permanent talkies cinema in South India, named Gaiety, established in 1912. However, he could not get what he wanted from Madras and was even denied permission to enter various studio premises there. He then travelled to Bombay (now Mumbai), the centre of Hindi cinema production. He asked the studio owners for entry, claiming to be a teacher from Kerala who wanted to teach his students about cinema, thus gaining entry to the studios there. He was able to gather enough knowledge and equipment for film production from Bombay, and came back to Kerala to fulfil his dream. The film was finally shot in his own studio, which he established in 1926, Travancore National Pictures. It was the first film studio in Kerala, and located in Pattom, Thiruvananthapuram. He made money for the purpose by selling a piece of land in his name for 400,000 British Indian Rupees, and started production of the film of his dreams. He wrote the script and titled it Vigathakumaran (English: The Lost Child). He directed and wielded the camera for the film, which was silent. He was also the protagonist in the film. He also did most of the post-production work, including editing. The theme of the film was of social significance and was the first in that genre. Most of the Indian cinemas at that time were based on stories from the puranas and cinemas with social themes were scarce. The film was shot using a Debrie camera. A British cinematographer called Ms Lala (or Miss Lana) is also reported as being involved in the production. The film was made in 1928.

The first Malayalam actress was a scheduled caste labourer named P K Rosy, from Thiruvananthapuram. She used to come with lunch to act in the movie and go to her other work in the evening. Daniel had earlier signed an actress from Bombay named Lana to act in the heroine role.

Another important role, the villain Bhoothanathan, was played by the actor Johnson, who is the father of actress B. S. Saroja. It was Johnson who suggested that the role of Sarojini could be played by Rosy.

Two of Daniel's children, his son Sundaram and daughter Sulochana, appeared in the film.

== Release ==
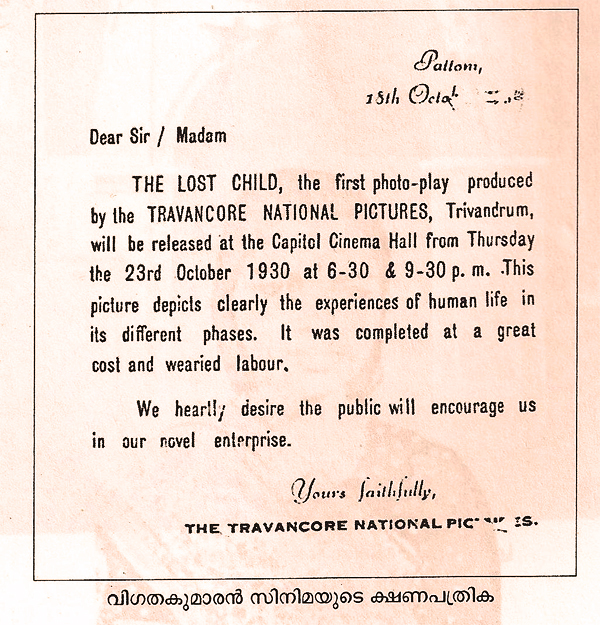
Pre-release advertisement

The release date of the film is debated, with two dates reported: 7 November 1928 and 23 October 1930. Most sources suggest the earlier date, as the later date is based on an unverified copy of a handbill (illustrated here) about the film that only came to light in 2003. However, among others, R. Gopalakrishnan, who made a documentary film about Daniel in 2006 and published the 2020 book Broken Dreams, about Daniel, his wife, producer R. Sunder Raj, his wife Devaki Bai, and Rama Reddy, who owned the Capitol Cinema, believes that the film was must have been released at the later date.

Vigathakumaran premiered in Thiruvananthapuram at the Capitol Theatre. The theatre was located opposite the present day AG's office near the present day State Legislature Building in the centre of Thiruvananthapuram city. The screening was inaugurated by Adv. Malloor Govinda Pillai. Since it was a silent movie, there was an announcer at the theatre who would explain the story and the situation. Despite being the first cinema made in Kerala and the social significance of the cinema, it faced the wrath of certain Hindu orthodox groups in Kerala, due to the presence of a woman in the film. At that time acting in films were considered as an act worse than prostitution. It was a period when female roles in even plays were played by males. Rosy was barred from the theatre as some upper-caste Hindus, outraged that a converted Dalit could play a Nair woman in the film, created a ruckus. During the screening, stones were thrown at the screen, damaging it.

It was later screened in Alappuzha, one of the most important port towns in Kerala during that time, at the Star Theatre. There the more liberal audience were more tolerant, receiving the film with praise. There was a minor glitch when the screen faded and the audience booed. The announcer explained that since this was the first Malayalam film, there would be some minor problems, and the audience received this statement with applause. It is said that J.C.Daniel himself came to Alleppey with the film box, since there was only one print. The film was also screened at Kollam, Thrissur, Thalassery, and Nagercoil. The film did only a moderate business at the box office and the receipts were way less than the expenditure. The screenings at Kollam and Thrissur led to riots, including trashing of equipment.

With the film not generating enough money at the box office, Daniel was heavily in debt, so he sold his equipment and closed down his studio. He left Thiruvananthapuram and spent the rest of his life as a dentist in Tamil Nadu.

== Aftermath and legacy ==
No copy of Vigathakumaran has survived. On the 90th anniversary of Malayalam cinema in Kozhikode in 2018, JC Daniel's youngest son, Harris (or Haris) Daniel, said that he had burnt the only print of the film as an act of revenge upon his elder brother, who featured in the movie. Harris was six years old in 1928, and he was being bullied by his brother.

The Government of Kerala initially refused to give Daniel a pension or award Daniel any honours because he was born and also later settled in Kanyakumari district, which later became a part of Tamil Nadu, in 1956. It said that if Daniel wanted any financial assistance, he had to apply for it from the Tamil Nadu Government. At the far end of his life, he had told R. Kumaraswamy, the editor of the film magazine Nana: "Malayalam cinema is a thriving industry now. But never have anyone bothered to recognise me as someone who made a film all by himself in those days. As for the new generation, they don't know me. But it is not their fault, I soothe myself." Long after Daniel's death in 1975, the Kerala Government instituted the J. C. Daniel Award in 1992, as a part of the Kerala State Film Awards, to honour lifetime achievements in Malayalam cinema.

Daniel is now known as "the father of Malayalam cinema". The failure of Vigathakumaran is attributed by some to it being a silent film, Devaki Bai, who acted in the 1933 film Marthanda Varma, suggested that it could have been because at the time, talkies in other languages were being screened and "a silent film wasn't much of a novelty".

== In popular culture ==
Nashtanayika is a 2008 novel by Vinu Abraham which details the life of P. K. Rosy, the heroine of Vigathakumaran. It was translated into English and published in 2020 as The Lost Heroine.

In 2013, Kamal wrote and directed a biopic about J.C. Daniel titled Celluloid. The film details the struggles of Daniel to produce and exhibit Vigathakumaran, while plunging into financial crisis. The film, based partially on Abraham's novel Nashta Naayika as well as the Life of J. C. Daniel, a biography by film historian and journalist Chelangatt Gopalakrishnan, also deals with the life of Rosy. Prithviraj plays the role of Daniel, while Mamta Mohandas plays his wife Janet, and newcomer Chandni plays Rosy. The film generated criticism over its subtle reference to an IAS Officer and the then Kerala Chief Minister, which purportedly points to the bureaucrat and writer Malayattoor Ramakrishna Iyer and K. Karunakaran, who allegedly worked together to deny J. C. Daniel credit for his contribution to Malayalam cinema since he was a Nadar (Christian). Author and civil servant N. S. Madhavan and D. Babu Paul, former Chief Secretary of Kerala, have pointed out factual inaccuracies in the film's depiction of Malayattoor and Karunakaran.

There are also several documentary films centred on the life and legacy of PK Rosy.
