= G. Bhargavan Pillai =

Indian writer on folklore (1933–2009)

Pillai during official days

G. Bhargavan Pillai (1933–2009), published under the name Ji Bhārggavanpiḷḷa, was an Indian writer on folklore in Kerala.

== Early life and education ==
G. Bhargavan Pillai was born in 1933 into a Mundakkal family from Kudassanadu, a small village in Alappey district (near Pandalam), Kerala.

He earned his degree from Pandalam NSS College in botany, and also earned a M.A. from University College of Kerala in Malayalam.

== Career ==
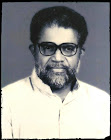
G. Bhargavan Pillai during retirement

Pillai worked as a producer for All India radio for over 30 years, retiring in 1991.

He was founding chair of Kerala Folklore Academy, located at Kannur, Kerala.

He published many books, sometimes recorded under the name Ji Bhārggavanpiḷḷa.

One of his most well-known works is Kakkarissinatakam (1976; Malayalam: Kākkariśśināṭakaṃ: gavēṣaṇagrandhaṃ), a book on Kakkarissi Natakam, a folk art of Kerala.

== Recognition and awards ==
- 1977: Senior fellowship from the Indian Government for his research works in traditional art forms of Kerala
- 1986: Scholarship from the Indira Gandhi Memorial Trust
- 1994: Kerala Sangeetha Nataka Akademi Award, category Keraleeya Kalakal
- 1996: Revathi Pattathanam Award

== Death ==
Pillai died on 17 April 2009 at the age of 75, in Trivandrum.

== Selected works ==
His major works include:

- Porottu Nadakaum Mattum
- Keralathile Paananmar Paadunnu
- Mathilerikanni Paniyalayil
- Radio Nadakam (study)
- Kakkarissinadakam (1976)
- "Aalayaal Thara Venam" (folk song)
- Nattarangu: Vikasaum Parinaamavum
- Ithihaasa Puthrikal
- Poomukham
- E.V. yude Jeevacharithram
- Pandalam K.P. - Kavyajeevitham
- Akashavaniyil Innale
- Naadodi Nadakangalude Pinnale
