= Miss Kamala =

1936 film by T. P. Rajalakshmi

- Poster
- Directed by: T. P. Rajalakshmi
- Screenplay by: T. P. Rajalakshmi
- Based on: Kamalavalli by T. P. Rajalakshmi
- Produced by: T. P. Rajalakshmi
- Starring: T. P. Rajalakshmi
- Edited by: T. P. Rajalakshmi
- Music by: T. P. Rajalakshmi
- Production company: Sri Rajam Talkies
- Release date: 1936
- Language: Tamil

Miss Kamala is a 1936 Indian Tamil language film written, directed and produced by as well as starring T. P. Rajalakshmi. The screenplay is based on her novel Kamalavalli. The film also stars T. V. Sundaram, C.M. Doraisami, "Battling" C. S. D. Singh, V. S. Mani, T. P. Rajagopal and "Stunt" Rajoo. Miss Kamala was the first Tamil feature film to be directed by a woman film director. The film made Rajalakshmi the first female director in South India and the second in India. In addition to producing and directing the film, she also wrote, edited and composed the music for the film. No print of the film is known to have survived, making it a lost film.

== Plot ==
Kamala and Kannappan are lovers. Kamala's parents do not approve of their relationship, and force Kamala to marry a doctor instead. On the wedding night, Kamala reveals her relationship with Kannappan to her husband and also tells him that she was coerced into marrying him. On hearing this, the polite doctor understands her feelings and promises that he will try to reunite her with Kannappan. However, the next day, the doctor suddenly leaves the home. Kamala's neighbours start to feel bad about her. Kamala then leaves the doctor's home and goes back to live with her parents, but they cruelly refuse to accommodate her.

A lonely Kamala starts looking to find employment to sustain herself, but she is unable to find any. She goes to meet Kannappan as a last resort, but he does not reciprocate her feelings and rejects her, citing that she is married to another man. Frustrated, Kamala attempts suicide but instead winds up in a car accident. She is rescued by a couple, who happen to be Kannappan's parents. They bring Kamala to their home and call for a doctor to treat her. The doctor happens to be her husband, who stands by his previous commitment to unite Kamala with her true love. Kannappan, however, becomes dejected after seeing Kamala in this condition at his home. After her recovery, Kamala disguises herself as a gypsy to earn money for her subsistence. In the process, she makes Kannappan fall in love with her. Kannappan then promises her that he will marry her in front of his parents. In the end, she reveals her identity and finally unites with Kannappan.

== Cast ==
- T. P. Rajalakshmi as Miss Kamala
- C.M. Doraisami
- "Battling" C. S. D. Singh
- V. S. Mani
- T. P. Rajagopal
- "Stunt" Rajoo

== Production ==
Rajalakshmi, a leading actress in Tamil cinema during the 1930s, produced and directed the film. The film was based on a novel titled Kamalavalli authored by Rajalakshmi herself; it was her first novel. It was also the first time where a Tamil film was made based on a social novel. Apart from scripting and directing, she also composed the music and edited the film. By directing the film, Rajalakshmi became South India's first woman director and the second in all of India, after Fatma Begum, who made Bulbul-e-Paristan in 1926.

Rajalakshmi played the titular role as Miss Kamala. Prominent actors like V. S. Mani and T. V. Sundaram made up the supporting cast. Rajalakshmi filmed a stunt sequence to depict a scene where the heroine is kidnapped by a group of hired goons. Two "well-known" stunt artists of the day, "Battling" C. S. D. Singh and "Stunt" Rajoo, were hired for this particular scene. At a time when radio was not yet a familiar mass medium, the film contained a scene where a song is heard over the radio.

The film had a "side reel" where in carnatic musician T. N. Rajarathinam Pillai performed a Nadaswaram recital. Film historian Randor Guy said that he did not accept any remuneration as a token of respect for Rajalakshmi. No print of the film is known to survive, making it a lost film.

== Bibliography ==
- Rajadhyaksha, Ashish; Willemen, Paul (1998) [1994]. Encyclopaedia of Indian Cinema (PDF). British Film Institute and Oxford University Press. ISBN 0-19-563579-5.
