= Nedungadappally =

- Village
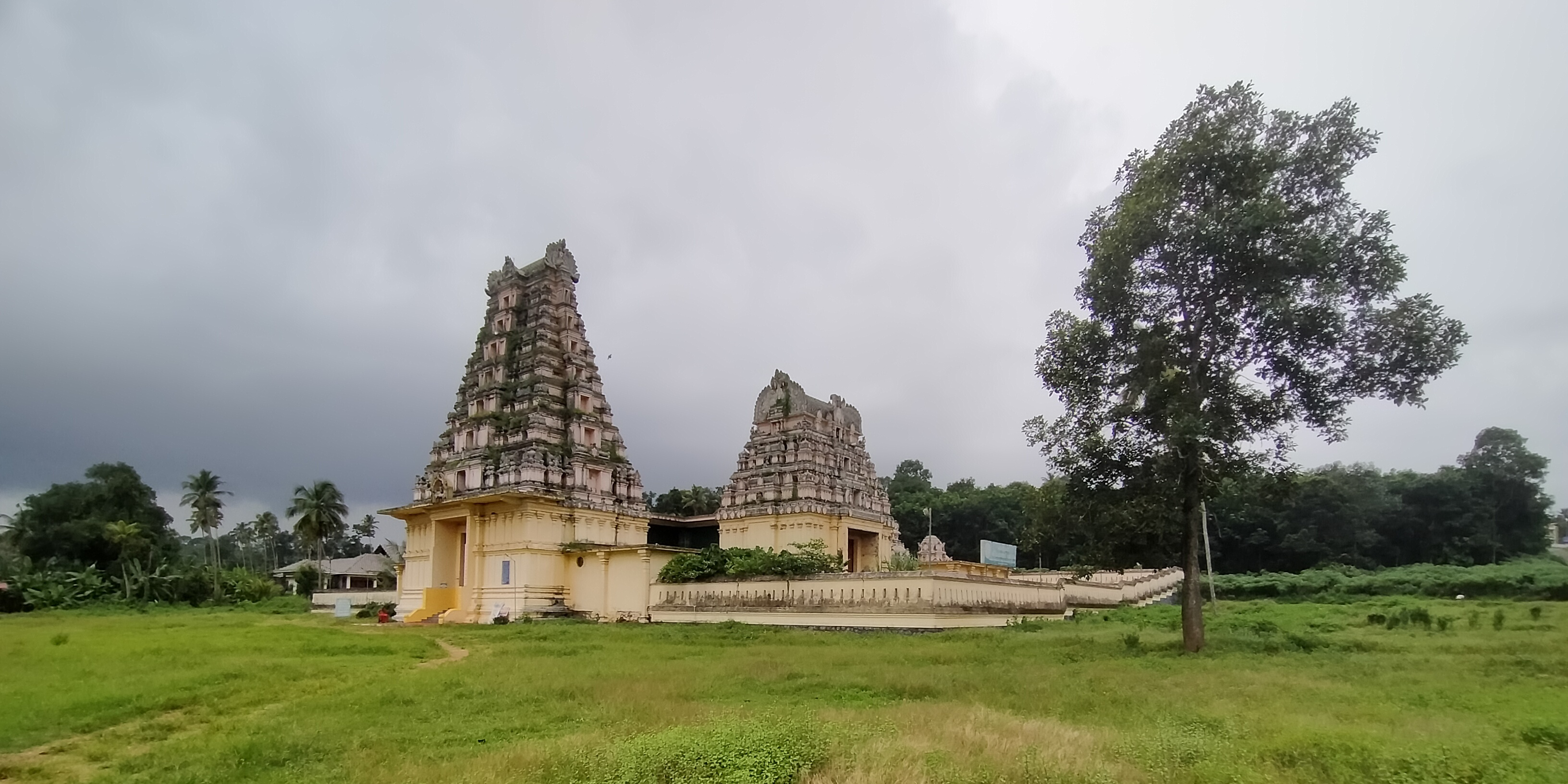
- Mahadevi Temple Santhipuram
- Nickname: N-block
- Location in Kerala, India Nedungadappally (India)
- Coordinates: 9°27′49″N 76°38′9″E
- Country: India
- State: Kerala
- District: Kottayam, Pathanamthitta
- Founder: Named after the Christian Nedungadapallil Family residing there.

Languages
  - Official: Malayalam, English
- Time zone: UTC+5:30 (IST)
- PIN: 686545
- Telephone code: 91 481, 91 469
- Vehicle registration: KL - 28 & KL- 33

Nedungadappally is a village in between Mallappally and Karukachal in Kerala, India. It is part of Thiruvalla Revenue Division, Thiruvalla constituency and Kanjirappally constituency. It comes under Mallappally Block and Vazhoor Block. It is near the boundary of Kottayam and Pathanamthitta districts. Nedungadappaly junction, which can be found at the heart of this village is home to banks, shops and clinics alike, where the famous Al-faham can be found.

== Schools ==
- CMS High school Nedungadappally
- St. Philomina's UP School
- CMS LP School Nedungadappally
- St. Thomas CSI English medium School

== See also ==
- Mankuzhipadi
- Mallapally
