= Making out =

American term for non-penetrative sex

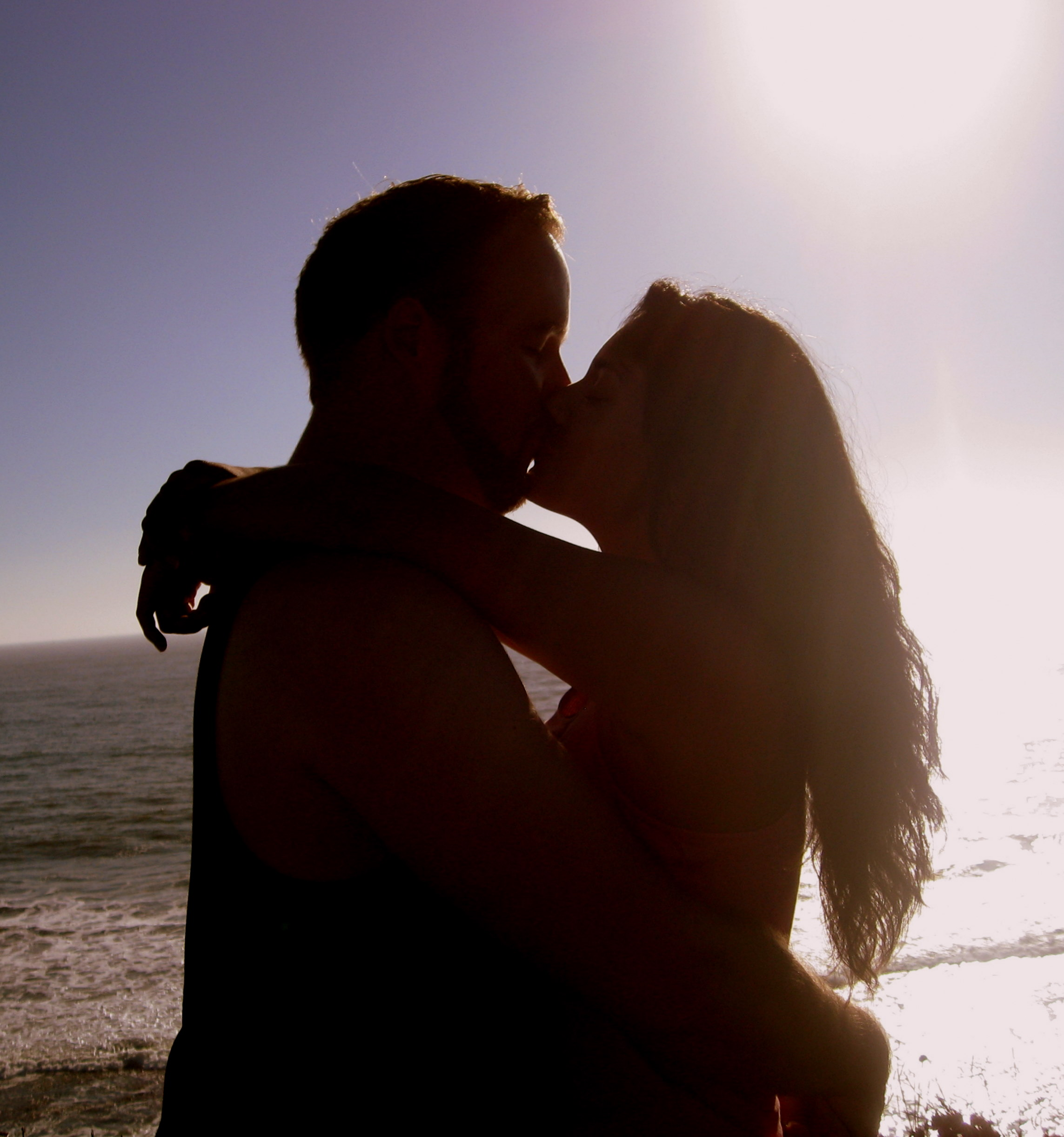
A couple making out

Making out is a term of American origin dating back to at least 1949, and is used to refer to kissing, including extended French kissing or necking (heavy kissing of the neck, and above), or to acts of non-penetrative sex such as heavy petting ("intimate contact, just short of sexual intercourse"). Equivalent terms in other dialects include the British English getting off and the Hiberno-English shifting. When performed in a stationary vehicle, it has been euphemistically referred to as parking, coinciding with American car culture.

== History ==
The sexual connotations of the phrase "make out" appear to have developed in the 1930s and 1940s from the phrase's other meaning: "to succeed". Originally, it meant "to seduce" or "to have sexual intercourse".

"Petting" ("making out" or foreplay) was popularized in the 1920s, as youth culture challenged earlier Victorian era strictures on sexuality with the rise in popularity of "petting parties". At these parties, promiscuity became more commonplace, breaking from the traditions of monogamy or courtship with their expectations of eventual marriage. This was typical on college campuses, where young people "spent a great deal of unsupervised time in mixed company", and theaters.

In the 1950s, Life magazine depicted petting parties as "that famed and shocking institution of the '20s", and commenting on the Kinsey Report, said that they have been "very much with us ever since". In the Kinsey Report of 1950, there was an indicated increase in premarital intercourse for the generation of the 1920s. Kinsey found that of women born before 1900, 14 percent acknowledged premarital sex before the age of 25, while those born after 1900 were two and a half times as likely (36 percent) to have premarital intercourse and experience an orgasm. The Continental zeitgeist is illustrated by a letter that Sigmund Freud wrote to Sándor Ferenczi in 1931, playfully admonishing him to stop kissing his patients; Freud warned him lest "a number of independent thinkers in matters of technique will say to themselves: Why stop at a kiss? Certainly one gets further when one adopts 'pawing' as well, which, after all, doesn't make a baby. And then bolder ones will come along who will go further, to peeping and showing – and soon we shall have accepted in the technique of analysis the whole repertoire of demi-viergerie and petting parties".

In the years following World War I, necking and petting became accepted behavior in mainstream American culture as long as the partners were dating. A 1956 study defined necking as "kissing and light caressing above the neck" and petting as "more intimate contact with the erogenous zones, short of sexual intercourse". Alfred Kinsey's definition of petting was "deliberately touching body parts above or below the waist", compared to necking, which only involved general body contact.

== Characteristics ==
Making out is usually considered an expression of romantic affection or sexual attraction. An episode of making out is frequently referred to as a "make-out session" or simply "making out". It covers a wide range of sexual behavior, and means different things to different age groups in different parts of the United States. It typically refers to kissing, including prolonged, passionate, open-mouth kissing (also known as French kissing), and intimate skin-to-skin contact. The term can also refer to other forms of foreplay such as heavy petting (sometimes simply called petting), which typically involves some genital stimulation, but usually not the direct act of penetrative sexual intercourse.

The perceived significance of making out may be affected by the age and relative sexual experience of the participants. Teenagers sometimes play party games in which making out is the main activity as an act of exploration. Games in this category include seven minutes in heaven and spin the bottle.

Teenagers may have had social gatherings in which making out was the predominant event. In the United States, these events were referred to as "make-out parties" and may have been confined to a specific area, called the "make-out room". These make-out parties were generally not regarded as sex parties, though heavy petting may have been involved, depending on the group.

== See also ==
- Sexual slang
- Baseball metaphors for sex
