= Chelangatt Gopalakrishnan =

Journalist

- Born: 5 June 1932; Cherthala, Alappuzha, Kerala
- Died: 4 June 2010 (aged 77)
- Occupation: Film Journalist
- Writing career
- Years active: 1950–2010

Chelangatt Gopalakrishnan (6 June 1932 – 4 June 2010) was an Indian journalist, known for his research and writings on Malayalam Cinema.

== Early life and education ==
Chelangatt Gopalakrishnan was born on 6 June 1932 in Alappuzha, Kerala to Sri Nediyedathu Kesava Pillai and Thrikkeparambil Ammukkutti Amma.

He graduated from the Government Arts College in 1951.

== Writing career ==
Gopalakrishnan started his career as a journalist in a regional newspaper, Malayali. Later, he worked for newspapers, including Mathrubhumi..

He rediscovered several forgotten personalities, including J.C. Daniel, the father of Malayalam Cinema.

He wrote more than 20 books about cinema, and also other books in various categories including children's literature.

J C Danielinte Jeevitha Katha (English: The Life Story of J C Daniel), a biography of Malayalam actor and director J. C. Daniel, was published in July 2011, a year after Gopalakrishnan's death.

== Other activities ==
Gopalakrishnan was a member of the jury for the Kerala State Film Awards for several years.

He ran a film studio named Ajanta Studio at Aluva. Many films, including Olavum Theeravum (1970), written by M. T. Vasudevan Nair, were produced at this studio.

== Death and legacy ==
Gopalakrishnan died on 4 June 2010.

In Kamal's 2013 biopic about J C Daniel, Celluloid, Gopalakrishnan is played by Sreenivasan.

== Selected works ==
- Loka Cinemayude Charithram (1989)
- Annathe Nayikamar
- Mukhaṃ nōkkāte (in Malayalam). Jaya Matha Books. 1967.
- Mukhathodu Mukham
- Chalachithra Abhinayam
- Vincent Muthal Vincent Vare
- Cinema Nirmmanam Keralathil
- Cinema Nirmmanam Pillerukaliyo
- Cinemayude Katha
- Vayalar (biography of Rama Varma Vayalar)
- Sangeetha Nataka Prasthanam Keralathil
- Malayala Nataka Charithram
- Aadyakala Malayala Cinema Naayikamaar
- Malayala Cinemayile Vaanavarum Veenavarum
- Malayala Cinema - Charithram Vichithram
- Indian Cinemayude Charithram
- Nataka Kala
- Charithrathilillatha Viplavakarikal
- Dakshinendiyayile Viplavakaarikal
- Marakkapppetta Viplavakaarikal
- Pathrapravarthanam Keralathil
- J C Danielinte Jeevitha Katha (2011)
