= J. C. Daniel Award =

Kerala's highest cinema award

- Awarded for: Lifetime achievement
- Location: Kerala
- Country: India
- Presented by: Kerala State Chalachitra Academy
- Reward: ₹500,000 (US$5,300)
- First award: 1992
- Final award: 2024
- Recent winner: Sarada

Highlights
- Total awarded: 31
- First winner: T. E. Vasudevan

The J. C. Daniel Award is the highest award in Malayalam cinema, established by the Government of Kerala, India. It is presented annually by the Kerala State Chalachitra Academy, a non-profit autonomous institution operating under the Department of Cultural Affairs, Kerala. Instituted in 1992, the award recognizes individuals for their "outstanding contributions to Malayalam cinema". Recipients are selected by a jury suggested by the Kerala State Chalachitra Academy and appointed by the Department of Cultural Affairs. As of 2021, the honourees receive a statuette, a citation, and a cash prize of ₹500,000 (US$5,300). They are honoured at the Kerala State Film Awards ceremony.

The Government of Kerala created the award to commemorate the contribution of Indian filmmaker J. C. Daniel, who is often regarded as the "father of Malayalam cinema". The J. C. Daniel Award was managed by the Department of Cultural Affairs until 1997. In 1998, the Government of Kerala constituted the Kerala State Chalachitra Academy, and since that year, the Academy has hosted the award. A cash prize of ₹50,000 (US$530) was granted with the award until 2002. In 2003, the prize money was doubled and, as part of a technical correction to update it; no award was presented that year. Actor Madhu was the first recipient of the award with the increased monetary prize of ₹100,000 (US$1,100) in 2004. Since 2016, the cash prize has been ₹500,000 (US$5,300).

Since its inception up to 2023, the J. C. Daniel Award has been bestowed on 31 individuals. The award was first presented to film distributor and producer T. E. Vasudevan in 1992. Actress Aranmula Ponnamma was the first woman to receive the honour, in 2005. The 2011 recipient, actor Jose Prakash, died before the award ceremony. His son accepted the award on his behalf. The most recent winner is actress Sarada in 2024.

== Recipients ==
List of award recipients
Year	Image	Recipient	Field of work	Ref.
1992	–	T. E. Vasudevan	Distributor, producer	
1993	–	Thikkurissy Sukumaran Nair	Actor, director, screenwriter, lyricist	
1994	–	P. Bhaskaran	Lyricist, director	
1995	–	Abhayadev	Lyricist	
1996	–	A. Vincent	Cinematographer, director	
1997		K. Raghavan	Composer	
1998		V. Dakshinamoorthy	Composer	
1999		G. Devarajan	Composer	
2000	–	M. Krishnan Nair	Director	
2001	–	P. N. Menon	Director, art director	
2002		K. J. Yesudas	Playback singer	
2003	No award			
2004		Madhu	Actor, director, producer	
2005	–	Aranmula Ponnamma	Actress	
2006	–	Mankada Ravi Varma	Cinematographer, director	
2007	–	P. Ramdas	Director	
2008		K. Ravindran Nair	Producer	
2009	–	K. S. Sethumadhavan	Director, screenwriter	
2010	–	Navodaya Appachan	Producer, director	
2011	–	Jose Prakash (Note: Jose Prakash died one day after the award announcement, hence he could not receive the honour. His son accepted the award on his behalf.)	Actor, singer	
2012	–	J. Sasikumar	Director	
2013		M. T. Vasudevan Nair	Screenwriter, director	
2014		I. V. Sasi	Director, screenwriter	
2015		K. G. George	Screenwriter, director	
2016		Adoor Gopalakrishnan	Director, screenwriter	
2017		Sreekumaran Thampi	Lyricist, director, screenwriter, producer	
2018		Sheela	Actress, director, screenwriter	
2019		Hariharan	Director	
2020		P. Jayachandran	Singer	
2021		K. P. Kumaran	Director	
2022		T. V. Chandran	Director	
2023		Shaji N. Karun	Cinematographer, director	
2024	–	Sarada	Actress	

== See also ==
- Dadasaheb Phalke Award
