= P. V. Rao (director) =

Indian film director

P.V. Rao, also known as V.V. Rao was an Indian film director and actor of the 1930s and 1940s. He directed the first movie which based on a historical literature written by C. V. Raman Pillai and the movie was Marthanda Varma. Marthanda Varma is also the second silent black and white movie in Malayalam and its script was also written by P.V. Rao.

Marthanda Varma Film

== Biography ==
Rao was born in Andhra Pradesh, but there is no more evidence about Rao's life. There is an argument about his initial, 'P.V' or 'V.V' but, according to publication dept. of Dehradun film city, he marked as P.V.

== Filmography ==
P. V. Rao acted in only one film. That film was Mangamma Sabatham in 1943 starring Vasundhara Devi and Ranjan in lead roles. In the film he plays a Minister.

- Mangamma Sabatham (1943)
