= J. C. Daniel =

Indian actor, director (1900–1975)

J.C. Daniel
- Born: Joseph Chellaiya Daniel; 26 February 1900; Neyyattinkara, Travancore (now Kerala)
- Died: 27 April 1975 (aged 74); Agasteeswaram, Kanyakumari District, Tamil Nadu, India
- Education: Maharaja's College, Trivandrum
- Occupations: Filmmaker, dentist
- Years active: 1926–
- Spouse: Janet Raechel
- Children: Sundaram Daniel, Gnana Sulochana, Subamathy Vijaya, Janet Lalitha, Harris Daniel
- Parent(s): Dr N.J.Daniel, Gnanammal

Joseph Chellaiya Daniel (26 February 1900 – 27 April 1975) was an Indian filmmaker, widely recognised as the "father of Malayalam cinema". He was the first filmmaker from Trivandrum Kerala. He produced, directed, wrote, photographed, edited and starred in Vigathakumaran (The Lost Child, 1928 or 1930), the first Malayalam feature film, made in Kerala. (Note: Many sources cite the release date as 23 October 1930, a topic explored at length in an article by journalist Adv Narayan published in 2012. His view is that Chelangatt Gopalakrishnan's "meticulous research", putting the date at 7 November 1928, was lost after various sources, after an unverified copy of a handbill about the film, which came to light during the 8th International Film Festival of Kerala in 2003, giving the date as 23 October 1930. This was widely reported in the media, and was repeated by journalist Kunnukuzhi Mani. Many sources cite the 1928 release date. Kiran Ravindran, who made the documentary The Lost Child, asserts that Vigathakumaran was first released in 1928, not 1930. R. Gopalakrishnan, author of Broken Dreams (2020) presents evidence in his book that the film was not released in 1928, saying in an interview "If the movie was released in 1928, why is there no news of it in any of the newspapers? Also, there is no proof that the Capitol Cinema Hall was burned down".) He also established the first film studio in Kerala, Travancore National Pictures. In 1992, the Government of Kerala instituted the J. C. Daniel Award, the highest honour in Malayalam cinema, as part of the Kerala State Film Awards, in recognition of his contributions to the industry.

== Early life and education ==
Joseph Chellaiya Daniel was born in Neyyattinkara, Travancore (now Kerala) on 26 February 1900, into a wealthy Tamil Christian Nadar family that owned substantial property. His father, N. Joseph Daniel (died 1915), was a doctor, who worked as chief medical officer at a government hospital. Daniel was the seventh of 11 children born to his mother Gnanammal Daniel, but two siblings died. Gnanammal was an only child and inherited a fortune from her parents. In 1905 the family moved to a little village called Puthuveedu. (Note: This source says he was born in Neyyattinkara, Kerala.)

Daniel attended Scott Christian School in Nagercoil from the age of 10. He finished his formal education from Maharaja's College in Trivandrum. He practised the Indian martial art Kalarippayattu as a child, continuing his training at college.

He published an English book titled Indian Art of Fencing and Sword Play in 1915, when he was 15 years old.

== Career ==
=== Learning filmmaking ===
Daniel was well aware of the scope of cinema as a public medium. He wished to popularise Kalarippayattu by harnessing the popular influence of cinema. At that time, ordinary people in Kerala were not even aware of the medium of cinema, so the idea was quite a challenge. He took up the challenge and left for Madras (now Chennai) to learn techniques of film-making and to acquire necessary equipment for the purpose. Madras was the budding centre of film production in South India and had the only permanent talkies cinema in South India, named Gaiety, established in 1917. However, he was unable to realise his plans in Madras and was even denied entry to various studios in the city. He then travelled to Bombay (now Mumbai), the centre of Hindi cinema production. He was able to obtain entry into film studios in the city, claiming that he was a teacher from Kerala and wanted to teach his students about cinema. He gathered enough knowledge and equipment for film production from Bombay before returning to Kerala.

=== Production of Vigathakumaran ===
In 1926, Daniel established the first film studio in Kerala, called Travancore National Pictures. It was near the present Public Service Commission office, Pattom, Trivandrum. He obtained funds for this purpose by selling a piece of land in his name for an amount of Rs.400,000. With everything set, Daniel finally started the production work of the film of his dreams. He wrote the script and titled it Vigathakumaran. The film did not have sound or dialogue. He directed and wielded the camera for the film and also played the role of the protagonist in the film. P. K. Rosie acted as the heroine. He also did most of the post-production work including editing. The theme of the film was of social significance and was one of the earliest films of the genre.

=== Post-release of Vigathakumaran ===
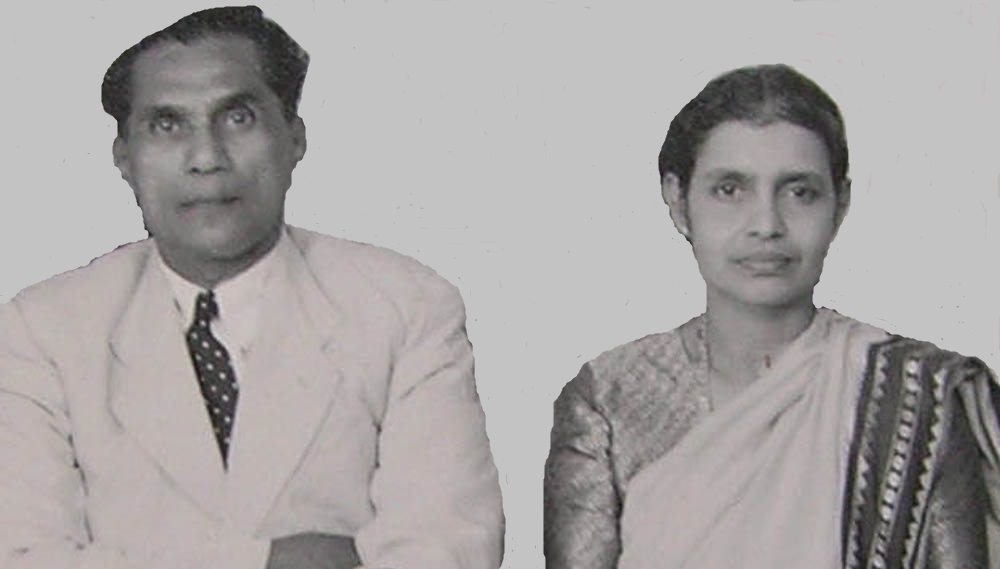
Daniel with his wife Janet

Vigathakumaran was exhibited in Trivandrum at the Capitol Theatre on 7 November 1928 or 23 October 1930. Despite being the very first film made in Kerala and having a socially-significant message, it faced the wrath of certain orthodox sections in the society due to the presence of a woman in the film. Rosie, who played the role of the female protagonist, was disbarred from entering the theatre, as upper-caste Hindus, outraged that a converted dalit played the role of a Nair woman in the film, created a ruckus. During the screening, stones were pelted on the screen, damaging it. The film did moderate business at the box office but the collections were way below the production cost.

The movie was also screened in Alleppey at the Star Theatre. Since it was a silent movie, there was an announcer at the theatre who would explain the story and the situation. Alleppey being one of the most important port towns in Kerala during that time, the audience were more liberal. They received the movie with excitement. There was a minor glitch once, when the screen faded and the audience booed. After the announcer explained that some minor problems might occur since this was the first Malayalam movie ever made and screened, the audience welcomed his statement with applause.

Vigathakumaran was also screened at Quilon, Trichur, Tellichery, and Nagercoil.

Daniel became indebted as the movie was not a commercial success. To pay his debtors, he had to sell his equipment and close down the studio.

== Personal life ==
At the age of 19 he met and fell in love with Janet Raechel, then aged just 13, and after waiting for five years and consent of the two families, they married in 1924 at the M. M. Church in Trivandrum.

They had several children, including a son, Sundaram, and daughter Sulochana, both of whom appeared in Vigathakumaran. A younger son, Harris, or Haris, burned the last print of the film when six years old, in an act of revenge against his older brother Sundaram, who he said had bullied him.

== Later life and death ==
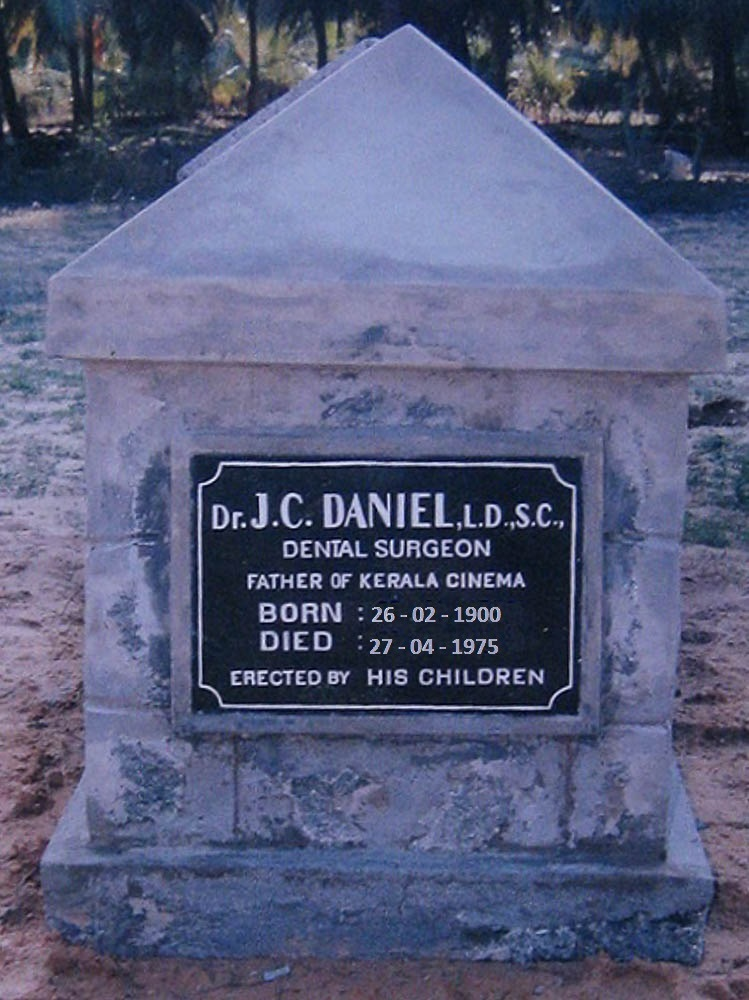
Daniel's tomb in Agasteeswaram, Kanyakumari

Daniel spent the rest of his life as a dentist at Palayamkottai, Tamil Nadu. He spent his last years in his ancestral home in Agastheeswaram. Although he applied for pension under the scheme for ailing artists, the Government of Kerala rejected it since he was from Tamil Nadu. In his books and articles, noted film journalist Chelangatt Gopalakrishnan established that Vigathakumaran was the first Malayalam film and that Daniel was its architect as director, producer, cinematographer and leading man. He described the story of Vigathakumaran in articles published since 1960, but Kerala Government initially rejected his crusade, saying that Daniel was not a Malayalee. The Government version was that if Daniel wanted a pension or financial assistance, he has to approach the Tamil Nadu Government. However, Gopalakrishnan's campaign was finally successful and Daniel obtained government recognition as a Keralite, being honoured as the "Father of Malayalam Cinema". He is widely known by this moniker.

Daniel died on 27 April 1975, and was survived by his wife, Janet. He is buried in a tomb erected by his children in Agasteeswaram.

== Recognition ==
=== J. C. Daniel Award ===
The Department of Cultural Affairs, Government of Kerala instituted the J. C. Daniel Award in honour of him in 1992. The award, a part of the Kerala State Film Awards is to honour lifetime achievements in outstanding contributions to Malayalam cinema. From 1998, the Kerala State Chalachitra Academy, an autonomous body under the Department of Cultural Affairs, Government of Kerala hosts the award.

=== J. C. Foundation Awards ===
The J. C. Foundation Awards are instituted by the J.C. Foundation, which was founded in memory of J.C. Daniel by his family and friends. The awards are given annually for achievements in Malayalam film-making and literature. There are a variety of categories for film, while the literature award is given for the best Malayalam novel.

== In popular culture ==
The Lost Life is a 21-minute documentary about Daniel's life made by R. Gopalakrishnan (aka Gopalakrishnan Raghavan Nair), released in 2006. Gopalakrishnan, a stills photographer for films, was as of 2013 the general secretary of the Film Photographers' Union of Film Employees Federation of Kerala (FEFKA). The Lost Life won a Special Mention in the Kerala State Film Awards in 2006.

In 2013, Kamal wrote and directed a biopic on Daniel titled Celluloid. The film details the struggles of Daniel to produce and exhibit Vigathakumaran, while plunging into financial crisis. The movie generated criticism over its subtle reference to an IAS Officer and the then Chief Minister, which purportedly points to the bureaucrat and writer Malayattoor Ramakrishnan and K. Karunakaran, who worked together to deny J. C. Daniel credit for his contribution to Malayalam cinema as he was a Christian, Author and civil servant N. S. Madhavan, as well as D. Babu Paul, former Chief Secretary of Kerala, have pointed out factual inaccuracies in the film's depiction of Malayattoor and Karunakaran. The film, based partially on the novel Nashta Naayika by Vinu Abraham and the Life of J. C. Daniel, a biography by film journalist Chelangatt Gopalakrishnan, also deals with the life of PK Rosy, the lead actress in Vigathakumaran. Prithviraj plays the role of Daniel, while Mamta Mohandas plays his wife Janet, and newcomer Chandni plays Rosie. The film won seven Kerala State Film Awards in different categories, including Best Film.

In October 2020 R. Gopalakrishnan published a book called Broken Dreams, which tells the story of Daniel, his wife Janet, producer R. Sunder Raj, his wife Devaki Bai, and Rama Reddy, who owned the Capitol Cinema Hall, where Vigathakumaran was filmed. Gopalakrishnan believes that the film was not released in 1928, but must have been released at the later date. Director Sreekumaran Thampi wrote the prologue for the book.
