= Anandavally =

Indian actress (1952–2019)

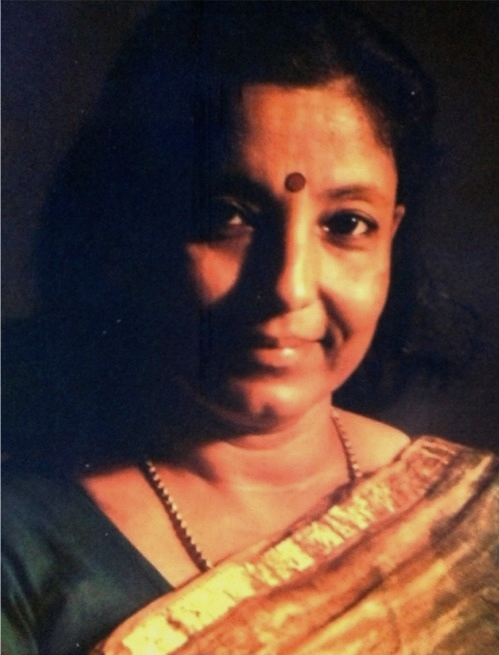
- Born: 14 January 1952
- Died: 5 April 2019 (aged 67); Thiruvananthapuram
- Occupations: Dubbing artist; actress; radio announcer
- Years active: 1969–2019
- Children: Diphan (son); A.Anulekshmy (daughter)

Anandavally C. R. (14 January 1952 – 5 April 2019) was an Indian actress and dubbing artist, who predominantly worked in the Malayalam film industry. She has lent voice to over 5,000 characters in over 2,000 Malayalam movies. Anandavally was the woman behind the voice and one of the senior most dubbing artists in Malayalam cinema. In 1993 alone, Ananadavally dubbed for at least 2000 films, lending her voice to lead female characters. This continues to remain among the unbreakable records in Malayalam industry. The dubbing artist had given voice to most of Geetha (actress) characters in almost all the 50 films she acted in Malayalam. In 1993, Anandavally dubbed for Vinaya Prasad as Sridevi in Manichitrathazhu, delivering the iconic dialogue "Entha Ammava." Anandavally was the voice of many strong women characters of the 1980s and '90s, including the much-loved character of Clara that Sumalatha played in Thoovanathumbikal.

== Personal life ==
Anandavally had two children: a son, Diphan, who was a noted Mollywood director, best known for directing the hit film Puthiya Mukham, and a daughter, Anulekshmy.

== Early life ==
Anandavally was born to Raman pillai and Chembakakutty Amma at Veliyam, Quilon. She did her schooling in "Kaiyela School" - Veliyam, where she began acting in school plays and later started Kadhaprasangam (story-telling performance) at the age of 13.

== Career ==
=== Drama artist ===
Anandavally used to sing for dramas even while a teenager. But unexpectedly, her acting skills were put to test in front of a large audience during the drama "Chithalu Kayariya Bhoomi" in 1969. Then she started performing in several dramas of KPAC, Kalidasa Kalakendram, Deshabhimani Theaters-Attingal, Kerala Theaters-Kottayam and Kayamkulam Peoples Theaters.

=== Radio ===
She also worked as an announcer in the All India Radio.

=== Film actress ===
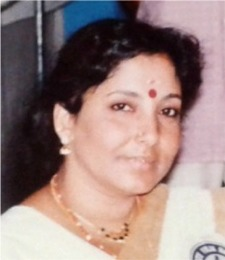
Anandavally

Her acting career began with Enippadikal (1971). She acted in nearly 50 films till Kaliveedu(1996). Anandavally entered the film industry through the film Kaadu (1973 Malayalam film) and went on to act in below given films. She became interested in pursuing a career in the entertainment industry following a minor role in various Malayalam films, where she remained a regular until she decided to pursue a dubbing artist career.

=== Dubbing artist ===
She concentrated more on dubbing. Anandavally was one of the busiest dubbing artists during the golden ‘80s of Malayalam cinema.

In 1973, she debuted as a dubbing artist and gave sound for actress Rajasree in the film Devi Kanyakumari. In Manjil Virinja Pookkal Malayalam film she dubbed for Poornima Jayaram which was the break through. Her dubbing for actress Swapna in movies like Thrishna (1981) and Ahimsa (1981 film), Madhavi (actress) for Novemberinte Nashtam (1982) and Menaka (actress) (for various films including Engane Nee Marakkum (1983), Ambika (actress) (for movies including Rajavinte Makan (1986) and for Geetha (actress) (for films including Panchagni (1986) helped her in securing a prominent place in dubbing.

In 1993, she dubbed for Vinaya Prasad in the movie Manichitrathazhu, directed by Fazil (director), for the character Sridevi. One of her most iconic dialogues from the film was "Entha Ammava", which became widely recognized.

Thereafter, Anandavally did not look back. She has dubbed for numerous Malayalam films. She gave her voice for several leading heroines, the list as Geetha, Sumalatha, Madhavi, Menaka, Ambika, Urvasi, Jayapradha, Karthika, Parvathy, Gautami, Suhasini, Sobhana, Sukanya, Saritha, Silksmitha, Suchitra, Sarada, Bharathi, Bhanupriya, Rekha, Revathi, Radha, Radhika, Renjini, Mohini, Nanditha Bose, Vinayaprasad, Kanaka, Khushbu, Unni Mary, Santhikrishna and so on. The Kerala State Film Awards for dubbing artist was instituted in 1991 and Anandavally won the award in 1992 for the Malayalam film Aadhaaram dubbing for the character Sethulakshmy portrayed by Geetha (actress). In 1993, she dubbed for both Geetha (actress) and Nanditha Bose in the movie Paithrukam.

In several interviews, Ananadavally had said dubbing for Madhavi's character Annie in the movie Akashadoothu was one of her personal favourites and also dubbing for Sumalatha in Thoovanathumbikal, character "Clara" was also one of her favourites.

Similarly, she was also experimental as she tried out her voice in different dialects including for Bengali actor Lebani Sarkar in the movie Ponthan Mada (1983). While dubbing for Usha Uthup in the movie Pothan Vava (2006) she altered her voice so that it sounded apt for the singer-actor.

== Filmography ==
=== Actress ===
Year	Acted Films	Role
1973	Eanippadikal	
1973	Kaadu	
1974	Kanyakumari	
1974	Yauvanam	Doctor
1974	Vandikkari	
1975	SwamiAyyappan	
1975	Bharya Illaatha Rathri	
1976	Swapnadanam	
1976	Hridayam Oru Kshethram	
1976	Chottanikkara Amma	
1976	Samasya	
1976	Udyanalakshmi	
1976	Amba Ambika Ambalika	Maid Lalitha
1976	Survey Kallu	
1977	Sree Murukan	Lakshmi
1977	Penn Puli	
1977	Muhurthanagal	
1977	Vidarunna Mottukal	Ammini
1977	Neethipeedam	
1978	Kaidappoo	
1978	Thanal	
1978	Rowdy Ramu	
1979	Maalika Paniyunnavar	
1979	Pancharathnam	
1979	Paapathinu Maranamilla	
1979	Koumara Praayam	
1979	Hridhayathinte Nirangal	
1979	Kayalum Karayum	Daisy
1980	Anthappuram	Bhaargavi
1981	Pinneyum Pookkunna Kaadu	
1981	Archana Teacher	
1981	Grihalakshmi	Sukumari
1982	Padayottam (70mm)	
1982	Aa Divasam	
1983	Guru Dakshina	
1984	Swarna Gopuram	Mercy's stepmother
1985	Parayanum Vayya Parayathirikkanum Vayya	
1985	Katha Ithuvare	
1986	Saayam Sandhya	
1986	Veendum	
1987	Vazhiyorakazhchakal	
1988	Abkari	
1988	Inquilabinte Puthri	Sumithra Menon
1991	Eagle	
1992	Priyapetta Kukku	
1996	Kaliveedu	
2018–2019	Neelakkuyil (TV series) (Asianet)	Muttashi; Replaced by Geetha Nair following her death

== Serials ==
- Velutha Katrina: Dubbed for actress Sheela (2006)

== Dubbing artist ==
List of Film Dubbed
Year	Title	Dubbed for
1974	Devi Kanyakumari	U.P.Gracy(Rajasree)
1977	Rowdy Rajamma	Jayaprabha
1978	Dweep	Jayabharathi
1978	Avalku Maranamilla	Seema
1979	Lisa	Student in college
1979	Anupallavai	Seema
1980	Chora Chuvanna Chora	Shobhana (old)
1980	Ithikkara Pakki	Jayabharathi
1980	Angadi	Ambika
1980	Saraswathi Yaamam	Shobhana
1980	Lorry	Nithya
1980	Chamaram	Zarina Wahab
1980	Pralayam	Kanakadurga
1980	Karimpana	Reena
1980	Manjil Virinja Pookkal	Poornima Jayaram
1981	Arayannam	Roopa
1981	Kathayariyathe	
1981	Kallan Pavithran	Beena, Etc.
1981	Thrishna	Swapna
1981	Oothi Kaachiya Ponnu	Poornima Jayaram
1981	Ahimsa	Swapna
1982	Naagamadathu Thampuraatti	
1982	Balloon	
1982	Ruby My Darling	Poornima Jayaram
1982	Ilakkangal	
1982	Dhrohi	
1982	Kelkkaatha Sabdham	Ambika
1982	Ee Nadu	Anjali Naidu
1982	Edavela	
1982	Chambal kadu	Swapna
1982	Oru Thira Pinneyum Thira	Swapna
1982	Novemberinte Nashtam	Madhavi
1982	Olangal	Poornima Jayaram
1982	Padayottam (70mm)	Lakshmi, Poornima Jayaram
1982	John Jaffer Janardhanan	Madhavi
1982	Amrutha Geetham	Sathyakala
1982	Mukhangal	
1982	Snehapoorvam Meera	Poornima Jayaram
1982	Thadaakam	Poornima Jayaram
1982	Sree Ayyappanum Vavarum	
1982	Marmaram	
1982	Ithiri NeArm Othiri Karyam	
1982	Aa Divasam	Satyakala
1982	Velicham Vitharunna Penkutty	Poornima Jayaram
1982	Innalenkil Nale	Unnimary
1983	Mazha Nilaavu	Poornima Jayaram
1983	Hello Madras Girl	Madhavi
1983	Veena Poovu	Uma
1983	Pallamkuzhi	
1983	Kuyiline Thedi	Rohini
1983	Rachana	
1983	Guru Dakshina	Sunantha
1983	Eettillum	Menaka
1983	Chakravalam Chuvannappol	Sumalatha
1983	Mansoru Maha Samudram	Seema
1983	Karyam Nissaram	Poornima Jayaram
1983	Aa Raathri	Poornima Jayaram
1983	Ente Katha	Reena
1983	Oru Mukham Pala Mukham	Seema
1983	Pin Nilavu	Poornima Jayaram
1983	Aaroodam	
1983	Kinnaram	Poornima Jayaram
1983	Mahabali	
1983	Iniyengilum	
1983	Oomakkuyil	Ambika
1983	Sandhya Mayangum Neram	Unnimary
1983	Yudham	Poornima Jayaram
1983	Sagara Sangamam	SP Shailaja, Manju Bargavi
1983	Kingini Kombu	
1983	Kaathirunna Divasam	
1983	Saagaram Santham	Shanthi Krishna
1983	Vaashi	
1983	Marakkillorikkalum	Poornima Jayaram
1983	Engane Nee Marakkum	Menaka
1983	Ashtapadi	Uma
1983	Naanayam	Poornima Jayaram
1983	Koodevide	
1983	Kaikeyi	
1983	Maniyara	Seema
1983	Lekhayude Maranam Oru Flashback	Subha
1983	Rugma	Menaka
1983	Prashnam Gurutharam	Poornima Jayaram
1983	Ponnethooval	Madhavi
1983	Theeram Thedunna Thira	Ambika
1984	Jeevitham	Swapna
1984	Onnanu Nammal	Poornima Jayaram
1984	Veruthe Oru Pinakkam	Poornima Jayaram
1984	Makale Mappu Tharu	Satyakala, Sadhana
1984	Veendum Chalikkunna Chakram	Menaka
1984	Manasse Ninakku Mangalam	Menaka
1984	Aashamsakalode	
1984	Swanthamevide Bandhamevide	Swapna
1984	Adaminte Vaariyellu	Suhasini (old), Surya
1984	Aksharangal	Suhasini
1984	Oru Kochu Swapnam	Unnimary
1984	Appunni	Menaka
1984	Theere Pratheekshikkathe	
1984	Nethavu	Ranipadmini
1984	Raajavembaala	
1984	Anthichuvappu	
1984	Swarna Gopuram	Sunantha
1984	Athiraathram	
1984	Chakkarayumma	Kajol Kiran
1984	Onnum Mindatha Bharya	Menaka
1984	Aarorumariyathe	Suhasini
1984	Kaliyil Alpam Karyam	Lissy
1984	Sandarbham	Saritha
1984	Poochakkoru Mookkuthi	Menaka
1984	Piriyilla Naam	Poornima Jayaram
1984	N.H. 47	Satyakala
1984	Lekshmana Rekha	
1984	Aattuvanchi Ulanjappol	
1984	Mynaakam	Menaka
1984	Aalkkoottathil Thaniye	Unnimary
1984	Oru Thettinte Katha	
1984	Unni Vanna Divasam	Suhasini
1984	Rakshassu	
1984	Ente Kalithozhan	Menaka
1984	Vetta	
1984	Attahaasam	Urvashi
1984	Kanamarayathu	Unnimary
1984	Manithali	Seema, Unnimary
1984	Idavelakku Sesham	Sumalatha
1984	Thirakkil Alppa Samayam	Menaka
1984	Kurishuyudham	Madhavi
1984	Ente Nandinikutty	Menaka
1984	Muthodumuthu	Menaka
1984	Sreekrishna Parunthu	Sathyachitra
1984	Odaruthammava Aalariyam	Menaka
1984	Karimbu	Menaka
1984	Panchavadi Palam	Subha
1984	Koottinilamkili	Menaka
1984	Thirakal	
1984	Thathamme Poocha Poocha	Suhasini
1984	Sandyakkenthinu Sindhooram	Seema
1984	Paavam Krooran	
1984	Ente Upasana	Suhasini
1984	Paavam Krooran	
1984	Aduthaduthu	Ahalya
1984	Swantham Sarika	
1984	Umaanilayam	Radha
1984	Uyarangalil	Kajol Kiran
1984	Enganeyundashaane	Menaka
1984	Oru Painkilikatha	Rohini, Manochitra
1984	Oru Kochukatha Aarum Parayatha Katha	Saritha
1984	Minimol Vathicanil	Saritha
1984	Adiyozhukkukal	Menaka
1985	Chillu Kottaram	
1985	Vellarikka Pattanam	
1985	Punnaram Cholli Cholli	Lissy
1985	Ee Thanalil Ithiri Nerum	Rohini
1985	Muhurtham Pathnonnu Muppathinu	Saritha
1985	Mutharamkunnu P.O.	Lissy
1985	Pacha Velicham	
1985	Ormikkaan Omanikkaan	
1985	Makan Ente Makan	Radhika
1985	Snehicha Kuttathinu	Seema
1985	Thinkalaazhcha Nalla Divasam	Unnimary
1985	Aram + Aram = Kinnaram	Pooja Saxena
1985	Oduvil Kittiya Vartha	
1985	Mukhyamanthri	
1985	Onnanam Kunnil Oradi Kunnil	Pooja Saxena
1985	Janakeeya Kodathi	
1985	Mulamoottil Adima	Surekha
1985	Katha Ithuvare	Suhasini
1985	Oru Kudakeezhil	Madhavi
1985	Akkacheyude Kunjuvava	Uma Bannerjee
1985	Vasantha Sena	Seema
1985	Revenge	Silk Smitha, Anuradha
1985	Guruji Oru Vakku	Manochitra
1985	Manya Mahajanangale	Chitra
1985	Onningu Vannengil	Lissy
1985	Oru Nokku Kanan	Ambika
1985	Ayanum	Shobana
1985	Parayanumvayya Parayathirikkanumvayya	Menaka
1985	Angadikkappurathu	Swapna
1985	Koodum Thedi	Radhika
1985	Jeevante Jeevan	Anuradha
1985	Orikkal Oridathu	
1985	Akkare Ninnoru Maran	Menaka
1985	Uyirthezhunnelppu	
1985	Boeing Boeing	Menaka, Lissy
1985	Archana Aaradhana	Ambika
1985	Aanakkorumma	Menaka
1985	Nirakkoottu	Sumalatha
1985	Nerariyum Nerathu	Unnimary
1985	Ee Lokam Evide Kure Manushyar	Kajol Kiran
1985	Adhyayam Onnu Muthal	Madhavi
1985	Kiraatham	Anuradha
1985	Onathumbikkoru Oonjaal	Shoma Anand
1985	Puli Varunne Puli	Unnimary
1985	Aa Neram Alppa Dooram	
1985	Uyarum Njan Nadake	Mucherla Aruna
1985	Scene No. 7	Mucherla Aruna
1985	Upaharam	Jalaja
1985	Vannu Kandu Keezhadakki	
1985	Ezhu Muthal Onpathu Vare	Anuradha
1985	Shatru	
1985	Gorilla	
1985	Gaayathridevi Ente Amma	
1985	Kandu Kandarinju	Menaka
1985	Nirakkoottu	Sumalatha
1985	Iniyum Kadha Thudarum	Jayaprada
1985	Choodatha Pookal	Zarina Wahab
1986	Atham Chithira Chothy	Nadia Moidu
1986	Ariyaatha Bandham	Amala
1986	Sree Narayanaguru	
1986	Pappan Priyappetta Pappan	Unnimary
1986	Akalangalil	Seema
1986	Oppam Oppathinoppam	
1986	Ayalvasi Oru Daridravasi	
1986	Oru Katha Oru Nunakkatha	Geetha
1986	Shyama	Sumalatha
1986	Mazha Peyyunnu Maddalam Kottunnu	Lissy, Priya
1986	Panchagni	Geetha
1986	Karinagam	
1986	Bharya Oru Manthri	Chitra
1986	Pidikittapulli	
1986	Ardha Raathri	
1986	Ninnistham Ennishtam	Priya
1986	Chekkeranoru Chilla	Ambika
1986	Aalorungi Arangorungi	
1986	Vaartha	Geetha, Nalini
1986	Nilaavinte Naattil	
1986	Ithramathram	
1986	Malarum Kiliyum	
1986	Kshamichu Ennoru Vakku	Geetha
1986	Nakhakshathangal	
1986	Neram Pularumbol	
1986	Poomukhappadiyil Ninneyum Kaathu	Sulakshana
1986	Iniyum Kurukshetrum	
1986	Aarundivide Chodikkan	
1986	Sakhavu	
1986	Adukkan Entheluppam	Karthika
1986	Snehamulla Simham	Menaka
1986	Dheem Tharikida Thom	Priya
1986	Katturumbinum Kathu Kuthu	
1986	Njan Kathorthirikkum	
1986	Ice Cream	
1986	Nandi Veendum Varika	Radha
1986	Aavanazhi	Geetha
1986	Sukhamo Devi	Geetha
1986	Sayam Sandhya	Geetha
1986	Ee Kaikalil	
1986	Veendum	Jayasree
1986	Geetham	Geetha
1986	Pakarathinu Pakaram	
1986	Ponnum Kudathinum Pottu	
1986	Ente Entethu Mathrem	
1986	Sanmanassullavarkku Samadhanam	Karthika
1986	Padayani	
1986	Railway Cross	
1986	Ilanjippookkal	Sandhya
1986	Adiverukal	Parvathi
1986	Meenamasathile Sooryan	
1986	T. P. Balagopalan M. A.	Shobana
1986	Rajavinte Makan	Ambika
1987	Irupatham Noottandu	Ambika
1987	Thoovanathumbikal	Sumalatha
1987	Thaniyavarthanam	Saritha
1987	Nadodikkattu	Shobana, Seema
1987	Manivathoorile Aayiram Sivarathrikal	Suhasini
1988	Dhinarathrangal	Sumalatha
1988	Pattanapravesham	Ambika
1988	Vaishali	Geetha
1988	Ponmuttayidunna Tharavu	Urvashi, Parvathi
1988	Vellanakalude Nadu	Shobana
1988	Kudumbapuranam	Ambika
1988	Abkari	Urvashi, Jalaja
1988	Aryan	Shobhana
1988	Oru CBI Diary Kurippu	Urvashi
1988	Innaleyude Baakki	Geetha
1989	Oru Vadakkan Veeragatha	Geetha
1989	Carnivel	Parvathy
1989	Chakkikotha Chankaran	Geetha
1989	Varavelpu	Revathi
1989	Season	Shari
1990	Varthamana Kalam	Urvashi
1990	Thazhvaram	Sumalatha
1990	Malootty	Urvashi
1990	His Highness Abdullah	Gautami
1990	Lal Salam	Geetha, Rekha
1990	Mukham	Ranjini
1991	Adayalam	Rekha
1991	Kakkathollayiram	Chitra
1991	Inspector Balram	Urvashi
1991	Ulladakkam	Shobana
1991	Kottayam Kunjachan	Ranjini, Usha
1991	Kizhakkunarum Pakshi	Rekha
1991	Bharatham	Lakshmi, Urvashi
1991	Vishnulokam	Shanthi Krishna
1991	Amaram	Chitra
1991	Njan Gandharvan	Sulakshana
1992	Kauravar	Anju
1992	Kamaladalam	Parvathi
1992	Aadhaaram	Geetha
1992	Snehasagaram	Urvashi
1992	Rajashilpi	Bhanupriya
1992	Naadody	Mohini, Chitra
1992	Maanyanmar	Ramya Krishnan
1993	Dhruvam	Gouthami
1993	Patheyam	Rajani
1993	Akashadoothu	Madhavi
1993	Sarovaram	Jayasudha
1993	Manichitrathazhu	Vinaya Prasad
1993	Devasuram	Bharathi, Chitra
1993	Golanthara Vartha	Shobhana
1993	Chamayam	Sithara
1993	Vatsalyam	Geetha
1993	Maya Mayooram	Shobhana, Shanthi Krishna
1993	Arthana	Radhika
1993	Ekalavyan	Geetha, Renuka
1993	Sthalathe Pradhana Payyans	Suchitra
1993	Paithrukam	Geetha, Nanditha Bose
1993	Sukrutham	Gouthami
1993	Chenkol	Shanthi Krishna
1994	Pavithram	Shobana, Renuka
1994	Gandharvam	Shanthi Krishna
1994	Chakoram	Shanthi Krishna
1994	Sagaram Sakshi	Sukanya
1994	Ponthan Mada	Labony Sarkar
1994	Dollar	Padmini
1994	Thenmavin Kombath	Sonia
1994	Pidakkozhi Koovunna Noottandu	Vinaya Prasad
1995	Oru Abhibhashakante Case Diary	Heera, Asha Sachdev
1995	Vrudhanmare Sookshikkuka	Khushbu
1995	Thacholi Varghese Chekavar	Nirosha
1995	Agnidevan	Rohini Hattangadi, Kavitha
1995	Spadikam	Silk Smitha
1996	Kaalapani	Tabu (Old age)
1997	Chandralekha	Sukanya
1997	Bhoopathi	Kanaka
1998	Kanmadam	Sarada (Grandmother)
1998	Kallu Kondoru Pennu	Vijayashanti
1998	Amma Ammaayiyamma	Sukanya
2001	Shantham	Seema Biswas
2001	Karumadikuttan	Bharathi
2002	Mazhathullikkilukkam	Sarada
2002	Kalyanaraman	Subbulakshmi, Kalaranjini
2003	Kilichundan Mampazham	Seema, Soundarya (Frenzy Part)
2005	Rajamanikyam	Chitra Shenoy
2006	Pothan Vava	Usha Uthup
2007	Big B	Nafisa Ali
2010	Alexander The Great	Sudha Chandran, Fathima Babu
2010	Thanthonni	Ambika
2011	Pranayam	Jayaprada
2011	Naayika	Sarada
2012	Asuravithu	Lena
2012	Spanish Masala	Vinaya Prasad
2015	Ivan Maryadaraman	Vadivukarasi
2019	Lucifer	Sreeya Ramesh

== Awards ==
Sl.No.	Awards	Details
1.	Enikku Maranamilla - 1978 (Kerala State Award For Drama)	
1.	Best Dubbing Artist - 1992	For Aadhaaram (1992), voice given for Geetha (actress)
2.	Chalachitra Prathibha - 1997	
3	Kalai Selvam - 1997 (Kerala Film Critics Awards)	South Indian Artist Association, Chennai.
4.	Best Narrator - 2007 (Kerala Film Critics Awards)	
5.	Guru Pooja Puraskaram - 2009	Kerala Sangeetha Nataka Akademi
6.	Kural Selvam - 2011	South Indian Cine Artists & Dubbing Union, Chennai.
7.	Award for contribution to Malayalam Film Industry - 2013	100 years of Indian Cinema Celebration - 2013 at Chennai.
8.	Best Dubbing Artist(s) - 2015 (Kerala State Television Awards)	
