= Tamil Nadu State Film Award for Best Villain =

Kollywood film acting award

The Tamil Nadu State Film Award for Best Villain is given by the state government as part of its annual Tamil Nadu State Film Awards for Tamil (Kollywood) films. The award was first presented in 1997, with Prakash Raj being the first recipient. He has won it a record five times.

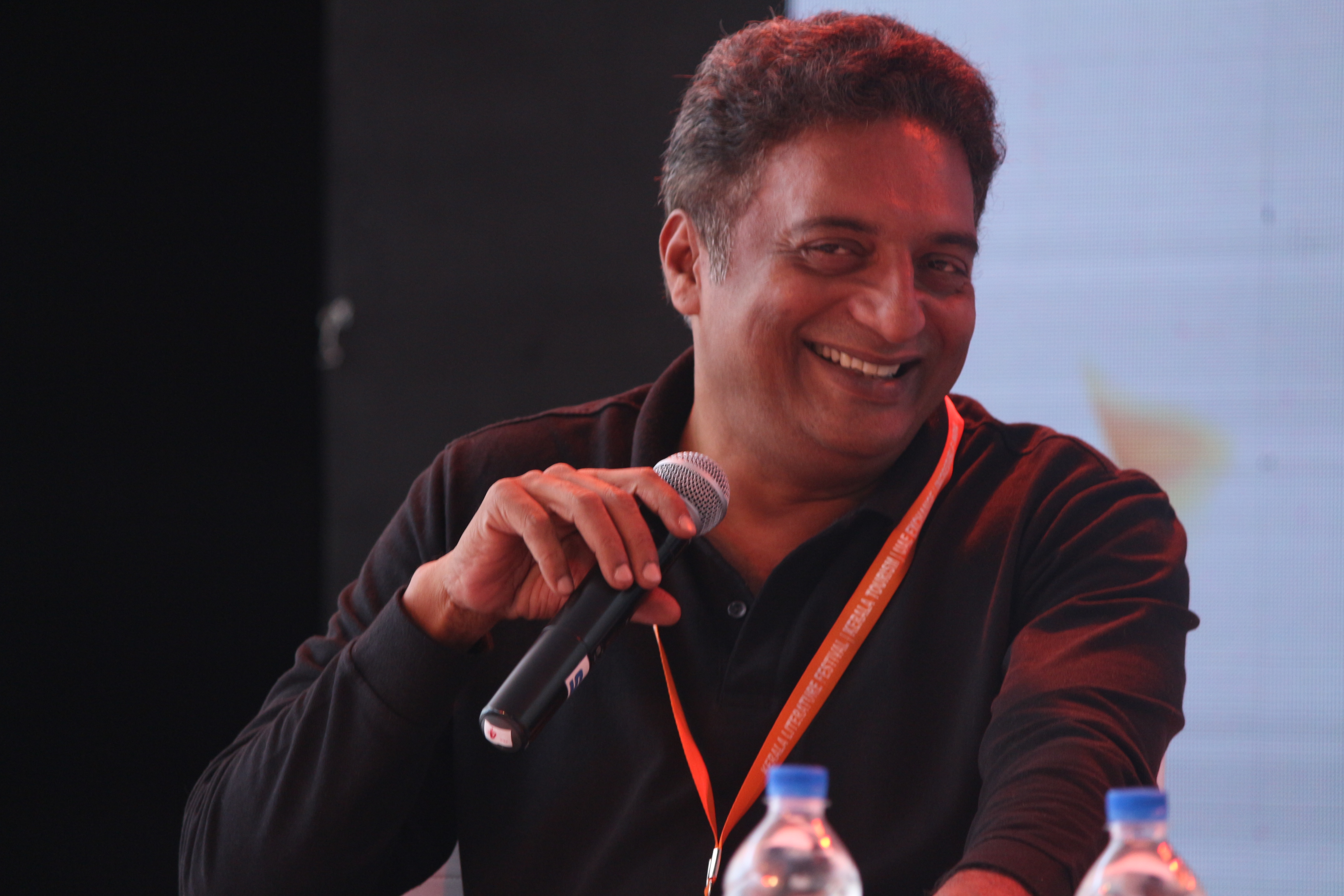
Prakash Raj Latest winner (Viruman)

== The list ==
Here is a list of the award winners and the films for which they won.

Year	Actor	Role	Film
2022	Prakash Raj	P. Muniyandi Thevar	Viruman
2021	Tamizh	Gurumoorthy	Jai Bhim
2020	Nandha	Bhaskaran & Natarayan	Vaanam Kottattum
2019	Arjun Das	Anbu Das	Kaithi
2018	Samuthirakani	Guna	Vada Chennai
2017	Prasanna	Balakrishnan (Balki)	Thiruttu Payale 2
2016	Rahman	Dr. Sathyamoorthy Rathnavel	Oru Mugathirai
2015	Arvind Swamy	Siddharth Abhimanyu	Thani Oruvan
2014	Prithviraj	Melachivilberi Gomathinayagam Pillai	Kaaviya Thalaivan
2013	Vidiyal Raj	Unknown	Aal
2012	Vijay Sethupathi	Jegan	Sundarapandian
2011	Ponvannan	JP	Vaagai Sooda Vaa
2010	Thirumurugan	Ilango	Kalavani
2009	Prakash Raj	J. D.	Villu
2008	Rajendran	Thandavan	Naan Kadavul
2007	Suman	Adiseshan	Sivaji: The Boss
2006	Pasupathy	Nellai Mani	E
2005	Prakash Raj	DCP Prabhakar	Anniyan
2004	Robert	Arun	Dancer
2003	Riyaz Khan	Shyam	Power of Women
2002	Nassar	Rathnam	Thamizh
2001	Alex	Masilamani	Mitta Miraasu
2000	Prakash Raj	Prakash Raj	Vaanavil
1999	Raghuvaran	• Aranganathar • Aande	• Mudhalvan • Iraniyan
1998	Ranjith	Manimaran	Marumalarchi
1997	Anandaraj	Dharmalingam Gounder	Suryavamsam
1996	Prakash Raj	Prakash	Kalki

== See also ==
- Tamil cinema
- Cinema of India
