= Akalathe Ambili =

1985 film

- Directed by: Jeassy
- Written by: S. N. Swamy
- Screenplay by: S. N. Swamy
- Produced by: Thomas Mathew
- Starring: Mammootty; Supriya Pathak; Maniyanpilla Raju
- Cinematography: Anandakkuttan
- Edited by: V. P. Krishnan
- Music by: Shyam
- Production company: Centore
- Distributed by: Centore
- Release date: 21 December 1985
- Country: India
- Language: Malayalam

Akalathe Ambili is a 1985 Indian Malayalam film, directed by Jeassy and produced by Thomas Mathew. The film stars Mammootty, Supriya Pathak, Rohini and Maniyanpilla Raju in the lead roles. The film has musical score by Shyam.

== Cast ==
- Mammootty as Ajayan
- Supriya Pathak as Ambili
- Rohini as Ashwathy
- Maniyanpilla Raju as Maniyan
- Santhosh as Edwin
- Jose Prakash as Kariyachan
- T. P. Madhavan as Menon
- Shivaji as Thomas Kariya
- Ajith Kollam as Aravind
- Rajan P. Dev
- N. F. Varghese as Police Officer
- Sankaradi as Ambili's father
- Mukesh as Ashokan
- Thilakan as Kichettan
- Rajasekharan as സി

== Trivia ==
Supriya Pathak done title role 'Ambili' in this movie.

== Soundtrack ==
The music was composed by Shyam and the lyrics were written by M. D. Rajendran.

No.	Song	Singers	Lyrics	Length (m:ss)
1	"Chanchalapaadam" (Kanavilo Ninavilo)	Vani Jairam, Unni Menon, Chorus	M. D. Rajendran	
2	"Etho Geetham"	K. J. Yesudas, Chorus	M. D. Rajendran	
3	"Nee Akale Nee Akale"	K. J. Yesudas	M. D. Rajendran	
