= Kaalal Pada =

1989 Malayalam movie

- Directed by: Viji Thampi
- Written by: Ranjith
- Produced by: Alex Kadavil; K. R. Harikumar; H. Vincent Kumar; Prabhakaran C.
- Starring: Jayaram; Suresh Gopi; Rahman; Ratheesh
- Cinematography: Santhosh Sivan
- Edited by: K. P. Hariharaputhran
- Music by: Jacob C. Alexander; Shyam (score)
- Distributed by: Seven Arts
- Release date: 1989
- Country: India
- Language: Malayalam

Kaalal Pada (transl. Infantry) is a 1989 Indian Malayalam-language action-thriller film directed by Viji Thampi and written by Ranjith. The film stars Jayaram, Suresh Gopi, Rahman and Ratheesh. The film has musical score by Jacob C. Alexander.

== Plot ==
Jaffer, a murder convict breaks out from jail with the help of his people outside. Outside they stumble into Sunny and Vichu accidentally before escaping the scene to avoid further issue, but not before they see Jaffer inside the van. Suspicious of Jaffer's identity, Sunny and Vichu approach their journalist friend Arun Menon. Arun approaches his now under suspension police friend Firoz who confirms their suspicions. Arun, Sunny, Vichu and Firoz belong to a close friend circle and Sunny is in a relationship with Arun's sister Maya with his approval. When jaffer is found dead at the beach, Arun begins to probe into the case and finds out that Jaffar was the henchman of Scaria Punnakkadan, elder son of the wealthy underworld businessman and Don Punnoose Punnakkadan. Punnoose and Scaria, together with his younger son Baby Punnakkadan run a shady underworld in the city and provide muscle to their acquaintances.

Since Jaffar was arrested for the murder of Income Tax officer Raveendranath, Arun visits his widow to press her into pursuing the case. He meets the late Raveendranath’ s uncle Govindan Nair who is downright hostile towards him. Arun who has an old score to settle with the Punnakkadan Family since they are the ones who usurped Arun's fathers’ wealth and made him a pauper, gets hold on Govindan with the help of their friend Sundaresan. Its then revealed that it was Scaria Punnakkadan who killed Raveendranath since he had raided the Punnakkadan Families offices and was going to act against them despite Punnoose requesting him not to do so. Arun publishes a report in his newspaper and gets Rabindranath's family to initiate a case against Scaria. The case gets rejected at court since Govindan changes his testimony and Scaria is acquitted. As retaliation, the Punnakkadans trap Maya in a prostitution case to humiliate Arun. Maya commits suicide out of the shame. Vichu is killed by Scaria and Baby when he goes to question them. Arun and Sunny break into Punnakkadans house on the night of Baby's Wedding and kills both Baby and Scaria. Sunny gets killed in the fight that ensues and Arun is arrested. He lets Punnoose to live grieving his 2 sons telling him that this is the punishment that he deserves.

== Cast ==
- Jayaram as Arun Menon
- Rahman as Sunny, Arun's Friend
- Suresh Gopi as Baby Punnakkadan
- Ratheesh as Scaria Punnakkadan, Baby's Brother
- Thilakan as Punnoose Punnakkadan, Baby and Scaria's Father
- Ranjini as Maya Menon, Arun's Sister
- Siddique as Vishwanath (Vichu), Arun and Sunny's Friend
- Sukumaran as Income Tax Officer Raveendranath
- Murali as Sub Inspector Chacko, Arun's Friend
- Vijayaraghavan as Jaffer
- Innocent as Govindan Nair, Raveendranath's Uncle
- Jagathy Sreekumar as Sundaresan Naicker
- Rajyalakshmi as Mercy Raveendranath
- Jagannatha Varma as Bhargavan Menon, Newspaper MD
- Sukumari as Arun's and Maya's Mother
- K. P. A. C. Azeez as Lawrence, Punnakkadan's Advocate
- Valsala Menon as Hostel Matron
- Ranjith as Violinist
- Ajith Kollam as Kareem
- Kollam Thulasi as SP Harishankar
- Ragini as Scaria Punnakkadan's Wife
