= Ente Kaanakkuyil =

- Poster designed by Gayathri Ashokan
- Directed by: J. Sasikumar
- Written by: S. L. Puram Sadanandan
- Produced by: Prem Prakash; N. J. Siriaca; Thomas Kora for Prekshaka
- Starring: Mammootty; Rahman; Revathy; Thilakan; Jose Prakash; Bahadoor; Sukumari; Meena; Prathapachandran
- Cinematography: Vipin Das
- Edited by: G. Venkittaraman
- Music by: A. J. Joseph; Johnson (BGM)
- Release date: 25 July 1985
- Country: India
- Language: Malayalam

Ente Kaanakkuyil is a 1985 Indian Malayalam-language film, directed by J. Sasikumar, starring Mammootty, Rahman and Revathi, and supported by Jose Prakash and Thilakan playing other important roles.

== Plot ==
Suresh and Anuradha are classmates. At first, they fight each other. Eventually, they fall for each other. But Anu's father Madhavan Thampi doesn't approve of their relation. He sets Anu's marriage with Mohan Kumar. Anu reveals about her love to Mohan. After being convinced by Mohan, Madhavan Thampi agrees for Suresh and Anu's marriage. Knowing about the marriage, Suresh goes joyfully, but gets into an accident and dies. Shattered, Anu lives a lonely life. Later it's discovered that she is pregnant with Suresh's child. After the delivery, Thampi gives the kid to his driver and tells Anu that the child was stillborn. Anu's life is shattered again. Eventually, Mohan finds out the truth and decides to find the child. He finds the child, Appukuttan lives with the driver Kumara Pilla, his wife and kids. Kumara Pilla loves Appukuttan as his son, but his wife hates the child. Mohan gains back Appukuttan and takes back to his mother. Meanwhile, Anu attempts suicide. At hospital, Mohan tells Appukuttan to call his mother back. He calls her and eventually Anu comes back to life.

== Cast ==
- Mammootty as Mohan Kumar
- Rahman as Suresh
- Revathy as Anuradha
- Thilakan as Kuttan Nair
- Jose Prakash as Madhavan Thampi
- Bahadoor as Sankara Pillai
- Sukumari as Subhadra Thankachi
- Master Vimal as Appukuttan
- Meena as Bharathi
- Prathapachandran as Kumara Pilla
- Prem Prakash as Driver

== Soundtrack ==
The film's soundtrack contains 2 songs, all composed by A. J. Joseph, with lyrics by K. Jayakumar.

#	Title	Singer(s)
1	"Malarithal"	K. J. Yesudas, K. S. Chitra
2	"Ore Swaram"	K. S. Chitra
