= Goal (2007 Malayalam film) =

- VCD cover
- Directed by: Kamal
- Screenplay by: Kalavoor Ravikumar
- Starring: Rejith Menon; Aksha Pardasany
- Cinematography: P. Sukumar
- Edited by: K. Rajagopal
- Music by: Vidyasagar
- Release date: 25 May 2007
- Country: India
- Language: Malayalam

Goal is a 2007 Indian Malayalam-language sports drama romance film directed by Kamal. The film stars Rejith Menon, Rahman and Mukesh. The film was a box office success. This film marks as Rejith's and Aksha's debut malayalam movie.

== Cast ==
- Rejith Menon as Sam Isaac
- Rahman as Vijay Das (Voice-over by Shobi Thilakan)
- Mukesh as Isaac, Sam's father
- Aksha Pardasany as Neethu
- Muktha George as Mariya Varghese
- Salim Kumar as Kuriakose
- Jagadeesh as Sreekumar
- Kunchan as Varghese
- Captain Raju as Principal Dr. Emmanuel George
- Shiva Raichandani as Rahul, Rohan's step brother
- Viplove Patel as Felix Joseph
- Mridula Warrier as School Student (Song Appearance)
- Job Kurian as School Student (Song Appearance)
- Niyas Backer as Selvan
- Ambika Mohan
- Jeny Susan Joseph as Vijay's wife
- Poornima Anand as Susan
- Bindu Murali as Mary
- Sangeeth
- Meena as Sam's mother (Photo Presence)
- Dolly Bindra as Mary Luca

== Soundtrack ==
Goal
- Album Cover for Goal

Soundtrack album by Vidyasagar
- Released: 10 May 2007
- Recorded: Varshaa Vallaki Studios
- Genre: Feature film soundtrack
- Language: Malayalam
- Label: Satyam Audios
- Producer: Vidyasagar

Vidyasagar chronology
Periyar (2007)	Goal (2007)	Rock 'N' Roll (2007)

The soundtracks for the film is composed by Vidyasagar while the lyrics are written by Gireesh Puthenchery and Vayalar Sarath Chandra Varma.

No.	Title	Artist(s)	Length
1.	"Dona Maradona"	George Peter
2.	"Oh Mariya"	Job Kurian, Sangeeth S, Ajay, Nitheesh and Mridula Warrier
3.	"Goal"	George Peter
4.	"Enthaaninnennodonnum"	Devanand, Swetha Mohan
5.	"Theme Music"	Instrumental
6.	"Manam Thelinja"	Vineeth Sreenivasan, Jyotsna Radhakrishnan

== Reception ==
A critic from Rediff.com wrote that "To sum up, Kamal's effort to score this Goal misses the post by a few yards".
