= Ivide Thudangunnu =

- Directed by: J. Sasikumar
- Written by: S. L. Puram Sadanandan
- Produced by: Mohan Sharma
- Starring: Mohanlal; Sukumari; Rahman; Rohini; Balan K. Nair
- Cinematography: Vipin Das
- Edited by: G. Venkittaraman
- Music by: Johnson
- Production company: Sathguna Combines
- Distributed by: Central Pictures
- Release date: 3 August 1984
- Country: India
- Language: Malayalam

Ivide Thudangunnu (transl. Begins here) is a 1984 Indian Malayalam-language crime thriller film directed by J. Sasikumar, written by S. L. Puram Sadanandan and produced by Mohan Sharma. It is a remake of the 1983 Kannada film Aasha, and stars Mohanlal, Sukumari, Rahman, Rohini, and Balan K. Nair. The film features music composed by Johnson. Ivide Thudangunnu was a major commercial success at the box office and a landmark film in Mohanlal's career.

== Plot ==
Krishnakumar is an orphan and a policeman who lives with his younger sister Sheela. Sheela falls in love with her classmate Babu and Krishnakumar accepts him as his brother in law. But tragedy strikes the couple on their honeymoon when Babu is beaten into a coma and Sheela raped and killed. The police arrest four middle-age friends who follow them. But Krishnakumar discovers that his sister's murderers are actually Babu's three classmates who are freed thanks to M. S. Menon, one of the killer's father. Krishnakumar seeks revenge.

== Cast ==
- Mohanlal as Sub-inspector Krishnakumar
- Rahman as Babu
- Rohini as Sheela, Krishnakumar's sister
- Rajyalakshmi as Indu
- Balan K. Nair as M. S. Menon
- Thikkurisi Sukumaran Nair as Adv. Balachandra Menon
- K. P. Ummer as Pappachan
- Meenakumari as Sarada
- Sankaradi as Kochannan
- Achankunju as Panikker
- Bahadoor as Kurup
- Maniyanpilla Raju as Peter
- Santhosh as Rajan, M. S. Menon's son
- C. I. Paul as Udumbu Narayanan, Smuggler
- Janardanan as S. P.
- Kuttyedathi Vilasini as Babu's mother
- Kaduvakulam Antony as Krishnankutty
- Kollam G. K. Pillai as P. C. Vasu Pilla

== Soundtrack ==
The music was composed by Johnson and the lyrics were written by Poovachal Khader.

Ivide Thudangunnu (Original Motion Picture Soundtrack)
| No. | Title | Singer(s) | Length |
|---|---|---|---|
| 1. | "Etho Swapnam Pole" | Vani Jairam, Mohan Sharma | 4:35 |
| 2. | "Nee Ente Jeevananomale" | P. Susheela, Mohan Sharma | 4:21 |
| 3. | "Thanaro Thanaaro" | Mohan Sharma | 3:51 |
| 4. | "Ennomal Sodharikku" | Mohan Sharma | 4:23 |

== Release ==
The film was a major commercial success of that year in Mollywood box office. Ivide Thudangunnu was a landmark film in Mohanlal's career.
