= Oru Mugathirai =

2017 Indian film by R. Senthil Nadan

- Theatrical release poster
- Directed by: R. Senthil Nadan
- Written by: R. Senthil Nadan
- Produced by: R. Selvam; L. D. Saravanan
- Starring: Rahman; Aditi Gururaj Acharya
- Cinematography: Sharavanapandian
- Edited by: S. P. Ahmed
- Music by: Premkumar Sivaperuman
- Production company: Shree Sai Vignesh Studios
- Release date: 17 March 2017
- Country: India
- Language: Tamil

Oru Mugathirai (transl. A mask) is a 2017 Indian Tamil-language psychological thriller film written and directed by R. Senthil Nadan. The film stars Rahman and Aditi Gururaj Acharya (in her debut and only film), while Suresh R and Shruthi Nandeesh play supporting roles. The film's score and soundtrack is composed by Prem Kumar. The film began production during July 2015 and was released on 17 March 2017. The film was dubbed and released in Telugu and Malayalam as Dr. Sathyamurthy and Mukhapadam (both in 2018). Rahman won the Tamil Nadu State Film Award for Best Villain.

Oru Mugathirai delves into the dark underbelly of online relationships and obsession, highlighting the dangers of anonymity on social media. The film's central narrative revolves around the twisted mind of a seemingly respectable psychiatrist and his escalating obsession with a young psychology student.

== Plot ==
The story begins with a fierce academic rivalry between two psychology students: Kanmani, a brilliant student from a modest background, and Shalini, a wealthy peer fueled by jealousy. Their constant friction leads the college correspondent to intervene, assigning them a joint task to mend their relationship: inviting the renowned psychiatrist Dr. Sathyamoorthy to conduct a campus orientation.

This assignment triggers a dark chain of events. Kanmani seeks advice from "Rohit," a Facebook friend she considers a confidant. Unbeknownst to her, "Rohit" is actually an alias for the much older Sathyamoorthy, who uses fake profiles to stalk and manipulate young women. When Sathyamoorthy arrives at the college, he uses his professional charm to "reconcile" Kanmani and Shalini. While appearing benevolent, his true motive is to isolate Kanmani and remove any distractions from his growing obsession with her.

Sathyamoorthy leads a double life: a respected professional by day and a digital predator by night. Under the guise of "Rohit," he promises Kanmani a future studying in the UK, eventually convincing her to ditch her family's arranged marriage plans and travel to Chennai. When the fictional "Rohit" fails to show up, Sathyamoorthy "coincidentally" appears to rescue her. He houses her in his mansion, maintaining a facade of paternal care while keeping her under constant electronic surveillance. The deception unravels at Sathyamoorthy’s hospital. When his assistant, Soori, accidentally crashes Sathyamoorthy’s iPad, Kanmani uses her technical skills to fix it. In the process, she discovers the "Rohit" chat logs. The horrifying realization hits her: her mentor, her protector, and her online lover are the same predatory man.

Parallel to Kanmani’s ordeal is the story of Arjun, a software professional spiraling into depression and drug addiction after being coldly dumped by his ambitious girlfriend, Maya. Seeking recovery, Arjun becomes a patient of Sathyamoorthy.

Now aware of the danger, Kanmani finds an unlikely ally in her former rival, Shalini. Together, they attempt to outmaneuver the psychiatrist. Kanmani uses Sathyamoorthy’s own tracking habits against him, leading him into a psychological trap where Shalini briefly poses as "Rohit" to sow doubt in his mind. However, Sathyamoorthy quickly sees through the ruse, and his obsession turns murderous. Realizing she needs more help, Kanmani approaches Arjun. She provides undeniable proof of Sathyamoorthy’s malpractice and manipulation. Recognizing that his doctor is a predator exploiting his fragile mental state, a transformed Arjun joins Kanmani to take him down.

The tension reaches a breaking point at Shalini’s guest house. Sathyamoorthy, now desperate to eliminate the evidence of his crimes, launches a direct attack. A brutal struggle ensues on the balcony of the fifth floor. As Kanmani is shoved over the edge, Arjun manages to catch her, holding her suspended in mid-air. In a frantic attempt to either drag Kanmani down or save himself, Sathyamoorthy loses his footing and plunges from the building. Sathyamoorthy survives the fall but suffers a traumatic brain injury resulting in permanent, total amnesia. He is left a blank slate, stripped of his manipulative intellect and his identity.

Years later, the narrative achieves a sense of profound poetic justice. Kanmani has fulfilled her dreams, becoming a world-renowned psychiatrist practicing in the UK. The film’s final irony is revealed when it is shown that Sathyamoorthy is now a permanent resident in a psychiatric facility—and Kanmani is the lead doctor overseeing his care. The victim has become the healer, while the predator has become a helpless patient, unknowingly dependent on the woman he once tried to destroy.

== Cast ==
- Rahman as Dr. Sathyamoorthy Rathnavel, masquerading as "Rohit"
- Aditi Gururaj Acharya as Kanmani (voice over by Deepa Venkat)
- Suresh R as Arjun
- Shruthi Nandeesh as Shalini, Kanmani's friend
- Devika Madhavan as Maya, Arjun's ex-lover
- Delhi Ganesh as Suresh's father
- Meera Krishnan as Suresh's mother
- Jeeva Ravi as Kanmani's father
- Rekha Suresh as Kanmani's mother
- Swaminathan as Nathan, the neighbor of Sathyamoorthy
- Chaams as Arjun's friend
- Pandu as the HOD of the psychology department
- Thadi Balaji as Soori, Sathyamoorthy's assistant
- Sai Prashanth as Kishore
- Suhasini as Vinodhini, Nathan's wife

== Production ==
=== Pre-production ===
The film began production in July 2015 and marked the return of director R. Senthil Nadan, who had previously made the horror film Sivi (2007). Senthilnadan had launched the film titled FB with tagline Statushae Podu Chat Pannu, but later changed the title to Oru Mugathirai.

=== Casting ===
Described as a psychological thriller based on Facebook, Rahman was signed to portray the lead role of a psychiatrist, while newcomer Model Aditi Gururaj Acharya (who already signed in a Kannada film but later she opted out) was cast as the female lead (victim) in the film and also marks her film debut. Aditi had initially refused the film, though Senthil Nadan managed to convince her to agree terms after six months. This was the only film of her entire career before switching her to Full-time Modelling.

=== Filming ===
The film was shot in 42 days in and around Goa, Puducherry and Ooty, with music composed by Prem Kumar, an associate of A. R. Rahman, while Saravanapandian, handled the camera work. Senthil Nadan worked on the project simultaneously alongside his commitments for a horror film titled Raja Magal.

=== Promotions ===
The success of Dhuruvangal Pathinaaru (2016) starring Rahman prompted producers of his delayed ventures to publicise and release their films to make most of the actor's renaissance at the box office. Subsequently, after the release of Pagadi Aattam in February 2017, Oru Mugathirai was prepared for a March 2017 release. Furthermore, the success of Dhuruvangal Pathinaaru's Telugu version, D16, meant that distributor D. Venkatesh also purchased Telugu dubbing rights for the film in March 2017. Similar to his lack of promotional activity for Pagadi Aattam, Rahman opted not to promote the film. For the film's release in Malaysia, it was agreed that profits from the film would go towards financing Tamil schools in the country.

== Soundtrack ==
Oru Mugathirai

Soundtrack album by Premkumar Sivaperuman
- Released: 19 August 2016
- Recorded: 2016
- Language: Tamil
- Label: Times Music India
- Producer: Premkumar Sivaperuman

The film's music was composed by Premkumar Sivaperuman, while the audio rights of the film was acquired by Times Music India. The album released on 19 August 2016 and featured five songs.

Track list
No.	Title	Singer(s)	Length
1.	"Maya Maya Netruen"	Ranjith	3:35
2.	"Un Oru Vizhi"	Aalap Raju	4:01
3.	"Jeans Potta Genius"	Sowmya Mahadevan	2:41
4.	"Naan Enbadhu"	Al Ruffian	3:44
5.	"Naan Enbadhu"	Kharesma Ravichandran	3:44

== Release ==
The film opened on 17 March 2017 to negative reviews, with the critic from The Times of India giving the film a negative review and stating "the theatrical nature of the performances, and the clumsy filmmaking drains the tension from the scenes". The critic further added "you can only sympathise with Rahman, whose career seemed to have taken an upturn with Dhuruvangal Pathinaaru (2016). For now, that film's success has resulted in two of his sub-standard previous outings (Oru Mugathirai and Pagadi Aattam) getting a release and taking things back to square one".
