= Kalki (1996 film) =

1996 film by K. Balachander

- Poster
- Directed by: K. Balachander
- Written by: K. Balachander
- Produced by: Rajam Balachander; Pushpa Kandaswamy
- Starring: Shruti; Prakash Raj; Geetha; Rahman; Renuka; Fathima Babu
- Cinematography: R. Raghunatha Reddy
- Edited by: Suresh Urs
- Music by: Deva
- Production company: Kavithalayaa Productions
- Release date: 10 November 1996
- Running time: 161 minutes
- Country: India
- Language: Tamil

Kalki is a 1996 Indian Tamil-language drama film written and directed by K. Balachander, starring Shruti, Rahman, Prakash Raj, Geetha, Renuka, Suvaluxmi and Fathima Babu. The film was released on 10 November 1996, and was dubbed into Telugu with the same name. For her performance, Shruti won the Filmfare Award for Best Actress – Tamil and the Tamil Nadu State Film Award for Best Actress, while Prakash Raj won the Tamil Nadu State Film Award for Best Villain.

== Plot ==
Chellammaa, a singer, is wedded to a chauvinistic, sadistic industrialist Prakash. She is unable to beget a child and hence is the target of hurting words from Prakash and his mother. When he prohibits her from singing, it is the last straw for her, and they divorce. Prakash marries Karpagam, a doormat wife, while Chellammaa stays single, with a cook named Kokila around to help her. Kalki works in an ad agency and is relentlessly pursued by coworker and model Paranjothi. She not only rejects him but also debunks love and sentiments. Chellammaa becomes friends with Kalki after a few encounters, and Kalki moves in as a paying guest. However, she strikes up a friendship with Prakash, and as the result of an affair with him, she ends up bearing his child. Kalki makes him understand what he was doing to his wife by treating him like the way he treats his wife. During the time of delivery, Karpagam, with her lawyer, threatens Prakash that she is going to divorce him. However, upon realising his mistakes, he apologizes to Karpagam and asks her for a second chance. She agrees with a condition not to hurt Kalki's child and also to live with Kalki. Prakash agrees to both the conditions. When they meet Kalki and inform this, Kalki says that she does not want to live with them as well as she is not ready to give the child to them. Before delivery, she meets Chellamma and informs that she did live with Prakash to teach him a lesson and had a child just for Chellamma and leaves the child with Chellamma after delivery. After that, the society is not ready to accept her, so she goes to Paranjothi, who is waiting for her and confesses her love for him.

== Cast ==
- Shruti as Kalki
- Rahman as Paranjothi
- Prakash Raj as Prakash
- Geetha as Chellamma
- Renuka as Karpagam
- Fathima Babu as Kokila
- M. N. Rajam as Ramamani, Prakash's mother
- Kathadi Ramamurthy
- Priyadharshini as Kalki's friend
- Thalaivasal Vijay
- Vasuki
- Mohan Raman as Shankaran
- Baby Anu
- K. S. Ravikumar as a lawyer (special appearance)
- K. Balachander as a film producer (special appearance)
- Suvaluxmi as an actress (special appearance)

== Soundtrack ==
The music was composed by Deva and lyrics were written by Ilandevan, making his debut. The song "Poove Ne Aadava" is partly based on "Against Doctor's Orders" by Kenny G.

| Song | Singers | Length |
|---|---|---|
| "Bhoomi Onnu" | Suresh Peters, Febi Mani | 05:15 |
| "Ezhuthugiren Oru Kaditham" | K. S. Chithra, Anuradha Sriram | 06:14 |
| "Lifekku 4 Eluthu" | Mano, Swarnalatha | 04:07 |
| "Poove Ne Aadava" | Sujatha | 05:05 |
| "Porul Thedum Bhoomiyil" (Lady) | Sudha Ragunathan, K. S. Chithra | 05:44 |
| "Porul Thedum Bhoomiyil" (Men) | P. Unnikrishnan | 04:25 |
| "Sariya Ithu Sariya" | K. S. Chithra | 05:15 |
| "Singapore Seela" | Mano | 04:51 |

== Reception ==
The magazine Kalki made a review as a discussion panel with people who were chosen to watch the preview of the film discussing with Balachander about the film. Shruti won the Filmfare Award for Best Actress – Tamil, and the Tamil Nadu State Film Award for Best Actress. Prakash Raj won the Tamil Nadu State Film Award for Best Villain.
