= Koodanayum Kattu =

- Directed by: I. V. Sasi
- Written by: John Paul
- Screenplay by: John Paul
- Produced by: Joseph Abraham
- Starring: Innocent; Mukesh; Rohini; Sankaradi
- Cinematography: Vasanth Kumar
- Edited by: K. Narayanan
- Music by: Shyam
- Production company: Prakkattu Films
- Distributed by: Prakkattu Films
- Release date: 31 October 1986
- Country: India
- Language: Malayalam

Koodanayum Kattu is a 1986 Indian Malayalam-language film, directed by I. V. Sasi and produced by Joseph Abraham. The film stars Innocent, Rahman, Mukesh, Rohini and Sankaradi. The film has musical score by Shyam.

== Plot ==
The movie switches between flashback and present. The movie begins at present, with a boat journey in Kerala with writer Radhamani, Annie and Annie's daughter who have come to Kerala from Bombay for a small tour. They are neighbors in Bombay. Their return flight ticket booked was cancelled by Radhamani as she wants a ship journey, which she has been wanting for years. They plan to get down at Goa and spend some time there before returning to Bombay.

They board the ship, which is the same ship that was boarded by Annie and her friends on a trip to one of their college hostel mate Liza's house in Goa, during their college days five years ago. During that journey that they meet Tommy and James, who were also travelling to Goa. They have a small tit for tat fight in the ship and get down at Goa. By then, Tommy and Annie have a soft corner for each other. Things fall easy for them as Annie's friends house is next to the hotel where Tommy and James stay. They both befriend Liza's parents. In course of time, Annie and Tommy, as well as James and Liza falls in love as they explore Goa. Tommy had to travel to Bombay to meet his father for some business requirements and both James and Tommy leave to Bombay in the bullet purchased from Liza's father, promising to return within 4 days. Annie's wait goes in vain as Tommy never returns even after many days and feels cheated and returns to Kerala to pursue her studies. However, she had to discontinue her studies as she discovers that she was pregnant and her mother too dies of this shock, leaving her all alone. Her mother's sister, who came for the funeral takes her to Bombay, where she gave birth to her daughter and gets employed over there.

And now, Tommy happens to see their (Radhamani, Annie and Annie's daughter's) picture published in newspaper, and follows them to the ship for this journey. They meet at the ship. Charlie is the room boy/waiter at the ship. Tommy tries to meet Annie a few times to justify himself, but Annie never wants to listen as he had ditched her. As Annie tells Tommy that the girl with her is her daughter, and the daughter's father awaits them at Goa, Tommy was shocked and tells her that he will be shifting to Frankfurt (where he is the heir of his father's business) and will never ever come to her life. They drop down at Goa and Tommy travels to Bombay for his departure to Frankfurt.

Why Tommy didn't come back to meet Annie after four days, and whether Annie can forgive Tommy for the reason behind the same forms the climax.

== Cast ==
- Rahman as Tommy
- Seetha as Annie
- Seema as Radhamani
- Mukesh as James
- Rohini as Liza
- Innocent as Charlie
- Sankaradi
- Sukumari

== Soundtrack ==
The music of the film was composed by Shyam and the lyrics were written by Bichu Thirumala.

No.	Song	Singers	Lyrics	Length (m:ss)
1	"Aashamsakal"	K. J. Yesudas, K. S. Chithra, Chorus	Bichu Thirumala	
2	"Chandrolsavamaam"	K. J. Yesudas	Bichu Thirumala	
3	"Kikkiliyude Muthellaam"	K. J. Yesudas	Bichu Thirumala	
4	"Moovanthi Mekham"	K. J. Yesudas, K. S. Chithra, Chorus	Bichu Thirumala	
