= Ariyaatha Veethikal =

- Poster designed by P. N. Menon
- Directed by: K. S. Sethumadhavan
- Screenplay by: John Paul
- Produced by: Raju Mathew
- Starring: Madhu; Mohanlal; Mammootty; Ramachandran; Rahman
- Cinematography: Vipin Mohan
- Edited by: M. S. Mani
- Music by: M. S. Viswanathan
- Production company: Century
- Distributed by: Century Films
- Release date: 23 November 1984
- Country: India
- Language: Malayalam

Ariyaatha Veethikal (transl. Unknown lanes) is a 1984 Indian Malayalam-language film directed by K. S. Sethumadhavan and written by John Paul. It stars Madhu, Mohanlal, Mammootty, Ramachandran and Rahman. The soundtrack of the film was composed by M. S. Viswanathan.

== Plot ==
The film revolves around Judge Jaganathan (Madhu), who stands by his morals, no matter what kind of problems he faces.

== Cast ==
- Madhu as Judge Jaganathan
- Mohanlal as Balan
- Mammootty as Ravi
- Ramachandran as Shekarankutty
- Manian Pillai Raju as Soman
- Rahman as Babu
- Karamana Janardhanan Nair as Bhaskaran
- Rohini as Sheela
- Sabitha Anand as Ambili
- Sukumari as Kalyanikutty
- Kaviyoor Ponnamma as Janaki
- Kalashala Babu as Raghavan

== Soundtrack ==
The music was composed by M. S. Viswanathan and the lyrics were written by P. Bhaskaran and Poovachal Khader.

No.	Song	Singers	Lyrics	Length (m:ss)
1	"Neeyalla Neethipaalan"	K. J. Yesudas	P. Bhaskaran	
2	"Sindooramekhangal"	P. Jayachandran	Poovachal Khader	
