= Anbulla Appa =

1987 film

- Theatrical release poster
- Directed by: A. C. Tirulokchandar
- Screenplay by: Aaroor Dass (dialogues)
- Story by: Vijaykumar
- Produced by: M. Saravanan; M. Balasubramaniam
- Starring: Sivaji Ganesan; Rahman; Nadhiya
- Cinematography: M. Viswanath Rai
- Edited by: D. Vasu
- Music by: Shankar–Ganesh
- Production company: AVM Productions
- Release date: 16 May 1987
- Running time: 137 minutes
- Country: India
- Language: Tamil

Anbulla Appa (transl. Dear Father) is a 1987 Indian Tamil-language drama film directed by A. C. Tirulokchandar for AVM Productions. The film stars Sivaji Ganesan, Nadhiya and Rahman. This was Tirulokchandar's last directorial venture before his retirement from films.

== Plot ==
The story explores the complex relationship between a father, portrayed by Shivaji Ganesan, and his daughter, played by Nadiya, which leads to complications after her marriage due to her prioritizing her relationship with her father over her husband.

== Cast ==
- Sivaji Ganesan
- Rahman
- Nadhiya
- Sangeeta
- Jai Ganesh
- V. K. Ramasamy
- Manorama
- Y. G. Mahendran
- Vinu Chakravarthy

== Soundtrack ==
The music was composed by Shankar–Ganesh, with lyrics by Vairamuthu. The song "Maragathavallikku" is set in Brindavani Sarang raga.

Song	Singers
"Anbu Thaye Anbu Thaye"	K. J. Yesudas
"Maragatha Vallikku Manakkolam"	K. J. Yesudas
"Aththaikku Piranthaval Medhaikku"	K. J. Yesudas, S. P. Sailaja
"Idhu Paal Vadiyum Mugam"	K. J. Yesudas, S. P. Sailaja
"Anbulla Appa Ennappa"	S. P. Balasubrahmanyam, S. P. Sailaja

== Reception ==
The Indian Express said, "Anbulla Appa anchors itself on the Sivaji-Nadiya equation not giving itself room even for lateral movement for plot development." Jayamanmadhan of Kalki praised the performances of Sivaji Ganesan and Nadhiya and also praised Vinu Chakravarthy and Manorama's humour and Shankar–Ganesh's music. The film did not do well at the box office and eventually became the final collaboration between Ganesan and Tirulokchandar.
