= Ajith Kollam =

Indian actor

- Born: Ajith Kumar Haridasan; 7 April 1962; Kottayam, Kerala, India
- Died: 5 April 2018 (aged 55)
- Occupation: Film actor
- Years active: 1984–2018
- Spouse: Prameela Ajith
- Children: 2

Ajith Kollam (7 April 1962 – 5 April 2018) was an Indian actor, who predominantly appeared in Malayalam cinema. He had acted in more than 500 films in all South Indian languages. He mainly acted in villain roles. He acted in the Tamil movie Airport (1993).

== Background ==
Ajith Kumar Haridas hailed from Kottayam, Kerala. He was one of six children born to Haridasan and Devakiamma in 1962. His father was a railway officer and mother was a house wife. He completed his primary education at Krist Raj High School, Kollam and Bachelors in Arts Degree from Sree Narayana College, Kollam.

Since his father was a Railway Station Master who was working at Kollam, he was brought up at Kadappakada in Kollam and adopted Kollam as the suffix for his name.

He went to the director Padmarajan to become an assistant director but, seeing his talent, Padmarajan cast him in his movie Parannu Parannu Parannu, and thus made his debut in a Malayalam movie in 1984. After that, he was a permanent actor in all Padmarajan movies. He turned director and scriptwriter in the Malayalam movie Calling Bell.

== Family ==
He was married to Prameela. The couple has a daughter Gayathri and a son Sreehari. They are residing in Kochi. The Malayalam film director Anil Das is his brother.

== Death ==
He died on 5 April 2018 from a stomach-related illness in Amrita Hospital in Kochi. He was 56 years old at the time of death. His funeral took place at his native place Kollam.

== Partial filmography ==
Year	Title	Role	Notes
1984	Parannu Parannu Parannu		
1985	Ee Thalamura Ingane		
1985	Akalathe Ambili	Aravind	
1986	Adiverukal	Attapadi Somu	
1986	Yuvajanotsavam	Das	
1986	Poovinu Puthiya Poonthennal	Gunda	
1986	Veendum	Robert's henchman	
1986	Naale Njangalude Vivaham		
1987	Naalkavala		
1987	Vrutham		
1987	Nadodikkattu	Nambiar's henchman	
1987	Irupatham Noottandu	Kasim	
1988	1921	Kunjalavi	
1988	Aparan	Criminal's accomplice	
1988	Pattanapravesham		
1988	Manu Uncle		
1989	Vaadaka Gunda		
1989	Agnipravesham	Venukumar	
1989	Jaathakam		
1989	Nagarangalil Chennu Raparkam	Chettiyar's Goonda	
1989	Kaalal Pada	Kareem	
1989	Mahayanam		
1990	Samrajyam		
1990	No.20 Madras Mail	Goon	
1990	Lal Salam		
1991	Bhoomika		
1991	Abhimanyu		
1991	Oru Prathyeka Ariyippu		
1992	Aardram	Pandiyan	
1992	Sooryachakram		
1993	Airport		Tamil film
1995	Nirnayam	Peethambaran	
1995	Spadikam	Georgekutty	
1996	Hit List		
1997	Aaraam Thampuran	Prabhu	
1997	Asuravamsam		
1997	Virasat	Inspector	Hindi film
1998	Illamura Tampuran		
1998	British Market		
1999	Friends	Goonda	
1999	Olympian Anthony Adam	Sub Inspector Vivek	
2000	Mark Antony	S. I. Jagannathan	
2000	Valliettan	Marodi Abu	
2000	Narasimham	Vasudevan	
2000	Daivathinte Makan	Constable Ponnappan	
2001	Ee Nadu Innale Vare	Pappy	
2001	Sooryachakram		
2002	Kanmashi		
2002	Sthree Vesham		
2003	Chronic Bachelor		
2003	Balettan		
2004	Sethurama Iyer CBI	Sub-inspector	
2004	Vettam	Abdullah	
2005	Bharathchandran I.P.S.	Udayan Shetty	
2005	Pandippada	Murugan	
2005	Boyy Friennd	CI Georgekutty	
2005	The Tiger	Nasser	
2006	Prajapathi	Kunjachan	
2006	Don		
2006	Red Salute	Muniswamy	
2006	Yes Your Honour	Gopikrishnan's friend	
2006	Avan Chandiyude Makan	Si Hari	
2007	Nagaram	S. I. Sugunan	
2007	Mission 90 Days	Inspector Raghoothaman	
2007	Kichamani MBA		
2008	Twenty:20		
2008	LollyPop		
2009	2 Harihar Nagar		
2009	Gulumaal: The Escape		
2010	Thanthonni		
2010	Nallavan		
2010	Chekavar	Musthafa	
2010	Advocate Lakshmanan – Ladies Only		
2010	Kootukar	DYSP Idiyan Narayanan	
2011	Note Out		
2011	China Town		
2011	Manushyamrugam		
2011	Teja Bhai & Family	Srank	
2012	Kunjaliyan		
2012	No.66 Madhura Bus		
2012	Simhasanam	Razool Musthafa	
2012	Ardhanaari		
2013	Blackberry		
2014	Alice a True Story		
2016	Calling Bell		Also director
2017	Neeranjanapookkal		
2017	Pakal Pole		
