= Katha Ithuvare =

- Poster
- Directed by: Joshiy
- Written by: A. R. Mukesh; Kaloor Dennis (dialogues)
- Screenplay by: Kaloor Dennis
- Produced by: Joy Thomas
- Starring: Madhu; Mammootty; Rahman; Thilakan; Suhasini; Rohini
- Cinematography: C. E. Babu
- Edited by: K. Sankunni
- Music by: Johnson
- Production company: Jubilee Productions
- Distributed by: Jubilee Productions
- Release date: 1 May 1985
- Country: India
- Language: Malayalam

Katha Ithuvare is a 1985 Indian Malayalam film, directed by Joshiy and produced by Joy Thomas. The film stars Madhu, Mammootty, Rahman, Thilakan, Suhasini and Rohini in the lead roles. The film has musical score by Johnson. The film went on to become a superhit.

== Cast ==
- Madhu
- Mammootty As Balan
- Rahman
- Suhasini As Rekha
- Rohini
- Thilakan
- Baby Shalini
- Chithra As Susy
- Innocent
- Lalu Alex
- Kunjan
- Anandavally

== Soundtrack ==
The music was composed by Johnson and the lyrics were written by Poovachal Khader.

No.	Song	Singers	Lyrics	Length (m:ss)
1	"Cherunnu Njangalonnaay"	P. Jayachandran, C. O. Anto, Krishnachandran	Poovachal Khader	
2	"Mazhavillin Malarthedi"	K. J. Yesudas, K. S. Chithra	Poovachal Khader	
3	"Ragini Ragaroopini"	K. J. Yesudas, K. S. Chithra	Poovachal Khader	
