= Maalika Paniyunnavar =

1979 film by Sreekumaran Thampi

- Directed by: Sreekumaran Thampi
- Written by: Sreekumaran Thampi
- Screenplay by: Sreekumaran Thampi
- Produced by: Sreekumaran Thampi
- Starring: Sukumaran; Roja Ramani; Anandavally
- Edited by: G. Murali
- Music by: K. J. Yesudas; M. K. Arjunan
- Production company: Bhavani Rajeswari
- Distributed by: Bhavani Rajeswari
- Release date: 5 January 1979
- Country: India
- Language: Malayalam

Maalika Paniyunnavar is a 1979 Indian Malayalam film, directed and produced by Sreekumaran Thampi. The film stars Mahendran, Sukumaran and Anandavally in the lead roles. The film featured original songs composed by K. J. Yesudas and M. K. Arjunan.

== Plot synopsis ==
Kuttappan, a laborer, helps his friend's sister marry her lover, Krishnan. Later, when he finds that Krishnan has another family, he decides to take care of them.

== Cast ==
- Sukumaran as Kuttappan
- Anandavally as Devaki
- Geetha as Thresia
- Mallika Sukumaran as Meenakshi
- Nellikode Bhaskaran as Chellappan
- Roja Ramani as Kalyani
- Y. G. Mahendran as Krishnan Mesthiri
- P. K. Vanukuttan Nair as Paulose
- Maniyanpilla Raju as Ouseph
- Adoor Bhavani as Kuttappan's mother
- Kailas Nath as Appunni
- Payyannur Aravind
- Sasi Mesthiri
- Baby Vinodini as Meenakshi's daughter
- Master Prathapan as Meenakshi's son

== Soundtrack ==
The music was composed by K. J. Yesudas and M. K. Arjunan.

No.	Song	Singers	Lyrics	Length (m:ss)
1	"Ambilippoomalayil"	K. J. Yesudas	Sreekumaran Thampi	4:11
2	"Kaalikku Bharaninaalil"	K. J. Yesudas	Sreekumaran Thampi	3:04
3	"Sindooram Thudikkunna" (Resung from Chattambi Kalyani)	K. J. Yesudas	Sreekumaran Thampi	2:51
