= Rahman (actor) =

Indian actor (born 1967)

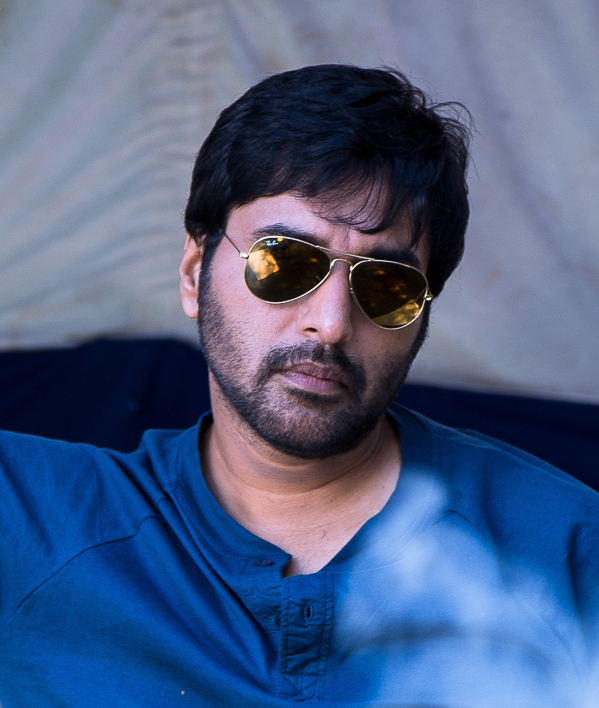
- Rahman seen in a film shoot
- Born: Rashin Rahman; 23 May 1967 (age 59); Abu Dhabi, Trucial States
- Other name: Raghu
- Occupation: Actor
- Years active: 1983–present
- Spouse: Meherunnisa (m. 1993)
- Children: 2

Rashin Rahman (born 23 May 1967), commonly known by his surname Rahman, is an Indian actor. He has worked in around 200 films, primarily in Malayalam cinema, in addition to Tamil, Hindi and Telugu cinema, and has won several awards. In Tamil and Telugu cinema, he is also known by the screen names Raghuman and Raghu.

He made his acting debut in Koodevide (1983), for which he won his first Kerala State Film Award for Second Best Actor. He was a popular teen idol in Malayalam cinema during the 1980s, which heightened his stardom in Malayalam film industry. He eventually shifted to playing lead roles in Tamil and Telugu films during the late 1980s and early 1990s. He made a comeback to Malayalam films in 2004.

== Early life ==
Rahman was born as Rashin on 23 May 1967 in Abu Dhabi. His family originally hails from Nilambur, Kerala, India. He is eldest of two children of K. M. A. Rahman and Savithri. He has a younger sister Shameema. He was educated at Merryland Kindergarten, Abu Dhabi and Baldwin Boys' High School, Bangalore, St Joseph's School in Abu Dhabi and Rex Higher Secondary School, Ooty and pursued a pre-university degree at Dr. Gafoor Memorial MES Mampad College, Mampad-Malappuram.

== Career ==
=== Malayalam films ===
In 1983, Rahman, while still in high school in Ooty, was spotted by noted Malayalam director Padmarajan who offered him the lead role in his film Koodevide. The film became a big hit and the teenager became an instant sensation. He was well appreciated for his acting and went on to win the Kerala State Award for Second Best Actor in his debut role at the age of 16. In 1984, he acted in Kaliyil Alpam Karyam directed by Sathyan Anthikad and Ithiri Poove Chuvannapoove by Bharathan. He won critical acclaim and awards for the performance in the latter. In the same year, he acted in Kanamarayathu directed by I.V. Sasi, which went on to become a critical and commercial success. The song Oru Madhurakinavin, which is picturised on him and Shobana, became very popular and was a chartbuster all over Kerala. It is considered an iconic dance number in Malayalam cinema even today.

In the same year, he acted in Padmarajan's Parannu Parannu Parannu alongside Rohini. He was then seen in I. V. Sasi's thriller film Uyarangalil, Adiyozhukkukal and K. S. Sethumadhavan's family drama Ariyaatha Veethikal. He then acted in another film of Sathyan Anthikad titled Aduthaduthu, and J. Sasikumar's Ivide Thudangunnu alongside Rohini.

In the first half of 1985, he acted in Kandu Kandarinju, I. V. Sasi's Angadikkappurathu, and Upaharam. By this time Rahman had gained a huge fan base and stardom in Malayalam film industry. He was then seen in Sajan's Thammil Thammil alongside Shobana, Ee Lokam Evide Kure Manushyar and Orikkal Oridathu alongside Rohini. In the second half of 1985, he starred in romantic film Ivide Ee Theerathu, Ente Kaanakkuyil, Koodum Thedi and Katha Ithuvare. Then he acted in Eeran Sandhya, Ee Thanalil Ithiri Nerum and Priyadarshan's Punnaram Cholli Cholli, all of which went on to become commercially successful. In 1986, he acted in I. V. Sasi's super hit film Vartha along with Mammootty, Mohanlal and Seema and a cameo appearance in Aayiram Kannukal. Then, he went on to act in the title role of Nathan in Ennu Nathante Nimmi. He acted in Chilambu directed by Bharathan, which is a martial arts movie and it went on to become big hit at the box office. His next release of the year was Poomukhappadiyil Ninneyum Kaathu, Koodanayum Kattu, Pappan Priyappetta Pappan and P. Padmarajan's crime thriller Kariyilakkattu Pole.

In 1987, he starred in I. V. Sasi's family drama Ithrayum Kaalam and Sathyan Anthikad directorial Gaayathridevi Ente Amma along with Seema. His next release was Aankiliyude Tharattu which was also dubbed into Tamil language. His first release of 1988 was Moonnam Pakkam, a sentimental drama film directed by Padmarajan and then Mukthi by I. V. Sasi. Then, he played dual roles in the thriller film Charithram which was commercially and critically appreciated. Then, he acted in Kaalal Pada along with Jayaram and Suresh Gopi. He acted in the films of almost all the major Malayalam directors at that time including Padmarajan, Bharathan, and I. V. Sasi. He was absent from the Malayalam film industry in the early 1990s as he concentrated on Tamil and Telugu films.

He had only one release in Malayalam during 1990, Veena Meettiya Vilangukal directed by Cochin Haneefa. After a long absence, he acted in Mazhavilkoodaram, King Soloman and Hitlist during the early 1990s. He came back with the movie Dreams, playing the role of a police officer. In 2004, he acted in Black, alongside Mammootty. During 2005 and 2006 he acted in films such as Rajamanikyam, Mahasamudram and Bhargavacharitham Moonam Khandam. He had four Malayalam film releases in 2007, Abraham & Lincoln and Nanma, along with Kalabhavan Mani. He then acted in director Kamal's film Goal and Ranjith's Rock & Roll. In 2008, he did a cameo role in Veruthe oru Bharya. In 2009, he acted in Moss & Cat, directed by Fazil with Dileep as his co-star and Bharya Onnu Makkal Moonnu.

Rahman then appeared in the film Kerala Cafe, in the segment titled "Island Express", under the director Shankar RamaKrishnan. Musafir, produced by Pramod Pappan, is one of Rahman's biggest productions and most expensive ventures to date. Then in 2011, he acted in Traffic, a multi-narrative road thriller film written by his friends Bobby and Sanjay. His next theatrical release was Manjadikuru written and directed by Anjali Menon. In 2012, he acted in Bachelor Party, a gangster drama film directed by Amal Neerad.

He was then seen in one of the lead roles along with Prithviraj Sukumaran and Jayasurya in the 2013 film Mumbai Police. Penned by Bobby and Sanjay and directed by Rosshan Andrrews, it was a huge financial success in Kerala. In 2015, he played the lead role in Lavender written by Anoop Menon. He then starred in the 2016 film Marupadi directed by V.M. Vinu.

In 2018, he featured in the action thriller film Ranam along with Prithviraj Sukumaran and was appreciated for his performance as a drug lord. In 2019, he starred in Virus, a medical thriller film directed by Aashiq Abu set against the backdrop of the 2018 Nipah virus outbreak in Kerala.

He also acted for the graphic novel style newspaper movie 'Locked Inn' published in malayala manorama newspaper in 2020 along with Jayasurya.

=== Tamil and Telugu films ===
Rahman's first Tamil film was Nilave Malare, which was released in 1986; the director of the film was S. A. Chandrasekhar. He subsequently appeared in Kanne Kaniyamuthe, Vasantha Raagam and Anbulla Appa (with Sivaji Ganeshan).

In 1999, he acted in the Tamil film Sangamam, directed by Suresh Krishna, which depicts the feud between classical and folk dance. The music of the film was composed by A. R. Rahman. The Tamil film Ethiri (2004) was the first film Rahman dubbed for in his own voice. In 2005, after a long gap in Telugu, Rahman acted in Dhairyam (2005), a film that was well received. Rahman then performed in the Tamil films Raam and Thoothukudi, which were released in 2005 and 2006 respectively. He played the villain in Billa (2007), and reprised his role as the main antagonist in the Telugu film of the same name, released in 2009.

After his debut with Suhasini as the heroine, he worked with her again after a gap of 25 years for the Tamil movie, Balam (2009). His next film Vaamanan, directed by Ahmed (who has worked as assistant to director Kathir), did well throughout South India. Rahman's next Telugu film Simha was released worldwide on 30 April 2010. It went on to become the highest grosser of 2010, and the 5th highest-grossing movie in the Telugu Film Industry. He then appeared in Oosaravelli and Vanthaan Vendraan. In 2014, he acted as the protagonist's father in the movie Govindudu Andarivadele, directed by Krishna Vamsi. In 2016, he starred in the Tamil-language thriller film Dhuruvangal Pathinaaru. He also played the main roles in Pagadi Aattam (2017) and Oru Mugathirai (2017). He played Madhurantakan in the historical fiction epic drama, Ponniyin Selvan: I (2022) directed by Mani Ratnam.

== Awards ==
Rahman won the State Award for Best Supporting Actor for his performance in his first film, Koodevide. He also won the Film Critics Award and Chamber Award for this role.

In 1984, he won the Kerala Film Chamber Award for Best Actor for the film Ithiri Poove Chuvanna Poove.

Rahman won the Trendsetter Award in Malayalam cinema at the Etisalat Everest Film awards held in Dubai in 2007. The public voted for Rahman from nominees including Kamal Haasan, Sreedevi, Manju Warrier and Nadhiya.

Rahman's Malayalam film Manjadikkuru, directed by Anjali Menon, won two awards at the 2008 International Film Festival in Kerala.

- Kerala State Film Awards: Second Best Actor – Koodevide (1983)
- Kerala Film Critics Award for Second Best Actor – Ithiri Poove Chuvanna Poove (1984)
- Kerala Film Chamber Award for Best Actor – Ithiri Poove Chuvanna Poove (1984)
- Award for Trendsetter in the history of Malayalam cinema's 78 years at the Etisalat Everest Film awards held in Dubai - (2007)
- Padmarajan Award for Lifetime Achievement – (2015)
- Asianet Film Award for Best Actor in Negative Role – Ranam (2018)

== Filmography ==
Key
†	Denotes films that have not yet been released

=== Malayalam ===
List of Rahman Malayalam film credits
Year	Title	Character	Notes
1983	Koodevide	Ravi Puthooran	
1984	Kaliyil Alpam Karyam	Babu	
1984	Ithiri Poove Chuvannapoove	Unni	
1984	Kanamarayathu	Baby	
1984	Parannu Parannu Parannu	Emil	
1984	Ariyaatha Veethikal	Babu	
1984	Uyarangalil	Chandran	
1984	Adiyozhukkukal	Chandran	
1984	Aduthaduthu	Raju	
1984	Ivide Thudhagunnu	Babu	
1985	Kandu Kandarinju	Kunjunni	
1985	Angadikkappurathu	Charley	
1985	Upaharam	Ajit Chandran	
1985	Ee Lokam Evide Kure Manushyar	Balu	
1985	Orikkal Oridathu	Sethu	
1985	Ivide Ee Theerathu	Gopinath	
1985	Ente Kaanakkuyil	Suresh	
1985	Koodum Thedi	Rex	
1985	Katha Ithuvare	Vinayan	
1985	Thammil Thammil	Vivek	
1985	Eeran Sandhya	Raju	
1985	Gaayathridevi Ente Amma	Appu	
1985	Ee Thanalil Ithiri Nerum	Ravi	
1985	Punnaram Cholli Cholli	Biju	
1986	Vartha	Unnikrishnan	
1986	Aayiram Kannukal	Band Troupe Singer	Cameo
1986	Ennu Nathante Nimmi	Nathan	
1986	Chilambu	Paramu	
1986	Poomukhappadiyil Ninneyum Kaathu	Sanjay / Sanju	
1986	Koodanayum Kattu	Tommy	
1986	Pappan Priyappetta Pappan	Pappan	
1986	Kariyilakkattupole	Anil Kumar	
1986	Onnam Prathi Olivil	-	
1987	Ithrayum Kalam	Pappachan	
1987	Aankiliyude Tharattu	Babu	
1988	Moonnam Pakkam	Lopez	
1988	Mukthi	Sudhakaran	
1989	Charithram	Raju Manavalan / Albert	Dual role
1989	Kaalal Pada	Sunny	
1992	Apaaratha	Prathapan	
1995	Mazhavilkoodaram	Jithin Babu	
2000	Dreamz	Peter	
2004	Black	Ashok Srinivas	
2005	Rajamanikyam	Raju	
2006	Mahha Samudram	Rarichan	
2006	Bhargava Charitham Moonam Khandam	Vinod	
2007	Rock & Roll	Henry	
2007	Goal	Vijay	
2007	Nanma	Nakulan	
2007	Abraham & Lincoln	Lincoln George	
2008	Veruthe Oru Bharya	SP Sudeep	
2009	Kerala Cafe / Island Express	Ranji	
2009	Bharya Onnu Makkal Moonnu	Raju	
2009	Moss & Cat	Sumesh Vasudev	
2011	Traffic	Sidharth Shankar	
2012	Manjadikuru	Raghu Maaman	
2012	Bachelor Party	Benny	
2013	Musafir	Humayoon/Musafir	
2013	Mumbai Police	Commissioner Farhan Aman	
2015	Lavender	Ayaan/Ajay	
2016	Marupadi	Eby	
2018	Ranam	Damodar Ratnam	
2019	Virus	Dr. Rahim	
2023	Samara	Antony	
2024	Bad Boyz	Mekkattukulam Antappan	
2026	Anomie	Gibran	

=== Tamil ===
List of Rahman Tamil film credits
Year	Film	Role	Notes
1986	Nilave Malare	Vijay	
1986	Kanne Kaniyamuthe	Peraka	
1986	Vasantha Raagam	Raghu	
1987	Meendum Mahaan	Raghu	
1987	Anbulla Appa	Madhu	
1988	Oruvar Vazhum Aalayam	Jeeva	
1989	Pudhu Pudhu Arthangal	Mani Bharathi	
1990	Aarathi Edungadi	Kannan	
1990	Pattikattan	Muthuraasa	
1990	Pagalil Pournami	Rajasekar's brother	
1990	Pattanamdhan Pokalamadi	Balu	
1990	Manaivi Vantha Neram	Sudhakar	
1990	Seetha	Vijay	
1990	Puriyaadha Pudhir	Raghu	credited as Raghu
1991	Pudhiya Raagam	Raja	
1991	Nee Pathi Naan Pathi	Nandha	
1991	Paattondru Ketten	Raghu	
1992	Thambi Pondatti	Somu	
1992	Naane Varuven	Raja	
1992	Mappillai Vanthachu	Ranga	
1993	Pon Vilangu	Raghu	
1993	Athma	Raghu	
1993	Udan Pirappu	Viji	
1993	Karuppu Vellai	Surya	
1994	Athiradi Padai	Saatha	
1994	Hero	Ramu	
1995	Paattu Padava	Rishi	
1995	Dear Son Maruthu	Maruthu	
1996	Kalki	Paranjothi	
1996	Vasantham	Ganesh	
1999	Suryodayam	Bala	
1999	Sangamam	Selvam	
2001	Ninaikkatha Naalillai	Arun	
2004	Ethiri	Raghavan	
2005	Raam	Umar	
2006	Thoothukudi	Lingam	
2006	Kasu	Karan	
2007	Billa	Jagdish / Gokulnath	
2007	Kuttrapathirikai	Arun	
2009	Balam	Abhishek	
2009	Vaamanan	John Vijay	
2011	Vandhan Vendran	Commissioner of Mumbai	
2011	Lathika	Anthony	
2012	Billa II	Jagdish	
2013	Singam II	Thangaraj	
2014	Ennamo Nadakkudhu	Burma	
2015	En Vazhi Thani Vazhi	Thangaraj	
2015	36 Vayadhinile	Tamizhselvan	
2016	Kuttrame Thandanai	Vijay Prakash	
2016	Dhuruvangal Pathinaaru	Deepak	
2017	Pagadi Aattam	Devendrakumar	
2017	Oru Mugathirai	Sathyamoorthy Rathnavel	
2017	Sathura Adi 3500	Police inspector	
2019	Seven	Vijay Prakash	
2022	Ponniyin Selvan: I	Madhurantakan	
2023	Ponniyin Selvan: II	Madhurantakan	
2024	Anjaamai	Adv. Manikkam	
2024	Nirangal Moondru	Vasanth	

=== Telugu ===
List of Rahman Telugu film credits
Year	Title	Role	Notes
1987	Raga Leela		
1991	Bharat Bandh		
1992	Priyathama		
1993	Aadarsham	Chakrapani	
1993	Repati Rowdy		
2000	Sri Srimathi Sathyabhaama		
2005	Dhairyam	Somaraju	
2009	Billa	Devil/Dharmendra	
2010	Simha	Jagadish Prasad	
2011	Oosaravelli	DCP Vikram Sinha(as mentioned in news)	
2012	Adhinayakudu	Rama Krishna Prasad's brother	
2013	Shatruvu	Mayor Aravind	
2014	Govindudu Andarivadele	Dr. Chandrasekhar Rao	
2016	Janatha Garage	Shiva	
2018	Antariksham 9000 KMPH	ISC Mission Control Director Chandra Kanth	
2019	Seven	Police Officer Vijay Prakash	
2021	Seetimaarr	DCP Aravind	

=== Hindi ===
Year	Title	Role	Notes
2023	Ganapath	Shiva	

== Web series ==
Year	Title	Role	Notes
2024	1000 Babies	Aji Kurian	Disney+ Hotstar

== Television ==
Year	Title	Role	Language	Platform	Notes
1996-1998	Kadhal Pagadai	Ramana	Tamil	Sun TV	
1997	Chinna Kuyli		Tamil	DD Tamil	
2010	Super Jodi	Judge	Malayalam	Surya TV	
2013	Jagritha		Malayalam	Kairali TV	
