= Ivide Ee Theerathu =

- Directed by: P. G. Vishwambharan
- Written by: Antony Eastman; John Paul (dialogues)
- Screenplay by: John Paul
- Produced by: Augustine Prakash
- Starring: Rahman; Madhu; Srividya; Rohini; K. P. Ummer
- Cinematography: Ramachandra Babu
- Edited by: G. Venkittaraman
- Music by: A. T. Ummer
- Production company: Santhosh Creations
- Distributed by: Santhosh Creations
- Release date: 14 August 1985
- Country: India
- Language: Malayalam

Ivide Ee Theerathu is a 1985 Indian Malayalam film, directed by P. G. Vishwambharan and produced by Augustine Prakash. The film stars Rahman, Madhu, Srividya, Rohini and K. P. Ummer in the lead roles. The film has musical score by A. T. Ummer.

== Cast ==
- Rahman as Gopinath
- Madhu as Prof. P. N. Thampi
- Srividya as Madhaviyamma
- Rohini as Sreedevi
- K. P. Ummer as Keshava Kaimal
- Jose Prakash as Principal Father
- Santhosh as Raju
- James as Thomas
- Sasikumar as Sasi
- Beena Sabu as Annamma
- Innocent as Adv. Lonappan
- Ahalya as Shantha
- KPAC Sunny as Barrister Das

== Soundtrack ==
The music was composed by A. T. Ummer and the lyrics were written by Bichu Thirumala.

No.	Song	Singers	Lyrics	Length (m:ss)
1	"Illikkombil"	P. Jayachandran, Chorus	Bichu Thirumala	
2	"Kannil Nilaavu"	K. G. Markose	Bichu Thirumala	
