= Parannu Parannu Parannu =

- Poster designed by Gayathri Ashokan
- Directed by: P. Padmarajan
- Written by: P. Padmarajan
- Produced by: Premprakash
- Starring: Rahman; Rohini; Nedumudi Venu; Bhagyasri
- Cinematography: Ashok Kumar
- Edited by: B. Lenin
- Music by: Johnson
- Production company: Prekshaka
- Distributed by: Prekshaka
- Release date: 25 February 1984
- Country: India
- Language: Malayalam

Parannu Parannu Parannu (transl. Soaring Soaring Soaring) is a 1984 Indian Malayalam-language film, written and directed by P. Padmarajan. It stars Rahman, Rohini and Nedumudi Venu in pivotal roles.

== Plot ==
Elizabeth is a physical education instructor at a college and lives with her son Emil and unmarried brother Vakkachan. She is well loved and respected by her students. When she retires, students suggest that she start a beauty parlour to keep her active and be in touch with them. Emil, who wants to upgrade his still photography business to videography and Vakkachan who wants to expand his pawn brokerage are apprehensive at first, but then decide to help out. They start Eve's beauty parlour at home with great fanfare. But the appointed beautician turns out to be completely incompetent, with some disastrous skin rash and hair dye incidents. Even her beloved students avoid her and an upset Elizabeth dismisses the beautician. Emil is sympathetic and advertises for a beautician through newspapers.

Elizabeth's fortune changes for good when a professional and skilled girl Mini turns up and soon the place is filled with customers. Emil is smitten by Mini at first sight, but even though she is attracted to him, she keeps her distance, and this makes Emil suspect that Mini is afraid and hiding something. The business flourishes, with Mini at the helm, and they expand to a health club, move into a new place and Emil starts his video studio nearby. He puts up advertisements of the beauty clinic with Mini's pictures without her consent. She is furious and threatens to quit until the advertisements are removed. Emil does that but his concern that she is hiding something grows. This is soon cemented when some people come enquiring about her and say that Mini has escaped from her last employer with stolen valuables. Mini reveals the truth and comes clean.

Even though their romance is growing, certain incidents lead Emil to believe that there are more secrets in Mini's past. Emil decides to find out the truth, and puts up a big first page advertisement of his studio in the newspaper with Mini's picture. Two men come searching for her and Mini is distraught. What is she trying to escape from? What will the door to the past reveal? Will she escape from the clutches of her searchers? What will happen to Emil and Mini's romance? Answers to these questions form the remainder of the story.

== Cast ==
- Rahman as Emil
- Rohini as Mini / Jessy / Sreekutty
- Nedumudi Venu as Vakkachan
- Bhagyasri as Charulatha
- Sukumari as Elizabeth
- Jose Prakash as Sreekantan Nair
- K. R. Vijaya as Susan
- Jagathi Sreekumar
- Lizy as Sudha
- Anju as Jessy / Sreekutty
- Kunchan as Damu
- Kothuku Nanappan as Menon
- Azeez as Ananthan
- Ajith Kollam

== Soundtrack ==
The music was composed by Johnson with lyrics by O. N. V. Kurup.

No.	Song	Singers	Lyrics	Length (m:ss)
1	"Karimizhikkuruvikal"	K. J. Yesudas, S. Janaki	O. N. V. Kurup	4:34
2	"Thaalamaay Varoo"	S. Janaki, Chorus	O. N. V. Kurup	4:50
