= Thammil Thammil =

- Promotional poster designed by Kitho
- Directed by: Sajan
- Produced by: Thomas Mathew
- Starring: Mammootty; Rahman; Shobana; Thilakan
- Cinematography: Anandakuttan
- Music by: Ravindran
- Release date: 22 February 1985
- Country: India
- Language: Malayalam

Thammil Thammil is a 1985 Indian Malayalam-language film, directed by Sajan and produced by Thomas Mathew. The film stars Mammootty, Rahman, Shobhana and Thilakan. The film has musical score by Ravindran.

== Cast ==
- Mammootty as Dr. Rajagopal
- Archana as Gayathri
- Rahman as Vivek Menon
- Shobana as Kavitha
- Jose as Dr. Prasad
- Raveendran as Thampy
- Kannor Sreelatha as Sunitha Menon
- Jagathy Sreekumar as Const. Fransis
- Kunchan as Const. Chettiyar
- Thilakan as Menon
- Sukumari as Saraswathy Menon
- Lalu Alex
- Sankaradi
- Adoor Bhavani
- Meena
- Lissy in a cameo appearance

== Plot ==
Vivek, a talented dancer and singer, meets Kavitha during one of his performances and takes a liking to her. She is the sister of Dr Rajagopal. When Vivek's sister marries a police inspector and Vivek learns that they are searching for a house for rent, he manages to get the house opposite Rajagopal's in order to meet Kavitha. After several meetings their love blossoms.

== Soundtrack ==
Music: Raveendran, Lyrics: Poovachal Khader

- "Hridayam Oru Veenayaay" - K. J. Yesudas
- "Ithiri Naanam" - K. J. Yesudas, Lathika
- "Kadanam Oru Saagaram" - K. J. Yesudas
- "Nishayude Chirakil" - K. J. Yesudas
