= Rock n' Roll (2007 film) =

Rock N' Roll
- Theatrical release poster
- Directed by: Ranjith
- Written by: Ranjith
- Produced by: P. N. Venugopal
- Starring: Mohanlal; Lakshmi Rai; Siddique; Lal; Mukesh; Manoj K.Jayan; Rahman; Harisree Ashokan; Jagathy Sreekumar; Anoop Menon
- Narrated by: Ranjith
- Cinematography: Manoj Pillai
- Edited by: Ranjan Abraham
- Music by: Songs: Vidyasagar; Score: Bijibal
- Production company: P.N.V Associates
- Distributed by: Marikkar Films
- Release date: 9 November 2007
- Running time: 140 minutes
- Country: India
- Language: Malayalam

Rock N' Roll is a 2007 Indian Malayalam-language musical comedy film written and directed by Ranjith. The film stars Mohanlal, Lakshmi Rai, Siddique, Lal, Mukesh, Manoj K.Jayan, Rahman, Anoop Menon, Harisree Ashokan and Jagathy Sreekumar. The film tells the story of seven musicians in Chennai, the major centre of film production in South India. It was released on 9 November coinciding with Deepavali. It received negative reviews and was considered a commercial flop at the time of release. Over the years, the movie along with Mohanlal's performance has attained a cult status. Suraj Venjaramoodu's cameo role as a fraud musician was widely acclaimed and is often considered one of his early breakthroughs.

== Plot ==
The film tells the story of Chandramouli (Mohanlal), a composer and drummer, of his return to Chennai from South Africa for a brief visit and of the incidents happening in that short span. Gunasekharan (Siddique), a leading music composer, is busy with his composition for the latest film directed by Lal Jose. He feels that it would be better if he gets the help of his old friend, Chandramouli, who is now busy with his international concerts. But Mouli, a fun-loving and jovial musician, makes a surprise landing in Chennai and helps Guna in his work. Mouli falls in love with Daya Sreenivasan (Lakshmi Rai), a female playback singer, who is also an ardent fan of him. But because of the compulsion from her parents and fiancé, Vivek (Anoop Menon), she moves back to Mumbai. Mouli plots a plan with his friend, Thabala Balu, (Harisree Ashokan) to bring her back to Chennai. He convinces Daya that he is composing a dozen songs for a film and wants Daya to sing them. Daya comes back to Chennai but is not impressed by Mouli's tunes. When she openly expresses her unhappiness over the tune, Mouli takes it as a prestige issue and composes a song entirely dedicated to her. However, Daya is unable to reach the studio on that particular day because of her engagement ceremony with Vivek whom she feels is too arrogant and sophisticated for her. Knowing this, Mouli enters the engagement venue and takes Daya to the studio for half an hour despite the opposition from her family members. Daya, who is in love with Mouli, realizes his love for her and opens her mind to him. The film ends with Mouli relaxing at a beach with Daya but his old habits of carefree nature and passion for girls are still not gone.

== Cast ==
- Mohanlal as Chandramouli, an international drummer
- Siddique as Gunashekar, Music director
- Mukesh as Vishwanath (Vichan), a re-recordist
- Lal as Issac, a violinist
- Manoj K. Jayan as Gireeshan a.k.a. Saidapet Giri, an aspiring singer-turned don
- Rahman as Henry, a keyboardist
- Harisree Ashokan as Balachandran a.k.a. Tabala Balu, a tabalist
- Jagathy Sreekumar as Khader Khan
- Lakshmi Rai as Daya Sreenivas, a singer
- Anoop Menon as Vivek Sreenivas
- Suraj Venjaramoodu as PP Shiju a.k.a. Maharaja (extended cameo)
- Swetha Menon as Eleena
- Praveena as Maria
- Anil Murali as Satheeshan, Police Inspector
- Augustine as Production Controller Subramaniyam
- Rohini as Nirmala
- Joju George as Hari, Gangster of Saidapet Giri
- Dinesh Panicker as Sreenivas, Daya's father
- Chitra Shenoy as Daya's mother
- Sindhu Shyam
- Lal Jose as himself (cameo)
- Vanitha as Chandramouli's mother (cameo)

== Reception ==
The film received mostly negative reviews. On the other hand, the music was well received. Vidyasagar's music was popular, especially the song "Chandamama", which stayed on the charts for many weeks. The failure of the movie also resulted in a small spat between Mohanlal and director Ranjith, which continued till the duo came together for the hugely successful Spirit (2012).

== Soundtrack ==
Rock 'N' Roll

Soundtrack album by Vidyasagar
- Released: 3 November 2007
- Recorded: Varsha Vallaki Studios
- Genre: Feature Film Soundtrack
- Length: 21:25
- Language: Malayalam
- Label: Manorama Music
- Producer: Vidyasagar

Vidyasagar chronology
Goal (2007)	Rock 'N' Roll (2007)	Pirivom Santhippom (2008)

The film's background score is composed by Bijibal, while the songs are composed by Vidyasagar with lyrics written by Gireesh Puthenchery. The songs were very popular.

Song title	Singers
"Chandamama"	Anitha Shaiq, Rija, M. G. Sreekumar
"Jhiruthana"	Ranjith, Tippu
"Manchadi Mazha"	Madhu Balakrishnan, Sujatha
"Ravereyayi"	Madhu Balakrishnan
"Valayonnitha"	Vijay Yesudas, Ranjith, Jeemon KJ, Pradeep Palluruthy
Baby One Mre Time	Britney Spears

== Quotes ==
"Rock & Roll is an out and out musical entertainer set in Chennai milieu with the background of a recording studio and the world of musicians. It's a fun-filled movie with Mohanlal leading the pack of merry men." – director Ranjith
