= Orikkal Oridathu =

- Directed by: Jeassy
- Written by: John Paul
- Produced by: Suresh Babu
- Starring: Madhu; Prem Nazeer; M G Soman; Rahman; Sreevidya; Rohini
- Cinematography: Anandakuttan; Ramachandra Menon. C
- Edited by: K. Sankunni
- Music by: Raveendran
- Production company: New Films India
- Release date: 15 August 1985
- Country: India
- Language: Malayalam

Orikkal Oridathu is a 1985 Malayalam film directed by Jeassy, starring Madhu, Prem Naseer, Sreevidya, Rahman.

== Cast ==
- Rahman as Sethu
- Rohini as Soniya, Sethu's lover
- Prem Nazeer as Kesava Kurup, Sethu's uncle
- Madhu as Menon, Sethu's father
- Soman as Raghavan, the prisoner in the jail
- Srividya as Subhadra, Sethu's mother
- Shanavas as Nasser, Sethu's friend
- Santhosh as Baby Thomas, Sethu's friend
- Kunchan as Shambu Prasad, Sethu's friend
- Sankaradi as Kutti Naanu, Soniya's father
- Adoor Bhasi as Kaimal, Kesava Kurup's clerk
- Mala Aravindan as Shivan Pillai, the peon at the college
- T. P. Madhavan as Girishan, police officer
- KPAC Lalitha as Gouri

== Soundtrack ==
The music was composed by Raveendran with lyrics by Poovachal Khader.

No.	Song	Singers	Lyrics	Length (m:ss)
1	"Kaamini Nee"	K. J. Yesudas, Mrs. Ramola	Poovachal Khader	
2	"Orikkal Oridathu"	K. J. Yesudas	Poovachal Khader	
3	"Oru Swapnahamsam"	K. J. Yesudas, Vani Jairam	Poovachal Khader	
