= Rohini (actress) =

Indian actress, screenwriter, lyricist

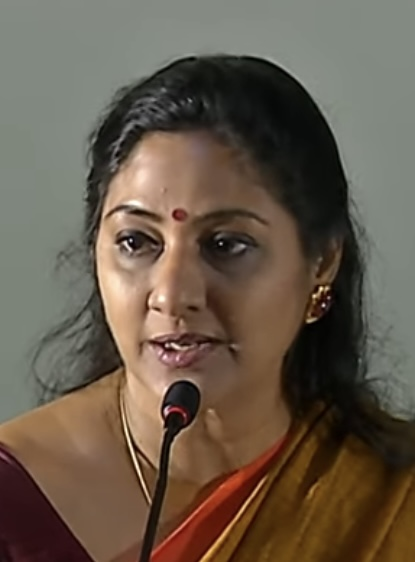
- Rohini in 2019
- Born: Rohini Molleti; Anakapalle, Andhra Pradesh, India
- Occupations: Actress; screenwriter; lyricist; dubbing artist
- Years active: 1974‍–‍present
- Spouse: Raghuvaran (m. 1996; div. 2004)
- Children: 1

Rohini Molleti, known professionally as Rohini, is an Indian actress, screenwriter, dubbing artist, and lyricist. She has mainly acted in Malayalam, Tamil and Telugu films along with few Kannada films. Having started her acting career at five, she has about 130 films to her credit. She received National Film Award – Special Mention and Andhra Pradesh state Nandi Special Jury Award for Best Performance as Rangi in the 1995 film Stri.

== Early life ==
A native of Anakapalli in Andhra Pradesh, Rohini spent all her childhood in Chennai, Tamil Nadu. Her father, Appa Rao Naidu, was a panchayat officer and her mother, Radha, was a housewife. Her father always wanted to become an actor, though he could not be an actor owing to various reasons; he encouraged Rohini to become an actress.

== Personal life ==
Her brother Balaji is also an actor. Rohini married actor Raghuvaran in 1996 but divorced in 2004. They have one son, Rishi.

== Career ==
She started her career in 1974 as a child actress. She was first seen as a wide-eyed five-year old in Yasodha Krishna (1975), a Telugu film. She is also a dubbing artist in the Telugu and Tamil film industries. She has voiced six characters in five of Mani Ratnam's films.

She has dubbed for actresses like Girija Shettar (Geethanjali), Amala (Siva), Manisha Koirala (Bombay and Indian) Aishwarya Rai (Iruvar and Raavanan), as well as Jyothika (Perazhagan and Vettaiyaadu Vilaiyaadu). She wrote lyrics for the Tamil film Pachaikili Muthucharam (2007), before ending another hiatus by writing all songs in the album, Maalai Pozhudhin Mayakathilaey (2012).

She writes episodes for Tamil TV serials. She started writing scripts for TV series way back in 1996, and has adapted the Sahithya Academy Award winning novel Verukku Neer for a tele film in 2005. She hosted the live TV talk show Kelvigal Aayiram for Vijay TV, which she said "dealt with issues close to my heart". She moderated the Tamil programme Azhagiya Tamizh Magal on Kalaignar TV and has worked as the anchor of Raj TV's show, Rohini's Box Office in which she reviewed the latest releases.

Being an activist for AIDS awareness, Rohini has also directed short films for M.G.R. Medical University and Tamil Nadu Aids Control Society. In 2008, Rohini had directed a 50-minute documentary Silent Hues about film industry's Child actress, she being one herself. In 2012, she has directed a feature film titled Appavin Meesai which is yet to be released.

== Awards ==
- 1995 – National Film Award – Special Mention – Stri
- 1995 – Nandi Award for Special Jury Best Performance – Stri
- 2017 – Vanitha Film Awards – Best Supporting Actress (Guppy, Action Hero Biju)
- 2017 – CPC Awards for Best Supporting Actress (Guppy, Action Hero Biju)

== Filmography ==
Rohini has mainly acted in Malayalam, Telugu, and Tamil films along with a few Kannada films. Having started her acting career at five, she has about 130 South Indian films to her credit.

Key
†	Denotes films that have not yet been released

=== As actress ===
List of Rohini film acting credits
Year	Title	Role	Language	Other notes
1974	Harathi		Telugu	Child actress
1974	Aadambaralu Anubandalu		Telugu	Child actress
1974	Intinti Katha		Telugu	Child actress
1975	Yashoda Krishna	Krishna	Telugu	Child actress
1975	Amma Naana		Telugu	Child actress
1975	Bhagasthulu		Telugu	Child actress
1975	Anna Thammulla Anubandam		Telugu	Child actress
1975	Balipeetam		Telugu	Child actress
1975	Raktha Sambandalu		Telugu	Child actress
1975	Samsaram		Telugu	Child actress
1975	Challani Thalli		Telugu	Child actress
1975	Bharathi		Telugu	Child actress
1976	Bhakta Kannappa		Telugu	Child actress
1976	Mayor Meenakshi		Telugu	Child actress
1976	Secretary		Telugu	Child actress
1976	Mahakavi Kshetrayya	Lord Krishna	Telugu	Child actress
1976	Raja	Ramu	Telugu	Child actress
1977	Adavi Ramudu	Gowri	Telugu	Child actress
1977	Moratodu		Telugu	Child actress
1977	Khaidhi Kalidasu		Telugu	Child actress
1977	Oke Raktham		Telugu	Child actress
1977	Kalpana		Telugu	Child actress
1977	Ee Tharam Manishi		Telugu	Child actress
1977	Jeevana Theeralu		Telugu	Child actress
1977	Chiranjeevi Rambabu	Rambabu	Telugu	Child actress
1978	Nayudu Bava		Telugu	Child actress
1978	Thalle Challani Dhaivam		Telugu	Child actress
1978	Chilipi Krishnudu		Telugu	Child actress
1979	Cheyyethi Jai Kottu	Balayya	Telugu	Child actress
1979	Maavari Manchitanam		Telugu	Child actress
1979	Laxmi Pooja		Telugu	Child actress
1979	Shri Vinayaka Vijayamu		Telugu	Child actress
1980	Talli Deevena	Raji	Telugu	Child actress
1981	Nyayam Kavali	Saroja	Telugu	Child actress
1981	Illalu	Singer in bus	Telugu	Child actress
1981	Tyagayya	Seethamma	Telugu	Child actress
1981	Pedala Brathukulu	Kalyani	Telugu	Child actress
1981	Sumai	Rohini	Tamil	
1982	Madhura Swapnam	Seethalu	Telugu	
1982	Subbarao Ki Kopam Vachhindi	–	Telugu	
1982	Bhakta Dhruva Markandeya	Turuchi	Telugu	
1982	Naa Desam	Sudha	Telugu	
1982	Illali Korikalu	Rajini	Telugu	
1982	Nalugu Stambalata	Gayatri	Telugu	
1982	Kakka	Devi	Malayalam	
1982	Dheera	Rani	Malayalam	
1982	Parvaiyin Marupakkam	Viswanathan's daughter	Tamil	
1982	Kalavari Samsaram	Sudha	Telugu	
1982	Anantha Ragalu	Seetha	Telugu	
1983	Ilamai Kaalangal	Meera	Tamil	
1983	Thandikkappatta Nyayangal	Lakshmi	Tamil	
1983	Valartha Kada	Annam	Tamil	
1983	Maga Maharaju	Raju's sister	Telugu	
1983	Nava Mohini	Radha	Telugu	
1983	Rugma	Prayaga	Malayalam	
1983	Ee Yugam		Malayalam	
1983	Kuyiline Thedi	Meenu	Malayalam	
1983	Aa Rathri	Radha	Malayalam	
1984	Thirakil Alpa Samayam	Amina	Malayalam	
1984	Piriyilla Naam	Sridevi	Malayalam	
1984	Parannu Parannu Parannu	Mini / Jessy / Sreekutty	Malayalam	
1984	Radhayude Kamukan	Radha	Malayalam	
1984	Shabadham	Radha	Malayalam	
1984	Ivide Thudangunnu	Sheela	Malayalam	
1984	Sandarbham	Shari	Malayalam	
1984	Ariyatha Veethikal	Sheela	Malayalam	
1984	Oru Painkilikatha	Vilasini	Malayalam	
1984	Devanthakudu	Lalitha	Telugu	
1984	Thirittu Rajakkal	–	Tamil	
1984	Aduthaduthu		Malayalam	
1984	Theere Pratheekshikkathe	Indu	Malayalam	
1984	Oru Kochu Swapnam	–	Malayalam	
1984	Arante Mulla Kochu Mulla	Rohini	Malayalam	
1984	Ponmaalai Pozhudhu		Tamil	
1985	Adhyayam Onnu Muthal	Rema	Malayalam	
1985	Anni	Radha	Tamil	
1985	Oru Kudakeezil	Sridevi	Malayalam	
1985	Akalathe Ambili	Ashwathy	Malayalam	
1985	Ozhivukaalam	Chinnu	Malayalam	
1985	Nerariyum Nerathu	Rathi	Malayalam	
1985	Gaayathridevi Ente Amma	Priya	Malayalam	
1985	Orikkal Oridathu	Soniya	Malayalam	
1985	Ee Thanalil Ithiri Neram	Leena	Malayalam	
1985	Ivide Ee Theerathu	Sreedevi	Malayalam	
1985	Aarodum Parayaruthu	Girija	Malayalam	
1985	Manakkale Thatha	Minikutty	Malayalam	
1985	Katha Ithuvare	Kala	Malayalam	
1985	Oru Sandesam Koodi	Rema	Malayalam	
1985	Mounanombaram	Lekha	Malayalam	
1985	Ee Lokam Ivide Kure Manushyar	Sheela	Malayalam	
1985	Ee Shabdam Innathe Shabdam	Pushpa	Malayalam	
1985	Onnaamprathi Olivil		Malayalam	
1985	Ormikkan Omanikkan		Malayalam	
1985	Jwalanam		Malayalam	
1986	Love Story	Shobha	Malayalam	
1986	Koodanayum Kattu	Liza	Malayalam	
1986	Njan Kathorthirikkum	Aasi	Malayalam	
1986	Abhayam Thedi	Vasanthi	Malayalam	
1986	Rareeram	Chitra	Malayalam	
1986	Prathyekam Sradhikkukka		Malayalam	
1986	Adiverukal	Annakutty	Malayalam	
1986	Ponnum Kudathinum Pottu	Rani	Malayalam	
1986	Karyam Kananayoru Kallachiri		Malayalam	
1986	Thaaiku Oru Thaalaattu	Chellam	Tamil	
1987	Vrutham	Thresia	Malayalam	
1987	Yaagagni	Latha	Malayalam	
1987	Onnaam Maanam Poomaanam	Rajasree	Malayalam	
1987	Theekkattu	Mercy	Malayalam	
1987	Vamban	Viji	Malayalam	
1987	P.C. 369	Sudha	Malayalam	
1987	Manja Manthrangal	Gladia	Malayalam	
1987	January Oru Orma	Maina	Malayalam	
1987	Achuvettante Veedu	Aswathy Nair	Malayalam	
1987	Itha Samayamayi	Alice	Malayalam	
1987	Kanan Kothichu		Malayalam	
1987	Chamundeshwari Pooja Mahime	Kumari Malathi	Kannada	
1987	Attagaru Zindabad	Meenakshi	Telugu	
1988	Raktha Samharam		Telugu	
1988	Maharajasri Mayagadu	Sudha	Telugu	
1988	Jadi Ketha Moodi	Gayathri	Tamil	
1988	Dhwani	Sunitha	Malayalam	
1988	Anuragi	Julie	Malayalam	
1988	Onninu Purake Mattonnu	Sudha	Malayalam	
1988	Sankhanaadam	Thulasi	Malayalam	
1988	Dhinarathrangal	Ponni	Malayalam	
1988	Paadhamudra	Ashwathy	Malayalam	
1988	1921	Lakshmi	Malayalam	
1989	Kali Kaaryamayi-Crime Branch	Sunitha	Malayalam	
1989	Agnipravesham		Malayalam	
1989	Varnatheru	Urmila	Malayalam	
1989	Mizhiyorangalil		Malayalam	
1989	Dhruva Nakshatram	Saroja	Telugu	
1989	Bhale Dampathulu	Susheela	Telugu	
1989	Naa Mogudu Naake Sontham	Swathi	Telugu	
1989	Dharmam Vellum	Geetha	Tamil	
1990	Midhya		Malayalam	
1990	Jawani Zindabad	Rama	Hindi	
1990	Meri Lalkaar		Hindi	
1990	Silambu	Rasathi	Tamil	
1990	Pudhu Varisu	Nithya	Tamil	
1990	Manasukketha Maapillai		Tamil	
1991	Pavunnu Pavunuthan	Pavunnu	Tamil	
1991	Thanthu Vitten Ennai	Surya	Tamil	
1991	Jagadeka Veera	Padmini	Kannada	
1991	Ezhunnallathu		Malayalam	
1992	Rendu Pondatti Kaavalkaaran	Rukmini	Tamil	
1992	Senbaga Thottam	Manga	Tamil	
1992	Abhirami	Vasanthi	Tamil	
1992	Natchathira Nayagan	Radha	Tamil	
1993	Samaagamam	Elsamma	Malayalam	
1993	Marupadiyum	Kavitha	Tamil	
1993	Pudhu Piravi		Tamil	
1993	Aparna		Malayalam	
1993	Pettredutha Pillai	Vaidehi	Tamil	
1993	Nallathe Nadakkum	Jaya	Tamil	
1993	Bandhukkal Sathrukkal	Sheela	Malayalam	
1994	Magalir Mattum	Papamma	Tamil	
1994	Thamarai	Poogodai	Tamil	
1994	Puthran	Lisa	Malayalam	
1994	CID Unnikrishnan B.A., B.Ed.	Arundathi Nair/ Revathy Nair	Malayalam	
1995	Sundarimaare Sookshikkukka	Nimmi	Malayalam	
1995	Aasai	Ganga	Tamil	
1995	Stri	Rangi	Telugu	National Film Award – Special Mention
1995	Thondan	Subha	Tamil	
1995	Thotta Chinungi	Amlu	Tamil	
1995	Ilavarasi	Lakshmi	Tamil	
1996	Veettukulle Thiruvizha	Gayathri	Tamil	
2004	Virumaandi	Angela Kaathamuthu	Tamil	
2004	Kadhale Engal Desiya Geetham		Tamil	
2005	Ayya	Maadasami's Wife	Tamil	
2005	Vairavan	–	Tamil	
2006	Kaivantha Kalai	Stage host	Tamil	
2006	Ilakkanam	Susi	Tamil	
2007	Naalaiya Pozhuthum Unnodu	Nagai	Tamil	
2007	Thaamirabharani	Pechchikani	Tamil	
2007	Onbadhu Roobai Nottu	Kameela	Tamil	
2007	Rock n' Roll	Nirmala	Malayalam	
2008	Thalappavu	Karthyayani	Malayalam	
2009	Vaamanan	Rohini	Tamil	
2009	Yavarum Nalam; 13B: Fear Has a New Address	TV Reporter	Tamil; Hindi	
2009	2 Harihar Nagar	Sulochana	Malayalam	
2010	In Ghost House Inn	Sulochana	Malayalam	
2010	Pen Singam	Surya's mother	Tamil	
2010	Moscowin Kavery	Dance Teacher	Tamil	
2010	Nandalala	Mentally ill woman	Tamil	
2011	Ala Modalaindi	Revathi	Telugu	
2011	Payyans	Padma	Malayalam	
2011	City of God	Lakshmi	Malayalam	
2011	Sankarankovil	Padma Muthuvelu	Tamil	
2011	Innanu Aa Kalyanam	Lillykutty	Malayalam	
2012	Second Show	Devaki	Malayalam	
2012	Shiva Manasulo Shruti	Shiva's mother	Telugu	
2012	Ishq	Jaya	Telugu	
2012	3	Janani's mother	Tamil	
2012	Diamond Necklace	Dr. Savithri	Malayalam	
2012	18 Vayasu	Dr. Suchithra	Tamil	
2012	Kozhi Koovuthu	Valliammai	Tamil	
2013	Thirumathi Thamizh	Thamizhselvan's mother	Tamil	
2013	Black Butterfly	Benny's mother	Malayalam	
2013	Jagadguru Adi Shankara	Sankara's mother	Telugu	
2013	Anthaka Mundu Aa Tarvatha	Sujatha	Telugu	
2013	Thanga Meenkal	Parvathi	Tamil	
2014	Ninnindale	Pramila's Aunty	Kannada	
2014	Kotha Janta	Sirish's Mother	Telugu	
2014	Venmegam	Jyothi	Tamil	
2014	Oka Laila Kosam	Nandana's mother	Telugu	
2014	Chinnadana Nee Kosam	Nandhini's mother	Telugu	
2014	Ormayundo Ee Mukham	Vasundhara Devi	Malayalam	
2015	Sir C. P.	Kochu Mary	Malayalam	
2015	Baahubali: The Beginning	Sanga	Telugu/Tamil	
2015	Sher	Gautam's mother	Telugu	
2015	Columbus	Ashwin's mother	Telugu	
2016	Nenu Sailaja	Sailaja's mother	Telugu	
2016	Action Hero Biju	Bhavathi	Malayalam	
2016	Uyire Uyire	Wedding aunty	Tamil	
2016	Jeniffer Karuppaiya	Jennifer	Tamil	
2016	Gentleman	Gautham's mother	Telugu	
2016	Guppy	Guppy's mother	Malayalam	
2016	54321	Teacher	Tamil	
2016	Balle Vellaiyathevaa	Sakthi's mother	Tamil	
2016	Achamindri	Tamizh Selvi	Tamil	
2017	Sathya	Doctor	Malayalam	
2017	Baahubali 2: The Conclusion	Shivudu's mother (Sanga)	Telugu	Partially reshot in Tamil
2017	Role Models	Shreya's mother	Malayalam	
2017	Velaikkaran	Ponni	Tamil	
2017	Juliet Lover of Idiot	Vara's mother	Telugu	
2017	Okka Kshanam	Jeeva's mother	Telugu	
2018	Awe!	Radha's mother	Telugu	
2018	Rangasthalam	Chitti Babu's mother	Telugu	
2018	Abhiyum Anuvum	Meena	Tamil	
2018	Goli Soda 2	Inbavalli's mother	Tamil	
2018	Lover	Charita's mother	Telugu	
2018	Chi La Sow	Latha	Telugu	
2018	Traffic Ramasamy	Rukku	Tamil	
2018	Kadal Kuthiraigal	Refugee	Tamil	
2019	Ottam	Sara	Malayalam	
2019	Neerthirai	Banu	Tamil	
2019	Jiivi	Lakshmi	Tamil	
2019	Manmadhudu 2	Janani	Telugu	
2019	Magamuni	Deivanai	Tamil	
2019	Sye Raa Narasimha Reddy	Padmamma	Telugu	
2019	Bigil	Anitha's mother	Tamil	
2019	Thipparaa Meesam	Lalita	Telugu	
2019	Market Raja MBBS	Latha	Tamil	
2019	Iddari Lokam Okate	Varsha's mother	Telugu	
2020	Ala Vaikunthapurramuloo	Lakshmi	Telugu	
2020	Johaar		Telugu	
2020	V	Sreelata	Telugu	
2021	Rang De	Sailaja	Telugu	
2021	Nootokka Jillala Andagaadu	GSN's mother	Telugu	
2021	Tuck Jagadish	Kumari	Telugu	
2021	Navarasa	Vaalambal	Tamil	
2021	Yennanga Sir Unga Sattam	Badhrakali	Tamil	
2021	Rocky	Malli	Tamil	
2021	Varudu Kaavalenu	Aakash's mother	Telugu	
2022	Freedom Fight	Dhanalakshmi	Malayalam	Segment : "Old Age Home"
2022	Mike	Antony's mother	Malayalam	
2022	Ante Sundaraniki	Sundar's mother	Telugu	
2022	Atithi Devo Bhava	Abhi's mother	Telugu	
2022	10th Class Diaries		Telugu	
2022	Jiivi 2	Lakshmi	Tamil	
2022	Sita Ramam	Reporter Vijayalakshmi	Telugu	
2022	Meet Cute	Padma	Telugu	
2022	Witness	Indrani	Tamil	
2023	Sridevi Shoban Babu	Kamala	Telugu	
2023	Writer Padmabhushan	Saraswati	Telugu	
2023	Das Ka Dhamki	Sanjay's mother	Telugu	
2023	Beginning	Balu's mother	Tamil	
2023	Kolaambi	Sundarambal	Malayalam	
2023	Thandatti	Thangaponnu	Tamil	
2023	Valatty	Sumathi	Malayalam	
2023	Bro	Mark's mother	Telugu	
2023	Kushi	Zoya	Telugu	
2023	Otta	Umabba	Malayalam	
2023	Thaal	Vishwa's mother	Malayalam	
2023	Extra Ordinary Man	Usha	Telugu	
2023	Jorugaa Husharugaa	Santhosh's mother	Telugu	
2024	Dear	Lakshmi	Tamil	
2024	Ajayante Randam Moshanam	Sarojam	Malayalam	
2024	Mathu Vadalara 2	Deepa	Telugu	
2024	Vettaiyan	DSP Nazeema	Tamil	
2024	Laggam	Suguna	Telugu	
2025	Kaadhal Enbadhu Podhu Udamai	Lakshmi	Tamil	
2025	Aghathiyaa	Anjalai	Tamil	
2025	Court	Seetarathnam	Telugu	
2025	Akkada Ammayi Ikkada Abbayi	Krishna’s mother	Telugu	
2025	Kingdom	Suri’s mother	Telugu	
2025	Dude	Parvathy	Tamil	
2025	Telusu Kada	Raaga’s mother	Telugu	
2025	The Girlfriend	Vikram's mother	Telugu	

Key
†	Denotes films that have not yet been released

=== As lyricist ===
- 2007 – Pachaikili Muthucharam (Unakkul Naane) (Song composed by Harris Jayaraj)
- 2009 – Villu (Jalsa)
- 2010 – Mundhinam Paartheney (Maya, Kanavena)
- 2012 – Maalai Pozhudhin Mayakathilaey (All Songs)
- 2013 – 11th Chennai International Film Festival Anthem (Song composed by Prakash Nikki)
- 2020 – Galatta Kalyanam (Murali Mogha – Tamil Dubbed Version of "Tere Rang" from Atrangi Re) (Song composed by A. R. Rahman)
- 2023 – En Viruppam (Music Video) (Music by Sindhuri Vishal)

=== As director ===
- 1995 – Chinna Chinna Aasai – Ganga (Sun TV)
- 2008 – Silent Hues (documentary film)

=== As dialogue writer ===
- 2013 – Welcome Obama

=== As dubbing artist ===
List of Rohini film credits as dubbing artist
Year	Film	Actress	Language	Other notes
1989	Geethanjali	Girija Shettar	Telugu	Also for the Tamil version Idhayathai Thirudathe
1989	Shiva	Amala	Telugu	Also for the Tamil version Udhayam
1990	Anjali	Revathi	Telugu	Dubbed version
1990	Neti Siddhartha	Ayesha Jhulka	Telugu	
1990	Nari Nari Naduma Murari	Nirosha	Telugu	
1990	Prema Yuddham	Amala	Telugu	
1990	Aggiramudu	Amala	Telugu	
1991	Chembaruthi	Roja	Tamil	
1991	Shanti Kranti	Juhi Chawla	Telugu	
1991	Rowdy Alludu	Shobana	Telugu	
1992	April 1 Vidudala	Shobana	Telugu	
1992	Prema Sikharam	Mamta Kulkarni	Telugu	
1992	Unnai Vaazhthi Paadugiren	Mohini	Tamil	
1992	Meera	Aishwarya	Tamil	
1992	Ashokan (Tamil Dubbed version)	Madhoo	Tamil	
1992	Antham	Urmila Matondkar	Telugu	
1993	Gentleman	Madhoo	Tamil	
1994	Aavesham	Madhoo	Telugu	
1994	Vietnam Colony	Vineetha	Tamil	
1994	May Madham	Sonali Kulkarni	Tamil	
1995	Bombay	Manisha Koirala	Tamil	
1995	Asuran	Roja	Tamil	
1995	Villadhi Villain	Nagma	Tamil	
1995	Veluchami	Shruti	Tamil	
1995	Lingababu Love Story	Rajashree	Telugu	
1995	Chinna Vathiyar	Ranjitha	Tamil	
1995	Mr. Madras	Vineetha	Tamil	
1995	Kuruthipunal	Gowthami	Tamil	
1995	Sogasu Chuda Taramaa?	Indraja	Telugu	
1996	Kalloori Vaasal	Pooja Bhatt	Tamil	
1996	Sengottai	Rambha	Tamil	
1996	Kadhal Kottai	Heera Rajagopal	Tamil	
1996	Krishna	Heera Rajagopal	Tamil	
1996	Mr. Romeo	Shilpa Shetty	Tamil	
1996	Kaalapani	Tabu	Tamil; Telugu	Dubbed versions
1996	Tamizh Selvan	Roja	Tamil	
1996	Indian	Manisha Koirala	Tamil; Telugu	Dubbed Telugu version
1997	Devathai	Keerthi Reddy	Tamil	
1997	Iruvar	Aishwarya Rai	Tamil; Telugu	Dubbed Telugu version
1997	Vaazhga Jananayagam	Pragathi	Tamil	
1999	Ooty	Roja	Tamil	
2004	Aayutha Ezhuthu	Meera Jasmine	Telugu	Dubbed Telugu version
2004	Arjun	Keerthi Reddy	Telugu	
2004	Perazhagan	Jyothika (for the character of Shenbagam)	Tamil; Telugu	Dubbed Telugu version
2006	Vettaiyaadu Vilaiyaadu	Jyothika	Tamil	
2007	Pachaikili Muthucharam	Andrea Jeremiah	Tamil	
2007	Guru	Aishwarya Rai	Tamil	Dubbed Tamil version
2008	Sandai	Nadhiya	Tamil	
2008	Kanchivaram	Shriya Reddy	Tamil	
2009	Pattalam	Nadhiya	Tamil	
2010	Raavanan	Aishwarya Rai	Tamil	
2011	Mappillai	Manisha Koirala	Tamil	
2019	The Lion King	Alfre Woodard	Tamil	For the character Sarabi
2021	99 Songs	Manisha Koirala	Tamil; Telugu	Dubbed versions
2022	Virata Parvam	Nandita Das	Telugu; Tamil	Dubbed Tamil version
2023	Sweet Kaaram Coffee	Padmavati Rao	Tamil	Amazon Prime Video Web Series
2024	Heeramandi	Manisha Koirala	Tamil; Telugu	Netflix TV series; dubbed versions

=== As playback singer ===
- 1995 – Chinna Vathiyar – Kanmaniye Kanmaniye (along with S. P. Balasubrahmanyam)

=== Television ===
Tamil

- Chinna Chinna Aasai – Ganga (Sun TV (India) ) acted and directed
- Kelvigal Aayiram (Vijay TV) as Host
- Azhagiya Tamizh Magal (Kalaignar TV) as Moderator
- Rohini's Box Office (Raj TV) as Host
- Kelvigal Neram (Vendhar TV) as Host
- Geethanjali – Telefilm (Doordarshan) as Writer
- Engae Aval- Actress

Malayalam

- Nerukku Neer – Telefilm (Doordarshan) Screenplay and lyrics
- Kadha Ithu Vare (Mazhavil Manorama) as Host
- Ugram Ujjwalam Season 2 Grand Finale (Mazhavil Manorama) as Judge
- Comedy Stars season 2 (Asianet) as Judge
- Red Carpet (Amrita TV) as Mentor
- Oru Chiri Iruchiri Bumper Chiri (Mazhavil Manorama) as Mentor/Judge
- Sudhamani Superaa (Zee Keralam) as Mahima

Telugu

- Addham (Aha)

=== Web series ===
Year	Series	Role	Language	Notes	Ref(s)
2023	Dhootha	Madhavi	Telugu		
