= Ee Thanalil Ithiri Nerum =

1985 Indian Malayalam language film

Ee Thanalil Ithiri Neram
- Directed by: P. G. Vishwambharan
- Screenplay by: John Paul
- Story by: Antony Eastman
- Produced by: Hameed; K. T. Kunjumon
- Starring: Mammootty; Rahman; Shobana; Thilakan; Adoor Bhasi
- Cinematography: Jayanan Vincent
- Edited by: G. Murali
- Music by: Shyam
- Production company: Rachana Pictures
- Distributed by: Rachana Pictures
- Release date: 25 January 1985
- Country: India
- Language: Malayalam

Ee Thanalil Ithiri Neram (transl. This much time in this flame) is a 1985 Indian Malayalam film, directed by P. G. Vishwambharan and produced by Hameed and K. T. Kunjumon. The film stars Mammootty, Rahman, Shobana, Thilakan and Adoor Bhasi. The film's musical score is by Shyam. Mohanlal's Balettan is loosely adapted from this film.

== Plot ==
Vijayan has been running his family business since his father died. He is often visited by a mysterious woman, Thulasi. Vijayan falls for his stenographer, Soudamini, and marries her. A few years into the marriage, Thulasi's visits create problems in the marital relationship.

== Cast ==
- Mammootty as Vijayan
- Shobana as Soudamini
- Rahman as Ravi
- Rohini as Leena Menon
- Innocent as Pilla
- Nedumudi Venu as Adv.Menon
- Kaviyoor Ponnamma as Savithri
- Sumithra as Soudamini's elder sister
- Thilakan as Madhavan Master, Soudamini's father
- Adoor Bhasi as Vijayan's uncle
- Venu Nagavalli as Doctor
- Baby Chaithanya as Vijayan's daughter

== Synopsis ==
The story revolves around the life of Vijayan (Mammotty). His otherwise normal life is interrupted with the presence of a mysterious person named Thulsi. The repeated arrival of Thulsi causes tension in his family life.

== Soundtrack ==
All lyrics are written by Poovachal Khader; all music is composed by Shyam.

Track listing
No.	Title	Artist(s)	Length
1.	"Aa Ramya Sreerangame"	S. Janaki
2.	"D.I.S.C.O." (Swarnathaamara Kiliye)	K. J. Yesudas, K. S. Chithra
3.	"Maanam Mannil"	K. J. Yesudas, S. Janaki
4.	"Mummy Mummy"	S. Janaki
5.	"Poovaninju Maanasam"	K. J. Yesudas, S. Janaki
