= Gaayathridevi Ente Amma =

- Promotional poster designed by P. N. Menon
- Directed by: Sathyan Anthikkad
- Written by: Venu Nagavally
- Produced by: Prathap.S.Pavamani; Leela Raghunath for Sachithra Movies
- Starring: Rahman; Bharath Gopi; M. G. Soman; Seema
- Cinematography: Jayanan Vincent
- Edited by: G Venkittaraman
- Music by: Shyam
- Release date: 1 November 1985
- Country: India
- Language: Malayalam

Gaayathridevi Ente Amma is a 1985 Indian Malayalam-language film directed by Sathyan Anthikkad and produced by Prathap S. Pavamani and Leela Raghunath for Sachithra Movies starring Rahman and Seema, supported by Bharath Gopi, M. G. Soman, Rohini, Ashokan and Sukumari playing other important roles.

== Cast ==
- Rahman as Appu
- Seema as Gayathri Devi
- Bharath Gopi as Mahadevan Thampi
- M. G. Soman as Mr. Menon
- Rohini as Priya
- Sankaradi as Nambiar
- Jagathy Sreekumar as Ousepp
- Sukumari as Appu's Friend's Mother
- Adoor Bhavani as Naniyamma
- Shubha as Saudamini
- Master Biju as Master Vensley
- Ashokan as Thomachan
- Bahadoor as Raman Nair
- T. P. Madhavan as George
- Thodupuzha Vasanthi as Ladies Hostel Warden

== Soundtrack ==
| No. | Song | Singers | Lyrics | Length (m:ss) |
|---|---|---|---|---|
| 1 | "Kunjilam Chundil" | P Susheela | Sathyan Anthikkad | |
