= Ee Lokam Evide Kure Manushyar =

- Promotional Poster
- Directed by: P. G. Vishwambharan
- Written by: Antony Eastman; John Paul (dialogues)
- Screenplay by: John Paul
- Produced by: Sajan
- Starring: Mammootty; Jayabharathi; Innocent; Thilakan
- Cinematography: Ramachandra Babu
- Edited by: V. P. Krishnan
- Music by: Shyam
- Production company: Saj Productions
- Distributed by: Saj Productions
- Release date: 25 September 1985
- Country: India
- Language: Malayalam

Ee Lokam Evide Kure Manushyar is a 1985 Indian Malayalam-language film, directed by P. G. Vishwambharan and produced by Sajan. The film stars Mammooty, Rahman, Nedumudi Venu, Jayabharathi, Innocent and Thilakan in important roles. The film has musical score by Shyam.

The film has Bollywood actor Amjad Khan in a pivotal role.

== Cast ==
- Mammootty as Ummer
- Kajal Kiran as Jameela
- Amjad Khan as Abbas
- Rahman as Balu
- T. G. Ravi as Keshavan / Keshu Muthalali
- Jayabharathi
- Innocent as Ouseppu
- Thilakan as Krishna Pillai
- Nedumudi Venu
- Rohini as Sheela
- Lalu Alex as SI Sreedharan
- Meena
- Paravoor Bharathan
- Philomina as Chantha Rosy
- Santhosh
- James as James

== Soundtrack ==
The music was composed by Shyam and the lyrics were written by P. Bhaskaran.

No.	Song	Singers	Lyrics	Length (m:ss)
1	"Kanavin Manimaaran"	Chorus, Cochin Ibrahim	P. Bhaskaran	
2	"Kannum Kannum"	Unni Menon, Chorus, Lathika	P. Bhaskaran	
3	"Sankalpam"	K. G. Markose	P. Bhaskaran	
4	"Thattimutti Kaithatti"	K. G. Markose, Lathika	P. Bhaskaran	
