= Kandu Kandarinju =

- Poster designed by Gayathri Ashokan
- Directed by: Sajan
- Written by: Prabhakaran Puthur; S. N. Swamy
- Produced by: Vijaya Movies
- Starring: Mammootty; Mohanlal; Nadia Moidu; Rahman; Menaka; Lalu Alex
- Cinematography: Anandakuttan
- Edited by: V. P. Krishnan
- Music by: Shyam
- Release date: 21 December 1985
- Country: India
- Language: Malayalam

Kandu Kandarinju is a 1985 Indian Malayalam-language film starring Mammootty, Mohanlal, Nadhiya, Rahman, Menaka, Lalu Alex. The film is directed by Sajan.

== Plot ==
Sreedharan is struggling after the death of his father. He has an unmarried sister, Ammini, who was pregnant with her boyfriend's child six years ago. His younger brother Kunjunni is in college but gets bullied by his classmates. He gets help from the girl Aswathy to fight against them. Meanwhile, Ammini is visited by her lover, Krishnanunny, who is suspected of having murdered Sreedharan's father, but there is no direct evidence. There, Krishnanunny sees his own young son. Sreedharan initially resents Krishnanunny due to the murder allegations but later realizes the latter's innocence and feels sorry.

Aswathy is forced to marry her brother's friend who killed Kunjunni's father. Sreedharan's girlfriend was nearly raped by Grasscourt Kumar, but she was saved by Krishnanunny. Sreedharan's mother, Janaki, finally admits to him that it was someone else, that Kumar's friend had killed his father, and not Krishnanunny, who was there for Ammini and their young son. Turns out Krishnanunny took the fall for Janaki as she accidentally hit Sreedharan's father while aiming for Kumar's friend which killed the father by accident. Sreedharan realizes that Krishnanunny is a good guy and feels sorry. Suddenly, Sreedharan's girlfriend runs to him for help as she was escaping her brother who is Kumar's friend and Kumar. Then a gang of goons arrive and a fight occurs with Sreedharan, Krishnanunni and Kunjunni fighting the gang. Sreedharan's girlfriend's brother who is Kumar friend tries to forcefully take her away but Janaki and Ammini hit him on the head with a stick who dies as a result. Janaki also dies from being pushed to the ground earlier leaving Sreedharan, Krishnanunny, Kunjuni and Ammini devastated.

== Cast ==
- Mammootty as Sreedharan
- Mohanlal as Krishnanunny
- Rahman as Kunjunni
- Nadia Moidu as Aswathy
- Menaka as Ammini
- Lalu Alex as Grasscourt Kumar
- Jalaja as Padmam
- Sivaji as Sivan Pillai
- Sukumari as Janaki
- Mala Aravindan as Kittan
- Master Prasobh as Kuttan
- Adoor Bhavani as Chellamma
- Prathapachandran as Balakrishnan, Sreedharan's father
- Oduvil Unnikrishnan as Bhairavan, Boys hostel warden
- Thodupuzha Vasanthi as Girls hostel warden
- Tony as college student
- Santhosh as Sajan, a college student
- Kothuku Nanappan as College professor

== Soundtrack ==
The music was composed by Shyam and the lyrics were written by Chunakkara Ramankutty and Kala Adoor.

No.	Song	Singers	Lyrics	Length (m:ss)
1	"Neeyarinjo Mele Manathu"	Mohanlal, Mala Aravindan	Chunakkara Ramankutty	
2	"Thaazhampookkal Thedum"	Unni Menon	Chunakkara Ramankutty	
3	"Thennalaadum"	K. S. Chithra	Kala Adoor	
4	"Thennalaadum Poomarathin"	Unni Menon	Kala Adoor	
