= Angadikkappurathu =

1985 film

- Poster
- Directed by: I. V. Sasi
- Written by: T. Damodaran
- Screenplay by: T. Damodaran
- Produced by: Rosamma George
- Starring: Mammootty; Mohanlal; Rahman; Kaviyoor Ponnamma; Adoor Bhasi
- Cinematography: N. A. Thara
- Edited by: K. Narayanan
- Music by: Shyam
- Production company: JMJ Arts
- Distributed by: JMJ Arts
- Release date: 5 July 1985
- Country: India
- Language: Malayalam

Angadikkappurathu is a 1985 Indian Malayalam film, directed by I. V. Sasi and produced by Rosamma George. The film stars Mammootty, Mohanlal, Kaviyoor Ponnamma and Adoor Bhasi in the lead roles. The film has musical score by Shyam.

== Cast ==
- Mohanlal as Babu
- Mammootty as Jose
- Rahman as Charley
- Mahalakshmi (Kannada actress) as Neena
- Swapna as Shirley Fernadez
- Kaviyoor Ponnamma as Rosi
- Adoor Bhasi as Lazar
- T. G. Ravi as Alex
- Thiruthiyadu Vilasini
- Thodupuzha Vasanthy as Beevi
- Sabitha Anand as Sainaba
- Achankunju as Saithakka
- Manavalan Joseph as Fernandez
- Krishna Kurup as Mooppan
- Balan K. Nair as Khan Sayib
- Vincent as Police Inspector
- Thrissur Elsy as Jose's mother
- Roshni as Rosal
- Nellikkode Bhaskaran as Nambiar
- Kuthiravattom Pappu as Pappu
- Santhosh as Raghu
- K. P. Ummer as Dasappan
- Lissy as Rathi
- Maniyanpilla Raju as Vasu
- Kundara Johnny as Anthony Varghese
- Y. Vijaya as Rajamma
- Beena Sabu as Kalyani
- P. K. Radhadevi as Mary
- Kozhikode Sharada as Khadeejathatha

== Soundtrack ==
The music was composed by Shyam and the lyrics were written by Bichu Thirumala.

No.	Song	Singers	Lyrics	Length (m:ss)
1	"Azhakinoraaraadhana"	Krishnachandran	Bichu Thirumala	
2	"Mailaanchichodikalil"	K. J. Yesudas, K. S. Chithra	Bichu Thirumala	
3	"Pokaathe Pokaathe"	Bichu Thirumala, P. Jayachandran, Krishnachandran	Bichu Thirumala	
4	"Thooventhooval"	K. S. Chithra, Unni Menon	Bichu Thirumala	
