= Njan Kathorthirikkum =

- Directed by: Rasheed Karapuzha
- Written by: Azeez V. A. A. Mosses (dialogues)
- Screenplay by: Mosses
- Starring: Rohini; Kundara Johnny; Nellikode Bhaskaran; Sabitha Anand
- Cinematography: C. E. Babu
- Edited by: K. Narayanan
- Music by: Shyam
- Production companies: Victory & Victory
- Distributed by: Victory & Victory
- Release date: 7 October 1986
- Country: India
- Language: Malayalam

Njan Kathorthirikkum is a 1986 Indian Malayalam-language film, directed by Rasheed Karapuzha. The film stars Rohini, Kundara Johnny, Nellikode Bhaskaran and Sabitha Anand in the lead roles. The film has musical score by Shyam.

== Cast ==
- Rohini
- Kundara Johnny
- Nellikode Bhaskaran
- Sabitha Anand
- Seema
- Valsala Menon
- Vijayaraghavan

== Soundtrack ==
The music was composed by Shyam with lyrics by P. T. Abdurahiman.

No.	Song	Singers	Lyrics	Length (m:ss)
1	"Madhurikkum Then Kani"	K. J. Yesudas, K. S. Chithra	P. T. Abdurahiman	
2	"Madhurikkum Then Kani"	K. S. Chithra	P. T. Abdurahiman	
