= Poomukhappadiyil Ninneyum Kaathu =

- Promotional poster designed by RK
- Directed by: Bhadran
- Written by: Bhadran
- Produced by: Jose Thomas Padinjarekara; K. B. Peethambaran
- Starring: Mammootty; Rahman; Cecily; Srividya
- Edited by: M. S. Mani
- Music by: Ilaiyaraaja
- Production company: United Peoples
- Distributed by: United Peoples
- Release date: 9 May 1986
- Country: India
- Language: Malayalam

Poomukhapadiyil Ninneyum Kaathu is a 1986 Indian Malayalam-language film, directed by Bhadran, starring Mammootty, Cecily, Rahman, and Srividya. Mohanlal appeared in a guest appearance. The film tells the story of Sanjay (Rahman) and Cecily (Cecily). The film was remade in Tamil as Konjum Kili, with Raghuvaran and Srividya.

== Plot ==
Poomukhapadiyil Ninneyum Kaathu tells the story of troubled marital life, due to one partner's unnecessary doubt of another, causing mental agony to their children.

The movie highlights how unfounded jealousies can ripple through family relationships and affect the younger generation.

The story revolves around Dr. Isaac Peter (Mammootty), a respected physician, and his marriage to Clara (Sree Vidya), which is constantly strained by her persistent doubts about his fidelity.

The neighbouring family faces similar tensions with Vasu Pillai (Thilakan), a pharmacy owner, who harbours suspicions about his wife Ammukutty.

The children in both families struggle with the stress of constant conflict and feel unloved.

In this tense context, a romantic subplot unfolds between the families' children, Cecily (the Isaacs' daughter) and Sanjay (the Pillais' son), with the added barrier of the different faith backgrounds of the two families.

Pauly, Clara's younger brother, (Mohanlal), brings a mixture of comedic ineptitude and physical violence to the mix in his attacks on Sanjay to ostensibly protect Cecily. His presence highlights Clara's lack of self reflection and insight as she ignores Pauly's flirtatious behaviours with other women.

Clara burns Cecily's face with hot wax to repel Sanjay as she descends into her neurotic spiral, and Vasu reacts violently to Sanjay's questions about his love for his son and his wife.

The film ends with the suicides of the star crossed lovers, and the anguish of Clara and Isaac at the loss their daughter.

== Cast ==
- Rahman as Sanjay / Sanju
- Cecily as Cecily Issac
- Mammootty as Dr. Issac Peter
- Srividya as Clara Issac
- Thilakan as Vasu Pillai
- Sulakshana as Ammukutty
- Adoor Bhavani as Therutha Chettathy
- Kumbalangi Beena as Pennamma, Clara's Servant
- Mohanlal as Pauly (Guest appearance)

== Soundtrack ==
All lyrics are written by Bichu Thirumala; all music is composed by Ilaiyaraaja.

No.	Title	Artist(s)	Length
1.	"Konche Karayalle"	K. J. Yesudas, S. Janaki
2.	"Poonkaattinodum"	K. J. Yesudas, S. Janaki
3.	"Poonkaattinodum" (Bit)	K. J. Yesudas, S. Janaki
4.	"Poonkaattinodum" (Male Bit)	K. J. Yesudas
