= Upaharam (1985 film) =

- poster
- Directed by: Sajan
- Written by: Jimmy Luke; Kaloor Dennis (dialogues)
- Screenplay by: Kaloor Dennis
- Produced by: Shaji Joseph; Rajan Joseph
- Starring: Mammootty; Rahman (actor); Shobana; Srividya; Sukumari
- Cinematography: Anandakuttan
- Edited by: V. P. Krishnan
- Music by: Johnson
- Production company: Prakash Movietone
- Distributed by: Prakash Movietone
- Release date: 14 November 1985
- Country: India
- Language: Malayalam

Upaharam is a 1985 Indian Malayalam film, directed by Sajan and produced by Shaji Joseph and Rajan Joseph. The film stars Mammootty, Rahman (actor), Shobana, Srividya and Sukumari in the lead roles. The film has musical score by Johnson. This film was released on 12 November 1985 during Diwali.

== Cast ==
- Mammootty as Dr. Jeevan Thomas
- Rahman as Ajith
- Shobana as Maggi Fernadas
- Srividya as Sarojiniamma
- Sukumari
- Thilakan as Divakaran
- Jose Prakash as Fernandez
- Santhosh as Vinod
- Jalaja as Dr. Roopa
- Kunchan as Khadher
- Lalu Alex as Tony Cheiyan/ Achayan
- Mala Aravindan as Sunderashan
- Venu Puthalathu

== Soundtrack ==
The music was composed by Johnson and the lyrics were written by Shibu Chakravarthy.

| No. | Song | Singers | Lyrics | Length (m:ss) |
|---|---|---|---|---|
| 1 | "Aalolamaadunna" | K. S. Chithra | Shibu Chakravarthy | |
| 2 | "Ponmeghamo" | K. G. Markose | Shibu Chakravarthy | |
