= Aduthaduthu =

- Directed by: Sathyan Anthikkad
- Screenplay by: John Paul
- Story by: Revathi
- Starring: Rahman; Sukumari; Thilakan; KPAC Lalitha; Ahalya
- Cinematography: Anandakuttan
- Edited by: G. Venkittaraman
- Music by: Raveendran
- Production company: Revathi Productions
- Distributed by: Revathi Productions
- Release date: 23 November 1984
- Country: India
- Language: Malayalam

Aduthaduthu is a 1984 Indian Malayalam film, directed by Sathyan Anthikkad. The film stars Rahman, Sukumari, Thilakan, KPAC Lalitha and Ahalya in the lead roles. The film has musical score by Raveendran.

== Cast ==
- Rahman as Raju
- Mohanlal as Vishnu Mohan
- Sukumari as Gaurikutty
- Thilakan as Thankappan
- KPAC Lalitha as Kausalya
- Ahalya as Radha
- Karamana Janardanan Nair as Ayyappan
- Ashokan as Jeevan Philip
- Beena as Raman Kutty's wife
- Sankaradi as Adiyodi
- Bharath Gopi as Father Clement Kuriapalli
- Lissy as Rema S. Menon
- Bahadoor as Hajiyaar
- Kuthiravattam Pappu as Raman Kutty
- Mala Aravindan as Kariachan

== Soundtrack ==
The music was composed by Raveendran and the lyrics were written by Sathyan Anthikkad and G. Sankara Kurup.

No.	Song	Singers	Lyrics	Length (m:ss)
1	"Aalolam Chaanchaadum"	K. S. Chithra	Sathyan Anthikkad	
2	"Chirithookum Thumbi"	K. J. Yesudas, Kamukara	Sathyan Anthikkad	
3	"Illikkaadum"	K. J. Yesudas, K. S. Chithra	Sathyan Anthikkad	
4	"Malsakhee"	Kamukara, Lathika	Sathyan Anthikkad	
5	"Mandamandamen" (Poem) From the poem "Suryakanthi"	K. J. Yesudas	G. Sankara Kurup	
