= Santhakumari (Malayalam actress) =

Indian actress

- Born: Kochi, Kerala, India
- Occupation: Actress
- Years active: 1976–present
- Spouse: Velayudhan (deceased)

Santhakumari is an Indian actress best known for her work in Malayalam cinema. She has acted in more than 250 films, dramas, television serials and short films.

== Biography ==
Santhakumari was born to Narayanan and Karthyayani, as eighth child among ten children, at Kochi, Kerala. She had her primary education from Thevara C.C.P.L.M High school, Ernakulam. She was married to Late Velayudhan and have two daughters. She was presented with a house named "Snehaveedu" in 2012 by Malayalam Movie Artists Assoaciation (AMMA). She received Kerala State film Award for Best Actress in 1977 for Chuvanna Vithukal.

== Awards ==
- 1977 Kerala State Film Award for Best Actress – Chuvanna Vithukal
- 2009 World Malayalee Council India region & Kairali Channel Award
- 2011 Kerala Film Critics Association Awards – Chalachithra Prathibha Award

== Filmography ==
=== 1970s ===
Year	Title	Role	Notes
1977	Chuvanna Vithukal	Bharathi	
1978	Bandhanam	Devakiyamma	
1978	Pathinalaam Raavu	Umma	
1978	Raappadikalude Gaadha		
1978	Kadathanattu Maakkam		
1978	Samayamaayilla Polum		
1978	Manimuzhakkam		
1978	Randu Penkuttikal		
1979	Kannukal	Devaki	
1979	Peruvazhiyambalam	Prabhakaran Pillai's wife	
1979	Ottapettavar		
1979	Devalokam		

=== 1980s ===
Year	Title	Role	Notes
1980	Ishtamaanu Pakshe	Rajagopalan's wife	
1980	Chora Chuvanna Chora	Kamalakshiyamma	
1980	Kadalkattu	Stella	
1980	Kochu Kochu Thettukal	Nurse, Latha's sister	
1980	Lorry	Ammu	
1980	Aniyatha Valakal	Bhargaviyamma	
1980	Paalaattu Kunjikkannan	Chirutheyi	
1981	Avathaaram		
1981	Arikkari Ammu		
1981	Hamsa Geetham		
1981	Thaalam Manasinte Thaalam		
1981	Veliyattam	Lakshmiyamma	
1981	Thakilu Kottampuram	Mridula's mother	
1981	Swarangal Swapnagal	Rani	
1981	Sphodanam	Muthalali's wife	
1981	Munnettam	Gouriyamma	
1981	Sanchari	Soudamini	
1981	Oothikachiya Ponnu	Kalyaniyamma	
1981	Arayannam	Madhu's mother	
1981	Ahimsa	Vasu's mother	
1981	Kathayariyathe	Lady at the railway station	
1981	Aarathi	Nurse	
1981	Thenum Vayambum	Mary Thomas	
1981	Vida Parayum Munpe	Janaki	
1981	Greeshma Jwala	Gaurikuttyamma	
1982	Vidhichathum Kothichathum		
1982	Layam		
1982	Kazhumaram		
1982	Oru Kunju Janikkunnu		
1982	Kanmanikkorumma	Kalyani	
1982	Enthino Pookunna Pookkal	Madhavi	
1982	Ithiri Neram Othiri Kaaryam	Vimala's mother	
1982	Ee Nadu	Dakshyayani	
1982	Saravarsham	Lakshmi Amma	
1982	Snehapoorvam Meera	Achamma	
1982	Post Mortem	Lakshmi	
1982	Innalenkil Nale	Radha	
1982	Ithu Njangalude Katha	Johny's mother	
1983	Oru Mukham Pala Mukham	Rajamma	
1983	Visa	Kuttyalikka' mother	
1983	Prem Nazirine Kanmanilla	Bhargavi	
1983	Ashtapadi	Warassiar	
1983	Thalaam Thettiya Thaarattu	Saradha	
1983	Oomana Thinkal	Nani	
1983	Shesham Kazhchayil	Lathika's mother	
1983	Naseema	Ravi's mother	
1983	Aattakkalaasham	Naniyamma	
1983	Rugma	Januvamma	
1983	Maniyara	Devootee at Ajmeer	
1983	Onnu Chirikku	Rohini's mother	
1983	Engine Nee Marakkum	Kunji	
1983	Nizhal Moodiya Nirangal	Thresya	
1983	Rathilayam	Rathi's mother	
1983	Iniyenkilum	Geetha's mother	
1983	Theeram Thedunna Thira	Sudhakaran's mother	
1983	Aa Rathri	Nun	
1983	Ahankaaram	Radhika's mother	
1983	Onnu Chirikku	Rohini's mother	
1983	Kattathe Kilikkoodu	Meenakshi	
1983	Aaroodham	Naniyamma	
1983	Deeparadhana	Dakshayini	
1983	Surumayitta Kannukal	Amina	
1983	Vaashi		
1983	Kathi		
1983	Swapna Lokam		
1983	Sandhya Mayangum Neram		
1983	Kinginikkombu		
1983	Guru Dakshina	Hostel warden	
1983	Ahangaaram	Radhika's mother	
1984	Anthichuvappu		
1984	Vetta		
1984	Oru Thettinte Katha		
1984	Enta Nandhinikutty		
1984	Unaroo	Pathrose's mother	
1984	Karimbu	Alex's mother	
1984	Nishedhi	Mrs. Rajasekharan	
1984	Idavelakku Shesham	Naniyamma	
1984	Veendum Chalikkunna Chakram	Devakiyamma	
1984	Vanitha Police	Bhavani	
1984	Poochakkoru Mookkuthi	Kalyani	
1984	Manasariyathe	Mammoootty's mother	
1984	Thirakal	Rekha's mother	
1984	Itha Innu Muthal	Santhamma	
1984	Kurishuyudham	Annamma Nurse	
1984	Mynaakam	Janakiyamma	
1984	Ethirppukal	Mariya	
1984	Onnum Mindatha Bharya	Parvathy	
1984	Aattuvanchi Ulanjappol	Janaki	
1984	Sreekrishna Parunthu	Servant	
1985	Omanikkan Ormavaikkan		
1985	Paara		
1985	Thozhil Allengil Jail		
1985	Kaiyum Thlayum Purathidaruthe	Saradha	
1985	Snehicha Kuttathinu	Kausalya	
1985	Idanilangal	Subhadra's mother	
1985	Oru Naal Innoru Naal	Sridevi's mother	
1985	Madhuvidhu Theerum Mumbe	Maria	
1985	Mounam Nombaram	Ammu	
1985	Vilichu Vilikettu	Rema's mother	
1985	Sammelanam	Basheer's mother	
1985	Rangam	Appunni's mother	
1986	Arrest		
1986	Meenamasathile Sooryan		
1986	Bhagavan		
1986	Thidambu		
1986	Sakhavu		
1986	Urukku Manushyan		
1986	Sukhamo Devi		
1986	Ambili Ammavan		
1986	Railway Cross	Ratheesh's adopted mother	
1986	Ice Cream	Ponnamma	
1986	Chilambu	Paramu's mother	
1986	Ilanjippookkal	Sumithra's mother	
1986	Kochuthemmaadi	Naniyamma	
1986	Vartha	Ammukutty	
1986	Ithramathram	Chithra's mother	
1986	Surabhi Yaamangal	Murali's mother	
1986	Veendum	Sukumari	
1986	Gandhinagar 2nd Street	Madhavan's mother	
1986	Ente Entethu Mathrem	Kalyaniyamma	
1986	Ambadi Thannilorunni	Susheela	
1986	Abhayam Thedi	Parukutty	
1986	Aavanazhi	Radhas' mother	
1987	Theekattu	Jayadevan's mother	
1987	Ithrayum Kaalam	Antharjanam	
1987	Rithubhedam	Vinodiniyamma	
1987	Aankiliyude Tharattu	Sarada	
1987	Sreedharante Onnam Thirumurivu	Sadasivan's wife	
1987	Thoovanathumbikal	Radha's mother	
1987	Kalam Mari Katha Mari	Razzak's mother	
1987	Adimakal Udamakal	Sarada	
1987	Archanappookkal	Raji's mother	
1987	Yaagangni	Murdered lady	
1987	Nirabhedangal	Jayadevan's mother	
1987	Naalkavala	Leela	
1987	P.C. 369		
1987	Nadodikkattu		
1987	Ivare Sookshikkuka		
1988	Janmashathru		
1988	Padamudra		
1988	Innaleyude Baakki	Nun	
1988	Charavalayam	Asha	
1988	Abkari	Drunkard's mother	
1988	Kudumbapuranam	Indu's mother	
1988	Ormayilennum	Janakiyamma	
1988	Onninu Purake Mattonnu	Ambujam.	
1989	Kireedam	Devi's mother	
1989	Aval Oru Sindhu		
1989	Rathibhavam		
1989	Oh My Rosy		
1989	Eenam Maranna Kaattu		
1989	Kaliyuga Seetha		
1989	Mudra	Bharathiyamma	
1989	Ashokante Ashwathykuttikku	Nabeesumma	
1989	Varnatheru	Urmila's mother	
1989	Muthukudayum Choodi	Gayathri's mother	
1989	Season	Porinchu's mother	
1989	Adikkurippu	Basheer's mother	
1989	Utharam	Nurse	
1989	Puthiya Karukkal	Leelamma	
1989	Crime Branch	Lakshmiyamma	
1989	Oru Sayahnathinte Swapnam		

=== 1990s ===
Year	Title	Role	Notes
1990	Thazhvaram		
1990	Aaraam Waardil Aabhyanthara Kalaham		
1990	Kalikkalam	Rosi	
1990	Oliyampukal	Tribal lady	
1990	His Highness Abdullah	Saraswathi	
1990	Thoovalsparsham	Nun	
1991	Daiva Sahayam Lucky Center		
1991	Khandakavyam		
1991	Raid		
1991	Nagarathil Samsara Vishayam		
1991	Orutharam Randutharam Moonnutharam	Devayani	
1991	Kakkathollayiram	Jameela	
1991	Parallel College	Bhargavi	
1991	Veendum Oru Aadyarathri		
1991	Uncle Bun	Sister 1	
1991	Venal Kinavukal	Lakshmi	
1992	Savidham		
1992	Rajashilpi		
1992	Soorya Manasam		
1992	Kizhakkan Pathrose	Drama artist	
1992	Aayushkalam	Sujatha's mother	
1992	Ennodu Ishtam Koodamo	Jinachandran's mother	
1992	Ayalathe Adheham	Rajiv's mother	
1992	Vietnam Colony	Colony woman	
1992	Pappayude Swantham Appoos	Servant	
1992	Sargam	Thankamani's mother	
1992	Kamaladalam	Malavika's mother	
1992	Sooryachakram	Lakshmi	
1993	Journalist		
1993	Ponnuchami		
1993	Customs Diary		
1993	Ithu Manjukaalam	Savithri	
1993	Aagneyam	Mammali's mother	
1993	Golanthara Vartha	Headmistress	
1993	Thirasheelakku Pinnil - Neelachithrangalkkethire		
1993	Narayam	Sethulakshmi	
1993	Koushalam	Gopi's mother	
1993	Sthalathe Pradhana Payyans	Saraswathy	
1993	Chenkol	Devi's mother	
1994	Pavithram	Madhavan's mother	
1994	Nandini Oppol	Maya's mother	
1994	Pingami	Sreedevi's mother	
1994	Malappuram Haji Mahanaya Joji	Joji's mother	
1994	Sagaram Sakshi	Narayanan's wife	
1994	Parinayam	Madhavan's mother	
1994	Bharya	Babukuttan's mother	
1994	Chakoram	Madhavi	
1994	Bheeshmacharya		
1994	Sraadham		
1995	Chantha		
1995	Mazhayethum Munpe		
1995	No. 1 Snehatheeram Bangalore North	Servant	
1995	Shilpi	Rahul's mother	
1995	Sundharimare Sookshikkuka	Rema's mother	
1995	Ezharakoottam	Jaanuvamma	
1995	Prayikkara Pappan	Gouri mother	
1995	Sundari Neeyum Sundaran Njanum	Indu's mother	
1995	Aksharam	Kunjikrishna Pothuval's wife	
1996	Thooval Kottaram	Paarukutty	
1996	Kaanaakkinaavu	Aalikka's wife	
1996	Excuse Me Ethu Collegila	Appukuttan's mother	
1996	Azhakiya Ravanan	Sharath's mother	
1996	Kaliveedu	Treesa	
1996	Harbour	Beevathumma	
1997	Maanikyakkoodaaram		
1997	Kalyaana Unnikal	Krishnanunni's mother	
1997	Poonilamazha	Ammu	
1998	Aanappara Achamma		
1998	Meenathil Thalikettu	Malathi's mother	
1998	Mangalya Pallakku	Seethalakshmi's mother	
1999	Veendum Chila Veettukaryangal	Bhavana's mother	
1999	Janani	Eliyamma	
1999	Ustaad	Devakiyamma	
1999	Auto Brothers	Aarifa	
1999	Crime File	Sr. Fisto	

=== 2000s ===
Year	Title	Role	Notes
2000	Nishasurabhikal	Reetha	
2000	Valliettan	Kuttikrishnan Nair's wife	
2001	Spiderman		
2001	Raajapattam		
2001	Chenchaayam	Malu's mother	
2001	Dupe Dupe Dupe	Balu's mother	
2001	Nakshathragal Parayathirunnathu	Devamma	
2002	Swararaagaganga		
2002	Thamaasha Veeran		
2002	Njaan Raajaavu	Thomas's mother	
2002	Sthree Vesham	Swamini Amma	
2002	Jagathy Jagadeesh in Town	Nurse Santhadevi	
2002	Akhila	Sharada	
2003	Thilakkam	Savithri	
2003	Natturajavu	Rubber tapping worker	
2003	Ammakilikkoodu	Inmate of the old age home	
2003	Manassinakkare	Aliyamma	
2003	Janakeeyam	Ravi's mother	
2004	Sasneham Sumithra	Lady at temple	
2004	Rasikan	Ramabhadran's mother	
2004	Sathyam	Raju's mother	
2004	Thaalamelam	Nun	
2005	The Tiger	tea shop vendor	
2005	Hai	Sekharan's mother	
2005	Otta Nanayam	Beggar	
2005	Bharathchandran I.P.S.	Muslim lady	
2006	Mahasamudram	Santha	
2006	Ponmudipuzhayorathu		
2006	Mukhamariyaathe	Velu's wife	
2006	Chakkara Muthu	Servant	
2006	Palunku	Lalitha	
2006	Smart City	Santhamma	
2007	Komban	Radha's mother	
2007	Nivedyam	Amminiyamma	
2007	Soorya Kireedam	Januvamma	
2007	Sketch	Nadhiya's umma	
2007	Kangaroo	Janamma	
2008	Kanal Kannaadi		
2008	Innathe Chintha Vishayam	Amina	
2008	Kanichukulangarayil CBI	Bank customer	
2008	Gopalapuranam	Bhavaniyamma	
2009	Meghatheertham		
2009	Bhagyadevatha	Nabeezumma	
2009	Venalmaram	Kamalakshi	

=== 2010s ===
Year	Title	Role	Notes
2010	Njaan Sanchaari	Devassy's wife	
2010	Thaskara Lahala	Mani's mother	
2010	Kadha Thudarunnu	Lasar's wife	
2010	Kadaksham	Servant	
2010	Holidays	Bus passenger	
2010	Fiddle	Dakshayini	
2011	Dhaanam		
2011	Swargam Nine Kilometer		
2011	Ninnishtam Ennishtam 2	Shalini's House Servant	
2011	Sundara Kalyanam	Shajahan's umma	
2011	Scene No.001	Manikantan's mother	
2011	Happy Durbar	Nelson's mother	
2012	Thappana	Patient	
2012	Masters	Milan's grandmother	
2012	Thanichalla Njan	Antharjanam	
2012	Parudeesa	Johny's mother	
2012	Oru Kudumba Chithram	Mallika's care taker	
2012	Madirasi	Janakiyamma	
2012	Ee Adutha Kaalathu	Vishnu's mother	
2013	Radio		
2013	Ezhamathe Varavu	Tribal Woman	
2013	Romans	Papi's wife	
2013	Housefull	Leelamani	
2013	ABCD: American-Born Confused Desi	Colony lady	
2013	Pothumaappu	Sathar's mother	
2013	Olipporu	Teacher	
2013	Cleopatra	Bhavani	
2013	Weeping Boy	Sahadevan's mother	
2014	Avarude Veedu		
2014	Maramkothi		
2014	Pranayakadha	Elamma	
2014	Ponnarayan	Raghavan's mother	
2014	Iniyum Ethra Dooram	Muthassi	
2014	1983	Mariyamma	
2014	Thomsonvilla	School Principal/Nun	
2014	God's Own Country	Vakkachan's mother	
2014	To Noora with Love	Sreeparvathi's grandmother	
2014	Nerariyathe		Short film
2014	Seconds	Firoz's grandmother	
2015	Iruvazhi Thiriyunnidam		
2015	Moonam Naal		
2015	Namukkore Aakaasham		
2015	Iruvazhi Thiriyunnidam		
2015	Saradhi	Rajani's mother in law	
2015	Nadi	Saraswathiyamma	
2015	White Boys		
2015	1000 – Oru Note Paranja Katha	Janakiyamma	
2015	Alif	Abu's mother	
2015	Rudra Simhasanam	Servant	
2015	Life of Josutty	Geevarghese's mother	
2016	Ottakolam	Kamakshi Amma	
2016	Paulettante Veedu	Santhakumari	
2016	Subhayathra	Short film	
2016	Aruthe		
2016	Plus or Minus	Kalyaniyamma	
2016	Wonderful Journey	Kuriakose's mother	
2016	Kaadhaantharam	Sarasamma	
2016	Noolpaalam	Muthassi	
2016	Leela	Chengalam Omana	
2016	Inspector Dawood Ibrahim	Midwife	
2016	Thoppil Joppan	Roslin's grandmother	
2017	Devayanam		
2017	The Crab	Servant	
2017	Pareeth Pandari	Officer	
2017	Mannam Kattayum Kariyilayum	Raghu's mother	
2018	Khaleefa		
2018	Planner	Ponnamaa	
2018	Parole	Villager	
2018	Mattanchery		
2018	Kenalum Kinarum		
2018	Shirkh	Aayisha	
2018	Nonsense	T.P. Annamma	
2018	Eliyammachiyude Aadyathre Christmas	Kunjannamma	
2018	Madhurameeyathra		
2019	Vallikettu	Santhamma	
2019	Panthu	Sudheesh's mother	
2019	Neeyum Njanum	Tajitha	
2019	Mr. & Ms. Rowdy	Valyammechi	
2019	Daivam Saakshi	Sethu's mother	
2019	Soothrakkaran		
2019	Vishudha Pusthakam	Umaiba	
2019	Muthassikkoru Muthu		
2019	Safe	Old lady in court	
2019	Vikruthi	Bystander	
2019	Makkanna		

=== 2020s ===
Year	Title	Role	Notes
2021	Illam	Bhavani	
2021	Chavara Pithavinte Chavarulukal	Sudhaamma	
2021	Sara's	Servant	
2021	Kaaval	Leelamma	
2021	Pappantem Simontem Piller		
2022	Kumari	Kunjamma Pillai	
2022	Nipah		
2022	He... A Terrorist		Short film
2022	Aquarium	Chettathi	
2023	2018: Everyone is a Hero	Village lady	
2025	The Protector		

== Television career ==
=== Serials ===
- 2023 Balanum Ramayum (Mazhavil Manorama)
- 2021 Kudumbasangamam ( sitcom )
- 2021 Priyankari (Flowers TV)
- 2020 Chackoyum Maryyum (Mazhavil Manorama)
- 2019 Arayannangalude Veedu (Flowers TV)
- 2014 Kuttikale oru Kali Parayam (Kochu TV)
- 2017 Ammuvinte Amma (Mazhavil Manorama)
- 2017 Chinthavishtayaya Seetha (Asianet)
- 2016 Jagratha (Amrita TV)
- 2014 Bhagyadevatha (TV series) (Mazhavil Manorama)
- 2013 Pattu Saree (Mazhavil Manorama)
- 2012 Chattambi Kalyani (Jaihind TV)
- 2011 Guru (Jaihind TV)
- 2013 Abhinetri (Surya TV)
- 2009 Vallarpadathamma(Shalom)
- 2009 Nilavillakku (Surya TV)
- 2011 Pattukalude-Pattu (Surya TV)
- 2010 Indraneelam (Surya TV)
- 2006 Priyam (Kairali TV)
- 2008 Gajarajan Guruvayur Keshavan (Surya TV)
- 2009 Manassariyathe (Surya TV)
- 2008 Magalude Amma (Surya TV)
- 2004 Kayamkulam Kochunni (Surya TV)
- 2001 Swantham Malootty(Surya TV)
- 2006 Manasi (Doordarshan)
- 2008 Vishudha Thomasleeha (Asianet)
- 2007–2009 Alilathali (Asianet)
- 2008 Kanal Kireedam (Asianet)
- 2004 Omanathingalpakshi (Asianet)
- 2001:Sthree(Asianet)
- 2000 Samayam
- Agnisakshi
- Melappadam
- Sindoorakuruvi
- Kashithumbi

=== Other shows ===
- Nanmayude Nakshathrangal (Telefilm) (KAIRALI TV)
- Mazhameghangal (Telefilm)
- Monoottante Onam (Telefilm) (SURYA TV)
- Snehathinte Mullukal (Telefilm) (DD MALAYALAM)
- Cindrella (Telefilm)(DD MALAYALAM)
- The Sacrificial Love (Telefilm) (Shalom TV)
- Comedy Festival (Reality Show) (MAZHAVIL MANORAMA) – Supporting Artist
- Oli Mangatha Tharakal (Interview) (SURYA TV)
- Sreevishnumayaarchana (Album), Devasangeetham (Asianet PLUS)
- Kusrithikanna (Album)
- Ente Kanniyathra (Album)
- Katha Ithuvare
- Riya Electronic Chalk (Advertisement)
- G- mobile (Advertisement)
- Sarigama – Game show

== Dramas ==
- Prethalayam
- Layabhangam
- Jwalanam
