= List of Malayalam films of 1981 =

The following is a list of Malayalam films released in the year 1981.

Opening		Sl. No.	Film	Cast	Director	Music director	Notes
J A N	9	1	Ariyappedatha Rahasyam	Prem Nazir, Jayan	P. Venu	M. K. Arjunan	
J A N	23	2	Arayannam	Sukumaran, Sathar	P. Gopikumar	Pukazhenthi	
J A N	23	3	Thadavara	Jayan, K. P. Ummer	P. Chandrakumar	A. T. Ummer	
J A N	30	4	Greeshma Jwala	Ratheesh, Sukumaran	P. G. Vishwambharan	A. T. Ummer	
J A N	30	5	Orikkal Koodi	Madhu, Sukumaran	I. V. Sasi		
F E B	6	6	Thaalam Manasinte Thaalam	Prem Nazir, Sheela	A. T. Abu	G. Devarajan	
F E B	6	7	Kaloopasana	Jagathy Sreekumar, Venu Nagavally	Ahuan Sebastian	K. Raghavan	
F E B	13	8	Kolilakkam	Madhu, Jayan	P. N. Sundaram	M. S. Viswanathan	
F E B	21	9	Aakkramanam	Madhu, Jayan	Sreekumaran Thampi	Shyam	
F E B	26	10	Sanchari	Prem Nazir, Jayan	Boban Kunchacko	K. J. Yesudas	
M A R	3	11	Theekkali	Prem Nazir, Jayabharathi	J. Sasikumar	G. Devarajan	
M A R	12	12	Pinneyum Pookkunna Kaadu	Madhu, Ratheesh	Srini	Shyam	
M A R	12	13	Nidra	Lalu Alax Vijay Menon, Shanthi Krishna	Bharathan	G. Devarajan	
M A R	12	14	Kathayariyathe	Srividya, Sukumaran	Mohan	G. Devarajan	
M A R	12	15	Asthamikkatha Pakalukal	Prem Nazir, Jose	A. Sheriff	A. T. Ummer	
M A R	20	16	Arikkari Ammu	Madhu, Jayabharathi	Sreekumaran Thampi	V. Dakshinamoorthy	
M A R	20	17	Abhinayam	T. Jayasree, Jayan, Vidhubala	Baby	K. J. Yesudas	
M A R	20	18	Danda Gopuram	Madhu, Srividya	P. Chandrakumar	Shyam	
A P R	2	19	Oppol	Menaka, Balan K. Nair	K. S. Sethumadhavan	M. B. Sreenivasan	
A P R	9	20	Ira Thedunna Manushyar	Madhu, Jayabharathi	K. Sukumaran Nair	G. Devarajan	
A P R	9	21	Sphodanam	Sukumaran, M. G. Soman, Mammootty	P. G. Viswambharan	Shankar–Ganesh	
A P R	9	22	Choothaattam	Prem Nazir, Jayabharathi	K. Sukumaran Nair	Shyam	
A P R	10	23	Thushaaram	Ratheesh, Seema	I. V. Sasi	Shyam	
A P R	10	24	Kaattu Kallan	Prem Nazir, Sukumaran	P. Chandrakumar	A. T. Ummer	
A P R	24	25	Swarangal Swapnagal	Soman, Jayabharathi, Srividya	A. N. Thampi	G. Devarajan	
M A Y	1	26	Kodumudikal	Prem Nazir, Jayabharathi	J. Sasikumar	M. K. Arjunan	
M A Y	1	27	Maniyan Pilla Adhava Maniyan Pilla	Maniyanpilla Raju, Venu Nagavally	Balachandra Menon	G. Devarajan	
M A Y	8	28	Agnisaram	Jayan, Jose Prakash	A. B. Raj	M. K. Arjunan	
M A Y	9	29	Ellaam Ninakku Vendi	Prem Nazir, Srividya	J. Sasikumar	V. Dakshinamoorthy	
M A Y	29	30	Valarthumrugangal	Ratheesh, Sukumaran	Hariharan	M. B. Sreenivasan	
J U N	5	31	Veliyattam	Menaka, M. G. Soman	P. T. Rajan	M. K. Arjunan	
J U N	12	32	Thakilu Kottampuram	Prem Nazir, Sheela	Balu Kiriyath	Darsan Raman, P. Susheeladevi	
J U N	19	33	Kilungaatha Changalakal	Prem Nazir, Sumalatha	C. N. Venkita Swamy	A. T. Ummer	
J U N	26	34	Kallan Pavithran	Nedumudi Venu, Adoor Bhasi	P. Padmarajan	Shyam	
J U L	3	35	Paathira Sooryan	Prem Nazir, Jayabharathi	K. P. Pillai	V. Dakshinamoorthy	
J U L	3	36	Sneham Oru Pravaaham	Jagathy Sreekumar, Sukumaran	Dr. Shajahan	K. J. Joy	
J U L	3	37	Venal	Sukumaran, Nedumudi Venu	Lenin Rajendran	M. B. Sreenivasan	
J U L	10	38	Parankimala	Sukumari, Nedumudi Venu	Bharathan	G. Devarajan	
J U L	10	39	Inaye Thedi	Kalasala Babu, Sankaradi	Antony Eastman	Johnson	
J U L	17	40	Vayal	Soman, Shuba	Antony Eastman	G. Devarajan	
J U L	24	41	Agni Yudham	Jayabharathi, Jagathy Sreekumar	N. P. Suresh	A. T. Ummer	
J U L	29	42	Saahasam	M. G. Soman, Sumalatha	K. G. Rajasekharan	Shankar–Ganesh	
J U L	31	43	Sankharsham	Prem Nazir, Sukumaran, Ratheesh	P. G. Vishwambharan	Shankar–Ganesh	
J U L	31	44	Kaahalam	Prem Nazir, Raveendran, Nanditha Bose	Joshiy	A. T. Ummer	
A U G	7	45	Munnettam	Mammootty, Ratheesh	Sreekumaran Thampi	Shyam	
A U G	7	46	Avatharam	Sukumaran, Seema	P. Chandrakumar	A. T. Ummer	
A U G	14	47	Garjanam	Madhavi, Rajnikanth	C. V. Rajendran	Ilaiyaraaja	
A U G	14	48	Dhanya	Srividya, Mohanlal	Fazil	Jerry Amaldev	
A U G	14	49	Sreeman Sreemathi	Srividya, Vijayan	Hariharan	G. Devarajan	
A U G	21	50	Attimari	Prem Nazir, Jayabharathi	J. Sasikumar	K. J. Joy	
A U G	21	51	Prema Geethangal	Ambika, Shanavas	Balachandra Menon	Johnson	
A U G	21	52	Thrasam	Aravindan, Balan K. Nair	Padiyan		
A U G	28	53	Kolangal	Thilakan, Nedumudi Venu	K. G. George		
S E P	4	54	Raktham	Prem Nazir, Madhu	Joshiy	Johnson	
S E P	5	55	Chaatta	KPAC Lalitha, Nedumudi Venu	Bharathan		
S E P	10	56	Vida Parayum Munpe	Prem Nazir, Nedumudi Venu	Mohan	M. B. Sreenivasan	
S E P	10	57	Sambhavam	Madhu, Srividya	P Chandrakumar	V. Dakshinamoorthy	
S E P	10	58	Enne Snehikkoo Enne Maathram	Srividya, Ratheesh	P. G. Vishwambharan	K. V. Mahadevan	
S E P	10	59	Vazhikal Yaathrakkar	Shubha, Sukumaran	A. B. Raj	Ben Surendar	
S E P	10	60	Parvathy	Prem Nazir, Latha	Bharathan	Johnson	
S E P	25	61	Dhruvasangamam	Mohanlal, Manavalan Joseph	J. Sasikumar	Raveendran	
S E P	28	62	Guha	Jagathy Sreekumar, Mini	M. R. Jose	Shankar–Ganesh	
O C T	2	63	Dwandha Yudham	Adoor Bhasi, Kuthiravattam Pappu	C. V. Hariharan	Jerry Amaldev	
O C T	2	64	Manassinte Theerthayathra	Shubha, Sukumaran	Thamban	M. B. Sreenivasan	
O C T	2	65	Cancerum Laingeekia Rogangalum		P. R. S. Pillai		
O C T	7	66	Thaaraavu	Srividya, Nedumudi Venu	Balachandra Menon	Raveendran	
O C T	8	67	Adima Changala	Prem Nazir, Sheela	A. B. Raj	M. K. Arjunan	
O C T	16	68	Archana Teacher	Madhu, Sukumari	P. N. Menon	Shyam	
O C T	30	69	Ilaneer	Nedumudi Venu, Sreenivasan	Sithara Venu	Shyam	
O C T	30	70	Poocha Sanyasi	Sukumari, Rajkumar	Hariharan	K. J. Yesudas	
O C T	30	71	Thrishna	Mammootty, Rajalakshmi	I. V. Sasi	Shyam	
O C T	30	72	Swarnappakshikal	Sukumaran, Nedumudi Venu	P. R. Nair	Raveendran	
O C T	30	73	Kadathu	Prem Nazir, Shankar	P. G. Vishwambharan	Shyam	
O C T	30	74	Oridathoru Phayalvaan	Rashid, Nedumudi Venu	P. Padmarajan	Johnson	
N O V	12	75	Aarathi	Sukumaran, Mala Aravindan	P. Chandrakumar	M. B. Sreenivasan	
N O V	17	76	Urukku Mushtikal	Prem Nazir, Sheela	K. P. Jayan	Shyam	
N O V	17	77	Thenum Vayambum	Prem Nazir, Mohanlal	Ashok Kumar	Raveendran	
N O V	20	78	Karimpoocha	Ratheesh, Seema	Baby	K. J. Joy	
N O V	20	79	Njan Ninne Marakkilla	Sukumaran, Ambika	Vijay	Guna Singh	
N O V	27	80	Hamsa Geetham	Seema, Ratheesh	I. V. Sasi	Shyam	
N O V	27	81	Itha Oru Dhikkari	Prem Nazir, Jayabharathi	N. P. Suresh	A. T. Ummer	
D E C	4	82	Visham	Srividya, Ratheesh	P. T. Rajan	Raghu Kumar	
D E C	4	83	Aambal Poovu	Sukumaran, Jose	Harikumar	V. Dakshinamoorthy	
D E C	11	84	Oothikachiya Ponnu	Poornima Jayaram, Shankar	P. K. Joseph	M. K. Arjunan	
D E C	11	85	Nizhal Yudham	Sukumaran, Ravikumar	Baby	K. J. Joy	
D E C	25	86	Ammakkorumma	Ratheesh, Jagathy Sreekumar	Sreekumaran Thampi	Shyam	
D E C	25	87	Thaaravu	Madhu, Srividya	Jeassy	K. J. Yesudas	
D E C	31	88	Ahimsa	Ratheesh, Mammootty	I. V. Sasi	A. T. Ummer	
D E C	31	89	Aparna	Prathap Pothen, Balakrishna Pillai	C. P. Padmakumar		
			Elippathayam				
			Randu Mukhangal				

== Dubbed films ==
Title	Director(s)	Original film		Cast	Ref.
Title	Director(s)	Film	Language	Cast	Ref.
Chattambi Krishnan	Vijaya Nirmala				
I Love You	Nandan				
Sapthapathy	K. Viswanath				
Panneer Pushpangal	Bharathy Vasu	Panneer Pushpangal	Tamil	Suresh, Shantikrishna	
Oru Thalai Ragam	T. Rajender	Oru Thalai Ragam	Tamil		
Oridathoru Mandravathi	Mani Murugan				
Jeevikkan Padikkanam	Singeetam Srinivasa Rao	Sommokadidhi Sokokadidhi	Telugu	Kamal Haasan, Jayasudha, Rojaramani	
Siva Mahima					
Njan Njanalla	Shankar Nag	Janma Janmada Anubandha			
Nancy	Singeetam Srinivasa Rao				
Bala Nagamma	K. Sankar				
Vamshavriksham	Bappu			Kamal Haasan, Madhavi	
