= Varkey =

Varkey is a variant of the Saint Thomas Christian (Nasrani) name Geevarghese which itself is a variant of George. It is commonly given as the first name or found as a last name among the Christians of Kerala.

== Notable people with this name ==
- C. J. Varkey, Kuzhikulam (1921–2009), Indian Roman Catholic priest
- Chunkath Joseph Varkey (1891–1953), Indian academic, journalist and politician
- Muttathu Varkey (1913–1989), Indian writer and poet
- Ponkunnam Varkey (1910–2004), Indian writer and activist
- Sunny Varkey (born 1957), Indian businessman
- T. V. Varkey (born 1938), Indian writer, academic and activist
- Varkey Vithayathil (1927–2011), Indian cardinal

== See also ==
- Varkeys, Indian supermarket chain
