= Sahasam =

Sahasam may refer to:

- Saahasam (1981 film), an Indian Malayalam-language film of 1981
- Sahasam (1992 film), an Indian Telugu-language film
- Sahasam (2013 film), an Indian Telugu-language film
- Sahasam (2025 film), an Indian Malayalam-language film
- Saagasam, a 2016 Indian Tamil-language film

== See also ==
- Sahasame Jeevitham, a 1984 Indian Telugu-language film
- Sahasam Cheyara Dimbhaka, a 1988 Indian Telugu-language film
- Sahasame Naa Oopiri, a 1989 Indian Telugu-language film by Vijaya Nirmala
- Sahasam Swasaga Sagipo, a 2016 Indian Telugu-language film by Gautham Menon
