= Thodu Dongalu =

Thodu Dongalu or Todu Dongalu (lit. 'Thieves Too') may refer to these Indian films:

- Thodu Dongalu (1954 film), a 1954 Telugu film directed by D. Yoganand starring N. T. Rama Rao
- Thodu Dongalu (1981 film), a 1981 Telugu film directed by K. Vasu starring Krishna and Chiranjeevi

== See also ==
- Thodu Needa, a 1965 Telugu film directed by Adurthi Subba Rao
