= Jalaja =

Indian actress

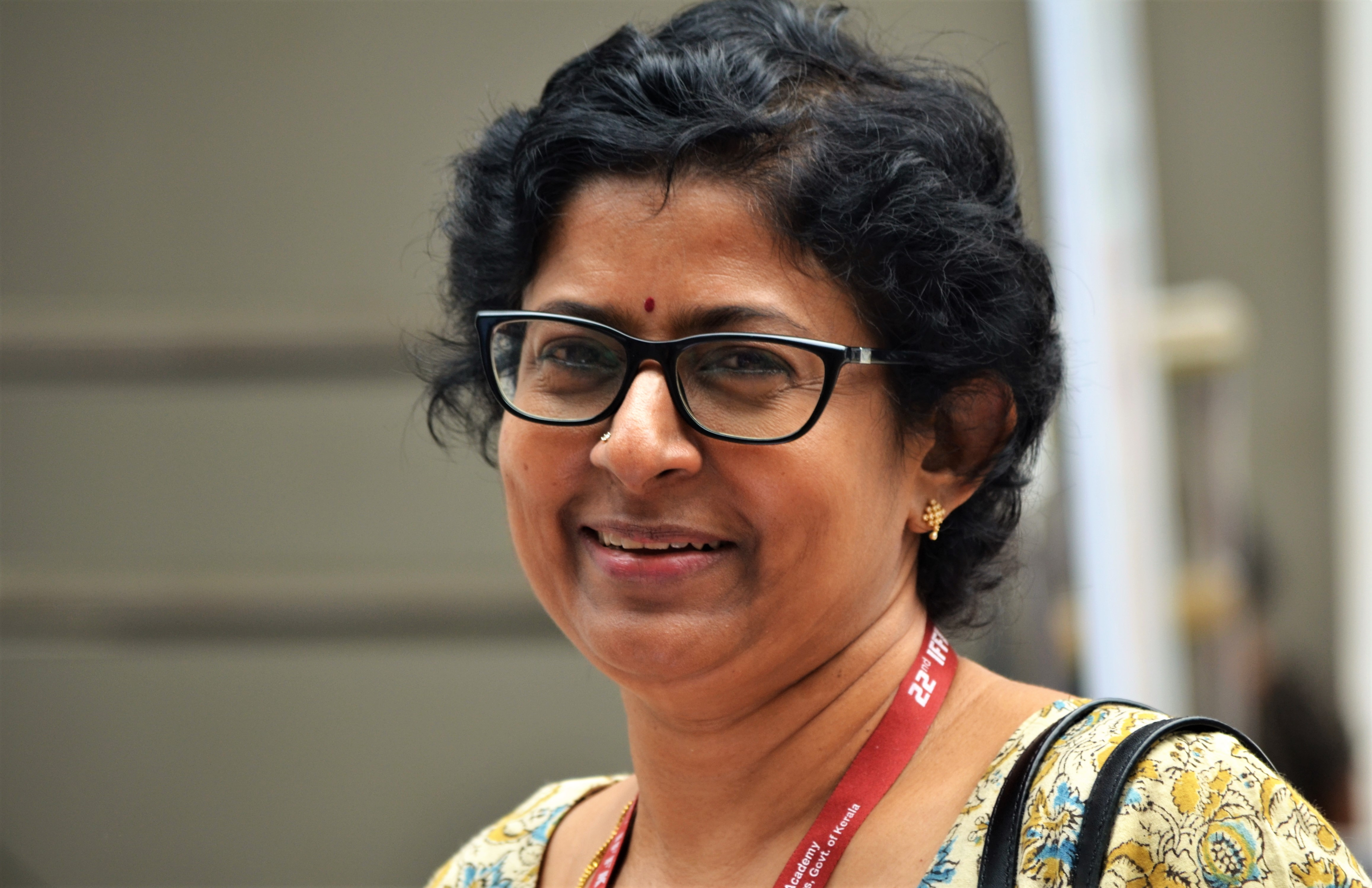
- Born: 16 August 1961 (age 65); Kuala Lumpur, Federation of Malaya
- Education: St. Joseph's College for Women, Alappuzha; Government College for Women, Thiruvananthapuram
- Occupation: Actor
- Years active: 1979‍–‍1989; 2021‍–‍present
- Spouse: Prakash Nair (m. 1993)
- Children: 1

Jalaja (born 13 December 1961) is an Indian actress known for her work in Malayalam cinema as well as some Tamil films during the 1970s and 1980s. She won Kerala State Film Award for Best Actress and Filmfare Award for Best Actress in 1981 for the movie Venal, directed by Lenin Rajendran. Her family roots are from Kollam and Alappuzha district, Kerala.

== Personal life ==
Jalaja was born on 13 December 1961 to Malayali couple Prof. Thakazhiyil Vasudevan Pillai and Saraswathiyamma in Kuala Lumpur. She studied there before migrating to India during her fourth grade, due to a civil war in Malaysia.

She had her primary education from Asan Memorial Senior Secondary School, Madras, Ambalappuzha English Medium School and her Pre-degree from St. Joseph's College for Women, Alappuzha. She did her bachelor's degree and Masters in English Literature from Government College for Women, Thiruvananthapuram.

Jalaja is married to Prakash Nair since 3 September 1993 and has settled in Bahrain after marriage. They have a daughter Devi. She was a jury member for the 2014 Kerala State Film Awards.

== Awards ==
Kerala State Film Awards:

- 1981 Best Actress - Venal
- 1981 Filmfare Award for Best Actress - Venal

== Filmography ==
=== Malayalam ===
List of Malayalam film credits
| Year | Title | Role | Notes |
|---|---|---|---|
| 1977 | Ivanente Priyaputhran | | |
| 1978 | Thampu | | |
| 1978 | Ee Ganam Marakkumo | Theater artist | |
| 1978 | Mattoly | Thankam | |
| 1978 | Randu Penkuttikal | | |
| 1979 | Sayoojyam | Radha | |
| 1979 | Ulkadal | Susanna | |
| 1979 | Kannukal | Malathi | |
| 1979 | Radha Enna Pennkutti | Radha | |
| 1979 | Prathishta | | |
| 1980 | Shalini Ente Koottukari | Ammu | |
| 1980 | Vilkkanundu Swapnangal | Sreedevi | |
| 1980 | Sooryante Maranum | Mallika | |
| 1980 | Chaakara | Jiji | |
| 1980 | Aarohanam | Photographer's wife | |
| 1980 | Raagam Thaanam Pallavi | Jaanu | |
| 1980 | Vedikkettu | Suja | |
| 1980 | Chora Chuvanna Chora | Sundari | |
| 1980 | Adhikaram | Rema | |
| 1980 | Hridayam Paadunnu | Sarasu | |
| 1980 | Abhimanyu | | |
| 1980 | Veera Simham | | |
| 1981 | Munnettam | Jaanu | |
| 1981 | Arayannam | Devi | |
| 1981 | Thakilu Kottampuram | Padmaja | |
| 1981 | Greeshmam | Rathi | |
| 1981 | Elippathayam | Sridevi | |
| 1981 | Venal | Ramani | |
| 1981 | Ithihasam | Rani | |
| 1981 | Vayal | Nandinikutty | |
| 1981 | Aambalpoovu | Prema | |
| 1981 | Swarnapakshikal | Lakshmi | |
| 1981 | Aakkramanam | Saleena | |
| 1981 | Pinneyum Pookkunna Kaadu | | |
| 1981 | Thaalam Manasinte Thaalam | | |
| 1981 | Vazhikal Yaathrakkar | | |
| 1981 | Yakshikkavu | | |
| 1981 | Jalarekha | | |
| 1981 | Prema Geethangal | | |
| 1981 | Inganeyum Oru Penkutty | | |
| 1982 | Yavanika | Rohini | |
| 1982 | Marmaram | Nirmala | |
| 1982 | Balloon | Kausu | |
| 1982 | Koritharicha Naal | Revathi | |
| 1982 | Padayottam | Aisha | |
| 1982 | Sooryan | Leela | |
| 1982 | Post Mortem | Aswathy | |
| 1982 | Ithiri Neram Othiri Karyam | Reetha | |
| 1982 | Chillu | Ananthu's lover | |
| 1982 | Kanmanikkorumma (Ushnabhoomi) | Radha / Actress Anitha | |
| 1982 | Sheshakriya | | |
| 1982 | Uvvu | | |
| 1982 | Komaram | | |
| 1982 | Yagam | | |
| 1983 | Karyam Nissaram | Sarala | |
| 1983 | Mandanmmar Londanil | Ammini | |
| 1983 | Kodumkattu | Sindhu | |
| 1983 | Passport | Nabeesa | |
| 1983 | Kattaruvi | Radha | |
| 1983 | Oru Swakaryam | Uma | |
| 1983 | Prathigna | Sainaba | |
| 1983 | Visa | Sabira | |
| 1983 | Onnu Chirikku | Urmila Menon | |
| 1983 | Eettillam | Kusumam | |
| 1983 | Kathi | | |
| 1983 | Kinginikombu | | |
| 1983 | Vaashi | | |
| 1983 | Pankayam | | |
| 1983 | Arunayude Prabhatham | | |
| 1984 | Kooduthedunna Parava | Salma | |
| 1984 | Athirathram | Seetha | |
| 1984 | Kudumbam Oru Swargam Bharya Oru Devatha | Radha | |
| 1984 | Aashamsakalode | Chakki | |
| 1984 | NH 47 | Nazeera | |
| 1984 | Kodathi | Sindhu | |
| 1984 | Onnum Mindatha Bharya | Adv. Vinodini | |
| 1984 | Aalkkoottathil Thaniye | Sindhu | |
| 1984 | Ethirppukal | Geetha | |
| 1984 | Ente Nandinikuttikku | | |
| 1984 | Anthichuvappu | | |
| 1984 | Kurishuyudham | | |
| 1985 | Madhuvidhu Theerum Mumbe | Shobha | |
| 1985 | Upaharam | Dr. Roopa | |
| 1985 | Sammelanam | Selma | |
| 1985 | Ozhivukalam | Nandhini | |
| 1985 | Naayakan | Haseena | |
| 1985 | Kandu Kandarinju | Padmam | |
| 1985 | Mouna Nombaram | Sathi | |
| 1985 | Manicheppu Thurannappol | Sunny's sister | |
| 1985 | Chillukottaram | | |
| 1985 | Oduvil Kittiya Vaartha | | |
| 1986 | Ithramathram | Chithra | |
| 1986 | Naale Njangalude Vivaham | Vimala | |
| 1986 | Kochu Themmadi | Madhavikutty | |
| 1986 | Kariyilakkattu Pole | Ragini | |
| 1986 | Desatanakkili Karayarilla | Sara teacher | |
| 1986 | Ennennum Kannettante | Vijayalakshmi | |
| 1986 | Prathyekam Sradhikuka | Shobha | |
| 1986 | Neram Pularumbol | Asha | |
| 1986 | Nidhiyude Katha | | |
| 1987 | Vilambaram | Razeena | |
| 1987 | Sarvakalashala | Sister Alphonsa | |
| 1987 | Sairandhri | Latha | |
| 1987 | Kaanan Kothichu | | |
| 1988 | Athirthikal | Devi | |
| 1988 | Abkari | Ammini | |
| 1988 | Aparan | Sumangala teacher | |
| 1988 | Oru Muthassi Katha | Parvathi | |
| 1988 | Manu Uncle | Manu's elder sister | |
| 1988 | Mukunthetta Sumitra Vilikkunnu | Gopi's wife | |
| 1988 | Kayyettam/Production No.1 | | |
| 1989 | Alicinte Anveshanam | Alice | |
| 1989 | Charithram | Gracy | |
| 1989 | Mahaayaanam | Ramani | |
| 1991 | Perumthachan | Devaki | |
| 1991 | Kalamorukkam | Chandrika | |
| 1991 | Kuttapathram | Geetha | |
| 1991 | Aparahnam | Lathika | |
| 1992 | Snehasagaram | Marykkunju | |
| 2014 | Kadalkaattiloru Doothu | Herself | |
| 2021 | 8½ Intercuts: Life and Films of K.G. George | Herself | |
| 2021 | Malik | Jameela | |
| TBA | Thalanarizha | TBA | |

=== Tamil ===
List of Tamil film credits
| Year | Title | Role | Notes |
|---|---|---|---|
| 1980 | Antharangam Oomaiyanathu | Sarasu | |
| 1983 | Maarupatta Konangal | Jaya | |
| 1984 | Thiruttu Rajakkal | | |
| 2025 | Thug Life | special appearance | |

== Television serials ==
- Indraneelam (Surya TV)
- Verukal (Asianet) as Amlu - based on Malayattoor Ramakrishnan's Novel Directed by T.N. Gopakumar
- Ammuvukku Kalyanam as Gayathri (DD Tamil) - Tamil Serial
