= Uvvu =

- Directed by: Ben Marcose
- Starring: Jalaja; Sankar Mohan
- Music by: M. B. Sreenivasan
- Release date: 12 November 1982
- Country: India
- Language: Malayalam

Uvvu is a 1982 Indian Malayalam film, directed by Ben Marcose. The film stars Jalaja and Sankar Mohan in the lead roles, and features a musical score by M. B. Sreenivasan.

== Cast ==
- Jalaja
- Sankar Mohan

== Soundtrack ==
The music was composed by Sreenivasan and the lyrics were written by O. N. V. Kurup.

No.	Song	Singers	Lyrics	Length (m:ss)
1	"Ennu Ninne Kandu"	K. J. Yesudas	O. N. V. Kurup	
2	"Manjuthulliyude Kunju Kavililum"	K. J. Yesudas, S. Janaki	O. N. V. Kurup	
3	"Nilaavu Veenu Mayangi"	S. Janaki	O. N. V. Kurup	
4	"Thithithara Poikakkarayilu"	Chorus, C. O. Anto	O. N. V. Kurup	
