= Sooryan (1982 film) =

1982 film by J. Sasikumar

- Directed by: J. Sasikumar
- Written by: P. M. Nair
- Screenplay by: P. M. Nair
- Produced by: Babu
- Starring: Ajayan; Sukumaran; Jalaja; M. G. Soman
- Cinematography: Rajkumar
- Edited by: V. P. Krishnan
- Music by: Johnson
- Production company: Anjaneya Movies
- Distributed by: Anjaneya Movies
- Release date: 12 November 1982
- Country: India
- Language: Malayalam

Sooryan is a 1982 Indian Malayalam film, directed by J. Sasikumar and produced by Babu. The film stars Ajayan, Sukumaran, Jalaja and M. G. Soman in the lead roles. The film has musical score by Johnson.

== Cast ==
- Meena
- Ajayan (Brother of Late action super star Jayan)
- Sukumaran as Gopinadhan Nair
- Jalaja as Leela
- M. G. Soman as Venu
- Nellikode Bhaskaran
- Poornima Jayaram as Ammini
- KPAC Sunny as Jailer
- Sankaradi as A. R. C. Menon
- Ravikumar as Unni
- Manavalan Joseph
- Vijay babu

== Soundtrack ==
The music was composed by Johnson and the lyrics were written by Kavalam Narayana Panicker.

No.	Song	Singers	Lyrics	Length (m:ss)
1	"Ithiri Thiri Thirayilakunnu"	Vani Jairam, Chorus	Kavalam Narayana Panicker	
2	"Kannallaathathellaam"	Unni Menon, C. O. Anto, P. Padma	Kavalam Narayana Panicker	
3	"Poonthen Kulirurava"	K. J. Yesudas	Kavalam Narayana Panicker	
4	"Ullilppookkum Poonchola"	P. Jayachandran, Vani Jairam	Kavalam Narayana Panicker	
