= Thaayillamal Naan Illai =

- Theatrical release poster
- Directed by: R. Thyagarajan
- Screenplay by: Sandow M. M. A. Chinnappa Thevar; Thooyavan (dialogues)
- Story by: Sandow M. M. A. Chinnappa Thevar
- Produced by: C. Dhandayuthapani
- Starring: Kamal Haasan; Sridevi
- Cinematography: P. N. Sundaram
- Edited by: M. G. Balu Rao
- Music by: Shankar–Ganesh
- Production company: Thevar Films
- Release date: 14 April 1979
- Running time: 135 minutes
- Country: India
- Language: Tamil

Thaayillamal Naan Illai (transl. I cannot live without my mother) is a 1979 Indian Tamil-language film directed by R. Thyagarajan. The film stars Kamal Haasan, Sridevi, Major Sundarrajan and Jai Ganesh, with Rajinikanth and Nagesh in guest roles. It was released on 14 April 1979.

== Plot ==
Raja, the son of a poor and widowed washerwoman, is well-talented in the arts from his childhood. A man who runs a drama troupe is impressed with Raja's talent and enlists him in this troupe and Raja's mother travels with the troupe as well. While performing in a zameen with the troupe, Raja meets and falls in love with the zamindar's daughter Bhuvana and they engage in a secretive romance assisted by Bhuvana's pet peacock Vadivelan. When the zamindar becomes aware of their relationship, he agrees to get them married only if Raja cuts all ties with his mother, considering her poor status. Raja refuses and unable to convince her adamant father, Bhuvana elopes with Raja and joins the troupe as well. This enrages the zamindar's villainous nephew Mohan, who had been eyeing the zameen's ownership by marrying Bhuvana. Whether Raja and Bhuvana are able to thwart the odds against them form the rest of the story.

== Cast ==
- Kamal Haasan as Raja
- Sridevi as Bhuvana
- Rajinikanth as Bichwa Bakri (guest appearance)
- Nagesh as Mannargudi Minor (guest appearance)
- Jai Ganesh as Mohanasundaram
- Major Sundarrajan as Jameen
- Thengai Srinivasan as Master of Drama
- Sukumari as Sivakami
- Madhu Malini as Jaya
- Suruli Rajan as Sigamani
- Sachu as Pavani
- V. Gopalakrishnan as Village people
- Y. G. Mahendran as Drama artist
- Idachappuli Selvaraj as Drama artist
- Typist Gopu as Karkoda
- Pakoda Kadhar as Kadhar

== Production ==
Kamal Haasan was given a "curly wig" and he grew a French beard to portray his character. This was the last film in which Haasan, Sridevi and Rajinikanth acted together.

== Soundtrack ==
All songs are composed by Shankar–Ganesh.

Tamil
No.	Title	Lyrics	Singer(s)	Length
1.	"Vadivelan Manasu Vachaan"	Kannadasan	T. M. Soundararajan, P. Susheela	3:41
2.	"Nadiganin Kaadhali"	Vaali	S. P. Balasubrahmanyam	4:56
3.	"Vanakkam Vanakkam" (Naveena Allidurbar Natakam)	Vaali	T. M. Soundararajan, P. Susheela, S. C. Krishnan and Chorus	5:48
4.	"Eena Meena"	Vaali	P. Susheela	3:33
5.	"Podi Vaikkiren"	Vaali	S. P. Balasubrahmanyam	4:09
Total length:				22:07

For the dubbed Hindi version, the lyrics were written by Madhukar.

Hindi
No.	Title	Lyrics	Singer(s)	Length
1.	"Ina Mina Yeh Aankhen Meri"	Madhukar	Vani Jairam
2.	"Iss Kadar Ishq Se Laj Sharam Kis Liye"	Madhukar	Raj Sitaraman
3.	"Mantar Tere Jadoo Mantar Tere"	Madhukar	Raj Sitaraman
4.	"Matwala Mann Ho Gaya"	Madhukar	Raj Sitaraman, Vani Jairam

The movie was dubbed into Telugu as Patagadu

Telugu (dubbed)
No.	Title	Singer(s)	Length
1.	"Valvese Paruvamulle"	S. P. Balasubrahmanyam, P. Susheela
2.	"Podi Jallutha"	S. P. Balasubrahmanyam
3.	"Asale Rashiga"	S. P. Balasubrahmanyam
4.	"Vandhanam Vandhanam"	S. P. Balasubrahmanyam, S. P. Sailaja, Madhavapeddi Ramesh
5.	"Aade Pade"	P. Susheela

== Release ==
Thaayillamal Naan Illai was released on 14 April 1979, and ran for over 200 days in theatres. It was dubbed into Hindi as Aakhri Sangram in 1984.
