= Sooryante Maranum =

- Directed by: Rajeevnath
- Written by: T. V. Varkey; Rajeevnath (dialogues)
- Screenplay by: Rajeevnath
- Produced by: Rajeevnath
- Starring: Nedumudi Venu; Ravi Alummoodu; Purushothaman; K. S. Gopinath
- Cinematography: Madhu Ambatt
- Edited by: Rajeevnath
- Production company: Harisree Films International
- Distributed by: Harisree Films International
- Release date: 30 December 1980
- Country: India
- Language: Malayalam

Sooryante Maranum is a 1980 Indian Malayalam film, directed and produced by Rajeevnath. The film stars Nedumudi Venu, Ravi Alummoodu, Purushothaman and K. S. Gopinath in the lead roles.

== Cast ==
- Nedumudi Venu as Aditya
- Ravi Alummoodu
- Purushothaman
- K. S. Gopinath
- Jalaja
- Joseph Chacko
- Mannar Gopi
- Rajan Thazhakkara
- Shanthan
