= Aval Oru Sindhu =

- Directed by: P. K. Krisavalorusihnan
- Written by: P. K. Krishnan
- Starring: Sathaar; Kuthiravattam Pappu; Ravi Menon; Sudheer
- Music by: Rajamani
- Production company: Samskara Films
- Distributed by: Samskara Films
- Release date: 25 December 1989
- Country: India
- Language: Malayalam

Aval Oru Sindhu is a 1989 Indian Malayalam film, directed by P. K. Krishnan. The film stars Sathaar, Kuthiravattam Pappu, Ravi Menon and Sudheer in the lead roles. The film's musical score is by Rajamani.

== Cast ==
- Sathaar
- Kuthiravattam Pappu
- KES Brahmakulam
- Ravi Menon
- Pattom Sadan
- Jose
- Ravi Menon
- Jayarekha
- Sudheer
- T. G. Ravi
- Jayalalita
- Sudha
- Lalitha Sri
- Santhakumari

== Soundtrack ==
The music was composed by Rajamani and the lyrics were written by Poovachal Khader.

No.	Song	Singers	Lyrics	Length (m:ss)
1	"Naadu Vittu Naaduchutti"	M. G. Sreekumar	Poovachal Khader	
2	"Thaaridum Yowvanam"	Vani Jairam	Poovachal Khader	
3	"Thammil Thammil Swapnam"	K. S. Chithra, Unni Menon	Poovachal Khader	
