= Carnivel =

- Directed by: P. G. Viswambharan
- Written by: S. N. Swamy
- Produced by: Shyney Films
- Starring: Mammootty; Parvathy; Sukumaran; Babu Antony
- Cinematography: J. Williams
- Edited by: K. Sankunni
- Music by: Shyam
- Production company: Shyney Films
- Distributed by: Shyney Films
- Release date: 27 July 1989
- Country: India
- Language: Malayalam

Carnivel is a 1989 Malayalam comedy film written by S. N. Swamy and directed by P. G. Viswambharan. The film centres on the backdrops of a carnival. It stars Mammootty, Parvathy, Sukumaran and Babu Antony in pivotal roles. The film was shot in Thrissur and nearby areas including Puthukkad during March April 1989.

== Cast ==
- Mammootty as Bharathan
- Parvathy as Gowri
- Sukumaran as Chandrappan aka Bhai
- Babu Antony as James
- Siddique as Sidhu
- Mala Aravindan as Govindan
- Bobby Kottarakkara as Peethambaran
- V. K. Sriraman as Cyriac Kureekkadan
- Usha as Vanaja
- Bindiya as Asha
- Valsala Menon as Kamalamma
- Kozhikode Santha Devi as Gowri's mother
- R. V. Kunjikkuttan Thampuran as Panicker
- Kundara Johny as Pocker
- Kunchan as Lobo
- M.S. Thripunithura as Head Constable Kanaran

== Plot ==
Bharathan is a local tough guy who causes some issues at a carnival. The pragmatic carnival owner, Bhai, hires Bharathan and his buddies to perform daredevil and other events at the carnival. Bharathan loves Gouri, but she falls into bad circumstances, including being arrested for prostitution.

James, Bhai's right hand man gets in good with the local corrupt Police Inspector Cyriac Keerikaddan. James who is sleeping with Bhai's wife ends up murdering Bhai.

Bharathan ends up in jail for confronting James and Gouri apparently commits suicide. Bharathan finds out that the corrupt Inspector Keerikaddan had murdered Gouri in attempting to rape her.

When Bharathan is released he confronts his enemies.

== Box office ==
The film did average business.

== Additional information ==
Some of the challenging shots in action scenes by the late cinematographer J. Williams have received recognition.
