= Manya Mahajanangale =

- Directed by: A. T. Abu
- Written by: N. P. Muhammed https://en.wikipedia.org/wiki/N._P._Mohammed
- Screenplay by: N. P. Muhammed https://en.wikipedia.org/wiki/N._P._Mohammed
- Produced by: Alavi N.
- Starring: Mammootty; Chithra; Prem Nazir; Adoor Bhasi
- Cinematography: P. S. Nivas
- Edited by: G. Venkittaraman
- Music by: Shyam
- Production company: Akshara Films
- Distributed by: Akshara Films
- Release date: 14 June 1985
- Country: India
- Language: Malayalam

Manya Mahajanangale is a 1985 Indian Malayalam film, directed by A. T. Abu and produced by Alavi N. The film stars Mammootty, Chithra, Prem Nazir and Adoor Bhasi in the lead roles. The film has musical score by Shyam.

== Cast ==
- Mammootty as Devan
- Chithra as Vimala
- Prem Nazir as Nizar Ahammed
- Adoor Bhasi as Vakachan
- Sabitha Anand aa Suhra
- Seema as Sainu
- T. G. Ravi as Raghavan
- Mala Aravindan as Onthu Keshavan
- Philomina as Ayisha
- Kuthiravattam Pappu as Kuttans
- Shanavas as Tony
- Tony as College student
- Cochin Haneefa as Basheer
- Kunjandi as Master Krishnan Nair
- Rajan Padoor as Politician

== Soundtrack ==
The music was composed by Shyam and the lyrics were written by Poovachal Khader.

| No. | Song | Singers | Lyrics | Length (m:ss) |
|---|---|---|---|---|
| 1 | "Arayannakkili" | K. J. Yesudas, Unni Menon, Lathika | Poovachal Khader | |
| 2 | "Kandille Kandille" | K. J. Yesudas, Chorus, C. O. Anto | Poovachal Khader | |
| 3 | "Maanyamahaajanangale" | P. Jayachandran, Unni Menon, C. O. Anto | Poovachal Khader | |
| 4 | "Pathinezhaam Vayassinte" | S. Janaki, Chorus | Poovachal Khader | |
