= Onnu Chirikku =

- Directed by: P. G. Viswambharan
- Starring: Mammootty; Swapna; Adoor Bhasi; Raj Kumar; Jalaja
- Music by: Johnson
- Release date: 28 October 1983
- Country: India
- Language: Malayalam

Onnu Chirikku is a 1983 Indian Malayalam-language film, directed by P. G. Viswambharan. The film stars Mammootty, Swapna, Adoor Bhasi, Raj Kumar and Jalaja in the lead roles. The film has musical score by Johnson.

== Cast ==
- Mammootty as Unnikrishnan
- Swapna as Rohini Menon
- Adoor Bhasi as Krishnan Nair
- Raj Kumar as Raju
- Jalaja as Urmila Menon
- K. P. Ummer as Govindankutty
- Sukumari as Radha
- Sankaradi as Ananthapadmanabhan Iyer
- Nedumudi Venu as Dr. George
- Santhakumari as Rohini's mother
- Vadivukkarasi as Rohini's elder sister
- Kundara Johnny

== Soundtrack ==
The music was composed by Johnson with lyrics by Poovachal Khader.

No.	Song	Singers	Lyrics	Length (m:ss)
1	"Nee Manassin Thaalam"	Vani Jairam, Unni Menon	Poovachal Khader	
2	"Nee Manassin Thaalam" (M)	K. J. Yesudas	Poovachal Khader	
3	"Sankalppangal Poochoodum"	K. J. Yesudas	Poovachal Khader	
