= Surekha (actress) =

Indian actress

- Born: Sureka marie 16 November 1964 (age 62); Andhra Pradesh

Surekha Marie was an Indian actress. She was known for her roles in the 1980s in Malayalam, Tamil, Kannada, and Telugu films. Her debut role in the Bharathan movie Thakara was well noted for her performance.

== Family ==
Surekha was married to Sreenivas, a doctor, who in died in 1995 She had a daughter, Katherine. She left the film field after marriage. Then she concentrated on business. She owned a production company called Chennai Media Plus. She made a comeback through a 2012 movie Masters. She resided at Chennai with family.

== Filmography ==
List of Surekha film credits
Year	Title	Role	Language	Notes
1976	Thoorpu Padamara	-	Telugu	
1978	Karunamayudu	Mother Mary	Telugu	
1979	Prabhu	Sandhya	Malayalam	
1979	Thakara	Subhashini	Malayalam	
1980	Aarohanam	Geetha	Malayalam	
1980	Angadi	Karthi	Malayalam	
1980	Mounathinte Shabdham		Malayalam	
1980	Biligiriya Banadalli		Kannada	
1981	Ellam Inba Mayyam	Gomathi	Tamil	
1981	Greeshma Jwala	Valli	Malayalam	
1981	Kilungatha Changalakal		Malayalam	
1982	Thadakom	Sulekha	Malayalam	
1982	Sindoora Sandhyakku Mounam	Kumar's fiancée	Malayalam	
1982	Novemberinte Nashtam	Ambika	Malayalam	
1982	Innalenkil Nale	Ayisha	Malayalam	
1982	John Jaffer Janardhanan	Manju	Malayalam	
1982	Thunaivi	Seetha	Tamil	
1982	Ee Nadu	Chembakam	Malayalam	
1982	Njan Ekananu		Malayalam	
1982	Nallathu Nadanthe Theerum	–	Tamil	
1983	Onnu Theriyadha Pappa		Tamil	
1983	Praja Shakthi		Telugu	
1984	Aattuvanchi Ulanjappol	Hema	Malayalam	
1984	Vellimohangal		Malayalam	
1984	Gadusu Pindam	–	Telugu	
1985	Ambada Njane		Malayalam	
1985	Mulamoottil Adima	Devamma	Malayalam	
1985	Muhurtham Pathnonnu Muppathinu	Dr. Neelima	Malayalam	
1985	Pelli Meeku Akshintalu Naaku		Telugu	
1985	Vannu Kandu Keezhadakki	Geetha	Malayalam	
1986	Katturumbinum Kathu Kuthu	Prasannakumari	Malayalam	
1986	Chekkaeran Oru Chilla	Savithri	Malayalam	
1986	Ice Cream	Seema	Malayalam	
1987	Ithrayum Kalam	Saraswathy	Malayalam	
1991	Ganga		Telugu	
1992	Kaaval Geetham	Purse owner	Tamil	
1992	Idhuthanda Sattam		Tamil	
1993	Aathma		Tamil	
2012	Masters	Sheetal's mother	Malayalam	
2014	Manjapai		Tamil	
2014	Paris Payyans		Malayalam	
2015	Vasuvum Saravananum Onna Padichavanga	Ambujam	Tamil	
2016	Poy Maranju Parayathe	Radhamma	Malayalam	
2017	Zebra Varakal	Jalaja	Malayalam	
2023	Kolai	Judge Lakshmidevi	Tamil	
TBA	Madhil Mel Kadhal		Tamil	

== TV serials ==
List of Surekha television serials credits
Year	Serial	Role	TV	Language
1989	Vishwa Mithra		DD National	Hindi
1992	Aihithyamala	DD Keralam	Producer	Malayalam
2010–2011	Madhavi		Sun TV	Tamil
2011–2013	Uthiri Pookal	Krishna Veni	Sun TV	Tamil
2013	Abhinethri		Surya TV	Malayalam
2013	Valli	Bhagyam (Valli's mom)	Sun TV	Tamil
2013–2016	Azhagi	Chandra	Sun TV	Tamil
2014–2015	Chandralekha	Lakshmi	Sun TV	Tamil
2014	Mannan Magal		Jaya TV	Tamil
2015–2018	Deivamagal	Sampoornam	Sun TV	Tamil
2015–2016	Priyasaki		Zee Tamil	Tamil
2023-2024	Ninnishtam Ennishtam		Surya TV	Malayalam
