= Kaattaruvi =

- Directed by: J. Sasikumar
- Written by: Manu; P. M. Nair (dialogues)
- Screenplay by: P. M. Nair
- Starring: Mammootty; Sukumaran; Jalaja
- Cinematography: A. S. Musaliyar
- Music by: G. Devarajan
- Production company: Siya Movies
- Distributed by: Siya Movies
- Release date: 22 July 1983
- Country: India
- Language: Malayalam

Kaattaruvi is a 1983 Indian Malayalam film, directed by J. Sasikumar. The film stars Sukumaran and Jalaja in the lead roles. The film has musical score by G. Devarajan.

== Plot ==
Munni (Sukumaran) a tea estate worker loves Radha (Jalaja) a tea picker. The estate owner, Mathachan, (TG Ravi) has his eye on Radha too. When Munni gets into a fight with Vasu (Mammootty) he is brought before Mathachan who tells him to back off from Radh. Munni gets fired for refusing and calling out the estate owner's intentions.

Vasu approaches Radha after asking her father for her hand in marriage, but she rebuffs him.

The estate owner's alcoholic son James (Rajkumar Sethupathi) is keen on Mala (Unni Mary), Munni's sister, which triggers Munni's ire and Munni strikes him after getting shot at by James.

As a result, Vasu and a couple of other workers attack Munni on James' orders. Munni gets stabbed, but ultimately stabs and kills one of the workers.

When arrested, Munni states he acted in self defense. The honest Police Inspector refuses a bribe from Mathachan intended to stop his further investigation of the matter. The inspector discovers that James had shot at Munni.

In the meantime, union leader P Pathrose (Allumooden) solicits money from various parties, promising various investigation outcomes, and Munni breaks out of jail.

Munni gets shot by Police and falls in a river, and the Police inform his family that he is dead. Once again P Pathrose solicits funds.

Radha who is pregnant with Munni's child intends to kill herself. Vasu promises to marry her and save her honour. James continues drinking and carousing much to Mathachan's continued displeasure.

Meanwhile Munni has survived and works in a city elsewhere where he meets James who is reforming and offers to help Munni by passing money on to his mother and sister and letting them know he's alive. Mala begins to like James, but James' alcoholism has destroyed his health and he returns to drinking.

Radha gives birth to Munni's child and Vasu proves to be a good and selfless husband and stepfather. When Mathachan brings a gold chain for the baby, Vasu and Radha refuse, because they're concerned about the gossip about Mathachan's intentions. Their rejection hurts him and he reveals that Radha is actually his daughter. Mathachan's grief compounds with the death of James.

Munni returns and discovers that Radha has married Vasu and takes his child in a rage hurting Radha. Vasu intervenes and a fight ensues resulting in Vasu and the child almost falling down a cliff. Munni saves them and is then apprehended by the Police.

== Cast ==
- Sukumaran as Munni
- Jalaja as Radha
- Mammootty as Vasu
- Unni Mary as Mala
- T. G. Ravi as Estate owner, Mathachan
- Rajkumar Sethupathi as Jameskutty
- Manavalan Joseph
- Ajayan
- Alummoodan
- Mannar Radhakrishnan
- Meena as Achamma
- Anuradha
- Prameela as Chellamma
- Kanakalatha as Lillykutty

== Soundtrack ==
The music was composed by G. Devarajan and the lyrics were written by A. P. Gopalan.

No.	Song	Singers	Lyrics	Length (m:ss)
1	"Dooram Ethra Dooram"	K. J. Yesudas	A. P. Gopalan	
2	"Graampoo Manam"	P. Jayachandran, P. Madhuri	A. P. Gopalan	
3	"Inku Nukarnnurangi"	K. J. Yesudas	A. P. Gopalan	
4	"Karppoorachaanthum Kuriyumaninju"	K. J. Yesudas	A. P. Gopalan	
