= Madhu Malini =

Indian actress

Madhu Malini (born Rukhsana) was an Indian film actress who was predominantly active in Hindi cinema from the early 1970s through to the late 1980s, appeared in over 60 films. She also appeared in some Tamil, Telugu, Malayalam and Punjabi films. She was known for her resemblance to actress Hema Malini and took her surname when entering the film industry.

She died in mysterious circumstances in the late 1980s. Her exact date and cause of death is unknown.

== Career ==
She was originally named Rukhsana and took up the stage name Madhu Malini, due to her resemblance to Hema Malini. Her career began in the 1970s with supporting roles in Hindi films such as Pratigya (1975), Muqaddar Ka Sikandar (1978), Ek Duje Ke Liye (1981), Laawaris (1981), Avtaar (1983) and Hum Dono (1985). She also did several films in Tamil, Telugu, Punjabi and Malayalam languages. Her last film was Bhed Bhav in 1988.

== Death ==
She was mysteriously found dead in her apartment in the late 1980s at the age of 33. Her exact date of death or cause is unknown though there were rumours she died from brain flu

== Filmography ==
Year	Title	Role	Language	Notes
1965	Noor Mahal		Hindi	
1969	Dharti Kahe Pukarke		Hindi	
1972	Jai Jwala		Hindi	
1973	Phir Aya Toofan		Hindi	
1974	Shubdin		Hindi	
1975	Phanda		Hindi	
1975	Pratiggya	Ajit's sister	Hindi	
1975	Do Thug		Hindi	
1976	Zid		Hindi	
1976	Filmi Duniya Filmi Log		Hindi	
1977	Dream Girl		Hindi	
1977	Shankar Hussain	Shankar & Hussain's sister	Hindi	
1978	Dil Aur Deewaar	Blackmailer's associate	Hindi	
1978	Muqaddar Ka Sikandar	Mihru	Hindi	
1978	Bhagyalaxmi		Hindi	
1979	Ranjha Ikk Tey Heeran Do	Rani	Punjabi	
1979	Nauker	Shobha	Hindi	
1979	Dada	Bobby (Bihari's daughter)	Hindi	
1979	Thaayillamal Naan Illai	Jaya	Tamil	
1979	Uthiripookkal	Shenbagam	Tamil	
1979	Meena Kumari Ki Amar Kahani		Hindi	
1980	Bharat Ki Santan		Hindi	
1980	Yeh Kaisa Insaf?	Sharda Nath	Hindi	
1980	Trilok Sundari		Hindi	
1980	Teen Ekkey	Sona	Hindi	Maharani of Sonapur
1980	Thaliritta Kinakkal		Malayalam	
1980	Chora Chuvanna Chora	Gouri	Malayalam	
1980	Prema Kanuka		Telugu	
1981	Laawaris	Madhu Singh	Hindi	
1981	Ek Duuje Ke Liye	Devi	Hindi	
1981	Kanoon Aur Mujrim		Hindi	
1981	Meena Kumari Ki Amar Kahani		Hindi	
1981	Arayannam	Nalini	Malayalam	
1981	Thodu Dongalu		Telugu	
1981	Devara Aata		Kannada	
1981	Jugnie		Punjabi	
1982	Aamne Samne	Rekha	Hindi	
1982	Khud-Daar	Farida	Hindi	
1982	Sun Sajna	Champa	Hindi	Gopi's girlfriend
1982	Johny I Love You	Shop-keeper	Hindi	
1982	Bezubaan	Vija	Hindi	Kalpana's girlfriend
1982	Tadap		Hindi	
1982	Dil Hi Dil Mein	Geeta Anand	Hindi	
1982	Chambal Ke Daku		Hindi	
1982	Bura Aadmi		Hindi	
1982	Pedda Gedda		Kannada	
1983	Taqdeer	Alka Rai	Hindi	
1983	Avtaar	Zubeida A. Ahmed	Hindi	
1983	Sun Meri Laila	Salma	Hindi	
1983	Ambri	Ambri	Hindi	
1983	Razia Sultan		Hindi	
1983	Sweekar Kiya Maine	Parminder Kaur 'Pammi'	Hindi	
1983	Kalakar	Sheela	Hindi	
1983	Ek Din Bahu Ka	Madhu	Hindi	Uncredited
1984	Boxer	Rajni's girlfriend	Hindi	Uncredited
1984	Zakhmi Sher		Hindi	
1984	Shapath	Shanoo	Hindi	Vijay's sister
1984	All Rounder	Kalyani	Hindi	
1984	Aakhri Sangram		Hindi	
1984	Bad Aur Badnam		Hindi	
1984	Mali Methan		Gujarati	
1985	Pyar Jhukta Nahin	Mala Mathur	Hindi	
1985	Hum Dono	Sapna	Hindi	
1985	Salma		Hindi	
1985	Maujaan Dubai Diyan	Madhu	Punjabi	
1986	Kaanch Ki Deewar	Mary	Hindi	
1986	Zindagani	Dancer in restaurant	Hindi	
1986	Uddhar		Hindi	
1986	Inteqam Ki Aag	Maya	Hindi	
1986	Bhulekha		Punjabi	
1987	108 Teerthyatra	Ingla	Hindi	
1988	Woh Mili Thi	Shamli	Hindi	
1988	Bhed Bhav		Hindi	Final film role
