= Katturumbinum Kathu Kuthu =

- Directed by: Girish
- Written by: Salim Cherthala
- Screenplay by: Salim Cherthala
- Starring: Jagathy Sreekumar; Innocent; Mukesh; KPAC Lalitha
- Cinematography: Dhananjayan
- Edited by: E. M. Madhavan
- Music by: Kannur Rajan
- Production company: Sareena Movies
- Distributed by: Sareena Movies
- Release date: 16 February 1986
- Country: India
- Language: Malayalam

Katturumbinum Kathu Kuthu is a 1986 Indian Malayalam film, directed by Girish. The film stars Jagathy Sreekumar, Innocent, Mukesh and KPAC Lalitha in the lead roles. The film has a musical score by Kannur Rajan.

== Cast ==
- Mukesh as Soman
- Maniyanpilla Raju as Babu
- Surekha as Prasanna K. Pilla
- KPAC Lalitha as Janakiyamma
- Nedumudi Venu as P. R. Keshava Pilla
- Jose as Prashobhan K. Pilla
- Lissy as Prabha K. Pilla
- Mala Aravindan as Johnny
- Jagathy Sreekumar as Gillet Sett
- Innocent
- K. P. A. C. Azeez
- Lalithasree
- Thodupuzha Vasanthi

== Soundtrack ==
The music was composed by Kannur Rajan and the lyrics were written by Panthalam Sudhakaran.

No.	Song	Singers	Lyrics	Length (m:ss)
1	"Amritham Choriyum"	K. J. Yesudas, K. S. Chithra	Panthalam Sudhakaran	
2	"Katturumbinum Kaathu Kuthi"	Chorus	Panthalam Sudhakaran	
