= Zindagani =

- DVD cover
- Directed by: Prabhat Roy
- Written by: Faiz Salim
- Produced by: S. Mazumdar
- Starring: Raakhee; Mithun Chakraborty; Rati Agnihotri
- Music by: R. D. Burman
- Release date: 3 July 1986
- Running time: 135 minutes
- Country: India
- Language: Hindi

Zindagani is a 1986 Indian Hindi-language action drama film directed by Prabhat Roy, starring Raakhee, Mithun Chakraborty, Rati Agnihotri in lead roles, along with Ranjeet, Amjad Khan, Suresh Oberoi in supporting roles.

== Cast ==
- Raakhee as Sumitra
- Mithun Chakraborty as Anand
- Rati Agnihotri as Anuradha "Anu"
- Ranjeet as Natwar Dada
- Amjad Khan as Bhola
- Suresh Oberoi as Sudarshan
- Seema Deo as Mrs. Sudarshan
- Iftekhar as Thakur
- Paintal as Mantu
- Madhu Malini as Dancer

== Soundtrack ==
Song	Singer
"Pyar Ka Hoon Main Deewana, Dar Mujhe Kiska"	Kishore Kumar, Annette Pinto
"Jab Se Mile Ho Tum"	Lata Mangeshkar
"Kab Dogi, Kab Dogi, Pyar Mujhe Kab Dogi"	Asha Bhosle, Suresh Wadkar
"Tum Tum Ho To Hum Bhi Hai Kam Nahin"	Asha Bhosle, Shailendra Singh
