= Atham Chithira Chothy =

1986 film directed by A. T. Abu

- Directed by: A. T. Abu
- Written by: P. M. Taj
- Screenplay by: A. T. Abu
- Produced by: Saleem Babu P. A.
- Starring: Mukesh; Nedumudi Venu; Nadiya Moithu; Innocent
- Cinematography: Vipin Das
- Edited by: G. Venkittaraman
- Music by: Shyam
- Production company: Clarions
- Distributed by: Clarions
- Release date: 1 August 1986
- Country: India
- Language: Malayalam

Atham Chithira Chothy is a 1986 Indian Malayalam film, directed and produced by A. T. Abu. The film stars Mukesh, Nedumudi Venu, Nadiya Moithu and Innocent in the lead roles. The film has musical score by Shyam.

== Cast ==
- Mukesh as Rajan
- Nedumudi Venu as Mukundan
- Nadhiya Moidu
- Innocent
- Beena
- Abutty
- Lissy
- Chithra
- Kunjandi
- Mala Aravindan
- Sabitha Anand
- T. G. Ravi
- Valsala Menon

== Soundtrack ==
The music was composed by Shyam and the lyrics were written by Poovachal Khader.

No.	Song	Singers	Lyrics	Length (m:ss)
1	"Kalyaanarekhayulla Kayyil"	K. J. Yesudas, Chorus	Poovachal Khader	
2	"Kalyaanarekhayulla Kayyil"	P. Susheela, Chorus	Poovachal Khader	
3	"Maarivillin Naattukaari"	K. J. Yesudas	Poovachal Khader	
4	"Vazhi Maranna Yaathrakkare"	K. J. Yesudas	Poovachal Khader	
