= St. Joseph's College for Women, Alappuzha =

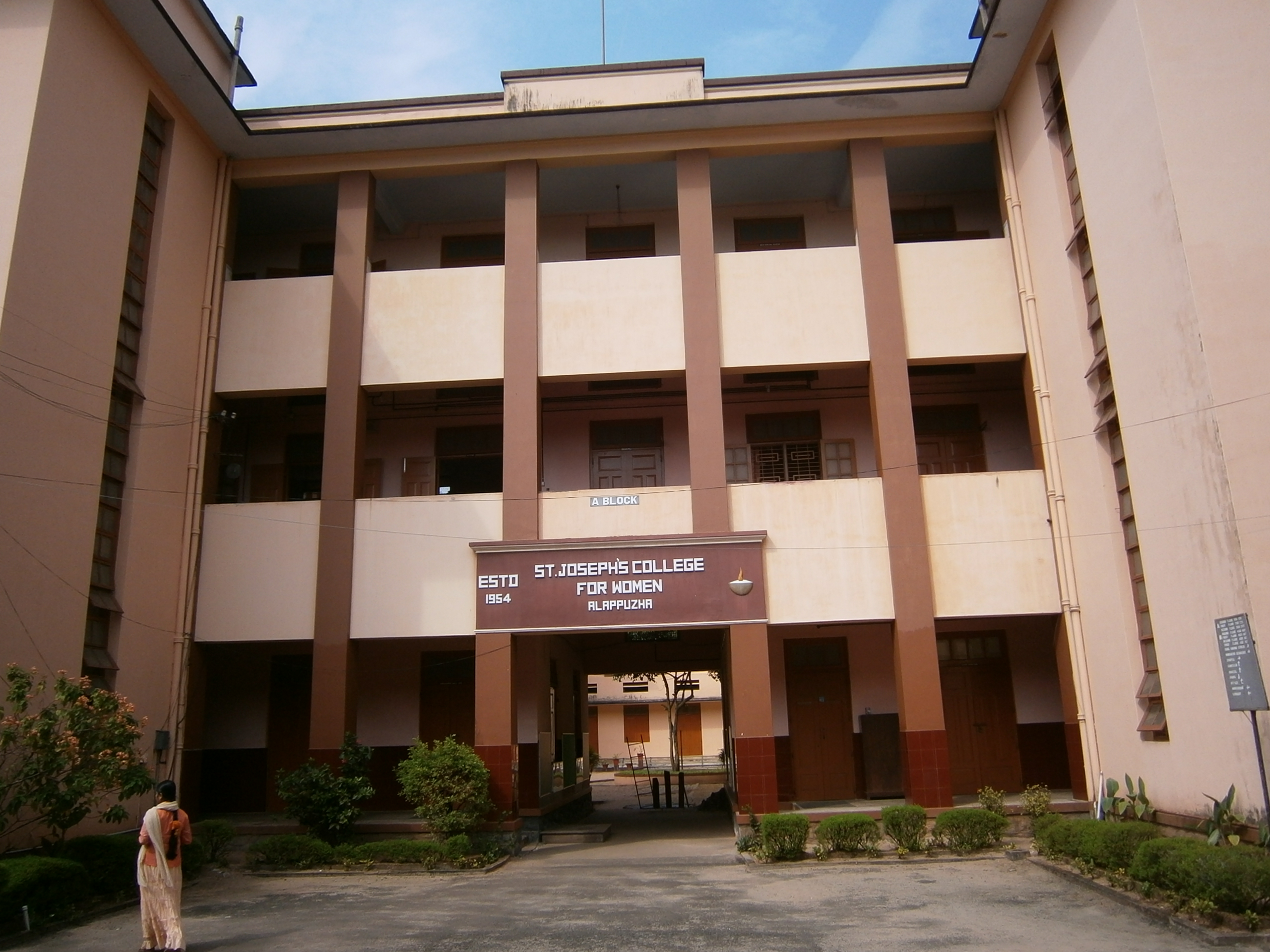
- Type: Public
- Established: 1954; 72 years ago
- Affiliations: University of Kerala
- Location: Alappuzha, Kerala, India
- Campus: Urban
- Website: www.stjosephscollegeforwomen.org

St. Joseph's College for Women, Alappuzha, is a Catholic women's college in Alappuzha, Kerala, India, affiliated with the University of Kerala. Situated at Convent Square on National Highway 47, it is the first such college in Alappuzha district.

The college offers degrees in mathematics, physics, chemistry, botany, zoology, home science, English literature, communicative English, commerce and history, Postgraduate degrees in English language and literature, Physics, Chemistry and nutrition and dietetics and PhD programmes in Chemistry and Physics. The college has been able to combine the core values of higher education upheld by the Higher Educational Council and NAAC with its vision - one that secured the institution a position in the NIRF BAND 150-200 in 2023 and, an 'A+' grade with a CGPA of 3.44 out of 4 by NAAC in the fourth cycle in 2024. In 2024, the college also retained its position in the NIRF BAND of 150–200 and secured the 13th position in the KIRF rankings, making it the first in the Alappuzha district.

Established in 1954, by the Canossian Daughters of Charity, an international congregation of missionary sisters. It is the only college operated by the Canossian Daughters of Charity. The college offers 10 undergraduate, 4 postgraduate and 2 doctoral programmes.

== History ==
St. Joseph's College for Women was set up in 1954 by the Canossian Daughters of Charity, a global assemblage of preacher sisters. The Canossians are a universal gathering established by St. Magdalene of Canossa, of Verona, Italy, who communicated her conviction that "Instruction is the most requesting segment of the apostolate however it is the best since it regularly decides one's direct of life."

Sri. Chithira Thirunal Balarama Varma, the Rajapramukh of Travancore, established the framework stone on 18 April 1953. The school authoritatively appeared on first July, 1954. Fire up. M. Fernanda Riva was the primary head.

What began as a junior school under the authority of M. Fernanda Riva, the primary principal has crossed the limit of 50 years in 2004–05. It has now formed into a school with undergraduate courses in 10 subjects and postgraduate courses in 3 subjects with a couple of additional in the pipeline, and a few authentication and extra courses offered for the improvement of the students.

== Governing body ==
St. Joseph's College for Women takes into account around 1,275 understudies with the help of around 62 school personnel including perpetual workforce and visitor personnel and 22 non-teaching staff. Among the school personnel, about 40% have Ph.D. also, a large portion of the rest have M. Phil. as their most elevated degree while a few are in the process of getting their doctorate. Several individuals from the staff are occupied with remotely supported research ventures while a few have finished activities.

The college was granted B++ Grade with a CGPA of 2.87 on a size of four in the third NAAC accreditation process led in 2018.

== Facilities ==
- Hostel
- Computer lab

== Placement ==
The center gives orientation and guidance for preparing various competitive examinations like UGC/CSIR, Bank tests, PSC exams, Civil Service etc.

== Departments ==
=== Department of Botany ===
The Department was built up in 1956. It offers B.Sc. Botany course and Horticulture as the open course.

The department keeps up a professional flowerbed. There are two labs. There is a biotechnology look into lab.

=== Department of Chemistry ===
"Intelligence and Character"

Branch of Chemistry was set up in 1954. Mrs. Saraswathy Nair and Sr. Genevieve DeSilva were the educating workforce. B.Sc. Science was begun in 1957. the primary cluster of B.Sc. Science understudies turned out effectively in 1960. The year 1998-99 saw the commencement of UGC supported occupation arranged degree course for clinical nourishment and dietetics, science as one of the fundamental subject.

=== Department of Commerce ===
Commerce was presented as a subject of concentrate at the Pre-Degree level in 1984. Smt. A. Mary Helen was named as educating staff. Be that as it may, the Department of Commerce was set up in the year 1989. Smt Rita Latha D'couto was named.

=== Department of English ===
The PG Department of English in St. Joseph's College for Women was built up at the commencement of the school, on first July 1954. It began working initially to take into account the middle of the road/Pre-certificate level understudies, and for the General English understudies at the Degree level. In 1971, it made its mark when the Under Graduate Course in English Language and Literature was introduced. The first since forever Post Graduate Course in the school was begun in English Language and Literature in 1999. In 2014, another Career Related college class in English and Communicative English was started to take into account the changing occasions and needs.

=== Department of History ===
The division of History was begun in 1956 as an UG program with an enlistment of 6 understudies under the direction of Rev. Mother Fernanda, the primary principal and HOD of History. Presently there are 210 understudies for the course.

=== Department of Zoology ===
The Department of Zoology was built up in 1959. Prof. Marykutty George was the principal leader of the office.

Recent activity

They Invited E Kunhikrishnan, Environmentalist, for a discussion on the topic "Biodiversity Conservation in Western Ghats" on 5 October 2019.

=== Department of Physics ===
Division of Physics was set up as the absolute starting point of the institution. In 1966 the Degree course in Physics was begun and In 2001 Post Graduation. The first Head of the Department, Prof. Chandrika Devi resigned in 1990, leaving the seat open to experienced staff.

Dr. Rose Leena Thomas is the leader of the office from 2019 to 2020.

== Notable alumni ==
- Devi Chandana, dancer and cine artiste
- Jalaja, Malayalam actress
- Saranya Mohan, actress
- Mini Antony, IAS officer.
- M. Margaret Peter, former mother general of the Canossian Congregation
