= Kattukuthira =

- Poster
- Directed by: P. G. Viswambharan
- Written by: S. L. Puram
- Produced by: A. K. K. Bappu
- Starring: Thilakan; Vineeth; Anju; Kaviyoor Ponnamma; Innocent
- Cinematography: Saroj Padhi
- Edited by: G. Venkitaraman
- Music by: Johnson
- Production company: Arakkal Films
- Distributed by: Pratheeksha Pictures
- Release date: 1990
- Running time: 112 minutes
- Country: India
- Language: Malayalam

Kattukuthira (transl. Wild horse) is a 1990 Malayalam-language drama film directed by P. G. Viswambharan and scripted by S. L. Puram, based on his classic play of the same name. The film stars Thilakan as the cantankerous Kochuvava along with Vineeth, Anju, and Kaviyoor Ponnamma in the supporting roles. It narrates the story of a poor, lower caste man's rise to power, and his revenge against an aristocratic family. Released on 20 July 1990, it emerged a major commercial success. P. G. Viswambharan won the Kerala Film Critics Association Awards for Best Director for the film.

== Plot ==
Kochuraman is the village toddy collector, belonging to the Ezhava caste, with a well-built body and a strong personality. Kochuraman leads a simple and happy life with his wife and son, Kochuvava. Manorama "Thampuratti" is the daughter of a feudal lord of the ruling Kshatriya family in the village. Thampuratti falls for Kochuraman and tries to seduce him, ignoring the vast caste gap between them. The affair is caught by the feudal lord, and he murders Kochuraman. His chopped-off body is displayed for all the village to see while Manorama Thampuratti is paralysed after getting kicked by the Thampuran during the incident. Kochuvava witnesses his father's body lying in the pool of blood under a coconut tree and despite his young age, he swears revenge upon his father's murderers.

Kochuvava grows up into a ruthless abkari amassing wealth through various legal and illegal ways, climbing the social ladder with the changing times. He ends up buying everything in the village including the kovilakam, whose current generation sold the land as they migrated to an urban life.

For Kochuvava, nothing is more important than money and revenge in his life. Even his wife and son are secondary when it comes to that. In his quest for revenge, he bullies anyone and anything who dares to stand up to him. Despite being uneducated during changes around him, he manages his empire with his wit and ruthless efficiency. He plans to exact his ultimate vengeance by starting an illicit Arrack business in the kovilakam. This will serve to increase his profits as well as help drive out the last residents of the kovilakam - Manorama and a young girl who live there with their property overseer Raman Nair. Following this, he plans to dig a pond where the kovilalkam stands today. For Kochuvava, drinking a handful of water from that pond will mark the completion of his vengeance.

However, this masterful long-standing plan is strongly resented by his spoilt immature son, Mohan, who also happens to be in love with the young and equally naive girl who is the titular "Kochuthampuratti" of the kovilakam. Kochuvava mostly resents this relationship, accusing the aristocratic girl to be scheming to win all his wealth and offspring while Kochuvava was trying to win her house in exchange for money. One day, both lovers (neither of them has a job or independent source of income or knows any way of life other than living off the assets of their parents) decide to live together and come and stay with Kochuvava. He initially refuses to let them stay here and threatens to make life impossible for them even if they are to go live in the old ruined palace.

As Kochuvava thinks things over in the mediation of other friends and well-wishers, the immature couple go and immediately hang themselves in the palace. Raman Nair, the overseer of the feudal family sees the hanging bodies. Kochuvava's words echo in his mind about the inevitability of his plan to start Arrack manufacturing in the upper caste homestead. He realizes the strength of Kochuvava's will upon seeing his own son and the young aristocrat dead as well. Unable to stand the caste humiliation any longer, he burns down the palace with Manorama alive inside it and goes and informs Kochuvava and the rest of the village.

The film ends in a bitter tragedy for Kochuvava as he finally bowed his head for the first time in his life to love and fire. It is unclear what punishment was given to Raman Nair or whether this made any change in Kochuvava's plans to dig a pond where the palace once stood.

== Cast ==
The role of Kochuvava was challenging. Kattu Kuthira, the film, was virtually the play by S. L. Puram; there was hardly any change. But I had to make my role cinematic, not theatrical. I was aware that it was a role made memorable by Rajan P. Dev on stage, so there was bound to be comparison. I had to leave my own impression on the role, and there was the slang of the character that I had to get right."

— Thilakan about his role in the film.

According to the opening credits of the film:

- Thilakan as Kochuvava
- Vineeth as Mohan
- Anju as Latha
- Kaviyoor Ponnamma as Manka
- Innocent as Balakrishna Menon
- K. P. A. C. Lalitha as Kalyani
- Babu Namboothiri as Raman Nair
- Kuthiravattom Pappu as Mammukka
- V. K. Sreeraman as Kochuraman
- Sandhya as Manorama Thampuratti
- Jagannatha Varma as Valiya Thampuran
- Praseetha

== Reception ==
The film was a commercial success. Thilakan's role as Kochuvava is regarded as one of the best in his career. P. K. Ajith Kumar of The Hindu termed it as his "best." It is also regarded as P. G. Vishwambaran's best work.
