= Satyavan Savithri =

- Theatrical release poster
- Directed by: P. G. Viswambaran
- Written by: S. L. Puram Sadanandan
- Based on: Savitri and Satyavan
- Produced by: R. Devarajan
- Starring: Kamal Haasan; Sridevi; Adoor Bhasi; Thikkurisi Sukumaran Nair; Sreelatha Namboothiri
- Cinematography: U. Rajagopal
- Edited by: V.P. Krishnan
- Music by: G. Devarajan
- Production company: Sreevardhini Productions
- Distributed by: Haseena Films Release
- Release date: 14 October 1977
- Running time: 177 minutes
- Country: India
- Language: Malayalam

Satyavan Savithri is a 1977 Indian Malayalam-language period drama film directed by P. G. Viswambaran, starring Kamal Haasan and Sridevi. The film was also dubbed into Tamil with the same title and into Telugu as Sathyavanthudu.

== Plot ==
Satyavan Savithri is based on the story of the Mahabharata character Savitri, a woman whose devotion matched Draupadi's as said by Markandeya to Yudhishthira's query.

== Cast ==
- Kamal Haasan as Satyavan
- Sridevi as Savitri
- Adoor Bhasi
- Thikkurissy Sukumaran Nair
- Jose Prakash as Ashwapathi
- Kaviyoor Ponnamma as Arundathi Devi
- Sankaradi as Rajaguru
- Sreelatha Namboothiri
- Pattom Sadan
- P. K. Abraham
- Manavalan Joseph
- T. P. Madhavan
- Kaduvakkulam Antony
- Aranmula Ponnamma
- Baby Sumathi

== Songs ==
Satyavan Savithri

Soundtrack album by G. Devarajan
- Genre: Feature film soundtrack
- Length: 31:15
- Label: EMI

The music was composed by G. Devarajan. Lyrics were written by Sreekumaran Thampi.

No.	Song	Singers	Lyrics
1	"Neelambujangal..."	K. J. Yesudas	Sreekumaran Thampi
2	"Thiruvilayadalil..."	P. Madhuri	Sreekumaran Thampi
3	"Aashadam..."	K. J. Yesudas	Sreekumaran Thampi
4	"Kalyanappattu"	P. Madhuri & Chorus	Sreekumaran Thampi
5	"Raagasaagaram"	K. J. Yesudas	Sreekumaran Thampi
6	"Kasthoori Mallika"	P. Jayachandran, P. Madhuri	Sreekumaran Thampi
7	"Poonjola Kadavil"	K. P. Brahmanandan, C. O. Anto, P. Madhuri	Sreekumaran Thampi

== Release ==
Satyavan Savithri was released on 14 October 1977, and the final length of the film was 3,998.34 metres (13,117.9 ft).
