= Raagam Thaanam Pallavi =

- Directed by: A. T. Abu
- Written by: A. T. Abu; S. L. Puram Sadanandan (dialogues)
- Screenplay by: S. L. Puram Sadanandan
- Starring: Srividya; Sankaradi; Janardanan; Kuthiravattam Pappu
- Cinematography: C. Ramachandra Menon
- Edited by: M. S. Mani
- Music by: M. K. Arjunan
- Production company: Amrutha Movies
- Distributed by: Amrutha Movies
- Release date: 31 October 1980
- Country: India
- Language: Malayalam

Raagam Thaanam Pallavi is a 1980 Indian Malayalam-language film, directed by A. T. Abu. The film stars Srividya, Sankaradi, Janardanan and Kuthiravattam Pappu in the lead roles. The film has musical score by M. K. Arjunan.

== Cast ==
- Srividya as Nandinikutty
- Sankaradi as Jayachandran's father
- Kuthiravattam Pappu as Gopalankutty
- M. G. Soman as Jayachandran
- Meena as Jayachandran's mother
- Kottarakkara Sreedharan Nair as Marar
- Sreenivasan as Appukuttan
- Ravi Menon as Venu
- Jalaja as Jaanu
- Geetha (old) as Cicily

== Soundtrack ==
The music was composed by M. K. Arjunan and the lyrics were written by A. P. Gopalan.

No.	Song	Singers	Lyrics	Length (m:ss)
1	"Athapoo Chithirapoo"	Chorus, Jency	A. P. Gopalan	
2	"Kannundenkilum"	K. J. Yesudas	A. P. Gopalan	
3	"Nukaraatha Poovo"	K. J. Yesudas, Vani Jairam	A. P. Gopalan	
4	"Paarvathy Swayamvaram"	K. J. Yesudas	A. P. Gopalan	
