= Ravi Menon =

Indian actor

- Born: 1950; Palakkad, Kerala, India
- Died: 24 November 2007 (aged 56–57); Perinthalmanna, Kerala, India
- Years active: 1973–2006

Chalappurathu Raveendranatha Menon (1950 – 24 November 2007), popularly known as Ravi Menon, was a veteran Indian film actor who worked in Malayalam cinema. He was born in Sreekrishnapuram, Palakkad in 1950. He graduated from the Film and Television Institute of India in Pune and made his debut in the Malayalam movie Nirmalyam, for which he received the state government special jury award. He was nominated for Best Actor for his role in Mani Kaul's Duvidha. His notable movies includes Shalini Ente Koottukari, Shyama, Kilukkam, and Minnaram. He acted in more than 50 Malayalam movies.

He died in Perinthalmanna, Kerala in November 2007 at age 57 from cancer. He never married.

== Filmography ==
Year	Title	Role	Notes
1973	Duvidha	Krishnalal	
1973	Nirmalyam	Brahmadathan Namboothiri	
1974	Udayam Kizhakku Thanne		
1975	Thomasleeha		
1975	Ullasayathra		
1975	Niramaala		
1975	Boy Friend		
1975	Velicham Akale		
1976	Chottanikkara Amma		
1976	Yudhabhoomi		
1977	Choondakkari		
1977	Niraparayum Nilavilakkum		
1978	Ekakini		
1978	Uthrada Rathri		
1978	Randilonnu	Rajan	
1978	Thanal		
1978	Manoradham		
1978	Sathrathil Oru Rathri		
1978	Bhrashtu		
1978	Ashwathmma		
1979	Pathinalaam Raavu	Moidu	
1979	Iniyathra		
1979	Vadaka Veedu		
1979	Pathivrutha		
1979	Radha Enna Pennkutti		
1979	Raathrikal Ninakku Vendi		
1979	Ente Neelakasham	Chandran	
1979	Thenthulli		
1980	Soorya Daaham		
1980	Shalini Ente Koottukari	Roy	
1980	Raagam Thaanam Pallavi	Venu	
1980	Karimpana	Nesamani	
1981	Vida Parayum Munpe	Manoharan	
1981	Pinneyum Pookkunna Kaadu		
1981	Sambhavam		
1981	Aarathi	Ravi	
1981	Greeshmam		
1981	Orikkal Koodi	Vasavan	
1982	Kanmanikkorumma (Ushnabhoomi)		
1982	Sahyante Makan		
1982	Komaram		
1983	Ashtapadi		
1983	Sandhya Vandanam	Mammathu	
1983	Swapname Ninakku Nandi	Mammukka/Appu	
1983	Ahankaram	Gopi	
1983	Varanmaare Aavashyamundu	Ravikumar	
1983	Nizhal Moodiya Nirangal	Boban	
1984	Krishna Guruvayoorappa	Srikrishnan	
1984	Swantham Sarika	Raveendran Nair	
1984	Nishedi	Ravi	
1984	Oru Kochu Swapnam	Damu	
1985	Chorakku Chora	Paulose	
1986	Swamy Sreenarayana Guru		
1986	Thalavattam		
1987	Naradhan Keralathil	Lord Siva	
1987	Cheppu		
1987	Swargam		
1988	Agnichirakulla Thumbi		
1988	Bheekaran		
1989	Aval Oru Sindhu		
1989	Antharjanam	Priest	
1990	Sthreekku Vendi Sthree		
1990	Indrajaalam	Photographer Ravi	
1991	Bhoomika	CI Chacko	
1991	Raid		
1994	Parinayam	Krishnan	
1994	Minnaram	Priest	
1995	Oru Abhibhashakante Case Diary	Mathukutty	
1995	Maanthrikam	Fr. Thaliyath	
1998	Magician Mahendralal from Delhi	Vareed	
1999	Crime File	Priest	
2000	Varnakkazhchakal	Shankarankutty	
2001	Vezhambal		
2002	Onnaman	Gopalan Mesthiri	
2002	Swapna Halliyil Orunaal		
2003	Shingari Bolona	Bank Manager Stephen	
2004	Parinamam		
2004	Ee Snehatheerathu	Krishnamoorthy	
2006	Pathaka	Kelappan Nair	
