= Randilonnu =

- Directed by: A. S. Prakasam
- Starring: Sukumaran; Ravi Menon; Ushakumari; Jayageetha
- Cinematography: Kanniyappan
- Edited by: Prasad Rao
- Music by: M. S. Viswanathan
- Production company: United Enterprises
- Distributed by: United Enterprises
- Release date: 9 March 1978
- Country: India
- Language: Malayalam

Randilonnu is a 1978 Indian Malayalam film, directed by A. S. Prakasam. The film stars Sukumaran, Ravi Menon, Ushakumari and Jayageetha in the lead roles. The film has musical score by M. S. Viswanathan.

== Cast ==
- Sukumaran
- Ravi Menon
- Ushakumari
- Jayageetha
- Chandralekha
- Sadhana
- Kaviyoor Ponnamma
- KPAC Lalitha
- Prathapachandran
- Kunchan
- Sankaradi
- Master Sunil
- Master Rajan

== Soundtrack ==
The music was composed by M. S. Viswanathan and the lyrics were written by Mankombu Gopalakrishnan.

No.	Song	Singers	Lyrics	Length (m:ss)
1	"Karanam Thettiyal"	Jolly Abraham	Mankombu Gopalakrishnan	
2	"Love Me Like"	P. Jayachandran, L. R. Anjali	Mankombu Gopalakrishnan	
3	"Panchavankaattile"	S. Janaki, M. S. Viswanathan	Mankombu Gopalakrishnan	
4	"Panchavankaattile" (Fast)	S Janaki, M. S. Viswanathan	Mankombu Gopalakrishnan	
5	"Thaarake Rajatha Thaarake"	Vani Jairam	Mankombu Gopalakrishnan	
