= Iniyathra =

- Directed by: Srini
- Written by: Dr. Sivasankar
- Starring: Srividya; Ravi Menon; Kuthiravattam Pappu; Nanditha Bose
- Music by: Shyam
- Production company: Jayakrishna Movies
- Distributed by: Jayakrishna Movies
- Release date: 26 October 1979
- Country: India
- Language: Malayalam

Iniyathra is a 1979 Indian Malayalam film, directed by Srini. The film stars Srividya, Ravi Menon, Kuthiravattam Pappu and Nanditha Bose in the lead roles. The film has musical score by Shyam.

== Cast ==
- Srividya
- Ravi Menon
- Janardanan
- Kuthiravattam Pappu
- Nanditha Bose
- Prathapan
- Urmila

== Soundtrack ==
The music was composed by Shyam and the lyrics were written by Poovachal Khader.

No.	Song	Singers	Lyrics	Length (m:ss)
1	"Aalinganathin Sukhamaanu Nee"	Chorus, Jolly Abraham	Poovachal Khader	
2	"Eeranudukkum Yuvathi"	Vani Jairam, Karthikeyan	Poovachal Khader	
3	"Kaanaathe Nee Vannu"	S. Janaki	Poovachal Khader	
4	"Karayaan Polum Kazhiyaathe"	S. Janaki	Poovachal Khader	
