= A. T. Abu =

Indian film director

A. T. Abu is a Malayalam director perhaps known best for directing the film Dhwani. He has directed eight Malayalam films to date, two of which were unreleased.

== Filmography ==
Year	Title	Cast
1975	Sthreedhanam (U)	
1980	Raagam Thaanam Pallavi	Srividya, Sankaradi, Kuthiravattam Pappu, M. G. Soman
1981	Thaalam Manasinte Thaalam	Prem Nazir, Sheela, Jagathy Sreekumar
1985	Manya Mahajanangale	Mammootty, Chitra, Prem Nazir, Adoor Bhasi, Seema
1986	Atham Chithira Chothy	Mukesh, Nedumudi Venu, Nadiya Moithu, Innocent
1988	Dhwani	Prem Nazir, Jayabharathi, Jayaram, Shobana, Suresh Gopi
1990	Ananthanum Appukkuttanum Aanayundu (U)	Sai Kumar, Innocent, Mamukkoya
1992	Ente Ponnu Thampuran	Suresh Gopi, Urvashi, Rizabawa
