= Varkeys =

Indian supermarket chain

Varkeys Supermarket
- Company type: Subsidiary
- Industry: Retailing
- Founded: 1984
- Products: Supermarket; Hypermarket
- Brands: Varkeys

Varkeys was a supermarket chain based in Kerala, India which is now defunct. It had outlets in Cochin, Trichur, Calicut, and Trivandrum. It also owned and operated a hypermarket chain known as V Mart.

Other than just retailing it also had a bakery in every store it operated, selling traditional Kerala and Indian snacks which include pastries such as puffs, and samosas.
