= Reality Show =

Reality show is a term for a television series in the reality television genre.

Reality Show may also refer to:

- Reality Show (film), a 2004 documentary film directed by Colin Trevorrow
- Reality Show (album), a 2015 album by Jazmine Sullivan
- Reality Show?, a 2015 album by Taiwanese singer Show Luo
- "Reality Show", a song by T-Pain from the 2008 album Three Ringz
- Reality Show, a 2012 Showtime mockumentary series created by and starring Adam Rifkin, later adapted into the film Shooting the Warwicks
