= Aravindan =

Aravindan is both a surname and a given name. Notable people with the name include:

- G. Aravindan (1935–1991), Indian film director, screenwriter, musician, cartoonist, and painter
- Aravindan Neelakandan (born 1971), Indian writer
- Mala Aravindan (1939–2015), Malayalam film actor
