= P. G. Viswambharan =

Indian film director

- Born: Plamthottam Gangadharan Viswambharan; 1947; Thiruvananthapuram
- Died: 16 June 2010; Kochi
- Occupation: film director
- Years active: 1963–2002
- Spouse: Meena
- Children: Vimi, Vinod
- Parent(s): Karichchal Plamthottam Gangadhara Panicker, Ponni Amma

Plamthottathil Gangadharan Viswambharan (1947 – 16 June 2010) was an Indian film director who worked in Malayalam cinema. Viswambharan directed 63 Malayalam films, in a career spanning close to four decades.

== Career ==
For a decade, P. G. Viswambharan worked under veteran Sasikumar before becoming a full-fledged director in 1976 with Ozhukkinethire. He is among the most prolific directors in Malayalam cinema, having independently directed 63 movies. He was the director of Mammootty's first action political entertainer movie Sphotanam which was vital in the career of Mammootty in making a space in Malayalam film industry, Satyavan Savithri starring Kamal Haasan and Sridevi, Sandhyakku Virinja Poovu, Ee Sabdam Innathe Sabdam, Kattukuthira, Gajakesari Yogam, Carnival, Ezhupunna Tharakan, were some of his notable movies. The 2002 movie Puthooram puthri Unniyarcha was his last. Many of his movies have been dubbed to Tamil, Telugu and Kannada. He has also been elected as the vice-chairman of MACTA ( Malayalam cine technicians association ) for a period of five years. Viswambharan is one of the few directors in Malayalam to cross the mark of 50 independent movies with 63 movies to his credit. He has worked with all the major actors and technicians of the industry and has worked with Mammootty in 23 of his films. Kamal Haasan, Amjad Khan & Sridevi are a few of the other notable personalities he has cast successfully in his movies. He was specially mentioned by BBC India for his contributions to Malayalam cinema. He has won several awards including the prestigious film critics award.

== Personal life ==
Viswambharan was born in 1947 to Karichchal Plamthottam Gangadhara Panicker and Ponni Amma. He died on 16 June 2010 at P.V.S. Hospital in Kochi.

== Filmography ==
Year	Title	Notes
1976	Ozhukkinethire	
1976	Neeyente Lahari	
1977	Satyavan Savithri	
1978	Seemanthini	
1978	Pockettadikkari	
1978	Puthariyankam	
1978	Madhurikkunna Rathri	
1978	Avar Jeevikkunnu	
1979	Ivide Kattinu Sugandam	
1979	Itha Oru Theeram	
1980	Kadalkkaattu	
1980	Chaakara	
1981	Greeshma Jwala	
1981	Enne Snehikku Enne Mathrakm	
1981	Sphodanam	
1981	Sangharsham	
1981	Kadathu	
1981	Idiyum Minnalum	
1982	Oru Thira Pinneyum Thira	
1982	Ithu Njangalude Katha	
1983	Sandhyakku Virinja Poovu	
1983	Sagaram Santham	
1983	Rugma	
1983	Pin Nilavu	
1983	Onnu Chirikku	
1983	Himavahini	
1984	Veendum Chalikkunna Chakram	
1984	Thirakil Alppam Samayam	
1984	Sandhyakenthinu Sindooram	
1984	Oru Kochukatha Aarum Parayatha Katha	
1984	Onnanu Nammal	
1985	Ivide Ee Theerathu	
1985	Ee Thanalil Ithiri Neram	
1985	Ee Sabdam Innathe Sabdam	
1985	Ee Lokam Ivide Kure Manushyar	
1986	Ithile Iniyum Varu	
1986	Prathyekam Sradhikuka	
1986	Nandi Veendum Varika	
1986	Aval Kathirunnu Avanum	
1987	Ponnu	
1987	Itha Samayamayi	
1988	Simon Peter Ninakku Vendi	
1988	Oru Vivaada Vishayam	
1989	Carnival	
1990	Kattukuthira	
1990	Gajakesariyogam	
1991	Irikku M.D. Akathundu	
1991	Ennathe Programme	
1992	First Bell	
1993	Vakkeel Vasudev	
1993	Pravachakan	
1993	Aagneyam	
1994	Dhadha	
1995	Parvathy Parinayam	
1997	Suvarna Simhaasanam	
1998	Glorya Fernandes from USA	
1999	Ezhupunna Tharakan	
2002	Puthooramputhri Unniyarcha	
