= Sphodanam =

- Poster
- Directed by: P. G. Viswambharan
- Written by: Alleppey Sheriff
- Produced by: Babu; K. J. Thomas
- Starring: Sukumaran; M. G. Soman; Mammootty; Ravikumar; Seema; Balan K. Nair; K. P. Ummer; Kuthiravattam Pappu; Sankaradi; Mala Aravindan; Jagathi Sreekumar
- Cinematography: U. Rajagopal
- Edited by: K. Narayanan
- Music by: Shankar–Ganesh
- Distributed by: Vijaya Movies
- Release date: 9 April 1981
- Country: India
- Language: Malayalam

Sphodanam (transl. Explosion) is a 1981 Indian Malayalam-language film directed by P. G. Viswambharan, starring Sukumaran, M. G. Soman, Mammootty, Ravikumar and Seema. The role of Sukumaran was initially intended for Jayan. However, he died before production began.

== Plot ==
Sphodanam is the story of two people who have to fight for justice against the landlord as they are the voice of the working class.

== Cast ==
- Sukumaran as Gopi
- M. G. Soman as Surendran
- Mammootty (credited as Sajin) as Thankappan
- Ravikumar as Engineer
- Seema as Lalitha
- Sheela as Devaki
- Balan K. Nair as Muthalali
- K. P. Ummer as Police Officer
- Prameela as Narayanapilla's wife
- Kuthiravattam Pappu as Narayana Pilla
- Sankaradi as Krishnan
- Santhakumari as Muthalali's wife
- Shubha as Gouri
- Mala Aravindan as Vasu Pilla
- Jagathi Sreekumar as Kuttan Pilla
- Kaviyoor Ponnamma as Gopi's mother
- Santo Krishnan as Kunjappi
- KPAC Premachandran as Sankaran
- Preman

== Production ==
Sphodanam was one of the earliest films of actor Mammootty, before he being turned a major star. In a late interview to a film weekly, actress Sheela, who played the lead lady in Sphodanam and was also the producer of the film, recalled the events during the shoot. A scene wherein actors Sukumaran, and Mammootty jumping across a prison wall was shot with a foam bed lying upon the ground on which the actors would fall. Mammootty, who was just a newbie actor at the time, was refused to have the privilege of a bed as a protection by the director P. G. Vishwambharan. Vishwambharan said a new face like Mammootty doesn't deserve such privileges, though Sheela argued with him against such a discrimination. Mammootty, however, jumped from the wall without the safety bed and suffered an injury to his leg. The actor completed his remaining parts and many other films with the fractured leg.This injury might be the reason for the gait we associate with the actor today. Mammootty is credited as 'Sajin (Mammootty)' in the movie, as the director felt this was preferable.

== Soundtrack ==
The music was composed by Shankar–Ganesh and the lyrics were written by O. N. V. Kurup.

Song	Singers
"Kaarkuzhalil Poovu Choodiya"	K. J. Yesudas
"Maari Maari Poomaari"	S. Janaki, Chorus
"Nashtappeduvaanillonnum"	K. J. Yesudas, Chorus
"Valakilukkam Kelkkanallo"	P. Jayachandran, Vani Jairam, B. Vasantha, Jolly Abraham
