= Manjeri Chandran =

- Born: M. K. Ramachandran; Manjeri, Malappuram district, Kerala, India
- Citizenship: India
- Occupations: Film actor, producer
- Years active: 1970 – 2004
- Spouse: Sathyabhama
- Children: Rani Sarran

Manjeri Chandran (born M. K. Ramachandran) was a notable Indian actor and producer in the Malayalam film industry. He was primarily active during the 1970s and early 1980s and appeared in around 100 films, mostly in supporting or character roles, with occasional lead appearances.

== Early life ==
Chandran was born in Oorakam, Vengara in Malappuram district, Kerala. He began his film career at a time when very few from the Malabar region entered cinema. He later moved to Madras—then the hub of South Indian cinema—and eventually returned to Manjeri in the 1980s. During his active career, he married Sathyabhama, a bank employee. Their daughter, Rani Sarran, is active in the South Indian film Industry and television Industry. Rani Sarran is married to Malayalam actor Sharran Puthumana.

== Film career ==
Chandran began his career during a golden era of Malayalam cinema. He debuted in the 1970 film Aa Chitrashalabham Parannotte. From minor roles, he quickly progressed to more prominent parts. His performances in mythological and socially relevant films brought acclaim. He later ventured into film production, contributing to several commercially successful Malayalam movies.

== Selected filmography ==
Chandran appeared in approximately 100 films across various languages.

Selected filmography
No.	Film	Role	Director	Year
1	Aa Chitrashalabham Parannotte	–	–	1970
2	C.I.D. Nazir	Officer	P. Venu	1971
3	Gangasangamam	–	J. D. Thottan, B. K. Pottekkad	1971
4	Vivaha Sammanam	–	J. D. Thottan	1971
5	Ananthashayanam	–	K. Sukumaran	1972
6	Azhimukham	–	P. Vijayan	1972
7	Taxi Car	–	P. Venu	1972
8	Sambhami Yuge Yuge	–	K. G. George	1972
9	Football Champion	–	A. B. Raj	1973
10	Police Ariyaruthu	–	M. S. Senthilkumar	1973
11	Bhadradeepam	–	M. Krishnan Nair	1973
12	Ladies Hostel	–	Hariharan	1973
13	Agnathavasam	Manager	A. B. Raj	1973
14	Nakshatram	–	A. Vincent	1973
15	Bhoomi Devi Pushpiniyayi	–	T. Hariharan	1974
16	Ayalathe Sundari	–	Hariharan	1974
17	Honeymoon	–	Hariharan	1974
18	Malsaram	–	K. Narayanan	1975
19	Chief Guest	Chandran	A. B. Raj	1975
20	Palaazhi Mathanam	–	Sasikumar	1975
21	Appooppan	Venugopal	P. Bhaskaran	1976
22	Rathriyile Yathrakkaar	–	P. Venu	1976
23	Light House	–	A. B. Raj	1976
24	Mohiniyattam	–	Sreekumaran Thampi	1976
25	Panchami	–	Hariharan	1976
26	Harshabhaspam	Sreedharan	P. Gopikumar	1977
27	Jagadguru Adishankaran	Lord Shiva	P. Bhaskaran	1977
28	Madhuraswapnam	–	M. Krishnan Nair	1977
29	Panchamrutham	–	J. Sasikumar	1977
30	Sakhakaley Munnotte	–	J. Sasikumar	1977
31	Tholkkan Enikku Manassilla	–	Hariharan	1977
32	Samudram	–	K. G. George	1977
33	Ashtamangalyam	–	P. Gopikumar	1977
34	Mudra Mothiram	–	J. Sasikumar	1977
35	Sathyavan Savithri	–	P. Bhaskaran	1977
36	Asthamayam	Chandran	P. Chandrakumar	1978
37	Jayikkaanaayi Janichavan	–	J. Sasikumar	1978
38	Avalkk Maranamilla	–	Melattoor Ravi Varma	1978
39	Itha Oru Manushyan	–	I. V. Sasi	1978
40	Aalamarattam	–	P. Venu	1978
41	Prarthana	–	A. B. Raj	1978
42	Aaru Manikkooru	–	Devaraj, Mohan	1978
43	Snehathinte Mukhaprasam	Friend of Devadas	T. Hariharan	1978
44	Black Belt	–	Crossbelt Mani	1978
45	Pichathi Kuttappan	–	P. Venu	1979
46	Avalude Pratikaram	–	P. Venu	1979
47	Agniparvatham	–	P. Chandrakumar	1979
48	Ward Number Seven	–	P. Venu	1979
49	Kalliyankattu Neeli	–	M. Krishnan Nair	1979
50	Pennorumbettāl	–	P. K. Joseph	1979
51	Anthapuram	–	K. J. Rajasekharan	1980
52	VELIYETTAM	Inspector	P. T. Rajan	1981
53	Guha	Attacker of Das	M. R. Jose	1981
54	Agnisharam	Inspector	A. B. Raj	1981
55	Shantham Bhikharam	–	M. Hariharan	1981
56	Tharattu	–	Balachandramenon	1981
57	Belt Mathai	Velayudhan	T. S. Mohan	1983
58	Vashi	–	M. R. Jose	1983
59	Karimb	–	K. Vijayan, Ramu Karyatt, Manuel Romero	1984
60	Anthichuvappu	–	Kurian Varnashala	1984
61	Akkare Ninnoru Pennu	–	T. Hariharan	1984
62	Onnum Onnum Pathinonnu	–	Ravi Gupta	1988
63	Kannamma (Tamil)	–	Shivachandran	1988
64	Poonilavu	–	Tejas Perumannlan	1997
65	Magician Mahendralal from Delhi	–	K. Radhakrishnan	1998
66	Aayiram Meni	Guest appearance	I. V. Sasi	1999
67	Ee Snehatheerathu (Samam)	–	Shivaprasad	2004
68	Nayanam	–	Sunil Madhav	2009
69	Fast Passenger	–	–	Unreleased
70	Suspense	–	–	Unreleased
71	Swaraksharangal	–	–	Unreleased

== Later life and death ==
Manjeri Chandran died on 14 April 2009.
