= Venal (film) =

- Directed by: Lenin Rajendran
- Written by: K. N. Ansari (ROHINI); Lenin Rajendran (dialogues)
- Screenplay by: Lenin Rajendran
- Produced by: K. N. Ansari
- Starring: Sukumari; Nedumudi Venu; Sukumaran; Jalaja
- Cinematography: Vipin Das
- Edited by: Ravi
- Music by: M. B. Sreenivasan
- Production company: Salvia Movies (K. N. Ansari)
- Distributed by: Salvia Movies (K. N. Ansari-Kollam)
- Release date: 3 July 1981
- Country: India
- Language: Malayalam

Venal (transl. The scorching summer) is a 1981 Indian Malayalam film, directed by Lenin Rajendran, with story by K. N. Ansari. The film stars Sukumari, Nedumudi Venu, Sukumaran and Jalaja in the lead roles. The film has musical score by MB Sreenivasan. It won the Kerala State Film Award for Best Actress and Filmfare Award for Best Actress – Malayalam for Jalaja

== Cast ==
- Jalaja as Remani ( Voice By Latha Raju)
- Sukumari
- Nedumudi Venu
- Sukumaran
- Meena Menon
- P. K. Abraham

== Soundtrack ==
The music was composed by M. B. Sreenivasan and the lyrics were written by K. Ayyappa Panicker and Kavalam Narayana Panicker.

No.	Song	Singers	Lyrics	Length (m:ss)
1	"Chirakatta Pakshikku" (Nee Thanne Jeevitham Sandhye)	Nedumudi Venu	K. Ayyappa Panicker	
2	"Kaantha Mridula Smera"	S. Janaki	Kavalam Narayana Panicker	
3	"Kaari Kikkiri"	Chorus, C. O. Anto, Usha Ravi	Kavalam Narayana Panicker	
4	"Thaazhika Choodiya"	K. J. Yesudas	Kavalam Narayana Panicker	
