= T. V. Varkey =

Indian writer, professor and literary activist (born 1938)

Thazhakuzhy Varkey Varkey (born 2 April 1938) is an Indian writer, professor and literary activist. He writes novels and short stories both in Malayalam (his native language) and English. He lives in Tripunithura, close to Kochi. Franz Kafka, Albert Camus, Dostoevsky, García Márquez and Günter Grass have influenced his writing.

== Biography ==
T.V. Varkey was born on 2 April 1938 into a middle-class family (Thazhakuzhy), at Mevelloor, in Kottayam district. His father, also named Varkey (1912–1998), was of Kunnathur family and mother, Thressiamma (1916–1978) was of Vembenil family. He had his primary and high school education at Government L.P. S., Velloor, and St. Paul's, Veliyanad (Tripunithura), respectively. He did his degree at Sacred Heart College, Thevara, and Master's at St. Berchman's, Changanacherry, both in language and literature. Varkey, a gold medallist of the University of Kerala for literary debate, published articles, poems and stories in periodicals, and won many prizes in various competitions at an early age.

He joined S. B College as lecturer in 1964. Two years later he had a short stint as a journalist at Deepika, a daily published from Kottayam. Afterwards he worked at Kuriakose Elias College, Mannanam, near Kottayam as a Lecturer and Professor until 1993. During this period he penned his major novels and short stories, besides being a literary activist.

== Important works ==
In his first novel, Vazhiyum Niazhalum (The Road and the shadow), Varkey employed the stream-of-consciousness technique in telling the love story of a widow. Reviewer Dr. Radhakrishnan writes about one of his other novels, Sooryante Maranam (The Death of the Sun), in the Indian Express: "…depicts both Promethean defiance and Sisyphean despair."

Renowned critic Dr. K. M. Tharakan praises Mulmaram (The Thorny Tree), Varkey's next important novel, as the "story of a man, a village and an epoch in the history of Kerala". Chhaya (The Shadow), Varkey's novel, is "the tale of a human being whose inner self is tragically split into pieces like shattered glass, expounding the unique features of abnormal psychology, in particular the multiple personality…", writes senior critic Dr. M. Leelavathy.

Manjupokunna Thalamurakal (The Vanishing Generations) is Varkey's magnum opus. It is a compelling family saga of 125 years, which is integrated with the history of the Syrian Catholic Church of Kerala. The novel Thrikalam (The Three Seasons) is an analysis of modern ideal personality against the backdrop of three sets of people living in different families in the same colony. Death becomes a plaything for a heroic personality here.

Varkey's three scores of short stories have a unique place in Malayalam literature. "Njan Verum Njan" (I'm mere I) received praise as the best story of 1986 and "The Vice-Chancellor" is a story. "Veedum Kozhikoovunnu" (Again the Cock Crows) was the chosen story of 1984, while "Aviswasi" (The Unbeliever) and "Gandhi Sishayan" (Gandhi's Disciple) are noted for their ironical and sarcastic narration.

=== Style and vision ===
Varkey's literary creations are in-depth analyses of his characters, which reflect different shades of his views. His style of writing is personal and sardonic. Most of his writings are serious comedies, although their tone and fictional strategies may "muffle" things.

== Awards ==
- Vipula National Short Story Award – 1988
- Sachethana Award for novel — 1989

Films:

- Sooriyante Maranum. Directed by Rajeev Nath, and won a state award.
- Keli (based on Njan Sivapillai), directed by Bharathan.

== Titles ==
Malayalam

Novels: Vazhiyum Niazhalum (The Road and the Shadow), Vilakku (The Lamp), Sooriyante Maranam (The Death of the Sun), Nam Chithalukal (We’re Termites), Mulmaram (The Thorny Tree), Njan Sivan Pillai (I am Sivan Pillai), Chhaya (The Shadow), Manjupokunna Thalamurakal (The Vanishing Generations), Thrikalam (The Three Seasons)

Short stories: "Aviswasi" (The Unbeliever), "The Vice-Chancellor", "Veedum Kozhikoovunnu" (Again the Cock Crows), "Gandhi Sishayan" (Gandhi's Disciple), "Njan Verum Njan" (I'm mere I)
