= Shuba =

Shuba, Schuba or Shubha may refer to a furcoat (fur clothing) in Russian (шуба), also to:

Given name

- Shubha (actress), an Indian actress
- Shuba Jay (1976–2014), Malaysian entrepreneur, stage performer and actress
- Shubha Phutela (1991–2012), Indian film actress and model
- Shubha Poonja, Indian actress and model
- Shubha Raul (born 1967), mayor of Mumbai, India
- Shubha Tole (born 1967), Indian neuroscientist

Surname

- George Shuba (1924–2014), American baseball player
- Mughira ibn Shu'ba, 7th century companion of Muhammad
- Trixi Schuba (born 1951), Austrian figure skater
