= Vaashi =

- Directed by: M. R. Joseph
- Written by: M. R. Joseph; Velliman Vijayan (dialogues)
- Screenplay by: M. R. Joseph
- Produced by: Manjeri Chandran, Padiyath Ahammed Kutty
- Starring: Nedumudi Venu; Sukumaran; Jalaja; Unnimary
- Cinematography: C. Ramachandra Menon
- Edited by: K. Sankunni
- Music by: Raveendran
- Production company: Three Star Creations
- Distributed by: Three Star Creations
- Release date: 14 October 1983
- Country: India
- Language: Malayalam

Vaashi is a 1983 Indian Malayalam film, directed by M. R. Joseph and produced by Manjeri Chandran and Padiyath Ahammed Kutty. The film stars Nedumudi Venu, Sukumaran, Jalaja and Unnimary in the lead roles. The film has musical score by Raveendran.

== Cast ==
- Baiju as Adv. Satheesh Mulloor
- Anu Mohan as Goutham Ganesh
- Rony David as Jose
- Kottayam Ramesh as Judge
- Sukumaran
- G. Suresh Kumar as Mathew, Abin's father
- Anagha Aarayanan as Anusha Sivakumar
- Sreelakshmi as Madhavi's Mother
- Nandu as Shivakumar
- Maya Menon
- Maya Vishwanath

== Soundtrack ==
The music was composed by Raveendran and the lyrics were written by Mankombu Gopalakrishnan.

No.	Song	Singers	Lyrics	Length (m:ss)
1	"Aaraaro Poomuthe"	Shailaja M. Ashok	Mankombu Gopalakrishnan	
2	"Deepam Thilangi"	P. Jayachandran, Chorus	Mankombu Gopalakrishnan	
