= Pathinalaam Raavu =

- Directed by: Srini
- Written by: M. N. Karassery; Salam Karassery (dialogues)
- Screenplay by: Salam Karassery
- Produced by: Salam Karassery
- Starring: Nilamboor Shaji; Salam Karassery; Kunjava; P. K. Vikraman Nair
- Cinematography: T. V. Kumar
- Edited by: G. Venkittaraman
- Music by: K. Raghavan
- Production company: Navadhara Movie Makers
- Distributed by: Navadhara Movie Makers
- Release date: 16 November 1979
- Country: India
- Language: Malayalam

Pathinalaam Raavu is a 1979 Indian Malayalam-language film, directed by Srini and produced by Salam Karassery. The film stars actor Ravi Menon, Urmila, Nilamboor Shaji, Salam Karassery, Fajar Mangadan (as child artist) Kunjava and P. K. Vikraman Nair. The film has musical score by K. Raghavan.

== Cast ==
- Nilambur Shaji
- Salam Karassery
- Kunjava
- P. K. Vikraman Nair
- Ravi Menon
- Santhakumari
- Urmila
- Eranholi Moosa

== Soundtrack ==
The music was composed by K. Raghavan with lyrics by Poovachal Khader, Kanesh Punoor and P. T. Abdurahiman.

| No. | Song | Singers | Lyrics | Length (m:ss) |
|---|---|---|---|---|
| 1 | "Ahadonte" | Nilamboor Shaji | Poovachal Khader | |
| 2 | "Manavaatti" | Vilayil Valsala, Eranholi Moosa | Poovachal Khader | |
| 3 | "Panineeru" | P. Jayachandran | Kanesh Punoor | |
| 4 | "Panineeru" (Pathos) | P. Jayachandran | Kanesh Punoor | |
| 5 | "Peruthu Monjulloruthi" | K. P. Brahmanandan | P. T. Abdurahiman | |
| 6 | "Samkritha Pamagiri" | | Vazhappully Muhammed | |
