= Chora Chuvanna Chora =

- Directed by: G. Gopalakrishnan
- Starring: Raghavan; Madhu Malini; G. K. Pillai; Jalaja; Kuthiravattam Pappu
- Edited by: G. Murali
- Music by: G. Devarajan
- Production company: Thushara Films
- Distributed by: Thushara Films
- Release date: 8 February 1980
- Country: India
- Language: Malayalam

Chora Chuvanna Chora is a 1980 Indian Malayalam film, directed by G. Gopalakrishnan. The film stars Raghavan, G. K. Pillai, Jalaja and Kuthiravattam Pappu in the lead roles. The film has musical score by G. Devarajan.

== Cast ==
- Madhu Malini as Gouri
- G. K. Pillai
- Jalaja as Sundari
- Kuthiravattam Pappu as Danger
- Santha Devi
- Raghavan (actor) as Pushkaran
- Santhakumari as Kamalakshiyamma
- T. G. Ravi as Kumaran
- KPAC Azeez as Keshavan
- Mala Aravindan as Shiva naanu
- Nellikodu Bhaskaran
- Jagannatha Varma as Gouri's father
- Thrissur Elsy as House owner

== Soundtrack ==
The music was composed by G. Devarajan and the lyrics were written by Mullanezhi and GK Pallath.

No.	Song	Singers	Lyrics	Length (m:ss)
1	"Ithiripoove Chuvannapoove"	P. Madhuri	Mullanezhi	
2	"Manasse Nin Mouna Theeram"	K. J. Yesudas	G. K. Pallath	
3	"Shishirapournami Veenurangi"	Vani Jairam	G. K. Pallath	
4	"Sulalitha Pada Vinyaasam"	K. J. Yesudas	Mullanezhi	
