= Ahangaaram =

- Directed by: D. Sasi
- Produced by: Jose V. Mattam
- Starring: M. G. Soman; Santhakumari; Ravi Menon; Prabhu
- Cinematography: Vijayendra
- Edited by: K. Sankunni
- Music by: Maharaja
- Production company: Shalimar Films
- Distributed by: Shalimar Films
- Release date: 7 June 1983
- Country: India
- Language: Malayalam

Ahangaaram is a 1983 Indian Malayalam-language film, directed by D. Sasi and produced by Jose V. Mattam. The film stars M. G. Soman, Santhakumari, Ravi Menon and Prabhu. The film has musical score by Maharaja.

== Cast ==
- Jayan as Suresh
- M. G. Soman as Vinod
- Santhakumari as Radhika's mother
- Ravi Menon as Gopi
- Prabhu as Balu
- Master Suresh as Bijumon
- Kaduvakulam Antony as Radhika's foster father
- Aranmula Ponnamma as Sreedevi
- Rajalakshmi as Radhika
- Jose Prakash as Rajan
- Thikkurissy Sukumaran Nair as IS Padman
- Jagathy Sreekumar as Nadanam Naanu
- Jayanthy as Rema

== Soundtrack ==
The music was composed by Maharaja and the lyrics were written by Bichu Thirumala.

No.	Song	Singers	Lyrics	Length (m:ss)
1	"Arayaal Thaliril"	Jayamma	Bichu Thirumala	
2	"Arayaalthaliril"	K. J. Yesudas	Bichu Thirumala	
3	"Brahmaasthrangal"	K. J. Yesudas	Bichu Thirumala	
4	"Chilankakale Kadha Parayu"	Vani Jairam	Bichu Thirumala	
