= Thodu Dongalu (1981 film) =

1981 Indian Telugu film by K. Vasu

- Theatrical release poster
- Directed by: K. Vasu
- Written by: Jandhyala
- Produced by: Mahendra
- Starring: Krishna; Chiranjeevi; Madhu Malini; Geetha; Rao Gopal Rao; Kaikala Satyanarayana
- Cinematography: A. Venkat
- Edited by: Nayani Maheswara Rao
- Music by: Satyam
- Production companies: TV International; Vijaya Vauhini Studios; Venus; AVM Studios
- Distributed by: Lakshmi Films (Andhra, Nizam); Lakshmi Dharani Comabines (Ceded); Sri Satyasai Films (Nellore); Radhika Films (Guntur); Usha Pictures (Godavari districts); Swasthik Combines (Karnataka)
- Release date: 12 February 1981
- Country: India
- Language: Telugu

Thodu Dongalu (transl. Joint thieves) is a 1981 Telugu-language film directed by K. Vasu. The film stars Krishna Ghattamaneni, Chiranjeevi, Madhu Malini, Geetha and Rao Gopal Rao in important roles.

== Plot ==
Krishna and Kishore are friends who play tricks on every possible person to make their living. The movie starts with Kishore creating a nuisance in a bar and Krishna bargaining with the bar owner to handle this issue. Later, they plan to make money by creating a fake accident, but Kishore gets attracted towards Jaya, who was driving that car and he forgets his purpose. Krishna meets Rekha and falls in love with her. Rekha works for Rao and Reddy because they've captured her father to find out secrets about a treasure.

Krishna and Kishore repeatedly cheat a person by changing their appearances, but ultimately get caught when they're drunk and go to jail. In jail, they're threatened by another prisoner who claims to be a henchman of Bhoopati. Both heroes revolt against Bhoopati. Bhoopati attacks them, but sees star shaped tattoos on their hands and realises that they're actually his sons and reveals his story to them. Bhoopati is helped by his friend Kantarao, but Kantarao is cheated and killed by Rao and Reddy and Bhoopati is framed under these murder charges. Father and sons decide to teach a lesson to them and release Rekha's father Seetaramayya. Krishna joins Rao's gang using Rekha and Kishore joins Reddy's gang with help of Reddy's daughter Jaya to provoke them against each other. They plan conspiracies against each other, but Rao and Reddy unite and the heroes get caught when they try to kidnap Rao's mentally challenged son and try to release Seetaramayya. After getting caught, they manage to escape and take help from Jaya to use Rao's son to know the whereabouts of Seetaramayya. After a song and fight, they manage to release Seetaramayya and bring him back home, but Kishore is caught by Rao and Reddy's men. Krishna is also trapped and brought to their den, where Bhoopati helps them in the climax fight and ultimately Rao and Reddy are arrested by police and Bhoopati's family re-unites.

== Cast ==
- Krishna as Krishna
- Chiranjeevi as Kishore
- Madhu Malini as Rekha
- Geetha as Jaya
- Rao Gopal Rao as Rao
- Prabhakar Reddy as Reddy
- Nirmalamma
- Jhansi as Meenakshi
- Kaikala Satyanarayana as Bhupathi [guest role]
- Kanta Rao as Krishna Murthy
- Sarathi as Rambabu
- Sakshi Ranga Rao as Namavachakam
- Bheema Raju as Jaggu
- Rambabu
- Suryachandra Rao
- Rallabandi
- Uyyuru Ramakrishna
- Jayamalini as item song
