= Kanmanikkorumma (Ushnabhoomi) =

- Directed by: P.K. Krishnan
- Written by: P.K. Krishnan
- Screenplay by: Sarath Baby
- Produced by: P.K. Krishnan
- Starring: Venu Nagavally, Nedumudi Venu, Ravi Menon, Kuthiravattam Pappu, Balan K Nair, Sreenivasan, Jalaja, Menaka, Santha Kumari
- Cinematography: S. Ayyappan
- Edited by: P. Lakshmanan
- Music by: Shyam
- Release date: 1982
- Country: India
- Language: Malayalam

Kanmanikkorumma (Ushnabhoomi) is a 1982 Indian Malayalam film, produced and directed by P.K. Krishnan. The film stars Venu Nagavally, Nedumudi Venu, Ravi Menon, Jalaja and Menaka in lead roles. The film had musical score by Shyam.

== Crew ==
- Story-Production-Direction: P.K. Krishnan
- Screenplay-Dialogues: Sarath Baby
- Cinematography: S. Ayyappan
- Editing: P. Lakshmanan
- Music: Shyam
- Lyrics: Poovachal Khader
- Singing: K.J. Yesudas, Ambili, Zero Babu, Kousalya
- Art: Surya Sreeni

== Cast ==
- Venu Nagavally
- Nedumudi Venu
- Ravi Menon
- Nellikode Bhaskaran
- Kuthiravattam Pappu
- Balan K Nair
- Sreenivasan
- Jalaja
- Menaka
- Santha Kumari
- A T Ummar
