= Aarathi (film) =

- Directed by: P. Chandrakumar
- Written by: John Paul
- Screenplay by: John Paul
- Produced by: Soorya Narayanan Potti
- Starring: Sukumaran; Mala Aravindan; Ravi Menon; Seema
- Cinematography: Anandakuttan
- Edited by: G. Venkittaraman
- Music by: M. B. Sreenivasan
- Production company: Soorisini Creations
- Distributed by: Soorisini Creations
- Release date: 12 November 1981
- Country: India
- Language: Malayalam

Aarathi (Malayalam: ആരതി) is a 1981 Indian Malayalam drama, and horror film, directed by P. Chandrakumar and produced by Soorya Narayanan Potti. The film stars Seema as the titular character, along with Sukumaran, Mala Aravindan and Ravi Menon in the lead roles. It features a musical score by M. B. Sreenivasan.

== Cast ==
- Seema as Aarathi
- Sukumaran as Saimon
- Mala Aravindan as Damu
- Ravi Menon as Ravi
- Vincent as Vijayan
- Cochin Haneefa as Gangan
- Sankaradi as Balan Menon
- Jose Prakash as Major Prathapa Chandran
- Santhakumari as Nurse

== Soundtrack ==
The music was composed by M. B. Sreenivasan and the lyrics were written by Sathyan Anthikkad.

No.	Song	Singers	Lyrics	Length (m:ss)
1	"Hridaya Vaathaayanangal"	K. J. Yesudas	Sathyan Anthikkad	
2	"Kaumaara Swapnangal"	S. Janaki	Sathyan Anthikkad	
3	"Koumaara Swapnangal" [Dual]	S. Janaki	Sathyan Anthikkad	
