= Thaalam Manasinte Thaalam =

- Directed by: A. T. Abu
- Written by: Prabhakar Puthur
- Screenplay by: Prabhakar Puthur
- Starring: Prem Nazir; Sheela; Jagathy Sreekumar; Thikkurissy Sukumaran Nair
- Cinematography: N. Karthikeyan
- Edited by: A. Sukumaran
- Music by: G. Devarajan
- Production company: Sreelekshmipriya Productions
- Distributed by: Sreelekshmipriya Productions
- Release date: 6 February 1981
- Country: India
- Language: Malayalam

Thaalam Manasinte Thaalam is a 1981 Indian Malayalam-language film, directed by A. T. Abu. The film stars Prem Nazir, Sheela, Jagathy Sreekumar and Thikkurissy Sukumaran Nair. The film has musical score by G. Devarajan.

== Cast ==
- Prem Nazir
- Sheela
- Jagathy Sreekumar
- Thikkurissy Sukumaran Nair
- Baby Ponnambili
- P. A. Aziz
- Jalaja
- Santhakumari
- Sreenath

== Soundtrack ==
The music was composed by G. Devarajan and the lyrics were written by Devadas.

No.	Song	Singers	Lyrics	Length (m:ss)
1	"Aa Amma"	P. Madhuri	Devadas	
2	"Aa Malarvaadiyil Enneyum Nokki"	P. Jayachandran	Devadas	
3	"Thaalam Thettiya Jeevithangal"	M. G. Radhakrishnan	Devadas	
