= Greeshma Jwala =

- Directed by: P. G. Vishwambharan
- Written by: Perumpadavam Sreedharan
- Screenplay by: Perumpadavam Sreedharan
- Starring: Sukumaran; Seema; Ratheesh; Surekha
- Cinematography: C. Ramachandra Menon
- Edited by: G. Murali
- Music by: A. T. Ummer
- Production company: Supreme Production
- Distributed by: Supreme Production
- Release date: 30 January 1981
- Country: India
- Language: Malayalam

Greeshma Jwala is a 1981 Indian Malayalam film, directed by P. G. Vishwambharan. The film stars Sukumaran, Seema, Ratheesh, and Surekha in the lead roles. The film has musical score by A. T. Ummer.

== Cast ==
- Sukumaran as Hari
- Seema as Seetha
- Ratheesh as Kadutha
- Surekha as Valli
- Bahadoor as Unnithan
- P. K. Abraham as Priest
- Achankunju as Kattumooppan
- Kunjandi as Varkey
- Kuthiravattam Pappu as Madman
- T. G. Ravi as Kariyachan
- Renuchandra as Malini
- Mala Aravindan as Nair
- Santhakumari as Gaurikuttyamma
- Thrissur Elsy as Seetha's mother
- Beena Kumbalangi as Chothi

== Soundtrack ==
The music was composed by A. T. Ummer and the lyrics were written by Poovachal Khader.

| No. | Song | Singers | Lyrics | Length (m:ss) |
|---|---|---|---|---|
| 1 | "Paalkkudamenthiya Raavu" | P. Jayachandran | Poovachal Khader | |
| 2 | "Thirunelli Kaadu" | S. Janaki | Poovachal Khader | |
| 3 | "Vithuvithache" | Vani Jairam, Chorus | Poovachal Khader | |
