= Iniyengilum =

- Theatrical release poster
- Directed by: I. V. Sasi
- Written by: T. Damodaran
- Produced by: N. G. John
- Starring: Mammootty; Mohanlal; Ratheesh; Lalu Alex; Ranipadmini; Seema
- Cinematography: Jayanan Vincent
- Edited by: K. Narayanan
- Music by: Shyam
- Production company: Geo Movies
- Release date: 20 August 1983
- Country: India
- Language: Malayalam

Iniyengilum (transl. If only) is a 1983 Indian Malayalam-language social problem film directed by I. V. Sasi, written by T. Damodaran and produced by N. G. John. It stars Mohanlal, Mammootty, Ratheesh, Lalu Alex, Ranipadmini and Seema. The film features music composed by Shyam. The film juxtaposes the economic and cultural conditions of Kerala and Japan.

The film tells the story of a young idealist, Ravi (Mohanlal), who is nauseated by the hypocrisy of his politician brother (Mammootty). To hit back at the prevailing corrupt political system, Ravi stages cultural shows under the banner of the Darshana Kala Kendra, which is a group of unemployed youth. Iniyengilum was a commercial success at the box office.

== Plot ==
Madhavan, Ravi, Ashokan, Alex Matthew, Geetha, Pradeep and Lekha are part of a song and dance troupe that targets the political corruption in Kerala. Ravi returns home to criticism from his brother Diwakaran who is an opposition politician. Alex's father is facing significant difficulty financially as the bank demands repayments and he expresses his disappointment at his son for wasting his life and inheritance on political activism, not being able to assist him with his business troubles. Ashokan's wealthy and miserly father is also unimpressed with his political activities and unemployment, and expresses his disappointment to Ashokan and his mother, while demonstrating his own neuroticism regarding his stashed wealth from dubious sources.

Prasad, a wealthy smuggler, intends to use the troupe for his own purposes to smuggle contraband diamonds and gems to Hong Kong and Japan inside their instruments. Marvin meets Nambiar, who has lived in Japan for 30 years, on the flight to Hong Kong. Upon their arrival, Prasad runs into trouble when he underpays on a deal and has to shoot his way out of it.

The group then head to Japan where they continue their journey. In the meantime, Prasad continues his smuggling with the whole group unaware, until Ravi happens to observe him as he takes the contraband diamonds out of the musical instrument and confronts Prasad. Prasad pulls a gun and threatens them if they involve the police.

Ravi meets Nambiar who explains some of the post-war context of Japan to him. At a Japanese tea ceremony with Nambiar's daughter, Ashokan learns about the Japanese sense of duty and loyalty, which contrasts with the trade unionism and activism in Kerala. These experiences leave a deep impression on both Ravi and Ashokan and they discuss it with the rest of the group.

The Japanese police capture Prasad as part of an Interpol investigation. Nambiar tells them and says they are free to leave Japan. Ashokan, who has fallen in love with Nambiar's daughter, is reluctant to leave but returns.

Back in Kerala, Diwakaran is leading a protest march and gets arrested. Diwakaran criticizes his group for not taking advantage of the situation and creating unrest.

The group return with ideals relating to the dignity of labor. Ravi gets a job as a building laborer, while Pradeep tells his father to train his younger brother in his trade as a carpenter so that he can get a job, instead of being stuck with a useless university degree. Geetha confronts her students on their unruly behavior and points out their lack of discipline. Ravi confronts the foreman, contractor Kariachan, and engineer at his workplace about their mixing of cement that will lead to building issues, creating a work halt. Geetha confronts her colleagues about their work ethic.

The contractor Kariachan, realizing that Ravi is actually Diwakaran's brother, approaches Ravi to give him a bribe to avoid mixing the correct cement ratio; Ravi refuses.

Alex negotiates directly with the workers of his father's factory, bypassing the union leaders to get the factory reopened and prevent bankruptcy. Ashokan informs the revenue authorities about his father's hidden assets from his father's black-market dealings. Ashokan tells his father that it is better to live with less without guilt rather than hide in guilt. The next day, a union leader informs Alex that there will be a total shut down. Alex expresses his disapproval and says that he will keep his factory open and expresses his objection to them writing their political slogans on his factory wall. The union leader threatens Alex, leading to a skirmish.

Later that night, the union leader and his thugs blow up a transformer that feeds electricity into the town and the factory. As a result, Alex and a number of the townspeople beat up the union leader and his thugs. The union leader ends up in hospital with a broken leg. Alex, Ravi, Ashokan, Pradeep and Madhavan are all arrested. The rest of the townspeople protest that they also broke the union leader's leg, leading to the group's release.

Diwakaran heads home to rest after stirring up unrest to further his political interests. The police are instructed to not intervene. When he heads home, he argues with Ravi and tells him that breaking one leader's legs is not going to stop the strike. Diwakaran is informed that rowdies are beating up some of the protesters and that the chaos is getting out of hand with no police intervention. Diwakaran realizes that the government wants to frame him. He meets the minister and demands intervention. The minister says he will do what he can.

The Group of 5 stop one of the leaders from setting a bus on fire. They also criticize the bystanders who do nothing to stop the rowdies and the chaos. The unrest continues as houses are set on fire and the conflict becomes more violent.

The Group of 5 work to prevent damage and rescue innocent bystanders. Due to the unrest, police are injured, killed and hospitalized. Ravi confronts Diwakaran, and Diwakaran confronts the minister in front of the hospital for his inaction. They argue with each other in front of the hospital about who is to blame. The Group of 5 unite the people in protest against the politicians and force them to commit to not causing destruction again.

== Cast ==
- Mohanlal as Ravi
- Mammootty as Diwakaran
- Ratheesh as Ashokan
- Lalu Alex as Alex Mathew
- Ranipadmini as Lekha
- Seema as Geetha
- T. G. Ravi as Madhavan
- Raveendran as Pradeep
- Vincent as Avarachan
- Adoor Bhasi as Mathayi
- Kottayam Santha
- Sankaradi
- Sreenivasan
- Captain Raju as Prasad
- Balan K. Nair as Nambiar
- Sunitha Sharma as Sumire
- C. I. Paul
- Kunjandi

== Production ==
The film was shot in Japan and Hong Kong, and some parts in Kerala.

== Soundtrack ==
The music was composed by Shyam and the lyrics were written by Yusufali Kechery.

Song	Singers
"Kavithe Devi" (Ee Naadu Kadalum Karayum)	P. Jayachandran, Vani Jairam, Chorus
"Kunkuma Sooryan Raagamshu Chaarthi"	K. J. Yesudas, S. Janaki
"Mounam Raagam"	K. J. Yesudas, S. Janaki, Chorus
"Swarga Vaathil Thurannu Thannu"	S. Janaki, P. Jayachandran, Vani Jairam, Unni Menon, J. M. Raju, Kausalya, Krishnachandran

== Release and reception ==
The film was released on 20 August 1983. Writing for India Today, Sreedhar Pillai called it "a badly made film" which "offers nothing new". The film was a commercial success.
