= Naalkavala =

- Directed by: I. V. Sasi
- Written by: T. Damodaran
- Screenplay by: T. Damodaran
- Produced by: K. V. Abraham alias Thomsun Babu
- Starring: Mammootty; Seema; Urvashi; Shobhana; Sreenivasan
- Music by: Shyam
- Production company: Thomsun Films
- Distributed by: Thomsun Films
- Release date: 27 November 1987
- Country: India
- Language: Malayalam

Naalkavala (transl. Cross Roads) is a 1987 Indian Malayalam-language action drama film, directed by I. V. Sasi, written by T. Damodaran and produced by K. V. Abraham, alias Thomsun Babu for Thomsun Films. The film stars Mammootty, Shobhana, Seema, Urvashi, Sreenivasan Captain Raju, T. G. Ravi, Devan and M. G. Soman. The film has musical score by Shyam.

Set in a town-sided village in Kozhikode, where politically connected crime mafia is prevalent, the film features different characters who are linked to each other by different ways.

== Plot ==
Radha, a practicing gynecologist, returns her own house with father, where now a lorry driver Bappu undeservedly dwells. Expelling Bappu from the house, Radha commences a dispensary there. Bappu, an orphan grown up at a Muslim orphanage in Ponnani, is also a small time goon, but has a good heart. Bappu works for Hussain, a local timber baron, and often resides at his friend Saidu's house, whom Bappu helps very much. Bappu arranges a job to Saidu at a petrol pump owned by Hussain. Saidu has a one-sided love to Aami, but she adores Bappu. Kuruppu is a business tycoon and politician and is rival to Hussain. Kuruppu's nephew, Das, is the ex-husband of Radha, who breaks up after she saw Das making love with another lady and was also reluctant to accompany with the exploitive nature of medical business that Das and Kuruppu lead. Robert, a driver turned mafia leader of Kuruppu, unlawfully runs a gambling center concentrating a club, where forced prostitution is also prevalent. Hussain hires Bappu to destroy the arrack-producing shelter of a gang under Robert, for the sake of Samuel, a politician turned abkari business man. Bappu, who has also an old revenge against Robert, beats the gang and fires the house.

After Kuruppu's attempt to reinstate Radha to their hospital was turned down by her, Das assigns Robert for shattering Radha's dispensary. Though it was conducted by Robert's goons, Radha files a complaint against Bappu, misunderstanding that he was the culprit. Bappu comes to Radha's house in a rage as he was falsely accused by her, but is discouraged and scolded by Aami. After knowing that it was Robert behind the attack against Radha, Bappu ambushes him at a theater owned by Kuruppu and is arrested by police. Thereafter, Bappu reconciles with Radha, while Aami opens her love to him. Radha, as a doctor, responsibly advises her patient Leela to oppose the forced prostitution. Bappu arranges Leela's husband, Balan, a job at Hussain's factory, after his wife's forced prostitution was made to stop. Following this, Robert directly attacks Radha's dispensary as she was behind Leela's brave decision, but is fought back by Bappu. Saidu's sister Sainu's marriage is done to Abutty, a driver, working under Hussain who also initiated the proposal. A few weeks after the marriage, Sainu comes back to her house and disinclined to return to her husband's home. She traumatically divulges to Bappu that Hussain raped her after sending Abutty somewhere else for duty and Abutty was also silent to him. She then commits suicide by burning herself. Bappu, in retaliation, stabs to kill Hussain, but was unable to proceed.

The newly transferred police superintendent Rajasekharan tries to coordinate proofs to lock Kuruppu and Das. The casino of Robert is raided and sealed by him, but Robert escapes. Bappu is hired by Kuruppu to kill Rajasekharan, but fails in his attempt. Aami and Bappu's marriage is fixed by Aami's father, but it makes a dislike in Saidu, who is also misled by Hussain, convinced that Bappu had cheated his sister Sainu and that was why she committed suicide. Samuel and Hussain reconciles with Kuruppu. Das and Robert kill Chackochan, a business partner whom they financially owed, and place the body in a car, tricking Bappu into the scene. Bappu is arrested by police and is planned to be killed by inspector Alex during the travel to the court, with deliberate instructions giving to him—to run snapping the gun from police. However, Bappu carries out the act more intelligently, escaping without being shot, and confides before Rajasekharan, who then ensures his safety. Bappu is deceptively brought to a warehouse by Saidu, where Das and his goons attack him but are finally arrested by police led by Rajasekharan. Samuel and Kuruppu are also arrested by him on the basis of Bappu's statement. Seeking Robert and Hussain, they move to the petrol pump and fights with them. Robert and Hussain are beaten and killed, with the pump being exploded.

== Cast ==
- Mammootty as Babu
- Seema as Dr. Radha Menon
- Urvashi as Aami
- Shobhana as Sainu
- Sreenivasan as Saidu
- M. G. Soman as SP Rajasekharan
- Devan as Dr. Devadas
- Captain Raju as Robert
- T. G. Ravi as Hussain Sahib
- Janardhanan as Samuel
- Jagannatha Varma as Ravunni Kurup
- Lizy as Mercy
- Jagathy Sreekumar as Balan
- Kuthiravattam Pappu as Nanu
- Thikkurissy Sukumaran Nair as Menon, Radha's Father
- Balan K. Nair as Hamsa
- Bahadoor as Musliyar, Aami's Father
- Kundara Johny as Sub Inspector Andrews
- Kunchan as Mani, Babu's Friend
- C. I. Paul as Chackochan
- Mamukkoya as H.C Koya
- Augustine as Villager
- Vincent as Raju
- Sabitha Anand as Leela
- Roshni as Sharada
- Santhakumari as Leela
- Lalithasree as Madhavi
- K.P.A.C. Sunny
- Ajith Kollam
- Reji Chandy Mathews
- Kozhikode Sarada

== Trivia ==
- Directors Jomon and M. A. Venu had served as assistant directors in this film.
- Ramesh Sippy visited the film's set, so as to observe the filming process containing large crowd.

== Soundtrack ==
The music was composed by Shyam and the lyrics were written by Yusufali Kechery.

| No. | Song | Singers | Lyrics | Length (m:ss) |
|---|---|---|---|---|
| 1 | "Kinaavu Neyyum" | K. S. Chithra | Yusufali Kechery | |
| 2 | "Muthukkudangale" (Vellinilaavoru) | K. S. Chithra, Chorus, C. O. Anto, Krishnachandran | Yusufali Kechery | |
| 3 | "Vellinilaavoru" | K. S. Chithra | Yusufali Kechery | |

== Box office ==
The film was average.
