= Yeh Desh =

- Theatrical release poster
- Directed by: T. Rama Rao
- Written by: Kamleshwar (dialogues)
- Story by: T. Damodaran
- Based on: Ee Nadu by T. Damodaran
- Produced by: P Mallikharjuna Rao
- Starring: Jeetendra; Kamal Haasan; Zeenat Aman; Geetha; Utpal Dutt
- Cinematography: V. Durgaprasad
- Edited by: Swamy, Balu
- Music by: R. D. Burman
- Production company: Bharati International
- Release date: 24 February 1984
- Running time: 151 minutes
- Country: India
- Language: Hindi

Yeh Desh (transl. This Country) is a 1984 Indian Hindi-language political film, directed by T. Rama Rao and produced by P. Mallikharjuna Rao. It stars Jeetendra, Kamal Haasan, Geetha and Zeenat Aman with music composed by R. D. Burman. The film is a remake of the 1982 Malayalam film Ee Nadu.

== Cast ==
- Jeetendra as Chandra Mohan Azaad
- Zeenat Aman as Sumathi
- Kamal Haasan as Inspector Mathur
- Vinod Mehra as Salim
- Geetha as Pani
- Sachin Pilgaonkar as Shashi
- Amrish Puri as Dhuliya
- Shakti Kapoor as Dharmdas
- Gulshan Grover as Pratap
- Utpal Dutt as Deshbandhu
- Om Shivpuri as Inspector Jagjit Singh
- Satyen Kappu as Rehman
- Aruna Irani as Dancer
- Seema Deo as Azad's sister
- Chandrashekhar as Chief Minister
- Pinchoo Kapoor as Sinha
- Dinesh Hingoo as Reporter
- Yunus Parvez as Bade Babu
- Bhagwan as Harold

== Soundtrack ==
The film's music was composed by R. D. Burman and the lyrics were written by Anand Bakshi. The soundtrack also contains the debut song of Kumar Sanu.

Song	Singer
"Meri Umar Ka Ek Ladka, Mat Poochho Kya Karta Hai"	Kishore Kumar, Asha Bhosle
"Aaj Ki Raat Main"	Asha Bhosle
"Mazdooron Ka Nara Hai"	Mahendra Kapoor
"Yaar Ko Salaam, Pyar Ko Salaam"	Suresh Wadkar, Usha Mangeshkar
"Dekhna Dekhna, Dekhte Dekhte Kuch Ho Jayega, Kisi Ladki Se Aankh Lad Jayegi, Dil Kho Jayega"	Shailendra Singh, Shakti Thakur, Udit Narayan, Kumar Sanu
