= Kozhikode Narayanan Nair =

Indian actor (born 1940)

- Born: 25 May 1940 (age 86); Kozhikode, Kerala, India
- Occupation: Actor
- Years active: 1988–present

Kozhikode Narayanan Nair is an Indian actor who appears in Malayalam films. He has acted in more than 300 films. He was a stage actor before entering Malayalam film industry. His first film was Aabhijathyam (1970), and he is also remembered for his role as Valyamama in Valsalyam (1993).

== Early life ==
Nair was born in 1940 in Panthirankavu in the Kozhikode district, Malabar. He entered his career in early school days through drama playing activities. Later, he became the member of a professional drama troop - Stage India. He continued his drama life with employment in sylon printers. He later became the manager of Marikkar eng. company and Hindustan eng. company.

== Film career ==
In his 50 years of the acting career, he completed 300 films in Malayalam industry. His first film was Aabhijathyam (1970). He then acted in movies such as Utharayanam, Nirmalyam, Kochuthemmadi, Oliyambukal, Bharatham, Aavanazhi, Sadhayam, Ente Sreekuttikku, Perumthachan and Mithunam. He appeared in a noteworthy role in Valsalyam (1993) as Valyamama, next to Mammootty. After Valsalyam (1993), he became an active artist in the Malayalam industry.

== Personal life ==
A strong believer of Sathya Sai Baba, Nair regularly visits Puttaparthi. He resides in Kozhikode. Narayanan is married to Saradha. The couple have two children - one son, Suhas, and one daughter, Suchithra.

== Partial filmography ==
- Ulsavapittennu (1988)
- Kaazhchakkappuram (1992)
- Adhwaytham (1992)
- Sthalathe Pradhana Payyans (1993) as Hakkim Bhai
- Maya Mayuram (1993) as Mestri Madhavan
- Padheyam (1993) as Mangalasseri Govinda Menon
- Samagamam (1993)
- Vatsalyam (1993) as Govindan Nair
- Bhoomi Geetham (1993) as Marar
- Pakshe (1994)
- Sainyam (1994) as Swaminathan
- Moonnaam Loka Pattaalam (1994) as Rajasekharan
- Vaardhakyapuraanam (1994)
- Sopanam (1994)
- Street (1995)
- Saadaram (1995)
- Sindoora Rekha (1995)
- Aksharam (1995)
- Hitler (1996)
- Kaalapani (1996) as Nanu Nair
- Swapnalokathe Bhalabhaskaran (1996)
- Man of the Match (1996)
- Sulthan Hyderali (1996) as Menon
- Devaraagam (1996)
- Mahathma (1996)
- Thoovalkottaram (1996)
- Asuravamsam (1997)
- Five Star Hospital (1997)
- Suvarna Simhaasanam (1997)
- Siamese Irattakal (1997)
- Kilukil Pamparam (1997)
- Mangalya Pallakku (1997) as Sukumaran Nair
- Anubhoothi (1997)
- Kalyaanakkacheri (1997)
- Kannur (1997)
- Ayushmanbhava (1998)
- Chenapparambile Aanakkariyam (1998)
- Daya (1998)
- The Godman (1999)
- Pallavur Devanarayanan (1999) as Sankara Pothuval
- Stalin Sivadas (1999) as Luckose
- Ezhupunna Tharakan (1999) as Paliyekkara Thampuran
- Pattabhishekam (1999)
- F.I.R (1999) as Tahir Sahib
- Rapid Action Force (2000) as Shenoy
- Valliettan (2000) as Arakkal Kuttikrishnan Nair
- Sradha (2000)
- Vinayapoorvam Vidhyaadharan (2000) as Appukuttan Nair
- Naranathu Thampuran (2000) as Kunjiraman Nair
- Aanamuttathe Angalamar (2000) as Balaraman Nair
- Narasimham (2000)
- Ival Draupadi (2000)
- Saivar Thirumeni (2001) as Padmanabhan Nair
- Bharthaavudyogam (2001)
- Uthaman (2001)
- Nariman (2001) as Judge
- Chithrathoonukal (2001)
- Nandanam (2002)
- Mazhathullikkilukkam (2002) as Father Ignatius
- Meesa Madhavan (2002)
- Kilichundan Mampazham (2003) as Musaliar
- Mr. Brahmachari (2003)
- Sahodaran Sahadevan (2003)
- Pravaasam (2004)
- Mampazhakkalam (2004) as Thirumulpaddu
- Bharathchandran I.P.S. (2005)
- Lokanathan IAS (2005)
- The Tiger (2005)
- Lion (2006)
- Thuruppugulan (2006)
- Vargam (2006)
- Pathaka (2006)
- Kaiyoppu (2007) as Kammaran
- Arabikkatha (2007) as Ravunni Mash
- Sooryan (2007)
- Magic Lamp (2008)
- Mohitham (2008)
- Jeevanam (2008)
- Crazy Gopalan (2008) as Judge
- Vilapangalkkappuram (2008)
- Parthan Kanda Paralokam (2008) as Poovanthottathu Chandran
- Madambi (2008)
- Swarnam (2008)
- Cheriya Kallanum Valiya Policum (2009)
- Parayan Maranathu (2009)
- My Big Father (2009)
- Kanmazha Peyyum Munpe (2009)
- Ringtone (2010)
- Avan (2010)
- Khilafath (2010)
- Kaaryasthan (2010)
- Karayilekku Oru Kadal Dooram (2010)
- Annarakkannanum Thannalayahtu (2010)
- Innanu Aa Kalyanam (2011)
- August 15 (2011)
- PSC Balan (2011)
- Shankaranum Mohananum (2011)
- Red Alert (2012)
- Da Thadiya (2012)
- Arike (2012)
- Mullamottum Munthiricharum (2012)
- Gramam (2012) as Panikkar
- Kaanaapaadam (2013)
- Papilio Buddha (2013)
- Mizhi (2013)
- Nadodimannan (2013)
- Vallatha Pahayan (2013)
- 72 Model (2013) as
- Memories as Krishna Pillai
- Drishyam (2013) as Sulaiman
- You Can Do (2013)
- To Noora with Love (2014)
- Ottamandaaram (2014)
- Central Theater (2014)
- Ennu Ninte Moideen (2015)
- Pallikoodam (2016)
- Oppam (2016)
- Villain (2017)
- Madhura Raja (2019)
- Drishyam 2 (2021) as Sulaiman
- Kaalchilambu (2021)
- Marakkar: Lion of the Arabian Sea (2021)
- Thirayozhiyathe (2022)
- 1921: Puzha Muthal Puzha Vare (2023) as Chekutty Sahib
- Ee Bandham Supera (2024)

== Television ==
- Minnukettu (Surya TV)
- Parvanendu
