= John Jaffer Janardhanan =

1982 film by I. V. Sasi

- Poster
- Directed by: I. V. Sasi
- Written by: T. Damodaran
- Starring: Ratheesh; Raveendran; Mammootty; Balan K. Nair; Madhavi
- Cinematography: C. E. Babu
- Edited by: K. Narayanan
- Music by: Shyam
- Release date: 24 September 1982
- Country: India
- Language: Malayalam

John Jaffer Janardhanan is a 1982 Malayalam-language masala film directed by I. V. Sasi, written by T. Damodaran, starring Ratheesh, Ravindran and Mammootty. It is a remake of the 1977 Hindi film Amar Akbar Anthony.

== Plot ==
Three brothers were separated at a young age, after their father abandoned them. The reason was because, their father had taken the blame of the crime committed by his master, Robert. The eldest was raised by a Hindu police officer, The second brother was raised by a Church priest, and the youngest was raised by a Muslim tailor.

Many years later, the eldest son, Janardhan, is now a righteous police officer. The second son, is John and the youngest is Jaffer, a qawwali singer.

Soon, the brothers find themselves falling in love. Janardhan falls for Jenny, a crook. John falls for Nancy in an Easter festival. Jaffer falls for Sophia, the daughter of Kasim.

Finally, the brothers realise their bitter past, and wants to avenge the one who caused them trouble. They come in disguise to Robert's house. They succeed and the movie ends as the brothers unite with their parents and lovers.

== Cast ==
- Mammootty as Janardhanan
- Ratheesh as John Vincent
- Raveendran as Jaffer
- Balan K. Nair as Chandran
- Jose Prakash as Robert
- Kuthiravattam Pappu as Charlie
- Captain Raju as Renji
- K.P.A.C. Sunny as Nanu
- Prathapachandran
- Lalu Alex as Roberts Gunda
- P. K. Abraham as Father
- Nellikode Bhaskaran as Kasim
- K. R. Vijaya as Sumathy
- Sumalatha as Jenny
- Madhavi as Nancy
- Swapna as Sofia
- Surekha as Manju

== Soundtrack ==
The music was composed by Shyam and the lyrics were written by Sreekumaran Thampi.

No.	Song	Singers	Lyrics	Length (m:ss)
1	"John Jaffer Janaardanan"	K. J. Yesudas, P. Jayachandran, Unni Menon, Kalyani Menon	Sreekumaran Thampi	
2	"Mathamethaayaalum"	K. J. Yesudas	Sreekumaran Thampi	
3	"My Name is John"	K. J. Yesudas	Sreekumaran Thampi	
4	"Nirangal Nirayum"	S. Janaki	Sreekumaran Thampi	
5	"Poonthattam Pongumpol"	S. Janaki, Unni Menon	Sreekumaran Thampi	
6	"Vidarnnu Thozhukai"	K. J. Yesudas, P. Susheela, P. Jayachandran, Vani Jayaram, Unni Menon, Kalyani Menon	Sreekumaran Thampi	
