= Kollam G. K. Pillai =

Indian actor

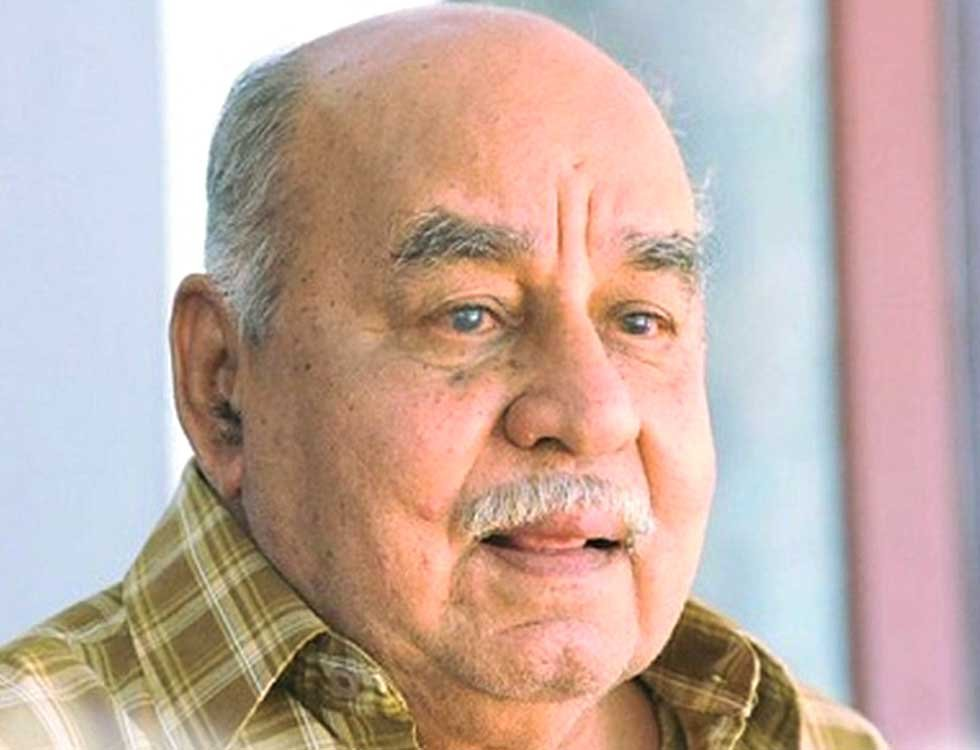
- Born: G Krishna Pilla; 29 August 1934; Kollam, Kerala, India
- Died: 30 January 2016 (Age 82)
- Occupation: actor
- Years active: 1973–2016
- Spouse: Madhavikutty
- Children: 4

Kollam G. K. Pillai was an Indian actor in Malayalam cinema. He acted in more than 50 films. He handled character roles and comedy roles during the 1970s and 1980s. He died on 30 January 2016.

== Career ==
He was a theater artist turned movie actor. He entered into the field of dramas in 1950 through school festivals. He became active in theater with the famous drama Dahajalam in 1962. He has performed many famous plays on more than 4000 stages; these include Dahajalam, Neethipeedam, Rajadoothu, Ayiram Arakkilam, and Accident. Masappady Mathupillai (1973), directed by A. N. Thampi, was his debut movie. He worked as a conductor at Kerala State Road Transport Corporation. He acted in many television serials as well. He was not active in movies for a long time since the loss of his eyesight.

== Personal life ==
He was born to Nair parents Ammachiveedu Radhabhavan K.P. Gopalapillai and Kunjiyamma on 29 August 1934 at Kollam. He was married to Madhavikuttiyamma and the couple had four children, Jayasree, Ushakumari, Vijayasree and Bindusree. He was settled at Sankaramangalam in Chavara, Kollam. He died on 30 January 2016 at his daughter's house Oyoor in Kollam due to age-related ailments. He was 82.

== Partial filmography ==
- Masappady Mathupillai (1973)
- Mucheettukalikkaarante Makal (1975)
- Pushpasharam (1976)
- Seemanthaputhran (1976)
- Mukkuvane Snehicha Bhootham (1978)
- Choola (1979)
- Sayoojyam (1979)
- Lajjavathi (1979)
- Chandrahasam (1980)
- Deepam (1980)
- Vedikkettu (1980)
- Ithikkara Pakki (1980)
- Ivar
- Sooryan (1982)
- Justice Raja as Rajasekharan's father (1983)
- Kurishuyudham as Paappi (1984) as Paappi
- Swanthamevide Bandhamevide (1984)
- Ivide Thudangunnu as PC Pasu Villa (1984)
- Aa Neram Alppa Dooram (1985)
- Ulsavappittennu (1988)
- Nagarangalil Chennu Raparkam (1990) as Karyasthan
- Arabikkadaloram (1995)

== As a singer ==
- Kothikkothi as Pushpasharam (1976)

=== Television serials ===
- Manasaputhri (Asianet)
- Pakida Pakida Pambaram (Doordarshan)
- Nilavilakku (Surya Tv)
- Hallo Kuttichathan (Asianet)
- Autograph (Asianet)

== See also ==
- കൊല്ലം ജി.കെ. പിള്ള in Malayalam Wikipedia
