= Aalkkoottathil Thaniye =

1984 Indian film

- Theatrical release poster
- Directed by: I. V. Sasi
- Written by: M. T. Vasudevan Nair
- Based on: Swargam Thurakkunna Samayam by M. T. Vasudevan Nair
- Produced by: Raju Mathew
- Starring: Mammootty; Mohanlal; Seema; Balan K. Nair
- Cinematography: Jayanan Vincent
- Edited by: K. Narayanan
- Music by: Shyam
- Production company: Century Films
- Distributed by: Century Films
- Release date: 6 March 1984
- Country: India
- Language: Malayalam

Aalkkoottathil Thaniye transl. Alone in the crowd) is a 1984 Indian Malayalam-language drama film directed by I. V. Sasi, written by M. T. Vasudevan Nair, and produced by Raju Mathew. It is based on the short story Swargam Thurakkunna Samayam by Nair. The film stars Mammootty, Mohanlal, Seema, and Balan K. Nair.

The film was released on 6 March 1984.

== Plot ==
Rajan is successful in his job, but his family life is not so happy. His wife, Nalini, aspires to receive a fellowship to Harvard University in the United States, leaving behind her husband and child, Babumon. When his father, Madhavan, a retired school teacher, is down with an ailment, Rajan, along with his family, returns to his ancestral home. Rajan's elder sister, Vishalam, younger sister, Seethalakshmi, and husband, Padmanabhan, also arrive to meet their father, as his health condition is serious. Madhavan's daughters and in-laws are busy in their own ways, as they don't wish to spend many days with their dying father. In his sickness, Madhavan expresses his wish to meet his niece, Ammukutty. Ammu arrives and takes care of her dying uncle. Madhavan's children except for Rajan leave as Ammu is there to look after their father. Rajan remembers his young days of romance with Ammu.

Rajan and Ammu wish to marry each other. Ammu, an elementary school teacher, encourages him and sponsors him to enroll for Master's degree in Business Administration from the prestigious Cochin University. Rajan meets Anil Kumar at the university. Rajan secures a good job once he completes the course. But then, his boss Balachandran, Madhavan's disciple, wishes to marry his daughter, Nalini, to Rajan. Madhavan, in spite of knowing his son and Ammu's love, insists that Rajan marry Nalini. Helplessly, Rajan obeys his father. Ammukutty desperately starts living alone separately in her house thereafter and continues her job.

Nalini goes to town from her ancestral home to attend her interview with Harvard University. Busy with his job, Rajan also wants to leave. Upon Ammu's request, he leaves his son with her. Babumon and Ammu become close and they spend the days happily.

Nalini passes the interview and is all set to go to the U.S. Knowing her son's relation with Ammu, she asks Rajan to bring Ammu as a servant to look after her son when she's away in the U.S. Rajan tells her Ammu is the one who spent money for his higher studies. Nalini later tries to return the amount which Ammu spent on her husband. Ammu remorsefully shouts at her. Understanding his wife's fault, Rajan slaps her and reveals their unfruitful love story. Ammukutty later feels sorry for her words and advises Nalini.

Nalini repents for her rudeness and wishes to stay back in India with her family. But upon Ammu's insistence, telling her not to lose a great opportunity, Rajan and Nalini unanimously decide to get Nalini to fly to the U.S. for her fellowship. Madhavan's health slowly recovers. Rajan, Nalini, and their son happily go back, leaving Ammukutty again in her loneliness.

== Cast ==
- Mammootty as Rajan
- Mohanlal as Anil Kumar
- Seema as Ammukkutty (Voice by Kottayam Shanta)
- Balan K. Nair as Madhavan
- Unnimary as Nalini (Voice by Aanandavalli)
- Lalu Alex as Padmanabhan
- Sumithra as Seethalakshmi (Voice By Bhagyalekshmi)
- Master Prasobh as Babumon
- Kuthiravattam Pappu as Kutti Narayanan
- Janardhanan as Balachandran
- Adoor Bhasi as Achuthan
- Sukumari as Cheeru
- Shubha as Vishalam
- Jalaja as Sindhu
- Kundara Johnny as Gopinath

== Soundtrack ==
The music was composed by Shyam, and the lyrics were written by Kavalam Narayana Panicker.

No.	Song	Singers	Lyrics	Length (m:ss)
1	"Allimalar"	S. Janaki	Kavalam Narayana Panicker	
2	"Onnaanaam Oonjal"	P. Susheela, Chorus	Kavalam Narayana Panicker	

== Reception ==
The film was a commercial success at the box office.
