= Kelkkaatha Sabdham =

- Poster featured on a magazine
- Directed by: Balachandra Menon
- Written by: Balachandra Menon
- Produced by: Raju Mathew
- Starring: Mohanlal; Nedumudi Venu; Balachandra Menon; Ambika
- Cinematography: Vipin Mohan
- Edited by: G. Venkittaraman
- Music by: Johnson
- Production company: Century Films
- Distributed by: Century Films
- Release date: 20 February 1982
- Country: India
- Language: Malayalam

Kelkkaatha Sabdham (transl. The inaudible voice) is a 1982 Indian Malayalam-language drama film written and directed by Balachandra Menon and produced by Raju Mathew. The film stars Mohanlal, Nedumudi Venu, Balachandra Menon and Ambika in the lead roles. The film has musical score by Johnson. The film was a commercial success.

== Plot ==
Babu, a womaniser, falls in love with a village girl, Jayanthi, and promises to marry her. Due to some unexpected turn of events, Babu's father does not approve of their marriage.

== Cast ==
- Nedumudi Venu as Devan
- Balachandra Menon as Lambodaran Nair
- Ambika as Jeyanthi
- Mohanlal as Babu
- Jagathy Sreekumar
- Baiju as Ravikkuttan
- Master Vineeth Govind as Jeyanthi's Son
- C. I. Paul as Sreemangalathu Narayana Pillai
- Nanditha Bose as Jeyanthi's Mother
- Poornima Jayaram as Poornima
- Shanthi Krishna as Sushma
- Jagannatha Varma as Babu's Father

== Soundtrack ==
The music was composed by Johnson and the lyrics were written by Devadas.

No.	Song	Singers	Lyrics	Length (m:ss)
1	"Aanaa Palunkukondoraana"	K. J. Yesudas, Jency	Devadas	
2	"Kannipoomaanam Kannum Nattu Njaan"	Jency, K. G. Markose	Devadas	
3	"Maanikyam"	K. J. Yesudas	Devadas	
4	"Naanam Nin Kannil	P. Jayachandran, Vani Jairam	Devadas	

== Reception ==
Kelkatha Shabdam was the first commercially successful production of Century Films.
