= Adimakal Udamakal =

1987 Indian film

- Poster designed by P. N. Menon
- Directed by: I. V. Sasi
- Written by: T. Damodaran
- Produced by: Raju Mathew
- Starring: Mohanlal; Mammootty; Nalini; Seema
- Cinematography: Jayaram V.
- Edited by: K. Narayanan
- Music by: Shyam
- Production company: Century Films
- Distributed by: Century Release
- Release date: 10 April 1987
- Running time: 149 minutes
- Country: India
- Language: Malayalam

Adimakal Udamakal (lit. 'Slaves and Masters') is a 1987 Indian Malayalam-language social problem film directed by I. V. Sasi, written by T. Damodaran, and produced by Raju Mathew. The film stars Mohanlal, Mammootty, Nalini and Seema, with Ratheesh, Mukesh, Urvashi, Jagathi Sreekumar, Captain Raju, Lissy, Sukumari and Santhakumari playing supporting roles.

== Plot ==
A trade Union is headed by Raghavan. Mill owner brings new manager Mohan Cheriyan to solve the company's issues with trade union leaders. Meanwhile, Indu, Mill owner's sister is attracted to Mohan. Nexus between politicians and factory owners is formed, who dump workers for their selfish deeds.

When the company is about to lay off due to union problems, Raghavan suggests a new formula for solving the company issues and this saves the company. The issue is resolved. However many union members turn against Raghavan.

At the end, chaos breaks out and Raghavan is killed by his own union members who despise him. Mohan is seen holding cloth covered in Raghavan's blood symbolizing Communist flag and idea of "blood and sweat".

== Cast ==
- Mohanlal as Mohan Cheriyan, the manager
- Mammootty as Raghavan, the union leader
- Nalini as Devootty, Mohan's love interest
- Seema as Radha
- Urvashi as Indhu
- Ratheesh as Sukumaran
- Balan K. Nair as Karunakaran Nambiar
- K. P. Ummer as Andrews
- Jagathi Sreekumar as Mukundan
- Lizy as Raji
- Thilakan as Gopalan
- Sankaradi as Govindan
- Mukesh as Jayan
- Captain Raju as Sathyan
- Mamukkoya as Pocker
- Janardhanan as Ramachandran
- Sukumari as Janu
- Devan as Vijayan
- Valsala Menon as Madhavi
- Kundara Johny as Joseph
- Jagannatha Varma as R. K. Shenoy
- Santhakumari as Sarada
- T. P. Madhavan as Minister
- Augustine as Abootty

== Release ==
The film was released on 10 April 1987 and was a commercial success.
