= Sradha =

- Video CD cover
- Directed by: I. V. Sasi
- Screenplay by: T. Damodaran; Dr. Rajendrababu
- Produced by: Anand Kumar
- Starring: Mohanlal; Arun Pandian
- Cinematography: Jayanan Vincent
- Edited by: J. Murali Narayanan
- Music by: Bharadwaj
- Production company: Adithya Kalamandir
- Distributed by: Hi-Power Movie Release
- Release date: 7 July 2000
- Running time: 155 minutes
- Country: India
- Language: Malayalam

Sradha (transl. Focus) is a 2000 Indian Malayalam language action film directed by I. V. Sasi and written by T. Damodaran and Dr. Rajendrababu. The film stars Mohanlal and Arun Pandian (in his Malayalam debut) in the lead roles. It features a musical score and soundtrack composed by Bharadwaj. The plot follows the investigations of a police squad, led by Ganga Prasad (Mohanlal) into a terrorist threat in the city. The film was released on 7 July 2000 and ended up as a critical and commercial failure. It was dubbed and released in Tamil titled Dhool Police and in Telugu as Abhi.

== Plot ==
Ganga Prasad is a police officer of the Anti-Terrorist Wing of the State Police. He is married to Suma and they have a son, Abi. A girl, Swapna, who is attracted to Prasad, falls in love with him. Meanwhile, a group of hard-core terrorists, led by Dr. Lucifer Munna and Janeesha, wreak havoc in various parts of the city. How Gangaprasad resolves the terrorist attack forms the climax of the movie.

== Cast ==
- Mohanlal as DIG Gangaprasad IPS, Director-Anti Terrorist Wing
- Arun Pandian as Dr. Lucifer Munna
- Abhirami as Swapna
- Sangeetha as Janeesha
- Shobhana as Suma Gangaprasad, Gangaprasad's wife
- Indraja as CI Sudha
- Seema as Nandini Balachandran, Gangaprasad's family friend, who runs a play school for children
- Vijayakumar as ACP Narendran IPS, Anti Terrorist Wing officer
- Devan as Chief Minister Balachandran
- Kozhikode Narayanan Nair as Sukumaran, Ganga Prasad's father
- Janardhanan as Ayyappan, Swapna's father
- Kunchan as Chandrappan
- Mayuri Kango
- V. K. Sreeraman as Jayadevan IPS, Commissioner of Police
- Major Ravi as Aravindakshan, IB Officer
- Spadikam George as DGP Karunakaran IPS
- Reshmi Soman as Beena
- Anu Anand as Shaju
- Bindu Ramakrishnan as Ganga Prasad's mother
- Lekshmi Rattan
- Sidharaj as SP Rajashekharan IPS
- Yamuna as SI
- Mini Agustine

== Soundtrack ==
The soundtrack was composed by Bharadwaj and released by the label Satyam Audios.

Sradha

Soundtrack album by Bharadwaj
- Released: 2000
- Genre: Feature film soundtrack
- Label: Satyam Audios
- Producer: Bharadwaj

Bharadwaj chronology
Parthen Rasithen (2000)	Sradha (2000)	Penngal (2000)

All lyrics are written by Gireesh Puthenchery; all music is composed by Bharadwaj.

No.	Title	Artist(s)	Length
1.	"Aadyaanuraagam"	M. G. Sreekumar
2.	"Chola Malamkaattadikkanu"	M. G. Sreekumar, Sujatha Mohan
3.	"Megharagathil"	Sunanda
4.	"Megharagathil"	K. J. Yesudas
5.	"Neeyen Jeevanil"	K. S. Chithra
6.	"Onnu Thottene Ninne"	M. G. Sreekumar
7.	"Onnu Thottene Ninne"	K. S. Chithra, M. G. Sreekumar
8.	"Party Party Time [Oh Little]"	M. G. Sreekumar, Sujatha Mohan
