= Captain Raju =

Indian film actor

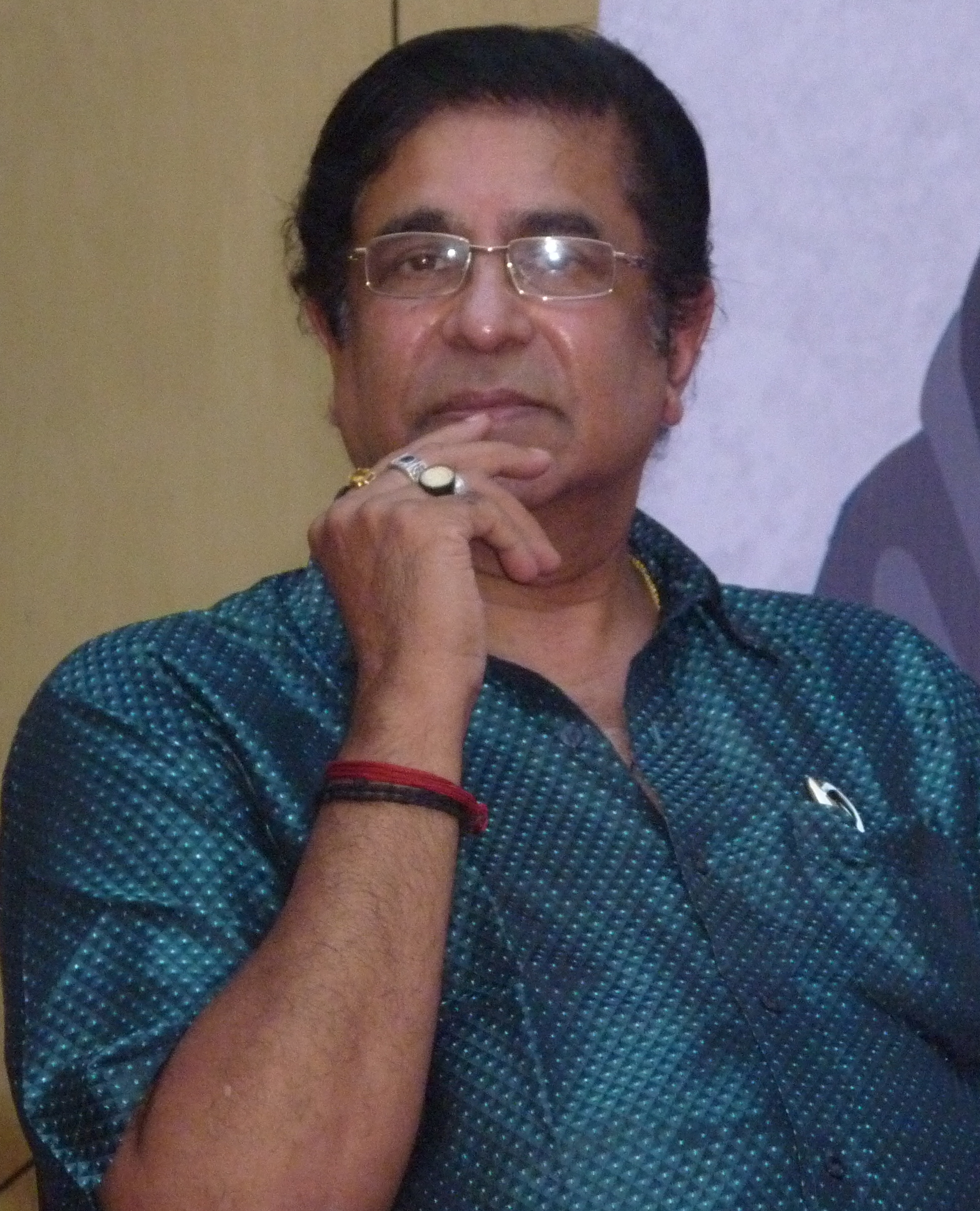
- Captain Raju at Model Engineering College
- Born: Raju Daniel; 27 June 1950; Omallur, State of Travancore-Cochin (now in Pathanamthitta, Kerala), India
- Died: 17 September 2018 (aged 68); Kochi, Kerala, India
- Education: Catholicate College
- Occupations: Actor; Army officer

Raju Daniel
- Military career
- Allegiance: India
- Branch: Indian Army; Regiment of Artillery
- Service years: 1971 – 1976
- Rank: Captain

Raju Daniel (27 June 1950 – 17 September 2018), better known by his stage name Captain Raju, was an Indian actor and former army officer. He acted in more than 600 films in various languages, including Malayalam, Hindi, Tamil, Telugu, Kannada, and English. He was best known for his performances in character roles, and as a villain. He also appeared in television serials and advertisements and has also directed two Malayalam films. The comic professional assassin character called Pavanayi that he played in the movie Nadodikkattu developed a cult status in Malayalam cinema.

== Personal life ==
Raju was the third of the seven children of K. G. Daniel and Annamma, and was born at Omallur, Pathanamthitta, Kerala. He has four sisters named Elizabeth, Saji, Sophy, Sudha and two brothers, George and Mohan. Both his parents were teachers at Govt. UP School Omalloor. He had his primary education from Govt. UP School Omalloor and NSS English Medium School, Omalloor. He was a volleyball player. He pursued a degree in zoology from Catholicate College, Pathanamthitta. After graduation, Raju joined the Indian Army as a short-service commissioned officer at the age of 21 and was commissioned into the Regiment of Artillery and rose to the rank of a captain. Captain Raju is an alumnus of the prestigious Officers Training Academy, Chennai. He worked as marketing chief at glucose and starch manufacturing company, Lakshmi Starch, at Mumbai after serving 5 years with Indian army and later he left the job to act in films. While working at the company, he started acting in amateur drama troupes like Prathiba theatres in Mumbai. He later moved to films. He made his directorial debut with the Malayalam film Etha Oru Snehagatha in 1997. His second film as director was Mr. Pavanayi 99.99 (2012) in which he reprised the role of Mr. Pavanayi, his character from the 1987 Malayalam film Nadodikkattu.

He was married to Prameela, and had a son, Ravi. He was a Christian by birth, but also respected other religions, and even visited the others' shrines. He was a native of Puthenpeedika, Pathanamthitta. He was observed as very dynamic and vibrant during his childhood. He was also an active member of St. George Orthodox Church, Palarivattom. His parents' wish was to see him become a priest, about which he expressed at several places. He was a staunch Orthodox believer and his contributions to the Church and the society are noteworthy.

== Film career ==
Captain Raju first acted in an unreleased Hindi movie along with Tariq (Yaadon Ki Baraat fame) in 1980 as the supporting hero even before he made his break in Malayalam movies. Raju made his debut in Malayalam with the 1981 multi-starrer movie Raktham. The co-actor in the movie Madhu was greatly impressed with his performance. This made Madhu cast him as the hero in his first home production Rathilayam, which was a movie with A-listers of that era including Soman, Shanavas Rajkumar and Menaka. Captain Raju played the hero role in the movie with Silk Smitha as his heroine. Many B-grade films were made inspired by Rathilayam with Raju himself playing the lead in such low-budget masala films towards the late eighties.

But Captain Raju had established himself as a popular actor even before this phase. His first memorable role came out in the 1984 movie Athiratram, where he played a lead role along with Mamootty and Mohanlal. He also played some of the popular villain characters during this era. In the 1986 movie Aavanazhi, he played the villain role of Sathyaraj which was well appreciated. The grand success of this movie made him one of the busiest actors in Malayalam cinema. It was in the 1988 movie August 1 where Raju probably played the biggest villain role in his career. Raju's act as the unnamed killer determined to assassinate the Kerala Chief Minister was one of the high points of the film. It is considered one of the best villain characters in Malayalam cinema. In the movie Samryajyam, he played an antagonist gangster opposite to that of Mammootty. Khalid in Vyooham (1990) and Pathrose in Adwaitham (1992) were some of the other noted villain characters portrayed by him during the early 90s. His role as Aringodar of Oru Vadakkan Veeragatha was one of the characters which helped Captain Raju to change his track from villain characters (other being Pavanai). This movie helped him to reveal his true potential as a character actor. He also had a notable role in the 1988 movie Oru CBI Diary Kurippu. Captain Raju eventually stopped acting in villain roles during the early 90's. With the 1994 movie Kabooliwala, he became more selective and his role as Madassery Thampi in Puthukkottayile Puthumanavalan was a clear step towards this. He is also known for portraying the powerful elder brother role in the 1993 movie Uppukandam Brothers.

Raju is also known for playing some of the memorable comic characters. He became a household name in Malayalam cinema after his brief role as the comical assassin Pavanayi in Nadodikkattu. The character eventually attained a cult status in Kerala. The classic dialogue "Pavanayi Shavamayi” (Pavanayi is dead) along with the terms such as Malappuram Kathi, Ambum Villum, Transistor Bomb is still popular. His character as Karunan Chandakavala (Detective Karamchand) in the 2003 slapstick CID Moosa was also appreciated. Captain Raju reprised his iconic character Pavanayi in the movie Mr. Pavanayi 99.99. The movie's production was completed in 2012, but was released only a year after his death in 2019 due to some issues with producer. This was also his second movie as a director with the first being Oru Snehagadha released in 1997. Captain Raju's last movie was the 2017 Mammootty starrer Masterpiece, where he appeared as himself after a four-year break, as he was recovering from a road accident injury.

== Death ==
A healthy, strong man during his youth, who gave increased importance to fitness, thanks to his military career, Raju's health was severely affected by a car accident, which occurred in October 2003 at Kuthiran near Thrissur. He was seriously injured, and was hospitalised for a long period. Though he survived, he lost the vision in his left eye, and also had problems with walking. But he remained active in films and public.

During his last days, Raju suffered from various ailments like diabetes and hypertension. He had a heart attack in 2015, for which he had treatment. He suffered a massive stroke during a plane journey to New York on 25 June 2018, and was admitted to a hospital in Muscat. He was returned to Kochi for further treatment, and later left for his home. He died aged 68 in the morning of 17 September 2018 at his residence in Palarivattom, Kochi. He was buried with full state honours at Puthenpeedika St. Mary's Orthodox Church, Pathanamthitta on 21 September.

== Filmography ==
=== As actor ===
==== Malayalam ====
===== 1980s =====
Year	Title	Role	Notes
1981	Raktham	Gunda	
1982	Thadaakam	Jabbar Khaan	
1982	Chilanthivala	Aravindan	
1982	Pooviriyum Pulari	Reghu's father	
1982	John Jaffer Janardhanan	Renji	
1983	Coolie	Vikraman	
1983	Mortuary	Raju	
1983	Iniyengilum	Prasad	
1983	Passport	Nagedran	
1983	Nathi Muthal Nathi Vare	Vishnu	
1983	Aana	Ranger Narendran	
1983	Rathilayam	Appukuttan	
1983	Asuran		
1983	Ponnethooval		
1983	Changatham	Prem	
1984	Athirathram	Rajesh	
1984	Theere Pratheekshikkathe	Mohan	
1984	Kadamattathachan	Neeli's lover	
1984	Kurishuyudham	Magician d'Souza/Lawrence	
1984	Kooduthedunna Parava	Sub-inspector	
1984	Oru Sumangaliyude Katha	SI Vijayan	
1984	Minimol Vathicanil	CID Inspector	
1984	Thirakal	Chandran	
1984	Paavam Krooran	Dasan	
1984	Unni Vanna Divasam	Ashok	
1984	Shabadham	Prasad	
1985	Premalekhanam	Babu	
1985	Kiraatham		
1985	Saandham Bheekaram		
1985	Sammelanam	Basheer	
1985	Aazhi		
1985	Soundarya Pinakkam		
1985	Ezhu Muthal Onpathu Vare		
1985	Nayakan	Rahim	
1985	Janakeeya Kodathi	Ayyappan	
1985	Ee Sabdam Innathe Sabdam	SP Gopinathan IPS	
1985	Karimpinpoovinakkare	Pappachan	
1986	Prathyekam Sradhikkukka	Shukkoor	
1986	Hello My Dear Wrong Number	David Antony Fernandez	
1986	Nimishangal	Khalid	
1986	Aavanazhi	Sathyaraj	
1987	Kalathinte Shabdham	Devarajan	
1987	Ivare Sookshikkuka		
1987	Ithrayum Kaalam		
1987	Ee Noottandile Maharogam		
1987	Theekattu	Basheer	
1987	Yaagagni		
1987	Naalkavala	Robert	
1987	Aattakatha		
1987	Neeyallengil Njan	Balachandran	
1987	Vrutham	Victor	
1987	Nadodikkattu	Mr. Pavanayi	
1987	Amrutham Gamaya	Suku	
1987	Oru Sindoora Pottinte Ormaykku	C.K. Gupta	
1987	Adimakal Udamakal	Sathyan	
1988	Simon Peter Ninakku Vendi	Ramji	
1988	Innaleyude Baakki	Doctor	
1988	Charavalayam	Basheer	
1988	Evidence	Damu	
1988	Aranyakam	Police Officer	
1988	Oru CBI Diary Kurippu	Dy SP Prabhakara Varma	
1988	August 1	Nicholas	
1989	Vaadaka Gunda		
1989	Anagha	Nalini's father	
1989	Mudra	Paul	
1989	Mahaaraajaavu		
1989	Miss Pamela	SI Rajan Philippose	
1989	My Dear Rosy	Vijay	
1989	Agnipravesham		
1989	Aazhikkoru Muthu		
1989	Oru Vadakkan Veeragatha	Aringodar	

===== 1990s =====
Year	Title	Role	Notes
1990	Crime Branch	CI Balachandran	
1990	Innale	C.I. Satheeshan	
1990	Vyooham	Khalid	
1990	Saandram	C.I. Hari	
1990	No.20 Madras Mail	Himself	Cameo
1990	Nammude Naadu	SP Devarajan	
1990	Enquiry		
1990	Naale Ennundengil	Narendran	
1990	Kadathanadan Ambadi	Kowliya Maharajah	
1990	Arhatha	Shekhu	
1990	Appu	Suresh	
1990	Samrajyam	Krishnadas	
1991	Kalamorukkam	Prasad, Damodharan Nair	
1991	Chakravarthy	Chandrachoodan	
1991	Neelagiri		
1991	Kankettu	Peter Lal	
1991	Ragam Anuragam	A. K. Menon	
1992	Mahaan	Ismail	
1992	Kavacham	Private Detective	
1992	Adhwaytham	Pathrose	
1992	Rajashilpi	Bhadran	
1993	Uppukandam Brothers	Uppukandam Kariachan	
1994	Kabooliwala	Circus Owner	
1994	Gentleman Security	Commander Rajkumar	
1994	Sankeerthanam		
1995	Puthukkottayile Puthumanavalan	Madassery Thampi	
1995	Special Squad	Customs Collector Rajan Varghese	
1995	Thakshashila	Major Madhavan	
1995	Agnidevan	Pareeth	
1996	Kalyana Sougandhikam	Neelakantan Vaidyar	
1997	Sankeerthanam Pole	Fr. Zakariya	
1997	Itha Oru Snehagatha	Fr. Daniel	
1998	Sooryavanam	Marshall	
1998	Mattupetti Machan	Mattupetti Mahadevan	
1998	Elavamkodu Desam	Udayavarmman	
1998	Daya	King	
1999	Udayapuram Sulthan	Abdul Rahman	
1999	Thachiledathu Chundan	Velupillai	
1999	Pranaya Nilavu	Hajiyar	
1999	Olympian Anthony Adam		
1999	Stalin Sivadas	Contractor Narendran	
1999	My Dear Karadi	S.I. Keshavan	
1999	Captain	Ranger Jayadevan	
1999	The Godman	Crime Branch Officer	
1999	Ezhupunna Tharakan	Chacko Tharakan	
1999	Aayiram Meni	Unnithan	
1999	Red Indians	Commissioner	

===== 2000s =====
Year	Title	Role	Notes
2000	Snehapoorvam Anna	Jomon's father	
2000	Valliettan	DySP Mohammed Ilias	
2001	Sraavu	Commissioner Mohan Roy	
2001	Bhadra		
2001	Rakshasa Rajavu	DGP Joseph Mathew IPS	
2001	Sharja To Sharja	Kanaran Kappithan	
2002	Puthooramputhri Unniyarcha	Kannappa Chekavar	
2002	Swarna Medal	Ravi Varman	
2002	Punyam		
2002	Thandavam	Commissioner Rajeevan	
2003	C.I.D. Moosa	Karunan Chanthakkavala	
2003	Soudamini		
2003	Pattalam	Colonel Kannappan	
2003	War and Love	Brig. Nair	
2004	Kottaram Vaidyan		
2004	Wanted	Police Officer	
2004	Sathyam	City Police Commissioner	
2005	Twinkle Twinkle Little Star		
2005	Deepangal Sakshi		
2005	Boyy Friennd	DGP Chandrakumar	
2006	Vargam	Arakkal Aboobakkar Haaji	
2006	Kilukkam Kilukilukkam	Col. Panikkar	
2006	Red Salute	Joseph Thomas	
2006	Ashwaroodan	Vishwanathan	
2006	Thuruppugulan		
2006	Aanachandam		
2007	Speed Track	College Principal	
2007	Avan Chandiyude Makan	Vicar	
2007	Black Cat		
2007	Goal		
2007	Nasrani	Kottarathil John	
2008	Mayakazhcha		
2008	Kovalam		
2008	Twenty:20		
2009	Pazhassi Raja	Mancheriyil Unnimootha	
2009	Sanmanasullavan Appukuttan		

===== 2010s =====
Year	Title	Role	Notes
2010	Happy Durbar		
2010	Yakshiyum Njanum	Aathira's father	
2011	Arjunan Saakshi	Chief Minister	
2011	China Town	Vincent Gomez	
2012	Theruvu Nakshatrangal		
2013	Ezhamathe Varavu	Chief Archaeologist	
2013	Abhiyum Njanum	Devanandan	
2013	Mumbai Police	IG Gopinathan Nair IPS	
2014	Masala Republic	Chinese Chandran	
2015	Nikkah		
2015	Aashamsakalode Anna		
2016	Poyi Maranju Parayaathe		
2016	Appuram Bengal Ippuram Thiruvithamkoor		
2017	Masterpiece	Himself	Extended Cameo
2018	Stethoscope		
2019	Mr. Pavanayi 99.99	Mr. Pavanayi	
2019	Valiyaperunnal	Raju Daniel	
2019	Lessons		

==== Tamil ====
Year	Title	Role	Notes
1984	Nalla Naal	Pannaiyar	
1987	Kadamai Kanniyam Kattupaadu		
1987	Jallikattu	Commissioner Sivaprasad	
1987	Ullam Kavarntha Kalvan		
1988	Dharmathin Thalaivan	Bhaskar	
1988	En Jeevan Paduthu	Chakravarthy	
1988	Soora Samhaaram	Chakkaravarthy	
1988	Sudhanthira Naattin Adimaigal		
1988	Dhayam Onnu		
1988	Jeeva	DSP Dhairiyam	
1989	Chinnappadass	Ravi Prakash	
1989	En Rathathin Rathame		
1989	Thaai Naadu	Colonel Ramasundhar	
1989	Meenakshi Thiruvilayadal	Yatchan	
1992	Naangal	Naveen Kumar	
1992	Sevagan	Sabapathy	
1992	Sivantha Malar		
1993	Ulle Veliye		
1993	Pratap		
1993	Madurai Meenakshi	Ulaganathan	
1994	Priyanka	Gokulnath	
1994	Rajakumaran	Selvaraj	
1995	Veluchami		
2007	Ninaithu Ninaithu Parthen	Mohammed Aslam	
2011	Ponnar Shankar	Chellatha Gounder	

==== Telugu ====
Year	Title	Role	Notes
1982	Balidanam		
1987	Marana Sasanam	'Black Tiger' Satyaraj	
1991	Sathruvu	DIG Prakash Rao	
1991	Rowdy Alludu	Ranjith Kumar	
1992	Rowdy Inspector	S.P.	
1992	Mondi Mogudu Penki Pellam		
1993	Kondapalli Raja	Daniel	
1993	Tholi Muddhu	Mr. Gupta	
1993	Rowdy Mogudu	D.S.P. Chinna Rao	
1993	Police Lockup		
1993	Amma Koduku		
1994	Jailor Gaari Abbayi	Bapineedu	
1994	Gandeevam	Michael	
1995	Maatho Pettukoku	Chakravarthy	
1999	Pichodi Chetilo Raayi	Maharadhi	

==== Kannada ====
- Jai Karnataka (1989)
- Nyayakkaagi Naanu (1989)

==== Hindi ====
- Kashmakash (2011)

==== English ====
- Cotton Mary (1999) as Inspector Ramiji Raj

=== As director ===
- Mr. Pavanayi 99.99 (2019)
- Itha Oru Snehagatha (1997)

== Television ==
Serials

- Nizhalukal (Asianet)
- Crime Branch (Kairali TV)
- Paliyathachan (Doordarshan)
- Pandavapada (Doordarshan)
- Vinodasala (Doordarshan)
- Vikramadithyan (Asianet)
- Alavudeenum albhuthavilakum (Asianet)
- Dracula (Asianet)
- Unniyarcha (Asianet)
- Mahathmagandhi colony (Asianet)
- Sreemahabhagavatham (Asianet)
- Vallarpadathamma (Shalom)
- Kudumbasametham Manikutty (Jaihind TV)
- Pakida Pakida Pambaram
- Makal

Shows

- Airtel Challenge as Quiz master (Jeevan TV)
