= Vrutham =

- Promotional Poster
- Directed by: I. V. Sasi
- Written by: T. Damodaran; John Paul
- Produced by: Raju Mathew
- Starring: Kamal Haasan; Shobana; Suresh Gopi; Geetha; Captain Raju
- Cinematography: V. Jayaram
- Edited by: K. Narayanan
- Music by: Shyam
- Production company: Central Productions
- Distributed by: Central Productions
- Release date: 22 May 1987
- Country: India
- Language: Malayalam

Vrutham is a 1987 Indian Malayalam-language film, directed by I. V. Sasi and produced by Raju Mathew for Central Pictures, starring Kamal Haasan, Suresh Gopi, Geetha, Captain Raju, Thilakan and Shobana.

The film marked the return of Kamal Haasan to Malayalam language films after 1982. Actor Suresh Gopi in the earlier period of his career did a supporting role in this film. The film did moderate business. This movie dubbed into Tamil-language as Viratham and released on 10 September 1987.

== Plot ==
Vrutham is a family oriented revenge film where Balu gets falsely implicated in a murder and his quest for revenge on the wrongdoers.

== Cast ==
- Kamal Haasan as Balu
- Shobana as Nancy, Balu's Love interest (dubbed by Ambili dubbing artist)
- Suresh Gopi as Sunny Abraham
- Geetha as Radha Menon
- Captain Raju as Victor
- M. G. Soman as Charlie
- Sreenath as James Chacko
- Sukumari as Savithri
- K.P.A.C. Sunny as Barristor Vinod Menon
- Thilakan as Chackochan
- Janardanan as Avarachan
- Babu Antony as Freddy
- Rohini as Thresia
- Prathapachandran as Stephen, Nancy's Father
- Sankaradi as Ganeshan Kaimal
- Jagannatha Varma as Subrahmanya Iyer
- Kundara Johnny as Harindran
- Vincent as Kanaran, Customs Officer
- Devan as Devadas
- C. I. Paul as Chandran Pillai
- Thodupuzha Vasanthi as Janaki
- Jose Prakash as Bhargavan Menon, Jailor
- Valsala Menon
- T. P. Madhavan as Prasad
- Kunjandi as jailmate
- Jayalalita as Julie

== Soundtrack ==
Vrutham

Soundtrack album by Shyam
- Released: 1987
- Genre: Feature film soundtrack
- Length: 11:22
- Language: Malayalam

The music was composed by Shyam and lyrics were written by Bichu Thirumala.

No.	Song	Singers	Lyrics
1	"Sirakalil Swayam Kozhinja"...	K. J. Yesudas, K. S. Chithra	Bichu Thirumala
2	"Kodumkaattilengo"...	K. J. Yesudas, K. S. Chithra, Pattom Sadan	Bichu Thirumala
3	"Asuresha Thaalam"...	K. J. Yesudas, Chorus	Bichu Thirumala
