= The Godman =

- Poster
- Directed by: K. Madhu
- Written by: Suresh Pathissery
- Produced by: Thanoof Karim
- Starring: Mammootty; Vani Viswanath; Indraja; Murali; Ratheesh
- Cinematography: Salu George
- Edited by: K.Sankunni
- Release date: 28 June 1999
- Country: India
- Language: Malayalam

The Godman is a 1999 Indian Malayalam film, directed by K. Madhu. The film stars Mammootty, Vani Viswanath, Indraja, Murali and Ratheesh in lead roles.

== Cast ==
- Mammootty as Circle Inspector M. Amarnath
- Vani Viswanath as Advocate Aswathy Menon
- Murali as Home Minister Abdul Rahim
- Indraja as Mumthaz Rahim
- Ratheesh as City Police Commissioner Chandrashekharan
- Mahesh Anand as John Britto
- Maniyanpilla Raju as Sub Inspector Karipetti Marthandan
- Rizabawa as Circle Inspector Joseph Chacko
- Sai Kumar as Minister Jayadevan
- Kozhikode Narayanan Nair as Chief Minister Hariharan Menon
- Spadikam George as G.K. Krishnan
- Sathaar as A. Khader Sahib
- Kaviyoor Ponnamma as Lakshmi, Amarnath's Mother
- Captain Raju as Karthikeyan, Crime Branch Officer
- C. I. Paul as Bhargavan Pillai
- Subair as Sudeep, Police Officer
- Santhosh as Moideen
- Kollam Ajith as Amir Ali
- Tony as Krishnankutty
- Shivaji as Hameed
- Sadiq as Bhaskaran
- Kollam Thulasi as Menon
- Meghanathan as Prabhu
- T. P. Madhavan as Kareem Abudullah
- Poojappura Radhakrishnan as Vareethu
- Sona Nair as Cameo Appearance
- Kuttyedathi Vilasini as Cameo Appearance
- Abdul Vahab (Cameo Appearance as Sub Inspector)

== Awards ==
- Kerala State Film Award for Best Dubbing Artist – Sreeja for Vani Viswanath
