= Naayika =

- Theatrical release poster
- Directed by: Jayaraj
- Written by: Deedi Damodaran
- Produced by: Thomas Benjamin
- Starring: Mamtha Mohandas; Sarada; Jayaram; Padmapriya
- Cinematography: Sinu Sidharth
- Edited by: Sobin K Soman
- Music by: M. K. Arjunan
- Production company: Makayiram Creations
- Release date: 25 November 2011
- Country: India
- Language: Malayalam

Naayika (English: Heroine) is a 2011 Indian Malayalam drama film directed by Jayaraj. The film stars Urvasi Sharada, Jayaram, Padmapriya, and Mamta Mohandas in the lead roles.

== Plot ==
Naayika tells the life and times of yesteryears' heroine of Malayalam cinema. It is the story of Gracy, a leading star until she suddenly disappeared from the silver screen. Gracy loves Anand who was playing roles as the evergreen star Prem Nazir when he suddenly has a blood-related disease. He loses too much of his blood through his nose and dies during his last film with his bride-to-be. Gracy stops acting and disappears from the silver screen. She likes to adopt a young girl, but the girl wants to star in the next film Gracy is in. The girl's dress falls off, she goes nude, and it appears in the film. She begs for the negative clip from the producer but he wants her to return sexual favors. However, when the film is released, the negative clip is still there which breaks her heart. The girl tells the producer that she will disclose his intentions to the public, making him conscious and plan to kill her. He orders her makeup man to poison her lipstick and kill her. The girl is poisoned on her lips and dies. This results in Gracy losing her mental stability. Mamtha comes as a female reporter, trying to investigate the case and reveal the truth.

== Cast ==
- Mamta Mohandas as Aleena
- Sharada as Gracy
  - Padmapriya as Young Gracy
- Jayaram as Anand
- Sarayu as Vani
  - Nayanthara as Young Vani
- Jagathy Sreekumar
- Hakim Rawther as cameraman
- KPAC Lalitha as Sister
- Salim Kumar as Gracy's father
- Sukumari as Herself
- Siddique as Film producer Stephen Muthalali
- Ambika Mohan as Gracy's mother
- Narayanankutty

=== Uncredited cast ===
(Video Shots of old actresses used in the title song)

- Ambika
- Jayabharathi
- KR Vijaya
- Lakshmi
- Monisha
- Seema
- Sreevidya
- Sumalatha

...

== Production ==
After the dismal performance of his few previous films, including The Train with Mammootty, director Jayaraj did Naayika. A take on the life of a yesteryear heroine, this film has Jayaram, Padmapriya, and senior actress Sharada in the lead roles. The film has Padmapriya playing the younger ages of Sharada. The movie was produced by Thomas Benjamin. Jayaram appears in a role with subtle comparisons with the 'evergreen star Prem Nazir'. The film features songs by M. K. Arjunan and Sreekumaran Thampi who had composed for many Prem Nazir films.

== Soundtrack ==
The film's soundtrack contains five songs, all composed by M. K. Arjunan and the lyrics were written by Sreekumaran Thampi.

| # | Title | Singer(s) |
|---|---|---|
| 1 | "Kasthuri Manakkunnallo" | K. J. Yesudas |
| 2 | "Nanayum Nin Mizhiyoram" | P. Jayachandran, Sujatha Mohan |
| 3 | "Nanayum Nin Mizhiyoram(M)" | P. Jayachandran |
| 4 | "Nilavu Pol Oru Amma" | K. S. Chitra |
| 5 | "Pazhayoru Rajani Than" | K. J. Yesudas, K. S. Chitra |
