= Ee Nadu =

- Theatrical release poster
- Directed by: I. V. Sasi
- Written by: T. Damodaran
- Produced by: N. G. John
- Starring: Balan K. Nair; Ratheesh; Mammootty; T. G. Ravi; Kuthiravattam Pappu; Krishnachandran
- Cinematography: S. S. Chandramohan; C. E. Babu
- Edited by: K. Narayanan
- Music by: Shyam
- Distributed by: Geo Pictures
- Release date: 14 April 1982
- Country: India
- Language: Malayalam

Ee Nadu is a 1982 Indian Malayalam-language political film directed by I. V. Sasi, written by T. Damodaran and produced by N. G. John. The film stars Balan K. Nair with Mammootty, Ratheesh, and T. G. Ravi in supporting roles. The music score was handled by Shyam. The film talks about how politicians and the rich people in society exploit their power and ignore the pleas of the general public. This film was loosely based on a spate of liquor poisonings that occurred in Vypeen in Kerala that claimed 77 lives.

The film was released on 14 April 1982 and was a commercial and critical success. The film went on to become the highest grossing South Indian film of 1982. N. G. John won the 1982 Filmfare Award for Best Malayalam Film for the film. The film was remade in Telugu with the same name. It was also remade in Hindi as Yeh Desh and in Tamil as Idhu Enga Naadu.

== Plot ==
A group of students at a college, led by Prathapan, constantly cause problems on campus by instigating strikes and harassing female students. Venu, a corrupt politician from a small political party, is the MLA in the area. Venu's party's support is crucial for the ruling government, which would lose its majority in the house without it. Meanwhile, the people in the area are fighting against water pollution caused by a factory, but Venu accepts bribes from the factory and refuses to take any action. Comrade Krishna Pillai, Venu's uncle, is an honest and ideological politician who helped organise the people in their fight against the factory. Pillai goes to the excise minister, a former friend of his, to put a stop to the factory, but the minister is associated with Venu and says he cannot do anything.

Meanwhile, Salim, a Kerala man employed in the Gulf and a well-wisher of Pillai, returns home and offers his support for Pillai's organising people against the factory. Porinju, a local spurious liquor maker and party goon of Venu's party, returns from jail. The liquor supply in the area is controlled by a wealthy liquor baron named Karunakaran, who is also the father of Prathapan. Karunakaran's goons attack Porinju's liquor unit. Venu arranges a compromise between Porinju and Karunakaran, and Porinju starts making liquor for Karunakaran.

Prathapan creates issues at college again by forcefully kissing a poor girl named Radha. The principal dismisses him from college, but Venu intervenes and gets him back in the college. Prathapan takes revenge on Radha for complaining to the principal, and Radha jumps off the window and dies. Prathapan and his gang are arrested by Alexander, an honest policeman who is not ready to take bribes from Karunakaran and leave Prathapan. However, when he receives orders from his superiors, he is forced to let Prathapan go. Meanwhile, Pillai meets with Prathapan's mother and it is revealed that they knew each other in the past when Pillai was in hiding due to his party activities, and Pillai was about to marry her. But Karunakaran, an assistant of Pillai at the time, cheated Pillai and betrayed him to the police.

Salim returns home again, but this time he has lost his job in the Gulf. Meanwhile, a big party meeting is happening in the area. Karunakaran forces Porinju to mix surgical spirit to supply large amounts of liquor for the event. Over 2,000 people die after consuming spurious liquor. Alexander investigates the case. He has all the evidence against Karunakaran but is offered a bribe to leave Karunakaran out of the case. Alexander loses faith in the system and decides to accept the bribe. Karunakaran's release from the case leads to public outrage, and the government asks the excise minister to resign. Venu decides to remove support for the government and form a new government with him as chief minister. Pillai organises people against Venu. Karunakaran sends his henchmen to kill Pillai, and he is killed in front of Karunakaran's wife, who then informs the police. Karunakaran is arrested. Venu's chances of becoming chief minister are halted by the people.

== Cast ==
- Balan K. Nair as Comrade Krishna Pillai
- Ratheesh as Venu
- Mammootty as Salim
- T. G. Ravi as Karunakaran
- Raveendran as. Prathapan
- Anjali Naidu as Nabeeza Salim
- Sreenivasan as P. P. Sreenivasan
- Krishnachandran as Sasi
- Lalu Alex as A.S.P. Alexander
- Prathapachandran as Minister Govindan
- Sankaradi as. Kuttyahamed
- Vanitha Krishnachandran as Radha
- Aranmula Ponnamma as Parvathiamma
- Santhakumari as Dakshayani
- Paravoor Bharathan as Bharathan
- Shubha as Sreedevi
- Kunjandi as Bheeran
- Alummoodan as Reporter
- Manavalan Joseph as Police Constable
- Sathaar as Rajagopala Varma
- Thrissur Elsy as Maria
- Kuthiravattom Pappu as Khader
- G. K. Pillai as Joshi John
- Surekha as Chempakam
- Achankunju as Porinju
- Thodupuzha Radhakrishnan as Majeed
- Nellikode Bhaskaran as Gopalan
- P. K. Abraham as College Principal

== Release and reception ==
The film was released on 14 April 1982. It received positive reviews. N. G. John won the Filmfare Award for Best Film - Malayalam for the year 1982 for the film.

The film was a commercial success. It was the highest grossing South Indian film of 1982.

== Soundtrack ==
The music was composed by Shyam and the lyrics were written by Yusufali Kechery.

No.	Song	Singers	Lyrics
1	"Aakaasha Perunthachan"	S. Janaki, J. M. Raju	Yusufali Kechery
2	"Ambili Manavatti Azhakulla Manavaatti"	K. J. Yesudas, S. Janaki, P. Jayachandran, C. O. Anto, J. M. Raju, S. P. Sailaja	Yusufali Kechery
3	"Iru Meyyaanennaalum" (Bit)	J. M. Raju	Yusufali Kechery
4	"Maanathe Hoori Pole"	Unni Menon, Chorus	Yusufali Kechery
5	"Maanathe Kottaarathil" (Bit)	S. Janaki	Yusufali Kechery
6	"Thattedi Sosamme"	Chorus, J. M. Raju, Krishnachandran	Yusufali Kechery

== Remakes ==
Film	Language
Idhu Enga Naadu	Tamil
Yeh Desh	Hindi
Eenadu	Telugu

== Awards ==
- Filmfare Award for Best Film - Malayalam won by N.G. John (1982)
