= K. G. Markose =

Indian singer

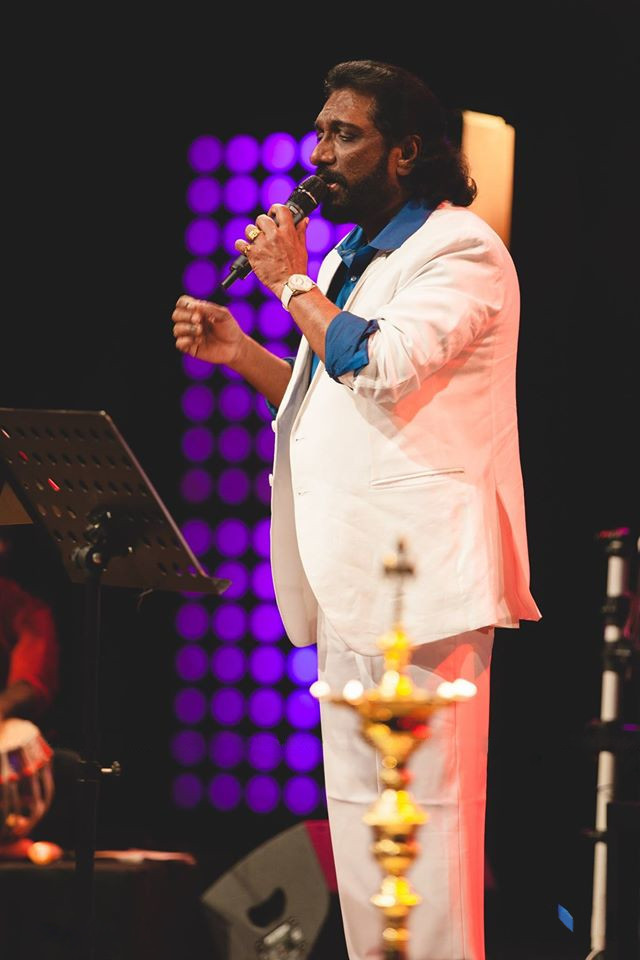
- Born: 10 June 1958 (age 68)
- Occupation: Playback Singer
- Years active: 1979 – present
- Title: Brahmaanda Gaayakan, Sangeetha Chakravarthy
- Spouse: Manju Markose(married 1992)
- Children: Nithin Markose; Nikhil Markose; Namitha Markose
- Awards: The "Order of St.George" from Malankara Orthodox Church, Kerala Film Critics Award, Kerala Catholic Bishop Council Award(KCBC), NANA Award, Drishya Film Awards, Mappila Sangeetha Academy Award, Malayalam Television Viewers Award(MTVA) etc.

K. G. Markose is an Indian playback singer from Kerala. Markose, who is popular for rendering numerous Christian devotional songs, has also sung over 100 film songs during the years 1980's to 2000's. Markose's music career was launched in 1979–1980 with the song "Kannipoomanam" in Balachandra Menon's Kelkkaatha Sabdham. After the success of his debut song, Markose became a regular singer in the "Ganamela" field. He has completed more than 3,000 stage shows in the country, as well as Europe, America, Australia, and gulf nations, among others.

He is an active and devout member of the Malankara Orthodox Syrian Church, originally coming from the Diocese of Niranam as a member of Niranam St. Mary's Orthodox Church according to a statement he made at Chathamattom Carmel Orthodox Church.

== Biography ==
By recording more than 20,000 songs, Markose has earned himself a name in the music industry. He has been singing cinema, light and devotional songs for the past three decades. He has used his potential as a singer to fulfill the listeners' wishes since beginning of his career. Markose has performed in a number of South Indian languages as well as Hindi, for his devotional albums. Markose who met with an accident in Bahrain (for a concert), where his fellow team lost their lives, was lucky enough to survive the incident. However this had a huge impact in his music career since this forced him to take a break from the field for almost five years. Markose who was slowly making a mark in the field was left in shambles after the accident and this led his music career into shades. However, he made a strong comeback with the song "Poomaaname" from the movie Nirakkoottu after which he sang in a number of films starring Mohanlal, Mammootty, Suresh Gopi, Mukesh etc. His song "Manthri Kochamma" from the movie Godfather was a crowd puller at that time. Markose has shown his versatile skills by rendering different "mood" songs.

Markose is fondly called as the "Devagayakan" in the Malayalam music industry for his heart-touching singing in the devotional field. His song 'Israyelin Nadhan' is very famous among the Christians in India and among all the Keralites worldwide. Markose is the leading Christian devotional singer in the Malayalam music industry. He has sung for around 70 films, 4,000 CDs in Malayalam mostly, as well as Telugu, Tamil, Kannada and Arabic. He is also known as the "Sultan of Mappila songs" among the Malayalee Muslims for his divine renderings of Mappillapaatugal during the late '80s and '90s.

He was awarded with the Kerala Catholic Bishop Council Award (KCBC), NANA Audio & Video Award, Mappila Sangeetha Academy Award, the Kerala Film Critics "Prathibha" Award, Malayalam Television Viewers Award (MTVA), "Order of St. George" by Malankara Orthodox Community, and Drishya Film Awards.

== Career ==
Markose began his music career in the period 1979–1980. Since then, he has sung more than 10,000 Christian devotional songs and 5,000 Mappila songs. He also sang over 500 film songs in Malayalam, Tamil, and Telugu languages. He started his playback singing career with the song 'Kannippu Maanam' in the film Kelkatha Shabdam directed by Balachandra Menon. Markose did numerous stage shows in India and abroad. He also sang the hit song 'Poomaaname' from the movie Nirakkoottu. From there he sang many songs in Malayalam films. 'Manthrikochamma Varunnunde' from Godfather, 'Thalolam Poompaithale' from Naadody, 'Puthan Puthu Kaalam' from Kabooliwala are his most popular songs. 'Israyelin Nadhanayi' is his famous Christian devotional song. After 1997, he made a comeback and sang 'Telangana Bommalu' from the 2024 movie Premalu.

== Partial filmography ==
- Kannipoomaanam Kannum Nattu Njaan (1982)
- Jeevikkanaay (1983)
- Unmaadam Ullaasam (1983)
- Kadalilum Karayilum (1983)
- Mayilina Chanchadum (1983)
- Odaruthammava Aalariyam (1984)
- Maanathe Maanikyakkunninmel (1984)
- Aakaashamounam (1984)
- Manassin Aarohanam (1984)
- Prabhaatha Geethangal (1984)
- Nikkaahinu (1984)
- Ashwathi Anuraagini (1984)
- Shyaamam Sundaram (1984)
- Sarathkaala Sandhyakal (1984)
- Monchulla Beevi (1984)
- Ammakkoru Poomutham (1984)
- Ee Meghangaliloorum (1984)
- Ee Shraavana Sandhyayil (1984)
- Onappoomkaattil (1984)
- Kulirmathi Nee Madaalasa (1984)
- Kannil Nilaavu (1985)
- Poovaam Manchalil Moolum Thennale (1985)
- Thattimutti Kaithatti (1985)
- Sankalpam (1985)
- Ponmeghamo (1985)
- Poomaaname (1985)
- Kaattathu Thengola (1985)
- Ponmalayorathu (1985)
- Sree Raagam Paadum Yaamam (1985)
- Kaatte Chundil (1986)
- Poovin Prasaadamenthi (1986)
- Neelakkurinjikal Poothu (1987)
- Vaanidavum (1989)
- Adwaithaamritha Manthram (1989)
- Devike Nin (1989)
- Kaathorthu Nilkum (1989)
- Manthrikkochamma (1991)
- Oru Pooviriyum (1991)
- Kadalezhum Thaandunna (1991)
- Kuyil Paadunna (1991)
- Vrindaavana Geetham (1992)
- Thaalolam (1992)
- Arabikkadhayile (1992)
- Kaattukkuyilin Manassinnullil (1992)
- Aathmaanuthaapathin Manivilakke (1993)
- Puthen Puthukaalam (1994)
- Nertha Palunkin (1993)
- Ayye Ayyayyayyo (1994)
- Manjuruki Pinne Kaanam (1994)
- Parapampam Pamparam Pole (1994)
- Arabikkadhayile (1994)
- Maanikyaveenayumaay (1995)
- Aakaasham (1996)
- Maanam Vilakku Vacheda (1996)
- Enthee Naanam Chollaamo (1996)
- Kalikaala Kootinullil (1997)
- Ellaarum Pokunjo (1997)
- Anaadi Gayakan (1997)
- Poyppoya Baalyam (1997)
- Telangana Bommalu (2024)

== Personal life ==
Markose is married to Manju. They have two sons and a daughter, Dr. Nidhin, Arch. Nikhil, and Adv. Namitha.
