= Lajjaavathi =

- Directed by: G.Prem Kumar
- Written by: Anvar Subair; T. V. Gopalakrishnan (dialogues)
- Screenplay by: Anwar Suber
- Starring: Krishnachandran; Ambika; Baby Sumathi; K. A. Sivadas
- Cinematography: G. Premkumar; G. V. Suresh
- Edited by: K. Sankunni
- Music by: K. J. Joy
- Production company: Chandrika Movies
- Distributed by: Chandrika Movies
- Release date: 9 December 1979
- Country: India
- Language: Malayalam

Lajjaavathi is a 1979 Indian Malayalam film, directed by G. Premkumar. The film stars Krishnachandran, Ambika, Baby Sumathi and K. A. Sivadas in the lead roles. The film has musical score by KJ Joy.

== Cast ==
- Krishnachandran
- Ambika
- Baby Sumathi
- K. A. Sivadas
- Raghavan
- James Stalin
- Stanley
- Kollam G. K. Pillai
- Sreelatha Namboothiri
- Aranmula Ponnamma
- Nellikode Bhaskaran
- Vincent

== Soundtrack ==
The music was composed by K. J. Joy and the lyrics were written by Anwar Suber.

No.	Song	Singers	Length (m:ss)
1	"Mazha Peythu"	P. Susheela, P. Jayachandran	
2	"Swargam Suvarna Swargam"	K. J. Yesudas	
