= Adhwaytham =

- Theatrical-release poster
- Directed by: Priyadarshan
- Written by: T. Damodaran
- Produced by: P. V. Gangadharan
- Starring: Mohanlal; Jayaram; Chithra; Revathi; M. G. Soman
- Cinematography: S. Kumar
- Edited by: N. Gopalakrishnan
- Music by: M. G. Radhakrishnan; Johnson (score)
- Production company: Grihalakshmi Productions
- Distributed by: Kalpaka Release
- Release date: 3 September 1992
- Running time: 181 minutes
- Country: India
- Language: Malayalam

Adhwaytham (lit. 'Non-duality') is a 1992 Indian Malayalam-language political crime thriller film directed by Priyadarshan and written by T. Damodaran. It stars Mohanlal in the lead alongside an ensemble cast of Jayaram, Chithra, Revathi, Innocent, and M. G. Soman. The songs in the film were composed by M. G. Radhakrishnan and the film score was composed by Johnson.

== Plot ==
Swami Amritananda arrives in Kerala on a mission to bring peace at the state, which is burning with communal riots. Swamiji, who is worshiped and respected all over the world, receives death threats from different corners. Lakshmi IAS, the District Collector, is assigned to look after Swamiji's security. She warns Swamiji about the tensed situation and the dangers waiting him outside. The presence of Lakshmi, who had been the lover of Swamiji in his past, brings back old memories to him.

Years ago in the 1960’s, Swami Amritananda was Shivaprasad, the only son of his mother Saraswathy, who had to undergo unpleasant experiences in her home from her own elder brother Sreedharan and brother-in law Krishnan Kutty Menon, a police officer, who was loyal to the government. The Communist party in those days was facing strong restrictions from the government for its anti-state activities. Shivan had always been a headache for his mother, for his rebellious nature. But Lakshmi, Sreedharan's daughter, was in love with him, which was opposed bitterly by Sreedharan and family. Shivan, slowly got involved with the Communist movement and in short time became their political goonda. Shivan gets involved in several petty crimes and thus invites more anger from his uncle Krishnan Kutty Menon. Karthy, a lady party worker with strong naxalite leanings develops a strong passion towards Shivan, but he is unaware of it. Vasu, his close friend since childhood, is a fun loving character, who always saves Shivan from several issues.

Shekharan, the party leader identifies the potential of Shivan and cunningly decides to use it maximum for his own personal benefit. Unaware of the shrewd tactics by Shekharan, Shivan gets involved in several crimes, one after another. One day, Karthy, in order to separate Lakshmi from Shivan, fabricates a story about her relation with him. She succeeds in making Lakshmi believe about her illicit affair with Shivan. Thinking that Shivan was just double dating her, Lakshmi informs police about Shivan's hideout and he is arrested and sentenced for a couple of years. This incident changes Shivan completely. He turns into a hardcore criminal, and develops a hatred towards Lakshmi.

In the late 1970’s, the political scene in the state changes. The Communist Party wins power, and Shivan is released from jail. He is appointed as the chairman of the Temple Devaswom, and Lakshmi is now an IAS officer, who is now holding the post of Devaswom Administrator under Shivan. He tries maximum to belittle her. Shivan, now a corrupt and merciless person, now tries the maximum to loot the temple. The temple staff under Sreekanta Poduval tries to protest, but ends in vain. Vasu is brought into the temple by Shivan, to create a division among the temple staff. Lakshmi tries to convince Vasu, but he expresses loyalty to Shivan, his close friend, without knowing his corrupt ways or political ambitions. Vasu, with in this time falls for the daughter of Thantri Parameshwaran Namboothiri, the head priest of the temple. But she avoids him completely. Vasu, a lower caste by birth, has no chance to win her, who is already engaged to Chitran Namboothiri.

Under the instructions of Shekharan, Shivan steals the sacred ornament and during the investigation the Thantri is arrested for the theft. Shivan's motive behind the plan was to regain Krishnan Kutty's house. Upon being confronted by the Thantri's daughter, Vasu withdraws his statement against the Thantri. Due to the embarrassment he faced after release, the Thantri kills himself.

Vasu soon gains a position in the Devaswom Board, and sides with the common people instead of Shivan during the meetings. Upon realizing that he could be a threat, Shekharan cleverly reveals Vasu's real motives in front of everyone to get him kicked out. On the flip side, he is allowed to stay as he repented his mistakes. Following these incidents, Shivan and Vasu's friendship goes through a rough phase.

Later, Lakshmi learns that Karthy, who was in jail at that point, had made her believe a false story because of the party's agenda. Upon revealing the truth to Shivan, Vasu goes on to fix his relationship with Shivan. Vasu soon confronts Shekharan and threatens to reveal the truth to the cops; soon after he leaves, some goons under the aegis of Pathrose, an accomplice of Shekharan, follow him to finish him off. Upon coming to know about the plans, Shivan hurries to save Vasu. After a showdown with some goons, Shivan learns that Vasu had been killed by Pathrose before his arrival. After Vasu's death, Shivan attempts to take Shekharan's life; instead, the police are called and Shivan is arrested. Meanwhile, Shivan's mother Saraswathy passes away thinking that he killed Vasu. After his mother's death, Shivan leaves his home to live a spiritual life in various temples around the country, thus eventually making him a renowned spiritual cult leader.

Back to the present, Shekharan and his accomplices plan to kill Swami Amritananda in an attempt to save their face. The plan is to kill Swami Amritananda during the "Ratha-Yatra" using a bomb. As soon as Lakshmi learns about the plan through Kaiyathan, a former aide of Shekharan, she does everything in her right to save Swami's life; in the process, she gives her own life to save the Swami.

After Lakshmi's death, Swamiji goes back to Shivan's avatar to seek revenge for everything he lost. Finally, he kills Shekharan, Pathrose, Krishnan Kutty Menon, and all their other accomplices. In the end, Shivan accepts his actions in front of the town and urges them to stay united, instead of being divided.

== Cast ==
- Mohanlal as Swami Amritananda / Shivaprasad / Shivan
  - Vineeth Kumar as young Shivaprasad
- Jayaram as Vasu, Shivan's Childhood Friend
- Revathi as Lakshmi IAS, Shivan's Cousin and Lover
- Soumya as Sreedevi Thampuratti, Vasu's Love Interest
- Chithra as Karthi
- M. G. Soman as Shekharan
- Innocent as DIG Sheshadri Iyer, Corrupt Police Officer and Shekharan's Accomplice
- Janardhanan as Krishnankutty Menon, Corrupt Police Officer, Shivan and Lakshmi's Uncle, and Shekharan's Accomplice
- Srividya as Saraswathy, Shivan's Mother
- Narendra Prasad as Sreekantan Pothuval
- Jagannatha Varma as Sreedhara Menon, Saraswathy's Elder brother and Lakshmi's Father
- Sukumari as Naniyamma, Vasu's Mother
- Thikkurissy Sukumaran Nair as Thantri Parameshwaran Namboothiri, Sreedevi's Father
- Kuthiravattam Pappu as Kaiyathan, Shekharan's Aide
- Maniyanpilla Raju as Chithran Namboothiri
- Captain Raju as Pathrose, Shekharan's Accomplice
- Raghavan as Brahmadathan Namboothirippadu, Shivan's Father
- Sankaradi as Gopalan Pillai, Former State Minister
- Bheeman Raghu as Goonda
- Augustine as Goonda
- Alummoodan as State Minister (voiceover by Dileep)
- Pavithran as Goonda
- Aranmula Ponnamma as Shivan and Lakshmi's grandmother (Sreedharan and Saraswathy's mother)
- Renuka as Krishnankutty Menon's Wife (Sreedharan and Saraswathy's younger sister)
- Kozhikode Narayanan Nair as Pookoya Thangal, an influential Muslim political leader
- Kunjandi as Driver
- K. T. C. Abdullah as Press Reporter

== Production ==
The filming took place in Kozhikode, Kerala. The art director was Sabu Cyril. The film features sequences in temple set, for that they created a temple similar to the Guruvayur Lord Krishnna Temple in Kozhikode.

== Soundtrack ==
Adwaytham

Soundtrack album by M. G. Radhakrishnan
- Released: 19 September 1992
- Recorded: 1991
- Language: Malayalam
- Label: JS Audio
- Producer: P. V. Gangadharan

M. G. Radhakrishnan chronology
Vellanakalude Nadu (1988)	Adwaytham (1992)	Manichitrathazhu (1993)

The song "Ambalappuzhe" is a popular number from the film. It was composed after the lyrics were written. Composition took place at the Woodlands Hotel in Chennai in 1992. Priyadarshan, M. G. Sreekumar, and lyricist Kaithapram Damodaran Namboothiri was also present along with composer Radhakrishnan. They wanted a song relating to temple. Both Priyadarshan and Sreekumar wanted the song to start with the line Ambalappuzha, where Ambalappuzha Sri Krishna Temple is situated. Right after, Kaithapram wrote the first line "Ambalappuzhe Unni Kannanodu Nee" for which Radhakrishnan prepared a tune, this continued for each line after line. Recording took place at the Kothandapani Studio in Chennai, where Sreekumar and K. S. Chithra sang it together. Musical notations were given at 07:00 AM IST in the morning, recording was finished by 01:00 PM. Instruments such as violin and flute were used. The song features Jayaram in the film.

All lyrics are written by Kaithapram Damodaran; all music is composed by M. G. Radhakrishnan.

No.	Title	Artist(s)	Length
1.	"Mazhavilkkothumbil"	M. G. Sreekumar, K. S. Chithra	4:44
2.	"Neelakkuyile Cholloo"	M. G. Sreekumar, Sujatha Mohan	4:24
3.	"Ambalappuzhe"	M. G. Sreekumar, K. S. Chithra	5:10
4.	"Thallikkalayillenkil"	Sujatha Mohan	0:45
5.	"Paavamam Kishna"	M. G. Sreekumar	6:28
6.	"Krishna Krishna"	K. S. Chithra	0:38

== Release ==
Adhwaytham released on 3 September 1992 and became a huge success in box office ran 125 days in kozhikode.

== Awards ==
- Kerala Film Chamber Award for Best Social Criticism Film
