= Deedi Damodaran =

Indian screenwriter

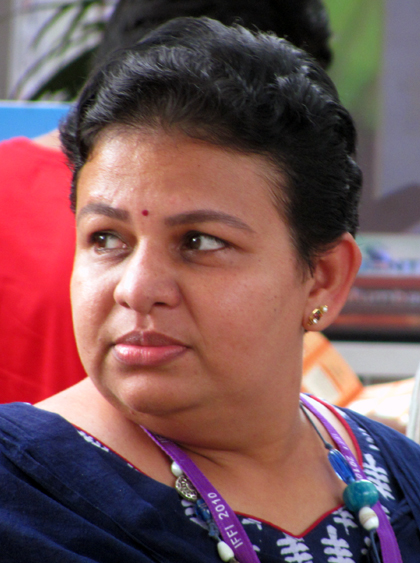
- Born: 6 October 1969 (age 56); Kozhikode, Kerala, India
- Occupation: Screenwriter

Deedi Damodaran is an Indian screenwriter who works in Malayalam cinema. Gulmohar (2008) is her first film in Malayalam directed by Jayaraj, starring Ranjith, Siddique, Augustine, and Neenu Mathew. She is the daughter of the veteran screenwriter of Malayalam cinema T.Damodaran. She is one of the founding members of Women in Cinema Collective, WCC, the organization for the welfare of women workers of Malayalam movie industry.

Filmography

1. Gulmohar (2008)
2. Makal in Kerala kafe (2009)
3. Nayika (2011)
4. John (2023)
