= Arhatha =

- Directed by: I. V. Sasi
- Written by: T. Damodaran
- Screenplay by: T. Damodaran
- Produced by: P. K. R. Pillai
- Starring: Mohanlal; Urvashi; Rekha; Suresh Gopi
- Cinematography: Ramesh Babu
- Edited by: K. Narayanan
- Music by: Shyam
- Production company: Shirdi Sai Creations
- Distributed by: Shirdi Sai Creations
- Release date: 23 August 1990
- Country: India
- Language: Malayalam

Arhatha is a 1990 Indian Malayalam film, directed by I. V. Sasi and produced by P. K. R. Pillai. The film stars Mohanlal, Urvashi, Rekha and Suresh Gopi in the lead roles. The film has musical score by Shyam.

== Plot ==
The story revolves around a chemical factory where Krishnakumar and his son Mahesh rule the factory with the help of all the bad elements in society. They are corrupted politicians including Ex-minister Unnithan, police officers including the commissioner to local criminals led by the notorious Cheku. Devaraj arrives at the scene after he received an offer from the factory where his father, Rtd. captain Ramakrishnan served as the chief security officer and was brutally murdered while on duty.

== Cast ==
- Mohanlal as Devaraj
- Urvashi as Aswathi
- Rekha as Anju
- Suresh Gopi as Mahesh
- Captain Raju as Shekhu
- M. G. Soman as Chandrashekharan Nair
- Lalu Alex as Sethu
- Kuthiravattam Pappu as Nambiar
- Jagathy Sreekumar as Unni Unnithan
- Janardhanan as Krishnakumar
- Sukumari as Devamma
- K. P. Ummer as Sreedharan Unnithan
- K. P. A. C. Sunny as Commissioner Sreenivasan
- Kitty as Factory MD
- Usha as Sindhu
- Unnimary as Ammini
- Thikkurissy Sukumaran Nair as Ashwathi's Grandfather
- Kundara Johny as Achu
- Balan K. Nair as "Udumbu" Nanu
- Bheeman Raghu as Siddique
- Jagannatha Varma as C. K. Ramakrishnan
- Ramu as Mohammad
- Shanavas as Prasad
- Shyama as Devaraj's Sister
- Prathapachandran as Advocate
- Thodupuzha Vasanthi
