= Mahathma =

- Poster
- Directed by: Shaji Kailas
- Written by: T. Damodaran
- Produced by: Vandothra International
- Starring: Suresh Gopi; Biju Menon; Ramya Krishnan; Rajan P. Dev; Devan; Ganesh Kumar
- Cinematography: Dinesh Baboo; Sanjeev Shanker (2nd unit)
- Edited by: L. Bhoominathan
- Music by: Vidyasagar (songs); Rajamani (background score)
- Distributed by: Vandothra Release
- Release date: 15 November 1996
- Running time: 202 minutes
- Country: India
- Language: Malayalam

Mahathma is a 1996 Malayalam-language gangster drama film directed by Shaji Kailas and written by T. Damodaran, which stars Suresh Gopi in the lead role, while Ganesh Kumar, Devan, Rajan P. Dev, Biju Menon and Ramya Krishnan appear in supporting roles.

== Plot ==
Devadevan, an underworld gangster decides to appear in front of Justice Varma Commission, who is holding a probe into the serial blasts that claimed innocent lives. Devadevan's claim of divulging solid evidence of the hands of several top politicians and gangsters in the blasts and communal riots that followed made many of his rivals sleepless. Just on reaching the court premise, he is shot point-blank. Severely wounded, Devan is admitted in ICU, from where his memories travel to his early days of crime.

Past: Devan, a suspect under trial along with his trusted right arm Mustafa is bailed out by Khan Sahib, a smuggler on behalf of David Abraham, a Dubai-based crime boss. Upon release, both Devan and Mustafa are provided safe accommodation at Khan's house, where he meets up with Nancy, the daughter of Khan's second wife in her first marriage and an upcoming movie actress. Nancy falls in love with Devan within a short time. Devan and Mustafa commit several smuggling operations for Khan and slowly rise up in career. Upon realizing that Khan is double-crossing him, David Abraham kills him and appoints Devan as his representative in India.

Devan and Mustafa emerge as undisputed dons in the country. During that time, on a visit to Kerala, Devan meets up with Harikrishnan, his childhood friend undergoing a fast to protest against the appointment of scheduled caste persons as priests in temples as per the reservation policy of the Kerala government. Devan pledges to support Hari, a youth from erstwhile Namboothiri Brahmin feudal family, who is in deep financial crisis. Hari is appointed as the second-in-command of Devan, who upon Devan's advice gives up his Yajnopaveetham. James Kutty, a drug smuggler along with Reddiar tries all ways to finish up Devan's empire, but to no avail.

In retaliation, Hari kills central minister and Reddiar's son Baba Rahim. Reddiar and James forms a league to finish off Devan. David Abraham, who was now losing turf to Devan too joins them and provides explosives and ammunition required to create a severe blast along with a communal riot that could deviate public attention from the series of corruption allegations against his men in power, including Baba Rahim. In the meantime, Mustafa falls in love with Saraswati, Hari's younger sister, who objects to her sister's love towards a Muslim. Hari is shocked to find that Mustafa is supported by Devan and splits ways with him.

Hari is allured by James and is used effectively to transport explosives into the city. The serial blasts breaks down Devan, who is shocked to find that his name is dragged effectively by David Abraham and gang. Mustafa is killed by James, where Devan finishes off David Abraham and James. Devan travels to appear in front of Justice Varma Commission, and was shot point-blank by Hari.

Present: Upon discharge from ICU, Devan is transferred to a ward where Justice Varma meets him, who plays a double game and successfully removes the bullets from Devan's pistol. Just minutes after the exit of Varma, Hari enters his ward and tries to shoot him up, but Devan successfully escapes. While following, Devan and Hari get into a car, but the cabbie was Koshy, Devan's attorney, who locks the car from outside, in which a bomb was planted. Using his remote control, Devan blows up the car, thus killing Hari.

== Cast ==
- Suresh Gopi as Devadevan
  - Biyon as Young Devadevan
- Biju Menon as Mustafa
- Ramya Krishnan as Nancy
- Ganesh Kumar as Harikrishnan
- Devayani as Saraswathi
- Kitty as David Abraham
- Rajan P. Dev as Khan Sahib
- Maniyan Pillai Raju as Attorney Koshy
- Devan as James Kutty
- N. F. Varghese as Baba Rahim
- Major Sundarrajan as Justice Varma
- Sadiq as Sukumaran
- Karamana Janardanan Nair as Ramakrishna Kurup
- Sahadevan as Reddiar
- Appahaja as Suresh, a reporter
- C. I. Paul as DYSP Madhavan Nair
- Kollam Thulasi as Mukundan Pillai, a minister
- Kozhikode Narayanan Nair
- Krishnakumar as Rajeev
- Mahesh as Venu
- Jose Pellissery as C.M. Sukumaran Varma
- Thikkurissy Sukumaran Nair as Valiya Thirumeni
- Vimal Raj as Satish Shetty
- Azeez as Jailor Santhosh
- Usharani as Alice, Nancy's Mother
- Renuka as Ramakrishna Kurup's daughter

== Music ==
The soundtrack of the film was composed by Vidyasagar and written by Kaithapram Damodaran Namboothiri & Ilakkiyan.

Track	Song title	Singer(s)	Lyrics	Length
1	"Brahma"	Swarnalatha	Ilakkiyan	04:24
2	"Dhyaaye Nithyam"	Satheesh Babu	Traditional	03:49
3	"Pullorkudavum"	M.G. Sreekumar	Kaithapram Damodaran Namboothiri	05:36
4	"Raavirulum"	K.J. Yesudas	Kaithapram Damodaran Namboothiri	04:20

== Reception ==
Mahathma was declared as an average venture at the box office compared to past blockbuster hits of Suresh Gopi-Shaji Kailas.

== Trivia ==
- The film uses the song Money, Money, Money by Abba to depict Devadevan's transformation as a dreaded gangster.
