= Krishnachandran =

Indian Malayalam actor and playback singer

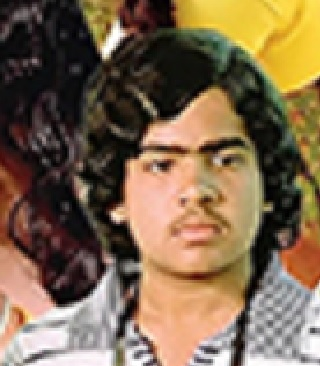
- Born: 16 June 1960 (age 66); Nilambur, Kozhikode district (Now Malappuram district), Kerala, India
- Occupations: Actor, playback singer
- Years active: 1978–present
- Spouse: Vanitha Krishnachandran (1986–present)
- Children: Amrithavarshini K. C.
- Parent(s): P. Narayana Raja, Nalini N. Raja

T. N. Krishnachandran (born 16 June 1960) is an Indian actor, playback singer, and dubbing artist in Malayalam cinema and television.

== Career ==
His debut movie was Rathinirvedam in 1978. He was the voice for actor Vineeth and Rahman and also for Kunchacko Boban in Aniyathi Pravu. He won best dubbing artiste Kerala State Award for Kabuliwala (Vineeth) and Aniyathi Pravu (Kunchacko Boban). He acted in approximately 30 Malayalam movies and sang almost 1000 songs in Malayalam and Tamil movies, including many songs for Ilaiyaraaja in Tamil movies. Music director Ilaiyaraaja introduced him to the Tamil film industry in Kozhi Koovuthu.

== Personal life ==
Krishnachandran was born as the elder of two children of P. Narayana Raja and Nalini Raja of Nilambur Kovilakam Nilambur, Malappuram district (Then in Kozhikode district) on 16 June 1960. He has a younger sister named Meera. He had his primary education from GMHS, Nilambur. He pursued a bachelor's degree in Music with first rank from Calicut University from Government College Chittur, Palakkad. He holds an M.A. in Music at Madras University.

He married South Indian actress Vanitha Krishnachandran on 11 May 1986 at Mookambika Temple, Kollur, after a brief spell of dating. They have a daughter named Amritavarshini, born in 1990. They lived at Chennai from 1986 till 2005. They are currently settled at Thiruvananthapuram. His daughter was married in 2016 to Navneet and is currently settled in Canada.

== Awards ==
- 1994: Kerala State Film Award for Best Dubbing Artist - Kabooliwala for Vineeth
- 1997: Kerala State Film Award for Best Dubbing Artist - Aniyathi Pravu for Kunchacko Boban

== Television ==
TV serials

- Parvathy (Surya TV)
- Ayirathil Oruval (Mazhavil Manorama)
- Chempattu (Asianet)
- Bhadra (Surya TV)
- Aanpirannol (Amrita TV)
- Ennum Sammatham (Mazhavil Manorama)
- Mazhayethum Munpey (Amrita TV)
- Swayamvarapanthal (Surya TV)

As Host

- Swarasangamam (ACV)
- Swarnachamaram (Amrita TV)
- Suvarnageetham (Mathrbhoomi)

As Judge

- Sreshtabharatham (Amrita TV)

== Filmography ==
=== As an actor ===
Year	Title	Role	Notes
1978	Rathinirvedam	Pappu	
1978	Rappadikalude Gatha		
1979	Koumaarapraayam	Joy	
1979	Raathrikal Ninakku Vendi		
1979	Lovely		
1979	Lajjaavathi		
1980	Sakthi	A Blind Person	
1980	Kaantha Valayam	Lional Hans	
1982	Ee Nadu	Sasi	
1982	Vidhichathum Kothichathum	Kasthoori	
1982	Ormakkayi	Krishnan	
1982	Irattimadhuram	Ramu	
1983	Belt Mathai	Khadir Kutty	
1984	Unaroo		
1984	Sandhyakkenthinu Sindooram		
1985	Thozhil Allengil Jail		
1986	Yuvajanotsavam	Omanakuttan	
2009	Orkkuka Vallappozhum		
2013	Ravu		
2013	Omega.exe		
2013	Artist	Gayatri's father	
2015	Rockstar	Vakkachan	
2018	Naam	Sreedharan Warrier	
2019	Chilappol Penkutty		
2022	Aanandam Paramanandam		
2024	Varshangalkku Shesham		

=== As dubbing artist ===
- Johnnie Walker - voice for Jeet Upendra
- Five Star Hospital - voice for Vishnu
- Rathilayam - voice for Rajkumar
- Chevalier Michael - voice for Anand Babu
- Ishtamanu Nooru Vattam - voice for Shiju
- Naalamkettile Nalla Thampimar - voice for Vignesh
- Indraprastham - voice for Akshay Anand
- Rangam - voice for Ravindran
- Aniyathipravu - voice for Kunchacko Boban
- Sargam - voice for Vineeth
- Parinayam - voice for Vineeth
- Highway - voice for Vineeth
- Rithubhedam - voice for Vineeth
- Kabooliwala - voice for Vineeth
- Kamaladalam - voice for Vineeth
- Ennennum Kannettante - voice for Sangeeth (hero)
- Layanam - Voice for Nandhu (hero)
- Kerala House Udan Vilpanakku - voice for Jayasurya
- Perumthachan - voice for Prashanth
- Poonilamazha - voice for Sanjay Mitra
- Oru Vadakkan Veeragatha - voice for Sanjay Mitra
- Vaisali - voice for Sanjay Mitra
- Mazhavilkoodaram - voice for Rahman
- Aparatha - voice for Rahman
- Charithram - voice for Rahman
- Kariyilakkattu Pole - voice for Rahman
- Ee Thanalil Ithiri Nerum - voice for Rahman
- Katha Ithuvare - voice for Rahman
- King Soloman - voice for Rahman
- Ivide Ee Theerathu - voice for Rahman
- Kanamarayathu - voice for Rahman
- Indriyam - voice for Vikram
- Mayoora Nritham - voice for Vikram
- Mafiya - voice for Vikram
- Itha Oru Snehagatha - voice for Vikram
- Summer Palace - voice for Ancil
- Chilambu - voice for Rahman
- Kannezhuthi Pottum Thottu - voice for Abbas
- Pranayamanithooval - voice for Vineeth Kumar

=== As a playback singer ===
==== Malayalam songs ====
1. "Aruthe Aruthe Enne Thallaruthe"... Maniyan Pilla Adhava Maniyan Pilla (1981)
2. "Maarolsavam"... Aa Raathri (1982)
3. "Vellichillum Vithari"... Ina (1982)
4. "Aralipoonkaadukal"... Ina (1982)
5. "Kinaavinte Varambathu"... Ina (1982)
6. "Thattedi Sosamme"... Ee Nadu (1982)
7. "Aakashagangayil Varnangalaal" [D]... Sindoora Sandhyakku Mounam (1982)
8. "Manjumma Vekkum"... Idavela (1982)
9. "Happy Christhmas"... Ormakkayi (1982)
10. "Thanka Thanki Thaithaaro"... Aaroodham (1983)
11. "Orajnjaatha Pushpam Vidarnnu"... Paalam (1983)
12. "Vellitheril"... Engine Nee Marakkum (1983)
13. "Romeo Juliet"... Engine Nee Marakkum (1983)
14. "Brahmaswaroopini Devi"... Deepaaradhana (1983)
15. "Pokkerikkante Chukkukaappi" [Aaluva Chanthayilu]... Belt Mathai (1983)
16. "Swarga Vaathil Thurannu Thannu"... Iniyenkilum (1983)
17. "Pranaya Swaram Hrudaya Swaram"... Naanayam (1983)
18. "Jhil Jhil Jhillennu"... Kaikeyi (1983)
19. "Manjum Kulirum"... Sandhyaykku Virinja Poovu (1983)
20. "Kaatte Kaatte"... Oomakkuyil (1983)
21. "Olangalilulayum"... Sandhyamayangum Neram (1983)
22. "Never On A Sunday"... America America (1983)
23. "Kadhaparayaam"... Aadhipathyam (1983)
24. "Sougandhikangal Vidarnnu"... Mahaabali (1983)
25. "Manjaadikutti Malavedathi"... Ee Yugam (1983)
26. "Jeevane"... Snehabandham (1983)
27. "Thaarunyam Neeraadi"... Raagasangamam (1983)
28. "Roopam Madhuritharoopam"... Makale Maappu Tharoo (1984)
29. "Swapnangal Inacherum"... Nishedhi (1984)
30. "Kalyaanam Kalyaanam"... Oru Kochu Kadha Aarum Parayatha Kadha (1984)
31. "Kasthoorimaan"... Kaanaamarayathu (1984)
32. "Alliyilam Poovo"... Mangalam Nerunnu (1984)
33. "Peda Peda"... Chemmeenkettu (1984)
34. "Innente Khalbile"... KoottinilamKili (1984)
35. "Pattiche Pattiche" (Kettiyone)... Kadamattathachan (1984)
36. "Kuppinipattaalam"... Onnaanu Nammal (1984)
37. "Kaikalkottippaaduka"... Piriyilla Naam (1984)
38. "Raajave Raajave"... Ithaa Innu Muthal (1984)
39. "Naalukaashum Kayyil Vechu"... Chakkarayumma (1984)
40. "Nammude Ee College"... Paavam Poornima (1984)
41. "Deepame"... Unaroo (1984)
42. "Shivamkari Sadaa"... Sandhyaykkenthinu Sindooram (1984)
43. "Aadi Brahmamunarnnu"... Ezhu Swarangal (1984)
44. "Mounam Pallaviyam"... Ezhu Swarangal (1984)
45. "Devadoothar Paadi"... Kaathodu Kaathoram (1985)
46. "Sangamam Ee Poonkaavanam"... Koodum Thedi (1985)
47. "Penne Nin Premathin"... Soundaryappinakkam (1985)
48. "Ayyayyo Ammavi"... Muhoortham 11:30 (1985)
49. "Poovaam Manchalil Moolum Thennale"... Eeran Sandhya (1985)
50. "Panchaara Panchaayathil"... Nerariyum Nerathu (1985)
51. "Kopam Kollumbol"... Ithu Nalla Thamaasha (1985)
52. "Malaraayennum"... Guerilla (1985)
53. "Maathala Mottu"... Ezhumuthal Onpathuvare (1985)
54. "Kuthira Pole"... Muthaaramkunnu P.O. (1985)
55. "Karimbin Poovinakkare"... Karimbinpoovinakkare (1985)
56. "Onnaam Thumbi"... Makan Ente Makan (1985)
57. "Cherunnu Njangalonnaay"... Kadha Ithuvare (1985)
58. "Tak Tak Tak"... Avidatheppole Ivideyum (1985)
59. "Pokaathe Pokaathe"... Angaadikkappurathu (1985)
60. "Azhakinoraaraadhana"... Angaadikkappurathu (1985)
61. "Manjin Kulirala"... Chorakku Chora (1985)
62. "Vanashree Mukham"... Rangam (1985)
63. "Aaraarum Ariyaathe"... Rangam (1985)
64. "Thamburaan Paattinu"... Rangam (1985)
65. "Kaaveriyaaril"... Black Mail (1985)
66. "Ponmarakkuda Choodi"... Manaykkale Thatha (1985)
67. "Premalekhanam"... Priye Priyadarshini (1985)
68. "Ee Aanandam"... Ore Raktham (1985)
69. "Ravi Kandathellaam"... Ore Raktham (1985)
70. "Thenaari Thenkaashi"... Adiverukal (1986)
71. "Nilaavala Thalirkkudil"... Kulambadikal (1986)
72. "Romapuriyle"... Annoru Raavil (1986)
73. "My Name Is Mikki"... Annoru Raavil (1986)
74. "Kadalilaki Karayodu Cholli"... Pranaamam (1986)
75. "Oru Diamond Rani"... Priyamvadakkoru Pranayageetham (1986)
76. "Porinu Poru"... Priyamvadakkoru Pranayageetham (1986)
77. "Pralayapayodhi"... Yuvajanolsavam (1986)
78. "Ambalamukku Kazhinjal"... Yuvajanolsavam (1986)
79. "Oh Sugandha Vanapushpangal"... Pidikittappulli (Kaanan Pokunna Pooram) (1986)
80. "Kandu Njan Kandu"... Malarum Kiliyum (1986)
81. "Mohamaakum Naagangal"... Karinaagam (1986)
82. "Malarmaari Madhumaari"... Bhagavaan (1986)
83. "Ullam Thulli"... Ennu Naadhante Nimmi (1986)
84. "Medakkonnaykku"... Abhayam Thedi (1986)
85. "Swarnathaalam"... Chila Nimishangalil (1986)
86. "Velli Meeshakkaara"... Prathikalethedi (1986)
87. "Yaamam Madabharam"... Ahalya (1986)
88. "Aalolam"... Avalude Kadha (1987)
89. "Kanmaniye"... Oru Minna Minunginte Nurungu Vettam (1987)
90. "Madhumozhi"... Oru Minna Minunginte Nurungu Vettam (1987)
91. "Mele Nandanam Poothe"... Neelakkurinji Poothappol (1987)
92. "Moham Nee"... Kurukkan Raajaavaayi (1987)
93. "Muthukkudangale" [Vellinilaavoru]... Naalkkavala (1987)
94. "Aadaam Namukku Paadaam"... Aalippazhangal (1987)
95. "Naadodumbol Naduve"... P.C. 369 (1987)
96. "Innee Naadin Raajaavu"... Oru Sindoorapottinte Ormakku (1987)
97. "Madhumadhuram"... Ithrayum Kaalam (1987)
98. "Mannaanithu"... Ithrayum Kaalam (1987)
99. "Pranayavenuvil Ethethu Swaramo"... Swaralayam (1987)
100. "Chirichu Chirichu"... Swaralayam (1987)
101. "Kaanunnu Ningalee Kaalathin Vaibhavam... Abkaari (1988)
102. "Thenmazhayo"... Daisy (1988)
103. "Snehamithallo Bhoovileeshan"... Aadyapaapam (1988)
104. "Poomozhi Sakhi Nin"... Rahasyam Paramarahasyam (1988)
105. "Oh Sugandha Vanapushpangal"... Janmashathru (1988)
106. "Julie My Love"... Samhaaram (1988)
107. "Nithya Raagini"... Samhaaram (1988)
108. "Chumbikkaan"... Samhaaram (1988)
109. "Kandittilla Njaan" [Chandanathin Gandhamarinju]... Chakkikkotha Chankaran (1989)
110. "Odaathe Maane" [Panthu]... Chakkikkotha Chankaran (1989)
111. "Neru Neru"... Varnam (1989)
112. "Nadiyorathile"... Naaduvaazhikal (1989)
113. "Nilkku Nee"... Kalpana House (1989)
114. "Puthiya Bhoomiyil Puthiya Veedhiyil"... Lillyppookkal Chuvannappol (1989)
115. "Vaathapi Ganapathim Bhaje"... Lillyppookkal Chuvannappol (1989)
116. "Aarari Raarariro"... Mizhiyorangalil (1989)
117. "Karnikaaram Pookkum" [Hamsame Nee – Bit]... Mizhiyorangalil (1989)
118. "Madhuvaani"... Mizhiyorangalil (1989)
119. "Kaanan Njaanoru"... Thaalam (1990)
120. "Kallolam"... Chuvanna Kannukal (1990)
121. "Hridayavaniyil"... 101 Raavukal (1990)
122. "Thaanaaro"... Kaakkathollaayiram (1991)
123. "Mele Chandrika"... Bhoomika (1991)
124. "Nirakkudukka"... Kankettu (1991)
125. "Nakshathram Minnunna"... Mimics Parade (1991)
126. "Pookkadambilithirikkudanna Neetti Odi Vannu"... Arangu (1991)
127. "Premam Aadyathe"... Teenage Love (1991)
128. "Thalamele Randambili"... Naattuvisesham (1991)
129. "Kanakathaarame"... Nagarathil Samsaaravishayam (1991)
130. "Naavum Neeti Virunnu"... Cheppukilukkana Changaathi (1991)
131. "Thamberin Thaalam"... Thalasthaanam (1992)
132. "Ragam Thaanam"... Sooryagaayathri (1992)
133. "Pinneyum Paadiyo"... Kallanum Policum (1992)
134. "Bhaagyam Vannu"... Chevalier Michael (1992)
135. "Kannaadikkaavilile"... Chevalier Michael (1992)
136. "Mele Mele"... Mahaanagaram (1992)
137. "Neelakurukkan"... Kaasargode Khaadarbhai (1992)
138. "Maanathe Veettil"... Maanthrikacheppu (1992)
139. "Chakravarthini"... Ambathu Lakshavum Maruthi Kaarum (1992)
140. "Thappu Tatti"... Sthalathe Pradhaana Payyans (1993)
141. "Panineerppoovin Naanam"... Ghoshayaathra (1993)
142. "Mungi Mungi Muthupongi"... Jackpot (1993)
143. "I Love"... Gaandeevam (1994)
144. "Aararivum"... CID Unnikrishnan B.A. BEd (1994)
145. "Baggy Jeansum"... Sainyam (1994)
146. "Nenchil Idanenchil"... Sainyam (1994)
147. "Panchaarappaattum" [D]... Tharavaadu (Chathurvarnyam) (1994)
148. "Melevaanam"... Kadalpponnu (1994)
149. "Pasumpon"... Thamarai Poovukum (1995)
150. "Oru Vellithaambalam"... Puthukkottayile Puthumanavaalan (1995)
151. "Kaalam Kalikaalam"... Malayala Maasam Chingam Onninu (1996)
152. "Ragam Paadi"... Hamsageetham (1996)
153. "Shankholi Doore"... Hamsageetham (1996)
154. "Theyyaare"... Anubhoothi (1997)
155. "Dhinna Dhinna"... Gangothri (1997)
156. "Thappum Kottaathappaani"... Kudamaattam (1997)
157. "Nercha Kunkuma"... Mannaadiyaar Penninu Chenkotta Chekkan (1997)
158. "Mindanda Mindanda"... Vaachalam (1997)
159. "Kuttaalam Aruviyile"... Over To Delhi (1997)
160. "Varnatheril Vannu Vasantham"... Neelaanjanam (1998)
161. "Thaalolam Paadan"... Aanamuttathe Aangalamar (Manayoorile Manikyam) (2000)
162. "Kaliyaattam Thullalle"... Daivathinte Makan (2000)
163. "Mannil Ningal"... Agniyasthram (1985)
164. "O Marimaayan Kaviyalle"... Ivan Megharoopan (2012)

==== Tamil songs ====
1. Edho Mogam - Kozhi Koovuthu (1982)
2. Pudichalum Pudichen - Gopurangal Saivathillai (1982)
3. Poovaadai Kaatru - Gopurangal Saivathillai (1982)
4. Thendral Ennai - Oru Odai Nadhiyagirathu (1983)
5. Thamarai Poovukkum - Pasumpon (1995)
6. Ponnanathu - Aasai Thambi (1998)
