= Raju Mathew =

Indian film producer (c.1937–2019)

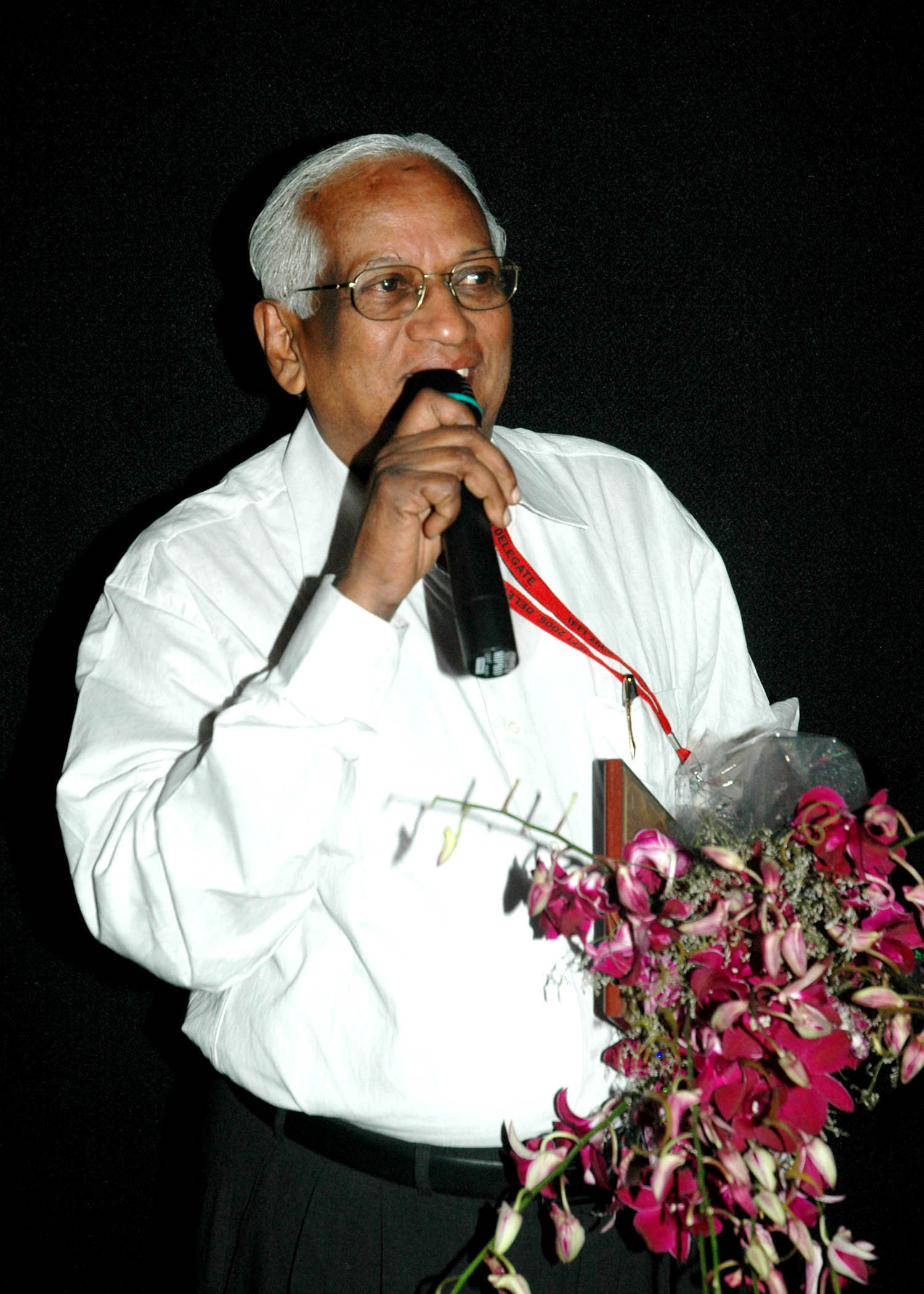
- Raju Mathew, IFFI (2006)
- Born: c. 1937
- Died: 12 November 2019 (aged 82)
- Occupation: Film Producer

Raju Mathew (c. 1937 – 12 November 2019) was an Indian film producer from Kerala. He produced 45 films. He was the owner of Century Films.

== Biography ==
Mathew worked in an insurance company before coming to the film arena. Later he gave up the job and established Century Films in 1979. Then he began to produce films. He produced mainly Malayalam films. Besides Malayalam films he also produced a Hindi film titled Anokha Rishta. Athiran was the last film which was produced by him. He was the president of the Kerala Film Chamber of Commerce.

Mathew was married to Lily Mathew. Anjana Jacob and Ranjana Mathew are their daughters.

Mathew died on 12 November 2019 at the age of 82.

== Selected filmography ==
=== Malayalam ===
- Kelkkaatha Sabdham (1982)
- Karyam Nissaram (1983)
- Pinnilavu (1983)
- Sandhyakku Virinja Poovu (1983)
- Athirathram (1984)
- Adiyozhukkukal (1984)
- Aalkkoottathil Thaniye (1984)
- Ariyatha Veethikal (1984)
- Sreekrishna Parunthu (1984)
- Avidathe Pole Ivideyum (1985)
- Karimpinpoovinakkare (1985)
- Anubandham (1985)
- Namukku Paarkan Munthiri Thoppukal (1986)
- Adimakal Udamakal (1987)
- Vrutham (1987)
- Mukthi (1988)
- Aryan (1988)
- Shubhayathra (1990)
- Aanaval Mothiram (1991)
- Samooham (1993)
- Puthran (1994)
- Thanmathra (2005)
- Money Ratnam (2014)
- Athiran (2019)

=== Hindi ===
- Anokha Rishta (1986)

== Awards ==
- 2005 - National Film Award for Best Feature Film in Malayalam (producer) - Thanmathra
- 2005 - Kerala State Film Award for Best Film (producer) - Thanmathra
- 2005 - Amrita TV Film Award for Best Film (producer) - Thanmathra
- 1985 - Filmfare Award for Best Film – Malayalam for Aalkkoottathil Thaniye
