= Kabooliwala =

- Theatrical release poster
- Directed by: Siddique-Lal
- Written by: Siddique-Lal
- Produced by: Sabeena K. Azeez
- Starring: Innocent; Jagathy Sreekumar
- Cinematography: Anandakuttan
- Edited by: T. R. Shekhar; Gourishankar K. R.
- Music by: S. P. Venkitesh
- Production company: Kavya Chandrika
- Distributed by: Swargachitra
- Release date: 25 March 1994
- Country: India
- Language: Malayalam

Kabooliwala is a 1994 Indian Malayalam-language coming of age comedy drama film, written and directed by Siddique-Lal, starring Innocent and Jagathy Sreekumar.

== Plot ==
The story begins in Delhi. Unni is the four-year-old son of a Doctor and Sridevi. Unni has two elder sisters. On Unni's fourth birthday the Doctor is late for the celebration; but he gives Unni a bugle which he likes very much. The same night while they were celebrating Unni's birthday, a Kabooli named Ameer comes to the doctor with a child who is suffering from fever. The doctor does not treat the child but asks him to take the child to hospital. He receives a call at midnight that Ameer's son is in critical condition. The doctor rushes to the hospital with his son. Unni is very much attached to the music played by Ameer. Ameer's son Munna dies in the hospital and he kidnaps Unni and flees from Delhi.

20 years later, the story shifts to Kerala. Kannaas and Kadalaas, are litter pickers. They stay with Amminiamma and they are in love with her daughters; Chandrika and Ramani. Chandrika steals some valuables from the house where she works as a maid. In order to save them, Kannaas and Kadalaas go to prison. When they return, they find both Chadrika and Ramani are married and move out of the house with sorrow.

Munna comes in search of Kannaas and Kadalaas because they went to prison for stealing the bugle. Kannaas and Kadalaas have buried the bugle in a ground and now there is a circus tent around it. While trying to take the bugle out, it is taken by Laila, the daughter of the circus owner. Munna asks for the bugle and she refuses to give it. They fight with each other for the bugle and in the process Munna tries to prove that Laila is having an illicit relation with him. Her father Sahib is furious to know this and he tries to kill Munna. But before that, Munna tells him that he did all this for his bugle and he has no relation with his daughter. Sahib asks Laila to return the bugle.

Munna plays the same music which the Kabooli used to play after getting the bugle. All in the circus tent are shocked to hear it and it is revealed that Munna is Sahib's nephew. All in the circus tent accept him wholeheartedly. Munna ignores Laila and she tries to commit suicide. Munna confesses his love for her. While romancing he plays the same music and the doctor who was passing by hears it and he comes with his daughters and sons-in-law and they forcefully take him. Munna tries to leave, but is given sedation and put to sleep. One of the sons-in-law is a police officer and the other is a doctor and they are able to arrest Sahib who comes to release Munna. The doctor shows the photograph of dead Munna and the newspaper articles reporting the kidnap of Unni to the people in the circus tent. Sahib is released under the condition that they would leave the city within 48 hours. Sahib is also furious and says that he will marry off his daughter within 48 hours and his son would curse him for being his father. Kannas and Kadalas come to Munna's house and Sridevi stops them. She requests Kannas and Kadalas not to take her son back to the streets. Kannas and Kadalas reveal about the love between Munna and Laila and also tell Sridevi that Munna would be happy only with Laila. The doctor also decides to leave the city the next morning. Munna sees the door of his bedroom opened. He is successful in getting out of the house through the back door but is shocked to see Sridevi there. She tells him that she was the one who opened all doors for him because she couldn't see him sad. She asks him to run with his Laila. The mother blesses her son and he leaves. But when he reaches the circus tent he is badly beaten up by Sahib and party. Laila is not allowed to leave. Kannas and Kadalas take Munna from there and they help Laila run away with Munna. But Sahib finds them. He tries to kill Munna but couldn't. Six months later Kannas and Kadalas are released from prison and the other street boys tell them that Laila and Munna are getting married that day and all are invited for the marriage.

When Kannas and Kadalas and their gang reach for the marriage, they are stopped at the gate. When they try to reach Munna; they are stopped by his relatives. Kannas and Kadalas bid a tearful farewell to Munna telling her that their place is in the streets and they leave. While leaving, they leave a gift with the watchman for Munna. Munna's brothers-in-law stops the watchman and opens the gift and finds it is the same bugle. They throw the bugle away and it falls in front of Kannas and Kadalas. They take the bugle and are sad for a moment. The next moment they put the bugle in their bag where they put waste materials and leave the place.

== Cast ==
- Innocent as Kannaas
- Jagathy Sreekumar as Kadalaas
- Vineeth as Munna/Unni
- Charmila as Laila
- M. G. Soman as Unni's Father
- Srividya as Sridevi, Unni's mother
- Captain Raju as Sahib, Laila's father
- Zeenath as Laila's mother
- Nedumudi Venu as Ameer
- Sukumari as Amminiamma
- Kalpana as Chandrika
- Bindu Panicker as Ramani
- Sankaradi as Nayarettan (Teashop Owner)
- Janardhanan as Minnal Thomachan
- Machan Varghese (debut)
- Kundara Johny as Unni's brother-in-Law
- Riza Bava as Unni's brother-in-Law
- Geetha Vijayan as Geetha
- Suma Jayaram as Raji
- Manju Satheesh as Dancer in Circus
- Soubin Shahir as a boy

== Music ==
Kabooliwala

Soundtrack album by S. P. Venkitesh and Bichu Thirumala
- Released: 1993
- Recorded: A. V. M. Studios
- Genre: Film soundtrack
- Label: Sargam Audios

No.	Title	Artist(s)	Length
1.	"Kaboolivala Naadoodi"	K. J. Yesudas
2.	"Kaboolivala Naadoodi"	Sujatha Mohan
3.	"Muthamittaneram"	M. G. Sreekumar, K. S. Chithra
4.	"Paalnilaavinum"	K. J. Yesudas, Choir
5.	"Paalnilaavinum" (Bit)	K. J. Yesudas
6.	"Pirannoree Mannum"	Malaysia Vasudevan
7.	"Puthen Puthukaalam"	K. G. Markose, K. S. Chithra, Choir
8.	"Puthen Puthukaalam"	M. G. Sreekumar
9.	"Thennal Vannathum"	K. S. Chithra

== Reception ==
Kabooliwala was a major commercial success. It became the first film to run for 50 days in all 24 release centers and to create collection records in 18 of them. As the actor Jagathy Sreekumar quotes "The producer of the movie was literally shocked because of the financial success."
