= Itha Oru Snehagatha =

1997 film by Captain Raju

- Poster
- Directed by: Captain Raju
- Produced by: Varghese Kurian
- Starring: Vikram; Laila
- Cinematography: Anandakuttan
- Music by: Johnson
- Production company: Appus International
- Release date: 18 January 1997
- Running time: 135 mins
- Country: India
- Language: Malayalam

Itha Oru Snehagatha (transl. Here is a love story) is a 1997 Indian Malayalam-language romance film, written and directed by Captain Raju. The film stars Vikram and Laila in the leading roles. It was dubbed and released in Tamil as Thrill in May 2002, shortly after the success of Dhill, in which Vikram and Laila had featured.

== Plot ==
Church Father Daniel is appointed as the junior priest of the town church and subsequently tries to unite the warring population of Hindus and Christians in the town. The Christians are led by Kariyachan and Mathayichan, while the Hindus from the town are led by Raman Nair. Father Daniel forms a music troupe called "Rhythm Orchestra" along with the cross-religion lovers Roy and Hema, trying to unite them. Meanwhile, Father Daniel faces stiff opposition from various quarters.

== Cast ==
- Vikram as Roy
- Laila as Hema
- Captain Raju as Father Daniel
- K. P. A. C. Sunny as Kariyachan
- Rajan P. Dev as Mathayichan
- Kollam Thulasi as Raman Nair
- Nedumudi Venu
- Thilakan
- N. F. Varghese as Kapyaru (Roy's father)
- Jagannatha Varma
- J. V. Somayajulu as Hema's grandfather
- Kaviyoor Ponnamma as Daniel's mother

Tamil version

- Manivannan as the fake priest
- Kadhal Sukumar as the fake priest's assistant
- J. Livingston as Police Inspector
- Indhu as Hema's sister

== Soundtrack ==
Itha Oru Snehagatha

Soundtrack album by Johnson
- Genre: Feature film soundtrack
- Language: Deva
- Producer: Johnson

The soundtrack album is composed by Johnson. Lyrics were penned by Kaithapram. The songs are sung by K. S. Chitra, Biju Narayanan, Sindhu, K. J. Yesudas and Sangeetha Sajith.

Track list (Malayalam)
No.	Title	Singer(s)	Length
1.	"Indraneela Ravu"	K. S. Chitra, Biju Narayanan
2.	"Karunamayee - Female"	Sangeetha Sajith
3.	"Karunamayee - Male"	K. J. Yesudas
4.	"Sarigapa"	Sindhu
5.	"Thaarakangal - Female"	Sangeetha Sajith
6.	"Thaarakangal - Male"	K. J. Yesudas
7.	"Vachaname"	Sangeetha Sajith

The Tamil version had a new set of songs composed by Deva.

Track list (Tamil version)
No.	Title	Singer(s)	Length
1.	"Enathu Nenjil"	P. Unnikrishnan, Ganga
2.	"Nenjangal"	P. Unnikrishnan
3.	"Oonjal Pola"	Deva
4.	"Vidu Vidu"	A. R. Reihana, Anuradha Sriram
5.	"Dhilluku Jodiya"	Mohammed Beer
6.	"Thaarakangal"	Sangeetha Sajith
7.	"Karunaamayee"	Sangeetha Sajith

== Release ==
In 2002, following the success of the Vikram-Laila starrer Dhill (2001), Golden Cine Creations chose to dub the film into Tamil and release it to make the most of Vikram's rising popularity. When enquired about his opinion on his old films being dubbed and re-released, Vikram revealed that he had no problem as such films had given him work during the struggling phase of his career. A song with lyrics featuring the titles of Vikram's other films was prepared for the Tamil version.
