= T. Damodaran =

Indian screenwriter

- Damodaran in 2010
- Born: 15 October 1935; Calicut, India
- Died: 28 March 2012 (aged 76); Kozhikode, Kerala, India
- Occupation: Screenwriter
- Years active: 1975–2012
- Spouse: Pushpa (m. 1968; died 2011)
- Children: Deedi Damodaran; Simna Damodaran; Rashmi Damodaran

T. Damodaran (15 October 1935 – 28 March 2012) was a screenwriter who predominantly worked in Malayalam cinema.

== Life ==
Damodaran wrote the screenplays of films such as Angaadi (1980), Ahimsa (1981), John Jaffer Janardhanan (1982), Ee Nadu (1982), Iniyengilum (1983), Ithiri Poove Chuvanna Poove (1984), Vaartha (1986), Avanazhi (1986), 1921 (1988), Aryan (1988), Arhatha (1990), Inspector Balram (1990), Abhimanyu (1991), Adhwaytham (1992), Jackpot (1993) and Kaalapani (1996) among which the latter won four National Film Awards and seven Kerala State Film Awards.

As a writer and producer, he frequently collaborated with the directors I. V. Sasi and Priyadarshan. He also penned for the film Unaroo with director Maniratnam.

Damodaran was married to Pushpa, who died in 2011. Their eldest daughter, Deedi Damodaran, is also a screenwriter of Malayalam cinema. She made her debut with the film Gulmohar. Damodaran died of a massive heart attack at his home in Kozhikode on 28 March 2012, aged 76.

== Selected filmography ==
Year	Title	Director
2006	Yes Your Honour	V. M. Vinu
2006	Balram vs. Taradas	I. V. Sasi
2000	Sradha	I. V. Sasi
1999	Megham	Priyadarshan
1999	Stalin Shivadas	T. S. Suresh Babu
1996	Mahathma	Shaji Kailas
1996	Kalapani	Priyadarshan
1995	Kaattile Thadi Thevarude Aana	Haridas
1994	The City	I. V. Sasi
1993	Janam	Viji Thampi
1993	Jackpot	Joemon
1992	Advaitham	Priyadarshan
1991	Abhimanyu	Priyadarshan
1991	Inspector Balram	I. V. Sasi
1990	Aanaval Mothiram	G. S. Vijayan
1990	Arhatha	I. V. Sasi
1988	Aryan	Priyadarshan
1988	1921	I. V. Sasi
1988	Abkari	I. V. Sasi
1987	Nalkavala	I. V. Sasi
1987	Ithrayum Kaalam	I. V. Sasi
1987	Vrutham	I. V. Sasi
1987	Adimakal Udamakal	I. V. Sasi
1986	Adiverukal	P. Anil
1986	Avanazhi	I. V. Sasi
1986	Vaartha	I. V. Sasi
1985	Angadikkappurath	I. V. Sasi
1984	Ithiri Poove Chuvanna Poove	Bharathan
1984	Unaroo	Manirathnam
1983	Himam	Joshiy
1983	Kattathe Kilikkoodu	Bharathan
1983	America America	I.V. Sasi
1983	Iniyenkilum	I. V. Sasi
1983	Nanayam	I. V. Sasi
1982	Innallenkil Naale	I. V. Sasi
1982	Ee Nadu	I. V. Sasi
1982	John Jaffer Janardhanan	I. V. Sasi
1982	Thadakam	I. V. Sasi
1981	Thusharam	I. V. Sasi
1981	Ahimsa	I. V. Sasi
1981	Hamsa Geetham	I. V. Sasi
1980	Kanthavalayam	I. V. Sasi
1980	Meen	I. V. Sasi
1980	Angaadi	I. V. Sasi
1979	Aarattu	I. V. Sasi
1976	Ammini Ammavan	Hariharan
1975	Love Marriage	Hariharan
