= Geetha =

Geetha may refer to:

- Geetha (actress) (born 1962), Indian actress
- P. Geetha Jeevan (born 1970), Tamil Nadu minister.
- P. Geetha, Kerala feminist writer.
- Geetha Salam (1946–2018), Indian actor also known as Abdul Salam
- Geetha Vazhachal, Adivasi social activist
- Geetha Vijayan (born 1972), Indian actress
- Sathi Geetha (born 1983), Indian sprinter
- Geetha (1981 film), a Kannada film
- Geetha (2019 film), a Kannada film
- Geetha (TV series), a 2020 Kannada serial
- GEETHA, a syllabic abbreviation for the Hellenic National Defense General Staff (ΓΕΕΘΑ)
- Geetha Angara homicide, a 2005 murder case of an Indian-American in New Jersey, US

== See also ==
- Geeta (disambiguation)
- Githa (disambiguation)
- Geetam, an element of Carnatic music
- Geetham (film), a 1986 Indian film
- Geetam Tiwari, an Indian engineer
