= Gita (disambiguation) =

The Gita, or the Bhagavad Gita, is a Sanskrit text, part of the Mahabharata.

Gita or Geeta may also refer to:

== Music ==
- Gita (album), an album by Raul Seixas
- Geeta (album), an album by Charles Lloyd
- Mahāgīta, the complete corpus of Burmese classical songs

== Places ==
- Gita, Stara Zagora Province, a village in Stara Zagora Province, Bulgaria
- Gita, Israel, a village

== People ==
- Gita (given name) or Geeta, an Indian feminine given name (including a list of persons with the name)
- Oshri Gita (born 1985), Israeli footballer

== Other uses ==
- GITA, Gaza International Transitional Authority, a body proposed in September 2025 to administer the Gaza Strip in the aftermath of the Gaza War.
- GITA, Global Innovation & Technology Alliance, established by the Technology Development Board of India
- Gita (elephant), an Asian elephant at the Los Angeles Zoo whose death ired animal rights activists
- Gita (mobile carrier), a cargo-carrying robot
- Gita Press, a publisher of Hindu religious texts
- Cyclone Gita, 2018 South Pacific cyclone
- Geeta (1940 film), an Indian Bollywood film
- Gita (Sholay), a fictional character played by Gita Siddharth in the 1975 classic Indian film Sholay

== See also ==
- Githa (disambiguation)
- Geetha (disambiguation)
- Geet (disambiguation)
- Bhagavad Gita (disambiguation)
- Geetam, an element of Carnatic music
- Geetham (film), a 1986 Indian film
- Geetam Tiwari, an Indian engineer
- Avadhuta Gita
- Ashtavakra Gita
- Devi Gita
- Ganesha Gita, from the Sanskrit text Ganesha Purana
- Geeta Bhawan, suburb of Indore, India
- Gita Govinda, a poem by Jayadeva Goswami
- Gita Jayanti, the day of the legendary manifestation of the Bhagavad Gita, celebrated annually
- Uddhava Gita
- Yogi Gita
