= Githa =

Githa, a given name, may refer to:

- Githa Hariharan, Indian author and editor
- Githa Sowerby, English playwright, children's writer, and member of the Fabian Society
- Gytha Thorkelsdóttir, also known as Githa, Danish noble

== See also ==
- Ongole Gittha, 2013 Indian film
- Geetam, an element of Carnatic music
- Geetham (film), a 1986 Indian film
- Geetam Tiwari, an Indian engineer
- Gita (disambiguation)
- Geetha (disambiguation)
- Gytha (disambiguation)
