= Geet =

Geet may refer to:

== Media ==
- Geet (song), a traditional Hindi or Urdu song
- Geet (1944 film), an Indian Hindi-language film
- Geet (1970 film), an Indian Hindi-language film directed by Ramanand Sagar
- Geet (1992 film), an Indian Hindi-language film directed by Parto Ghosh
- Geet (2007 film), working title of the Indian film Jab We Met and the name of the lead character portrayed by Kareena Kapoor
- Geet – Hui Sabse Parayi, a Hindi-language soap opera airing in India

== People ==
- Geet (TikToker), an Indian motivational speaker
- Geet Chaturvedi, a Hindi poet and novelist from India
- Geet Sagar, the winner of India's inaugural season of X Factor (2011)
- Geet Sethi, a professional player of English billiards

== See also ==
- Geeta (disambiguation)
- Geats, a North Germanic tribe
