= Gytha (disambiguation) =

Gytha is a synonym for the ground spider genus Eilica.

Gytha may also refer to:

- Gytha of Wessex (1053/1061–c. 1098), daughter of King Harold II of England and spouse of Vladimir II Monomakh of Kyiv
- Gytha Thorkelsdóttir (c. 997 - c. 1069), Danish noblewoman, mother of King Harold Godwinson and of Edith of Wessex, grandmother of the former Gytha (of Wessex)
- Gytha Ogg, a character from Terry Pratchett's Discworld series

== See also ==
- Githa (disambiguation)
