= Gita (given name) =

- Gender: Female
- Language: Sanskrit

Origin
- Meaning: "song" "sacred song or poem"
- Region of origin: India

Other names
- Alternative spelling: Geeta

Gita, or Geeta (Devanagari: गीता gītā), is an Indian feminine given name.

== List of people with the given name ==
- Geeta Aiyer (born 1958), Indian entrepreneur and business leader
- Geeta Anand, journalist and author who writes for the Wall Street Journal
- Geeta Bali (1930–1965), Bollywood actress
- Geeta Basra, Bollywood actress
- Geeta Chopra, involved in the Geeta and Sanjay Chopra kidnapping case
- Geeta Citygirl, actor, dancer, director, producer
- Gita Dey, Indian actress
- Gita Dodova, Bulgarian triple jumper
- Geeta Dutt, Indian singer
- Geeta Gandbhir, American filmmaker
- Gita Ghatak, Indian actress and singer
- Gita Gopinath, Indian-American economist
- Gita Gutawa, Indonesian singer
- Geeta Iyengar, Yoga teacher
- Gita Johar, business professor
- Geeta Kapoor, Bollywood choreographer
- Gita Kapoor, a fictional character in the soap opera EastEnders
- Geeta Kapur (born 1943), Indian art critic and curator
- Gita Krishnankutty, Indian Malayalam-English translator
- Gita Mehta (born 1943), Indian writer
- Geeta Nargund, medical director
- Geeta Novotny, American mezzo-soprano, actor, writer and columnist
- Geeta Patel, American film and television director
- Geeta Phogat, wrestler
- Gita Piramal, Indian writer and business historian
- Geeta Rani, Indian weightlifter
- Geeta Rao Gupta, AIDS and feminist activist
- J. Geeta Reddy, Indian politician
- Gita Sahgal, British writer, journalist, film director, feminist activist, and human rights activist
- Geeta Sane, feminist writer
- Gita Siddharth, Indian actress and social worker
- Geeta Vadhera, artist
- Gita Wirjawan, Indonesian entrepreneur, ex-investment banker, music and film producer, and podcaster
- Geeta Zutshi, Indian athlete

== See also ==
- Gita (disambiguation)
