= Dinesh Mohan =

Indian academic (1945–2021)

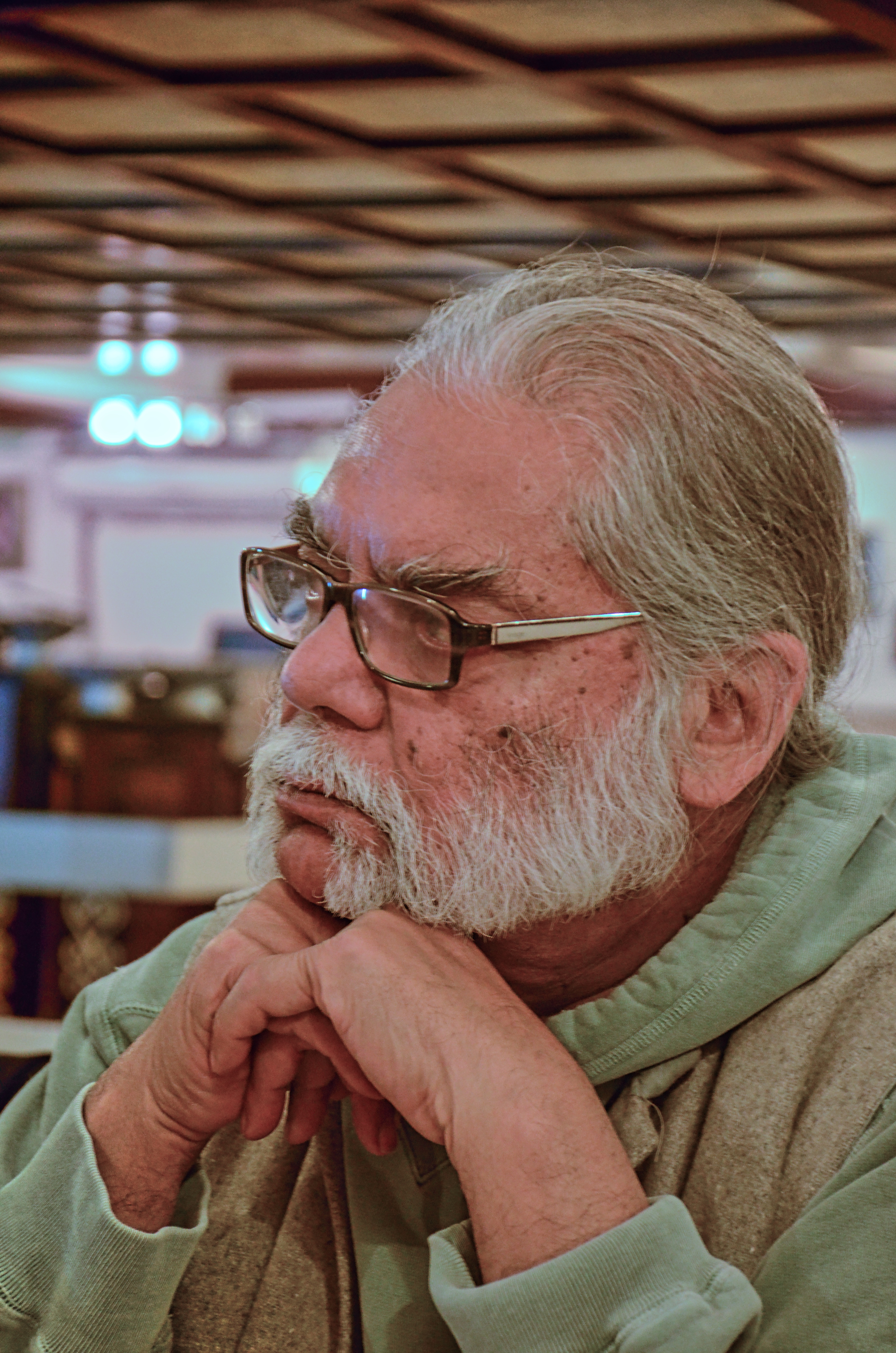
- Born: 4 October 1945; British India
- Died: 21 May 2021 (aged 75); New Delhi, India
- Education: The Doon School; Indian Institute of Technology Bombay BTech; University of Delaware, Newark M.S. University of Michigan, Ann Arbor M.S., PhD
- Spouse: Peggy Mohan (née Ramesar)
- Scientific career
- Fields: Transportation Research; Human Tolerance Biomechanics; Biomechanical Considerations in Helmet Design; Road Traffic Injuries; Agricultural Injuries
- Workplaces: Indian Institute of Technology Delhi
- Website: cbme.iitd.ac.in/content/prof-mohan-dinesh

Dinesh Mohan was honorary professor at Indian Institute of Technology Delhi (IIT Delhi) since 2017. He was distinguished professor at Shiv Nadar University, Gautam Buddha Nagar (India) from 2016 to 2018. From 2010 to 2015 he was Emeritus Volvo Chair Professor for Transportation Planning & Safety at IITD. He was head of Centre for Biomedical Engineering (1991–1996), Coordinator of the Transportation Research and Injury Prevention Programme (1998–2010) and head, W.H.O. Collaborating Centre for Research and Training in Safety Technology at IIT Delhi (1991–2010). He was also Director, Independent Council for Road Safety International (www.icorsi.org).

Mohan died from COVID-19 on 21 May 2021 at the age of 75 in St. Stephen’s Hospital, New Delhi.

== Biography ==
Mohan was in Rajiv Gandhi's batch at The Doon School. Mohan was one of the world's leading experts on traffic safety issues and human tolerance to injury. His work has significantly advanced motorcycle helmet design, pedestrian and bicyclist safety and child restraint regulations, and helped develop safer ways for various modes of transportation to safely share the roadways. He and his colleagues are responsible for bringing the world's attention to the importance of the safety of pedestrians, bicyclists and motorcyclists internationally and popularising the term 'vulnerable road users' in reference to these road users. His group has contributed to national and international policies on traffic safety, and Indian policies on urban transportation. He along with his team helped develop policies on safer fireworks, agricultural equipment like fodder cutters and threshers, school bus designs, motor vehicle and helmet standards.

While a graduate student at University of Delaware (UD) in mechanical and aerospace engineering between 1967 and 1970, he studied under JL Nowinski, Jack Vinson, Herbert Kingsbury and Barry Schneider, who, he said, each left an indelible mark on the importance of fundamental understanding of engineering principles. He credited the foundation he gained at UD in solid mechanics with influencing his career in biomedical engineering, especially his work on the mechanical properties of hard and soft tissues. Both, he underscored, require strong background in non-linear anisotropic materials and dynamic impacts.

From the University of Delaware he moved to the University of Michigan to obtain a PhD in Bioengineering. While there he worked at the Highway Safety Research Institute (now University of Michigan Transportation Research Institute) with pioneers Professor Don Chaffin in ergonomics, Dr. John Melvin and Dr. Richard Stalnaker in impact biomechanics and was influenced on science and society issues by Professor John Platt. While there he worked on biomechanics of injury to the chest, lower limbs and human soft tissues.

Mohan launched his career as a senior bioengineer with the Insurance Institute for Highway Safety in Washington D.C. He came under the influence of the institute's president, Dr. William Haddon, widely considered the guru of injury control and safety science. At the institute he worked closely with Brian O’Neill, Allan Williams and Leon Robertson, who are considered international authorities on road safety. There, he conducted and published the first real-world assessment of airbag effectiveness in frontal crashes of General Motors cars. His work there also impacted the evolution of regulations requiring children to be secured in a back seat.

He moved to India in 1979 to join the Indian Institute of Technology Delhi, where he served as State Bank Chair for Biomechanics and Rehabilitation between 1981 and 1991; He served as the Henry Ford Chair for Traffic Safety Biomechanics (1996–2005) and then Volvo Chair for Transportation and Planning and Safety (2007–2015).

Mohan is also credited with publishing some of the earliest studies on the limited role of hard shells in motorcycle helmets, mechanical properties of human soft tissues at very high strain rates, head injury criteria for children, safety of three-wheeled scooter taxis, and bringing national attention to burn injuries caused by fireworks during the Diwali festival in India and agricultural injuries due to farm machines.

Mohan was also active in the human rights movement in India. He co-authored reports on communal violence in many cities in India, human rights violations in Kashmir, reports on the destruction of the Babri Masjid in Ayodhya, Bhopal gas disaster, and the burning of the railway carriage in Godhra, Gujarat. He was a founder member of the Pakistan India Forum for Peace and Democracy which was established in 1994.

Mohan was a member of People's Union for Civil Liberties (PUCL) from its inception in 1980 and took active part in its activities. While he participated in numerous PUCL activities in the 1980 – 1990’s, his greatest contribution was as one of the four member citizen’s Fact Finding and investigative team formed jointly by People's Union For Democratic Rights (PUDR) and People's Union For Civil Liberties to enquire into the anti-Sikh riots which swept across Delhi in the wake of Indira Gandhi’s assassination. Participating on behalf of the PUCL, Mohan played a key role in drafting the report, "Who are the guilty? - A Report of a Joint Inquiry into the Causes and Impact of the Riots in Delhi from 31st October to 10th November, 1984". It studied the outbreak of violence in which around 3000 innocent Sikhs were brutally killed.

== Most notable honors and awards ==
- Distinguished Alumni Award, University of Delaware (2012)
- Indo Canadian Shastri Institute India Studies Visiting Lecturer (2008)
- International Ambassador of the International Bone and Joint Decade 2000–2010 (2005)
- Annual Farm Safety Research Award (USA) for best paper (with A. Kumar, M. Varghese and R. Patel) 2003
- Distinguished Alumnus Award, Indian Institute of Technology, Bombay.
- 2001 Bertil Aldman Award for outstanding contribution to the subject of impact biomechanics, International Research Council on Biomechanics of Impacts (2001)
- 1997 Velo-City Falco Lecture Prize (with G. Tiwari)
- 1996 Haddon Memorial Award for best paper in safety research
- American Public Health Association, 2000 International Distinguished Career Award in recognition of outstanding dedication and leadership in injury control and emergency health services.
- Association for Advancement of Automotive Medicine, 1991 Award of Merit for outstanding research in traffic safety.
- International Association for Accident & Traffic Medicine, International Award and Medal for Outstanding Achievement in the Field of Traffic Medicine (1991).

== Membership ==
=== International committees and boards ===
- Board of International Research Council on Biomechanics of Impacts (Past).
- WHO Expert Advisory Panel on Injury & Violence Prevention and Control (Past).
- Fellow of International Association of Traffic and Safety Sciences (IATSS)
- Steering Committee, World Conference on Transport Research Society (WCTRS) (Past)
- Director, Independent Council for Road Safety International (www.icorsi.org)

=== National committees and boards ===
- Member, National Transport Policy Development Committee (NTDPC) Working group on Urban Transport (2012), Ministry of Urban Development (MoUD), Government of India
- Director, Mawana Sugar Ltd
- Director, DIMTS Ltd
- Secretary, Sanchal Foundation

=== Editorial boards ===
- International Journal of Epidemiology (2010–2018)
- Injury Control and Safety Promotion
- Journal of Safety Research
- Accident Analysis and Prevention (1986–2006)
- Traffic Injury Prevention (1996–2014)
- Safety Science (1991–2010)

== Publications ==
=== Books ===
- Dinesh Mohan and Geetam Tiwari: Sustainable Approaches to Urban Transport. CRC Press, 2019
- Geetam Tiwari and Dinesh Mohan: Transport Planning & Traffic Safety, CRC Press, Taylor & Francis Group, 2016.
- D. Mohan: Safety, Sustainability and Future Urban Transport, Eicher Goodearth Limited, 2013
- L.Berger and D. Mohan "Injury Control : A Global View", Oxford University Press, 1996
- Peter Barss, Gordon Smith, Susan Baker and Dinesh Mohan "Injury Prevention: An International Perspective", Oxford University Press, 1998
- Dinesh Mohan and Geetam Tiwari "Injury Prevention and Control", Taylor & Francis, 2000
- Mohan, D., Tiwari, G., Khayesi, M., & Nafukho, F. M. Road Traffic Injury Prevention Training Manual. World Health Organization, Geneva, 2006
- Peden, M., Scurfield, R., Sleet, D., Mohan, D., Hyder, A. A., Jarawan, E., and Mathers. C. (eds) World Report on Road Traffic Injury Prevention. World Health Organization, Geneva, 2004.
- Mohan D and Varghese M. Injuries in South-East Asia Region : Priorities for Policy and Action, SAERO, World New Delhi, 2003.

=== Reports and monographs ===
- S.N. Tandon and Dinesh Mohan: Status of Biomedical Engineering in India, 1982.
- Dinesh Mohan: Motorcycle Safety Project, 1984.
- Dinesh Mohan: Indian Issues in Science and Technology, 1984.
- Dinesh Mohan and K.P. Kothiyal: Aids for the Visually Disabled, 1984.
- Dinesh Mohan, et al.: Aids for the Disabled a Research Bibliography, 1984.
- Dinesh Mohan:Injuries in India : A Survey, 1986.
- Dinesh Mohan: Biomechanical Analysis of Jaipur Lower Limb Prosthesis, 1986.
- Dinesh Mohan: Aids for the Disabled : A Technology Assessment, 1988.
- Dinesh Mohan and Imrana Qadeer: Safety of Agricultural Implements, 1990.
- Dinesh Mohan and Rajesh Patel: Safety Assessment of Motorcycle Helmets Being Sold in Delhi, 1992.
- Dinesh Mohan and Geetam Tiwari: Development of a Recording System for Road Accident Data (Vol-I and II), 1995.
- Dinesh Mohan, K.S. Bawa Bhalla and Sunil R. Kale: Research Study on Burn Properties of Fabrics in Use in India,1995.
- Dinesh Mohan, Rajesh Patel and A.R. Ray: Development and Identification of Protective Fabrics for Agricultural Workers, 1995.
- Dinesh Mohan and Amit Deopura: Accidental Deaths in India: A Statistical Survey,1996.
- Dinesh Mohan and Nicole Muhlrad: Introduction to Road Traffic Safety: A Multidisciplinary Approach, 1996.
- Dinesh Mohan, Anoop Chawla, Janusz Kajzer: Safety of Front Seat Passengers in the Tata Sierra: Analysis of Vehicle Performance and Guidelines for Safe Design of the Car Interior, 1997.
- Dinesh Mohan, Geetam Tiwari, Rajeev Saraf, S.G. Deshmukh, Sunil R. Kale, S.Wadhwa and G.V. Soumitri: Delhi on the Move:2005-Future Traffic Management Scenarios, 1997.
- Dinesh Mohan and Ragnar Andersson: Introduction to Injury Control and Safety Promotion, 1997.
- Dinesh Mohan and Nicole Muhlrad: Introduction to Road Traffic Safety: A Multidisciplinary Approach, 1998.
- Dinesh Mohan and Ragnar Andersson: Introduction to Injury Control and Safety Promotion, 2000.
