= Oruvar Vaazhum Aalayam =

- Theatrical release poster
- Directed by: Shanmugapriyan
- Written by: Shanmugapriyan
- Produced by: M. M. Thaha
- Starring: Sivakumar; Prabhu; Rahman; Raadhu
- Cinematography: Viswam Nataraj
- Edited by: R. Baskaren
- Music by: Ilaiyaraaja
- Production company: Royal Cini Creations
- Release date: 23 March 1988
- Running time: 119 minutes
- Country: India
- Language: Tamil

Oruvar Vaazhum Aalayam (transl. The temple where one lives) is a 1988 Indian Tamil-language film, written and directed by Shanmugapriyan. The film stars Sivakumar, Prabhu, Rahman and Raadhu. It was released on 23 March 1988.

== Plot ==
Jeeva and Swaminathan are friends who meet up by fate. Swaminathan hates women and does not respect them, but Jeeva respects women. The story then goes back to a village where Jeeva comes to learn carnatic music from Sivagurunathan. Sivagurunathan does not accept to teach him music. Meanwhile, Jeeva loves Sarada, the daughter of Sivagurunathan. She is also pecked by the village headman. Sivagurunathan loses his belief in God and disrespects everyone he meets. A tragic story of him is revealed where he is married to Sivakami, who is a dancer ignored by the village. She gives birth to Sarada and passes away as she is a heart patient, which was unknown to Sivagurunathan. He assumes that the cause of death for his wife was his own daughter. The only way to become his student is to sing a song sung by Sivakami, as suggested by Sarada. He accepts Jeeva as his student.

At first, Sivagurunathan does not accept their love but then accepts it when Sarada attempts suicide. Meanwhile, the village headman plans to kill Jeeva. Jeeva's father comes to speak of their marriage and insults Sivagurunathan. At that moment, he plans to marry Sarada to his servant's son Swaminathan. It takes time for them to get going in their life. Meanwhile, the village headman still pecks at Sarada. Sivagurunathan gives a concert for a lakh rupees and dies. Later Swaminathan suspects his wife of an affair with Jeeva, rumoured around the village. However, it is a devious plan hatched by the headman to manhandle Sarada. The movie ends with a reunion of the couple with Jeeva sacrificing his life in the fight with the village head.

== Cast ==
- Sivakumar as Sivagurunathan
- Prabhu as Swaminathan
- Rahman as Jeeva
- Raadhu as Saradha
- Ambika as Sivakami (Special Appearance)
- Senthil
- Pasi Narayanan
- Anandaraj
- Sethu Vinayagam
- Raj Bhagadhoor
- G. Sreenivasan
- Janardhanan
- Jayabal
- Chinna Murugan
- Sivaraman
- Mottai Seetharaman
- Durai
- Kandhasamy
- Arunachalam
- Madurai Saroja
- Viji
- Premi
- Yogeswari
- Susheela

== Production ==
Oruvar Vaazhum Aalayam is the debut film for Anandaraj. It also marked the return of Raadhu to Tamil cinema after Nizhalgal (1980).

== Soundtrack ==
The music was composed by Ilaiyaraaja. The song "Nee Pournami" is set in Simhendramadhyamam raga. "Vaanin Devi" is set in Amritavarshini, "Uyire Uyire" is set in Mayamalavagowla raga and "Pallaviye Saranam" is set in Khamas.

Song	Singers	Lyrics
"Baby You Are My"	Francis Lazarus, Anuradha	Dr. Kalyan
"Nee Pournami"	K. J. Yesudas	Ponnadiyan
"Pallaviye Charanam"	S. Janaki, S. P. Balasubrahmanyam	Ponnadiyan
"Malaiyoram Mayile"	Malaysia Vasudevan, K. S. Chithra	Ponnadiyan
"Uyire Uyire"	K. J. Yesudas, S. Janaki	Ponnadiyan
"Singaara Pennoruthi"	Mano	Ponnadiyan
"Vaanin Devi Varuga"	S. P. Balasubrahmanyam, S. Janaki	Ponnadiyan
