= Sajan (director) =

Indian film director

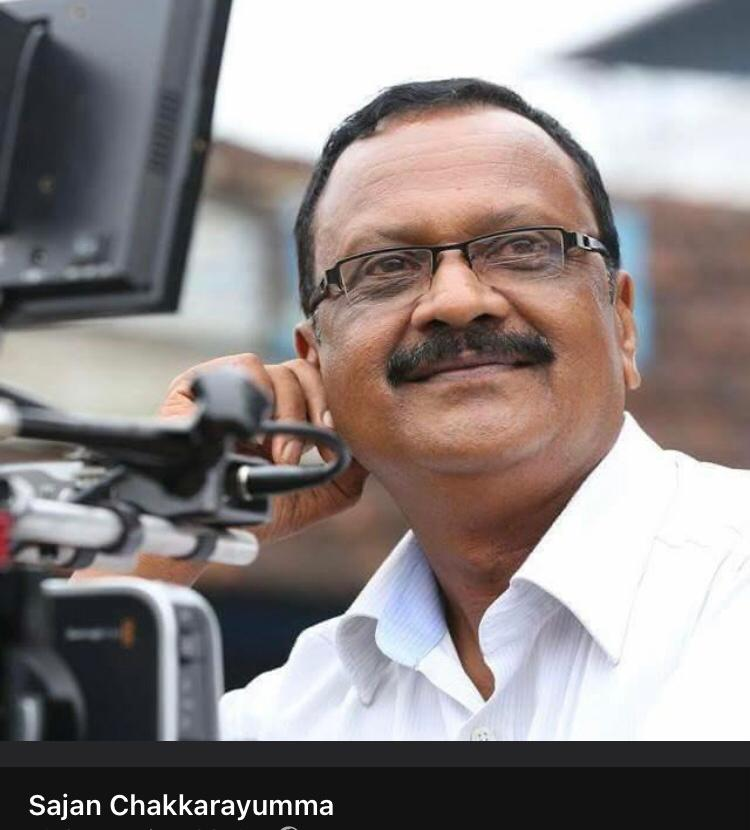
SAJAN CHAKKARAYUMMA

Sajan is an Indian film director who works in Malayalam and Tamil films. Since the early 1980s he has directed some 30 films. He has also done many television serials and telefilms. Sajan's real name is Siddeeq. He assessed by Crossbelt Mani, N. Sankaran Nair, J. Williams and Sasidharan Nair.

== Filmography ==
Year	Film	Lead	Language	Notes
1979	Ishtapraaneshwari	Jose (actor)	Malayalam	
1979	Akkarekku varungala		Tamil	
1984	Chakkarayumma	Mammootty	Malayalam	Baby Shalini
1984	Koottinilamkili	Mammootty	Malayalam	
1985	Thammil Thammil	Mammootty, Rahman	Malayalam	
1985	Akkacheyude Kunjuvava	Ratheesh	Malayalam	Baby Shalini
1985	Oru Nokku Kanan	Mammootty	Malayalam	Baby Shalini
1985	Archana Aaradhana	Shankar Panicker	Malayalam	
1985	Kandu Kandarinju	Mammootty, Mohanlal, Rahman	Malayalam	
1986	Love Story (1986 film)	Shafeeq (actor)	Malayalam	
1986	Naale Njangalude Vivaham	Shankar	Malayalam	Shafeeq
1986	Snehamulla Simham	Mammootty	Malayalam	Shafeeq
1986	Geetham (film)	Mammootty	Malayalam	Mohanlal
1986	Ennu Nathante Nimmi	Rahman, Raadhu, Mammootty	Malayalam	
1987	Nirabhedhangal	Geetha Ambika	Malayalam	Prathap Pothen
1990	Naale Ennundengil	Sukumaran	Malayalam	
1991	Amina Tailors	Ashokan	Malayalam	
1992	Mr & Mrs (1992 film)	Jagadish	Malayalam	
1995	Mangalyasootram	Murali	Malayalam	
1997	Oru Mutham Manimutham	Mukesh	Malayalam	
2013	Progress Report	Lalu Alex	Malayalam	

== Television serials ==
- Krishna paksham(Dooradarsan)
- Thapasya(Dooradarsan)
- Desadanapakshi(Asianet)
- Mouna mekhangal(Asianet)
- Mizhiyoram(Asianet)
- Chechiyamma
- Sthreethwam(surya)
- Sthree-Part3(Asianet)
- Snehatheeram
- Swantham lekhakan
- Kanappurangal

== Telefilms ==
- Kaliwatch
- Nirnnayam
- Alapanam
- Ganakokilam

== See also ==
- List of Malayalam films from 1976 to 1980
- List of Malayalam films from 1981 to 1985
- List of Malayalam films from 1986 to 1990
- List of Malayalam films from 1991 to 1995
- List of Malayalam films from 1996 to 2000
