= Naale Ennundengil =

- VCD cover
- Directed by: Sajan
- Written by: E. Mosus
- Screenplay by: Sajan
- Starring: Sukumaran; Silk Smitha; Captain Raju; Jagannatha Varma
- Cinematography: Robert
- Edited by: Kuppuswamy
- Music by: Shyam
- Production company: Supreme Film Productions
- Release date: 12 March 1990
- Country: India
- Language: Malayalam

Naale Ennundengil is a 1990 Indian Malayalam-language film, directed by Sajan. The film stars Sukumaran, Silk Smitha, Captain Raju and Jagannatha Varma in the lead roles. The film has musical score by Shyam.

== Cast ==
- Sukumaran
- Silk Smitha
- Captain Raju
- Jagannatha Varma
- Jagannathan
- KPAC Sunny
- Mohanraj
- Nataraj
- Rajesh
- Sreenath
- Suma Jayaram
- Vishnuprakash
- Y. G. Mahendran
- S.K.Sabapathy

== Soundtrack ==
The music was composed by Shyam and the lyrics were written by Chunakkara Ramankutty.

No.	Song	Singers	Lyrics	Length (m:ss)
1	"Ee Vediyil Oru Raagam"	K. S. Chithra	Chunakkara Ramankutty	
2	"Raathrigandhi Nananju"	K. J. Yesudas, Lathika	Chunakkara Ramankutty	
