= Kadar people =

Kadar
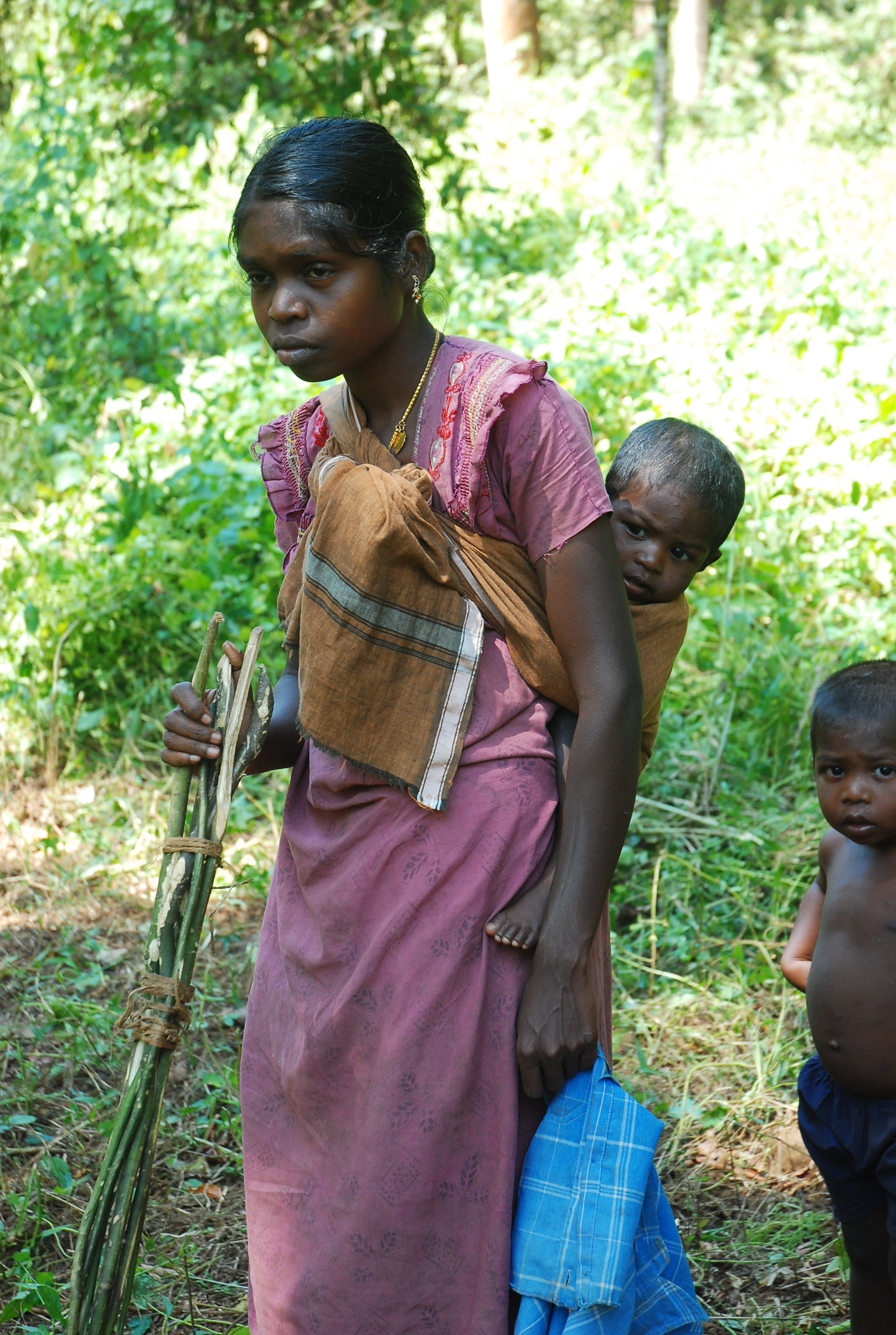
- A Kadar tribal woman of Kerala

Total population
- 2000-4000

Regions with significant populations
- Tamil Nadu, Kerala

Languages
- Kadar language

Religion
- Animism, Hinduism

Related ethnic groups
- Dravidian; Malayali people; Tamil people; Paraiyar

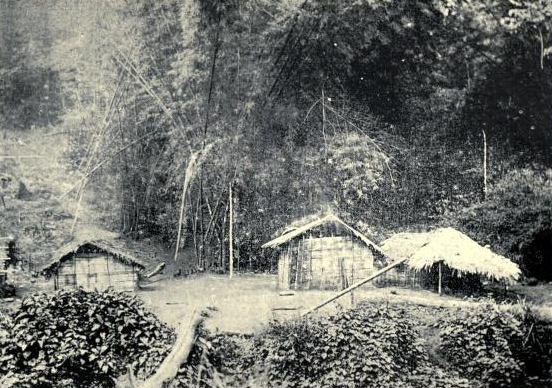
Kadar hut

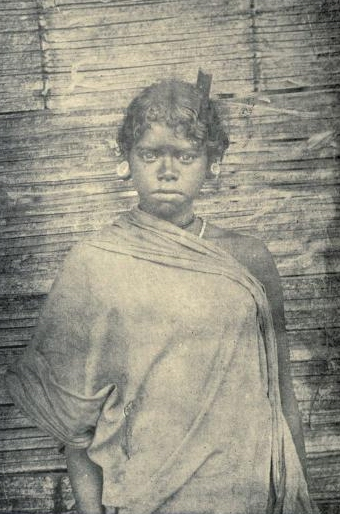
Kadar girl wearing a comb

The Kadar (also spelled Kadan or Kadir) are a tribal community or indigenous community in India, a designated Scheduled Tribe in the states of Tamil Nadu, Karnataka, and Kerala. They are an aboriginal tribe whose traditional way of life has been based on hunting and gathering.

== Name ==
Their name likely derives from the South Dravidian word kaadu meaning 'forest', either from Malayalam or from Tamil. The name is likely an exonym.

== Dwelling ==
They used to stay in the Annamalai Hills in the Western Ghats, but moved to other locations over the years. In a 1955 report, the Kadars were reported to reside in Tonder Desam, Terriote and Mangalasseri of Wynaad taluk. They also live in Palghat and Trichur districts. A 2001 census located Kadar tribals in Chhitoor taluk, in Palakkad District.

== Economy ==
They specialized in collecting honey, wax, sago, arrowroot, cardamom, ginger, and umbrella sticks for trade with merchants from the plains. The people of the Paraiyar community claim that the Kadars are part of Paraiyar who live and take care of forest and forest lives.

== Modern history ==
In the early twentieth century, the Kadars used to work with forest officials to take care of forest and guide royal hunting parties in the princely state of Cochin. Currently, many of the tribe members have moved to areas closer to the plains and urban areas. In addition to their traditional occupations, they work as agricultural laborers, basket makers and map weavers. They face many issues such as lack of infrastructure and educational opportunities. They do not interact with other communities as outsiders are prohibited from entering the forests they live in, in order to protect the wildlife. However, in recent decades, many Kadar tribe members have joined mainstream educational institutions and work places and married outside the tribe.

== Language ==
Their language Kadar is critically endangered and at risk of disappearing forever due to speakers shifting to regional languages such as Tamil.

== Religion and religious practices ==
The Kadars practice Animism and Hinduism.

== Notable people ==
Geetha Vazhachal, from the Kadar community settled in Vazhacal, Thrissur, is a well-known and award-winning activist who works for the rights of the community.
