= Ishtapraaneshwari =

- Directed by: Sajan
- Written by: Prabhu; Bichu Thirumala (dialogues)
- Screenplay by: Bichu Thirumala
- Starring: Jose; Shobha
- Cinematography: Lekshman Gore
- Edited by: Sasikumar
- Music by: Shyam
- Production company: Sree Creations
- Distributed by: Sree Creations
- Release date: 14 December 1979
- Country: India
- Language: Malayalam

Ishtapraaneshwari is a 1979 Indian Malayalam language film, directed by Sajan. The film stars Jose, and Shobha, with musical score by Shyam.

== Cast ==
- Jose as Rajan
- Shobha as Rema
- Kanchana as Rajani
- Kaduvakulam Antony as Kurup
- P. K. Abraham as Muthalali
- Thodupuzha Radhakrishnan as Bhadran
- Thrissur Gracy as Syamala
- Syamala as Leela
- Ramesh as Velayudhan

== Soundtrack ==
The music was composed by Shyam and the lyrics were written by Bichu Thirumala.

No.	Song	Singers	Lyrics	Length (m:ss)
1	"Neeraazhiyum Poomaanavum"	P. Jayachandran, Vani Jairam, S. P. Balasubrahmanyam	Bichu Thirumala	
2	"Poovum Neerum"	P. Jayachandran, Vani Jairam	Bichu Thirumala	
