= Eilica lotzi =

Scientific classification
- Kingdom: Animalia
- Phylum: Arthropoda
- Subphylum: Chelicerata
- Class: Arachnida
- Order: Araneae
- Infraorder: Araneomorphae
- Family: Gnaphosidae
- Genus: Eilica
- Species: E. lotzi

Binomial name
- Eilica lotzi FitzPatrick, 2002

Species of spider

Eilica lotzi is a species of spider in the family Gnaphosidae. It is endemic to the Free State Province of South Africa.

== Distribution ==
Eilica lotzi is known from the Free State, recorded from Bloemfontein, Amanzi Private Game Reserve, and Tussen-die-Riviere Nature Reserve.

== Habitat and ecology ==
The species is a free-living ground dweller sampled with pitfall traps from the Grassland biome at altitudes ranging from 1,288 to 1,357 m above sea level.

== Description ==
Eilica lotzi is known only from the male. The carapace and abdomen are dark brown without pattern, the coxa, trochanter and patella are light brown, and other leg segments are darker brown.

== Conservation ==
Eilica lotzi is listed as Data Deficient for taxonomic reasons. The species is protected in Amanzi Private Game Reserve and Tussen-die-Riviere Nature Reserve. More sampling is needed to collect females and determine the species' range.

== Etymology ==
The species is named after arachnologist Leon N. Lotz.

== Taxonomy ==
E. lotzi was originally described by FitzPatrick in 2002 from Bloemfontein.
