= Ennu Nathante Nimmi =

- Poster
- Directed by: Sajan
- Written by: Dinesh; Murali; S. N. Swamy (dialogues)
- Screenplay by: S. N. Swamy
- Produced by: P. T. Xavier
- Starring: Mammootty; Rahman; Raadhu; Sukumari
- Cinematography: Ramachandra Babu
- Edited by: V. P. Krishnan
- Music by: Shyam
- Production company: Vijaya Productions
- Distributed by: Vijaya Productions
- Release date: 19 December 1986
- Country: India
- Language: Malayalam

Ennu Nathante Nimmi is a 1986 Indian Malayalam-language film, directed by Sajan and produced by P. T. Xavier. The film stars Mammootty, Rahman, Raadhu, and Sukumari. The film has musical score by Shyam.

== Cast ==
- Mammooty as Mahesh
- Rahman as Nathan
- Raadhu as Nirmala
- Baiju as Venkidi
- Sukumari
- Lizy as Reena
- Mukesh as Sreeni
- Thilakan as Chidambaram
- Kunchan as Thomas
- Mala Aravindan as Sayipp
- Kaviyoor Ponnamma as Nirmala's grandmother
- Mamukkoya as Fakrudeen
- Tony Antony as Bose
- Paravoor Bharathan
- N. L. Balakrishnan as Music director

== Soundtrack ==
The music was composed by Shyam and the lyrics were written by Chunakkara Ramankutty.

| No. | Song | Singers | Lyrics | Length (m:ss) |
|---|---|---|---|---|
| 1 | "Chembaneer Poo Polen" | K. J. Yesudas, K. S. Chithra | Chunakkara Ramankutty | |
| 2 | "Poove Arimullappoove" | K. S. Chithra, Unni Menon | Chunakkara Ramankutty | |
| 3 | "Sandhyakale" | K. J. Yesudas | Chunakkara Ramankutty | |
| 4 | "Sharathkaala Raavum" | K. S. Chithra | Chunakkara Ramankutty | |
| 5 | "Ullam Thulli" | Krishnachandran | Chunakkara Ramankutty | |
