= Progress Report =

- Directed by: Sajan
- Written by: P N Ajayakumar
- Produced by: Selvan Thamalam
- Starring: Lalu Alex; Siddique; Geetha; Sukumari
- Edited by: Johnkutty
- Music by: GK. Harish Mani
- Release date: 26 April 2013
- Country: India
- Language: Malayalam

Progress Report is a 2013 Indian Malayalam-language film, directed by Sajan and produced by Selvan Thamalam. The film stars Lalu Alex, Siddique, Geetha and Sukumari. mani

== Cast ==
- Lalu Alex
- Siddique
- Geetha
- Sukumari
- K. P. A. C. Lalitha

== Soundtrack ==
The music was composed by G. K. Harish Mani.

No.	Song	Singers	Lyrics	Length (m:ss)
1	"Bhoomi Penne"	Akhila Anand, Robin	Shivadas	5:01
2	"Kalyana Poovum"	Harish Mani, Saritha	Vinod Sudarshan	4:37
3	"Karivandolam"	M. G. Sreekumar, Rimi Tomy	Vinod Sudarshan	4:20
4	"Maariyamman Kovil"	Mano	Shivadas	4:12
5	"Poomanchalumayi"	K. J. Yesudas	O. N. V. Kurup	6:14
