= Mangalyasootram =

- Directed by: Sajan
- Produced by: P. T. Xavier
- Starring: Jagathy Sreekumar; Kalpana; Murali; A. C. Zainuddin
- Cinematography: Saloo George
- Music by: Berny-Ignatius
- Production company: Vijaya Movie Productions
- Distributed by: Vijaya Movie Productions
- Release date: 3 March 1995
- Country: India
- Language: Malayalam

Mangalyasootram is a 1995 Indian Malayalam film, directed by Sajan and produced by P. T. Xavier. The film stars Jagathy Sreekumar, Kalpana, Murali and A. C. Zainuddin in the lead roles. The film has musical score by C. Rajamani and songs by Berny-Ignatius.

== Cast ==
- Jagathy Sreekumar as Pullepadi Dasan
- Kalpana as Sumithra
- Murali as Karnan
- A. C. Zainuddin as Sujanan
- Indrans as Lorry Bhaskar
- Kanaka as Indu
- Kozhikode Narayanan Nair as Sukumaran Nair
- Shammi Thilakan as Bhadran
- Sonia as Nalini
- Adoor Bhavani as Narayaniyamma
- Kuthiravattam Pappu as Achithan
- Sreenath as Shivan
- Usharani as Adv. Maheshwaryamma

== Soundtrack ==
The music was composed by Berny-Ignatius and the lyrics were written by Gireesh Puthenchery.

No.	Song	Singers	Lyrics	Length (m:ss)
1	"Akkuthikkuthaana"	Chorus, Swarnalatha	Gireesh Puthenchery	
2	"Etho Venalkkinaavin"	K. S. Chithra	Gireesh Puthenchery	
3	"Etho Venalkkinaavin"	Unni Menon	Gireesh Puthenchery	
4	"Oro Narumozhi"	M. G. Sreekumar	Gireesh Puthenchery	
5	"Vellaaram Kilikal"	P. Jayachandran, Sujatha Mohan	Gireesh Puthenchery	
