= Kadathanadan Ambadi =

- Directed by: Priyadarshan
- Screenplay by: Cochin Haneefa; P. K. Sarangapani (Dialogues)
- Produced by: Sajan Vargeese
- Starring: Mohanlal; Prem Nazir; Cochin Haneefa
- Cinematography: S. Kumar
- Edited by: N. Gopalakrishnan
- Music by: Songs; K. Raghavan; Score; Johnson
- Production company: Saj Vision
- Distributed by: Saj Productions
- Release date: 14 April 1990
- Running time: 149 minutes
- Country: India
- Language: Malayalam

Kadathanadan Ambadi is a 1990 Indian Malayalam-language sword and sorcery film directed by Priyadarshan and written by Cochin Haneefa. It is a sequel to the 1964 film Thacholi Othenan and the 1970 film Othenente Makan. The film stars Mohanlal in the title role, along with Prem Nazir, Swapna, and Raadhu. A few shots from Thacholi Othenan were shown in this film. Kadathanadan Ambadi was released after the death of Prem Nazir.

== Plot ==
The movie is based on Kerala's traditional Vadakkanpattu (The Northern Ballad Folklore). The fictional story is about Kadathanadan Ambadi who wants to avenge the death of his father - Thacholi Manikoth Othenan Kuruppu - and retrieve the sacred sword Bhadravaal and Sacred Thread, which have been missing since the death of Thacholi Othenan.

Kadathanadan Ambadi, along with his mentor and martial arts guru sets out to investigate the mysterious disappearance of the sword. They suspect a Muslim manager of their household who has been missing since that day. While searching, they reach a kingdom, whose ruler is a mysterious Black Magician called Kowliya. Kowliya used to send his eagle to search for each's day beautiful lady, to be sacrificed each day for strengthening the King. In that process, the eagle settled on a house whose lady's marriage was fixed on that day. The soldiers dragged the girl and brought her to the sacrifice pit, only to be saved by Ambadi, who killed the King.

It was later found that, the girl and her brother were sons of . Moyideen narrates the story, who within the Thacholi family plotted to stage a coup and get hold of the sword, making the thief later sold as a slave to Tulunad's King. The King also holds the key to a secret magical cave where the sword is kept. Ambadi sets out to Tulunadu, where he lures the princess and gets to know the whereabouts of the key. Ambadi fights against the King and his soldiers and grabs the key from his necklace and proceeds to the Magical Cave with his Guru, Payyappilly Chanthu. He had to fight against the Demoness who guards the sword as well as a Water Demoness.

After getting back the Sacred Sword - "Bhadravaal", he returns to Kadathanadu with his Guru, Payyappilly Chanthu. But they were not aware of the fact that his father's sister - Unichala, her two children and Moosakkuutti were captured by Kathiroor Chandrappan. Payyappilly Chanthu's daughter Kunjilakshmi feels betrayed as she knew that Ambadi was not alone, but with a Princess.

== Cast ==
- Mohanlal as Kadathanadan Ambadi
- Prem Nazir as Payyampally Chanthu Gurukkal
- Sathyan as Thacholi Othenan (Ambadi's father) (Thacholi Othenan film scenes shows at the flashback story)
- Swapna as Sreedevi Thamburatti
- Raadhu as Kunjulakshmi, Chanthu Gurukkal's daughter
- Sreenivasan as Moosakkutty
- K. B. Ganesh Kumar as Unnichala's Son
- Maniyanpilla Raju as Kandasseri
- Jagathy Sreekumar as Karkodakan
- Jagadish as Brahmin
- Kaviyoor Ponnamma as Kunki, Ambadi's mother
- Sukumari as Unnichala
- Captain Raju as Kowliya Maharajah
- Thikkurissy Sukumaran Nair as Koma Kurup
- Cochin Haneefa as Kathiroor Chandrappan
- Santhosh as Thambikkutti, Chanthu Gurukkal's Son
- Kunjandi as Kandacheri Chappan
- Jayashankar as Thulanadan Kelu
- Priya as Unnichala's daughter
- Kunchan as Chanthu Gurukkal's sidekick
- Paravoor Bharathan as Unni Kurup
- Jose Prakash as Chandrappan's Uncle
- K. P. A. C. Sunny as Chandrappan's Brother
- C. I. Paul as Chandrappan's Brother
- Poojappura Ravi as Naduvazhi
- Sulakshana as Ayisha, Moosakkutty's sister
- Disco Shanthi as Nagayakshi, the demoness who fights with Ambadi in the cave
- Kothuku Nanappan as Beeran, Moosakkutty's father

Malayalam actor Shammi Thilakan dubbed for 20 characters, including the late Prem Nazir.

== High Court order ==
Negative rights were controlled by the Kerala High Court, Navodaya release, completed and released through Navodaya by the Kerala High Court order CRL.M.C.49 & 63 April 5/88 by the Honourable Mr. Justice Chettur Sankaran Nair and the Supreme Court judgement of 15, February 1989, SLP (CRL) 1127-28/88 & 1148-49/88 in the division bench of Honourable chief justice R. S. Pathak and Honourable S. Natarajan supervised by the Honourable court's commissioners Adv. Siby Mathew & Adv. Koshy George.

== Snippets ==
The film was originally produced by Sajan Varghese for Saj Productions. He was the head of Oriental Finance and Exchange Company and when the company faced loss, the respected Kerala High Court ordered to release the film and pay back the amount to depositors from the film's collections. The Court ordered Navodaya productions to take care of the release and give report to the Court. Kunjandi reprises his role Kandacheri Chappan from the 1964 movie Thacholi Othenan. Malayalam actor Shammi Thilakan dubbed for 20 characters, including the late Prem Nazir.

== Reception ==
The film collected a, then record of Rs.35 lakhs gross in the first week itself. In 1990, Director Priyadarshan canned a fight scene between Mohanlal and Disco Shanti in a cave, was much appreciated for its technical brilliance.
