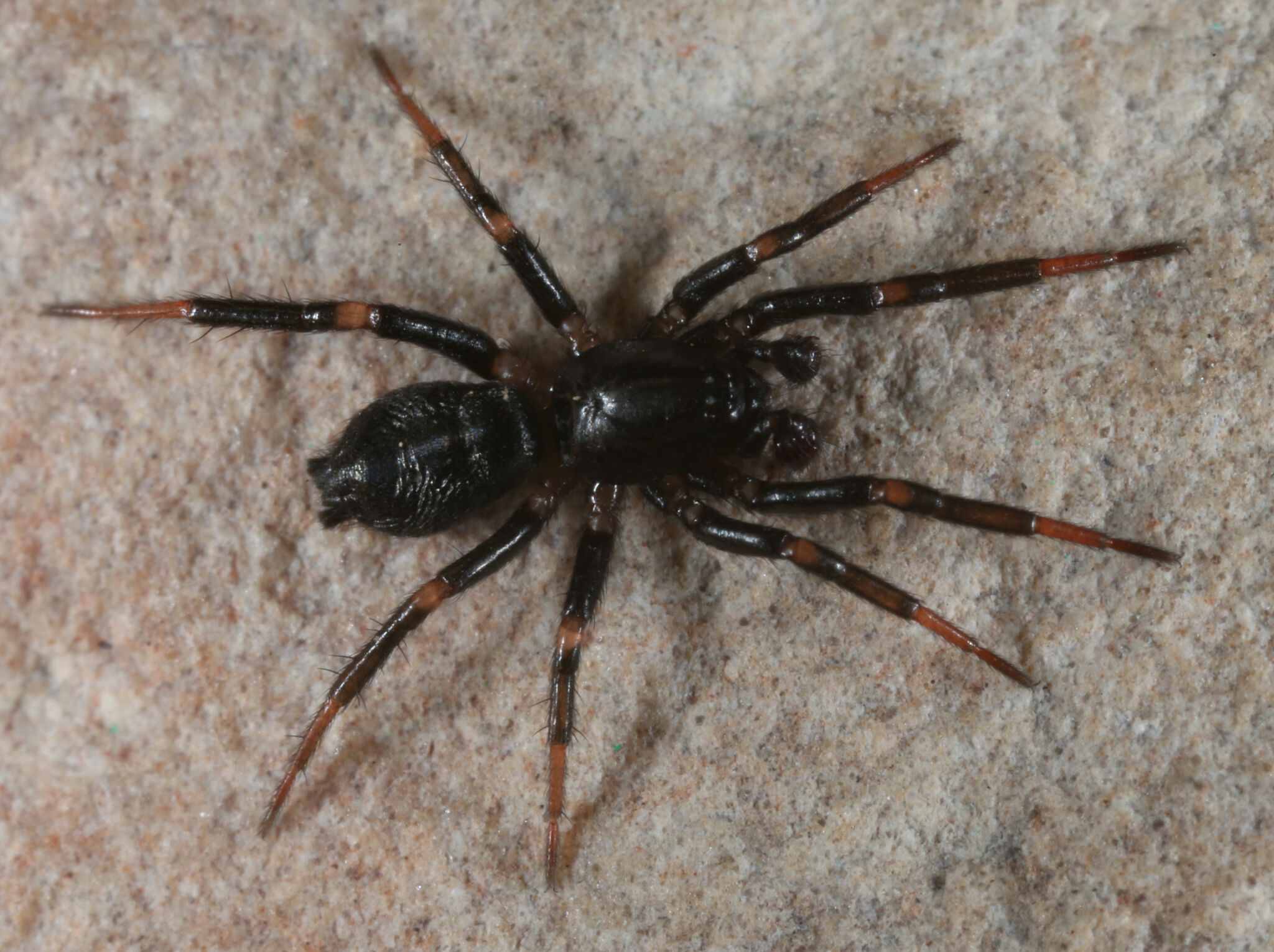

Scientific classification
- Domain: Eukaryota
- Kingdom: Animalia
- Phylum: Arthropoda
- Subphylum: Chelicerata
- Class: Arachnida
- Order: Araneae
- Infraorder: Araneomorphae
- Family: Gnaphosidae
- Genus: Eilica
- Species: E. bicolor

Binomial name
- Eilica bicolor Banks, 1896

= Eilica bicolor =

Species of spider

Eilica bicolor is a species of ground spider in the family Gnaphosidae. It is found from the United States to Honduras, Cuba, and Jamaica.
