= Eilica fusca =

Scientific classification
- Kingdom: Animalia
- Phylum: Arthropoda
- Subphylum: Chelicerata
- Class: Arachnida
- Order: Araneae
- Infraorder: Araneomorphae
- Family: Gnaphosidae
- Genus: Eilica
- Species: E. fusca

Binomial name
- Eilica fusca Platnick, 1975

Species of spider

Eilica fusca is a species of spider in the family Gnaphosidae. It is endemic to the Eastern Cape of South Africa.

== Distribution ==
Eilica fusca is known from the Eastern Cape province of South Africa, recorded from Dunbrody (southeast of Kirkwood) and Addo Elephant National Park.

== Habitat and ecology ==
The species is a free-living ground dweller sampled from the Thicket biome at 66 m above sea level.

== Description ==
Eilica fusca is known only from the female. The carapace is dark brown, the abdomen is dark grey without a pattern, and the legs are uniform dark brown. Total size is 4.2 mm.

== Conservation ==
Eilica fusca is listed as Data Deficient for taxonomic reasons. The species is known only from the type locality based on a single specimen collected in 1958. It is protected in Addo Elephant National Park. More sampling is needed to collect males and determine the species' range.

== Taxonomy ==
The species was originally described by Norman I. Platnick in 1975 from Dunbrody in the Eastern Cape.
