= Angadipuram Laterite =

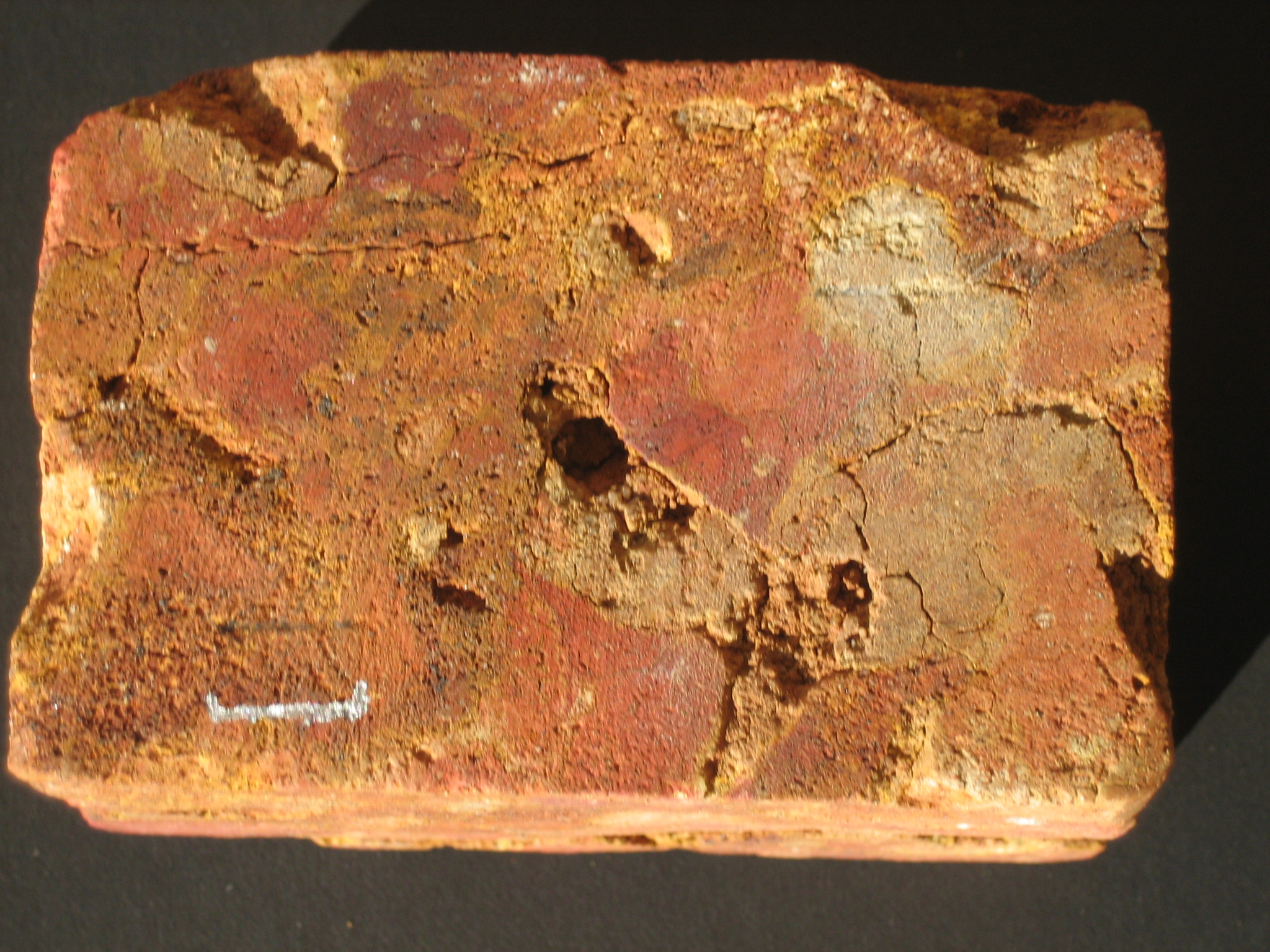

- Location within Kerala
- Coordinates: 10.98°N 76.19°E
- Location: Angadipuram, Malappuram district, Kerala, India

National Geological Monuments of India
- Official name: Angadipuram Laterite
- Designated: 1979
- Designated by: Geological Survey of India

Laterite is a rock type found in the tropical region. The term laterite was coined by Francis Buchanan-Hamilton in 1807 based on his observations on the rock type found near Angadipuram, Malappuram district, Kerala. It is a type of secondary residual product resulting from the chemical weathering of varied rock types. It is economically significant for its mineral deposits and is also used as bricks in construction. Angadipuram Laterite was declared as a National Geological Monument by the Geological Survey of India in 1979.

== Description ==
The term laterite was coined by Francis Buchanan-Hamilton in 1807 based on his observations on the rock type found near Angadipuram. It is found across the tropics, and occurs in the midland regions and highlands of Kerala. It is found at elevations up to 2,000 m (6,600 ft), although it is found in lower altitudes ranging 50–150 m (160–490 ft) in the coastal and midland regions. The laterite occurs as a capping over various rock types, and the laterite cappings vary in thickness ranging from 5 to 8 m (16 to 26 ft) to 50 m (160 ft) in some regions with the plateaus having a greater thickness of laterite. The laterite layer is overlaid by a 14–20 cm (5.5–7.9 in) thick layer of alluvium in certain areas, and is separated from the parent rocks by a bauxite layer in Southern Kerala. Angadipuram Laterite was declared as a National Geological Monument by the Geological Survey of India in 1979.

== Geology ==
Laterite is a secondary residual product resulting from the weathering of parent rocks and the chemical characteristics of the laterite are dependent on the intensity of chemical weathering and the structure of the parent rocks. Laterite occurs extensively over crystalline rocks of the Archean period and sedimentary rocks of the Tertiary period. Laterite developed over crystalline rocks is generally compact, with a moderately indurated dark-brown top crust grading downward into pink and buff-coloured soft laterite. Quartz veins, joints and fractures extend through the laterite layer. Laterite formed over pyroxene and gneisses retain relict foliation corresponding to the underlying rocks, indicating their in-situ nature, while laterite formed over ultramafic rocks commonly exhibits a porous and spongy texture. Laterite developed over sedimentary rocks is indurated at the top for about 2–5 m (6 ft 7 in – 16 ft 5 in), grading downward into soft laterite with remnants of gritstone and finally into variegated clay. Angadipuram laterite is derived from acid charnockite rocks.

== Economic uses ==
Laterites have economic significance as they are associated with deposits of bauxite, iron, and nickel ores. The laterites developed in and around Angadipuram are widely quarried and used extensively as bricks in construction. However, the mining of the laterite poses a major threat to these deposits. Laterite soil is humus and essential plant nutrients with several spices grown on them.
