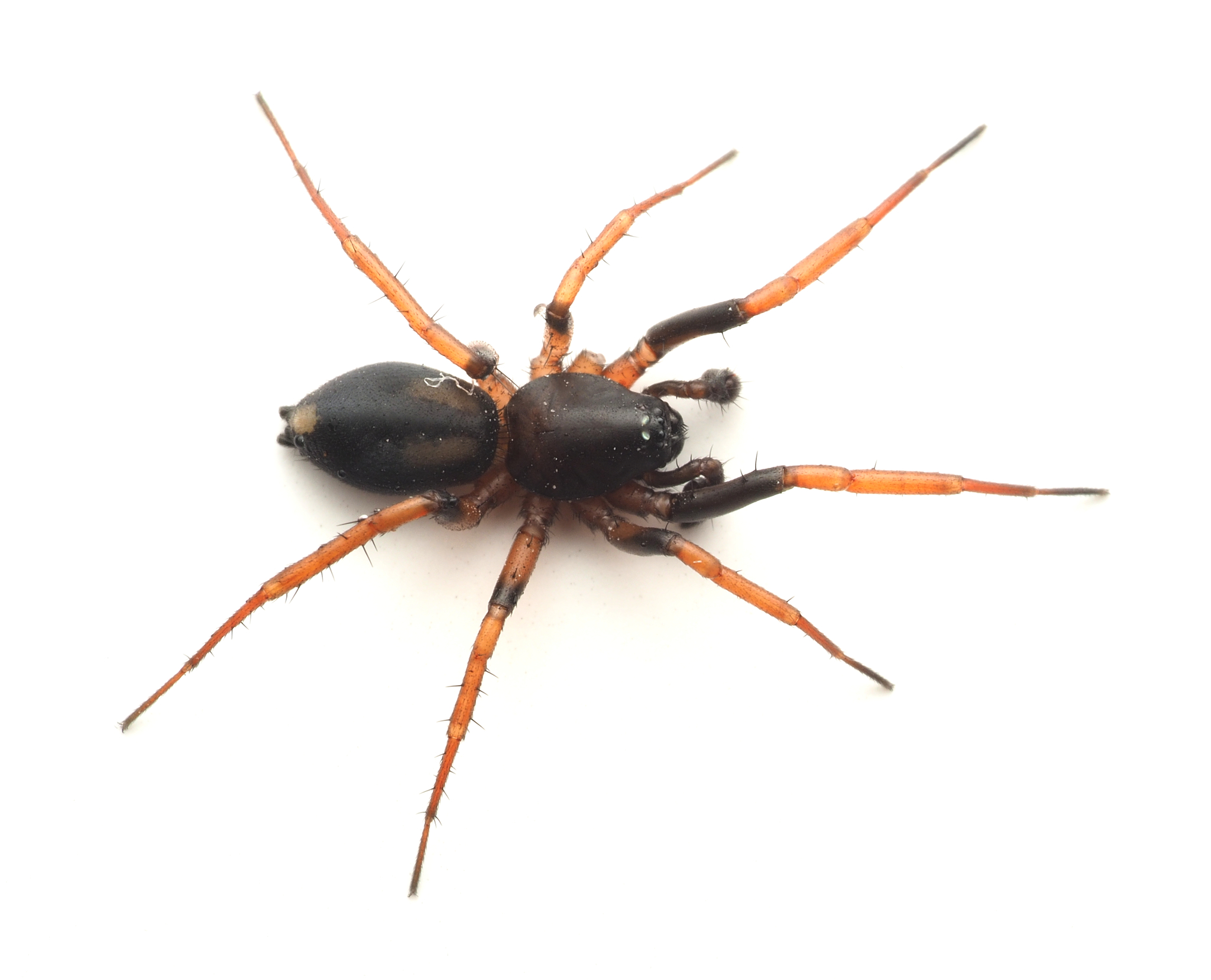
- E. mullaroo from Australia
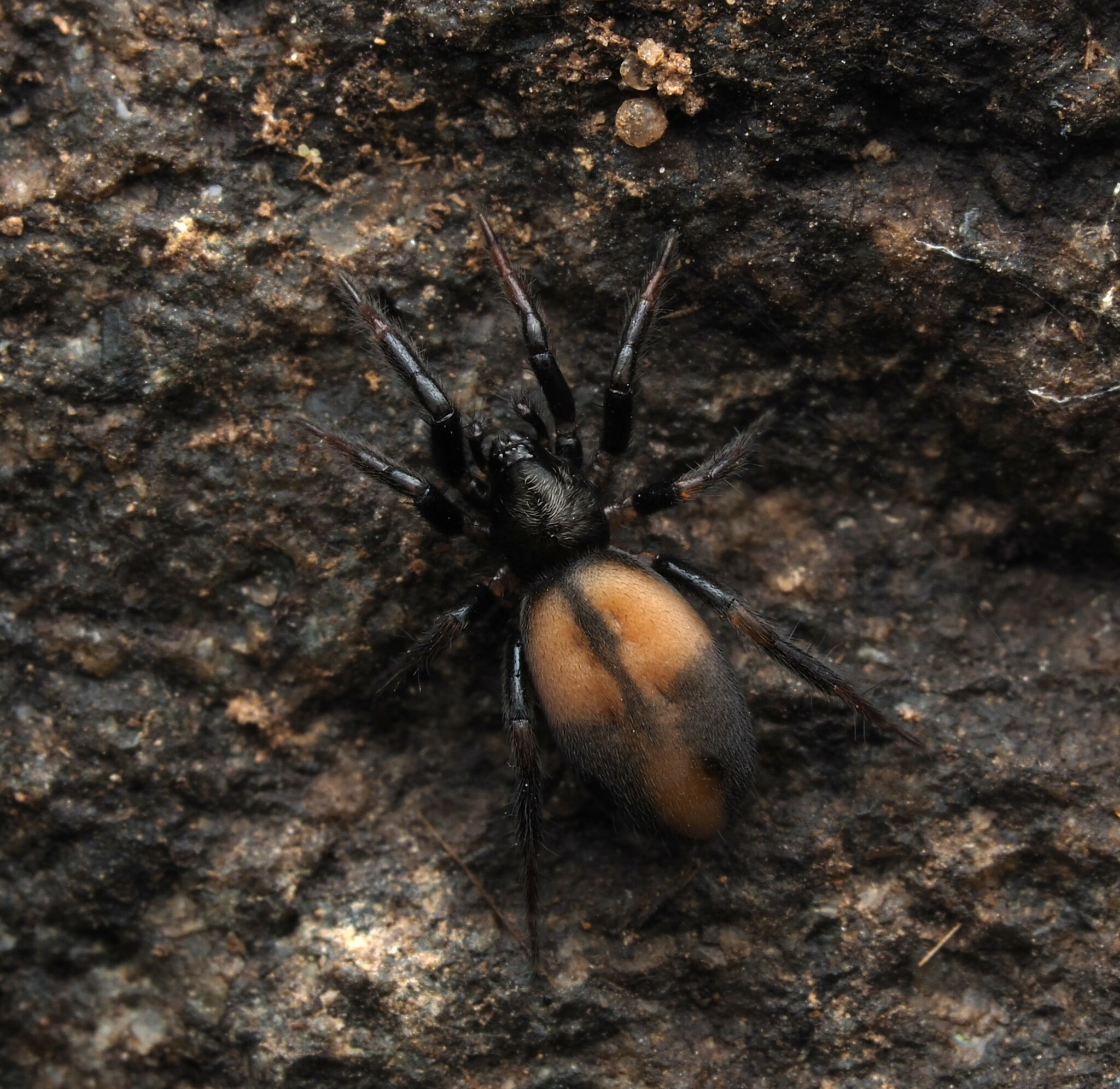
- Eilica albopunctata

Scientific classification
- Kingdom: Animalia
- Phylum: Arthropoda
- Subphylum: Chelicerata
- Class: Arachnida
- Order: Araneae
- Infraorder: Araneomorphae
- Family: Gnaphosidae
- Genus: Eilica; Keyserling, 1891

Type species
- E. modesta Keyserling, 1891

Species
- 28, see text

Synonyms
- Caridrassus Bryant, 1940; Gnaphosoides Hogg, 1896; Gytha Keyserling, 1891; Laronia Simon, 1893

= Eilica =

Genus of spiders

Eilica is a genus of ground spiders that was first described by Eugen von Keyserling in 1891.

== Description ==
Spiders of the genus Eilica have a total length of 2.2-7.8 mm. The carapace is oval in dorsal view, widest at coxae II, flattened, and narrowed anteriorly. The coloration ranges from light orange to dark brown. The cephalic area is not elevated and the thoracic groove is short and longitudinal.

The anterior eye row is usually only slightly procurved while the posterior row is slightly recurved. The posterior median eyes are irregularly rectangular while other eyes are circular. Lateral eyes are larger than medians. The labium is elongate and spear-shaped. The sternum is rounded and strongly bordered, not extending between coxae IV. The abdomen is light brown to black, longer than wide, with a shiny anterior scutum in males and often a distinct pattern of light spots. The leg formula is 4123.

Eilica may be easily recognized by the two or three translucent laminae found on the cheliceral retromargin and the anteriorly produced chelicerae and convergent endites.

== Species ==
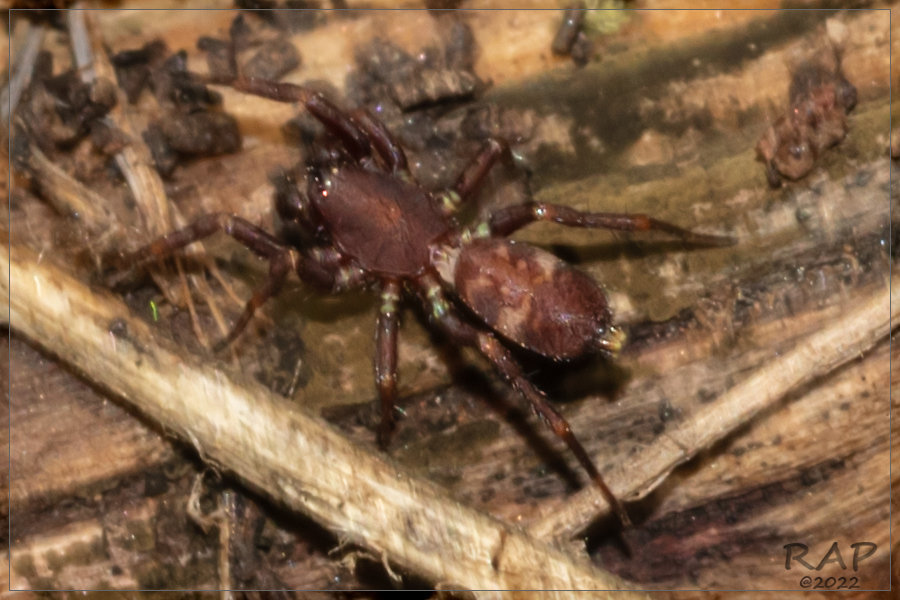
Eilica sp. from Argentina

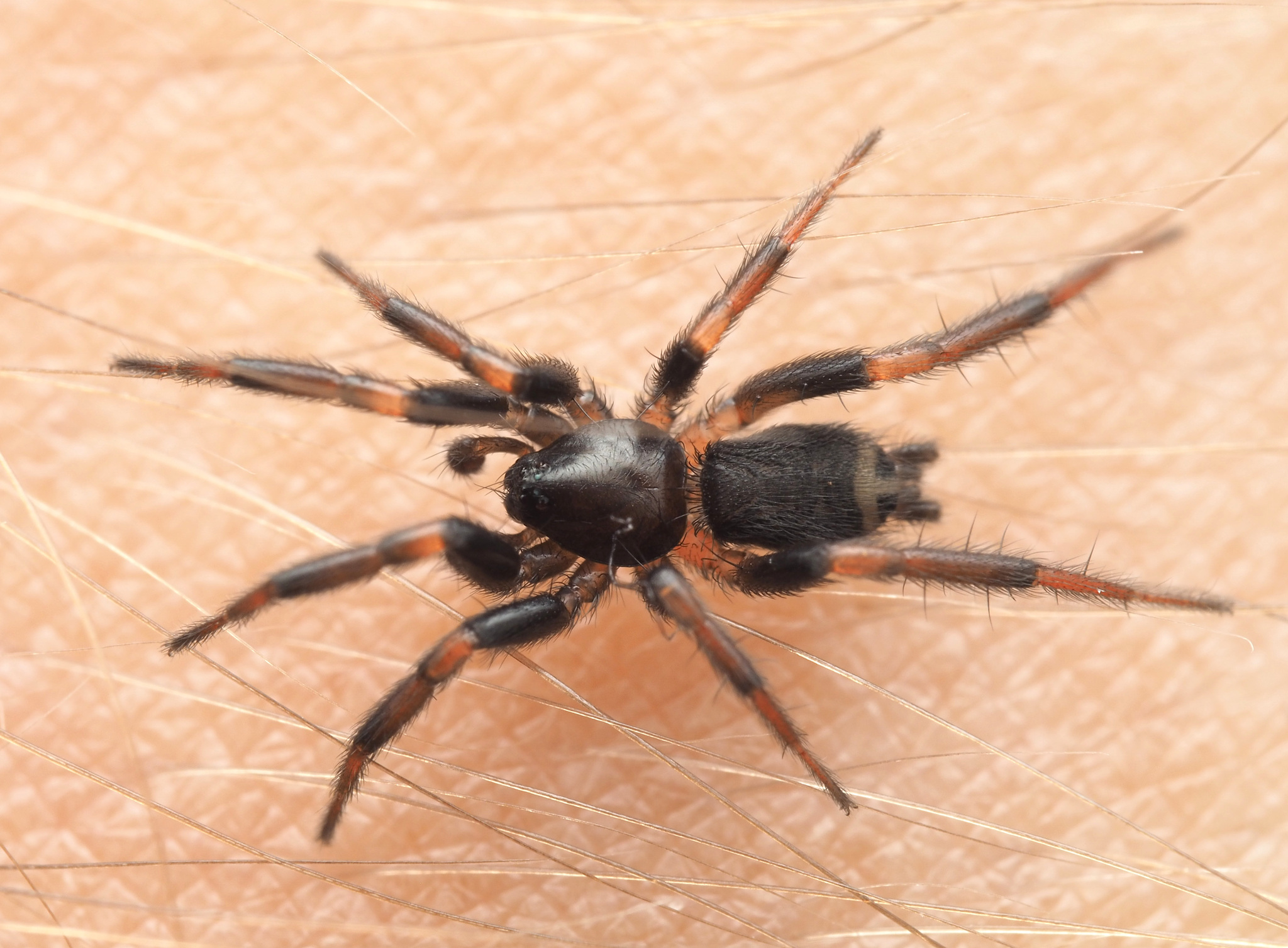
Eilica sp. from Australia

As of September 2025, this genus includes 28 species:

- Eilica albopunctata (Hogg, 1896) – Australia (South Australia, Queensland)
- Eilica amambay Platnick, 1985 – Brazil, Paraguay
- Eilica bedourie Platnick, 1985 – Australia (Queensland)
- Eilica bicolor Banks, 1896 – United States, Honduras, Cuba, Jamaica
- Eilica bonda Müller, 1987 – Colombia
- Eilica chickeringi Platnick, 1975 – Panama
- Eilica cincta (Simon, 1893) – West, Central Africa
- Eilica contacta Platnick, 1975 – Australia (Queensland, New South Wales)
- Eilica daviesae Platnick, 1985 – Australia (Queensland)
- Eilica fusca Platnick, 1975 – South Africa
- Eilica giga FitzPatrick, 1994 – Zimbabwe
- Eilica kandarpae Nigam & Patel, 1996 – India
- Eilica lotzi FitzPatrick, 2002 – South Africa
- Eilica maculipes (Vellard, 1925) – Brazil
- Eilica marchantaria Brescovit & Höfer, 1993 – Brazil
- Eilica modesta Keyserling, 1891 – Brazil, Uruguay, Argentina (type species)
- Eilica mullaroo Platnick, 1988 – Australia (Victoria)
- Eilica myrmecophila (Simon, 1903) – Peru, Argentina
- Eilica obscura (Keyserling, 1891) – Brazil
- Eilica platnicki Tikader & Gajbe, 1977 – India
- Eilica pomposa Medan, 2001 – Brazil, Argentina
- Eilica rotunda Platnick, 1975 – Australia (Queensland)
- Eilica rufithorax (Simon, 1893) – Venezuela, Brazil
- Eilica serrata Platnick, 1975 – Australia (Queensland, Western Australia)
- Eilica songadhensis Patel, 1988 – India
- Eilica tikaderi Platnick, 1976 – India
- Eilica trilineata (Mello-Leitão, 1941) – Argentina, Chile, Brazil
- Eilica uniformis (Schiapelli & Gerschman, 1942) – Argentina
