= Gita Johar =

Gita Johar has served as Senior Vice Dean and is currently the Meyer Feldberg Professor of Business at Columbia Business School, Columbia University. She is known for her research in the field of Consumer behavior, particularly in the area of consumer inference making in advertising and communication. In 2006, she was appointed the Meyer Feldberg Professor of Business at Columbia Business School. Johar has been the Senior Vice Dean, the Vice Dean for Research and the Vice Dean for Diversity, Equity and Inclusion at Columbia Business School, and received the Service to the Doctoral Program Award at Columbia Business School in 2023, the Columbia University Faculty Service Award in 2024, the American Marketing Association Consumer Behavior Special Interest Group (AMA CBSIG) Lifetime Achievement Award in 2025, and the Fellow Award from the Society for Consumer Psychology (SCP) in 2025. The Fellow Award is SCP’s highest honor and recognizes scholars who have made “outstanding and unusual contributions to consumer psychology, through both research and service."

== Academic career ==
Johar is a graduate of IIM Calcutta and she received the Distinguished Alumnus Award from the institute in 2019. In her doctoral thesis at the Stern School of Business, New York University, Johar focused on the role of consumer involvement in drawing false inferences from advertisements (deceptive advertising). She joined Columbia University in 1992, received tenure in 2000, became a full professor in 2002 and was appointed the Meyer Feldberg Professor of Marketing (a named chair) in 2006.

Johar served as the president of the Society for Consumer Psychology from 2022-2023 and organized the SCP Climate Change Challenge boutique conference in 2023. She has served as co-editor of the Journal of Consumer Research and as editor of a Journal of Marketing special issue on Better Marketing for a Better World (BMBW), and co-founded the BMBW initiative.

== Research ==
Much of Johar's research deals with the way people interpret messages and on how attributes of the source and characteristics of the message can affect the way a recipient interprets the message. In one series of studies, she shows that people with baby-faces (rounder facial characteristics) are considered to be more honest while people with mature faces are considered to be more competent. This research has implications in a variety of situations, from companies in crisis to the messages of presidential candidates. She also applies a psychological lens to understand when and why misinformation impacts consumer beliefs and the effectiveness of proposed remedies. This research suggests that misinformation is hard to combat. For example, she shows that people are less likely to fact-check information when they are on social media and feel they are in the presence of others.
