= P. Geetha =

Indian feminist writer and critic

- Born: Angadipuram, Malappuram district, Kerala
- Occupation(s): Feminist Writer, critic
- Spouse: P. Pavithran
- Children: 2
- Parents: P. C. Parameswaran (father); P. S. Padmini (mother)
- Awards: Kerala Sahitya Akademi Award; Kerala Film Critics Award; Kerala State film Award

P. Geetha is an Indian writer, critic and feminist activist from Kerala. Her work titled Kannadikal Udaykkunnathenthinu (കണ്ണാടികൾ ഉടക്കുന്നതെന്തിന്)is considered as the first feminist critical study book in Malayalam language. She received many awards including the Kuttippuzha Endowment Award from Kerala Sahitya Akademi, Kerala Film Critics Award and the Kerala State film Award.

== Biography ==
P. Geetha was born in Angadipuram, Malappuram district to P.S. Padmini and P. C. Parameswaran. She has served as a Malayalam teacher at Madappally Government College, Malappuram Government College, and Pattambi Sree Neelakantha Sanskrit College.

Her husband P. Pavithran is an activist, literary critic and Malayalam teacher at Kalady Sanskrit University. They have two children, Aparna Prashanthi and Atul P. She currently lives in her house in Angadipuram, Malappuram.

== Activism ==
Geetha writes and speaks continuously in feminist and other social issues. She have faced various forms of humiliation from society because of her stances. She filed a police complaint against the people around her who are continuously making obscene remarks, saying that she is not performing her daughter's wedding and does not know how to respect men.

== Contributions ==
Geetha, who began writing in Mathrubhumi's children's literature section and the Nava tharangam in 1973, became notable in feminist criticism in the nineties. Her critical study book in Malayalam titled Kannadikal Udaykkunnatgenthunu is considered as the first feminist critical study book in Malayalam.

Geetha received a doctorate from University of Calicut for her research on the topic of 'Feminist Approach in Modern Malayalam Poetry'. Along with her feminist writings, she has published a novel titled Ammakkallu, with the main character Gandhari, and three collections of stories.

== Books published ==
- Sthree Vimochanamenneal Manushya Vimochanam [Women's liberation means human liberation.] (in Malayalam). Eye books. 2023. ISBN 9789393052179.
- Devabhoothikal Manjupovath [The gods have disappeared.] (in Malayalam). Eye books. 2023. ISBN 9789387828643. A study book that explores how women's realities and perceptions are recorded.
- Cinemayude Kayyettangal [Cinema's encroachments.] (in Malayalam). Eye books. 2023. ISBN 9789393052148.
- Malayalathinte Vellithira [Silver screen of Malayalam.] (in Malayalam). Eye books. 2023. ISBN 9789387828650. A study book that explores how women have appeared on the Malayalam silver screen, using some popular films as examples.
- Aan Tachukal [Male creations.] (in Malayalam). Eye books. 2020. ISBN 9780000148995. A comprehensive study of M. T.'s screenplays from a feminist perspective.
- Aaryamakilumanaryakilum (in Malayalam). Eye books. 2023. ISBN 9789393052087. Literary criticism
- 1921 Charithra Vartgamanangal [1921 Historical perspectives.] (in Malayalam). Current. 2015. ISBN 9789387828636. This is a historical study that reclaims the lives of women who were ignored and excluded in the history of the 1921 Malabar Rebellion.
- Athirthikalile Ashareerikal [Voices at the borders] (in Malayalam). Eye books. 2023. ISBN 9789393052094.
- Irikkano Marikkano [To sit or die?] (in Malayalam). Eye books. 2023. ISBN 9789393052100. Criticism.
- Pranayam Laingikatha Adhikaram [Love, sex, power] (in Malayalam). Eye books. 2023. ISBN 9789393052100. Criticism.
- Kathakaliymmamar [Mothers in Kathakali] (in Malayalam). Eye books. 2023. ISBN 9780000145345.
- Seethayile Seetha [Seetha in Seetha] (in Malayalam). Kerala Bhasha Institute. 2023. ISBN 9788176386357.
- K R Gouri yammayum Keralavum [K. R. Gowri Amma and Kerala] (in Malayalam). Current Books. 2023. ISBN 9789386429865.
- Atheetha Sakshyangal [Transcendental Testimonies] (in Malayalam). Current Books. 2020. ISBN 9789386429957. This book is a frank account of queer lives in Kerala.
- Mararude Ezhuthile Ammavazhikal [The motherly things in Marar's writings] (in Malayalam). Marar Sahitya Prakasan. 2017. ISBN 9780000123565.
- Ezhuthammamar [Mothers in literature] (in Malayalam). Kerala Bhasha Institute. 2014. ISBN 9788176389419.
- Theeyezhthukal [Fire writings] (in Malayalam). Kerala Bhasha Institute. 2016. ISBN 9788120039124.
- Pettunovum Eettupunyavum (in Malayalam). Eye books. 2023. ISBN 9789393052094.
- Kannadikal Udaykkunnathenthinu [Why breaking mirrors] (in Malayalam). Current Books. 1997.
- Penkalangal [Girls' periods] (in Malayalam). Current Books. 2010.
- Adhunika Malayala Kavithayile Sthreepaksha Sameepanangal [Feminist approaches in modern Malayalam poetry] (in Malayalam). Calicut University: Department of Malayalam - Kerala Studies, 1995.; Lipi Publications, Kozhikode, 2002. 1995.
- Sthreevaadathinte Kerala Parisaram [The Kerala context of feminism] (in Malayalam). Eye books. 2023. ISBN 9789393052117.
- Ammakkallu (in Malayalam). Eye books. 2023. ISBN 9789387828353. A novel based on the epic Mahabharata.
- Geethayude Sampoornna Kathakal (in Malayalam). Eye books. 2019. ISBN 9789387828384. Short story collection.

== Awards and honors ==
In 1998, Her critical study Kannadikal Udaykkunnathenthunu received the Kuttippuzha Endowment Award from Kerala Sahithya Akademi. In 2024, she received the first K. Saraswathi Amma Award, instituted by WINGS (Women's Integration and Growth Through Sports) Kerala, for feminist studies, for her criticism work Aan Thachukal (meaning: male creations) on M.T. Vasudevan Nair's scripts. She has also received many awards including the Thayattu Award for the best poetic literary criticism in 1998, the Lalithambika Antharjanam Memorial Award for the best young critic, the Kerala Film Critics Award, the Samskarika Keralam Award, the Kerala State film Award, the Muthukulam Parvathy Amma Award, the C.N. Ahmed Moulavi Award, and the P.K.D. Memorial Literary Award.
