= Nizhalgal =

1980 film by Bharathiraja

- Theatrical release poster
- Directed by: Bharathirajaa
- Screenplay by: Bharathirajaa
- Story by: Manivannan
- Produced by: P. Jayarajaa; S. P. Sigamani
- Starring: Rajasekaran; Rohini; Ravi; Chandrasekhar
- Cinematography: B. Kannan
- Edited by: Chandy
- Music by: Ilaiyaraaja
- Production company: Manoj Creations
- Release date: 6 November 1980
- Running time: 117 minutes
- Country: India
- Language: Tamil

Nizhalgal (pronounced [n̪iɻalɡaɭ] transl. Shadows) is a 1980 Indian Tamil-language drama film co-written and directed by Bharathirajaa. The film stars newcomers S. Rajasekar (credited as Rajasekaran), Raadhu (credited as Rohini), Ravi and Chandrasekhar. It revolves around a group of youngsters and their struggles to overcome the challenges faced by them in society.

The film's crew contained a host of newcomers, including the lyricist Vairamuthu and Manivannan, both would later go on to become an established lyricist and a director respectively. It was released on 6 November 1980. Though a commercial failure, the film received critical acclaim and was screened at the "Indian Panorama" section of the International Film Festival of India in 1981. The same year it won two awards at the Tamil Nadu State Film Awards.

== Plot ==
Gopi and Hari, two unemployed graduates, share a room in Madras. While Gopi is looking for a job, Hari, a harmonium player, aspires to become a music composer in the film industry. They both manage to make ends meet with the help of their friends. Their neighbour is Prabhu, a college student who spends all his time smoking, painting, and singing. A new family relocates to their apartment. The couple has a daughter, Mahalakshmi. Prabhu and Maha both study in the same college and become good friends. Prabhu decides to apprentice under a veena exponent, who dies before Prabhu can join the class.

Gopi gives tuition to Maha, and they fall in love. During this time, Gopi, Hari, and Prabhu get arrested for different reasons. Maha pledges her necklace and bails them out. In an attempt to reform, Prabhu meets his college principal but gets dismissed from the college after impulsively slapping him for extinguishing his cigarette on a flower. Prabhu's father scolds him, but Maha supports him, leading Prabhu to assume that she loves him. During this time, Maha's parents force her to discontinue her tuition as some of their relatives suspect she and Gopi are in a relationship. Hari gets a break in films and receives an advance payment from the producers. Using the sum, they return Maha's necklace. By this time, Maha's parents start looking for a groom for her.

Maha meets Gopi and advises him to find a job so that they can marry. Meanwhile, Hari is dropped from the film because the film's financier does not want a new, untested music composer. Gopi and Hari are evicted from their room for failing to pay rent and seek shelter with Mani, a rickshaw puller. Gopi gets a telegram informing him that his father is dead. To bear Gopi's travel expenses, Mani's son Singam goes out but meets with an accident. Hari tries to make money by becoming a street performer but fails. Gopi approaches a moneylender to borrow money for Singam's treatment. The moneylender talks ill about Singam, angering Gopi into stabbing him and taking his money. When Gopi returns, Singam is already dead.

Meanwhile, Maha's parents arrange a marriage for her. When she meets Prabhu, he confesses his love for her. A shocked Maha informs him that she never loved him, only Gopi. Prabhu is disappointed and feels that life has betrayed him at every turn. He tries to molest Maha, but stops when she takes a knife and threatens to kill herself. Prabhu feels guilty, so he takes the knife and stabs himself to death. By this time, Gopi arrives at Maha's house and informs her that he has killed the moneylender for money. They both decide to take the next step and are married immediately. The next day, they are arrested for the deaths of Prabhu and the moneylender, while Hari throws his harmonium into the sea, laughs hysterically, and runs amok.

== Cast ==
- Rajasekaran as Prabhu
- Rohini as Mahalakshmi (Maha)
- Ravi as Gopi
- Chandrasekhar as Hari
- Suvitha as Poongothai
- Charuhasan as the veena exponent
- Manivannan as Mani
- Janagaraj as the moneylender
- K. K. Soundar as Gopi's father
- Master Haja Sheriff as Singam
- Rasi Ramasamy as Maha's father
- Ilaiyaraaja (special appearance)
- R. K. Kumar (special appearance)
- R. Purusothaman (special appearance in the song "Madai Thiranthu")

== Production ==
Manivannan joined Bharathiraja's unit as an assistant in the film. He scripted the story and co-wrote the film with Bharathiraja. The film's cast, principal cast in particular – Ravi, Chandrasekhar, Raadhu, and Rajasekar – mostly featured newcomers. Raadhu was credited as Rohini, and Rajasekar as Rajasekaran. Ravi was earlier asked to audition for Bharathiraja's Niram Maratha Pookkal (1979) as a dubbing artist for the lead character. However, since Bharathiraja himself dubbed for character, Ravi was dropped. Bharathiraaja, however, signed up Ravi for Nizhalgal as the lead actor, thus marking Ravi's cinematic debut. Bharathiraja cast Rajasekar because he liked his eyes. Some outdoor scenes were filmed in Mekkarai, Tamil Nadu.

== Soundtrack ==
The music was composed by Ilaiyaraaja. The song "Ithu Oru Pon Malai" was written by Vairamuthu, making his cinematic debut. He got the starting lines ready within 30 minutes. The song is set in Kedaram raga, while "Poongathave" is set in Mayamalavagowla. Manivannan wrote a stanza of "Madai Thiranthu" but insisted that Vaali be the sole credited lyricist. The rock and roll song was later remixed by Yogi B and Natchatra in their album Vallavan. Ilaiyaraaja later reused "Dhoorathil Naan Kanda" as "Vennello Godari" for the Telugu film Sitaara (1984). A remix version of "Ithu Oru Pon Malai" is featured on music artist M. Rafi's album Aasaiyae Alaipolae.

Track listing
| No. | Title | Lyrics | Singer(s) | Length |
|---|---|---|---|---|
| 1. | "Ithu Oru Pon Malai" | Vairamuthu | S. P. Balasubrahmanyam | 4:18 |
| 2. | "Dhoorathil Naan Kanda Un Mugam" | Panchu Arunachalam | S. Janaki | 5:04 |
| 3. | "Madai Thiranthu" | Vaali | S. P. Balasubrahmanyam | 4:21 |
| 4. | "Poongathavae Thaal Thiravai" | Gangai Amaran | Deepan Chakravarthy, Uma Ramanan | 4:20 |
| Total length: | | | | 18:03 |

== Release and reception ==
Nizhalgal was released on 6 November 1980 alongside Varumayin Niram Sivappu, with both films having the theme of unemployment. Radhakrishnan of Kalki praised the performances of newcomers as natural, Ilaiyaraaja's music and cinematography as colourful and concluded by calling direction as the reality of life as shadow. Naagai Dharuman of Anna praised the music, acting, cinematography, dialogues and direction but criticised Bharathiraja for using too many symbolic shots. Although the film's story, music and the performance of the cast members received critical acclaim, it failed at the box office, with Bharathiraja feeling the audience rejected the film due to its ending, and like Varumayin Niram Sivappu it should have conveyed some optimism.

== Accolades ==
At the Tamil Nadu State Film Awards (1981), Nizhalgal won two awards – Best Music Director (for Ilaiyaraaja) and Best Male Playback Singer (for S. P. Balasubrahmanyam). At the International Film Festival of India in 1981, Nizhalgal was one of the 21 films to be screened at the Indian Panorama section. It was one of the two Tamil films to be screened at the festival; the other being Doorathu Idi Muzhakkam which was released the same year.

== Legacy ==
Made in the neo-realistic style, the film was a different attempt by Bharathiraja. The French film critic Yves Thoraval in his The cinemas of India stated: "a gloomy and violent film despite musical scenes with pretty dancers in short skirts." After the film's release, the name "Nizhalgal" was added to Ravi's name as a prefix. In 2008, short filmmaker R. V. Ramani in an interview with The Hindu recalled Nizhalgal as being a film that made a strong impact on him. He further called the film as a pathbreaking one in Tamil cinema. In a 2015 interview, Bharathiraja noted that he had to return to mainstream filmmaking due to the financial failure of Nizhalgal.

== Bibliography ==
- Dhananjayan, G. (2014). Pride of Tamil Cinema: 1931–2013. Blue Ocean Publishers. OCLC 898765509.
- Thoraval, Yves (2000). The cinemas of India. Macmillan India. ISBN 978-0-333-93410-4.
