= Raadhu (actress) =

Indian actress (born 1964)

- Born: Radica Ranganath; Mumbai, Maharashtra, India
- Occupations: Actress, Bharathanatyam dancer and teacher
- Years active: 1980–1986

Raadhu, born in Mumbai, India as Radica Ranganath, is an Indian actress who has done a few Tamil-language and Malayalam-language Indian films of the eighties. Even though she had made a good name as an actress, she quit the industry to pursue a life outside films.

== Career ==
Raadhu had a brief stint in Malayalam and Tamil films in the eighties. She started her career in Tamil with Nizhalgal directed by Bharathiraja. After that, she acted in Ennu Nathante Nimmi with Mammootty & Rahman and the long delayed traditional Vadakkanpattu film Kadathanadan Ambadi with Mohanlal.

Soon, Radica was married, and began her work in the software industry. With the struggle of two growing kids, Radica, now Radica Giri decided it was best to leave her job and pursue her deep passion in Bharathanatyam, mentored by A Lakshmanaswamy. Having already learned and performed 2 arangetrams, Radica Giri opened her very own dance studio, Anjali Natyam School of Dance. Today, she teaches over 40 students, and has successfully finished the arangetram of over a dozen and a young women.

Radica Giri's maiden dance / theatre production "Chitrangada", a slice from the Mahabharata, won accolades.

== Filmography ==
As actress

Year	Film	Role	Language	Ref.
1980	Nizhalgal	Mahalakshmi	Tamil	
1986	Ennu Nathante Nimmi	Nirmala	Malayalam	
1988	Oruvar Vaazhum Aalayam	Saradha	Tamil	
1990	Kadathanadan Ambadi	Kunjulakshmi	Malayalam	
