= National Transport Development Policy Committee (India) =

The National Transport Development Policy Committee (NTDPC) was formed by the Government of India in 2010. It was formulated to create a policy environment in order to provide an integrated and sustainable transport system. Dr. Rakesh Mohan is the chairman of the committee. It submitted its report at the end of February 2014. The committee emphasized that India needs to have a single unified transport ministry with a clear mandate to deliver a multi-modal transport system. It also recommended establishment of Office of Transport Strategy (OTS) at the national level. The report also included recommendations for setting up of Indian Institute of Information Technology in Transportation (IIITT).
