= Yogi Gita =

Collection of spiritual teachings of Yogiji Maharaj

Yogi Gita, literally meaning “Yogi’s song” (From the Sanskrit root geet), refers to a collection of spiritual teachings and prayers of Yogiji Maharaj, the fourth spiritual successor to Swaminarayan. The Yogi Gita encapsulates the necessary attributes one must imbibe in order to progress spiritually and become Brahmarup or attaining the highest level of spiritual enlightenment. The Yogi Gita contains invaluable interpretations of Swaminarayan's teachings from the Vachanamrut. This, too, provides an expansive view of the Akshar-Purushottam Darshan, the doctrinal foundation of BAPS philosophy.

The Yogi Gita begins with a letter from Yogiji Maharaj to a devout follower and Prarthana or prayer offered in Mahelav, Gujarat. The Yogi Gita continues with the Jivan Bhavna, a collection of Yogiji Maharaj's life philosophy and guidance, and the Hrudayni Vato, a collection of words of wisdom.

== Origins ==
The Yogi Gita consists of a letter which was written over a period of three days, from 28 March to 1 April 1941, as well as a prayer said at Shastriji Maharaj's birthplace 9 December 1966. In 1940, Yogiji Maharaj came down with a severe case of dysentery in Rajkot. When Shastriji Maharaj, his guru, heard of Yogiji Maharaj's plight, he sent an attendant named Jagjivan Ruda Poriya to nurse Yogiji Maharaj back to health. Upon Yogiji Maharaj's full recovery, Jagjivan asked to be sent off with Yogiji Maharaj's spiritual wisdom as “reward” for his efforts. In response to the request, Yogiji Maharaj wrote the letter that would later become a part of the Yogi Gita.

== Sections ==
=== Letter to a Satsangi ===
In his letter to Jagjivan. the "satsangi," Yogiji Maharaj reinforced the importance of three basic qualities: Samp or cooperation, Suhradhaybhav or friendship, and Ekta or unity, and indicated that all devotees should strive to live by these principles. Yogiji Maharaj also described the following principles that he believed would lead to eternal peace and happiness:

- Service, Humility and Attaining Moksha: Yogiji Maharaj stressed the importance of Atmanishta or believing oneself to be the soul as one of the pre-requisites to attaining liberation. The values of faithfulness and total surrender to God and his sadhu and his belief that one should live as das no das or the servant of God's servant were also succinctly explained within the section.
- Avoiding Gossip: This short section addresses how gossiping reduces the virtues of an aspirant and is one of the biggest obstacles on the path to liberation.
- Realization of one's Faults: To highlight the need for introspection, Yogiji Maharaj referred to the words of Jaga Bhagat. Yogiji Maharaj wrote that if one begins to look at the faults of other, they should pause and look at their own faults instead.
- Tolerance and Forgiveness: Yogiji Maharaj described these two virtues as amongst the most powerful qualities a spiritual aspirant could have.
- Mutual Affection: Yogiji Maharaj explained the need for a collaborative understanding of various principles.
- Spiritual Discourses: Yogiji Maharaj stated that by constantly listening to spiritual discourses and absorbing the knowledge inherent in them one would experience tranquility and inner happiness.

=== Prarthana ===
The second section contains Yogiji Maharaj's earnest prayer to Shastriji Maharaj while at Mehelav. Yogiji Maharaj used various spiritual qualities of Shastriji Maharaj as examples to illustrate the tenets that devotees should instill in themselves. In essence, Yogiji Maharaj prayed that all devotees could become as virtuous and devout as Shastriji Maharaj.

=== Jivan Bhavna ===
The editors of the text compiled various proverbs of Yogiji Maharaj that encapsulated his insights and philosophy of life.

=== Hrudayni Vato ===
Literally meaning "the sayings of the heart," this section explores numerous sayings and empirical teachings of Yogiji Maharaj. It focuses on the spiritual attributes that are necessary for one to attain liberation. Yogiji Maharaj reinforced the fact that devotees would never suffer from misery if they had a firm refuge in God.

== Importance to BAPS ==
To devotees of the BAPS Swaminarayan sect, the Yogi Gita is an inspirational text that aims to increase the spiritual purity of ordinary believers. Yogiji Maharaj's own virtuous life and esteem in the eyes of BAPS followers give added weight to the teachings present in this work. A theme prevalent throughout the Yogi Gita is the Akshar-Purshottam Darshan and the belief that true spiritual awakening and liberation can be achieved only with the help of a Satpurush – a God-realized soul. In the Yogi Gita, this Satpurush was Shastriji Maharaj. Devotees within the sect often use Yogiji Maharaj's adherence to his guru's principles and intense devoutness as prime examples of how an ideal spiritual life should be led.
