= Geetha Vazhachal =

Adivasi social activist

Geetha Vazhachal is the first woman to become a chieftain of the Kadar tribal community in Vazhachal, Kerala, India. She is an Anganwadi teacher, social activist, and moopathi (chieftain) of the Kadar community who had been working for the upliftment of the Kadars in the Western Ghats region. She played a prominent role in resisting displacement and land rights violations by state development projects such as the Athirappilly Hydroelectric Power Project. She led her community to claim Community Forest Rights under the Forest Rights Act of 2006, which granted them the power to approve or reject projects within their territory.

== Early life and background ==
Born in Vazhachal, by the Chalakudy River in the Thrissur district, Geetha comes from the Kadar community. Her father's family originally hailed from Parambikulam and her mother from Vazhachal. She went to school in Pariyaram at a convent boarding school, and was the first from her colony to pass class 10. She was on vacation at home when she heard about the imminent Athirappilly Hydroelectric Power Project and decided to do something about it. Having spend time with environmentalists like Madhav Gadgil and elders in the Kadar community made her determined to speak up for her people legally.

== Social work ==
Geetha began her career as a teacher in the local Anganwadi at the age of 17. She was a member of the Vana Samrakshana Samiti, a community forest management programme functioning under the Forest Development Agency. She promoted education and founded a library for the local children.

== Environmental activism ==
Geetha has been leading the struggle to protect the Vazhachal region, especially the Chalakudy River and the surrounding forest. Geetha's advocacy came to national prominence through her opposition to the Athirappilly Hydroelectric Power Project proposed on the Chalakudy River. The project threatened to displace numerous Kadar families and submerge over a hundred hectares of pristine forest. She worked to raise awareness, mobilise the community, and engage with legal and governmental channels.

During her tenure, settlements of the Kadar community in Thrissur collectively secured Community Forest Rights (CFR), a measure that contributed to the protection of their ancestral lands from development projects.

== Recognition ==
She is the recipient of P.V. Thampy Memorial Endowment Award.
