= Geet (TikToker) =

Indian social media personality, motivational speaker and lawyer

- Born: Delhi, New Delhi, India
- Occupations: Social media personality (TikToker); Social activist; Lawyer
- Years active: 2015–present
- Known for: TikTok

Geet is an Indian motivational speaker, educator, social activist and former lawyer. She rose to prominence through social media platforms, and gained popularity on the platforms TikTok and Facebook.

== Biography ==
Geet was born in Delhi to a traditional Indian family and was raised in Seattle, Washington, United States. She suffered a major spinal cord injury at the age of 10 in a car accident which left her paralysed. She had initially dreamt of becoming a film actress, but the accident seemed to have dashed those hopes. However, despite her disability, she took part in a reality television show called India's Best Cinestars Ki Khoj on Zee TV. While she did not make it to the final round, she gained the confidence to reignite her dreams of acting.

== Career ==
Having studied engineering and obtaining a doctorate degree in law, Geet worked as a practising lawyer in a law firm in the US before moving to New Delhi with her parents to engage in social service. Quitting her job as a lawyer before the move, she started up an NGO in India focused on helping slum children.

In August 2015, she started posting inspirational motivational stories through her official Facebook account, before venturing into other social media platforms. Geet opened her official TikTok account in February 2019, and started making 15-second videos related to relationships, love, and life. She goes by the name Geet on TikTok. She also started to teach spoken American English to her followers through one of the channels on her TikTok account during the lockdown imposed due to the COVID-19 pandemic in India.

In June 2020, the Indian government banned the use of TikTok in the country due to ongoing tensions with China. As of December 2020, Geet is no longer active on the platform. However, She is active on other social platforms like YouTube and Facebook.
