= Geetam Tiwari =

Indian engineer

Prof. Geetam Tiwari is currently the TRIPP Chair Professor at the Department of Civil Engineering of the Indian Institute of Technology in New Delhi, India.

She teaches transportation planning, traffic engineering, and transport economics and finance, transport safety, and non-motorised transportation to undergraduate and graduate students.

== Education and biography ==
Tiwari finished her Bachelor of Architecture from the then University of Roorkee, Roorkee (currently Indian Institute of Technology Roorkee) in 1980 and worked for a year as Assistant Architect at the Uttar Pradesh State Construction Corporation, in Lucknow. She later attended the School of Urban Planning and Policy, University of Illinois at Chicago, where she earned a Masters in Transport Planning and Policy and later a Ph.D. in Public Policy Analysis (Transport Planning). After serving as visiting faculty in the School of Planning and Architecture, Delhi, and as a consultant, she joined IIT Delhi in 1990 as a Senior Scientific Officer in the Applied Systems Research Programme, which would later be named the [Transportation Research and Injury Prevention Program (TRIPP).

== Professional career ==
Tiwari was appointed an honorary doctor by Chalmers University of Technology, Sweden in 2012, for her research on transport. She and her research group have contributed to knowledge on urban traffic patterns of various vehicles, public health effects in the urban environment, and the relationship between the municipal infrastructure and traffic safety. Their research led to the introduction of Bus Rapid Transit Systems in Delhi and guidelines for the design of highways and streets in urban environments. These have resulted in improved accessibility and traffic safety, as well as fewer emissions of greenhouse gases and less pollution in general. In addition to her teaching and research, Tiwari is one of the directors of Innovative Transport Solutions (iTrans) and is a member of working groups on Urban Transport for the twelfth Five-Year Plan of India and the National Transport Development Policy Committee (NTDPC).

Tiwari has written, edited, and contributed to various books in the field of urban transportation systems, road safety, and injury prevention. These include The Way Forward: Transportation Planning And Road Safety, Injury Prevention and Control Urban transport for growing cities: high capacity bus system, and Road Traffic Injury Prevention: Training Manual. Tiwari has authored and co-authored numerous international peer-reviewed journal articles.
