= Geetham (film) =

- Directed by: Sajan
- Written by: S. N. Swamy (screenplay); Asha Mathew (writer)
- Starring: Mammootty; Geetha
- Cinematography: Anandakuttan
- Edited by: V. P. Krishnan
- Music by: Raveendran
- Release date: 9 October 1986
- Country: India
- Language: Malayalam

Geetham is a 1986 Malayalam film directed by Sajan.

== Cast ==
- Mammootty as Yatheendran
- Mohanlal as Jagadeesh Nair(Guest Appearance)
- Geetha as Aparna, Atheena
- Thilakan as Kesava Kurup
- Srividya as Aparna's Mother
- Master Amit
- Innocent
- Mala Aravindan as Bose
- Sukumari
- Tony as Singer
- Lizy as Herself
- Ranjini Haridas as child at school (uncredited)

== Plot ==
Besides having numerous business ventures in which she is a partner, Aparna (Geetha) joins as a teacher in a non-profitable organisation against her mother's wishes. A kid named Abhimanyu in her class grabs her attention. Later, she finds that Abhimanyu's father is a famous playwright, Yatheendran, alias Yathi (Mammootty), a man whom she once loved. Yathi's latest play titled "Aparna" was inspired by her life. Aparna treated Abhimanyu with the utmost care until a mysterious man named Jagadeesh Nair (Mohanlal), claiming to be the biological father of Abhimanyu, landed from the US to take the child with him. Aparna learns that Abhimanyu was none other than the son of her late twin sister Atheena (Geetha) who was married to Jagadeesh.

Jagadeesh pressurises Yathi to get him to hand over Abhimanyu back to Jagadeesh. After trying to resist and reason with Jagadeesh, Yathi finally allows Jagadeesh to take Abhimanyu with him. After spending a night with the child Jagadeesh realises that he cannot replace Yathi's love and care for the child. Jagadeesh gives back Abhimanyu to Yathi and Aparna, before flying back to America.

== Soundtrack ==
- "Aromal Hamsame" (K. J. Yesudas, Bichu Thirumala, Ravindran)
- "Chuvaduvachu Kalikkane" (Sujatha Mohan, Bichu Thirumala, Ravindran)
- "Hei Kurumpi" (K. S. Chithra, Bichu Thirumala, Ravindran)
