= List of Malayalam films of 1997 =

The following is a list of Malayalam films released in the year 1997.

Opening		Film	Cast	Director	Music director	Notes
J A N						
J A N	17	Mannadiar Penninu Chenkotta Checkan	Mukesh, Kanaka	Babu Narayanan	Raveendran	
J A N	18	Itha Oru Snehagatha	Vikram, Laila, Captain Raju	Captain Raju	Deva	
J A N	23	Arjunan Pillayum Anchu Makkalum	Jagadheesh, Jagathy Sreekumar, Innocent, Charmila	Chandrasekharan	Mohan Sithara	
J A N	F E B	3	The Car	Jayaram, Janardhanan, Sreelakshmi	Rajasenan	Sanjeev
6	F E B	Kulam	Suresh Gopi, Bhanupriya	Lenin Rajendran	MG Radhakrishnan	
24	F E B	Five Star Hospital	George Vishnu, Jagadish, Thilakan			
25	F E B	Ullasapoongattu	Dileep, Mohini	Vinayan	Berny-Ignatius	
A P R	4	Varnapakittu	Mohanlal, Meena	I. V. Sasi	Vidyasagar	
A P R	9	Bhoopathi	Suresh Gopi, Kanaka, Priyaraman	Joshiy	S. P. Venkatesh	
A P R	15	Manthra Mothiram	Dileep, Nedumudi Venu	Sasi Shanker	Johnson	
A P R	18	Bhoothakannadi	Mammootty, Sreelakshmi	Lohithadas	Johnson	
M A Y	1	Kaliyoonjal	Mammootty, Shobana, Dileep, Shalini	Anil Babu	Ilaiyaraaja	
M A Y	10	Gajaraja Manthram	Jagadhish, Prem Kumar, Charmila	Thaha	Berny-Ignatius	
M A Y	17	Gangothri	Suresh Gopi, Roja, Thilakan	S. Anil	S. P. Venkatesh	
M A Y	18	Irattakuttikalude Achan	Jayaram, Manju Warrier	Sathyan Anthikad	Johnson	
M A Y	19	Katha Nayakan	Jayaram, Kalamandalam Kesavan, Divya Unni	Rajasenan	Mohan Sithara	
M A Y	21	Lelam	Suresh Gopi, M. G. Soman, Nandhini	Joshiy	S. P. Venkatesh	
J U N	7	Mayaponman	Dileep, Kalabhavan Mani, Mohini	Thulasidas	Berny-Ignatius	
J U N	9	Kilukil Pambaram	Jayaram, Vani Viswanath, Jagathy Sreekumar	Thulasidas	S. P. Venkatesh	
J U L	8	Hitler Brothers	Prem Kumar. Jagathy Sreekumar	Sandhya Mohan	S. P. Venkatesh	
J U L	18	Karunyam	Jayaram, Murali, Divya Unni	A.K Lohithadas	Kaithapuram Damodaran Namboothiri	
J U L	25	Kalyanappittannu	Mukesh, Dileep, Priya Raman	K. K. Haridas	Ravindran	
A U G	22	Kaliyattam	Suresh Gopi, Manju Warrier, Lal, Biju Menon	Jayaraaj	Kaithapram	
S E P	1	Oral Mathram	Mammootty, Thilakan, Shruti	Sathyan Anthikkad	Johnson	
S E P	4	Chandralekha	Mohanlal, Pooja Batra, Sukanya	Priyadarshan	Berny Ignatius	
S E P	9	Churam	Manoj K. Jayan, Divya Unni	Bharathan	Johnson	
S E P	13	Oru Yathramozhi	Mohanlal, Sivaji Ganeshan, Ranjitha	Prathap Pothan	Ilaiyaraaja	
S E P	17	Janathipathyam	Suresh Gopi, Urvashi, Vani Vishwanath	K. Madhu		
O C T	1	Junior Mandrake	Jagadish, Jagathy Sreekumar, Rajan P Dev	Ali Akbar	Berny Ignatius	
O C T	14	Superman	Jayaram, Shobana	Rafi and Mecartin	S. P. Venkatesh	
O C T	15	Adukkala Rahasyam Angaadi Paattu	Vijayaraghavan, Geetha	Nissar		
O C T	19	Guru	Mohanlal, Sithara, Suresh Gopi	Rajiv Anchal	Ilaiyaraaja	
D E C	20	Anubhoothi	Suresh Gopi, Khushbu, Vani Vishwanath	I. V. Sasi	Shyam	
D E C	24	Kalyana Kacheri	Mukesh, Shobhana, Jagathi Sreekumar	Anil Chandra	S. P. Venkatesh	
D E C	25	Poonilamazha	Sanjay Mitra, Ankitha	Sunil	Laxmikant–Pyarelal	
		Krishnagudiyil Oru Pranayakalathu	Jayaram, Manju Warrier, Biju Menon	Kamal	Vidyasagar	
		Kudamattam	Dileep, Manju Warrier, Vijayaraghavan, Biju Menon, Mohini	Sundar Das	Johnson	
		Ancharakalyanam	Jagadish, Janardanan, Kalabhavan Mani	VM Vinu		
		Innalekalillaathe	Biju Menon, Manju Warrier	George Kithu		
		Guru Sishyan	Jagadish, Kalabhavan Mani, Kaveri	Sasi Shankar	Johnson	
		Kottappurathe Koottukudumbam	Vijayaraghavan, Urvasi, Janardanan			
		Nee Varuvolam	Dileep, Divya Unni, Thilakan	Sibi Malayil	Johnson	
		Asuravamsam	Manoj K. Jayan, Biju Menon, Priya Raman	Shaji Kailas		
		Poothumbiyum Poovalanmarum	Vani Vishwanath, Prem Kumar			
		Nagarapuraanam	Jagadish, Thilakan			
		Mangalya Pallakku	Sreenivasan, Jagadish, Kasthuri			
		Moonu Kodiyum Munnooru Pavanum	Jagadish, Shammi Thilakan			
		Kannur	Manoj K Jayan, Vani Vishwanath	Haridas	Raveendran	
		Newspaper Boy	Mukesh, Suma Kanakala	Nissar		
		Adivaram	Vijayaraghavan, Murali	Jose Thomas	Johnson	
		Kalyana Unnikal	Baiju, Mahesh	Jagathy Sreekumar		
		Siamese Irattakal	Sainudeen, Maniyanpilla Raju			
		Masmaram	Suresh Gopi, Arpana Rao	Thampi Kannamthanam	S. P. Venkatesh	
		Mangamma	Revathi, Nedumudi Venu, Vijayaraghavan	T. V. Chandran	Johnson	
		Suvarna Simhaasanam	Suresh Gopi, Mukesh, Ranjitha	P. G. Viswambharan	Ouseppachan	
		Manasam	Dileep, Srividya, Kaveri, Biju Menon			
		Vamsam	Mukesh, Sukumaran, Sreejaya Nair	Baiju Kottarakkara		
		Rishyasringan	Bhanupriya, Krishna	Suresh Unnithan		
		Ikkareyanente Manasam	Prem Kumar, Mohini			
		Fashion Parade				
		Niyogam				
		Shibiram				
		Manikya Koodaram				
		Snehadooth				
		Oru Mutham Manimutham				
		Sankeerthanam Pole				
		The Good Boys				
		The Ranger				
		Aattuvela				
		Snehasindooram				
		Kaduva Thoma				
		Vaachalam				
		Janmadinam				
		Sammanam	Manoj K JayanManju Warrier	Sundar Das		
		Moksham				

== Dubbed films ==
Title	Director	Music	Cast
Yuvashakthi	Joe Simon	Sathu Kokila	Babu Antony
