= Anil (director) =

Indian film maker (born 1963)

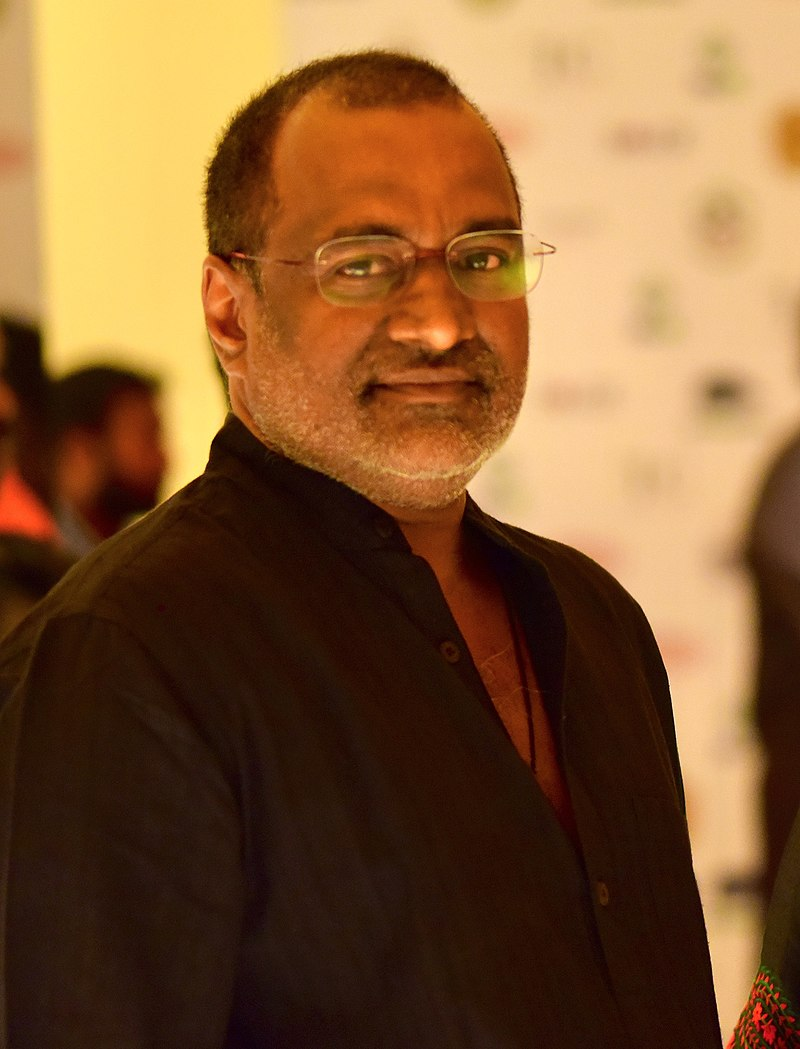
- Born: Anil Kumar; 3 May 1963 (age 63); Alappuzha, Kerala, India
- Occupation: Film director
- Years active: 1989 – present
- Spouse: Kalpana (m. 1998; div. 2012)
- Children: 1
- Parents: Purushothaman Nair; Lakshmikutty Amma
- Website: www.anilfilmdirector.com

Anil (born 3 May 1963) is an Indian film maker who works in Malayalam Cinema. He has been active in the Malayalam film industry from 1989. He directed 31 films in Malayalam language, together with Babu Narayanan under the name Anil–Babu.

== Personal life ==
Anil married national award-winning actress Kalpana in 1998 and later divorced in 2012. Their only daughter Sreemayi lived with Kalpana, until Kalpana's death on 25 January 2016.

== Filmography ==
=== As a solo director ===
Year	Film	Notes
1989	Anantha Vruthantham	
1991	Post Box No. 27	
2005	Lokanathan IAS	
2007	Kalabham	
2007	Anchil Oral Arjunan	
2008	Parthan Kanda Paralokam	
2012	Manthrikan	
2012	Hide N' Seek	
2013	Climax	
2015	Serndhu Polama	Tamil film
2017	Maiya	

=== Anil-Babu ===
Year	Film
1992	Ponnaramthottathe Rajavu
1992	Mantrikacheppu
1992	Welcome to Kodaikanal
1993	Injakkadan Mathai & Sons
1993	Sakshal Sreeman Chathunni
1994	Sthreedhanam
1994	Kudumba Vishesham
1995	Achan Kombathu Amma Varampathu
1995	Radholsavam
1995	Street
1996	Harbour
1996	Aramana Veedum Anjoorekkarum
1997	Mannadiar Penninu Chenkotta Checkan
1997	Kaliyoonjal
1998	Mayilpeelikkavu
1999	Pattabhishekam
2000	Ingane Oru Nilapakshi
2001	Uthaman
2002	Pakalppooram
2003	Njan Salperu Ramankutty
2003	Valkannadi
2004	Kusruthi
2004	Parayam
