= Babu Narayanan =

Indian film director (1959–2019)

- Born: 1959; Kozhikode, Kerala, India
- Died: 29 June 2019 (aged 60)
- Occupation: Film director
- Years active: 1989 – 2019
- Spouse: Jyothi Babu
- Children: 2
- Parents: Narayana Pisharody; Devaki Pisharasyar

Babu Narayanan (1959 – 29 June 2019) was an Indian film director who worked in Malayalam film industry. He directed more than 25 Malayalam movies. He was a popular Malayalam movie director during the 1990s. Together with P. Anil, he directed popular movies like Manthrikacheppu, Sthreedhanam, Kudumba Vishesham, Aramana Veedum Anjoorekkarum, Kaliyoonjal and Pattabhishekam. Last movie they did together was Parayam in 2004. Later he took a break from movies. He made a comeback in 2013 with the Malayalam movie To Noora with Love. He was Associate Director of Director Hariharan and Co director of Keralavarama Pazhassiraja.

== Personal life ==
Babu was born to Narayana Pisharody and Devaki Pisharasiar at Kozhikode. He was married to Jyothi. The couple had two children.

== Death ==
Babu Narayanan died on 29 June 2019 at the age of 60. He was a cancer patient.

== Filmography ==
=== As a solo director ===
Year	Film
1989	Anagha
1990	Ponnaranjaanam
2013	To Noora with Love

=== Anil-Babu ===
Year	Film
1992	Ponnaramthottathe Raajaavu
1992	Manthrikacheppu
1992	Welcome to Kodaikanal
1993	Injakkadan Mathai & Sons
1993	Sakshal Sreeman Chathunni
1994	Sthreedhanam
1994	Kudumba Vishesham
1995	Achan Kombathu Amma Varampathu
1995	Radholsavam
1995	Street
1996	Harbour
1996	Aramana Veedum Anjoorekkarum
1997	Mannadiar Penninu Chenkotta Checkan
1997	Kaliyoonjal
1998	Mayilpeelikkavu
1999	Pattabhishekam
2000	Ingane Oru Nilapakshi
2001	Uthaman
2001	Kumarasambhavam
2002	Pakalppooram
2002	Valkannadi
2003	Njan Salperu Ramankutty
2004	Kusruthi
2004	Parayam

=== Writer ===
- Ponnaranjanam (1990) (dialogue)
- Om Gurubhyo Nama (2002) (story)
