= Anil–Babu =

Indian filmmaking duo

- Occupation: Film directors
- Years active: 1992–2004

Anil and Babu were a director duo. Anil and Babu both individually directed two films before they directed several films together from 1992 to 2004. They worked together for most of their career. While Anil directed nine films after 2004 Babu only directed one. Babu died in 2019.

== Filmography ==
Year	Film
1992	Ponnaramthottathe Rajavu
1992	Mantrikacheppu
1992	Welcome to Kodaikanal
1993	Injakkadan Mathai & Sons
1993	Sakshal Sreeman Chathunni
1994	Sthreedhanam
1994	Kudumba Vishesham
1995	Achan Kombathu Amma Varampathu
1995	Radholsavam
1995	Street
1996	Harbour
1996	Aramana Veedum Anjoorekkarum
1997	Mannadiar Penninu Chenkotta Checkan
1997	Kaliyoonjal
1998	Mayilpeelikkavu
1999	Pattabhishekam
2000	Ingane Oru Nilapakshi
2001	Uthaman
2002	Pakalppooram
2003	Njan Salperu Ramankutty
2003	Valkannadi
2004	Kusruthi
2004	Parayam
