= Meena Ganesh =

Indian film actress (1942–2024)

- Born: 15 July 1942; Palakkad, Madras Province, British India
- Died: 19 December 2024 (aged 82); Shoranur, Palakkad district, Kerala, India
- Occupation: Actress

Meena Ganesh (15 July 1942 – 19 December 2024) was an Indian theatre artist and actress who acted mostly in Malayalam film. As a theatre artist, she has won many awards, including the Guru Pooja Award from the Kerala Sangeetha Nataka Academy.

== Biography ==
Born in Kallekulangara, Palakkad, in 1942, Meena is the second of three daughters of Pallath Lakshmi Amma and Pullanikattu Kesavan Nair, who was a Tamil actor. Later she moved to Chuduvalathur, Shoranur, Maithrinagar.

Meena died from a stroke in Shoranur, Palakkad district, Kerala, on 19 December 2024, at the age of 82.

=== Personal life ===
Her husband was the late A.N. Ganesh, a playwright, actor and director. Her acquaintance with the theater industry led to her marriage to Ganesh. They had two children, including television serial director Manoj.

== Career ==
Meena Ganesh entered the acting field at the age of nineteen through theatre. In the theatre field, she had worked in plays of various theatre companies in Kerala including SL Puram Surya Soma, Kayamkulam Kerala Theatres, and Thrissur Chinmayi. Meena had appeared on stage in over three hundred different roles in different professional and amateur plays and had also acted in around two hundred films and 25 television serials. She also given voice for many radio dramas broadcast by All India Radio's Kozhikode and Thrissur stations.

Meena Ganesh made her film debut with a small role in the 1976 film Manimuzhakam. She became active in the Malayalam film industry after she played the role of Pathumma in the 1991 film Mukhachitram.

Meena Ganesh, who moved to Shoranur after her marriage, had started a drama society in Shoranur called Pournami Kalamandir.

== Filmography ==
=== Malayalam ===
Year	Film	Role
1976	Manimuzhakkam	
1983	Mandanmmar Londanil	
1983	Prasnam Gurutharam	Astrologer
1986	Bhagavan	
1986	Nakhakshathangal	
1991	Mukha Chithram	Seller
1992	Thalayanamanthram	
1992	Utsavamelam	
1992	Valayam	Ravi's mother
1992	Ponnaramthoottathe Raajaavu	Maluvamma
1992	Snehasagaram	Kunjammuma
1992	Mukha Chithram	Pathumma
1993	Golantharavartha	Sharadha
1993	Bhoomigeetham	Student's mother
1993	Saakshaal Sreemaan Chaathunni	
1993	Venkalam	
1993	Manichithrathazhu	
1993	Pidakkozhi Koovunna Noottandu	
1994	Pingami	Kuttyhasan's mother
1994	Santhanagopalam	Adiyodi's wife
1995	Achan Kombathu Amma Varampathu	Maya's mother
1995	Avittam Thirunaal Aarogya Sriman	
1995	Kakkakum Poochakkum Kalyanam	
1995	Sindoora Rekha	
1996	Harbour	Kaalithalla
1996	Kudumbakodathi	Guntur Parvathy's mother
1996	Kazhakam	
1996	Ee Puzhayum Kadannu	Devaki
1996	Udhyanapalakan	
1996	Kanakkinavu	
1996	Kalyana Sougandhikam	Murukeshan's wife
1997	Kaliyoonjal	Vellachi
1997	Asuravamsam	
1997	Manasam	
1997	Siamese Irattakal	Preman - Dasan's mother
1997	Ikkareyanente Manasam	
1997	Rishyasringan	
1997	Kudamttam	
1997	Shobhanam	Siddique's umma
1998	Panchaloham	
1998	Sreekrishnapurathe Nakshathrathilakkam	Kausalya's mother
1998	Meenathil Thalikettu	Janu
1998	Rakthasakshikal Sindabad	Kuttathi's mother
1998	Daya	
1998	Thirakalkkappuram	Pottiyamma
1998	Manjukalavum Kazhinju	
1999	Vasanthiyum Lakshmiyum Pinne Njaanum	Ramu's mother
1999	My Dear Karadi	Manikuttan's mother
1999	Sparsham	Bhargaviyamma
2000	Valliettan	Chathunni's wife
2000	Shayanam	
2000	Dada Sahib	
2000	Aanamuttathe Aangalamar	
2000	Kannadikadavathu	Katha
2000	Punaradhivasam	
2001	Bhadra	Jayadevan's grandmother
2001	Mazhamegha Pravukal	Bhairavi
2001	Chithrathoonukal	
2001	Aaram Jaalakam	
2001	Vezhambal	
2001	House Owner	
2001	Ee Nadu Innale Vare	Nabeesumma
2001	Karumadikuttan	Maathu Ettathi
2002	Meesa Madhavan	Village lady/Umma
2002	Nandanam	Karthyayani Amma
2002	Uthara	
2002	Valkannadi	Padmini
2003	Mizhi Randilum	
2003	War and Love	Basheer's mother
2003	Sadanandante Samayam	Naniyamma
2003	Kaliyodam	
2003	CI Mahadevan 5 Adi 4 Inchu	Mahadevan's mother
2003	Ammakkilikoodu	Inmate
2004	Freedom	Umma
2005	OK Chacko Cochin Mumbai	Karthayani
2005	Hai	
2005	Naran	Umma
2005	Nomparam	
2005	Manikyan	Manikyan's mother
2005	Chandrolsavam	Madhavi
2006	Jayam	
2007	Sooryakireedam	
2008	Mulla	Pilgrim
2008	Thavalam	Nabeesumma
2008	Mohitham	
2009	Samastha Keralam PO	Narayani
2009	Black Dhaliya	Servant
2009	Swantham Bharya Zindabadh	
2009	Ividam Swargamanu	Tea Shopper
2009	Sanmanassullavan Appukuttan	Gopalan's mother
2010	Nandhuni	Naniyamma
2011	Manushyamrugam	Vasu's mother
2012	Orange	Saritha's step mother
2012	Doctor Innocent Aanu	
2012	Ezham Suryan	
2012	Nuzrat	
2013	Celluloid	Actress
2014	Onnum Mindathe	Jose's mother
2015	Ithinumappuram	Thanka
2015	Mariyam Mukku	Mariyamma
2015	The Reporter	Tea Stall owner
2015	Saigal Padukayanu	
2015	Nee-Na	Thresiakutty
2015	Kotharan Oru Malayala Cinema	
2016	Pathirakkattu	

== TV serials ==
- Geethanjali
- Devaragam
- Snehatheeram
- Velankani Mathavu
- Ramayanam
- Calcutta Hospital
- Ettu Sundarikalum Njanum
- Mangalyam
- AL THWALAQ
- Kalyanaveeran
- Karunyam
- Vayalkilikal
- Sthree
- Minnukettu
- Aa Amma

== Television shows ==
- Sreekandan Nair Show

== Awards and honors ==
She has won many awards, including the Guru Pooja Award from the Kerala Sangeetha Nataka Academy.
