= Usha (actress) =

Indian Malayalam film actress

- Born: Haseena Haneef; Alappuzha, Kerala, India
- Occupations: Actor; Singer; Anchor
- Years active: 1984 (child artist); 1988–present
- Spouse: Nazar Abdul Khader (m. 2011)
- Parents: Muhammed Haneef; Hafsa Beevi

Haseena Haneef, better known by her stage name Usha, is an Indian actress, singer and anchor, who has worked predominantly in Malayalam film industry. She has acted in more than 70 movies. Usha made her acting debut as a child artist in the 1984 film Nokkethadhoorathu Kannum Nattu.

== Personal life ==
She was born as Haseena to Muhammed Haneef, an assistant sub-inspector in Kerala Police and Hafsa Beevi, at Alisherry, Alappuzha district, Kerala. She has two brothers; Haseeb and Hanees, both of whom are in the film industry. She had her primary education from Government Mohammedan's Higher Secondary School, Alappuzha. She was a theatre artist before becoming a cine artist. She debuted as a heroine to Balachandra Menon in the movie Kandathum Kettathum in 1988. Later in 2011, she married Nazar Abdul Khader, a Chennai-based businessman.

== Partial filmography ==
- Nokkethadhoorathu Kannum Nattu (1984) as Child Artist in Song "Lathiri Poothiri Punchiri Cheppo" 14 age
- Kandathum Kettathum (1988) as Muthu Lekshmi
- Aattinakkare (1989) as Sindhu
- Annakutty Kodambakkam Vilikkunnu (1989) as Ponnammma
- Carnival (1989) as Vanaja
- Kireedam (1989) as Latha
- Varnnam (1989) as Ammu's friend
- Vadakkunokkiyantram (1989) as Thankamani
- Eenam Maranna Kattu (1989)
- Ammayude Swantham Kunju Mary (1990) as Jessy
- Ponnaranjaanam (1990) as Savithri, Ponnu
- Thoovalsparsham (1990) as Indu
- Kottayam Kunjachan (1990) as Susie
- Arhatha (1990) as Sindhu
- Anantha Vruthantham (1990) as Vijayalakshmi
- Pavam Pavam Rajakumaran (1990) as Uma
- Apoorvam Chilar (1991) as Hema
- Koodikazhcha (1991) as Annie
- Ulsavamelam (1992) as Ashwathy
- Aadhaaram (1992) as Shahida
- Mithunam (1993) as Shyama
- Sthreedhanam (1993) as Vanaja
- Chenkol (1993) as Latha
- Thalamura (1993) as Malu
- Naalai Engal Kalyanam (1993) - Tamil film as Shembakam
- Vardhakya Puranam (1994) as Mollykutty
- Kudumba Vishesham (1994) as Vidya
- Bheesmacharya (1994) as Sathi
- Malappuram Haji Mahanaya Joji (1994) as Premalatha
- Vadhu Doctoranu (1994) as Nirmala
- Kadal (1994) as Ammini
- Chaithanyam (1995)
- Thovalapookkal (1995) as Shobha
- Avittam Thirunaal Aarogya Sriman (1995) as Jalaja
- Street (1995) as Kanakam
- Guru Shishyan (1997) as Sumathi
- Ancharakalyanam (1997) as Susheela
- Vamsam (1997) as Alice
- Ikkareyanente Manasam (1997) as Malathi
- Adukkala Rahasyam Angaadi Paattu (1997) as Janna
- Varnapakittu (1997) as Tonichen's wife
- Ullasapoongattu (1997) as Maya's sister
- Draavidan (1998) as Treesa
- Oro Viliyum Kathorthu (1998) as Snehalatha
- Mayajalam (1998) as Servant
- Panchaloham (1998) as Sulochana
- Captain (1999) as Kasthuri
- Ennum Sambhavami Yuge Yuge (2001) as Shantha
- Akhila (2002) as Bindhu
- Nakshathrakkannulla Rajakumaran Avanundoru Rajakumari (2002) as Cheeru
- Www.anukudumbam.com (2002) as Susheela Duttan
- Guda (2003)
- Nomparam (2005) as Devu
- Achanurangatha Veedu (2006) as Lillykutty
- Vaasthavam (2006) as Shubha
- Avan Chandiyude Makan (2007) as Kochurani
- Athisayan (2007) as Koshy's wife
- Bullet (2008) as Maheswari
- Chempada (2008) as Gomathi
- Twenty:20 (2008) as Latha
- Decent Parties (2009)
- Cheriya Kallanum Valiya Policum (2010) as Padmini
- Advocate Lakshmanan - Ladies Only (2010) as Pankajavally
- Njaan Sanchaari (2010) as Ashokan's wife
- Ajantha (2012)
- Ithu Manthramo Thanthramo Kuthanthramo (2013)
- Pigman (2013) as Sreekumar's sister
- God's Own Country (2014) as Muhammed's wife
- Oru Manjukalathinte Ormakkai (2014) as Anitta
- Sivapuram (2016)
- Karutha Joothan (2017)
- Achayans (2017) as Jessica's mother
- Aakashamittayee (2017) as Palani's wife
- Lolans (2018) as Leona's mother
- My Great Grandfather (2019) as Cameo
- Azhakode Alappuzha (2022) - Short film
- Badarul Muneer Husnul Jamal (2015) as Umakulsu
- Jannath
- Mittayi Theruvu
- Adiyanthravasthakalathe Pranayam (2022)
- Cheena Trophy (2023) as Usha
- Kondal (2024)

== Television serials ==
- Adutha Bellodu Koodi Nadakam Aarambhikkum
- Arabikadalinte Rani
- Padavukal
- Devamanohari Nee
- Kaathirunna Kannukal
- Kooman Kolli
- Katha Parayunna Kannukal
- Tharavum Ponmuttaym (DD Malayalam)
- 1999 - Krishnathulasi
- 2002 - Vasundhara Medicals (Asianet)
- 2005 - Alilathali (Surya TV)
- 2006- Sthreethwam Surya TV
- 2007- Nandhanam- Surya TV
- 2010 - Indraneelam (Surya TV) as vaikashika Subramaniam a.k.a. Akka
- 2013 - Nilapakshi (Kairali TV)
- 2016 - Jagratha (Amrita TV)
- 2018 - Bhagyajathakam (Mazhavil Manorama)
- 2023- kumkumacheppu ( flowers tv) as padmavati

== Other information ==
Besides acting in films she has acted in some television serials including Nilapakshi, a telefilm called Nanmayude Nakshathrangal, and in reality shows Tharotsavam and Nakshathradeepangal on Kairali TV. She also appeared in TV Shows like Comedy Super Nite, Katha Ithuvare etc. She has acted in devotional albums like Devipooja. She has sung and featured in music videos like Punyangalude Pookkalam, Ee Kalavum Kadannu Pokum etc. She has also anchored a program called Business Talks for Kerala Vision.
