= Bindu Panicker =

Indian actress

- Born: Kozhikode, Kerala
- Occupation: Actress
- Years active: 1992 – present
- Spouse: Biju V Nair (m. 1997; death 2003) Sai Kumar (m. 2009)
- Children: Kalyani Panicker

Bindu Panicker is an Indian actress who has more than 200 films to her credit. Having played both comedy and character roles in Malayalam cinema, she was critically acclaimed for her performance in Soothradharan (2001). She has been a member of the Association of Malayalam Movie Artists executive committee.

== Personal life ==
She was married to Biju. V. Nair, a businessman, in 1997. He died of a heart attack in 2003. Their daughter, Kalyani Panicker, debuted as an actress in the film Madhuvidhu.

In 2009, she married actor Sai Kumar.

== Awards and nominations ==
Award	Year	Category	Film	Result
Asianet Film Awards	2001	Second Best Actress	Soothradharan	Won
Asianet Film Awards	2001	Best Supporting Actress	Narendra Makan Jayakanthan Vaka	Won
Vanitha Film Awards	2014	Best Supporting Actress	Pullipulikalum Aattinkuttiyum	Won
Filmfare Awards South	2014	Best Supporting Actress	Pullipulikalum Aattinkuttiyum	Nominated
South Indian International Movie Awards	2014	Best Actress in a Supporting Role- Malayalam	Pullipulikalum Aattinkuttiyum	Nominated
South Indian International Movie Awards	2023	Best Actress in a Supporting Role- Malayalam	Rorshack	Won

== Filmography ==
Year	Title	Role	Notes
1992	Kamaladalam	Madhavanunni's wife	
1992	Valayam	Vanaja	
1993	Kalippattam	Venu's sister	
1993	Sopanam	Manoharan's wife	
1993	Oru Kadankatha Pole	Sarala	
1993	Kabooliwala	Kanakamma	
1993	Samooham	Gopika	
1993	Vatsalyam	Nalini	
1993	Injakkadan Mathai & Sons		
1993	Aakashadooth	Marikungu	
1994	Nandini Oppol	Indu	
1994	The City	Sumathi	
1994	Sagaram Sakshi	Malathy	
1994	Sammohanam	Jaanu	
1994	Puthran	Susanna	
1994	Parinayam	Cheriya Athemaru	
1995	The King	Mrs. Jayakrishnan	
1995	Achan Kombathu Amma Varampathu	Shyamala	
1995	Special Squad	Sabiya	
1995	Ormakalundayirikkanam	Mariyamma	
1995	Mangalam Veettil Manaseswari Gupta	Vasumathi	
1995	Oru Abhibhashakante Case Diary	Sindhu	
1995	Thovalapookkal	Gomathy Susheelan	
1995	Saadaram	Rama	
1996	Adukkala Rahasyam Angaadi Paattu		
1996	Sallapam	Padmini	
1996	Naalaam Kettile Nalla Thambimaar	Sainu	
1996	Harbour	Karthyayani	
1996	Aakaashathekkoru Kilivaathil	Geetha	
1996	Ishtamanu Nooruvattom	Kamalam	
1996	Thooval Kottaram	Rama	
1996	April 19	Jayan's mother	
1996	Ee Puzhayum Kadannu	Malathy	
1997	Oru Sankeerthanam Pole	Mathayachan's wife	
1997	Sibiram	Alice	
1997	Poonilamazha	Bharathi	
1997	Mannadiar Penninu Chenkotta Checkan	Thilothama	
1997	The Car	Usha	
1997	The Good Boys	Rajeswari	
1997	Superman	Swarnalatha	
1997	Ishtadanam	Uma	
1997	Arjunan Pillayum Anchu Makkalum	Jayalakshmi	
1997	Katha Nayakan	Meenakshi	
1997	Kaliyattam	Cheeramma	The Story Based on Shakespeare's Othello
1997	Asuravamsam	Vijayalakshmi	
1997	Sammanam	Devi's mother	
1997	Love Today	Krishnaveni	Tamil film
1998	Kusruthi Kuruppu	Noorjahan	
1998	Malabaril Ninnoru Mani Maran	Vasundhara	
1998	Sreekrishnapurathe Nakshathrathilakkam	Indu	
1998	Mayilpeelikkavu	Yashodhara Devi	
1998	Vismayam	Chinnakurup's wife	
1998	Unnudan	Gowri's mother	Tamil film
1999	Swarnanilavu		
1999	Pranaya Nilavu		
1999	Charlie Chaplin		
1999	Njangal Santhushtaranu	Saudamini	
1999	Niram	Maya	
1999	Vanaprastham	Bhageerathi	National Award Winning Film(1999)
1999	Tokyo Nagarathile Viseshangal	Chandramathi	
2000	The Warrant		
2000	Arayannangalude Veedu	Sunanda	
2000	Joker	Susheela	
2000	Sahayathrikakku Snehapoorvam	Girija	
2000	Anamuttathe Angalamar	Sujatha	
2000	Swayamvara Panthal	Vasanthy Vijayan	
2000	Snehapoorvam Anna	Fousi Aunty	
2000	Mark Antony	Nimmy's mother	
2000	Varnakkazhchakal	Saumini	
2001	Chethaaram		
2001	Mazhameghapravukal	Mrs. Anandan	
2001	Aandolanam	Janaky	
2001	Sharja To Sharja	Sethu's wife	
2001	Narendran Makan Jayakanthan Vaka	Saudamini	Winner:-Asianet Film Award For Best Supporting Actress
2001	Nariman	M.L.A	
2001	Naranathu Thampuran	Prabha	
2001	Dhosth	Kuttappan's wife	
2001	Bharthavudyogam	Mohini	
2001	Soothradharan	Devumma	Winner:-Kerala State Film Award For Best Supporting Actress
2002	Shambho Mahadeva		
2002	Sundari		
2002	Krishna Pakshakkilikal	Sandhya	
2002	Oomappenninu Uriyadappayyan	Thresiamma	
2002	Phantom	Mariya	
2002	Bamboo Boys	Hridayakumari	
2002	Samurai	Deiva's mother	Tamil film
2002	Kunjikoonan	Umma	
2002	Desam	Nalini	
2002	Kanalkireedam	Rose	
2002	Chathurangam	Annie	
2003	Kalari Vikraman		Unreleased
2003	Mr. Brahmachari	Nirmala	
2003	Vasanthamalika	Aanandavalli	
2003	Thilakkam	Vanaja	
2003	Gramaphone	Sachidhanathan's mother	
2003	Swapnam Kondu Thulabharam	Hostel Matrom	
2003	Vellithira	Bhavani	
2003	Sadanandante Samayam	Sadanandan's sister	
2003	C.I.D. Moosa	Ramani	
2003	Pattalam	Sulochana	
2003	Pattanathil Sundaran	Radhamani's mother	
2004	Jana	Jana's sister	Tamil film
2004	Sasneham Sumithra	Meenakshi	
2004	Kanninum Kannadikkum	Soudamini	
2004	Vellinakshatram	Bhagyalakshmi	
2004	Chathikkatha Chanthu	Renuka	Cameo
2004	Mayilattam	Bindu	
2004	Agninakshathram	Sathi	
2004	Vettam	K.T. Mathews's wife	
2004	Natturajavu	Thankamma	
2004	Bunglavil Outha	Thresia	
2004	Kadhavasheshan	Gopi's sister	
2005	Immini Nalloral	Vishalam	
2005	Iruvattam Manavaatti	Chandramathi	
2005	Ponmudipuzhayorathu	Bharathi	
2005	Athbhutha Dweepu	Anasooya	
2005	Maanikyan	Gauri	
2005	Udayon	Ichamma	
2005	Naran	Narayani Amma	
2005	Nerariyan CBI	Elizabeth	
2005	Boyfriend	Mary Pius	
2005	Arputha Theevu	Anasooya	Tamil film
2005	Bus Conductor	Kunjakka's mother	
2006	Arunam		
2006	Drishtantham		
2006	Mukhamariyaathe	Savithri	
2006	Kilukkam Kilukilukkam	Nun	
2006	Lion	Devaki	
2006	Rasathanthram	Sobhana	
2006	Aanachandam	Krishnaprasad's sister	
2006	Pathaaka	Mollykutty	
2006	Baba Kalyani	Mayor	Cameo
2007	Janmam		
2007	Kichamani MBA	Thresia	
2007	Khaki	Bhanumathi	
2007	Aakasham	Bharathi	
2007	Rakshakan	Dr. Arundati Narendran	
2007	Speed Track	M. Treesa	
2007	Mayavi	Thottapulli's Surendra's wife	
2007	Subhadram	Subhadra's Mother	
2007	Nadiya Kollappetta Rathri	Rajamma	
2007	Eakantham	Chandrika	
2007	Chocolate	Mariya	
2007	Nasrani	M. C. Paul's wife	
2007	Kangaroo	Annakutty	
2008	Thavalam		
2008	Novel	Sethunath's sister	
2008	Calcutta News	Leela	
2008	Roudram	Sainaba	
2008	Positive	Raju's mother	
2008	Kerala Police	Sathyan's mother	
2008	Jubilee	Jancy	
2008	Sound of Boot	Mathaji	
2008	Twenty 20	Geetha	
2009	Chattambinadu		
2009	Meghatheertham		
2009	Kerala Cafe	JK's wife	Segment:"Happy Journey"; Voice only
2009	Makante Achan	Sandanavalli	
2009	Patham Adhyayam	Dileep's mother	
2009	Pramukhan	Kannan's mother	
2009	Kappal Muthalaali	Suseela	
2009	Ee Pattanathil Bhootham	Soozi	
2009	Sanmanasullavan Appukuttan	Santha	
2009	Seetha Kalyanam	Madurammal	
2010	Senior Mandrake		
2010	Pulliman		
2010	Thanthonni	Kochukunju's aunt	
2010	Pokkiri Raja	Rukmini	
2010	Thoovalkattu	Hajiyar's Wife	
2010	Fiddle	Sugandhi	
2010	Nallavan	Murukan's mother	
2010	Aatmakatha	Saramma	
2010	Androru Naal	Subhadra's mother	Tamil film
2011	Nadakame Ulakam	Milma Girija	
2011	101 Ruppika	Nandhini's mother	
2011	Aazhakadal	Thressiamma	
2011	Living Together	Vasanthi	
2011	Manikyakkallu	Rakhi	
2011	Teja Bhai & Family	Lathika	
2011	Dr. Love	Ajithakumari	
2011	Sevenes	Shyam's mother	
2011	Innanu Aa Kalyanam	Suseela	
2011	Kanakazchakal		
2012	Yadhartyam		
2012	Orkut Oru Ormakoot		
2012	Kunjaliyan	Syamala	
2012	Manjadikuru	Ammu Valliamma	
2013	Meow Meow Karimboocha		
2013	Aattakatha		
2013	Players (film)	Aji's mother	
2013	Kadal Kadannu Oru Maathukutty	Herself	Cameo
2013	Pullipulikalum Aattinkuttiyum	Kainakri Revamma	
2014	Parayan Baaki Vechathu	Susheela Panicker	
2014	My Dear Mummy	Prof. Rosakutty	
2015	Ammakkoru Tharattu	Rathi	
2015	Mili	Ramani	
2015	Open Your Mind	Rahul's mother	Short film
2015	Amar Akbar Anthony	Akbar's mother	
2016	Oru Murai Vanthu Parthaya	Susheelamma	
2016	Marubhoomiyile Aana	Jewellery owner's wife	
2016	Kavi Uddheshichathu..?	Jimmy's mother	
2017	Chakkaramaavin Kombathu	Alimammuka's wife	
2017	Munthirivallikal Thalirkkumbol	Girija	
2018	Kaithola Chathan	Prakashan's mother	
2018	Aanakkallan	Kochuthresia	
2018	Thattumpurath Achuthan	Girija	
2019	Margamkali	Urmila's mother	
2019	Kodathi Samaksham Balan Vakeel	Balan's mother, Vishalam	
2019	Moonam Pralayam	KPAC Sarasamma	
2022	Super Sharanya	Deepu's mother	
2022	Varayan	Thresia	
2022	Rorschach	Seetha	
2023	Madhura Manohara Moham	Ushamma	
2023	Anakku Enthinte Keda		
2024	Marivillin Gopurangal	Sherin's mother	
2024	Turbo	Rosakutty	
2024	Hello Mummy	Kanchamma / Professor	
2024	Jameelante Poovan Kozhi	Jameela	
2025	Prince and Family	Jancy Chakkalakkal	
2025	Thug		
2026	Madhuvidhu	Gynaecologist	Cameo
2026	Bethlehem Kudumba Unit	Sister Cicily / Kunjaunty	

== Television ==
- 1995: Moharavam (Doordarshan)
- 2005: Sahadharmini (Asianet)
- Ellam Mayajalam (Asianet)
- Santhanagopalam (Asianet)
- Snehathinte Mullukal (Doordarshan)
- Ayyadi Maname (Kairali TV)
- Snehasammanam
- Manalnagaram
- Naalukettu
- Vamsham
- Roses in December
- Thatteem Mutteem
