= Vipin Mohan =

Indian cinematographer and film director

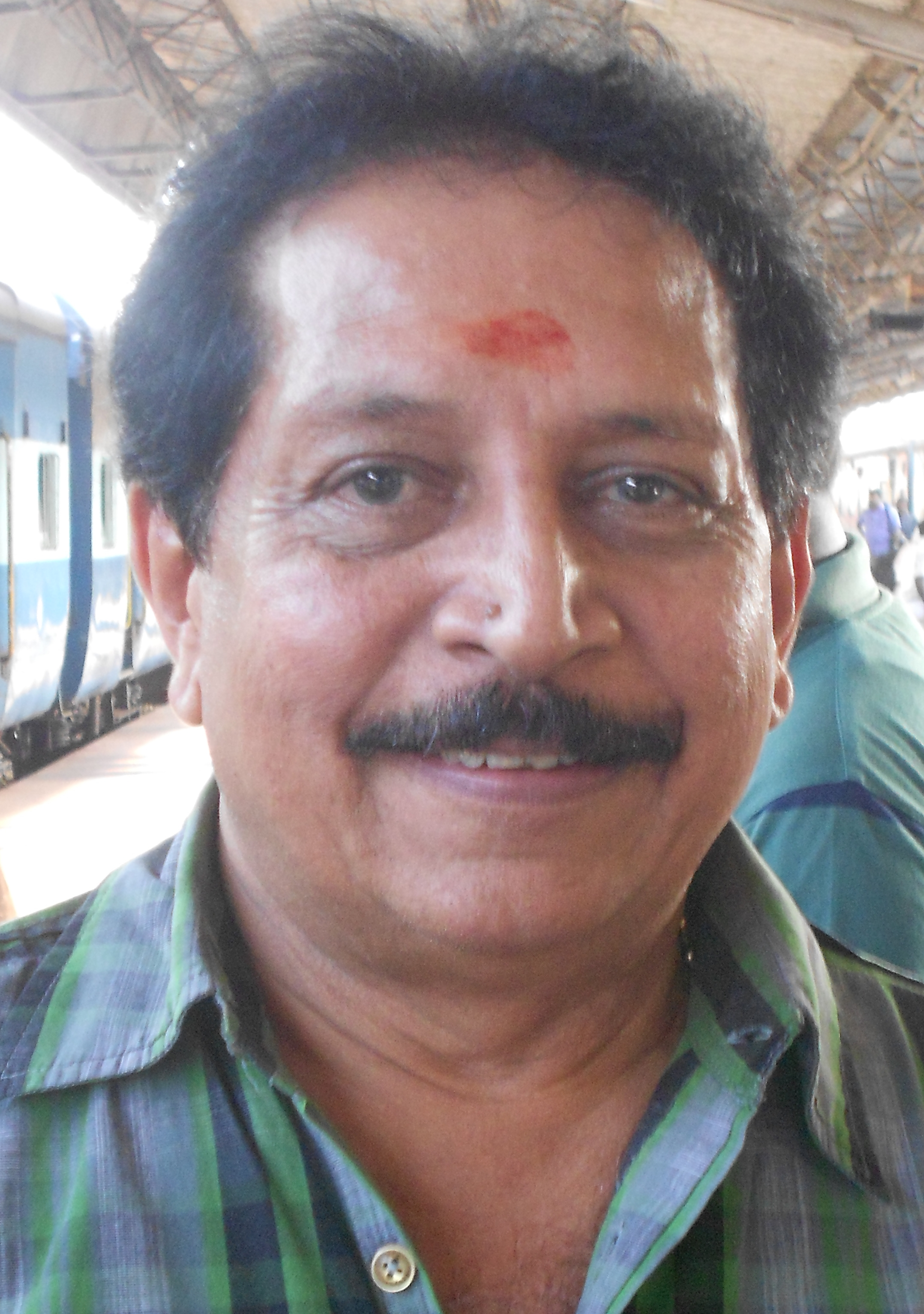
- Born: 1950 (age 75–76)
- Occupations: Film director and cinematographer
- Years active: 1979–present
- Spouse: Girija
- Children: Vivek, Manjima Mohan
- Awards: Kerala State Film Award for Best Cinematography, 1981

Vipin Mohan is an Indian cinematographer and film director who works mainly in Malayalam cinema.

He worked as a cinematographer for over a hundred Malayalam films. Some of his notable works include Nadodikkattu (1987), Kakkothikkavile Appooppan Thaadikal (1988), Varavelpu (1989), Thalayana Manthram (1990), and Sandesam (1991). He made his directorial debut with the film Pattanathil Sundaran. He became an independent cinematographer with Njattadi after previously assisting renowned cinematographer Madhu Ambat.

He acted as a child artist in the film Neelakuyil (1954) when he was 4 years old. In the 2010 film Best Actor, he appeared in a guest role as a judge for a reality show.

He composed music for the film Kanakachilanka (1990), released in 1990.

== Early life ==
Vipin Mohan was born in Patturaikkal, Thrissur, Kerala into a Malayalam-speaking family as the son of Ramanatha Menon and Parukutti Amma.

== Family ==
Vipin Mohan currently lives in Kowdiar, Thiruvananthapuram. His wife is Girija, who played the lead role in the film Njattadi (1979). Their daughter Manjima won the Kerala State Film Award for Best Child Artist in 2000 for her performance in the film Madhuranombarakattu. Tamil actor Gautham Karthik is his son-in-law.

== Films cinematographed ==
1. Kuruvipappa (2024)
2. Paykappal (2022)
3. Mattancherry (2018)
4. Gandhinagaril Unniyarcha (2017)
5. Ellam Chettante Ishtam Pole (2015)
6. Pedithondan (2014)
7. My Dear Mummy (2014)
8. Vellaripravinte Changathi (2011)
9. Bombay March 12 (2011)
10. Ithu Nammude Katha (2011)
11. Mummy & Me (2010)
12. My Big Father (2009)
13. Kaana Kanmani (2009)
14. Samayam (2009)
15. Calendar (2009)
16. Heylassa (2009)
17. Magic Lamp (2008)
18. Mulla (2008)
19. One Way Ticket (2008)
20. Changathipoocha (2007)
21. Pakal (2006)
22. Otta Nanayam (2005)
23. Kalari Vikraman (2003)
24. Thillana Thillana (2003)
25. Yathrakarude Sradhakku (2002)
26. Randam Bhavam (2001)
27. Narendran Makan Jayakanthan Vaka (2001)
28. Priyam (2000)
29. Kochu Kochu Santhoshangal (2000)
30. Veendum Chila Veettukaryangal (1999)
31. Pattabhishekam (1999)
32. Oro Viliyum Kathorthu (1998)
33. Nakshatratharattu (1998)
34. Mayilpeelikkavu (1998)
35. Kalyana Kacheri (1997)
36. Irattakuttikalude Achan (1997)
37. Mannadiar Penninu Chenkotta Checkan (1997)
38. Oral Mathram (1997)
39. Kaliyoonjal (1997)
40. Thooval Kottaram (1996)
41. Mr. Clean (1996)
42. Kalyana Sougandhikam (1996)
43. Aramana Veedum Anjoorekkarum (1996)
44. Simhavalan Menon (1995)
45. No. 1 Snehatheeram Bangalore North (1995)
46. Vadhu Doctoranu (1994)
47. Santhanagopalam (1994)
48. Pingami (1994)
49. Ghoshayaathra (1993)
50. Bhagyavan (1993)
51. Addeham Enna Iddeham (1993)
52. Golanthara Vartha (1993)
53. Samooham (1993)
54. Snehasagaram (1992)
55. Chevalier Mikhayel (1992)
56. Pandu Pandoru Rajakumari (1992)
57. Aardram (1992)
58. My Dear Muthachan (1992)
59. Kankettu (1991)
60. Ennum Nanmakal (1991)
61. Sandesham (1991)
62. Kanalkkattu (1991)
63. Kouthuka Varthakal (1990)
64. Thalayana Manthram (1990)
65. Sasneham (1990)
66. Kalikkalam (1990)
67. Swagatham (1989)
68. Mazhavilkavadi (1989)
69. Peruvannapurathe Visheshangal (1989)
70. Artham (1989)
71. Varavelpu (1989)
72. Ponmuttayidunna Tharavu (1988)
73. Kudumbapuranam (1988)
74. Kakkothikkavile Appooppan Thaadikal (1988)
75. Pattanapravesam (1988)
76. Orkkappurathu (1988)
77. Swargam (1987)
78. Ayitham (1987)
79. Sarvakalashala (1987)
80. Nadodikkattu (1987)
81. Sreedharante Onnam Thirumurivu (1987)
82. Mizhineerppoovukal (1986)
83. Oru Yugasandhya (1986)
84. Sanmanassullavarkku Samadhanam (1986)
85. Ice Cream (1986)
86. Nandi Veendum Varika (1986)
87. Gandhinagar 2nd Street (1986)
88. T.P. Balagopalan M.A. (1986)
89. Ambada Njaane! (1985)
90. Scene No. 7 (1985)
91. Guruji Oru Vakku (1985)
92. Ente Ammu Ninte Thulasi Avarude Chakki (1985)
93. Puli Varunne Puli (1985)
94. Ayanam (1985)
95. Oduvil Kittiya Vartha (1985)
96. Oru Painkilikatha (1984)
97. April 18 (1984)
98. Ariyaatha Veethikal (1984)
99. Parasparam (1983)
100. Oomana Thinkal (1983)
101. Oru Swakaryam (1983)
102. Sesham Kazhchayil (1983)
103. Prasnam Gurutharam (1983)
104. Sheshakriya (1982)
105. Veena Poovu (1982)
106. Kilukilukkam (1982)
107. Kaattile Paattu (1982)
108. Kelkkaatha Sabdham (1982)
109. Aparna (1981)
110. Prema Geethangal (1981)
111. Archana Teacher (1981)
112. Njattadi (1979)

== Films directed ==
- Pattanathil Sundaran (2003)

== Awards ==
Year	Film	Award	Category	Notes
1981	Aparna	The Kerala State Film Award	Best Cinematographer	Black & white
