= Manjima Mohan =

Indian actress (born 1993)

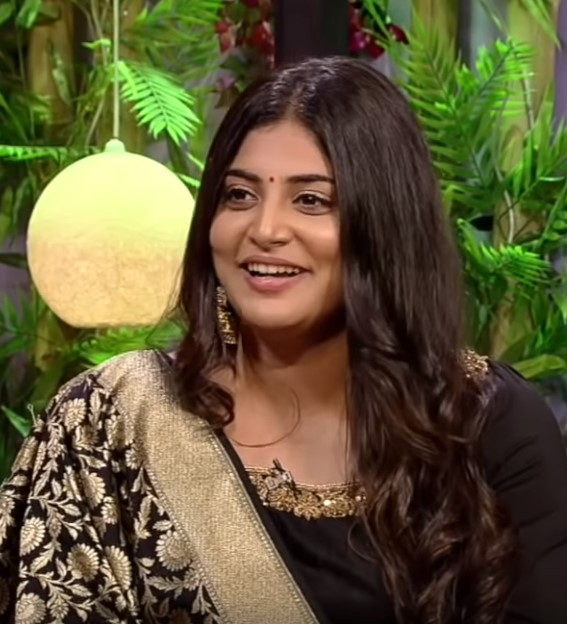
- Manjima in 2019
- Born: 11 March 1993 (age 33); Thiruvananthapuram, Kerala, India
- Education: Stella Maris College, Chennai
- Occupations: Actress; TV host
- Years active: 1997–2001 (child artist); 2015–present
- Spouse: Gautham Ram Karthik (m. 2022)
- Parents: Vipin Mohan (father); Kalamandalam Girija (mother)

Manjima Mohan is an Indian actress who primarily appears in Tamil, Malayalam and Telugu films. She started her career as a child artist in Malayalam films. she made her debut as a lead actress with Oru Vadakkan Selfie (2015) in Malayalam and Achcham Enbadhu Madamaiyada (2016) in Tamil. She won the Filmfare Award for Best Female Debut – South in 2017.

== Personal life ==
Manjima is the daughter of veteran cinematographer Vipin Mohan and dancer Kalamandalam Girija. After completing her schooling at Nirmala Bhavan Higher Secondary School, Thiruvananthapuram, Kerala, she pursued a B.Sc. degree in mathematics from Stella Maris College, Chennai, Tamil Nadu. She married actor Gautham Ram Karthik on 28 November 2022.

== Career ==
Manjima was a leading child artist in Malayalam film industry in early 2000s later she also hosted a television call-in show for kids by the name ‘'Hai Kids'’ on Surya TV for three years which rose her fame among Malayali audience.

Despite having had acting experience, she said that she was "not at all confident" when she started shooting for the film and that the initial days were "terrifying". Oru Vadakkan Selfie, which was directed by G. Prajith and scripted by Vineeth Sreenivasan, featured Manjima Mohan as the female lead.

Upon the release of Oru Vadakkan Selfie, Manjima landed her first Tamil film, Achcham Enbadhu Madamaiyada. Its director Gautham Vasudev Menon, who was impressed with her work in Oru Vadakkan Selfie, cast Manjima as the female lead, after she had gone through an audition.

In 2017 she had two Tamil films, one opposite Udhayanidhi Stalin - Ippadai Vellum and the other, Sathriyan, opposite Vikram Prabhu. In 2019, she made her come back to Malayalam with Mikhael opposite Nivin Pauly for the second time . She also has a few Tamil films in her career, including Tughlaq Durbar with Vijay Sethupathi, and Raashii Khanna. Her first release in 2023 was a Horror Thriller film Boo directed by A. L. Vijay that directly premiered on JioCinema. and in 2025, she made special appearance in Suzhal: The Vortex season 2.

== Filmography ==
=== Films ===
†	Denotes films that have not yet been released

Year	Title	Role	Language	Notes	Ref.
1997	Kaliyoonjal	Younger Ammu	Malayalam	Child artist	
1998	Mayilpeelikkavu	Gayathri's relative	Malayalam	Child artist	
1999	Saaphalyam	Sreethumol	Malayalam	Child artist	
2000	Priyam	Anu	Malayalam	Child artist	
2000	Thenkasipattanam	Younger Devootty	Malayalam	Child artist	
2000	Madhuranombarakattu	Maya	Malayalam	Child artist	
2000	Kabooliwala		Malayalam	Child artist	
2001	Sundara Purushan	Suryanarayanan's daughter	Malayalam	Child artist	
2015	Oru Vadakkan Selfie	Daisy George	Malayalam	Debut as lead	
2016	Achcham Yenbadhu Madamaiyada	Leela Raman	Tamil		
2016	Sahasam Swasaga Sagipo	Leela	Telugu		
2017	Sathriyan	Niranjana	Tamil		
2017	Ippadai Vellum	Bhargavi	Tamil		
2019	NTR: Kathanayakudu	Nara Bhuvaneshwari	Telugu		
2019	NTR: Mahanayakudu	Nara Bhuvaneshwari	Telugu		
2019	Mikhael	Mary	Malayalam		
2019	Devarattam	Madhu	Tamil		
2021	Kalathil Sandhippom	Kavya	Tamil		
2021	Tughlaq Durbar	Manimegalai	Tamil		
2022	FIR	Prarthana Raman	Tamil		
2023	Boo	Neelu	Tamil / Telugu	Released on JioCinema	

Television

List of Manjima Mohan television credits
Year	Title	Role	Notes
2025	Suzhal: The Vortex	Nagamma	Season 2

== Awards and nominations ==
Year	Award	Category	Film	Result
2001	Asianet Film Awards	Best child artist	Priyam	Won
2001	Kerala State Film Award	Kerala State Film Award for Best Child Artist	Madhuranombarakattu	Won
2001	Kerala State Television Award	Kerala State Television Award for Best Child Artist	Kabulivaala	Won
2016	SIIMA	Best Debut-Female (Malayalam)	Oru Vadakkan Selfie	Nominated
2017	Filmfare Award	Filmfare Award for Best Female Debut – South	Achcham Yenbadhu Madamaiyada	Won
2017	6th South Indian International Movie Awards	Best Debut-Female (Tamil)	Achcham Yenbadhu Madamaiyada	Nominated
2017	Edison Awards (India)	Best debut actress	Achcham Yenbadhu Madamaiyada	Won
