= Snehasagaram =

- Directed by: Sathyan Anthikad
- Written by: J. Pallassery
- Screenplay by: J. Pallassery
- Produced by: Siyad Kokker
- Starring: Murali; Urvashi; Manoj K. Jayan; Sunitha
- Cinematography: Vipin Mohan
- Edited by: K. Rajagopal
- Music by: Johnson
- Release date: 1992
- Country: India
- Language: Malayalam

Snehasagaram is a 1992 Indian Malayalam film, directed by Sathyan Anthikad, starring Murali, Urvashi, Manoj K. Jayan and Sunitha in the lead roles.

== Plot ==
Josekutty and Treesa, a happily married couple, move to a town in Tamil Nadu. However, Treesa begins suspecting Josekutty of getting attracted to Kaveri, a playful young woman.

== Cast ==
- Murali as Josekutty
- Sunitha as Kaveri
- Urvasi as Teresa Josekutty
- Manoj K. Jayan as Muthu
- Innocent as Ramayyan
- Oduvil Unnikrishnan as Vishnunarayan Nambuthiri
- Nedumudi Venu as Thankachan
- Jalaja as Marykunju
- Meena Ganesh as Kunjammuma
- Bobby Kottarakkara as Chellappan
- Janagaraj as Pazhaniyappa Gounder
- Ragini as Padmini
- KPAC Lalitha
- Philomina
- Sankaradi

== Soundtrack ==
Snehasagaram

Soundtrack album by Johnson
- Genre: Film
- Language: Malayalam

All lyrics are written by Kaithapram Damodaran; all music is composed by Johnson.

No.	Title	Artist(s)	Length
1.	"Akalathakalathu"	K. S. Chithra, M. G. Sreekumar
2.	"Peelikkannezhuthi"	K. S. Chithra, G. Venugopal
3.	"Thankanilaa"	K. S. Chithra
4.	"Therottam"	M. G. Sreekumar, Minmini
