= Anantha Vruthantham =

- Directed by: P. Anil
- Written by: J. Pallassery
- Produced by: Anil Placheril
- Starring: Sai Kumar; Ranjini
- Cinematography: Vasanthkumar
- Music by: Judi
- Release date: 1990
- Country: India
- Language: Malayalam

Anantha Vruthantham (അനന്ത വൃത്താന്തം, lit: Infinite accounts) is a 1990 Indian Malayalam-language film directed by P. Anil. The film stars Sai Kumar and Ranjini in the lead roles.

== Cast ==
- Sai Kumar as Dr. Ananthan
- Ranjini as Laeticia
- Usha as Vijayalakshmi
- Innocent as Padmanabha Iyer
- Sukumari as Merzy
- Jagathy Sreekumar as Radhakrishnan
- Manoj K. Jayan as Kishore
- Vijay Menon as Franky
- Mamukkoya as Thanoor Thaha
- Meena as Subammal
- Lalithasree as Police
