= Ponnaranjanam =

- Directed by: Babu Narayanan
- Written by: Purushan Alappuzha; Babu Narayanan (dialogues)
- Screenplay by: Purushan Alappuzha
- Produced by: Hameed
- Starring: Usha; Jahnvi; Mahesh; Innocent; Adoor Bhavani; K. B. Ganesh Kumar
- Cinematography: V. Aravindakshan
- Edited by: G. Murali
- Music by: Kozhikode Yesudas
- Production company: Gemi Movies
- Distributed by: Gemi Movies
- Release date: 1990
- Country: India
- Language: Malayalam

Ponnaranjanam is a 1990 Indian Malayalam-language film, directed by Babu Narayanan and produced by Hameed. The film stars Usha, Jahnvi, Mahesh, Innocent and Adoor Bhavani. The film's score was composed by Kozhikode Yesudas. Lesbian is the main theme of the film. The film received a dubbed version in Hindi as Galat Sambandh. There also exists a rare uncut/uncensored version of the film

== Plot ==
Rosy (Jahnvi) is attracted to Ponnu (Usha) who doesn't like the attention. Ponnu is in a relationship with Vinu. Rosy seeks Gilbert's help to sabotage Ponnu and Vinu's relationship.

== Cast ==
- Usha as Padinjare Manakkal Savithri/Ponnu
- Mahesh as Vinu
- Jahnvi/Devishri as Rosy Chakko
- K. B. Ganesh Kumar as Gilbert
- Bhuvana Saravana
- Innocent as Thirumeni/Savithri's father
- Adoor Bhavani
- Baiju Santhosh as Mathappan
- Mala Aravindan as Ayyappan
- Mamukkoya as Ummukoya
- Kanakalatha as Ayyapan's Wife
- Usha Thenginthodiyil as Shantha Nedungadi

== Soundtrack ==
The music was composed by Kozhikode Yesudas with lyrics by R. K. Damodaran.

No.	Song	Singers	Lyrics	Length (m:ss)
1	"Pennil Pennaay"	K. J. Yesudas	R. K. Damodaran	
2	"Ponnaranjaanam" (F)	K. S. Chithra	R. K. Damodaran	
3	"Ponnaranjaanam" (M)	K. J. Yesudas	R. K. Damodaran	
4	"Theeram Prakrithi"	K. S. Chithra	R. K. Damodaran	
