= Kottayam Nazeer =

Indian actor & impressionist (born 1973)

- Born: Nazeer P. Aziz; 29 May 1973 (age 53); Karukachal, Kerala, India
- Occupations: Actor; comedian; mimicry artist; film producer; screenwriter
- Years active: 1995–present
- Known for: Malayalam films; Stage shows; Mimicry performance
- Spouse: Hazeena Nazeer
- Children: 2

Kottayam Nazeer is an Indian actor, impressionist, and an artist from Kerala. Kottayam Nazeer started his career as a stage artist . Recently he also started his career in painting. Nazeer is a recipient of the Kerala Sangeetha Nataka Akademi Award (2010) and is the only recipient in the Mimicry category.

== Family ==
Nazeer is married to Haseena. They have two sons, Mohammed Nihal and Mohammed Noufal.

== Filmography ==
=== 1990s ===
Year	Title	Role	Notes
1995	Mimics Action 500	Krishnankutty	
1995	Kidilol Kidilam	Johnson	
1996	Mr. Clean	Velayudhan	
1996	KL-7-95 Ernakulam North	Salim	
1996	Aramana Veedum Anjoorekkarum	Satheeshan	
1997	Mannadiar Penninu Chenkotta Checkan		
1998	Mattupetti Machan		
1998	Aaghosham	Sethu	
1998	Meenakshi Kalyanam		
1998	Anuragakottaram		
1999	Udayapuram Sulthan	Kasim	
1999	Mazhavillu		
1999	My Dear Karadi	Philippose	
1999	Aakasha Ganga	Keshavan	
1999	Pattabhishekam	Sub-Inspector	

=== 2000s ===
Year	Title	Role	Notes
2000	Nadan Pennum Natupramaniyum	Veeramani	
2000	Sahayathrikakku Snehapoorvam		
2001	Koodariyathe		
2001	Korappan the Great	Sasi	
2001	Aparenmar Nagarathil	Ramdas	
2001	Sundara Purushan	Mental Patient	
2002	Jagathy Jagadeesh in Town	Govind	
2002	www.Anukudumbam.com		
2002	Kayamkulam Kanaran	Sunny	
2002	Ee Bhargavi Nilayam		
2002	Kattuchembakam	Ponnappan	
2003	Njan Salperu Ramankutty	Himself	
2004	Govindankutty Thirakkilanu	SI Jackie Chan	
2004	Youth Festival		
2004	Vamanapuram Bus Route	Chackochan	
2004	Campus	Attender	Tamil film
2005	Kalyanakurimanam		
2006	Red Salute	Ramanan	
2006	Shyamam	Thankappan	
2007	Katha Parayumpol	Idikkatta Varkey	
2007	Anchil Oral Arjunan	Dineshan Mudiyoor	
2007	Sooryan		
2008	Cycle		
2008	Bullet		
2008	Parthan Kanda Paralokam	Sulaiman	
2008	SMS	Chacko	
2008	Magic Lamp	Dr. Omanakuttan	
2009	Gulumaal: The Escape	Appy Biju	
2009	Venalmaram	Jaffer Kunnakulam	

=== 2010s ===
Year	Title	Role	Notes
2010	Oru Naal Varum		
2010	Kadaksham		
2010	Oru Small Family	Blade Vasu	
2010	Avan	Kurian Thomas	
2010	Aakasha Yathra		
2010	Malarvaadi Arts Club	Prem	
2010	Canvas	Manmadhan	
2011	Kudumbasree Travels	George Kutty	
2011	Sandwich	Ammini Kumar	
2011	The Filmstaar	Krishnan Karakulam	
2011	Kathayile Nayika	Goon	
2011	Manikyakkallu	Pavanan Parimanam	
2011	Teja Bhai & Family	Police officer	
2012	Oru Kudumba Chithram	Vakkeel	
2012	Blackberry		
2012	Jawan of Vellimala	Rafi	
2012	916	S.I. Babu	
2012	Doctor Innocentanu	Pootturukki Pushpan	
2012	Hero	Basha	
2013	Bavuttiyude Namathil	Sreenivasan	
2013	Vallatha Pahayan	Ravi	
2013	Vaidooryam		
2013	Athade		Telugu debut
2013	Actress		
2013	Kilikal Paadum Gramam		
2013	Kauthukalokam		
2013	Ithu Mantramo Thantramo Kuthantramo?		
2013	Kadal Kadannu Oru Maathukutty	Kunjumon	
2013	For Sale	Musthafa	
2013	Pottas Bomb	Mohanan	
2013	Daivathinte Swantham Cleetus	Varghese	
2014	Garbhashreeman		
2014	Asha Black	Thambi	
2015	John Honai	Gunda	
2015	Loka Samastha	Vignesh	
2016	Kattappanayile Rithwik Roshan	Director Ajayan	Guest Appearance
2017	Sherlock Toms	S.I Shinto	
2018	Aravindante Athidhikal	Sreekrishnan	
2018	Chalakkudikkaran Changathi	Hungry Director	
2019	Brother's Day	Joy	

=== 2020s ===
Year	Title	Role	Notes
2020	B Nilavarayum Sharjah Palliyum	Balan	
2021	Keshu Ee Veedinte Nadhan	Gopi	
2022	Rorschach	Shashankan	
2023	Ayalvaashi	Baby	
2023	Janaki Jaane	P. R. Shaji	
2023	Pappachan Olivilanu	Xavier	
2023	Rani Chithira Marthanda		
2024	Jerry		
2024	Anweshippin Kandethum	DySP Alex	
2024	Thalavan	CPO Reghu	
2024	DNA	SI Sreejith	
2024	Vaazha - Biopic of a Billion Boys	Radhakrishnan	
2024	Oru Anweshanathinte Thudakkam	Seban/Thankachan	
2025	Alappuzha Gymkhana	Salim	
2025	Detective Ujjwalan	Narayanakutty	
2026	Shukran		
2026	Unmadham	Sathyajith	
2026	Avaraachan & Sons		
2026	Jailer 2	Ameer	Tamil film

== Dubbing artist ==
- Enthiran-voice for Cochin Haneefa
- Madrasapattinam -voice for Cochin Haneefa
- Thalamelam-voice for Jagathy Sreekumar
- Mattupetti Machan-voice for Kochu Preman
- The Campus-voice for Narendra Prasad
- Valathottu Thirinjal Nalamathe Veedu-voice for Narendra Prasad

== Television ==
- Comic Cola (Asianet)
- Comedy Show (Asianet)
- Cinemala (Asianet)
- Comedy Time (Surya TV)
- Kadamattathu Kathanar (TV series) (Asianet)
- Gulumal (Surya TV)
- Chirikum Pattanam (Kairali TV)
- Kerala Cafe (Kairali TV)
- Cinema Chirima (Mazhavil)
- Evidingananu Bhai (Mazhavil)
- 25 Kottayam Nazeer Show (Flowers TV)
- Flowers Comedy Awards (Flowers TV)
- Jollywood (Kairali TV)
- Comedy Utsavam (Flowers TV)
- Comedy Circus (Mazhavil)
- Chaya Koppayile Kodumkaatu (Mazhavil)
- Comedy Masters (Amrita TV)
- Comedy Stars Season 2 (Asianet)
- Oru Chiri Iru Chiri Bumper Chiri (Mazhavil Manorama)
