= Njattadi =

- Directed by: Bharath Gopi
- Written by: T.K. Kochu Narayanan
- Produced by: K.N. Sreenivasan, T.K. Kochu Narayanan
- Starring: Bharat Murali; K.N. Sreenivasan; Sunil; Girija; Kalamandalam Devaki
- Cinematography: Vipin Mohan
- Release date: 1979
- Country: India
- Language: Malayalam

Njattadi is a 1979 Malayalam movie directed by Bharath Gopi and written by T.K. Kochu Narayanan, starring Bharat Murali, K.N. Sreenivasan, Sunil, Girija and Kalamandalam Devaki. It marked the debut directorial venture by Bharath Gopi and acting debut by Bharat Murali. It is a lost film.

== Plot ==
The film is based on the life of the protagonist Unni, who is moved by Naxal ideas. It was banned by the censor board because of the portrayal of naxal ideas. The film was screened only twice and its print is now lost.

== Cast ==
- Sunil as Unni
- Bharath Murali as Raghu
- V. R. Korappath
- Girija
- Kalamandalam Devaki

== Additional information ==
Vipin Mohan made his independent cinematographer debut with Njattadi after previously assisting renowned cinematographer Madhu Ambat.
