= Oro Viliyum Kathorthu =

- Directed by: V. M. Vinu
- Written by: Gireesh Puthenchery; Kaloor Dennis (dialogues)
- Screenplay by: Kaloor Dennis
- Produced by: Premkumar Marath
- Starring: Mukesh; Suma; Sukumari; Kalabhavan Mani; Adoor Bhavani
- Cinematography: Vipin Mohan
- Edited by: K. P. Hariharaputhran
- Music by: Berny-Ignatius
- Production company: Akshaya Arts International
- Distributed by: Akshaya Arts International
- Release date: 18 July 1998
- Country: India
- Language: Malayalam

Oro Viliyum Kathorthu is a 1998 Indian Malayalam-language film directed by V. M. Vinu and produced by Premkumar Marath. The film stars Mukesh, Suma, Sukumari, Kalabhavan Mani and Adoor Bhavani in the lead roles. The film has musical score by Berny-Ignatius. This was Suma's third and final Malayalam film as an actress.

== Cast ==
- Mukesh as Sreedharan
- Suma Kanakala as Subhadra
- Sukumari as Kalyani
- Adoor Bhavani as Lakshmi
- Kuthiravattam Pappu as Achuthan
- Kalabhavan Mani as Varunni
- Kalabhavan Narayanankutty as Jacky Vasu
- Biju Menon as Kesavan Kutty
- Mamukkoya as Kunjunni Nair
- N. F. Varghese as Iyyancheri Padmanabhan Nair
- Ponnamma Babu as Karthyayani
- Santha Devi as Oppol
- Shivaji Guruvayoor
- T. P. Madhavan as Judge
- Usharani as Janaki
- Usha as Snehalatha
- Priyanka as Vasanthi
- Trichur Elsi
- Ramadevi as Doctor

== Soundtrack ==
The music was composed by Berny-Ignatius with lyrics by Gireesh Puthenchery.

| No. | Song | Singers | Lyrics | Length (m:ss) |
|---|---|---|---|---|
| 1 | "Konnappookkal" | K. S. Chithra | Gireesh Puthenchery | |
| 2 | "Vidacholliyakalunna" | M. G. Sreekumar | Gireesh Puthenchery | |
