= Mannadiar Penninu Chenkotta Checkan =

- Directed by: P. Anil; Babu Narayanan
- Written by: A. K. Sajan; A. K .Santhosh
- Screenplay by: A. K. Sajan; A. K. Santhosh
- Starring: Mukesh; Kanaka; Jagathy Sreekumar; Innocent
- Cinematography: Vipin Mohan
- Edited by: P. C. Mohanan
- Music by: Raveendran
- Production company: Rajsagar Films
- Distributed by: Rajsagar Films
- Release date: 17 January 1997
- Country: India
- Language: Malayalam

Mannadiar Penninu Chenkotta Checkan is a 1997 Indian Malayalam-language film, directed by P. Anil and Babu Narayanan. The film stars Mukesh, Kanaka, Jagathy Sreekumar and Innocent in the lead roles. The film has musical score by Raveendran.

== Plot ==
Aarcha is the young matriarch of Mannadiar family. She hates men and her 4 brothers are her bodyguards. She has made them divorce their wives for personal whims. Because of her pampered life, she considered everyone whom she hates as inferior to her. In such a depraved egoistic life she played with Sethuraman's feeling during her college days. Through an unexpected turn of events, Sethuraman gets into her family as their family lawyer and attempts to change the power dynamics and marry Aarcha, because he once loved her whole heartedly.

== Cast ==
- Mukesh as Adv. Chenkotta Sethuraman
- Kanaka as Aarcha / Sundari Sethuraman
- Jagathy Sreekumar as Eswaran Vakkeel
- Innocent as Gajendra Mannadiar
- Cochin Haneefa as Veerendra Mannadiar
- Subair as Narendra Mannadiar
- Baiju as Rajendra Mannadiar
- Kalabhavan Mani as Madhavan
- Augustine Velayudhan, S.I. Ayyappan's nephew
- C. I. Paul as S.I. Ayyappan
- Salim Kumar as Marmmaadi
- Kalpana as Chamba
- KPAC Lalitha as Pushpavalli
- Zeenath as Leelamani
- Bindu Panicker as Thilothoma
- Anusha as Manju, Sethuraman's sister
- Harishree Ashokan as Aromal
- Bobby Kottarakkara as Komalan
- Meghanathan as Natesan
- Salu Koottanad
- Kottayam Nazeer
- T. P. Madhavan as Vakeel
- Adoor Bhavani as Vayattatti
- Meena Ganesh as Vayattati's daughter

== Soundtrack ==
The music was composed by Raveendran and the lyrics were written by P. K. Gopi.

| No. | Song | Singers | Lyrics | Length (m:ss) |
|---|---|---|---|---|
| 1 | "Ankam Jayiche" | Mano | P. K. Gopi | |
| 2 | "Nercha Kunkuma" | G. Venugopal, Chorus, Krishnachandran | P. K. Gopi | |
| 3 | "Poli Poliye" (Perumathudi Kotti Varunne) | Pradip Somasundaran | P. K. Gopi | |

== Reception ==
A critic from Deccan Herald wrote that "Yet another shrew to be tamed, yet another slapstick comedy. That sums up Anil Babus film".
