= Pattabhishekam (1999 film) =

- Directed by: Anil–Babu
- Written by: Rajan Kiriyath; Vinu Kiriyath
- Starring: Jayaram; Mohini; Harisree Ashokan; Jagathy Sreekumar
- Cinematography: Vipin Mohan
- Edited by: P. C. Mohanan
- Music by: Berny-Ignatius
- Release date: 25 August 1999
- Country: India
- Language: Malayalam

Pattabhishekam (transl. Coronation) is a 1999 Indian Malayalam-language action comedy film directed by Anil–Babu and starring Jayaram, Mohini, Harisree Ashokan and Jagathy Sreekumar. An elephant from Mangalamkunnu played the role of Lakshmikutty in the film. The film was a superhit at the box office success and became popular. After this film, Jayaram did other elephant-based films such as Aanachandam (2006) and Thiruvambadi Thamban (2012).

This film inspired by the 1996 Hollywood film Larger Than Life.

== Plot ==
Vishnu, a down on his luck man, comes into possession of Lakshmikutty, a cute but chaotic young elephant. Along with his friend Bhairavan, Vishnu tries find a way to solve his problems, which include a missing box of sacred ornaments, and the troubles caused by Lakshmikutty. They end up entering into the Ponnummadam Tharavadu, a well respected aristocratic family, in more ways than one, where Vishnu falls in love with Kalyani, the young heiress of the house, despite beginning on rocky terms. But everything changes when Vishnu and Bhairavan realiize that Valiya Thamburan, the silent, bedridden patriarch of the family, is the man who is in possession of that stolen ornament box. Aadhityan Thamburan, who wishes to become the next patriarch of the family, along with his cunning brother Balaraman, try everything in their might to foil Vishnu, who stands between them and the throne. Vishnu manages to save Valiya Thamburan from harm and reveals Balaraman, who was conspiring to become the next Thamburan himself, as the real culprit behind everything. He then manages to bring the stolen ornaments to the temple successfully with help from Bhairavan and Lakshmikutty. In the end, he unites with Kalyani, but then remembers that he still has to deal with Lakshmikutty and her antics.

== Cast ==
- Jayaram as Vishnunarayanan
- Mohini as Kalyani
- Harisree Ashokan as Bhairavan
- Jagathy Sreekumar as Aadhithyan Thamburan
- Jagannatha Varma as Valiya Thamburan
- Indrans as Kuttishankaran
- Salim Kumar as Illikkulam Kattumanakkal Ashtangahridayam Bhramadathan Moosad
- Augustine as Velappan,Vishnunarayanan's brother-in-law
- Bobby Kottarakkara as Mayilappan Vishnunarayanan's brother-in-law
- Kottayam Nazeer as Sub-Inspector Sundaran
- Zeenath as Aadhi Thampuran's wife
- Kannur Sreelatha as Bhanu
- E. A. Rajendran as Balaraman
- Abu Salim as Sathyan, Balaraman's henchman
- Kozhikode Narayanan Nair as Shekharankutty, Vishnunarayanan's father
- Jolly Easo
- Sudhakaran
- Rama Devi as Vishnunarayanan's mother
- Karthika Kannan
- Kamala Devi
- Sarada Nair as a grandmother
- Sridhar (cameo appearance in "Shankhumvenchamaram")

== Soundtrack ==
All lyrics are written by Bichu Thirumala; all music is composed by Berny–Ignatius.

| No. | Title | Artist(s) | Length |
|---|---|---|---|
| 1. | "Eazhamkooli" | M. G. Sreekumar | 03:59 |
| 2. | "Girijapathisukha" | K. J. Yesudas, Sujatha Mohan | 04:22 |
| 3. | "Poochapoochapenne" | M. G. Sreekumar | 04:01 |
| 4. | "Poovukal Peyyum" | K. J. Yesudas, Sujatha Mohan | 04:23 |
| 5. | "Shankhum Venchamaravum" | K. J. Yesudas | 04:13 |

== Reception ==
Writing for The Times of India in 2017, a writer wrote that "Malayalis’ love for elephants have been such that they have always extended their full support to films that has the animal playing a central role, be it the Jayaram starrer Pattabhishekam or the latest film Punyalan Agarbattis (2013)".

Writing for Zoom in 2020, a writer wrote that "This 1999 comedy-entertainer is memorable for so many reasons. This varies from the jokes of the duo Harisree Ashokan and Jayaram, the dance and music numbers or the comic skill of Jagathy Sreekumar, but when asked, everyone would immediately choose the playful elephant featured in the movie". Writing for The New Indian Express in 2021, a writer wrote that "The movie has some memorable scenes involving the man-animal trio of Jayaram, Harisree Ashokan and the calf, with the elephant race at the royal palace being the best".
