= Kalamandalam Kesavan =

Indian actor (1936–2009)

- Born: Kesavan; 18 May 1936; Peringode, Palakkad
- Died: 25 April 2009 (aged 72); Elamakkara, Kochi
- Occupation: Film actor
- Years active: 1998-2009
- Spouse: Parvathy
- Children: 3
- Parent(s): Vamanan Namboothiri, Janakiamma

Kalamandalam Kesavan was an Indian kathakali percussionist, playwright and actor in Indian cinema. He did roles in Malayalam movies during the 1990s and 2000s. He is popular for his role Payyarathu Padmanabhan Nair as Jayaram's father in the movie Katha Nayakan.

== Background ==
He was born on 18 May 1936 as the son of Kurukkattumanakkal Vamanan Namboothiri and Neettiyathu Janakiamma, at Peringode, Palakkad. He was noted for his performance in the films Kathanayakan and Vanaprastham and penned poems and written more than 40 short plays for Kathakali. He also contributed to the upliftment of Kathakali Ssangeetham. He joined the Kerala Kalamandalam in 1954, where he came under Kathakali masters like Kalamandalam Krishnankutty Poduval and Appunni Poduval. After graduating from Kalamandalam, Kesavan worked with Kala Sadanam, Chunangad and RLV Institute, Thripunithura. He also worked as a teacher at F.A.C.T Kathakali School as chenda master in Aluva for 30 years. He was the recipient of Kerala Sangeetha Nataka Akademi Award (1997), Kerala Kalamandalam Award, Kala Sahithya Academy Award for his Collection of poems Thenthully, Ravunni Menon Memorial Award and N.K. Pisharadi Award. After that he appeared in many films and television serials, portraying important characters. Kesavan made his debut movie in Marattam in 1988, directed by G. Aravindan. He was married to Parvathy. They had a daughter and two sons. He died on 25 April 2009 following a heart attack at his house Elamakkara, Kochi. He was 73.

== Partial filmography ==
- Vettam (2004)
- Soudamini (2003)
- Valathottu Thirinjal Nalamathe Veedu (2003)
- Swapnam Kondu Thulabharam (2003)
- Saivar Thirumeni (2001)
- Nadan Pennum Natupramaniyum (2000)
- Vaanaprastham (1999) .... Thirumeni
- Saaphalyam (1999)
- The Car (1997)
- Katha Nayakan (1997) .... Payyarathu Padmanabhan Nair Debut as Lead Role
- Marattam (1988) Debut Film

== Television ==
- Olakkuda (DD Malayalam)
