= Kalyana Kacheri =

1997 film

- Directed by: Anil Chandra
- Written by: A. Yesudas; Vinu Kiriyath (dialogues); Rajan Kiriyath (dialogues)
- Screenplay by: Vinu Kiriyath; Rajan Kiriyath
- Produced by: Babu Pathanamthitta
- Starring: Mukesh; Shobhana; Jagathy Sreekumar; KPAC Lalitha
- Cinematography: Vipin Mohan
- Edited by: P. C. Mohanan
- Music by: S. P. Venkatesh
- Production company: Crystal Visions
- Distributed by: Crystal Visions
- Release date: 24 December 1997
- Country: India
- Language: Malayalam

Kalyana Kacheri is a 1997 Indian Malayalam film, directed by Anil Chandra and produced by Babu Pathanamthitta. It stars Mukesh, Shobhana, Jagathy Sreekumar, and KPAC Lalitha in the lead roles. The film has a musical score by S. P. Venkatesh. It received positive reviews from critics and audiences alike as well as mixed appreciation and criticism for the family drama.

== Cast ==
- Mukesh as Ambadi Arjunan Nair
- Shobhana as Gopika Varma
- Jagathy Sreekumar as Ambadi Balaraman Nair
- Baiju Santhosh as Balanchandran
- KPAC Lalitha as Devakiyamma
- Darshana as Meenu
- M. R. Gopakumar
- Kanya Bharathi as Bhama
- Sindhu Jacob as Seetha Nair
- N. F. Varghese
- Ravi Vallathol as Ananthan Varma
- Augustine as Sub-Inspector Vargesh
- Bindu Ramakrishnan
- Kunjandi
- Mafia Sasi
- Mamukkoya as Bharghavan Pilla
- Kozhikode Narayanan Nair

== Plot ==
A contractor, Arjunan, has financial troubles and tries to fake suicide to escape debt. He gets caught by police along with a stranger, Gopika, who happens to be there. They lie to the cops that they are lovers and the police SI forces them to get married. After the incident, they part ways. Arjunan and his friend find her address and reach her village to create a ruckus. They discover that a different girl lives there and comes back. Meanwhile, his uncle's marriage gets fixed with Gopika. Arjunan opposes this proposal, talks to Gopika, and asks her to back out of this marriage. Gopika's family had some conflicts in the past, and they are creating issues in the present. Arjunan wants to prevent this marriage somehow, and this follows the rest of the story.

== Soundtrack ==
The music was composed by S. P. Venkatesh, and the lyrics were written by Gireesh Puthenchery.

No.	Song	Singers	Lyrics	Length (m:ss)
1	"Mangala Melangal"	K. J. Yesudas	Gireesh Puthenchery	
2	"Pakal Maayunnu"	Sujatha Mohan	Gireesh Puthenchery	
3	"Pakal Maayunnu"	K. J. Yesudas	Gireesh Puthenchery	
4	"Ponkinaavalle"	K. S. Chithra, P. Jayachandran	Gireesh Puthenchery	
