= Thalayana Manthram =

- Directed by: Sathyan Anthikkad
- Written by: Sreenivasan
- Starring: Sreenivasan; Jayaram; Urvashi; Parvathy; K. P. A. C. Lalitha
- Cinematography: Vipin Mohan
- Edited by: K. Rajagopal
- Music by: Johnson
- Release date: 1990
- Country: India
- Language: Malayalam

Thalayana Manthram (transl. Pillow talk) is a 1990 Indian Malayalam comedy-drama film directed by Sathyan Anthikkad and written by Sreenivasan. The film stars Sreenivasan, Jayaram, Urvashi and Parvathy. Urvashi's performance as Kanchana received widespread acclaim and is considered one of the best in her career.

== Plot ==
Sukumaran, his brother, Mohanan and their mother belong to a middle-class family and live happily. Sukumaran is a supervisor in a construction company named JK Constructions, and Mohanan is a shopkeeper. Mohanan has recently married Shailaja who is a bank employee and is from a rich family unlike Sukumaran's wife Kanchana. Shylaja's fortunate life with money and a job makes Kanchana envious of her. Kanchana slowly starts causing problems in the family by finding unnecessary issues which affects the smooth running of a peaceful family life. Finally, Sukumaran leaves their family house and starts living in a rented house with Kanchana and their daughter at Kanchana's need. The rented house is located in a posh colony wherein the residents are very rich.

Soon, Kanchana finds that living in luxury is not conducive to the economic situation of Sukumaran who is just a supervisor in a company. To match their social status, Kanchana lies to her new neighbours that her husband is an engineer in a construction company. Kanchana pushes Sukumaran with demands, like buying expensive home appliances, arranging a dance master for their daughter, sending her to an English medium school, buying an old car (in which Sukumaran would meet with an accident, thereby increasing their medical expenses and car repair charges), etc. The huge economic demands slowly crush Sukumaran and finally, affect him in the manner of creditors demanding their money back.

In order to meet their financial requirements, Sukumaran decides to cheat his employer by forgery. The authorities come to know about the truth and one day, when Sukumaran is already under heavy economic pressure, the police arrive and arrest him. The next day, because of the ill reputation caused by the family, the house owner drives Sukumaran's family out of their rented house. At this point, Mohanan comes to their rescue knowing about the situation where his brother has been led by the ill advice of his wife Kanchana. Mohanan arranges money by selling his wife's gold ornaments and repays the creditors. Sukumaran is finally released from jail. In the end, the family is re-united when Kanchana understands her mistakes.

== Cast ==
- Sreenivasan as Sukumaran
- Jayaram as Mohanan
- Urvashi as Kanchana, Sukumaran's wife
- Parvathy as Shylaja, Mohanan's wife
- Innocent as T.G. Daniel
- K. P. A. C. Lalitha as Devaki, mother of Sukumaran and Mohan
- Mammukoya as Kunjananthan Mesthiri
- Sukumari as Sulochana Thankappan
- Philomina as Paru ammayi
- Meena as Jiji Daniel
- Sankaradi as Thankappan
- T. P. Madhavan as Manager
- Oduvil Unnikrishnan as Pothuval Mash
- Paravoor Bharathan as Damodharan Pillai
- Jagadish as Bhasurachandran (Cameo)
- Kollam Thulasi as Dhamodharan Kartha (Cameo)
- Sindhu Manu Varma as Jojo Daniel

== Music ==
All lyrics are written by Kaithapram Damodaran; all music is composed by Johnson.

No.	Title	Artist(s)	Length
1.	"Maanam Niraye"	M. G. Sreekumar
2.	"Maayapponmaane"	K. S. Chithra
3.	"Thooval Vinnin Maarilthoovi"	Sujatha Mohan, G. Venugopal

== Awards ==
- Kerala State Film Award for Best Actress - Urvashi

== Box office ==
The film was a commercial success.
