= Mangalamkunnu Karnan =

Famous elephant that lived in Kerala

Mangalamkunnu Karnan (Nilavinte Thampuran)
- Species: Elephas maximus (Asian Elephant)
- Sex: Male
- Born: 1957–1961; Bihar, India
- Died: 28 January 2021 (aged 60-63); Ottapalam, India
- Nationality: India
- Years active: 1990-2019
- Known for: Thrissur Pooram, other poorams, Thalappokkam
- Owner: Mangalamkunnu Tharavadu
- Height: 2.98 m (9 ft 9 in)
- Named after: Karnan

Mangalamkunnu Karnan (born 1957–1961 – died 28 January 2021) was an elephant owned by the family which owns the largest number of captive elephants in Kerala, only behind Guruvayur devaswom. Karnan was known for his ability to raise his head up for a long time, thus able to win in many Thalappokkam (Heads-up) competitions giving him the name Nilavinte Thampuran, which translates into English as Emperor of Heights. Karnan was one of the celebrity elephants in Kerala with a large fan following.

Mangalamkunnu Ganapathy (now deceased), Mangalamkunnu Karnan, and Mangalamkunnu Ayyappan are the most famous elephants in the tharavadu. In 1989, Karnan was repatriated from Chapra in Bihar by the Manissery Haridas group. It was in 2000 that the Mangalamkunnu family bought Karnan. For the ninth year in a row, Karnan won the title for the Thalappokkam competition at the Sreekumara Ganesha Temple. He was also known for winning many Thalappokkam competitions across Kerala. He has acted in some movies and TV commercials. Along with the Malayalam movies Narasimham and Katha Nayakan, Karnan has appeared in the Bollywood movie Dil Se.. Due to age-related issues, Karnan died (aged 60 to 63) on 28 January 2021 after suffering a cardiac arrest.

== Filmography ==
- Narasimham
- Katha Nayakan
- Dil Se..

== See also ==
- List of individual elephants
