= Shobana =

Indian dancer and actress (born 1970)

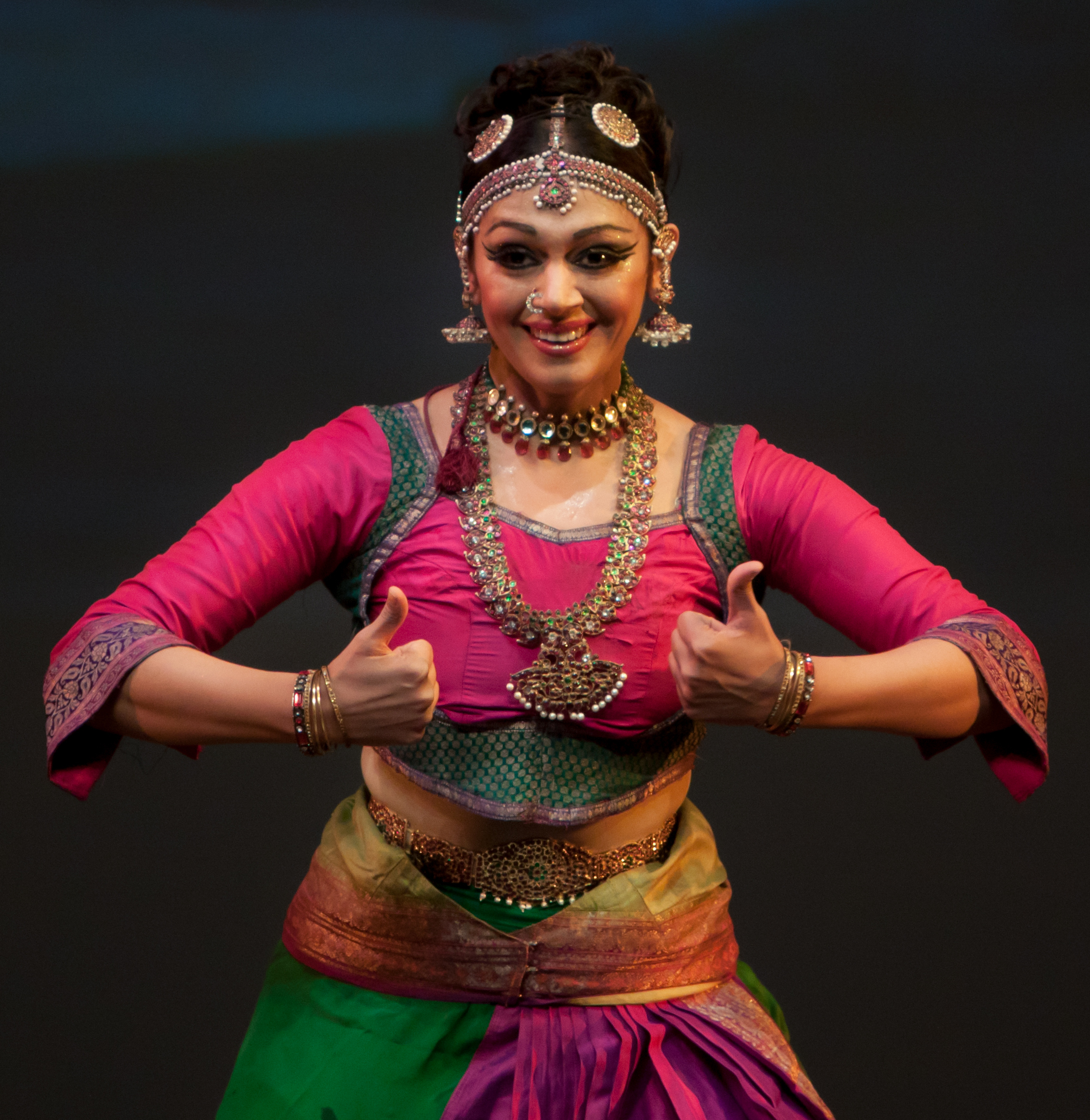
- Shobana in 2011
- Born: Shobana Chandrakumar Pillai; 21 March 1970 (age 56); Trivandrum, Kerala, India
- Occupations: Actress; dancer; choreographer
- Years active: 1980–present
- Children: 1
- Relatives: Travancore sisters (aunts); Vineeth (cousin); Parvathy (cousin)
- Family: Travancore family
- Awards: Padma Shri (2006); Kalaimamani (2011); Padma Bhushan (2025)
- Website: actressshobana.com

Shobana Chandrakumar Pillai (born 21 March 1970), known mononymously as Shobana, is an Indian actress and Bharatanatyam dancer who has appeared primarily in Malayalam cinema, along with notable work in Tamil, Telugu, Hindi, English and Kannada films. She is a recipient of two National Film Awards, one Kerala State Film Awards and two Filmfare Awards South. In 2011, she was honored with the Kalaimamani award by the Government of Tamil Nadu. Over the years, she has established herself as one of the leading South Indian actresses.

In a career spanning over four decades, Shobana has starred in over 230 films across several languages. She has earned two National Film Award for Best Actress for her performances in the Malayalam film Manichitrathazhu (1993) and the English film Mitr, My Friend (2001). The former also won her the Kerala State Film Award for Best Actress. Additionally, she received two Filmfare Award for Best Actress – Malayalam for her performances in Innale (1990) and Thenmavin Kombath (1994).

As a Bharatanatyam dancer, Shobana received her training under Chitra Visweswaran and Padma Subrahmanyam. She emerged as an independent performer and choreographer in her twenties and currently runs a dance school, Kalarpana, in Chennai. In 2006, the Government of India honored her with the Padma Shri for her contributions to the arts. In 2013, she received the Kerala Sangeetha Nataka Akademi Fellowship, also known as Kalarathna, for her contributions to the performing arts. She received honorary doctorates from Vinayaka Mission's Research Foundation in 2018, Dr. MGR Educational and Research Institute in 2019 and Sree Sankaracharya University of Sanskrit in 2022. Shobana was awarded Padma Bhushan, India's third-highest civilian award, in 2025.

== Early life ==
Shobana Chandrakumar Pillai was born on March 21, 1970, into a Malayali family in Kerala to Chandrakumar Pillai and Anandam Chandrakumar Pillai. She is the niece of the renowned Travancore sisters—Padmini, Lalitha and Ragini—who were celebrated for their expertise in classical Indian dance. Actor Vineeth and actress Parvathy Kurup are her cousins.

== Career ==
=== Film career ===
Shobana made her debut as a child artist. In 1980, she won the Best Child Artiste Award for her role in the Tamil movie, Mangala Nayagi, a remake of the Hindi film Saajan Bina Suhagan.

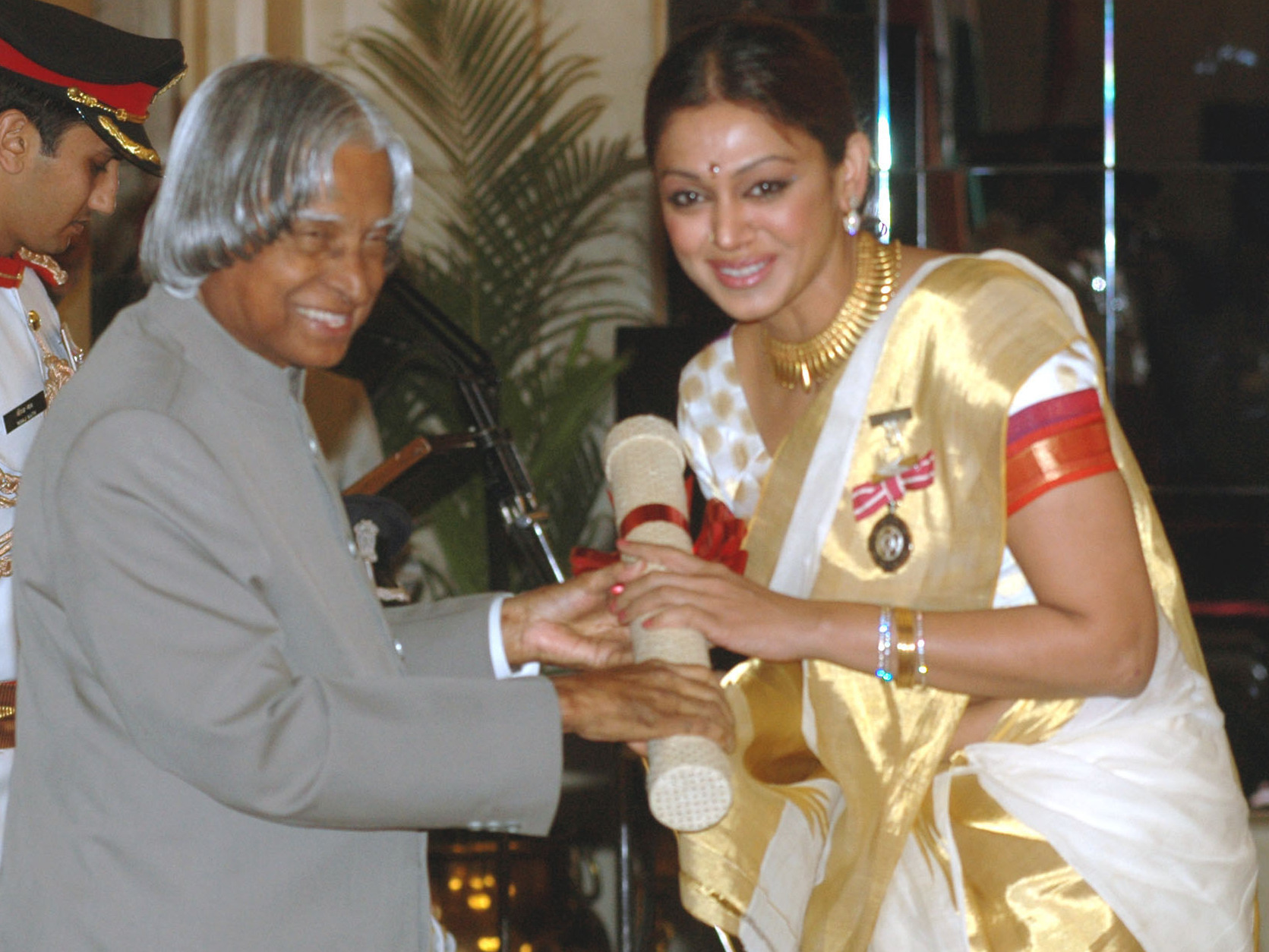
The President, Dr. A.P.J. Abdul Kalam presenting the Padma Shri Award – 2006 to Shobana in New Delhi on 20 March 2006.

She also starred in the Telugu film Bhakta Dhruva Markendaya in 1982, an acclaimed all children film made in both Tamil and Telugu. As an adult, she was introduced to the film industry through the Malayalam film April 18 (1984), by director Balachandra Menon. In the same year, she debuted in the Tamil film industry with Enakkul Oruvan (1984), directed by SP Muthuraman. She did come back to act in occasional Tamil films opposite Satyaraj (Mallu Vetti Minor, Vaathiyar Veetu Pillai), Bhagyaraj (Ithu Namma Aalu) and Vijayakanth (Ponmana Selvan, Engitta Mothathay) in the early 90s – these roles were generally glamorous in which Shobana generally acted as the beautiful, posh and haughty city girl who is eventually charmed by the village boy.

Her other major films include Rudraveena (1988), Kanamarayathu (1984) Ithiri Poove Chuvanna Poove, Yathra (1985), Anantaram (1987), Nadodikkattu (1987), Vellanakalude Nadu (1988), Idhu Namma Aalu (1988), Siva (1989), Innale (1990), Kalikkalam (1990), Thalapathi (1991), Pappayude Swantham Appoos (1992), Meleparambil Aanveedu (1993), Manichitrathazhu (1993), Thenmavin Kombath (1994), Minnaram (1994), Mazhayethum Munpe (1995), Hitler (1996), Agni Sakshi (1999), Dance like a Man (2003), Makalkku (2005), Thira (2013) and Varane Avashyamund (2020). From Aviduthe Pole Ivideyum to Upaharam, Shobana did sixteen movies in a single year, 1985. Shobana also acted in the Tamil period film Kochadaiiyaan (2014).

In Rudraveena (1988), alongside Chiranjeevi and Gemini Ganesan, she played classical dancer Lalitha Sivajyothi, who belongs to a lower caste and is denied entry into a temple. In Abhinandana (1988), she paired with Karthik, and essayed his love interest, who aspires to become a classical dancer. In Kokila (1990), she paired with Naresh, and In Alludugaru (1990) she starred opposite Mohan Babu and was a remake of Malayalam film Chithram. 1 April Vidudhala and Rowdy Gari Pellam were other Telugu films in 1991.

Shobana won her first National Film Award for Best Actress in 1993 for her performance in AM Fazil's Manichitrathazhu. Her portrayal of Ganga Nakulan and alter-ego Nagavalli in the film was described by critics as "spell binding".

Following her National Award win in 1993, Shobana became highly selective about her films.

=== Classical dance career ===
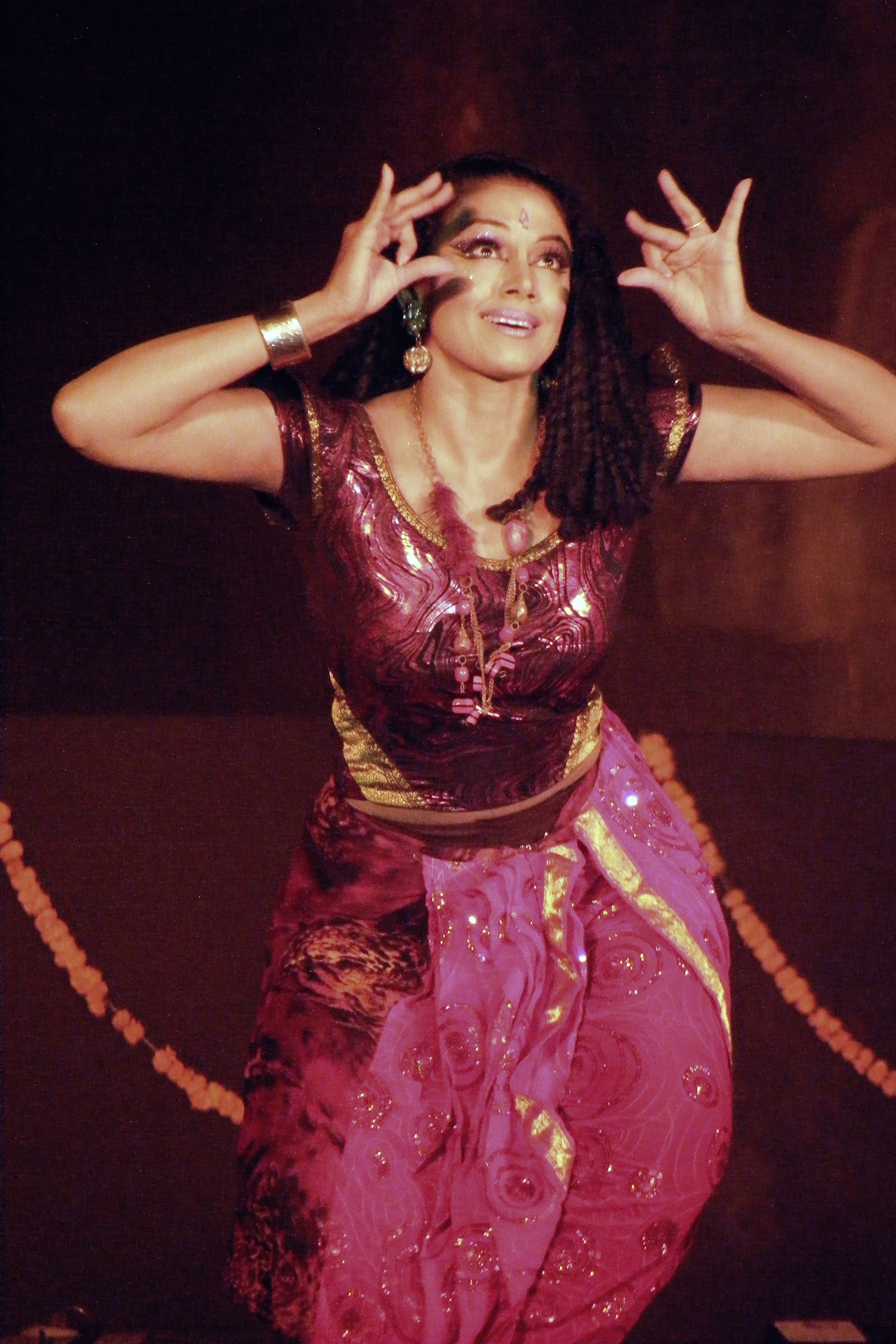
Shobana during a live classical dance performance

Shobana is a Bharatanatyam dancer. She started her own dance school, "Kalipinya" in 1989 and got it registered in 1992.

She has worked on collaborative ventures with the likes of tabla maestro Zakir Hussain, Vikku Vinayakram and Mandolin Srinivas. Her recitals abroad include those at the World Malayalee convention, in the United States in 1985 and 1995, in Kuala Lumpur before the King and Queen of Malaysia, numerous cities in the United States, Europe, South East Asia and Australia. Shobana started performing in the Soorya Music & Dance festival organised by Soorya Krishnamoorthy from the year 1994.

In 1994, Shobana founded a school for classical dance Bharatanatyam in Chennai named Kalarpana.

=== Political career ===
Although she has not entered electoral politics, Shobana has actively engaged in political events associated with the Bharatiya Janata Party (BJP). Shobana participated in a BJP Mahila Conference held in Thrissur in January 2024, which was addressed by Prime Minister Narendra Modi. Following the event, she described meeting Modi as a "huge fan moment" and shared photographs from the occasion on social media.

During the 2024 Indian general election, Shobana campaigned for BJP candidate Rajeev Chandrasekhar in the Thiruvananthapuram constituency.

== Personal life ==
She remains unmarried and in 2011, adopted a daughter, becoming a single mother.

== Filmography ==
Key
†	Denotes films that have not yet been released

=== Malayalam ===
List of Malayalam film credits
Year	Title	Role	Notes
1984	April 18	Sobhana	Debut in lead role
1984	Ithiri Poove Chuvannapoove	Subhadra	
1984	Kanamarayathu	Sherly	
1984	Alakadalinakkare	Daisy	
1985	Avidathe Pole Ivideyum	Sujatha	
1985	Ee Thanalil Ithiri Nerum	Soudamini	
1985	Eeran Sandhya	Prabha	
1985	Thammil Thammil	Kavitha	
1985	Anubandham	Vijayalakshmi	
1985	Ee Sabdam Innathe Sabdam	Sharada	
1985	Meenamasathile Sooryan	Revathi	
1985	Ayanam	Alice	
1985	Akkacheyude Kunjuvava	Mridula	
1985	Rangam	Chandrika	
1985	Oru Naal Innoru Naal	Rajani	
1985	Yathra	Thulasi	
1985	Thozhil Allengil Jail	Jalaja	
1985	Vasantha Sena	Merlin	
1985	Upaharam	Maggie Fernandez	
1985	Azhiyatha Bandhangal	Geetha	
1986	Abhayam Thedi	Meera/Miranda	
1986	T. P. Balagopalan M. A.	Anitha	
1986	Aalorungi Arangorungi	Geetha	
1986	Iniyum Kurukshethram	Lekha	
1986	Kunjattakilikal	Usha	
1986	Kshamichu Ennoru Vakku	Indu	
1986	Ente Entethu Mathrem	Ambili	
1986	Chilambu	Ambika	
1986	Aayiram Kannukal	Anu	
1986	Udayam Padinjaru	Renu	
1986	Nyayavidhi	Geetha	
1986	Ee Kaikalil	Viji Balakrishnan	
1986	Padayani	Radha	
1986	Rareeram	Meera	
1987	Ithrayum Kaalam	Savithri	
1987	Vrutham	Nancy	
1987	Kalam Mari Katha Mari	Ummu Kolzu	
1987	Anantaram	Suma, Nalini	
1987	Nadodikattu	Radha	
1987	Naalkavala	Sainabha	
1988	Vicharana	Anitha	
1988	Aparan	Ambili	
1988	Janmandharam	Sridevi	
1988	Oru Vivaada Vishayam	Shobha	
1988	Aryan	Aswathy	
1988	Alila Kuruvikal	Bhavana	
1988	Mukthi	Radhika	
1988	Vellanakalude Nadu	Radha	
1988	Dhwani	Devi	
1989	Naaga Panchami	Panchami	
1989	Charithram	Cicily	
1990	Sasneham	Saraswathi	
1990	Innale	Maya/Gowri	
1990	Kalikkalam	Annie	
1990	Iyer the Great	Amala	
1991	Kankettu	Sujatha	
1991	Adayalam	Malini	
1991	Vasthuhara	Young Bhavani	
1991	Ulladakkam	Annie	
1992	Pappayude Swantham Appoos	Bhama	
1992	Oru Kochu Bhoomikulukkam	Indu	
1993	Maya Mayuram	Bhadra	
1993	Meleparambil Aanveedu	Pavizham	
1993	Golanthara Vartha	Lekha	
1993	Manichitrathazhu	Ganga/Nagavalli	
1994	Pavithram	Meera	
1994	Commissioner	Indu Kurup	
1994	Thenmavin Kombathu	Karthumbi	
1994	Pakshe	Nandini Menon	
1994	Vishnu	Susanna Mathews	
1994	Minnaram	Neena	
1994	Manathe Vellitheru	Merlin	
1995	Mazhayethum Munpe	Uma Maheshwari	
1995	Minnaminuginum Minnukettu	Radhika	
1995	Sindoora Rekha	Arundhathi	
1996	Hitler	Gowri	
1996	Kumkumacheppu	Indu	
1996	Aramana Veedum Anjoorekkarum	Alli	
1996	Rajaputhran	Veni	
1997	Superman	Nithya	
1997	Kaliyoonjal	Gowri	
1997	Kalyana Kacheri	Gopika	
1999	Agni Sakshi	Devaki Manampalli	
2000	Sradha	Suma	
2000	Valliettan	Devi	
2004	Mambazhakkalam	Indira	
2005	Makalkku	Killeri	
2009	Sagar alias Jacky Reloaded	Indu	
2013	Thira	Dr. Rohini Pranab	
2020	Varane Avashyamund	Neena	
2025	Thudarum	Lalitha	

=== Telugu ===
List of Telugu film credits
Year	Title	Role	Notes	Ref.
1982	Bhakta Dhruva Markandeya	Sunithi Devi	Children's film	
1984	Marchandi Mana Chattalu	Uma		
1986	Srimathi Kanuka	Swapna		
1986	Vijrumbhana	Shobha		
1986	Vikram	Radha		
1986	Dagudu Moothalu	Radha		
1986	Asthram	Padmini		
1987	Muddula Manavudu	Hemalatha		
1987	Marana Sasanam	Lalitha		
1987	Ajeyudu	Rekha		
1987	Manavadostunnaadu	Roopa		
1987	Muvva Gopaladu	Krishna veni		
1987	Trimurtulu	Latha		
1988	Rudraveena	Lalita Shiva Jyoti		
1988	Abhinandana	Rani		
1988	Praja Pratinidhi	Bharathi		
1990	Paapa Kosam	Swapna		
1990	Nari Nari Naduma Murari	Shobha		
1990	Kokila	Kokila		
1990	Neti Siddhartha	Jyoti		
1990	Alludugaru	Kalyani		
1991	April 1st Vidudhala	Bhuvaneshwari		
1991	Rowdy Gaari Pellam	Janaki		
1991	Minor Raja	Santhana Lakshmi		
1991	Manchi Roju	Padma		
1991	Rowdy Alludu	Sita		
1991	Alludu Diddina Kapuram	Sita		
1991	Keechu Raallu	Monica		
1992	Ahankari	Shobana		
1992	Asadhyulu	Jyoti		
1992	Champion	Sandhya		
1992	Hello Darling	Bharathi		
1992	Appula Appa Rao	Subba Laxmi		
1992	Surya Chakra			
1992	Gangwar	Pavithra		
1993	Rowdy Gaari Teacher	Malli		
1993	Sivaratri	Gayatrhi		
1993	Naga Jyoti	Naga rani		
1993	Kannayya Kittayya	Saroja		
1993	Nippu Ravva	Guest appearance in a song		
1993	Rendilla Poojari	Radha		
1993	Rakshana	Padma		
1997	Surya Putrulu	Ragini		
2006	Game	Uma		
2024	Kalki 2898 AD	Mariam	Also sung the song "Theme of Shambala"	

=== Tamil ===
List of Tamil film credits
Year	Title	Role	Notes
1980	Mangala Nayagi	Herself	Child artist
1980	Manmatha Ragangal	Herself	Child artist
1984	Enakkul Oruvan	Kalpana	
1985	Marudhani	Marudhani	
1988	Oray Thaai Oray Kulam	Easwari	
1988	Idhu Namma Aalu	Bhanu	
1989	Sattathin Thirappu Vizhaa	Radha	
1989	Paattukku Oru Thalaivan	Shanthi	
1989	Siva	Parvathy	
1989	Ponmana Selvan	Parvathy	
1989	Vaathiyaar Veettu Pillai	Geeta	
1990	Engitta Mothathay	Mallika	
1990	Mallu Vetti Minor	Santhana Lakshmi	
1990	Sathya Vaakku	Meena	
1991	Mahamayi	Mahamayi	
1991	Thalapathi	Subhalakshmi	
1993	Sivarathiri	Gayathri	
1996	Thuraimugam	Rukkumani	
2012	Podaa Podi	Veena	
2014	Kochadaiiyaan	Yaaghavi	
2025	Coolie	Subhalakshmi	Photo appearance

=== Hindi ===
List of Hindi film credits
Year	Title	Role	Notes
1984	Ghar Ek Mandir	Priya	
1998	Swami Vivekananda	Dancer	
2007	Apna Asmaan	Padmini Kumar	
2008	Mere Baap Pehle Aap	Anuradha "Anu" Joshi	
2026	Ramayana: Part 1	Kaikasi	

=== English ===
List of English film credits
Year	Title	Role	Notes
2002	Mitr, My Friend	Lakshmi	Actress Revathy's directorial debut
2003	Dance Like a Man	Ratna Parekh	
2008	A Little Dream	Sundar's mother	Documentary film about the journey of former Indian President A. P. J. Abdul Kalam

=== Kannada ===
List of Kannada film credits
Year	Title	Role	Notes
1985	Giri Baale	Neelaveni	
1990	Shivashankar	Girija	

== Awards and recognitions ==
=== Titles and honours ===
List of titles and honours received by Shobana
Year	Honour	Organisation	Ref.
2000	Grade A Top	Doordarshan	
2006	Padma Shri	Government of India	
2011	Kalaimamani	Tamil Nadu Eyal Isai Nataka Manram, Government of Tamil Nadu	
2012	Arch of Excellence	All India Achievers Conference	
2013	Kalarathna	Kerala Sangeetha Nataka Academy	
2018	Honorary doctorate (D.Litt)	Vinayaka Mission's Research Foundation	
2019	Honorary doctorate (D.Litt)	Dr. MGR Educational and Research Institute	
2022	Honorary doctorate (D.Litt)	Sree Sankaracharya University of Sanskrit	
2025	Padma Bhushan	Government of India	

=== Film awards ===
List of film awards received by Shobana
Year	Award	Category	Film	Result	Ref.
1984	Filmfare Awards South	Best Actress – Malayalam	Kanamarayathu	Nominated	
1985	Filmfare Awards South	Best Actress – Malayalam	Yathra	Nominated	
1986	Filmfare Awards South	Best Actress – Malayalam	Chilambu	Nominated	
1988	Filmfare Awards South	Best Actress - Telugu	Rudraveena	Nominated	
1988	Filmfare Awards South	Best Actress - Tamil	Idhu Namma Aalu	Nominated	
1990	Filmfare Awards South	Best Actress – Malayalam	Innale	Won	
1990	Filmfare Awards South	Best Actress - Telugu	Alludugaru	Nominated	
1991	Filmfare Awards South	Best Actress - Telugu	Rowdy Gaari Pellam	Nominated	
1993	National Film Awards	Best Actress	Manichitrathazhu	Won	
1993	Kerala State Film Awards	Best Actress	Manichitrathazhu	Won	
1993	Kerala Film Critics Association Awards	Best Actress	Manichitrathazhu & Meleparambil Anveedu	Won	
1993	Filmfare Awards South	Best Actress – Malayalam	Manichitrathazhu	Nominated	
1994	Filmfare Awards South	Best Actress – Malayalam	Thenmavin Kombath	Won	
1996	Filmfare Awards South	Best Actress – Malayalam	Kumkumacheppu	Nominated	
1999	Filmfare Awards South	Best Actress – Malayalam	Agnisakshi	Nominated	
1999	Kerala Film Critics Association Awards	Best Actress	Agnisakshi	Won	
2002	National Film Awards	Best Actress	Mitr, My Friend	Won	
2005	Filmfare Awards South	Best Actress – Malayalam	Makalkku	Nominated	
2013	Vanitha Film Awards	Best Actress	Thira	Won	
2013	Filmfare Awards South	Best Actress – Malayalam	Thira	Nominated	
2021	South Indian International Movie Awards	Best Actress - Malayalam	Varane Avashyamund	Won	
2021-2022	Filmfare Awards South	Best Actress - Malayalam	Varane Avashyamund	Nominated	

== Television ==
List of television credits
Year	Title	Channel	Language	Notes
1991	Penn	DD Podhigai	Tamil	Serial
1999	Uravugal	Vijay TV	Tamil	Serial
2010	Jodi Number one season 5	Vijay TV	Tamil	Reality show as Judge
2010	Super Jodi	Surya TV	Malayalam	Reality show as Judge
2015	D 3 (Grand finale)	Mazhavil Manorama	Malayalam	Reality show as Judge
2017	Midukki	Mazhavil Manorama	Malayalam	Reality show as Judge
2021	Margazhi Thingal	YouTube	Tamil	Music Video
2023	Mayamayooram	Zee Keralam	Malayalam	Serials Promo presenter
2023	Subhadram	Zee Keralam	Malayalam	Serials Promo presenter
2023	Seethayanam	Zee Keralam	Malayalam	Serials Promo presenter
