= Kudumba Vishesham =

- Poster
- Directed by: Anil-Babu
- Story by: T. Durairaj
- Based on: Veedu Manaivi Makkal by T. P. Gajendran
- Produced by: Habeeb
- Starring: Thilakan, Kaviyoor Ponnamma
- Cinematography: Ramachandra Babu
- Edited by: P.C. Mohanan
- Music by: Johnson
- Release date: 1994
- Country: India
- Language: Malayalam

Kudumba Vishesham is a 1994 Indian Malayalam film, directed by P. Anil, Babu Narayanan, starring Thilakan and Kaviyoor Ponnamma in the lead roles. This movie is the remake of Tamil movie Veedu Manaivi Makkal (1988).

== Synopsis ==
The film follows Madhavan Nair, an aging taxi driver who works hard to support his large joint family. Living as tenants with his wife Bharathi, he carries most of the family's financial responsibilities while trying to keep peace among his children, siblings, and relatives. Tensions increase when his brother Prasad and his family move into the crowded household, leading to frequent conflicts, growing financial strain, and interference from the landlord.

As the family faces hardship, Madhavan Nair continues to sacrifice his own needs for the sake of his relatives. However, many family members become increasingly concerned with money, property, and their personal interests rather than family unity. Their selfish behavior creates divisions within the household and causes deep disappointment for Madhavan Nair, who feels that his years of dedication and sacrifice are being taken for granted.

The situation reaches a turning point when Bharathi dies unexpectedly. While carrying out her funeral rites, Madhavan Nair reflects on the state of his family and realizes that greed and self-interest have replaced love and gratitude. Disillusioned by the constant betrayal and conflict, he decides to sever ties with his relatives. The film ends with Madhavan Nair walking away from the family he spent his life supporting, seeking peace and dignity apart from the toxic environment that has consumed them.

== Cast ==
- Thilakan as Madhavan Nair
- Kaviyoor Ponnamma as Bharathi
- Maniyanpilla Raju as Prasad
- Renuka as Urmila
- Urvasi as Geetha
- Baiju as Santhosh
- Shanthi Krishna as Aswathy
- Jagadish as Chinna Thampy (Geetha's love interest)
- Ashokan as Uthaman
- Seetha as Deepa Santhosh (Daughter of KRC)
- Kalpana as Elikutty
- Rajan P. Dev as KRC
- Meena as Kikkili Kochamma
- Paravoor Bharathan as Kikkili Kochamma's Husband
- Jose Pallissery as Kunjappan
- Kaduvakulam Antony as Mesthiri
- M. S. Thripunithura as Aswathy's Father
- Harisree Ashokan as Abubacker
- Usha as Vidhya (Prasad's love interest)
- J. Pallassery as Doctor

== Soundtrack ==
The music was done by Johnson and the lyrics were by Bichu Thirumala.

Song title	Singer(s)
"Kollamkottu Thookkam Nernna"	K. J. Yesudas
"Kollamkottu Thookkam Nernna"	P. Susheela
"Kuliru Kumbil"	M. G. Sreekumar, Sindhu Devi
"Niramezhum"	K. J. Yesudas
