= Katha Nayakan =

Kathanayakan
- Directed by: Rajasenan
- Written by: Mani Shornnur; Rajan Kizhakkanela (dialogues)
- Screenplay by: Mani Shornnur
- Produced by: Sasha Alexander Alangy
- Starring: Kalamandalam Kesavan; Jayaram; Divya Unni; Oduvil Unnikrishnan; Mangalamkunnu Karnan
- Cinematography: K. P. Nambyathiri
- Edited by: G. Murali
- Music by: Mohan Sithara
- Release date: 1 August 1997
- Country: India
- Language: Malayalam

Kathanayakan (transl. Protagonist) is a 1997 Indian Malayalam-language family drama film directed by Rajasenan. The film stars Kalamandalam Kesavan, Jayaram, Divya Unni and Oduvil Unnikrishnan. It is reported to have been inspired by the 1994 movie Greedy. The film was a commercial success. It was remade in Telugu as Pandaga.

== Plot ==
Payyarathu Padmanabhan Nair, who is a well known man, is praised by the people. He lives a decent life with his family (Kootukudumbam), his friend Reeve Sankunni and servant, Kuttan. He loves his family more than his life, but they all have eyes on his wealth. On the day of his niece Meenakshi's wedding, he meets a young man Ramanathan. Ramanathan befriends him and Padmanabhan is impressed by Ramanathan's qualities. It is later revealed that Ramanathan is the son of Padmanabhan Nair and Sankunni's younger sister Saudamini. Gradually Ramanathan moves into the family house to stay with his father. There he clashes with his cousin Gopika and she dislikes him as do the other family members. The men of the family sell the kitchen's rice and other goods without Padmanabhan Nair's knowledge. Ramanathan and Sankunni come know about this and try to put an end to this. The family members reveal the truth to Padmanabhan Nair that Ramanathan is Sankunni's nephew and the uncle and nephew are thrown out of the house. Later Padmanabhan Nair questions Sankunni and he reveals the truth of Ramanathan's parentage. Padmanabhan Nair rushes to his son and hugs him. However, he is in a dilemma as he wants to accept his son but can't reveal the truth to the family to save his reputation. The hurt Ramanathan challenges his father to accept him and admit to the truth to their entire family.

Ramanathan and Sankunni return to the family and the whole family wants to know why they have returned. Padmanabhan Nair doesn't answer their questions. Gopika decides to leave the house and stay in hostel. Ramanathan stops her and she insults him. Ramanathan slaps her and she cries and runs off. In the night, Padmanabhan Nair comes to his son who is sleeping and tries to caress him and Gopika notices this.

Ramanathan slowly takes the control of the family and the whole family hates this. Padmanabhan Nair tells Sankunni that he can't reveal Ramanathan's paternity and Sankunni asks Ramanathan to leave. Ramanathan tells him that he wants to protect his father from their greedy family members. Sankunni tells his father that he doesn't want his presence. Ramanathan decides to go but Gopika, who has overheard the truth, stops him, assuring him that she supports him. Ramanathan and Kuttan go to Beerankutty, to whom the family's men sold the goods, and tell him Padmanabhan Nair wants to sell the whole goods of kitchen to him. Believing this, Beerankutty comes to Payyarathu home to see Padmanabhan Nair. The family members see him and are fearful that their misdeeds will be exposed. Beerankutty reveals the truth and Kuttan also admits it. The family apologises and Padmanabhan Nair leaves in anger.

The family wants to celebrate Padmanabhan Nair's 'Sapthathi' (70th birthday) so that he has to hand over his power. Gopika reveals this to Ramanathan. Padmanabhan Nair objects to the family's request but Ramanathan discloses the info in a newspaper. Padmanabhan Nair is angry at him. The villager tell Padmanabhan Nair it's their right to celebrate this with the family and they decide to celebrate. On the celebration day, Ramanathan reminds his father that the latter always encouraged being truthful and now he has to reveal the truth. Padmanabhan Nair reveals the truth about his son to all. Angered, family members beat Ramanathan and demand Padmanabhan Nair for their share in the ancestral property. Padmanabhan Nair willingly accepts their demand. Soon the family members want to know whose name the home is in and thrash the advocate. They receive a phone call saying that the Payyarath family is being raided and manager Krishna Menon reveals that Padmanabhan Nair didn't pay the taxes on the property. The family learns that they will not get any shares. They run and steal everything from the home and leave. Gopika says to Ramanathan that everyone has gone, leaving her alone and Ramanathan holds her hand.

Ramanathan, Gopika and Kuttan search for Padmanabhan Nair and find him at a charitable organisation. Ramanathan and Gopika ask him to return but he asks them if they can give him his past back. Ramanathan says he can't but he can work hard for it. It is revealed that no raid occurred on their house as it was his plan to reveal their family's intentions. He leaves with them to bring Saudamini back as his wife. They reach Ramanathan's home and it is revealed that Saudamini has died. Ramanathan laments that he promised his mother on her deathbed to bring his father to light her pyre. Heartbroken, Padmanabhan Nair lights her pyre. Padmanabhan Nair lives his later days happily with his son Ramanathan, niece Gopika, Sankunni and Kuttan.

== Cast ==
- Jayaram as Ramanathan, as Sankunni Nair's nephew and Padmanabhan Nair's son
- Kalamandalam Kesavan as Payyarathu Padmanabhan Nair
- Divya Unni as Gopika aka Gopu, Padmanabhan Nair's niece
- Oduvil Unnikrishnan as Sankunni Nair, Padmanabhan Nair's best friend and confidant
- Kalabhavan Mani as Kuttan
- K. P. A. C. Lalitha as Kunjulakshmi Amma, the eldest among Padmanabhan Nair's younger sisters
- Cherthala Lalitha as Karthiyani, the third sister of Padmanabhan Nair
- Zeenath as Ammutty, Padmanabhan Nair's youngest sister
- K. T. S. Padannayil as Konthunni Nair, Karthiyani's husband
- Kochu Preman as Vamanan Namboothiri, Ammuty's husband
- Paravoor Ramachandran as Sankarankutty Nair, elder son of Kunjulakshmi Amma.
- Janardanan as Sathrughnan Pillai, Meenakshi's husband
- Indrans as Sreedharan, Padmanabhan Nair's son-in-law
- V. K. Sreeraman as Madhavan Nair, Padmanabhan Nair's son-in-law
- Eliyas Babu as Govindankutty Nair, Padmanabhan Nair's nephew
- Bobby Kottarakkara as Sadasivan Nair, Padmanabhan Nair's son-in-law
- Yavanika Gopalakrishnan as Padmanabhan Nair's nephew
- Bindu Panicker as Meenakshi, Padmanabhan Nair's niece
- Sona Nair as Family member
- Kannur Sreelatha as Family member
- Kalamandalam Geethanandan as Padmanabhan Nair's nephew
- Bindu Ramakrishnan as Family Member
- Girija Kochupreman as Family member
- T. P. Madhavan as Krishna Menon, a manager
- Mamukkoya as Beerankutty, a grocer

== Soundtrack ==
The music was composed by Mohan Sithara.

No.	Song	Singers	Lyrics	Length (m:ss)
1	"Aalmaram"	K. J. Yesudas	Ramesan Nair	04:59
2	"Dhanumaasa Penninu"	K. J. Yesudas	Ramesan Nair	04:55
3	"Good Morning, Good Morning"	Jayaram, Kalabhavan Mani, Indrans, Janardanan, K. P. A. C. Lalitha, Chorus	Ramesan Nair	05:33
