= Mayilpeelikkavu =

- Directed by: Anil-Babu
- Written by: Sab John
- Produced by: Dinesh Panicker
- Starring: Kunchacko Boban; Jomol; Thilakan
- Edited by: Mohan P. C.
- Music by: Berny-Ignatius; Mohan Sithara (BGM)
- Production company: Rohith Films
- Release date: 5 September 1998
- Running time: 165 minutes
- Country: India
- Language: Malayalam

Mayilpeelikkavu (transl. Peacock-feather shrine) is a 1998 Indian Malayalam-language mystery thriller film directed by the Anil-Babu duo and starring Kunchacko Boban and Jomol. This film is about reincarnation and revenge. The movie has many similarities with the 1991 American movie Dead Again. It was one of the first Indian movies to have a website.

== Plot ==
Many years ago, a teenage girl, Kuttimani was brutally murdered, in an orthodox rich Kerala family. Her lover, Krishnanunni was arrested and hanged to death. Years later, Manu, who had an uncanny resemblance to Krishnanunni starts having nightmares about the latter. In Kuttimani's ancestral home, which in the present is supposedly plagued by misfortune and evil spirits, rituals are being held under the guidance of Vallyathan to prevent further mishaps. For ensuring the success of the rituals, Vallyathan requests the presence of all the family. Along with everyone came Gayathri who coincidentally looked very similar to Kuttimani. Once she reaches her ancestors' house, Gayathri too started getting nightmares about Kuttimani. Manu, being an acquaintance of Gayathri's family will have a few encounters with her and later both of them will fall in love with each other. Bad omens start occurring in the house, with Vallyathan being the victim most of the time and he forbids Gayathri from meeting Manu anymore. Vallyathan narrates the tragedy of Kuttimani and cautions Gayathri that she too will face similar consequences if she continues seeing Manu. This scares her and she tries to break up with Manu, but the latter continues to persevere.

Later on, with the help of a relative, Manu meets an old acquaintance of Kuttimani and Krishnanunni and would come to know the truth about the tragedy. Manu now aware of the grave situation rushes to Gayathri only to find her about to be killed by Vallyathan. It is revealed that Kuttimani was killed by Vallyathan himself who, at that time was infatuated by her and couldn't bear her relationship with Krishnanunni. Krishnanunni, being from a poorer household was framed by Vallyathan and his family. With the arrival of Manu and Gayathri, both of them being doppelgangers of Krishnanunni and Kuttimani respectively, Vallyathan sensed he might be in danger and tried to prevent them from reuniting. At the end, Vallyathan gets killed by Rahuleyan, Kuttiman's long lost brother, in the scuffle, and the couple lives happily ever after.

== Cast ==
- Kunchako Boban in a dual role as:
  - Manu
  - Krishnanunni
- Jomol in a dual role as:
  - Gayathri
  - Kuttimani
- Thilakan as Valyathan
  - Vidhu Krishnan as Young Valyathan
- Jagathi Sreekumar as Pappan
- Cochin Haneefa as Gopichetty
- T. P. Madhavan as Thantrippadu
- Narendra Prasad as Rahuleyan
  - Anu Anand As Young Rahuleyan
- Janardhanan as Narayanan Kutty
- Bindu Panicker as Yashodhara Devi
- Ponnamma Babu as Karthu
- Priyanka as Bhavani
- Manjima Mohan
- Sai Kumar as Shankaran
- Maniyanpilla Raju
- Bobby Kottarakkara
- Siddique as Sathyanadhan
- Madhupal as Sreedharan
- Jagannatha Varma
- Master Arun as Priyanka's Son
- Baby Anupama as Priyanka's Daughter
- Baby Malavika Maniyan Pilla as Raju's Daughter
- Master Joyal Maniyapilla as Son
- Baby Ajai as Priyanka's Breast Feeding Baby
- Nikhila Chandran as Nikhila, Priyanka's Eldest Daughter

== Soundtrack ==
The film's soundtrack contains nine songs, all composed by Berny Ignatius, with lyrics by S. Ramesan Nair. The song "Onnanam Kunninmel" was shot in Thiruvananthapuram.

#	Title	Singer(s)
1	"Akale"	K. J. Yesudas
2	"Anjukannanalla [Athalapithala]"	K. S. Chitra
3	"Mayilaay Parannuvaa"	S. Janaki
4	"Mayilaay Parannuvaa [D]"	K. J. Yesudas, K. S. Chitra
5	"Onnaanaam Kunninmel (D)"	K. J. Yesudas, K. S. Chitra
6	"Onnaanaam Kunninmel (F)"	K. S. Chitra
7	"Onnaanaam Kunninmel (M)"	K. J. Yesudas
8	"Paathiraappoo Choodi"	K. J. Yesudas
9	"Paathiraappoo Choodi"	K. S. Chitra

== See also ==
- List of Malayalam horror films
