= Adukkala Rahasyam Angaadi Paattu =

- Directed by: Nissar
- Screenplay by: B. Ravikumar
- Story by: Baburaj
- Starring: Vijayaraghavan; Geetha; Jagathy Sreekumar; Cochin Haneefa
- Cinematography: M. D. Sukumaran
- Edited by: G. Murali
- Music by: Wilson
- Production company: Midas Creations
- Distributed by: Midas Creations
- Release date: 15 October 1997
- Country: India
- Language: Malayalam

Adukkala Rahasyam Angaadi Paattu (transl. Kitchen secret a public affair) is a 1997 Indian Malayalam-language film directed by Nissar. The film stars Vijayaraghavan, Geetha, Jagathy Sreekumar and Cochin Haneefa in the lead roles. The film has musical score by Wilson.

== Cast ==
- Vijayaraghavan as Josekutty
- Geetha as Lilly
- Jagathy Sreekumar as Kaimal
- Ponnamma Babu as Indira Kaimal
- Cochin Haneefa as Dr. Paul
- Kanakalatha as Meena Paul
- Tony as Nixon
- Usha as Jenna
- Nadirsha as Alex
- Sukumari
- Philomina
- Chandni Shaju as Annie
- Baburaj as Adv. Babu Thomas
- Adoor Pankajam as Karimeli
- Machan Varghese as Chandikunju
- Krishna Prasad

== Soundtrack ==
The music was composed by Wilson Skemurak and the lyrics were written by Bichu Thirumala.

No.	Song	Singers	Lyrics	Length (m:ss)
1	"Devi Sukrithaananda"	P. Susheela	Bichu Thirumala	
2	"Kunjiyammakkanju Makkalaane"	K. S. Chithra, Kester, Philomina	Bichu Thirumala	
3	"Malar Mandahaasam"	K. J. Yesudas	Bichu Thirumala	
4	"Malar Mandahaasam"	K. S. Chithra	Bichu Thirumala	
5	"Oru Naaloru Kuttathi"	M. G. Sreekumar	Bichu Thirumala	
6	"Oru Swpanapedakam"	K. J. Yesudas	Bichu Thirumala	
7	"Oru Swpanapedakam"	K. S. Chithra	Bichu Thirumala	
