= Aramana Veedum Anjoorekkarum =

- Directed by: Anil–Babu
- Screenplay by: Rajan Kiriath and Vinu Kiriath
- Produced by: Sibi Vachaparambil Gopikrishnan for Gopura Arts
- Starring: Jayaram; Shobhana; Jagathy Sreekumar; Baiju; Harishree Ashokan; KPAC Lalitha; Kalpana
- Cinematography: Vipin Mohan
- Edited by: P.C.Mohan
- Music by: B. A. Chidambaranath-Rajamani
- Release date: 18 September 1996
- Country: India
- Language: Malayalam

Aramana Veedum Anjoorekkarum is a 1996 Indian Malayalam film, directed by Anil-Babu. The film stars Jayaram, Shobhana, Harishree Ashokan and Jagathy Sreekumar in lead roles. The film had musical score by Rajamani and B. A. Chidambaranath. The film completed 100 days in Ernakulam Saritha Theatre. Music Use Ayyanar Kavil (Version I II).

== Plot ==
The story is set in a land where two brothers are well known for their egos, Kannapan and Rajappan. They were the only sons of the two wives of Phaelwan Phalgunnan Pillai.

== Cast ==
- Jayaram as Kannappan
- Shobhana as Alli
- Harishree Ashokan as Rajappan
- Jagathy Sreekumar as Marthandan Pillai
- K. P. A. C. Lalitha as Kanakam
- Kalpana as Swarnam
- Augustine as Police Inspector
- Baiju as Amminikuttan
- Thalapathy Dinesh as Maarimuthu
- Paravoor Bharathan as Phaelwan Phalgunan Pillai(Kannappan and Rajappan's father)
- Bobby Kottarakkara as Muniyandi
- Kottayam Nazeer as Satheeshan, Kannappan and Rajappan's friend
- Philomina as Bhanumathiamma (Rajappan's mother)
- Sukumari as Gomathiamma(Kannappan's mother)
- Jose Pellissery as Kuruppu, member of Panchayathu
- Kalabahavan Shaju as Kannappan and Rajappan's friend
- K. R. Vatsala as Alli's mother (Cameo)
