= Street (film) =

- Directed by: Anil—Babu
- Written by: Kaloor Dennis
- Screenplay by: Kaloor Dennis
- Produced by: Koshi
- Starring: Babu Antony; Geetha; Vikram; Bheeman Raghu
- Cinematography: Sanjeev Shankar
- Edited by: P. C. Mohanan
- Music by: Tomin Thachankari
- Production company: MP Productions
- Distributed by: MP Productions
- Release date: 13 January 1995
- Running time: 124 minutes
- Country: India
- Language: Malayalam

Street is a 1995 Indian Malayalam-language film directed by Anil—Babu and produced by Koshi and Palamuttam Majeed. The film stars Babu Antony, Geetha, Vikram and Bheeman Raghu. The film has musical score by Tomin Thachankari.

== Cast ==
- Babu Antony as Guruji a.k.a. Roy Cherian
- Geetha as Professor Vijayalakshmi
- Vikram as Sajeev
- Baiju as Vinod
- Rasheed Ummer as Ajay, Sajeev's friend
- Shammi Thilakan as Sudhi
- Anju as Anitha
- Bheeman Raghu as Prathapan Muthalali, Sajeev's uncle
- Prem Kumar as Pradeep
- Riza Bava as Joseph CI, police officer
- Indrans as Usman
- Kozhikode Narayanan Nair as Gopalan, Vijayalakshmi's father
- N. F. Varghese as Advocate Zachariah Varghese
- Abusalim as Anil, Goonda
- Baburaj as Hafeez, Goonda

== Soundtrack ==
The music was composed by Tomin Thachankari.

| No. | Song | Singers | Lyrics | Length (m:ss) |
| 1 | "Anchalum Nammal" | Mano, Biju, Siva | Chittoor Gopi |
| 2 | "Mozhiyil Kilimozhi" | K. J. Yesudas | Chittoor Gopi |
| 3 | "Streettil Tharikidathom" | Suresh Peters, Shahul Hameed | Chittoor Gopi |
| 4 | "Thaaraatti Njan" | Sujatha Mohan, Sangeetha (New) | Chittoor Gopi |
