= Njan Salperu Ramankutty =

2004 Malayalam movie

- Directed by: Anil Babu
- Screenplay by: Kalavoor Ravikumar
- Produced by: B. Rakesh
- Starring: Jayaram; Gayatri Jayaraman; Jagathy Sreekumar; Lalu Alex; Maniyanpilla Raju
- Cinematography: Shaji Kumar
- Edited by: P.C Mohanan
- Music by: Raveendran
- Distributed by: Universal Cinema
- Release date: 19 March 2004
- Country: India
- Language: Malayalam

Njan Salperu Ramankutty is a 2004 Indian Malayalam language Comedy film directed by Anil Babu and starring Jayaram, Gayatri Jayaraman, Jagathy Sreekumar, Lalu Alex and Maniyanpilla Raju.

== Plot ==
Ramankutty, a teacher in the village school is known as "salperu" (i.e. good reputation). Ramankutty's uncles- Narayanan, Madhavan, Velayudhan and Shankaran are in a competition to get Ramankutty to marry their respective daughters. Ramankutty agrees to marry his uncle Velayudhan's daughter. Madhavan's daughter Sangeetha arrives from Mumbai and seeing her, Ramankutty changes his mind. On the eve of the marriage Ramankutty's reputation is shattered. Life becomes hell.

== Cast ==
- Jayaram as Ramankutty
- Gayatri Jayaraman as Sangeetha
- Jagathy Sreekumar as Madhavan
- Lalu Alex as Velayudhan
- Maniyanpilla Raju as Shankaran
- Janardhanan as Narayanan
- Kaviyoor Ponnamma as Devaki, Ramankutty's Mother
- Karthika
- Urmila Unni
- Suja Karthika as Ramankutty's sister
- Boban Alummoodan
- Nirosha as Dakshayani
- Paravoor Bharathan as Kunjambu
- Kottayam Nazir as Himself
- Mala Aravindan as Qadir
- Thesni Khan as Ramankutty's younger sister
- Binda

== Soundtrack ==
The soundtrack was composed by Raveendran, with lyrics written by B. R. Prasad.

#	Song	Singer(s)
1	Madana Pathakayil	K. J. Yesudas
2	Kaliyadi Thalir	Biju Narayanan, Jyotsna Radhakrishnan
3	They They (Puzha Paadum)	Madhu Balakrishnan
4	Mandarapoo	Radhika Thilak
5	Madana Pathakayil (D)	K. J. Yesudas, Radhika Thilak
6	Mandarapooventhe	M. G. Sreekumar, Radhika Thilak
