= Kaliyoonjal =

- Promotional Poster
- Directed by: Anil Babu
- Written by: Sathrughnan
- Produced by: Siyad Koker
- Starring: Mammootty; Dileep; Shalini; Shobana
- Cinematography: Vipin Mohan
- Edited by: P. C. Mohanan
- Music by: Ilaiyaraaja
- Release date: 12 September 1997
- Country: India
- Language: Malayalam

Kaliyoonjalu is a 1997 Malayalam psychological drama film directed by Anil Babu starring Mammootty, Dileep, Shobana, and Shalini. It was written by Shathrugnan based on a story by Sudhakar Mangalodayam and produced by Siyad Koker under the banner of Koker Films and was a commercial success. The film completed 50 days in Mymoon theatre, Eranakulam.

== Plot ==
After the death of their parents, Nandagopal raises his sister, Ammu, who is suffering from epilepsy. She is a pampered child. Nandan agrees to marry Gouri on the condition that her brother Venu marries Ammu. The fact that Ammu has epilepsy is revealed only after Nandan and Gouri get married. Venu, who is in love with another girl, Radha, agrees to marry Ammu to save his sister's relationship. Nandan still remains concerned about his sister who is now living with Venu in his house. This disturbs a self-respecting Venu a lot and arguments ensue one after the other. A party is set on the day of Ammu's birthday both by Nandan (at his house) and by Venu (for his friends). Ammu refuses to wear the saree bought by her husband and wears the saree bought by Nandan. He leaves the place in a fury but later comes back knowing about Ammu's pregnancy. Everyone concerned about her health asks her to terminate the pregnancy, to which Ammu does not agree. Later, they have a baby. On another occasion, Venu feeling humiliated, leaves furiously on a motorcycle. Nandan goes to convince him, but Venu meets his death in a tragic accident. This infuriates even Ammu, let alone Venu's sister Gouri. Ammu, with her child, goes missing. Later, they find her at Rameshwaram where she is performing her husband's last rituals. Leaving the child with Nandan and Gouri, Ammu dies by suicide.

== Cast ==
- Mammootty as Nandagopalan, Ammu's brother and Gauri's husband
- Dileep as Venugopalan, Gauri's brother and Ammu's husband
- Shobana as Gauri Nandagopalan, Nandan's wife and Venu's sister
- Shalini as Ammu Venugopalan (voice dubbed by Ambili), Nandan's sister and Venu's wife
  - Manjima Mohan as Younger Ammu
- Karamana Janardanan Nair as Raghavan Maashu
- Oduvil Unnikrishnan
- Lakshmi
- Praveena as Radha, Venu's ex love interest
- Mala Aravindan as Paraman
- Meena Ganesh as Vellachi
- Maria

== Soundtrack ==
All lyrics are written by Kaithapram Damodaran; all music is composed by Ilaiyaraaja.

No.	Title	Artist(s)	Length
1.	"Akkuthikkuthaadaan"	K. S. Chitra
2.	"Jaga Vandana"	Ilaiyaraaja
3.	"Kalyaanappallakkil Velippayyan"	Bhavatharini
4.	"Manavaatti"	M. G. Sreekumar
5.	"Manikuttikkurumbulla"	K. J. Yesudas
6.	"Oru Naalum Kelkatha"	K. J. Yesudas
7.	"Shaaradendu Paadi"	K. J. Yesudas, Ilaiyaraaja, Bhavatharini
8.	"Shaaradendu Paadi"	G. Venugopal
9.	"Varna Vrindaavanam" (Female)	Lekha R. Nair
10.	"Varna Vrindaavanam" (Male)	Ilaiyaraaja
