= Valkannadi =

- Directed by: Anil Babu
- Written by: T. A. Razzaq
- Produced by: Santhosh Damodharan
- Starring: Kalabhavan Mani; Geetu Mohandas
- Cinematography: Shaji Kumar
- Edited by: P. C. Mohanan
- Music by: M. Jayachandran (Songs); Johnson (Background Music)
- Distributed by: Calton Release
- Release date: 19 December 2002
- Country: India
- Language: Malayalam

Valkannadi is a 2002 Indian Malayalam language film starring Kalabhavan Mani and Geetu Mohandas in lead roles, while K.P.A.C. Lalitha, in important supporting role.

== Plot ==
Appunni is a blacksmith who had a history of mental health problems in his family, hence he was sent to an ayurvedic asylum. After he returns, his mother and his lover Devu become his strength and support.

In one of his incidents of mental breakdown, Appunni hurt his Father's Younger brother, Raghavan. Raghavan's wife, who is also mother of Devu therefore hates him.

Meanwhile, Thamban, an old friend of Appunni comes to the village and is received well by Appunni. Seeing that he is interested in Devu, Appunni tries to arrange their marriage. But it ends badly, with Devu castigating Thamban.

Appunni enters into a state of madness once again and is chained. He is taken care of by Devu and his mother Kuttiyamma. Thamban comes to the house and tries to rape Devu when Kuttiyamma is absent and Appunni is in a mentally diseased state, but strangles and kills Devu accidentally. He ties the Chain with which Appu is tied up to Devu's neck and escapes. When Kuttiyamma returns, she sees a shocking sight, Appu dragging Devu's corpse with his chain.

Everyone assumes Appu killed Devu and therefore, sends him away to a Mental Hospital. Meanwhile, Thamban tries to rape Kunjuraman's elder daughter unsuccessfully. He threatens her saying that if she reveals this to anyone else her fate will be the same as Devu's. When Appunni comes back, everyone hates him and even his mother Kuttiyamma kicks him out. He goes to the mountain top to die, but gets to know the truth about Devu's death from Kunjuraman's elder daughter. In the final scene, Appunni beheads Thamban in front of the Temple and it starts raining.

== Cast ==
- Kalabhavan Mani as Appunni
- Geetu Mohandas as Devu
- K.P.A.C. Lalitha as Kuttiyamma
- Thilakan as Raghavan
- Anil Murali as Thamban (voiceover by Jayan Cherthala)
- Baburaj as Jayapalan
- Babu Namboothiri as Kunjuraman
- Salim Kumar as Satheeshan
- Mala Aravindan as Unnithiri Vaidyar
- Indrans as Kanaran

== Soundtrack ==
All lyrics are written by S. Ramesan Nair; all music is composed by M. Jayachandran.

Track listing
No.	Title	Artist(s)	Length
1.	"Manikuyile" (Punnagavarali)	K. J. Yesudas, Sujatha Mohan
2.	"Kukku Kukku"	M. Jayachandran, Chinmayi; Backing Vocals by Kavalam Sreekumar
3.	"Amme Amme" (Simhendramadhyamam)	Madhu Balakrishnan
4.	"Annarakanna"	Kalabhavan Mani
5.	"Makale"	P. Jayachandran
6.	"Valkannadi"	M. G. Sreekumar
7.	"Narayaneeyamam"	G. Venugopal
8.	"Manikkuyile (solo)"	Sujatha Mohan
