= Achan Kombathu Amma Varampathu =

Achan Kombath Amma Varambath
- Directed by: Anil Babu
- Screenplay by: J. Pallassery
- Story by: Visu
- Produced by: Saji Thomas
- Starring: Murali; Bharathi Vishnuvardhan; Sukumari; Jagathy Sreekumar
- Cinematography: Sanjeev Shankar
- Edited by: P. C. Mohanan
- Music by: S. P. Venkatesh
- Production company: Jubilant Productions
- Distributed by: Jubilant Productions
- Release date: 13 May 1995
- Country: India
- Language: Malayalam

Achan Kombath Amma Varambath (transl. Father on the branch, mother on the ridge) is a 1995 Indian Malayalam-language film directed by the duo Anil Babu and produced by Saji Thomas. The film stars Murali, Bharathi Vishnuvardhan, Sukumari and Jagathy Sreekumar in the lead roles. The film has musical score by S. P. Venkatesh. The film was a remake of Tamil film Varavu Nalla Uravu.

== Cast ==
The list below contains each actor and their role below.

- Murali as Chandrasekhara Menon
- Bharathi Vishnuvardhan as Parvathi
- Sukumari as Harikrishnan's neighbour
- Jagathy Sreekumar as Surendran Thampi
- Thilakan as Mahendran Thampi
- Ashokan as Harikrishnan
- Kalpana as Swayamprabha
- Baiju as Gopikrishnan
- Bindu Panicker as Syamala
- Chippy as Radhika
- Geetha Vijayan as Maya
- KPAC Sunny as Advocate
- M. S. Thripunithura as Sharady
- Paravoor Bharathan as Maya's father
- Shammi Thilakan as Rajendran Thampi
- Sreenath as Balan
- Renuka as Sumithra
- Master Vishal as Unnikuttan
- Meena Ganesh as Maya's mother

== Soundtrack ==
The music was composed by S. P. Venkatesh and the lyrics were written by Gireesh Puthenchery.

No.	Song	Singers	Lyrics	Length (m:ss)
1	"Anthi Paravakalengo Chekkerunnoo"	K. J. Yesudas	Gireesh Puthenchery	
2	"Peelithirumudiyunde" (Muthumani Thenil)	P. Jayachandran, G. Venugopal, K. S. Chithra, Vani Jairam, Sindhu Premkumar	Gireesh Puthenchery	
3	"Ponnin Muthe"	Chorus, Mano, Swarnalatha	Gireesh Puthenchery	
4	"Raavirulin" (d)	K. J. Yesudas, K. S. Chithra	Gireesh Puthenchery	
5	"Raavirulin" (F)	K. S. Chithra	Gireesh Puthenchery	
6	"Raavirulin" (M)	K. J. Yesudas	Gireesh Puthenchery	
