= List of Malayalam films of 2000 =

The following is a list of Malayalam films released in the year 2000.

== List ==
Title	Director	Cast
Millennium Stars	Jayaraj	Jayaram, Suresh Gopi, Biju Menon, Abhirami
Arayannangalude Veedu	A. K. Lohithadas	Mammootty, Lakshmi Gopalaswami
Narasimham	Shaji Kailas	Mohanlal, Aiswarya, Thilakan
Nadan Pennum Natupramaniyum	Rajasenan	Jayaram, Samyuktha Varma
Mera Naam Joker	Nissar	Nadirsha, Shaju Sreedhar, Salim Kumar
Snehapoorvam Anna	Sangeeth Sivan	Vaibhavi Merchant, Innocent, Kukku Surendran
Sathyam Sivam Sundaram	Rafi Mecartin	Kunchacko Boban, Aswathy Menon, Jagadheesh
The Warrant	Pappan Payattuvila	Jagadheesh, Napoleon, Vineetha
Kinnara Thumbikal	R. J. Prasad	Shakeela, Vipin Roy
Mark Antony	Suresh Babu	Suresh Gopi, Divya Unni
Ee Mazha Then Mazha	K. K. Haridas	Sudheesh, Kanaka, Thilakan
Priyam	Sanal	Kunchacko Boban, Shruthi Raj, Deepa Nair
Pilots	Rajeev Anchal	Suresh Gopi, Sreenivasan, Praveena
Karunam	Jayaraj	Vavachan, Eliyamma, Biju Menon
Ayyappantamma Neyyappam Chuttu	Mathew Paul	Siddique, Antara Mali, Master Paul
Life Is Beautiful	Fazil	Mohanlal, Samyuktha Varma, Geethu Mohandas, Arun
The Gang	J. Villiams	Vani Viswanath, Jagadeesh
Daivathinte Makan	Vinayan	Jayaram, Pooja Batra, Prema
Ingane Oru Nilapakshi	Anil Babu	Kunchako Boban, Sneha, Sangeetha, Srividya, Sujitha, Thilakan
Kochu Kochu Santhoshangal	Sathyan Anthikkad	Jayaram, Lakshmi Gopalaswami, Kalidaas
Mr. Butler	Sasishankar	Dileep, Innocent, Ruchita
Manassil Oru Manjuthulli	Jaykumar Nair	Krishna Kumar, Praveena
Indriyam	George Kithu	Vani Viswanath, Vikram, Boban Alummoodan, Nishant Sagar
Mankolangal	Subrahmanian Santakumar	Beena Antony, Seema G. Nair
Ival Draupadi	T Rajan	Vani Viswanath, Sujitha, Kozhikode Narayanan Nair
Sradha	I. V. Sasi	Mohanlal, Arun Pandian, Abhirami, Sangeetha, Shobana, Indraja
Sahayathrikakku Snehapoorvam	M. Sankar	Kunchacko Boban, Kavya Madhavan
Dreams	Shajoon Karyal	Suresh Gopi, Meena, Rahman
Mazha	Lenin Rajendran	Biju Menon, Samyuktha Varma, Lal
Varnakkazhchakal	Sundardas	Dileep, Haripriya, Poornima Mohan
Cover Story	G. S. Vijayan	Suresh Gopi, Tabu
Madhuranombarakattu	Kamal	Biju Menon, Samyuktha Varma, Kavya Madhavan
Sathyameva Jayathe	Viji Thampi	Suresh Gopi, Aiswarya, Siddique
Vinayapoorvam Vidhyaadharan	K. B. Madhu	Jagathy Sreekumar, Sukanya
Rapid Action Force	Salim Bava	Vani Viswanath, Baburaj
Valliettan	Shaji Kailas	Mammootty, Shobhana
Swayamvara Panthal	Harikumar	Jayaram, Samyuktha Varma
Sayahnam	R. Sarath	O. Madhavan, Gomathi Mahadevan, Jomol
Oru Cheru Punchiri	M. T. Vasudevan Nair	Oduvil Unnikrishnan, Nirmala Sreenivasan
Punaradhivasam	V. K. Prakash	Manoj K Jayan, Nandita Das
Joker	Lohithadas	Dileep, Manya, Nishant Sagar
Aanamuttathe Aangalamar	Anil Medayil	Jagadheesh, Jagathy Sreekumar, Maathu
Susanna	T. V. Chandran	Vani Viswanath, Bharath Gopi
Darling Darling	Rajasenan	Dileep, Vineeth, Kavya Madhavan
Unnimaya	Jayan Pothuval	Maria, Salim Kumar, Jagannatha Varma
Devadoothan	Sibi Malayil	Mohanlal, Jaya Prada
Santham	Jayaraj	KPAC Lalitha, Seema Biswas, I. M. Vijayan, M G Sasi
Thenkasipattanam	Rafi Mecartin	Suresh Gopi, Lal, Dileep, Samyuktha Varma, Geethu Mohandas, Kavya Madhavan
Dada Sahib	Vinayan	Mammootty, Athira, Murali
Melevaryathe Malakhakkuttikal	Thulasidas	Balachandra Menon, Abhirami, Geetha, Jomol

== Dubbed films ==
Titles	Screenplay	Music	Cast
Monisha Ente Monalisa	T Rajendar		
Ithu Kadhayalla			
