= Kaviyoor Renuka =

Malayalam film actress

- കവിയൂർ രേണുക
- Died: 2 August 2004
- Occupation: Actress
- Years active: 1979–2004
- Relatives: Kaviyoor Ponnamma (sister)

Kaviyoor Renuka was a Malayalam film and television actress, best known for being the sister of veteran actress Kaviyoor Ponnamma.

== Career ==
She started her career at 1979 with the film Thuramukham directed by Jeassy, and acted in a number of Malayalam films and TV serials. Some of her notable film credits include Sammanam, in which she played Subhadramma. She also appeared in American Ammayi as the mother of Sridevi.

== Personal life and death ==
Renuka died on 2 August 2004, reportedly from pneumonia. She had a daughter named Nidhi, whom Ponnamma helped raise.

== Filmography ==
Renukha acted around 24 films in her career

Year	Film	Role	Director
1979	Thuramukham		Jeassy
1980	Ivar		I. V. Shashi
1980	Palattu Kunjikannan	Peeli	Boban Kunchacko
1986	Vishwasichalum Illenkilum		Allapy Ashraf
1997	Lelam	Kochutresha	Joshiy
1997	Suvarna Simhasanam	Savithri	P. G. Viswambharan
1997	Sammanam	Subhadramma	Sundar Das
1998	Manthrikumaran	Janaki	Thulasidas
1998	American Ammayi	Mother of Sridevi	G. K. Gauthaman
1998	Harthaal	Paappachan's wife	Kallayam Krishnadas
1999	Pallaavoor Devanarayanan		V. M. Vinu
1999	Rishivamsham	Indu's mother	Rajeev Anchal
1999	Jananayakan	Raj Mohan's mother	Nissar
1999	Vaazhunnor	Chechi / Sister	Joshiy
1999	Deepasthambham Mahascharyam	Madhavi	K. B. Madhu
1999	Kannezhuthi Pottum Thottu	Sarojini Amma	T. K. Rajeev Kumar
2000	Sahayathrikakku Snehapoorvam	Saji's mother	M. Shankar
2000	Ayyappantamma Neyyappam Chuttu	Nun	Mathew Paul
2000	Dreams	Ammachi	Shajoon Kariyal
2001	Nariman	Ramani	K. Madhu
2001	Ee Naadu Innale Vare	Savithriyamma	
2001	Nalacharitham Naalam Divasam	Narayani	Mohankrishnan
2002	Jagathi Jagathish in Town	Devakiyamma	
2003	Sahodaran Sahadevan	Aravindan and Mukundan's mother	Sunil (director)
2003	Thillana Thillana	Saroja Menon	T. S. Saji
2004	Kottaram Vaidyan		
2005	Kalyanakurimanam	Chandramathi	

== TV Serials ==
- Sindoorakkuruvi (1999-2000)
- Oppol
- Angadippaattu

== Dramas ==
- Mudiyanaya Puthran
- Bhagavan Kaalu Maarunnu
- Puthiya Aakasham Puthiya Bhoomi
