= Praja =

2001 Indian film

- Poster
- Directed by: Joshiy
- Written by: Renji Panicker
- Produced by: Joshiy; Renji Panicker
- Starring: Mohanlal; Cochin Haneefa; Biju Menon; Manoj K Jayan; Babu Namboothiri; Aishwarya; NF Varghese; Shammi Thilakan; Vijayaraghavan
- Cinematography: Sanjeev Shankar
- Edited by: K. Sankunny; P. C. Mohanan
- Music by: C. Rajamani (Score); M. G. Radhakrishnan (Songs)
- Production company: Mukyadhara
- Distributed by: Swargachitra
- Release date: 14 December 2001
- Running time: 187 minutes
- Country: India
- Language: Malayalam

Praja (transl. People) is a 2001 Indian Malayalam-language political action thriller film directed by Joshiy and written by Renji Panicker. It was also produced by Joshiy and Panicker. The film stars Mohanlal, Cochin Haneefa, Biju Menon, Manoj K Jayan, NF Varghese, Shammi Thilakan, Vijayaraghavan and Babu Namboothiri. Bollywood actor Anupam Kher appears in a guest role. The film's songs were composed by M. G. Radhakrishnan, while C. Rajamani provided the background score. This movie had a great opening at the box office.

== Plot ==
Ex-underworld don Zakkir Ali Hussein, after giving up violence, is settled peacefully in the suburbs of Kochi. It was under the strong influence of his foster father, Bappu Haji Mustafa, that he left Mumbai. An unsuccessful assassination attempt on Haji Mustafa in Mumbai by Raman Naik, an underworld don ignites old wounds in Zakir. He, despite repeated pleas from Haji Mustafa and Ilanthaloor Rama Varma, a father like figure, sets out to Mumbai along with his trusted lieutenant Hamid Plavilakandi Mather, alias Malayalees.

With the help of his friend Arjun, Zakir kills down Raman Naik and reaches back in Kochi. On his way back, at Kochi, he meets up with Maya Mary Kurien, Asst. Commissioner of Police, who slowly starts developing a crush on him. Later, Zakir is visited by Balaraman, a liquor baron and a former M.P and M.L.A, who warns Zakir of dire consequences if he continues to interfere in the Mumbai crime world. He also attempts to woo Zakir, but the latter refuses to bow down, sending strong warning to Balaraman and his group.

Balaraman, along with Devadevan Nambiar, alias DD, and Arun Naik, the brother of Raman Naik in Mumbai, is planning to finish off Zakir and Haji Mustafa to regain the lost turf in Mumbai. They are supported by the tainted, savage and two-faced Lahayil Vakkachan, Home Minister of Kerala. Joseph Madachery, the D.I.G of police conducts a raid at Haji Mustafa's poor home on behalf of Vakachan, and beats up Rama Varma Thirumulpad brutally, but the sudden arrival of Zakir saves him. Joseph is severely beaten by Zakir in full public presence, which infuriates Balaraman and DD, who try to demoralize Zakir by publishing fabricated stories about his relationship with ACP Maya Kurein and inmates of Haji Mustafa Trust's destitute home.

Then enters SP David Abraham IPS, who is an honest cop and also the close aide and sidekick of Zakir. He goes to meet Lahayil Vakachan who tries to create a truce between Hussein and Balaraman, but fails miserably and gets violently berated and stripped in the presence of a lady M.L.A by Hussein. This leads to a series of problems, including the arrest of Jagannathan (Appu), a close buddy of Zakir, on false narcotic drug charges from Haji Mustafa Trust. Left with no other option, Zakir decides to meet the Chief Minister for Appu's release from unlawful apprehension. Then, Joseph arrests Zakir for providing refuge to Appu and hoarding drugs in the trust's medicine store (a forged charge) - later, Zakir is released.

A well coordinated murder attempt is made on Zakir by professional assassins hired from Bombay, he escapes valiantly - defeating the hitmen. Jagannathan is killed in police custody. Balaraman and DD kills Rama Varma Thirumulpad, which prompts Zakir to take the law in his own hands. At a public gathering - a three day convention organised to commemorate the 50th Anniversary of Vakkachan's political entry - while addressing thousands of party workers, Zakir enters by duping police and exposes the real intentions Lahayil Vakkachan, Balaraman, Devadevan and Joseph to the public. Despite the warnings from police chief commandos and beggings from the victims themselves, Zakir,Arjun, David and Malayalees tie them up and place a bomb in a flower bag. Zakir throws the remote on the ground and due to severe running stampedes, the bomb explodes killing Lahayil Vakkachan, Balaraman, DD and Joseph. Zakir, Arjun, David and Malayalees are proud for finishing their mission.

== Cast ==
- Mohanlal as Zakkir Ali Hussain / Zakkir Bhai
- Cochin Haneefa as Hamid Plaavullakandi Methar / Malayalees, Zakeer's Childhood best friend and right hand
- Biju Menon as Arjun/Achu, Zakeer's Childhood best friend and left hand
- Manoj K. Jayan as SP David Abraham IPS, Zakeer's friend
- Babu Namboothiri as Rama Varma Thirumalpadu / Ramettan
- Aishwarya as ASP Maya Mary Kurien IPS
- N. F. Varghese as Home Minister Lahael Vakkachan, The main antagonist
- Shammi Thilakan as Balaraman Konarak, Second antagonist
- Vijayaraghavan as Devadevan Nambiar (DD), Third antagonist
- Baburaj as DIG Joseph Madacherry IPS,fourth antagonist
- Vijayakumar as Jagannathan alias Appu
- Jagannatha Varma as Mannel Mammachan
- Mahesh Anand as Raman Naik
- Shiva Rindani as Arun Naik
- Suresh Krishna as Journalist Unni Pisharodi
- Irshad as Driver Sundaram
- Subair as CI Somendran / Soman
- Sindhu Shyam as Mehrunissa a.k.a. Parukkutty
- Sukumari as Teacheramma, Appu's Mother
- Sandra Amy as Arjun's Girlfriend
- Ponnamma Babu as Girija
- Jose Pellissery as Priest
- Ravali as Diana
- Nandhu Pothuval as Politician
- Jolly Easow as Kunjumol MLA
- Devan as DGP (Guest Appearance)
- Anupam Kher as Haji Mustafa, zakeer's father (Guest Appearance)
- Susheel Kumar as District Collector
- Abraham Koshy as SI Thankachan
- Yamuna Mahesh as Cicily Madacherry, Joseph's wife
- Raj Premi as Arun Naik's Henchman

== Release ==
The film was released on 14 December 2001 and received mixed reviews from the audiences. The music, direction, cinematography, performances of Mohanlal, Shammi Thailakan and N.F Varghese received praise while screenplay, lengthy dialogues and runtime received criticism.

=== Reception ===
A critic from Sify wrote that "Mohanlal continues to be in the age of rage. Praja written by Renji Panikkar and directed by Joshi is another avial movie". A critic from Screen praised the performances of the cast and crew and added that this "combined with direction by Joshi, (who has many all-time hits to his credit) has resulted in a fast-paced action thriller with box-office potential".

=== Box office ===
The film was an average hit at the box office.

=== Accolades ===
M. G. Sreekumar won Kerala Film Critics Association Award for Best Male Playback Singer for the song Chandanamani.

== Soundtrack ==
Praja

Soundtrack album by M. G. Radhakrishnan
- Released: 20 November 2001
- Genre: Popular music
- Length: 36:08
- Languages: Malayalam, Hindi
- Label: Satyam Audios
- Producer: M. G. Radhakrishnan

M. G. Radhakrishnan chronology
Narasimham (2000)	Praja (2001)	Meghasandesam (2001))

The features songs composed by M. G. Radhakrishnan, and written by Gireesh Puthenchery, M. D. Rajendran, and M. P. Muralidharan. The soundtrack also includes the song "Yeh Zindagi Usi Ki Hai" from the 1953 film Anarkali used in the song Prakasha Gopurangale. The soundtrack album was released by Satyam Audios on 20 November 2001.

Praja
No.	Title	Lyrics	Singer(s)	Length
1.	"Allikalil" (Raga: Hindolam)	M. D. Rajendran	M. G. Sreekumar	5:10
2.	"Chandhanamani" (Raga: Hameer Kalyani)	Gireesh Puthenchery	M. G. Sreekumar	5:28
3.	"Prakasha Gopurangale" (Bit of Yeh Zindagi (Anarkali) used as first stanza)	M. D. Rajendran	M. G. Sreekumar, Sujatha Mohan	5:14
4.	"Aaja"	M. P. Muralidharan	Vasundara Das, Mohanlal	4:33
5.	"Akaleyanenkilum"	M. D. Rajendran	M. G. Sreekumar	5:19
6.	"Allikalil"	M. D. Rajendran	M. G. Sreekumar	5:10
7.	"Prakasha Gopurangale"	M. D. Rajendran	Sujatha Mohan	5:14
