= Shivam (2002 film) =

- DVD cover
- Directed by: Shaji Kailas
- Written by: Ram Gopal Varma (unc.,story); B. Unnikrishnan
- Produced by: Menaka
- Starring: Biju Menon; Nandini; Sai Kumar; Vijayakumar; N. F. Varghese
- Cinematography: Sanjeev Shankar
- Edited by: L. Bhoominathan
- Music by: Rajamani
- Production company: Revathy Kalamandhir
- Distributed by: Rajasree Release; Sagar Release; Sudev Release
- Release date: 27 June 2002
- Country: India
- Language: Malayalam

Shivam is a 2002 Indian Malayalam-language action film directed by Shaji Kailas, written by B. Unnikrishnan and produced by Menaka under the production banner Revathy Kalamandhir. Biju Menon appears in the leading role as Bhadran K. Menon, a tough police officer, who is on a fight against Medayil Devarajan, a smuggler-cum-politician (Sai Kumar). Murali, Nandini, Vijayakumar, Ratheesh, Rajan P. Dev, N. F. Varghese, Baburaj, Subair, T. P. Madhavan and Babu Namboothiri appear in other prominent roles.

The film is a remake of the 1999 Hindi movie, Shool, originally written by veteran filmmaker Ram Gopal Varma. It was based on the true story of man named Shivam Kapoor. As it was produced at a very small budget within a short period, this film was successful in covering the production cost.

== Cast ==
- Biju Menon as CI Bhadran K. Menon
- Sai Kumar as Medayil Devarajan
- Murali as Sudhakaran MP
- Vijayakumar as Constable Rasheed
- Nandini as Dr Gayathri
- Ratheesh as Umman Koshi
- NF Varghese as Constable Sukumaran Nair
- Rajan P. Dev as SI Eapen
- Baburaj as Medayil Ashokan
- Babu Namboothiri as Kumarji
- Subair as Sadanandan
- James as Constable Varghese
- Ambika Nair
- Baby Indu
- Jayashankar
- Jijoy Rajagopal as Francis
- Master Arun
- P. Balachandran as Padmanabhan
- Paravoor Ramachandran as Somarajan
- TP Madhavan as Yashodharan
- Praseetha Menon
- Gopika Anil
- Subhash Nair

== Reception ==
A critic from indiainfo.com wrote, "The film is full of violence and action leaving no room for soft and mild moments".
