= The Kids Are All Right (game show) =

- Genre: Game show
- Presented by: John Barrowman
- Country of origin: United Kingdom
- Original language: English
- No. of series: 1
- No. of episodes: 8

Production
- Production location: BBC Pacific Quay
- Running time: 40 minutes
- Production companies: Initial and BBC Scotland

Original release
- Network: BBC One
- Release: 12 April – 14 June 2008

The Kids Are All Right is a British game show that aired on for BBC One from 12 April to 14 June 2008 and is hosted by John Barrowman.

It shares some similarities with Are You Smarter than a 10 Year Old?, which airs on Sky One. It also shares similarities with Eggheads, in that it centres on ordinary people trying to beat a team of super-intelligent ones. The auditions were held in 2007 with the children asked to come to a studio with their parents; they were asked to answer questions about themselves, and had to answer a questionnaire.

== Gameplay ==
In this game show, a team of four adults (friends, family members, colleagues, etc.) have to answer correctly to any questions and beat a team of seven kids named Super Kids to winning a jackpot prize during various rounds.

In each episode, were played five rounds.

In the first round, named Instant Showdown, the adult team starting with an initial price pot of £5,000 had to compete against the kids to defend their jackpot. Taking turns, each adult had to play a duel with a kid selected randomly by a roulette. For each round, three direct-answer questions were asked and to answer had to buzz where the first that scored two points won the head-to-head. At the end of this phase, if the adults won kept their jackpot intact, while for every duel won by the kids, £1,000 were subtracted from the prize pool.

The subsequent three rounds were variable and changed each week, including one involving two adults so that each of the four would participate in one round. In each of these rounds, the kids' age (the elder if were playing two adults) were converted in thousands of pounds should the adults won the games (£15,000 in the event of victory against a 15-year-old kid, for example).

The games used in these three rounds were:

- Information Overload: In this round, a member of the adult team chosen played against a kid randomly selected by the roulette. At the beginning of the game, were shown a one-minute videoclip and then will be asked questions in 60 seconds on what they have seen and eared. Anyone who answers most questions correctly first on the buzzer won the round.
- Omission Impossible: In this game, were involved a single adult and a kid randomly chosen by the roulette. In this round, were shown in turn any images on the video screen like a photo with a landmark missing, a long word with some letters missing or an equation with a number missing. Within a maximum time, in order to accumulate the prize pool, the adult had to correctly match one of the four images that filled the empty space under the main image.
- Biggest & Best: In this round, a kid selected randomly by the roulette ad an adult, had to buzz and answer correctly to any questions after that were shown any images. At the end of the game, the player had the highest score when the time were up were the winner.
- Double Jeopardy: In this game, played two adults against two kids randomly chosen by the roulette. Each team, had to answer three questions asked by the host with two right options and one wrong. The contestants had to choose the right option one by one, and whoever answers first two questions correctly wins.
- Gridlocked: In this round, two kids selected randomly by the roulette and two adults had to answer correctly to a questions with twelve options displayed. After reveailing a category, there was two answers on the grid relate. The kids gone first, with both having to provide a correct answer without conferring in order to win a point. If either kid provides an incorrect answer, the point for that turn is lost. At the end, after seeing a maximum of three questions for each team, who had the most points winning the round.

Finished the three rounds, the adult team for winning the currently accumulated jackpot, had to play the last game Beat the Kids where starting to the younger kid from the elder of the seven, the four adults had to answer a question choosing the category between two options on the buzzer. In each head-to-head, if the adult won against the kid, the Super Kid were eliminated and the adult played again against the next Super Kid in order of age, instead, if the kid won the duel against the adult, the latter were eliminated and can play again against the next adult.

At the end of the game, if the adults eliminated the kids' team, they won the jackpot, otherwise, they won nothing.

== International versions ==
Country	Name	Host	Network	Air date
(Arab League) Arab world	جيل التحدي; Jeel El Tahadi	Michel Sanan	Dubai TV	2008
Chile	Estos Niños Son Imbatibles	Eva Gómez	Chilevisión	2008
China	The Kids Are All Right 鸡蛋碰石头	Qing Hong	Xiamen Star	2 June 2013
Egypt	جيل التحدي; Geel El Tahadi	Ashraf Abdel Baqi	Al-Hayat TV	2010
India	കുട്ടികളോടാണോ കളി? Kuttikalodano Kali	Poornima Indrajith	Mazhavil Manorama	11 August 2016 – 30 April 2017
Italy	I Magnifici 7	Pino Insegno	Italia 1	2008
Poland	Dzieciaki górą!	Tomasz Kammel (seasons 1–2); Marzena Rogalska (seasons 3–4)	TVP2	12 September 2008 – 17 July 2010
Portugal	Super Miúdos	Sílvia Alberto	RTP 1	28 March 2010 – 1 July 2010
South Africa	The Kids Are All Right	Paul Mnisi	SABC1	23 May 2009 – 15 August 2009
Thailand	The Kids Are All Right เด็กอัจฉริยะท้าประลอง	Pipat Wittayapanyanon	Channel 3	4 October 2015 – 27 March 2016
Vietnam	Trẻ Em Luôn Đúng	Quang Minh (season 1); Anh Vũ (season 2); Khương Ngọc (season 3); Đình Toàn (season 4)	VTV3, VTV6, VTV9, VTC5	17 September 2011 (season 1); 15 April 2013 (season 2); 30 May 2015 (season 3); 10 April 2017 (season 4)
