= Kusruthikaatu =

- Directed by: Suresh Vinu
- Written by: [V. C. Ashok
- Screenplay by: J. Pallassery
- Produced by: Mani C. Kappan
- Starring: Jayaram; Kanaka; Jagathy Sreekumar; Oduvil Unnikrishnan; Chippy; Mani C. Kappan
- Cinematography: Saloo George
- Music by: S. P. Venkatesh (Score); Tomin Thachankary (Songs)
- Release date: 14 February 1995
- Country: India
- Language: Malayalam

Kusruthikaatu (transl. Mischievous wind) is a 1995 Indian Malayalam-language comedy drama film directed by Suresh Vinu and produced by Mani C. Kappan. The film stars Jayaram, Kanaka, Jagathy Sreekumar, Oduvil Unnikrishnan and Chippy in lead roles. The musical score of the film was composed by S. P. Venkatesh while the songs were composed by Tomin J. Thachankery.

== Cast ==
- Jayaram as Nandagopal / Nandu
- Kanaka as Indira Nandagopal / Indu
- Chippy as Ganga Thomas
- Jagathy Sreekumar as Madhavan Kutty
- Innocent as Chandradas, Indira's father
- Oduvil Unnikrishnan as Dr. K. Gopala Menon
- Kanakalatha as Indira's aunt
- Mani C. Kappan as Jeevan, Ganga's brother
- Kundara Johny as Ganga's brother
- V. D. Rajappan as Kariyachan, College lab assistant
- Ragini as Chinnamma Kariyachan, College librarian
- Indrans as Arogya Swami
- Jose Pellissery as Roy Zachariah, College principal
- Saradha Preetha as Reshma
- Sonia as Monica
- Thesni Khan as Riya
- Mini Arun as Treesa
- Philomina as Treesa's mother-in-law
- K. R. Vatsala as Homemaker
- Krishna Prasad
