= Mannar Mathai Speaking =

1995 Indian film by Mani C. Kappan

- VCD cover
- Directed by: Mani C. Kappan
- Written by: Siddique-Lal
- Produced by: Mani C. Kappan
- Starring: Innocent; Mukesh; Sai Kumar; Biju Menon; Vani Viswanath
- Cinematography: Anandakuttan
- Edited by: K. R. Gaurishankar; S. Parivallal
- Music by: S. P. Venkatesh
- Production company: O.K. Productions
- Release date: 6 April 1995
- Country: India
- Language: Malayalam

Mannar Mathai Speaking is a 1995 Indian Malayalam-language comedy thriller film produced and directed by Mani C. Kappan and written by the screenwriter duo Siddique-Lal. The film stars Innocent in the title role, along with Mukesh, Sai Kumar, Biju Menon, Vani Viswanath, Janardhanan, Indrans, Vijayaraghavan, Harisree Ashokan and Cochin Haneefa in the supporting role. It is a sequel to the 1989 film Ramji Rao Speaking, and is followed by Mannar Mathai Speaking 2 (2014). Vani Viswanath made her debut in this film as a leading actress.

The film was a commercial success. It is loosely based on Alfred Hitchcock's 1958 film Vertigo (which was an adaptation of the 1954 novel The Living and the Dead by Boileau-Narcejac). Priyadarshan adapted certain subplots of the film for his Hindi film, Bhagam Bhag (2006), which went on to be remade in Telugu as Brahmanandam Drama Company. Writer Siddique later reused the story and tweaked it for his Tamil film Sadhu Miranda (2008) and Telugu film Maaro (2011).

== Plot ==
Mannar Mathai is now running a theatrical troupe under 'Urvashi Theatres'. The lead actors in this troupe, are his friends Gopalakrishnan and Balakrishnan, who always fight with each other for the leading role. During Urvashi Theatres first stage show, Gopalakrishnan is given the role of a villain and is supposed to slap the heroine Shakunthala, but he slaps her really hard. Shakunthala leaves the troupe accepting her invitation to act in a film.

The drama troupe soon faces trouble without a lead actress. Since Gopalakrishnan created all the trouble, he has to take up the responsibility to find an actress. All his efforts to find a lead actress go in vain. During the course of his search, while he was travelling in a taxi, a girl named "Meera" jumps in front of the car to commit suicide. Gopalakrishnan rescues her and brings her to their camp. When she regains consciousness, they make her the lead actress of the troupe. To get the role of the hero, Gopalakrishnan mocks her as his cousin, and she will only act if they make him the hero. Balakrishnan, however, does not readily believe in this and he brings Gopalakrishnan's mother to the camp to clarify. When the truth was about to come out, Gopalakrishnan tells his mother that he told everyone that she is his cousin because he is in love with her, and she asks him to marry her. With no way out, they marry in front of all.

After the marriage, Meera tries to commit suicide again by jumping into the well. She suffers an electric shock and loses consciousness. They all take her to the doctor where she regains consciousness. She then says that she does not remember anyone from the troupe and she is married to a wealthy businessman called Mahendra Varma. They inform this news to Mahendra Varma, and he takes her to his house. Later she calls Gopalakrishnan and says that she is going to commit suicide, and they all rush to Mahendra Varma's house. By the time they reach, she had lit herself, and they all could only watch her die.

After three months, when the troupe is in Mangalore, Balakrishnan happens to see Meera on the roadside. They are almost assaulted by a group of some locals but they manage to escape. Meera reappears in their house, Mathai believes that she is a ghost and gets scared. She says them that she is not dead and her real name is Stella Fernandez and Meera was the name of Mahendra Varma's real wife who died that day. Stella tells that Meera didn't commit suicide but she was killed by Mahendra Varma and he hired Stella who is a criminal and a robber who operates under many names and in many dress codes to act as Meera and to provide proof that she had suicidal tendencies. She met Mahendra Varma in a jewelry shop where she got caught for stealing. She tried to save Meera but she couldn't. They plan to take revenge against Mahendra Varma and put him behind bars.

Mahendra Varma kidnaps Gopalakrishnan's mother and blackmails Gopalakrishnan to bring Stella to him. In the meantime, Ramji Rao also surfaces. He kidnaps Stella and bargains for money. Now Gopalakrishnan is trapped between the two kidnappers and has to rescue both his mother and Stella. In a hilarious situation, Mathai gets the suitcase of money, drinking alcohol between the fight. Using their clever tactics, Gopalakrishnan and Balakrishnan manage to rescue them both. Garvasees Aashan comes there with his gang to break Gopalakrishnan's leg as revenge for his leg being broken by Gopalakrishnan on the day when Stella jumped into his car. Gopalakrishnan fools him by telling him they are practicing drama and he and his gang fight with Ramji Rao's and Mahendra Varma's gangs. When Garvasees Aashan tries to break Gopalakrishnan's leg during the fight with Gopalakrishnan and Mahendra Varma, he accidentally hits Mahendra Varma and he falls off from the top of the building and everyone thinks he is dead, while his body falls on the truck driven by Ramji Rao, and he drives off.

== Cast ==
- Innocent as Mannar Mathai
- Mukesh as Gopalakrishnan
- Sai Kumar as Balakrishnan
- Vani Viswanath as Meera Varma (Fake)/Stella Fernandez/Laila(Fake)
- Biju Menon as Mahendra Varma
- Vijayaraghavan as Ramji Rao
- Janardhanan as Garvasees Aasan
- Cochin Haneefa as Eldho
- Sukumari as Saraswathy, Gopalakrishnan's mother
- K. P. Ummer as Prathapa Varma, Meera's Father
- Kaviyoor Ponnamma as Meera's Mother
- Geetha Vijayan as Meera Varma (Real)
- Indrans as Driver Ponnappan
- Harisree Ashokan as Sandhyavu
- Prathapachandran as Doctor Unnithan
- Machan Varghese as Eldho's Friend
- Priyanka Anoop as Shakunthala
- Kaduvakulam Antony as Booking Agent
- Kollam Siraj as Booking Agent
- Kuttyedathi Vilasini as Shakunthala's Mother
- Kunjikkuttan Thampuran as Namboothiri
- P.A Latheef as Manthravadi

== Soundtrack ==
The film's soundtrack contains 8 songs, all composed by S. P. Venkatesh, with lyrics by Bichu Thirumala.

#	Title	Singer(s)
1	"Aattirambil"	K. S. Chitra
2	"Aattirambil" (M)	K. J. Yesudas
3	"Machane Va"	Malgudi Subha
4	"Olakkayyil Neeraadi"	K. J. Yesudas, K. S. Chitra
5	"Paal Saranikalil"	K. J. Yesudas, K. S. Chitra, Chorus
6	"Paal Saranikalil" (M)	K. J. Yesudas

== Box office ==
The film became a commercial success.

== See also ==
- Remakes of films by Alfred Hitchcock
