= Mani C. Kappan =

Indian film director

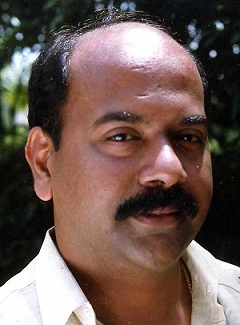

Member of the Kerala Legislative Assembly
- Incumbent
- Assumed office 9 October 2019
- Preceded by: K. M. Mani
- Constituency: Pala

Personal details
- Born: 30 May 1956 (age 70) Pala, Kottayam, State of Travancore–Cochin (present day Kerala), India
- Party: Kerala Democratic Party (2021-Present); Nationalist Congress Party (until 2021)
- Parent: Cherian J. Kappan
- Known for: Meleparambil Aanveedu; CID Unnikrishnan B.A., B.Ed.; Mannar Mathai Speaking

Mani Cherian Kappan (born 1956) is an Indian politician, film producer, film director and actor. He is the current Member of the Legislative Assembly (MLA) of the state of Kerala for the Pala constituency.

Kappan defeated Jose Tom Pulikkunnel of UDF during by-election in September 2019. This seat was vacant after the death of K. M. Mani, former Kerala Finance Minister. He was also the State Treasurer of the Nationalist Congress Party and had been the Convener of its Overseas Cell. He is the current MLA of Pala constituency. He is also a former international volleyball player who played along with the renowned player Jimmy George. He is the producer of Meleparambil Aanveedu, one of the highest grossing Malayalam films of the early 1990s. It made the list of "14 Greatest Malayalam Movies Ever" as compiled by Manorama News. He was also the producer and director of Mannar Mathai Speaking, a popular Malayalam movie. He acted in around 25 movies mainly as antagonists during the 1990s.

Kappan is the incumbent MLA from the Pala constituency. On all the earlier occasions he was defeated by K. M. Mani who had represented the seat from its inception in 1965. He is the son of a former Member of Parliament, Cherian J. Kappan, who was also a freedom fighter. Kappan is also a well-known figure in Malayalam cinema, having produced about ten films and acted in around two dozen films. He even has two films to his credit as a director including a bilingual film in Assamese and Bengali.

== Pala Seat Controversy ==
The brawl over Pala Assembly seat, which began during the by-election last year and was rejuvenated once again with the unexpected entry of the KEC(M) into the LDF, is furious despite denial by the LDF leadership. The NCP's state leadership is also divided over the issue. On 22 February 2021 he formed a new political party named Nationalist Congress Kerala, with Mani C. Kappan as the President and Babu Karthikeyan as the Vice President. His party had won one seat in 2021 Kerala Legislative Assembly election. In the election he defeated KEC(M) Chairman Jose K. Mani by more than 15,000 votes. Jose K. Mani's father K.M. Mani had held the constituency for fifty years.

== Filmography ==
=== Acting ===
- Kusruthikaatu (1995) as Ganga's Elder Brother
- Mangalam Veettil Manaseswari Gupta (1995) as Govindankutty
- Man of the Match (1996) as Abdul Rahman
- Yuvathurki (1996) as J.K.
- The Good Boys (1997)
- Aalibaabayum Aarara Kallanmaarum (1998) as A. T. Alexander
- Friends (1999) as Cyriac
- Mark Antony(2000) as Pankajakshan
- Vaanchinathan (2001) as Mahesh Gupta
- Nagaravadhu (2001) as Thripati
- Vajram (2004)
- Kusruthi (2004)
- Iruvattam Manavaatti (2005) as Bharathan
- Kabadi Kabadi (2008) as Vishwanathan
- Borolar Ghor (2012) as Bankimchandra

=== Producer ===
- Janam (1993)
- Meleparambil Aanveedu (1993)
- Nandhini Oppol (1993)
- Vardhakya Puranam (1993)
- CID Unnikrishnan B.A., B.Ed. (1994)
- Mangalam Veettil Manaseswari Gupta (1995)
- Mannar Mathai Speaking (1995)
- Kusruthikaatu (1995)
- Man of the Match (1996)
- Nagaravadhu (2001)
- Kabadi Kabadi (2008)
- Borolar Ghor (2012)

=== Direction ===
- Mannar Mathai Speaking (1995)
- Borolar Ghor (2012)

== Television career ==
- Dathuputhri (Mazhavil Manorama), Year: 2015
- Chilluivilakku
