= GoBackModi =

Social media movement against Narendra Modi

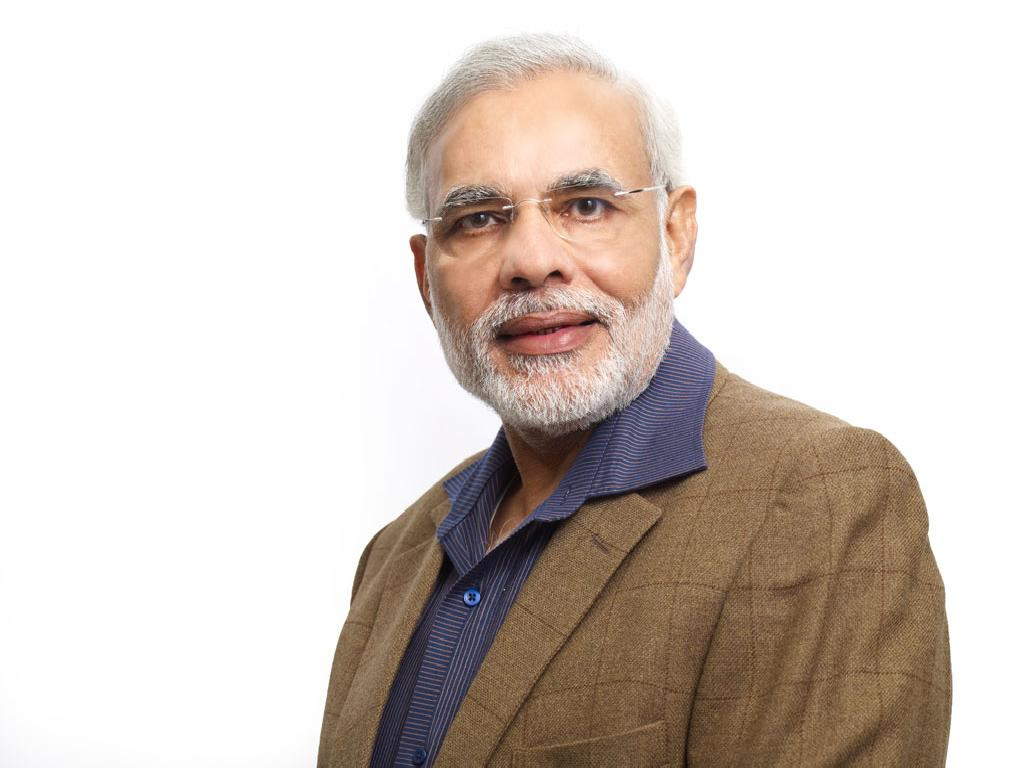
Modi in 2013

#GoBackModi is a hashtag and movement that protests and voices opposition against the Indian prime minister Narendra Modi's visits to various places, primarily throughout India, and sporadically throughout the world. The hashtag first gained popularity on 12 April 2018, when Modi visited Chennai, Tamil Nadu to inaugurate a defence exhibition, and has been especially popular in the state ever since. However, the movement's first instance was a Malayalam language variation of the hashtag named PoMoneModi, and has been adopted since May 2016, when Modi was campaigning for elections in Kerala.

The hashtag has been prominently used by the DMK, the former ruling party in the state of Tamil Nadu, and also by notable people like Meena Kandasamy, Oviya to express dissent against Modi's visits. The movement has also had on the ground protests, in places surrounding the areas that Modi visits.

== Background ==
Narendra Modi was elected as the Prime Minister of India in the 2014 Indian general election. Along the span of his tenure, Modi and his party, the BJP's statements and decisions were increasingly being seen as opposing and neutralizing all dissent towards the party and its conservative ideologies.

== Movements ==
=== India ===
==== Kerala ====
Two years after being elected as the prime minister, Modi visited the state of Kerala in May 2016, to campaign for the BJP in the 2016 Kerala Legislative Assembly election. During a campaign rally, Modi gave a speech in which he compared the infant mortality rate of Kerala to that of Somalia. Kerala is one of the most religiously heterogeneous states in India, and the Kerala model has consistently been praised as one of the most socially developed states.At the time of his remarks, IMR of Kerala was 10 IMR of Gujarat was 30, the average IMR of India was 34 and Somalia had an average of 137.This IMR of 10 is best in India. Consequently, Modi's statement criticising Kerala's social indicators immediately drew strong reactions from all the major political figures, including the Kerala chief minister at the time, Oommen Chandy, who demanded that Modi withdraw his remarks. The BJP won one seat that election. As another consequence of Modi's remark, a social media campaign took off, making use of the hashtag #PoMoneModi, loosely translating to "Go Back Modi". The hashtag is also a reference to the popular punchline "Nee Po Mone Dinesha" from the film Narasimham.

==== Tamil Nadu ====
On 12 April 2018, Modi visited Chennai to inaugurate a defence expo organised by the Defence Exhibition Organisation. The day Modi arrived in Chennai, mass protests erupted, some of which were spearheaded by the DMK president and current Tamil Nadu chief minister, M. K. Stalin. The protests were characterized by black insignia, a colour associated with the Dravidian ideology in the state. Simultaneously, social media campaigns erupted making use of the hashtag #GoBackModi for the first time. The hashtag became the top worldwide trend on Twitter that day, and has been embraced to demonstrate protests every time Modi visits Tamil Nadu, ever since.

==== Other States ====
Apart from being repeatedly embraced by the South Indian states of Kerala and Tamil Nadu, the movement has also seen support in Karnataka, Andhra Pradesh, Punjab, West Bengal, and also the Northeastern states of Arunachal Pradesh, Assam and Tripura among others.

=== Foreign ===
==== Bangladesh ====
Bangladesh's golden jubilee celebration turned chaotic as protests erupted against Indian Prime Minister Narendra Modi, who visited Dhaka on March 26 2021 as the chief guest. At least 10 people died and dozens were injured in anti-Modi demonstrations. The visit, marking Bangladesh's 50th Independence Day, led the government to deploy border security forces nationwide and restrict Facebook and messaging app access to quell mobilization.

Tensions had surfaced a week earlier with rallies in Dhaka opposing Modi's visit, criticizing him for the 2002 Gujarat pogrom and human rights issues in India. Protests turned violent on March 26 after Friday prayers in Dhaka, Brahmanbaria, and Chattogram, resulting in fatalities and injuries. The relationship between Bangladesh and India, historically close since Bangladesh's independence, has strained amid Modi's tenure due to his Hindu nationalist stance and controversial policies.

Sheikh Hasina faces challenges reconciling anti-Modi sentiment, amplified by issues like the National Register of Citizens and Citizenship Amendment Act, seen as discriminatory. Critics, including Dhaka University's Imtiaz Ahmed, deemed Modi's invitation for the golden jubilee inappropriate, citing conflicts over Teesta river water-sharing and border incidents.

Asif Shibgat Bhuiyan, a Bangladeshi blogger, noted protests stemmed from diverse political motivations: religious conservatives opposing Modi's perceived anti-Muslim stance and left-leaning parties rejecting Hindu nationalism's rise in Indian politics .

=== Reactions ===
The primary target of the movement, the BJP, has claimed that the hashtag is inorganic and has been propagated by users from Pakistan in the past. A BJP member also filed a case on Tamil actor Oviya for using the hashtag.

== See also ==
- Public image of Narendra Modi
