= Ithu Engal Neethi =

- Poster
- Directed by: S. A. Chandrasekhar
- Written by: S. A. Chandrasekhar; M. Karunanidhi
- Produced by: S. S. Neelakandan; Shoba Chandrasekhar
- Starring: Ramki; Radhika; Nizhalgal Ravi; Vani Viswanath
- Music by: Ilaiyaraaja
- Production company: Lalithanjali Fine Arts
- Release date: 8 November 1988
- Country: India
- Language: Tamil

Ithu Engal Neethi (transl. This is our justice) is a 1988 Indian Tamil-language vigilante action film, directed by S. A. Chandrasekhar and produced by S. S. Neelakandan and Shoba Chandrasekhar. The film stars Ramki, Radhika, Nizhalgal Ravi and Vani Viswanath. It was released on 8 November 1988.

== Cast ==
- Ramki
- Radhika
- Nizhalgal Ravi
- Vani Viswanath
- Raja
- S. S. Chandran
- Vijay as child artist (uncredited)
- Senthil

== Soundtrack ==
The music was composed by Ilaiyaraaja, with lyrics by Vaali.

Song	Singers	Length
"Neethi Ithu Engal Neethi"	Ilaiyaraaja	4:38
"Padithen Padithen"	Mano, K. S. Chithra	4:40
"Puthisaali Raaja"	Mano, K. S. Chithra	4:30
"Kadaiya Konjam"	Malaysia Vasudevan	4:35
"Chinna Thambi Unnai Nambi"	Mano	4:31
"Unnattam Pillai"	K. S. Chithra	0:59

== Reception ==
The Indian Express compared the film's concept to Shahenshah, saying, "While the Amitabh starrer, despite all its brashness and its haywire climax had some points in its favour, one cannot justifiably clear the local brew". Jayamanmadhan of Kalki criticised the makers for not making the best use of the publicised high budget.
