= Sahayathrikaykku Snehapoorvam =

Sahayathrikakku Snehapoorvam
- Directed by: M. Shankar
- Written by: Sathrughnan
- Starring: Kunchacko Boban; Kavya Madhavan
- Cinematography: Prakash Kutti
- Edited by: P. C. Mohan
- Music by: Mohan Sithara
- Production company: Surya Creations
- Release date: 28 July 2000
- Country: India
- Language: Malayalam

Sahayathrikaykku Snehapoorvam (transl. With love to the fellow female traveller) is a 2000 Indian Malayalam comedy film directed by M. Shankar, who previously directed Nakshatratharattu (1998). It stars Kunchacko Boban and Kavya Madhavan.

== Plot ==
Saji and his friend, Maya Zachariah, are college mates and are jobless after completing their graduation in journalism. They are the happy-go-lucky kind who spend days making merry with their friends. They decide to try their luck in television serial production. Maya writes the script and Saji acts as the hero. Saji's father agrees to invest money in the project as he himself has cherished a dream of becoming an actor. However, Saji's brother opposes the plans.

Saji and his friends` attempts to evade his brother, often leading to some comic situations. As the shoot progresses, Saji faces a severe challenge as he is passing through the most critical facet of his life. His family plunges into a serious financial crisis. A financier files suit against his father for breach of promise which comes as a bolt from the blue for Saji. Now, he is badly in need of a job. Responsibility is born out of necessity, and his brother somehow manages to get a state minister to recommend Saji for an opening as a reporter on a television channel. On the other side, Maya too faces a similar problem. She too comes out as the second claimant for the same post. The events that unfold as both Maya and Saji compete for the same post through various events comprise the rest of the movie.

== Cast ==
- Kunchacko Boban as Sajin a.k.a. Saji
- Kavya Madhavan as Maya
- Innocent as Janardhanan Julius Caesar
- Thesni Khan as hostel warden / Calpurnia
- Jagadish as Vytila Radhakrishnan
- Ambili Devi as Saji's sister
- Maniyanpilla Raju as Mathachayan Saji's elder brother
- N. F. Varghese as Saji's father
- Joemon Joshy
- Devan as Channel GM
- Narendra Prasad as Maya's father
- Kottayam Naseer as Saji's friend
- Saju Kodiyan as Saji's friend
- Joby as Saji's friend
- Monilal as Saji's friend
- Kaviyoor Renuka as Saji's mother
- Yamuna as Maya's elder sister
- Tony as Maya's brother in law
- Laxmi Rattan
- Bindu Varapuzha as Seriel actress
- Gayathri as
- Menaka Mahesh as Maya's mother
- Bindu Panicker as Girija
- Ponnamma Babu as Warden
- Priyanka Anoop as Karthiyayni
- Jose Pellissery as Gopi
- Sudheesh as Robin
- Harisree Martin as Blind Man

== Soundtrack ==
Sahayathrikaykku Snehapoorvam

Soundtrack album by Mohan Sithara
- Released: July 2000
- Recorded: 2000
- Studio: Chetana, Thrissur
- Genre: Feature film soundtrack
- Length: 42:05
- Language: Malayalam
- Label: Satyam Audios

Mohan Sithara chronology
Deepasthambham Mahascharyam (1999)	Sahayathrikaykku Snehapoorvam (2000)	Varnakkazhchakal (2000)

The soundtrack album of the film is composed by Mohan Sithara for the lyrics penned by S. Ramesan Nair.

No.	Title	Singer(s)	Length
1.	"Chellam Chellam"	K. J. Yesudas, K. S. Chithra	05:25
2.	"Alasa Kolasa"	K. J. Yesudas, K. S. Chithra	04:54
3.	"Olive Thaliritto"	K. J. Yesudas	05:25
4.	"Anaadhiyam"	K. S. Chithra	05:30
5.	"Alasa Kolasa"	K. J. Yesudas	04:54
6.	"Pranaya Kavithakal"	Mohan Sithara	05:40
7.	"Anaadhiyam"	K. J. Yesudas	05:30
8.	"Muthuvilakkiloru"	M. G. Sreekumar	04:47
Total length:			42:05

== Reception ==
A critic from indiainfo.com wrote that "Shankar, who earlier directed Kunchacko Boban in the successful film Nakshatrathalatu, attempts a light-hearted love story with him this time around. The subject is interesting and differs from the usual run-of-the-mill plots".
