= Priyam (2000 film) =

- Movie poster
- Directed by: Sanal
- Written by: Sab John
- Produced by: K. K. Nair
- Starring: Kunchacko Boban; Deepa Nair
- Cinematography: Vipin Mohan
- Edited by: A. Sreekar Prasad
- Music by: Berny-Ignatius; M. Jayachandran
- Production company: Smruthi Creations
- Distributed by: Sab Entertainment
- Release date: 2000
- Running time: 144 minutes
- Country: India
- Language: Malayalam

Priyam (transl. Beloved) is a 2000 Indian Malayalam-language romantic comedy film directed by Sanal (in his directorial debut). starring Kunchacko Boban and Deepa Nair with then-kids Arun, Ashwin, and Manjima Mohan in supporting roles. This film is inspired by the Hindi film Hum Hain Rahi Pyar Ke (1993) which itself was based on the 1958 Hollywood movie Houseboat.

== Plot ==
Benny, an orphan, takes care of his sister's three children. Benny's best friend at the orphanage was Annie, who was taken away by her father to abroad. She decides to return to Benny. But fate has other plans.

== Cast ==
- Kunchacko Boban as Benny
- Deepa Nair as Annie Joshua
- Thilakan as Church Priest
- Jagathy Sreekumar as Unni
- Shruthi Raj as Nancy (Avarachan's daughter)
- Devan as Joshua
- Sukumari as Joshua's mother
- Master Arun as Tinu
- Master Ashwin Thampi as Vinu
- Manjima Mohan as Anu
- N. F. Varghese as Avarachan
- Indrans as Shanmugham, Unni's assistant
- Kanakalatha as Sulu, Unni's lover

== Soundtrack ==
The film's soundtrack contains six songs, all composed by Berny Ignatius, with lyrics by S. Ramesan Nair.

| # | Title | Singer(s) |
|---|---|---|
| 1 | "Katturumbinu Kalyanam" | K. J. Yesudas, K. S. Chitra, George Peter, Jyothi Menon |
| 2 | "Kunnimani Kannazhakil" | K. J. Yesudas, K. S. Chitra |
| 3 | "Minnaaminni" | Nayana, Subin Ignatius |
| 5 | "Snehaswaroopanaam" | K. S. Chitra, Baiju Chacko |
| 6 | "Vaikaashi" | K. J. Yesudas |

== Reception ==
A critic from keralatalkies.com wrote that "Beautiful locales, lilting music coupled with picturisation to match, laugh a minute riots and some memorable one liners make the movie worth watching. Everybody involved have put in their might, especially the new find Deepa, displaying a flair for comedy. This movie will light up the faces of your little ones this summer and that is a promise".
