= Ustaad (1999 film) =

- VCD cover
- Directed by: Sibi Malayil
- Written by: Ranjith
- Produced by: Ranjith; Shaji Kailas
- Starring: Mohanlal; Indraja; Divyaa Unni; Vineeth; Sai Kumar
- Cinematography: Anandakuttan
- Edited by: L. Bhoominathan
- Music by: Songs: Vidyasagar; Thej Mervin; Score: C.Rajamani
- Production company: Country Talkies
- Distributed by: Swargachitra
- Release date: 26 March 1999
- Running time: 165 minutes
- Country: India
- Language: Malayalam

Ustaad (transl. Master) is a 1999 Indian Malayalam-language action thriller film directed by Sibi Malayil and written by Ranjith. The film was produced by Ranjith and Shaji Kailas. The plot follows Parameshwaran (Mohanlal), a soft-spoken businessman who leads a double life as an underworld don named Ustaad, he takes care of his younger sister Padmaja (Divyaa Unni), his only family. The film also features Indraja, Narendra Prasad, N. F. Varghese, Rajeev, and Vineeth.

The songs were composed by Vidyasagar and Thej Mervin, while C. Rajamani provided the background score. Ustaad was released on 26 March 1999.

== Plot ==
Ustaad is a powerful crime boss in Mumbai, who decides to stop everything and settle down in his home town with his sister Padmaja. Before he leaves, Ustaad sends Sami and Sethu to Yousuf Shah Associates to withdraw his share. However, Yousuf Shah is not ready to give him a single penny. When Sulaiman, Yousuf's manager, creates a problem, Ustaad uses to take his share of the money by force. In Kozhikode, Ustaad is merely Parameshwaran, an adorable brother and guardian to his younger sister Padmaja. He maintains a low profile as a businessman who has ventured into real estate. Nandan was the one who used to teach Padmaja dance in college. Knowing her likes, and with playful patience, Kshama asks Nandan to demonstrate the dance position along with her, just to tease her. When he does so, Padmaja feels a slight shyness in front of her and becomes completely flustered. Seeing this, Kshama wears a knowingly playful, amused expression. Then Padmaja has completely fallen in love with Nandan, who is the son of Koliyodan Shekharan, a businessman who has not been doing so well, mainly because of the extravagant lifestyle of his older son Koliyodan Giri. Mohan Thampy, Shekharan's son-in-law, is a business tycoon and a politician as well. Originally, Thampy was helped financially by Shekharan, but over time, he was more involved with the underworld, which causes the duo to have a strained relationship. Varsha, a newly appointed city commissioner, does not like Parameshwaran.

Meanwhile, Padmaja wants to marry Nandan, to which Parameshwaran gives his approval. The night before the wedding, Parameshwaran is arrested by Varsha for gold smuggling. He learns that his arrest was set up by Yousuf Shah and Thampy. Varsha later realizes her mistake, and vows to support Parameshwaran. Thampy then devises a plan to vanquish Ustaad, and force Padmaja to vow her properties to help her father-in-law, who has a large debt to Thampy.

As a mediator, Thampy gives some money to Giri and advise him to keep it on Nandan's office room and will inform the police and make Nandan and Padmaja arrest for money laundering. This enrages Ustaad, who finds Thampy is in the protection of a minister. He makes him speak all the truth in front of Varsha. Later Yousuf threatens Ustaad by telling him that he will kill his sister by bomb and breaks his right hand. Ustaad hunts down Yousuf Shah, who flees to Dubai, and finally defeats him in the desert. He flies back to join his sister and family.

== Cast ==
- Mohanlal as Parameswaran/Usthaad
- Divya Unni as Padmaja / Pappa, Parameswaran's Sister
- Indraja as Kshama, Parameswaran's Love Interest
- Rajeev as Yousuf Shah
- Vani Viswanath as City Police Commissioner Varsha Varma IPS
- Janardhanan as Swamy, Ustaad's Friend and Assistant
- Innocent as Kunji Palu, Ustaad's Friend
- Vineeth as Koliyodan Nandan, Padmaja's Love Interest and Husband
- K. B. Ganesh Kumar as Sethu, Ustaad's Friend and Assistant
- Maniyanpilla Raju as Adv. Abraham, Ustaad's Advocate
- Augustine as Aali Abu, Usthad's Assistant and Helper
- Sai Kumar as Koliyodan Giri, Nandan's Brother
- Narendra Prasad as Koliyodan Shekharan, Nandan's Father
- N. F. Varghese as Mohan Thampy, Nandan's Brother-in-Law
- Siddique as Irani, Ustaad's Friend (Cameo Appearance)
- Cochin Haneefa as Union Minister Shivaji Rao / Kuttikrishnan (Cameo Appearance)
- Chithra as Ambika, Mohan Thampy's Wife and Nandan's Sister
- Kunchan as Appootty
- Jomol as Sereena, Yousaf Shah's Sister (Cameo Appearance)
- Sudheesh as Yousaf Shah's Brother-in-Law (Cameo Appearance)
- Srividya as Dr. Malathi Menon, Kshama's Mother
- Sadiq as SP Sunil Menon
- Kozhikode Narayanan Nair as Lambodharan, Kshama's Uncle
- Sindhu as Raji, Giri's Wife
- Santhakumari as Devakiyamma
- Thambi Kannanthanam as Azeez, Yousuf Shah's Friend
- Manka Mahesh as Varsha's Mother
- Sajitha Betti as Kshama's Friend
- Mafia Sasi as Sulaiman, Yousaf Shah's Henchman
- Nizar as Yousuf Shah's Brother
- Yamuna as Parameswaran and Padmaja's Mother
- Abu Salim as Hamsa, Yousaf Shah's Henchman
- Prasanna as dancer (Cameo Appearance)
- Robert as Dancer (Cameo Appearance)
- Sridhar as Dancer (Cameo Appearance)

== Production ==
The song "Theerchayilla Janam" was filmed at the AVM Studio in Chennai, for which a set was constructed resembling a bar. It was choreographed by Kala. The song was sung by Mohanlal and featured himself along with dancers, club members, and the villains.

== Soundtrack ==
Ustaad

Soundtrack album by Vidyasagar
- Released: March 1999
- Studio: Varshaa Vallaki, Chennai
- Genre: Film soundtrack
- Label: Sargam Speed Audios

Vidyasagar chronology
Ethirum Pudhirum (1999)	Ustaad (1999)	Ezhupunna Tharakan (1999)

The songs soundtrack was composed by Vidyasagar and Thej Mervin ("Theerchayilla"). The lyrics were by Gireesh Puthenchery and Kannan Pareekutty ("Theerchayilla").

Track	Song	Singer(s)
1	Introduction	Mohanlal
2	Theerchayilla	Mohanlal
3	Chil Chil Chil Chilamboli	M. G. Sreekumar, Chorus
4	Vennila Kombile	K. J. Yesudas, Sujatha Mohan (humming)
5	Chandramukhi	Srinivas, Radhika Thilak
6	Vennila Kombile	Srinivas, Sujatha Mohan (humming)
7	Naadodi Poonthinkal	M. G. Sreekumar, Sujatha Mohan

== Reception ==
Neenu Abraham of Deccan Herald wrote that "With the exception of Mohan Lal, that classic Malayil touch seems to be missing here. Which is not to say that it is a bad film. It did have its light-hearted moments lent by all-time favourite Innocent. But the next time Malayil decides on producing a film, he better keep to his old style".

Ustaad was successful at the box office. The movie was speculated to be an inspiration for the 2015 Tamil movie Vedalam.
