= Vinayapoorvam Vidhyaadharan =

Vinayapoorvam Vidyaadharan
- Directed by: K. B. Madhu
- Written by: K. B. Madhu
- Screenplay by: P. Suresh Kumar
- Produced by: P. G. Mohan
- Starring: Jagathy Sreekumar; Sukanya; Sukumari; Harisree Ashokan; Rajan P. Dev; Jagadeesh
- Cinematography: M. J. Radhakrishnan
- Edited by: G. Murali
- Music by: Kaithapram
- Production company: Film Folks
- Distributed by: Film Folks
- Release date: 8 September 2000
- Country: India
- Language: Malayalam

Vinayapoorvam Vidyaadharan (Malayalam:വിനയപൂർവ്വം വിദ്യാധരൻ) is a 2000 Indian Malayalam film, directed by K. B. Madhu and produced by P. G. Mohan with executive producer Mohamed Siraj.The film stars Jagathy Sreekumar, Sukanya, Harisree Ashokan, Rajan P. Dev, Salu Kuttanad, Jagadeesh, Sukumari, Indrans and N. F. Varghese in lead roles. The film has musical score by Kaithapram.

== Synopsis ==
Bank manager Vidyadharan, in the pursuit of more money at the behest of his wife, gets cheated and loses his job, and goes incognito, helped by a group of beggars, to pursue the culprits to bring them to book and prove his innocence.

== Cast ==
- Jagathy Sreekumar as Vidhyadharan Nair
- Sukanya as Shalini Nair, Vidhyadharan's wife
- Harisree Ashokan as Punyalan
- Sukumari as Vidhyadharan's mother
- Rajan P. Dev as Hitler
- Salu Kuttanad as Punyalan's right hand
- Aloor Elsy
- Indrans as Peon Kuttappan
- Jagadish as Alex Paul
- Kalabhavan Rahman as security guard
- Kochu Preman as Captain
- Kozhikode Narayanan Nair as Appukuttan Nair, Vidhyadharan's elder brother
- N. F. Varghese as M.S. Nair, Shalini's father
- Ponnamma Babu as Vasantha, Shalini's mother
- Salim Kumar as Astrologer
- Mela Reghu as Hitler's assistant
- Kozhikode Sharada as Kalliyankattu Neeli
- Spadikam George as Mathai Panadan
- Valsala Menon as Sushma Aunty, Wife of the Captain
- Easwaran Nair as Nambuthiri
- Jaganadha Kuruppu as Nambiar
- Madhupal as Ashique
- Nandakishore as Ittooppu
- Irshad as Sales Marketing Executive
- Manju Pillai as Rexy (Alex's wife)

== Soundtrack ==
The music was composed by Kaithapram.

No.	Song	Singers	Lyrics	Length (m:ss)
1	"Enniyaal Theeraatha" (M)	K. J. Yesudas	Kaithapram	
2	"Enniyaal Theeratha" (F)	K. S. Chithra	Kaithapram	
3	"Kaattu Valli"	K. J. Yesudas, Swarnalatha	Kaithapram	
4	"Kaattu Valli Oonjaalaadaam" (M)	K. J. Yesudas	Kaithapram	
5	"Paadanariyilla"	K. S. Chithra	Kaithapram	
6	"Paadanariyilla" (M)	K. J. Yesudas	Kaithapram	
7	"Ponnumkudathinu"	K. J. Yesudas	Kaithapram	
8	"Tholil Maarappu"	K. J. Yesudas	Kaithapram	
