= Kuttikalodano Kali =

- Genre: Game show
- Created by: Endemol
- Presented by: Poornima Indrajith
- Country of origin: India
- No. of seasons: 01

Production
- Producer: Jenson Zachariah
- Running time: 60Minutes approx.
- Production company: MM TV

Original release
- Network: Mazhavil Manorama
- Release: 11 August 2016 – 30 April 2017

Kuttikalodano Kali? (Ml; കുട്ടികളോടാണോ കളി?) is an Indian Malayalam family-oriented kids game show which premiered on Mazhavil Manorama on 11 August 2016. The show is hosted by south-Indian film actress Poornima Indrajith

== Concept & Format ==
Kuttikalodano Kali? is a show where highly intelligent people from different professions (adults) compete against the seven top educated students under-17 through several question asked by the host.

This show is the Indian version of internationally broadcast reality series The Kids Are All Right which was first premiered in the United Kingdom.

The show has aired since 11 August 2016 and went off air on 30 April 2017. It was broadcast every Saturday and Sunday at 8.30 PM (IST).

== Rounds and Format ==
There are 5 rounds in this game show viz. Nerkkuner, kazhchavattom, iruvattaporattam, bhoothakannadi and the final round Kuttikalasham.

== Nerkkuner ==
This is the first round of the game show. In this round all four adults have to compete against the kids. Each participant will receive Rs50,000 each i.e. Rs200,000 total .To retain their money they will have to answer the first two questions correctly on the buzzer. If they fail to do so then their 50,000 will be lost. The maximum amount one can collect in this round is 200,000 and the minimum is 0.

== Kazhchavattam ==
This is the second round of the game. In this round any member of the team can compete against the superkid. The adult will get an amount equivalent to 10000 times of the child's age. They will be shown a 1-minute video clip and questions will be asked on what they have seen. The contestant who answers first on the buzzer will win. The maximum amount one can get in this round is Rs 150,000 and the minimum amount is Rs 100,000.

== Iruvattaporattom ==
This is the third round of the show. In this round 2 members from both the teams can compete against each other. Each team will have to answer 3 questions asked by the host. Each question will have 2 right options and a wrong option. Contestants will have to choose the right option one by one. Here the maximum and minimum amount is same as the second round.

== Bhootha Kannadi ==
This is the fourth and the last round to gain money. In this round, the remaining contestants from both teams will compete against each other. They will have to again answer the questions quickly and correctly on the buzzer from the multiple options given. The amount they can win is the same as the previous rounds.

== Kutti kalasham ==
This is the last round in the game show. The adults will have to protect the money which they have earned in the previous rounds. They will have to defeat the 7 kids to take their money home or they will lose their money.

== The Wonderla Super Kids ==
The kids participating in this show are known as the wonderla super kids. They are selected from the different parts of the state through a rigorous process of tests. Currently there are 26 kids participating in the show. They are

Anugrah -10yrs from Thrissur,

Joeta -10yrs from Kochi,

Navneeth M Kumar - 10 yrs from Kochi

Anshuman Abraham Koshy -11 yrs from Kochi,

Bharath Krishna - 11 yrs from Thrissur,

Madhav R Babu -11yrs from Malappuram,

Sreyas Warrier -11yrs from Alappuzha.

Alfid K Khader (Ippu) -12 yrs from Idukki,

Vrinda S K -12 yrs from Thiruvananthapuram.

Aleena M H- 13yrs from Thiruvananthapuram,

Aparna Prabhakar- 13 yrs from Thiruvananthapuram,

Kalyani Kiran- 13 yrs from Kollam,

Yeldho Shem Mathew - 13 yrs from Kochi,

Sreeram Madhavan - 13 yrs from Thrissur.

Anand Rajagopal (Rajaji) - 14 yrs from Kochi,

Athul - 14 yrs from Kochi,

Philip -14 yrs from Kochi,

Sunfiya -14 yrs from Alappuzha,

Madhavan - 14 yrs from Kottayam,

Navneet Krishnan - 14 yrs from Palakkat,

Nirupam -14 yrs from Kozhikode.

Nandana Sony - 15yrs from Kochi,

Nihal Sha - 15yrs from Kochi,

Raveendranath pai - 15yrs from Kochi,

Sidharth R - 15yrs from Kochi,

Syam - 15yrs from Thrissur.
