= Mangalam Veettil Manaseswari Gupta =

- Directed by: Suresh Vinu
- Written by: Mani C. Kappan; Reghunath Paleri
- Produced by: Mani C. Kappan; Girish Vaikom
- Starring: Jayaram; Vani Viswanath; Narendra Prasad; Cochin Hanifa; Mani C. Kappan
- Cinematography: Anandakuttan
- Edited by: G. Murali
- Music by: Johnson
- Release date: 6 October 1995
- Country: India
- Language: Malayalam

Mangalam Veettil Manaseswari Gupta is a 1995 Malayalam film starring Jayaram and Vani Viswanath. The film has a musical score by Johnson.

== Plot ==
A man tries to find a groom for his granddaughter Maya, who has returned from Mumbai. However, he does not know that she is already married to photographer Jayadevan. In a parallel plot line, a few underworld dons are trying to retrieve diamonds from Maya, which she possesses unknowingly.

== Cast ==
- Jayaram as Jayadevan
- Vani Viswanath as Maya Surendran / Manaseswari Gupta
- Narendra Prasad as Mangalam Veetil Mooppil Nair
- Janardhanan as Achuthankutty, Nair's eldest son
- Innocent as Narayanankutty, Nair's second son
- K.P.A.C. Lalitha as Kamalakshi, Nair's elder daughter
- Jagathy Sreekumar as Sivankutty, Achuthankutti's son
- Mamukkoya as Koya
- Jose Pellissery as Sahadevan, Kamalakshi's husband
- Indrans as Dasan / Paramanada Gupta
- Cochin Haneefa as Kunjayan
- A. C. Zainuddin as Albert
- V. D. Rajappan as Musthafa
- Kanakalatha as Narayanankutty's wife
- K. R. Vatsala as Vishalam, Achuthankutty's wife
- Meena (Malayalam actress) as Annamma
- Mani C. Kappan as Govindankutty
- Bindu Panicker as Vasumathi
- Rizabawa as Sethumadhavan
- Chembu Sajin
- Tony as Vasunni \ Kamalakshi's son
- K. T. S. Padannayil as Carpenter Karappai
- Keerikkadan Jose as Bada Usthad

== Soundtrack ==
The film's soundtrack was composed by Johnson, with lyrics penned by Gireesh Puthenchery and P. K. Mishra. The album features three songs, performed by renowned playback singers Sujatha Mohan, P. Unnikrishnan, K. S. Chithra, and a chorus ensemble.

#	Song	Music	Lyrics	Singers
1	"Kannippenne Penne"	Johnson	Gireesh Puthenchery, P. K. Mishra	Sujatha Mohan, Chorus
2	"Yaamini"	Johnson]	Gireesh Puthenchery, P. K. Mishra	P. Unnikrishnan, K. S. Chithra, Chorus
3	"Chori Mujhe Kya Huva"	Johnson	P. K. Mishra	K. S. Chithra, Chorus
