= The Good Boys =

- Directed by: K. P. Sunil
- Written by: K. P. Sunil
- Screenplay by: Rafeeq Seelat
- Produced by: Ali
- Starring: Jagathy Sreekumar; Mani C. Kappan; Deepanjali; Harishree Ashokan
- Cinematography: Rasheed Mooppan
- Edited by: G. Murali
- Music by: Bappi Lahiri
- Production company: Mac Productions
- Distributed by: Mac Productions
- Release date: 1997
- Country: India
- Language: Malayalam

The Good Boys is a 1997 Indian Malayalam film, directed by K. P. Sunil and produced by Ali. The film stars Jagathy Sreekumar, Mani C. Kappan, Deepanjali and Harishree Ashokan in the lead roles. The film has musical score by Bappi Lahiri.

== Plot ==
Sudhi, Unni, Suseelan, and Gopalakrishnan are happy go-lucky unemployed youths yearning to escape from their families. While their mothers Rajeswari, Gomathi Teacher and Sreelatha are more or less accomplished and empowered housewives devoted to their families, the fathers Mohanachandran, Vikraman Nair, and Kuruppu are promiscuous middle aged men who outwardly pretend to be loyal and dutiful to their wives but secretly yearn to vent their sexual frustrations. A mishap surrounding the young sons' attempt to accost a prostitute ends up in the fathers getting beaten by misunderstood villagers the next day, and an astrologer called in by the wives prescribes penance in a Madurai temple. As the fathers elude citing health reasons, the four young men are entrusted to carry out the penance at Madurai. They set out pretending to do so and have a blast after leaving home. However, they meet a beautiful girl under suspicious circumstances. Initially fantasising her to be a prostitute, they take her to Kodaikanal and lodge in a hotel. When she bites their noses off, they realise that she is mentally unstable. After a series of unsuccessful attempts at wooing her ending in her disappearance and suspected death, they run for their lives and return home.

However, we are shown that the girl is not dead, and she arrives in town right in time to get trapped in the same van, now driven by Mohanachandran. The three promiscuous fathers encounter her and take an immediate sexual attraction towards her despite them actually having daughters of the same age. She who goes by the name Rangeela with the boys and Saleena with their fathers happen to be in fact Maya Varma, daughter of Prathapa Varma.

== Cast ==
- Kalabhavan Mani as Gopalakrishnan
- Sudheesh as Sudhi
- Nadirshah as Unni
- Edavela Babu as Suseelan
- Deepanjali as Maya/Rangeela/Saleena
- Madhu as Prathapa Varma
- Jagathy Sreekumar as Vikraman Nair
- Janardanan as Mohanachandran
- Jose Pellissery as Kuruppu
- Harishree Ashokan as Kunjandi
- Bindu Panicker as Rajeswari
- Zeenath as Gomathi Teacher
- Kannur Sreelatha as Wife of Kuruppu
- Vani Viswanath as Cameo
- Mani C. Kappan
- C V Dev as Astrologer

== Soundtrack ==
The music was composed by Bappi Lahiri.

No.	Song	Singers	Lyrics	Length (m:ss)
1	"Aathire Neeyallatharundenne"	M. G. Sreekumar	Gireesh Puthenchery	
2	"Maarivillo Malarnilaavo"	M. G. Sreekumar	Gireesh Puthenchery	
3	"Pakal Maayum Mukil Maanam"	K. S. Chithra	Gireesh Puthenchery	
4	"Ven Praave"	Mano	Gireesh Puthenchery	
5	"Ven Praave"	Biju Narayanan	Gireesh Puthenchery	
