= Meleparambil Anveedu =

- Poster
- Directed by: Rajasenan
- Screenplay by: Raghunath Paleri
- Story by: Gireesh Puthenchery
- Produced by: Mani C. Kappan
- Starring: Jayaram; Shobana
- Narrated by: Narendra Prasad
- Cinematography: Anandakuttan
- Edited by: G. Murali
- Music by: Johnson
- Production company: Okay Productions
- Distributed by: Okay Release
- Release date: October 14, 1993
- Running time: 160 minutes
- Country: India
- Language: Malayalam

Meleparambil Anveedu (transl. Men’s House of Meleparambu) is a 1993 Indian Malayalam-language romantic comedy-drama film directed by Rajasenan and scripted by Raghunath Paleri from a story by Gireesh Puthenchery. It stars Jayaram and Shobana, with Narendra Prasad, Meena Joseph, Jagathy Sreekumar, Janardanan, Vijayaraghavan, Oduvil Unnikrishnan, and Vinu Chakravarthy in supporting roles. The film was produced and distributed by Mani C. Kappan. This film is considered one of the best comedy movies in Malayalam cinema and has a cult status. It was remade in Tamil twice, as Valli Vara Pora (1995) and Naiyaandi (2013). Kappan remade the film in Assamese as Borolar Ghor (2012).

== Plot ==
Harikrishan is the youngest son of Thiruvikraman Muthallali. His brothers Jayakrishnan and Gopikrishan are uneducated and unmarried. Hari wants to earn a good living and sets forth to a Tamil village as a courier company's manager. He sees a young Tamil woman named Pavizham who is the daughter of a landlord, Pollachi Gounder. The landlord initially is fond of Harikrishnan, but Pavizham's cousin, Marimuthu, hates him. Pavizham and Hari get to know one another, and the two fall in love. However, her father desires another groom and potentially Marimuthu. When her father forces her to marry against her will, Hari and Pavizham elope. They are caught and presented before the naattukoottam (panchayat) presided over by Pavizham's father, since he is considered the "nattamai" of the village. Finally, out of his love for his daughter, Gounder issues a "theerpu" and presents a thaali (wedding knot) for Hari to tie around Pavizham's neck as a finalization of marriage between the two.

Hari is scared whether his parents will accept their marriage. Hence, he keeps Pavizham undercover as a maid in his home. When Hari goes away on business, his parents realize that Pavizham is pregnant and decide to dismiss her from her job. When Hari returns home, he is forced to reveal that Pavizham is his wife. Hari's mother, who likes Pavizham, scolds Hari for keeping his wife as a servant. She and her husband express their willingness to accept Pavizham as their daughter-in-law.

== Cast ==
- Jayaram as Harikrishnan
- Shobana as Pavizham, Harikrishnan's love interest and wife
- Narendra Prasad as Thrivikraman Muthalali, Harikrishnan's father
- Meena as Bhanumathi, Harikrishnan's mother
- Jagathy Sreekumar as Jayakrishnan, Harikrishnan's eldest brother
- Vijayaraghavan as Gopikrishnan, Harikrishnan's elder brother
- Janardhanan as Kannappan, Harikrishnan's uncle
- Paravoor Bharathan as Paramasivan, Thrivikraman's Helper
- Oduvil Unnikrishnan as Kuttan Nair, Tea Shop Owner
- Vinu Chakravarthy as Veeramuthu Gounder, Pavizham's father
- Vijayachandrika as Veeramuthu Gounder's wife, Pavizham's mother
- Indrans as Aadithyan, Marriage Broker
- Priyanka Anoop as Chenthamara, Kuttan Nair's daughter
- Rani Larius as Pazhutha Thakkali
- Savitha as Pacha Thakkali
- Crane Manohar as a lorry driver
- V. D. Rajappan as Swami, Area Manager
- James as Anil, Pavizham's fake brother and Harikrishnan's helper
- Uzhavoor Vijayan as Agriculture Department Officer
- Ram Lakshman (climax fight scene)

== Production ==
=== Development ===
After the success of Jayaram and Rajasenan Ayalathe Adyeham (1992), they planned to do another family entertainer. Lyricist Gireesh Puthenchery told Jayaram a story about four bachelors with the youngest, the only one educated, in a Corleone-like family. Jayaram, who was highly inspired by this story, decided to produce it himself. The thread was developed by Puthenchery and introduced to Rajasenan. It was first developed into a novel and then into a complete movie script. Jayaram suggested Goodknight Mohan distribute it. However, Mohan set an unusual demand on Rajasenan, to include some experienced directors to supervise him on script. This was unacceptable to Rajasenan and the project was shelved. At this time, Rajasenan was displaced from the crew of a political film, Janam, produced by Mani. C. Kappan. Kappan assured Rajasenan to produce a film for him, as compensation for his move. The shelved story of Meleparambil Aanveedu was returned by Mohan, for an amount of ₹20,000. Calicut-based film writer, Raghunath Paleri, was selected to write the screenplay. Gireesh initially told the story to the director Shaji Kailas, who turned it down since he was interested in action films back then and offered to direct it some other time. Later, Kailas invited producer Goodknight Mohan to the film and after Gireesh briefed the story, Mohan immediately gave an advance of ₹10,000.

=== Casting ===
The originally decided cast included Jayaram, along with Shobhana, Meena, Jagathy Sreekumar, Oduvil Unnikrishnan etc. Vijayaraghavan was later signed in to do the mostly serious character in the film. Narendra Prasad, who was typecast for villain roles, was selected later. Innocent was originally cast for the role by Janardhanan. He rejected the offer as he was busy with another film, Sakshal Sreeman Chathunni. Janardhanan, widely known for his villain roles, was thus selected to do the comedy role. The others in the cast are Vinu Chakravarthy, Priyanka etc.

=== Filming ===
The film was initially set in Salem in the script and was to be shot there. However, a practical change was made to replace Salem with Pollachi, both in the script as well as the filming location.

== Box office ==
The film was a commercial success and ran for more than 200 days.

== Soundtrack ==
The soundtrack for the film was composed by Johnson Master and lyrics penned by Girish Puthenchery, I.S. Kundoor, and Kavinjar Kaalidasan. It proved popular upon release.

| Song | Artist(s) | Lyrics |
|---|---|---|
| "Vellithinkal" | K. J. Yesudas | Girish Puthenchery |
| "Madhura Swapnangal" | K. J. Yesudas, Sujatha Mohan | I. S. Kundoor |
| "Vellithinkal" | K. J. Yesudas, Minmini | Girish Puthenchery |
| "Ooru Sanam Odi Vannu" | K. J. Yesudas, Minmini, Chorus | Girish Puthenchery, Kannadasan |

== Remakes ==
Meleparambil Anveedu was remade in Tamil twice, as Valli Vara Pora (1995) and Naiyaandi (2013). In August 2012, the producer of Meleparambil Anveedu, Mani C. Kappan, announced to remake the film in Assamese in a press conference held in Guwahati. Kappan himself produced and directed the film, titled Borolar Ghor (2012) under the banner of Okay Productions.
