= Choornikkara =

- Census town
- Location in Kerala, India
- Coordinates: 10.0974100°N 76.380850°E
- Country: India
- State: Kerala
- District: Ernakulam

Government
  - Type: Grama Panchayat
  - Body: Choornikkara Grama Panchayat
  - President: Nasseer Choornikkara (INC)

Population (2001)
  - Total: 36,998

Languages
  - Official: Malayalam, English
- Time zone: UTC+5:30 (IST)

Choornikkara is a census town located in Aluva in the Ernakulam district of Kerala, India. It is also the headquarters of the Choornikkara Gram Panchayat.

== Demographics ==
As of 2001 India census, Choornikkara had a population of 36,998. Males constitute 50% of the population and females 50%. Choornikkara has an average literacy rate of 83%, higher than the national average of 59.5%; with male literacy of 85% and female literacy of 80%. 11% of the population is under 6 years of age.

== Borders ==
- South – Kalamassery Municipality, Eloor municipality
- North -Aluva Municipality, Keezhmadu, Kadungalloore Panchayath in Aluva taluk
- East – Edathala, Keezhmadu Panchayath
- West – Eloor, Kadungallore Panchayath

== Eminent Personalities ==
- M.V. Devan
- N. F. Varghese
- Xavier Pulppatt
- J. Pallassery
