= Borolar Ghor =

Borolar Ghor বৰলাৰ ঘৰ বরলার ঘর
- Theatrical release poster
- Directed by: Mani C. Kappan
- Produced by: Mani C. Kappan
- Starring: Utpal Das; Debasmita Benarjee; Nipon Goswami; Purnima Pathak Saikia; Mani C. Kappan; Sreelekha Mukherji; Bishnu Kharghoria etc.
- Cinematography: M.D.Sukumaran
- Edited by: Saurav Das
- Music by: K R Srijit
- Production company: Okay Productions
- Release date: 2 November 2012
- Country: India
- Languages: Assamese; Bengali
- Budget: ₹8 million (US$83,000)

Borolar Ghor ( Bachelor’s House) is a 2012 bilingual Assamese-Bengali romantic comedy film starring Utpal Das and Debasmita Banerjee in the lead roles. The film was directed and produced by Mani C. Kappan under the banner of Okay Productions. This film was the remake of 1993 superhit Malayalam film Meleparambil Aanveedu, which was also produced by Kappan under the same production house. Noted Assamese filmmaker Manju Borah acted as an advisor in the film.

== Plot ==
Madhukrisha (Utpal Das) is the youngest son of Hariprashanna (Nipon Goswami). His brothers Jaykrishna (Julen Bhuyan) and Gopikrisha (Biki), as well as Madhu are all unmarried. He passed his MBA and went to West Bengal for a job. Madhu sees a young Bengali woman named Mukta (Debasmita Benarjee) who is the daughter of a rich man (Mani C. Kappan). The two fall in love and elope.

Madhu is afraid of whether or not his parents would agree to their marriage, so he keeps Mukta undercover as a maid in his home. When Madhu goes away on business, his parents realise that Mukta is pregnant and decide to dismiss her from her job. When Madhu returns home, he is forced to reveal that Mukta is his wife. Madhu's mother, who likes Mukta, scolds him for keeping his wife as a servant – she and her husband express their willingness to accept Mukta as their daughter-in-law.

== Cast ==
- Utpal Das as Madhukrisha
- Debasmita Benarjee as Mukta
- Nipon Goswami as Hariprashanna, father of Madhukrisha
- Purnima Pathak Saikia as Bhanumati, mother of Madhukrisha
- Mani C. Kappan as Bankimchandra, father of Mukta
- Sreelekha Mukherji as mother of Mukta
- Bishnu Kharghoria as Kulen Saikia, an Assamese businessman staying in West Bengal
- Julen Bhuyan as Jaykrishna, unmarried elder brother of Madhukrishna
- Biki as Gopikrishna, unmarried elder brother of Madhukrishna
- Shibu as Purnendu
- Siddharth Mukharjee

== Production ==
Borolar Ghor is the first Assamese film produced by a production house based on South India. On 10 August 2012, Mani C Kappen, owner of Okay Productions, along with Manju Borah announced making a new commercial film in a press conference held in Guwahati. According to Kappan, "I have found that the culture of my state (Kerala) and Assam were quite similar. So I thought to make a film here." Sixty per cent of the dialogues in the bilingual film were in Assamese and the remaining in Bengali. Assamese subtitle was given for Bengali dialogues and Bengali subtitles were given for Assamese dialogues.

The film was dedicated to Dr. Bhupen Hazarika.

== Release ==
Borolar Ghor was supposed to release on 19 October 2012, but due to unavailability of theatres it was postponed to release after two weeks on 2 November 2012.

The premier show of the movie was held on 30 October 2012 at Anuradha Cineplex, Guwahati.

== Soundtrack ==
Borolar Ghor

Soundtrack album by K.R. Srijit
- Released: 30 October 2012
- Genre: Soundtrack
- Length: 29:44
- Label: Universal Music

The soundtrack of the film was released on 30 October 2012 at Guwahati along with its premier show. The music was composed by south Indian music director K.R. Srijit. The music for the song "Junti Olal" was originally composed by Malayalam music director Johnson for the original film "Meleparambil Aanveedu". The original song was "Vellithinkal poonkinnam thulli thoovi". The music for this song is adapted as it is in the Assamese remake also. The album consists of 6 tracks and was released under the label of Universal Music. The lyrics of the songs were penned by Dilip Kumar Borah.

Track listing
No.	Title	Singer(s)	Length
1.	"Eikhon Dekh Mur"	Debojit Saha	4:42
2.	"O Mur Lahori"	Debojit Saha, Tarali Sarma	5:12
3.	"Aajker Din Subha Din"	Tarali Sarma	6:51
4.	"Junti Olal"	Debojit Saha, Tarali Sarma	4:12
5.	"Eikhan Dekh Mur (Female)"	Tarali Sarma	4:42
6.	"Hewali Phule Aaji"	Debojit Saha, Tarali Sarma	4:05
Total length:			29:44
