= N. F. Varghese =

Indian actor (1950–2002)

- Born: Nadakkaparambil Francis Varghese; 6 January 1950; Choornikkara, Travancore Cochin, India
- Died: 19 June 2002 (aged 52); Aluva, Kerala, India
- Education: Union Christian College, Aluva
- Occupation: Actor
- Years active: 1985–2002
- Spouse: Rosy
- Children: 4
- Parents: Francis; Alice

Nadakkaparambil Francis Varghese (6 January 1950 – 19 June 2002) was an Indian actor who worked in the Malayalam film industry. He began his career as a mimicry artist in Kalabhavan, acting in minor roles, but later he turned to strong villainaous roles. Akashadoothu was his major break through in career. He acted in more than 100 films. He died at the age of 53 when he suffered a heart attack and fell unconscious while driving his car. He lived along with his wife, three daughters and a son. His most notable roles include Lelam (1997), Pathram (1999), Narasimham (2000), Valliettan (2000), Praja (2001), and Unnathangalil (2001).

== Personal life ==
He was born into the Nadakkapparambil family in Choornikkara near Aluva, Kerala, as the third child among 5 children of Francis and Alice from Uliyannoor island. He attended primary school at Vidya Raja School Kadungallur. He later pursued an M.A. in Malayalam from Union Christian College, Aluva.

He was married to Rosy from the Kollamkudy family in Kalady. The couple have four children named Sofia, Sony, Sumitha, and Saira.

== Career ==
N.F. Varghese started his career as a mimicry artist in Kalabhavan. He later became a member of Cochin Harishree. He also worked as a manager in these mimicry troupes. He first acted in a small role in the 1986 film Pappan Priyappetta Pappan, written by Siddique-Lal and directed by Sathyan Anthikkad. The movie was produced by the owner of Cochin Harishree, G. S. Harindran itself and was the debut movie of Siddique-Lal duo along with Harisree Asokan. Later, Varghese went on to act in small roles in several movies and it was the 1993 film Akashadoothu, which gave a breakthrough in his film career. In this movie, which is considered one of the most influential melodramas of the 1990s in Malayalam, he played the antagonist role. He later went on to act on several memorable character and villain roles in Malayalam cinema. N.F. Varghese is best known for his roles in movies such as Spadikam, Samudayam, Aksharam, Lelam, Kudamattam, Patram, Commissioner, Sallapam, Punjabi House, Manthramothiram, Narasimham, Praja, Dubai, Ravanaprabhu, Unnathangalil, Nandanam, Ustaad, F.I.R, Valliettan, Nariman, Sundara Purushan, Priyam, Vazhunnor, Onnaman and Phantom.

== Selected filmography ==
1. Eeran Sandhya (1985) as Police inspector
2. Akalathe Ambili (1985) as Police officer
3. Poovinu Puthiya Poonthennal (1986) as Benny's fake father
4. Pappan Priyappetta Pappan (1986) as Prabhakaran (debut movie)
5. Simon Peter Ninakku Vendi (1988) as Police Officer
6. Ramji Rav Speaking (1989) as Office staff
7. Oru Kochu Bhoomikulukkam (1992)
8. Aayushkalam (1992) as Police Inspector
9. Akashadoothu (1993) as Kesavan
10. Uppukandam Brothers (1993) as Chacko
11. Thalamura (1993) as M. M. Thomas
12. Naaraayam (1993) as Chelakkadan the politician
13. Butterflies (1993) as Balan Menon
14. Bhoomi Geetham (1993) as Gangadharan
15. Gandhari (1993)
16. Sagaram Sakshi (1994)
17. Puthran (1994) as Thankachan
18. Prathakshinam (1994) as Paily the father of Rahel (Mathu)
19. Manathe Vellitheru (1994) as Abdullah
20. Kadal (1994) as Anandan
21. Commissioner (1994) as Menon
22. Chukkan (1994) as S.I. Chandran
23. Street (1995)
24. Karma (1995)
25. Spadikam (1995) as Pachu Pillai
26. Mazhayethum Munpe (1995) as Kaimal
27. Thovalapookkal (1995) as Colonel Gopalan Thambi
28. Special Squad (1995) as Ahamed
29. Sipayi Lahala (1995) as Varma
30. Samudhayam (1995) as Saithali
31. Rajakeeyam (1995) as Rajadeva Varman
32. Peter Scott (1995) as George Mathew
33. Aksharam (1995) as Valappadu Balakrishnan
34. Agrajan (1995)
35. Mahaathma (1996) as Baba Rahim
36. Swarna Kireedam (1996) as Varghese Thiruvampady
37. Sallapam (1996) as Chandran Nair
38. Rajaputhran (1996) as Isaac Thomas
39. Mr. Clean (1996) as Dr. Alex
40. Laalanam (1996) as Advocate Rajedran
41. Kanchanam (1996) as Professor Ravi
42. Excuse Me Ethu Collegila (1996)
43. Ee Puzhayum Kadannu (1996) as Sukumaran
44. Varnapakittu (1997) as Priest
45. Guru (1997)
46. Lelam (1997) as Kadayadi Raghavan
47. Sammanam (1997) as Vasudevan
48. Oru Yathramozhi (1997) as a Police officer
49. Oru Mutham Manimutham (1997) as Krishna Menon
50. Masmaram (1997) as Viswanathan
51. Manthramothiram (1997) as Kuruppu
52. Kudamaattom (1997)
53. Kalyanak Kacheri (1997)
54. Innalekalillaathe (1997) as Eppachan a Member of Parliament
55. Guru Sishyan (1997)
56. Gangothri (1997) as Adv. Nambiar
57. Gajaraja Manthram (1997)
58. Five Star Hospital (1997) as Dr. Nambiar
59. Itha Oru Snehagatha (1997)
60. Bhoopathi (1997) as Moosa
61. Anubhoothi (1997) as Shankan Nair
62. Aattuvela (1997)
63. The Truth (1998) as Poozhimattom Thomachan
64. Punjabi House (1998) as Sujatha's Father
65. Oro Viliyum Kathorthu (1998) as Padmanabhan Nair
66. Mayajalam (1998) as Sankaran Nair
67. Graama Panchaayathu (1998) as Gunashekharan
68. Amma Ammaayiyamma (1998) as Kaimal
69. Achaammakkuttiyude Achaayan (1998) as Kozhipalli Avarachan
70. Vazhunnor (1999) as Thevakattu Kuruvilla
71. Ustaad (1999) as Mohan Thampi
72. Swastham Grihabaranam (1999) as Pattatharayil Bhargava Kuruppu
73. Stalin Sivadas (1999) as Sakhavu Anandan
74. Pathram (1999) as Viswanathan
75. Pallavur Devanarayanan (1999) as Mezhathoor Vaidyamatam Namboothiri
76. Njangal Santhushtaranu (1999) as Kurukkal
77. F.I.R (1999) as Retd. IG Bhargavan Panicker IPS
78. Crime File (1999) as IG James George
79. Chandamama (1999) as Mampulli
80. Chandranudikkunna Dikkil (1999)
81. Narashimham (2000) as Manappally Pavithran
82. Sahayathrikakku Snehapoorvam (2000) as Sajan's father
83. Vinayapoorvam Vidhyaadharan (2000) as M.S. Nair
84. Varnakkazhchakal (2000) as Sudhakara Menon
85. Valliettan (2000) as Mambaram Bava
86. Sathyameva Jayathe (2000)
87. Priyam (2000) as Thomachan
88. Nadan Pennum Natupramaniyum (2000) as Bheeran
89. Mark Antony (2000) as mullakka
90. Cover Story (2000)
91. Korappan The Great (2001) as G.N.D. Panikker
92. Narasimha (2001; Tamil)
93. Raavanaprabhu (2001) as Paul
94. Sundara Purushan (2001) as Ramachandra Menon
95. Nariman (2001) as (CM doctor) Dr. Giri
96. Unnathangalil (2001) as Velu Bhai
97. Praja (2001) as Home minister Lahayil Vakkachan
98. Onnaman (2001) as Salim Bhai
99. One Man Show (2001) as Dr. Nambiar
100. Nagaravadhu (2001) as Parameswaran Namboothiri
101. Dubai (2001) as Chandran Nair
102. Ee Nadu Innale Vare (2001) as Gauridas Ambalakkadan
103. Nandanam (2002) as Sreedharan
104. Snehithan (2002) as Padmanabhan
105. Shivam (2002) as Sukumaran Nair
106. Dany(2002) as Prof. Padmanabha Menon
107. Chirikkudukka (2002) as Dr. Ninan
108. Swarna Medal (2002) as Devadas
109. Kaashillatheyum Jeevikkam (2002)
110. The Gift Of God (2002)
111. Kanalkiredam (2002)
112. Phantom (2002) as Chellappan Pillai
113. Chandramukhi (2003)
114. Sahodharan Sahadevan (2003) as Doctor (final film role)
115. Kaduva (2022) as Karinkandathil Chandykkunju (Photo Credit)

== Dubbing artist ==
Year	Title	Dubbed For	Character
1992	Kulapathy	Radha Ravi	Rajanna
1992	Vietnam Colony	Vijaya Rangaraju	Rowther
1995	Radholsavam	Spadikam George	Bhargavan

== Television ==
- Dr. Harischadra (Doordarshan)
- Mikayelinte Santhathikal (Doordarshan)
