= Varnakkazhchakal =

2000 Indian film by Sundar Das

Varnakkazchchakal
- VCD cover
- Directed by: Sundar Das
- Written by: V. C. Ashok
- Produced by: K. C. Jose
- Starring: Dileep; Poornima Indrajith; Jagathy Sreekumar
- Cinematography: Ramachandra Babu
- Edited by: L. Bhoominathan
- Music by: Mohan Sithara
- Production company: Suryakanthi Productions
- Distributed by: Suryakanthi Productions
- Release date: 10 August 2000
- Country: India
- Language: Malayalam

Varnakkazchchakal (transl. Colorful Views) is a 2000 Indian Malayalam-language comedy drama film directed by Sundar Das. The film stars Dileep, Poornima Indrajith, and Jagathy Sreekumar in lead roles. It has a musical score by Mohan Sithara.

== Plot ==
The story deals with an aristocratic family and its filial defects. Kunju is the youngest member of the aristocratic family and has an elder brother, Sudhakaran Menon, whom everyone respects and fears. Kunju's sister-in-law is led by greed and halts any marriage proposals coming to Kunju to avoid sharing family wealth. Kunju's brother also follows his wife's lead in this matter. However, the elder brother's business deals result in losses which puts the family's livelihood at stake. His pride makes him fall further into debt.

Kunju suffers from schizophreniform disorder after witnessing the death of his girlfriend, Malavika, during his college days in Palakkad. He falls in love with a lower-class woman, Sridevi, despite the objections of his family. Sudhakaran Menon gets cheated by his lawyer and their clay factory is confiscated through illegal means. This disturbs Kunju and he attacks the new owners in a psychotic fit and kills those who cheated them. Sudhakaran Menon asks Kunju for forgiveness for his misdoings. The court absolves Kunju from his actions citing his mental disorder. Eventually, Kunju unites with Sridevi.

== Cast ==
- Dileep as Kunju
- Poornima Mohan as Sreedevi/Cheeru
- Sishwa as Malavika
- Sangeetha as Susan
- Jagathy Sreekumar as Kaimal
- Kalabhavan Mani as Kunjandi
- KPAC Lalitha as Kunju's mother
- Ambika as Bhagyalakshmi
- Bindu Panicker as Saumini
- KPAC Premachandran as Haridas, Renuka's father
- K. T. S. Padannayil as Jayaraman, Damu's relative
- Lena as Renuka
- Mala Aravindan as Chathutti
- Manka Mahesh as Renuka's mother
- N. F. Varghese as Sudhakaran Menon
- Oduvil Unnikrishnan as Pothuval
- Ponnamma Babu as Subadra
- Ravi Menon as Shankarankutty, Subadra's husband
- Risabava as Thomachan
- Sreenath as Advocate Satheesh
- Jagannatha Varma as Bhageerathan, Malavika's father
- Sruthi Lakshmi as Child artist
- Chandrika
- Kozhikode Sarada as Kali
- Nandu Pothuval as Peon
- Sreehari as Damu

== Soundtrack ==
The music was composed by Mohan Sithara and the lyrics were written by Yusufali Kechery.

No.	Song	Singers	Lyrics	Length (m:ss)
1	"Ente Peru Vilikkayaano"	K. J. Yesudas, K. S. Chithra	Yusufali Kechery	
2	"Hamsadhwani"	K. J. Yesudas, K. S. Chithra	Yusufali Kechery	
3	"Hamsadhwani"	K. J. Yesudas	Yusufali Kechery	
4	"Indraneelam"	K. S. Chithra	Yusufali Kechery	
5	"Indraneelam" (M)	K. J. Yesudas	Yusufali Kechery	
6	"Moonam Thrikannil"	K. S. Chithra, Mohan Sithara	Yusufali Kechery	
7	"Pattu Chutti"	K. S. Chithra, Chorus	Yusufali Kechery	
8	"Pattu Chutti Pottum" (M)	K. J. Yesudas	Yusufali Kechery	

== Reception ==
A critic from indiainfo.com wrote, " Sunderdas has, through Varnakaazhchakal, made a film that reiterates that family subjects don’t easily lose their charm as far as Malayalam cinema is concerned".
