= Ival Draupadi =

- Directed by: T Rajan
- Starring: Vani Viswanath
- Music by: Sunil Bhaskar; Rajamani; NP Prabhakaran; Perattupuram Madhu
- Release date: 30 June 2000
- Country: India
- Language: Malayalam

Ival Draupadi (spelt onscreen as Ival Droupathi) is a 2000 Indian Malayalam film directed by T Rajan and starring Vani Viswanath and Kalabhavan Mani.

== Cast ==
- Vani Viswanath as Ajitha Madhavan
- Sujitha as Anitha Madhavan
- Kozhikode Narayanan Nair as Madhavan
- Mala Aravindan as Ravunni
- Shaju as Sudhi
- Kalabhavan Mani as Comm. Alex David
- Madhupal as Ameer Khan
- Mafia Sasi
- Spadikam George as Divakaran
- VK Sreeraman as Koya

== Soundtrack ==
The film has songs composed by Sunil Bhaskar, Rajamani, NP Prabhakaran, and Perattupuram Madhu.

All lyrics are written by Girish Puthenchery.

Track listing
No.	Title	Music	Singer(s)	Length
1.	"Kalakalam"	Sunil Bhaskar	P. Jayachandran
2.	"Mizhi Nananju"	Rajamani	K. J. Yesudas	3:31
3.	"Nunachi Penne"	Rajamani	K. S. Chithra, Sunil Kumar P. K., Viswanath	3:23
4.	"Onnaam Veli"	NP Prabhakaran	M. G. Sreekumar
5.	"Pakalppakshi" (Solo)	Perattupuram Madhu	K. J. Yesudas	5:36
6.	"Pakalppakshi" (Duet)	Perattupuram Madhu	K. J. Yesudas, K. S. Chithra	4:02
7.	"Thaliridum"	Rajamani	K. S. Chithra	5:06
8.	"Thaliridum"	Rajamani	Sunil Kumar P. K.	5:17

== Reception ==
A critic from Sify wrote, "With a rather weak script and ineffective dialogues and dialogue-delivery and of course almost poor performance by those in the cast, Ival Droupadi is most likely to satisfy only a limited number of the audience". The reviewer added that "the film was anyhow not worse than the recently released Mohanlal-starrer" Life Is Beautiful (2000).
