= Lelam =

- VCD cover
- Directed by: Joshiy
- Written by: Renji Panicker
- Produced by: Seven Arts Films; Executive Producer: G.P. Vijayakumar
- Starring: Suresh Gopi; M.G. Soman; Siddique; N. F. Varghese; Nandini; Spadikam George
- Cinematography: Sanjeev Shankar
- Edited by: K. Sankunni
- Music by: S.P. Venkatesh (score); Ouseppachan (songs)
- Production company: Seven Arts Films
- Distributed by: Seven Arts International Ltd.
- Release date: 18 October 1997
- Running time: 180 minutes
- Country: India
- Language: Malayalam

Lelam (transl. Auction) is a 1997 Indian Malayalam-language action thriller film directed by Joshiy and written by Renji Panicker. It stars Suresh Gopi and M. G. Soman with Siddique, N. F. Varghese, Nandini, Maniyanpilla Raju, Vijayakumar, Spadikam George, and Kaviyoor Renuka in supporting roles. It was also the last film of the veteran actor M.G. Soman. The story revolves around the rivalry between two liquor business groups, the Aanakkattil family and Kadayadi family. The film was dubbed in Tamil as Yelam and into Telugu as Royal Challenge. Lelam was a blockbuster at the box-office and is also among the highest grossers of the 1990s.

Lelam was considered major comeback film for the actor Suresh Gopi which returned him the Super Star tag after the three-year long run of stereotyped roles which mostly failed at box office. The character Aanakkattil Chackochi, played by the actor still remains one of his career-best roles till date.

== Plot ==
Captain Jacob Stephan aka Anakkattil Chackochi, who along with his friend Karimbanadan Sunny leave for Pollachi to meet Andipetti Veerapandi Thevar, who deals with a spirit business. Though initially differs to negotiate, Thevar agrees to help them, after learning that Chackochi is the son of Eappachan. On their way back to Kerala, they are stopped at the check post by a cop named John Maruthanayagam, who happened to be Chackochi's colleague in the army and helps them in leading back. Back at home, Chackochi's father, Anakattil Eappachan is a famous liquor baron, who holds almost a monopoly over spirit business over Pathanamthitta and Kottayam.

Eappachan is always at loggerheads with his business rivals Kunnel-Kadayadi Group (K.K Group) popularly known as Kadayadi siblings — Kadayadi Raghavan, Kadayadi Thambi and Kadayadi Baby enjoys a partnership with Kunnel Mathachan and his sons Kunnel Outha and kunnel chandi in their business. Eappachan, who hails from a poor background has emerged to such a position with his hard work and struggle that he had never forgotten his roots, but he had to clash with Kadayadi and Kunnel group over the business. Chackochi is enjoying his life as a planter in the company of his friends Hussein and Oommachan and also shares a passionate relation with a royal lineage girl and RDO officer Gowri Parvathi.

K.K Group always loses to Eappachan, but they have never stopped their illegal ways to eliminate him. At the same time, Eappachan agrees to give his share of profits to them in order to settle things peacefully, but they are not satisfied and in an attempt to regain the past glory in business, Kadayadi and Kunnel clans join with Excise Minister Balakrishnan and Eappachan's lieutenant Kattithara Paappi, where Baby stabs Eappachan to death by ambushing him from behind. Chackochi is now forced to take charge of the business and has to face several problems from cops and rivals. Jayasimhan, who is investigating Eappachan's murder, is also a part of the Kadayadi syndicate, which makes Chackochi investigate the case himself.

The police presents a local suspect named Keeri Vasavan as the Eppachan's killer, who is granted bail due to lack of evidence in court. Chackochi is not ready to buy this argument and suspects Kadayadi and Kunnel families behind the ambush of Eppachan. Chackochi decides to hand over the liquor business to his employees, which shocks his enemies and friends alike. Karimbanadan Sunny, who was aiming Chackochi's business empire joins with Kadayadi group a day before the auction of spirit. He sinisterly sells out Hussein, who is now under the custody of the Kadayadis. Hussein is beaten brutally, but he never reveals the business secrets of Chackochi.

Within a short time, Chackochi reaches Hussein to save him, but is shocked to see Sunny among his enemies. In the following fight, Thampi and Sunny are killed. Chackochi beats up Kadayadi Raghavan, Kunnel Mathachan and Kunnel Outha. Outha is killed by Hussein. When Baby is about to be killed by Chackochi, Gowri Parvathi stops him, where Chackochi is ready to forgive, but Baby shoots them both enraging Chackochi, who throws Baby leading to the liquor bottles fall on him. Raghavan catches fire, killing him. A fire breaks out where the liquor explodes, killing Baby but Chackochi successfully escapes with Hussein, Gowri Parvathi and Ommen.

== Cast ==
- Suresh Gopi as Captain Jacob Stephen (Aanakattil Chackochi) Main Protagonist
- M.G. Soman as Aanakkattil Eappachen, Main Protagonist, Kochu Thresia's Husband Chackochi, Ammini, Kunjumol's Father, Killed By Abkari group named KK Group(Kunnel-Kadayadi Group)
- Siddique as Hussain
- Maniyanpilla Raju as Ummachan
- N. F. Varghese as Kadayadi Raghavan, Second Main Antagonist, Elder among the Kadayady siblings
- Spadikam George as Kadayadi Baby, First Main Antagonist, Second among the kadayady siblings
- Subair as Kadayadi Thampi, Fourth Main Antagonist, Youngest among the Kadayadi Siblings
- Vijayakumar as Sunny Cherian Karimpanal
- Nandini as Gowri Parvathi
- Cochin Haneefa as CI Jayasimhan, Right hand of Kunnel-Kadayadi(KK) Group
- K. P. A. C. Azeez as Kunnel Mathachen, Outhakutty and chandys Father, Fourth Main Antagonist
- Sathaar as Kunnel Outhakutty, Third Main Antagonist
- Sadiq as Kunnel Chandy, Fifth Main Antagonist
- Kaviyoor Renuka as Kochu Thresia Kochu, Eappachen's wife and Chackochi's mother
- Sreejaya Nair as Ammini, Chackochi's Sister
- Rehana Navas as Kunjumol, Chackochi's Sister
- Kollam Thulasi as Kattithara Pappi
- Shammi Thilakan as CI John, Police Officer
- Vinu Chakravarthy as Andipetti Veerapandi Thevar
- Mohan Jose as Keeri Vasavan
- T. P. Madhavan as Minister Balakrishnan
- Jagannatha Varma as Bishop
- Kunchan as Kaimal
- Narayanankutty as MLA Sadasivan
- Aranmula Ponnamma as Revathi Thirunal Thampuratti
- Aliyar as K.P. Prahaladan
- Chali Pala as Champakuzhi Jose
- Nandu Pothuval as Gopi
- Charan Raj as SP George Marudunayagam (Special Appearance)
- Abraham Koshy as Sub Inspector of Police
- Antony Palakkan as Sakhavu Krushchev Kunjachan

== Release ==
The film was released on 18 October 1997.

=== Critical reception ===
Indian Express wrote "If you're in the mood for tears, blood and weak jokes, check out this particular Lelam’". Times of India wrote "It's a sizzler of an action movie. When director Joshi strikes, he spews venom. The film packs punch and stands out for the riveting performances from Suresh Gopi, Siddique and M.G. Soman". Jayalakshmi K. of the Deccan Herald wrote that "Lelam means auction and here we are dealing with a liquor auction. So what if one does not reach the auction, the action en route provides good entertainment and some seat-edge thrills.".

=== Box office ===
The film was a blockbuster at the Keralite box office.

== Soundtrack ==
The film's soundtrack contains 4 songs, all composed by Ouseppachan and Lyrics by Gireesh Puthenchery.

| # | Title | Singer(s) |
|---|---|---|
| 1 | "Kunkumamo" | Biju Narayanan, K. S. Chitra |
| 2 | "Kunkumamo II" | P. Unnikrishnan, K. S. Chitra |
| 3 | "Kurumaali Kunninu" | M. G. Sreekumar, Sujatha Mohan |
| 4 | "Urukiyuruki" | K. J. Yesudas |

== Legacy ==
Lelam is hailed as one of the best movies in Suresh Gopi's career, and is also considered as one of the greatest mass entertainers ever made. It also marks the final film role of M.G. Soman whose timeless dialogues in the movie are still popular.

== Cancelled sequel ==
On 9 March 2019, The Times of India reported that Suresh Gopi has confirmed that there would be a sequel to the film, titled Lelam 2. He also added that he would be playing the same character as in the prequel as Aanakattil Chackochi, while his son Gokul Suresh plays Kochu Chackochi. The film is written by Renji Panicker and would be directed by his son Nithin Renji Panicker. In July 2024, Nithin Renji Panicker confirmed that the sequel is shelved.
