= Ee Nadu Innale Vare =

2001 film by I. V. Sasi

Ee Nadu Innale Vaare
- VCD cover
- Directed by: I. V. Sasi
- Written by: K. S. Noushad
- Screenplay by: K. S. Noushad
- Starring: Lal; Vani Viswanath; Kalabhavan Mani
- Cinematography: J. Sivakumar
- Music by: S. P. Venkatesh
- Release date: August 3, 2001
- Country: India
- Language: Malayalam

Ee Nadu Innale Vaare is a 2001 Indian Malayalam film, directed by I. V. Sasi, written by K. S. Noushad, starring Lal, Vani Viswanath and Kalabhavan Mani.

== Cast ==
- Lal as Plappalli Sreedharan
- Vani Viswanath as Beena Benachamin IPS
- Kalabhavan Mani as Seythu
- Sindhu Menon as T. K. Sreeja
- N. F. Varghese as Ambalakkadan Gowridas
- Narendra Prasad as Ambalakkadan Vishwambharan
- Rajan P. Dev as Chief Minister
- Bheeman Raghu as Aana Kasim
- Babu Namboothiri as Trikottor Vaidair
- Spadikam George as CI Edappally Surendran
- Cochin Haneefa as Chandrakumaran
- Madhupal as T. K. Vijayan
- Subair as Kuriakose
- Kaviyoor Renuka as Savitri
- Kochu Preman as Divakaran
- Jose Pellissery as Parameswaran
- Salim Kumar
- Kollam Ajith as Pappy
- Abu Salim
- Pradeep Kottayam
- C. T. Ismail

== Production ==
The film marked the debut of Pradeep Kottayam.

== Reception ==
A critic from Sify wrote, "Sasi's latest film after a long break Ee Nadu Ennale Vare is another film in the same genre with new crop of actors" and concluded that the film was "[o]ld wine in [a] new bottle".
