= Vani Viswanath =

Indian actress

- Born: Ollur, Thrissur, Kerala
- Occupation: Actress
- Years active: 1986–present
- Spouse: Baburaj (m. 2002)
- Children: 2
- Awards: Kerala State Film Awards; 2000

Vani Viswanath is an Indian actress who predominantly appears in Malayalam and Telugu films. In 2000, Vani won the Kerala State Film Award for Second Best Actress for her performance in Susanna, directed by T. V. Chandran. She was termed as Mollywood's "Action Queen". In 2017, she joined in Telugu Desam Party in Andhra Pradesh.

== Early life ==
Vani was born in Ollur, Thrissur, as the fourth among five children of astrologer Vishwanathan and Girija. She did her schooling at St. Raphael's Convent Girls High School, Ollur, and thereafter at Chennai. When she was 13, her father predicted through astrology that she would become an actor and also that she would join politics.

== Career ==
She has appeared predominantly in Malayalam and Telugu movies. She acted in The King with Mammootty and in Usthad with Mohanlal and in Chinthamani Kolacase with Suresh Gopi respectively. She also appeared in Kannada and Tamil movies. She was among the big stars of her time in South India. Her Tollywood movie Gharana Mogudu with Tollywood superstar, Chiranjeevi was a huge hit. Vani also acted in two Hindi film with Mithun Chakraborty in Jung and Bhishma.

== Personal life ==
While acting in several films with Baburaj, she fell in love with him. The couple got married in 2002 and have two children.

== Awards ==
Kerala State Film Awards

- 2000 - Kerala State Film for the Second Best Actress - Susanna

== Filmography ==
=== Malayalam ===
Year	Title	Role	Notes
1987	Mangalya Charthu	Sithara	Debut Film
1988	Evidence	Dahlia	
1992	Aadyaraathrikku Munpu		
1995	Sipayi Lahala	Radhika	
1995	Mannar Mathai Speaking	Meera Varma/Stella Fernandez	
1995	Mangalam Veettil Manaseswari Gupta	Maya Surendran/Manaseswari Gupta	
1995	The King	Anuradha Mukharji	
1995	Thakshashila	Amalendu	
1996	Swarnakireedam	Sindhu	
1996	Man of the Match	Sonia	
1996	Mandrika Kuthira	Ancy Sunny	
1996	Kaliveedu	Yamini Menon	
1996	Hitler	Ammu	
1997	The Good Boys		Cameo Appearance
1997	Poothumbiyum Poovalanmarum	Nanditha	
1997	Kilukil Pambaram	Sugandhi	
1997	Kannur	Annie Rozario	
1997	Janathipathyam	Maya Pillai	
1997	Anubhoothi	Radha	
1998	Ilamura Thamburan	Urmila	
1998	Harthal	Mekhamala S Thampy	
1998	Dravidan	Jiji Philipose	
1998	Panchaloham	Jagadha	
1998	The Truth	SP Meena Nambiar IPS	
1999	Vasanthiyum Lakshmiyum Pinne Njaanum	Jayanthi	
1999	Ustaad	Commissioner Varsha Varma	
1999	The Godman	Adv. Aswathy Menon	
1999	Thachiledathu Chundan	Ambika	
1999	James Bond	Dayana IPS	
1999	Captain	Renuka Varma	
1999	Independence	Indu	
1999	Garshom	Sushama	
2000	The Gang	Kathy Saimon	
2000	India Gate	Parvathi Sharma	
2000	Rapid Action Force	Adithya Varma IPS	
2000	Ival Draupadi	Ajitha Madhavan	
2000	Indriyam	Neeli	
2000	Susanna	Susanna	
2001	Ee Nadu Innale Vare	Beena Benjamin IPS	
2001	Nagaravadhu	Sukanya	
2002	India Gate	IPS Officer	
2002	Puthooramputhri Unniyarcha	Unniyarcha	
2002	Ente Hridhayathinte Udama	Uma	
2002	Ee Bhargavee Nilayam	Bhargavi	
2002	Akhila	Akhila	
2002	Bheri	Vasudha Nedungadi	
2002	Danny	Margarette	
2006	Balram Vs Tharadas	MLA Rani	
2006	Chinthamani Kolacase	Adv.Pattammal	
2008	Twenty:20	in the Title Song	Archive Footage Only
2009	Black Dalia	Daisy Wilfred IPS	
2011	Manushyamrugam		Producer only
2011	Uppukandam Brothers Back In Action	Kochammini	
2024	Oru Anweshanathinte Thudakkam	Sivamalli	
2024	Rifle Club	Ittiyanam	
2025	Azadi	Rani	
2026	Varavu		

=== Telugu ===
Year	Title	Role	Notes
1988	Chinni Krishnudu		
1988	Dharma Teja	Vichya	
1989	Simha Swapnam	Kavita	
1989	Bhale Dampatulu	Vani	
1989	Naa Mogudu Naake Sontham	Sumithra	
1989	Sahasame Naa Oopiri	Padmini	
1990	Kondaveeti Rowdy	Rekha	
1990	Neti Dowrjanyam	Swathi	
1990	Kodama Simham	Bar servant	
1990	Dagudumuthala Dampathyam	Rekha	
1990	Mama Alludu	Jaya	
1990	Maa Inti Katha	Gouri	
1990	Doctor Bhavani	Meghamala	
1990	Rowdyism Nashinchali	Devi	
1990	Prema Yuddham	Julie	
1990	Aayudham	Rangamma	
1991	Chinna Kodalu	Durga	
1991	Irugillu Porugillu	Subbulu	
1991	Parishkaram	Jyothi	
1991	Sarpayagam	Chitrangi	
1991	Nenera Police	Vani	
1992	Collector Gaari Alludu	Madhuri	
1992	Gharana Mogudu	Bhavani	
1992	Seetapathi Chalo Tirupathi	Aliveelu Mangatayaru	
1992	Palleturi Pellam	Kanakadurga Devi	
1992	Alexander	Vaani	
1992	Samrat Ashoka	Tishya Raksha	
1992	Vadinagaari Gajulu	Janaki	
1992	SP Teja		
1993	Joker	Usha Rani	
1993	Ladies Special	Hema	
1993	Mama Kodalu	Deepa	
1993	Prema Chitram Pelli Vichitram	Usha	
1994	Gangmaster	Swapna	
1994	Raitu Bharatam	Sita	
1994	Prema & Co.	Sundari	
1994	Presidentugari Alludu	Lavanya	
1994	Maro Quit India	Durga	
1994	Dongala Rajyam	Vyjayanthi	
1994	Todi Kodallu	Jyoti	
1995	God Father	Rani	
1998	Adavilo Arunakka		
2002	Action No. 1	Kiran	
2002	Janam	Inspector Swapna	
2006	Mudhu		
2011	Ratnavali		
2017	Jaya Janaki Nayaka	Narayana's sister	
2020	Orey Bujjiga	Chamundeswari	
2024	Raajadhani Files	Farmer	

=== Tamil ===
Year	Title	Role	Notes
1986	Mannukkul Vairam	Chinnathayee	
1988	Nallavan	Radha	
1988	Poonthotta Kaavalkaran	Vidhya	
1988	Thaimel Aanai	Vijaya	
1988	Ithu Engal Neethi		
1989	Sanghu Pushpangal	Rosy	
1997	My India	Malavika	
2002	Jaya		
2005	Idhaya Thirudan	Sudharani	
2012	Anandha Thollai		

=== Kannada ===
Year	Title	Role	Notes
1989	Parashuram	Usha	
1990	Sididedda Gandu	Anitha	
1990	Ranabheri	Rosy	
1991	Bombay Dada	Veena	
1991	Mangalya	Lavanya	

=== Hindi ===
Year	Title	Role	Notes
1994	Zakhmi Sipahi	Priya	
1996	Jung	Laxmi Saxena	
1996	Bhishma	Paro	

== Television ==
- Mattoruval (2010) as Annie/Geetha Varma (Surya TV)
- Kaatrinile Varum Geetham as Gayathri Devi (Sun TV)
- Samudram (2011)
- Dear Kairali (2002) - (Surya TV) as Host
