= Valliettan =

Vallyettan
- Directed by: Shaji Kailas
- Written by: Ranjith
- Produced by: Anil Ambalakkara; Baiju Ambalakkara
- Starring: Mammootty; Shobana; Sai Kumar; N. F. Varghese; Siddique; Manoj K Jayan
- Cinematography: Ravi Varman
- Edited by: L. Bhoominathan
- Music by: Songs: Mohan Sitara; Score: C. Rajamani
- Production company: Ambalakkara Films
- Distributed by: Amma Arts; Sagar Movies; Rajashree Pictures
- Release date: 10 September 2000
- Running time: 170 minutes
- Country: India
- Language: Malayalam
- Box office: ₹16 crore

Valliettan (transl. Elder brother) is a 2000 Indian Malayalam-language action drama film directed by Shaji Kailas and scripted by Ranjith. It stars Mammootty, Shobana, Sai Kumar, N. F. Varghese, Siddique and Manoj K Jayan. the film is about an elder brother reclaiming his ancestral house and living for his younger brothers. Similar to the Pandavas in Mahabharat, Arackal Madhavanunni and his brothers are winning back their empire.

The film was released on 10 September 2000. It was remade in Kannada as Jyeshta by director Suresh Krissna with Vishnuvardhan in the lead role.

== Plot ==
Arackal Kuttikrishnan Nair loses a civil case against his nephew Arackal Madhavanunni and has to give up the ancestral home, which he has been holding illegally for past long years. Kuttikrishnan Nair's son Patteri Sivaraman takes it as a prestige issue and decides to finish out Madhavanunni, with the help of his trusted lieutenant Nedungadi. Sivaraman has a deep hatred and enmity towards Madhavanuni since childhood and both had involved in several fistfights. Nedungadi sends Varoli Abu to shoot down either Madhavanunni or one of his brothers on their arrival at the house, but the timely intervention of Madhavanunni saves them. Madhavanunni is a self-made rich businessman, who owns several properties inside and outside Kerala.

After the suicide of his parents, Madhavanunni had taken care of his brothers: Raghu, Dasan, Appu and Shankaran Kutty, who all love and respect him. Ramankutty Kaimal, the old caretaker of their property also enjoys a good relationship with Madhavanunni. At his college, Appu is harassed by Subair, the younger brother of Madhavanunni's rival Mambaram Bava Haji. With the help of Kattipalli Pappan, a notorious criminal, Appu thrashes Subair, who dies accidentally and is later arrested for the murder, but is released on bail and Kattipalli Pappan is arrested for the murder. While going to prison, Pappan requests Madhavanunni to take care of his sister Lakshmi, which Madhavanuni accepts.

Madhavanunni brings Lakshmi to his home and is treated as a member of their family. Mambaram Bawa Haji is now looking for a chance to avenge Madhavanunni for his brother's death, where Patteri Sivaraman lends a helping hand to Bawa Haji. One day, Lakshmi is found dead at the pond and Dasan is arrested, but Raghu surrenders to the cops in order to save Dasan. Upon release from prison, Pappan returns to kill Raghu for murdering Lakshmi, but later discovers that Patteri Shivaraman was the mastermind behind Lakshmi's murder. Enraged, Madhavanunni, along with his brothers and Pappan heads to Patteri Sivaraman's house and thrashes him, but later leaves him on the request of Kuttikrishnan Nair and his family. Patteri Sivaraman realizes his mistake and the families reconciles with each other.

== Cast ==
- Mammootty as Arackal Madhavanunni aka Valliettan
  - Biyon as young Madhavanunni
- Shobana as Devi, Madhavanunni's wife
- Sai Kumar as Patteri Sivaraman Nair, Madhavanunni's cousin/Main Antagonist
- Siddique as Raghu, Madhavanunni's younger brother
- Manoj K. Jayan as Dasan, Madhavanunni's younger adopted brother
- Sudheesh as Shankaran Kutty aka Monkuttan, Madhavanunni's younger brother
  - Arun Kumar as Young Shankaran Kutty
- Vijayakumar as Appu, Madhavanunni's youngest brother
- N. F. Varghese as Mambaram Bava Haji
- Innocent as Ramankutty Kaimal, Madhvananunni's adopted father and Dasan's father
- Kalabhavan Mani as Kattipalli Pappan
- Bheeman Raghu as Nedungadi
- Sukumari as Kunjikavamma
- Augustine as Gangadharan
- Captain Raju as DYSP Mohammed Illiyas, Madhavanunni's friend
- Poornima Mohan as Lakshmi, Pappan's sister
- Kozhikode Narayanan Nair as Arackal Kuttikrishnan Nair, Sivaraman's Father and Madhavanunni's uncle
- V. K. Sreeraman as Soopi Haji
- G. K. Pillai as SP Purushothaman IPS
- Sadiq as Bharathan Marar, Madhavanunni's advocate
- Subair as SI Ajith Kumar
- Irshad as Subair, Bava's brother
- Ramu as CI Chandramohan
- Kunchan as Chathunni
- Valsala Menon as Sivaraman's mother
- Dhanya Menon as Thankamani, Monkuttan's love interest
- Ajith Kollam as Marodi Abu
- Thalapathy Dinesh as Goonda
- Yamuna as Sivaraman's wife
- Meena Ganesh as Chathunni's wife
- Santhakumari as Ajith Kumar's mother
- Remadevi as Vilasini teacher
- Haseena Bhanu as Dancer in the song Sivamallipoo pozhikkum
- Ponnamma Babu as Bava's wife
- Nizzar as Soopi Haji's daughter's love

== Soundtrack ==
All lyrics are written by Gireesh Puthenchery; all music is composed by Mohan Sitara.

No.	Title	Artist(s)	Length
1.	"Arupathu Thiriyitta" (Male)	K. J. Yesudas
2.	"Arupathu Thiriyitta" (Female)	K. S. Chitra
3.	"Kannilambum Villum"	M. G. Sreekumar, Afsal
4.	"Niranaazhi Ponnil"	M. G. Sreekumar, Choir
5.	"Nettimele Pottittaalum" (Duet)	K. J. Yesudas, K. S. Chitra
6.	"Nettimele Pottittaalum" (Female)	K. S. Chitra
7.	"Nettimele Pottittaalum" (Male)	K. J. Yesudas
8.	"Shivamallippoo Pozhikkum"	K. S. Chitra
9.	"Smaraami Vaishnavachaarumoorthe"	P. Jayachandran

== Release ==
The film was released in Kerala on 10 September 2000. The film was a major commercial success at the box office that year.

=== Re-release ===
A Digitally Remastered 4K Dolby Atmos version of the film was released in theatres on 29 November 2024 worldwide.
