= Narasimham (film) =

- DVD cover
- Directed by: Shaji Kailas
- Written by: Ranjith
- Produced by: Antony Perumbavoor
- Starring: Mohanlal; Thilakan; Kanaka; N. F. Varghese; Aishwariyaa Bhaskaran; Jagathy Sreekumar
- Cinematography: Sanjeev Sankar
- Edited by: L. Bhoominathan
- Music by: Songs: M. G. Radhakrishnan; Score: C. Rajamani
- Production company: Aashirvad Cinemas
- Distributed by: Swargachitra
- Release date: 26 January 2000
- Running time: 175 minutes
- Country: India
- Language: Malayalam
- Budget: ₹1–2 crore (Note: Narasimham's reported budgets vary between ₹1 crore (Malayala Manorama) 2 crore (International Business Times))
- Box office: est. ₹22 crore

Narasimham (transl. The man-lion) is a 2000 Indian Malayalam-language action drama film directed by Shaji Kailas and written by Ranjith. Narasimham was released on 26 January 2000, India's 50th Republic Day, and ran for 200 days in theatres and grossed over 20 crores worldwide, which was a record in the Kerala box office. The film stars Mohanlal in the title role with Thilakan, Kanaka, N. F. Varghese, Aishwariyaa Bhaskaran and Jagathy Sreekumar in pivotal roles. Mammootty appears in a cameo role. The film was the first production of Aashirvad Cinemas, owned by Antony Perumbavoor, the former chauffeur of Mohanlal.

The film was re-released under the name Narasimham Returns in 2014, which premiered in Dubai and was re-released in Kerala on several occasions, where it still enjoys a cult following. The film was remade in Telugu as Adhipathi (2001), starring Mohan Babu, Nagarjuna Akkineni, Preeti Jhangiani and Soundarya.

== Plot ==
Poovalli Induchoodan, the only son of the idealistic High Court Judge Maranchery Karunakara Menon, is wrongfully convicted and sentenced to six years in prison for the murder of a classmate. He later learns that the conspiracy was orchestrated by Home Minister Manappally Madhavan Nambiar and his associate DYSP Sankaranarayanan, who sought revenge against Menon for previously sentencing Nambiar in a corruption case. As a result of his conviction, Induchoodan loses his place in the civil service, which is subsequently secured by Nambiar's younger son, Sudheeran. It is later revealed that the actual murderer was Ramakrishnan, the son of Nambiar's loyal supporter Mooppil Nair.

After serving his sentence, Induchoodan is released from prison following Madhavan Nambiar's death. He returns to Kerala with his parents and soon becomes embroiled in a renewed conflict with Nambiar's elder son, Manappally Pavithran. During this period, a young woman named Indulekha claims to be Menon's illegitimate daughter. Initially dismissed and humiliated by the family, she is later revealed to be telling the truth. Upon learning this from his maternal uncle Chandrabhanu, Induchoodan accepts her as his sister and takes responsibility for her protection.

Induchoodan arranges Indulekha's marriage to his friend Jayakrishnan and persuades Menon to acknowledge her as his daughter. Menon eventually regrets his past actions and privately reconciles with her. However, the following day, Indulekha is found murdered, and Menon is arrested for the crime. The murder is revealed to be part of a plot devised by Pavithran, who kills Indulekha and coerces Menon's longtime servant Raman Nair into giving false testimony against him.

In court, Supreme Court lawyer Nandagopal Marar, a close friend of Induchoodan, successfully exposes the conspiracy and proves Menon's innocence, leading to his acquittal. After his release, Menon expresses remorse for his past mistakes, including his failure to trust Induchoodan's innocence. Shortly thereafter, he suffers a stroke and dies.

At Menon's funeral, Pavithran arrives to mock Induchoodan and resume the funeral rites of his own father that had previously been interrupted. Induchoodan confronts him and exacts revenge for the deaths of Indulekha and Menon by severely injuring him. The film concludes with Induchoodan leaving behind his turbulent past and accepting Anuradha, the forthright daughter of Mooppil Nair, as his life partner.

== Cast ==
- Mohanlal as Poovali Induchoodan "Achu"
- Thilakan as Justice Maranchery Karunakara Menon, Induchoodan's father
- N. F. Varghese as Manappally Pavithran, Nambiar's elder son
- Aishwariyaa Bhaskaran as Anuradha, Induchoodan's love interest and Mooppil Nair's Daughter (voiceover by Sreeja Ravi)
- Jagathy Sreekumar as Poovalli Chandrabhanu, Induchoodan's maternal uncle
- Augustine as Eradi, Panchayath district president
- Bharathi as Poovalli Sharada, M. K. Menon's wife and Induchoodan's mother
- Spadikam George as Kalletti Vasudevan
- Kanaka as Indulekha, Induchoodan's sister (voiceover by Bhagyalakshmi)
- T. P. Madhavan as Raman Nair
- Vijayakumar as Jayakrishnan, Induchoodan's best friend
- Irshad as Gopalan, Induchoodan's friend
- Kalabhavan Mani as Bharathan, Induchoodan's friend
- Sadiq as Govindankutty, Induchoodan's friend
- Saikumar as SP Manappally Sudheeran, Nambiar's younger son
- Maniyanpilla Raju as CI Habeeb, Induchoodan's friend
- V. K. Sreeraman as Venu Master
- Kozhikode Narayanan Nair as Manappally Madhavan Nambiar
- Narendra Prasad as Mooppil Nair, Ramakrishnan and Anuradha's father
- Bheeman Raghu as DySP Sankaranarayanan
- Mohan Raj as Bhaskaran
- E. A. Rajendran as Kalletti Ramakrishnan, Mooppil Nair's son
- Kuthiravattam Pappu as Sharadi, Indulekha's relative
- Reena as Anuradha's mother
- Ponnamma Babu as Jayalakshmi teacher
- Kollam Ajith as Vasudevan, Pavithran's henchmen
- Kollam Thulasi as Public Prosecutor Gopinathan
- Jagannatha Varma as Justice Pillai
- Mammootty as Adv. Nandagopal Marar (cameo appearance)

== Soundtrack ==
Narasimham

Soundtrack album by M. G. Radhakrishnan
- Released: 2000
- Genre: Feature film soundtrack
- Length: 31:05
- Labels: Sargam Speed Audios; Satyam Audios
- Producer: Antony Perumbavoor

M. G. Radhakrishnan chronology
Kannezhuthi Pottum Thottu (1999)	Narasimham (2000)	Pilots (2000)

The film's original soundtrack includes five songs composed by M. G. Radhakrishnan and a total of eight tracks. Lyrics were by Gireesh Puthenchery. The soundtrack album was released by Sargam Speed Audios and later the audio right was acquired by Satyam Audios. The song "Aarodum Onnum" featuring Mohanlal and Aishwarya is not included in the film's home video version.

Narasimham (Original Motion Picture Soundtrack)
No.	Title	Singer(s)	Length
1.	"Narasimham"	K. J. Yesudas	3:50
2.	"Manjin Mutheduthu"	M. G. Sreekumar, K S Chithra	4:40
3.	"Aarodum Onnum" (Male version)	K. J. Yesudas	5:32
4.	"Amme Nile" (Version 1)	K. J. Yesudas	4:03
5.	"Manjin Mutheduthu" (Female version)	K S Chithra	4:39
6.	"Amme Nile" (Version 2)	M. G. Sreekumar	4:13
7.	"Aarodum Onnum"	K. J. Yesudas, Sujatha Mohan	5:16
8.	"Pazhanimala"	M. G. Sreekumar	5:35

== Release ==
Narasimham was released on 26 January 2000 on India's Republic Day. It was re-released on 5 December 2014 in Dubai after 15 years. The re-release was part of a special programme organised under the title Narasimham Returns on the occasion of celebrating the 15th anniversary of the film. It premiered at Golden Cinemas, Dubai. The premiere was attended by the major cast and crew of the film and subsequent screenings was received well by public. Later, it was released in Kerala.

In 2016, Narasimham Returns was re-released in seven districts in Kerala. The special screenings were held in Ernakulam, Alappuzha, Thrissur, Kottayam, Kannur, Pathanamthitta and Kollam on 26 January 2016.

=== Box office ===
The film was released in 32 centres in Kerala. It collected a distributor's share of ₹2 crore (US$210,000) in 35 days from the state. The film completed 200 days in theatres. Producer's profits were estimated at ₹10 crore. Narasimham generated around ₹7 crore for the distributor's share. At the time, the film was the highest-grossing film in Malayalam cinema. The film also created history for screening with maximum number of additional shows for any Malayalam film, which took 16 years to surpass by Premam (2015). It is one of the highest rated films in the television.

The film grossed ₹21 crore (US$2.2 million) at the box office against a budget of ₹2 crore (US$210,000), making it the highest-grossing Malayalam film ever, at the time. It ran for more than 200 days in theatres.

=== Accolades ===
Kerala Film Critics Award

- Best Popular Film - Shaji Kailas (director)

Asianet Film Awards

- Best Film - Antony Perumbavoor (producer)
- Best Director - Shaji Kailas

== Legacy ==
Mohanlal's punch dialogue in the film Nee Po Mone Dinesha has become an iconic Malayalam catchphrase. The Mundu worn by Mohanlal in this film, popularly known as Narasimham Mundu, became a fashion trend among youngsters. The film includes five songs composed by M. G. Radhakrishnan, of which Dhaankinakka/Pazhanimala and Mohanlal's introduction song attained a high level of popularity. The film was the 1000th acting credit of Jagathy Sreekumar.

=== PoMoneModi campaign ===
Two years after being elected as the prime minister, Narendra Modi visited the state of Kerala in May 2016 to campaign for the BJP in the 2016 Kerala Legislative Assembly election. During a campaign rally, Modi gave a speech in which he compared the infant mortality rate (IMR) of Kerala to that of Somalia. Kerala is one of the most religiously heterogeneous states in India, and the Kerala model has consistently been praised as one of the most socially developed states. At the time of his remarks, Kerala had the lowest IMR in India at 10, while Gujarat's was 30, the national average stood at 34, and Somalia had an IMR of 137. As a consequence, a social media campaign took off using the hashtag PoMoneModi ("Go Back Modi"), inspired by the famous Narasimham punchline.
