= Subair =

Indian film actor

- Born: Subair P. P. 25 May 1962; Chokli, Kannur, Kerala, India
- Died: 18 August 2010 (aged 48); Cochin
- Years active: 1991-2010
- Spouse: Dilshad

Subair (25 May 1962 – 18 August 2010) was an Indian actor in Malayalam cinema industry. He was part of Malayalam films for nearly two decades and acted in around 200 films.

== Personal life ==
Subair was born in the village of Chokli, Thalasserry in Kannur District, Kerala, India as the son of Sulaiman and Aysha. He died on 18 August 2010 due to a cardiac arrest. He has two sons, Aman Subair and Ameya Subair

== Career ==
Subair started his career in movies as a film producer at the age of 28. He produced a movie together with four of his friends, but the movie was never released. His first movie as an actor was Bharatham in 1991 followed by the 1992 movie Manthrikacheppu. His break came through the character Kadayadi Thambi in Lelam (1997). The Tiger, Bharathchandran I.P.S. and Pathaka are his notable works.

He has also acted in a mega tele-serial named Vamsham telecasted in DD Malayalam channel in 1994.

== Selected filmography ==
Year	Title	Role	Notes
1991	Bharatham		
1991	Kanalkattu	Police Inspector	
1992	Yodha		
1992	Pappayude Swantham Appoos		
1992	Manthrika Cheppu	M. L. A	
1992	First Bell	Thomas	
1992	Priyapetta Kukku	Prakashan	
1993	Sthalathe Pradhana Payyans	Bahuleyan	
1993	Gandharvam	Police Inspector	
1993	Akashadoothu	Doctor	
1997	Aaraam Thampuran	Eby Mathew	
1997	Lelam	Kadayadi Thampi	
1997	Mannadiar Penninu Chenkotta Checkan	Narendra Mannadiyar	
1998	Elavamkodu Desam		
1998	Sooryavanam	Jery	
1998	The Truth		
1999	Pranaya Nilavu		
1999	The Godman		
1999	Crime File	Paul Varghese	
2000	Valliettan	Ajith Kumar	
2000	Dreams	Pappachan	
2000	Gandharva Rathri		
2000	Mazhanoolkkanavu	Rasheed	
2000	Ingane Oru Nilapakshi	Sudhakaran	
2000	Arayannangalude Veedu	Police Officer	
2001	Saivar Thirumeni	Xavier Joseph	
2001	Mazhameghapravukal		
2001	Sravu		
2001	Ee Nadu Innale Vare	Kuriakose	
2001	Jeevan Masai	Mothi	
2002	Swarna Medal	Gupthan	
2002	Jagathy Jagadeesh in Town	Varmaji	
2002	Stop Violence		
2002	Snehithan	Anu's father	
2002	Sivam	Sadanandan	
2003	Kaliyodam		
2003	The King Maker Leader	Ananthutty	
2003	Melvilasam Sariyanu	George	
2004	Sethurama Iyer CBI		
2004	C. I. Mahadevan 5 Adi 4 Inchu	Williams	
2005	December	Sankara Narayanan	
2005	Isra		
2005	Immini Nalloraal	Police Officer	
2005	Police	Somaraj	
2005	Bharathchandran I.P.S.	Mayin Kutty M. L. A	
2005	The Tiger	Rajan Manjooran IPS	
2006	Balram vs. Taradas	Minister Musthafa	
2006	Pathaaka	Rasheed	
2006	Mahasamudram		
2006	Rashtram	CI Basheer	
2006	The Don	Koya Sahib	
2006	Oruvan	Doctor	
2006	Pakal		
2006	Lanka	Renji	
2006	Bada Dosth	Chief Minister	
2006	Palunku	Police Officer	
2007	Detective		
2007	Aakasham	IG	
2007	Khaki	Adv. Sugunan	
2007	Nadiya Kollappetta Rathri	Alexander Chempadan	
2008	Thirakkatha	Director	
2008	Bullet		
2008	Roudram	Kambilikkandam Jose	
2009	I G Inspector General	Police Officer	
2009	Pazhassi Raja		
2009	Thathwamasi		
2010	Drona 2010	Driver Kunjambu	
2010	Kayam		
2010	Brothers		
2010	Chekavar		
2010	The Thriller		
2011	Christian Brothers		

== Television ==
- Pankiyamma (Telefilm, Doordarshan)
- Vamsham (DD Malayalam)
- Kadamattathu Kathanar (TV series)
- Black and White (Asianet)
