= Poornima Indrajith =

Indian actress and television presenter

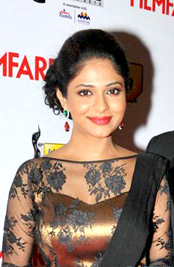
- Poornima in 2013
- Born: Poornima Mohan; Thiruvananthapuram, Kerala, India
- Other name: Anu
- Education: St. Teresa's College, Kochi
- Occupations: Actress; Television presenter
- Years active: 1986(child artist); 1995–present
- Spouse: Indrajith Sukumaran (m. 2002)
- Children: 2 (including Prarthana Indrajith)
- Relatives: Sukumaran (father-in-law); Mallika Sukumaran (mother-in-law); Prithviraj Sukumaran (brother-in-law)

Poornima Indrajith (née Poornima Mohan) is an Indian actress and Television host, who works predominantly in Malayalam films.Starting her career as child artist to minor supporting roles, she appeared in more than a dozen of movies overall.

== Early and personal life ==
Poornima Indrajith was born to Mohan and Shanthi, in a Tamil family that settled in Kerala. Her mother tongue is Tamil. Her father is a practicing lawyer, and her mother runs a dance school. She has a younger sister, Priya Mohan, who is also an actress.

Poornima is a graduate in Mass Communications from St. Teresa's College, Kochi. She is married to actor Indrajith Sukumaran. They have two daughters including singer Prarthana Indrajith. She is the daughter-in-law of the late Sukumaran and Mallika Sukumaran. Prithviraj Sukumaran is her brother-in-law.

== Career ==
Poornima started her career as a model and then acted in a successful Tamil TV serial Kolangal. She then acted in many TV serials in Malayalam Television serial industry. Following this she acted in supporting roles in movies, including Meghamalhar (2001), Valliettan (2000) and Randam Bhavam (2001).

After 17 years, she made a comeback with Virus which was included in The Hindu's top 25 Malayalam films of the decade.

== Filmography ==
=== As actor ===
- All films are in Malayalam language unless otherwise noted.

List of Poornima Indrajith film credits as actor
Year	Title	Role	Notes	Ref.
1986	Onnu Muthal Poojaym Vare	Deepamol's classmate	Child artist	
1995	Sipayi Lahala	Rajani		
1997	Innalekalillaathe	Maya		
1997	Kadhalukku Mariyadhai	Latha	Tamil remake of Aniyathipraavu	
1999	Cotton Mary	Receptionist	English film	
2000	Valliettan	Lakshmi		
2000	Varnakkazhchakal	Sridevi/Cheeru		
2001	Dany	Madavi		
2001	Meghamalhar	Rekha		
2001	Unnathangalil	Julie		
2001	Randaam Bhavam	Akhila		
2001	Naranathu Thampuran	Sridevi		
2019	Virus	Dr. Smrithy Bhaskar		
2022	Cobalt Blue	Sister Mary	Hindi film	
2023	Thuramukham	Umma (Pathu)		
2023	Kaala Paani	Swasti Shaw	Hindi web series	
2024	Oru Kattil Oru Muri	Akkamma		
2025	Balti	G-Maa	Malaylam-Tamil bilingual film	

== Television ==
=== Television shows as host ===
List of Poornima Indrajith television show credits as host
Year	Program	Channel	Language	Notes	Ref.
1998	Pepsi Top Ten	Asianet	Malayalam	Reality show	
1998	Your Choice	Asianet	Malayalam	Game show	
1998	Hi-Power Dubai Telequiz	Asianet	Malayalam	Game show	
2008	Mega Swarna Mazha	Surya TV	Malayalam	Reality show	
2009	Amul Sangeetha Mahaayudham	Surya TV	Malayalam	Reality show	
2010	Amul Sangeetha Mahaayudham 2	Surya TV	Malayalam	Reality show	
2011–2012	Kadha Ithu Vare	Mazhavil Manorama	Malayalam	Talk show	
2014	Idavelayil	Mazhavil Manorama	Malayalam	Talk show	
2016–2017	Kuttikalodano Kali?	Mazhavil Manorama	Malayalam	Reality Show	
2017	Fashion Notes	Vanitha Online	Malayalam	Talk show	
2017	Get Stylish	Kappa TV	Malayalam	Talk show	
2017–2018	Made for each other season 2	Mazhavil Manorama	Malayalam	Reality Show	
2018	North American Film Awards – NAFA 2018	Asianet	Malayalam	Award Show	

=== Television shows as judge ===
List of Poornima Indrajith television show credits as a judge
Year	Program	Channel	Language	Notes	Ref.
2008	Vanitha Ratnam	Amrita TV	Malayalam	Reality show	
2015	Ugram Ujwalam	Mazhavil Manorama	Malayalam	Reality show	
2019	The Dream Design	Vanitha Fashion	Malayalam	Special show (Jury /Model)	
2023	Ente Amma Supera	Mazhavil Manorama	Malayalam	Reality show	
2023–present	Kidilam	Mazhavil Manorama	Malayalam	Reality show	

=== Television serials (Partial list) ===
List of Poornima Indrajith television credits
Year	Serial	Channel	Language	Notes	Ref.
2000–2001	Nizhalukal	Asianet	Malayalam		
2002	Peythozhiyathe	Surya TV	Malayalam	Breakthrough role as Yamini	
2002–2004	Oomakkuyil	Surya TV	Malayalam		
2003–2004	Sthree Oru Santhwnam	Asianet	Malayalam	Breakthrough role as Kanchana	
2007–2009	Kolangal	Sun TV	Tamil	Tamil debut as Menaka (Meenu) and Chellamma (Dual role)	
