= Bhagyalakshmi =

Indian dubbing artist

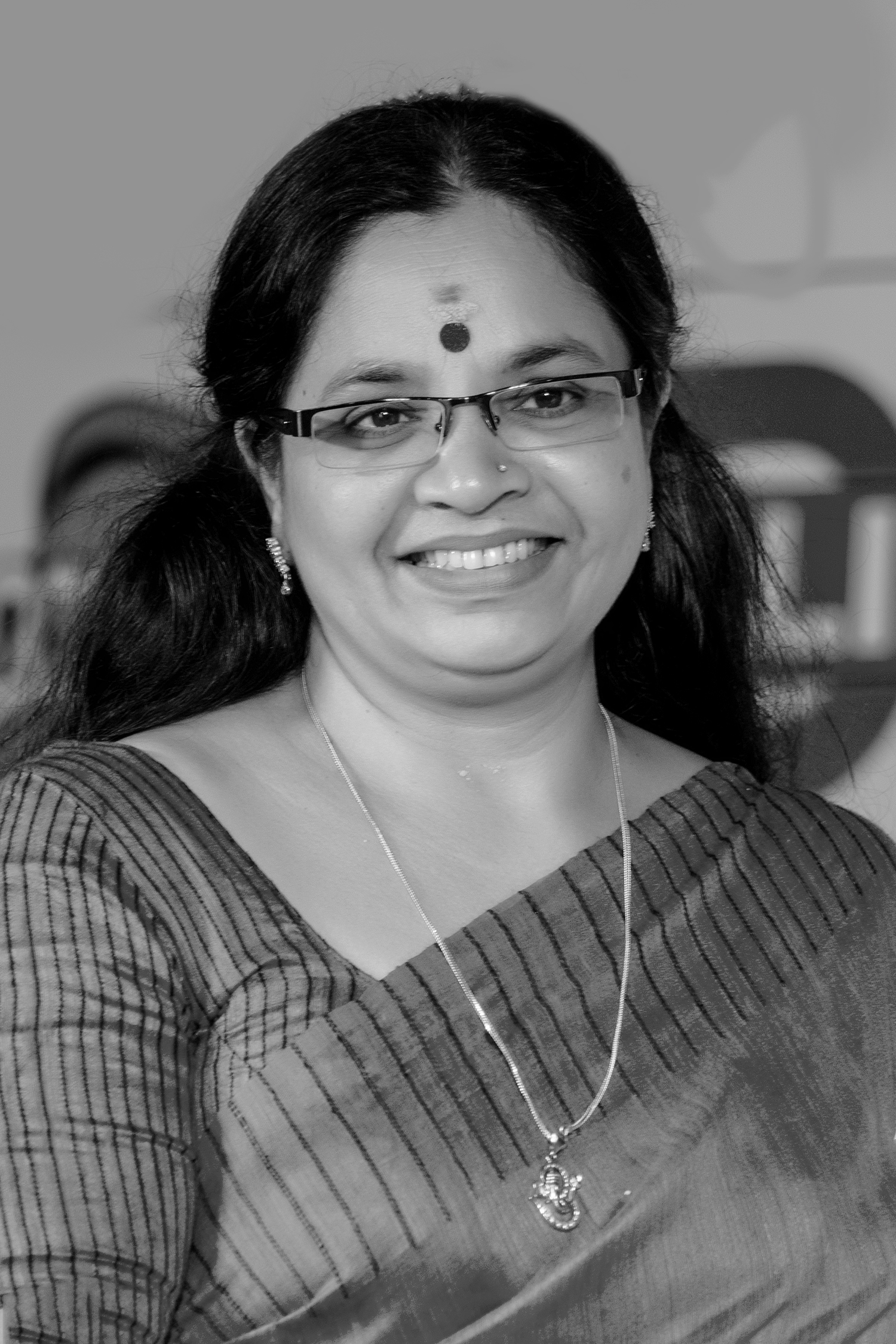
- Born: 1 November 1961 (age 65); Kozhikode, Kerala, India
- Other name: Bhagyam
- Occupations: Dubbing artist; Television host
- Years active: 1972–present
- Spouse: K. Ramesh Kumar (m. 1985; div. 2014)

Bhagyalakshmi (born 1 November 1961) is an Indian actress, activist, and dubbing artist. She works predominantly in the Malayalam film industry. She has collaborated with several actresses from Malayalam industry as well as other South Indian languages including Shobana, Revathi, Urvashi, Soundarya, Tabu and Jyothika. Bhagyalakshmi's autobiography, Swarabhedangal, was awarded the Kerala Sahitya Akademi Award for Biography and Autobiography.

== Career ==
Bhagyalakshmi began dubbing for young performers at the age of ten, and debuted as an actress in Manassu (1973). She made her film dubbing debut in Aparathi (1977), and from 1978 to 1980 continued to dub films for child actors and supporting actress. She later rose to prominence in Kolilakkam (1981), in which she dubbed for Sumalatha. Her breakthrough in the Malayalam film industry came with Nokkethadhoorathu Kannum Nattu (1984). In 2021 she competed in the reality TV show Bigg Boss Malayalam Season 3, but was evicted on day 49.

She has won the Kerala State Film Award for Best Dubbing Artist three times. She was also a traveller who works for Safari channel for a special program "Ente Yatre".

== Personal life ==
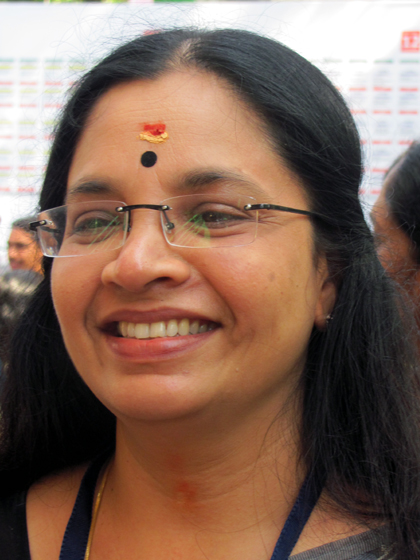
Bhagyalakshmi in 2010

Bhagyalakshmi was born on 1 November 1961 in Kozhikode, Kerala, India to Kumaran Nair and Bhargavi Amma. She has an older sister Indira Nair, and a brother Unni Nair. Both of her parents died while she was young.

She started her career as a dubbing artist at the age of 10 and went on to complete her pre-university course while working in the film industry.

Bhagyalakshmi married K. Ramesh Kumar on 27 October 1985. The couple has two sons. They separated in 2011 and divorced in September 2014.

== Publication ==
Bhagyalakshmi published her autobiography, Swarabhedangal, which was selected by Nielsen Data for its best-seller list, the first time a Malayalam book had been selected.

== Controversy ==
=== Assault case ===
On 26 September 2020, Bhagyalakshmi and two other activists, Diya Sana and Sreelakshmi Arakkal, poured black motor oil on a YouTube vlogger named Vijay P. Nair at his Thiruvananthapuram residence. Nair had uploaded a number of derogatory videos about women, and the trio claims there had been no action on the multiple complaints they had filed with police. They also alleged that one of his videos was a personal insult to her, even though her name was not explicitly mentioned. She and the other two were charged with non-bailable offences, including trespass and intimidation.

== Awards and honours ==
Year	Award	Award Category	Awarded Work	Dubbed for
1991	Kerala State Film Awards	Best Dubbing Artist	Ulladakkam; Ente Sooryaputhrikku Bali	Amala Kanya bharathi
1995	Kerala State Film Awards	Best Dubbing Artist	Ormayundayirikkanam; Kusruthikattu Shashinas	Priyambada Ray; Kanaka Geetha vijayan
2002	Kerala State Film Awards	Best Dubbing Artist	Yathrakarude Sradhakku	Soundarya
2002	Kerala Film Critic Award	Kerala Film Critic Award for Best Dubbing Artist	Yathrakarude Sradhakku	Soundarya
2015	Kerala State Television Awards	Best Anchor	Selfi (talk show)	
2013	Kerala Film Critic Award	Kerala Sahitya Akademi Award for Biography and Autobiography	Swarabhedangal	
2012	Asianet Television Awards	Best Dubbing Artist	Kumkumapoovu	Asha Sharath
2018	Kerala State Film Critic Award	Chalachithra Prathiba Award	For Various Film Works	
2014	Kerala State Film Critic Award	Special Honour	The Contribution to the Malayalam Film Industry (As A Dubbing Artist And As An Actress)	
2017	National Film Awards	National Film Award for Best Anthropological/Ethnographic Film as Producer	Name, Place, Animal, Thing	

== Bibliography ==
- Bhagyalakshmi (2012), Swarabhedhangal (in Malayalam), Kottayam, Kerala: DC Books, ISBN 9788126439348

== Partial filmography ==
=== As dubbing artist ===
Dubbed for	Films
Child Artist	Chanchala (1974)
Child Artist	Manimuzhakkam (1976)
Master Karan	Aparadhi (1977)
Child artist	Air hostess (1980)
Renu Chandra	Thiranottam (1978); Manassinte Theerthayathra (1981)
Jayanthi	Deepam (1980)
Jayshree Talpade	Abhinayam (1981)
Nisha Noor	Avatharam (1981)
Sumalatha	Kolilakkam (1981); Aranjanam (1982); Ee Thanutha Veluppan Kalathu (1990)
Ambika	Premageethangal (1981); Marakkillorikkalum (1983); Puzhayozhukum Vazhi (1985); Nirabhedangal (1987); Swathi Thirunal (1987); Ezhuthapurangal (1987)
Radha	Revathikkoru Pavakutty (1986)
Sathyakala	Thaalam Thettiya Tharattu (1983); Changatham (1983); Ee Vazhi Mathram (1983)
Vidhubala	Abhinayam (1981) (One scene only)
Jalaja	Onnu Chirikku (1983); Kudumbam Oru Swargam Bharya Oru Devatha (1984)
Rani Padmini	Kathayariyathe (1981)
Nithya	Paanchajanyam (1981); Maniyan Pilla Adhava Maniyan Pilla (1981)
Sadhana	Ariyappedatha Rahasyam (1981)
Anjali Naidu	Angachamayam (1982)
Rajyalakshmi	Aarambham (1982); Ahankaram (1983)
Poornima Jayaram	Gaanam (1982)
Arundhati	Kakka (1982)
Uma	Sandhyakku Virinja Poovu (1983); Ashtapadi (1983); Itha Innu Muthal (1984)
Reena	Aadyathe Anuraagam (1983)
Vanitha Krishnachandran	Belt Mathai (1983)
Kanakalatha	Parasparam (1983); Jagratha (1989)
Menaka	Shesham Kazhchayil (1983); Thirakal (1984); Onnum Mindatha Bharya (1984); Veendum Chalikkunna Chakram (1984); Naale Njangalude Vivahum (1986); Doore Doore Oru Koodu Koottam (1986); Living Together (2011); Vaadhyar (2012)
Bhagyalakshmi	Manasariyathe (1984)
Sumithra	Aalkkoottathil Thaniye (1984)
Anuradha	Raajavembaala (1984); Jeevante Jeevan (1985); Ithu Nalla Thamasha (1985)
Swapna	Postmortem (1982); Minimol Vathicanil (1984); Kadathanadan Ambadi (1990)
Kuthiravattam Pappu	Post Mortem (1982) (Female portion)
Ilavarasi	Oru Kochu Swapnam (1984)
Mammootty	Sandarbham (1984) (Female portion-One scene only)
Unni Mary	Poomadathe Pennu (1984); Pathamudayam (1985); Arapatta Kettiya Gramathil (1986)
Viji	Uyarangalil (1984)
Nadiya Moidu	Nokkethadhoorathu Kannum Nattu (1984); Kandu Kandarinju (1984); Onningu Vannengil (1985); Koodum Thedi (1985); Vannu Kandu Keezhadakki (1985); Panchagni (1986); Shyama (1986) Poovinu Puthiya Poonthennal; Sevenes (2011); Girls (2016)
Shobhana	Ithiri Poove Chuvannapoove (1984); Eeran Sandhya (1985); Thammil Thammil (1985); Upahaaram (1985); Yatra (1985); Aalorungi Arangorungi (1986); Chilambu (1986) ee Thedi (1986); Rareeram (1986); Kshamichu Ennoru Vakku (1986); Moonu Masangalkk Munpe (1986); Naalkavala (1987); Aalilakkuruvikal (1988); Kalikkalam (1990); Innale (1990); Meleparambil Anveedu (1993); Manichithrathazhu (1993) (only Ganga's character); Minnaram (1994); Commissioner (1994) Vishnu (1994); Thenmavin Kombathu (1994); Manathe Vellitheru (1994); Mazhayethum Munpe (1995); Minnaminuginum Minnukettu (1995); Sindoora Rekha (1995); Aramana Veedum Anjoorekkarum (1996); Hitler (1996); Rajaputhran (1996); Kunkumacheppu (1996); Superman (1997); Kalyana Kacheri (1997); Kaliyoonjal (1997); Agnisakshi (1999); Valliettan (2000); Mampazhakkalam (2004); Sagar Alias Jacky (2009); Varane Aavashyamundu (2020); Thudarum (2025) (Effects only)
Revathi	Ente Kaanakkuyil (1985); Aankiliyude Tharattu (1987); Puravrutham (1988); Najagalude Kochu Doctor (1989); Kilukkam (1991) (after interval scenes); Adhwaytham (1992); Devasuram (1993); Padheyam (1993); Raavanaprabhu (2001); Krishna Pakshakilikal (2002); Nandanam (2002); Gramaphone) (2003); Kilukkam Kilukilukkam (2006) (Phone call); Paattinte Palazhy (2010) Penpattanam (2010); Virus (2019)
Kalaranjini	Swandam Enna Padam (1980); Ente Mohangal Poovaninju (1982); Paavam Krooran (1984)
Urvashi	Ente Ammu Ninte Tulasi Avante Chakki (1985); Dheivatheyorthu (1985); Karimpoovinakkare (1985); Pathamudayam (1985); Nirakootu (1985); Mizhineerppoovukal (1986); Kshamichu Ennoru Vakku (1986); Moonnu Masangalkku Munpe (1986); Onnu Randu Moonnu (1986); Sukhamo Devi (1986); Sunil Vayassu 20 (1986); Yuvaganostavam (1986); New Delhi (1987); Anuragi (1988); Mattoral (1988); Thanthram (1988); Mazhavilkavadi (1989); New Year (1989); Swagatham (1989); Kuttettan (1990); Lal salam (1990); Nanma Niranja Sreenivasan (1990); Thalayanamanthram (1990); Vyuham (1990); Kalippattam (1993); Kanalkattu (1991); Thiruthalvaadi (1992); Midhunam (1993); Sthreedhanam (1993); Aayirappara (1993); Injakkadan Mathai & Sons (1993); Venkalam (1993); Kudumbavishesham (1994); The City (1994); Pidakkozhi Koovunna Noottandu (1994); Bharya (1994); Sukham Sukhakaram (1994); Thovalapookkal (1995); Simhavalan Menon (1995); Spadikam (1995); Garshom (1999)
Neelima Azeem	Kaliyil Alpam Karyam (1984)
Aarti Gupta	Jeevante Jeevan (1985)
Surekha Marie	Muhurtham Pathnonnu Muppathinu (1985)
Mahalakshmi	Angadikkappurathu (1985); Vilichu Vilikettu (1985)
Mucherla Aruna	Mulamoottil Adima (1985); Sreekrishna Parunthu (1984)
Ahalya	Surabhi Yaamangal (1986)
Sunanda Biswas	Parasparam (1983); Kochu Themmadi (1986)
Lissy	Dheem Tharikida Thom (1986); Hello My Dear Wrong Number (1986); Sarvakalashala (1987); Rugmini (1989) Manivathoorile Aayiram Sivarathrikal (1987)
Karthika	Manicheppu Thurannappol (1985); Thalavattam (1986); Kariyilakkattu Pole (1986); Gandhinagar 2nd Street (1986); Deshadanakkili Karayarilla (1986); January Oru Orma (1987); Neeyethra Dhanya (1987)
Soniya	Ennennum Kannettante (1986)
Asha Jayaram	Onnu Muthal Poojyam Vare (1986)
Chithra	Annoru Ravil (1986); Kaiyethum Dhoorathu(1987); Asthikal Pookkunnu (1989)
Jayaragini	Hello My Dear Wrong Number (1986)
Sabitha Anand	Kanamarayathu (1984); Kaveri (1986)
Kannur Sreelatha	Muhurtham Pathnonnu Muppathinu (1985)
Sudha Chandran	Malarum Kiliyum (1986); Cleopatra (2013)
Cecily	Poomukhappadiyil Ninneyum Kaathu (1986)
Nalini	Snehamulla Simham (1986)
Jayalalita	Uppu (1987)
Pallavi Joshi	Theertham (1987)
Parvathy	Vivahithare Ithile (1986); Oru Minnaminunginte Nurunguvettam (1987); Aparan (1988); Witness (1988); Jagratha (1989); Adhipan (1989); Anagha (1989); Vadakkunokkiyantram (1989); Akkare Akkare Akkare (1990); Radha Madhavam (1990)
Rohini	Achuvettante Veedu (1987); CID Unnikrishnan B.A., B.Ed. (1994); Payyans (2011); Diamond Necklace (2012) Cheriya lokavum valiya Manushyarum (1990)
Mini Arun	Innaleyude Baakki (1988)
Reshmi Kailas	Varshangal Poyathariyathe (1987)
Shari	Archana Pookal (1987); Naradhan Keralathil (1987); Savidham(1992)
Ranjini	Chithram (1988); Mukunthetta Sumitra Vilikkunnu (1988); Nanma Niranjavan Sreenivasan (1990); Anantha Vruthantham (1990); Agni Nilavu (1991)
Sandhya Rani	Vida Parayan Mathram (1988)
Saleema	Aranyakam (1988)
Ramya Krishnan	Aryan (1988); Janmandharam (1988); Appavum Veenjum (2015); Aadupuliyattam (2016)
Urmila Unni	Marattam (1988)
Sudha Swarnalakshmi	Aksharathettu (1989)
Girija Shettar	Vandanam (1989)
Sunitha	Mrigaya (1989); Mukha Chithram (1991); Snehasagaram (1992); Aardram (1992)
Madhavi	Hello Madras Girl (1983); Oru Vadakkan Veeragatha (1989)
Saranya	Artham (1989); Aakasha Kottayile Sultan (1991)
Devishri	Ponnaranjanam (1990)
Raadhu	Ennu Nathante Nimmi (1986); Kadathanadan Ambadi (1990)
Sreeja	Annakutty Kodambakkam Vilikkunnu (1989); Cheriya Lokavum Valiya Manushyarum (1990); Uncle Bun (1991)
Rekha	Ramji Rao Speaking (1989); Randam Varavu (1990) Pavam Pavam Rajakumaran (1990); Aye Auto (1990); Pookkalam Varavayi (1991) Swanthwanam (1991) Kizhakkunarum Pakshi (1991) Mumpe Parakkunna Pakshi (1995); Ivar Vivahitharayal (2009); Bangalore Days (2014) Jo and the Boy (2015)
Maathu	Kuttettan (1990)
Geetha Vijayan	In Harihar Nagar (1990); Ganamela (1991); Sasinas (1995)
Rupini	Midhya (1990); Bandhukkal Sathrukkal (1993)
Amala	Ente Sooryaputhrikku (1991); Ulladakkam (1991)
Shyama	Kilukkam (1991) (One Scene only)
Roopa Sree	Kallanum polisum (1992)
Santhi Krishna	Tharattu (1981); Ennum Nanmakal (1991); Sukrutham (1994)
Radha Prashanthi	Pavam I.A. Ivachan (1994)
Madhu Bala	Neelagiri (1991); Ottayal Pattalam (1992); Ennodu Ishtam Koodamo (1992); Yoddha (1992); Samsaaram Aarogyathinu Haanikaram (2014); Manorathangal (2024)
Charmila	Kabooliwala (1994)
Ashwini	Ee Kannu Koodi (1990)
Archana	Onnaam Muhurtham (1991); Madamma (1996)
Rani	Uncle Bun (1991)
Kanaka	Godfather (1991); Ezhara Ponnana (1991); Vietnam Colony (1992); Golanthara Vartha (1993); Pingami (1994); Vardhakyapuranam (1994); Kusruthikaatu (1995); Mangalyasootram (1995); Mannadiar Penninu Chenkotta Checkan (1996); Manthrikochamma (1998); Narasimham (2000)
Geetha	Athirathan (1991); Panthaya Kozhi (2007)
Suchitra Krishnamoorthi	Kilukkampetti(1991)
Neeta Puri	Mahanagaram (1992)
Neena Gupta	Aham (1992)
Gautami	Daddy (1992); Ayalathe Adheham (1992); Jackpot (1993); Aayiram Naavulla Ananthan (1996)
Seena Dadi	Pappayude Swantham Appoos (1992)
Madhurima Nerla	My Dear Muthachan (1992)
Rudra	Kauravar (1992)
Khushbu	Yaadhavam (1993); Anubhoothi (1997); Stalin Sivadas (1999); Independence (1999); Mr. Marumakan (2012)
Sithara	Vachanam (1990); Bhagyavan (1993); Journalist (1993); Black Butterfly (2013)
Suchitra Murali	Kanyakumariyil Oru Kavitha (1993)
Mohini	Ghazal (1993); Parinayam (1994); Kudumbakodathi (1996); Mayoora Nirtham (1996); Meenakshi Kalyanam (1998); Vesham (2004)
Suhasini Maniratnam	Samooham (1993); Bhaaratheeyam (1997); Nammal (2002); Vilapangalkkappuram (2008); Love 24x7 (2015); Salt Mango Tree (2015) Kalimannu (2013); Solo (2017) Marakkar: Lion of the Arabian Sea (2021-2022)
Priya Raman	Arthana (1993); Sainyam (1994); No. 1 Snehatheeram Bangalore North (1995); Bhoopathi (1997)
Kanchan	Gandharvam (1993)
Ranjitha	Chamayam (1993); Sundari Neeyum Sundaran Njanum (1994)
Priyanka Anoop	Venkalam (1993)
Anju	Varaphalam (1994)
Chippy	Santhanagopalam (1994); Sargavasantham (1995)
Urmila Matondkar	Chanakyan (1989); Thacholi Varghese Chekavar (1995)
Shivaranjini	Pandu Pandoru Rajakumari (1992); Manikya Chempazhukka (1995)
Suma Jayaram	Mazhayathum munpe (1995) (One scene only)
Sudha Rani	Aadyathe Kanmani (1995)
Vinduja Menon	Sreeragam (1995)
Vani Viswanath	Mannar Mathai Speaking (1995); Mangalam Veettil Manaseswari Gupta (1995); Hitler (1996); Swarna Kireedam (1996); Kaliveedu (1996); Kilukil Pambaram (1997); The Truth (1998); Harthaal (1998); James Bond (1999); India Gate (2000); Indriyam (2000) (Except Ghost scenes); Nagaravadhu (2001); Puthooramputhri Unniyarcha (2002); Black Dalia (2009)
Priyamvatha Rai	Ormakalundayirikanam (1995)
Heera Rajagopal	Nirnayam (1995) Minnaminuginum Minnukettu (1995) Oru Abhibhashakante Case Diary(1995) Poothiruvathira Ravil (1998)
Kasthuri	Chakravarthy (1991) Aniyan Bava Chetan Bava (1995); Panchapandavar (1999)
Annie	Puthukkottayile Puthumanavalan (1995); Swapna Lokathe Balabhaskaran (1996)
Prema	The Prince (1996)
Vijayashanti	Yuvathurki (1996)
Bhanupriya	Azhakiya Ravanan (1996); Kulam (1997); Rishyasringan(1997); Manjupoloru Penkutti (2004)
Chandini Saju	Sathyabhamakkoru Premalekhanam (1996)
Divya Unni	Churam (1996); Shibiram (1997); Karunyam (1997); Sooryaputhran (1998); Mark Antony (2000); Nakshathragal Parayathirunnathu (2000)
Sukanya	Thooval Kottaram (1996); Kaanaakkinaavu (1996) Udayon (2007); Innathe Chintha Vishayam (2008)
Tabu	Kaalapani (1996); Cover Story (2000)
Kanya Bharathi	The Hitlist (1996)
Aparna Rao	Masmaram (1997)
Meena	Varnapakittu (1997); Friends (1999); Olympian Anthony Adam (1999); Dreams (2000); Rakshasa Rajav (2001); Mr. Brahmachari (2003); Udayananu Tharam(2005); Chandrolsavam (2005); Magic Lamp (2008)
Pooja Batra	Chandralekha (1997); Daivathinte Makan (2000)
Suma Kanakala	Istadanam (1997)
Vaishnavi MacDonald	Oru Mutham Manimutham (1997)
Sangita Madhavan Nair	Kattathoru Penpoovu (1998); Chinthavishtayaya Shyamala (1998); Vazhunnor (1999); Saphalyam (1999); Pallavur Devanarayanan (1999); Nagara Varidhi Naduvil Njan (2014) Hridayapoorvam (2025)
Sreelakshmi	Mattupetti Machan (1998)
Jayaswathi	Malabaril Ninnoru Manimaran (1998)
Renuka	Samantharangal (1998)
Vineetha	Mayajalam (1998)
Shruti	Oral Mathram (1997); Kottaram Veettile Apputtan (1998)
Nandini	Ayal Kadha Ezhuthukayanu (1998); Karumadikkuttan (2001); Thachiledathu Chundan (1999); Naranathu Thampuran (2001); Sundara Purushan (2001); Jameendar (2001; Udayam (2004); IG (2009)
Anitha Nair	My Dear Karadi (1999)
Kavitha Ladnier	Janani(1999 film)
Priya Gill	Megham (1999)
Sangeetha Krish	English Medium (1999)
Indraja	Ustaad (1999); Chronic Bachelor (2003); Ben Johnson (2005)
Samyuktha Varma	Veendum Chila Veettukaryangal (1999); Angene Oru Avadhikkalathu (1999); Chandranudikkunna Dikhil (1999); Thenkasi Pattanam (2000); Life Is Beautiful (2000); Madhuranombarakattu (2000); Nadanpennum Naattupramaaniyum (2000); One Man Show (2001); Saivar Thirumeni (2001); Meghamalhar (2001); Narendran Makan Jayakanthan Vaka (2001); Kuberan (2002)
Namrata Shirodkar	Ezhupunna Tharakan (1999)
Athira	Dada Sahib (2000); Bharthavudyogam (2001); Www.anukudumbam.com (2002)
Geethu Mohandas	Thenkasi Pattanam (2000); Valkannadi (2002); Pakalppooram (2002) Bharathan Effect (2007)
Rehana Navas	Neelakasham Niraye (2002)
Vaibhavi Merchant	Snehapoorvam Anna (2000)
Poornima Indrajith	Varnakkazhchakal (2000)
Jaya Prada	Devadoothan (2000)
Aswathi Menon	Sathyam Sivam Sundaram (2000)
Lakshmi Gopalaswami	Kochu Kochu Santhoshangal (2000); Achaneyanenikkishtam (2001); Punyam (2001); Smart City (2006); Evidam Swargamanu (2009); Oru Indian Pranayakatha (2013)
Aishwarya	Sathyameva Jayathe (2000); Praja (2001); Jackpot (1993); Inspector Garud (2007)
Manya	One Man Show (2001); Vakkalathu Narayanankutty (2001); Aparichithan (2004)
Rajashree Nair	Megasandesam (2001); Ravanaprabhu(2001); Bhoopadathil Illatha Oridam (2012); Grandmaster (2012)
Anjala Zaveri	Dubai (2001)
Arzoo Govitrikar	Kakkakuyil (2001)
Nandita Das	Kannaki (2001)
Suresh Gopi	Meghasandesham (2001) (Effects only)
Jayasudha	Ishtam (2001)
Sophia Sudeep Kumar	Www.anukudumbam.com (2002)
Soundarya	Yathrakarude Sradhakku (2002); Kilichundan Mampazham (2003)
Roja	Gangotri (1997); Malayali Mamanu Vanakkam (2002)
Nagma	Chathurangam (2002)
Nivedita	Uttara (2003)
Nivia Rebin	Chronic Bachelor(2003)
Tessa Joseph	Pattalam (2003)
Saritha	Ammakilikkoodu (2003); Kathodu Kathoram (1986); Kanikanum Neram (1987)
Devayani	Balettan (2003); Naran (2005); Oru Naal Varum (2010)
Gayatri Jayaraman	Njan Salperu Ramankutty (2004)
Gayatri Shastri	Thekkekara Superfast (2004)
Navya Nair	Chathikkatha Chanthu (2004) (Ghost portions only)
Padmapriya	Kaazhcha (2004); Rajamanikyam (2005); Bhargavacharitham Moonam Khandam (2006); Paradesi (2007); Time (2007); Pachamarathanalil (2008); Bharya Swantham Suhruthu (2009); Maad Dad (2012)
Bhavna Pani	Vettam (2004)
Riya Sen	Ananthabhadram (2005)
Shriya Reddy	Oraal (2005)
Vindhya	Dubai (2001); Isra (2005)
Seetha	Notebook (2006); Vinodayathra (2007); Currency (2007); My Boss (2012) Aaraattu (2022)
Laya	Udayon (2005); Alice In Wonderland (2005); Thommanum Makkalum (2005); Rashtram (2006)
Mamta Mohandas	Baba Kalyani (2006)
Sindhu Menon	Pathaaka (2006); Thommanum Makkalum(2005); Vesham (2004); Rajamanikyam (2005)
Keerthy Suresh	Marakkar: Lion of the Arabian Sea (2021) Effects only
Radhika	Classmates (2006)
Gopika	Smart City (2006) (Emotional scene)
Meera Vasudevan	Eakantham (2006); Oruvan (2006)
Lakshmi Sharma	Ayur Rekha (2007); Nagaram (2007); Makaramanju (2011)
Jyothika	Rakkilippattu (2007)
Bharathi	Aayudham (2008)
Kavya Madhavan	Madampi (2008)
Nithya Menon	Aakasha Gopuram (2008)
Bhavana	Winter (2009)
Gowri Munjal	Paler Manikyam (2009)
Saba Khan	Red Chillies (2009)
Sharbani Mukherjee	Sufi Paranja Katha (2010)
Nayanthara	Body Guard (2010); Lakshmi (2005) (Malayalam-dubbed movie); Yogi (2007) (Malayalam-dubbed movie)
Sneha	Pramaani (2010)
Kiran Rathod	Manushyamrugam (2011)
Shwetha Menon	Salt N' Pepper (2011); Ithramatram (2012); Queen Elizabeth (2023)
Dileep	Mayamohini (2012) Effects only
Zarina Wahab	Aaru Sundarimaarude Katha (2013)
Manisha Koirala	Dil Se (1998) (Malayalam-dubbed movie)
Radhika	Ramaleela (2017); Ittymani: Made in China (2019)
Muthumani	Njaan (2014)
Maya Vishwanath	Alroopangal (2016)
Seema	Stand Up (2019)
Lena	Indriyam (2000)
Kaniha	Bavuttiyude Namathil(2012) To Noora with Love (2014)
Remya Nambeesan	Soorya Kireedam (2007) Frenzy part
Jyothirmayi	Kerala Cafe (2009); Pakal (2006)
Chanchal	Ormacheppu (1998)
Vinaya Prasad	Mookilla Rajyathu (1991); Bhadra (2001)
Nithya Das	Soorya Kireedam (2007)
Monisha	Oru Kochu Bhoomikulukkam (1992)
Kaveri	Thillana Thillana (2003)
Lakshmi Rai	Arabeem Ottakom P. Madhavan Nayarum in Oru Marubhoomikkadha (2012)
Reena Basheer	Pakal Nakshatrangal (2008)
Richa Pallod	Salt N' Pepper (2011) (One scene only)
Sonia Agarwal	Grihanathan (2012)
Parvati Nair	Yakshi - Faithfully Yours (2012)
Vimala Raman	Oppam (2016)
Katrina Kaif	Malleshwari (2004) (Malayalam-dubbed film)
Sreedevi	English Vinglish (2012) (Malayalam-dubbed film)
Uma Shankari	Lakshmi (2005) (Malayalam Dubbed film)
Anushka Shetty	Arundhati (2009); Rudrama Devi (2018) (Malayalam-dubbed films)
Simran	Kannathil Muthamittal (2002) (Malayalam-dubbed film)
Vidya Balan	Kahaani (2012) (Malayalam-dubbed film)
Gowri Nandha	Kanyakumari Express (2010)
Vidhya Subramanian	Ponniyin Selvan: I (2022) Ponniyin Selvan: II (2023) (Malayalam-dubbed films)
Lakshmy Ramakrishnan	Kadhalikka Neramillai (2025) (Malayalam-dubbed film)

Film	Year	Dubbed for	Notes
Solo			
Aadupuliyattam	2016	Ramya Krishnan	
Aadyathe Kanmani	1995	Sudha Rani	
Aamayum Muyalum	2015	Sukanya; Ambika	
Aankiliyude Tharattu	1987	Revathy	
Aaru Sundarimaarude Katha	2013	Zarina Wahab	
Achaneyanenikkishtam	2001	Lakshmi Gopalaswamy	
Agni Sakshi	1999	Shobana	
Aakasha Gopuram	2008	Nithya Menen	
Alice in Wonderland	2005	Laya	
Ammakilikkoodu	2003	Saritha	
Anagha		Parvathy	
Anandabhadram	2005	Riya Sen	
Angene Oru Avadhikkalathu	1999	Samyuktha Varma	
Annakutty Kodambakkam Vilikkunnu		Sreeja	
Annoru Ravil	1986	Chitra	
Anuboothi	1997	Khushbu	
Aparadhi	1977	Master Raghu; Karan	
Appavum Veenjum	2015	Ramya Krishnan	
Aparichithan		Manya	
Aramana Veedum Anjoorekkarum		Shobana	
Ariyapedatha Rahasyam		Sadhana	
Aryan		Ramya Krishnan	
Athirathan		Geetha	
Azhakiya Ravanan		Bhanupriya	
Ayal Kadha Ezhuthukayanu		Nandini	
Ayalathe Addeham		Gauthami	
Aye Auto		Rekha	
Ayur Rekha		Lakshmi Sharma	
Baba Kalyani		Mamta Mohandas	
Balettan		Devayani	
Bali		...........	
Bangalore Days		Rekha	
Ben Johnson		Indraja	
Bharya		Urvashi	
Bhoopadathil Illatha Oridam		Rajasree Nair	
Black Butterfly		Sithara	
Body Guard		Nayantara	
Chanakya Soothrangal		Lissy	
Chandralekha		Pooja Batra	
Chandranudikkunna Dikhil		Samyuktha Varma	
Chandrolsavam		Meena	
Chathurangam		Nagma	
Chilambu		Shobana	
Chinthavishtayaya Shyamala		Sangeetha	Sangeetha won Kerala State Film Award for Best Actress
Chitram		Ranjini	
Chronic Bachelor	2003	Indraja	
CID Unnikrishnan B.A., B.Ed.		Rohini	
Classmates		Radhika	Radhika won Best Supporting Actress in Amrita Film Awards 2006
Commissioner		Shobana	
Cover Story		Tabu	
Currency		Seetha	
Deepam		Priya	
Devadoothan		Jayapradha	
Devasuram		Revathi	
Daivathinte Makan		Pooja Batra	
Dheem Tharikida Thom		Lissy	
Diamond Necklace		Rohini	
Dreams		Meena	
Dubai		Anjala Zaveri	
Innathe Chintha Vishayam		Sukanya	
Eakantham		Meera Vasudev	
Edavappathy	2016	Manisha Koirala	
Ente Sooryaputhrikku		Amala	Kerala State Film Award for Best Dubbing Artist
Friends		Meena	
Ganamela		Geetha Vijayan	
Gandharvam		Kanchan	
Gandhinagar Second Street		Karthika	
Godfather		Kanaka	
Golanthara Vartha		Kanaka	
Hello My Dear Wrong Number		Lissy	
Hitler		Vani Viswanath; Shobana	
Hitlist		Kanya	
Ilaneer		Shobana	
Indiriam		Lena; Geetha Nair; Vani Vishwanath	
India Gate		Vani Viswanath	
In Harihar Nagar		Geetha Vijayan	
Ishtam		Jayasudha	
Ithramatham		Swetha Menon	
Isra		Vindhya	
Ithu Nalla Thamasha		Anuradha	
Ivar Vivahitharayal		Rekha	
Evidam Swargamanu		Lakshmi Gopalaswamy	
Janmadharam		Ramya Krishnan	
January Oru Orma		Karthika	
Jeevante Jeevan		Aarti Gupta	
Journalist		Sithara	
Kaiyethum Doorath		Revathi	
Kakkakuyil	2001	Aarzoo Gowitrikar	
Kala Pani	1996	Tabu	
Kallipattam	1993	Urvashi	
Kalliyuungal		Shobana	
Kalyana Kacheri		Shobana	
Kaanaakkinaavu		Sukanya	
Kandu Kandarinju	1996	Nadia Moidu	
Kannaki		Nandita Das	
Kanyakumari Express		Gowri Nandha	
Kareelakattupole		Karthika	
Karumadikuttan		Nandini	
Karunyam		Divya Unni	
Kattodu Kathoram		Saritha	
Kazhcha		Padmapriya	
Kerala Cafe		Jyothirmayi, Swetha Menon	
Kilichundan Mampazham	2003	Soundarya	
Kilukkam		Revathi, Shyama	
Kochu Kochu Santhoshangal		Lakshmi Gopalaswamy	
Kochu Themmadi		Sunanda	
Kollilakam		Sumalatha	
Koodum Thedi		Nadia Moidu	
Kottaram Veetil Appukuttan		Shruti	
Krishna Pakshakkilikal		Revathi	
Kshamichu ennoru vakku		Shobana	
Kuberan		Samyuktha Varma	
Kukumacheppu		Shobana	
Kusruthikaatu		Kanaka	Kerala State Film Award for Best Dubbing Artist
Koritharicha Naal		Various	
Kudumbam Oru Swargam Bharya Oru Devatha		Jalaja	
Lakshmi	2007	Nayanthara	
Life Is Beautiful	2012	Samyuktha Varma	
Living Together	2011	Menaka	
Love 24x7	2015	Suhasini Maniratnam	
Madampi	2008	Kavya Madhavan	
Madamma		Archana	
Madhuranombarakattu	2000	Samyuktha Varma	Kerala State Film Award for Best Actress
Magic Lamp	2008	Meena	
Makaramanju	2011	Lakshmi Sharma	
Malayali Mamanu Vanakkam	2002	Roja	
Mambazhakkalam	2004	Shobana	
Mannar Mathai Speaking	1995	Vani Viswanath	
Manathe Vellitheru		Shobana	
Manichithrathazhu		Shobana	Only for Ganga's character (Nagavalli's voice was dubbed by Tamil dubbing artist Durga; Shobana won Kerala State Film Award for Best Actress and National Film Award for Best Actress.
Maniyanpilla Athava Maniyanpilla		Nithya	
Manjupoloru penkutty		Bhanupriya	
Mannadiar Penninu Chenkotta Checkan		Kanaka	
Manthri Kochamma		Kanaka	
Manushyamrugam		Kiran Rathod	
Mazhavil Kavadi		Urvashi	Urvashi won Kerala State Film Award for Best Actress
Mazhayethum Munpe		Shobana	
Meenakshi Kalyanam		Mohini	
Megasandesam		Rajasree Nair	
Megham		Priya Gill	
Meghamalhar		Samyuktha Varma	
Meleparambil Aanveedu		Shobana	
Midhunam		Urvashi	
Minnaminunginum Minnukettu		Shobana	
Minnaram		Shobana	
Moonu Masangalk munpe		Urvashi	
Mr bhramachari		Meena	
Mr Marumakan		Khushbu	
Mukunthetta Sumitra Vilikkunnu		Ranjini	
My DearMuthachann		Madhurima	
Nadan Pennum Natupramaniyum		Samyuktha Varma	
Nagaram		Lakshmi Sharma	
Naale Njagalude Vivaham		Menaka	
Nammal		Suhasini	
Nandanam		Revathi	
Naran		Devayani)	
Narasimham		Kanaka	
Narendran Makan Jayakanthan Vaka		Samyuktha Varma	
Neelagiri		Madhubala	
Neeyethra Dhanya		karthika	
Njan Salperu Ramankutty		Gayatri Jayaraman	
No. 1 Snehatheeram Bangalore North		Priya Raman	
Nokketha Doorathu Kannum Nattu		Nadia Moidu	
Notebook		Seetha	
Olympiyan Anthony Adam		Meena	
One man show		Samyuktha Varma, Manya	
Onningu Vannengil		Nadia Moidu	
Onnu Muthal Poojyam Vare		Asha jayaram	
Onnum Mindatha Bharya		Menaka	
Oraal		Shriya Reddy	
Oral Mathram		Shruti	
Ormakalundayirikanam		Sreeja	Kerala State Film Award for Best Dubbing Artist
Oru Indian Pranayakatha		Lakshmi Gopalaswamy	
Oru marubhomi kadha		Lakshmi Rai	
Oru Minnaminunginte Nurunguvettam		Parvathy	
Oru vadakan veeragadha		Madhavi	
Ottayal Pattalam		Madhu Bala	
Pachamarathanalil		Padmapriya	
Pakal		Jyothirmayi	
Pakal Nakshatrangal		Reena Bhasheer	
Pakalppooram		Geethu Mohandas	
Pakshe		Shobana	
Paleri Manikyam: Oru Pathirakolapathakathinte Katha (film)		Gowri Munjal	
Panchagni		Nadia Moidu	
Panthayakozhi		Geetha	
Pappayude Swantham Appoos		Sainu dadi (Seena Dadi)	
Parinayam		Mohini	
Pattalam		Tessa	
Pattente palazhy		Revathi	
Pavam Krooran		Kalaranjini	
Payyans		Rohini	
Penpattanam		Revathi	
Pidakkozhi Koovunna Noottandu		Urvashi	
Pingami		Kanaka	
Pramani		Sneha	
Putturam puthri unniyarcha		Vani Viswanath	
Puzhayozhugum Vazhi		Ambika	
Rajamanikyam		Sindhu Menon/ Padmapriya	
Rakkilippattu		Jyothika	Priyadarshan's 50th movie Remade into other languages.
ramaleela	2017	Radhika	
Ramji Rao Speaking		Rekha	
Raskshasa rajavu		Meena	
Rashtram		Laya	
Ravanaprabhu		Rajasree nair, Revathi	
Red chillies		Sana khan	
Rugmini		Lissy	
Sagar alias Jacky Reloaded		Shobana	
Sainyam		Priya Raman	
Saivar Thirumeni		Samyuktha Varma	
Salt Mango Tree	2015	Suhasini Maniratnam	
Salt n pepper		Shwetha Menon	Shweta won Kerala State Film Award for Best Actress
Samaantharangal		Renuka okk	
Sammohanam		Archana	
Samooham		Suhasini	
Santhanagopalam		Chippy	
Sarvakalashala		Lissy	
Savidham		Shari (actress)	
Sevenes		Nadia Moidu	
Sindoora Rekha		Shobana	
Solo	2017	Suhasini	
Spadikam		Urvashi	
Sradha	2000	Shobana	
Sufi Paranja Katha		Sharbani Mukherjee	
Superman		Shobana	
Shyama		Nadia Moidu	
Thalavattom		karthika	
Thalayana Manthram		Urvashi	
Thanmathra		Seetha	
Thenmavin Kombath		Shobana	
Thillana Thillana		Kaveri	
Thommanum Makkalum		Laya, Sindhu	
Thooval Kottaram		Sukanya	
Time		Padmapriya	
Ulladakkam	1991	Amala	Kerala State Film Award for Best Dubbing Artist
Uncle Bun	1991	Charmila; Sreeja; Rani (Raksha)	
Unnikale Oru Kadha Parayam	1987	Karthika	
Ustaad	1999	Indraja	
Utharam	1989	Heroine	
Vaadhyar	2012	Menaka	
Vadhu Doctoranu	1994	Nadia Moidu	
Vakkalathu Narayanankutty	2001	Manya	
Valliettan	2000	Shobana	
Valkannadi	2002	Geethu Mohandas	
Vandanam	1989	Girija Shettar	
Varaphalam	1994	Anju	
Varavelpu	1989	Revathi	
Vardhakya Puranam	1994	Kanaka	
Varnapakittu	1997	Meena	
Varnakkazhchakal	2000	Poornima Indrajith	
Veendum Chila Veettukaryangal	1999	Samyuktha Varma	
Venkalam	1993	Urvashi; Priyanka	
Vesham	2004	Sindhu Menon; Mohini	
Vettam	2004	Bhavna Pani	
Vietnam Colony	1992	Kanaka	
Vilapangalkkappuram	2008	Suhasini	
Vinodayathra	2007	Seetha	
Winter	2009	Bhavana	
Yathrakarude Sradhakku	2002	Soundarya	
Thenkasipattanam	2000	Samyuktha Varma; Geethu Mohandas	
Rajamanikyam	2005	Padmapriya Janakiraman; Sindhu Menon	
Thommanum Makkalum	2006	Laya; Sindhu Menon	
Vesham	2005	Mohini; Sindhu Menon	
One Man Show	2001	Samyuktha Varma; Mayana	
Udayon	2005	Laya; Sukanya	
Kshamichu Ennoru Vakku	1986	Shobhana; Urvashi	
Hitler	1996	Vani Viswanath; Shobana	
Kerala Cafe	2009	Jyothirmayi; Shwetha Menon; Dhanya Mary Varghese	
Twenty:20	2008	Sindhu Menon; Karthika Mathew	
Uncle Bun	1991	Charmila; Khushbu Sundar	
Venkalam	1994	Urvashi; Sonia	
Pakalppooram	2002	Geethu Mohandas; Kavitha Jose	
Soorya Kireedam	2007	Nithya Das; Remya Nambeesan	

=== Filmography as an actress ===
==== Malayalam ====
1. Manassu (1973)
2. Samudram (1977)
3. Madalasa (1978)
4. Surya Daham (1978)
5. Nivedyam (1978)
6. Padmatheertham (1978)
7. Chamaram (1980)
8. Manassinte Theerthayathra (1981)
9. Abhinayam (1981)
10. Ammakkorumma (1981)
11. Gaanam (1982)
12. Dheera (1982)
13. Mattuvin Chattangale (1982)
14. Swantham Enna Karuthi (1989)
15. Celluloid (2013)
16. Njan Samvidhanam Cheyyum (2015)
17. Pava (2016)
18. Oru Muthassi Gadha (2016) as Susaamma
19. Premanjali (2018)
20. Aniyan Kunjinum Thannalayathu (2019)
21. Madhuram Jeevitham (2021)
22. Aasha (2026)

==== Tamil ====
1. Adithya Varma (2019)

=== Dialogues or effects between songs ===
Year	Title	Film	Language	Composer	Co-artist	Dubbed for
1995	"Parumala Cheruvile"	Sphadikam	Malayalam	S P Venkitesh	K S Chitra	Uruvashi
1995	"Theeram thedum"	Vandanam	Malayalam	Ouseppachan	M G Sreekumar	Gireeja Shettar
1998	"Thanithangakinaponkal"	Friends	Malayalam	Ilayaraja	K J Yesudas and K S Chitra	Meena
1998	"Kuppivalakilukilungattey"	Ayal Kadhayezhuthunath	Malayalam	Raveendaran	Sujatha	Nandhini
2000	"Kannil Kashi Thumbikal"	Dreams	Malayalam	Gireesh Puthencherry	P. Jayachandran and Gayatri Asokan	Meena
2004	"Minna Minnuge Ninney"	Chathikkatha Chanthu	Malayalam	Gireesh Puthencherry	Dr Fahad Jyotsna and Rimi Tomy	Navya Nair
2006	"Ente khalbiley vennilavu"	Classmates	Malayalam	Alex Paul	Vineeth Sreenivasan and Sujatha	Radhika
2004	"Oru kathilola njan kandilla"	Vettam	Malayalam	Berney Ignatious	M G Sreekumar	Bhavana Pani
2010	"Enneyano"	Bodyguard	Malayalam	Anil Panachooran	M G Sreekumar, Biju Narayanan and Rimi Tomy	Nayanthara

=== Tamil movies dubbed ===
- Kilinjalgal - Dubbed for Poornima Rao (1981)

== Television ==
=== As a television presenter ===
- Manassiloru Mazhavillu seasons 1, 2 (Kairali TV)
- Selfie (Kairali TV)
- Fast Track
- Dream Drive
- Charithram Enniloode
- Chakkarapanathal (Autobiography of Shobhana)

=== Television shows as judge ===
- Tharolsavam 1, 2 (Kairali TV)
- Star Singer 2008 (Asianet)

=== Television shows as participant ===
- MY G Flowers Oru Kodi
- Bigg Boss (Malayalam season 3)
- Smart Show

=== Telefilm dubbed ===
- Miss Mary Therasa Paul — Dubbed for Beena Antony: (She won best actress telefilm in Kerala State Television Award (1996))
- Melapadam -Dubbed for Mini Nair (1996)
- Kilivathil-Dubbed for Ambika (1999)

=== Serials as dubbing artist ===
Year	Title	Dubbed for	Channel	Notes
2004	Kadamattath Kathanar	Thara Kalyan, Sukanya, Poornima Anand	Asianet	
2005	Adi Parasakthi	Sreeja Chandran	Surya TV	
2007	Nombarapoovu	Reshmi Soman	Asianet	
2008	Mandaram	Rekha	Kairali TV	
2010	Mattoruval	Vani Viswanath	Surya TV	
2010-2013	Akashadoothu	Chippy	Surya TV	
2012-2015	Kumkumapoovu	Asha Sharath	Asianet	
2019–2021	Koodathayi	Muktha	Flowers TV	
2022	Kaliveedu	Shanthi Krishna	Surya TV	
2023	Manimuthu	Lakshmi Gopalaswamy	Mazhavil Manorama	
2023	Mayamayooram	Shobana	Zee Keralam	Launch Promo
2023	Subhadram	Shobana	Zee Keralam	Launch Promo
2023	Seethayanam	Shobana	Zee Keralam	Launch Promo (Dropped Project)

=== Serials as actress ===
- Mangalyam (2023) as Adv.Radhika Raman
- Sukhamo Devi (2023–present) as Dr. Janaki

=== Ads ===
- Swayamvara Silks - Dubbed for Shobhana (2021)
