= Lion (2006 film) =

2006 Malayalam film directed by Joshiy

- VCD cover
- Directed by: Joshiy
- Written by: Udayakrishna-Siby K. Thomas
- Produced by: Noushad
- Starring: Dileep; Kalasala Babu; Kavya Madhavan; Vijayaraghavan
- Cinematography: P. Sukumar
- Edited by: Ranjan Abraham
- Music by: Songs: Deepak Dev; Score: Ouseppachan
- Production company: N. N. S Arts
- Distributed by: Shan Entertainment
- Release date: 28 January 2006
- Running time: 160 minutes
- Country: India
- Language: Malayalam

Lion is a 2006 Indian Malayalam-language action thriller film written by Udaykrishna-Sibi K. Thomas and directed by Joshiy. The film stars Dileep, Kalasala Babu, Kavya Madhavan and Vijayaraghavan alongside a supporting cast that include Jagathy Sreekumar, Innocent, Sai Kumar, Shammi Thilakan, Riyaz Khan and Karthika. The film was produced by Noushad and distributed by Shan Entertainment. The film received positive reviews and was a blockbuster at the box office. It was remade in Tamil as Nam Naadu (2007) with Karthika replaces Kavya as the female lead and in Telugu as Evadaithe Nakenti (2007).

== Plot ==
The film revolves round a socio-political family where Balagangadhara Menon, the Education Minister lives with his son Krishnakumar alias Unni, a politician, his wife Lakshmi, three daughters and two sons-in-law. Also with them is his P.A Joseph. Menon is always fond of his sons-in-law Pavithran and District Collector Gopinath and thinks that his son is a barrier to him as he tries to control their corrupt activities. Menon wants to become the Chief Minister himself by increasing college fees and throwing away the blame Avarachan, the present C.M since Avarachan was an honest politician. This causes major protests throughout the state, but the CM refuses to give in. Sharika alias Shari and her mother Devaki come to their place as she got a temporary school teacher post in the area. Both were servants in Menon's house long back, but was dispelled by him due to a childish love affair between Unni and Shari. Shari then involves in a public Drinking Water Case and seeks Menon for help. Finding that Menon is not reliable, she along with Unni goes to Collector's office but is again thrown back. Finally they move through Judicial ways and blocks the case.

Meanwhile, Unni's younger sister Meenakshi is in love with an ordinary school teacher Prasad and Unni tries to unite them. When Menon and others learn of this, they blindly refuse and want ASP Harshan to marry Meenakshi as a part of their socio-political assets. Pavithran sends his henchmen to kill Prasad, and keeps Unni in prison in an unwarranted case. Meenakshi is forcefully married to Harshan, and Unni is helpless. Later Unni is released. The next day, Shari gets a cellphone belonging to the murderer of Prasad and she with the help of Unni goes to CI Vijayan and submits the evidence. The murderer is arrested and subsequently Menon also, after being traced of a phone call from the former.

Menon decides to use this opportunity as a political game and blames the CM against this. Much irritated, the CM meets the Governor asking to dissolve the state assembly. The governor does so, and all MLAs including Menon are fired. The next general election is to be held soon and party initially decides to place Krishnakumar as candidate from his constituency instead of Menon. However, Menon convinces the party members to make him the candidate later. Krishnakumar is once again depressed, but his friends force him to contest as an Independent candidate, to which he agrees.

During the campaigning, Krishnakumar brings out the political dramas of his opponents and donates eradicatesoney he obtained from Vendor Chandy and other various businessmen as charity. Post election, Menon is surprised to find that Krishnakumar had won against him by a slight margin. Menon's party coalition wins seventy out of 140 seats and the opposition has 69. As Krishnakumar's support was required for the party to attain majority, he makes use of the situation by demanding the state Home Minister post. Even Menon supports this and the party council has no choice and they agree. Thomman Chakko becomes the next CM while Krishnakumar and others become members of his cabinet.

Krishnakumar makes use of his position in good ways and eradicates most of the corrupt evil activities in the state with the help of the Police force and his friends. He even chases down high politicians and brings out the black money they kept. He transfers Harshan to Bihar. Thomman Chakko is also blackmailed against his corrupt assets and has no choice than obeying Krishnakumar. Meanwhile, Krishnakumar convinces Shari to marry him, and both register their marriage soon. This irritates Menon and he dispels both of them from entering house. Later, Krishnakumar and Shari began to live happily in the Minister's official residence.

Pavithran in the meantime tries to eliminate Unni in several ways but fails. He tells Menon that Unni should be killed. Menon gets stuck up at this and finally decides to be a good man. He secretly meets Unni and Shari to apologise, and tells them to return home soon. He even decides to arrange a press meet to bring out all his corruptions. Pavithran finds that all his illegal wealth would be gone, and kills Menon using his henchmen depicting it as a lorry accident (by hitting the lorry with Menon's car). But unknown to him Menon's P.A. Joseph boards the car on which Menon travels for the press meet. Joseph survives the accident, and later reveals it to Krishnakumar. He tracks down the lorry drivers but it becomes a futile attempt. He is finally informed by Pavithran's wife Rashmi, who had overheard Pavithran's conversations to kill Menon. Pavithran decides to flee to Singapore but is confronted by Krishnakumar and the police. In a fight, Krishnakumar kills Pavithran using Vijayan's service revolver and awaits arrest. But everyone convinces him to forget the incident. Vijayan consoles him and convinces him that the state needs incorruptible and honest ministers like him.The police closes down the FIR under CRPC 130/131 security acts.

In the end Krishnakumar is seen congratulated by Ex. C.M Avarachan. Krishnakumar has now risen up not just as a politician and as the home minister of home affairs, but as a statesman and his mission continues by giving the message "Leadership is action and not position".

== Cast ==
- Dileep as B. Krishnakumar Menon "Unni", Minister of Home Affairs, Government of Kerala
  - Ashwin as Young Krishnakumar
- Kalasala Babu as Chandanakkattil Balagangadhara Menon, Unni's father and the former Education Minister of Kerala
- Sai Kumar as Pavithran Nambiar IPS , Menon's son-in-law and Unni's brother-in-law
- Vijayaraghavan as CI Vijayan, Krishnakumar's security team member
- Kavya Madhavan as Sharika "Shari", Unni's wife and a primary school teacher
  - Pallavi Narayan as Young Sharika
- Jagathy Sreekumar as Joseph Skaria, Menon's and Unni's PA
- Innocent as V. Thomman Chacko, the new Chief Minister of Kerala
- Shammi Thilakan as Collector L. Gopinath IAS
- Riyaz Khan as ASP Harshan Varma IPS
- Bheeman Raghu as DYSP Anantharaghavan, Krishnakumar's Security Team Member
- Santhosh as SI Prathapa Varma, Krishnakumar's security Team Member
- Madhupal as Siddarthan, Krishnakumar's friend
- Sreejith Ravi as Babychan, Krishnakumar's friend
- Saji Soman as Tharun, Krishnakumar's friend
- Bineesh Kodiyeri as Iqbal, Krishnakumar's friend
- Karthika Mathew as Meenakshi Harshan (Meenootty), Unni's younger sister
- Shobha Mohan as Lakshmi Menon, Unni's mother
- P. Sreekumar as P. K. Abraham/ Avarachan, Ex-Chief Minister of Kerala
- Cochin Haneefa as Vendor Chandy
- Salim Kumar as Pottakkuzhy Chellappan, Minister for Forests and Wildlife, Kerala
- Sudheer Sukumaran as Police Officer
- Bindu Panicker as Devaki, Shari's mother
- Saiju Kurup as Prasad, Meenakshi's lover
- Suvarna Mathew as Rashmi, Pavithran's wife & Unni's elder sister
- Lakshmi Priya as Shobha, Gopinath's wife & Unni's younger sister
- Kollam Thulasi as Minister Divakaran
- Poojapura Radhakrishnan as Minister
- T. P. Madhavan as Minister Kizhuppally Sudhakaran
- Idavela Babu as Thomman Chacko's and Abraham's P.A
- Jagannatha Varma as DGP
- Vishnu Prasad as Police Officer
- Harisree Ashokan as Kannan, Election Posterman
- Anil Murali as Vettoor Shivan
- Kozhikode Narayanan Nair as Narayanan, Prasad's father
- Ambika Mohan as Preethi, Prasad's mother
- Ponnamma Babu as Advocate Nancy Varghese, Public Prosecutor
- Kalabhavan Prajod as TV Reporter
- Nandu Pothuval as Journalist Ananthakumar
- Baburaj as Pavithran's spy
- Abraham Koshy as Minister
- Rani Larius as Minister
- Jolly Easow as Minister
- Bose Venkat as goon

== Production ==
The film was mainly shot in and around Trivandrum. Two songs from the film, Chirimani Mulle and Sundari Onnu Parayu, were filmed in New Zealand.

== Soundtrack ==
The music was by Deepak Dev and the lyrics were penned by Kaithapram Damodaran Namboothiri. The background music was scored by Ouseppachan.

Lion: Original Motion Picture Soundtrack
No.	Title	Singer(s)	Length
1.	"Chirimani Mulle"	Afsal, Jyotsna	4:50
2.	"Sundari Onnu Parayu"	Udit Narayan, Swetha Mohan	5:40
Total length:			10:30

== Box office ==
The film was a blockbuster at the box office and received positive reviews from the critics.
