= Ivar (2003 film) =

- Directed by: T. K. Rajeev Kumar
- Written by: T. K. Rajeev Kumar
- Produced by: Santhosh Damodharan
- Starring: Jayaram; Biju Menon; Bhavana; Vinayakan
- Cinematography: Madhu Neelakandan
- Edited by: Arun Kumar Aravind
- Music by: songs: Srinivas background score: Sharreth
- Production company: Damor Cinema
- Distributed by: Platinum Motion Pictures Pvt. Ltd
- Release date: 24 October 2003
- Running time: 159 minutes
- Country: India
- Language: Malayalam

Ivar is a 2003 Indian Malayalam-language action crime thriller film written and directed by T. K. Rajeev Kumar and produced by Santhosh Damodharan under the banner Damor Cinema. The film is loosely based on the Hong Kong crime thriller Infernal Affairs. Jayaram plays the protagonist and Biju Menon is the antagonist. The film also stars Bhavana, VinayakanM Siddique and Janardhanan. The film was mostly shot in Steadicam by the cinematographer of the film Madhu Neelakandan, and was edited by Arun Kumar Aravind.

== Plot ==
Ivar is an action movie about the underworld, goons, and the mafia. Pambu Jose is a dreaded underworld don, and his rival is Minnal Thankan. Jose's close aide is Ninja Hakkim and gun moll is Rita, along with the blind Vinayakan. Raghava Menon, a police officer infiltrates the gang and gains Jose's confidence like Hakkim. No one knows that Menon's goal is to wipe out the mafia.

Menon works in tandem with DGP S.K. Nair (Janardhanan) whose daughter, Nandini (Bhavana), is in love with Menon. Menon uses the underworld rivalry and gathers information on police informers and those on the take to create havoc in mafia camps.

== Cast ==
- Jayaram as City Police Commissioner Raghava Menon IPS
- Biju Menon as Paambu Jose
- Bhavana as Nandini
- Devi Ajith as Reetha
- Vinayakan as Vinayakan
- Anoop Menon as ASP Thomas IPS
- Siddique as SP Jacob Mathew IPS
- Janardhanan as DGP S.K. Nair IPS, Nandini's father
- Anil Murali as Hakkim, Jose's right hand and henchman
- Rizabawa as CommissionerPrem Kumar IPS
- P. Balachandran as Minnal Thankachan
- Sona Nair as Hakkim's wife
- Rajesh Hebbar as "Alambu" Rajan, Thankachan's henchmen
- Poornima Anand as Jose's wife
- Lishoy as Circle Inspector
- Kalasala Babu as Chief Minister
- J. Pallassery
- Ramu as Home Minister
