= Aalavattam (film) =

- Directed by: Raju Ambaran
- Written by: Nedumudi Venu, John Paul
- Produced by: Trinity International
- Starring: Nedumudi Venu, Innocent, Shanthi Krishna, Sreenivasan
- Cinematography: Ramachandra Babu
- Edited by: Venu
- Music by: Mohan Sithara
- Release date: 1993
- Country: India
- Language: Malayalam

Aalavattam is a 1993 Indian Malayalam film, directed by Raju Ambaran and starring Nedumudi Venu and Shanthi Krishna in the lead roles.

== Plot ==
Kesavankutty, known as Meppaattupurakkal Kesavankutty is very famous for his ancestors and their family status. They have been running the festivals in the temple for many years. His wife Urmila is a good housewife, caring about him and his family a lot. He has a mother and a sister Usha. They have a glass factory as an asset. Kesavankutty takes money for high interest and pays the expenses of the company and temple. Meanwhile, Usha gets a marriage proposal from a Doctor, Narayanankutty. Actually they approached on with the dream of dowry. Usha and Doctor gets close via calls and meets. After meeting the Doctor's family Kesavankutty finds them as very greedy. He tries to pull back Usha, but he fails. The Doctor convinces her that her brother is not willing because he doesn't wish to give money. He is very miserly.

At the same time in the company, the employees go for a strike, demanding a hike in salary and a bonus. And also the loan sharks, who gave money on interest harass him. This time his mother passes away. He feels alone in life. In the centre of all these tension, Usha goes to the Doctor's quarters. But she realises the real face of him. And gets off from there. Govindankutty, Balu and Harikrishnan, who were really close to Kesavankutty scolds her and brings her back to her home. And also they plan to get funds from expatriate friends of Balu as an investment in the factory for dividends and to help the factory's financial trouble. Thus all his problems are solved. The movie ends with the happy note of Urmila being pregnant and a happy Kesavankutty who yearned for child.

== Cast ==
- Nedumudi Venu as Meppaattupurakkal Keshavan Nair
- Shanthi Krishna as Urmila
- KPAC Lalitha as Savithri Amma
- Sukumari Malu amma
- Innocent as Vareeth
- Jose Pellissery as Kunju
- Prem Kumar as Govindankutty
- Sankaradi as Madhavan Maman
- Sreenivasan as Balu
- Ilavarasi as Usha
- Poojappura Ravi as Bhasi Pillai
- Shyama as Radha
- T. P. Madhavan as Manager Pappachan
- Devan as Dr. Narayanankutty
- Kollam Thulasi as Thankappan Pillai
- Thodupuzha Vasanthi as Bharathi

== Soundtrack ==
- "Rithu gaanam" - Anitha
- "Naamavum Roopavum" - S Janaki, Chorus
- "Peraarin Panineer" - KS Chithra Kaithapram
- "Mandana Chandrike" - G Venugopal Kaithapram
- "Paadaam Panimazhayaruliya" - G Venugopal
