= P. R. Shyamala =

Indian writer (1931–1990)

- Born: 4 July 1931; Thiruvananthapuram, Kerala, India
- Died: 21 July 1990 (aged 59); Kerala
- Occupations: Novelist, short story writer
- Spouse: Karoor Sasi
- Parents: Parameshwaran Pilla; M. Rajamma
- Writing career
- Genre: Fiction
- Notable works: Sararanthal; Thulasikathirukal; Sandhyakku Virinja Poovu; Makayiram Kayal

P. R. Shyamala (4 July 1931 – 21 July 1990) was an Indian novelist and short story writer of Malayalam literature. Known for novels such as Sararanthal and Makayiram Kayal and short stories compiled in Harishri and Ariyapedatha Peedanangal, she was a member of the Sahitya Pravartaka Sahakarana Sanghom, the general council of the Kerala Sahitya Akademi and the advisory board of the Central Board of Film Certification. Three of her stories have been adapted into films and Sararanthal was an award winning television series made in 1991, based on her novel of the same name.

== Biography ==
P. R. Shyamala was born on 4 July 1931 in Thiruvananthapuram in the south Indian state of Kerala to Attara Parameshwaran Pilla, a justice and music scholar and his wife, Madhavavilasam Rajamma. After schooling at Holy Angel's Convent Trivandrum, she completed graduated in music from the Government College for Women, Thiruvananthapuram. The first of her stories was published in Kaumudi weekly and later she published her first novel, Yathrayil Maranna Patheyam in 1955. Later, when her novel, Durgam was serialised in Sindooram weekly, she got the opportunity to get acquainted with Karoor Sasi, the editor of the weekly, which led to their marriage in 1968.

Considered among the modern novelists, and short story writers of Malayalam, Shyamala authored around 35 novels and five short story anthologies. She was known to have portrayed human relationships and the angst of oppressed women in her writings. Her entry into films was in 1973 with Bhadradeepam, directed by M. Krishnan Nair for which she wrote the story. Two more of her stories were adapted into films later, viz. Manassinte Theerthayathra and Sandhyakku Virinja Poovu. Her novel, Sararanthal, was made into a television series in 1991 and it won a number of awards including the Kerala State Television Awards for best series, best direction and best screenplay.

Shyamala, who had fascination for gardening and home decor, was a member of the Sahitya Pravartaka Sahakarana Sanghom and she sat in the general council of the Kerala Sahitya Akademi. In 1990, she was selected to be a member of the advisory board of the Central Board of Film Certification and she died on 21 July 1990, at the age of 59, which was the day her selection to the Film Censor Board was announced.

== Selected bibliography ==
=== Novel ===
- Shyamala, P. R. (1980). Nirayum Puthariyum. Kottayam: SPCS. ISBN 9788126450718. OCLC 892512223.
- Shyamala, P. R. (1980). Makayiram Kayal. Kottayam: MMC Books. ISBN 9788126422029.
- Shyamala, P. R. (2001). Kavadiyattom. DC Books. Archived from the original on 16 January 2005.
- Shyamala, P. R. (1988). Nakshathrangalude paattu. Thiruvananthapuram: Prabhath Book House.
- Shyamala, P. R. (1991). Chandraayanam. Kottayam: S.P.C.S.
- Shyamala, P. R. (1971). Jwalayil oru panineerkkattu (in Malayalam). Thrissur: Current Books.
- Shyamala, P. R. (1972). Muthukkuda (in Malayalam). Thrissur: Current Books.
- Shyamala, P. R. (1965). Sandhya (in Malayalam). Thiruvananthapuram: Prabhath Book House.
- Syamala, P. R. (1971). Durgam / (in Malayalam). Thrissur: Current Books.
- Shyamala, P. R. (1982). Manal (in Malayalam). Kozhikode: Poorna Publications.
- Shyamala, P. R. (1982). Daivathil Viswasikkunnavar (in Malayalam). Kottayam: National Book Stall.
- Shyamala, P.R. (1983). Lasyasandyakal (in Malayalam). Kottayam: National Book Stall.
- Shyamala, P. R. (1985). Avan avante nizhal (in Malayalam). Vijayodaya Publications.
- Shyamala, P. R. (1985). Samandharam (in Malayalam). Kottayam: National Book Stall.
- Shyamala, P. R. (1970). Shararanthal (in Malayalam). Konni: Venus Press & Book Depot.
- Shyamala, P. R. (1976). Manassinte theerthayathra (in Malayalam). Thiruvananthapuram: Prabhath Book House.
- Shyamala, P. R. (1984). Sandhyaykku virinja poovu (in Malayalam). Kottayam: National Book Stall.
- Shyamala, P. R. (1988). Ardhaviramam (in Malayalam).
- Shyamala, P. R. (1991). Nilkoo Oru Nimisham (in Malayalam). Thiruvananthapuram: Prabhath Book House.
- Shyamala, P. R. (1974). Ee Vazhithirivil (in Malayalam). Thiruvananthapuram: Deshabandhu.
- Shyamala, P. R. (1987). Valmeekam (in Malayalam). Thiruvananthapuram: Akshaya Books.
- Shyamala, P. R. (1995). Shyamaranyam (in Malayalam). Kozhikode: Poorna Publications.
- Shyamala, P. R. (2001). Kavadiyattam (in Malayalam). Kottayam: DC Books.

=== Short story ===
- Shyamala, P. R. (2000). Suvarnavalliyude Sankeerthanam. Prabhath Book House.
- Shyamala, P. R. (1999). Katha - Shyamala (in Malayalam). Kottayam: Sahithya Pravarthaka Sahakarana Sankham.
- Shyamala, P. R. (1973). Harishri (in Malayalam). Konni: Venus Press & Book Depot.

== Filmography ==
- Bhadradeepam (1973)
- Manassinte Theerthayathra (1981)
- Sandhyakku Virinja Poovu (1983)

== See also ==
- List of Malayalam-language authors by category
- List of Malayalam-language authors
