= Bhadradeepam =

- Directed by: M. Krishnan Nair
- Written by: M. Krishnan Nair (screenplay); S. L. Puram Sadanandan (dialogues)
- Based on: Durgam by P. R. Shyamala
- Produced by: Sharada; T. Sathyadevi
- Starring: Prem Nazir; Sharada; Sujatha
- Cinematography: S. J. Thomas
- Edited by: V. P. Krishnan
- Music by: M. S. Baburaj
- Production company: Sree Saradasathya Combines
- Distributed by: Sree Saradasathya Combines
- Release date: 2 March 1973
- Country: India
- Language: Malayalam

Bhadradeepam is a 1973 Indian Malayalam film, directed by M. Krishnan Nair and produced by Sharada and T. Sathyadevi. The film stars Prem Nazir, Sharada and Sujatha in the lead roles. The film has a musical score by M. S. Baburaj. The film was a commercial success.

== Plot ==
Rajasekharan, a wealthy businessman, and his wife Usha lead a happy life. One day Usha dies and Rajasekharan suspects she was poisoned by her close friend Rajani. In order to take revenge, he marries Rajani and forces upon her a bleak life devoid of all pleasure. Eventually Rajasekharan discovers that Rajani had nothing to do with Usha's death, but it is too late by then.

== Cast ==
- Prem Nazir as Rajasekjaran
- Sharada as Rajani (dubbed by KPAC Lalitha)
- Sujatha as Usha
- Jose Prakash as Venu, the Doctor
- Adoor Bhasi as Devarajan Potty and Unni Swamy
- T. R. Omana as Lakshmikutty Amma
- T. S. Muthaiah as Usha's father
- K. P. Ummer as Prakash, the Manager
- Philomina as Rajani's mother
- Vincent as Mohan, Usha's brother
- Shoba as Lekha, Rajani's sister
- M. L. Saraswathi as Amminikutty, Lakshmikutty Amma's daughter
- Khadeeja as Brothel lady (guest appearance)

== Soundtrack ==
The music was composed by M. S. Baburaj and the lyrics were written by Vayalar Ramavarma and K. Jayakumar.

No.	Song	Singers	Lyrics	Length (m:ss)
1	"Deepaaradhana Nada"	K. J. Yesudas	Vayalar Ramavarma	
2	"Kaalindi Thadathile Radha"	S. Janaki	Vayalar Ramavarma	
3	"Kannukal Karinkoovala"	S. Janaki	Vayalar Ramavarma	
4	"Mandaaramanamulla Kaatte"	K. J. Yesudas	K Jayakumar	
5	"Vajrakundalam Manikkaathil Aniyum"	P. Jayachandran, B. Vasantha	Vayalar Ramavarma	
