= Manassinte Theerthayathra =

Manssinte Theerdha Yathra
- Directed by: Thamban
- Written by: P. R. Shyamala; Kallikkadu Ramachandran (dialogues)
- Screenplay by: Kallikkadu Ramachandran
- Starring: Shubha; Sukumaran; M. G. Soman; Jagathy Sreekumar
- Cinematography: Vipin Das
- Music by: M. B. Sreenivasan
- Production company: Christ King Creations
- Distributed by: Christ King Creations
- Release date: 2 October 1981
- Country: India
- Language: Malayalam

Manssinte Theerdha Yathra is a 1981 Indian Malayalam film, directed by Thamban. The film stars Shubha, Sukumaran, M. G. Soman and Jagathy Sreekumar in the lead roles. The film has musical score by M. B. Sreenivasan.

== Cast ==
- Shubha as Arundathi
- Sukumaran as Kamal
- M. G. Soman as Aravindan
- Jagathy Sreekumar as Arjunan
- Aranmula Ponnamma as Muthassi
- Bhagyalakshmi as Seetha ( Maid Servant)
- Renu Chandra as Renjitha
- G. K. Pillai as Raghunathan
- Nanditha Bose as Dakshyayani
- T. P. Madhavan as Thomas Mathew
- Sreenivasan as Ravi

== Soundtrack ==
The music was composed by M. B. Sreenivasan and the lyrics were written by O. N. V. Kurup.

No.	Song	Singers	Lyrics	Length (m:ss)
1	"Iru Kalithozharaay"	K. J. Yesudas	O. N. V. Kurup	
2	"Nadannum Nadannere" (Manthram Pole)	K. J. Yesudas	O. N. V. Kurup	
3	"Neeyetho Mounasangeetham"	S. Janaki	O. N. V. Kurup	
4	"Nishaakudeeram"	S. Janaki	O. N. V. Kurup	
