= Yaathrayude Anthyam =

Yaathrayude Anthyam (Journey Ends)
- Directed by: K. G. George
- Written by: K. G. George
- Screenplay by: K. G. George; John Samuel
- Story by: Parappurath
- Based on: Kottayam Mananthavady, a short story by Parappurath
- Produced by: Doordarshan
- Starring: Murali; M.G. Soman; Annamma Abraham; Karamana Janardanan Nair
- Narrated by: Murali
- Cinematography: Venu; Sunny Joseph
- Edited by: Rajasekharan
- Music by: M.G. Radhakrishnan
- Production company: Doordarshan
- Release date: 1989
- Country: India
- Language: Malayalam

Yaathrayude Anthyam is a 1989 Malayalam-language television film co-written and directed by K. G. George for Doordarshan. The film stars Murali as a reputed writer. The film depicts his intellectual and emotional relationship with an intellectual (M.G. Soman) who leads the life of a simple farmer in a remote village, and his worries about his widowed daughter (Annamma Abraham) who has a five-year-old girl child.The story is entirely based on these relationships. The story unfolds through the writer's bus journey to visit him. This film was never released in theaters. The film is based on the short story, "Kottayam Manathavadi", by Parappurath.

== Plot ==
VKV sets out for an overnight journey to meet his friend Abraham following the receipt of a telegram from Abraham's side. Perplexed on why such a telegram was sent instead of a letter, VKV recounts their relationship and how they inspired each other, throughout the journey. The journey focuses on the lives of fellow travelers also. An NRI in the bus, a wedding party etc. At the fag end of the journey, VKV sees the man sitting next to him, bride's father die. VKV reaches his destination only to find Abraham's dead body. Abraham's daughter tells VKV that her father was waiting for him on his dead bed and said VKV would be travelling in bus and will see him die while travelling. VKV gets shocked. Abraham in one of their old discussions had said life is a repetition of the set of same images, though the characters essentially only the people change.

== Cast ==
- Murali as Writer VKV
- M.G. Soman as Abraham
- Karamana Janardhanan Nair as Kariyachan
- Annamma Abraham as Abraham's daughter Susanna
- Asha Jayaram as Molly
- Shyama as Molykutty's sister
- Aliyar as Man in the bus
- Kaveri as Child in the bus

== Critical response ==
For plumeriamovies, Arjun Anand wrote, Yaathrayude Anthyam is the simplest film of the writer, it almost feels like a stretched out slice-of-life episode. But the filmmaking is quietly engaging. Death is a very melodramatic subject. If his contemporaries, Padmarajan in his Moonnam Pakkam, Lohithadas in Bharatham or Dennis Joseph in Akashadoothu among others, treated death and grief with melodrama and exuberant poignance, KG George's take on the subject―just like any other work of his―is subdued, objective and intellectual. The profoundness in his writing is not literary like MT/Lohi, it's rather rational.
