= Jagannatha Varma =

Indian actor (1939–2016)

K. N. Jagannatha Varma
- Born: 1 May 1939; Cherthala, Kingdom of Travancore, British India (present day Alappuzha, Kerala, India)
- Died: 20 December 2016 (aged 77); Thiruvananthapuram, Kerala, India
- Occupations: Police officer; Actor; Kathakali artist

K. N. Jagannatha Varma (1 May 1939 – 20 December 2016) was an Indian actor who worked in Malayalam film and television industry. He was also a Kathakali artist. His son Manu Varma is also an artist and his son-in-law Viji Thampi is a film director. He acted in a number of Malayalam movies performing roles of a senior police officer, judge or a priest. Some of his noted roles were in the movies New Delhi (1987), Thanthram (1988), Lelam (1997) and Pathram (1999), all directed by Joshiy. Varma joined the Kerala Police Force in 1963, before becoming active in movies. He retired from the Kerala Police as a Superintendent of Police.

== Family ==
He was born as the third of five children to Thekkedathu Kovilakam Kerala Varma Thampuran and Kattunkal Kovilakam Ambalika at Varanad, Cherthala, Alappuzha, Kerala. Director Viji Thampi is his son-in-law.

His last film was Dolls, released in 2013. His last TV serial was Mangalyapattu, which was being aired in Mazhavil Manorama channel at the time of his death. He was cremated with full state honours at his family crematorium in Cherthala.

== Filmography ==
=== 1970s ===
Year	Title	Role	Notes
1978	Maattoly	Judge	
1978	Aalmaaraattam		
1979	Nakshathrangale Sakshi		
1979	Kannukal	Menon	

=== 1980s ===
Year	Title	Role	Notes
1980	Anthappuram	Balakrishna Pillai	
1980	Prakriti Manohari	Achuthan Pilla	
1980	Chaakara	Police Officer	
1981	Asthamikkatha Pakalukal	Psychiatrist	
1981	Swarnappakshikal		
1981	Swarangal Swapnagal	Dr. Mohan	
1981	Arayannam	Sekharan	
1981	Raktham	George	
1982	Amritha Geetham		
1982	Thuranna Jail	Venukuttan	
1982	Kakka		
1982	Saravarsham	Ramakrishnan Nair	
1982	Kelkkaatha Sabdham	Babu's father	
1983	Rugma	Narayana Menon	
1983	Mortuary	College Principal	
1983	Marakkillorikkalum	Kesavan Nampoothiri	
1983	Pallankuzhi	Karthavu	
1984	Oru Sumangaliyude Kadha	Doctor	
1984	Krishna Guruvayoorappa	Kunju Nair	
1984	Kurishuyudham	D.I.G	
1984	Unaroo	Bharathan	
1984	Paavam Krooran		
1984	Ethirppukal	Bhargavan Pilla	
1984	Swarna Gopuram	Mercy's father	
1984	Thirakal	Thomas George	
1984	Sreekrishna Parunthu	Padmanabhan Thampi (Pappu)	
1985	Rangam	Karunakara Panikker Ashan	
1985	Avidathe Pole Ivideyum		
1985	Oru Naal Innoru Naal		
1985	Idanilangal		
1985	Vasantha Sena	Alfred	
1985	Anubandham	Bhaskaran's father	
1985	Ee Sabdam Innathe Sabdam	Police Officer	
1985	Ayanam	Alice's father	
1985	Karimpinpoovinakkare	Advocate	
1986	Musafir		Hindi film
1986	Nakhakshathangal	Adv. Bhaskaran Nair	
1986	Yuvajanotsavam	SP Dharmapalan	
1986	Shobhraj		
1986	Ambili Ammavan		
1986	Koodanayum Kattu		
1986	Nimishangal	Rajapadmanabhan Thampi	
1986	Sughamo Devi	Devi's father	
1986	Nandi Veendum Varika		
1986	Aavanazhi	Kumar	
1987	Kaiyethum Doorathu	Chandra Shekhara Kuruppu	
1987	Varshangal Poyathariyathe	Doctor	
1987	Theekattu	Radha's father	
1987	Ajantha		
1987	Athinumappuram		
1987	Aalippazhangal		
1987	Naalkavala	Ravunni Kurup	
1987	Vrutham	Subrahmanya Iyer	
1987	Manja Manthrangal	Gladia's father	
1987	Achuvettante Veedu	Varma	
1987	Adimakal Udamakal	R. K. Shenoy	
1987	New Delhi	C. R. Panikkar	
1988	Aranyakam	Madhavan Nair	
1988	Dhinarathrangal	Madhava Menon's brother-in-law	
1988	Oru CBI Diary Kurippu	S. P	
1988	Aalilakkuruvikal		
1988	Ormayil Ennum		
1988	1921	Kunjikuttan Thamburan	
1988	Marikkunnilla Njaan		
1988	Thanthram	Kurien Joseph	
1988	Mukthi	Viswanathan Nair	
1989	Naduvazhikal	Dy.S.P. Pavithran	
1989	Adharvam	Moothedan	
1989	Adhipan	Dr. K S Menon	
1989	Aksharathettu		
1989	Artham	Warrier	
1989	Jagratha		
1989	Jeevitham Oru Raagam		
1989	Antharjanam	Thirumeni	
1989	Annakutty Kodambakkam Vilikkunnu	C V Chandran	
1989	Kaalal Pada	Bhargavan Menon	
1989	Kodungallur Bagavathi		
1989	Nair Saab		
1989	Anagha	Raghavan Nair	
1989	Mrugaya	Philipose Muthalali	

=== 1990s ===
Year	Title	Role	Notes
1990	Nammude Naadu	DGP	
1990	Veena Meettiya Vilangukal		
1990	Randam Varavu	Judge	
1990	Varthamana Kalam	Arundathi's father	
1990	Kattukuthira		
1990	Ee Kanni Koodi	Police Officer	
1990	Arhatha	C. K. Ramakrishnan	
1990	No.20 Madras Mail	Kurishingal Kariachan	
1990	Maanmizhiyaal		
1990	Naale Ennundengil		
1990	Kottayam Kunjachan	B. Ramanatha Reddiar	
1990	Midhya	Krishna Kurup	
1990	Mathilukal		
1990	Samrajyam	K. M. Shah	
1990	Kuttettan	Narayanan	
1990	Ee Thanutha Veluppan Kalathu	I.G Gopinathan I.P.S	
1991	Venal Kinavukal	Krishna Kurup	
1991	Chakravarthy	Augustine Joseph	
1991	Souhrudam		
1991	Nagarathil Samsara Vishayam	Achutha Menon	
1991	Nattuvishesham	Madhava Menon	
1991	Aanaval Mothiram	IG Karthikeyan IPS	
1991	Ganamela	Venu's uncle	
1991	Chanchattam	Company M. D.	
1991	Bhoomika	Superintendent of Police	
1991	Advaitham	Sreedharan	
1991	Neelagiri	CI Harindra Varma	
1992	Yoddha	Raghava Menon	
1992	Thalastaanam	College Principal	
1992	Sooryachakram		
1992	Kingini	Valiya Thirumeni	
1992	Mahanagaram		
1992	Sabarimalayil Thanka Sooryodayam		
1992	Radhachakram		
1992	Kunukkitta Kozhi	Office Staff	
1992	Kizhakkan Pathrose		
1992	Sargam	Maash	
1992	Pandu Pandoru Rajakumari	Thampuran	
1993	Vietnam Colony	Company MD	
1993	City Police	C.M. Vasudeva Panikar	
1993	Airport		
1993	Journalist	Kaimal	
1993	Janam	Commissioner Fernandez	
1993	Devasuram	Adiyodi	
1993	Aagneyam	IG	
1994	Bhaarya		
1994	Parinayam	Palakkunnam	
1994	Moonnilonnu		
1994	Kambolam	Narayana Iyyer	
1994	Chief Minister K. R. Gowthami		
1995	Boxer	Madhavan Nair	
1996	Rajaputhran	Chief Minister	
1996	Kireedamillaatha Raajakkanmaar	Caltran Nicholas	
1996	19 April		
1996	Sallapam	Prabhakara Varma	
1996	Moonilonnu	Nambyar	
1996	Kaliveedu	Menon	
1996	The Prince	Guru Murthy Shasthri	
1996	Kathapurushan	Kunjunni's father	
1997	Itha Oru Snehagatha		
1997	Poomarathanalil		
1997	Lelam	Bishop	
1997	Snehadooth		
1997	Aaraam Thampuran	Cheriyachhan	
1998	Poothiruvathira Raavil		
1998	Mayilpeelikkavu		
1999	Vazhunnor	Kuriakose	
1999	Udayapuram Sulthan	Thirumangalathu Nampoothiri	
1999	Pathram	Pattathil Outhakkutty	
1999	Panchapandavar	Thirumeni	
1999	Pattabhishekam	Valiya Thampuran	
1999	Ezhupunna Tharakan	Priest	
1999	Crime File	Bishop Punnassery	

=== 2000s ===
Year	Title	Role	Notes
2000	Mark Antony	Bishop	
2000	Unnimaaya		
2000	Narashimham	Justice Pillai	
2000	The Warrant	IG	
2001	Jeevan Masai		
2001	Laya Thaalangal		
2001	Sraavu		
2001	Naranathu Thampuran	Harikrishnan	
2001	Swargavaathil		
2001	Praja	Mannel Mamachan	
2002	Njan Rajavu		
2002	The Gift of God		
2002	Pakalppooram		
2002	Nandanam	Ambalappattil Madhava Menon	
2003	Soudaamini		
2003	Mr. Brahmachari	Krishnaswamy	
2004	Udayam		
2005	Deepangal Sakshi	M. K. Menon	
2006	Highway Police	Chandrasekharan Mashu	
2006	Ashwaroodan	Mankoyyikkal Vasukuruppu	
2006	Lion	DGP	
2006	Chess	D.I.G Bharathan Kurup	
2006	Bada Dosth	I.G.	
2007	Ayur Rekha	Adv. G.K. Nambiyar	
2007	Detective	Fr. Gabriel	
2007	Inspector Garud	Police officer	
2008	Novel	Vishwanatha Menon	
2008	Twenty:20	Judge	
2008	College Kumaran	Judge Pillai	
2009	Pathaam Adhyaayam		
2009	Red Chillies	Sasthri	

=== 2010s ===
Year	Title	Role	Notes
2010	Thanthonni	Fr. Stephen Chandy	
2010	Kausthubham		
2010	Rhythm		
2010	Ringtone		
2010	Aakaasha Yathra		
2011	Christian Brothers	Bishop	
2011	Happy Durbar		
2012	Asuravithu		
2013	Rebecca Uthup Kizhakkemala	Bishop	
2013	Dolls		
2015	Kidney Biriyani		
2016	Pa Va	Bishop	

== Television ==
Aired on	Program	Channel	Notes
1996	Kairali Vilasam Lodge	Doordarshan	
2000	Jwalayayi	Doordarshan	
	Manasi	Doordarshan	
2003	Kudumbini	Asianet	
2004	Sthree oru Santhvanam		
2005	Kadamattathu Kathanar		
2007	Swami ayyappan		
2008	Hello Kuttichathan		
2008	Devimahathmyam	Asianet	
2008	Snehathooval		
2010	Ponnum poovum	Amrita TV	
2010	Indharaneelam	Surya TV	
2014	Sooryakalady	Amrita tv	
2015-2016	Aathira	Sun TV	Tamil serial
2016-2017	Mangalyapattu	Mazhavil manorama	last serial
