= Santhosh Damodharan =

Indian film producer

- Born: 17 February 1965 (age 60)
- Occupations: Film producer; distributor; actor
- Years active: 2002 – present
- Spouse: Ar. Rajashree Santhosh
- Children: 2

Santhosh Damodharan is an Indian film producer, distributor and actor who predominantly works in the Malayalam film industry. He owns the production house Damor Cinema. He is best known for producing Pakalppooram (2002), Chandrolsavam (2005), and Kurukshetra (2008). Damodharan made his acting debut as the lead antagonist in Krishnankutty Pani Thudangi (2021).

== Filmography ==
=== As producer ===
Year	Title	Notes	Ref.
2002	Pakalppooram		
2002	Valkannadi		
2003	Ivar		
2005	Chandrolsavam		
2006	Lanka		
2008	Kurukshetra		
2010	April Fool		
2010	Oru Naal Varum	Distribution only	
2010	Moheli Gaav	Hindi film	
2014	@Andheri		
2021	Wolf		

=== As an actor ===
- Kurukshetra (2008)
- Krishnankutty Pani Thudangi (2021)
