= Shyama (Malayalam actress) =

Indian actress

- Born: 1971
- Died: 1996 (aged 24–25)
- Occupation: Actress
- Years active: 1986–1993

Shyama was an Indian actress of Malayalam movies. She was one of the prominent lead and supporting actress of Malayalam and Tamil movies during 1990s. She came into movie industry as a child artist and later started doing lead roles and supporting roles.

== Death ==
She died of a gas cylinder explosion at her home in 1996. She was a distant relative of Parvathy Jayaram.

== Filmography ==
Year	Film	Role	Notes
1981	Sanchari	Young Sumam	child artist
1986	Pranaamam	Indu	
1986	Nilakurinhi Poothappol	Sindhu	
1987	Idanazhiyil Oru Kaloocha		
1987	Kayyethum Doorath		
1988	Kudumba Puranam	Indu	
1988	Paadamudra	Pandaram's wife	
1988	Moonnam Mura	Bharathan Menon's daughter	
1988	Ponmuttayidunna Tharavu	Savithri	
1988	Oohakachavadam	Amina	
1988	Isabella	Servant	
1988	Samvalsarangal		
1989	Innale	School Teacher	
1990	His Highness Abdullah	Soudamini Varma	
1990	Superstar	Madanraj's wife	
1990	Kuttettan	Ragini	
1990	No.20 Madras Mail	Mollykutty	
1990	Arhatha	Devan's sister	
1990	May Dinam	Omana	
1990	Aey Auto	Raji	
1991	Vishnulokam	Vilasini's daughter	
1991	Kilukkam	Justice Pillai's daughter	
1991	Vasthuhara	Shantha	
1991	Kilukkampetti	Anu's friend	
1991	Ulladakkam	Nurse	
1991	Yamanam	-	
1991	Thudar Katha	Girl in college tour bus	
1991	Oru Yaathrayude Anthyam	Molykutty's sister	
1991	Keli	Hema	
1992	Utsavamelam	Shalini	
1992	Rajashilpi	Revathy	
1992	Pappayude Swantham Appoos	Cameo in Song Kakka Poocha	
1992	Grihaprevesam	Sudha	
1992	Ponnurukkum Pakshi	Sujatha	
1992	Oru Kochu Bhoomikilukkam	Thankamani	
1993	Ammayane Sathyam	Jaganatha Varma's wife	
1993	Aalavattam	Radha	
1993	Ponnu Chami		
1994	Sukham Sukhakaram /Ipadikku Kaadhal(Malayalam/Tamil)	Roslin	
1994	Gothram	Chithra	
