= Sandhyakku Virinja Poovu =

- DVD Cover
- Directed by: P. G. Viswambharan
- Screenplay by: Thoppil Bhasi
- Story by: P. R. Shyamala
- Based on: Sandhyakku Virinja Poovu by P. R. Shyamala
- Produced by: Raju Mathew
- Starring: Mammootty; Shankar; Seema; Mohanlal; Uma Bharani; Adoor Bhasi
- Cinematography: Ramachandra Babu
- Edited by: G. Venkitaraman
- Music by: Ilaiyaraaja
- Production company: Century Films
- Distributed by: Century Release
- Release date: 11 February 1983
- Country: India
- Language: Malayalam

Sandhyakku Virinja Poovu (transl. Flower that bloomed at twilight) is a 1983 Indian Malayalam-language drama film written by Thoppil Bhasi and directed by P. G. Viswambharan. It is based on the 1980 novel of the same name by P. R. Shyamala. The film features Mammootty, Shankar, Seema, Mohanlal, Prathapachandran and Adoor Bhasi in major roles. The film did well commercially.

== Cast ==
- Mammootty as Advocate Jayamohan
- Shankar as Thilakan
- Seema as Dr. Baladevi
- Mohanlal as Ramu
- Adoor Bhasi as Panikkarammavan
- Uma Bharani as Subhashini
- Ambika as Priya
- Prathapachandran as Nambiar
- Sukumari as Jayamohan's mother
- Y. Vijaya as Sumitra friend of Baladevi
- V. D. Rajappan as a Sumitra's husband and common friend of Jayamohan and Baladevi

== Plot ==
Mammootty as Advocate Jayamohan comes to Dr Baladevi's (Seema) office to organize an abortion for a young woman. Dr Baladevi then sees Adv Jayamohan at mutual friend's party. Both encounters leave her feeling uncomfortable with his apparent lack of morals and scruples.

Because her brother Thilakan (Shankar) does not turn up for the party, she ends up getting a lift home from Jayamohan. The next morning Thilakan exults at getting an engineering scholarship to go to the US but their uncle, Panikkarammavan (Adoor Bhasi), reminds him that would mean leaving his sister alone since their parents were deceased.

Thilakan and Baladevi visit Nambiar (Prathapachandran) and his daughter, their childhood friend, Priya (Ambika) who recently lost the use of her right hand in a bus accident. They are concerned about her marriage prospects. Baladevi misunderstood Thilakan's words of encouragement as him having an interest in Priya and this make her happy as she is aware that Priya likes Thilakan. She promises Priya that she will organise their marriage. But Thilakan tells her that he's already in love with another young woman, Subhashini (Uma Bharani).

Baladevi attends to Jayamohan's mother (Sukumari) who is not well, and she expresses her stress at her son's poor behavior.

She then goes to meet Subhashini at her house where she also meets Ramu (Mohanlal) who comes across as a bit uncouth. She organises to meet Subhashini at a park but Jayamohan is there and Subhashini is not able to come because her father is unwell. Baladevi makes it clear to Jayamohan that she does not like him.

Subhashini visits Baladevi and Ramu turns up and behaves in an uncouth manner.

The next day Baladevi goes to visit Priya and Nambiar. She has great memories of growing up at their home there. She has the difficult job of breaking the bad news to Priya that Thilakan is in love with another. Priya accepts the bad news with grace.

On the train back Baladevi meets one of her patient mothers whom she assisted with her pregnancy. She asks how the child is. The mother says the child is with her grandmother because she has to work. She mentions that the wealthy father abandoned her and that due to Adv Jayamohan court proceedings for support were unsuccessful.

Subhashini comes to Baladevi and tells her that she needs an abortion because she was 3 months pregnant due to being raped. At first Baladevi does not wish to perform the procedure but she later agrees. Unfortunately Subhashini died during the procedure. The family, including Ramu, insist that a postmortem should not be conducted so that they can take her body.

The next day an inflammatory article appears in a newspaper. Ramu comes to her home repeatedly to extort money from Baladevi. On one occasion, Jayamohan turns up and beats up Ramu. He lets Baladevi know that a murder charge is being prepared against her. He organises bail for her when the Police turn up to arrest her and offers to represent her.

He tells Baladevi that he is not a moral man and that he's not representing Baladevi because he believes in her innocence. He's not interested in knowing whether she is innocent or not, but he likes her. He also lets her know that Subhashini was sleeping with multiple men including him and that Thilakan had been spared in his naive love for her.

He represents Baladevi competently and destroys Ramu's false witness testimony. Baladevi feels attracted to Jayamohan. Jayamohan's mother mentions to Baladevi that her prayers have been answered because Jayamohan's behavior has reformed since meeting Baladevi.

The Court acquits Baladevi. Jayamohan who was waiting outside the Court, and she go off together happily.

== Soundtrack ==
The film features three songs written by noted poet O. N. V. Kurup and composed by Ilaiyaraaja.

Song	Artist(s)	Picturisation
"Bulbul Bulbul Maine"	K. J. Yesudas	Party song picturised on Mammootty, Seema and others
"Manjum Kulirum"	Krishnachandran & S. Janaki	Romantic duet picturised on Shankar and Uma
"Mizhiyil Meen Pidanju"	K. J. Yesudas	Love song picturised on Mammootty and Seema

== Reception ==
On 4 March 1983, The Hindu wrote, "Century Productions' latest offering Sandhyakku Virinja Poovu directed by P. G. Vishwambaran succeeds in presenting the sentimental story of a doctor. Consequently, it also marks a departure from Vishwambaran's earlier films." the same day The Indian Express wrote, "While director P. G. Vishwambaran has excelled in his directorial role, he is supported by a tight screenplay and crisp dialogues by Thoppil Bhasi which makes the film pacy and towards the end highly suspenseful" further writing "Seema, as Dr. Bala gives a stand out performance, being particularly impressive in highly emotional sequences. She is matched in acting by Mammootty, who is advocate Jayamohan."

== Legacy ==
In 2017, The Times of India described Mammootty's role as one of the "astounding advocate roles he has given life to". Seema herself rated her role of Dr. Baladevi in Sandhyakku Virinja Poovu and as the teenage prostitute in Avalude Ravukal as her best.
