= Pakalppooram =

Pakalpooram
- Directed by: Anil Babu
- Written by: Rajan Kiriyath
- Produced by: Santhosh Damodharan
- Starring: Mukesh; Geetu Mohandas; Jagathy Sreekumar; Harisree Ashokan; Babu Namboothiri; Salim Kumar
- Cinematography: Shaji Kumar
- Edited by: P. C. Mohanan
- Music by: Raveendran
- Distributed by: Damor Cinema
- Release date: 19 April 2002
- Running time: 160 minutes
- Country: India
- Language: Malayalam

Pakalppooram (transl. Daytime pooram) is a 2002 Indian Malayalam-language comedy horror film directed by Anil Babu and written by Rajan Kiriyath. Starring Mukesh, Geetu Mohandas, Jagathy Sreekumar and Harisree Ashokan. It was released on 19 April 2002 and ran 100 days in Ernakulam Lulu Theatre.

== Plot ==
The story starts with Suryamangalathu Brahmadathan Namboothiri, a young but accomplished sorcerer out to be married shortly, being requested to reign in a Yakshi terrorising the village of Brahmadesam. Realising that the Yakshi is primarily after sexual gratification with the virgin priests of the village temple, he decides that the best way to capture it is by seducing her and then enraging her by spurning her with another maiden, thus throwing her off her wits. As per plan, Brahmadattan with the help of a maiden in the locality, he is able to capture the Yakshi with a pair of enchanted anklets he winds her feet in as she is distracted. Completing a series of rituals, he leaves the temple with one anklet he plans to keep safe in bis own residence, with the other one ept secure in the temple itself. But he warns the people that if the holy anklet in the temple is moved before 16,000 days are completed, she will be reborn and that will mean the total destruction of his own family.

The maiden gets pregnant during the act and so does the newly wed official wife of Brahmadathan Namboothiri. Circumstances bring them together on the way and they give birth at the same place and the children are swapped by his scheming younger brother's servant.

Thirty years later, Gouridasan Namboothiri, brought up by Brahmadattan's official wife, is living in a poor family with his mother and sisters. After Gouridasan's father, Suryamangalathu Brahmadathan Namboothiri's death, his mother, sisters, and he were thrown out of the family by his evil younger brother, Soori Namboothiri.

Later, in order to get his rights in the ancestral family property and to save his family from miseries, he and his friend Ayyappankutty masquerade themselves as the priests who have come to stop the Yakshi, in order to steal the documents of his rights. Nandini, Gouridasans cousin, after getting to know his real identity, makes a pact with him for getting help to marry her lover, but she is murdered by the Yakshi at the palatial pond in the night. Anamika, her younger sister and Gouridasan's cousin too, gets to know of his real identity soon enough, and tells him to go to the village so that he can get the anklet on which the legal rights are mentioned and she promises to give him the other anklet which is in the temple inside the palace.

Later they understand that the place is in fact haunted by a vampire, and the story revolves around his struggles to stop the vampire, as his father had once succeeded.

Reaching Brahmadesham, Gouridasan meets a beautiful village lass named Seemanthini who save the team from angry villagers and help then perform the rituals at the temple in secret. Gouridasan falls for her soon, and in a turn of events, marries her in front of a tribal community. At this point, we are revealed that in reality, she is the reborn vampire, out for vengeance at Brahmadattan's son by the village maiden, who in her supernatural knowledge, she identifies to be Gouridasan, even though he himself is unaware of it due to him being swapped with the other child at birth.

Meanwhile, Manikyan, who grew up as the son of the maiden (but is actually the son of the official wife) gets to know who his real father is and he leaves to the palace in disguise. Gouridasan brings Seemanthini home and lies to Rishikeshan that she is his illegitimate daughter by a country lass, while Manikyan is there under the pretense of being the brother of this same lass out for vengeance for cheating his sister. Using the help of a magic frog, Vamanan gets to know the truth of Seemanthini being a Yakshi and tells the same to Ayyappankutty, Manikyan and Rishikeshan, but fails to convince Gouridasan. After an intense dance battle between Anamika and Seemanthini, which the latter aces by her supernatural prowess, the Seemanthini is chosen to be Gouridasan's wife.

On the wedding night, Seemanthini tries to have sex with Gouridasan but is intervened with the arrival of Soori Namboothiri who had drugged him and who reveals how he had killed many women and plans to molest and kill her. But she reveals her vampire form and attacks him and this is witnessed by Gouridasan. Realizing that he was wrong, he goes to Anamika and forces her to sleep with him as in order to capture the vampire the presence of a maiden is required. Though she resists, he takes her forcefully, in a re-enactment of his father's antics thirty years back.

After killing Soori, when the vampire returns, she witnesses Gouridasan getting intimate with Anamika which enrages her and she tries to attack her. Using this as an opportunity, Gouridasan successfully inserts the one anklet he obtained from Anamika on the vampire's foot, but is at a loss when that doesn't totally confine her. At this point, Manikyan enters and gives him the second anklet that he had stolen from the Brahmadesam temple, and this enables Gouridasan to defeats the vampire by tying her other foot in the second anklet too.

In the end, Gouridasan and Anamika are married and all are happy.

== Trivia ==
The "Yakshi" in this film is not the ghost of a mortal woman who died, but a Yakshi/Yakshini, which is a mythical immortal being different from mortal humans, and has been a part of Indian folklore for millennia. They are more often known for being seductresses of men, as in succubi, than for being blood thirsty vampires in themselves.

== Cast ==
- Mukesh as Gouridasan Namboothiri
- Geetu Mohandas as Seemanthini / Yakshi
- Dr. Kavitha Jose as Anamika
- Jagathy Sreekumar as Vamanan Namboothiri
- Harisree Ashokan as Ayyappankutty
- Babu Namboothiri as Sooryan Namboothiri
- Salim Kumar as Manikyan/Andipatti Arumugham
- Indrans as friend of Manikyan
- C. I. Paul as Rishikeshan Namboothiri
- Rizabawa as Suryamangalathu Brahmadathan Namboothiri
- Anil Murali as Ananthan
- Subair as Narayanan Namboothiri
- Jagannatha Varma
- Kannur Sreelatha as Brahmadathan's Wife
- Yamuna as Manikyan's Mother
- J. Pallassery
- Sangeetha Thampi as Nandini
- Shanthi Arvind as Dancer in Hey Shingaari song

== Soundtrack ==
- Hey Shingaari - P Jayachandran, K S Chitra
- Maayam chollum - K S Chitra
- Mohaswaroopini - K S Chitra
- Nadavazhiyum - Pandalam Balan
- Pakalpooram - Vidhu Prathap
