= Thanthram =

- Poster designed by Gayathri Ashokan
- Directed by: Joshiy
- Written by: Dennis Joseph
- Story by: P. F. Mathews
- Produced by: Mathew George
- Starring: Mammootty; Urvashi; Jagannatha Varma; Ratheesh
- Cinematography: Jayanan Vincent
- Edited by: K. Sankunny
- Music by: Shyam
- Production company: Central Productions
- Distributed by: Central Productions
- Release date: 25 August 1988
- Country: India
- Language: Malayalam

Thanthram (transl. Artifice) is a 1988 Indian Malayalam-language drama film, directed by Joshiy and produced by Mathew George. The film stars Mammootty, Urvashi, Ratheesh and Jagannatha Varma. The film was remade in Telugu as Chettu Kinda Pleader (1989).

== Plot ==
The film start with James, a wealthy businessman, driving back home on Christmas Eve. He notices a van tailing him and speeds to escape, but is blocked by a set of vehicles. The van eventually pushes his car into a lake, drowning both the car and James. His wife, Susanna, and son, Rony, are shocked to hear the news. As Susanna was an orphan, the only assistance that Susanna gets is from her family friends, Antony, and his wife, Mary.

During the funeral, James' estranged father, Puthenpurackal Kurien Joseph, and brother, David, arrive. The family seems to make amends with Susanna, but is more interested in James's amassed wealth. While Antony tries to help Susanna to introduce to the plantation business, Kurien and David want a power of attorney to run the business for themselves. Following a confrontation, the family files a lawsuit against Susanna, claiming her marriage to James as invalid, resulting in Susanna and her child not becoming entitled to James' wealth. Susanna is also threatened by Kurien and David's men, by chasing after her car.

Receiving no help from anyone, a helpless Susanna, by-chance, encounters George Korah Vettickal, an advocate. He is an old-fashioned man, who dropped out halfway through priesthood studies from a Catholic seminary. He is an unsuccessful lawyer, often running into trouble with dissatisfied clients and addicted to chewing tobacco. He is often guarded by his trusted assistant, Appukkuttan Pillai. Susanna hires George to defend her case after James' friend and lawyer, Advocate Rajasekharan refuses to represent her, citing his relationship with Kurien. George, as advised by Pillai, decides to take financial advantage of Susanna, asking for 2% of the total assets of James, for representing her in what appears to be a straightforward case.

However the circumstances become complicated when the church's wedding register is missing the entry of James and Susanna's wedding in April 1981, destroying any evidence of their marriage. Susanna, along with George and Pillai, visits Father Gabriel, who ordained the wedding. However, the elderly priests fail to help them as he is suffering from dementia. On the way back, they are attacked by four men, who beat up George and Pillai. On visiting him at the hospital, George informs Susanna that he will refuse to undertake the case. However, George is beaten by the same men, again, and threatened against representing Susanna's case. Following this, a determined George decides to proceed with the case. He moves into James's bungalow, as his office was destroyed by the four men.

Kurien further establishes that Susanna was arrested in February 1981, for prostitution, and admitted to a rescue home, which turned her into a psychiatric patient. Kurien manages to convince the parish vicar of this, by producing a police officer, rescue home warden, and psychologist. This further disappoints George, as Susanna concealed all this from him. Susanna reveals her past to George. A young Susanna, an orphan, trained in accounting, attends a job interview in James' company. James traps and rapes Susanna. She is mistakenly arrested for prostitution by the commissioner of police and is sentenced to 18 days in a rescue shelter. She ends up on the street, mentally shocked. A repentant James finds her, gets her treated, and marries her.

Convinced of the narrative, George resumes his work. They accidentally find their wedding video tape, where George identifies one of the men who attacked him. He further discovers that the business manager, Unnikrishnan, is collaborating with somebody else. He also confronts the church clerk who erased the wedding records and recovers the records. He traps and beats up two of the men who attacked him.

George not only establishes the wedding in the court, but also files a private suit, claiming that James was murdered. The police, after their investigation, arrest both Kurien and David. He further reveals that Kurien Joseph is James' step-father, with witnesses from the past. James also believed that Kurien murdered his own father, John Varghese, and married his mother to capture all of their family assets. His manager, Unnikrishnan, testifies that James rejected pleas of financial help by Kurien and David. Just before his death, James had an altercation with Kurien and David. James' ex-assistant, Peter, testifies witnessing Kurien and his men murdering James. The court finds Kurien guilty. The court postpones the sentencing to the next day.

Kurien, on a last ditch attempt, attacks Susanna, Rony, and Antony, on their way back home. Antony is stabbed to death. However, George arrives just in time to save Susanna and Rony. Kurien is killed when his car plunges into a mountain ditch during the fight.

== Cast ==
- Mammootty as Advocate George Korah Vettickal alias Kora Vakkeel
- Urvashi as Susanna James
- Jagannatha Varma as Puthenpurackal Kurien Joseph
- Ratheesh as James, son of John Varghese
- Kunchan as Appukkuttan Pillai
- Janardanan as Advocate Rajasekharan
- Azeez as Antony
- K.P.A.C. Lalitha as Mary Antony
- Thrissur Elsy as Achamma
- Master Kuriyachan as Rony James, James' son
- P. C. George as Police Commissioner
- Rajasekharan as Psychiatrist Jayachandran
- P. K. Abraham as Father Gabriel
- Ravi Menon as Father Paul, George Korah's seminary mate
- Hari as a Sessions Court Judge
- Ajith as David Kurian Joseph / , James' brother
- Latheef as Unnikrishnan, Kurien's manager
- Mohan Jose
- Ajith Kollam as Samson Thomas Cherian

== Release ==
The film was released on 25 August 1988.

=== Box office ===
The film was commercial success.

== Trivia ==
- Thanthram was one of the three films in 1988 where Joshiy collaborated with Mammootty and script writer Dennis Joseph. This followed the trio's landmark film, New Delhi, in 1987
