= Athirathan (film) =

- Directed by: Pradeep Kumar
- Written by: Pradeep Kumar; Adv Manilal (dialogues)
- Screenplay by: Adv Manilal
- Starring: Suresh Gopi; Geetha; Jagathy Sreekumar; KPAC Lalitha
- Cinematography: Tony
- Edited by: K. Rajagopal
- Music by: Johnson
- Production company: Maithry Productions
- Distributed by: Maithry Productions
- Release date: 27 September 1991
- Country: India
- Language: Malayalam

Athirathan is a 1991 Indian Malayalam-language film directed by Pradeep Kumar. The film stars Suresh Gopi, Geetha, Jagathy Sreekumar and KPAC Lalitha in the lead roles. The film has musical score by Johnson.

== Cast ==
- Suresh Gopi as Sethu
- Geetha as Devu
- Jagathy Sreekumar as Shivaraman
- KPAC Lalitha as Meenakshi
- Suchitra as Nimmy
- Siddique as James
- Risabava as Benny Fernandez
- Vijayaraghavan as Chandru
- Prathapachandran as Andrew George
- Rajan P. Dev as Govinda Bhattacharya
- James as Raghavan
- M. S. Thripunithura as Advocate
- Paravoor Bharathan as Kochettan
- Zainuddin as Abu
- Keerikkadan Jose as Gunda

== Soundtrack ==
The music was composed by Johnson and the lyrics were written by Bichu Thirumala.

| No. | Song | Singers | Lyrics | Length (m:ss) |
|---|---|---|---|---|
| 1 | "Engo Painkili Etho Kaakali" (F) | K. S. Chithra | Bichu Thirumala | |
| 2 | "Engo Painkili Etho Kaakali" (M) | K. J. Yesudas | Bichu Thirumala | |
| 3 | "Maathalam Poo Thedi Vannu" | K. J. Yesudas, K. S. Chithra | Bichu Thirumala | |
