= Chandrolsavam =

- VCD cover
- Directed by: Ranjith
- Written by: Ranjith
- Produced by: Santhosh Damodharan
- Starring: Mohanlal; Meena; Ranjith
- Cinematography: Alagappan N.
- Edited by: L. Bhoominathan
- Music by: Vidyasagar
- Production company: Damor Cinema
- Distributed by: Damor Cinema Release
- Release date: 14 April 2005
- Running time: 155 minutes
- Country: India
- Language: Malayalam

Chandrolsavam (Transl.Moon Festival) is a 2005 Indian Malayalam-language action drama film written and directed by Ranjith. It stars Mohanlal and Meena in the lead role with Ranjith, Cochin Haneefa, VK Sreeraman, Santhosh, and Jagadish in supporting roles. V. Dakshinamoorthy makes a cameo appearance as Sreehari's guru. The film features music composed by Vidyasagar.

== Plot ==
Sreehari, the protagonist, is compelled to leave his village and home after being convicted of plotting a murder and returns home after spending a year in jail and living in Paris for many years. Hari was in a deep relationship with Indu, and their marital prospects were sabotaged by Indu's mother, Devaki. She despises Hari's family due to their familial connection with her husband - who deserted the family and left with a Tamil lady. Balachandran, a close friend of Hari and Indu, double-crosses the former and opts to marry Indu (arranged by Devaki). On the wedding day, a lamenting Hari witnesses the marriage procession, only to intervene and rescue Balachandran who is fatally attacked by Peethambaran. The latter blurts out that, Hari paid him for the attack and flees the scene. Devaki is terrified and collapses on the spot. Indu doubts Hari's integrity.

Back home, he tries to get back every moment of his past teenage romance and the sights and sounds that he had once savoured because he does not have much life left as he is afflicted with cancer. Much of the story revolves around his childhood love, Indu, and about the other two friends, one who turns out to be Indu's husband and another, Ramanunni, who tried to kill her husband and put the blame on Sreehari to get Indu. While Sreehari returns, Indu is taking care of her bedridden husband. After his return, Sreehari proves his innocence to Indu and her husband. In an attempt to get Indu, Ramanunni kills Indu's husband.

Indu comes under the shelter of Sreehari but is kidnapped by Ramanunni and saved by Sreehari. Meanwhile, Doctor Durga enters Sreehari's home and everyone is disappointed by her arrival as they want Indu to be united with Sreehari. Durga reveals that she is running a hospital along with her husband in Delhi. Sreehari, their patient, escaped from the hospital without their knowledge to come to his village to see his childhood friends. Sreehari leaves with Indu and Durga for the treatment and viewers are left with a hopeful expectation that he will return healthy.

== Cast ==
- Mohanlal as Chirakkal Sreehari aka Hari aka Sree
- Meena as Indulekha aka Indu
- Ranjith as Kalathil Ramanunni
- Cochin Haneefa as Sreedharan
- V. K. Sreeraman as Kunjambu
- Santhosh as Sahadevan
- Jagadish as Kuttiraman
- Sujatha as K. P. Bhavaniamma
- Khushbu as Dr. Durga Chandrashekhar (Cameo Appearance)
- Sai Kumar as Karunan
- Samvrutha Sunil as Malavika
- Jayakrishnan Kichu as Naveen
- Murali Menon as Balachandran, Indu's husband
- Vijayan Kranthoor as Chettiyar
- Meena Ganesh as Madhavi, Ramanunni's mother
- Oduvil Unnikrishnan as Indu's grandfather
- Maniyanpilla Raju as C.I Sugathan
- Spadikam George as C.I Kurian George
- Bheeman Raghu as Ingapara "Pothu" Peethambaran
- Zeenath as Shantha
- Jayan Cherthala as Chandrashekharan
- Augustine as Jose
- Abu Salim as Vasu
- Nilambur Ayisha as Devakiamma
- V. Dakshinamoorthy - Cameo appearance

== Soundtrack ==
Chandrolsavam

Soundtrack album by Vidyasagar
- Released: March 2005
- Studios: Varshaa Vallaki, Chennai
- Genre: Feature film soundtrack
- Length: 29:25
- Language: Malayalam
- Label: Satyam Audios

Official audio
- Chandrolsavam- Full Album on YouTube

The soundtrack was composed by Vidyasagar with lyrics by Gireesh Puthenchery.

== Track listing ==
No.	Title	Singer(s)	Lyricist	Length
1	"Muttathethum"	K. J. Yesudas	Gireesh Puthenchery	6:20
2	"Ponmulam"	K. S. Chithra	Gireesh Puthenchery	5:03
3	"Aaraarum Kaanaathe (Male)"	P. Jayachandran	Gireesh Puthenchery	4:30
4	"Shobhillu Sapthaswara"	K. J. Yesudas	Tyagaraja	2:54
5	"Nijadasavaradha"	K. S. Chithra	Patnam Subramania Iyer	1:56
6	"Aaraarum Kaanaathe (Female)"	Sujatha Mohan	Gireesh Puthenchery	4:30
7	"Chempadapada"	M. G. Sreekumar	Arumughan Vengidangu	4:12

== Release ==
The film was released on 14 April 2005, on the day of Vishu. It was a box office flop, but later became popular through television screening and have a cult following.

== Reception ==
Sify.com wrote that "Meena sans any make-up has a meaty role as Indu and she has given an excellent performance. Tamil actor Renjit as Ramaunni is impressive and stands up to Mohanlal's performance. The melodious songs of Vidyasagar are hummable and V. Dakshinamoorthy makes a special appearance as Sri Hari's guru. Azhagappan's camera has etched the lush green locales of Shornur and Ottapalam aesthetically"
