= Kakka (film) =

- Film poster
- Directed by: P. N. Sundaram
- Written by: Mosses
- Screenplay by: Melattoor Ravi Varma
- Produced by: C. V. Hariharan
- Starring: Rohini; Ravi; Raghuvaran; Adoor Bhasi
- Cinematography: P. N. Sundaram
- Edited by: M. Umanath; M. Mani
- Music by: K. V. Mahadevan
- Production company: Suguna Screen
- Distributed by: Suguna Screen
- Release date: 25 November 1982
- Country: India
- Language: Malayalam

Kakka is a 1982 Indian Malayalam-language film, directed by P. N. Sundaram and produced by C. V. Hariharan. The film stars Rohini, Ravi, Raghuvaran and Adoor Bhasi. The film has musical score by K. V. Mahadevan.

== Cast ==
- Rohini
- Ravi
- Raghuvaran
- Adoor Bhasi
- Sankaradi
- V. D. Rajappan
- Achankunju
- Beena Bhaskaran
- Jagannatha Varma
- Kaduvakulam Antony
- Kanakalatha
- Kunchan
- Mala Aravindan
- Manakkad Ravi
- Master Vimal
- Punnapra Appachan
- T. M. Abraham
- Thodupuzha Vasanthi

== Soundtrack ==
The music was composed by K. V. Mahadevan and the lyrics were written by P. Bhaskaran.

No.	Song	Singers	Lyrics	Length (m:ss)
1	"Chellappan Chetta"	K. P. Brahmanandan, Sujatha Mohan, Latha Raju	P. Bhaskaran	
2	"Elalamaali"	K. J. Yesudas, S. Janaki, Chorus	P. Bhaskaran	
3	"Kaayalonnu Chirichal"	K. J. Yesudas	P. Bhaskaran	
4	"Manavaalan Paara"	S. Janaki	P. Bhaskaran	
5	"Paadasarangalkku"	K. J. Yesudas	P. Bhaskaran	
