= Randam Varavu =

- Directed by: K. Madhu
- Written by: Sajan
- Screenplay by: John Paul
- Produced by: Sajan
- Starring: Jayaram; Rekha; Jagathy Sreekumar; Sukumaran; Babu Antony; Devan
- Cinematography: Vipin Das; Jayanan Vincent
- Edited by: V. P. Krishnan
- Music by: Shyam
- Production company: Saj Productions
- Distributed by: Saj Vision
- Release date: 30 March 1990
- Country: India
- Language: Malayalam

Randam Varavu (transl. Second coming) is a 1990 Indian Malayalam-language crime thriller film, directed by K. Madhu and written by John Paul. The film stars Jayaram, Rekha, Jagathy Sreekumar and Sukumaran. The film's musical score is by Shyam. This film was a box office flop.

== Plot ==
Jayakumar is a probationary officer in Air India. He is married to Indu, who is a homemaker. Indu had married Jayakumar against the wishes of her father and so her father is not in good terms with them. Their marriage was solemnised in the presence of Sivanandji, a well known musician and singer. Jayakumar was having a good time with his family and friends. Their joy has no bounds when Indu becomes pregnant.

At that time, Jayakumar receives a letter from his native place inviting him to come to pay homage to his father's brother, who had died a year ago. Jayakumar starts in a train and reaches the railway station at midnight. Since there were no cabs available at the station and he had to travel another 40 km, he walks and reaches a junction where he finds a shared cab, whose driver was calling out for passengers to Pollachi. There were two passengers already in the cab. After waiting for some more time, two more people (Tommy and Alex) come running with a briefcase and join them. On their way, they are stopped by police. Alex and Tommy take their briefcase and make an attempt to escape with the police chasing after them. However, in the hurry Tommy had picked Jayakumar's briefcase. Tommy cleverly surrenders to police allowing Alex to escape with the briefcase. Upon questioning, Jayakumar tells that it is his briefcase and has his identity card in it. But when police open it, they find narcotics. It was then that Jayakumar realizes that their cases got swapped. Adding to Jayakumar's woes, Tommy confesses that he and Jayakumar are partners in peddling drugs and gets both of them arrested. Despite cruel and harsh treatment by the police and the narcotic team headed by DYSP Balu and DIG Vishnu, Jayakumar doesn't accept the crime. Jayakumar also faces harsh treatment from the hands of his fellow inmate Vasu. Later, he retaliates and fights back Vasu. Damu, a thief who does small robbery only to be in jail as he is unfit to do any other job, is the only source of solace for Jayakumar. With his help, Jayakumar beats up Tommy and learns of Balu's involvement in the case. When Balu discovers that the secret has been revealed, he plans to kill Jayakumar and Tommy. For questioning by the narcotics department, Jayakumar and Tommy get transported from prison. As instructed, Alex follows the police jeep in a lorry and hits the police jeep. Tommy and a few policemen get killed on the spot. However, Jayakumar escapes miraculously.

Meanwhile, Indu seeks help from her father to fight out Jayakumar's case. However her father insists on a divorce. Since she was not willing, she goes in search of a lawyer. Finally, she reaches out to Advocate Hariprasad, who had served 15 years as police officer, and then stepped down to become a lawyer. Hariprasad succeeds in getting Jayakumar out on bail, but then Vishnu and Balu visit Jayakumar that night and force him to surrender accepting the crime, otherwise they would file the charge sheet against him, which would result in serious punishment. Jayakumar is confused with it and he discusses the same with Hariprasad. It's then Hariprasad reveals how cruel the drug mafia was to his family. Hariprasad's younger brother was a victim of drugs, and had killed his parent and sister before committing suicide. His fight against drug mafia started since then, and now Hariprasad needs Jayakumar's support for the same. Jayakumar agrees to it. On the way they happen to see Alex visiting customs' officer Samuel's residence. Jayakumar visits Stephen's house pretending that it is a casual visit. Jayakumar leaves when Samuel asks him to do so fearing rumors. Jayakumar and Hariprasad then kidnap Alex and question him. Meanwhile, Balu suspects Samuel; as Alex is missing after visiting his house. Later, Balu gets arrested. Quite dejected, Samuel plans to provide all documents related to drug mafia to Jayakumar. Jayakumar collects the documents adventurously from Samuel, however Samuel is fatally shot. Jayakumar rushes to hand the documents to Hariprasad, however, Hariprasad is killed in a car bomb explosion. He follows Vishnu and kills him after a vicious duel. Sivanandji, who was revealed to be the main head of the drug mafia reaches Jayakumar's house and asks Indu for the documents that was handed over by Stephen. Indu refuses to hand over the same and she gets killed. Jayakumar tracks Sivanandji to the airport and kills him on the runway, thereby avenging Indu's death. The movie ends with Jayakumar being dragged away from the runway by cops as he happily smiles for taking down the racket and implies that his revenge is completed.

== Cast ==
- Jayaram as Jayakumar (Jayan)
- Rekha as Indu Jayakumar
- Jagathy Sreekumar as Gopi
- Sukumaran as Adv. Hariprasad
- Devan as DYSP T. Balu
- Babu Antony as customs officer Samuel
- Pankaj Dheer as DIG Vishnu IPS
- Charu Hassan as Sivanandji (Guruji), Jayakumar's family friend and drug Mafia leader
- Mamukkoya as Damu, Jayakumar's Jail inmate and thief
- K. B. Ganesh Kumar as Tomy, Balu and Vishnu's accomplice
- M. G. Soman as R. Sreedharan Nair, Indu's Father and Jayakumar's father-in-law
- Janardhanan as Muralikrishnan Nair, Hariprasad's friend
- Shivaji as Constable Daniel
- Bheeman Raghu as Vasu
- Jagannatha Varma as Judge
- Kollam Thulasi as Police Officer
- T. P. Madhavan as Public Prosecutor
- M. S. Thripunithura as Adv. Ramanuja Iyer
- Krishnankutty Nair as Nanappan
- James as Balan
- Kanakalatha as Dr. Ramani Menon
- Alex Mathew as Kannan
- Vijayan Peringode as jail inmate
