= Aksharathettu (film) =

- Directed by: I. V. Sasi
- Starring: Suresh Gopi; Urvasi; Sudha; Jagathy Sreekumar; Mukesh; Lizy; Janardhanan; Jagannatha Varma; Kaviyoor Ponnamma
- Edited by: K. Narayanan
- Music by: Shyam
- Release date: 24 February 1989
- Country: India
- Language: Malayalam

Aksharathettu (transl. Spelling mistake), is a 1989 Malayalam film directed by I. V. Sasi, starring Suresh Gopi, Mukesh, Jagathy Sreekumar, Urvasi and Sudha, often cited as the first solo hit of actor Suresh Gopi. Aksharathettu is the second film after Aa Raathri declared Distribute Share open

The movie is a remake of the American film Fatal Attraction, starring Michael Douglas and Glenn Close. The film was remade in Telugu language by I.V.Sasi himself as Manchivaru Maavaru, starring Dr. Rajasekhar, Jeevitha and Leena Nair.

== Plot ==
The film features the story of three bank employees and their wives. Bank manager Prakash is an ideal husband, while his wife Sumati is emotional and complaining. They have a perfect family with a smart son, a terraced house and a car. Accountant James is a womanizer and his wife Elsi is fed up with his behavior. Cashier Gowthaman is struggling to adjust with his North Indian, Hindi-speaking wife Ambika as he has to take care of all the household chores and look after their baby. There is a tangential story line involving a suspicious husband named Thankappan and his wife Radha, a maid in Prakash's home.

Then enters Renuka Menon, a beautiful widow who arrives at the bank to open an account and gets charmed by the handsome Prakash. Sumati leaves for her parents' house to celebrate her father's birthday, while Prakash is busy with a visit by the regional manager at the bank. That night after a party, it rains heavily. Prakash's car breaks down in the middle of the road. Renuka passes by her car, gives him a lift and arrives at Renuka's house. Prakash has a fever. Renuka gives an alcoholic beverage for Prakash, who is shivering due to fever and the cold. Renuka shows erotic videos to Prakash. Prakash goes to bed feeling tired, but Renuka enters and has sex with Prakash. Next day, Prakash goes away telling Renuka that it is wrong for him as he has a family and he never wants any type of relationship with Renuka. But Renuka is deeply in love with Prakash, so she goes to the bank daily to meet Prakash, but Prakash hides. Then Renuka tries to keep calling Prakash, who disconnects the call. Prakash gets tense finally seeing Renuka come to his house who gifts a saree and chocolate to Sumati and his son. Prakash returns those gifts to Renuka and warns her. Renuka gets more angry, kills all the pet animals of Prakash and vandalise his house when they all went to visit Sumathi's parents. Sumathi receives a phone call from Renuka where the latter warns her of more consequences. Sumati then asks Prakash why is Renuka interfering in their personal life for which Prakash was forced to confess about his accidental affair with Renuka.

Sumati gets angry and leave the house without hearing the full story. Sumati's mother tells Sumati that her father committed more sin, so Prakash needs to be forgiven for having an accidental sin. Thus Sumati comes back and again starts life with Prakash. Sumati goes to Renuka and tells her if she plays again, she will be cut into pieces. Renuka tries to kidnap Prakash's son, who escapes somehow. Sumati, in the process of finding her son, meets with an accident as her car hits a lorry. For this, Prakash goes to Renuka's house, has a fight and finally beats the mad-minded Renuka. Sumati is discharged from hospital. Next night, rain falls heavily. A gate turning noise is heard, Sumati opens the door, now Renuka attack Sumati and tries to kill her, leading to a fight. Finally, the son hits Renuka's head with a rock and kills her thus ending the story.

== Cast ==
- Suresh Gopi as Prakash
- Urvasi as Sumathi Prakash
- Sudha Swarnalakshmi as Renuka Nair
- Jagathy Sreekumar as Gouthaman
- Jayarekha as Chitra
- Mukesh as James
- Lizy as Elsy James
- Kuthiravattom Pappu as Thankappan
- Janardhanan as the bank Regional Manager
- Jagannatha Varma as Sumathi 's father
- Kaviyoor Ponnamma as Sumathi' s mother

== Soundtrack ==
The film contains a hit song, "Hridayam Kondezhuthiya Kavitha", composed by Shyam. Lyrics were by Sreekumaran Thampi.
