= Ayur Rekha =

- Directed by: GM Manu
- Written by: K K Sudhakaran
- Starring: Sreenivasan; Mukesh; Indrajith; Lakshmi Sharma; Saikumar
- Release date: November 8, 2007
- Country: India
- Language: Malayalam

Ayur Rekha is a 2007 Indian Malayalam film, directed by GM Manu, starring Sreenivasan, Mukesh, Indrajith, Lakshmi Sharma and Saikumar in the lead roles.

== Cast ==
- Sreenivasan as SP S.K. Jacob George IPS
- Mukesh as Thriprayar Madhavan
- Indrajith Sukumaran as Adv. Anand
- Lakshmi Sharma as Dr. Aparna Menon
- Jyothirmayi as Dr. Mallika Anand
- Mithun Murali as Arun Menon
- Jagathy Sreekumar as Thankappan Pillai
- Saikumar as Dr. Venugopal
- Nedumudi Venu as Captain Nair
- Salim Kumar as PC Ismail
- Niyaz Musaliyar as SI K.V. Balachadran
- TP Madhavan as Dr. Thomas George
- Urvashi as Alice Jacob
- Devi Chandana as Girija
- Jagannadha Varma as Adv. G.K. Nambiyar
- Pradeep
- Kochu Preman
- Ganapathi S Poduval
- Master Vaisakh
- Dr Vivin Mathew
- Anandhu S Nair

== Soundtrack ==
Music: Sabish George, Lyrics: O. N. V. Kurup

- "Indumukhi" - Vineeth Sreenivasan
- "Neelmizhikalo" (D) - M. G. Sreekumar, Ranjini Jose
- "Neelmizhikalo" (F) - Ranjini Jose
- "Sree Ranjini" - M. G. Sreekumar
