= Kuttettan =

1990 Malayalam movie

- Poster
- Directed by: Joshiy
- Written by: A. K. Lohithadas
- Produced by: K. V. Abraham (Thomsun Babu) for Thomsun Films
- Starring: Mammootty; Saritha; Maathu; Lizy; Urvashi
- Cinematography: Jayanan Vincent
- Edited by: Sankunni
- Music by: Raveendran; S. P. Venkatesh (score)
- Production company: Thomsun Films
- Distributed by: Thomsun Release
- Release date: 29 September 1990
- Running time: 133 minutes
- Country: India
- Language: Malayalam

Kuttettan is a 1990 Malayalam romantic comedy movie, directed by Joshiy and written by A. K. Lohithadas. The film stars Mammootty, Saritha, Urvashi, Lizy, Maathu, Sukumari, Jagadish, Murali and Jagannatha Varma.

== Plot ==
Vishnu is a rich businessman, married to innocent Seetha. Vishnu is a flirt and always interested in having affairs with multiple partners. However, most of his plans were unsuccessful. He pretends to love Ragini and assures her to marry her. But his intentions are different. He starts having affair with a young and beautiful Revathi. He also gets infatuated by the newly appointed steno Rose Mary at his office. But every time, he fails to reach his target. He is so lascivious and a womanizer who even gets attracted to a teenage girl. The situation gets worsened after he joins team with Thomas Chacko and Nair. Nair introduces Vishnu to a new girl Indhu, who is an orphan. Indu is childlike and innocent and she blindly believes Nair. She went off with Vishnu to his house. Vishnu, eagerly waiting for sexual intercourse, gets distracted and disappointed by Indhu's genuine nature. The climax is reached when Vishnu's mother, Malathi and her father arrive at Vishnu's bungalow. Vishnu manages to make his family believe that Indhu is his illegitimate daughter. But he had to face the dangerous consequences that awaited him. Vishnu's family accepted Indhu as his daughter and took her to the ancestral home. Vishnu is completely bewildered and disappointed as he needs to return Indhu to Nair. Vishnu changes his mind and determines not to give Indhu back to them. The rest of the story deals with the complex situations.

== Cast ==
- Mammootty as Vishnu Narayanan (Kuttettan)
- Saritha as Seetha Lakshmi, Vishnu's wife
- Maathu as Indhu
- Lizy as Revathy
- Urvashi as Rosemary
- Syama as Ragini
- Suma Jayaram as Jaya
- Suchitra as Nurse, cameo appearance
- Sukumari as Vishnu's Mother
- Jagadish as Gopalakrishnan
- Oduvil Unnikrishnan as Nanu Nair
- Murali as Nair
- Thilakan as Thomas Chacko
- Jagannatha Varma as Narayanan Menon, Vishnu's father-in-law
- Babu Namboothiri as Vishnu's friend
- Valsala Menon as Hostel Matron
- Renuka as Thomas Chacko's girlfriend

== Release ==
The film was released on 29 September 1990. The film was a commercial failure.
