= Paavam Krooran =

- Directed by: Rajasenan
- Written by: Rajasenan
- Screenplay by: Rajasenan
- Produced by: V. Rajan
- Starring: Shankar; Bhagyalakshmi (actress); Madhuri; T. G. Ravi; Captain Raju
- Cinematography: V. Karunakaran
- Edited by: G. Murali
- Music by: A. T. Ummer
- Production company: Gireesh Pictures
- Distributed by: Gireesh Pictures and Chalachitra
- Release date: 11 August 1984
- Country: India
- Language: Malayalam

Paavam Krooran is a 1984 Indian Malayalam-language crime thriller film, directed by Rajasenan and produced by V. Rajan. The film stars Shankar, Bhagyalakshmi (actress), Madhuri, T. G. Ravi and Captain Raju. The film has a musical score composed by A. T. Ummer. The film is loosely inspired by the 1983 American neo noir-thriller10 to Midnight.

== Cast ==
- Shankar as Sub Inspector Madhusoodanan
- Bhagyalakshmi
- Madhuri
- T. G. Ravi as Damodaran/Damu
- Hari as Sub Inspector Xavier
- Captain Raju
- Kalaranjini as Sheela
- Sathaar as Sub Inspector Shaji
- Devan
- Jagannatha Varma
- K. P. Ummer as Menon
- Mala Aravindan as Madhulan
- Nanditha Bose

== Soundtrack ==
The music was composed by A. T. Ummer with lyrics by Poovachal Khader.

No.	Song	Singers	Lyrics	Length (m:ss)
1	"Madhumazha Pozhiyum"	K. J. Yesudas, Chorus	Poovachal Khader	
2	"Thaalangal Unarnnidum"	S. Janaki, Chorus	Poovachal Khader	
