= Vietnam Colony =

- Directed by: Siddique-Lal
- Written by: Siddique-Lal
- Based on: Local Hero
- Produced by: Swargachitra Appachan; Joy Thomas
- Starring: Mohanlal; Innocent; Kanaka
- Cinematography: Venu
- Edited by: T. R. Shekhar
- Music by: S. Balakrishnan
- Production companies: Swargachitra; President Movies
- Distributed by: Swargachitra Release
- Release date: 22 December 1992
- Running time: 146 minutes
- Country: India
- Language: Malayalam

Vietnam Colony is a 1992 Indian Malayalam-language comedy drama film written and directed by Siddique-Lal. It stars Mohanlal, Innocent, Kanaka, and K. P. A. C. Lalitha. The soundtrack of the film was composed by S. Balakrishnan. The film achieved considerable success following its theatrical release and became the second highest-grossing film of the year behind Pappayude Swantham Appoos . A Tamil remake of the film was released in 1994 with the same title. The film is based on the 1983 British film Local Hero.

== Plot ==
G. Krishnamoorthy, who hails from a respectable Tamil Brahmin family, gets a job with the Calcutta Construction Company as a construction supervisor. He is really excited about this until his new colleague, K. K. Joseph, persuades him not to take the job. He tells Krishnamoorthy that their job is to vacate the infamous Vietnam Colony, a poor colony inhabited by day labourers, of its residents so that the building company can clear the land for construction. Joseph adds on the fact that the company has been trying to vacate the residents for years, but it has failed due to the efforts of three criminal leaders: Paravoor Ravuthar, Irumbu John and Kannappa Srank. Adding insult to injury, Joseph remarks that Krishnamoorthy is too weak to stay there and take on the criminals due to his sensitive Brahmin mannerisms. Krishnamoorthy decides that Joseph is right; the job is too dangerous for them.

Later that evening, Krishnamoorthy confronts his mother and tells her that he will be rejecting the job offer. However, his strong-willed mother won't let him free that easily. Moreover, Krishnamoorthy's relatives, whom his late father borrowed money from, demand their money back from Krishnamoorthy and threaten him if he doesn't take the job. His circumstances leave him no choice but to accept the offer.

Krishnamoorthy talks to his boss and the company lawyer, Advocate Thomas. They decide to utilize Krishnamoorthy's background in drama by making him and Joseph pose as harmless writers who want to document colony life so that they can destroy the colony from within. They also have made arrangements for the duo to stay at Pattalam Madhavi's house.

The next day, the duo arrives at the colony and finds the house. However, upon the advice of Erumely, the broker, Madhavi mistakes Krishnamoorthy as a marriage proposal for her daughter, Unni, who takes a liking to Krishnamoorthy immediately. Krishnamoorthy is not used to the new way of living, especially being so close with a girl, so everyone chides him and calls him Swami. Krishnamoorthy becomes annoyed at first, but he accepts his new nickname.

Over time, Krishnamoorthy befriends the colony members and tries to get an overview of the situation. He finds out that the proprietor is a man named Moosa Settu and that his mentally ill mother, Suhra Bai, lives in the colony. He wins Suhra Bai's trust with his kindness and compassion. Suhra Bai tells Krishnamoorthy that Moosa Settu took her money and drove her out due to his greed, and left the colony in shambles. Moreover, she knows that the criminal leaders demand monthly payments from the colony's residents so that they don't kill anyone. Krishnamoorthy realizes that the colony members aren't so bad after all, so he tries to help them a little bit by improving the infrastructure of the colony. He gains the trust of the colony residents and even the gangsters. Krishnamoorthy becomes confident that he can relocate the colony peacefully.

Krishnamoorthy begins his plan by striking a deal with his bosses to give the colony residents a large amount of land with houses to which they can relocate, and puts up a show of negotiation in front of the colony to make them agree to the plan. In a large pep talk, he convinces the colony that they can get whatever they want if they are united. In the least unexpected time, Suhra Bai becomes adamant, saying that she cannot leave the land that she inherited from her father. Ravuthar kicks her in a fit of rage, and she dies the next day. Swami sets out to find Moosa Settu to perform his mother's last rites. To Krishnamoorthy's surprise, he finds Advocate Thomas living in Moosa Settu's bungalow. Even more surprising, he finds the now homeless Moosa Settu at the local madrasa and makes him perform his mother's last rites.

Krishnamoorthy realizes that the company that he works for is trying to illegally demolish the land. However, his timing fell a little short; the colony finds out that Krishnamoorthy was on the company's side, and tries to oust him by attacking him until he picks up a knife and fends them off. Swami confesses and vows to fight for the colony's justice. Unni admires Krishnamoorthy's bravery and slowly falls in love with him. The goons are now on the company's side, as they have been asked to vacate the colony in exchange for a large sum of money. The goons attack Krishnamoorthy but he fights them back. The colony residents then come out and beat up the goons and Advocate Thomas. The films ends happy as the colony residents praise Krishnamoorthy for his heroism and he leaves for home and Unnimol sneaks away with him ending the movie.

== Cast ==
- Mohanlal as G. Krishnamurthy
- Innocent as K. K. Joseph
- Kanaka as Unnimol
- Devan as Advocate Thomas
- Vijaya Rangaraju as Paravur Rowther (voice Dubbed By N. F. Varghese )
- Jagannatha Varma as Ajay Panicker, Company MD
- K. P. A. C. Lalitha as Pattalam Madhavi Amma
- Nedumudi Venu as Moosa Settu
- Kuthiravattam Pappu as Erumeli
- Vijayaraghavan as Vattappalli
- Bheeman Raghu as Irumpu John
- Philomina as Suhra Bai, Moosa Settu's elderly mother
- Kaviyoor Ponnamma as Parvathiyammal, Krishnamurthy's mother
- T. P. Madhavan as Sivaraman Krishnamurthy's maternal uncle
- Kunchan as Pattabhiraman, Sivaraman's son and Krishnamurthy's cousin
- Sankaradi as Insane Man
- Santhakumari as Colony woman
- T. R. Omana as Krishnamoorthy's aunt
- Priyanka Anoop as Colony Girl
- James as Colony man
- Manju Satheesh as Colony girl
- Radhika as Krishnamoorthy's Niece

== Production ==
Vietnam Colony was produced and distributed by Swargachitra Appachan under the banner of Swargachitra, co-produced by Joy for President Movies. The film was shot in Alappuzha, and Kalpathy in Kerala. In 2017, actor Jayasurya revealed that he came to the filming location in Alappuzha as a junior artist, but was not recruited as the preference was for the local people in Alappuzha.

== Box office ==
The movie was a huge commercial success. It was the second highest-grossing film of the year 1992.

== Soundtrack ==
Vietnam Colony

Soundtrack album by S. Balakrishnan
- Released: December 1992
- Genre: Feature film soundtrack
- Language: Malayalam
- Label: Mudra Cassettes; Johny Sagariga; Wilson Audios

S. Balakrishnan chronology
| Mr & Mrs (1992) | Vietnam Colony (1992) | Mazhavilkoodaram (1995) |

The film's soundtrack contains six songs, all composed by S. Balakrishnan and lyrics by Bichu Thirumala.

| No. | Title | Singer(s) | Raga |
|---|---|---|---|
| 1 | "Pavanarachezhuthunnu" | K. J. Yesudas | Mayamalavagowla |
| 2 | "Thaala Melam" | M. G. Sreekumar, Minmini | |
| 3 | "Lallalam Chollunna" | K. J. Yesudas | Abheri |
| 4 | "Paathiravayi Neram" | Minmini | Sindhu Bhairavi |
| 5 | "Pavanarachezhuthunnu" | Kalyani Menon, Sujatha Mohan, Chorus | Mayamalavagowla |

== Reception ==
The movie was extremely well received and became a critical and commercial success. The technical aspects of the movie were well appreciated. Dialogues such as "Ithalla, ithinapporum chaadi kadannavananee K.K Joseph!" and many others still find their way into the daily conversation of Malayalees.

== Awards ==
Kerala State Film Awards

- Best Art Director - Mani Suchitra

Kerala Film Chamber Award

- Best Supporting Actress - K. P. A. C. Lalitha
- Best Female Playback Singer - Minmini
