= Thirakal =

- Poster
- Directed by: K. Vijayan
- Written by: Kamala Govind; K. Basanth (dialogues)
- Screenplay by: K. Basanth
- Produced by: Bhanu Prakash V Pai
- Starring: Mohanlal; Seema; Sukumari; Jagathy Sreekumar; Kaviyoor Ponnamma
- Cinematography: Ashok Gunjal
- Edited by: Santharam
- Music by: Shankar–Ganesh
- Production company: Santheri Creations
- Distributed by: Santheri Creations
- Release date: 28 November 1984
- Country: India
- Language: Malayalam

Thirakal (transl. Waves) is a 1984 Indian Malayalam-language film directed by K. Vijayan and produced by Bhanuprakash V Pai. The film stars Mohanlal, Seema, Sukumari, Jagathy Sreekumar and Kaviyoor Ponnamma in the lead roles. The film has musical score by Shankar–Ganesh.

== Plot ==
After rejecting James's proposal and enduring his defamation, Saritha's life crumbles. Seeking solace from the trauma, she seeks refuge in her brother-in-law's home, only to face another setback.

== Cast ==
- Seema as Saritha
- Mohanlal as James George
- Jagathy Sreekumar as Varkey
- Kaviyoor Ponnamma as Madhaviyamma
- Venu Nagavally as Balan
- Captain Raju as Chandran
- Menaka as Rekha
- Sukumari as James's mother
- Baby Gayathri as Minikutty
- Jagannatha Varma as Thomas George
- Lalu Alex as Varghese
- Sathyapriya as Sarala
- Santhakumari as Rekha's mother
- Sulekha as Daisy

== Soundtrack ==
The music was composed by Shankar–Ganesh and the lyrics were written by Poovachal Khader.

No.	Song	Singers	Lyrics	Length (m:ss)
1	"Anumathiyeku"	K. J. Yesudas	Poovachal Khader	4:00
2	"Ente Jeevanil"	Jolly Abraham	Poovachal Khader	4:35
3	"Soundaryame"	K. J. Yesudas	Poovachal Khader	4:11
4	"Soundaryame" (Pathos)	K. J. Yesudas	Poovachal Khader	1:19
5	"Venmathippoothookum"	Vani Jairam	Poovachal Khader	3:42
