= Varshangal Poyathariyathe =

- Directed by: Mohan Roop
- Written by: Mohan Roop
- Screenplay by: Mohan Roop
- Starring: Prince Vaidyan; Reshmi Kailas; Sukumari; Innocent; Nedumudi Venu; Menaka
- Cinematography: Satheesh
- Edited by: Jimmy
- Music by: Mohan Sithara
- Production company: Jayasoorya Films
- Distributed by: Jayasoorya Films
- Release date: 11 June 1987
- Country: India
- Language: Malayalam

Varshangal Poyathariyathe is a 1987 Indian Malayalam film, directed by Mohan Roop. The film stars debutants Prince Vaidyan and Reshmi Kailas along with Sukumari, Innocent, Nedumudi Venu and Menaka in the supporting roles. The film has musical score by Mohan Sithara.

== Plot ==
A man falls in love with his professor's daughter. However, when she realises that she has mental health problems, she decides to get separated him from her.

== Cast ==
- Rashmi Kailas as Veni
- Prince Vaidyan as Unnikrishnan
- Sukumari as Bhagi
- Innocent
- Nedumudi Venu as Professor, Veni's father
- Menaka as Lakshmikutty
- Jagannatha Varma as Doctor
- Kalanilayam Omana
- Sindhu Varma

== Soundtrack ==
The music was composed by Mohan Sithara and the lyrics were written by Kottakkal Kunjimoideen Kutty.

No.	Song	Singers	Lyrics	Length (m:ss)
1	"Aa Gaanam"	K. J. Yesudas	Kottakkal Kunjimoideen Kutty	
2	"Aananda Poomuthe"	K. S. Chithra	Kottakkal Kunjimoideen Kutty	
3	"Ilakozhiyum Sisirathil"	K. J. Yesudas	Kottakkal Kunjimoideen Kutty	
4	"Ilakozhiyum Sisirathil"	K. S. Chithra	Jos Mylan	
