= Chakravarthy (1991 film) =

- Directed by: A. Sreekumar
- Written by: A. Sreekumar; N. K. Sasidharan (dialogues)
- Screenplay by: A. Sreekumar
- Produced by: Pappachan
- Starring: Suresh Gopi; Kasthuri; Captain Raju; Rajan P. Dev; Babu Antony
- Cinematography: B. R. Ramakrishna
- Edited by: M. V. Natarajan
- Music by: P. C. Susi
- Production company: Zion Movies
- Distributed by: Zion Movies
- Release date: 28 November 1991
- Country: India
- Language: Malayalam

Chakravarthy is a 1991 Indian Malayalam film, directed by A. Sreekumar and produced by Pappachan. The film stars Suresh Gopi, Kasthuri, Captain Raju, Rajan P. Dev, Babu Antony, Jagathy Sreekumar and Manoj K. Jayan in the lead roles. The film has musical score by P. C. Susi.

== Cast ==
- Suresh Gopi as Unni Shankar / Chakravarthy
- Kasthuri as Priya
- Captain Raju as Chandrachoodan
- Rajan P. Dev as Patrick Perrerra
- Babu Antony as Edwin
- Jagathy Sreekumar as Babu
- Manoj K. Jayan as Thampi
- Sukumaran as DYSP Shivaraman
- Jagannatha Varma as Anthony Joseph
- KPAC Sunny
- Sukumari as Lathika, Unni Shankar's mother
- Santhi Moorthy

== Soundtrack ==
The music was composed by P. C. Susi and the lyrics were written by Bichu Thirumala.

No.	Song	Singers	Lyrics	Length (m:ss)
1	"Meshavilakkinte Nertha"	K. J. Yesudas	Bichu Thirumala	
2	"Pon Kolaraalappantam"	K. J. Yesudas	Bichu Thirumala	
3	"Thoomanju Peyyum Raakenthu Kando"	K. J. Yesudas, K. S. Chithra	Bichu Thirumala	
