= Jyotsna =

Jyotsna or Jyoshna (Sanskrit: ज्योत्स्ना) is a Sanskrit word meaning moonlight. It is also a common (feminine) given name in India.

- Jyoshna (Joanne La Trobe), New Zealand devotional singer/song writer
- Jyotsna Bhatt, Indian ceramicist
- Jyotsna Chandola, Indian actress
- Jyotsna Patel, former Test cricketer who represented India
- Jyotsna Radhakrishnan, playback singer in Malayalam cinema
- Jyotsna Srikanth, Indian violinist and composer
- Jyotsna Vaid, professor of psychology at Texas University
- Jyotsna Kamat, Indian historian and writer
