= List of Malayalam films of 1993 =

The following is a list of Malayalam films released in the year 1993.

| Title | Director | Screenplay | Cast |
|---|---|---|---|
| Venkalam | Bharathan | A. K. Lohithadas | Murali, Urvashi, Manoj K. Jayan |
| Sthalathe Pradhana Payyans | Shaji Kailas | Renji Panicker | Jagadish, Siddique, Suresh Gopi, Geetha. |
| Vakkeel Vasudev | P. G. Viswambaran | B. Jayachandran | Jayaram, Jagadish, Sunitha |
| Ente Sreekuttikku | Jose Thomas | T. A. Razzaq | Mukesh, Thilakan, Maathu |
| Dhruvam | Joshiy | S. N. Swamy | Mammootty, Gautami, Jayaram, Suresh Gopi, Vikram |
| Aayirappara | Venu Nagavally | | Mammootty, Urvashi, Madhu |
| Ponnu Chami | Ali Akbar | | Suresh Gopi, Chithra, Vijayaraghavan |
| Akashadoothu | Sibi Malayil | Dennis Joseph | Murali, Madhavi |
| Ghoshayaathra | G. S. Vijayan | T. A. Razzaq | Sai Kumar, Parvathy, Geetha |
| Injakkadan Mathai & Sons | Anil Babu | Kaloor Dennis | Innocent, Suresh Gopi, Jagadish, Urvashi, Saranya |
| Cheppadividya | G. S. Vijayan | Sasidharan Arattuvazhi | Sudheesh, Monisha, Sreenivasan |
| Ottayadipathakal | C. Radhakrishnan | | Revathy, Madhu |
| Thiraseelakku Pinnil | P. Chandrakumar | | Jayabharathi |
| Agnishalabhangal | P. Chandrakumar | | M. G. Soman, Maathu |
| Mithunam | Priyadarsan | Sreenivasan | Mohanlal, Urvashi, Sreenivasan |
| Aalavattam | Raju Ambaran | | Nedumudi Venu, Innocent, Shanthi Krishna, Sreenivasan, |
| Vatsalyam | Cochin Haneefa | A. K. Lohithadas | Mammootty, Geetha, Sunitha, Siddique |
| Devasuram | I. V. Sasi | Ranjith | Mohanlal, Innocent, Revathi, Napoleon |
| Ammayane Sathyam | Balachandra Menon | Balachandra Menon | Mukesh, Annie, Balachandra Menon |
| Paithrukam | Jayaraj | Kaloor Dennis | Suresh Gopi, Jayaram, Geetha, Narendra Prasad |
| Kulapathy | Nahas | | Vijayakumar, Anusha, Ashokan, KPAC Lalitha, Prem Kumar |
| Pravachakan | P. G. Viswambharan | Sasidharan Arattuvazhi | Mukesh, Siddique |
| Sthreedhanam | Anil Babu | | Jagadeesh, Urvashi |
| Ghazal | Kamal | T. A. Razzaq | Vineeth, Mohini, Nassar |
| Samagamam | George Kithu | John Paul | Jayaram, Thilakan, Sukumari, Kaviyoor Ponnamma, Rohini |
| Jackpot | Jomon | T Damodaran | Mammootty, Gouthami, Aishwarya, Jagadish |
| Ekalavyan | Shaji Kailas | Renji Panicker | Suresh Gopi, Narendra Prasad, Geetha, Siddique |
| Gandhari | Sunil | | Madhavi, Siddique, Babu Antony, Charuhasan |
| Journalist | Viji Thampi | Kaloor Dennis | Jagadish, Sithara, Saranya, Siddique |
| City Police | Venu Nair | Kaloor Dennis | Suresh Gopi, Geetha, Kakka Ravi |
| Samooham | Sathyan Anthikkad | J. Pallassery | Suhasini, Sreenivasan, Suresh Gopi, Manoj K Jayan |
| Chamayam | Bharathan | John Paul | Murali, Manoj K Jayan, Meghanathan, Sithara, Ranjitha |
| Kanyakumariyil Oru Kavitha | Vinayan | | Vineeth, Rajan P. Dev, Suchithra |
| Sarovaram | Jeassy | Dennis Joseph | Mammootty, Thilakan, Narendra Prasad, Jayasudha |
| Bandhukkal Sathrukkal | Sreekumaran Thampi | Sreekumaran Thampi | Mukesh, Jayaram, Narendra Prasad, Jagathy Sreekumar, Thilakan, Rohini, Rupini, KPAC Lalitha |
| Butterflies | Rajeev Anchal | A. K. Sajan | Mohanlal, Aishwarya, Jagadish, Nassar |
| Maya Mayooram | Sibi Malayil | Ranjith | Mohanlal, Shobana, Revathi |
| Gandharvam | Sangeeth Sivan | Dennis Joseph | Mohanlal, Kanchan, Jagathy Sreekumar, Shanthi Krishna |
| Addeham Enna Iddeham | Viji Thampi | J. Pallassery | Jagadish, Siddique, Sunitha, Maathu |
| O' Faby | Sreekumar | | Nagesh, Thilakan, Srividya |
| Customs Diary | T. S. Suresh Babu | | Jayaram, Mukesh, Jagathy Sreekumar, Ranjitha |
| Oru Kadankatha Pole | Joshy Mathew | John Paul | Jayaram, Geetha |
| Aagneyam | P. G. Viswambharan | | Jayaram, Gautami, Sunitha, Maathu |
| Naaraayam | Sasi Sankar | | Murali, Urvashi |
| Uppukandam Brothers | T. S. Suresh Babu | Kaloor Dennis | Jagadish, Geetha, Babu Antony, Baiju |
| Mafia | Shaji Kailas | Renji Panicker | Suresh Gopi, Vikram, Geetha, Tiger Prabhakar, Vijayaraghavan |
| Meleparambil Anveedu | Rajasenan | Raghunath Paleri | Jayaram, Shobana, Jagathy, Vijayaraghavan, Narendra Prasad |
| Padheyam | Bharathan | A. K. Lohithadas | Mammootty, Chippi, Sasikala |
| Koushalam | T. S. Mohan | V. R. Gopalakrishnan | Siddique, Urvashi, Swetha Menon |
| Chenkol | Sibi Malayil | A. K. Lohithadas | Mohanlal, Thilakan, Cochin Haneefa, Shanthi Krishna |
| Golanthara Vartha | Sathyan Anthikkad | Sreenivasan | Mammootty, Shobana, Kanaka |
| Sakshal Sreeman Chathunni | Anil Babu | Kaloor Dennis | Innocent, Jagadish, Baiju, Maathu |
| Sowbhagyam | Sandhya Mohan | | Sunitha, Jagadish, Jagathy Sreekumar, Suchithra |
| Yaadhavam | Jomon | Ranjith | Suresh Gopi, Khushbu, Narendra Prasad |
| Kalippattam | Venu Nagavally | Venu Nagavalli | Mohanlal, Urvashi, Vineeth |
| Janam | Viji Thampi | | Murali, Jagadish, Siddique, Geetha |
| Vidheyan | Adoor Gopalakrishnan | | Mammootty, M. R. Gopakumar, Sabitha Anand, Tanvi Azmi |
| Thalamura | K. Madhu | | Mukesh, Madhu, Anju |
| Bhoomi Geetham | Kamal | T. A. Razzaq | Murali, Geetha |
| Magrib | P. T. Kunju Muhammed | | Murali, Sreenivasan, V. K. Sreeraman, Saranya, Zeenath |
| Swaham | Shaji N. Karun | | Sharath, Annapoorna |
| Aacharyan | Asokan | | Thilakan, Sreenivasan, Suresh Gopi, Vineeth |
| Shudhamaddalam | Thulasidas | | Mukesh, Madhurima, Vijayakumar |
| Ithu Manjukaalam | Thulasidas | | Suresh Gopi, Urvashi |
| Arthana | I. V. Sasi | Raghunath Paleri | Murali, Radhika, Priya Raman |
| Sopanam | Jayaraj | Kaithapram | Manoj K. Jayan, Chippy, J. V. Somayajulu |
| Manichitrathazhu | Fazil | Madhu Muttom | Mohanlal, Suresh Gopi, Shobana, Vinaya Prasad |
| Padaleeputhram | Baiju Thomas | | |
| Thaali | Sajan | | Mukesh, Baiju, Thilakan, Saranya |
| Avan Ananthapadmanabhan | Prakah Koleari | | Sudha Chandran, Ramesh Aravind |
| Kabooliwala | Siddique-Lal | Siddique-Lal | Innocent, Jagathy, Vineeth, Charmila |
| Johnny | Sangeeth Sivan | | Master Tharun Kumar, Shanthi Krishna |
| Kavadiyattam | Aniyan | | Jayaram, Jagathy Sreekumar, Siddique |
| Aparna | | | |
| Porutham | Kaladharan | | Murali, Siddique, Sreelekshmi |
| Easwaramoorthy IN | Pradeep Gomas | | Sai Kumar, Saranya Ponvannan |
| Theeram Thedunna Thirakal | | | |
| Meghasangeetham | | | |
| Vaasarashayya | G. S. Panicker | | M. G. Soman, Maathu |
