= Vanarasena =

- Directed by: Jayakumar Varkala
- Written by: Sunil
- Screenplay by: Robin Thirumala
- Produced by: Fax Production
- Starring: Jagathy Sreekumar; Baiju; Anju Aravind; Augustine
- Cinematography: R H Ashok
- Edited by: PC Mohanan
- Music by: Berny-Ignatius
- Production company: Fax Productions
- Distributed by: Fax Productions
- Release date: 15 October 1996
- Country: India
- Language: Malayalam

Vanarasena is a 1996 Indian Malayalam film, directed by Jayan Varkala. The film stars Jagathy Sreekumar, Baiju, Anju Aravind and Augustine in lead roles. The film had musical score by Berny-Ignatius.

== Plot ==
Vadakkekkara Kanaran Karanavar and Thekkekkara Narayani are siblings and experts at scrying - Mashinottam, the magical art of seeing anything under the sun on a patch of magical ink spread on a beetelnut leaf. The villagers frequently come to them to find stolen objects, thieves and such. Unbeknownst to them, their sons Achyuthan and Manikandan have taken to petty stealing within the village for want of an income. Once it so happens that a heirloom kitchen vessel was stolen from one of the rich houses, and Pankajakshan, the house manager is sent to Kanaran to scry the thief by the owner. Kanaran, to his shock, sees his own son Achyuthan as the thief on scrying, and in order to save him, makes up the lie on the spot that Pankajakshan himself is the thief.

The clumsy Pankajakshan is naturally fired and shamed due to this lie, and goes to Narayani this time to discern the truth. To his bad luck, Narayani sees her own son Manikandan in the leaf as both the young men were in the act together, and repeats the lie that Pankajakshan himself is the thief to save her own son. To save their combined skin, Narayani and Kanaran later plant the stolen vessel in Pakajakshan's home and get him arrested by the police promptly. Innocent Pankajakshan is sent to jail.

Meanwhile Narayani's daughter, the feisty Ambika is betrothed to Manikandan while Kanaran's daughter, the demure Thankamani is betrothed reciprocally to Narayani's son Achuthan. The lovebirds struggle to break free of the stranglehold of their parents and the village itself, especially lacking financial independence. Achyuthan is frequently caught enjoying kissing a shy Thankamani's cheeks and lips from among the shrubs, the chirpy Ambika usually dominates Manikandan. Romeo Bhaskaran is a regular dumb eve-teaser who is after both girls. Vaidyar, the traditional healer of the village, while weak in his craft, is more adept at creating rift between people and enjoying rivalries. His one redeeming quality is that he alone, in the village, seems to trust the innocence of Pankajakshan.

When Pankajakshan returns from jail, he is a changed man, and the previously clumsy innocent villager takes it upon himself, Monte Cristo style, to avenge the injustice meted out to him and punish the two scryers for the blatant lie that spoiled his life. Instead of presenting himself before the villagers, he conspires with Vaidyar to devise a plan to destroy the two scryers. Vaidyar, using his instigatory skills, raises mistrust between Kanaran and Narayani, and soon the two drift apart as sworn enemies, even cancelling the planned marriages between their children, much to the detriment of the lovebirds. At this point, Pankajakshan sends Joykutty, a trusted compatriot from jail to his village in disguise as Ulpalakshan, a scryer, to challenge both Kanaran and Narayani. While his initial attempts fail comically, with the help of Vaidyar, they succeed in making the naive villagers trust him using thievery. Coupled with the general disdain for Kanaran and Narayani for their bickering, the villagers start to depend on Ulpalakshan. When desperate Achuthan and Manikandan resort to reckless thievery to find a way to run away with their lovers and then start combining their operations deliberately so neither Kanaran nor Manikandan will expose either, and are subsequently forced to keep mum, the villagers decide that both old scryers have lost their ability to bickering and abandon them totally, flocking around Ulpalakshan instead.

At this point, Ulpalakshan meets the cute Thankamani at the riverfront and flirts with her, earning a reprimand from her brother Manikandan. However, her father Kanaran turns a new page, wanting to make the hot new scryer in town Ulpalakshan his son-in-law, sidelining Narayani once and for all. At Vaidyar's instigation, Narayani too follows suit, vying for Ulpalakshan as her son-in law, and the two siblings compete to treat Ulpalakshan and send their young daughters Ambika and Thankamani to his room to deliver meals, much to the dismay of Manikandan and Achyuthan.

One day, the village wakes up to the news that both young damsels display signs of pregnancy. Instead of being shocked, Kanaran and Narayani, in their twisted minds, rejoice that their own daughter shall win Ulpalakshan as their husband. Things come to a fix as Joykutty's enemies from jail come looking for him to settle old scores, exposing his disguise, but Vaidyar manipulates both Kanaran and Narayani to drive the thugs off. Satisfied at the duo's humbling, Pankajakshan presents himself before all and reveal the whole plot, and we learn that Ambika and Thankamani have been merely faking pregnancies in cahoots with both their lovers and Ulpalakshan. Kanaran and Narayani finally make up and the lovebirds unite as was betrothed.

== Cast ==
- Jagathy Sreekumar as Pankajakshan
- Baiju as Ulpalakshan/Joykutty
- K. T. S. Padannayil as Vadakkekara Kanaran Karanavar
- Philomina as Thekkekkara Narayani
- Bahadoor as Lambodharan, Narayani's Husband
- Usharani as Vishalakshi, Kanaran's Wife
- Augustine as Vaidyar
- Sudheesh as Manikandan, Kanaran's Son
- Anju Aravind as Ambika, Narayani's Elder Daughter
- Vettukili Prakash as Achuthan, Narayani's Son
- Kavitha Thampi as Thankamani, Kanaran's Daughter
- Kunjandi as Tea Shop Owner
- Narayanankutty as Romeo Bhaskaran

== Soundtrack ==
The music was composed by Berny-Ignatius and the lyrics were written by Gireesh Puthenchery.

No.	Song	Singers	Lyrics	Length (m:ss)
1	"Ponnum Kinaave"	K. S. Chithra, M. G. Sreekumar	Gireesh Puthenchery	
2	"Thom Thithom"	M. G. Sreekumar, Chorus	Gireesh Puthenchery	
