= Chess (2006 film) =

- DVD cover
- Directed by: Raj Babu
- Written by: Udayakrishna; Siby K. Thomas
- Starring: Dileep; Bhavana; Salim Kumar
- Cinematography: Sanjeev Shankar
- Edited by: P.C. Mohanan
- Music by: Berny Ignatius; C.Rajamani
- Distributed by: Kalasangham Films
- Release date: 7 July 2006
- Running time: 160 minutes
- Country: India
- Language: Malayalam

Chess is a 2006 Indian Malayalam-language action thriller film directed by Raj Babu (in his directorial debut). Starring Dileep plays the male protagonist and Bhavana as the heroine.

== Plot ==
Vijayakrishnan is an ordinary man who longs for his father's love. After his father's premeditated death, as the only heir to all his father's property, he is betrayed by his trusted lawyer who confirms his documents as fake. The people who are after Vijayakrishnan's father's wealth, murder his mother in front of him by dousing her with gasoline and burning her. Vijayakrishnan is then beaten unconscious by them. To get his revenge on the criminals who killed his parents and cheated him out of his wealth, Vijayakrishnan pretends to be blind and deceives them, one by one. The ensuing incidents shape the rest of the film.

== Cast ==
- Dileep as Vijayakrishnan
- Ashish Vidyarthi as Crime Branch SP Swaminathan IPS
- Vijayaraghavan as City Police Commissioner Devarajan IPS
- Jagathy Sreekumar as Constable Narayanan
- Salim Kumar as Unnikannan
- Harisree Ashokan as Kallan Bhaskaran
- Bhavana as Dr. Radhika Varma
- Sai Kumar as Retired DGP Krishnadas IPS, Vijayakrishnan's father
- Kalasala Babu as Doctor Marar
- Bheeman Raghu as DYSP Koshy
- Baburaj as CI Sarath Chandran
- Suresh Krishna as Adv. Raj Mohan
- Mohan Jose as Vasu, Vijay's right hand
- Janardhanan as Easwara Varma, Radhika's grandfather
- Jagannatha Varma as DIG Bharathan Kurup IPS
- Madhupal as Adv. Mathew Varghese
- Rajalakshmi as Rajalakshmi, Vijayakrishnan's mother
- Baby Nayanthara as Achu, Swaminathan's daughter
- Kunchan as Eye Specialist
- Rani Larius as Swaminathan's wife
- Dimple Rose as Radhika's friend

== Soundtrack ==
Chess

Soundtrack album by Berny–Ignatius
- Released: July 2006
- Recorded: 2006
- Genre: Feature film soundtrack
- Length: 19:20
- Language: Malayalam
- Label: Satyam Audio

Official audio
- Chess- Full Album on YouTube

The movie features a soundtrack composed by Berny Ignatius and lyrics written by Vayalar Sarathchandra Varma.

Track listing
No.	Title	Lyrics	Music	Singer(s)	Length
1.	"Chantham Kalindi"	Vayalar Sarathchandra Varma	Berny Ignatius	K. J. Yesudas
2.	"Chantham Kalindi"	Vayalar Sarathchandra Varma	Berny Ignatius	K. S. Chithra, K. J. Yesudas
3.	"Chess"	Vayalar Sarathchandra Varma	Berny Ignatius	George Peter
4.	"Chantham Kalindi"	Vayalar Sarathchandra Varma	Berny Ignatius	K. S. Chithra
Total length:					19.20

== Reception ==
Paresh C Palicha from Rediff says that "Dileep. With Chess, he has brought in a seriousness to his brand of filmmaking, the only grouse being that there should [have] been a tighter script to support him. Bhavana, as the love interest, has some significance in the beginning, but it is totally lost by the end of the film. Salim Kumar and Harisree Asokan handle the comic department proficiently. Ashish Vidyarthi, Vijayraghavan, Bheeman Raghu and Babu Raj play typical villains without too much of a fuss" Sify.com wrote that "It is an out and out Dileep film. He is there in almost all frames and makes the film work. He has been successful in shedding his comedy image and tries a serious revenge drama. So if you are game to watch a film that?s different from the usual Dileep entertainers, try out Chess. It is a deep, dark tale of revenge, with a unique ending" A critic from The Hindu said that "Rajbabu, director, has presented a thriller with no suspense. All the moves made by the hero are predictable".
