= Viraat (film) =

2016 Kannada film directed by H. Vasu

Viraattt
- Viraattt
- Directed by: H. Vasu
- Written by: M. S. Ramesh
- Produced by: C. Kalyan
- Starring: Darshan; P. Ravi Shankar; Chaitra Chandranath; Isha Chawla; Vidisha Shrivastav
- Cinematography: A. V. Krishna Kumar
- Edited by: K. M. Prakash
- Music by: V. Harikrishna; Raghu Kunche
- Production companies: Teja Cinemas; C.K Entertainment
- Distributed by: Sri Veeranjaneya Swamy Productions; Mayoora Films; Surya Films; M. N. Kumar; N. G. Chandrappa
- Release date: 29 January 2016
- Running time: 144 minutes
- Country: India
- Language: Kannada

Viraattt is a 2016 Indian Kannada-language action drama film directed by H. Vasu and written by M. S. Ramesh. The film, produced by C. Kalyan under Theja Cinemas banner, features Darshan in the lead role. whilst newcomers Vidhisha Srivatsav, Isha Chawla and Chaitra Chandranath play the female lead characters. P. Ravi Shankar, Suhasini Maniratnam and Sumalatha play crucial supporting roles. V. Harikrishna has composed the soundtrack and background score, while the dialogues and screenplay were written by M. S. Ramesh.

The film which was earlier slated for a 2012 release underwent significant delays during the making due to the earlier producer and director tussles which ended up in the producer Sandesh Nagaraj walking out of the film. The film was eventually shelved and later was taken up by C. Kalyan, a Tollywood-based producer.

Viraattt was released on 29 January 2016, where it received mixed to negative reviews from critics and became a box-office bomb.

== Premise ==
Viraattt Prasad is a business magnate who faces oppositions for his thermal power project from another business magnate Surendra Singh. Viraat's trouble also increases when three girls Keerthi, Spoorthi and Preethi falls in love with him, where he decides to test them in order to prove their love.

== Cast ==
- Darshan as Viraat Prasad
- Isha Chawla as Preethi
- Vidisha Srivastava as Spoorthi
- Chaitra Chandranath as Keerthi
- Suhasini Maniratnam as Chief Minister
- Sumalatha as Viraat's mother
- P. Ravi Shankar as Surendra Singh
- Srinivasa Murthy
- Sadhu Kokila
- Bullet Prakash
- Chitra Shenoy
- Padma Vasanthi
- Bank Janardhan
- Thulasi Shivamani

== Production ==
The official launch and the first schedule shooting of Viraat began on 27 February 2012. The film considered to be a big budget venture with a big glass house worth crores of rupees is being made at the Bababudangiri Hills for the first 15 days shooting schedule. Actress Suhasini Maniratnam played the role of a powerful Chief Minister for the first time in her career.

== Reception ==
The Bangalore Mirror gave the movie 3 stars. Its review said, "[T]he film has its moments but the film isn't exactly a must-watch, except for the hero's fans", and added, "[T]he plot is more like the TV reality show The Bachelor".

== Music ==
Viraattt

Soundtrack album by V. Harikrishna
- Released: 12 January 2016
- Recorded: 2015
- Genre: Film soundtrack
- Length: 19:54
- Language: Kannada
- Label: Lahari Music
- Producer: V. Harikrishna

Music for the film is composed by V. Harikrishna who is the regular composer for Darshan's films. A single song is composed and sung by Raghu Kunche, making his debut in Kannada cinema. The song "Gandasu Safety Pin" is a recreation of Kunche's Telugu song "Ramanamma" from the film Bumper Offer.

The audio launch was held on January 12, 2016. The audio rights has been bought by Lahari Music.

Track listing
No.	Title	Lyrics	Artist(s)	Length
1.	"Bombdi Bajaaysu"	Yogaraj Bhat	Tippu, Priyadarshini	4:24
2.	"Gandasu Safety Pin(composed by Raghu Kunche)"	V. Nagendra Prasad	Raghu Kunche	4:21
3.	"Ivanobba Olle Huduga"	V. Nagendra Prasad	Ramya NSK	4:04
4.	"Le Le Avnu Nanna Would Be Kane"	V. Nagendra Prasad	Shashank Sheshagiri, Sangeetha Ravindranath	4:10
5.	"Maathella Marethe Hoythu"	Kaviraj	Karthik, Anuradha Bhat	4:11
6.	"Munjaane Suriva Manjali"	Kaviraj	Santhosh Venky, Anuradha Bhat	3:57
