= Vatsalyam =

1993 film by Cochin Haneefa

- DVD cover
- Directed by: Cochin Haneefa
- Written by: A. K. Lohithadas
- Produced by: H.M. Basheer
- Starring: Mammootty; Siddique; Geetha; Sunitha; Aboobacker; Kaviyoor Ponnamma
- Cinematography: K. P. Nambiathiri
- Edited by: K. Sankunni
- Music by: S. P. Venkatesh
- Distributed by: Jubilee Productions
- Release date: 11 April 1993
- Running time: 150 minutes
- Country: India
- Language: Malayalam
- Budget: ₹ 17.8 lakh(est. ₹1.30 crore as of 2024)
- Box office: ₹ 40 lakh(est. ₹3 crore as of 2024)

Vatsalyam (English: Parental love) is a 1993 Indian Malayalam-language family drama film directed by Cochin Haneefa and written by A. K. Lohithadas. It stars Mammootty, Siddique, Geetha, Janardhanan, Sunitha, Ilavarasi, Aboobacker, and Kaviyoor Ponnamma. The film contrasts traditional and modern values following two brothers Raghavan (Mammootty) and Vijayakumaran (Siddique).

== Plot ==
Meledathu Raghavan Nair is the only support of a big family that includes his mother, wife Malathi, brother Vijayakumaran, sister Sudha, uncle Kunjammama and his daughter Nalini. After Raghavan's father's death the whole responsibility of the family came upon Raghavan. His father had left with them huge amount of debts which then reached a stage of attachment from court. At that critical juncture it was Raghavan's uncle Kunjammama who helped them repay the debts by selling his property out of love for Raghavan's father and his family.

Vijayakumaran is studying for LLB. Raghavan has pinged his entire hope on his brother Vijayakumaran and wants to see him as a lawyer. After Vijayakumaran became a lawyer he gets a marriage proposal of a senior advocate's (under whom he practises) daughter Shobha. The marriage takes place contrary to the understanding that it is Nalini (daughter of Kunjammama) who is to marry him. However, before the marriage, regarding this matter there was a small clash between him and his brother Raghavan. Since Raghavan felt that he was not being loyal to Kunjammama's daughter Nalini who were to marry Vijayakumaran, he arranges a marriage for her before his brother's marriage.

After the marriage Shobha tries to dominate the house in each and every matter. There occurs small clashes between her and the family members. Later a marriage proposal for the brothers' only sister Sudha arrives for which the bridegroom's family demand large amount of money and gold. In order to meet this Raghavan had to ask the help of his brother who in turn turns for the same to his wife Shobha. Shobha says that she will give the money on the condition that it will be returned and in the family she will be respected.

One day when the family sit together for meal Raghavan comes in between straight from the fields to dine with them. This irritates Shobha and she tells that it is unhygienic and she cannot stand the bad odour emanating from the mud-filled Raghavan. This in turn infuriates Sudha who sees her elder brother insulted. Shobha who takes Sudha's stand in the situation as threatening tries to evade from her earlier stand to give money for Sudha's marriage. However she is ready to help them if only the entire family is ready to bow before her. This Raghavan sees as an insult to the entire family. He then decides to make the entire money by himself.

In order to do so he pawns his share of the family wealth and finds money for the marriage. Meanwhile, another egoistic encounter of Sobha with Kunjammama forces him to leave the family. When Raghavan also felt that his stay with his brother would only destroy the entire family, he also leaves the family to a new place, find some land and starts farming.

After his brother left Vijayakumaran who is now alienated in the home feels estranged completely. He then meets his father in law (the advocate) who tells him that it was his mistake that he could not control his wife which led to all this. Vijayakumaran then confronts his wife reasons her and slaps her. He then goes to his brother who now stays in a new place and asks him to come back. But Raghavan rejects his brothers request with love and tells him that he is always with him and will come back to home whenever he feels like he should meet his brother. The movie ends with Raghavan cherishing his love for his brother.

== Cast ==
- Mammootty as Meledathu Raghavan Nair
- Siddique as Meledathu Vijayakumaran Nair
- Geetha as Malathi (Malu)
- Sunitha as Sudha
- Ilavarasi as Shobha
- Renuka as Ambika
- Kunchan as Divakaran
- Janardhanan as Ramankutty Menon
- Kaviyoor Ponnamma as Janaki Amma (mother of the 4 siblings)
- Bindu Panicker as Nalini
- Aboobacker as Kunjan Nair (Kunjammama)
- Cochin Haneefa as Bullock Cart Driver- special appearance in the title song Inni Kochu Varambin
- Kozhikode Narayanan Nair as Govindan Nair
- Ottapalam Pappan as Saithalikka
- Kalabhavan Abi as Vinod
- Baby Ambili

=== Crew ===
Voice - Over artist

| Artist | Actress/Actor |
|---|---|
| Anandavally | Geetha |
| Lisy Nass | Ilavarasi |
| Sreeja | Sunitha |
| Ambili | Renuka |

== Release ==
The film was released on 12 April 1993.

=== Box office ===
The film was commercial success, and ran over 100 days in theatres.

== Awards ==
Mammootty received the 1993 Kerala State Film Award for Best Actor for his role in the film.

- The film won Filmfare Award for Best Film – Malayalam received by H. M. Basheer (1993)

== Legacy ==
- The lead character of the film Raghavan Nair and the film is mentioned in the 2020 Malayalam film Kilometers and Kilometers
- Climax episode of 2020-2024 Malayalam TV series Santhwanam season 1 is inspired from the climax of this film.

== Soundtrack ==
The film's soundtrack contains 4 songs, all composed by S. P. Venkatesh and Lyrics by Kaithapram.

| # | Title | Singer(s) |
|---|---|---|
| 1 | "Alayum Kaattin Hrudayam" | K. J. Yesudas |
| 2 | "Thaamarakkannan (F)" | K. S. Chitra |
| 3 | "Inneekkochuvarambin" | K. J. Yesudas, K. S. Chitra |
| 4 | "Thaamarakkannan (M)" | K. J. Yesudas |
