= Sidhartha (1998 film) =

- Directed by: Jomon
- Written by: Sathyanath
- Screenplay by: Sathyanath
- Produced by: Madhavan Nair
- Starring: Mammootty; Jagadish; Rambha; Nedumudi Venu; Thilakan
- Music by: Vidyasagar
- Release date: 19 March 1998
- Country: India
- Language: Malayalam

Sidhartha is a 1998 Indian Malayalam film, directed by Jomon and produced by Madhavan Nair. Story, Screenplay & Dialogues done by Sathyanath. The film stars Mammootty, Anju Aravind, Jagadish, Rambha, Nedumudi Venu and Thilakan in lead roles. The film had musical score by Vidyasagar.

== Cast ==
- Mammootty as Sidharthan main protagonist, Karunakara and Lakshmi's son, Sreedevi stepson, Sethu stepbrother
- Rambha as Hema a medical student, commissioner sister / Siddhartha's love interest
- Thilakan as Raghavan Nair, Karunakara Menon brother-in-law / Balu and Radhika's father
- Jagadish as Pavithran Sidharthan's assistant and brother-like friend.
- Biju Menon as Sethu (Sidharthan's step-brother)
- Nedumudi Venu as Karunakara Menon, Kozhikode mayor, father of Sidhartha and Sethu /
- Anju Aravind as Radhika (Raghavan's daughter)
- Lalu Alex as Commissioner Harishankar, Hema's brother
- Shiju as Balu (Raghavan's son)
- Srividya as Sridevi (Sidharthan's stepmother, Raghavan's sister)
- Mini Nair as Commissioner's wife
- Ponnamma Babu as Lakshmi, Sidharthan's mother / Karunakaran's wife.

== Soundtrack ==
- "Poomanathe Kannippadam" – K. J. Yesudas
- "Alliyambalay" – K. S. Chithra, M. G. Sreekumar
- "Kaivanna Thankamalle (Male)" – Jayachandran
- "Mayikayamam" – K. S. Chithra, Hariharan
- "Kaivanna Thankamalle (Female)" – K. S. Chithra
