= Anaswaram =

- Poster
- Directed by: Jomon
- Written by: T. A. Razzaq
- Produced by: Maniyanpilla Raju
- Starring: Mammootty; Shweta Menon
- Cinematography: Venu
- Music by: Ilaiyaraaja
- Production company: Saraswanthi Chaitanya
- Distributed by: Sreeram Pictures
- Release date: 15 August 1991
- Country: India
- Language: Malayalam

Anaswaram (transl. Immortal) is a 1991 Malayalam-language film directed by Jomon and starring Mammootty and Shweta Menon . This was Shweta Menon's debut movie . The movie was produced by Maniyanpilla Raju under the banner of Sarawathy Chaithanya and was distributed by Sreeram pictures.

== Plot ==
Daniel D’Souza alias Danny breaks out from mental asylum on the Christmas Eve shortly after Immanuel comes to visit him. He goes to a person named Williams and murders him. He goes to Immanuel's house after the murder. When Immanuel is relieved on seeing Danny, Danny reveals that he has escaped the prison to take his revenge on the ones who ruined his life.

The movie goes to a flashback where Immanuel and his daughter Catherine are an Anglo Indian family living with Immanuel's two wheeler workshop. Immanuel dreams of settling his daughter at England with a Britisher someday. Danny and his side kick Tool comes to his workshop one day since he had requested a mutually known church priest to get a good mechanic for him. Danny quickly gets the neglected workshop up and running with customers and profit. However he's always at loggerheads with Catherine since they cannot stand each other. Immanuel is in constant threat from Rajesh and his wayward friends, since Immanuel's house and plot belongs to Rajesh's father the home minister and tries to get the place vacant. Danny and Catherine eventually fall in love after Catherine learns of Danny's troubled past and warm up to him.

After their engagement, Danny and Catherine gets troubled by Rajesh and his friends at a restaurant. Danny who had earlier beaten up Rajesh and his gang because of their issue with Tool, gets violent and trashes them again. On a Christmas night, when Immanuel is drunk asleep and Danny is out to get a present for her, Rajesh and her gang comes and takes away Catherine, stabbing and killing Tool while at it. Danny comes back and finds the dying Tool before pursuing Rajesh and gang. They had chased up Catherine to a multi story building under construction and she eventually jumps down from top fearing any harm from them, resulting in her death. Danny witnesses her death and goes after Rajesh and friends in a fit of rage. However he is apprehended by the police and Rajesh and friends accuses him as a psychopath who had killed Catherine out of doubt and is trying to kill them now. They frame a case against Danny who is convicted of murder and gets admitted to a mental asylum.

Back to the present, it was revealed that Williams was one of Rajesh's gangs. He kills his other 2 friends and finally stabs Rajesh to death. After completing his revenge, He gets back to his mental asylum cell in the end when he proclaims that he will be there now forever.

== Cast ==
- Mammootty as Daniel D'Souza a.k.a. Danny
- Shweta Menon as Catherine
- Innocent as Immanuel Joseph, Catherine's father
- Sukumari
- Kuthiravattam Pappu as Ambadi Ramendran a.k.a. Tool uncle
- Sankaradi
- Appa Haja as Willams
- Kunchan
- Rajesh as Rajesh
- Devan as police officer
- Maniyanpilla Raju

== Songs ==
The movie had two songs written by P. K. Gopi and tuned by Illayaraja. "Tharapadham" (sung by SPB & KS Chithra) was one of the best hit songs of the film.

1. "Kallellam": S. P. Balasubrahmanyam, Malaysia Vasudevan, C. O. Anto
2. "Tharapatham chethoharam": S. P. Balasubrahmanyam, K. S. Chithra
