= Thenmavin Kombath =

1994 film by Priyadarshan

- Promotional advertisement
- Directed by: Priyadarshan
- Written by: Priyadarshan
- Produced by: N. Gopalakrishnan
- Starring: Mohanlal; Shobana; Nedumudi Venu
- Cinematography: K. V. Anand
- Edited by: N. Gopalakrishnan
- Music by: Songs: Berny-Ignatius; Score: S. P. Venkatesh
- Production company: Prasidhi Creations
- Distributed by: Surya Cini Arts; Sudev Release
- Release date: 13 May 1994
- Running time: 165 minutes
- Country: India
- Language: Malayalam

Theanmavin Kombath (transl. On the Branch of a Sweet Honey Mango Tree) is a 1994 Indian Malayalam-language romantic comedy film written and directed by Priyadarshan. It was produced and edited by N. Gopalakrishnan. The film stars Mohanlal, Shobana, and Nedumudi Venu, with Kaviyoor Ponnamma, K. P. A. C. Lalitha, Sukumari, Kuthiravattam Pappu, Sreenivasan, Sankaradi, and Sharat Saxena in supporting roles. The background score was composed by S. P. Venkatesh, while the Berny-Ignatius duo composed the songs. K. V. Anand was the cinematographer.

The film was the highest-grossing Malayalam film of the year. It won two National Film Awards—Best Cinematography for Anand and Best Production Design for Sabu Cyril, and five Kerala State Film Awards (including Best Film with Popular Appeal and Aesthetic Value). Thenmavin Kombath is now considered by audiences and critics to be among the best comedy films in Malayalam cinema.

The film was remade in Tamil as Muthu (1995), in Hindi as Saat Rang Ke Sapne (1998) by Priyadarshan himself and in Kannada as Sahukara (2004).

== Plot ==
The story is about a love triangle involving Manikyan, Sreekrishnan, Karthumpi. Manikyan works as a servant for Sreekrishnan and Sreekrishnan’s older sister Yesodhamma in a village called Srihalli, which is on the Kerala-Karnataka border, but is seen as part of the family by them. Appakaala is also Sreekrishnan’s servant and he secretly hates Manikyan because Manikyan is favored above him by Sreekrishnan.

Once when Manikyan and Sreekrishnan are returning from a fair after shopping, Sreekrishnan sees Karthumpi and gets attracted to her. But then a fight erupts there and they all have to flee. Sreekrishnan flees alone, while Manikyan has to take Karthumpi with him. At night, he flees in the opposite direction and so loses his way in a deep part of Karnataka. Karthumpi knows the way back, but she pretends she does not know it and enjoys the fun. Manikyan has to struggle to get out of that place since he doesn’t speak Kannada but Karthumpi does. Manikyan accidentally says a crude Kannada word to a shop owner, an old lady and also peeks into a room with a married couple without consent. He is tied to a tree as punishment but is later freed when he apologizes. It is Karthumpi who causes Manikyan to land in trouble because he didn't understand what the crude word meant. Karthumpi reveals that she is homeless and that her sister was murdered by a policeman, Mallikettu who is also her brother-in-law. During this time, they develop feelings for each other.

Upon returning to Manikyan's village, Sreekrishnan proposes to her and plans to marry her. Manikyan is unable to resist as Sreekrishnan is like an elder brother to him. But Karthumpi opposes it. When Sreekrishnan gets to know about this via Appakkala, he becomes furious and sees Manikyan as his rival and tries to take revenge. Mallikettu arrives and attacks Sreekrishnan. Manikyan interferes and engages in a duel with the policeman. Manikyan wins the duel. The policeman faints and Manikyan warns him that he would chop his limbs off the next time.

One day, Appakkala finds Sreekrishnan 's flip-flop and towel in the pond and spreads lies that Manikyan has murdered Sreekrishnan. Kannayan, Manikyan’s father, slaps Manikyan, believing the rumor to be true and Yeshodhamma cries upon seeing him as she also believes the rumor to be true. Manikyan also bursts into tears as a result, pleading his innocence. The next morning Manikyan decides to leave the place and Karthumpi accompanies Manikyan feeling sympathy for him. Manikyan runs into Appakala and is furious with Appakkala spreading lies about him. They both engage in a fight. The townsfolk chases Manikyan and Karthumpi through the woods and the water and through a dusty road. Finally, Sreekrishnan appears and everyone stops chasing. Everyone in town realizes that Appakala has fooled them all. He is punished by making him do sit ups in front of everyone. Sreekrishnan realizes his mistakes and marries Karthu, his ex-lover, and also reconciles with Manikyan as he unites with Karthumpi.

== Cast ==
- Mohanlal as Manikyan
- Shobhana as Karthumpi
- Nedumudi Venu as Sreekrishnan Thampuran
- Kaviyoor Ponnamma as Yeshodhamma
- KPAC Lalitha as Karthu
- Sukumari as Ginjimooda Gandhari
- Sreenivasan as Appakkala
- Sankaradi as Kannayyan
- Kuthiravattom Pappu as Chakkutty
- Geetha Vijayan as Chinnu
- Nandu as Thimmayan
- Sonia as Kuyilu
- Khadeeja as Aadivasi
- Sharat Saxena as Mallikkettu
- K. R. Vatsala as Karthumpi's sister

== Soundtrack ==
Thenmavin Kombath

Soundtrack album by Berny-Ignatius
- Released: 13 May 1994 (India)
- Genre: Film soundtrack
- Length: 20:50
- Language: Malayalam
- Labels: Magnasound; Sony Music India

Berny-Ignatius chronology
Kaazhchakkappuram (1992)	Thenmavin Kombath (1994)	Manathe Kottaram (1994)

R. D. Burman was initially signed in as the music composer for the film, as revealed by Burman himself in an interview to journalists in Cochin, during his visit to the city, just a few weeks before his death. But he died before he could complete the compositions of the film and was later replaced by Berny-Ignatius.

Berny-Ignatius was accused for plagiarism for at least three of the songs in the film. The song "Ente Manasinoru Naanam" is said to be an adaptation of the popular Hindi classic "Piya Milanko Jaana", sung by Pankaj Mullick. Another song in the film, "Nila Pongal" is accused to be an imitation of a Bengali song, "Sun Mere Bandhu Re". The "Manam Thelinje vanne" song is a copy of the Ilaiyaraaja song "Aasai Athigam" from the Tamil movie Marupadiyum. Berny-Ignatius were awarded the Kerala State Film Award for Best Music Director despite the allegations, which created a controversy. Veteran music director G. Devarajan returned three of the four state awards he had won claiming that the government was honouring pirates in film music.

All lyrics are written by Girish Puthenchery; all music is composed by Berny-Ignatius.

No.	Title	Artist(s)	Length
1.	"Nila Pongal"	Malgudi Subha	03:31
2.	"Karutha Penne"	M. G. Sreekumar, K. S. Chitra	04:47
3.	"Maanam Thelinge"	M. G. Sreekumar, K. S. Chitra, Sujatha Mohan	04:04
4.	"Kallipoonkuyile"	M. G. Sreekumar	04:17
5.	"Ente Manasinoru"	M. G. Sreekumar, Sujatha Mohan	04:11
Total length:			20:50

== Reception ==
The film ran for more than 250 days in theatres and was the highest-grossing Malayalam film of the year The film is remembered as one of the best comedy films in the history of Malayalam cinema. Film critic Kozhikodan included the film on his list of the 10 best Malayalam movies of all time.

== Awards ==
National Film Awards

- Best Production Design – Sabu Cyril
- Best Cinematographer – K. V. Anand

Filmfare Awards South

- Filmfare Award for Best Actress – Malayalam – Shobhana

Kerala State Film Awards

- Best Film with Popular Appeal and Aesthetic Value
- Best Art Director – Sabu Cyril
- Best Music Director – Berny-Ignatius
- Second Best Actor – Nedumudi Venu
- Second Best Actress – Kaviyoor Ponnamma

Kerala Film Critics Association Awards

- Best Art Director – Sabu Cyril
- Best Editor – N. Gopalakrishnan
- Best Background Score – S. P. Venkatesh

== Remakes ==
The film was remade in Tamil as Muthu (1995), in Hindi as Saat Rang Ke Sapne (1998) by Priyadarshan himself and in Kannada as Sahukara (2004).
