= Chantha =

1995 Indian film

- Poster
- Directed by: Sunil
- Written by: U. A. Khader
- Screenplay by: Robin Thirumala
- Starring: Babu Antony; Thilakan; Sathaar; Augustine
- Cinematography: R. H. Ashok
- Music by: M. Jayachandran
- Production companies: Fax Productions & Release
- Distributed by: Fax Productions & Release
- Release date: 4 August 1995
- Country: India
- Language: Malayalam

Chantha (transl. Marketplace) is a 1995 Indian Malayalam-language action film directed by Sunil and written by Robin Thirumala. The film stars Babu Antony, Thilakan, Sathaar and Augustine. This was the debut film of M. Jayachandran as a music composer.

Chantha was released on 4 August 1995 and became a commercial success at the box office.

== Plot ==
Sekhar Joseph is an honest and upright cop in Kozhikode, who imprisons a corrupt minister Keshavan Nair's nephew Renjith for running over a child in the street due to his drunk driving. Commissioner Ravishankar tries to get Sekhar to release him, but Sekhar refuses. Later, Keshavan Nair visits the station and commends Sekhar for his honest actions, while simultaneously reprimanding Ravishankar. At the city market, Mammali is a shrewd trader, who brings in people from the outside to unload material for his shop against the market's rules. Sulthan is a local ruffian and the leader of the market who confronts Mammali's men and drives them away.

Mammali's partner Ummer Haji, a cunning businessman, tries to influence Sulthan but to no avail. Ummer Haji makes Mammali file a complaint to the police against Sulthan. When Sekhar Joseph tries to arrest Sulthan, he cannot take him away from the market due to stiff opposition from the masses, who regard him as their saviour. Ummer Haji tries to take over a building in the market for his activities, but is humiliated and driven away by Sulthan and his gang. Enraged, Ummer Haji calls for their leader Alexander, who has Mammali stabbed to death by his accomplices and plans to pin the murder on Sulthan. However, this plan is foiled by Merlin Joseph, a reporter and Sekhar Joseph's sister, when she takes a photo of Alexander's henchman stabbing Mammali, thus confirming Sulthan's innocence.

In order to finish Merlin, Alexander and his gang break into Sekhar's home and kill his family by poisoning them. Sekhar goes to question Alexander at his house, where he is beaten by his men and loses one of his legs. Left for dead on the roadside, Sulthan saves Sekhar and takes him to the hospital, where he then saves Sekhar from the doctor, who also tries to kill him on Alexander's orders. Sulthan brings Sekhar to his house, where he slowly starts recovering with Merlin and Sulthan's mother's care. Ummar Haji has an altercation with Keshavan Nair since he is not doing anything in his capacity to move things at the market to Alexander and the gang's favor. To meet his end, he has Renjith humiliate Keshavan Nair at his residence after a press conference by getting a notorious prostitute named Ramlabeevi inside his bedroom and making it public.

Keshavan Nair resigns out of party pressure and goes back to the market where he started his public life. Sulthan and Sekhar capture Ramlabeevi, where they beat and record a confession, but Alexander finishes Ramlabeevi while she is on her way to the court. To further attack Sulthan, Alexander kills his favorite child named Thithibeevi with a time bomb. Sulthan gets enraged and starts killing Alexander's gang, including Renjith and Ummer Haji. The police try to find Sulthan by raiding the market, but are unsuccessful. Alexander murders Keshavan Nair when he unsuccessfully tries to question him about Sulthan's whereabouts. Alexander kidnaps Sultan's mother and sister, where Sulthan finishes Alexander and his men with the help of Sekhar Joseph.

== Cast ==
- Babu Antony as Sulthan
- Thilakan as Keshavan Nair
- Sathaar as Commissioner Ravishanker
- Augustine as Mammali
- Devan as Alexander
- Lalu Alex as CI Sekher Joseph
- Mohini as Merlin Joseph
- Narendra Prasad in a cameo appearance
- Sadiq as Mayinkutty
- Renuka as Sherly
- T. S. Krishnan as Renjith
- Kozhikode Narayanan Nair as P. C. Gopi
- Abu Salim as Williams
- VK Sreeraman as Ummer Haji
- Santhakumari
- Anila Sreekumar as Laila
- Baby Ambili as Thithibeevi
- Bindu Varappuzha as Ramlabeevi

== Soundtrack ==
The music was composed by M. Jayachandran and the lyrics were written by Gireesh Puthenchery. The background score was done by Rajamani.

| No. | Song | Singers | Lyrics | Length (m:ss) |
|---|---|---|---|---|
| 1 | "Kodi Ketti" | M. G. Sreekumar | Gireesh Puthenchery | |
| 2 | "Yatheemin Sulthaan Vanne" | M. G. Sreekumar, CO Anto, chorus | Gireesh Puthenchery | |

== Box office ==
Chantha became the third highest-grossing Malayalam film of the year behind The King and Spadikam.
