= Devaraya (film) =

- Directed by: Rajulapati Venkata Krishna Rao (Nani Krishna)
- Written by: Veerababu Basina
- Screenplay by: Ravireddy Mallu
- Produced by: Kiran Jakkam Shetty; Rajulapati Venkata Krishna Rao (Nani Krishna)
- Starring: Srikanth; Meenakshi Dixit; Vidisha
- Cinematography: Poorna
- Edited by: Naveen Nooli
- Music by: Chakri
- Distributed by: Nani Gadi Cinema; Sunray International Cinema
- Release date: 7 December 2012
- Running time: 131 minutes
- Country: India
- Language: Telugu

Devaraya is a 2012 Indian Telugu-language fantasy-comedy film starring Srikanth, Meenakshi Dixit and Vidisha in the lead roles directed by Nani Krishna and Produced by Kiran Jakkam Shetty & Nani Krishna. Chakri composed the score and soundtrack. The film was released worldwide on 7 December 2012.

== Cast ==
- Srikanth as Sri Krishna Devaraya / Dora Babu
- Meenakshi Dixit as Sunanda
- Vidisha Srivastava as Swapna
- Radha Kumari
- Jaya Prakash Reddy
- M. S. Narayana
- M. Balayya as Mahamamthri Thimmarusu
- Praveen
- Jeeva
- Sivaji Raja
- Ranganath
- Raghu Karumanchi as Dorababu

== Production ==
The film was launched in Hyderabad on 31 August 2011. Srikanth will be seen in a double role of Sri Krishna Devaraya, a famous Indian emperor known for his contributions in terms of arts and literature and Dora Babu, a reckless, irresponsible, hedonistic person in an undistinguished village. Meenakshi Dixit, who was last seen in an item song in Mahesh Babu's Dookudu is playing the female lead in the film. She appears as a princess alongside Srikanth in it and she felt lucky to essay this role. Kanishka Soni sizzled in the item song "Bavlu" in this movie.

== Soundtrack ==
Devaraya

Soundtrack album to Devaraya by Chakri
- Released: 12 September 2012
- Recorded: 2011–2012
- Genre: Feature film soundtrack
- Language: Telugu
- Label: Aditya Music
- Producer: Chakri

Chakri chronology
Srimannarayana (2012)	Devaraya (2012)	Denikaina Ready (2012)

The audio release event of Devaraya was a grand event, which witnessed the presence of Meenakshi Deekshith, Vidisha, Kottaplly Subbaraidu, Prasanna Kumar, Sagar, Tammareddy Bharadwaja, Girish Reddy, Poorna, Sammetta Gandhi, Madhav, Ravi Kumar Chavali, Chakri, Sanvi, Puppala Ramesh, Sivaji Raja, KVV Satyanarayana and many others.

Prominent actor Pawan Kalyan attended the audio launch of Devaraya, which was held at a private auditorium in Hyderabad on 12 September 2012. Pawan Kalyan unveiled the audio CD's amidst huge fanfare and handed it over to AP State minister Ghanta Srinivasa Rao. Later, Pawan Kalyan addressed the music launch function of Devaraya and said that Srikanth is very close to his brother Chiranjeevi and has an extremely high regard for him. He had seen the trailers of the movie and was impressed with it. He wished the entire team good luck and hoped that the music of the film will be a chartbuster.

Tracklist
No.	Title	Lyrics	Artist(s)	Length
1.	"Sri Krishnaraya"	Venigalla Rambabu	Malavika	02:38
2.	"Halale Halale"	Kandikonda	Vinod Kaapu, Adarshini	04:28
3.	"Nickker Vesinappudu"	Paidisetti	Chakri, Anjana Sowmya	04:37
4.	"Bavalu"	Balaji	Neha	03:39
5.	"Guchi Guchi"	Praveen Lakma	Hari, Kousalya	05:37
6.	"Chakkerakeli"	Karunakar	Venu Srirangam, Malavika, Phani, Simha	04:20
7.	"Neerajanam"	Venigalla Rambabu	Kousalya	02:14
