= Veendum Kannur =

- Film poster
- Directed by: K. K. Haridas
- Written by: Robin Thirumala
- Produced by: Latheef Thirur
- Starring: Anoop Menon; Sandhya; Rajeev Pillai
- Cinematography: Jithu
- Edited by: Kapil Gopalakrishnan (Kapil Krishna)
- Music by: Robin Thirumala (songs); Ajith Sukumar (score)
- Production company: Golden Wings International
- Release date: 1 June 2012
- Country: India
- Language: Malayalam

Veendum Kannur is a 2012 Indian Malayalam-language political thriller film directed by K. K. Haridas and written by Robin Thirumala. It is a sequel to the 1997 film Kannur although the characters do not continue. The film stars Anoop Menon, Sandhya, and Rajeev Pillai. Veendum Kannur is about how one man sets out to bring about a revolution in the communist party.

== Plot ==
The film is set in Kannur, a veritable killing field for political rivals of different hues. Jayakrishnan is the son of the Communist Party Secretary Madayi Surendran who is averse to any progress funded by multinational corporations. Jayakrishnan, a Jawaharlal Nehru University product who believes in non violent political ideology, don't like the way politics is practised and had once left the state disheartened with the developments. He is them goes to Agra and works as a guide for the Taj Mahal archaeological department. He returns to Kannur and falls in love with Radhika, who happens to be the daughter of Divakaran, Surendran's biggest political rival. Jayakrishnan's political views and this love affair leads to direct confrontation between the father and his more 'modern' son.

Jayakrishnan, on his return, is given high security because of being the son of the party secretary, but is physically attacked by members of the opposition party on the very day of his arrival, which result in a child losing her limbs in a bomb blast. This flare up the fights between different party members of the district. Jayakrishnan finds his social sensibilities awakened all on a sudden, and he comes up with a unique plan that leads to the birth of the New Communist. Within no time, followers to the New Communist turn up in thousands, and Jayakrishnan faces stringent opposition as well. As the movement gain detractors and supporters from far and wide with his pages in Facebook and Twitter getting tons of hits, Jayakrishnan also opens up his development agenda as he starts to support the fabric corridor project proposed by a young industrialist named Mohit Nambiar which is expected to give a fresh development initiatives for the men of Kannur. The Party fights it while Jayakrishnan offers it all support.

== Cast ==
- Anoop Menon as Jayakrishnan
- Sandhya as Radhika
- Shivaji Guruvayoor as Madayi Surendran
- Rajeev Pillai as Mohit Nambiar (Voice by Mithun Ramesh)
- Riza Bava as Divakaran
- Tini Tom as Sugunan
- Sajitha Betti as Tara
- Arun as Hassan kutty MLA
- Ambika Mohan Madayi Surendran's wife
- Manuraj
- Sadiq
- Zeenath
- Manju Satheesh
- Dimple Rose as Shahina

== Production ==
The film was shot in Kannur, Ernakulam and Ottappallam and completed in about 25 days. Haridas says the message of the film is that success could be achieved only through forgiveness and truth.

== Reviews ==
The film was panned by critics and audiences alike. A review by City Journal said, "If Veendum Kannur is a thriller, it is a lacklustre one, which will neither excite nor move the audience." Aswin J. Kumar of The Times of India said, "Even with the abundance of thriller elements, the movie fails to grip the audience for it relies heavily on Anoop Menon, who is heavily loaded with dialogues which he renders at a rapid pace and with vigour." Paresh C Palicha of Rediff.com gave the film a and said "it is better to watch a re-run of an old film on TV than Veendum Kannur." Veeyen of Nowrunning.com gave the movie a rating and commented, "I thought we were already done with such stale political capers that ruled the roost long, very long back! Looks like that's not the case, unfortunately!" Contrastingly, IBN Live gave the movie an "average" rating and said, "'Veendum Kannur' has some lack luster moments, but manages to qualify for a one time watch."

The film released in about 38 theatres across Kerala on 8 June 2012. In spite of poor reviews from the audiences and critics, the director says the film is doing well and he is planning to release it in another 22 theatres on 15 June. He added that a special screening of the film would soon be conducted for the members of the legislative assembly soon.
