= Charlie Chaplin (1999 film) =

Indian film

- Directed by: P. K. Radhakrishnan
- Written by: P. K. Radhakrishnan; Babu Pallassery (dialogues)
- Screenplay by: Babu Pallassery
- Starring: Prem Kumar; Jagathy Sreekumar; Anju Aravind; Kalpana
- Cinematography: Madhu Adoor
- Edited by: A. P. Joseph
- Music by: Wilson
- Production company: Sreeraj Productions
- Distributed by: Sreeraj Productions
- Release date: 15 October 1999
- Country: India
- Language: Malayalam

Charlie Chaplin is a 1999 Indian Malayalam film, directed by P. K. Radhakrishnan. The film stars Prem Kumar, Jagathy Sreekumar, Anju Aravind and Kalpana in the lead roles. The film has art direction by Kalalayam Ravi and musical score by Wilson. It is loosely based on the Tamil film Tata Birla (1996).

== Cast ==
- Prem Kumar as Charlie
- Jagathy Sreekumar as Chaplin
- Anju Aravind as Nancy Philip
- Kalpana as Chandralekha
- Cochin Haneefa as Albert
- Harishree Ashokan as Bheeman (Chandralekha's brother)
- Mala Aravindan as Achu, driver
- A. C. Zainuddin as Photographer
- Bindu Varappuzha as Vasanthy (Servant)
- Elias Babu as Viswanathan
- Kuthiravattam Pappu as Uncle
- Philomina as Aunty

== Soundtrack ==
The music was composed by Wilson and the lyrics were written by Gireesh Puthenchery.

No.	Song	Singers	Lyrics	Length (m:ss)
1	"Chillamele"	K. S. Chithra	Gireesh Puthenchery	
2	"Kunjumaanpedayo"	M. G. Sreekumar	Gireesh Puthenchery	
3	"Kurukurunnu" [Nila Chandanam] [F]	K. S. Chithra	Gireesh Puthenchery	
4	"Kurukurunnu" [Nila Chandanam] [M]	M. G. Sreekumar	Gireesh Puthenchery	
