= Bhargavacharitham Moonam Khandam =

- Directed by: Jomon
- Written by: Sreenivasan (screenplay); Jomon (story)
- Produced by: Noushad; Najeeb
- Starring: Mammootty; Sreenivasan; Rahman
- Cinematography: Manoj Pillai
- Edited by: P. C. Mohanan
- Music by: Ouseppachan (Background music)
- Release date: 31 August 2006
- Running time: 150 minutes
- Country: India
- Language: Malayalam

Bhargavacharitham Moonam Khandam (transl. The History of Bhargavan, Third Chapter) is a 2006 Indian Malayalam-language action comedy film directed by Jomon starring Mammootty, Sreenivasan and Rahman. The lead characters are inspired by the film Analyze This though the plot is original.

== Synopsis ==
Crime boss Bhargavan goes to see doctor Santharam for his anxiety. The doctor refuses to give him treatment. Bhargavan being desperate, starts living in Santharam's house and starts threatening him. Meanwhile, the news that Santharam is treating Bhargavan gets out. The real culprit behind Bhargavan is Ramanathan, who is the head of narcotic cell. He hears the news and tries to kill Santharam. He has to flee and gets rescued as a worker in the Jumbo Circus, which is then playing in Tamil Nadu. But Bhargavan finds his location with the help of Santhara's assistant and goes there. There, Santharam reveals that it was Bhargavan's conscience that prevented him from doing bad activities. Santharam encourages him to stop all illegal activities and Bhargavan decides to go against his boss and turn into a good man.

== Cast ==
- Mammootty as Current Bhargavan
- Sreenivasan as Dr. Shantharam
- Rahman as CI Vinod
- Padmapriya as Sophia
- Nikita Thukral as Anupama
- Sai Kumar as SP Ramanathan
- Kundara Johny as Kannappan, Bhargavan's Assistant
- Mohan Jose as Jabbar, Bhargavan's Assistant
- Kollam Thulasi as Dhanuvachapuram Dhanapalan, Excise Minister
- Salim Kumar as Ali, Assistant of Shantharam
- Jagadish as Velayudhan, Ringmaster (circus)
- Shamna Kasim as Radhika
- K.P.A.C. Lalitha as Shantharam's Mother
- Adithya Menon as Mariyappan

== Response ==
Sify gave this movie 3/5 rating with a verdict of Disappointing, stating that the film would have been a rocking entertainer if the director and the scriptwriter had stuck to the original. WebIndia123 said this is yet another attempt by Mammootty to succeed in comedy, but it leaves us dissatisfied.
