= Berny–Ignatius =

Berny and Ignatius
- Genres: Film score, soundtrack, theatre, world music, folk music
- Occupations: Music composer, arranger, record producer, instrumentalist
- Instruments: Guitar, electric guitar, hawaii guitar, mandolin, oud, banjo, bulbul tarang, Harmonium, Keyboard, melodica
- Years active: 1981–present

Berny and Ignatius is an Indian musical duo consisting of brothers Berny Puthenveettil and Ignatius Puthenveettil. Primarily working in the Malayalam film industry, they are best known for their work in films such as Thenmavin Kombath, Chandralekha, Kottaram Veettile Apputtan, Kalyanaraman, Chess, and Kaaryasthan. Thenmavin Kombath earned them the Kerala State Film Award for Best Music Director in 1994.

== Biography ==
Born to John Puthenveettil and Treasa, Berny and Ignatius learned music from their father at an early age prior to professionally composing music in 1979. They have composed many hit songs such as Kallipoonguyile, Mayilay Parannu Vaa, Poonilamazha peythirangiya, Kathayile Rajakumaranum, Aavani Ponnoonjal, Thamarappoovil vazhum, Puthumazhayayi vannu, Ponnitta Pettakam, Thechippoove Thenagasi Poove, Oru Kathilola etc.

== Awards ==
Kerala State Film Awards

- 1994 – Best Music Director – Thenmavin Kombath

Kaumudi Awards

- 1994 – Best Music Director – Thenmavin Kombath

Other Awards

- 2011 – Aimfill Inspire award for Best Music Director – Marykkundoru Kunjaadu
- 2010 – Jaycee foundation award for Best Music Director – Kaaryasthan

== Filmography ==
=== As music directors ===
- Aakasha Ganga 2 (2019)
- Welcome to Central Jail (2016)
- Rajadhi Raja (2014)
- Maryade (2014)
- Sringaravelan (2013)
- Climax (2013)
- Cowboy (2012)
- Perinoru Makan (2012)
- Mayamohini (2012)
- Lucky Jokers (2011)
- Marykkundoru Kunjaadu (2010)
- Kaaryasthan (2010)
- Twenty:20 (2008)
- Hareendran Oru Nishkalankan (2007)
- Chess (2006)
- Vettam (2004)
- C. I. Mahadevan 5 Adi 4 Inchu (2004)
- Anuvadhamillathe (2006)
- Thudakkam (2004)
- Pulival Kalyanam (2003)
- Uthara (2003)
- Kalyanaraman (2002)
- Kanalkkireedam (2002)
- Raajapattam (2001)
- The Gift of God (2001)
- Chithrathoonukal (2001)
- Mele Vaaryathe Maaalaakhakkuttikal (2000)
- Priyam(2000)
- Mark Antony (2000)
- India Gate (2000)
- Summer Palace (2000)
- Indriyam (2000)
- Holi (1999)
- Thennaali Raman (1999)
- Aakasha Ganga (1999)
- Pranaya Nilavu (1999)
- Pattabhishekam (1999)
- Swastham Grihabaranam (1999)
- James Bond (1999)
- Manthrimaalikayil Manassammatham (1998)
- Kudumba Vaarthakal (1998)
- Aalibabayum Aarara Kallanmarum (1998)
- Grama Panchayath (1998)
- Kottaram Veettile Apputtan (1998)
- Mayilpeelikkavu (1998)
- Oro Viliyum Kathorthu (1998)
- Kalaapam (1998)
- Sreekrishnapurathe Nakshathrathilakkam (1998)
- Chandralekha (1997)
- Gajaraja Manthram (1997)
- Junior Mandrake (1997)
- Bharatheeyam (1997)
- Raajathanthram (1997)
- Shaanthipuram Thampuraan (1997)
- Ullasapoongattu(1997)
- Kavaadam (1996)
- Vanarasena (1996)
- Vrudhanmare Sookshikkuka (1995)
- Radholsavam (1995)
- Mangalyasoothram (1995)
- Manathe Kottaram (1994)
- Thenmavin Kombath (1994)
- Kaazhchakkappuram (1992)

=== Background score ===
- Abhiyum Njanum
- Malayali
- Chathikkatha Chanthu
