= Anju Aravind =

Indian actress

- Born: 23 July 1978 (age 48); Uruvachal, Mattanur, Kannur district, Kerala
- Occupation: Actress
- Years active: 1995-present
- Parent(s): Aravindakshan, K.T. Kanchana

Anju Aravind is an Indian actress who has acted in Malayalam, Tamil and Kannada films. In early 2000's she shifted her focus to Malayalam TV serials and shows in supporting to character roles.

== Filmography ==
Films

Year	Film	Role	Language	Notes
1995	Aksharam	Usha	Malayalam	
1995	Parvathy Parinayam	Lakshmi	Malayalam	
1996	Poove Unakkaga	Nandhini	Tamil	
1996	Enakkoru Magan Pirappan	Shanthi	Tamil	
1996	Azhakiya Ravanan	Sandhya	Malayalam	
1996	Swapna Lokathe Balabhaskaran	Mohini	Malayalam	
1996	Vanarasena	Ammini	Malayalam	
1997	Arunachalam	Arundhati	Tamil	
1997	Once More	Anju	Tamil	
1998	Udhavikku Varalaamaa	Aisha	Tamil	
1998	Aasai Thambi	Indhu	Tamil	
1998	Sidhartha	Radhika	Malayalam	
1998	Aalibabayum Aarara Kallanmarum	Sunitha	Malayalam	
1998	Gurupaarvai	Priya	Tamil	
1999	Unnaruge Naan Irundhal	Herself	Tamil	
1999	Janumadatha	Nisha	Kannada	
1999	Charlie Chaplin	Nancy	Malayalam	
2000	Vanathai Pola	Sumathi	Tamil	
2001	Vaanchinathan	Sharada	Tamil	
2001	Dhosth	Devika	Malayalam	
2001	Love Channel	Shanthi	Tamil	
2001	Kanna Unnai Thedukiren	Bhavani	Tamil	
2003	Melvilasam Sariyanu	Nandhini	Malayalam	
2005	Naran	Sainabha	Malayalam	
2011	Three Kings	—N/a	Malayalam	Dubbed for (Sandhya); Character -Manju
2013	Sringaravelan	Revathy	Malayalam	
2014	Konthayum Poonoolum	Alice	Malayalam	
2014	God's Own Country	Mathan's wife	Malayalam	
2014	Avatharam	Leelamma	Malayalam	
2014	Ormayundo Ee Mukham	Bhanu	Malayalam	
2015	Mili	Thara	Malayalam	
2015	1000 – Oru Note Paranja Katha	Rescued lady	Malayalam	
2015	Jamna Pyari	Parvathy's mother	Malayalam	
2015	Pathemari	Pushpa	Malayalam	
2016	Swarna Kaduva	Actress Geethu Nair	Malayalam	
2016	Athijeevanam	Annie	Malayalam	
2017	Achayans	Aleena	Malayalam	
2018	Nithyaharitha Nayakan	Geetha	Malayalam	
2020	Bhoomiyile Manohara Swakaryam	Sainu	Malayalam	
2023	Avakashikal		Malayalam	
2023	KL 58 S-4330 Ottayan		Malayalam	
2025	Jagala		Malayalam	

== TV serials ==
Malayalam

Year	Serial	Channel	Notes
2023	Sudhamani Supera	Zee keralam	as Sudhamani
2017	Kasthooriman	Asianet	as Sulochana
2016	Kayamkulam Kochunniyude Makan	Surya TV	
2013-2014	Oridathoridathu	Asianet	as Charulatha teacher
2004	Kadamattathu Kathanar	Asianet	as Bhanumathi

=== Tamil ===
- Azhagiya Tamil Magal as Saroja
- Aathira as Mangalam
- Micro Thodar Macro Sinthanaigal - Ayirathil Oruvanum Nooril Oruthiyum as Vidya
