= Unnathangalil =

2001 film

- Directed by: Jomon
- Screenplay by: Robin Thirumala
- Story by: Jomon
- Produced by: A. G. Abraham
- Starring: Lal; Manoj K. Jayan; Poornima Indrajith
- Cinematography: Anandakuttan
- Edited by: J. Murali Narayan
- Music by: Mohan Sithara; C. Rajamani (Score)
- Production company: JMJ Productions
- Release date: 21 December 2001
- Country: India
- Language: Malayalam

Unnathangalil (transl. At the peaks) is a 2001 Indian Malayalam-language action drama film directed by Jomon and written by Robin Thirumala from a story by Jomon starring Lal, Manoj K. Jayan, and Poornima Indrajith, while Mohanlal makes a cameo appearance. The original songs were composed by Mohan Sithara while the background score was provided by C. Rajamani.

== Plot ==
Two childhood buddies find themselves going head-to-head with each other due to their greedy desires.

== Cast ==
- Lal as Shiva
- Manoj K. Jayan as Michael, Shiva's Friend
- Poornima Indrajith as Julie, Michael's Sister and Shiva's Love Interest
- Indraja as Helen, Michael's Love Interest and Wife
- Sai Kumar as Antony, Helen's Father
- N. F. Varghese as Thankavelu / Velu Bhai, Antony's Boss
- Jagadish as Seban, Shiva and Michael's Friend
- Augustine as Panicker , Antony's Helper and Assistant
- Sadiq as MLA Raghuraman, Antony and Velu Bhai's Partner
- Mala Aravindan as Josephettan
- Abu Salim as Prabhu, Antony's Henchman
- Geetha Vijayan as Salomi
- Kochaniyan as Cyriac Master, Michael's Father
- Bindu Ramakrishnan as Michael's Mother
- Mamukkoya as Mammu
- Joemon Joshy as Michael’s Childhood
- Babu Antony as Goonda (Cameo appearance)
- Mohanlal as Nomad (Cameo appearance)

== Soundtrack ==
The original songs were composed by Mohan Sithara, and the lyrics were by Gireesh Puthenchery. The background score was provided by C. Rajamani.

Number	Song	Singer
1	"Nakshathrangal Thilangum" (Female)	Ranjini Jose
2	"Nakshtrangal Thilangum"	K. J. Yesudas
3	"Muthani Munthiri Vallikal"	K. J. Yesudas, K. S. Chithra
4	"Manippanthalil"	M. G. Sreekumar, Chorus, Ranjini Jose, Smitha
5	"Muthani Munthiri Vallikal" (Male)	K. J. Yesudas

== Box office ==
The film was a box office failure. A non-bailable arrest warrant was issued to director, Jomon, after he failed to repay the Nilambur Rajeshwari Talkies owner for screening the film.
