= Janumadatha =

- Poster
- Directed by: T. S. Nagabharana
- Written by: Doddahullur Rukkoji
- Screenplay by: T. S. Nagabharana
- Produced by: K. Musthafa
- Starring: Shiva Rajkumar; Anju Aravind; Sarath Babu; Ambika
- Cinematography: B. C. Gowrishankar
- Edited by: T. Shashikumar
- Music by: V. Manohar
- Production company: Baba Productions
- Release date: 15 January 1999
- Running time: 139 minutes
- Country: India
- Language: Kannada

Janumadatha is a 1999 Indian Kannada-language film directed by T. S. Nagabharana and produced by K. Musthafa. The film stars Shiva Rajkumar, Anju Aravind, Sarath Babu and Ambika. The film's musical score was by V. Manohar. The film is based on the Academy Award-winning Dutch film Character (1997).

== Plot ==
Set across multiple decades, the film opens with Thejas stabbing renowned educationist and former police officer Srichandra Vidyasagar, in 1998. In view of Vidyasagar's stature, the government constitutes a three-member judicial committee to investigate the incident and recommend punishment. During the inquiry, Thejas narrates the events that led to the crime.

In 1972, Vidyasagar meets Ahalya, a journalist and activist campaigning for women's rights. Inspired by her ideals, he becomes an advocate for the cause and frequently addresses public forums. During a journey undertaken by the group, circumstances force them to halt overnight. In a moment of moral failure, Vidyasagar sexually assaults Ahalya. Filled with remorse, he offers to marry her, but Ahalya rejects the proposal, believing it stems from guilt rather than love, and resolves to raise their unborn child independently. By 1985, Ahalya has settled in Udupi as a nurse with her son, Thejas. Vidyasagar, now serving as a police officer in the town, attempts reconciliation, but Ahalya remains firm. Around the same time, she saves the life of the wounded fugitive Sadhu Prakash, nursing him back to health.

By 1992, Thejas has grown into a bright law student under the guidance of retired teacher Victor Verghese. He gains admission to Dr. Akbar Ali's Mahatma Gandhi Memorial Institute, where Vidyasagar occupies a senior administrative position. Though Vidyasagar knows Thejas is his son, he keeps the truth hidden and subjects him to strict scrutiny. Prakash comes to live with Ahalya and Thejas and becomes close to the family. Unknown to Thejas, however, Prakash is a member of the revolutionary DownTrodden War Group (DTWG), which seeks social justice through armed struggle. Under the guise of a book agency established to support Ahalya financially, Prakash circulates revolutionary literature and conceals weapons. When these are discovered, Thejas is arrested but later released on bail through Dr. Ali's intervention.

In 1995, Thejas works part-time at the institute while pursuing his studies. During the institute's silver jubilee celebrations attended by prominent dignitaries, the DTWG launches an attack, resulting in a police encounter that claims several lives, including that of Verghese. Prakash, Nagaraj and others are arrested. Meanwhile, Nisha, the sister of Nagaraj, develops feelings for Thejas, but he declines her proposal. Concerned that emotional attachments may distract him, Vidyasagar keeps Nisha away and urges Ahalya to ensure Thejas remains focused on his future. Two years later, Thejas has completed his education excelling academically, and seeks appointment as secretary of the institute. However, during the interview, Vidyasagar insists that the selection panel inquire about his father's identity, arguing that the post requires a candidate of known background. Humiliated and frustrated by years of unanswered questions, Thejas confronts Ahalya. Unable to bear her anguish, he blames Vidyasagar for their suffering and fatally stabs him.

When Thejas returns home, he finds Ahalya dead, clutching a note revealing that Vidyasagar was his father and apologizing for concealing the truth. Back in the present, the committee is presented with Vidyasagar's will, in which he declares that he had taken his own life, thereby absolving Thejas of criminal responsibility. The document reveals that Vidyasagar had deliberately challenged Thejas throughout his life to make him resilient and worthy of success. Bequeathing all his property to his son, Vidyasagar entrusts Thejas with his legacy. The committee clears Thejas of wrongdoing, and Dr. Akbar Ali hands over the administrative reins of the institute to him.

== Cast ==
- Shiva Rajkumar as Thejas
  - Ashwin as young Thejas (credited as Master Ashwin)
- Anju Aravind as Nisha
- Sarath Babu as Srichandra Vidyasagar
- Ambika as Ahalya
- Loknath as Victor Verghese
- Girish Karnad as Dr. Akbar Ali
- Mandya Ramesh as Nagaraj
- Harish Rai as Sadhu Prakash
- Jyothi as activist
- R. G. Vijayasarathy as a judge on the committee
- Hulivan Gangadharaiah as advocate
- Shankhanada Anjanappa as constable
- L. N. Simha
- Pranaya Murthy as Constable Ramachandra
- Yamuna Shetty
- T. S. Nagabharana as man in hospital (uncredited)
- Suresh Mangalore as MGM Board member (uncredited)

== Soundtrack ==
Janumadatha

Soundtrack album by V. Manohar
- Released: 22 January 1999
- Recorded: 1998
- Genre: Soundtrack
- Length: 27:40
- Label: Akash Audio
- Producer: V. Manohar

V. Manohar chronology
Deveeri (1999)	Janumadatha (1999)	Swasthik (1999)

The background music and soundtrack for the film was scored by V. Manohar. The soundtrack album consists of six tracks, and was distributed by Akash Audio.

Track listing
No.	Title	Lyrics	Singer(s)	Length
1.	"Aa Vidhaathana Varavide"	V. Manohar	Dr. Rajkumar	4:41
2.	"Dennana Dennanaa"	V. Manohar	Shankar Mahadevan	5:16
3.	"Chandira Chandira"	B. R. Lakshmana Rao	K. S. Chithra	4:15
4.	"Rangana Thittu"	Pratibha Nandakumar	Anuradha Sriram	4:53
5.	"Saagara Theeradi"	B. S. Madhumathi	Rajesh Krishnan, Sangeetha Katti	4:32
6.	"Bombu Haako Desha"	V. Manohar	Rajesh Krishnan	4:03
Total length:				27:40

== Reception ==
Srikanth Srinivasa of Deccan Herald gave the film a mixed review. He felt that the film's "subject that has been told umpteen number of times, yet you get a feeling that the film has been given fresh treatment." However, he felt that "it fails to create an impact." On the acting performances, he wrote, "Shiva Rajkumar seems to be improving with every film and his dialogue delivery is also good. However, Ambika steals the show. Sharat Babu, who has performed equally well, does have some initial hiccups with pronunciation of Kannada words. Girish Karnad and Lokanath are wasted." He concluded calling it "[a]n above average film".
