= Red Indians (film) =

1999 film directed by Sunil

- Directed by: Sunil
- Screenplay by: Sankaranarayanan
- Story by: Sunil
- Dialogues by: Sunil
- Produced by: Bachan; Kunjumon
- Starring: Vijayaraghavan; Vikram; Preetha Vijayakumar
- Cinematography: Tony
- Edited by: P. C. Mohanan
- Music by: S. P. Venkatesh
- Production companies: M & M International
- Distributed by: M & M Release
- Release date: 16 December 1999
- Running time: 173 minutes
- Country: India
- Language: Malayalam

Red Indians is a 1999 Indian Malayalam-language action thriller film directed by Sunil and written by Sankaranarayanan from a story by Sunil. It stars Vijayaraghavan, Vikram and Preetha Vijayakumar.

== Plot ==
A forest smuggler named Wayanadan, lives in the jungle and smuggles sandalwood. He is also involved in other anti-social behaviour and forest crimes like robberies, dacoity, murders and drug peddling. He consequently kidnaps an electrician, Rahul, and takes him to the jungle, forcing him to teach him to make explosives. Rahul refuses to help create bombs and is subsequently falsely accused of murder. The rest of the story is about how Rahul proves his innocence to police investigators.

== Cast ==
- Vijayaraghavan as ACP Ravisankar IPS
- Preetha Vijayakumar as Preetha
- Vikram as Rahul
- Mohan Raj as Hyder Marakkyar
- Charanraj as Jacky/Jackson
- Vimalraj as Kazhuku Maruthu
- Baburaj as Jumbo Sankar
- Abu Salim as Pokken
- Mansoor Ali Khan as Wayanadan
- Captain Raju as Commissioner
- Manjula Vijayakumar as Matha Mayadevi
- Devan as CI Harisankar
- Suvarna Mathew as Maya Harisankar
- Prathapachandran as Dr. Madhavadas
- Alphonsa as Item dancer

Tamil version

- Vivek as Rajadurai
- Sekar P. R. as Unni
- Benjamin as Arokiya Bhavan hotel worker
- Dhinamdhorum Nagaraj as Ezhumalai
- Dhadi Balaji
- Bhavana as Unni's lover
- Adithyan
- Sathyaraj and Rambha as cameo appearance in song "Izhutha Izhuthu"

== Soundtrack ==
Malayalam version

Soundtrack was composed by S. P. Venkatesh.

- "Hoyyare Hoyyare" - Sujatha, Sindhu
- "I Love You" - Anuradha Sriram, Sriram
- "Kannadipuzha" - Biju Narayanan
- "Pakalmazha Pozhiyumoru" - Chithra, Unnikrishnan

Tamil version

Tamil version contains new set of songs composed by Adithyan.

- "Gang Gang" - Yugendran
- "Elukondala" - Manikka Vinayagam
- "Izhutha" - Lavanya
- "Bhangra" - Malgudi Subha

== Release ==
The film was originally released in Malayalam in December 1999; later it was dubbed and re-released in Tamil as Thilak with two reshot songs and a comedy track featuring Vivek in June 2004. It was also dubbed and released in Telugu under the same name.
