= Bharanakoodam =

1994 Indian film

- Directed by: Sunil
- Written by: Sab John
- Produced by: V. Varghese
- Starring: Babu Antony; Geetha
- Cinematography: Dinesh Babu; Sanjeev Shankar
- Edited by: P. C. Mohanan
- Production company: Surya Creators
- Distributed by: Star Plus Release
- Release date: 1994
- Country: India
- Language: Malayalam

Bharanakoodam (transl. Government) is a 1994 Indian Malayalam-language political action film directed by Sunil from a story by Sab John and produced by V. Varghese. The film stars Babu Antony and Geetha in the lead roles.

== Synopsis ==
Danny is the nephew of a leader named Alexander who is framed for killing CM Damodara Menon. Danny escapes from custody and sets out to prove his innocence after learning that a political kingmaker named Devaraj is behind Damodara's death.

== Cast ==
- Babu Antony as Dany
- Geetha as Manju
- Narendra Prasad as Devaraj
- Lalithasree as Excise Minister Parukutty
- Vijayaraghavan as P. K. Raghavan
- Rajan P Dev as Alexander
- Sukumaran as Commissioner/IG Venugopal IPS
- Vijayan as Tamil Nadu Minister
- Beena Antony as Mini
- Janardanan as Minister Aravindakshan
- Kuthiravattam Pappu as Minister Paaraadan
- M. G. Soman as C. M. Damodhara Menon
- KPAC Sunny as Minister
- Shammi Thilakan as CI Sojan
- Santha Devi as Manju's maid
- Augustine as Minister Suresh Chambakulam
- Ravi Jack as Lawrence D'Souza
- Kozhikode Narayanan Nair as Member of Ministry
- Abu Salim as Abu
- T. S. Krishnan as Indran
- Priyanka as Neeli
- Bindu Varappuzha as Party Member
- Tony as Alexander's assistant
- Pavithran as Party Member
- Swapna Ravi as Commissioner's wife
