= Highway (1995 film) =

- Pre-release poster
- Directed by: Jayaraj
- Screenplay by: Sab John
- Story by: Jayaraj
- Produced by: Prem Prakash
- Starring: Suresh Gopi; Banupriya; Vijayaraghavan; Janardhanan; Sukumari
- Cinematography: P. Sukumar
- Edited by: B. Lenin; V. T. Vijayan
- Music by: S. P. Venkatesh
- Production company: Heyday Films
- Distributed by: Century Release
- Release date: 3 March 1995 (India)
- Running time: 146 minutes
- Country: India
- Language: Malayalam

Highway is a 1995 Indian Malayalam-language action spy film directed by Jayaraj, produced by Prem Prakash, and written by Sab John. The film stars Suresh Gopi and Bhanupriya, with Vijayaraghavan, Janardhanan and Biju Menon in supporting roles. The film's original songs were composed by S. P. Venkatesh, while cinematography was handled by P. Sukumar.

Highway was released in theatres on 3 May 1995. It was a commercial success at the Kerala box office. The film's dubbed Telugu version was also a box office success in Andhra Pradesh.

== Plot ==
Sreedhar Prasad is a RAW field agent investigating a bomb blast that killed 30 innocent college students. Sreedhar operates under the name of Mahesh Aravind, a planter from Udumbanchola and chooses a township, Wintergreen, as his temporary residence during the course of the investigation. Mahesh establishes a friendly relation with ACP George Alexander, who was the official in charge of the criminal investigation. As the investigation proceeds, it is understood that the bomb blast was connected with a chain of crimes that happened in the area including the missing of a scientist Guhan Menon from Baddapur Space Research Organization (BSRO), who is later revealed to be killed. It is revealed that Shankar Dev Rana, an established businessman and educationist in the common front, is actually a traitor and drug lord in his parallel life. Sreedhar Prasad and his subordinate Moorthy finally solves the cases after hurdles and arrest Shankar Dev Rana for orchestrating the bomb blast.

== Cast ==
- Suresh Gopi as Sreedhar Prasad IPS/Mahesh Aravind (RAW officer)
- Bhanupriya as Meera
- Vijayaraghavan as Moorthy/Unnithaan (RAW Officer)
- Janardhanan as ACP George Alexander IPS
- Biju Menon as SI Pavithran
- Jose Prakash as Kartha (Meera's father)
- Augustine as Sukumaran/Sukhbir (Hanuman) Singh
- Kunchan as Vasco
- Sukumari as Vasco's mother
- Eliyas Babu as Shankar Dev Rana/Murikkummuri Velayudhan (Real name, revealed in the climax)
- Kamal Gaur as 'Cobra' Hamza, Chief Henchman of Shankar Dev Rana
- Spadikam George as IG Ramamurthy IPS
- Vineeth as Vinod Menon/Apache (One among the students who gets killed in the blast)
- Prem Prakash as Sivanandan, Fabrication Engineer, BSRO
- Kaduvakkulam Antony as Kallu Vareeth, Checkpost Registrar
- Pavithran K P as Robinson, Motel Manager and Rana's agent
- Silk Smitha as Dancer

== Music ==
Highway

Soundtrack album by S. P. Venkatesh
- Genre: Film soundtrack
- Length: 22:56
- Label: Magnasound; Sony Music India

The soundtrack album was composed by S. P. Venkatesh for the lyrics penned by Gireesh Puthenchery.

Track	Song title	Singer(s)	Length
1	Dolo Dolakku	K. S. Chithra, Mano	4:53
2	Oru Thari Kasthoori	Swarnalatha, Chorus	5:15
3	Kikkili Kili	Malgudi Subha, Sangeetha Sajith	4:07
4	Kunji Kurumbin	K. S. Chithra, Chorus	4:51
5	Adipoli	Suresh Peters	3:49

== Box office ==
The film was a commercial success in Kerala and also in Andhra Pradesh. According to producer Khader Hassan, it created pre-release hype in Andhra Pradesh due to the successes of Suresh Gopi's previous dubbed films, and after the success of Highway, older Malayalam films in which he appeared in supporting roles too were released in the Tamil and the Telugu industries.

== Sequel ==
A sequel to the film titled Highway 2 was announced in 2022.
