= Lucky Jokers =

- Directed by: Sunil
- Written by: Saju Kodiyan
- Produced by: D. Ramesh Babu
- Starring: Anoop Menon; Madhu; Ajmal Ameer; Suraj Venjaramoodu; Jagadeesh; Harishree Ashokan
- Cinematography: Bharani K. Dharan
- Edited by: P. C. Mohanan
- Music by: M. Jayachandran; Berny-Ignatius
- Production company: Aascar Film Pvt. Ltd
- Distributed by: Aascar Film Pvt. Ltd
- Release date: 29 April 2011
- Country: India
- Language: Malayalam

Lucky Jokers is a 2011 Malayalam-language comedy film written by Saju Kodiyan, directed by Sunil, and produced by D. Ramesh Babu under the banner of V. Ravichandran's Aascar Films. The cast includes Anoop Menon, Ajmal Ameer, Suraj Venjaramoodu, Jagathy Sreekumar, Jagadeesh, Harishree Ashokan, Madhu, Janardhanan, Vidisha, Indrans and Jaffar Idukki. The film was released in theatres on 29 April 2011.

== Cast ==
- Anoop Menon as Thalikulam Vishnu Sharman
- Madhu as Valiya Thampuran
- Ajmal Ameer as Vishal
- Suraj Venjaramoodu in a dual role as:
  - Pitambaran (Sanyasin Himagirisringan)
  - Narasimha Gounder
- Jagathy Sreekumar as Krishnavarma Thampuran
- Jagadeesh as Pisharadi
- Janardhanan as Madhava Varma Thampuran
- Harishree Ashokan as Vijayan
- Vidisha Srivastava as Lakshmi Thampuratty
- Indrans as Thamarakshan
- Jaffar Idukki
- Saju Kodiyan
- Sai Kumar as Surya Varma
- Jayan Cherthala as Sekhara Varma
- Sreelatha Namboothiri as Chithira Thampuratti
- Zeenath as Parvathy Thampuratti
- Nimisha as Deepa Thamburatti
- Subi Suresh in a dual role as:
  - Ratnam
  - Yakshi
- Kulappulli Leela as Servant
- Meenakshi
- Kaushik Babu in Special appearance in a song
- Manakkad Ravi
- KPAC Saji as Vishal's father
- Kalabhavan Shajohn
- Dinesh Panicker
- Kishor

== Production ==
Lucky Jokers is the first Malayalam film from Aascar Films. The film was shot in Kerala, Nepal and Malaysia. The film was to mark the Malayalam debut of Prasanna and Vadivelu but they did not feature.

== Soundtrack ==
- "Ennum Ninne Kaanaan" - Alphonse Joseph, Jyotsna Radhakrishnan
- "Madhuram Madhuram" - KJ Yesudas, Sindhu Bhairavi
- "Puliyeppole Cheerippaayum" - Anwar Sadath
- "Vennilaa Thankamani" - Subin Ignatious
