= Saat Rang Ke Sapne =

- Directed by: Priyadarshan
- Written by: Dialogues: Suraj Sanim
- Screenplay by: Priyadarshan
- Story by: Priyadarshan
- Based on: Thenmavin Kombath
- Produced by: Amitabh Bachchan
- Starring: Arvind Swamy; Juhi Chawla
- Cinematography: Ravi K. Chandran
- Edited by: A. Sreekar Prasad
- Music by: Songs: Nadeem-Shravan; Score: Amar Mohile; Anil Mohile
- Production company: Amitabh Bachchan Corporation Limited
- Distributed by: Eros Entertainment
- Release date: 20 February 1998
- Country: India
- Language: Hindi

Saat Rang Ke Sapne (transl. The dreams of seven colours) is a 1998 Indian Hindi-language drama film directed by Priyadarshan and produced by Amitabh Bachchan. It is a remake of Priyadarshan's own 1994 Malayalam film Thenmavin Kombath. The film stars Arvind Swamy (in his Bollywood debut) and Juhi Chawla. The film was a box office failure.

== Plot ==
Forced into marriage with a mentally deranged man, Yashoda gives birth to a child, only to have her husband kill himself and the child, leaving her devastated and alone. This leaves her brother, Bhanu angry and bitter at this loss, and he swears to avenge this humiliation. His vengeance is satisfied every year when he asks his employee and close friend, Mahipal to run a bullock-cart race and defeat his sister's in-laws, and every year Mahipal wins. Bhanu, in his mid-forties, has not married yet, although he used to actively woo a village belle, who still has feelings for him. One day Bhanu and Mahipal give a ride in their bullock-cart to a couple, Baldev and his sister Jalima, who are travelling and performing gypsies. During this ride, Bhanu hopelessly falls in love with Jalima, on one hand, and Mahipal wants to ditch the couple midway, as he does not like them.

== Cast ==
- Arvind Swamy .... Mahipal Sharma
- Juhi Chawla .... Jalima
- Anupam Kher .... Bhanu
- Farida Jalal .... Yashoda
- Satish Shah .... Baldev
- Tinu Anand .... Prahlad Sharma (Mahipal's Dad)
- Sukumari .... Rampyari Devi, Yashoda's sister in law
- Mink Singh .... Bhanvari
- Aruna Irani
- Geetha Vijayan ....Mahipal's younger sister
- Govind Namdev....Pongad
- Khadeeja ....Tribal lady
- Mukesh Rishi ....Bhupat, a ruthless policeman, Jalima's brother-in law - who wants to marry her, had murdered his first wife
- Kanya Bharathi .... Rampyari Devi's daughter
- K. R. Vatsala .... Jalima's sister

== Soundtrack ==
All the songs were composed by Nadeem Shravan and were penned by Sameer. The song "Saat Rang Ke Sapne" is based on "Poovenam" from Oru Minnaminunginte Nurunguvettam.

#	Title	Singer(s)	Duration
1	"Saat Rang Ke Sapne"	M. G. Sreekumar, Alka Yagnik	04:56
2	"Aati Hai To Chal"	Babul Supriyo, Alka Yagnik	06:19
3	"Jhoot Bol Na Sach Baat Bol De"	Udit Narayan	04:28
4	"Dilon Ka Haal"	Babul Supriyo, Priya Bhattacharya	04:54
5	"Mujh Pe Bhi Jawani"	Kavita Krishnamurthy, Kunal Ganjawala	05:53
6	"Ba Ba Batao Na"	Babul Supriyo, Alka Yagnik	04:15

== Reception ==
Komal Nahta of Film Information wrote "Saat Rang Ke Sapne has form (colours, beautiful locations, excellent photography) but its content is far from satisfactory and its undue length, too disturbing". Anupama Chopra of India Today wrote ″Priyan captures a few powerful moments but an inconsistent characterisation and a clunky plot progression hobble the film. Unlike Kamalahasan's powerful Thevar Magan script which inspired Viraasat, SRKS is unnecessarily convoluted and too dependent on unfortunate coincidences. The incessant tourist brochure-style scenery also begins to pall after sometime.″ Screen wrote "If the whole of Saat Rang Ke Sapne was the usual average Hindi film, we might have overlooked the glitches but because the film is far superior, the flaws stand out glaringly".
