= Sab John =

Indian screenwriter and actor

- Born: John Edathattil
- Occupations: Screenwriter; actor
- Years active: 1989–present

Sab John is an Indian screenwriter and actor who works in Malayalam and Tamil-language films. He is known for his work in the films Chanakyan (1989), Gunaa (1991) and Soorya Manasam (1992)

== Career ==
Sab John made his debut as a writer with the thriller film Chanakyan (1989). The story of the film was created in 18 days and he wrote a 450-page script for the film with director T. K. Rajeev Kumar. He made his Tamil debut the following year with the romantic film Gunaa. After writing the scripts for several Malayalam films including Vyooham (1990) and Gandhari (1992), he returned to Tamil cinema with Sillunu Oru Kadhal (2006).

== Filmography ==
=== As a writer ===
- Chanakyan (1989)
- Kshanakkathu (1990)
- Vyooham (1990)
- Gunaa (1991) (Tamil)
- Soorya Manasam (1991)
- Gandhari (1992)
- Bharanakoodam (1994)
- Highway (1995)
- Mayilpeelikkavu (1998)
- Priyam (2000)
- Sillunu Oru Kadhal (2006) (Tamil)
- Sivappu Mazhai (2010) (Tamil)

=== As an actor ===
- Kuruthipunal (1995) (Tamil)
- Sathyameva Jayathe (2000)
