= Vidisha Srivastava =

Indian television actress

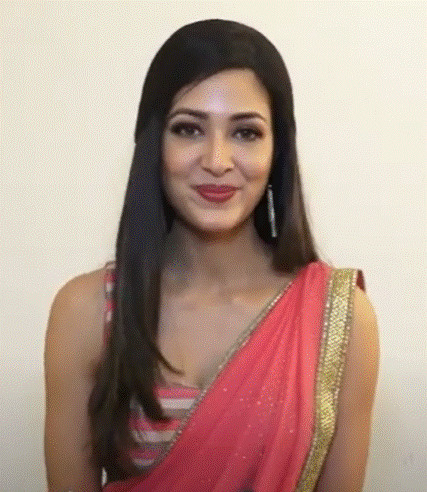
- Born: 28 April 1988 (age 38); Varanasi, Uttar Pradesh, India
- Occupation: Actress
- Years active: 2004–present
- Spouse: Sayak Paul (m. 2016)
- Children: 1
- Relatives: Shanvi Srivastava (sister)

Vidisha Srivastava is an Indian actress who primarily appears in Telugu films and Hindi television. She is known for playing Anita Mishra in Bhabiji Ghar Par Hain!.

== Early life ==
Vidisha hails from Varanasi, Uttar Pradesh. She has one elder brother and one younger sister actress Shanvi Srivastava. She graduated with a degree in biotechnology and did a course in business management.

== Career ==
Vidisha was an aspiring actor but started her career as a model. She made her television debut at 16 with Chaudah Phere in 2004, A Doordarshan Serial in which she played the lead character.

She made her film debut at 19 in SP Entertainments's Maa Iddari Madhya. In 2007, she had three releases in early 2007, Alaa, Prem and in E. V. V. Satyanarayana's Athili Sattibabu LKG, out of which Athili Sattibabu LKG was a hit. Oneindia in its Alaa review wrote that Vidisha "looked gorgeous and she is the only saving grace adding to the film the glamour quotient of the film". About her performance in Athili Sattibabu LKG, Sify wrote, "Vidisha is superb in dance sequences and proved her mettle as a good dancer. She also has enough scope to display her talents". Similarly, Indiaglitz wrote, "Vidisha had performed well, besides filling the glamour slot".

Later in 2007 she made her Kannada debut in Nali Naliyutha (2007). The Times of India wrote, "Vidisha is a perfect choice for the role", while Rediff wrote that she "is yet to learn what acting is all about though she looks glamorous". Her first Tamil film was Kathavarayan, released in 2008 and her first Malayalam film Lucky Jokers released in 2011. She returned to Telugu cinema in 2012 with Devaraya and 123telugu.com wrote that she was good and "may have some future in the industry if she takes care of her projects". She also worked in a Kannada film, Viraat, again.

After 13 years, She returned to television with Yeh Hai Mohabbatein as Roshni Bhalla in 2017. Later in 2019 she played the role of Ratri Gujral in Meri Gudiya which gone off air in 2020, due Covid 19 Outbreak in India. She also played the role of Sita in Shrimad Bhagwat Mahapuran and Devi Parvati in Kahat Hanuman Jai Shri Ram 2020 and Durga – Mata Ki Chhaya in 2021 and Shiu Krishna Joshi in Kashibai Bajirao Ballal from 2021 to 2022.

Since 2022, She is playing the lead role of Anita Vibhuti Narayan Mishra in Popular Hindi Sitcom Bhabi Ji Ghar Par Hain opposite Aasif Sheikh for which she got praised by the audience over the years.

In 2026, She made her comeback in films from Bhabiji Ghar Par Hain! Fun On The Run based on her longest Indian television series Bhabi Ji Ghar Par Hain opposite Aasif Sheikh.

== Personal life ==
Vidisha married Sayak Paul in December 2016 in her hometown Varanasi. Paul works in a mining company in Ranchi and is from Kolkata. She gave birth to a daughter in July 2023.

== Filmography ==
=== Films ===
Year	Title	Role	Language	Notes
2007	Maa Iddari Madhya	Shivani	Telugu	
2007	Alaa		Telugu	
2007	Prem	Pavithaa	Telugu	
2007	Athili Sattibabu LKG	Ammulu	Telugu	
2007	Nali Naliyutha	Jennifer	Kannada	
2008	Kathavarayan	Malti	Tamil	
2011	Lucky Jokers	Lakshmi Thampuratty	Malayalam	
2012	Devaraya	Swapna	Telugu	
2016	Viraat	Spoorthi	Kannada	
2016	Janatha Garage	Riya Rana	Telugu	
2026	Bhabiji Ghar Par Hain! Fun On The Run	Anita Vibhuti Narayan Mishra	Hindi	

=== Television ===
Yeh Hai Mohabbatein 1500 Episode Celebration with Bhangra Dance

Year	Title	Role	Ref.
2004	Chaudah Phere		
2017–2018	Yeh Hai Mohabbatein	Roshni Bhalla	
2019–2020	Meri Gudiya	Ratrita "Ratri" Arora Gujral	
2020	Shrimad Bhagwat Mahapuran	Sita	
2020	Kahat Hanuman Jai Shri Ram	Devi Parvati	
2021	Durga – Mata Ki Chhaya	Devi Parvati	
2021–2022	Kashibai Bajirao Ballal	Shiu Krishna Joshi	
2022–present	Bhabiji Ghar Par Hain!	Anita Vibhuti Narayan Mishra	
