= Nali Naliyutha =

2007 Indian Kannada-language film

- Directed by: Jayanth
- Written by: Mohan Shankar
- Produced by: K Govindaraju
- Starring: Aniruddha Jatkar; Vidisha
- Cinematography: R Giri
- Edited by: T Shashikumar
- Music by: Rajesh Ramanath
- Release date: 31 August 2007
- Country: India
- Language: Kannada

Nali Naliyutha is a 2007 Indian Kannada-language film directed by Jayanth, starring Aniruddha Jatkar and Vidisha in lead roles.

== Cast ==
- Aniruddha Jatkar as Soorya
- Vidisha Srivastava as Jennifer
- Priyanka
- Anant Nag as Srinivasa
- Vinaya Prasad
- Roja as Mary
- Vanitha Vasu as Parvathi
- Ramesh Bhat
- Suja
- M. N. Lakshmi Devi

== Music ==
Nali Naliyutha

Soundtrack album by Rajesh Ramanath
- Released: 17 August 2007
- Recorded: 2007
- Genre: Feature film soundtrack
- Length: 23:18
- Language: Kannada

Official audio
- Nali Naliyutha- Full Album on YouTube

Track listing
| No. | Title | Singer(s) | Length |
|---|---|---|---|
| 1. | "Anandada Dumbhi" | K. S. Chithra | 4:32 |
| 2. | "Bhanina Chandranu" | Karthik, Nanditha | 4:14 |
| 3. | "E Gandu Yaro" | S. P. Balasubrahmanyam | 5:11 |
| 4. | "Laka Laka" | Santha Kumari | 4:05 |
| 5. | "Nille Hani" | Chaitra H. G., Devan | 5:56 |
| Total length: | | | 23:18 |

== Reception ==
=== Critical response ===
R G Vijayasarathy of Rediff.com scored the film at 2 out of 5 stars and says "Performance wise, Anirudhdh, though handicapped by a bad script, tries to be lively throughout the film. Anant Nag has once again done a good job. Vidisha, who has already worked in three Telugu films, is yet to learn what acting is all about though she looks glamorous. Tennis Krishna's comedy will entertain only front benchers. Roja acts in a brief role while Vinaya Prakash and Vanitha Vasu fit the bill". A critic from The Times of India scored the film at 2.5 out of 5 stars and wrote "It is a treat to watch Anirudh giving his best in emotional and romantic scenes. Vidisha is a perfect choice for the role. R Giri's camerawork is okay. Music by Rajesh Ramanath is average and Mohan impresses with catchy dialogues" A critic from Sify.com scored the film at 3 out of 5 stars and says "Anirudh has done his best in dancing, action and other departments [sic]. Vidisha as debutant has a good role to perform. Priyanka the local girl is also impressive. Ananthnag is as usual casual best. Roja, Vinayaprakash and Lakshmidevi have little to perform. Rajesh Ramanath copies the hit Hindi music tunes in one of the three good songs he has scored. Giri as cameraman is average. On a whole an enjoyable fare".
