= Vrudhanmare Sookshikkuka =

- Directed by: Sunil
- Written by: Sunil
- Produced by: M. Mani
- Starring: Jayaram; Dileep; Harisree Ashokan
- Edited by: P. C. Mohanan
- Music by: Berny-Ignatius
- Release date: 1995
- Running time: 117 minutes
- Country: India
- Language: Malayalam

Vrudhanmare Sookshikkuka (transl. Beware of Old men) is a 1995 Malayalam comedy thriller film directed by Sunil, starring Jayaram,Dileep, and Harisree Ashokan, with Khushbu, Jagathy Sreekumar, Mamukkoya, K. P. A. C. Lalitha and Ananya

== Plot ==
Friends and petty thieves, Sathyaraj and Dharmaraj, escape from police escort. They disguise themselves as old men, and go to Loveland, a resort in Ooty, managed by Hema. There is a hostage crisis at the resort. It is up to Hema's fiancé Vijay Krishnan to rescue the people.

== Cast ==
- Jayaram as SP Vijay Krishnan
- Dileep as Sathiyaraj/[K. T Nair]
- Harisree Ashokan in a Dual role as:
  - Dharmaraj
  - Daniel M D'Souza
- Khushbu Sundar as Hema
- Jagathy Sreekumar as Head Constable Rudran Pillai
- Karamana Janardanan Nair as Retired Judge Govindan Varma
- K. T. S. Padannayil as Phalgunan
- V. K. Sreeraman as Major Azeez
- Mammukoya as Home Minister
- Kuthiravattam Pappu as Sundaresan Nair
- M. S. Thripunithura as Warrier
- Prathapachandran as Police Officer
- N. L. Balakrishnan as Retired IG Santhasundaran Pillai
- Krishnankutty Nair as Bheemasena Kuruppu
- K.P.A.C. Lalitha as Bhageerathi Thampuratti
- Philomina as Margaret
- Adoor Bhavani as Pankajavalli
- Adoor Pankajam as Kusumavalli
- Poojappura Ravi as Swamy
- Jose Pellissery as Novelist Kanjikuzhi Chacko
- Paravoor Bharathan as Pachu
- T. P. Madhavan as Thirumala Thommichan
- Kozhikode Narayanan Nair as Retired Principal Jose Arani
- Kunjandi as Abdul Rahman
- Ananya as child artist
- Kaduvakkulam Antony as Kandamkulam Kesavan
- Thodupuzha Vasanthi as Mrs. Sundaresan Nair
- Lalithasree as Mrs. Kuruppu
- Trichur Elsi
- Kumarakom Raghunath as Mohan
- Anila Sreekumar
- Charulatha aka Kukku Singh
- Aroma Sunilkumar as Balu
