= Kottaram Veettile Apputtan =

- Directed by: Rajasenan
- Screenplay by: Mani Shornur; Rajan Kizhekkanela (dialogues)
- Story by: Mani Shornur; C. V. Balakrishnan (idea)
- Produced by: Kalligoor Sasi; P. M. Basheer
- Starring: Jayaram; Shruti; Kalabhavan Mani; Jagathy Sreekumar
- Cinematography: K. P. Nambiathiri
- Edited by: G. Murali
- Music by: Berny-Ignatius
- Production company: United Vision
- Distributed by: Seven Star
- Release date: 30 November 1998
- Running time: 162 minutes
- Country: India
- Language: Malayalam

Kottaram Veettile Apputtan is a 1998 Indian Malayalam-language romantic comedy-drama film directed by Rajasenan, starring Jayaram, Shruti, Kalabhavan Mani and Jagathy Sreekumar in the lead Roles. The film was dubbed into Tamil as Aranmanaikaran and later remade in Telugu as Manasunna Maaraju and in Tamil as Sound Party.

== Plot ==
The film tells the story of Apputtan, a rich, generous and liberal man. He helps settle the financial woes of people in the village. He is attracted to a girl whose education he has been sponsoring. Whilst away she writes him letters in gratitude of the education he is providing her however he misinterprets her gratitude for love. He decides to not tell her of his love, believing that she reciprocates his feelings. Over the 5-year period of her education, he buys her weddings gifts in hope that he can give it to her one day. Once she graduates and returns as a doctor he builds her a medical clinic so she can work in their town. Further misunderstandings and confusion occurs. Apputan's enemy and the girl's father, an alcoholic team up by arranging her marriage with the enemy's son. Eventually, the film ends well with the girl finally coming to know about his love and developing an interest towards Apputtan.

== Cast ==
- Jayaram as Appukuttan (Appoottan)
- Shruti as Dr. Ambili
- Kalabhavan Mani as Maniyan
- Jagathy Sreekumar as Madhavan
- Mamukoya as Kunjahammedkutty
- Bobby Kottarakkara as Vakkachan
- Indrans as Ramankutty
- Rajan P. Dev as Kozhikkaden Achuthan Nambiar
- Narendra Prasad as Ravunni
- Nandu as Shaji, News reporter
- Kaviyoor Ponnamma as Appoottan's mother
- Roslin as Saraswati Ambili's Mother
- Devi S. as Chinnu (Amblili's sister)
- James as Nambiar's helper
- Kannur Sreelatha as Sarojini
- Darshana as Chandrika
- T. P. Madhavan as M L A Sudarshan
- Kuttyedathi Vilasini as Kunjulakshmi Amma
- Anitha Nair as Daughter of Kunjulekshmi Amma
- Thalapathi Dinesh as Pandi
- Chandni Shaju as Omanakutty (Cameo)

== Soundtrack ==
The film's soundtrack contains 6 songs, all composed by Berny-Ignatius. Lyrics were by S. Ramesan Nair, Pandalam Sudhakaran and Chittoor Gopi.

#	Title	Singer(s)	Raga(s)
1	"Aavanipponnoonjal Aadikkam"	M. G. Sreekumar	Abheri
2	"Aavanipponnoonjaal Aadumpol"	K. S. Chithra	Abheri
3	"Ambottee"	M. G. Sreekumar, Kalabhavan Mani, Jagathy Sreekumar	Sindhu Bhairavi
4	"Ente Mounaraagaminnu"	K. J. Yesudas, K. S. Chithra	Dharmavati
5	"Karalinte Novarinjal"	K. J. Yesudas	
6	"Naalukettin Akathalathil"	M. G. Sreekumar	
