= Gandhari (1993 film) =

1993 Indian film

- Directed by: Sunil
- Written by: Sab John
- Starring: Madhavi; Babu Antony
- Release date: 12 September 1993
- Country: India
- Language: Malayalam

Gandhari is a 1993 Indian Malayalam-language action thriller film directed by Sunil, and written by Sab John. The film stars Madhavi, Babu Antony, Zainuddin, Siddique, Rajan P. Dev, Sai Kumar, M. G. Soman and Jose Pellissery.

== Plot ==
In Kerala, Commissioner Sathyanath and Ittichen arrests Malini, a pharmacist, under false charges and tortures her for her newly created cocaine-type drug formula, which was reported earlier to Sathyanath and Ittichen by Malini's professor Ramamoorthy, but Malini does not reveal about the formula. Due to this, Ittichen and Sathyanath kills Malini's husband Laxman and make it as a case of suicide. Malini is released from prison and heads to Mumbai under a different name Aparna, where she works with the crime syndicate and hires Vishnu and his friends to kill Sathyanath and Ittichen. Malini/Aparna returns to Kerala and learns that her daughter is in an orphanage. Vishnu and his friends kills Ramamoorthy. Sathyanath catches Vishnu's friend Zainuddin and beats him to death. An enraged Vishnu and his friends kills Sathyanath and Ittichen. Malini/Aparna arrives and finally meets his daughter before being arrested by CI Jayaram.

== Cast ==
- Madhavi as Aparna / Malini Laxman
- Babu Antony as Vishnu
- Siddique as CI Jayaram
- Zainuddin as Zainuddin
- Kalabhavan Anzar as Hari
- Rajan P Dev as Ittichen
- Sai Kumar as Laxman
- Charuhasan as Prof. Ramamoorthy
- M. G. Soman as Commissioner Sathyanath IPS
- Jose Pellissery as Shiva Prasad
- Jagathy Sreekumar as Scud Kuttappan
- Riza Bava as Minister
- Abu Salim as Charlie
