= Jomon (director) =

Indian film director

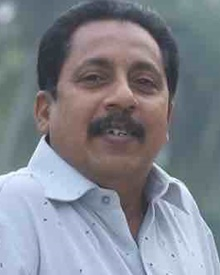
- Born: Jomon Theckan kozhikode
- Occupations: Director, screenwriter
- Years active: 1984– till date
- Spouse: Lecturer
- Children: 2

Jomon is an Indian screenwriter and director. He is active in Malayalam cinema from 1990 to date. His directorial debut film was Samrajyam and it was a hit in the Malayalam film industry. This film was dubbed and released in the same name in Andhra Pradesh, Tamil Nadu and did well in the box office. After working as assistant director in films like Aalkkoottathil Thaniye, Uyarangalil, Adiyozhukkukal, 1921 and Douthyam, Jomon became an independent Malayalam cinema director with the 1990 Mammootty film Samrajyam which was one of the highest grossing Malayalam films at the time. It ran for more than 200 days in theaters in Kerala and more than 400 days in Andhra Pradesh, a record that still remains unbeaten. His other commercially successful film was Jackpot starring Mammootty in the lead role.

== Filmography ==
Year	Film	Language	Starring
1990	Samrajyam	Malayalam	Mammootty, Madhu, Srividya
1991	Anaswaram	Malayalam	Mammootty, Shweta Menon, Innocent
1992	Asadhyulu	Telugu	Jagapathi Babu
1993	Jackpot	Malayalam	Mammootty, Gautami, Aishwarya
1993	Yaadhavam	Malayalam	Suresh Gopi, Narendra Prasad, Khushbu
1995	Karma	Malayalam	Suresh Gopi, Ranjitha
1998	Sidhartha	Malayalam	Mammootty, Rambha, Srividya
2001	Unnathangalil	Malayalam	Mohanlal, Manoj K. Jayan, Lal, Indraja
2006	Bhargavacharitham Moonam Khandam	Malayalam	Mammootty, Sreenivasan, Rahman, Sai Kumar
