= Yaadhavam =

- Directed by: Jomon
- Written by: Ranjith
- Produced by: Geethanjalai Nandakumar
- Starring: Suresh Gopi; Narendra Prasad; Madhu; Khushbu
- Cinematography: S. Kumar
- Edited by: K. Narayanan
- Music by: Raghu Kumar (songs); S. P. Venkitesh (score)
- Production company: Nandhana
- Distributed by: Surya Cine Arts; Sudev Release
- Release date: 1993
- Country: India
- Language: Malayalam

Yaadhavam is a 1993 Indian Malayalam-language action film directed by Jomon and written by Ranjith, starring Suresh Gopi, Madhu, Narendra Prasad, and Khushbu. The film was an average grosser at the box office.

== Plot ==
Chandrasenan alias Senan and his younger brother Vishnu run a parallel government in Kozhikode. Anjana is a lady reporter from Mumbai, who arrives to find her father Vishwanatha Menon, the Central Industries Minister. Vishwanatha Menon is an innocent soul, but his adopted son Devan had been involved in many illegal activities. Devan approaches Senan for helping him to finish Anjana, which leads to a heated argument between Vishnu and Senan. Vishnu falls deeply in love with Anjana after knowing about her story. Mohan Thambi is an illegal business magnate who is planning to contest against Vishwanatha Menon in the coming by-election. Devan and Mohan Thambi bribe Senan's right-hand man Chekkootty, who later stabs Senan by ambushing him from behind, thus killing him. Enraged, Vishnu learns that Mohan Thambi and Devan are planning to kill Vishwanatha Menon, where he succeeds in defeating them and saves Vishwanathan Menon.

== Cast ==
- Suresh Gopi as Vishnu
- Narendra Prasad as Senan (Chandrasenan)
- Madhu as Vishwanatha Menon, Central Industries Minister
- Khushbu as Anjana
- Ganesh Kumar as Devan, Menon's adopted son
- Devan as Mohan Thampi
- Maniyanpilla Raju as Palappuram
- Kunjandi as Ramettan, Labour party leader
- KR Vijaya as Prabhadevi
- Bahadoor as Madhavettan
- Rekha as Jayanthi
- Sathaar as Chekkutty
- Janardhanan as Commissioner Saankaranarayanan
- Subair as CI Jayapal
- Thalapathy Dinesh as SI Nagesh
- Abu Salim
- C. I. Paul as Chief Minister
- Biyon as Senan's childhood
- Beena Antony as SI Nagesh's wife
- Sandhya as Cicily, Palappuram's wife
- Divya as Manisha
- Pavithran as Balan Vallikkavu, youth leader
- Vijayan Peringode as Mayan
