= Jackpot (1993 film) =

- Poster
- Directed by: Jomon
- Screenplay by: T. Damodaran
- Story by: Shajoon Kariyal
- Produced by: Vijaya
- Starring: Mammootty; Tejas Kapadia; R. N. Sudarshan; Gautami; Aishwarya
- Cinematography: Ananda Kuttan
- Music by: Ilaiyaraaja; Lyrics: Bichu Thirumala
- Distributed by: Vijaya
- Release date: 20 May 1993
- Country: India
- Language: Malayalam

Jackpot is a 1993 Malayalam-language film, directed by Jomon.It stars Mammootty, Tejas Kapadia, Gautami and Aishwarya, with Kannada actor R. N. Sudarshan playing the antagonist. It portrays the story of a race jockey.

== Summary ==
Gowtham Krishna and Sindhu get married opposing her rich parents' disapproval. Sindhu dies after giving birth to their son Rahul. The rich parents of Sindhu take custody of the child and Gowtham is left with the only option of winning a horse race to get back the custody of his child.

== Cast ==
- Mammootty as Gowtham Krishna
- Tejas Kapadia as Rahul, Gowtham's son
- R. N. Sudarshan as Venkatesh
- Gavin Packard as Jerry Shroff
- Gautami as Amritha
- Aishwarya as Sindhu
- Jagadish as David
- Jagannadha Varma as DSP
- Sainudeen
- Rajan P. Dev as Gounder
- Prathapachandran as Ruby Devaraj
- Vijayakumar
- Bahadoor as Moiduikka
- Devan as Jayan
- Kollam Ajith
- M. G. Soman as Sundaram
- Mala Aravindan as Doctor
- Manjula Vijayakumar as Rakhee Varma
- Poornam Viswanathan
- T. P. Madhavan
- Nishal Chandra
- P. K. Abraham as School Principal

== Soundtrack ==
Jackpot

Soundtrack album by Ilaiyaraaja
- Released: 1993
- Genre: Feature film soundtrack
- Language: Malayalam

The soundtrack was composed by Ilaiyaraaja, with lyrics written by Bichu Thirumala.

Track list
No.	Title	Lyrics	Singer(s)	Length
1.	"Hey Kulambadi Thaalam"	Bichu Thirumala	K. S. Chithra & Chorus
2.	"Mungi Mungi Muthupongi"	Bichu Thirumala	K. S. Chithra, Krishnachandran
3.	"Thaazhvaaram Manpoove"	Bichu Thirumala	K. J. Yesudas, K. S. Chithra
4.	"Thaazhvaaram Manpoove (M)"	Bichu Thirumala	K. J. Yesudas
5.	"Valathum Idathum"	Bichu Thirumala	Unni Menon
