= Sunil (director) =

Indian film director in Malayalam movies

Sunil Karanthur
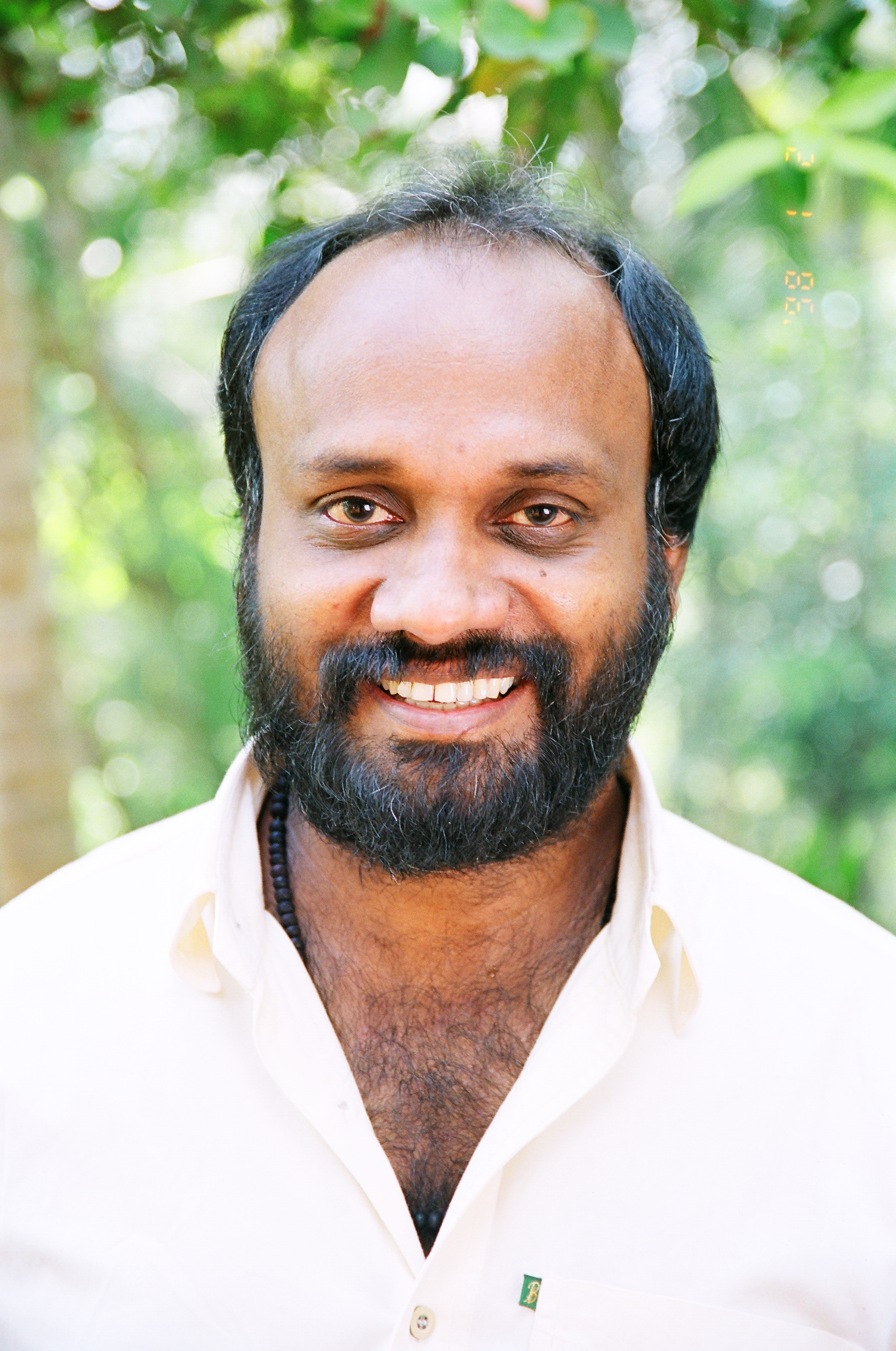
- Born: Kozhikode
- Occupation: Director
- Years active: 1992 – present

Sunil is an Indian film director in Malayalam movies. He has directed more than 15 Malayalam movies. His most popular movies are Maanathe Kottaram, Priyappetta Kukku, Vridhanmaare Sookshikkuka, and Alancherry Thambrakkal.

Sunil attended a film institute in Trivandrum in the early 1980s, where Adam Ayub was one of his professors.

== Filmography ==
=== Direction ===
Film	Year
Priyapetta Kukku	1992
Gandhari	1993
Manathe Kottaram	1994
Bharanakoodam	1994
Alancheri Thamprakkal	1995
Chantha	1995
Vrudhanmare Sookshikkuka	1995
Poonilamazha	1997
Red Indians	1999
Korappan The Great	2001
Grand Mother	2002
Sahodaran Sahadevan	2003
Katha Parayum Theruvoram	2009
Thathwamasi	2010
Lucky Jokers	2011
Arakkirukkan	2018
Cake Story	2025

=== Screenplay ===
- Vanarasena (1996)
- Red Indians (1999)

=== Story ===
- Priyappetta Kukku (1992)
- Gaandhaari (1993)
- Vanarasena (1996)
- Red Indians (1999)
- Lucky Jokers (2011)

=== Dialogue ===
- Vanarasena (1996)
- Red Indians (1999)
