= Injakkadan Mathai & Sons =

- Poster
- Directed by: Anil Babu
- Written by: Kaloor Dennis
- Produced by: Jubilant Productions
- Starring: Innocent; Suresh Gopi; Jagadish; Urvashi; K.P.A.C. Lalitha; Kalpana; Sai Kumar; Rajan P. Dev
- Cinematography: Ravi K. Chandran
- Edited by: P.C. Mohanan
- Music by: S. P. Venkatesh; Lyrics: Bichu Thirumala
- Distributed by: Jubilant Release
- Release date: 1993
- Running time: 130 minutes
- Country: India
- Language: Malayalam

Injakkadan Mathai & Sons is a 1993 Malayalam film written by Kaloor Dennis and directed by Anil Babu, starring Innocent, Suresh Gopi, Jagadish, and Urvashi.

== Plot ==
Injakkadan Mathai owns a textile shop called Injakkadan Mathai and Sons with his two sons Thankachan and Roy. Their main rival, the Chungathara clan, also owns a textile shop. Thankachan marries Beena, who is the daughter of Mathai's late friend, Thomachen. Roy falls in love with Sherly, Beena's sister. However, they learn that Chungathara Chackochen had killed Thomachen. Inchakkadan Mathai is kidnapped by Chackochen and gets saved by his two sons.

== Cast ==
- Innocent as Injakkadan Mathai (Thankachan and Roy's father)
- Suresh Gopi as Thankachan (Mathai's oldest son)
- Jagadish as Roy (Mathai's second son)
- Saranya Ponvannan as Beena (Thankachan's wife)
- Urvashi as Sherly (Roy's love interest)
- K.P.A.C. Lalitha as Alikutty (Roy and Thankachan's mother)
- Kalpana as Annakutty (Mathai's maid)
- Rajan P. Dev as David
- Sai Kumar
- Bindu Panicker
- Jose Pellissery as Kuriachan
- Adoor Bhavani as Thandamma
- Sathaar
- PC George as Vakkachan
- Kundara Johny
- Sukumari
- Bobby Kottarakkara
- Aboobacker as Brockar Mathachan
- Rani Larius

== Soundtrack ==
The film's soundtrack contains three songs composed by S. P. Venkatesh and the lyrics written by Bichu Thirumala.

#	Title	Singer(s)
1	"Madhuram Chorum"	K. J. Yesudas
2	"Paathiraakottaarangalil"	K. S. Chitra
3	"Tabala Thimilamelam"	K. J. Yesudas
