= Robin Thirumala =

Indian film director (born 1964)

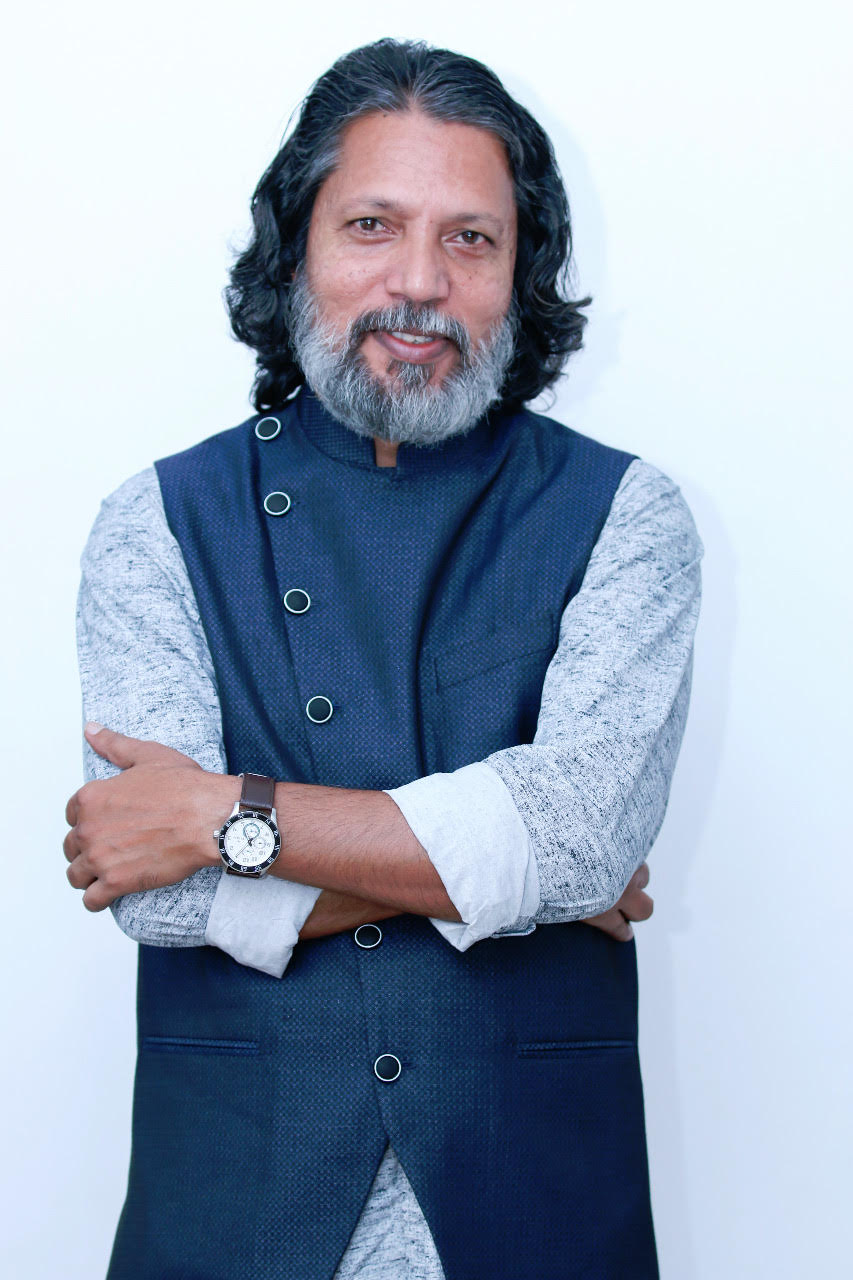
- Born: Thirumalayil Robinson; 30 May 1964 (age 62); Kodencheri, Kozhikode, Kerala, India
- Occupations: Film director; Screenwriter; Music Composer; Entrepreneur; Motivational Speaker
- Years active: 1985–present
- Spouse: Shyni Robin (m. 1989)
- Children: Charles Robin (b.1990); Prince Robin (b. 1996)
- Parents: Aype Thirumalayil; Leelaamma Aype
- Website: robinthirumala.com

Thirumalayil Robinson better known as Robin Thirumala (born on 30 May 1964) is an Indian film director, screenwriter, music composer, lyricist, actor, Motivational speaker, and founder of the 4 am Club Foundation.

== Early life and career ==
Robin Thirumala was born in Kodencheri, a village in Kozhikode district, Kerala, India, to farmers Iype Thirumalayil and Leelamma Iype. He completed his schooling at St. Joseph's School, Kodanchery, and attended Government College, Kodanchery.

Thirumala began his career as an independent journalist in 1985. In 1989, he entered the Malayalam film industry as an assistant director under the filmmaker duo Siddique-Lal during the production of Ramji Rao Speaking (1989).

He made his debut as a screenwriter with the 1992 Malayalam film Makkal Mahatmyam, directed by Paulson and based on a story by Siddique-Lal. During the early part of his career, he worked primarily on comedy films before moving into political dramas and action thrillers. His screenwriting credits include Chantha (1995), Indraprastham (1996), and Kannur (1997).

Over the course of his career, Thirumala expanded his work beyond screenwriting to include film direction, music composition, lyric writing, and acting in Malayalam cinema.

== Career ==
Thirumala started his career as a journalist in 1985. He entered the world of cinema by assisting noted director duo Siddique-Lal. Later, he made many hit films in Malayalam film industry by working as an independent director, screenwriter, music composer and lyricist.

He gave his first Script to Siddiqoe Lal in 1992, for the film Makkal Mahatmyam. His early work focused on writing comedy films, but he later also wrote political action thrillers. Indraprastham was one example of this.

Thirumala composed a song in collaboration with Raveendran Master in 2004 for the film Maratha Nadu, directed by K. K. Haridas. Thirumala also received acclaim for the lyrics for a song from the film 'Adharam'. After a gap of four years he composed nine songs for his directorial debut 'Chembada'. Several songs from the movie were critically and commercially acclaimed. He named himself as 'Musafir' for the film and performed one song written by himself. After three years he wrote the music for the film 'Veendum kannur'.

== Filmography ==
Year	Title	Role
1989	Ramji Rao Speaking	Assistant director
1992	Makkal Mahatmyam	Screenplay
1994	Manathe Kottaram	Screenplay
1995	Alancheri Thamprakkal	Screenplay
1995	Chantha	Screenplay
1996	Indraprastham	Screenplay
1997	Kannur	Screenplay
1999	Gaandhiyan	Screenplay
2001	Unnathangalil	Screenplay
2001	Saivar Thirumeni	Screenplay
2004	Maratha Nadu	Music director, Lyricist
2005	Krithyam	Story
2006	Pathaaka	Screenplay
2008	Chempada	Director, Screenplay, Music
2011	Race	Screenplay
2012	Veendum Kannur	Screenplay, Music, Lyrics
2024	Anizham Thirunaal Maarthanda Varma	Screenplay

As actor

- Hidimba (2023; Telugu)

== Corporate branding and advertising ==
Alongside his film career, Thirumala has worked in advertising and corporate communications. He has written advertising copy, slogans, and commercial jingles for various brands and business groups.

Among the brands for which he has worked are:

- ChicKing
- Kaula Masala
- Swadeshi
- Mermer Italia
- Chemmanur Jewellers
- Kairali Airlines

== Public speaking and social initiatives ==
In addition to his work in cinema, Thirumala has been involved in public speaking and social initiatives. In 2020, he founded 4 AM Club Global, a community-based initiative that promotes early rising, structured morning routines, and personal development activities.

The initiative was launched in Kochi, Kerala, during the COVID-19 pandemic and conducts programmes focused on yoga, meditation, physical exercise, reading, self-learning, and productivity practices.The organization also hosts motivational sessions and interactive discussions featuring speakers from fields including spirituality, literature, psychology, and personal development.

Robin serves as the founder and principal mentor of the initiative. According to organizational reports, the movement has attracted participants from different parts of India and from several countries abroad.

Associated activities of the initiative include yoga training programmes conducted through the Bharatheeya Yoga Center and cultural programmes organized through its music club.

== 360° Communication Mastery Program ==
Thirumala developed the 360° Communication Mastery Program, a communication training initiative that covers areas such as public speaking, leadership communication, emotional intelligence, negotiation, conflict resolution, and digital communication. The programme is delivered through a year-long curriculum consisting of lessons, exercises, assessments, workshops, and related learning activities.
