= Sakshal Sreeman Chathunni =

- Directed by: Anil–Babu
- Written by: Kaloor Dennis
- Produced by: Koshi; Palamuttam Majeed
- Starring: Innocent; Jagadish; Baiju Santhosh; Maathu; Jagathy Sreekumar
- Cinematography: Sanjeev Sankar
- Edited by: P. C. Mohanan
- Music by: Rajamani
- Production company: Universal Cinema
- Distributed by: United Movie Enterprises
- Release date: 1993
- Country: India
- Language: Malayalam

Sakshal Sreeman Chathunni (transl. The Real Mister Chathunni) is a 1993 Indian Malayalam-language comedy fantasy drama film directed by Anil–Babu and written by Kaloor Dennis, starring Innocent, Jagadish and Baiju Santhosh.

== Plot ==
The plot follows two friends Unnikrishnan and Dasan accidentally meeting a genie named Chathunni and the adventures involving the trio and the problems occurring around them.

== Cast ==
- Innocent as Chathunni / Chathunni Mash
- Jagadish as Unnikrishnan / Unni
- Baiju Santhosh as Dasan, Unni's Friend
- Maathu as Maya Rajagopal, Unni's Love Interest
- Jagathy Sreekumar as Pathalam Bhairavan, Unni and Dasan's Friend
- K. P. A. C. Lalitha as Pankajam, Unni's Aunt
- Sukumari as Bhavani, Unni's Mother
- Shammi Thilakan as Vikraman, Maya's Ex-Fiancé
- K. P. A. C. Sunny as Rajagopal, Maya's Father
- P. C. George as Keshava Panicker, Vikraman's Father
- Krishnankutty Nair as Karikkassery Sankunni Nair, Unni's Father
- Kundara Johny as Bhargavan, Pankajam's Younger Brother
- Zainuddin as Gopalan, Pankajam's Youngest Brother
- M. S. Thripunithura as Parameswaran Nair
- Kalpana as Reshmi Nair
- Harisree Ashokan as Bhaskaran
- Paravoor Bharathan as House Owner
- T. P. Madhavan as Blade Kaimal
- Kunchan as Ravuji
- N. Govindankutty as Aazhvancheri Illathu Theekran Namboothiri
- Narayanankutty as Thief
- Bobby Kottarakkara as Police Constable
- Rashid as Gabbar Singh
- Kavitha Thambi as Sreedevi, Unni's Sister
- Silk Smitha as Herself (Special appearance in song)
- Shilpa Punnoose

== Soundtrack ==
The songs were penned by Bichu Thirumala and the music was composed by Rajamani.

No.	Title	Lyrics	Music	Singer(s)	Length
1.	"Jimba Jimba"	Bichu Thirumala	Rajamani	Minmini, C.O. Anto & Chorus
2.	"Paattu Paadava"	Bichu Thirumala	Rajamani	Malgudi Subha & Chorus

== Reception ==
A critic from The Times of India wrote that "The adventures of Unnikrishnan and Dasan along with their friend extraordinaire - Chathunni is amusing".
