= Siddique filmography =

Siddique Mamathu (born 1 October 1962), known as "Siddique", is an Indian actor and producer, who works mainly in Malayalam cinema. Along with appearing in over 350 Malayalam films, he has also acted in Tamil, Telugu and Hindi language films.

== As actor ==
=== Malayalam ===
==== 1980s ====
Year	Title	Role	Notes
1985	Aa Neram Alppa Dooram	Alex	First movie
1985	Aarodum Parayaruthu		
1987	Vazhiyorakazchakal		
1987	New Delhi	Siddik	
1987	Bhoomiyile Rajakkanmar	Siddik	
1988	Dhinarathrangal		
1988	Witness	Alexander	
1988	Janmandharam	Abdu	
1988	David David Mr. David		
1988	Varum Varathikkilla		
1989	Nagarangalil Chennu Raparkam		
1989	Peruvannapurathe Visheshangal	Antappan	
1989	Nidrayil Oru Rathri	Priest	
1989	Rathibhavam		
1989	Pradeshika Varthakal		
1989	Kaalalppada	Vichu	
1989	Carnivel	Siddhu	
1989	Aaram Wardil Abyandrakalaham		
1989	Thadavarayile Rajakkanmar	SI Ravishankar	
1989	Nair saab	Cadet Siddique	
1989	Antharjanam		
1989	New Year		

==== 1990s ====
Year	Title	Role	Notes
1990	In Harihar Nagar	Govindan Kutty	
1990	Pavam Pavam Rajakumaran	Aravindhan Mash	
1990	Nanma Nirajavan sreenivasan		
1990	Gajakesariyogam	Ram Mohan IAS	
1990	Kouthuka varthkal	Pavithran	
1990	Varthmanakalam		
1990	No. 20 Madras Mail	Tony's Friend	
1990	Purapaad		
1990	Sunday 7 PM	Geevarghese	
1991	Mookkilla Rajyathu	Venu	
1991	Sandesham	Udayabhanu	
1991	Chanjattam	V.K Madhusoodhanan Nair	
1991	Nattu Vishesham	Aniyankunju	
1991	Ezhunallathu	Subramaniyam Iyyer	
1991	P.O.Box-27		
1991	Mimics Parade	Sabu	
1991	Godfather	Veerabhadran	
1991	Mukhachitram	Kannan	
1991	Sundhari Kakka	Nixon	
1991	Georgootty C/O Georgootty	SI Feroz	
1991	Ganamela	Tony Fernandez	
1991	Irikku M.D Akkathundu	Sunny	
1991	Innathe Programme	Rajendran	
1991	Onnaam Muhurtham	Kumaran	
1992	Daivathinte Vikrithikal		
1992	Ayalathe Adheham	Rajeevan	
1992	Cheppadividya	Sub Inspector	
1992	Apaaratha	Suresh	
1992	Mantrikacheppu	Williams	
1992	Soorya Manasam	Urumees's father	
1992	Pandu Pandaru Rajakumari	Johnson	
1992	Poochakaru Manikkettum	Hareendran	
1992	Priyapetta Kukku	Reji	
1992	Congratulations Miss Anitha menon	Sudheer	
1992	Kasarkode Khaderbai	Sabu	
1992	Thiruthalvaadi	Vishnu	
1992	Oru Kochu Bhoomikulukkam	Ravi	
1992	Ezharaponnanna	Dasan	
1992	Kunukkitta Kozhi	Viswanathan	
1992	Mughamudra	Bharathan	
1992	Ente Ponnu thampuran	Pattar	
1992	Nagarathil Samsaravishayam	Samson	
1992	Kallan Kappalil Thanne	Murali	
1992	Mr & Mrs		
1992	Welcome to Kodaikanal	Vinayachandran	
1992	Ooty Pattanam	Jimmy	
1993	Gandhari	CI Jayaram	
1993	Kavadiyattam	Kuruppu	
1993	Vatsalyam	Vijayakumaran Nair	
1993	Janam	Sivan	
1993	Arthana	Suresh	
1993	Tharavadu	Kabeer Das	
1993	Uppukandam Brothers	SP Roy Mathews	
1993	Ekalavyan	CI Sharath Chandran	
1993	Kalipattam	Kutty	
1993	Sthalathe Pradhana Payyans	Commissioner Mohammad Iqbal IPS	
1993	Nandini Oppol	Ajayan	
1993	Porutham	Chandrabhanu	
1993	Pravachakan	Prakashan	
1993	Adheham Enna Edheham		
1993	Journalist	Viswanathan	
1993	Aganeyam		
1993	Koushalam	SI Gopinathan	
1994	Bhismacharya	CI Sudheer	
1994	Gandeevam	Commando Vijayan	
1994	Kinnaripuzhayoram	Dr. UnniKrishnan	
1994	Malappuram Haji Mahanaya Joji	Kunjalikutty	
1994	Pavam I.A. Ivachan	Adv. Susheelan Nair	
1994	Pradakshinam	Vasu	
1994	Varanamalyam	Adv. Bharathan	
1994	Simhavalan Menon	Insp. Jalram	
1995	Kaattile Thadi Thevarude Aana	Devan	
1995	Hijack	Dy.SP Balachandran	
1995	Sargavasantham	Roy	
1996	Lalanam	Vijayakumar	
1997	Asuravamsam	Dosth viswanathan	
1997	Lelam	Hussain	
1997	Superman	City Police Commissioner Rajagopal IPS	
1997	Krishnagudiyil Oru Pranayakalathu	Renji	
1998	Kanmadam	Damodaran	
1998	Sneham	Sivankutty	
1998	Mayilpeelikkavu	Psychiatrist	
1998	Kalaapam	CI	
1998	Ayal Kadha Ezhuthukayanu	Adv. K. G. Nambiar	
1999	Crime File	SP Anwar Rawther IPS	
1999	Vazhunnor	Thevakattu Paulachen	
1999	Kannezhuthi Pottum Thottu	Chandrappan	
1999	Chandamama	CI Mathew Vasiparamban	
1999	Veendum Chila Veetu Karyangal	Paul	
1999	Ustad	Irani	
1999	Janani		

==== 2000s ====
Year	Title	Role	Notes
2000	Satyameva Jayathe	Balasubramaniam alias Balu Bhai	
2000	Cover Story		
2000	Dany	Freddy	
2000	Valliettan	Arakkal Raghu	
2000	Kochu Kochu Santhoshangal	Ramesh	
2000	Ayyappantamma Neyyappam Chuttu		
2000	Arayannangalude Veedu	Suresh Nair	
2000	Mimics 2000		
2001	Kannaki	Choman	
2001	Meghamalhar		
2001	Bharthavudyogam	Reji Menon	
2001	Nariman	Adv. Padmanabhan Thampi	
2001	Raavanaprabhu	SP Sreenivasan IPS	
2001	Uthaman	SI Jayaraj	
2001	Naranathu Thampuran	Dr.Rajeev	
2001	Aram Indriyam		
2002	Kai Ethum Doorathu	Babunath	
2002	Puthooramputhri Unniyarcha	Aromal Chekavar	
2002	Kalachakram	Rajeev George	
2002	Stop Violence		
2002	Onnaman		
2002	Bhavam	Matthew	
2002	Yathrakarude Sradhakku	Dr. Pradeep	
2002	Kalyanaraman	Doctor	Cameo Appearance
2002	Nandanam	Balan	Also Producer
2003	Kaliyodam		
2003	Ente Veedu Appuvinteyum	CI	
2003	Sadanandante Samayam	Sudakaran	
2003	Mizhi Randilum	Dr.Menon	
2003	Ivar	SP Jacob Mathew IPS	
2003	Hariharan Pilla Happy Aanu		
2003	War & Love	Capt. Kabeer	
2003	Choonda	Varghese Panjikaran	
2003	Malsaram		
2003	Manassinakkare	Tony Kombanakkadan	
2004	Sasneham Sumithra	CI	
2004	Sethurama Iyer CBI	Balagopal	
2004	Kanninum Kannadikkum	Harikrishnan	
2004	Udayam	DySP Vishwanathan	
2004	Vellinakshatram	Manavenda Varma / Mahendra Varma	
2004	Chathikkatha Chanthu	Vasumathi's Uncle	
2004	Greetings	Rangaswami Iyengar	
2004	Natturajavu	Pathiriveettil Johnykutty	
2004	Thudakkam	Sulaiman	
2004	Agninakshathram	Chudalan/Maannappan	
2004	Koottu		
2005	Ben Johnson	S.P	
2005	Hridayathil Sookshikkan		
2005	Manikyan	Gopikrishnan	
2005	Krithyam	ACP Surya Narayanan IPS	
2005	Thaskaraveeran	Thommi	
2005	Udayon	Mammali	
2005	Naran	Gopinathan Nambiar	
2005	The Tiger	John Varghese	
2006	Rasathanthram	Ramachandran	
2006	Pachakuthira	Akash's foster father	
2006	Balram vs. Tharadas	DYSP George	
2006	Thanthra	Suryadharman	
2006	Prajapathi	Kaliyarmadom Giri	
2006	Mughamariyathe		
2006	Bada Dosth	Geevarghese	Also producer
2006	Baba Kalyani	DIG Raghupathi IPS	
2006	Smart City	Commissioner Arun Nambiar IPS	
2007	Anchil Oral Arjunan	Vijayan	
2007	Chotta Mumbai	'Mullan' Chandrappan	
2007	Time	Commissioner Alexander Mekkadan IPS	
2007	Nadiya Kollappetta Rathri	Usthad Ghulam Musafir	
2007	July 4	SP Ramachandran IPS	
2007	Hallo	Mahesh Bhai	
2007	Ali Bhai	Sundaran Thampi	
2007	Paradesi	Hamsa	
2007	Rock n' Roll	Gunasekharan	
2007	Flash	Chandi	
2008	College Kumaran	Minister Sethunathan	
2008	Innathe Chinthavishayam		
2008	Annan Thambi	Govindan	
2008	Shakespeare M.A. Malayalam		
2008	Madampi	Sreedharan	
2008	Gulmohar	Harikrishnan	
2008	Oru Pennum Randaanum		
2008	Kurukshetra	Subedar Maj. Fussy Ahmed	
2008	Twenty:20	Madhava Menon	
2009	Red Chillies	Commissioner Vyasan IPS	
2009	Nammal Thammil	Anu's Father	
2009	2 Harihar Nagar	Govindan Kutty	Sequel of In Harihar Nagar
2009	I. G. - Inspector General	Saheer Ahmad IPS	
2009	Black Dalia		
2009	Ivar Vivahitharayal	Adv. Ananthan Menon	
2009	Chemistry	Velayudhan	
2009	Seetha Kalyanam	Harikrishnan	
2009	Kerala Cafe	Ravi	Segment Aviramam, co-starring Shweta Menon
2009	Meghatheertham		
2009	Paleri Manikyam: Oru Pathirakolapathakathinte Katha	Balan Nair	
2009	Chattambinadu	Kattappilly Nagendran	

==== 2010s ====
Year	Title	Role	Notes
2010	Yugapurushan	Dr.Padmanabhan Palpu	
2010	Nayakan	Shankar Das alias J.S. / Ram Das	
2010	In Ghost House Inn	Govindan Kutty	Sequel of In Harihar Nagar and 2 Harihar Nagar
2010	Pramani	Somasekara Panicker	
2010	April Fool	Music Director Rajesh	
2010	Pokkiri Raja	Commissioner Rajendra Babu IPS	
2010	Alexander the Great	Rama Varma	
2010	Nallavan	SI Kumaresan	
2010	Kutty Srank	Jonas Achan	
2010	Kadaksham		
2010	Pranchiyettan & the Saint	Dr. Jose	
2010	Kaaryasthan	Rajan	
2010	Four Friends	Dr. Siddharth	
2010	The Thriller	ADGP Balagopal IPS	
2010	Again Kasargod Khader Bhai	Sabu	Cameo appearance
2010	Tournament	coach	Cameo appearance
2011	Makeup Man	Sidharth (Film Director)	
2011	Nadakame Ulakam	Producer Ram Mohan	
2011	August 15	Abraham	
2011	Seniors	Unnithan (College Lecturer)	
2011	Naayika	Film producer Stephen Muthalali	
2011	Veeraputhran	Moithu Moulavi	
2011	Killadi Raman	Chandru	
2012	Orkut Oru Ormakoot		
2012	Asuravithu	Shaikh Muhammed IPS	
2012	Grihanathan	Alex	
2012	Parayan Baaki Vechathu		
2012	Thalsamayam Oru Penkutty	Real TV CEO	
2012	Masters	Isaac Panicker	
2012	Cobra	Alphonse	
2012	MLA Mani: Patham Classum Gusthiyum	SP Benjamin Martin IPS	
2012	Mallu Singh	Valiyamppatu Raghavan Nair	
2012	Grandmaster	Paul Matthew	
2012	Ustad Hotel	Abdul Razak	
2012	Simhasanam	Raman Unni	
2012	Ithra Mathram	Poduval	
2012	Run Baby Run	Rajan Kartha	
2012	Puthiya Theerangal	Thamara's father	Guest appearance
2012	Karpooradeepam		
2012	Face to Face	SP Ramdas IPS	
2012	Poppins		
2012	Akasmikam		Lead role with Shanthi Krishna; delayed movie
2013	Drishyam	Prabhakar	
2013	Ginger	Justice Kuriakose	
2013	Bicycle Thieves		
2013	Geethaanjali	Thampichayan	
2013	Daivathinte Swantham Cleetus	Father Sunny Vadakkumthala	
2013	Careebeyans	Iqbal	
2013	Kunjananthante Kada	Dr.Rahman	
2013	Kadal Kadannu Oru Mathukutty	Abraham & himself	
2013	Progress Report		
2013	Bharya Athra Pora	Dr.Rahman	
2013	Kutteem Kolum		
2013	Breaking News		
2013	Celluloid	Ramakrishna Iyer (I. A. S)	
2013	Annum Innum Ennum	Sidharth Menon	
2013	Players (film)	Hari	Delayed release Shot in 2007
2014	Mylanchi Monchulla Veedu	Kasim	
2014	Koottathil Oral		
2014	Nayana		
2014	Study Tour		
2014	Vellimoonga	Vareedh	
2014	Rajadhiraja	Mahendra Varma IAS	
2014	Villali Veeran	Sidharthan's father	
2014	Avatharam	Divakaran (Guest appearance)	
2014	Mr. Fraud	Rajashekhara Varma	
2014	Garbha Shriman	Doctor	
2014	Bad Boys		
2014	Pakaram		
2014	Swapaanam	Narayanan Namboodiri	
2014	Salalah Mobiles	Ajay Chacko IPS	
2014	Thamarassery To Thailand		
2014	Vasanthathinte Kanal Vazhikalil		
2015	John Honai	John Honai	
2015	Thilothama		
2015	Amar Akbar Anthony	CI Sethunath V. R	
2015	Pathemari	Velayudhan	
2015	Ithinumappuram	Eppachan	
2015	Saigal Padukayaanu	Priest	
2015	Loham	Muhammed Unni	
2015	Fireman	Sakhav Iqbal	
2016	Kappiri Thuruthu	Choonda Masthan	
2016	Kattappanayile Rithwik Roshan	Surendran (Sura)	
2016	Pulimurugan	ACP Iype Zachariah IPS	
2016	Oppam	Baputty	Cameo Appearance
2016	Welcome to Central Jail	Keshavan	
2016	Annmariya Kalippilaanu	Perungudy Baby	
2016	White	Sunnychayan	
2016	Kasaba	IG Chandrashekhar IPS	
2016	Mohavalayam		
2016	Sukhamayirikkatte		
2016	Paavada	Adv. Anantharama Iyer	
2017	Achayans	Rita's father	
2017	Sunday Holiday	Narayanankutty Varayalveli / Nakkutty	
2017	Role Models	Shreya's father	
2017	Pokkiri Simon		Guest Appearance
2017	Villain	DGP	
2017	Vedam		
2017	Ramaleela	Udayabhanu	
2017	Chunkzz	Pappachan	
2017	Velipadinte Pusthakam	Maathan Tharakan	
2017	Adventures of Omanakuttan	Chandrashekhar	
2017	CIA – Comrade In America	Mathew	
2017	Puthan Panam	CI Habeeb Rahman	
2017	Fukri	Sulaiman Fukri	
2018	Diwanjimoola Grand Prix	Jithendran	
2018	Aadhi	Mohan Varma	
2018	Hey Jude	Dominic Rodriguez	
2018	Captain	Maithanam	
2018	Kammara Sambhavam	Bose Kammaran	
2018	Mohanlal	Doctor	cameo appearance
2018	Iblis	Jabbar	
2018	Oru Kuprasidha Payyan	Bharathan	
2018	Aanakkallan	DYSP Aana Esthappan	
2018	Odiyan	Damodharan Nair	
2019	Vijay Superum Pournamiyum	Chandramohan	
2019	Mikhael	George Peter	
2019	Oru Adaar Love	Police officer	
2019	Irupathiyonnaam Noottaandu	Father	
2019	Kodathi Samaksham Balan Vakkeel	Somasekharan Pillai	
2019	Soothrakkaran	Minister for Water Resources	Cameo appearance
2019	Madhura Raja	Rajendra Babu IPS	
2019	Uyare	Raveendran	
2019	Subharathri	Muhammad	
2019	And The Oscar Goes To	Prince	
2019	Isakkinte Ithihasam	Fr.Isak	
2019	Ittymaani: Made in China	Fr. John Paul	
2019	Ganagandharvan	Adv.Manoj	
2019	Happy Sardar	Joysy Kochara	
2019	Ulta	ADGP Mohan Rajeev IPS	
2019	Mamangam	Thalachennor	
2019	My Santa	Paul Pappan	

==== 2020s ====
Year	Title	Role	Notes
2020	Big Brother	Shetty	
2020	Al Mallu	Abraham Tharakan	
2020	Uriyadi	SI Ravisankhar	
2020	Shylock	Commissioner Felix John IPS	
2020	Sufiyum Sujatayum	Sujata's father	
2021	Vellam	Dr. Subrahmanian	
2021	Drishyam 2	Prabhakar	
2021	Varthamanam	Prof. Satheesh Pothuvaal	
2021	Mohan Kumar Fans	Mohan Kumar	
2021	One	Speaker	
2021	Sara's	Dr. Hafiz	
2021	Anugraheethan Antony	Antony's father	
2021	Ellam Sheriyakum	K.C Chacko	
2021	Marakkar: Arabikadalinte Simham	Pattu Marakkar	
2021	Kunjeldho	Professor Gheevarghese	
2022	Aaraattu	CI Sivasankaran	
2022	12th Man	Psychiatrist	
2022	John Luther	Mathews	
2022	Maha Veeryar	MM Veerendra Kumar – Chief Judicial Magistrate	
2022	Theerppu	Basheer Marakkar	
2022	Night Drive	Rajan Kurup	
2022	Peace	Kajaji	
2022	Ini Utharam	Home Minister	
2022	Monster	ADGP Chandrashekhar IPS	
2022	Kannadi		
2023	Ennalum Ente Aliya	Karim	
2023	Christopher	Chief Minister Rajashekaran Menon	
2023	Corona Papers	SI Shankararaman	
2023	2018	Noora's father	
2023	Within Seconds	Minister Sadhanandhan	
2023	Voice of Sathyanathan	Tabala Varkey/ Varkeychayan (Thavala)	
2023	Kasargold	Moosa Haji	
2023	Garudan	Adv. Thomas Iype	
2023	Bandra	Stanley IPS	
2023	Neru	Adv. Rajasekharan	
2024	Qalb	Sayippu	
2024	Anweshippin Kandethum	SP K. R. Rajagopal IPS	
2024	Thankamani	George Peruvathanam	
2024	Golam	Kuriakose Chemmanam	
2024	Jamalinte Punjiri	Ibrahim Sett	
2024	Manorathangal	The Man	Segment: Abhayam Thedi Veendum
2024	Nunakkuzhi	Bhamakrishnan	
2024	Kadha Innuvare	Palipattu Narayanan	
2024	Pushpaka Vimanam	Anas Ikka	
2024	Anand Sreebala	Isaac	
2024	Marco	George D' Peter	
2025	Rekhachithram	Rajendran/Rajan	
2025	Dominic and the Ladies' Purse	Soman Pillai	
2025	Prince and Family	Baby Chakkalakkal	
2025	Raveendra Nee Evide?	George	
2025	Hridayapoorvam	O.K. Panikker	
2026	Chatha Pacha	Mayor S. R. Shivan	
2026	Drishyam 3	Prabhakar	
2026	Kattalan	George D'Peter	
2026	Ananthan Kaadu		Bilingual film
2026	Unmadham	Adv.John Mathew Manjooran	
2026	Aaram		
2026	Udumbanchola Vision	Moosa Haaji	
2026	Prempaatta †	Ex-Militay Thomas	
2026	Pathira Kurukkan †	TBA	
TBA	Ram †	Balakrishnan	

=== Tamil ===
Year	Title	Role	Notes
1996	Subash	Rajasekhar	
2004	Jana	Bhandari	
2017	Rangoon	Gunaseelan	
2017	Vaigai Express	Kulanthai Kumaraswamy	
2018	Bhaskar Oru Rascal	Sanjay's father	
2022	Vendhu Thanindhadhu Kaadu	Kunjukrishnan	
2022	Varalaru Mukkiyam	Velayudhan Kutty	

=== Other languages ===
Year	Title	Role	Language	Notes
1988	New Delhi	Sidhique	Hindi	
1988	Anthima Teerpu	Raju	Telugu	
2013	Naa Bangaaru Talli	Srinivas	Telugu	Simultaneously shot in Malayalam as Ente
2025	Daksha: The Deadly Conspiracy	Balram	Telugu	
TBA	Agninakshathram †	Balram Varma	Telugu	

== As voice actor ==
Year	Title	Dubbed For	Character	Notes
2021	Sunny	Himself	Jacob	
2023	Alone	Himself	Karthavu	

== As producer ==
1. Bada Dosth (2006)
2. Nandanam (2002)
