= Jayaram filmography =

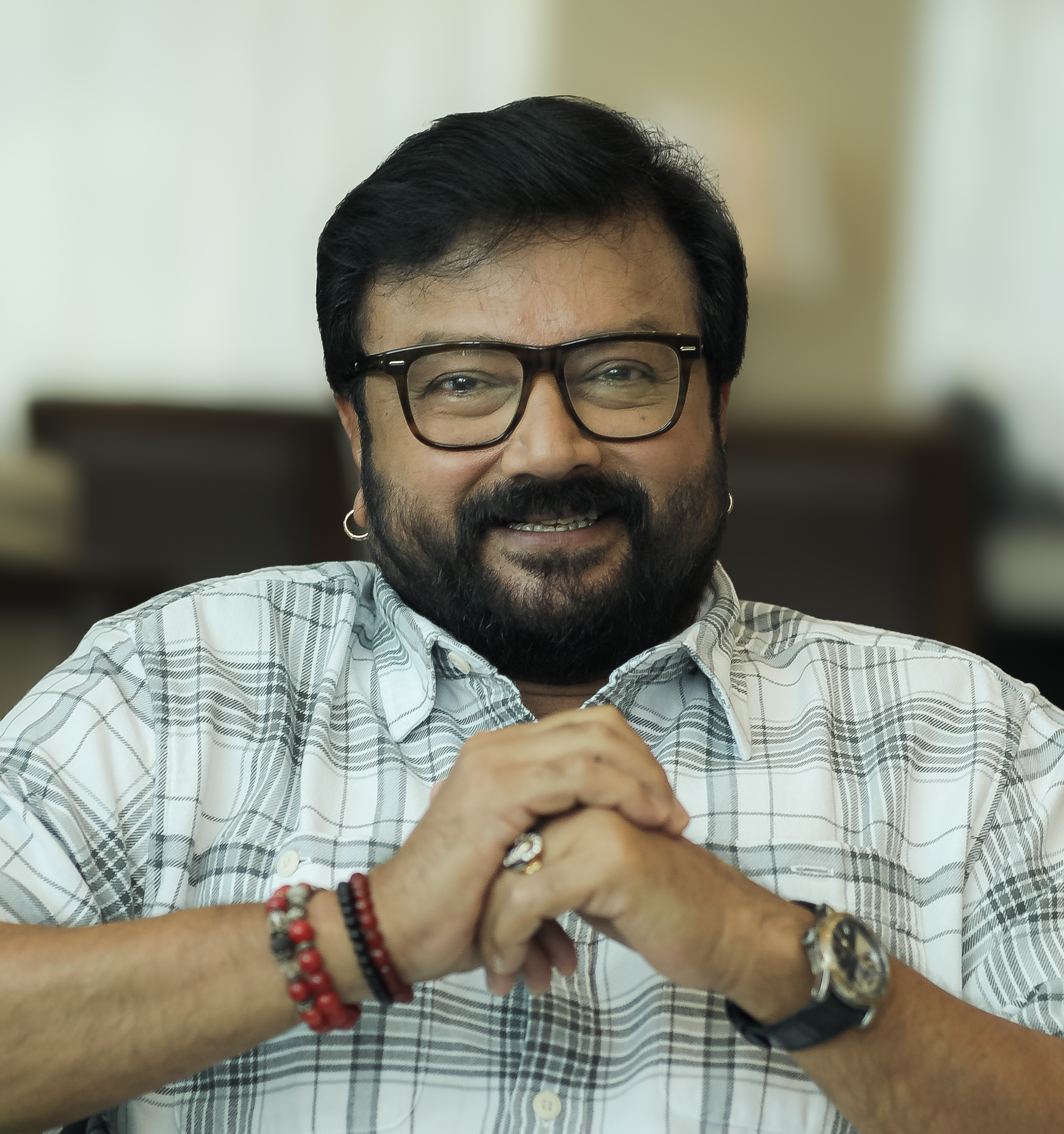
Jayaram in 2026

Jayaram is an Indian actor who acts predominantly in Malayalam in addition to Tamil, Telugu, Hindi and Kannada films. The list of films in which Jayaram played a leading role follows:

== Malayalam films ==
=== 1980s ===
List of Jayaram 1980s Malayalam film credits
| Year | Title | Role |
|---|---|---|
| 1988 | Aparan | Vishwanatha Pillai / Uthaman |
| 1988 | Moonnam Pakkam | Bhasi |
| 1988 | Unnikrishnante Adyathe Christmas | Unnikrishnan |
| 1988 | Dhwani | Sabari |
| 1988 | Witness | Balagopalan |
| 1988 | Ponmuttayidunna Tharavu | Pavithran |
| 1989 | Jaathakam | Madhavanunni |
| 1989 | New Year | Ajith |
| 1989 | Varnam | Haridas |
| 1989 | Chanakyan | Jayaram |
| 1989 | Ulsavapittennu | Rajan |
| 1989 | Swagatham | Ramaswamy |
| 1989 | Puthiya Karukkal | Vinod |
| 1989 | Peruvannapurathe Visheshangal | Sivasankaran |
| 1989 | Mazhavil Kavadi | Velayudhankutty |
| 1989 | Pradeshika Varthakal | Keshavanunni |
| 1989 | Kaalal Pada | Arun Menon |
| 1989 | Chakkikotha Chankaran | Pradeep Thampi |
| 1989 | Artham | Janardanan |
| 1989 | Nagarangalil Chennu Raparkam | Ramachandran |

=== 1990s ===
List of Jayaram 1990s Malayalam film credits
| Year | Title | Role |
|---|---|---|
| 1990 | Varthamana Kalam | Brahmadattan |
| 1990 | Pavam Pavam Rajakumaran | Radhika's relative |
| 1990 | Malootty | Unnikrishnan |
| 1990 | Thoovalsparsham | Unni Krishnan / Unni |
| 1990 | Thalayanamanthram | Mohanan |
| 1990 | Vachanam | Gopan |
| 1990 | Randam Varavu | Jayakumar |
| 1990 | Innale | Sarath Menon |
| 1990 | Shubhayathra | Vishnu |
| 1990 | Radha Madhavam | Hari |
| 1990 | Pavakkooth | Prakash |
| 1990 | Nanma Niranjavan Sreenivasan | Srinivasan |
| 1990 | Marupuram | Sethumadhavan |
| 1990 | Maalayogam | Rameshan |
| 1990 | Kuruppinte Kanakku Pustakom | Shanthan |
| 1991 | Sandesham | K R Prakashan |
| 1991 | Pookkalam Varavayi | Nandan |
| 1991 | Mukha Chithram | Mathukutty/Sethumadhavan/Vareechan |
| 1991 | Koodikazhcha | Sunny |
| 1991 | Kilukkampetti | Prakash Menon |
| 1991 | Keli | Narayanankutty |
| 1991 | Kankettu | Raju |
| 1991 | Kadinjool Kalyanam | Sudhakaran |
| 1991 | Georgekutty C/O Georgekutty | Georgekutty |
| 1991 | Ezhunnallathu | Josutty (Kunjumon) |
| 1991 | Ennum Nanmakal | Sivan |
| 1991 | Chanchattam | Mohan |
| 1991 | Bhoomika | Unnikrishnan |
| 1991 | Kanalkkattu | Benny |
| 1992 | Advaitham | Vasu |
| 1992 | Ootty Pattanam | Pavithran |
| 1992 | My Dear Muthachan | Parthasarathi |
| 1992 | First Bell | Pirappankodu Prahakaran |
| 1992 | Ezhara Ponnana | Balan/Vikraman |
| 1992 | Ayalathe Addeham | Premachandran |
| 1992 | Aayushkalam | Aby Mathew |
| 1993 | Journalist | Jayachandran |
| 1993 | Dhruvam | Veerasimha Mannadiyar |
| 1993 | Vakkeel Vasudev | Venu |
| 1993 | Samagamam | Johnson |
| 1993 | Paithrukam | Chithrabhanu |
| 1993 | Oru Kadankatha Pole | Venugopal |
| 1993 | Bandhukkal Sathrukkal | Aanamala Haridas |
| 1993 | Aagneyam | Madhavan Kutty |
| 1993 | Meleparambil Aanveedu | Harikrishen |
| 1993 | Kavadiyattam | Unni |
| 1993 | Customs Diary | Ananthakrishnan |
| 1994 | Vadhu Doctoranu | Sidharthan |
| 1994 | Sudhinam | Sahadevan |
| 1994 | CID Unnikrishnan B.A., B.Ed. | Unnikrishnan |
| 1995 | Aniyan Bava Chetan Bava | Premachandran |
| 1995 | Mangalam Veettil Manaseswari Gupta | Jayadevan |
| 1995 | Kusruthikaatu | Nandagopal |
| 1995 | Aadyathe Kanmani | Balachandran Unnithan |
| 1995 | Sreeragam | Venkiteswaran |
| 1995 | Minnaminuginum Minnukettu | Hari |
| 1995 | Vrudhanmare Sookshikkuka | Vijay Krishnan |
| 1995 | Puthukkottayile Puthumanavalan | Ganabhooshanam Girish Cochin |
| 1995 | Indian Military Intelligence | Song Appearance |
| 1996 | Swapna Lokathe Balabhaskaran | Balabhaskaran |
| 1996 | Thooval Kottaram | Mohanachandran Pothuval |
| 1996 | Kaliveedu | Mahesh Sivan |
| 1996 | Dilliwala Rajakumaran | Appu |
| 1996 | Aramana Veedum Anjoorekkarum | Kannappan |
| 1997 | Superman | Hareendran |
| 1997 | Krishnagudiyil Oru Pranayakalathu | Giri Menon |
| 1997 | Kilukil Pambaram | Ananthan |
| 1997 | Karunyam | Satheeshan |
| 1997 | Kadhanayakan | Ramanathan |
| 1997 | Irattakuttikalude Achan | Rajeevan |
| 1997 | The Car | Mahadevan |
| 1998 | Chitrashalabham | Devan |
| 1998 | Kusruthi Kuruppu | Kurup |
| 1998 | Kaikudunna Nilavu | Maheendran |
| 1998 | Summer in Bethlahem | Ravishankar |
| 1998 | Sooryaputhran | Jeevan |
| 1998 | Sneham | Padmanabhan Nair |
| 1998 | Kottaram Veettile Apputtan | Apputtan |
| 1998 | Ayushman Bhava | Suryan |
| 1999 | Pattabhishekam | Vishnu Narayanan |
| 1999 | Friends | Aravindan |
| 1999 | Veendum Chila Veettukaryangal | Roy K Thomas |
| 1999 | Njangal Santhushtaranu | Sanjeevan Pillai I.P.S |

=== 2000s ===
List of Jayaram 2000s Malayalam film credits
| Year | Title | Role | Notes |
|---|---|---|---|
| 2000 | Swayamvara Panthal | Deepu | |
| 2000 | Nadan Pennum Natupramaniyum | Govindankutty | |
| 2000 | Millennium Stars | Shankar | |
| 2000 | Kochu Kochu Santhoshangal | Gopan | |
| 2000 | Daivathinte Makan | Sunny | |
| 2001 | Vakkalathu Narayanankutty | Narayanankutty | |
| 2001 | Sharja To Sharja | Nandagopal Vishwanathan | |
| 2001 | Naranathu Thampuran | Anandan | |
| 2001 | Uthaman | Uthaman | |
| 2001 | Theerthadanam | Karunakaran | |
| 2001 | One Man Show | Jayakrishnan | |
| 2002 | Sesham | Lonappan | |
| 2002 | Malayali Mamanu Vanakkam | Anandakuttan | |
| 2002 | Yathrakarude Sradhakku | Ramanujan | |
| 2003 | Ente Veedu Appuvinteyum | Vishwanathan | |
| 2003 | Ivar | Ragahva Menon | |
| 2003 | Manassinakkare | Reji | |
| 2004 | Njan Salperu Ramankutty | Ramankutty | |
| 2004 | Mayilattam | Devan and Singanallur Pazhani | Dual role |
| 2004 | Vettam | Taxi driver | Uncredited |
| 2004 | Amrutham | Gopinathan Nair | |
| 2005 | Finger Print | Vivek Varma | |
| 2005 | Alice in Wonderland | Alby | |
| 2005 | Pauran | Divakaran | |
| 2005 | Sarkar Dada | Mukundan Menon | |
| 2006 | Madhuchandralekha | Madhavan | |
| 2006 | Aanachandam | Krishnaprasad | |
| 2006 | Moonnamathoral | Chandra | |
| 2006 | Kanaka Simhasanam | Kasargode Kanakambaran | |
| 2007 | Anchil Oral Arjunan | Sudheendran | |
| 2007 | Sooryan | Suryan | |
| 2008 | Magic Lamp | Chandrasenan, Sunny Kuruvilla, Dr Nandakumar and Khalid | Four roles |
| 2008 | Novel | Sethunathan | |
| 2008 | Veruthe Oru Bharya | Sugunan | |
| 2008 | Parthan Kanda Paralokam | Parthasarathy (Parthan) | |
| 2008 | Twenty: 20 | Dr. Vinod Bhaskar | Extended cameo |
| 2009 | Samastha Keralam PO | Prabhakaran | |
| 2009 | Bhagyadevatha | Benny Chacko | |
| 2009 | Winter | Dr. Ramdas | |
| 2009 | Rahasya Police | SI Rajan and DYSP Rajamani (Chalai Mani) | Dual role; dubbed in Tamil as Crime File |
| 2009 | Kana Kanmani | Roy | |
| 2009 | Seetha Kalyanam | Sreeni | |
| 2009 | My Big Father | Alby | |

=== 2010s ===
List of Jayaram 2010s Malayalam film credits
| Year | Title | Role | Notes |
|---|---|---|---|
| 2010 | Four Friends | Roy Mathew | |
| 2010 | Happy Husbands | Mukundan Menon | |
| 2010 | Kadha Thudarunnu | Preman | |
| 2011 | Kudumbasree Travels | Aravindan | |
| 2011 | Makeup Man | Bala Chandran | |
| 2011 | Chinatown | Zakaria | |
| 2011 | Seniors | Padmanabhan | |
| 2011 | Ulakam Chuttum Valiban | Jayashankar | |
| 2011 | Swapna Sanchari | Ajayachandran | |
| 2011 | Naayika | Anand | |
| 2012 | Njanum Ente Familiyum | Dr. Dinanathan | |
| 2012 | Pakarnnattam | Thomas | |
| 2012 | Thiruvambadi Thamban | Thiruvambadi Thampan Tharakan | |
| 2012 | Manthrikan | Mukundan Unni | |
| 2012 | Madirasi | Chandran Pillai | |
| 2013 | Lucky Star | Renjith | |
| 2013 | Bharya Athra Pora | Sathya Nathan | |
| 2013 | Kadal Kadannu Oru Maathukutty | Himself | Cameo |
| 2013 | Ginger | Vivekanandan | |
| 2013 | Nadan | Devadas Sargavedi | |
| 2014 | Salaam Kashmir | Major Sreekumar | |
| 2014 | Swapaanam | Unni | |
| 2014 | Onnum Mindathe | Sachithanandan | |
| 2014 | Ulsaha Committee | Apoorvan | |
| 2014 | Njangalude Veettile Athidhikal | Advocate Manoj | |
| 2014 | Mylanchi Monchulla Veedu | Dr.Mammootty/Dr.Madhavankutty | |
| 2015 | Sir C. P. | Sir Chethimattathu Philip | |
| 2015 | Thinkal Muthal Velli Vare | Jayadevan Chungathara | |
| 2016 | Aadupuliyattam | Sathyajith | Dubbed in Tamil as Shenbaga Kottai (2018); Dubbed in Hindi as Mera Badla (2018) |
| 2017 | Sathya | Sathya Subramaniam | |
| 2017 | Achayans | Roy Thottathil | |
| 2017 | Aakashamittayi | Jayashankar | |
| 2018 | Daivame Kaithozham K. Kumar Akanam | K. Kumar | |
| 2018 | Panchavarnathatha | Vijayan Joseph Muhammed | |
| 2019 | Lonappante Mamodeesa | Lonappan | |
| 2019 | My Great Grandfather | Michael | |
| 2019 | Marconi Mathai | Marconi Mathai | |
| 2019 | Pattabhiraman | Pattabhiraman | |

=== 2020s ===
List of Jayaram 2020s Malayalam film credits
| Year | Title | Role | Notes |
|---|---|---|---|
| 2022 | Makal | Nandakumar | |
| 2024 | Abraham Ozler | Abraham Ozler | |
| 2026 | Ashakal Aayiram | Hariharan | |

== Tamil films ==
Key
| † | Denotes films that have not yet been released |

List of Jayaram Tamil film credits
| Year | Title | Role | Notes |
|---|---|---|---|
| 1993 | Gokulam | Chellappa | |
| 1993 | Purusha Lakshanam | Nandagopal | |
| 1994 | Priyanka | Shekar | |
| 1994 | Manasu Rendum Pudhusu | Thomas | |
| 1994 | Nila | Ayyanar | |
| 1995 | Murai Maman | Sirusu | |
| 1995 | Kolangal | Anand | |
| 1996 | Pudhu Nilavu | Anand | |
| 1996 | Parivattam | Muthu alias Pichaimuthu | |
| 1997 | Periya Idathu Mappillai | Gopalakrishnan | |
| 1997 | Paththini | Raghupathi | |
| 1998 | Naam Iruvar Namakku Iruvar | Pooja's uncle | Guest Appearance |
| 2000 | Thenali | Dr. Kailash | |
| 2002 | Panchathantiram | Ayyappan Nair | |
| 2002 | Naina | Annamalai and Pasupathy | Dual role |
| 2003 | Julie Ganapathi | Tenkasi Balakumaran | |
| 2003 | Paarai | Jayaram | |
| 2003 | Nala Damayanthi | Himself | Guest Appearance |
| 2006 | Paramasivan | Ayyappan Nair | |
| 2008 | Pirivom Santhippom | Doctor | |
| 2008 | Panchamirtham | Mareesan | |
| 2008 | Aegan | Albert Adiya Patham | |
| 2008 | Saroja | ACP Ravichandran | |
| 2008 | Dhaam Dhoom | Raghavan Nambiar | |
| 2010 | Kola Kolaya Mundhirika | Mathrubootham | |
| 2011 | Ponnar Sankar | Nellian Kodan | |
| 2011 | Sabash Sariyana Potti | JR | |
| 2012 | Thuppakki | Major V. Ravichandran | |
| 2015 | Thunai Mudhalvar | Chinnapaandi | |
| 2015 | Uttama Villain | Jacob Zachariah | |
| 2018 | Bhaagamathie | Eswar Prasad | |
| 2018 | Party | Rajasekara Pandian ("RSP"), Casino Kingpin | Unreleased |
| 2020 | Putham Pudhu Kaalai | Rajeev Padmanabhan | Segment "Ilamai Idho Idho" |
| 2022 | Ponniyin Selvan: I | Azhwarkadiyan Nambi | |
| 2023 | Ponniyin Selvan: II | Azhwarkadiyan Nambi | |
| 2024 | The Greatest of All Time | Nazeer | |
| 2025 | Retro | Dr. Chaplin Lolly | |
| 2026 | Kara | Muthu Selvan | |
| 2026 | Parimala and Co | Parimala | |
| 2026 | G.D.N | Ambalapara Krishnan | |
| 2026 | Good News † | TBA | |

== Telugu films ==
Key
| † | Denotes films that have not yet been released |

List of Jayaram Telugu film credits
| Year | Title | Role | Notes |
|---|---|---|---|
| 2018 | Bhaagamathie | Eswar Prasad | |
| 2020 | Ala Vaikunthapurramuloo | Ramachandra | |
| 2022 | Radhe Shyam | Ship Captain | Telugu/Hindi Bilingual film ; Special appearance |
| 2022 | Dhamaka | JP | |
| 2023 | Ravanasura | ACP Hanumanth Rao | |
| 2023 | Kushi | Thomas | |
| 2023 | Hi Nanna | Varsha and Neha's father | |
| 2024 | Guntur Kaaram | Bhogineni Satyanarayana alias "Royal" Satyam | |
| 2025 | Game Changer | Bobbili Munimanikyam | |
| 2025 | Mirai | Agasthya Muni | |

== Kannada films ==
List of Jayaram Kannada film credits
| Year | Title | Role | Notes |
|---|---|---|---|
| 2023 | Ghost | ACP Chengappa | |
| 2025 | Kantara: Chapter 1 | Rajashekara | |
| 2026 | Bail | Robert | |

== Television ==
- All productions in Malayalam unless otherwise indicated

List of Jayaram television credits
| Year | Title | Role | Channel | Notes | Ref. |
|---|---|---|---|---|---|
| 2001 | Snehasammanam | Himself | Surya TV | serial | |
| 2012 | Ningalkkum Aakaam Kodeeshwaran | Contestant | Asianet | Game Show | |
| 2013 | Katha Ithuvare | Guest | Mazhavil Manorama | | |
| 2014 | Onnum Onnum Moonu | Guest | Mazhavil Manorama | | |
| 2015 | Cinema Chirima | Guest | Mazhavil Manorama | | |
| 2016 | Laughing Villa | Guest | Surya TV | | |
| 2016 | Jayaraminte Swantham Kalidasan | Guest | Mazhavil Manorama | | |
| 2017 | Onnum Onnum Moonu | Guest | Mazhavil Manorama | Talk Show | |
| 2017 | Comedy Utsavam | Guest | Flowers TV | Comedy Show | |
| 2018 | D3 D 4 Dance | Guest | Mazhavil Manorama | | |
| 2018 | Tharathinoppam | Guest | Mazhavil Manorama | | |
| 2018 | Sell Me The Answer | Contestant | Asianet | Game Show | |
| 2018 | Nakshathrathilakkam | Guest | Mazhavil Manorama | | |
| 2019 | Comedy Stars | Special Guest | Asianet | 1111th Episode Celebration | |
| 2019 | Paadam Namukku Paadam | Celebrity Guest on Grand Finale | Mazhavil Manorama | Reality Show | |
| 2019 | JB Junction | Guest | Kairali TV | Talk Show | |
| 2020 | Comedy Super Show | Mentor | Flowers TV | Comedy show | |
| 2021 | Let's Rock N' Roll | Chief Guest | Zee Keralam | Onam Special Program | |
| 2021 | Flowers Oru Kodi | Contestant | Flowers TV | Game show | |
| 2022 | Super 4 Juniors | Guest | Mazhavil Manorama | | |
| 2024 | Star Singer season 9 | Guest | Asianet | Reality show | |

== Dubbing artist ==
List of Jayaram dubbing credits
| Year | Title | Dubbed For | Character | Language |
|---|---|---|---|---|
| 1988 | Witness | Alex Mathew | Hendry | Malayalam |
| 1992 | Kanalkkattu | Keerikkadan Jose | Karim Bhai | Malayalam |
| 1992 | Kankettu | Lalu Alex | Jaffer | Malayalam |

== As playback singer ==
List of Jayaram playback singing credits
| Year | Film/Album | Song(s) | Co-Singer(s) | Lyricist | Music Director | Language |
|---|---|---|---|---|---|---|
| 1997 | Kadhanayakan | Good Morning | Kalabhavan Mani, Janardhanan, KPAC Lalitha | S Ramesan Nair | Mohan Sithara | Malayalam |
| 2003 | Ente Veedu Appoontem | Thappo Thappo | Kalidas Jayaram | Gireesh Puthenchery | Ouseppachan | Malayalam |
| 2004 | Mayilattam | Thakkida Tharikida | MG Sreekumar | Gireesh Puthenchery | M Jayachandran | Malayalam |
| 2007 | Thamarakannan | Unaroo Unaroo | Manjari, Kavitha Jayaram, Naya | Chovalloor Krishnankutty | Anand | Malayalam |
| 2011 | Sevenes | Kaalamonnu Kaalaal | Arun Alat, Ranjith, Sreenath | Santhosh Varma | Bijibal | Malayalam |
| 2013 | Pakarnnattam | Varika Nee | Sabitha Jayaraj | C P Udayabanu | Kailas Menon | Malayalam |
| 2014 | Salaam Kashmir | Kannaadippuzhayile | Shweta Mohan | Rafeeq Ahammed | M Jayachandran | Malayalam |
| 2016 | Aadupuliyattam | Manjakattil | Ramesh Pisharody | | Ratheesh Vega | Malayalam |
