= A. Sreekar Prasad filmography =

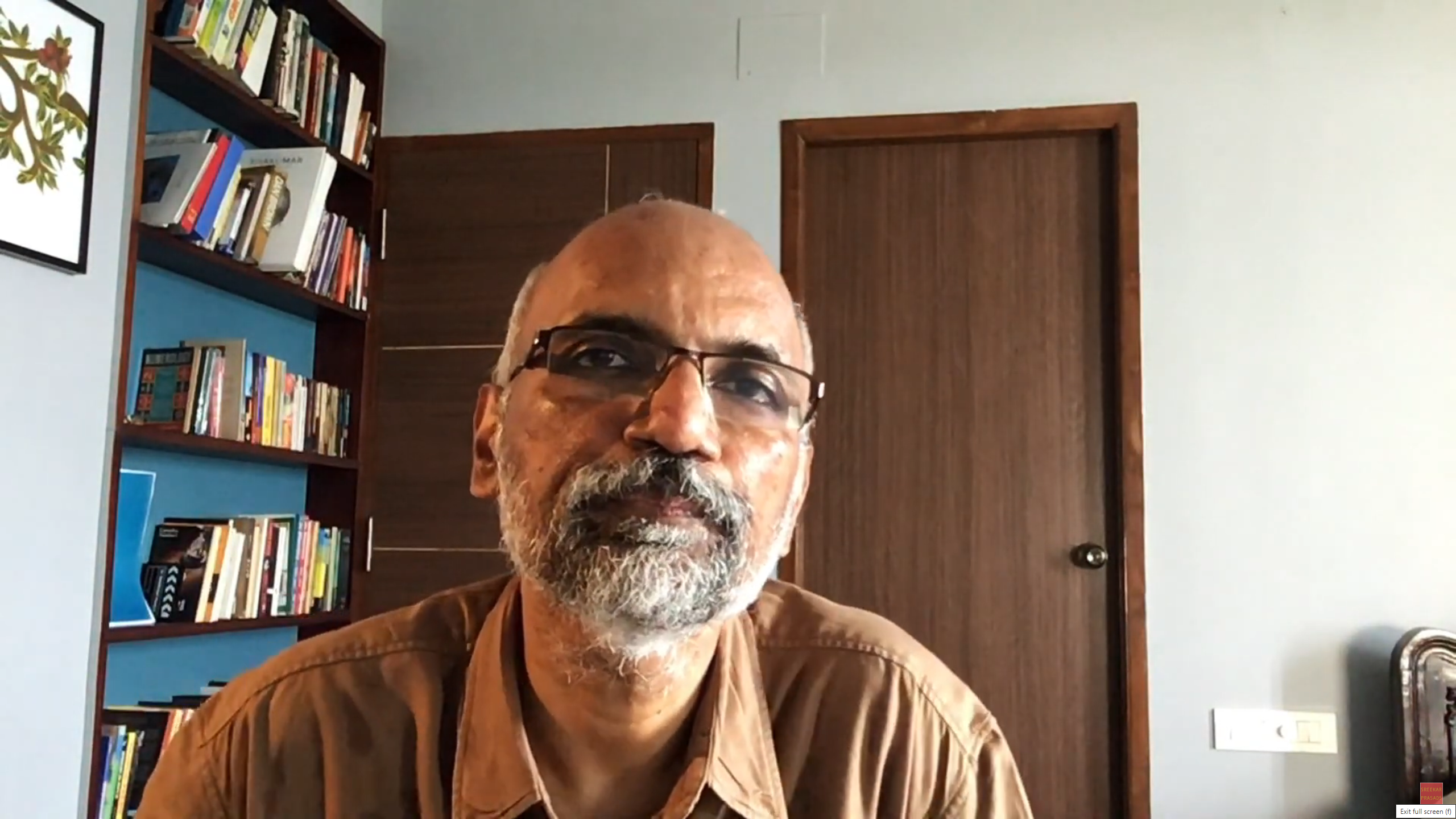
Sreekar Prasad in 2020, during a virtual Q&A session on his YouTube channel

Akkineni Sreekar Prasad is an Indian film editor known for his extensive work across multiple Indian film industries, including Hindi, Malayalam, Telugu and Tamil. He is the son of Akkineni Sanjeevi, a Telugu film editor and director who introduced him to film editing, and the nephew of filmmaker L.V. Prasad. He assisted his father for about twenty films. Sreekar has been active in the industry for over three decades and has collaborated with some of the most prominent directors in Indian cinema, including Mani Ratnam, Vishal Bhardwaj, AR Murugadoss, Vishnuvardhan, Prasanna Vithanage and Santosh Sivan.

Born into a Telugu family in Chennai, Sreekar is a graduate in literature from the University of Madras. He made his debut as a co-editor with the 1986 film Swati, and his first independent editing work was on the Hindi film Raakh (1989). His work on Raakh earned him the National Award for Best Editing. Over a career spanning more than 35 years, Sreekar has edited over 600 films. He holds a record with nine National Film Awards, seven of which are for Best Editing, making him the most awarded editor in this category. His awards have been conferred by five different Presidents of India.

He was also honoured with the first-ever Special Jury Award for editing, recognizing his exceptional contributions to the field. Sreekar's contributions to Indian cinema were acknowledged in the Limca Book of Records 'People of the Year – 2013' list. He also holds a record for editing films in the most languages, with works spanning 17 different languages to date. Alai Payuthey marked Sreekar's first collaboration with Mani Ratnam on a non-linear narrative. To simplify the narrative, they used slo-mo effects and color changes to differentiate episodes. Their team created 17–18 different versions of the film.

== Selected filmography ==
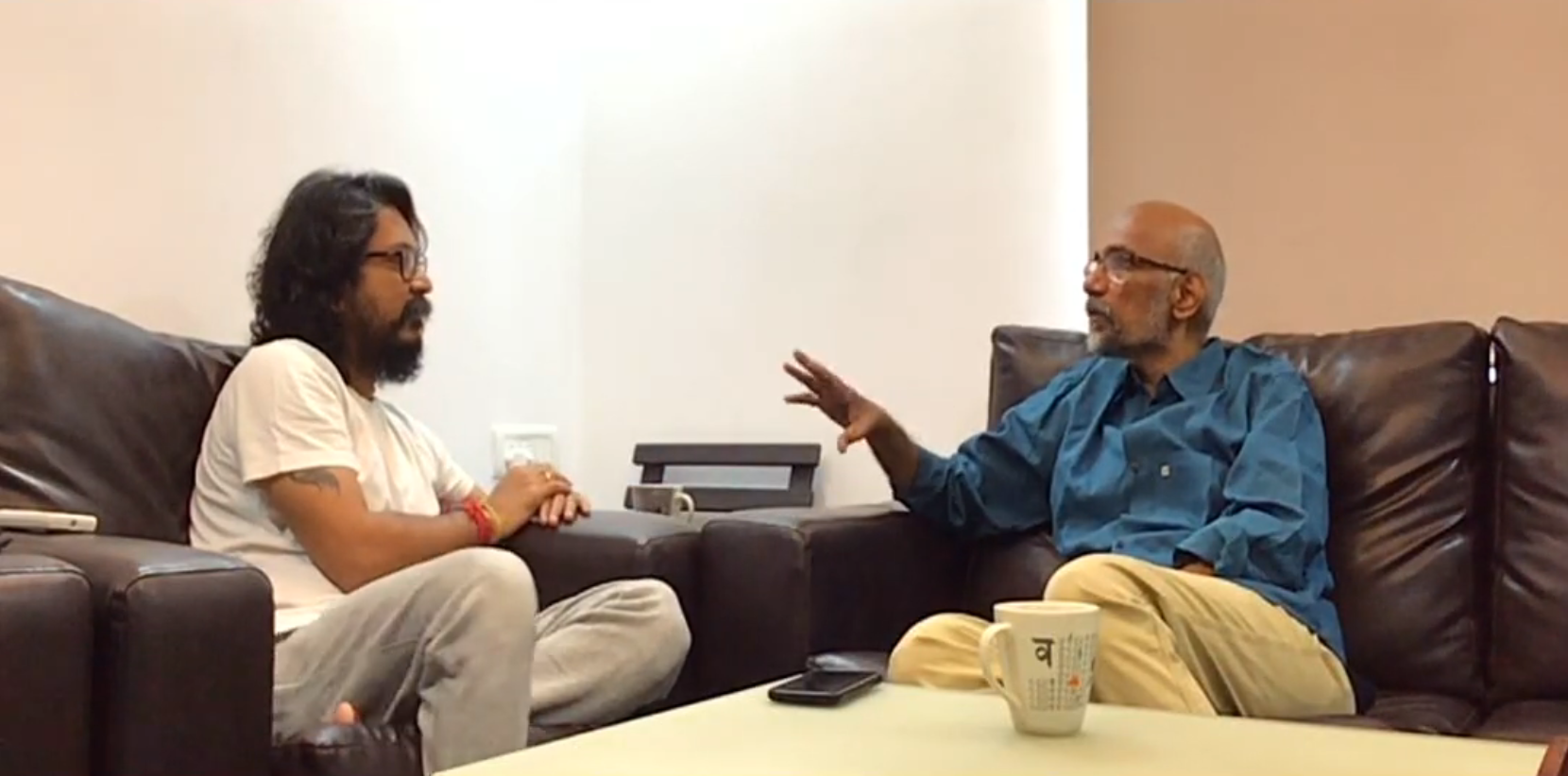
Vishnuvardhan (left) and Sreekar Prasad (right) in a YouTube video on the relationship between the film editor and director

List of A. Sreekar Prasad film creditsList of Ryan Reynolds film credits
Year	Title	Language	Notes	Ref.
1986	Swati	Hindi		
1986	Captain Nagarjun	Telugu		
1989	Raakh	Hindi	Debut as an independent editor in Hindi, 1st of 9 National Film Award for Best Editing	
1989	Simha Swapnam	Telugu		
1990	Neti Siddhartha	Telugu		
1990	Vyooham	Malayalam	Debut in Malayalam	
1991	Seetharamayya Gari Manavaralu	Telugu		
1991	Jaitra Yatra	Telugu		
1991	Abhayam	Malayalam		
1992	President Gari Pellam	Telugu		
1992	Yoddha	Malayalam	1st of 5 Kerala State Film Award for Best Editing	
1992	Soorya Manasam	Malayalam		
1993	Gandharvam	Malayalam		
1993	Janam	Malayalam		
1993	Addeham Enna Iddeham	Malayalam		
1993	Allari Alludu	Telugu		
1994	Pidakkozhi Koovunna Noottandu	Malayalam		
1995	Nirnayam	Malayalam		
1995	Avittam Thirunaal Aarogya Sriman	Malayalam		
1995	Parvathy Parinayam	Malayalam		
1995	Maanthrikam	Malayalam		
1995	Simhavalan Menon	Malayalam		
1996	Kudumbakodathi	Malayalam		
1996	Manthrika Kuthira	Malayalam		
1996	Rag Birag	Assamese	2nd National Film Award for Best Editing	
1996	Nauka Charitramu	English	Documentary; 3rd National Film Award for Best Non-Feature Film Editing	
1997	Ramayanam	Telugu		
1997	Poonilamazha	Malayalam		
1997	Masmaram	Malayalam		
1997	Annamayya	Telugu		
1998	The Terrorist	Tamil	Debut in Tamil, Consecutive National Film Award for Best Editing	
1998	Uyirodu Uyiraga	Tamil		
1998	Chinthavishtayaya Shyamala	Malayalam		
1998	Kanmadam	Malayalam		
1999	F.I.R.	Malayalam		
1999	Jalamarmmaram	Malayalam		
1999	English Pellam East Godavari Mogudu	Telugu		
1999	Kannezhuthi Pottum Thottu	Malayalam		
1999	Njangal Santhushtaranu	Malayalam		
1999	Stalin Sivadas	Malayalam		
1999	Vanaprastham	Malayalam	5th National Film Award for Best Editing	
2000	Malli	Tamil		
2000	Annayya	Telugu		
2000	Karunam	Malayalam		
2000	Joker	Malayalam		
2000	Priyam	Malayalam		
2000	Sathyam Sivam Sundaram	Malayalam		
2000	Rhythm	Tamil		
2000	Alai Payuthey	Tamil	1st of 13 collaborations with Mani Ratnam, 18 versions were edited before arriving at the final	
2000	Manoharam	Telugu		
2000	Okkadu Chalu	Telugu		
2000	Darling Darling	Malayalam		
2000	Mark Anthony	Malayalam		
2000	Nadan Pennum Natupramaniyum	Malayalam		
2000	Snehapoorvam Anna	Malayalam		
2000	Nuvve Kavali	Telugu		
2001	Vakkalathu Narayanankutty	Malayalam		
2001	Dumm Dumm Dumm	Tamil		
2001	Citizen	Tamil		
2001	Dil Chahta Hai	Hindi		
2001	Poovellam Un Vasam	Tamil		
2001	Megasandesam	Malayalam		
2001	Déjà vu	English	Also co-producer	
2001	Kutty	Tamil		
2001	Akasa Veedhilo	Telugu		
2001	Naranathu Thampuran	Malayalam		
2001	Sathyameva Jayathe	Malayalam		
2001	Nuvvu Naaku Nachav	Telugu		
2001	Theerthadanam	Malayalam		
2002	Red	Tamil		
2002	Kannathil Muthamittal	Tamil	6th National Film Award for Best Editing	
2002	Bokshu – The Myth	English		
2002	Five Star	Tamil		
2002	Malayali Mamanu Vanakkam	Malayalam		
2002	Phantom	Malayalam		
2002	Saathiya	Hindi		
2002	Khadgam	Telugu		
2002	Manmadhudu	Telugu		
2002	Nuvve Nuvve	Telugu		
2002	Sesham	Malayalam		
2002	Naanu Naane	Kannada		
2003	Okkadu	Telugu		
2003	Ottesi Cheputunna	Telugu		
2003	Oka Raju Oka Rani	Telugu		
2003	Alai	Tamil		
2003	Kurumbu	Tamil	1st of 10 collaborations with Vishnuvardhan	
2003	Tehzeeb	Hindi		
2004	Malliswari	Telugu		
2004	Naani	Telugu		
2004	Gowri	Telugu		
2004	Yuva	Hindi		
2004	Aayitha Ezhuthu	Tamil		
2004	Arjun	Telugu		
2004	Aparichithan	Malayalam		
2004	Morning Raga	English		
2005	Kanda Naal Mudhal	Tamil		
2005	Navarasa	Tamil		
2005	Anandabhadram	Malayalam		
2005	Arinthum Ariyamalum	Tamil		
2005	Mangal Pandey: The Rising	Hindi		
2005	Taj Mahal: An Eternal Love Story	Hindustani		
2005	Krithyam	Malayalam		
2005	Kanchanamala Cable TV	Telugu		
2005	Athadu	Telugu		
2005	Allari Bullodu	Telugu		
2006	Chukkallo Chandrudu	Telugu		
2006	Pattiyal	Tamil		
2006	Sri Ramadasu	Telugu		
2006	Kittu	Telugu		
2006	Manasu Palike Mouna Raagam	Telugu		
2006	Sainikudu	Telugu		
2007	Sringaram	Tamil		
2007	Jagadam	Telugu		
2007	Billa	Tamil		
2007	Guru	Hindi		
2007	Classmates	Telugu		
2007	Kattradhu Thamizh	Tamil	Non-linear narrative	
2007	Delhii Heights	Hindi		
2007	Gandhi, My Father	Hindi		
2008	Sila Nerangalil	Tamil		
2008	Jalsa	Telugu		
2008	Firaaq	Hindi	7th National Film Award for Best Editing	
2008	Chintakayala Ravi	Telugu		
2008	Pandurangadu	Telugu		
2009	Akasa Kusum	Sinhala	Also producer	
2009	Konchem Ishtam Konchem Kashtam	Telugu		
2009	13B	Hindi/Tamil		
2009	Sarvam	Tamil		
2009	Ganesh Just Ganesh	Telugu		
2009	Savaari	Kannada		
2009	Kaminey	Hindi	First collaboration with Vishal Bhardwaj; 8th National Award; First-ever Special Jury Award for an Editor.	
2009	Kerala Varma Pazhassi Raja	Malayalam	First collaboration with Vishal Bhardwaj; 8th National Award; First-ever Special Jury Award for an Editor.	
2010	Kutty Srank	Malayalam	First collaboration with Vishal Bhardwaj; 8th National Award; First-ever Special Jury Award for an Editor.	
2010	Police Police	Telugu		
2010	Angaadi Theru	Tamil		
2010	Raavan	Hindi		
2010	Raavanan	Tamil		
2010	Drohi	Tamil		
2010	Khaleja	Telugu		
2011	7 Khoon Maaf	Hindi		
2011	Sengadal	Tamil		
2011	Shaitan	Hindi		
2011	Urumi	Malayalam		
2011	Mausam	Hindi		
2011	Panjaa	Telugu		
2012	Rushi	Telugu		
2012	Ishq	Telugu		
2012	Arjun: The Warrior Prince	Hindi		
2012	Saguni	Tamil		
2012	Cocktail	Hindi		
2012	Thuppakki	Tamil	1st of 7 collaborations with AR Murugadoss	
2012	Ko Yad	Assamese		
2013	Kadal	Tamil		
2013	David	Hindi		
2013	Ek Thi Daayan	Hindi		
2013	Thanga Meenkal	Tamil		
2013	Neelakasham Pachakadal Chuvanna Bhoomi	Malayalam		
2013	Arrambam	Tamil		
2013	Ivan Veramathiri	Tamil		
2013	Swapaanam	Malayalam		
2013	Matru Ki Bijlee Ka Mandola	Hindi		
2014	Pannaiyarum Padminiyum	Tamil		
2014	Maan Karate	Tamil		
2014	Pizza	Hindi		
2014	Yaan	Tamil		
2014	Finding Fanny	English		
2014	Kaththi	Tamil		
2015	Touring Talkies	Tamil	Anthology film; segment Selvi 5am Vaguppu	
2015	Oh Kadhal Kanmani	Tamil		
2015	Yatchan	Tamil		
2015	Puli	Tamil		
2015	Talvar	Hindi	Filmfare award for Best Editing	
2015	Naanum Rowdydhaan	Tamil		
2015	10 Endrathukulla	Tamil		
2015	Dau Huduni Methai	Bodo		
2016	Nenu Sailaja	Telugu		
2016	Sethupathi	Tamil		
2016	Akira	Hindi		
2016	Idolle Ramayana	Kannada; Telugu		
2016	Sarvagunakar Srimanta Sankardeva	Assamese		
2017	OK Jaanu	Hindi		
2017	Ghazi	Telugu; Hindi		
2017	Kaatru Veliyidai	Tamil		
2017	Kalki	Tamil		
2017	Hindi Medium	Hindi		
2017	Taramani	Tamil		
2017	Spyder	Telugu; Tamil		
2017	Solo	Malayalam; Tamil		
2017	Vunnadhi Okate Zindagi	Telugu		
2018	Thaana Serndha Kootam	Tamil		
2018	Rangula Ratnam	Telugu		
2018	Aami	Malayalam		
2018	Bharat Ane Nenu	Telugu		
2018	Kaala	Tamil		
2018	Chekka Chivantha Vaanam	Tamil		
2018	Kayamkulam Kochunni	Malayalam		
2018	Sarkar	Tamil		
2018	Pataakha	Hindi		
2018	Manto	Hindi		
2018	Padi Padi Leche Manasu	Telugu		
2019	To Let	Tamil		
2019	Oolu	Malayalam	42nd Film Critics Award – Best Editor	
2019	Yatra	Telugu		
2019	Chitralahari	Telugu		
2019	Super 30	Hindi		
2019	Saaho	Telugu; Hindi		
2019	Sye Raa Narasimha Reddy	Telugu		
2019	Prathi Poovankozhi	Malayalam		
2019	In the Land of Poison Women	Pangchenpa		
2019	Happi	Hindi	Co-edited with Asif Ali Shaikh	
2019	Gaadi	Sinhala		
2020	Darbar	Tamil		
2020	Angrezi Medium	Hindi		
2020	Raat Akeli Hai	Hindi		
2020	Putham Pudhu Kaalai	Tamil	Anthology	
2020	Addham	Telugu	Web series	
2021	C/o Kaadhal	Tamil		
2021	Bansuri: The Flute	Hindi		
2021	Shershaah	Hindi		
2021	Shiddat	Hindi		
2021	Sridevi Soda Center	Telugu		
2021	Aakashavaani	Telugu		
2021	Sivaranjiniyum Innum Sila Pengalum	Tamil	Anthology, 9th National Film Award for Best Editing	
2022	Aadavallu Meeku Johaarlu	Telugu		
2022	RRR	Telugu	Nominated for Best Editing in the 6th Hollywood Critics Association Film Awards	
2022	Dasvi	Hindi		
2022	Kaathuvaakula Rendu Kaadhal	Tamil		
2022	CBI 5: The Brain	Malayalam		
2022	Virata Parvam	Telugu		
2022	Maamanithan	Tamil		
2022	Shabaash Mithu	Hindi		
2022	Ponniyin Selvan: I	Tamil	Nominated for Best Editing in the 16th Asian Film Awards	
2022	Goodbye	Hindi		
2023	Kuttey	Hindi		
2023	Gandhi Godse – Ek Yudh	Hindi		
2023	Ponniyin Selvan: II	Tamil		
2023	Paradise	English	Nominated for Best Editing in the 17th Asian Film Awards	
2023	Khufiya	Hindi		
2024	Ozhuki Ozhuki Ozhuki	Malayalam		
2024	The Goat Life	Malayalam		
2024	Indian 2	Tamil		
2024	Sector 36	Hindi		
2024	Kozhipannai Chelladurai	Tamil		
2024	Devara: Part 1	Telugu		
2025	Nesippaya	Tamil		
2025	Sky Force	Hindi		
2025	Deva	Hindi		
2025	Thug Life	Tamil		
2025	Madharaasi	Tamil		
2025	Mirai	Telugu		
2025	Bayaan	Hindi	Premiere at the 2025 Toronto International Film Festival	
2025	Telusu Kada	Telugu		
2025	Andhra King Taluka	Telugu		
2026	Mylanji	Tamil		
2026	Mrithyunjay	Telugu		
2026	Satluj	Hindi		
2026	Aadarsha Kutumbam H.No 47 - AK47 †	Telugu		
2026	Mayilaa †	Tamil	Premiere at IFFR	
2027	Inji Vellam †	Tamil	Filming	
TBA	Bermuda †	Malayalam	Filming	

Key
†	Denotes films that have not yet been released
