= Viji Thampi =

Indian film director

Kerala State President, Vishva Hindu Parishad
- Incumbent
- Assumed office 18 July 2021
- Preceded by: B. R. Balaraman

Personal details
- Spouse: Priya Varma
- Children: 2
- Relatives: Jagannatha Varma (Father-in-law)
- Occupation: Film director; Actor; Social activist

Viji Thampi is an Indian film director, actor, right-wing politician, and social activist who works in Malayalam films. Thampi is a member of Thiruvananthapuram regional board of the Central Board of Film Certification and the State Advisor of Kerala Kshetra Samrakshana Samithi. In 2021, Thampi was appointed as the Kerala State President of the Vishva Hindu Parishad. He was also a Jury member of National film awards declaration committee in 2022.

== Family ==
Viji Thampi's father, Sri R. Raghavan Thampi, was a member of the royal family of Karthikappally Palace. His mother, Smt. Indira Thampi, hailed from the Aristocractic Mankoikkal Kurup family of Southern Kerala. His maternal uncle, the late Adv. P. V. Neelakante Pillai, served as the President of the Nair Service Society (NSS) for nearly a decade. Viji Thampi is married to Priya Varma, the daughter of actor Jaganatha Varma.

== Career ==
After making his directorial debut with the 1988 film David David Mr. David, Thampi directed a series of comedy films in the 1990s which turned out to be commercial hits. Viji Thampi is known for appearing in cameo roles in his own films. He has also directed the Malayalam crime thriller television series Black and White and later, the mythological television serial Devimahathmyam.

== Filmography ==
=== Director ===
| Year | Film | Writer | Genre |
|---|---|---|---|
| 1988 | David David Mr. David | Kiran | Action Thriller |
| 1988 | Witness | Kaloor Dennis; John Paul | Thriller film |
| 1989 | New Year | Kaloor Dennis | Thriller |
| 1989 | Kaalal Pada | Ranjith | Action Thriller |
| 1990 | Nanma Niranjavan Srinivasan | Ranjith | Drama |
| 1990 | Nagarangalil Chennu Raparkam | Ranjith | Black comedy |
| 1990 | Marupuram | Kaloor Dennis; Ranjith | Action-thriller |
| 1992 | Pandu Pandoru Rajakumari | John Paul; Nedumudi Venu | Drama |
| 1992 | Kunukkitta Kozhi | Kaloor Dennis | Comedy |
| 1992 | Thiruthalvaadi | Kaloor Dennis | Comedy |
| 1992 | Soorya Manasam | Sab John | Drama |
| 1993 | Journalist | Kaloor Dennis | Drama |
| 1993 | Addeham Enna Iddeham | J. Pallassery | Comedy drama |
| 1993 | Janam | T. Damodaran | Political thriller |
| 1994 | Pidakkozhi Koovunna Noottandu | Sasidharan Arattuvazhi | Comedy drama |
| 1995 | Simhavalan Menon | Sasidharan Arattuvazhi | Comedy |
| 1995 | Avittam Thirunaal Aarogya Sriman | Sasidharan Arattuvazhi | Family comedy |
| 1996 | Kudumbakodathi | Sasidharan Arattuvazhi | Comedy |
| 1996 | Manthrikakuthira | Kaloor Dennis | Crime-thriller film |
| 1997 | Killikkurissiyile Kudumbamela | Kaloor Dennis | Family comedy |
| 2000 | Satyamev Jayate | Alex Kadavil | Action-thriller |
| 2001 | Naranathu Thampuran | Benny P. Nayarambalam | Comedy drama |
| 2005 | Krithyam | Kaloor Dennis | Thriller |
| 2006 | Bada Dosth | Babu Pallasery | Action-thriller |
| 2009 | Nammal Thammil | John Paul; Alex Kadavil | Campus thriller |
| 2009 | Chemistry | Vinu Kiriyath | Horror film |
| 2010 | April Fool | Jagadish | Comedy film |
| 2011 | Nadakame Ulakam | Sajan Cholayil | Comedy |
| 2013 | Nadodimannan | Krishna Poojappura | Action comedy |

=== Actor ===
1. INNOCENT (2025)
2. Vyasanasametham Bandhumithraadikal (2025)
3. MAYAMMA (2024)
4. Ennalum Sarath (2018) Dir.: Balachandra Menon
5. Njaan Samvidhanam Cheyyum (2016) Dir.: Balachandra Menon
6. Thanthonni (2010)... as Landlord (benaami)
7. Pachakuthira (2006)... Himself
8. Bada Dosth (2006)... Sekhara Pilla
9. Krithyam (2005)... Lawrence
10. Vakkalathu Narayanankutty (2001)... Chief Minister
11. Satyamev Jayate (2000)... Man at the bar
12. Samaantharangal (1998)... Mathew
13. Avittam Thirunaal Aarogya Sriman (1995)... Arumukham Thampi
14. Simhavalan Menon... Ikka
15. Pidakkozhi Koovunna Noottandu (1994)... Store room operator
16. Soorya Manasam (1992)... Landlord
17. Thiruthalvaadi (1992)... Avtar Singh
18. Nagarangalil Chennu Raparkam (1989)... Taxi driver
19. Pavam Pavam Rajakumaran (1990) as Bank Officer
20. Nagarathil Samsara Vishayam (1991)... Himself
21. Unnikale Oru Kadha Parayam (1987)... Police
22. Achuvettante Veedu (1987)... Taxi driver

== Television serials ==
=== Director ===
| Year | Title | Channel | Notes |
|---|---|---|---|
| 2000 | Black & White | Asianet | |
| 2004 | Annie | Kairali TV | Tele-cinema |
| 2005 | Amma | Amrita TV | Tele-cinema |
| 2007 | Mahatma Gandhi Colony | Asianet | |
| 2008 | Sree Krishna Leela | Asianet | |
| 2010–2012 | Devimahathmyam | Asianet | |
| 2019 | Ayyappa Saranam | Amrita TV | |
| 2023-2024 | Amme Bhagavathi | Flowers TV | |
| 2024 | Attukal Amma | Flowers TV | Sequel to Amme Bhagavathi |

=== As actor ===
- Mask
- Vamsam
- Mayamma (2024)

=== As judge ===
- Shreshtabharatam- Mahabharata (Amrita TV)
