= Oduvil Unnikrishnan =

Indian actor (1944–2006)

- Born: Oduvil Unnikrishnan Menon; 13 February 1943; Wadakkanchery, Kingdom of Cochin, British India
- Died: 27 May 2006 (aged 63); Kozhikode, Kerala, India
- Resting place: Wadakkanchery, Thrissur
- Occupations: Actor, singer, music director
- Years active: 1973–2006
- Spouse: Padmajam
- Children: Shalini; Padmini
- Parent(s): Wadakkanchery Enkakkatt Oduvil Veettil Krishna Menon; Parukkutty Amma

Oduvil Unnikrishnan (13 February 1943 – 27 May 2006) was an Indian actor who worked in Malayalam cinema. He portrayed supporting roles in both dramatic and comedic roles. He is a four-time winner of Kerala State Film Awards.

== Early life ==
Oduvil Unnikrishnan Menon was born on 13 February 1943 in Wadakkanchery, Thrissur, to Wadakkanchery Enkakkatt Oduvil Veettil Krishna Menon and Parukkutty Amma, as their youngest son. He had his primary education from Government Boys' High School, Wadakkanchery. His uncle, Sarasakavi Oduvil Kunhikrishna Menon, was a noted Malayalam writer.

Unnikrishnan was interested in music since his childhood, and learned vocal music and percussion instruments like mridangam and tabla. His trainer in vocal music was Kalamandalam Vasudeva Panikker. With his knowledge of music instruments, he joined some orchestra groups. He later joined renowned Malayalam theatres like K.P.A.C. and Kerala Kalavedi. His major job in those theatres was that of a tabla player. He also sang many songs and composed songs for many albums, like 'Parasuram Express' an album named after the train through the places where it goes. He performed many fill-in roles in plays as well. That was his first experience in acting.

== Film career ==
Oduvil Unnikrishnan debuted the film industry in the late 1970s with a role in Darshanam, directed by P. N. Menon. His second film was Chenda, directed by A. Vincent. His early notable roles were that of a mahout in Guruvayur Keshavan, directed by Bharathan and as Subbaiyer in Sarapanjaram, directed by Hariharan. He earned public recognition through character roles in films directed by Thoppil Bhasi, Hariharan and Sathyan Anthikkad. He has acted in more than 400 films. His memorable roles include those in Nizhalkuthu, Kathapurushan, Thooval Kottaram, Sargam, Yodha, Ponmuttayidunna Tharavu, Oru Cheru Punchiri, Aaram Thamburan and Manassinakkare. He could even make very brief roles like that of an idaykka player in Devasuram, directed by I. V. Sasi very memorable. He was regularly cast in films with Jayaram as the lead hero.

He composed music for an album named Parasuram Express (1984) to lyrics written by Bichu Thirumala and an unreleased film named Sarvam Saha directed by Ravi Gupthan. He won the Kerala State Film Award for Best Actor once and for Best Supporting Actor twice.

== Personal life ==
Unnikrishnan married Padmajam in 1975. They have two daughters, Padmini and Shalini.

Oduvil Unnikrishnan was suffering from kidney problems since 2000. He underwent dialysis at hospitals in Malappuram and Thrissur. Later, he was admitted to a private hospital in Kozhikode. He died there on 27 May 2006 at 6 am due to kidney failure. His body was taken to his birthplace at Wadakanchery, Thrissur and cremated at Ivarmadam, Pampady, nearby. Oduvil Mayatha Bhavangal written by E.Jayachandran is the biography of the actor published by Chintha Publishers.

== Awards ==
=== Kerala State Film Awards ===
Year	Award	Film	Director
1995	Second Best Actor	Kathapurushan	Adoor Gopalakrishnan
1996	Second Best Actor	Thooval Kottaram	Sathyan Anthikkad
2002	Best Actor	Nizhalkuthu	Adoor Gopalakrishnan

== Filmography ==
=== 1970s ===
Year	Title	Role	Notes
1973	Darsanam		
1973	Dharmayudham	Avarachan	
1973	Chenda	Mahout	
1974	Chakravakam	Mammad	
1977	Anugraham	School master Unnikrishnan	
1977	Agninakshathram		
1977	Guruvayur Kesavan		
1978	Adimakkachavadam	Appan/Kudukudu Kuttappan	
1978	Yagaswam		
1979	Sarapanjaram	Subbaiyer	
1979	Pushyaraagam		
1979	Mochanam	Vasu Pilla	

=== 1980s ===
Year	Title	Role	Notes
1980	Sakthi	Man at the Toddy Shop	
1980	Vaiki Vanna Vasantham	Gonsalvas	
1980	Lava	Panikkar	
1980	Muthuchippikal	Keshavan	
1980	Karimpana	Broker	
1981	Veliyattam	Mani	
1981	Valarthumrugangal	Govindan	
1981	Poocha Sanyasi		
1981	Dwandha Yudham	Lawyer	
1981	Sreeman Sreemathi		
1981	Randu Mukhangal		
1982	Anuraagakkodathi	Pachu Nair	
1983	Varanmaare Aavashyamundu	Karanavar	
1984	Sreekrishna Parunthu	Maarar	
1984	Appunni	Kurup Mash	
1985	Njan Piranna Nattil	Menon	
1985	Vellam	Moideen	
1985	Manakkale Thatha	Damodhara Kurup	
1985	Boeing Boeing	Ramankutty Shop Owner	
1985	Kandu Kandarinju	Boys Hostel Warden	
1987	P.C. 369	Adv. Swaminathan/Dr. Viswanathan/Prof. Kashinathan	
1987	Bhoomiyile Rajakkanmar	Adv. Balan	
1987	Kurukkan Rajavayi		
1987	Thaniyavarthanam	Raman Karthavu	
1988	Ponmuttayidunna Tharavu	Pappi	
1988	Pattanapravesham	Home Minister	
1988	Kudumbapuranam	Achuthan	
1988	Dhwani	Kurpu	
1988	Vicharana	Adv. Krishnamurthy	
1988	Oozham	Kunjan Nair	
1989	Varavelpu	Narayanan	
1989	Vadakkunokkiyantram	Policeman	
1989	Kalpana House	Fr. D'Souza	
1989	Kireedam	ASI Gopalakrishnan Nair	
1989	Nagarangalil Chennu Raparkam	Panicker	
1989	Ulsavapittennu	Paramu Nair	
1989	Season	Thirumeni	
1989	Pradeshika Varthakal	Fr. Antony Paramel	
1989	Peruvannapurathe Visheshangal	Appunni Nair	
1989	Mazhavilkavadi	Kunjappu	
1989	Oru Vadakkan Veeragatha	Naduvazhi	
1989	Artham	Ananthan	

=== 1990s ===
Year	Title	Role	Notes
1990	Thalayana Manthram	K. G. Poduval	
1990	Pavam Pavam Rajakumaran	Principal Kurup	
1990	Vidhyarambham	Kumaran Vaidyar	
1990	Sasneham	Srinivasa Iyer	
1990	Nagarangalil Chennu Raparkam	Panicker	
1990	Malayogom	'Kaliyugam' Paramu Nair	
1990	Kuruppinte Kanakku Pustakom	Gangadharan	
1990	Gajakesariyogam	Philipose	
1990	Kalikkalam	Devassy	
1990	Kuttettan	Nanu Nair	
1991	Sandesam	Achuthan Nair	
1991	Parallel College	Karunakaran	
1991	Ennum Nanmakal	Balan	
1991	Dhanam	Menon	
1991	Bharatham	Unnimama	
1991	Nettippattom	Avarachan	
1991	Mookilla Rajyathu	Dr. V. N. Sharma	
1991	Kankettu	Ananthan	
1991	Kadinjool Kalyanam	Pothuval	
1991	Innathe Program	Unni's Father	
1991	Cheppu Kilukkunna Changathi	Nishkalankan Pillai	
1991	Apoorvam Chilar	T. T. Punnoose	
1991	Aakasha Kottayile Sultan	Ramakrishna Iyer	
1991	Kanalkkattu	Ayyappan Nair	
1992	Snehasagaram	Vishnunarayan Nambuthiri	
1992	Sargam	Valiya Thampuran	
1992	Pandu Pandoru Rajakumari	Parameswara Kaimal	
1992	Oru Kochu Bhoomikulukkam	Dentist	
1992	Nakshthrakoodaram	Singapore Uncle	
1992	My Dear Muthachan	Factory Worker	
1992	Kaazhchakkppuram	Appukuttan Nair	
1992	Valayam	Govindan Ashan	
1992	Kamaladalam	Ravunni Nambeesan Aasan	
1992	Yoddha	Gopalan Menon	
1992	Chevalier Michael		
1992	Kallanum Polisum		
1992	Ellarum Chollanu	Ravunni Menon	
1992	Aayushkalam	Menon	
1993	Sthreedhanam		
1993	Sthalathe Pradhana Payyans	Poomukhathu Kurup	
1993	Devaasuram	Peringodu Sankara Marar	
1993	Bhaagyavaan	Vasudevan	
1993	Meleparambil Anveedu	Kuttan Nair	
1993	Oru Kadankatha Pole	Kaimal	
1993	Ente Sreekuttikku		
1993	Golanthara Vartha	Susheelan	
1993	Kalippattam	Ottappalam Chittappan	
1993	Bandhukkal Sathrukkal	Vasu Contractor	
1993	Patheyam	Keezhseri Nampoothiri	
1994	Vadhu Doctoranu	Marar	
1994	Varanamaalyam	Sankara Pilla	
1994	Sukrutham	Cheriyachan	
1994	Parinayam	Othikkan	
1994	Sagaram Sakshi	Narayanan	
1994	Vardhakya Puranam	Attakulangara Ambujakshan	
1994	Pingami	Menon	
1994	CID Unnikrishnan B.A., B.Ed.	Pappunni	
1994	Vishnu	Thampi	
1995	Thirumanassu	Thirumulpad	
1995	Sreeragam	Indu's Father	
1995	Sipayi Lahala	Radhika's Father	
1995	Sindoora Rekha	Raghavan Nair	
1995	No. 1 Snehatheeram Bangalore North	Shivaraman	
1995	Minnaminuginum Minnukettu	Pothuval	
1995	Keerthanam		
1995	Punnaram		
1995	Manikya Chempazhukka	Njanasheelan Gurukkal	
1995	Kusruthikaatu	Dr. K. Gopala Menon	
1995	Aniyan Bava Chetan Bava	Easwara Pillai	
1995	Oru Abhibhashakante Case Diary	Adv. Ramavarma Thampuran	
1996	Sathyabhamakkoru Premalekhanam	Warrier	
1996	Thooval Kottaram	Achuthan Marar	
1996	Sallapam	Madhava Menon	
1996	Kalyana Sougandhikam	Murukeshan Thattan	
1996	Dilliwala Rajakumaran	Rama Varma	
1996	Kathapurushan		
1996	Udyanapalakan		
1996	The Prince	Ram Mohan	
1996	Indraprastham	Manikkoth Kunjukrishna Panicker	
1997	Ullasapoongattu	Thirumeni	
1997	Oral Mathram	K. P. Pankunny Menon	
1997	Manthra Mothiram	Fr. Vattakuzhi	
1997	Kalyana Uniikal	Pushkaran Pillai	
1997	Aaraam Thampuran	Krishna Varma Thampuran	
1997	Kudamattam		
1997	Kaliyoonjal		
1997	Katha Nayakan	Sankunni Nair	
1998	Vismayam	Adhikari	
1998	Meenakshi Kalyanam	Adv. K. T. Easwara Pillai	
1998	Sreekrishnapurathe Nakshathrathilakkam	Munshi Parameshwara Pillai	
1998	Mattupetti Machan	Prabhakara Prabhu	
1998	Kusruthi Kuruppu	Meera's father	
1998	Kattathoru Penpoovu		
1998	Meenathil Thalikettu	Doctor	
1998	Manthrikumaran	Pothuval	
1999	Veendum Chila Veettukaryangal	Fr. Nedumaram	
1999	Prem Poojari	Bhairavan	
1999	Udayapuram Sulthan	College Principal	
1999	Pallavur Devanarayanan	Achuthan Marar	
1999	Njangal Santhushtaranu	Sanjeevan's Father	
1999	Deepasthambham Mahascharyam	Govinda Varma Raja	
1999	Chandamama	Bullet Achan	

=== 2000s ===
Year	Title	Role	Notes
2000	Varnakkazhchakal	Pothuval	
2000	Oru Cheru Punchiri	Krishna Kuruppu	
2000	Madhuranombarakattu	Head Master	
2000	Kochu Kochu Santhoshangal	Shekharan	
2000	Darling Darling	Warrier	
2000	Arayannangalude Veedu	Sreedharan	
2001	Randam Bhavam	Adv. Easwaran Potty	
2001	Nalacharitham Nalam Divasam		
2001	Rajapattam		
2001	Meghasandesam	Easwara Varma	
2001	Ee Parakkum Thalika	Sreedhara Kaimal	
2001	Narendran Makan Jayakanthan Vaka	'Naxalite' Vasu	
2001	Sundara Purushan	Suryanarayanan's Father	
2002	Malayali Mamanu Vanakkam	Narayana Kurup	
2002	Meesa Madhavan	Achuthan Namboothiri	
2002	Abharana Charthu		
2002	Nizhalkuthu	Kaliyappan the executioner	
2002	Yathrakarude Sradhakku	K. G. Nambiar	
2003	Choonda	Vasu	
2003	Thilakkam	Govinda Panikkar	
2003	Gramophone	Paattu Sett	
2003	Vellithira	Peppatty Nair	
2003	C.I.D. Moosa	Moolankuzhiyil Prabhakaran	
2003	Pattalam	Narayanan	
2003	Anyar		
2003	Manassinakkare	Sreedharan	
2003	Gowrisankaram		
2004	Maratha Nadu	Raman	
2004	Vamanapuram Bus Route	Appukuttan	
2004	Nerkku Nere		
2004	Runway	Krishnan Nair	
2004	Mayilattam	Kannan Mash	
2005	Achuvinte Amma	Abdullah	
2005	Choliyattam		
2005	December		
2005	Chandrolsavam		Cameo
2005	Kadha		
2006	Rasathanthram	Ganeshan Chettiyar	
2008	Magic Lamp	Achutha Menon	Posthumously
2009	Sanmanasullavan Appukuttan	Pisharadi Mashu	Posthumously
2009	Seetha Kalyanam	Nellayi Ramaswami	Posthumously
2009	Aayirathil Oruvan	Sreedharan	Posthumously

== As a composer ==
- Parasuram Express (1984 album): lyrics by Bichu Thirumala; singers K. P. Brahmanandan, K. S. Chitra, Krishnachandran, Lathika.
- Sarvam Saha (unreleased movie) directed by Ravi Gupthan.
- Malayalam Basic Devotional SREE PADAM {1984 ALBUM}: lyrics by Bharanikkavu sivakumar: singers P. Jayachandran, Dhanya, Sunanda

His Master's Voice LP RECORD SIDE 1 [S2XJT. 10651] SONGS:

- 1, VIGHNESHWARA SIVANANDANA
- 2, VRISCHIKA KRISHNASHTAMI
- 3, MANINAGANGALE
- 4, MOOKAMBIKE
- 5, ASHTAKSHARAMANTHRADHWANI

His Master's Voice LP RECORD SIDE 2 [S2XJT. 10652] SONGS:

- 1, GOKULASHTAMI
- 2, PAVIZHAMALARUKAL
- 3, OCHIRAVAZHUM
- 4, DEVIKANYAKUMARI
- 5, VADAKKANTHARAKAVILULSAVAM
