= Sathyameva Jayathe =

2000 film by Viji Thampi

- Directed by: Viji Thampi
- Screenplay by: Alex Kadavil
- Story by: Alex Kadavil
- Produced by: Evershine Pictures
- Starring: Suresh Gopi; Hemanth Ravan; Aishwarya; Siddique; Balachandramenon
- Cinematography: Sanjeev Shankar; Saloo George
- Edited by: A. Sreekar Prasad
- Music by: M. Jayachandran
- Release date: 2 September 2000
- Running time: 167 minutes
- Country: India
- Language: Malayalam

Sathyameva Jayathe (transl. Truth alone triumphs) is a 2000 Indian Malayalam-language action thriller film directed by Viji Thampi. This film's dialogue was written by G A Lal. The film stars Suresh Gopi, Aishwarya, Hemanth Ravan, Siddique, Rajan P Dev and Balachandramenon. The film had musical score by C. Rajamani and songs by M. Jayachandran.

== Plot ==
CI Chandrachoodan is a principled police officer whose refusal to compromise his values brings him into conflict with corrupt superiors. When Nancy Mullakkadan falls into the hands of underworld figures led by gangster Balu Bhai and his associate Musharuf Ibrahim, Chandrachoodan pursues the case despite official obstruction, determined to bring those responsible to justice.

== Cast ==
- Suresh Gopi as CI Chandrachoodan
- Hemanth Ravan as Musharuf Ibrahim / Bharath Shah
- Siddique as Balasubhramanyam (Balu Bhai)
- Balachandramenon as Basheer
- Aishwarya as Nancy Mullakkadan
- Mini Nair as Sharada, Basheer's wife
- Rajan P Dev as SSP Thomas Pattimattom IPS, Kochi City Police Commissioner
- Maniyanpilla Raju as SI George
- N. F. Varghese as Joseph Mullakkadan
- Cochin Haneefa as Adv. Isaac Varghese
- Salim Kumar as Mattancherry Mammad, a petty thief
- Devan as DCP Mathew Tharakan IPS, Mumbai Police
- Spadikam George as ADGP Mohandas IPS
- Sadiq as DYSP Ramavarma Thampan
- Baburaj as Sivaratnam
- Kunchan as Police Constable Satheeshan
- Nandu as Police Constable Kunjappan
- Krishna Kumar as Reji Mathew
- Jagannatha Varma MP Mathan Tharakan
- Kollam Thulasi as Viswambharan
- Bheeman Raghu as Sulaiman
- Rajendran as Sulaiman's henchman
- Reena as Nancy's mother
- James as Police Constable Babu
- Yamuna as George's wife
- Prof. Aliyar
- Sab John as Abul Kaif (Yeswanth)

== Soundtrack ==
The music was composed by M. Jayachandran.

No.	Song	Singers	Lyrics	Length (m:ss)
1	"Ampilippu Penninum"	Suresh Gopi	Gireesh Puthenchery	04:18
2	"Dhak Dhak Dil Dhad Ke"	Shankar Mahadevan	Gireesh Puthenchery	04:58
3	"Janmadharangale"	K. J. Yesudas	Gireesh Puthenchery	04:56
4	"Kalyanappattum Chuthi"	K. J. Yesudas	Gireesh Puthenchery	04:43
5	"Manassukalude Sangamam"	K. J. Yesudas	Gireesh Puthenchery	04:25
6	"Nathanin Gandharva"	K. J. Yesudas	Gireesh Puthenchery	05:04
7	"Poove Ponpoove"	K. J. Yesudas	Gireesh Puthenchery	04:59
8	"Poove Ponpoove"	Chithra	Gireesh Puthenchery	04:57
9	"Silu Silu"	Sujatha Mohan	Gireesh Puthenchery	04:05
