= Bada Dosth =

- DVD cover
- Directed by: Viji Thampi
- Written by: Babu Pallasery
- Produced by: Siddique
- Starring: Suresh Gopi; Siddique; Jyothirmayi; Manoj K. Jayan; Karthika
- Cinematography: Saloo George
- Edited by: V. Saajan
- Music by: M. Jayachandran
- Production company: Corporate Films
- Release date: 20 October 2006
- Running time: 132 minutes
- Country: India
- Language: Malayalam

Bada Dosth (transl. Big Friend) is a 2006 Indian Malayalam-language action thriller film directed by Viji Thampi and produced by Siddique. The film stars Suresh Gopi in the titular role alongside Siddique, Jyothirmayi and Manoj K. Jayan in lead roles. The film had a musical score by M. Jayachandran. The film was released on October 20 on the Eve of Diwali.

== Plot ==
This movie is the story about Daya Shankar (also called as Bada Dhosth), an efficient and daring IPS officer, famous for his gutsy actions against violence. His life takes an untoward turn when he come across a gangster Geevarghese a.k.a. G. V.

== Cast ==
- Suresh Gopi as Kochi City Police Commissioner Daya Shankar IPS / Bada Dosth
- Siddique as Geevarghese (GV), the main antagonist
- Manoj K. Jayan as Commissioner Sakeer Ali Muhammad IPS
- Cochin Haneefa as Javed Bhai
- Jyothirmayi as Meenakshi, Daya Shankar's wife
- Karthika Mathew as Journalist Nadira Hassan, Sakeer's girlfriend
- Meghna Naidu as Nanditha Menon
- Manikuttan as Nandu, Daya Shankar's brother
- Devan as Home Minister Kannoth Divakaran (K.D), the secondary antagonist
- Vijayakumar as Commissioner James Albert IPS
- Baburaj as Pakki Bhaskaran
- Riyaz Khan as CI Niranjan Das
- Rizabawa as Raveendranath Khurana
- P. Sreekumar as IG Vikramadithyan Pillai IPS
- Padmakumar as Gregory
- Salim Baba as Jagan
- Kiran Raj as Razal Bava

== Soundtrack ==
- "Kaadu Kuliranu" - M. Jayachandran, K. S. Chithra
- "Minnalkannum Minni (Title Song)" - Tippu, M. Jayachandran
