= David David Mr. David =

- Directed by: Viji Thampi
- Written by: K. S. Nath; Kiran (dialogues)
- Screenplay by: Kiran
- Produced by: Rajan; A. V. Govindankutty
- Starring: Balachandra Menon; Ashokan; Murali; Sumalatha
- Cinematography: Santhosh Sivan; Anandakkuttan
- Edited by: K. P. Hariharaputhran
- Music by: Raveendran
- Production company: Sukumaran R.
- Distributed by: Sukumaran R.
- Release date: 24 June 1988
- Country: India
- Language: Malayalam

David David Mr. David is a 1988 Indian Malayalam-language film, directed by Viji Thampi and produced by Rajan and A. V. Govindankutty. The film stars Balachandra Menon, Ashokan, Murali and Sumalatha in the lead roles. The film has musical score by Raveendran.

== Plot ==
The film opens with David being chased in the nighttime by goons and police alike. He runs into Sumalatha's house by chance and sees her trying to commit suicide by shooting herself. David grabs her gun and requests her a place to hide from the police. She obliges and he starts living there to be hidden from the police. Sumalatha lives in the house with Annie and her kid. Annie was separated from her lover Mohan after their marriage by Mohan's rich parents and she was saved by Sumalatha while contemplating suicide. She had been living there ever since. One day Shivasankaran and Jayan comes to Sumalatha's house in search of David who had phoned them from there. David opens after that about his past to Sumalatha when himself and Shivasankaran were porters in the railway station and Jayan was a driver. The 3 of them are thick friends trying to save money for Shivasankaran’ s blind mom's treatment and till Jayan can return to his hometown (from where he left in his teens when he was involved in torching a school as part of a strike).

David is an expert artist and draws portraits of tourists from the railway station. This is spotted by Singh, who hires him to help in produce counterfeit notes and hires his 2 friends in the operation as well. Once they find a corpse in the package Singh had given them to transport and backs out of his activities out of fear. They have been on the run ever since, hiding from Singh and his henchman who wants David back to complete his currency operation. David fears that Singh can land him in jail since he has got some photographs of David creating the counterfeit currency based on originals. David and Sumalatha eventually warm up to each other when him along with Annie succeed in getting some of her estates back which was illegally usurped by her husband's old manager Lonappan. For doing this they trick Lonappan’ s daughter Liza in to believing that David is a yoga master and gets some photos and audio involving both in compromising positions and blackmailing Lonappan with that. David revels to Sumalatha that he had a troubled childhood with his alcoholic father who drunk to his death and later being abandoned by his mother. He is hoping to see his mother someday to take revenge on her.

Sumalatha takes David to her tea estate where she tells him about her past. She was married to the old and wealthy businessman Das against her will by her brother. He pimps her out to his advantage and flourishing his business. He even made her abort her unborn child since he was only interested in selling her to his advantage. All this time David and Sumalatha are being watched by N. L. Balakrishnan who is hired by Singh to tail David and bring him back. Singhs people get hold of Shivasankaran from their hideout and kills him after he refuses to tell them where David is. They break Jayan's hand to try and get David out from hiding. Shivasankaran meets Jayan when he is back from the estate and breaks Singhs hands in retaliation. David also manages to find Mohan on their way back from the estate and reunites him with Annie. David eventually fins his mother with the help of Sumalatha and is shocked to learn that she was in a mental hospital all along, having lost her mental balance and living there till date. He also finds the photographer having his picture which Singh used to blackmail him and destroys the evidence. David decides to marry Sumalatha hoping that they can have a family life together with children. Sumalatha, upset on hearing this goes back to her estate. Annie reveals that she was operated by Das and made incapable of conceiving to avoid any further problems. David goes to meet her after knowing the truth but is captured on the way by N.L. Balakrishnan and taken to Singhs hideout. David manages to escape their captivity and reaches Sumalatha's estate, preventing her from committing suicide again. Singh reaches the same place and David eventually kills Singh after a fight. Sumalatha comes to visit David in the jail with his now normal mother and promises to wait for him.

== Cast ==
- Balachandra Menon as David
- Ashokan as David (Jayan)
- Murali as Mr. David (Shivashankaran)
- Sumalatha
- Karthika as Annie
- Thilakan as Lonappan
- Devan as Mohan
- Lissy as Liza Lonappan
- K. P. A. C. Azeez
- N. L. Balakrishnan
- Paravoor Bharathan as Das
- Thiagarajan as Singh
- Viji Thampi as Cameo Appearance
- Siddique as Cameo Appearance

== Soundtrack ==
The music was composed by Raveendran.

No.	Song	Singers	Lyrics	Length (m:ss)
1	"Eenavum Thaalavum"	K. S. Chithra	Bichu Thirumala	
2	"Ellaam Ore Manassaayi"	K. J. Yesudas	Bichu Thirumala	
3	"Konchikkonchi"	K. J. Yesudas, K. S. Chithra	Bichu Thirumala	
