= Kankettu =

1991 Indian film

- Directed by: Rajan Balakrishnan
- Written by: Sreenivasan
- Screenplay by: Sreenivasan
- Produced by: Saga Films
- Starring: Jayaram; Sreenivasan; Shobhana; Geetha Vijayan
- Cinematography: Vipin Mohan
- Music by: Johnson
- Release date: 1 May 1991
- Country: India
- Language: Malayalam

Kankettu (Blindfold) is a 1991 Indian Malayalam comedy film, directed by Rajan Balakrishnan. The film stars Jayaram, Sreenivasan, Shobhana and Geetha Vijayan in the lead roles. The film has musical score by Johnson.

== Cast ==
- Jayaram as Raju
- Sreenivasan as Magician Rangoonwala/Babu
- Shobhana as Sujatha
- Geetha Vijayan as Sridevi
- Oduvil Unnikrishnan as Ananthan
- Captain Raju as Peter Lal
- Philomina as Ananthan's mother
- Chitra as Shyama
- Mamukkoya as Keeleri Achu
- Lalu Alex as Jaffer
- Baiju
- K. P. A. C. Lalitha as Sujatha's mother
- Vineeth Anil as Shambu
- Krishnan Kutty Nair as Pothuval

== Synopsis ==
Magician Rangoonwala alias Babu stays in a rented house owned by Ananthan, who works as a security personnel in a private firm. Three months after hosting any shows, Rangoonwala gets a call for hosting a magic show in a nearby school on republic day. The only condition was that the show could house a trick in which a beautiful lady should portray the "Vanishing Beauty" event. After facing frequent requests from her Grandmother, Sridevi, the daughter of Ananthan agrees to take up the role. Despite getting good applause for all the tricks, the magic show ends on a sad note at the end as the vanishing beauty event fails, since Sridevi is not able to get out of the box.

Raju is chased by police in a pick-pocket case and he finds shelter in Babu's house. Once Babu identifies Raju to be a thief, he secretly informs police and police capture Raju from his house. After he is set free, Raju spots Babu on the way, and he chases him yelling that he would kill him. As Babu runs for his life, his neighbours get hold of Raju and beat him up very badly. Babu feels pity on Raju and he offers him shelter in his house. Raju is on the hunt for a job, and he attempted pick-pocket only to buy some food. On learning that Babu is a magician, Raju tells him that he will assist Babu in magic shows.

After proper rehearsal, they host the "Vanishing Beauty" event on stage with Sridevi again. This time Sridevi is able to escape from the box. However, on opening the box, they find another lady Sujatha in the box. The crowd throw stones and the four somehow escape. Sujatha reveals that she was followed by some people and in order to escape from them, she had entered the box unknowingly. Though Babu was angry with the happenings, Raju develops a soft corner for Sujatha, and suggests that she to stay in Sridevi's house as its late.

The next morning, they find that Sujatha is missing. Also two strangers come enquiring for her to which Raju responds in a harsh manner. Though Babu is worried about getting further bookings, to their surprise they get a new booking for the show. While the stage curtain is lifted, they see that there is no audience except one person, Jaffer. Jaffer tells them that Sujatha has fooled his brother who is in a mental asylum and so he wants her. On the basis of a heavy compensation assured, Babu and Raju promise that they will let him know once they trace Sujatha.

With the help of a local goon Keeleri Achu, they trace Sujatha and make way so that Jaffer and his men kidnap her. However, as they were not compensated for their task, they follow Jaffer and his men only to find out that Sujatha is taken to an underworld don Peter Lal. Peter Lal questions Sujatha and asks her about a set of documents, which Sujatha doesn't wish to reveal. Peter Lal then brutally tortures Sujatha. On seeing this, Raju, Babu and Keeleri Achu adventurously rescue Sujatha and take her to an isolated house.

Sujatha then reveals about the reason why Peter Lal is following her. She was working as a receptionist in a hospital, and was sharing a room with a journalist, Shyama. The hospital was run by Peter Lal. Shyama reveals that Peter Lal is an underworld don and he is illegally transplanting internal organs of patients in the hospital. Sujatha doesn't believe such facts about Peter Lal and believes him to be a good man living with humanity as he has set up a hospital. Shyama gets murdered by Peter Lal. A couple of days later, Sujatha receives a parcel that houses all evidence about Peter Lal, sent by Shyama. She then realises the illegal activities in the hospital. As Peter Lal becomes aware that Sujatha has discovered his activities, he follows her to get the documents.

== Soundtrack ==
The music was done by Johnson and the lyrics were by Kaithapram.

Song title	Singer(s)
"Gopeehridayam Nirayunnu"	K. J. Yesudas, Sujatha
"Nirakkudukka"	K. J. Yesudas, Krishnachandran

== Awards ==
- Kerala Film Critics Award for Best Female Playback Singer - Sujatha
