= Nagarangalil Chennu Raparkam =

- Poster designed by Gayathri Ashokan
- Directed by: Viji Thampi
- Written by: Ranjith
- Produced by: J. Peter
- Starring: Sreenivasan; Jayaram; Suparna Anand
- Cinematography: Anandakuttan; Santosh Sivan
- Edited by: K. P. Hariharaputhran
- Music by: Raveendran
- Production company: Pratheeksha Productions
- Distributed by: Pratheeksha Pictures
- Release date: 4 August 1989
- Running time: 163 minutes
- Country: India
- Language: Malayalam

Nagarangalil Chennu Raparkam (transl. Let's dwell in cities) is a 1989 Indian Malayalam-language comedy film directed by Viji Thampi and written by Ranjith. The film stars Sreenivasan and Jayaram and is partially based on Ruthless People (1986).

== Plot ==
Kunjoottan is a gullible man living in a countryside in Kerala, the only heir to wealthy aristocratic parents Thamburan and Kunjulakshmi. He cannot stand his overprotective father, who is concerned about his son's life after a nightmare he took as prophecy. After the family astrologer Panikker predicts that Kunjoottan would hardly survive age 30 and is prone to motor vehicles accidents, Thamburan hires two ex-mahouts Valiya Raman Nair and Cheriya Raman Nair to entourage Kunjoottan, which further annoys him.

Kunjoottan's childhood friend Ramachandran is back from town with exciting stories about city life. He is in urgent need of money to pay his debts from a failed business. He tricks Kunjoottan into stealing money from his father's vault so that they can run away and enjoy life in the city. By the time Kunjoottan discovers his friend's true intentions, he loses all his money to tricksters in the city. Ramachandran tries to get rid of Kunjoottan since his innocence was landing both in trouble.

Later, they kidnap a girl named Asha whose stepfather M.R.C had hired three men to kill her. After learning about her sad past, both Rama and Kunjoottan decide to help her instead. But Kunjoottan's father is hell-bent on finding his son. Asha's father hires a professional killer named Christopher Luke to kill Asha. After a series of comic mishaps, the killer is captured by police inspector Abu Hassan. Kunjoottan reunites with his father.

== Cast ==
- Sreenivasan as Kunjoottan
- Jayaram as Ramachandran, Kunjoottan's childhood friend
- Suparna Anand as Asha, Ramachandran's love interest
- Thilakan as M.R.C./Swamiji, Asha's stepfather
- Jagathy Sreekumar as SI Abu Hassan
- Janardhanan as Rambo Chackochan
- Suresh Gopi as Christopher Luke
- Balan K. Nair as Arumukham Chettiyar
- Nedumudi Venu as Aayilyamcheri Thampuran, Kunjoottan's father
- Innocent as Head Constable Ananthan, Ramachandran's brother-in-law
- Sukumari as Kunjulakshmi, Kunjoottan's mother
- Kuthiravattam Pappu as 'Valiya' Raman Nair
- Mamukkoya as 'Cheriya' Raman Nair
- Oduvil Unnikrishnan as Panicker
- Siddique as Rambo's assistant
- Vijayaraghavan as Rambo's assistant
- Santhosh as Rambo's assistant
- Kunchan as Uncle Sam
- Valsala Menon as Martha Aunty, Uncle Sam's wife
- M. S. Thripunithura as Kunjoottan's Uncle
- Kanakalatha as Girija, Ramachandran's sister
- Kollam G. K. Pillai as Karyasthan
- Kothuku Nanappan as stamp paper seller
- Kollam Ajith as Chettiyar's henchman
- James as Chettiyar's henchman
- Ragini as Stella, MRC's mistress
- Kalabhavan Rahman as Njondi Kunjappu
- Adinad Sasi as police constable
- Viji Thampi as thief (cameo appearance)
