= Kusruthi Kuruppu =

1998 Indian film

- VCD cover
- Directed by: Venugopan
- Written by: Rafi Mecartin
- Produced by: Thommikunju Neendur
- Starring: Jayaram; Meena; Oduvil Unnikrishnan; Jagathy Sreekumar; Innocent; KPAC Lalitha
- Cinematography: Venugopal Madathil
- Edited by: K. Sankunni
- Music by: Johnson
- Production company: Suraj Productions
- Distributed by: Maruti Release
- Release date: 13 March 1998
- Country: India
- Language: Malayalam

Kusruthi Kuruppu (transl. Mischievous Kurup) is a 1998 Indian Malayalam-language comedy-drama film directed by Venugopan and written by Rafi Mecartin. The film stars Jayaram, Meena, Jagathy Sreekumar, Innocent and KPAC Lalitha in the lead roles. The film has musical score by Johnson. The film was a box office success.

== Plot ==
Narendran is a well to do businessman. His parents are no more, but his father's three friends act as his extended family and advisors. He spends his evenings drinking with them and they act a support structure for him. His business is successful. But every once in a while, Narendran takes off without telling anyone and tries to live a simple life without anyone knowing about his financial status. Once on one such trip, he ends up in a village and rents a place owned by a local family. The couple who own the house have four children. The eldest, is married to a woman from a different faith. Narendran likes their family, the food and the overall simplicity of their lives. He eventually falls in love with the eldest daughter of the family, Meera. They get married with the blessings of her family and his father's friends. After the wedding he invites his in-laws to stay with him for a while. Thereafter, the movie takes a turn when her relatives start interfering in his business, with disastrous results. The rest of the movie shows how the hero handles the situation, and deals with his enemies too, who try to take advantage of the situation, as well as his wife and her relatives.

== Cast ==
- Jayaram as Narendran
- Meena as Meera (dubbed by Ambili Prayag)
- Oduvil Unnikrishnan Meera's father
- KPAC Lalitha Meera's Mother
- Jagathy Sreekumar as Bhaskaran, Meera's brother
- Sudheesh as Gopu, Meera's brother
- Bindu Panicker as Noor Jahaan, Bhaskaran's wife
- Innocent
- Sankaradi as Captain
- Paravoor Bharathan as Mathayi
- T. P. Madhavan as Narendran's secretary
- Indrans as Suppan
- Spadikam George as Prabhakaran
- Philomina as Bhaskaran's mother in law
- Srividya as Dr Shyamala

== Soundtrack ==
The music was composed by Johnson and the lyrics were written by Gireesh Puthenchery.

No.	Song	Singers	Lyrics	Length (m:ss)
1	"Maanathe Maamayile"	K. J. Yesudas	Gireesh Puthenchery	
2	"Melleyen Kannile" (D)	K. J. Yesudas, K. S. Chithra	Gireesh Puthenchery	
3	"Melleyen Kannile" (F)	K. S. Chithra	Gireesh Puthenchery	
4	"Peelimukil Thaazhvarayil"	M. G. Sreekumar	Gireesh Puthenchery	
5	"Thaarmakalkkanpulla"	K. J. Yesudas	Gireesh Puthenchery	
