= Janam (1993 film) =

- Directed by: Viji Thampi
- Written by: C. K. Jeevan
- Screenplay by: T. Damodaran
- Produced by: Mani C. Kappan
- Starring: Murali; Geetha; Siddique; Jagadish
- Cinematography: Sanjeev Shankar
- Edited by: A. Sreekar Prasad
- Music by: S. P. Venkitesh
- Production company: O.K.Productions
- Distributed by: O.K.Pictures
- Release date: 1993
- Country: India
- Language: Malayalam

Janam (transl. The People) is a 1993 Indian Malayalam-language film directed by Viji Thampi and starring Murali, Siddique and Geetha in the lead roles.

== Plot ==
Balachandran, who follows in his father's footsteps to become a politician with the aim of helping people. However, his journey takes a dark turn when he is framed for a crime by corrupt politicians and sent to jail. Determined to clear his name and seek justice, Balachandran decides to take revenge on those who wronged him.

== Cast ==
- Murali as Balachandran / Balan
- Siddique as Sivan, Balan's friend
- Geetha as Susheela, Sivan's sister and Balan's ex-lover
- Jagadish as Adv. Harikrishnan / Hari, Sivan and Balan's friend
- Thilakan as DGP Thomas Mathew IPS
- Sukumaran as Opposition Leader Luckose
- Rajan P. Dev as Dasappan
- Rekha as Revenue Minister Gomathiyamma
- Jagathy Sreekumar as Vazhuthala Sasi
- Janardhanan as Chief Minister K. Divakaran
- K. B. Ganesh Kumar as Mahesh
- K. P. A. C. Lalitha as Devakiyamma, Balan's mother
- Jose Pellissery as Ex- Chief Minister Nair
- Karamana Janardanan Nair as Ananthan
- Narendra Prasad as Azheekkal Raghavan, Balan's father
- Mamukkoya as Janab Koyakkutty Sahib
- K. P. A. C. Azeez as I.G Madhavan Nair
- Kollam Thulasi as Mathachan
- Jagannatha Varma as City Police Commissioner Fernandus
- Indrans as Sasi's Assistant
- Bheeman Raghu as Firoz, Dasappan's henchman
- Kamal Gaur as Khalid Settu, Luckose and Dasappan's business partner
- Seetha as Sreedevi, Sivan's wife
- Malavika as Reshma, Dasappan's daughter and Hari's love interest
- Manakkadu Ravi as Latheef
- Kaladi Omana as Lakshmiyamma
- Manu Varma as Ramesh Venu, Dasappan's Son and Reshma's brother
- James as Shaji
- Cuckoo Parameswaran as Anjana
- Aliyar as party Leader
