= Nammal Thammil =

- Movie poster
- Directed by: Viji Thampi
- Written by: Alex Kadavil & John Paul (Screenplay)
- Produced by: Evershine Pictures
- Starring: Prithviraj; Indrajith; Geetu Mohandas
- Cinematography: Sanjeev Shankar
- Edited by: A. Sreekar Prasad
- Music by: M. Jayachandran
- Release date: 27 March 2009
- Country: India
- Language: Malayalam

Nammal Thammil (transl. Between us) is a 2009 Malayalam language action drama film directed by Viji Thampi, starring Prithviraj, Indrajith and Geetu Mohandas in her penultimate acting credit. the film was completed on 13 February 2004, but got released on 27 March 2009.

== Plot ==
The story starts in an Engineering College where Vigneshwar alias Vicky wins an election and becomes the Union Chairman of the college. Vicky's love interest is Anu, who loves and believes him a lot more than anyone else. After the celebrations of winning the election, Vicky and team set for a fight against police battalion but are stopped by the College Principal Adiyodi Meppadu. Everyone likes Vicky and is impressed by him for every angle. One day Vicky makes a bet with Meera, a fellow student that if their team wins a basketball match they will cut off Meera's hair. And she agrees to that.

Once, their college win the match only because of Vicky and all start celebrating with songs and dances. Everything goes well and Vicky's and Anu's relation becomes more serious until Roy, who madly loves Anu, learns of their relationship. Anu asks Vicky to promise not to cut Meera's hair for her sake. Vicky conditionally promises her not to do so. When Roy learns of this, his friends cut off Meera's hair and she believed that it was Vicky. The principal suspends Vicky for five days. Even Anu starts to dislike Vicky for cheating her. Even though Vicky tries to console her that it was not him who had done the wrong, she impatiently starts to move away from him. On reaching home Vicky's father Ramachandran too scolds him for his plight. But his mother Lekshmi soothes him and compels him to apologize Meera. He does so and eagerly waits for Anu in the canteen only to find that Anu now hates him a bit.

Then Johny Rose from Delhi joins the college. Anu studied with him at Delhi years ago. To make Vicky more provoked and uneasy Anu starts loving Johny. Roy also learns of this and decides to create a rift between Vicky and Johny to win Anu's heart. Later all the college members plan to conduct a programme. Anu reveals that Johny will be her pair for their dance programme. Roy spoils the programme by locking Jonhy inside the Green Room who saw Vicky standing near the door. Vicky actually came to open the door but Johny believed that it was Vicky who locked him. This led to a long fight. Johny blames Vicky for this. The next day Ramachandran and Rosy Alex, Johny's mother are called to the college to solve the problem. Vicky admits that he did not do the crime. But still no one believes him. This leads to silly tensions between Ramachandran and Vicky. Even his close friends go against him. Roy and his friends plan more ways to increase the fight between Vicky and Johny.

Lakshmi goes to Johny's house to see Rosy in his absence. To her shock Lakshmi learns that Vicky and Johny are brothers as Ramachandran is Johny's father too. Later Vicky enters a practical class and pesters Anu due to his overwhelming love for her. Johny interferes and again they begin to fight. This made Anu completely hate Vicky. Then he picturises in his mind the love and romance of Johny and Anu. Later Kuriachan, Anu's father, threatens Vicky not to disturb her again but promises him to give him Anu if she agrees. The next day, he sees full of cartoon posters based to Johny, Anu and himself which provoked him more. In a fit of anger, he goes to Johny's class and threatens him badly that again if he shines in the college, he will burn him alive. This makes Roy easier and he burns Johny's bike for which police arrest Vicky. This time Rosy release him as per the request of Lakshmi and feeling that Vicky, as Johny' brother is considerably her son too.

That night, Kuriachan consoles Anu about how he married his wife and the true symbols of love and relationships. Feeling guilty, Anu cries thinking that she made Vicky painful. Later, Roy's friends throw stone on Johny's house which injured Rosy. Angered, Johny goes to Vicky's house to find that he was not there. He threatened Vicky's parents for his cruelty. As Johny goes, Vicky comes to the house and Ramachandran orders him to leave the house. The next morning, Ramachandran is hit by a car which was driven by Roy. He puts the plate of Rosy's name on the spot. When Vicky saw this he believed that it was Johny who tried to kill his father. On reaching hospital he get heartbroken and then moves to the college to face Johny. Then Rosy comes to the hospital and plan with Lakshmi to reveal the truth that Johny and Vicky are brothers in order to make them ease out of their anger. Anu hears this and goes to the college where Roy's friends lies to her that he is in Roy's building site. On reaching there Anu learns that it was Roy behind the fight that happened between Vicky and Johny. Vicky and Johny fight hard to kill each other. Roy dies on falling from the building and Anu rushes to the college. She reveals the truth to them and apologizes each other.

In the end, Vicky and Anu unite and Johny is happy on seeing that.

== Cast ==
- Prithviraj as Vigneshwar Ramachandran (Vicky)
- Indrajith as Johnny Rose
- Geetu Mohandas as Anu Kurian
- Jagathy Sreekumar as Principal Adiyoodi Meppaadu
- Balachandra Menon as Ramachandran IAS, Vicky and Johnny's father
- Siddique as Kuriachan, Anu's father
- Revathi as Lekshmi, Vicky's mother
- Suhasini Maniratnam as Rosy IAS, Johnny's mother
- Remya Nambeesan as Uma, Vicky's sister
- Prasanth Alexander as Prasanth, Vicky's friend
- Mithun Ramesh as Mithun, Vicky's friend
- Saji Surendran as Anoop, Vicky's friend
- Jijoy Rajagopal as Roy Paul
- Vinayakan as Tony, Roy's friend
- Anjali Nair as College Student
- Shanawas as George Isaac, Lecturer

== Production ==
The film was announced in 2002 under the title Fifty Fifty.

== Soundtrack ==
The film's soundtrack contains seven songs, all composed by M. Jayachandran, with lyrics by Gireesh Puthenchery. The song "Junile Nilaamazhayil", which is set in Darbari Kanada, became popular.

#	Title	Singer(s)
1	"Junile Nilaamazhayil"	K. J. Yesudas, Sujatha Mohan
2	"Junile Nilaamazhayil"	Sujatha Mohan
3	"Kabadi Kabadi"	Afsal, Rimi Tomy
4	"Pottu Thottu"	Madhu Balakrishnan
5	"Priyane Urangiyille"	Sujatha Mohan
6	"Siyonaa Sithaarin"	Ranjini Jose, Vidhu Prathap
7	"Uyire Urangiyille"	K. J. Yesudas
