= New Year (1989 film) =

- Directed by: Viji Thampi
- Written by: Kaloor Dennis
- Produced by: SST Subramaniyam
- Starring: Jayaram; Suresh Gopi; Urvasi; Babu Antony; Silk Smitha; Sukumaran
- Cinematography: Santhosh Sivan
- Music by: Shyam
- Production company: Evershine Productions
- Release date: 24 January 1989
- Country: India
- Language: Malayalam

New Year is a 1989 Indian Malayalam-language crime thriller film directed by Viji Thampi. It is a remake of the 1985 Hindi film Aitbaar, which in turn was based on Dial M for Murder. The film stars Jayaram, Suresh Gopi, Urvashi, Silk Smitha and Sukumaran.

== Plot ==
The film begins with Menon traveling in a taxi. The car engine overheats and the driver gets out of the car to investigate. Menon gets out of the car and is murdered by the driver.

In the flashback, it is shown that Ajith is Menon's nephew who is in love with Menon's daughter, Rekha. Ajith gets a job in the military which Menon disallows. He takes the job despite the disapproval and leaves town. A new suitor named Vinod appears and soon becomes Menon's favourite. Menon arranges the marriage of Rekha to Vinod, despite her disapproval. Vinod is a selfish criminal who wants to take Menon's property. He has a girlfriend named Daisy who is a dancer.

Later, it is revealed that Vinod was the one who hired Robert to kill Menon when he learns of his deeds. Ajith is transferred to Ooty and visits Rekha. Seeing her predicament, he feels pity. After he leaves, he writes a letter to Rekha saying that he still loves her. Rekha hides the letter from Vinod but Vinod finds it causing him to start doubting Rekha. Vinod and Rekha go shopping and Rekha misplaces her handbag. Knowing that the handbag contains Ajith's letter, Rekha rushes to retrieve it and finds another letter asking for 50000 Rs in return for the letter. Rekha leaves the money in a lift as told in the letter, but does not get her letter back. After this incident, Vinod confirms Rekha's affair. He hires Robert again to kill Rekha by showing him the pictures taken when he killed Menon. Robert enters the house on New Year's Eve when Ajith and Vinod go to a party. Robert attacks Rehka and she kills him with a pair of scissors. Rehka is found guilty of murder, for which she is sentenced to 14 years in prison. Upon reflection, the Circle Inspector Stephen doubts Vinod's story and raids the house. He finds the photographs and shows them to Rekha and Ajith. When Vinod discovers that he is caught, he kills himself.

== Cast ==
- Jayaram as Ajith Kumar, Rekha's lover
- Suresh Gopi as Vinod Menon, Rekha's Husband The main antagonist
- Urvashi as Rekha, Vinod's wife
- Sukumaran as Circle Inspector Stephen George
- Siddique as Sub Inspector John Alexander
- Babu Antony as Robert
- Thilakan as Adv. Mathew Philip
- Prathapachandran as Menon, Rekha's Father
- Innocent as Pappan
- Silk Smitha as Daisy
- Valsala Menon as Ajith's mother
- Kunchan as Chandran, Police Constable
- James as Babu, Police Constable
- Ravi Menon as Advocate Ganeshan
- Viji Thampi as cameo appearance
