= Pandu Pandoru Rajakumari =

- Directed by: Viji Thampi
- Written by: John Paul; Nedumudi Venu
- Produced by: M. Mani
- Starring: Jagadish; Anju; Nedumudi Venu; Siddique
- Cinematography: Vipin Mohan
- Edited by: V. P. Krishnan
- Music by: Shyam
- Release date: 1992
- Country: India
- Language: Malayalam

Pandu Pandoru Rajakumari is a 1992 Malayalam film directed by Viji Thampi, with Jagadish, Anju, Siddique and Nedumudi Venu.

== Plot ==
Traumatized by deaths of her mother and husband, Devu was taken by her father-in-law Balan Nambiar. They went to a hotel in Ooty. One day, Appukuttan Pillai got job as waiter, witnessed an accident and Devu was mentally disturbed. Appu was actually a music student of her late mother, who knew her for years. Balan asked him to take care of Devu; soon Appu starts having feelings of childhood love, despite her being a widow.

== Cast ==
- Jagadish as Appukuttan Pillai
- Nedumudi Venu as Balan Nambiar
- Anju as Devu
- Siddique as Johnson
- Sivaranjini as Alice
- Zainuddin as Velu
- Premkumar as Pushpan
- Kunchan as Suku
- Oduvil Unnikrishnan as Parameswara Kaimal
- Manoj K. Jayan as Vishnu
- Narendra Prasad as Dr. Robert Franklin D'Souza
- Shanthi Krishna as Devayani
- Thodupuzha Vasanthi as Ammini
- Jagannatha Varma as Thampuran
- Kollam Thulasi as Arumugham Vadivelan
