= Soorya Manasam =

- Promotional poster
- Directed by: Viji Thampi
- Written by: Sab John
- Produced by: P. Nandakumar
- Starring: Mammootty; Sowcar Janaki; Raghuvaran; Vinodini
- Cinematography: Jayanan Vincent; Santosh Sivan
- Edited by: Sreekar Prasad
- Music by: Songs: M. M. Keeravani; Background Score: S. P. Venkatesh
- Release date: 2 April 1992
- Running time: 113 minutes
- Country: India
- Language: Malayalam

Soorya Manasam is a 1992 Indian Malayalam-language drama film directed by Viji Thampi and written by Sab John. The film stars Mammootty, along with Raghuvaran, Vinodini, Sowcar Janaki, Vaishnavi, Riza Bava and Jagathy Sreekumar playing supporting roles. The film revolves around Putturumees, a mentally disabled man and his mother Mariya who face several social issues in their village.

== Plot ==
Soorya Manasam is a 1992 Indian Malayalam-language drama film directed by Viji Thampi, loosely based on the American novel Of Mice and Men by John Steinbeck. The story centers on the tragic life of a mentally challenged man and his deep bond with his mother.

The story follows Putturumees (Mammootty), a physically imposing man with the intellectual capacity of a young child. Due to his social awkwardness and immense physical strength—which he often cannot control—he is misunderstood, feared, and ridiculed by the villagers.

He lives with his elderly mother, Mariya (Sowcar Janaki), who is his sole protector and the only person who truly understands his innocent nature. Mariya works hard as a domestic helper to provide for them, constantly shielding Umees from the cruelty of the world.

== Cast ==
- Mammootty as Putturumees
- Raghuvaran as Shivan, the main antagonist (voiceover by Shammi Thilakan)
- Sowcar Janaki as Mariya, Urumees's mother
  - Vaishnavi as young Mariya
- Vinodini as Mooppan's daughter
- Anugraha as Subhadra
- Riza Bava as Stephan, Tea Estate Owner
- Ashokan as James
- Siddique as Philip, Urumees's father
- Jagathy Sreekumar as Mooppan
- Jagannathan as Madhavan, Tea shop owner
- Jagannatha Varma as Fr. Joseph Varkey
- T. P. Madhavan as Fr. Jacob Kurian
- Augustine as Govindan, Shivan's henchman
- James as Muthu
- Shivaji as Inspector Unnikrishnan
- Viji Thampi as landlord
- Biyon

== Music ==
The music for the film was composed by M. M. Keeravani and the lyrics were written by Kaithapram Damodaran Namboothiri. The background music was composed by S. P. Venkatesh.

Song list

- "Tharalitha Ravil Mayangiyo Sooryamanasam": K. J. Yesudas
- "Kannil Nila": Mano
- "Meghatherirangum Sanchari": K. S. Chithra
- "Tharalitha Ravil Mayangiyo Sooryamanasam": K. S. Chithra

== Reception ==
Malini Mannath of The Indian Express wrote, "There is no wrong step in the characterisation of the simpleton. Tight screenplay and slick editing enhance the narrative value."

== Awards ==
- 1993 Kerala Film Critics Award for Best Actor – Mammootty
