= Witness (1988 film) =

- Poster
- Directed by: Viji Thampi
- Screenplay by: John Paul; Kaloor Dennis
- Story by: Jagathy Sreekumar; Viji Thampi
- Starring: Jayaram; Jagathy Sreekumar; Madhu; Sukumaran; Thilakan; Suresh Gopi; Parvathy
- Cinematography: Vasant Kumar
- Edited by: K. P. Hariharaputhran
- Music by: Songs: Ouseppachan; Score: Johnson
- Production company: Priyanka Films
- Distributed by: Priyanka Films
- Release date: 20 February 1988
- Country: India
- Language: Malayalam

Witness is a 1988 Indian Malayalam language crime thriller film, directed by Viji Thampi and co-written by Jagathy Sreekumar, starring Jayaram, Jagathy Sreekumar, Parvathy, Madhu, Sukumaran and Thilakan in the lead roles.

== Plot ==
Balagopalan arrives in Thiruvananthapuram with 12500 rupees stolen from his father. He finds his friend Jayakumar, who is working as a junior artist in films. After losing the money, they start a food stall. Rivalry with another stall leads to skirmishes, and they land at the police station, where they meet with advocate Madhavan.

Under the guidance of Madhavan Thampi, the friends started a delivery service called "We Help." Balu meets Indu R. Nair, a wealthy girl whose parents are deceased. Indu's uncle, Rajagopalan Nair, looks after the properties left to her by her parents. When Indu turns major, she tells her uncle she will look into all the expenses her uncle wants to make. Rajagopalan Nair doesn't like this. Indu asks Balagopalan to be her bodyguard. But when Jayakumar and Balagopalan visit her home, they discover that Indu has been murdered. Police Officer Thomas Mathew takes charge of the case. Madhavan tries to find her killer to save Balagopalan and Jayakumar before it is too late.

Police officer Thomas Mathew initially arrests Balu and Kumar based on circumstantial evidence since they were found at Indu's House after her murder. However, Madhavan Thampi bails them out while further investigation proceeds. Thomas Mathew suspects Indu's Uncle Rajagopalan Nair to be the culprit since he was Indu's guardian and caretaker of her properties and heir to her properties if something were to happen to her. He also questions Alex Williams, Indu's college mate, who had a history of harassing her. Meanwhile, Balu and Kumar try to find some evidence to find the real murderer. They break into Indu's flat and find a sketch made by her, probably of her murderers. Madhavan Thampi takes the sketch to Thomas Mathew, who runs it against the list of available habitual criminals. They find the picture matching Hamsa and his accomplice, both of whom are professional killers imprisoned currently under another case. Since they were already arrested at the time of the crime, Thomas Mathew dismisses the sketch as a false lead and decides to arrest Balu and Kumar. Meanwhile, Madhavan Thampi investigates on his own to find the real murderers.

Finally, during the case's hearing, he divulges that the actual killer is not Jayakumar or Balagopalan. Madhavan Thampi proves this with the help of the apartment watchman, who saw the killer, and the bartender, who overheard the killer talking to someone who had some evidence against him. The killer finally confesses at the court, and Balu and Kumar are acquitted.

== Cast ==
- Jayaram as Balagopalan / Balu
- Jagathy Sreekumar as Jayakumar / Kumar, Balu's Friend
- Madhu as Adv. Madhavan Thampi
- Sukumaran as CI Thomas Mathew
- Thilakan as SI Vikraman Nair
- Parvathy as Indu R. Nair, Balu's Lover
- Innocent as Sankunni Nair
- Jayabharathi as Dr. Sreedevi
- Suresh Gopi as Alex Williams
- Siddique as CI Alexander
- Vijayaraghavan as Hamsa
- Alex Mathew as Henry
- K. P. A. C. Azeez as Rajagopalan Nair, Indu's Uncle
- Jagadish as Podiyan (Cameo)
- Nedumudi Venu as Himself (Cameo)
- Thikkurissy Sukumaran Nair as Old Man (Cameo)
- Poojappura Ravi as College Professor
- James as Watchman
- Kalabhavan Rahman as L. Murali Raghavan, Newspaper Boy
- Rajan Sankaradi as Goonda

== Soundtrack ==
The film score was composed by Johnson while the songs were composed by Ouseppachan with lyrics written by Bichu Thirumala.

| No. | Song | Singers | Lyrics | Length (m:ss) |
|---|---|---|---|---|
| 1 | "Poovinum Poonkurunnaam" | K. J. Yesudas, K. S. Chithra | Bichu Thirumala | |
| 2 | "Thumbamellaam" | K. J. Yesudas | Bichu Thirumala | |

== Box office ==
The film was declared a hit at the box office.

== Remake ==
The film was remade in Telugu as Sakshi with Rajendra Prasad.
