= Krithyam =

- DVD Cover
- Directed by: Viji Thampi
- Written by: Kaloor Dennis
- Story by: Robin Thirumala; Ansar Kalabhavan
- Produced by: Sasi Ayyanchira
- Starring: Prithviraj Sukumaran; Parul Yadav; Eva Pavithran; Jagathy Sreekumar
- Cinematography: Shamdat Sainudeen
- Edited by: A. Sreekar Prasad
- Music by: Udayakumar; M. Jayachandran (background)
- Production company: Sree Uthrattathi Films (PVT) Ltd
- Distributed by: Sree Uthrattathi Films (PVT) Ltd
- Release date: 6 May 2005
- Country: India
- Language: Malayalam

Krithyam (English: Mission) is a 2005 Indian Malayalam-language film directed by Viji Thampi and starring Prithviraj Sukumaran in dual role as both the hero and villain.

== Plot ==
Sandra Punnoose discovers that she only has six months to live. She hires a professional killer, Christy Lopez to end her life, posing as her caretaker Solomon. Christy tries to kill her, but Sandra escapes and her driver gets shot.

The case is handled by police officer Surya Narayanan. On questioning Sandra, he learns about Christy and tries to catch him. One day, Sandra meets Sathya who saves her from a robbery in a shopping mall. Sandra mistakes him to be Christy and hands him over to the police. The police try to make him admit the truth, but he doesn't say a word. Later his friend Badsha and his guardian, a priest come to bail him out and reveal that Sathya is a boy with speech impairment, who is an orphan brought up by the father. Sandra feels sorry for Sathya and to make up for her mistake, befriends him. Sathya who is already smitten by Sandra is as happy as he can be. Soon their friendship changes into love.

Meanwhile, Christy repeatedly attempts to kill Sandra, but always fails. His failures make Christy obsessed with killing her.

Later, Sandra learns from her friend Lavanya's brother Ramdas Menon, a doctor in the US, that her condition is curable. She prepares to leave for the US for treatment. Once back, she confesses her love to Sathya and both decide to get married. On the day of the marriage, however, Christy drugs Sathya and takes his place as the groom. He, on the pretext of driving to church, leaves with Sandra in the car. Meanwhile, Sathya regains consciousness and tries to call Sandra from the landline. Sandra receives the call and when receiving only some sounds (like the ones dumb people make) realizes that it is Sathya on the line and that it is Christy who is with her in the car. She pretends to be talking to her friend and tricks Christy into disclosing where he is taking her. He takes her to a nearby island, where he is going to kill her. Sandra reveals that she gave the quotation, but that doesn't stop Christy from wanting to kill her. Sathya arrives there and a fight ensures between them. Christy beats Sathya very badly and is about to kill him when Surya Narayanan arrives and shoots Christy, who falls into the sea. The movie ends with the couple leaving along with the police and Christy, who is not dead, resurfacing from the water.

== Cast ==
- Prithviraj Sukumaran in a dual role as:
  - Sathya (Protagonist)
  - Christy Lopez (Antagonist)
- Parul Yadav as Sandra Punnoose
- Indrajith Sukumaran as Dr.Ramdas Menon
- Eva Pavithran as Lavanya
- Shruthy Menon as Julia
- Siddique as ACP Surya Narayanan IPS
- Jagathy Sreekumar as Solomon Joseph
- Kalpana as Victoria
- Salim Kumar as Badsha
- Tony as Jacob Punnoose
- P. Sreekumar as Joseph Punnoose
- Viji Thampi as Lawrence
