= Simhavalan Menon =

- Directed by: Viji Thampi
- Written by: Sasidharan Arattuvazhi
- Produced by: Kilimanoor Chandran
- Starring: Madhu; Siddique; Jagadish; Jagathy Sreekumar; Urvashi
- Cinematography: Vipin Mohan
- Edited by: A. Sreekar Prasad
- Music by: S. P. Venkatesh
- Production company: Sree Bhuvaneswari Movie Arts
- Distributed by: Pratheeksha Pictures
- Release date: 1 February 1995
- Country: India
- Language: Malayalam

Simhavalan Menon (transl. Lion-tailed Menon) is a 1995 Indian Malayalam-language comedy film directed by Viji Thampi and written by Sasidharan Arattuvazhi. The film stars Madhu, Siddique, Jagadish, Urvashi and Jagathy Sreekumar in the lead roles.It is a remake of the 1979 Hindi film Gol Maal, which itself is a remake of the 1961 Bengali film Kanamachhi, of which some scenes were used in a previous Malayalam film Ayalvasi Oru Daridravasi (1986), directed by Priyadarsan, starring Mukesh and Prem Nazir in the corresponding roles. The film has musical score by S. P. Venkatesh.

== Plot ==
Hariprasad, a young rock musician, is forced by his uncle to attend an interview at a firm owned by Simhavalan Menon as the uncle fears that Hariprasad lacks purpose in life and would waste his life on music. His uncle gives him some pointers on how to impress Menon. He tells Hariprasad that Menon is a strict person, who upheld Gandhian values, likes classical music and above all forced everyone in the office to speak in Malayalam without the use of any English words.

Hariprasad goes to the interview pretending to be a person with the above attributes, he is hired by Menon after being impressed by his attitude and tells him that it is very rare that he sees such values in young men. But one day Menon is shocked to see him among some Cricket fans after a match, as Hariprasad had earlier told Menon that he needed half day off to visit a relative who was seriously ill. An angry Menon confronts him in the office next day and tells him he was most disappointed by his behaviour. Hariprasad, on sensing that he might get fired, manages to convince Menon that whom he had seen was in fact his wayward twin brother Giriprasad, which was a total lie.

He tells Menon that his brother was a good painter and Menon asks him to get his brother to teach painting to his daughter, Geetanjali. Hariprasad goes as Giriprasad to Menon's house and falls in love with Geetanjali. Menon decides to marry her to Hariprasad and tells Giriprasad of his intentions. Hariprasad juggles between both the persona in the movie and tries in every possible way not to let Menon know the truth.

== Cast ==
- Madhu as Simhavalan Menon / Gokulathu Gangadharan Gauridasan Menon
- Jagadish as Hariprasad / Giriprasad
- Jagathy Sreekumar as Adv. Kunjachan Kunjeria
- Urvashi as Geethanjali Menon
- Maniyanpilla Raju as Patrick
- K. B. Ganesh Kumar as Aravindan
- Siddique as Circle Inspector Jalram
- Sukumari as Subhadra Kunjamma
- Zeenath as Gomathi Menon
- Sangita as Urmila
- Jagannatha Varma as M. N. Nambiar
- Mahesh as Arun Nambiar
- Viji Thampi as Musthafa
- Jagannathan as Panicker
- Manu Varma as Charlie Varghese
- Biju Pappan as Shiva, Charlie's accomplice
- Rani Larius as Lady Smuggling Carrier

== Soundtrack ==
The music was composed by S. P. Venkatesh and the lyrics were written by Gireesh Puthenchery.

No.	Song	Singers	Lyrics	Length (m:ss)
1	"Chakkinu Vachathu"	Unni Menon, Chorus	Gireesh Puthenchery	
2	"Ee Ponthoovalum"	S. Janaki	Gireesh Puthenchery	
3	"Pon Kalabha Mazha"	K. J. Yesudas	Gireesh Puthenchery	
4	"Singing"	Mano, Bindhu	Gireesh Puthenchery	
