= Pavam Pavam Rajakumaran =

- Poster
- Directed by: Kamal
- Written by: Sreenivasan
- Produced by: Madhavan Nair
- Starring: Sreenivasan; Rekha; Siddique; Jagadish; Maniyanpilla Raju; Jayaram; Kottayam Santha; Usha
- Cinematography: Saloo George
- Edited by: K. Rajagopal
- Music by: Johnson
- Production company: Cherupushpam Films
- Release date: 4 May 1990
- Country: India
- Language: Malayalam

Pavam Pavam Rajakumaran (transl. The Poor Prince) is a 1990 Indian Malayalam-language romantic comedy film directed by Kamal and written by Sreenivasan. The film is based on the short story Kottu Baakki by S. K. Pottekkad. This film stars Sreenivasan, Rekha, Siddique, Jagadish and Maniyanpilla Raju. Jayaram appears in an extended guest role in the film, which was a huge hit at the box office. The sub-plots of the movie were used in the 1991 Tamil movie Gopura Vasalile.

== Plot ==
The film is about 4 parallel college teachers - Gopalakrishnan, Aravindan, Sujanapalan and Gangan who reside in the same rented house. Gopalakrishnan, who is the Hindi teacher, is a miser and apart from sharing the rent, does not contribute money for any household or luxury items, even in dangerous or urgent situations. Due to Gopalakrishnan's uncooperative and miserly behaviour and his weakness that he is searching girls for marriage, his friends decide to fool him by posting him love letters in the name of a girl named Radhika to get him to change his miserly habits. They succeed in making him believe that a girl named Radhika has fallen for him.

Gopalakrishnan receives the next letter finds out that Radhika that is a banker working near his college after his friends post him a letter saying she uses a certain bus service. Upon finding some information about Radhika, they persuade Shankarettan, the alcoholic peon in the bank where Radhika works, to help them write the letters. They make sure that he never meets Radhika personally through their letters, and to give anything he buys for her or any letters he writes to her Shankarettan. There is a change in Gopalakrishnan's frugal behaviour and his friends enjoy by posting love letters regularly, making him buy what they want, including chairs and a television under the pretext that Radhika had come to their house and she wanted such facilities, and alcohol by claiming it was for her drunk father and taking it for themselves through Shankarettan. They succeed in covering it up from Gopalakrishnan initially.

He gradually develops an intimate relationship with Radhika via correspondence, but all his efforts to meet her are in vain. He decides to commit suicide when his mother refuses to his marriage with Radhika, but she later agrees. The matter starts to lose control of the three men when he actually meets Radhika, whom he believes to be in love with her cousin Ashok, she fails to identify him and treats him as a maniac. Her father K. K. Menon whom he had believed to be an alcohol lover turns out to be an abstainer, and tries to assault him when he tells him to join him for a couple of drinks.

Gopalakrishnan finally confronts Radhika at a bus stand and is assaulted by bystanders who thinks he is misbehaving with Radhika. Her cousin Ashok admits him to an hospital and makes him realize someone has fooled him and he understands that his friends had fooled him and is heart broken . He meets and assures Radhika that he will not meet her again. Shattered he leaves his job and the city. Aravindan, Sujanapalan and Gangan feel guilty for what they have done and fail to find Gopalakrishnan. They believe he has committed suicide.

After 5 years, Aravindan receives a letter from Gopalakrishnan inviting him and his friends to Lovedale, a hill station in Tamil Nadu. It is from this point that the film actually begins. He calls Sujanapalan, who calls Gangan. All are shocked to hear he is alive, and decide to go. The rest of the story is shown as a flashback through their conversation. When they arrive at Lovedale, Gopalakrishnan threatens to murder them, but forgives them. They are pleasantly surprised to see Gopalakrishnan and Radhika being happily married. Gopalakrishnan reveals that he got a job in Lovedale as a teacher and accidentally met Radhika, who was posted in Lovedale as a banker. It was destiny which made them meet again and get married.

== Cast ==
- Sreenivasan as P. K. Gopalakrishnan
- Rekha as Radhika Menon
- Siddique as Aravindan
- Jagadish as Sujanapalan
- Maniyanpilla Raju as Gangadharan
- Jayaram as Ashok (Cameo Appearance)
- Mamukkoya as Sankaran / Sankarettan
- Innocent as K. K. Menon, Radhika's Father
- Oduvil Unnikrishnan as Principal Kurup
- K. P. A. C. Lalitha as Sarojini, Radhika's Mother
- Kottayam Santha as Gopalakrishnan's mother
- James as Postman
- Usha as Uma
- Paravoor Bharathan as Broker Narayanan Nair
- Viji Thampi as Bank Staff
- Praseetha Menon as Gopalakrishnan's sister

== Remakes ==
Year	Film	Language	Cast	Director
1991	Gopura Vasalile	Tamil	Karthik, Bhanupriya, Janagaraj, Nassar, Charle	Priyadarshan

== Soundtrack ==
The film's soundtrack contains 2 songs, both composed by Johnson and written by Kaithapram Damodaran. Both songs were chartbusters and are still popular amongst the masses.

#	Title	Singer(s)
1	"Kannaadikkayyil"	K. S. Chithra
2	"Paathimey Maranjathenthe"	K. J. Yesudas
