= Peruvannapurathe Visheshangal =

1989 film directed by Kamal

- Poster
- Directed by: Kamal
- Screenplay by: Ranjith
- Story by: Ranjith
- Produced by: Castle Productions
- Starring: Mohanlal; Jayaram; Parvathy; Jagathi Sreekumar; Innocent; Philomina; Oduvil Unnikrishnan
- Cinematography: Vipin Mohan
- Edited by: K. Rajagopal
- Music by: Johnson; P.K. Gopi (lyrics)
- Production company: Castle Productions
- Distributed by: Century Films
- Release date: 16 June 1989
- Running time: 120 minutes
- Country: India
- Language: Malayalam

Peruvannapurathe Visheshangal (transl. Happenings in Peruvannapuram) is a 1989 Indian Malayalam-language romantic comedy film directed by Kamal and written by Ranjith from a story by Kamal. It was produced by Castle Productions. The film features an ensemble cast that includes many well-known actors. The film stars Jayaram as Sivasankaran, who arrives in Peruvannapuram village to join as the new peon in a college, and Parvathy as Kunjulakshmi, a student and an arrogant girl from a wealthy aristocratic family who owns the college. Mohanlal has a cameo role as Achutha Kurup. The music was composed by Johnson.

== Plot ==
Kunjulakshmi is the only daughter of the aristocratic Kavumpattu family in Peruvannapuram. She is pampered by her five brothers and is arrogant. The family owns the local college.

Sivasankaran comes to the college as a peon to replace Keeleri Padmanabhan, who fails to give the promised donation to the Kavumpattu family in return for the job. Padmanabhan is despondent at the loss of his job. People in the village goad him to make life miserable for the new peon so that he would quit the job and leave the post vacant for Padmanabhan.

Padmanabhan starts exhorting money from Sivasankaran. Sivasankaran, on the other hand, finds out that his job includes helping the Kavumpattu family in household chores. When he takes lunch for Kunju, she laughs at him and taunts him. In the meantime, Sivasankar stands up to Padmanabhan and refuses to give him any more of his money.

Padmanabhan resorts to stealing coconuts from the Kavumpattu family estate to earn some money. Sivasankaran catches them and in the scuffle, he is accused of being the thief. He is let off on the intervention of the grandmother of the family. In the meantime, a love note that was written for Kunjulakshmi by a classmate ends up in her book, and she accuses Sivasankaran of writing her the letter. Kunjulakshmi gets into a fight with Sivasankaran. Her brothers join the fight, and Sivasankaran declares that he will marry Kunju in 15 days.

Although Kunjulakshmi hates Sivasankaran to that point, she realises that Sivasankaran is innocent. There is also a rumour that Sivasankaran is the son of Late Vamadevakurup and the erstwhile maid of Kavumpatt. All these melt the hatred that Kunjulakshmi had against Sivasankaran, which finally turns into sympathy and love. While everything is in their favour, things take a turn with the appearance of Achutha Kurup / Achu, who is actually the son of the late Vamadeva Kurup of Kavumpattu and is a successful businessman in Singapore.

== Cast ==
- Jayaram as Sivashankaran
- Parvathi as Kunju Lakshmi
- Jagathy Sreekumar as Keeleri Padmanabhan/Pappan
- Philomina as Kunju Lakshmi's grandmother
- Innocent as Adiyodi
- P. C. George as Veerabhadra Kuruppu (Valiya Kuruppu)
- Shivaji as Kuruppu
- Kundara Johnny as Gopala Kuruppu
- V. K. Sreeraman as Kannappa Kuruppu
- Santhosh as Chandukkutty Kuruppu
- Siddique as Antappan
- Kalpana as Mohini
- Kuthiravattam Pappu as Pushpangadan
- Oduvil Unnikrishnan as Appunni Nair
- Mammukoya as P. C. Peruvannapuram
- K. P. A. C. Lalitha as Madhavi Amma
- Sankaradi as College Principal Unnimathan
- Jagadish as Balan
- Idavela Babu as Suresh
- Paravoor Bharathan as Kalari Gurukkal
- James
- Mohanlal as Achutha Kuruppu (Cameo appearance)
- Kaviyoor Ponnamma as Devaki Amma (Cameo)

== Production ==
Initially, Kamal had Mohanlal in mind for the lead role when the story was envisioned, but later realising Mohanlal had done a similar character in an earlier film, the story background was changed to cast Jayaram in the lead, and Mohanlal appeared in a cameo role as Achutha Kurup, a significant character whose name is mentioned throughout the film and appears at the end.

A major part of the film was shot in Panjal, a village in the Thrissur district. The college known as Vamadevakurup Memorial College is actually a school called TRKHSS situated in Vaniamkulam in Palakkad district.

== Soundtrack ==
The film's soundtrack contains songs composed by Johnson and the lyrics written by P.K. Gopi.

#	Title	Singer(s)
1	"Title Score"	
2	"Pulkkodithan Chundathu Peythoru"	M. G. Sreekumar
3	"Pulkkodithan Chundathu Peythoru"	K.S. Chithra
4	"Kathirola Panthalorukki"	M. G. Sreekumar

== Reception ==
Peruvannapurathe Visheshangal was a major commercial success. Jayaram told in an interview that filmmaker P. Vasu once revealed to him that his 1991 Tamil film Chinna Thambi was inspired by the film.
