= Naranathu Thampuran =

2001 film by Viji Thampi

- Directed by: Viji Thampi
- Written by: Benny P Nayarambalam
- Starring: Jayaram; Kausalya; Rajan P. Dev
- Cinematography: Prethapan
- Edited by: A. Sreekar Prasad
- Music by: M. Jayachandran
- Release date: 18 July 2001
- Running time: 140 minutes
- Country: India
- Language: Malayalam

Naranathu Thampuran is a 2001 Indian Malayalam-language film directed by Viji Thampi. The film stars Jayaram and Kausalya (credited as Nandini). It was a hit and ran for more than 75 days in most centres.

== Cast ==
- Jayaram as Ananthan Varma
- Kausalya as Hemalatha
- Rajan P. Dev as Chandrappan, Ananthan's Uncle
- Siddique as Dr. Rajeev
- J. V. Somayajulu as Guruji
- Poornima Indrajith as Sridevi
- Janardhanan as Police officer Baburaj
- Maniyanpilla Raju as Mohandas
- Jagannatha Varma as Harikrishnan, Hemalatha's Father
- Harisree Ashokan as Sadan
- Ponnamma Babu as Nirmala
- Salim Kumar as Shivan
- Bindu Panicker as Premavathi
- Manka Mahesh as Saradha
- Baburaj as Vikraman
- Nandu as Santhosh, Snake Trainer
- Poojapura Ravi as Thamarakshan
- Augustine as Somanathan
- T.P Madhavan as Nambiyar
- Kanakalatha as Sulochana
- Kozhikode Narayanan Nair as Kunjiraman Nair
- Kochu Preman as Peethambaran
- Manu Varma as Kumar
- Shobha Sankar as saleswoman
- Shivaji as Chakochan

== Reception ==
A critic from Sify wrote, "On the whole Jayaram and Nandini carry the film on their shoulders".
