= James (Malayalam actor) =

Indian comic actor

James Chacko
- Born: Babychan; 16 October 1955; Kaduthuruthy, Kottayam, India
- Died: June 14, 2007 (aged 51); Kottayam, Kerala, India
- Resting place: St. Mary's Cathedral, Pattom, Trivandrum
- Occupation: Actor
- Years active: 1980–2007
- Spouse: Jiji James
- Children: Jikku James and Jilu James.
- Parent(s): Avira Chacko & Kathrikutty Chacko

James Chacko (16 October 1955 – 14 June 2007) was an Indian actor who starred in more than 150 Malayalam language films. He was active for over three decades. He joined the industry as an art and production manager and later was the manager for actor Nedumudi Venu. He played important roles in New Delhi, Meesa Madhavan, Pathram, Oru Maravathoor Kanavu and Peruvannapurathe Visheshangal. The character Pattalam Purushu played by James in the 2002 movie Meesa Madhavan has attained a cult status in Malayalam cinema.

== Death ==
James died following a cardiac arrest on 14 June 2007 at his brother's house at Kaduthuruthy.

== Filmography ==
Year	Title	Role	Notes
1985	Mutharamkunnu P.O.		
1985	Mukhya Manthri		
1985	Puli Varunne Puli	Hotel Manager	
1985	Aram + Aram = Kinnaram	Mechanic	
1985	Onningu Vannengil	Driver	
1986	Prathyekam Sradhikkukka		
1986	Pandavapuram		
1987	New Delhi		
1988	Oohakachavadam	James	
1988	Witness	Watchman	
1988	Sangham	Pappy	
1989	Vadakkunokkiyanthram		
1989	Season		
1989	Mahayanam		
1989	Peruvannapurathe Visheshangal		
1990	Pavam Pavam Rajakumaran	Postman	
1990	Kalikkalam	George	
1991	Sandesam	INSP member	
1992	Vietnam Colony	Colony man	
1992	Soorya Manasam	Muthu	
1993	Meleparambil Anveedu	Harikrishnan's helper	
1998	Oru Maravathoor Kanavu	Kuttapayi	
1999	Pathram	Aravindan	
1999	Vazhunnor	Pillai	
2000	Unnimaaya		
2000	Shivam		
2000	The Warrant	Lawrence	
2001	Naalaam Simham		
2002	Miss Suvarna		
2002	Meesa Madhavan	Pattalam Purushu	
2003	Pattalam		
2006	Yes Your Honour	Velayudhan	
2010	Pathinonnil Vyazham	Security guard	This film was made in 2005 released five years later
