= List of Malayalam films of 2001 =

The following is a list of Malayalam films released in the year 2001.

Title	Director	Cast
Akashathile Paravakal	V. M. Vinu	Kalabhavan Mani, Sindhu Menon, I. M. Vijayan
Achaneyanenikkishtam	Suresh Krishnan	Kalabhavan Mani, Biju Menon, Lakshmi Gopalaswamy
Antholanam	Jagadeesh Chandran	Kalabhavan Mani, Narendra Prasad, Ashokan
Aparanmaar Nagarathil	Nizar	Kottayam Nazeer, Kalabhavan Shajon, Jayasurya, Saju Kodiyan
Aram Indriyam	Kudamaloor Rajaji	Siddhique, Devan
Bhadra		Shankar, Vinaya Prasad
Bharthavudyogam	Suresh Vinu	Jagadeesh, Athira, Siddhique
Chithrathoonukal	T. N. Vasanthakumar	Vijayaraghavan, Anju Aravind
Dany	T. V. Chandran	Mammootty, Vani Vishwanath
Dhosth	Thulasidas	Dileep, Kunchacko Boban, Kavya Madhavan
Dubai	Joshiy	Mammootty, Anjala Zhaveri, Preetha Vijaykumar
Dupe Dupe Dupe	Nizar	Riza Bava
Ee Naadu Innale Vare	I. V. Sasi	Kalabhavan Mani, Lal, Vani Viswanath
Ee Parakkum Thalika	Thaha	Dileep, Nithya Das, Harisree Ashokan
Ennum Sambhavami Yuge Yuge	Alleppey Ashraf	Riyaz, Shalu Menon
Fort Kochi		Kalabhavan Mani, Vijayaraghavan, Devan
Goa	Nizar	Madhupal , Anusha, Devan
Ishtam	Sibi Malayil	Dileep, Navya Nair, Nedumudi Venu
Jagapoga		
Jeevan Masai		
Jyothirgamaya	N. B. Ragunath	
Kakkakuyil	Priyadarsan	Mohanlal, Mukesh, Arzoo Govitrikar, Ramya Krishnan
Kattu Vannu Vilichappol	Sasi Paravoor	Vijayaraghavan, Chippy, Krishnakumar
Kannaki	Jayaraj	Lal, Nandita Das, Geethu Mohandas, Siddiq
Karumadikkuttan	Vinayan	Kalabhavan Mani, Nandini
Kinnaram Cholli Cholli		
Korappan The Great	Sunil	Mamukkoya, Nadir Shah, Chandhini
Mazhamegha Pravukal	Kavi Pradeep	Kavya Madhavan, Krishna, Lalu Alex
Mazhanool Kanav	Nandan Kavil	Vineeth Kumar
Megasandesam	Rajasenan	Suresh Gopi, Samyuktha Varma, Rajasree
Meghamalhar	Kamal	Biju Menon, Samyuktha Varma
Nagaravadhu	Kaladharan	Vani Viswanath, Sai Kumar
Nakshathragal Parayathirunnathu	C. S. Sudhesh	Mukesh, Lal, Divya Unni
Nalacharitham Naalam Divasam	K Mohanakrishnan	Boban Alummoodan, Chandni Shaju
Naranathu Thampuran	Viji Thampi	Jayaram, Nandini
Narendran Makan Jayakanthan Vaka	Sathyan Anthikkad	Kunchacko Boban, Samyuktha Varma, Asin
Nariman	K. Madhu	Suresh Gopi, Samyuktha Varma
Neythukaran	Priyanandanan	Murali, Vijayaraghavan
One Man Show	Shafi	Jayaram, Samyuktha Varma, Lal, Kalabhavan Mani
Pattiyude Divasam		
Praja	Joshiy	Mohanlal, Aishwarya
Punyam	Rajesh Narayanan	Boban Alummoodan, Krishna Kumar, Narendra Prasad
Rakshasa Rajavu	Vinayan	Mammootty, Dileep, Meena, Kavya Madhavan
Randam Bhavam	Lal Jose	Suresh Gopi, Biju Menon, Thilakan, Poornima Mohan
Raavanaprabhu	Ranjith	Mohanlal, Vasundhara Das, Napoleon, Revathi
Saivar Thirumeni	Shajoon Karyal	Suresh Gopi, Samyuktha Varma, Manoj K Jayan
Sharja To Sharja	Venugopan	Jayaram, Aishwarya, M. N. Nambiar
Soothradharan	Lohithadas	Dileep, Meera Jasmine, Bindhu Panicker
Sravu	Anil Medayil	Babu Antony, Captain Raju
Sundara Purushan	Jose Thomas	Suresh Gopi, Mukesh, Devayani, Nandhini
The Campus		
Theerthadanam	Kannan	Jayaram, Suhasini Maniratnam
The Guard	Hakim	Kalabhavan Mani
Unnathangalil	Jomon	Manoj K. Jayan, Lal, Indraja, Poornima
Uthaman	Anil Babu	Jayaram, Siddiq, Sindhu Menon
Vakkalathu Narayanankutty	T. K. Rajeev Kumar	Jayaram, Mukesh, Manya
Yaamini		
Pathinaaraam Praayathile		
Ennathoni		
Swathithampuratti		
Sandya My Love		
Ninneyum Thedi		
Nayanam		
Swargavaathil		
Laasyam		
Maalavika		
Thaazhvara		
Ghaathakan		
Nee Enikkai Mathram		
Nimishangal		
Mohanayanangal		
Kaumaaram		
Thenthulli		
Chandanamarangal		
Pranayakaalathu		
Chaarasundari		
Miss Chalu		
Premaagni		
Ente Swarnam		
Maami		
Aalilathoni		
Ee Raavil		
Driving School		
Thaarunyam		
Naalaam Simham		
Pularvettam		
Kalluvaathukkal Kathreena		
Chenchaayam		
Aa Oru Nimisham		
Mookkuthi		
Mis Rathi		
Romance		
Kinavu Pole		
Layam		
Malaramban		
Laya Thalangal		
House Owner		
Kaadambari		

== Dubbed films ==
Title	Director	Screenplay	Cast
City Hospital	Moorthi		
Sukhamo Sukham	KR Joshi		
Dheena	AR Murukadas	AR Murukadas	Ajith Kumar, Suresh Gopi, Laila
Saranam Saranam Ponnayyappa			Ayyappa Nee Than Meyyappa
