= Suresh Poduval =

Indian director and screenwriter

- Born: Payyanur, Kerala, India
- Education: Calicut University
- Occupations: Screenwriter; Film director
- Years active: 1998–present
- Notable work: Deepasthambham Mahascharyam; Nadan Pennum Natupramaniyum; Achaneyanenikkishtam; College Kumaran
- Spouse: Uma Devi
- Children: 1
- Website: sureshpoduval.com

Suresh Poduval is an Indian film director and screenwriter who works in the Malayalam film industry. He is best known for his work on the films Deepasthambham Mahascharyam, Nadan Pennum Natupramaniyum, Achaneyanenikkishtam and College Kumaran.

== Early life and work ==
Poduval was born in Payyanur, Kannur to Krishnan Master, and Narayaniyamma. After graduating from the University of Calicut, Poduval worked as an temporary announcer in the All India Radio

He made his debut as a writer with Manthrikumaran, the 1998 film directed by Thulasidas, and starring Mukesh and Sangita in the lead roles. The following year Poduval wrote the movie Deepasthambham Mahascharyam. Directed by K. B. Madhu. His next film was Nadan Pennum Natupramaniyum (2000), directed by Rajasenan, and starring Jayaram and Samyuktha Varma in the titular roles. He reunited with Rajasenan in the film Megasandesam (2001). Later that year, he wrote the script for Suresh Krishnan's Achaneyanenikkishtam starring Kalabhavan Mani and Biju Menon.

His next film release came five years later when he collaborated with Anil Babu in the romance Parayam starring Jishnu and Bhavana. In 2008, he scripted Thulasidas' Mohanlal-starrer College Kumaran in 2008. He directed the documentary Oru Deshathinte Kala in 2015.

Poduval made his feature film directorial debut in 2019 with the Ulta. He also wrote the script for the film, which stars Gokul Suresh, Prayaga Martin, and Anusree in the lead roles.

== Filmography ==
Year	Title	Director
1998	Manthrikumaran	Thulasidas
1999	Deepasthambham Mahascharyam	K.B. Madhu
2000	Nadan Pennum Natupramaniyum	Rajasenan
2001	Megasandesam	Rajasenan
2001	Achaneyanenikkishtam	Suresh Krishnan
2006	Parayam	Anil Babu
2008	College Kumaran	Thulasidas
2019	Ulta	Himself
