= Nadan Pennum Natupramaniyum =

Naadan Pennum Naattupramaniyum
- VCD cover
- Directed by: Rajasenan
- Screenplay by: Suresh Poduval
- Story by: Rajasenan; Mahesh Mithra
- Starring: Jayaram; Samyuktha Varma; Srividya; Jagathy Sreekumar
- Cinematography: K. P. Nambiathiri
- Edited by: A. Sreekar Prasad
- Music by: A. B. Murali
- Production company: Trayo Vision
- Distributed by: Central Pictures; Century Release
- Release date: 4 February 2000
- Country: India
- Language: Malayalam

Naadan Pennum Naattupramaniyum (transl. Rural woman and the land's chief) is a 2000 Indian Malayalam-language action comedy drama film directed by Rajasenan and written by Suresh Poduval from a story by Rajasenan and Mahesh Mithra. The film stars Jayaram, Samyuktha Varma, Srividya and Jagathy Sreekumar. The film features music composed by A. B. Murali. The plot revolves around Govindan, a ruthless jeweler, and Gayathri, an employee in his jewelry store.

== Plot ==
Govindan, a ruthless businessman, is willing to go to any extent to make money. However, his life takes a drastic turn when Gayathri enters his life.

== Cast ==
- Jayaram as Govindan
- Samyuktha Varma as Gayathri Namboothiri
- Jagathy Sreekumar as Unni Pillai
- Srividya as Lakshmi,Govindan's mother
- KPAC Lalitha as Thankamani
- Kottayam Nazeer as Veeramani, Thankamani's brother
- Nithin satyan mohantees as young Govindan
- Harishree Ashokan as Pappan
- Indrans as Ganeshan
- Kalamandalam Kesavan as Vishnu Narayanan Namboothiri, Gayathri's father
- N. F. Varghese as Beeran
- Abu Salim as Selvam, Pichandi Perumal's henchman
- Chali Pala as Thomas
- T. P. Madhavan as Madhavan
- Vinu Chakravarthy as Pichadi Perumal, The main antagonist
- Jose Pellissery as Kuriakose
- Jayakumar Parameswaran Pillai as Ajayan
- Salim Kumar as Kelappan, Showroom Manager
- Sona Nair
- Payyans Jayakumar as Nandan

== Soundtrack ==
The music was composed by A. B. Murali.

No.	Song	Singers	Lyrics	Length (m:ss)
1	"Aalolam Ponnoonjalaadi"	Sreenivas	S. Ramesan Nair	
2	"Aathirathumbiye"	Santhosh Keshav	S. Ramesan Nair	
3	"Ilamanassin"	Chorus	S. Ramesan Nair	
4	"Madhuramee Sangamam" (D)	K. J. Yesudas, K. S. Chithra	S. Ramesan Nair	
5	"Madhuramee Sangamam" (D)	K. S. Chithra, Santhosh Keshav	S. Ramesan Nair	
6	"Madhuramee Sangamam" (F)	K. S. Chithra	S. Ramesan Nair	
7	"Mayilaadum Kunninmel"	Santhosh Keshav, Gopika Poornima	S. Ramesan Nair	
8	"Minnum Ponnurukki Theerthu"	K. J. Yesudas	S. Ramesan Nair	
9	"Sneham Thalirilakalil"	Santhosh Keshav	S. Ramesan Nair	
