= Nakhangal =

Nakhangal may refer to:

- Nakhangal (1973 film), Malayalam film released in 1973
- Nakhangal (2013 film), Malayalam film released in 2013
