= K. P. Nambiathiri =

Indian cinematographer

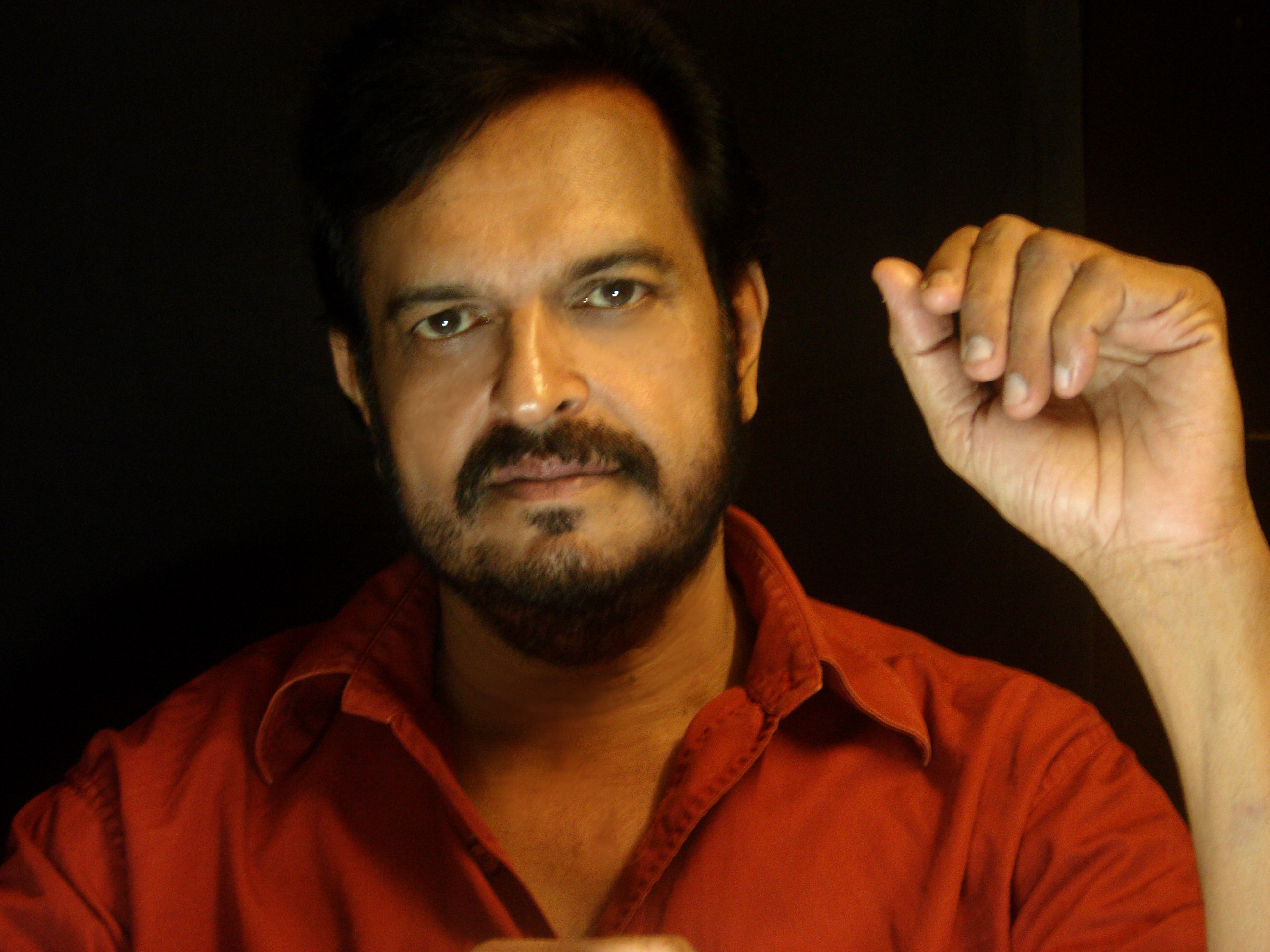
- K. P. Nambiathiri
- Born: Oachira, Kerala, India
- Occupations: Cinematographer; Stereographer
- Years active: 1979 — present

K. P. Nambiathiri is an Indian cinematographer who has worked in a number of 3-D films.

Nambiathiri was born in Kerala. He completed a three-year course in film technology at the Film and Television Institute of Tamil Nadu, Chennai. Later he worked for a brief period at Doordarshan Kendra, Chennai as a film processor. Then he joined the film industry and worked as assistant director, still photographer, and art director before joining StereoVision LA to learn stereography. Later he worked as an independent 3D consultant for a 3D film in Telugu in the year 1986.

Nambiathiri began his feature film career as a director of photography, with Lal Salam, directed by Venu Nagavally. He had also worked as Director of Photography on the Tamil film Eeramana Rojave in 1985. He has worked in over 65 feature films across Malayalam, Tamil, Telugu, Kannada and Hindi.

He is also the Head Stereographer for Chhota Chetan, Magic Magic 3D, Katari Veera Surasundarangi, Kurukshetra (2019) etc.

He was a jury member for the Kerala State Television Award committee in the year 2004 and has worked in addition on television commercials and documentary films.

== Filmography ==
- Bharya Swantham Suhruthu (2009)
- Romeoo (2007)
- Madhuchandralekha (2006)
- Kanaka Simhasanam (2006)
- Bunglavil Outha (2005)
- Vacation (2005)
- Vasanthamalika (2003)
- Achaneyanenikkishtam (2001)
- Kadhanayakan (1997)
- Kottapurathe Koottukudumbam (1997)
- Man of the Match (1996)
- Vatsalyam
- Aayirappara (1993)
- Aagneyam (1993)
- Samagamam (1993)
- Kizhakkunarum Pakshi (1991)
- Kalippattam
- Ulsavamelam (1992)
- Parvathy Parinayam (1995)
- Bheeshmacharya (1994)
- Agnidevan
- Shudharil Shudhan (2009)
- Avan (2010)
- Chotta Chetan 3D (1998)
- Njangal Santhushtaranu (1999)
- Sree Krishnapurathu Nakshathra Thilakkam (1998)
- Laalanam (1996)
- Lal Salam (1990 film)
- Naadan Pennum Naattu Pramaniyum (2000)
- Darling Darling (2000)
- Kottaram Veettile Apputtan (1998)
- Madhuchandralekha(2006)
- Mayakazhcha (2008)
- Vacation (2004)
- Makkal Mahatmyam (1992)
- Sasanam (2006)
- Muddai Muddugumma (1992)
- Abhi Abhi (1992)
- Anukudumbam.com (1995)
- Ennum Sambhavami Yuge Yuge (2001)
- Aanamuttathe Aangalamaar (2002)
- Ilamura Thamburan (1998)
- Eeramana Rojave (1991)
- Solai Kuyil (1989)
- Tarzan Sundhari (1988)
- Naalam Kettile Nalla Thampimar (1996)
- Uncle Bun (1991)
- Arabikadaloram (1995)
- Shobhanam (1998)
- Prem Poojari (1999)
- Majic Majic 3D (2002)
- Kanaka Simhasanam
- Saumyam (2004)
- Thadha (filming)
- Nala Charitham Naalam Divasam (2000)
- Melevaryathe Maalakha Kuttikal (2000)
- Avan Chandiyude Makan (2007)
- Moonnilonnu
- Avan (2010)
- Pathinonnil Vyazham
- Caribbean (filming)
