= Gomathiyin Kaadhalan =

- Theatrical release poster
- Directed by: P. Neelakantan
- Screenplay by: P. Neelakantan
- Based on: Gomathiyin Kaadhalan by Devan
- Produced by: T. R. Ramachandran
- Starring: T. R. Ramachandran; Savitri; K. A. Thangavelu; K. Sarangapani 'Friend' Ramasamy
- Cinematography: Nemai Ghosh
- Edited by: R. Devarajan; M. K. Ramani; M. N. Appu
- Music by: G. Ramanathan
- Production company: T. R. R. Productions
- Distributed by: National Pictures
- Release date: 16 September 1955
- Running time: 144 minutes
- Country: India
- Language: Tamil

Gomathiyin Kaadhalan (transl. Gomathi's lover) is a 1955 Indian Tamil language film directed by P. Neelakantan and starring T. R. Ramachandran, K. Savithri and K. A. Thangavelu. The film is an adaptation of the novel of the same name written by Devan. It was released on 16 September 1955.

== Plot ==
Gomathi is the daughter of Mullaivaasal, and Rajan is the younger son of Sinnaveli Zamindar. There is a long-standing feud between the two Zamin families. Gomathi is interested in arts and she acts in dramas. Rajan, without knowing that she is their family rival's daughter, falls in love with her after viewing her acting in a drama.

Gomathi's father sends her and his younger son Balu to Madras for studies. They stay in the house of a family friend, Dharmalingam. Sinnaveli Zamindar's elder son sends Rajan, also to Madras to Dharmalingam's house to get himself trained as a responsible person. Rajan becomes acquainted with Adukkumozhi Ananthar on the train. Two thieves, Mani and Pakkiri, are also traveling on the same train. While Rajan goes to the door to send off his acquaintance, the thieves take his suitcase and disappear. Rajan, having lost everything, sells his watch and wanders about. He accidentally meets Dharmalingam and becomes Dharmalingam's driver, giving his name as Ramu.

Gomathi and Rajan meet and fall in love. Rajan learns that Gomathi is the daughter of Mullaivasal Zamindar. He knows that there is a feud between his and her families. So he hides the fact that he is the younger son of Sinnaveli Zamindar.

Mani finds the diary of Rajan in the suitcase and, along with Pakkiri, goes to Dharmalingam's house impersonating as Rajan. They find the real Rajan employed there as a driver.

After many twists and turns Rajan's real identity is revealed and the thieves are caught with the brilliant and timely help of the young boy Balu. The two Zamin families forget their feud. Rajan and Gomathi get married.

== Cast ==
The following list is compiled from the film's song book.

Male cast

- T. R. Ramachandran as Rajan
- K. Sarangapani as Dharmalingam
- K. A. Thangavelu as Mani
- Friend Ramasami as Pakkiri
- D. Balasubramaniam as Barrister Somasundaram
- R. Balasubramaniam as Mullaivasal Zamindar
- P. D. Sambandam as Chinnaveli Accountant
- V. R. Rajagopal as Babu
- K. D. Santhanam as Chinnaveli Zamindar
- Sayeeraman as Kokku
- Narayana Pillai as Layman Anandar
- V. P. S. Mani as K. T. Pillai
- S. S. Sivasooriyan as Moorthi
- Hariharan as Lawyer
- P. Kalyanam as Mullaivasal Accountant
- Master Ranganathan as Balu

Female cast

- Savithri as Gomathi
- T. P. Muthulakshmi as Ponnayi
- P. Susheela as Sundari
- Dhanam as Kalyani
- P. S. Gnanam as Parvatham
- S. R. Janaki as Chinnaveli Lady Zamindar
- Saradambal as Bhagyam
- T. K. Pattammal as Friend
- Bala as Friend

Dance

- Sayee, Subbulakshmi
- Ragini
- Thangam
- Sukumari

== Production ==
The film was produced by actor T. R. Ramachandran under the banner TRR Productions, and was directed by P. Neelakantan who also wrote the screenplay and dialogue. Lyricist Ku. Ma. Balasubramaniam was one of the assistant directors. The story is an adaptation of a novel by the same name written by Devan and was serialised in Ananda Vikatan. M. K. Ramani, M. N. Appu and N. Meenakshisundaram did the editing. Cinematography was done by Nimai Ghosh. C. Raghavan was in charge of Art direction while K. N. Dandayudhapani and Sohanlal handled the choreography. Photography was done by R. Venkatachari.

== Soundtrack ==
Music was composed by G. Ramanathan. The songs Vanameedhil Neendhi Odum Vennilaave and Kongu Nattu Sengarumbe was recorded with both singers Thiruchi Loganathan and Seerkazhi Govindarajan and were published in 78-RPM records. But the version by Seerkazhi Govindarajan was only included in the film.

In the song book, the songs "Sirpa Kalai Vizhaavin", "Imaiyum Vizhuiyum Ennai", "Kavignan Paada Thonnootru Onbathu" and "Kula Perumai Veri" are listed together as a single medley.

| Song | Singers | Lyrics | Length |
|---|---|---|---|
| "Ananganai Nigarththa Azhagane" | Jikki | K. P. Kamatchisundharam | 02:40 |
| "Vaanameedhil Neendhi Odum Vennilaave" | Seerkazhi Govindarajan | Ku. Ma. Balasubramaniam | 03:00 |
| "Vaanameedhil Neendhi Odum Vennilaave" | Thiruchi Loganathan | Ku. Ma. Balasubramaniam | 03:00 |
| "Neelavaan...Pudhumai Nila Ange" | A. M. Rajah | Ku. Ma. Balasubramaniam | 02:06 |
| "Anbe En Aaruyire Vaaraai" | Seerkazhi Govindarajan & Jikki | Ku. Ma. Balasubramaniam | 04:02 |
| "Varavendaam Endru Solladi" | A. P. Komala | Ku. Ma. Balasubramaniam | 02:01 |
| "Kaaviya Kaadhal Vaazhvil Oviyam Naame" | A. M. Rajah & Jikki | Ku. Ma. Balasubramaniam | 02:56 |
| "Theeraadha Emaatrama" | | Ku. Ma. Balasubramaniam | |
| "Sirpa Kalai Vizhaavin" | (Radha) Jayalakshmi & T. V. Rathnam | K. D. Santhanam | 01:12 |
| "Imaiyum Vizhuiyum Ennai" | (Radha) Jayalakshmi & P. Leela | K. D. Santhanam | 04:28 |
| "Kavignan Paada.... Thonnootru Onbathu" | T. V. Rathnam & P. Leela | K. D. Santhanam | 01:18 |
| "Kula Perumai Veri" | T. V. Rathnam | K. D. Santhanam | 00:38 |
| "Minnuvadhellaam Ponnendru Enni" | Seerkazhi Govindarajan & Jikki | K. D. Santhanam | 03:11 |
| "Kongu Naattu Sengkarumbe" | Seerkazhi Govindarajan | K. D. Santhanam | 02:18 |
| "Kongu Naattu Sengkarumbe" | Thiruchi Loganathan | K. D. Santhanam | 02:18 |
| "Thelli Tharum Tinai Maa" | Seerkazhi Govindarajan | Ku. Mu. Annal Thango | 02:41 |
