= Perumbavoor G. Raveendranath =

Indian musician from Kerala (born 1944)

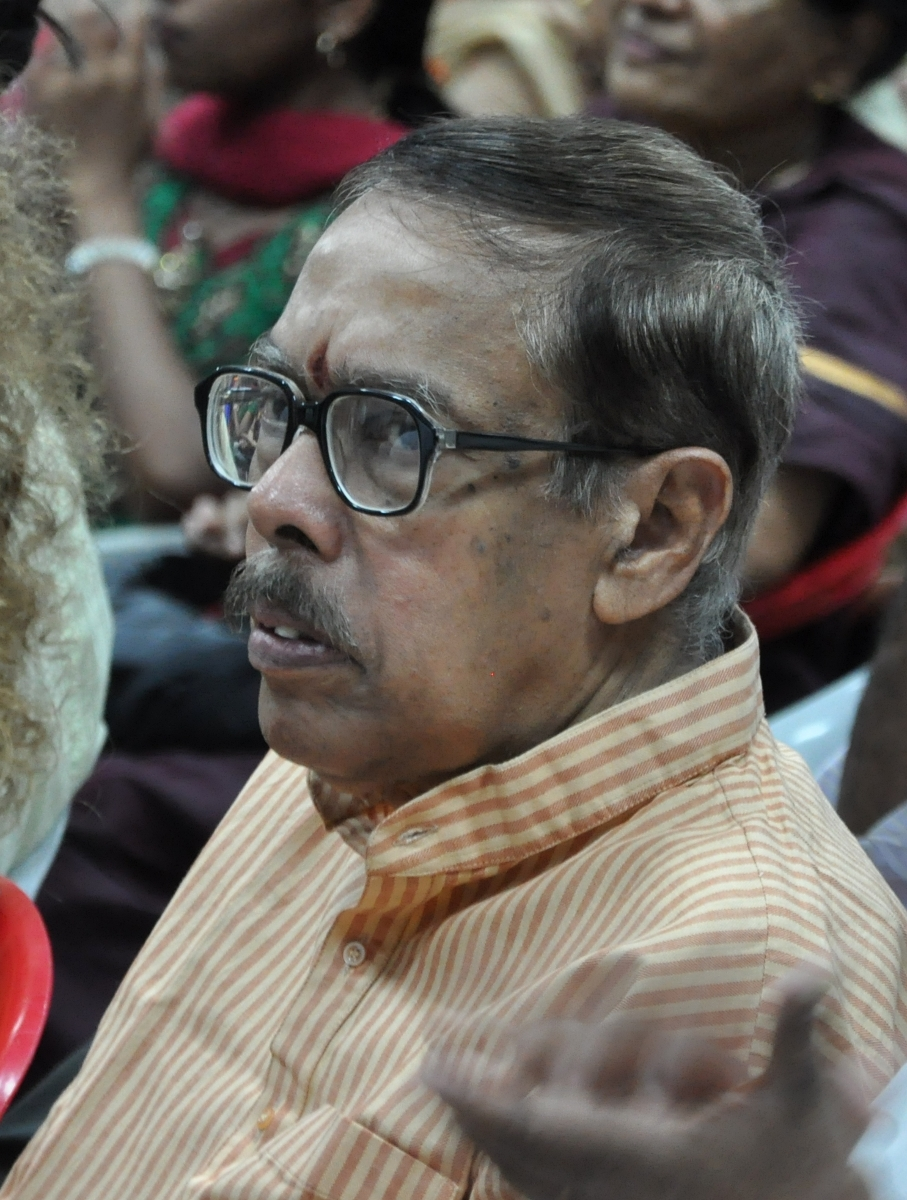
- Born: 5 January 1944 (age 82); Perumbavoor, Ernakulam, Kerala
- Occupation: music director
- Years active: 1987-present

Perumbavoor Gopalapillai Raveendranath is an Indian musician, composer, and Carnatic vocalist from the state of Kerala. He is known for his contributions to both Carnatic music and Malayalam film music. Originally from Perumbavoor in Ernakulam district, he is based in Thiruvananthapuram. His musical compositions are noted for their strong foundation in the Carnatic tradition.

== Personal life ==
Raveendranath was born on 5 January 1944 in Perumbavoor, in present-day Ernakulam district, to advocate V. R. Gopalapillai and Bhargaviamma. He was the youngest of their children and lost his father at the age of one and a half years. He obtained a bachelor's degree in chemistry from Sree Sankara College, Kalady. He is married to Shobha Menon, and the couple have two children.

== Career ==
Raveendranath composed music for several Malayalam films, including Innale, Sneham, and Thoovanathumbikal. He received the Kerala State Film Award for Best Music Director for his work on Innale, directed by P. Padmarajan. Raveendranath also collaborated with K. J. Yesudas on a number of Malayalam devotional music albums produced by Tharangani Studio. Among these was the album Thrimadhuram.

== Discography ==
- Thoovanathumbikal (1987)
- Vaadaka Gunda (1989)
- Panchali (1989)
- Innale (1990)
- Bharathi Nagar May 9 (1990)
- Post Box No. 27 (1991)
- Vasudha (1992)
- Ayalathe Adheham (1992)
- Alancheri Thamprakkal (1995)
- Aksharam (1995)
- Chitrasalabham (1998)
- Sneham (1998)
- Sayahnam (2000)
- Thandavam (2002)
- Vasanthamalika (2003)
- Vasanthathinte Kanal Vazhikalil (2014)
- Randam Yaamam (year unavailable)
- Poomaram (2018)==Awards==
- 1990 - Kerala State Film Award for Best Music Director - Innale
- 1994 - Kerala Sangeetha Nataka Akademi Award
- 2017 - Kerala Sangeetha Nataka Akademi Fellowship
