= Bharya Onnu Makkal Moonnu =

2009 Malayalam film by Rajasenan

- DVD cover
- Directed by: Rajasenan
- Screenplay by: Kishore (Associate scriptwriter) Rajasenan
- Story by: Reji Prabhakaran
- Produced by: Alex
- Starring: Rajasenan; Sithara; Jagathy Sreekumar
- Cinematography: Saloo George
- Edited by: Samjith
- Music by: M. Jayachandran; Rajeev Alunkal (lyrics)
- Production company: Jini Cinema
- Distributed by: Jini Cinema Release
- Release date: 29 July 2009
- Running time: 130 minutes
- Country: India
- Language: Malayalam

Bharya Onnu Makkal Moonnu (English: Wife: One, Children: Three) is a 2009 Indian Malayalam-language family-drama film co-written and directed by Rajasenan, who also stars in the film in the lead alongside Sithara. This is Rajasenan's debut film as a lead actor.

== Plot ==
Chandramohan Thampi has never been able to live up to the expectations of his father Sachidanandan Thampi. On the other hand, his younger brother Rajmohan Thampi has made it big in business. Problems mount up when he marries Lisamma, a Christian girl from a poor family. He becomes a post master and walks out of his home.

Lisamma has a heart ailment and Chandramohan borrows money to treat her. Some time later, the couple has three children. Meanwhile, Chandramohan's debts pile up. His schoolmate GK takes him to the UAE to help him recover his debts. But after a few months, Chandramohan dies at Dubai due to health issues. The rest of the movies shows how the family deals with the tragedy.

== Cast ==
- Rajasenan as Chandramohan Thampi
- Mukesh as Gopi Krishnan (GK)
- Sithara as Lisamma
- Shivaji Guruvayoor as Sachidanandan Thampi
- Jagathy Sreekumar as Ramachandran Thampi
- Rahman as Rajmohan Thampi
- Sindhu Menon
- Indrans as Moidheen
- Kalpana
- Sumithra
- Drisya
- Master Deepak
