= Gopulu =

Tamil illustrator and cartoonist

S. Gopalan, pen-name Gopulu (18 June 1924 – 29 April 2015), was a Tamil illustrator and cartoonist, known for his work for the Tamil humour magazine Ananda Vikatan.

Born in Tanjore in 1924, Gopulu spent his early years in the city. He studied at the Kumbakonam School of Art. In 1941, he came to Chennai looking for a job in Ananda Vikatan. There, he met "Mali", a cartoonist who commissioned a number of paintings for the magazine's Deepavali special. It was not till December 1944, however, that Mali offered Gopulu a job at the magazine. Mali was also the one who gave Gopulu his pen-name. In the course of the next twenty or so years, till 1968, Gopulu did political cartoons, cover designs and illustrated columns for the magazine.

As an illustrator, Gopulu worked on popular serials such as Thillana Mohanambal and Washingtonil Thirumanam. He is known for his work with the writer Devan for whom he illustrated the serial Thuppariyum Sambu in comics form. Devan's bumbling detective is remembered in the form in which Gopulu first drew him. Gopulu also traveled with the writer Saavi in 1953–54, to Ajanta, Ellora, Delhi, Jaipur, Calcutta for a travel series.

In 1972, Gopulu started his own ad agency, Ad Wave Advertising. He designed the logo of the Tamil magazine Kungumam, and that of Sun TV too. Later, he quit advertising and began to work as a freelance illustrator for magazines such as Kalki, Amudhasurabhi, Vikatan and Kungumam.

Gopulu was given the ‘Kalaimamani' award by the Government of Tamil Nadu on 26 November 1991. He is a recipient of the Murasoli Award and the M. A. Chidambaram Chettiar Award. In 2001 he was honoured with the lifetime achievement award as part of the inaugural function of the Indian Institute of Cartoonists in Bangalore.

== Bibliography ==
Washingtonil Thirumanam, written by Saavi, illustrated by Gopulu (Narmadha Pathipagam, 1999).

Gopulu's cartoons have been published in books by Vikatan Prasuram.
