= Immini Nalloraal =

- Directed by: Rajasenan
- Written by: Rajasenan
- Produced by: Joseph Onisserril
- Starring: Jayasurya; Navya Nair; Bindu Panicker
- Cinematography: K. P. Nambiathiri
- Edited by: Raja Muhammed
- Music by: M. Jayachandran
- Release date: 4 February 2005
- Country: India
- Language: Malayalam

Immini Nalloraal is a 2005 Malayalam film written and directed by Rajasenan. This film stars Jayasurya, Navya Nair, Janardhanan and Bindu Panicker.

== Plot ==
Sneha is a popular actress and Jeevan is a junior artist who is attracted to her. Sneha goes to Jeevan's village for a movie shoot. During the shoot, Jeevan, acting as a double for the hero, marries Sneha in a scene. One day while shooting, Jeevan kidnaps Sneha and takes her to an unknown location and he enjoying inside a forest with Sneha for some days . Sneha's family and her colleagues try to negotiate with Jeevan for Sneha's return but Jeevan does not want to return Sneha.He tried to keep Sneha with him and from outside society. Sneha try to escape from him by acting fake love, dancing with him and also hugging him. But that all fails.After a few days of keeping her as a hostage, Jeevan decides to give her back and surrenders to the police. Sneha meets Jeevan in a mental asylum. He confesses that he took Sneha as a hostage because he saw her suicide note in her diary. Sneha understands the true love he has for her and saves him from the charges that were awaiting him. Finally they marry and transform from a reel-to-real-life couple.

== Cast ==
- Jayasurya as Jeevan Pillai
- Navya Nair as Sneha Nair
- Janardhanan as Bhaskara Pillai
- Bindu Panicker as Vishalam
- Kochu Preman as Barbar
- Siddique as Dr. Issac
- Madhu Warrier as Rahul
- Cochin Haneefa as Sub Inspector PK Shibu
- Salim Kumar as Kittunni
- Subair as Police Officer Suresh Gopi
- Kannur Vasutty as Director Mohanlal
- Kamal as himself

== Soundtrack ==
- "Komalavalli" - Rajesh Vijay , Jyotsna Radhakrishnan
- "Koottukaare" - Jyotsna Radhakrishnan, Vijay Yesudas
- "Onnu Kaanuvaan (Duet)" - Sujatha, Santhosh Keshav
- "Onnu Kaanuvaan (Female)" - Sujatha
- "Thattana Muttana" - Afsal
