= Aagraham =

Aagraham may refer to:

- Aagraham (1984 film), an Indian Malayalam-language film
- Aagraham (1991 film), an Indian Telugu-language action drama film
