= Rajasenan =

Indian film director

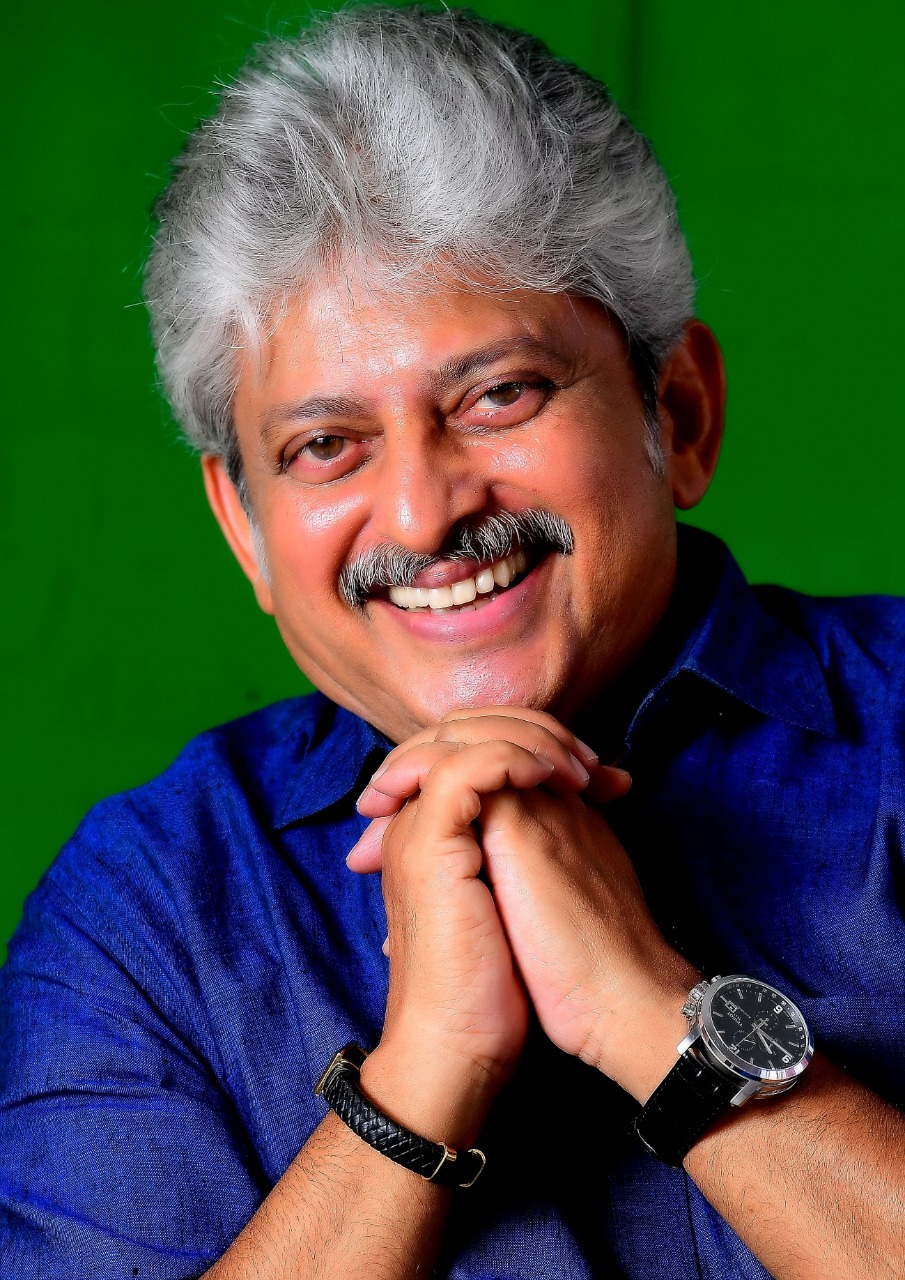
- Born: 20 August 1958 (age 68)
- Occupations: Film director; screenwriter; actor; businessman
- Years active: 1984–Present
- Spouse: Sreelatha
- Children: 1

Rajasenan (born 20 August 1958) is an Indian film director who has worked in Malayalam cinema. He is one of the most successful directors in 90s Malayalam film industry. Rajasenan also worked in the TV serial industry. He directed some serials and also acted in some. He is mostly remembered for his association with actor Jayaram and the popular duo has worked together in 16 movies.

== Career ==
He made his debut with the 1984 film Aagraham. His notable films include Kadinjool Kalyanam (1991), Ayalathe Adheham (1992), Meleparambil Aanveedu (1993), CID Unnikrishnan B.A., B.Ed (1994), Vardhakya Puranam (1994), Aadyathe Kanmani (1995), Aniyan Bava Chetan Bava (1995), Kadhanayakan (1997), The Car (1997), Sreekrishnapurathe Nakshathrathilakkam (1998), and Darling Darling (2000). Rajasenan also acted in the lead role in Bharya Onnu Makkal Moonnu (2009), which was also directed by himself. Rajasenan had Jayaram as his lead role in 16 of his 37 films (to date), of which the vast majority were hit movies.

== Personal life ==
He is married to Sreelatha and has a daughter, Devika. Rajasenan's late father, Appukuttan Nair was a dance master.

== Filmography ==
=== Director ===
Year	Film	Writer
1984	Aagraham	Thulasidas
1984	Paavam Krooran	Yes
1985	Soundaryappinakkam	Yes
1985	Santham Bheekaram	Baton Bose
1986	Onnu Randu Moonu	Yes
1987	Kanikanum Neram	Joseph Vattoli
1991	Kadinjool Kalyanam	Reghunath Paleri
1992	Ayalathe Addeham	Sasidharan Arattuvazhi
1993	Meleparambil Aanveedu	Reghunath Paleri
1994	CID Unnikrishnan B.A., B.Ed.	Sasidharan Arattuvazhi
1994	Vardhakya Puranam	Sasidharan Arattuvazhi
1995	Aniyan Bava Chetan Bava	Rafi–Mecartin
1995	Aadyathe Kanmani	Rafi–Mecartin
1996	Swapna Lokathe Balabhaskaran	Reghunath Paleri
1996	Sathyabhamakkoru Premalekhanam	Sreedevi
1996	Dilliwala Rajakumaran	Rafi–Mecartin
1997	The Car	Rajan Kiriyath; Vinu Kiriyath
1997	Kadhanayakan	Mani Shornnur
1998	Sreekrishnapurathe Nakshathrathilakkam	Mani Shornnur
1998	Kottaram Veettile Apputtan	Mani Shornnur
1999	Njangal Santhushtaranu	Rajan Kizhakenala
2000	Nadan Pennum Natupramaniyum	Suresh Poduval
2000	Darling Darling	Udaykrishna–Sibi K. Thomas
2001	Megasandesam	Suresh Poduval; M. Sindhuraj
2002	Malayali Mamanu Vanakkam	Udaykrishna–Sibi K. Thomas
2002	Nakshathrakkannulla Rajakumaran Avanundoru Rajakumari	V. C. Ashok
2003	Swapnam Kondu Thulabharam	Reghunath Paleri
2005	Immini Nalloraal	Yes
2006	Madhuchandralekha	Reghunath Paleri
2006	Kanaka Simhasanam	Yes
2007	Romeoo	Rafi–Mecartin
2009	Bharya Onnu Makkal Moonnu	Yes
2010	Oru Small Family	Yes
2011	Innanu Aa Kalyanam	Baharuddin
2013	72 Model	Yes
2013	Radio Jockey	Yes
2014	Wound	Yes
2023	Njanum Pinnoru Njanum	Yes
TBA	Oru Pan Indian Kalyanam	

=== Producer ===
1. Wound (2014)

=== Writer ===
1. Wound (2014) (writer)
2. Madhuchandralekha (2006) (story)
3. Immini Nalloraal (2005) (writer)
4. Swapna Lokathe Balabhaskaran (1996) (story) (as Sridevi)
5. Aadyathe Kanmani (1995) (story) (as Sridevi)
6. Marupacha (1982) (Writer) (Uncredited)

=== Music Composer ===
1. Soundaryappinakkam (1985)
2. Onnu Randu Moonnu (1986)

=== Actor ===
1. Paalum Pazhavum (2024) as Devu
2. Njanum Pinnoru Njanum (2023) as Thulasidhara Kaimal aka TK
3. Priyapettavar (2018) as Gopinathan Menon
4. Thinkal Muthal Velli Vare (2015) as Himself
5. Wound (2014) as Devadas
6. Oru Small Family (2010) as R. Vishwanathan
7. Nalla Pattukare (2010)
8. Bharya Onnu Makkal Moonnu (2009) as Chandramohan Thampi
9. Kanninum Kannadikkum (2004) as Himself
10. Soundaryappinakkam (1985) as Potti
11. Sree Ayyappanum Vavarum (1982) as Indra

== Television ==
Serials

As director

- Sambavami Yuge Yuge (Surya TV)
- Bhagyanakshatram
- Krishnakripasagaram (Amrita TV)

As actor

- Ente Manasaputhri (Asianet)
- Parinayam (Mazhavil Manorama)
- Swathi Nakshatram Chothi (Zee Keralam)
- Athira (Surya TV)

Other shows

- Sallapam (DD)
- Sangeetha Sagaram (Asianet)
- Sangeetha Sagaram (Asianet Plus)
