= Iqbal Kuttippuram =

Indian screenwriter

Dr. Iqbal Kuttippuram
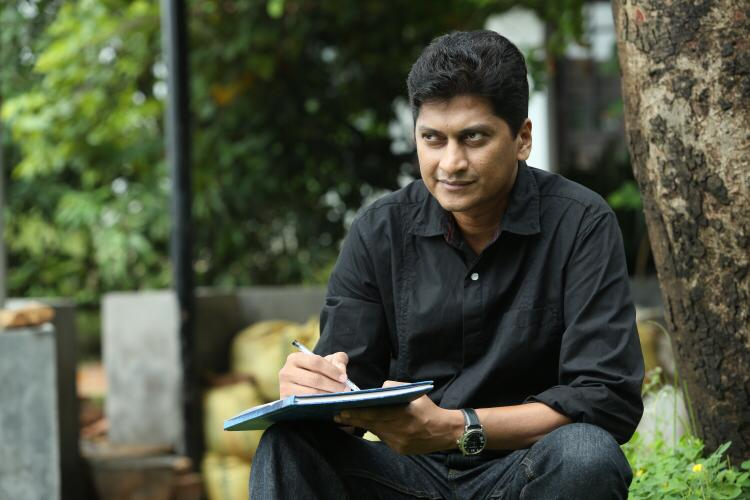
- Born: Kuttipuram, Kerala, India
- Occupations: Homeopathy Physician, Scriptwriter
- Writing career
- Genres: story, screenplay, dialogues

Mohamed Iqbal Kompathayill, commonly credited as Dr. Iqbal Kuttippuram, is an Indian screenwriter and homeopathy physician. He has written screenplays for popular Malayalam films such as Niram, Arabikkatha, Swapnakoodu, Vikramadithyan and 4 the people.

== Biography ==
He was born on 15 May 1970, in Kuttipuram in the Malappuram District, Kerala. His father is Kompatheyill Mohamedali and mother is Raramkandath Nafeeza. He completed his studies at GHSS Kuttippuram and MES College Ponnani.

After his pre-graduation he joined Dr. Padiar Memorial Homeopathic Medical College, Ernakulam, Kerala, for DHMS, Government Homoeopathic Medical College Kozhikode for BHMS and Maharashtra University of Health Sciences for MD (HOM) for his studies in Homoeopathic Medical Science. Currently, he works in Dubai as a homoeopathic physician.

He started his career by writing the story and screenplay of the serial Koodumattam which was telecast on Doordarshan in 1991. This serial won that year's state awards. Gradually, he started getting involved in story discussions with Kamal, who was the director of Koodumattam. Later Kamal asked him to write the script for a campus film (Niram). Even though he was a debutante, the film Niram became a phenomenal hit. He has scripted films like Arabikkatha and Diamond Necklace, which were highly successful critically and commercially.

== Filmography ==
- Niram (1999) (story)
- Nuvve Kavali (2000) (story)
- Piriyadha Varam Vendum (2001) (story)
- Meghamalhar (2001) (story)
- Ninagagi (2002) (story)
- Gramaphone (2003)
- Tujhe Meri Kasam (2003) (story)
- Swapnakoodu (2003) (story, screenplay)
- 4 the People (2004)
- Arabikkatha (2007)
- Sevenes (2011)
- Diamond Necklace (2012)
- Oru Indian Pranayakatha (2013)
- Vikramadithyan (2014)
- Jomonte Suvisheshangal (2017)
- Meow (2021)
- Makal (2022)
