= Sneham (1998 film) =

- Directed by: Jayaraj
- Written by: T. A. Razzaq
- Starring: Jayaram; Jomol; Kasthuri; Biju Menon
- Music by: Perumbavoor G. Raveendranath
- Release date: 29 November 1998
- Country: India
- Language: Malayalam

Sneham is a 1998 Indian Malayalam-language film, directed by Jayaraj. The film stars Jayaram, Jomol, Kasthuri and Biju Menon in the lead roles. Perumbavoor G. Raveendranath composed the music. This was Jomol's debut film as a lead actress.

== Cast ==
- Jayaram as Padmanabhan Nair
- Jomol as Manikkutti
- Kasthuri as Radhika
- Biju Menon as Sasidharan Nair
- Siddique as Sivankutty
- Lena as Ammu
- V. K. Sreeraman as Bhaskaran Mama
- Vavachan as Omanakkuttan
- Captain Raju
- Kunjhukutty Varassiar as Muthassi

== Soundtrack ==
Soulful melodies. Heart melting songs.

All lyrics are written by Yusufali Kechery; all music is composed by Perumbavoor G. Raveendranath.

Track listing
No.	Title	Artist(s)	Length
1.	"Devabhaavana Mannil"	K. J. Yesudas
2.	"Kaithappoo Manamenthe"	Radhika Thilak, Choir
3.	"Kondotteennodivanne"	Sudeep Kumar
4.	"Marakkaan Kazhinjengil"	K. J. Yesudas
5.	"Perariyaathoru Nombarathe"	K. J. Yesudas
6.	"Raavu Nilaappoovu"	K. J. Yesudas

== Reception ==
K. Jayalakshmi of Deccan Herald wrote "An award winning performance from Jayaram, this one from Jayaraaj is a must-see for those who are looking for good acting. Nevertheless, be warned, this is no entertainer, no laughs, only hard facts about life, the trials and tears that come in the path of a do-gooder".
