= Kanaka Simhasanam =

- DVD cover
- Directed by: Rajasenan
- Written by: Rajasenan
- Screenplay by: Biju Vattappara
- Produced by: M. Mani
- Starring: Jayaram; Lakshmi Gopalaswami; Karthika Mathew; Kiran Raj
- Cinematography: K. P. Nambiathiri
- Edited by: Raja Muhammad
- Music by: M. Jayachandran; S. P. Venkitesh(Background Score)
- Production company: Sunitha Productions
- Distributed by: Aroma Films
- Release date: 23 December 2006
- Country: India
- Language: Malayalam

Kanaka Simhasanam (transl. Golden throne) is a 2006 Indian Malayalam-language action-comedy film directed by Rajasenan. The film stars Jayaram, Lakshmi Gopalaswami, Karthika and Kiran Raj.

== Plot ==
Kanakambaran runs a drama troupe along with his wife Bharati. The couple struggle to keep the loss-making company going, even as creditors are breathing down their necks.

One day, they strike gold when Upendra Varma and Radhakrishna Varma ask them to take part in a real-life drama: they want Kanakambaran to play Suryanarayanan, the heir to the throne of the palace and childhood sweetheart/ husband of the princess Kanjanalakshmi, who went missing 24 years ago.

Kanakambaran takes up the challenge and as time goes, recruits his wife as the cook at the royal palace; in the meantime, a bad guy Narasimhan also has an eye for Kanjanalakshmi.

Narasimhan tries to prove that Kanakan is not the real prince through various methods, but fails every time. He brings in Indrasenan Reddy, the royal advisor for the same, but Indrasenan, aware of the evil intentions of Narasimhan and the Telugu speaking community in the palace, helps Kanakan as he is strong enough to protect the princess.

After Gopalan, Kanakan's brother-in-law, blabbers in the effect of alcohol, Indrasenan realizes that Kanakambaran is actually Suryanarayanan, who was sent away and later adopted by the palace cook, when an internal attack was made on the royal members 24 years ago. Though he learns the truth, he hides it.

In the meantime, Narasimhan and gang, with the help of Tripurasundari gets the information of Kanakan being a drama artist and exposes him, leading to the heartbreak of Kanchanalakshmi.

The next day, Narasimhan tries to marry Kanchanalakshmi forcefully but ends up being beaten up by Kanakambaran and his gang, now having learnt the truth of his real identity.

After a fight, Kanakambaran returns to the drama world and Narasimhan becomes a good man. Later, Kanjanalakshmi is married to Narasimhan. The story ends with the song of the drama couples dancing.

== Cast ==
- Jayaram as Kasaragod Kanakambaran/ Suryanarayanan
- Lakshmi Gopalaswami as Kanchanalakshmi, Suryanarayanan's love interest
- Karthika Mathew as Marthandom Bharathi, Kanakambaran's wife
- Kiran Raj as Narasimhan Raju
- Kalasala Babu as Indrasena Reddy, Guruji the Royal advisor
- Suraj Venjaramoodu as Marthandom Gopalan, Bharathi's brother and Kanakambaran's brother-in-law
- Janardhanan as Upendra Varma
- Bheeman Raghu as Radhakrishna Varma
- Subi Suresh as Tripurasundari
- Baby Nayanthara as Ammukutty, Kanakambaran's daughter
- Geetha Salam Rishikesha Kaimal, Kanakambaran's father who earlier worked in royal palace
- Kochu Preman as Chennakeshav Reddy
- Saju Kodiyan as Avarachan
- Tom Jacob as Philipose

== Soundtrack ==
Rajeev Alunkal has the Lyrics M. Jayachandran has composed the music and has set five tunes for the film.

- 1 "Priyathame" by K. J. Yesudas & K. S. Chithra
- 2 "Sundarano" by Sujatha [Raga: Punnagavarali]
- 3 "Azhakaarnna" by Sankaran Namboothiri, Ganga & Priya [Raga: Begada]
- 4 "Sundarano" by M. Jayachandran & Sujatha [Raga: Punnagavarali]
- 5 "Mahaganapathi (Ganapathi Slokam)"by Madras Chellappa
