= Thillana Thillana =

- Directed by: T. S. Saji
- Written by: Vinu Kiriyath
- Produced by: M. A. Nishad
- Starring: Krishna; Jomol; Kaveri
- Cinematography: Vipin Mohan
- Edited by: K. G vijayan R. A. Kannadasan
- Music by: Rajamani; C. Thankaraj
- Release date: 2 May 2003
- Country: India
- Language: Malayalam

Thillana Thillana is a 2003 Indian Malayalam-language comedy drama film directed by T. S. Saji and produced by M. A. Nishad. The film stars Krishna, Jomol, Kaveri, Kalabhavan Navas and Jagathy Sreekumar. It was completed in 2000, but remained unreleased for almost three years due to financial issues.

== Plot ==
The movie deals with a young college boy named Bobby, trying to find his hidden lover. He mistakes for Malavika to be his lover, who has been giving a couple of letter and phone calls, and falls in love with her. The movie continues as Bobby does various things to impress her.

Bobby, Govind and Asokan are students and they stay together with Ujvalan, their cook. Vandana and Malavika are their college mates. Vandana likes Bobby but she does not reveal it to him and makes anonymous calls and sends cards. But Bobby misunderstands Malavika to be his secret lover and to find out the truth Bobby dresses as a girl Srilakshmi and enters Malavika's hostel. He succeeds in sharing a room with Malavika and soon they become friends. Malavika takes Lakshmi home and introduces her to brother Prakash. Lakshmi starts telling Malavika about Bobby and soon she falls in love with him. But all plans go haywire at a fashion parade where Bobby is exposed. Suresh Gopi who is the chief guest at the function intervenes and all problems are sorted out.

== Cast ==
- Krishna as Bobby/Sreelakshmi-fake lady get-up (Dubbed by Nandakumar for Bobby and Suma Scaria for Sreelekshmi)
- Jomol as Malavika
- Kaveri as Vandana (Dubbed by Bhagyalakshmi)
- Kalabhavan Navas as Govindan
- Jagathy Sreekumar as Ujjwal
- Harishree Ashokan as Balakrishnan
- Baiju Santhosh
- Jagadish as K. P. Omanakuttan
- Kaviyoor Renuka as Saroja Menon
- Suresh Gopi as himself (Cameo Appearance)
- Mukesh as Commissioner Balachandran IPS (Cameo)
- Madhavi Chandra as dancer (Cameo)
- Kunchacko Boban as Singer Vijay Varma (Cameo Appearance)
- Saju Kodiyan as The Priest
- Shaju Sreedhar
- Dr. Shaju

== Reception ==
A critic from Sify wrote that "The script and screenplay by Vinu Kiriyath are stale".
