= Rishyasringan =

- Directed by: Suresh Unnithan
- Screenplay by: Rajesh Narayanan
- Story by: Dililal
- Produced by: D. Dililal, Chakka Rajan
- Starring: Bhanupriya; Krishna
- Cinematography: Ramachandra Babu
- Edited by: G. Murali
- Music by: Johnson; Rajamani (Score)
- Distributed by: Guruchitra Films
- Release date: 1997
- Country: India
- Language: Malayalam

Rishyasringan is a 1997 Indian Malayalam film directed by Suresh Unnithan and starring Bhanupriya and Krishna in the lead roles.

== Cast ==
- Bhanupriya as Poornima
- Krishna as Arun
- Thilakan
- Nedumudi Venu
- Janagaraj
- Indrans
- Chitra
- Sukumari

== Soundtrack ==
Rishyasringan

Soundtrack album by Johnson
- Released: 1997
- Genre: Film
- Language: Malayalam
- Label: Aakash Audios; Johny Sagariga; T-Series; Manorama Music; Millennium Audios

The film features songs composed by Johnson and written by S. Ramesan Nair.

No.	Song title	Singer
1	"Vibhavari Raagam"	K. J. Yesudas, Sujatha Mohan
2	"Kaakaa Kalli"	K. S. Chithra
3	"Omanathinkal Paadiya"	K. J. Yesudas
4	"Snehavalsalyame"	G. Venugopal
5	"Om Gam Ganapathaye"	Chorus
6	"Kozhippoovante"	C. O. Anto, Johnson, Natesh Shankar
7	"Guru Brahma"	Sujatha Mohan
8	"Karthika Deepam"	K. S. Chithra
9	"Koohu Kunju"	K. J. Yesudas
