= Kinnaram Cholli Cholli =

2001 film by V. Murali

- Directed by: V. Murali
- Written by: V. Murali; R. Thyagarajan (dialogues)
- Screenplay by: V. Murali
- Produced by: T. Srinivasan; A. R. M. Mohan
- Starring: Sindhu; David Das; Geetha; Meenu Kumar
- Cinematography: M. Venkitesh
- Edited by: D. S. R. Subash
- Music by: S. P. Venkatesh
- Production company: Annamalai Films
- Distributed by: Annamalai Films
- Release date: 2001
- Country: India
- Language: Malayalam

Kinnaram Cholli Cholli is a 2001 Indian Malayalam film, directed by V. Murali and produced by T. Srinivasan and A. R. M. Mohan. The film stars Sindhu, David Das, Geetha and Meenu Kumar in lead roles. The film had musical score by S. P. Venkatesh.

== Cast ==
- Sindhu
- David Das
- Geetha
- Meenu Kumar
- Shakeela
- Stephen

kamal
