= Niram =

- DVD cover
- Directed by: Kamal
- Screenplay by: Shathrughnan
- Story by: Iqbal Kuttippuram
- Produced by: K. Radhakrishnan
- Starring: Kunchacko Boban; Shalini; Jomol; Boban Alummoodan
- Cinematography: P. Sukumar
- Edited by: K. Rajagopal
- Music by: Vidyasagar
- Production company: Jayalakshmi Films
- Distributed by: Johny Sagarika Release
- Release date: 16 September 1999
- Running time: 170 minutes
- Country: India
- Language: Malayalam
- Box office: ₹5 crore

Niram (English: Colour) is a 1999 Indian Malayalam-language romantic comedy film directed by Kamal and written by Sathrughnan, inspired by a story by Iqbal Kuttippuram. Niram marks the fourth and final collaboration of the leading pair, Kunchacko and Shalini of the late 90s. It was also Shalini's last Malayalam film, before retiring from the industry. The film revolves around the relationship of two teenagers - Aby (Kunchacko Boban) and Sona (Shalini), who are best friends since childhood and often hang out together. The film's music was composed by Vidyasagar. Niram was a blockbuster at the box office, becoming one of the highest-grossing Malayalam films of the year, grossing over ₹5 crore. The film was remade in Telugu as Nuvve Kavali (2000), Tamil as Piriyadha Varam Vendum (2001) with Director Kamal, and actresses Shalini, Jomol and Kovai Sarala reprising their roles, in Kannada as Ninagagi (2002), and in Hindi as Tujhe Meri Kasam (2003). The film was rereleased on 16 September 1999.

== Plot ==
Aby and Sona are neighbors and family friends. They share a special friendship but romance is not in the plan. They are a pair of fun-loving pranksters always up for mischief.

The story takes a turn when Sona goes to Bangalore to participate in a youth festival. Aby misses her so much that he realizes that what he feels for her is more than friendship. He is all set to confess his love when he realizes that he doesn't know how she feels about him, and he feels that he should not take undue advantage of the freedom their parents have given them. When Sona returns, she tells Aby about Prakash Mathew, who proposed to her when they were in Bangalore.

Sona, who is confused about her feelings for Prakash, confides in Aby, who encourages her to confess her feelings to Prakash. Sona and Prakash become a couple but this brings unexpected strain into Aby and Sona's friendship. Prakash's reactions to Aby's closeness to Sona makes Aby realize that things will never be the same again. Aby, realizing that Sona is hurt by Prakash's actions towards him, starts showing interest in Varsha, who has always been in love with Aby. Aby infuriates Sona by avoiding her and spending more time with Varsha.

Meanwhile, Prakash and Sona's marriage is fixed. Varsha asks Aby to meet her father, but he does not turn up for the meeting, giving excuses. Varsha later tells him that she realizes that he loves Sona and as long as that is the case, he would never reciprocate her feelings and it is best to tell Sona the truth.

Arrangements started for Sona's marriage to Prakash. After a dinner where the families of Aby, Sona and Aby discuss marriage, Sona realizes that she will be moving to the US, away from her parents and Aby . She gets emotional and asks him why he never loved her, then everything would have been perfect! Aby gets overwhelmed by emotions and hugs her. He apologizes and leaves immediately. Sona is shocked at the extent of his feelings. She goes to his house and finds a card in which he has written SUK-RI-YA (which in the movie means "I love you") near her name. Sona is hurt and gets angry at Aby for having hidden so many things from her. She finally tells him that she loves him too. Aby tries to pacify her and make her understand that it would be inappropriate to tell their parents at this stage.

Sona gets engaged to Prakash and Aby decides to leave before the wedding. Their parents are baffled at his sudden decision to leave and try to dissuade him. Aby is adamant and Sona goes to leave him to the railway station. Their parents find out that they are in love and come in search of them, to find the pair sitting on the stairs of the station, Aby not having left. Their parents happily suggest that the duo get married because they also have wished for them to forever stay together.

== Cast ==
- Kunchacko Boban as Aby
- Shalini as Sona
- Jomol as Varsha alias world bank
- Lalu Alex as Dr. Sunny, Aby's father
- Devan as Er. Jacob / Job, Sona's father
- Ambika as Dr. Baby, Aby's mother
- Bindu Panicker as Maya, Sona's mother
- Boban Alummoodan as Prakash Mathew
- Babu Swamy as Colonel Uncle
- Kovai Sarala as Rukku, Aby's maid
- KPAC Lalitha as Annamma, Prakash's grandmother
- Prem Prakash as Mathukutty, Prakash's father
- Ponnamma Babu as Prakash's mother
- Rizabawa as Jinan (cameo appearance)
- Divya Unni as herself (cameo appearance)
- Zainuddin as college drama director
- Jijoy Rajagopal as Bhavesh
- Kaviraj Achari as Friend of Aby

== Soundtrack ==
All music is composed by Vidyasagar.

No.	Title	Lyrics	Artist(s)	Length
1.	"Minnithennum Nakshathrangal"	Gireesh Puthenchery	K. J. Yesudas, K. S. Chithra
2.	"Mizhiyariyaathe"	Bichu Thirumala	Sujatha Mohan
3.	"Mizhiyariyaathe"	Bichu Thirumala	K. J. Yesudas
4.	"Prayam Nammil"	Bichu Thirumala	P. Jayachandran, Sujatha Mohan
5.	"Shukriya Shukriya ("Oru Chik Chik Chik Chik Chirakil")"	Gireesh Puthenchery	K. J. Yesudas, Shabnam
6.	"Shukriya Shukriya ("Oru Chik Chik Chik Chik Chirakil")"	Gireesh Puthenchery	Vidhu Prathap, Shabnam
7.	"Yaathrayaay"	Gireesh Puthenchery	K. J. Yesudas, K. S. Chithra, Vidyasagar

== Reception ==
A critic from Deccan Herald wrote that "If you are in an upbeat mood, this one's worth watching and if you are feeling the blues, perhaps the movie will do you good, too". A critic from Sify wrote that "The film is a 'must see' for teenagers and those in love because the director has woven together a fine screenplay and got the lead players to give a very natural performance".

== Box office ==
The movie was a commercial success, and it made a theatrical run of more than 150 days due to positive reviews. The film collected over ₹5 crore at the box office.
