= Manthrikumaran =

- Directed by: Thulasidas
- Written by: Suresh Poduval
- Produced by: Dr Rajan Dennis, Ravi P Dennis
- Cinematography: Saloo George
- Edited by: G Murali
- Music by: Mohan Sithara
- Production company: Dennis Brothers
- Release date: 1998
- Country: India
- Language: Malayalam

Manthrikumaran is a 1998 Indian Malayalam language film directed by Thulasidas, starring Mukesh and Sangita in the lead roles.

== Plot ==
Achuthankutty wants to become a bank manager and thinks highly of himself. His father Pothuval brings a marriage proposal for him with Aswathi. She is a nurse and for that reason Achuthankutty insults her without seeing her before her father. He gets a job as peon in the same town where Aswathi works. Achuthankutty's superior is Sunderashan. Sunderashan is fed up with his feminist and arrogant wife Chandrika and they fight. Chandrika and Aswathy are friends and they find out about Achuthankutty.

Chandrika tells Aswathy that she should take revenge on Achuthankutty. They trick him into believing that she is an air hostess. Chandrika makes Achuthankutty fall for the trick and he himself introduces to her as a bank manager and marries her. Aswathi has now thrown her life for revenge and Achuthankutty on a fool's paradise. But soon the lies begin to peel off and Achutankutty goes to extreme ends to meet his primary goal, but later he understands what life and married life should be and comes back to Aswathy after an arduous period of despicable games.

== Cast ==
- Mukesh as Achuthankutty
- Sangita as Aswathy
- Jagadeesh as Ramanan
- Jagathy Sreekumar as Sundareshan
- Innocent as Adv. Bahuleyan
- KPAC Lalitha as Chandrika Sundareshan
- Chandni Shaju as Sreekutty
- Oduvil Unnikrishnan as Pothuval
- Bobby Kottarakkara as Raghu
- K. T. S. Padannayil as grandfather
- Kaviyoor Renuka as Janaki
- M. R. Gopakumar as Ravunni
- Poojappura Radhakrishnan as Postman
- Sadiq as Raghavan
- Madhupal as Sarath (Cameo Appearance)
- Anila Sreekumar as Subadra
- Rajith Kumar as Bank Employee
- Sindhu as Malavika

== Soundtrack ==
The soundtrack album was composed by Mohan Sithara and the lyrics were written by Bharanikkavu Sivakumar & S. Ramesan Nair.

Track	Song title	Singer(s)
1	Thingalppoo Virinjuvo V1	Mohan Sithara, Biju Narayanan, K. S. Chithra
2	Thingalppoo Virinjuvo V2	Mohan Sithara, K. S. Chithra
3	Thingalppoo Virinjuvo V3	Mohan Sithara, Biju Narayanan
4	Kilukile Vala Kilungave	K. S. Chithra
5	Pongi Pongi Pokanam	M. G. Sreekumar
6	Kala Kala Kalamozhi	Mano
