= Vaadaka Gunda =

- Directed by: Gandhikuttan
- Written by: M. P. Rajeevan
- Screenplay by: M. P. Rajeevan
- Produced by: Vaikkam Mani
- Starring: Jagathy Sreekumar; Suresh Gopi; Vaikkam Mani; Captain Raju
- Cinematography: V. Karunakaran
- Edited by: N. Gopalakrishnan
- Music by: Perumbavoor G. Ravindranath
- Production company: Ragapoornima
- Distributed by: Ragapoornima
- Release date: 17 March 1989
- Country: India
- Language: Malayalam

Vaadaka Gunda is a 1989 Indian Malayalam film, directed by Gandhikuttan and produced by Vaikkam Mani. The film stars Jagathy Sreekumar, Suresh Gopi, Vaikkam Mani and Captain Raju in the lead roles. The film has musical score by Perumbavoor G. Ravindranath.

== Cast ==
- Jagathy Sreekumar
- Suresh Gopi
- Vaikkam Mani
- Captain Raju
- Bindya
- Disco Shanti
- Kollam Ajith
- M. G. Soman
- Poojappura Ravi
- Vembayam Thampi
- Jayalalita

== Soundtrack ==
The music was composed by Perumbavoor G. Ravindranath and the lyrics were written by Sreekumaran Thampi.

No.	Song	Singers	Lyrics	Length (m:ss)
1	"Aarum Paadaatha"	Minmini	Sreekumaran Thampi	
2	"Channam Pinnam"	K. J. Yesudas, Minmini	Sreekumaran Thampi	
3	"Neyyaandi Melam"	Music Beats		
