= Thuppariyum Sambu =

Detective short-story series in Tamil

Thuppariyum Sambu is a detective short-story series in Tamil, written by Indian writer Devan in the early 20th century. The novel's protagonist is Sambu, a not-very-intelligent bank clerk in middle age, who solves difficult crime puzzles out of serendipity but is quick to explain as well as take credit. Sambu's character is sometimes considered to be a comical version of Sherlock Holmes.

The stories are known for their distinctive humor set around contemporary society and eloquently portray the conditions of the modern city of Chennai during the 1920s, 1930s and 1940s period. Some of the episodes carry subtle references to World War II as well.

== Etymology ==
The prefix Thuppariyum comes from the Tamil thuppu = clue and ari = know (yum denotes present participle).

== Sambu and other characters ==
Sambu is described by Devan as having a bald fringe, a prominent nose and a weak chin. Along with a generally bewildered stare his appearance invariably invites people to term him asadu (stupid), an assessment not far from the mark. This becomes an asset for Sambu as criminals often underestimate him. Even though Sambu displays a certain reasoning and cunning, it is Lady Luck who leads him to literally stumble on the truth. A typical Sambu story has him clutch a newly built window railing as he trips over some obstacle, and some stolen diamonds hidden in the cement by a mason come to light. The drama is maintained by Sambu triumphing over people who have previously laughed or ridiculed him, with Sambu often being the last to understand that he has actually solved the crime.

Sambu's stalwart companion in the police force is Inspector Gopalan, who usually brings a case to the detective's attention. Sambu and Gopalan usually have great regard for each other save for occasional irritants in their relations caused by Sambu's thin skin. Sambu eventually marries Vembu, who is clearly smarter than her husband and spares no criticism of her husband's vacuousness. The two eventually have a son called Sundhu who also helps in his father's work in solving crimes.

Sambu's detective career is launched when the Director of the bank where he works fires him for letting a corrupt bank manager escape. Sambu gets sweet revenge when the same Director eventually summons him to recover a lost pearl necklace. In another story Sambu traps the same corrupt manager who used to take great pleasure in referring to him at work as "that idiot". Sambu's best moments are when he walks into his old office on the case of the pearl necklace and haughtily ignores his former colleagues who once showed him scant respect.

== Adaptations ==
In the late 1980s Thuppariyum Sambu was made into a popular TV serial with Kathadi Ramamurthy as Sambu and Delhi Ganesh as the Inspector. In one of the last episodes Sambu visits London and meets with Scotland Yard sleuths and solves a crime for them, too, and on his return from the UK, he is heartily welcomed. His wife also delivers their daughter.

In early 1990s, Thuupariyum Sambu was made into a TV serial with Y. G. Mahendra as Sambu and A. R. Srinivasan as the inspector Gopalan.

The concept was also adapted into comics form created by Gopulu in Ananda Vikatan.

Shikari Shambu, a forest ranger character created by India Book House for their Tinkle series, is loosely based on Thuppariyum Shambu. Besides the name, Shikari Shambu borrows the concept where lady luck plays a key role in helping Shikari in many an adventure.
