= College Kumaran =

- Theatrical Film Poster
- Directed by: Thulasidas
- Written by: Suresh Poduval
- Produced by: Bency Martin
- Starring: Mohanlal; Siddique; Balachandra Menon; Vimala Raman
- Cinematography: Venugopal
- Edited by: P. C. Mohanan
- Music by: Ouseppachan
- Production company: Fairy Queen Production's
- Release date: 31 January 2008
- Running time: 155 minutes
- Country: India
- Language: Malayalam

College Kumaran is a 2008 Malayalam language action film directed by Thulasidas, written by Suresh Poduval starring Mohanlal, Siddique, Balachandra Menon and Vimala Raman.

== Plot ==
Captain Sreekumar alias Kumaran is the star of Mahatma college before he joined the army. Now as an ex-military officer, Kumaran is running the canteen of Mahatma College after a tragic incident that took his father's and sister's life. Kumaran is dear to all the students and he actively engages with them, whether in youth festivals, love affairs, fights, or campus tours. He even helps them bring teachers back from their private tuition classes to the college.

Madhavi, the college's English professor, hates him because she saw Kumaran getting involved in a fight with a street rowdy and making her to come late on her joining day. Once during a campus tour, the bus gets involved in an accident, killing several students. Madhavi tells everyone that Kumaran was the reason for the accident. Later Madhavi realizes that Kumaran is the one who helped her to achieve her this position of an English teacher by remitting the amount required after she became orphan.

It is also revealed by Kumaran that ex-education minister Sethunathan, who after thrown out from power, decided to destroy the faith on Kumaran from both the management and the students. So Sethunathan planned the bus accident and put the blame on Kumaran. Kumaran even reveals that the incident that happened to his father and sister was well planned by Sethunathan as his father witnessed Sethunathan sexually harassing a girl in the college canteen and he planned to report it to the management. So Sethunathan killed Kumaran's father and sister with the help of the watchman Vasooty and made it as an accident. After revealing the truth, the students tries to kill Sethunathan but he takes a gun and threatens to kill them if they come forward. Kumaran overpowers Sethunathan and defeats him. As he was about to kill Sethunathan, he stops as it was a college and leaves him.

After proving his innocence, Kumaran plans to go back but the college principal, college manager and Madhavi's uncle tells him to not go and they need him to take care of the college as the next college manager. Kumaran tells that he will be in the college as College Kumaran.

== Cast ==
- Mohanlal as Canteen Kumaran / Captain Sreekumar
- Siddique as Educational Minister Sethunathan
- Balachandra Menon as Narayanan, Madhavi's uncle
- Janardhanan as V. Narendranath, College Principal
- Nedumudi Venu as Sivaraman Nair
- Suraj Venjaramoodu as Bhargavan, Kumaran's Aide
- Harisree Ashokan as Valsan, Kumaran's Aide
- Saiju Kurup as CI Raghu
- Vimala Raman as Madhavi Menon
- Sruthi Lakshmi as Radha, Kumaran's sister
- Vijayaraghavan as SI Issac George
- Babu Namboothiri as Karunakaran Nair, Kumaran's father
- Jagannatha Varma as Judge Pillai
- Kalasala Babu as Chandrasekharan, Public Prosecutor
- T. P. Madhavan as Vasooty / Vasudevan Muthalali
- Mukundan as Doctor Kasim Haji
- Rizabawa as Vikraman, Maths lecturer
- Baiju as Santhosh, Sethunathan's Party Person
- Suresh Krishna as Xavier Kurishinkal
- Adithya Menon as Kannappan
- Anil Murali
- Kochu Preman as Sudhakaran
- Prasanth Alexander as Aby
- Arun V. Narayan
- Murali Mohan
- Vimal Raj as Bike Baby
- Shamna Kasim as Sreekutty
- Manka Mahesh as Vidya, Sivaraman Nair's wife
- Valsala Menon as Lakshmi, Sivaraman Nair's mother
- Ambika Mohan as Deepa, College Lecturer
- KPAC Leelamani as Chithra, College Lecturer
- Suja Menon as Veena Warrier
- Sajitha Betti as Shalini
- Surya Mohan as Shalini's friend
- Bindu Murali as Hostel Matron
- Maya Moushmi as Lathika, Sethunathan's wife
- Chaya Govind as Indhu Udayakumar
- Jija Surendran as Parent

== Soundtrack ==
Music: Ouseppachan, Lyrics: Shibu Chakravarthy.

Song title	Singers	Raga(s)
"Kaanakkuyilin"	G. Venugopal	Kapi
"Kaanakkuyilin" (F)	Swetha Mohan	Kapi
"Snehathin Koodonnu"	Karthik, Aparna Rajesh	
"Thazhika Kudame"	M. G. Sreekumar, Jyotsna	
"Assistant Camera Man"	Rojesh M. T., Periyonkavala	

== Reception ==
Paresh C Palicha of Rediff.com said that "College Kumaran is just an average fare." IndiaGlitz says College KUmaran is "passable fare", but also says it "offers us excitement all through as we settle into our seats for the movie and the director has made it a point to keep the tempo sustained with little bit of twists coming up in every twenty minutes."
