= Jomol =

Indian actress

- Born: Jomol John; Kodenchery, Kozhikode, Kerala
- Occupations: Actress; dancer; dubbing artist
- Years active: 1989–present
- Spouse: Chandrashekar Pillai (m. 2002)
- Children: 2

Jomol, also known as Gauri, is an Indian actress who predominantly appeared in Malayalam films. She started her career as a child artist, then became a lead actress in the mid-90s.

== Career ==
Jomol is an Indian actress who appeared in Malayalam films. She has had major roles in films like Niram, Piriyadha Varam Vendum and Deepasthambham Mahascharyam. She won the Kerala State Film Award for Best Actress and National Film Award - Special Mention for her role in Ennu Swantham Janakikutty (1996).

In 1997, she won the Kerala State Film Award for best actress for her role in Ennu Swantham Janakikutty and also a special jury mention from the National Film Awards. She gave voice to Jyothika in the Malayalam Film Kaathal – The Core.

== Personal life ==
Jomol was married to Chandrashekar Pillai in 2002. She then converted to Hinduism and adopted the name Gauri. The couple have two daughters, Aarya Pillai and Aarja Pillai.

== Filmography ==
=== Films ===
Year	Film	Role	Notes	Ref.
1989	Oru Vadakkan Veeragatha	Young Unniyarcha	Child actor	
1989	Anagha	Meera	Child actor	
1992	My Dear Muthachan	Maya	Child actor	
1998	Sneham	Manikutty		
1998	Punjabi House	Sujatha		
1998	Mayilpeelikkavu	Gayathri/ Kuttimani		
1998	Ennu Swantham Janakikutty	Janakikutty	National Film Award – Special Mention; Kerala State Film Award for Best Actress	
1998	Chitrashalabham	Deepa		
1999	Niram	Varsha		
1999	Ustaad	Zarina	Cameo appearance	
1999	Deepasthambham Mahascharyam	Indu		
2000	Arayannangalude Veedu	Suja		
2000	Snegithiye	Savithri	Tamil film	
2000	Melevaryathe Malakhakkuttikal	Gopika Variyar		
2000	Sayahnam	Volga		
2001	Piriyadha Varam Vendum	Sneha	Tamil film	
2002	Thilakam	Geetha		
2002	Puthooramputhri Unniyarcha	Kanni		
2003	Thillana Thillana	Malavika		
2007	Raakilipattu	Savithri		
2017	Careful	Suja		
2024	Jai Ganesh	Adv. Parvathy Marar		

=== As a Dubbing Artist ===
Year	Artist	Film
2023	Jyothika	Kaathal - The Core

=== Television ===
Year	Title	Role	Channel	Notes
2001	Onasadya	Host	Kairali TV	
2001	Onavisheshangalumayee	Host	Surya TV	
2005	Ellam Mayajalam	Manasa	Asianet	TV debut
2005-2006	Sahadharmini	Thamara	Asianet	
2006-2007	Koodevide	Manasa	Surya TV	
2012	Achante Makkal	Vaiga IPS	Surya TV	
2016-2017	Malayali Veetamma	Judge	Flowers (TV channel)	Reality show
2016	Thararuchi	Celebrity presenter	Mazhavil Manorama	Cookery show
2018	Thrayambakam	Dancer	Asianet	
2018	Sthree Sakthi	Dancer/Indulekha	Asianet News	
2019	Comedy star season 2	Judge	Asianet	Reality show
2022	Red Carpet	Mentor	Amrita TV	
2022	Star Magic	Mentor	Flowers (TV channel)	
2022	Bzinga Family Festival	Mentor	Zee Keralam	

Other shows as Guest

- Onnum Onnum Moonu
- JB Junction
- Varthakkappuram
- Jomolude Suvisheshangal
- Vanitha
- Thiranottam
- Katha Ithuvare
- Chat with Jomol
- I Personally
- Veettamma
- Comedy Super Nite

Performances

- Alukkas Fairy Tale
