= Aagraham (1984 film) =

- Directed by: Rajasenan
- Written by: Thulasidas; Rajasenan (dialogues)
- Screenplay by: Rajasenan
- Produced by: V. Rajan
- Starring: Menaka; Devan; Adoor Bhasi; Shubha
- Cinematography: P. N. Sundaram
- Edited by: N. P. Suresh
- Music by: A. T. Ummer
- Production company: Gireesh Pictures
- Distributed by: Gireesh Pictures
- Release date: 4 May 1984
- Country: India
- Language: Malayalam

Aagraham is a 1984 Indian Malayalam-language film directed by Rajasenan and produced by V. Rajan. The film stars Menaka, Devan, Adoor Bhasi and Shubha in the lead roles. The film has musical score by A. T. Ummer.

== Cast ==
- Menaka
- Devan
- Adoor Bhasi
- Shubha
- Kanakalatha
- Kuthiravattam Pappu
- Lalu Alex
- M. G. Soman
- Ragini
- T. G. Ravi

== Soundtrack ==
The music was composed by A. T. Ummer and the lyrics were written by Poovachal Khader.

No.	Song	Singers	Lyrics	Length (m:ss)
1	"Aagraham Oreyoraagram"	K. J. Yesudas, P. Susheela	Poovachal Khader	
2	"Bhoopaalam Paadaatha"	K. J. Yesudas	Poovachal Khader	
3	"Hridayashaarike"	K. J. Yesudas, Sujatha Mohan	Poovachal Khader	
4	"Saagaram Saptha Swarasaagaram"	K. J. Yesudas	Poovachal Khader	
