= Bharthavudyogam =

2001 film by Suresh Vinu

Bharthaavudyogam
- Directed by: Suresh Vinu
- Written by: P.Suresh Kumar
- Screenplay by: P.Suresh Kumar
- Starring: Jagadish, Athira, Siddique, Jagathy Sreekumar
- Cinematography: Anil Nair
- Edited by: G.Murali
- Music by: M Jayachandran
- Release date: 28 December 2001
- Country: India
- Language: Malayalam

Bharthaavudyogam is a 2001 Indian Malayalam comedy drama film, directed by Suresh Vinu, starring Jagadish, Athira and Siddique in the lead roles. The film had a musical score composed by M Jayachandran.

== Cast ==
- Jagadish as Unnikrishnan Namboothiri
- Athira as Uma Devi Antharjanam, Unnikrishnan's wife
- Siddique as Reji Menon, Umadevi's bank manager
- Salim Kumar as Pushpan, Unnikrishnan's neighbour
- Cochin Haneefa as SI Minnal Prathapan
- Jagathy Sreekumar as Mathachan, Bank peon
- Bindu Panikkar as Mohini, Pushpan's wife
- Kalabhavan Mani as B.B.C Ramji
- Devi Chandana as Shilpa, Reji Menon's cousin
- Ponnamma Babu as Sulochana, Minnal Prathapan's wife
- Indrans as Madhavan/Unnikrishnan's friend
- Suma Jayaram as Stella, Bank staff
- Geetha Salam as Kammath, Assistant bank manager
- M. S Thrippunithura as Reji Menon's father
- Paravoor Bharathan as Kaimal
- Kozhikode Narayanan Nair
- Machan Varghese as Varkkey

== Soundtrack ==
- "Kanikaanum Thaaram" – written by S. Rameshan Nair, performed by M.G. Sreekumar and Sujatha Mohan
- "Poomakale Poothinkale" – G. Venugopal
