= Deepasthambham Mahascharyam =

- Directed by: K. B. Madhu
- Written by: Suresh Poduval
- Produced by: Salim Sathar
- Starring: Dileep; Jomol; Sangeetha; Jagathi Sreekumar
- Cinematography: P. Sukumar
- Edited by: G. Murali
- Music by: Mohan Sitara
- Release date: July 30, 1999
- Country: India
- Language: Malayalam

Deepasthambham Mahascharyam is a 1999 Malayalam film directed by K. B. Madhu and starring Dileep as an Ottamthullal dancer who is caught in a love triangle with two girls, played by Jomol and Sangeetha.

== Plot ==
Mundoor Ramanandan Nambiar is an Ottamthullal dancer who is struggling to make a living. Once he was hired by a rich man to perform for a week-long function. His daughter Priya falls in love with him but she understands that Mundoor is already in love with Indu.

== Cast ==
- Dileep as Mundoor Ramanandan Nambiar
- Jomol as Indu
- Sangeetha as Priya
- Jagathy Sreekumar as Nalpamaram Nambeeshan, Ramandan's friend
- Harisree Asokan as Kalamandalam Aliyar
- Rajan P. Dev as Nambiar, Indu's father
- Oduvil Unnikrishnan as Govinda Varma Raja
- Salu Kuttanadu as Kalamandalam Sugreevan
- Kaviyoor Renuka as Madhavi
- Jagadish as Susheelan
- C. I. Paul as Madhavan
- Madhupal as Dinesh
- Mamukkoya as Saithali

== Reception ==
The film received mixed to positive and negative reviews from critics and audiences all over Kerala. The film was not commercially successful. The songs however were hits.

== Soundtrack ==
Deepasthambham Mahascharyam

Soundtrack album by Mohan Sithara
- Released: 8 April 1999
- Genre: Feature film soundtrack
- Label: Satyam Audios

The songs were composed by Mohan Sithara, with lyrics by Yusufali Kechery. The soundtrack was the first released under the Sathyam Audios label.

Song title	Singer(s)
"Ente Ulludukkum"	K. J. Yesudas, Radhika Thilak
"Kalavaani"	K. J. Yesudas
"Ninte Kannil"	K. J. Yesudas
"Ninte Kannil"	Radhika Thilak
"Pranayakadha"; Raga: Abheri	Mohan Sithara
"Sindoora Sandhye"	K. J. Yesudas
"Sindoora Sandhye"	K. S. Chithra
"Snehathin Poo"	K. S. Chithra

== Awards ==
- Asianet Film Award for Best Lyricist - Yusuf Ali Kechery
