= Sasanam =

- Title card
- Directed by: Mahendran
- Written by: Mahendran
- Starring: Arvind Swamy; Gautami; Ranjitha
- Cinematography: K. P. Nambiathiri; Murali
- Edited by: B. Lenin; V. T. Vijayan
- Music by: Balabarathi
- Production company: National Film Development Corporation of India
- Release date: 28 July 2006
- Running time: 141 minutes
- Country: India
- Language: Tamil

Sasanam (transl. The Will) is a 2006 Indian Tamil-language film written and directed by Mahendran. The film, based on the short story of the same name by Gandharvan, stars Arvind Swamy, Gautami and Ranjitha, while Balabharathi composed the music and K. P. Nambiathiri handled the cinematography.

The film began production in the mid-1990s but was released in 2006 due to production trouble, with all three of the lead actors retired at the time of release.

== Plot ==
Muthiah and his wife Visalakshi are a loving couple, and they come across Saroji who with no one to go to, takes refuge in Muthiah's house. Muthiah and Saroji develop soft spots towards each other. The rest is what transpires between the trio, exploring the nuances of an extra-marital affair.

== Cast ==
- Aravinthsamy as Muthaiya (Ramanathan)
- Gowthami as Visalakshi
- Ranjitha as Sarojini
- Thalaivasal Vijay
- Sabitha Anand
- Rathan Mouli
- Vellai Subbaiah
- Sujitha

== Production ==
My film deals with the unwritten laws and codes which I feel are more meaningful to a life than the written ones. Like love, gratitude, respect.

— Mahendran, on the meaning of the film's title

When Mahendran attended film festivals, he met foreigners who requested him to make a film on Tamil Nadu culture instead of taking inspiration from world cinema. This led Mahendran to make a film on Nagarathar culture of Karaikudi for which he researched them for three years and the film was an adaptation of the short story of same name written by Gandharvan. The film was majorly shot at a house at Kandanur at Karaikudi.

The film began production in the mid-1990s and Balabharathi composed the music while Lenin and Vijayan were signed on as editors. Former State Assembly Speaker and senior AIADMK leader K. Kalimuthu penned a song for the film which was sung by Chithra, Sriram and Sathyanarayana. By January 1999, the film was described to be ready for release and Mahendran moved on to work on other projects.

By 2000, the film was referred to as "delayed, believed dead" by the media, with reporters suggesting that changes in Gouthami's physique since signing the film would hinder any chances of completion. During production, the film's budget became overrun so Mahendran approached the National Film Development Corporation (NFDC) to take over the financing of the film in 2000. To avoid the film being delayed further due to financial problems, the lead actor Arvind Swamy opted against receiving any salary. The film later finally released on 29 July 2006.

== Soundtrack ==
Soundtrack was composed by Balabharathi.

Track listing
No.	Title	Singer(s)	Length
1.	"Pudhiya Kalai"	Sriram, K. S. Chithra
2.	"Aasaigalai Nenjukulle"	Malaysia Vasudevan
3.	"Poove Nee"	K. S. Chithra
4.	"Vaazhkayin Vaasal"	K. S. Chithra

== Reception ==
A reviewer from Sify said that the film "tugs your heart strings, striking the right chord though a bit slow and old fashioned in shot compositions and presentation". Lajjavathi of Kalki felt the director needs four scenes to make a point and what kind of screenplay strategy is this? The scenes should have been recorded with sharper dialogues and also felt music makes us the whole film tired while panning Gauthami's characterisation and Ranjitha's dance, she however praised Marudhu's art direction and Aravind Swamy's acting and concluded calling it thirst quencher of art lovers. Cinesouth wrote, "If the first half of the film did not progress at a slow tempo usual of serious subjects, it would have held the interest of even a frivolous film fan who favors peppy dance numbers more. Well, this happens to be an NFDC film, so…".

Malini Mannath of Chennai Online wrote "Mahendran's earlier films like 'Utharipookkal' and 'Mullum Malaraum' have earned him critical acclaim and commercial success. They were crafted with a lot of sensitivity, sensibility and insight, with the characters finely etched, the situations having a realistic touch to them. The writer-director had returned after a gap of long years (his 12th film), the film had been nearly a decade in the making, and it had taken some more years to hit the theatres. But, unfortunately, the factors and elements that made his films such engaging experiences are missing here. It's like the director has lost his touch". Malathi Rangarajan of The Hindu wrote, "`Saasanam' may not go down well with those who dig the commercial format, which has unrealistic heroism at its helm. But it is only when natural, down-to-earth attempts are encouraged, can our cinema move forward".

The film was later shown during the 7th annual film festival of India at Atlanta from 21 August 2009.
