= Piriyadha Varam Vendum =

2001 film directed by Kamal

- VCD cover
- Directed by: Kamal
- Written by: Perarasu (dialogues)
- Story by: Iqbal Kuttippuram
- Based on: Niram (Malayalam)
- Produced by: Nekhela Enterprises
- Starring: Prashanth; Shalini; Jomol; Krishna
- Cinematography: P. Sukumar
- Edited by: K. Rajagopal
- Music by: S. A. Rajkumar
- Production company: Nekhela Enterprises
- Release date: 16 February 2001
- Country: India
- Language: Tamil

Piriyadha Varam Vendum (transl. Want a boon to not separate) is a 2001 Indian Tamil-language romantic comedy film written and directed by Kamal. A remake of his own Malayalam film Niram (1999), the film stars Prashanth, Shalini, Jomol, and Krishna with an ensemble cast including Manivannan, Janagaraj, Ambika, Manorama, and Kovai Sarala. Shalini, Jomol, and Sarala reprise their roles from the original film. The music was composed by S. A. Rajkumar with cinematography by P. Sukumar and editing by K. Rajagopal. The film released on 16 February 2001 and became a commercial success. This was Shalini's final film role before her retirement from the film industry.

== Plot ==
Sanjay and Nithi have been best friends right from their childhood days. They have grown up together, attend the same college, and spend every minute of their waking hours together. Both have admirers in college with Sneha wooing Sanjay and Praveen Raj revealing his love for Nithi. Nithi's week-long trip to Bangalore, along with some prodding by his housemaid, makes Sanjay realize how much he misses Nithi and that he is in love with her. But respect for their friendship and her makes him hide his feelings. Meanwhile, Nithi accepts Praveen's proposal, and things quickly move towards their marriage. But when things come together, Nithi realizes that she cannot stay without Sanjay, and at that time he reveals that he too loves her.

== Cast ==
- Prashanth as Sanjay (Sanju)
- Shalini as Nithiyakalyani (Nithi)
- Jomol as Sneha
- Krishna as Praveen Raj
- Manivannan as Dhanasekaran
- Nizhalgal Ravi as Vishwanathan
- Ambika as Nithi's mother
- Ashwini as Pushpa
- Manorama as Azhagi
- Kovai Sarala as Kannatha
- Dhamu as Sanjay's friend
- Janagaraj as Kannatha's neighbor
- Charle as Sanjay's friend
- Vaiyapuri as Sanjay's friend
- Balaji as Sanjay's friend
- Chaplin Balu as Sanjay's friend
- Mink Brar in an item number

== Production ==
Following Niram, the film's director Kamal chose to make his debut in Tamil films by remaking it. Initially titled Kadhal Neethana, he signed up Prashanth to play the lead role, while Shalini retained the leading female role after agreeing to work on it on stage at the success function of Niram. The makers approached Devayani to play a second lead role, but she turned down the offer. Sneha and newcomer Krishna were then signed up to play the second leads for the film, while it was reported that Kushboo would also play a pivotal role. Sneha was later replaced by Jomol, who had played the role in the original version of the film, and Kushboo did not feature.

Delays in production due to the producer's financial problems meant that the dates of the lead pair went awry, and they were unable to come together to finish the shoot quickly. Prashanth chose to prioritize making his other film Appu as he had to sport a beard, and thus, Shalini was left waiting, although she had stated that she would not act again after her impending marriage. Shalini subsequently married actor Ajith Kumar, and the actor was unwilling to let his wife rejoin the team, stating that they had misused her dates. The team considered releasing the film in October 2000 using Shalini's scenes from the Malayalam version, while using graphics to edit out Kunchacko Boban and place in Prashanth, before Shalini readily agreed to feature. It subsequently became her final film before retirement.

Retitled as Piriyadha Varam Vendum, the film continued shooting in late 2000 with sequences including a song being filmed in Kochi with Mink Brar making a guest appearance. Owing to the earlier date problems, the team had shot the song "Vasco Da Gama" with guest dancer Raghava Lawrence, but Prashanth was not pleased about the sudden change of cast in the song and requested to re-shoot it at his own cost. The song was financed by Murali Manohar, while Prashanth's father Thiagarajan supervised the production of the song, which was guest directed by R. Madhesh and shot by Priyan, who had all volunteered.

== Soundtrack ==
Piriyadha Varam Vendum

Soundtrack album by S. A. Rajkumar
- Released: 2 January 2001
- Recorded: 2001
- Genre: Feature film soundtrack
- Length: 22:05
- Language: Tamil
- Labels: Saregama; Cee (I) TV Audio
- Producer: S. A. Rajkumar

The film score and the soundtrack were composed by S. A. Rajkumar. The soundtrack, released on 2 January 2001, features 5 tracks. Indiainfo wrote "Rajkumar and Vairamuthu, it seems, have done half-hearted work on the album".

No.	Title	Lyrics	Singer(s)	Length
1.	"Azhagu Ponnu"	Palani Bharathi	Anuradha Sriram, Devan, Krishnaraj, Jayanthi	4:10
2.	"Dikki Dikki Lona"	Pa. Vijay	Sujatha, Mano	4:31
3.	"Privondrai Santhithen"	Arivumathi	Hariharan	4:38
4.	"Vasco Da Gama"	Pa. Vijay	Devan, Sujatha	4:22
5.	"Vidaikodu Vidaikodu"	Palani Bharathi	P. Unnikrishnan, Swarnalatha	4:24

== Release and reception ==
The film's production delays had constantly led to the release being postponed from dates ranging from September 2000 til February 2001 and it consequently had an average run at the box office. Visual Dasan of Kalki wrote the first minus is that the screenplay has dragged a bit by trying to tell the closeness of friendship in the first half and the depth of love in the second half, another minus is characters speaking lengthy dialogues stretching and poor music. Chennai Online wrote "If Fazil gave a Kadhalukku Mariyadhai, Kamal has given Priyada Varam Vendum, about friendship, love and family values. A well-crafted screenplay, sensitive treatment and excellent performance from the lead pair, make it an eminently worthy film to watch." Cinesouth wrote "Kamal has directed the film without adding any spicy ingredient that is used in Tamil films. Tamil filmdom is in need of such capable directors. He has kept the suspense of the story throughout the film. The second half has a solid story base to the wonderment of all." Indiainfo wrote "A remake of the Malayalam hit Niram, the film is no doubt a fitting swan song for Shalini who has scored over everyone. While Prasanth tries hard to emote but fails but on the whole it's a watchable film even though it has shades of Kuch Kuch Hotha Hai".
