= Ennu Swantham Janakikutty =

1998 film by Hariharan

- Directed by: Hariharan
- Written by: M. T. Vasudevan Nair
- Produced by: P. V. Gangadharan
- Starring: Jomol; Chanchal
- Cinematography: Hari Nair
- Edited by: M. S. Mani
- Music by: Songs: Kaithapram Damodaran Namboothiri; Background Score: Sanjoy Chowdhury; Antara Chowdhury
- Distributed by: Kalpaka Films
- Release date: 1998
- Country: India
- Language: Malayalam

Ennu Swantham Janakikutty is a 1998 Malayalam movie, written by M. T. Vasudevan Nair and directed by Hariharan. The movie features Jomol in the lead role, where she won the National Film Special Jury Award. Also, K. Sampath won the National Film Award for Best Audiography for this film. The film is based on a story written by M. T. Vasudevan Nair named Cheriya Cheriya Bhookambangal. The movie was produced by P. V. Gangadharan under the banner of Gruhalakshmi Productions and was distributed by Kalpaka Release.

== Plot ==
The story revolves around Janakikutty, a ninth-grade student, and the challenges she faces in her everyday life. Janaki lives in a joint family, a Nair tharavadu, with her mother, brother, and sister. The other family in the house is her father's brother's wife and a daughter. Janaki's sister and cousin sister have no time for her as they are older than her. Her mother is a busy homemaker, frustrated by the continued absence of her husband from home as he works in the town. Janaki's only friend is an elderly grandmother and her neighbor, Bhaskaran, whom she secretly loves.

One day, Janakikutty and her grandmother collected herbs in a nearby forest, and she wandered off to the restricted area. Her grandmother warns her never to go there again because it is a haunted area. She narrates the legend behind it. Years ago, that area was once occupied by a newlywed Namboothiri couple. The wife, Kunjathol, discovers that her husband is a womanizer. When she confronts her husband, he murders her. Since then, Kunjathol, now a Yakshi, is believed to be residing in the area, along with her associate Karineeli, another Yakshi. To prove this story true, her grandmother narrated another story. Once, two men lost their way while attending a nearby festival. A young woman then approached them and asked if they could give her a few betel leaves to chew. To their horror, it was none other than Kunjathol herself who then killed them and drank their blood. Their bones were found the next day under a tree.

One day, Janakikutty comes across Bhaskaran and her cousin Sarojini, who are actually a couple. This upsets her, and she runs home in tears. However, she trips, sprains her leg, and falls to the ground. Suddenly, a voice calls out her name. She sees Kunjathol, a beautiful young woman, who comes towards her with a lovely smile and introduces herself and her aide, Karineeli. Janaki is terrified, but Kunjathol reassures her that some Yakshis are good people. She also says that since Janakikutty didn't commit any sin, she would instead like to befriend and protect her. Since then, Janakikutty and Kunjathol become best friends, and Janaki tells Kunjathol all about her life and travails. Kunjathol tells her she can deal with her mean relations if Janaki wishes.

In the meantime, Janakikutty's family is worried about her strange behavior. Occasionally, they see her conversing with herself or talking about Kunjathol as though she knows the Yakshi. When her cousin sisters are mean to her, Janaki asks Kunjathol to help her. Kunjathol throws stones into the sisters’ room in the night, terrifying them. The family thinks that the ghost of Kunjathol must be haunting their house. They conduct several rituals but to no avail.

Soon, Sarojini's marriage is fixed with a wealthy man against her will. Sarojini is heartbroken. Janakikutty decides to help her with Kunjathol's aid. However, Kunjathol refuses, saying everyone must live according to their destiny and that Sarojini's destiny is not to marry Bhaskaran. But to not disappoint Janakikutty, she agrees to attend the wedding from afar. But when she witnesses the marriage, it reminds her of her own unfortunate marriage that resulted in her cruel, untimely death. An enraged Kunjathol transforms into a fierce, vampiric form, frightening Janakikutty, who faints. Her family now thinks that they need to show her to an actual doctor, and she is admitted to a hospital. Bhaskaran volunteers to stay with her in the hospital, making her happy. She remembers Kunjathol's words that perhaps Sarojini is marrying someone else as it is her fate. She smiles, thinking that possibly Bhaskaran is destined to be hers.

Kunjathol sees Janakikutty for one last time in the hospital and then bids her goodbye, seeing that Bhaskaran now cares for her. At this point, Bhaskaran is completely aware of Janakikutty's feelings towards him and reciprocates her love.

== Cast ==
- Jomol as Janakikkutty
- Chanchal as Kunjathol
- Sarath Das as Bhaskaran
- Anoop as Kuttan, Janaki's elder brother
- Reshmi Soman as Sarojini
- Chakyar Rajan
- Valsala Menon as Janakikutty's grandmother
- Ponnamma Babu
- Shivaji

== Songs ==
The songs for this movie were written and composed by Kaithapram Damodaran Namboothiri. The BGM was provided by Anantha Chaudhari and Sanjay Choudhari.

No.	Song	Singer
1	"Paarvana Paalmazha"	K. S. Chithra
2	"Ambilipoovattam Ponnuruli"	K. J. Yesudas
3	"Chempakapoo Mottinullil Vasantham Vannu"	K. S. Chithra
4	"Ambilipoovattam Ponnuruli"	Sangeetha Sajith
5	"Innalathe Poonilavil"	Biju Narayanan
6	"Champakappoo Mottinullil"	K. J. Yesudas
7	"Then Thulumpumormayay"	K. J. Yesudas

== Awards ==
- National Film Award for Best Audiography - K. Sampath
- National Film Award – Special Jury Award / Special Mention (Feature Film) - Jomol
- Kerala State Film Award for Best Actress - Jomol
- Kerala State Film Award for Best Photography - Hari Nair
- Kerala State Film Award for Best Processing Lab - Prasad Colour Lab
