= Melevaryathe Malakhakkuttikal =

- Directed by: Thulasidas
- Screenplay by: Rajan Kiriyath
- Story by: Govind Padman
- Produced by: P. Sajithkumar
- Starring: Balachandra Menon; Geetha; Abhirami; Jomol
- Cinematography: KP Nambyathiri
- Edited by: Ranjan Abhraham
- Music by: Berny–Ignatius
- Production company: Pallavi International
- Release date: 23 June 2000
- Country: India
- Language: Malayalam

Melevaryathe Malakhakkuttikal (The Angels Above) is a 2000 Indian Malayalam-language film directed by Thulasidas, starring Balachandra Menon, Geetha, Abhirami and Jomol.

== Plot ==
In order to protect his family from his sexually abusive father, Sethumadhavan, in the guise of an elderly man, tries to protect the family.

== Cast ==
- Balachandra Menon as Sethumadhavan (Sethu)
- Geetha as Vasundara Devi
- Abhirami as Devika Warrier/Devu
- Jomol as Gopika Warrier/Gopu
- Krishna as Sarath
- KPAC Lalitha as Kunjukutti Warrasiyar
- Sajitha Betti as Malu/ Malavika Warrier
- Jagathy Sreekumar as Adv. K.K Warrier
- Harishree Ashokan as Parthdasaradhi
- Jose Pellissery as Josephettan
- M. S. Thripunithura as Ayyappan Menon, Magistrate
- Salim Kumar as Bhaskaran
- Anzil as Unni
- Swathy as Kunjumol
- Priyanka Anoop as helper Shakundala
- Bindu Murali
- Baby Surendran

== Reception ==
One critic wrote that "The director has tried to maintain a balance to the two storylines that are running parallelly. All in all, Thulasidas has managed to bring out an entertainer with some drama and suspense, and succeeded in that". Another critic wrote that "25th Film directed by Tulasidass disappoints everybody".
