= Oru Small Family =

2010 film

- Theatrical poster
- Directed by: Rajasenan
- Written by: Rajasenan
- Produced by: Gokulam Gopalan
- Starring: Rajasenan; Seetha; Kailash; Ananya
- Cinematography: Jibu Jacob
- Edited by: Raja Muhammed
- Music by: M. Jayachandran; Rajeev Alunkal (lyrics)
- Release date: 26 November 2010
- Country: India
- Language: Malayalam

Oru Small Family is a 2010 Malayalam film directed by Rajasenan, starring Rajasenan, Seetha, Kailash and Ananya.

== Plot ==
The film revolves around two families, one that became rich by making illicit liquor and the other, of a sub-registrar, who tries to fight liquor consumption in society. The boy from the first family falls in love with the sub-registrar's daughter.

== Cast ==
- Rajasenan as Viswanathan
- Seetha as Kousalya
- Kalabhavan Mani as C.I Bhargavan
- Kailash as Kisshor
- Ananya as Ammu Viswanathan
- Suraj Venjaramoodu as Bijoys (Bejois)
- Bheeman Raghu as Hercules (Hercules)
- Salim Kumar
- Kottayam Nazeer as Vasu annan
- Narayanankutty
- K. T. S. Padannayil
- Kochu Preman as Napoleon (Napoleon)
- Biju Kuttan
- Indrans as Kuttan
- K.P.A.C. Lalitha as Kalyani
- Lakshmipriya as Mohini Keshavan
- Kalpana
- Miya as Manikutty

== Soundtrack ==
M. Jayachandran composed the music, and Anil Panachooran and Rajeev Alunkal wrote the lyrics for the songs. The film has three songs sung by Vijay Yesudas, Chinmayi, Jassie Gift, Pradeep Palluruthy and Achu Rajamani.

Track #	Song	Singer(s)
1	"Swantham Swantham"	Vijay Yesudas, Chinmayi
2	"Kallu Kudikkan"	Jassie Gift, Pradeep Palluruthy
3	"Pandu Pandu"	Achu Rajamani
