= Ulta (film) =

Indian Malayalam-language film

- Theatrical release poster
- Directed by: Suresh Poduval
- Written by: Suresh Poduval
- Produced by: Subash Cipy
- Starring: Gokul Suresh; Anusree; Prayaga Martin; Surabhi Lakshmi; Ramesh Pisharody; Siddique; Kalabhavan Shajohn
- Cinematography: Prakash Velayudhan
- Edited by: Shameer Muhammed
- Music by: Gopi Sundar; Sudarsan; Prakash Alex (Background Score)
- Production company: Cipy Creative Works
- Release date: 6 December 2019
- Country: India
- Language: Malayalam

Ulta (transl. Upside down) is a 2019 Indian Malayalam-language action comedy film written and directed by Suresh Poduval (in his directorial debut) and produced by Subash Cipy. The film stars Gokul Suresh, Anusree and Prayaga Martin, with Siddique, Ramesh Pisharody, Kalabhavan Shajohn and Surabhi Lakshmi in supporting roles.

== Plot ==
Ulta is a 2019 Indian Malayalam-language action-comedy film marking the directorial debut of Suresh Poduval. The film is produced by Subash Cipy under the banner of Cipy Creative Works. It features Gokul Suresh, Anusree, and Prayaga Martin in lead roles, with supporting performances by Siddique, Ramesh Pisharody, Kalabhavan Shajohn, and Surabhi Lakshmi.

== Cast ==
- Gokul Suresh as Chandru Mohan Rajeev
- Anusree as Pournami Purushothaman
- Prayaga Martin as Parvathy, Chandru's love interest and Pournami's sister
- Ramesh Pisharody as Purushothaman, Pournami's husband
- Siddique as ADGP Mohan Rajeev IPS, Chandru's father
- Shanthi Krishna as Savithri Devi, Pournami's and Parvathy's mother
- Salim Kumar as Pattelar Dopanna
- Surabhi Lakshmi as Activist Gauri, Pournami's childhood best friend
- Kalabhavan Shajohn as Bhairavan Ayyappan, The main antagonist
- K. P. A. C. Lalitha as Lekshmiyamma
- Jaffar Idukki as Pookkunju
- Kottayam Pradeep as Pappupilla, Purushothaman's father and Pournami's father in law
- Nirmal Palazhi as Madanan
- Junice I V as Thomachan (Chandru's Friend)
- Ajith Jaan as Appu (Chandru's Friend)
- Arya Rohit
- Thesni Khan as SI Meenakshi Lambhodaran, Pournami's childhood friend
- Manju Pathrose as Subaida Pookkunju
- Anjana Appukuttan as Shakunthala
- Muhammed Perambra as Kanarettan
- Anu Nair as Ragini Madanan, Pournami's childhood friend
- Santhosh Keezhattoor as Outhakutty
- Pauly Valsan as Kadatthanattu Madhaviyamma
- Binu Adimali as Shankunni
- Sarassa Balussery as Jyothisharatnam Eashwariyamma
- Subeesh Sudhi as Kochu Keshavan
- Jolly Chirayath as Kousalya
- Sinoj Varghese as Lambodharan
- Sethulekshmi as Chellamma
- Shyni Vijayan as Janu
- Geetha Achuthan as Dr. Anitha
- Lijitha Ezhom as Nurse
- Uma as Radha
- CK Babu as Parameshwaran
- Rajesh Sharma as Ayyappan
- Shamseena as Post Woman
- Kousalya Ezhom as Coconut Climber
- Jisha as Boat Conductor

== Production ==
Ulta is a comedy drama that marks the directorial debut of screenwriter Suresh Poduval, produced by Cipy Creative Works. Principal photography began by October 2018 in Kannur.

== Soundtrack ==
The film features original background score and songs composed by Gopi Sundar and Sudarsan.
