= Family Drama =

Family Drama may refer to:

- Family drama, a macro-genre of film and television drama
- Family Drama (2021 film), an Indian Telugu-language neo-noir film
- Family Drama (2024 film), a Kannada-language dark comedy film
