= Meghasandesam (2001 film) =

2001 film by Rajasenan

- Directed by: Rajasenan
- Written by: Suresh Poduval; M. Sindhuraj
- Produced by: Saji
- Starring: Suresh Gopi; Rajshri Nair; Samyuktha Varma; Napoleon
- Narrated by: Rajasenan
- Cinematography: Venu
- Edited by: A. Sreekar Prasad
- Music by: M. G. Radhakrishnan; Ouseppachan (Background score)
- Release date: 13 April 2001
- Running time: 170 minutes
- Country: India
- Language: Malayalam

Meghasandesam (transl. Message from the Clouds) is a 2001 Indian Malayalam-language horror film directed by Rajasenan and starring Suresh Gopi, Rajshri Nair, Samyuktha Varma and Napoleon.

== Plot ==
Balagopal is a professor at a college. He is engaged to Anjali, an heir to a local royal family that owns a huge estate in Ooty.

Her father's brother tries to extort her. Balagopal goes to Ooty to help Anjali. On the way, he meets a girl, Rosy, who asks for a lift. On the way, they get to know each other and become good friends. After dropping her off, Balagopal notices a sweater left by Rosy. He goes back to return it to Rosy. While at Rosy's home, he realises that she was long dead. On coming back to the bungalow, he meets Rosy's ghost, who is waiting for him. She opens up to him about her past: "Rosy was a student in the same college as Balagopal, and she had a huge crush on him but never expressed it openly to him or met him in person. She decided to express her desire to him after getting permission from her parents, but on the way, she met with an accident and passed away."

Balagopal sympathises with Rosy and treats her as a friend. Rosy even helps Balagopal when goons sent by Anjali's uncle attack him. It all changes when she realises that Balagopal is in love with Anjali; she becomes possessive of him.

When Anjali and her family come to Ooty to stay with Balagopal, Rosy attempts multiple times to threaten her and kill her. To find a solution, Anjali approaches a priest in the church, who guides her to Fr. Rosario, who hails from a family of fabled exorcists. Fr. Rosario arrives and prevents many attacks of Rosy. He tries to talk to Rosy during a prayer session, during which he realizes that Rosy had denounced God, and her powers were becoming evil. When he discusses it with another priest, Fr. Rosario learns that Rosy had not been baptized since her father was an atheist. It was also the reason for Rosy's spirit to denounce God. When Rosy's father learns of his daughter's fate, he agrees to undergo baptism for her benefit. Fr. Rosario plans to agitate Rosy and bring out the evil in her so that when her body is baptized, it dies. Fr. Rosario plans to conduct the wedding of both Anjali and Balagopal. During the wedding, Rosy attacks in full fury, becoming a total evil spirit. However, she returns to her calm form after being baptized and eventually the soul is found eternal peace.

== Cast ==
- Suresh Gopi as Balagopal / Balu
- Rajshri Nair as Rosy Samuel, Balu's ex-Lover
- Samyuktha Varma as Anjali Varma, Balu's fiancée
- Napoleon as Fr. Rosario (extended cameo)
- Oduvil Unnikrishnan as Easwara Varma, Anjali's father
- Harisree Ashokan as Kuttikrishnan, Balu's friend
- Indrans as Thommi, Balu's servant
- Narendra Prasad as Samuel, Rosy's father
- Urmila Unni as Mariya, Rosy's mother
- Abhirami as Kavitha, Rosy's friend
- Karakulam Chandran as Mahendra Varma
- Mallika Sukumaran as college professor
- K. T. S. Padannayil as Chandran Nair
- Geetha Salam as Rosy's grandfather
- Sreekala as Rosy's grandmother
- Dr. Jayan as Mahendra Varma's advocate
- Jayan Cherthala
- Ullaass as a friend of Rosy Samuel

== Soundtrack ==
- Madhumasam Viriyanu....
- Mazhanilavinte Chirakukalil...

== See also ==
- List of Malayalam horror films
