= Nakhangal (2013 film) =

- Directed by: Suresh Krishnan
- Written by: R. Prem Nath
- Produced by: G. P. Vijayakumar
- Starring: Rakendu; Madan Mohan; Megha; Vivek Gopan
- Cinematography: Bijoy Varghese
- Edited by: M. S. Ayyappan Nair
- Music by: M. G. Sreekumar; M. R. Rajakrishnan (score)
- Production company: Seven Arts Productions
- Distributed by: Seven Arts Productions
- Release date: 18 January 2013
- Running time: 140 minutes
- Country: India
- Language: Malayalam

Nakhangal (transl. Nails) is a 2013 India Malayalam-language crime thriller film directed by Suresh Krishnan, written by R. Prem Nath, and produced by G. P. Vijayakumar. It stars Rakendu, Madan Mohan and Megha in lead roles. The film's songs were composed by M. G. Sreekumar and background score by M. R. Rajakrishnan.

== Plot ==
'Nakhangal' tells the tale of three youngsters sharing a rented house. The house belongs to an NRI, whose friend Jeevan arranges for the rental. Giri, a driver in a courier company, Jackson, a tea estate accountant and Sherin, a nurse are the youngsters who stay together.

A fourth person enters the home and their lives when the rent is increased. He introduces himself as a writer with the pen name Manjila. But is fishy about Manjila who carries a gun with him. The plot thickens when he is found dead from drug overdose and Giri finds a bag of money in the room. There are takers for the money who wants it returned to them. But the three friends decide to keep it for themselves.

Meanwhile, Sherin is being persuaded by Vinodh, to accept his love for her. The money orchestrates the rest of the story with broken trust, gruesome murders and a suspense ending.

== Cast ==
- Rakendu as Giri
- Madan Mohan as Jackson
- Megha
- Arun Benny
- Santhosh Sleeba as Vinod Kumar
- Nandu
- Augustine as a neighbour
- Vivek Gopan as Gunda 1
- Sumesh as Gunda 2
- Poojappura Ravi
- Solomon
