= Krishna (Malayalam actor) =

Indian film actor (born 1980)

- Born: 23 March 1980 (age 46); Kainakary, Alappuzha, Kerala, India
- Education: Sacred Heart College, Thevara
- Occupation: Actor
- Years active: 1993–present
- Spouse: Sikha
- Children: 2
- Relatives: Shobhana Chandrakumar Pillai (aunt); Travancore sisters

Krishna is an Indian actor who works predominantly in Malayalam films. He made his acting debut at the age of 14 as a child artist in the Malayalam film Napoleon. His debuted as a lead actor with the 1997 film Rishyasringan alongside Bhanupriya.

== Personal life ==
Krishna was born in Kainakary, Alappuzha, Kerala, India to Mohan Divakaran and Radhalakshmi. He is the grandson of actress Lalitha and cousin to actors Shobhana Chandrakumar Pillai and Vineeth. He attended Bhavans Vidya Mandir School in Elamakkara, before pursuing a Bachelor of Arts from Sacred Heart College, Thevara.

Krishna is married to Sikha, who is an advocate in the Kerala High Court. The couple has a son, Shiv, and a daughter Gouri. The family currently reside in Kochi. He is the owner of Tandoor Chillies restaurant in Kochi.

== Filmography ==
Key
†	Denotes films that have not yet been released

- All films are in Malayalam language unless otherwise noted.

Year	Title	Role	Notes
1994	Napoleon		Child artist
1997	Rishyasringan	Arun	Debut as lead actor
1997	Sneha Saamraajyam		Segment: Punnaaram Kuyil
1998	Daya	Mansoor	
1998	Ayal Kadha Ezhuthukayanu	Jithu	
1998	Harikrishnans	Sudarshanan's friend	
1999	Independence	Krishnan Mukundan	
1999	Vazhunnor	Tony	
2000	Melevaryathe Malakhakkuttikal	Sarath	
2001	Mazhamegha Pravukal	Sreekuttan/Dadasaheb	
2001	Piriyadha Varam Vendum	Praveen Raj	Tamil film
2001	Shahjahan	Raja	Tamil film
2001	Saari		
2002	Punnagai Desam	Ashok Kumar	Tamil film
2002	Snehithan	Anand Xavier	
2003	Thillana Thillana	Bobby	
2003	Margam		
2003	Saudhamini		
2003	Dhad Dhad		Kannada film
2006	Shyaamam		
2008	Mizhikal Sakshi	Ambili	
2009	Chemistry	Dr. Unni	
2010	Avan		
2010	Kanyakumari Express	Ajayan	
2010	Sahasram	Young Ananthapadhamanabhan	
2010	College Days	Rohit Menon	
2011	Traffic	Jikku	
2011	August 15	Mohan Issac	
2012	Ee Thirakkinidayil	Joby Mathew	
2012	Cinema Company	Johnny	
2012	Rasaleela	Unni	
2012	Banking Hours 10 to 4	Roy Mathew	
2012	The Hitlist	Anand	
2013	Hotel California	Rashid	
2013	10:30 am Local Call	Roy Thomas	
2013	Dracula 2012	Benny IPS	
2013	Pakaram	Arif	
2013	Natholi Oru Cheriya Meenalla	Krishnakumar IAS	
2013	August Club		
2013	Ms. Lekha Tharoor Kanunnathu	Sanjay	
2013	Chennaiyil Oru Naal	Jikku	Tamil film
2014	Little Superman	CI Shivan	
2014	Street Light		
2015	Nirnayakam	Airport passenger	Cameo appearance
2015	Chirakodinja Kinavukal	Doctor	Cameo appearance
2015	Loham	Jayaram Shenoy	
2017	Achayans	Giri	Cameo appearance
2018	Chalakkudykkaran Changathy	Sakir	
2019	Safe	Nishanth Nair	
2019	Helen	Car passenger	Cameo appearance
2021	Drishyam 2	Forensic Surgeon	
2022	CBI 5	Doctor	
2022	Pathonpatham Noottandu	Diwan Peshkar Kalyana Krishnan	
2022	A Ranjith Cinema	ACP Dinesh Raj	
2023	2018	Sub Collector	
2024	Anand Sreebala	Coroner	

== Television career ==
=== As actor ===
- Sthreejanmam (Surya TV)
- Akkare Akkare (Surya TV)
- Megham (Asianet)
- Amma Manasu (Asianet)
- Mandharam (Kairali TV)
- Ivide
- Pookkaalam (Surya TV)
- Sayvinte Makkal (Mazhavil Manorama)
- Pokkuveyil (Flowers)
- Kabani (Zee Keralam)
- Kerala Samajam : Oru Pravasi Kadha (Asianet)
- Thinkalkalamaan (Surya TV)
- Swantham Sujatha (Surya TV)
- Valsalyam (Zee Keralam)

=== As Judge ===
- Pachakarani (Kairali TV)
- Vivel Big Break (Surya TV)
- Celebrity Kitchen Magic (Kairali TV)
- Celebrity Kitchen Magic Season 2 (Kairali TV)
- Celebrity Kitchen Magic Season 3 (Kairali TV)
