= Pathinonnil Vyazham =

- Poster
- Directed by: Suresh Krishnan
- Written by: Mahesh Mitra
- Starring: Mukesh; Manya
- Cinematography: K. P. Nambiathiri
- Edited by: Arun Kumar
- Music by: Jayan Pisharody
- Production company: Pooram Films
- Release date: 12 November 2010
- Country: India
- Language: Malayalam

Pathinonnil Vyazham is a 2010 Indian Malayalam-language comedy-drama film directed by Suresh Krishnan and written by Mahesh Mitra, starring Mukesh and Manya. This film was filmed in 2005, but was released five years later; both C.I. Paul and James died by this time.

== Plot ==
Appu works as a bearer in a five star hotel in Palakkad. He happens to meet Chandran Pillai, who is a millionaire and owner of the Chandraprabha Group based in Ooty, when he stays in the hotel for a night to meet the famous astrologer Kizhakkedam. Meanwhile, a couple of scamsters consisting of Rajesh and an unnamed young chick meet up with Chandran Pillai. They get him drunk, shoot him with the young chick in bed, and blackmails him in the morning for 30 lakhs. Appu rescues Chandran Pillai from the fiasco by allegedly burning the video cassettes of the duo. When Chandran Pillai returns to Ooty, the fraudsters turn towards Appu for revenge. Appu rushes to Ooty and begs Chandran Pillai to give him a job. Chandran Pillai refuses, but when Appu tries to blackmail him with the fact that he has the video cassette in his possession rather than having burned it as claimed earlier, he gives in, and appoints him as his driver.

Meenakshi, Chandran Pillai's daughter, hates Appu and repeatedly dismisses him from the job, but Chandran Pillai takes him back, much to her frustration. Nakulan, who used to be their driver, is also frustrated with Appu because he was demoted to a gardener upon Appu's arrival. Chandran Pillai, Meenakshi, and Nakulan unite in their attempts to get rid of Appu.

In the meanwhile, Nakulan is in love with a lovely gorgeous woman Kalyani who was widowed within a month of her marriage and now lives with her mother. They plan to marry sometime soon, and is forced to rendezvous here and then behind the mother's back for now.

It so happens that, when Nakulan is sent by Chandran Pillai to deliver Meenakshi's horoscope to Kizhakkedam, he stops by Kalyani's home. Given to irresistible temptation by the absence of Kalyani's mother, he goes on to make love with Kalyani forgetting all about Meenakshi's horoscope lying about, which gets promptly eaten by a goat. A horrified Kalyani substitutes her own horoscope for the lost one, which an unknowing Nakulan delivers promptly to Kizhakkedam.

The whole household is shocked when the busy Kizhakkedam who was supposed to leave immediately decides to visit the house and declares the shocking facts he discovered from Meenakshi's horoscope. According to the horoscope, Meenakshi has a chance of a wedding either within three months from now or only 10 years later. Secondly whoever marries her first shall die within a month, while a second husband shall live a prosperous life. A shocked Chandra Pillai decides to arrange a spurious groom to be Meenakshi's first husband and Nakulan suggests Appu for this role. They convince Meenakshi too for the scheme, according to which the unknowing Appu shall dies within 30 days and Meenakshi can then wed her fiancée and live happily thereafter.

Unbeknownst to them all, Appu had overheard Kalyani and her mother talking about the horoscope substitution, and now the plans of the trio to use his life to secure Meenakshi's life. Appu decides to submit to their plans so he shall be able to marry and enjoy the lovely, beautiful, gorgeous young girl Meenakshi. Additionally he stipulate a condition that the whole Chandraprabha estate be bequeathed in his name for him to agree to the marriage. Pressured by the time limits imposed by the horoscope and assured that all this does not matter once Appu dies and the estate goes back to Meenakshi, Chandran Pillai agrees. Thus, the whole property is transferred to Appu's name and he weds Meenakshi.

Now, Chandran Pillai and Meenakshi is worried about Appu taking Meenakshi's virginity during the first night, which they do not want to happen. They make up a story that Kizhakkedam has prescribed a date after 30 days for their first night and the breaking of her seal, thus salvaging Meenakshi's virginity from Appu for the time being.

However, Appu ups his game the next morning, and takes the reigns of the company, estate, and household in his hands, while Chandran Pillai and Meenakshi are forced to watch helplessly as Appu is the legal owner now. An insulted and frustrated Meenakshi tries to confront Appu but is inevitably repudiated by him and forced to agree that at the end of the 30 days prescribed by Kizhakkedam, she shall come willingly to Appu's bedroom.

The 30 days pass by, Appu reorganises the company administration for good, firing a manager who was cheating the company of millions, and Chandran Pillai, Meenakshi and Nakulan are worried that Appu has not died so far.

On the 30th day, Nakulan gets the shock of his life when he learns from Kalyani about the substitution of horoscopes, and promptly changes sides, becoming Appu's right hand, shocking Chandran Pillai and Meenakshi. A worried Chandran Pillai joins forces with the deposed manager and sends goons to attack Appu, but Appu thrashes them all and returns home in triumph to celebrate his first night with Meenakshi. Meenakshi, still unwilling to lose her virginity, goes to his room with a knife hidden, but is relieved when Appu shows some restraint and lets her go.

In the morning, Chandran Pillai is deeply embarrassed thinking that his daughter has been deflowered by Appu, and brings Kizhakkedam in urgently, whose prediction, according to him, has failed spectacularly. At this point, the substitution of horoscopes is revealed before all, and Kizhakkedam advises them that Appu is the right husband for Meenakshi. While Appu shows his willingness to leave everything and go away, Meenakshi decides to be Appu's wife for ever and they reconcile.

== Cast ==
- Mukesh as Appu Kuttan / Theraka Bhagawathar
- Manya as Meenakshi
- C.I. Paul as Chandran Pillai
- Nedumudi Venu as Kizhakkedan Narayanan
- Jagathy Sreekumar as Nakulan
- Sadiq as Victor Williams
- Beena Antony as Kalyani
- James as security guard
- Shaju Sreedhar as the fraudster who blackmails Chandran Pillai
- Sree Rekha as the hot young chick who traps Chandran Pillai in bed to blackmail him
