= Suresh Krishnan =

Indian film director and actor

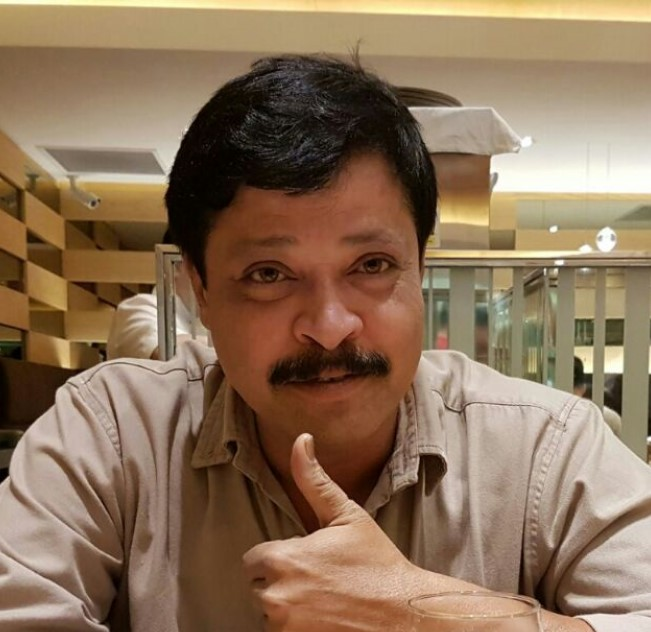
- Born: 5 June 1966 (age 60); Trivandrum, Kerala, India
- Education: University of Kerala
- Occupations: Film director; screenwriter
- Years active: 1993 – present

Suresh Krishnan is an Indian film director and screenwriter who works in Bollywood and Malayalam films. Suresh made his directorial debut with the Malayalam film Bharatheeyam (1997). He mostly works as an associate director in Bollywood films. In 2020, he contested in the reality TV series Bigg Boss (Malayalam season 2).

== Early life ==
Suresh Krishnan was born on 5 June 1966 in Trivandrum, Kerala, India to M. V. Krishnan Nair and Saraswathy Amma. He studied at SMV School, Thiruvananthapuram and graduated from Mahatma Gandhi College, Thiruvananthapuram.

== Film career ==
Suresh Krishnan began his career in films as an assistant director to filmmakers Rajiv Anchal in the Malayalam film Butterflies, followed by Kashmeeram and Guru (1997). Later, he worked as an assistant director to Priyadarshan.

He made his independent debut as a director in 1997 with the Malayalam film Bharatheeyam, followed by the family drama Achaneyanenikkishtam (2001), Vasanthamalika (2003), Pathinonnil Vyazham (2010), and the thriller Nakhangal (2013). Even though, he continued to work as an associate director to Priyadarshan in more than 25 films, mostly in Bollywood, including Malamaal Weekly (2006), Bhool Bhulaiyaa (2007), Kanchivaram (2008), De Dana Dan (2009) and Sharukh Khan starred Billu Barber among other films.

In 2020, Suresh contested in the reality television show Bigg Boss (Malayalam season 2) on Asianet, hosted by actor Mohanlal. He entered the house on 5 January 2020 on day-1 as one among the 17 housemates and was evicted on day-21.

== Filmography ==
Year	Title	Notes	Actor
1995	Greenlandil Oru Puthuvarsham	Telefilm on Doordarshan	Suresh Gopi
1997	Bhaaratheeyam	Also story writer	Suresh Gopi Kalabhavan Mani Suhasini
2001	Indraneelam	TV serial on Doordarshan	Produced by Suresh Gopi, Debut serial for Jyothirmayi
2001	Achaneyanenikkishtam		Biju Menon Mohanlal Kalabhavan Mani
2002	Vasanthamalika		Mukesh Jagathy Sreekumar Uma Shankari
2005	Grihanadhan	Telefilm on Amrita TV	Keerthi Suresh as child artist
2005	Santhanagopalam	TV serial on Asianet	Suraj Venjaramood
2005	Ladies Hostel	TV serial on Asianet	Suraj Venjaramood
2010	Pathinonnil Vyazham		Mukesh, Manya
2013	Nakhangal		Madan Mohan, Rakendu
2020	Bigg Boss (Malayalam season 2)	Reality TV show on Asianet	Evicted on Day 21
2021	Boeing Boeing	Web series on YouTube	Rajani Chandy, Arya, Veena, Fukru, Pradeep Chandran, Alasandra
