= Vasanthamalika =

- Directed by: Suresh Krishnan
- Written by: Mahesh Mithra
- Based on: Budget Padmanabhan (2000)
- Produced by: K. Radhakrishnan
- Starring: Mukesh; Jagadish; Uma Shankari
- Cinematography: K. P. Nambyathiri
- Edited by: Arun Kumar Aravind
- Music by: Perumbavoor G. Reveendranathu; Sharreth (Score)
- Production company: Jayalakshmi Films
- Distributed by: Jayalaskhmi
- Release date: 21 March 2003
- Country: India
- Language: Malayalam

Vasanthamalika is a 2003 Indian Malayalam-language comedy-drama film directed by Suresh Krishnan and written by Mahesh Mithra. It stars Mukesh, Jagadish, and Uma Shankari. It is a remake of the Tamil film Budget Padmanabhan. This was Arun Kumar Aravind's first film as an editor.

== Cast ==
- Mukesh as Balakrishnan a.k.a. Balu, a garment worker
- Uma Shankari as Nandini, the managing director's daughter
- Jagathy Sreekumar as Bodheswaran
- Jagadeesh as Mumbai Madhavan
- Salim Kumar as Komalan
- Kavilraj as College student
- Sai Kumar as Varadharaja settu
- Bindu Panicker as Anandavalli
- Sreenath as Balakrishnan father
- Kalarenjini as Lekshmiamma mother of Balakrishnan
- Nadirshah as Abhilash
- Master Arun as a Child of Kulappura veedu

== Production ==
Biju Menon was initially supposed to play one of the lead roles. Uma Shankari, who made her Malayalam debut in Kuberan, was cast as the heroine.

== Soundtrack ==
- Ennum Palavidha M.G.Sreekumar
- Koomanum Kurumanum M.G. Sreekumar
- Manassinullil Mayangi M.G. Sreekumar
- Poomukhathoro M.G. Sreekumar
- Sightadikkana K.S. Chitra
