= Devan (writer) =

Tamil writer (1913 –1958)

Devan (R. Mahadevan)
- Born: 8 September 1913; Thiruvidaimarudur, Tanjore District, Madras Presidency, British India (now Thanjavur District, Tamil Nadu, India)
- Died: 5 May 1957 (aged 43); Madras, Madras State (now Chennai, Tamil Nadu), India
- Occupations: Managing editor, Ananda Vikatan
- Writing career
- Pen name: Devan
- Notable work: Thuppariyum Sambu

Devan (R. Mahadevan) (8 September 1913 – 5 May 1958) was a 20th-century Indian Tamil-language writer, known for his witty and humorous stories.

== Early life ==
Devan was born in 1913 at Thiruvidaimarudur in present-day Thanjavur district, Tamil Nadu, India, where he did his schooling. He enrolled at Kumbakonam Government College to complete his B.A. degree. He worked as a school teacher for a year, before joining the popular Tamil weekly magazine, Ananda Vikatan in 1933. Devan's first foray into the world of writing was through the humorous short story "Mister Rajamani", written when he was in his twenties.

== Life as an editor ==
Devan started as a Sub-Editor at Ananda Vikatan in 1933. After Kalki Krishnamurthy left Vikatan, worked as Managing Editor from 1942 to 1957.

During this time, he wrote about 20 serials, more than 500 stories, articles and travelogues. A common feature in his works was his gentle sense of humour. He was a popular writer and stories abound of how, when a new issue of Ananda Vikatan came out, everyone in the family would fight to get hold of the copy first.

Devan worked under famous writers like Kalki Krishnamurthy and S. S. Vasan. It was his wish that his stories get published as books, but sadly this did not happen in his lifetime, due to the nature of his contract with Vikatan.

During this time, he also served as Chairman of the Tamil Writers' Guild twice, and helped to promote Tamil literature.

Devan was the editor of Ananda Vikatan until his death in 1957. In his short life, he experimented with different types of writing – travelogues, detective novels, articles, short stories, current affairs. Devan's books are a joy to read even today, when social values and techniques in fiction writing are so different.

About ten of Devan's writings were also dramatised by several Tamil drama troupes, even during his lifetime. He himself wrote most of the dialogues for the plays. More recently, some of his works like Thuppariyum Sambu, Sriman Sudharsanam and Mister Vedhantham were made into television serials also. Only one of his novels, gOmathiyin kAdhalan, was made into a movie, starring T. R. Ramachandran and Savithri.

== Bibliography ==
All of Devan's stories and travelogues were serialised in Ananda Vikatan (with, perhaps, one exception, 'Mythili' which was serialised in 'Naradar'). His writings are copyright of the Devan Endowments. Recently, many of Devan's works have been published by Alliance Publishers, Chennai, India. 'Kizakkup padhippagam' has also recently started publishing Devan's writings. One of his novels, Justice Jagannathan, has been translated into English.

His writings include :

Novels:

- Mythili (1939 )
- Malathi ( 1942)
- Thuppariyum Sambu (1942)
- GOmathiyin KAdhalan
- KalyANi (1944)
- Miss JAnaki
- SrimAn Sudharsanam
- Mr VedhAntham (1949–50)
- Justice JagannAthan (1953–54)
- Lakshmi KatAksham (1951–52)
- CID Chandru (his last novel) (1955–56 )

Other collections of stories, articles and travelogues include:

- Mister RajAmaNi – a series
- Vichuvukku Kadithangal – a series
- AppaLak KachchEri – a series of articles with a recipe at the end of each article
- Aindhu NaadugaLil ARupathu NaaL (60 Days in 5 countries) – Travelogue
- POkkiri MAmA
- PallisAmiyin Thuppu
- MOtAr AgarAthi
- Chinna KaNNan katturaigaL – a series
- RAjiyin PiLLai – a series
- Adhisaya thaambathigaL – a series
- Kamalam SolgirAL – a series
- Podaatha Thapaal – a series
- Sarasuvukku Kadithangal
- manidha subAvam
- chInup payal
- chinnan chiRu kadhaigaL – a series
- pArvathiyin sangalpam
- mallAri rAo kadhaigaL – a series
- En indha asattuththanam
- jAngiri sundharam
- peyarpOna puLugugaL
- prabuvE! uththaravu! – a series
- nadandhathu nadanthapadiyE – a travelogue
- rangUn periyappA
- chonnapadi kELungaL
- rAjaththin manOratham – a series on building a house
