= Achaneyanenikkishtam =

2001 film by Suresh Krishnan

- Directed by: Suresh Krishnan
- Written by: Suresh Poduval
- Produced by: Menaka
- Starring: Kalabhavan Mani; Biju Menon; Lakshmi Gopalaswamy
- Cinematography: K. P. Nambyathiri
- Edited by: N. P. Sathish
- Music by: M. G. Radhakrishnan; Sharreth
- Production company: Revathy Kalamandhir
- Release date: 2 November 2001
- Country: India
- Language: Malayalam

Achaneyanenikkishtam (transl. Father is my favourite) is a 2001 Indian Malayalam-language family drama film directed by Suresh Krishnan, written by Suresh Poduval and produced by Menaka. It features Ashwin Thampi, Kalabhavan Mani, Biju Menon, and Lakshmi Gopalaswamy in the lead roles, and Mohanlal appears in a guest role. The film was released on 30 November 2001. It won the Kerala State Film Award for Best Music Director for M. G. Radhakrishnan.

== Plot ==
The story is about a poor lorry driver named Bhaskaran, who tries to give his son Kunjunni, a good education by sending him to a very expensive school. The rest of the story revolves around the events Kunjunni goes through in his life.This is so-called story of this film .

== Cast ==
- Kalabhavan Mani as Bhaskaran
- Biju Menon as Anand
- Lakshmi Gopalaswamy as Seetha Nair
- Jagathy Sreekumar as Nalinakshan
- Ashwin Thampi as Kunjunni
- Nandu as Kariyachan
- Devan as Andrews Issac
- Suchitra Murali as Sofia
- T. P. Madhavan as Nambeeshan
- Poojappura Ravi as Chettiyar
- Vinu Chakravarthy as Kovai Neelakandan
- Kochu Preman as Kurup Mash
- Sreekala Thaha
- Keerthy Suresh as Kunjunni's classmate
- Mohanlal as Mahadevan (Cameo appearance)

== Soundtrack ==
The film's soundtrack contains 9 songs, all composed by M. G. Radhakrishnan, with lyrics by S. Ramesan Nair. 'Shalabham Vazhimaaruma' is in the Darbari Kanada raga.

No.	Title	Singer(s)
1	"Aa Thathaa"	M. G. Sreekumar, Ranjini Jose
2	"Kaatte Kaatte"	M. G. Sreekumar
3	"Kaatte Kaatte"	Radhika Thilak
4	"Kalivattam"	Kalabhavan Mani
5	"Shalabham Vazhimaarumaa"	M. G. Sreekumar, K. S. Chitra

== Awards ==
The film won the Kerala State Film Award for Best Music Director for M. G. Radhakrishnan.
