= Thulasidas =

Indian film director

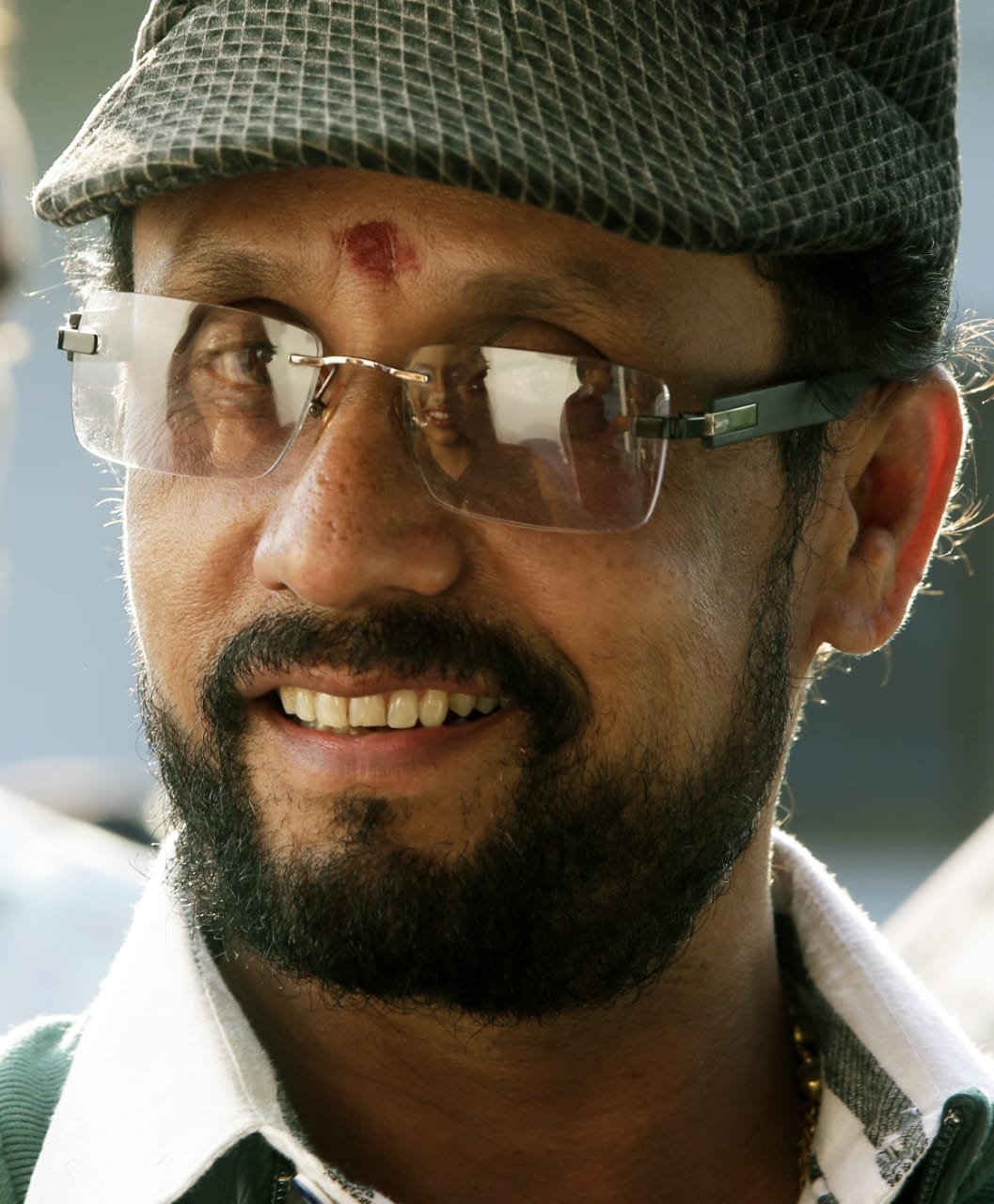
- Born: Venjarammoodu, Thiruvananthapuram, Kerala, India
- Occupation: Film director

Thulasidas is an Indian film and serial director who works in the South Indian film industry, predominantly in Malayalam cinema.

== Filmography ==
Year	Film	Notes
2016	Girls	Released in Tamil as Thiraikku Varaatha Kathai
2011	Killadi Raman	
2010	Again Kasargod Khader Bhai	
2008	College Kumaran	
2007	Rakshakan	
2007	Avan Chandiyude Makan	
2003	Mr. Brahmachari	
2002	Pranayamanithooval	Remake of Tamil film Nee Varuvai Ena
2001	Dhosth	Remake of Tamil film Kannethirey Thondrinal
2000	Melevaryathe Malakhakkuttikal	
1998	Manthrikumaran	
1998	Sooryaputhran	
1997	Kilukil Pambaram	
1997	Mayaponman	
1996	Aayiram Naavulla Ananthan	
1996	Kumkumacheppu	Remake of Telugu film Maavichiguru
1995	Manikya Chempazhukka	
1995	Minnaminuginum Minnukettu	
1995	Sundari Neeyum Sundaran Njanum	
1994	Veettai Paaru Naattai Paaru	Tamil Film; Remake of Malayalam film Sandesam
1994	Malappuram Haji Mahanaya Joji	
1994	Shudhamaddalam	
1993	Ithu Manju Kaalam	
1992	Poochakkaru Mani Kettum	
1992	Congratulations Miss Anitha Menon	
1992	Ezhara Ponnana	
1992	Kasargod Khader Bhai	
1991	Chanchattam	
1991	Mimics Parade	
1991	Parallel College	
1990	Prosecution	
1990	Kouthuka Varthakal	
1989	Layanam	
1988	Onninu Purake Mattonnu	

== Television ==
- Sree mahabhagavatham (Asianet)
- Swamy Ayyappan saranam (Asianet)
- Devi mahathmyam (Asianet)
- Devayani (Surya TV)
- Sabarimala Sri Dharamshala (Asianet)
- Amma (Asianet)
- Pranayam (Asianet)
- Parishudhan (Flowers TV)
- Swayamvaram (Mazhavil Manorama)

== See also ==
- List of Malayalam films from 1986 to 1990
- List of Malayalam films from 1991 to 1995
- List of Malayalam films from 1996 to 2000
