= Madhu filmography =

List of performances by Indian Actor Madhu

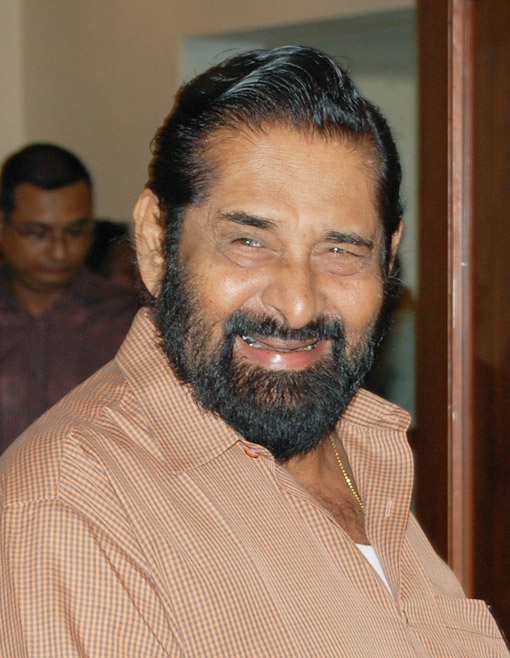
Madhu in 2008

Madhavan Nair, commonly known by his stage name Madhu, is an Indian actor, director, producer, and former film studio owner, who works in Malayalam cinema.

Madhu has so far acted in more than 400 movies including Malayalam, Hindi and Tamil languages. Madhu made his directoral debut in 1970 through the movie Priya, based on the novel ‘Thevadissi’ written by C. Radhakrishnan. Madhu directed eleven more movies including hit films like Sindooracheppu, Manyasree Viswamithran, Neela Kannukal, Akkaldaama, Kamam Krodham Moham, Theekkanal, Dheerasameere Yamuna Theere, Aaraadhana, Oru Yuga Sandhya and Udayam Padinjaru. He was the producer of most of these films. He also produced movies like Kaithappoo, Asthamayam, Shudhikalasham, Prabhatha Sandhya, Vaiki Vanna Vasantham, Archana Teacher, Grihalakshmi, Njan Ekananu, Rathilayam and Mini. He also produced and directed a movie in English Sunrise in the West, which was entirely shot in the United States.

== As actor ==
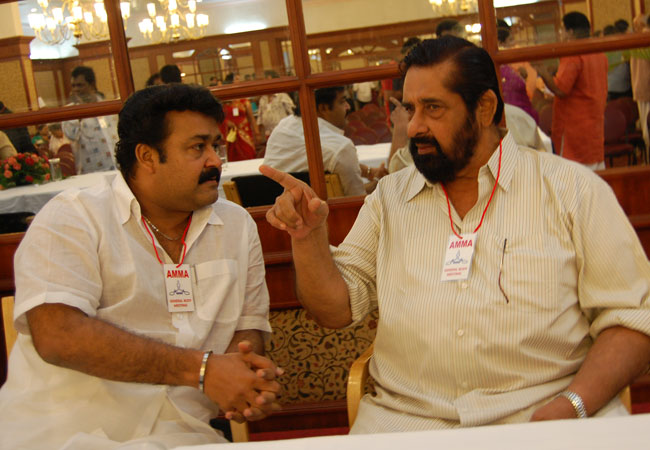
Madhu with actor Mohanlal during AMMA meeting in 2008

Madhu has acted in nearly 400 films in various languages in the span of 60 years.

=== Malayalam films ===
==== 1960s ====
Year	Title	Role	Notes
1963	Ninamaninja Kalpadukal	Stephen	
1963	Moodupadam	Kochukunju	
1963	Ammaye Kaanaan	Balagopal	
1964	Thacholi Othenan	Payyambilly Chandu	
1964	Kutty Kuppayam	Siddique	
1964	Bhargavi Nilayam	Writer	
1964	Manavatti	Babu	
1964	Aadyakiranangal	Pappachan	
1965	Sarpakadu	Dr.Balan	
1965	Jeevitha Yaathra	Rajan	
1965	Pattuthoovaala	George	
1965	Subaida	Ahmed	
1965	Kaliyodam	Dr.Venu	
1965	Kalyana Photo	Sub Inspector John	
1965	Ammu	Bhasi	
1965	Murapennu	Keshavan Kutty	
1965	Thommante Makkal	Kunjachan	
1965	Mayavi	Madhu	
1965	Kattuppokkal	Johny	
1965	Chemmeen	Pareekutty	
1965	Puthri	Babu	
1965	Murappennu	Keshavankutty	
1966	Archana	Rajagopalan	
1966	Manikyakottaram	Venu	
1966	Karuna	Union leader	
1966	Thilothama	Usman	
1967	Nagareme Nandi	Raghavan	
1967	Ramanan	Madhanan	
1967	Ashwamedam	Sadanandan	
1967	Lady Doctor	Johny	
1967	Udhyogastha	Rajasekharan	
1967	Karutha Rathrikal	Dr.Shanthan	
1967	Aval	Joy	
1967	Khadeeja	Dr.Salim	
1967	Anweshichu Kandethiyilla	Antony	
1967	Chekuthante Kotta	Bhaskaran	
1967	Ollathumathi	Babu	
1968	Kadal	Antony	
1968	Viplavakarikal	Menon/Raghavan Nair	
1968	Thulabharam	Babu	
1968	Karutha Pournami	Balu	
1968	Manaswini	Haridas	
1968	Vazhi Pizhacha Santhathi	Unni	
1968	Ragini	Ravi	
1968	Adhyapika	Chacko Sir	
1969	Veettu Mrugam	Vijayan	
1969	Virunnukari	Sethu	
1969	Velliyazhcha	Rajan	
1969	Nadhi	Sunny	
1969	Kallichellamma	Chandrappan	
1969	Vilakuranja Manushyan	Rajan	
1969	Aalmaram	Gopi	
1969	Janmabhoomi	Johny	
1969	Kuruthykkalam	Reghu	

==== 1970s ====
Year	Title	Role	Notes
1970	Olavum Theeravum	Baputty	
1970	Swapnangal	Dr. Balakrishnan	
1970	Abhayam	Prof. Balakrishnan	
1970	Priya	Gopan	
1970	Thurakkatha Vathil	Vaasu	
1970	Bheekara Nimishangal	Venugopal	
1970	Palunkupaathram	Ravi	
1970	Sthree	Ravi	
1970	Ambalapravu	Rajendran	
1970	Nilakkatha Chalanangal	Sam	
1970	Kakkathamburatti	Rajappan	
1971	Vithukal	Unnikrishnan	
1971	Kochaniyathi	Raju	
1971	Ummachu	Maayan	
1971	Aabhijathyam	Madhavan	
1971	Bobanum Moliyum	Balan	
1971	Vilakkyu Vaangiya Veena	Venu	
1971	Sarasayya	Dr. Hareendranath	
1971	Line Bus	Gopi	
1971	Sindooracheppu	Keshavan	
1971	Karakanakadal	Kariya	
1971	Moonnupookkal	Venugopal	
1971	Jalakanyaka	Madhavan	
1971	Mappusakshi	Krishnankutty	
1971	Inqulab Zindabbad	Sridharan	
1971	Prathisandhi	Siddique	
1972	Snehadeepame Mizhi Thurakku		
1972	Gandharavakshetram	Satheeshan	
1972	Naadan Premam	Ikkoran	
1972	Vidhyarthikale Ithile Ithile		
1972	Panimudakku	Keshavan	
1972	Chembarathi	Balachandran	
1972	Puthrakameshti	Keshavan Nair/ Karunakaran IPS	
1972	Manushya Bandhangal	Madhavankutty	
1972	Ini Oru Janmam Tharu	Reghu	
1972	Sathi	Govindan Nair	
1972	Aaradi Manninte Janmi	Prasad	
1972	Theertha Yathra	Rajagopal	
1972	Preethi	Krishnadas	
1972	Pulliman	Devayyan	
1972	Azhimukham	Hamsa	
1972	Lakshyam	Sashi	
1972	Swayamvaram	Vishwanathan	Filmfare Award for Best Actor – Malayalam
1973	Divyadharsanam	Venu	
1973	Udayam	Rajasekharan	
1973	Kaadu	Rajendran	
1973	Thekkankattu	Babu	
1973	Police Ariyaruthe	James	
1973	Madhavikutty	Bhakarankutty	
1973	Yamini	Gopalakrishnan	
1973	Thiruvabharanam	Raghavan	
1973	Mazhakaaru	Prabhakaran	
1973	Manushyaputhran	Karthikeyan	
1973	Swargaputhri	Babu	
1973	Swapnam	Vishwam	
1973	Nakhangal	Shankarankutty	
1973	Eanippadikal	Keshavapilla	
1973	Chenda	Appu	
1973	Soundaryapooja	Rajan	
1973	Chukku	Chackochen	
1974	Youvanam	Mohan	
1974	Bhoomidevi Pushpiniyayi	Jagadeesh	
1974	Manyasree Viswamithran	Marthandan Thampi	
1974	Oru Pidi Ari	Sreekantan Nair	
1974	Neelakannukal	Kunjuraman	
1975	Kamam Krodham Moham	Vincent	
1975	Akkaldaama	Fernandez	
1975	Sindhu	Rajendran	
1975	Swarna Malsyam	Raghavan	
1975	Swami Ayyappan		Guest Role
1975	Sammanam	Reghu	
1975	Omanakkunju	Ramu	
1976	Hridayam Oru Kshethram	Dr. Ramesh	
1976	Theekkanal	Vinod	Filmfare Award for Best Actor – Malayalam
1976	Yakshagaanam	Ravi	
1976	Amma	Venugopalan Thampi	
1976	Themmadi Velappan	Raghavan	
1976	Kanyaadaanam	Jagadeesh	
1976	Samasya	Shankara Warrier	
1976	Manasaveena	Ravi	
1976	Muthu	Thankappan	
1977	Poojakkedukkatha Pookkal	Balachandran	
1977	Neethipeedam	Peter/Shankaran	
1977	Dheerasameere Yamuna Theere	Mohan/younger brother	
1977	Santha Oru Devatha	Rajan	
1977	Itha Ivide Vare	Paili	
1977	Yudhakaandam	Prasad	Filmfare Award for Best Actor – Malayalam
1977	Aparaadhi	Jayachandran	
1977	Rowdy Rajamma	Inspector Shankar	
1977	Vidarunna Mottukal	Headmaster Sathyasheelan	
1977	Aaraadhana	Anand	
1977	Akale Aakaasham	Raveendran	
1977	Nurayum Pathayum	Krishnankutty	
1977	Saritha	Williams	
1977	Kaavilamma	Dr. Balachandran	
1977	Aa Nimisham	Prabhakaran	
1978	Urakkam Varaatha Raathrikal	Jayan	
1978	Eeta	Varuthunny	
1978	Itha Oru Manushyan	Madhusoothanan Thampi	
1978	Kanyaka	Sreekumar	
1978	Agni	Sulaiman	
1978	Njan Njan Mathram	Chandran Pilla	
1978	Beena	Sreenivas	
1978	Jalatharangam	Chandran	
1978	Vadakakku Oru Hridayam	Sadasivan Pilla	
1978	Snehikkan Samayamilla	Rajan	
1978	Ee Manohara Theeram	Sukumarankutty Menon	
1978	Rowdy Ramu	Ramu	
1978	Asthamayam	Dr. Balakrishnan	
1978	Kaithappoo	Babu	
1978	Society Lady	Sridharan	
1978	Snehathinte Mukhangal	Devadas	
1978	Randu Penkuttikal	Dr. Madhavan Nair	
1978	Seemanthini	Sam Mathew	
1978	Naalumanippookkal	Joy Muthalali	
1978	Uthrada Rathri	Advocate	
1978	Ithaanente Vazhi	Dr. Vijayan/Bhargavan	
1978	Avar Jeevikkunnu	Kumar	
1978	Soundaryam		
1979	Venalil Oru Mazha	Vasu	
1979	Oru Raagam Pala Thaalam	Vinod	
1979	Enikku Njan Swantham	Vaasu	
1979	Manushyan	Rajan	
1979	Kayalum Kayarum	Chellappan	
1979	Prabhaathasandhya	Balakrishnan	
1979	Pratheeksha	R.K.Nair	
1979	Sudhikalasam	Vijaya Kumar	
1979	Jeevitham Oru Gaanam	Mathuktty	
1979	Kalliyankattu Neeli	Hemachandran	
1979	Hridhayathinte Nirangal	Balu	
1979	Iniyethra Sandhyakal	Thomas	
1979	Anubhavangale Nanni	Madhavankutty	
1979	Simhaasanam	Gopalan/Ramu	
1979	Edavazhiyile Poocha Minda Poocha	Dr. Raja	
1979	Pathivritha	Babu	
1979	Agniparvatham	Sub Inspector Vishwanathan	
1979	Kathirmandapam	Charlie	
1979	Pushyaraagam	Doctor	
1979	Krishnapparunthu	Advocate	

==== 1980s ====
Year	Title	Role	Notes
1980	Meen	Kuriakose	Kerala State Film Award – Special Jury Award
1980	Deepam	Varma	Kerala State Film Award – Special Jury Award
1980	Rajaneegandhi	Gopinath	Kerala State Film Award – Special Jury Award
1980	Muthuchippikal	Gopi	Kerala State Film Award – Special Jury Award
1980	Swandam Enna Padam	Krishnakumar	Kerala State Film Award – Special Jury Award
1980	Theekadal	Dr. Divakaran	Kerala State Film Award – Special Jury Award
1980	Akalangalil Abhayam	Judge Raghuraman	Kerala State Film Award – Special Jury Award
1980	Ambalavilakku	Gopi	Kerala State Film Award – Special Jury Award
1980	Ithile Vannavar	Rajasekharan/Inspector Rajan	Kerala State Film Award – Special Jury Award
1980	Vaiki Vanna Vasantham	Varmaji	Kerala State Film Award – Special Jury Award
1981	Orikkal Koodi	Chandran	
1981	Aakkramanam	Varghese	
1981	Arikkari Ammu	Appukuttan	
1981	Sambhavam	Mathai	
1981	Kolilakkam	Prabhakaran	
1981	Grihalakshmi	Krishnan Menon, Venu	
1981	Thaaraavu	Chennan	
1981	Raktham	Vishwam	
1981	Pinneyum Pookkunna Kaadu	Aravindan	
1981	Danda Gopuram	Venugopal	
1981	Ira Thedunna Manushyar	Jamal	
1981	Archana Teacher	School Manager	
1981	Kaattupothu		
1982	Karthavyam	Major Ramkumar	
1982	Aarambham	Moidu	
1982	Njan Ekananu	Madhavankutty Menon	
1982	Padayottam	Devarajarajan	
1982	Aayudham	Sathyapaalan	
1983	Yudham	Ramu	
1983	Aana	Jabbar	
1983	Aadhipathyam	Sulaiman	
1983	Bandham	Vasu	
1983	Angam	Inspector Lawrence	
1983	Kodungattu	DYSP Balachandran	
1983	Enne Njan Thedunnu	Madhava Menon, Gopinatha Menon	
1983	Rathilayam	Mammutty	
1983	Paalam	Contractor Kumaran	
1983	Nanayam	Vishwanathan Muthalali	
1983	Pinnilavu	Keshava Panikkar	
1983	Mortuary	C Krishnadas	
1983	Arabikkadal	Xavier Muthalali	
1983	Samrambham	Vasu	
1983	Passport	Balan	
1984	Oru Painkili Katha	Madhavankutty	
1984	Jeevitham	Rajan Menon	
1984	Aarorumariyathe	Prof. Panicker	
1984	Ithiripoove Chuvannapoove	Keshavamenon	
1984	Aattuvanchi Ulanjappol	Viswanathan	
1984	Kurishuyudham	Mathew Cheriyachan	
1984	Alakadalinakkare	Balu S Das	
1984	Chakkarayumma	Mathews	
1984	Manasse Ninakku Mangalam	Advocate Vishwanathan	
1984	Idavelakku Sesham	Judge Rajasekharan	
1984	Thirakkil Alppa Samayam	Khader Hajiyar	
1984	Ariyaatha Veethikal	Judge Janannathan	
1985	Kannaram Pothi Pothi	Karunakaran	
1985	Vellam	Mathukutty	
1985	Pacha Velicham	Captain Nair	
1985	Janakeeya Kodathi	Gopi	
1985	Katha Ithuvare	Major Vishwanathan	
1985	Guruji Oru Vakku	Guruji	
1985	Ayanum	Itoop	
1985	Ivide Ee Theerathu	Prof Thampi	
1985	Orikkal Oridathu	Moidu	
1986	Udayam Padinjaru	A R K Menon	
1986	Oru Yugasandhya	Keshava Kuruppu	
1987	Ithrayum Kaalam	Chackochan	
1987	Athirthikal	Major Frederick Mukundan	
1988	Aparan	Keshavapilla	
1988	1921	Aali Musliyar	
1988	Witness	Advocate Madhavan Thampy	
1988	Oozham	Gandhian Krishnan Nair	
1988	Simon Peter Ninakku Vendi	Keshavadas	
1989	Devadas	Unnithan	
1989	Naduvazhikal	Ananthan	
1989	Mudra	IG Joseph Chacko	
1989	Jaathakam	Prof Ramachandran	
1989	Chanakyan	IG Gopalakrisha Panicker	
1989	Oru Sayahnathinte Swapnam	Brigadier R.K.Menon	
1989	The News	Surendran Menon	

==== 1990s ====
Year	Title	Role	Notes
1990	Lal Salam	Medayil Ittichan	
1990	Samrajyam	IG Balakrishnan	
1990	Ammayude Swantham Kunju Mary	Fr.Franics	
1990	Nammude Naadu	Krishna Menon	
1990	Veena Meettiya Vilangukal	Velappan	
1991	Abhayam		
1992	Champakulam Thachan	Mootha Asari	
1992	Sabarimalayil Thanka Sooryodayam	Sankara Pilla	
1992	Kudumbasametham	Raghava Kurup	Kerala State Film Award – Special Jury Award
1992	Kunjikuruvi	Fr. Francis	
1993	Ottayadipathakal	Bhaskara Menon	
1993	Yaadhavam	Vishwanatha Menon	
1993	Aayirappara	Pappi	
1993	Ekalavyan	Sreedharan	
1993	Thalamura	Mundakyal Markose	
1994	Varanamaalyam	Varma	
1994	Malappuram Haji Mahanaya Joji	Hajiyar	
1994	Gothram	Keshavan Master	
1995	Simhavalan Menon	Menon	
1995	Manthrikante Pravu	Vasudevan	
1995	Prayikkara Pappan	Shankunny	
1995	Samudhayam	Ibrahim Mooppan	
1997	The Good Boys	Prathapa Varma	
1997	Varnapakittu	Pakalomattom Itty	
1997	Moksham		
1998	Harthal	Imam Thangalupappa	
1998	Aakhosham	Geevarghese Punookkaran	
1998	Samaantharangal	Minister	
1999	Pranaya Nilavu	Thangal	
1999	Onnaamvattam Kandappol	Prabhakara Varma	
1999	Garshom	Madhavankutti Mash	
1999	Stalin Sivadas	Comrade Krishnan Nair	
1999	Ezhupunna Tharakan	Ezhupunna Owtha Tharakan	

==== 2000s ====
Year	Title	Role	Notes
2001	Sharja To Sharja	Justice Vishwanathan Menon	
2004	Chathikkatha Chanthu	Vasumathi's grandfather	
2005	Ben Johnson	Govindamenon	
2005	Naran	Valiya Nambiar	
2005	Thaskara Veeran	Arakkalam Paili	
2006	Rashtram	Maliyekkal Ousephachen	
2006	Raavanan	Chief Minister	
2007	Balyam	Swamiji	
2007	Hallo	Bada Bhai	
2007	Panthaya Kozhi	Abdu Rowther	
2008	Twenty:20	Viswanatha Menon	
2008	Robo	Madhavan	
2008	Madampi	Judge	
2008	Aayudham	Thangal	
2008	Kanal Kannadi	Sidharthamenon	
2009	Thirunnakkara Perumal	Mathai	
2009	Passenger	TV Channel Chairman	

==== 2010s ====
Year	Title	Role	Notes
2010	Brahmasthram	Chief Minister	
2010	Chithrakuzhal	Charu's grandfather	
2010	Sahasram	Minister Sreekanthan	
2010	Patham Adhyayam	Ananda Varma	
2010	Kaaryasthan	Kizhakkedathu Krishnawarrier	
2011	Daivathinte Kaiyoppu	Kariya	
2011	Umma		
2011	Lucky Jokers	Valiya Thampuran	
2011	August 15	Dr.John	
2012	Pratheekshayode		
2012	Spirit	Captain Nambiar	
2012	Prabhuvinte Makkal	Prabhu	
2012	Mazhavillinattam Vare		
2013	Mahatma Ayyankali	Ootath Parameshwaran Pilla	
2013	Geethaanjali	Babychayan	
2013	Manikya Thamburatiyum Christmas Carolum	Pathrose	
2013	White Paper	Psychiatrist	
2013	72 Model	Kuttan Pilla	
2014	Mylanchi Monchulla Veedu	Soya Sahib	
2014	John Paul Vaathil Thurakkunnu	Korah	
2014	Nelumbo		
2014	Iniyum Ethra Dooram		
2014	Snehamulloral Koodeyullappol	Grandfather	
2014	Little Superman		
2014	Ettekaal Second	Menon	
2014	Raktharakshassu		
2014	Parayan Baaki Vechathu		
2014	Avarude Veedu		
2014	The Dolphins	Achankuttichan	
2015	Cinema @ PWD Rest House		
2015	Kukkiliyar	Prof. Bhaskaran	
2015	Uthara Chemmeen		
2015	Aashamsakalode Anna	Home Minister Punnakkadan	
2015	Ammakkoru Tharattu	Poet Joseph Pushpavanam	
2015	Samrajyam II: Son of Alexander	Balakrishnan	
2015	Kidney Biriyani		
2015	Njan Samvidhanam Cheyyum		
2016	Celebration		
2017	Swayam	Shankaran Vaidyar	
2017	Vedham		
2017	Eliyammachiyude Aadhyathe Christmas		
2017	Basheerinte Premalekhanam		
2017	Valapottukal	Valiya Ustad	
2017	Next Token Number		
2017	Neravam		
2018	Dust Bin		
2018	My School		
2018	Sthaanam	Alexander	
2018	Velakkari Aayi Irundhalum Ni En Mohavally		
2019	Oru Yamandan Premakadha	Grandfather	400th film
2019	Vishudha Pushthakam		
2019	Children's Park		
2019	Magic Moments		

==== 2020s ====
Year	Title	Role	Notes
2021	One	Prof. Vasudeva Panicker	Cameo
2021	Neeravam		
2022	PK Rosy		
2022	Run Kalyani	Father	

=== Tamil films ===
Year	Film	Role	Notes
1973	Bharatha Vilas	Himself	Guest appearance
1975	Swami Ayyappan		Guest appearance
1991	Dharma Durai	Pandi Durai	
2009	Oru Ponnu Oru Paiyan	Viswanathan	

=== Hindi films ===
Year	Film	Character	Notes
1969	Saat Hindustani	Shubodh Sanyal	
2005	Chakachak	Chadu Baba	
2017	Maiya	Dadaji	

== As director ==
Year	Film	Notes
1970	Priya	Won Kerala State Film Award for Second Best Film
1971	Sindooracheppu	Won Kerala State Film Award for Second Best Film
1972	Sathi	
1974	Manyasree Viswamithran	
1974	Neelakannukal	
1975	Akkaldaama	
1975	Kaamam Krodham Moham	
1976	Theekkanal	
1976	Dheerasameere Yamuna Theere	
1977	Aaraadhana	
1986	Oru Yugasandhya	
1986	Udayam Padinjaru	

== As producer ==
- Sathi (1972)
- Manyasree Vishwamithran (1974)
- Akkaldaama (1975)
- Kaamam Krodham Moham (1975)
- Kaithappoo (1978)
- Asthamayam (1978)
- Prabhaathasandhya (1979)
- Shudhikalasham (1979)
- Vaiki Vanna Vasantham (1980)
- Grihalakshmi (1981)
- Archana Teacher (1981)
- Njaan Ekananu(1982)
- Rathilayam (1983)
- Udayam Padinjaru (1986)
- Mini(1995)

== As playback singer ==
- Sahakarikkatte Sahaja (Bit) ... Ramanan (1967)
- Ariyoo (Bit) ... Ramanan (1967)
- Ramananeeyennil (Bit) ... Ramanan (1967)

== In television ==
Year	Title	Language	Channel
	Yudham	Malayalam	DD Malayalam
2005	Kadamattathu Kathanar	Malayalam	Asianet
2006	Dial 100	Malayalam	Surya TV
2007	Daya	Malayalam	Kairali TV
2008-2009	Sivasakthi	Tamil	Sun TV
2008	Kana Kaanum Kaalangal	Tamil	Vijay TV
2011	Missamma	Telugu	MAA TV
2011	Alavuddinte Albuthavilakku	Malayalam	Asianet
2013	Chandralekha	Malayalam	Asianet
2013	Nirakoottu	Malayalam	Kairali TV
2013	Nirapakkitu	Malayalam	Media One
2013	Sathyameva Jayathe	Malayalam	Surya TV
2013-2014	Avakashikal	Malayalam	Surya TV
2014	Mohakkadal	Malayalam	Surya TV
2015	Sundari	Malayalam	Mazhavil Manorama
2015	Meghasandesham	Malayalam	Kairali TV
2015	Ival Yamuna	Malayalam	Mazhavil Manorama
2016	Sagaram Sakshi	Malayalam	Surya TV
2017	Eeran Nilavu	Malayalam	Flowers TV
2017	Aparichitha	Malayalam	Amrita TV
2018	Comedy Stars season 2 (as Judge)	Malayalam	Asianet
