= T. P. Madhavan =

Indian actor (1935–2024)

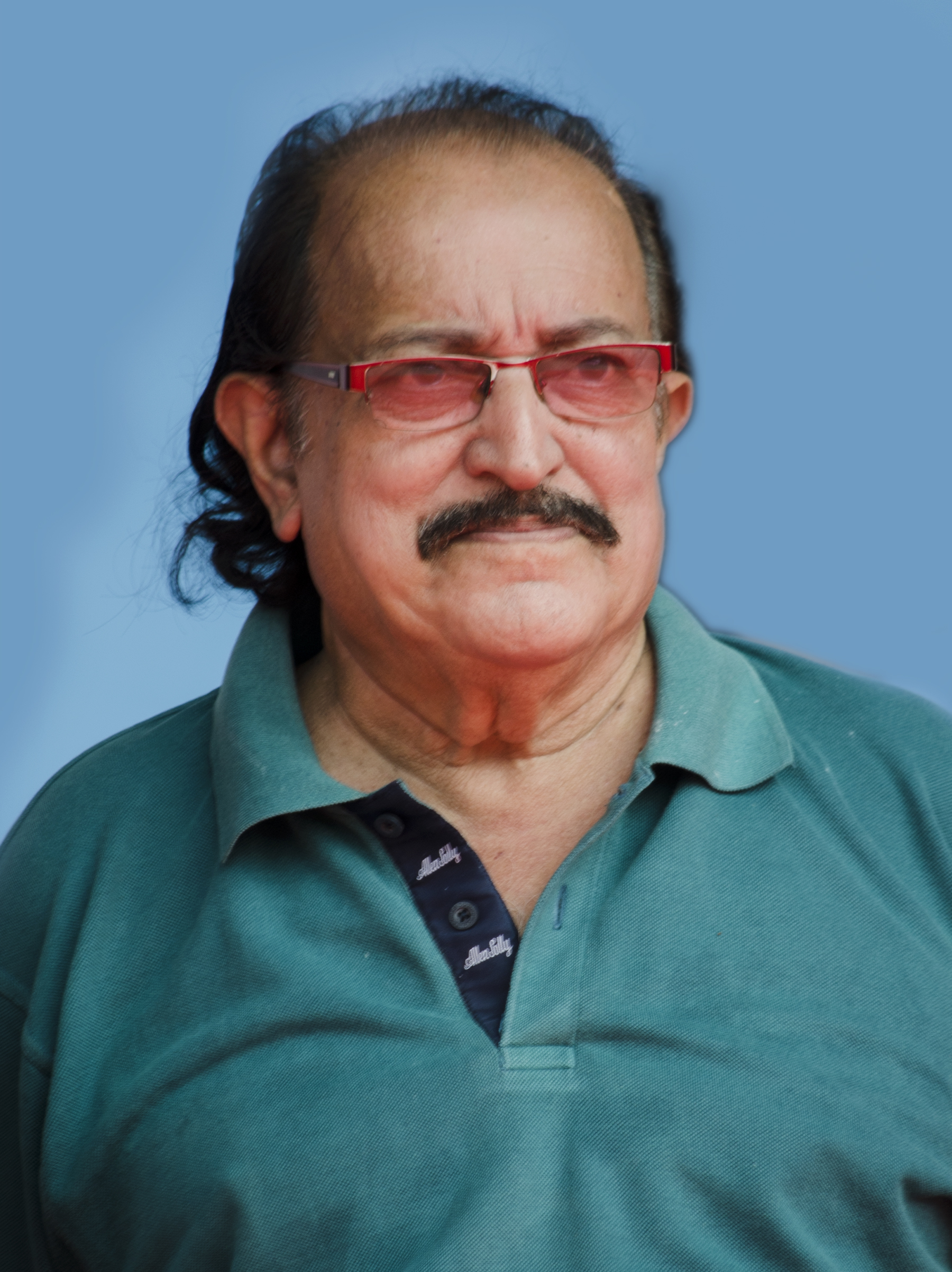
- Madhavan in 2015
- Born: 7 November 1935; Trivandrum, Kingdom of Travancore, British India (present day Kerala, India)
- Died: 9 October 2024 (aged 88); Kollam, Kerala, India
- Occupations: Actor; Film producer; Journalist
- Years active: 1975–2016
- Spouse: Girija Menon
- Children: 2 (incl. (Raja Krishna Menon)
- Parents: Dr. N. P. Pillai; Saraswathi
- Relatives: P. K. Narayana Pillai (grandfather); T. N. Gopinathan Nair (uncle)

T. P. Madhavan (7 November 1935 – 9 October 2024) was an Indian actor who worked in Malayalam films. He began acting at age 40 and appeared in over 600 films. Initially known for playing antagonistic roles, he transitioned to comedic roles and to character roles in his later career.

== Early life ==
Madhavan was born on 7 November 1935 in Trivandrum, Kerala, Kingdom of Travancore, British India, as the eldest son of Dr. N. P. Pillai and Saraswathi. He had a brother, Narayanan, and a sister, Radhamani. His father served as the dean of the University of Kerala. Madhavan was the grandson of literary scholar P. K. Narayana Pillai and nephew of dramatist T. N. Gopinathan Nair. He completed his post-graduation in sociology at Agra University.

Madhavan briefly joined the Indian Army but left after six months due to a hand injury. He then began working as a journalist for The Indian Express in Bombay, earning a salary of Rs.175 per month. He later moved to Bangalore, where he joined an advertising agency where his salary rose to Rs.400. Eventually, he relocated to Kolkata, which paved the way for his entry into the film industry.

== Career ==
Madhavan made his acting debut at age 40. Initially recognized for playing villainous roles, he later transitioned to comedic parts and eventually to character roles. He was introduced to cinema while working in Kolkata, where he became friends with actor-director Madhu. At the time, Madhu was searching for an actress for his upcoming Malayalam directorial Priya (1970), and Madhavan assisted him in finding one. He later helped Madhu again during the shooting of Kaamam Krodham Moham (1975) and Akkaldaama (1975) in Bangalore. Madhavan made his film debut with small roles in these films. From then on, he began appearing in brief roles in Malayalam films. His first significant role came in Kalika (1980), directed by Balachandra Menon, where he portrayed a handicapped man.

The 1980s and 1990s marked Madhavan's most prolific period in Malayalam cinema. His other notable films include Kalikkalam, Nadodikkattu, Vietnam Colony, Sandesham, Lelam, Ayal Kadha Ezhuthukayanu, Narasimham, Pappayude Swantham Appoos, Pulival Kalyanam, Ananthabhadram. He has also acted in Malayalam television serials. Over the course of his career, he has acted in more than 600 films. He last appeared in the film Pretham Undu Sookshikkuka (2017).

== Personal life ==
He was married to Girija Menon, but their marriage ended in divorce. They have a son, Raja Krishna Menon and a daughter, Devika. His son is a film director in the Hindi film industry. Madhavan served as the first general secretary of the Association of Malayalam Movie Artists (AmmA) and was part of the organization for 10 years.

He was residing in Ernakulam before relocating to Thiruvananthapuram, where he developed a urinary disease. Afterward, he went to an ashram in Haridwar but was hospitalized following a collapse. From 2015, Madhavan resided in Gandhibhavan, an old age home in Pathanapuram, following a stroke. In his later years, he suffered from memory loss. He died at a hospital in Kollam on 9 October 2024, at the age of 88.

== Filmography ==
=== Films ===
Year	Title	Role	Notes
1975	Akkaldaama		
1975	Raagam	Priest	
1975	Kaamam Krodham Moham		
1975	Pennpada	DSP	
1975	Love Letter		
1975	Love Marriage	Police officer	
1975	Chandanachola		
1975	Chief Guest		
1976	Light House	Bhaskaran Nair	
1976	Yakshagaanam		
1976	Chirikkudukka	Gopalan Nair	
1976	Mohiniyaattam	Nalini's husband	
1977	Dheerasameere Yamuna Theere	Dr. Kuttikrishnan	
1977	Achaaram Ammini Osharam Omana	Pankajakshan	
1977	Jagadguru Aadisankaran	Govinda Guru	
1977	Niraparayum Nilavilakkum		
1977	Anugraham	Collector T. P. Madhavan	
1977	Samudram	Police Inspector	
1977	Aparadhi	Police Officer Kumaran	
1977	Satyavan Savithri		
1977	Aval Oru Devaalayam		
1978	Nivedyam	Advocate	
1978	Anubhoothikalude Nimisham		
1978	Kudumbam Namukku Sreekovil		
1978	Kalpavriksham	Rani's father	
1978	Iniyum Puzhayozhukum	Doctor	
1978	Aanakkalari		
1978	Sthree Oru Dukham		
1979	Kalliyankattu Neeli	Hippie	
1979	Agni Vyooham		
1979	Enikku Njaan Swantham	Madhavankutty	
1979	Oru Raagam Pala Thaalam		
1979	Allauddinum Albhutha Vilakkum	Abdulla	
1979	Avalude Prathikaram		
1979	Aavesham		
1980	Vaiki Vanna Vasantham		
1980	Sakthi	Michael	
1980	Arangum Aniyarayum	Robert	
1980	Ashwaradham	James	
1980	Deepam	Geetha's father	
1980	Aniyaatha Valakal	Panikkar	
1981	Thaaraavu	Kunjappi	
1981	Archana Teacher		
1981	Kolilakkam		
1981	Panchapaandavar		
1981	Manassinte Theerthayathra	Thomas Mathew	
1983	Aana	Mathachan	
1983	Prasnam Gurutharam		
1983	Lekhayude Maranam Oru Flashback		
1983	Shesham Kaazhchayil		
1984	Uyarangalil	Dr. Varghese	
1984	Arante Mulla Kochu Mulla	Sankunny Menon	
1985	Ente Ammu Ninte Thulasi Avarude Chakki		
1985	Eeran Sandhya	Avarachan	
1985	Akalathe Ambili	Menon	
1985	Guruji Oru Vaaku		
1985	Orikkal Oridathu		
1985	Gayathridevi Ente Amma		
1985	Manicheppu Thurannappol		
1986	Koodanayum Kattu		
1986	Vivahithare Ithile		
1986	Icecream		
1986	Geetham		
1986	Sunil Vayassu 20	Sunil's father	
1986	Rareeram	Man at the Bank	
1987	Kaalam Maari Kadha Maari	Mammali	
1987	Vrutham	Prasad	
1987	Sruthi	Pillai	
1987	Nadodikkattu	MD Mohanakrishnan	
1987	Irupathaam Noottaandu		
1987	Nirabhedangal		
1987	Theertham	Sudhakaran	
1987	Sarvakalashala	Psychiatrist	
1987	Jaalakam	Kurup Mash	
1987	Achuvettante Veedu	Rugmini's brother	
1987	Adimakal Udamakal	Minister	
1988	Moonnam Mura	Panikkar	
1988	Oru CBI Diary Kurippu	Sreedharan	
1988	Mrithyunjayam		
1989	Innale	Swamy	
1990	Marupuram	Krishnanunni Menon	
1990	Vyooham	Settu	
1990	Vachanam		
1990	Perumthachan		
1990	Thalayana Manthram	Company Manager	
1990	Randam Varavu	Public Prosecutor	
1990	Mukham	Usha's father	
1990	Kalikkalam	Thomas	
1991	Kizhakkunarum Pakshi	Pilla	
1991	Sandesam	C.I. Kannan	
1991	Ulladakkam	Doctor	
1991	Nettippattom		
1991	Kilukkam		
1991	Aavanikunnile Kinnaripookkal	Lonappan	
1991	Cheppu Kilukkunna Changathi	Bank Manager	
1991	Chanchattam	G. Raveendranath	
1991	Apoorvam Chilar	Chandran	
1991	Adayalam	M.K. Keshavan	
1991	Kanalkattu		
1992	Thiruthalvaadi		
1992	Vietnam Colony	Krishnamurthy's Ammavan	
1992	Mahanagaram	Hassan Rowther	
1992	Aham		
1992	Sooryamanasam		
1992	Kudumbasammetham		
1992	Pappayude Swantham Appoos		
1993	Bhoomi Geetham	Driver Shivaraman	
1993	Maya Mayooram	Raghupathi	
1993	Bhaagyavaan	Security Guard	
1993	Journalist	Minister	
1993	Avan Ananthapadmanabhan		
1993	Aalavattam		
1993	Thalamura		
1993	Jackpot		
1993	Vakkeel Vasudev	Mathai	
1993	Sakshal Sreeman Chattunni	Kaimal	
1994	Rudraksham	Appunni Nair	
1994	Chukkan	Tehsildar	
1994	Varanamaalyam	Govindan Nair	
1994	Sukham Sukhakaram		
1994	Manathe Kottaram	Security Guard	
1994	Pingami	News Paper Editor	
1994	Pavam I. A. Ivachan	Koyikkal Balan Thampy	
1994	Manathe Vellitheru	Underworld Don	
1994	Minnaram	Doctor Peter	
1994	Avan Ananthapadmanabhan		
1995	Vrudhanmare Sookshikkuka	Thirumala Thommichan	
1995	Thacholi Varghese Chekavar		
1995	Sakshyam	Amavan	
1995	Kaattile Thadi Thevarude Ana	Madhavan	
1995	Aksharam	Madhava Menon	
1995	Punnaram	Eradi	
1995	Agnidevan	Kochammini's brother	
1995	Mazhayethum Munpe	Narayanan Nair	
1995	Oru Abhibhashakante Case Diary	Pothuval	
1996	Madamma	Electricity Board Engineer	
1997	Superman	Home Minister	
1997	Lelam	Minister C. K. Balakrishnan	
1997	Katha Nayakan	Krishna Menon	
1997	Janathipathyam	IG Kaimal IPS	
1997	Aaraam Thampuran	Pisharody	
1997	Mannadiar Penninnu Chenkotta Checkan	Vakeel	
1997	Chandralekha		
1998	Kaikudunna Nilavu	Janardhanan	
1998	Oro Viliyum Kathorthu	Judge	
1998	Sooryaputhran	Vilwamangalam Thirumeni	
1998	Sundarakilladi		
1998	Kottaram Veetile Apputtan		
1998	Ayushman Bhava		
1998	Mayilpeelikkavu	Thantrippadu	
1998	Kusruthi Kuruppu	Narendran's Secretary	
1998	Daya	Hussain	
1998	Ayal Kadha Ezhuthukayanu	Police Sub Inspector	
1999	The Godman		
1999	English Medium	Headmaster	
1999	Pathram	Harivamsilal Pannalal	
1999	Panchapandavar	Kumaran Asan	
1999	Pallavur Devanarayanan		
1999	Friends	Poonkulathu Damodara Menon	
1999	Ezhupunna Tharakan	Justice Mahadevan	
1999	Stalin Sivadas	Leader Harindran	
2000	The Warrant	Annie's father	
2000	Pilots	Fr. Stephen Abraham	
2000	Nadan Pennum Natupramaniyum	Madhavan	
2000	Narasimham	Raman Nair	
2000	Sathyam Sivam Sundaram	Hotelier	
2000	Madhuranombarakattu		
2000	Cover Story	Retd. Head Constable Chandran Nair	
2000	Arayannangalude Veedu	Neena's father	
2000	Thenkasipattanam	Sangeetha's Uncle	
2001	Kakkakuyil	D.Y.S.P Madhava Varma	
2001	Raavanaprabhu	Nambyar	
2001	Layam		
2001	Rakshasa Rajavu	Ponnachan's brother	
2001	Nariman	DGP Akhilesh Avasthi	
2001	Achaneyanenikkishtam	Nambeeshan	
2001	One Man Show	Dr. Chandradas	
2002	Nammal	Principal	
2002	Thandavam	Warrier	
2002	Shivam	Yasodharan	
2002	Jagathy Jagadeesh in Town	Amar Baba Settu	
2002	Desam		
2002	Yathrakarude Sradhakku	K.K. Karthikeyan	
2002	Kalyanaraman	Ambattu Thampi's relative	
2003	Choonda	Gopalan	
2003	Gramaphone	Mathachayan	
2003	Nala Damayanthi		Tamil film
2003	Melvilasam Sariyanu	Dr. Ananda Shankar	
2003	Hariharan Pilla Happy Aanu	Rosario	
2003	Pulival Kalyanam	Ramesh's father	
2003	Manassinakkare	Adv. Charles	
2003	Parinamam		
2004	Ennittum		
2004	Udayam		
2004	Vismayathumbathu	Hospital Patient	
2004	Chathikkatha Chanthu	Sathyan	
2004	Wanted	Politician	
2004	Natturajavu	Secretary	
2004	Black		
2004	Vesham	Judge	
2005	Anandabhadram	Ramunni Nair	
2005	Udayananu Tharam	Bhaskarettan	
2005	Kochi Rajavu	College Principal	
2005	Ben Johnson	Minister	
2005	Thaskara Veeran	Ramkumar	
2005	Pauran	Narayanan	
2005	Pandippada	Bhuvanachandran's father	
2005	Bharathchandran I.P.S.	Minister Vakkalam Moosa	
2005	Boyy Friennd	Leader K.R	
2005	Rajamanikyam	College Principal	
2006	Rashtram	Damodharan Pilla	
2006	Lion	Minister Kizhuppally	
2006	The Don		
2006	Lanka		
2006	Balram vs. Tharadas		
2006	Prajapathi	Appa Swami	
2006	Vaasthavam	Govindan Namboodiri	
2006	Arunam		
2006	Smart City		
2006	Enittum		
2006	Moonnamathoral		
2006	Baba Kalyani	Prabhakaran	
2007	Romeo	Venkidi	
2007	Panthaya Kozhi	Settu	
2007	Inspector Garud	Minister Sathyanathan	
2007	Detective	Raghavan	
2007	Mayavi	Home Minister	
2007	Ayur Rekha	Dr. Thomas George	
2007	Athisayan		
2007	Time	DGP Raman Naik IPS	
2007	Aakasham	Subramaniyam Potti	
2007	Kangaroo	Paul K. Mani	
2008	Roudram	ASI Ayyappan Nair	
2008	College Kumaran	Vasudevan Muthalali	
2008	Malabar Wedding	Thampi	
2008	Thirakkatha	Dr Sreenivasan	
2008	Twenty:20	Minister's PA Francis	
2009	Red Chillies	Iyengar	
2009	Swantham Lekhakan	Chief Minister George Isaac	
2009	Evidam Swargamanu	Minister Stephen Edakochi	
2009	Robin Hood	Minister Manjooran	
2009	Kappal Muthalaali		
2009	Colours	Man at the party	
2009	Passenger	Thankappan	
2009	Thirunakkara Perumal	Thankappan	
2010	Alexander The Great		
2010	Marykkundoru Kunjaadu	Dr. Pisharody	
2010	Oru Naal Varum		
2010	Drona 2010	Pisharody	
2010	Happy Husbands	Retd. DGP Alexander Mathews IPS	
2010	Chekavar	Madhavan	
2011	Karayilekku Oru Kadal Dooram	Kunjettan	
2011	Collector	Sankaran Nampoothiri	
2011	Sarkar Colony		
2011	Indian Rupee	Swami	
2012	The King & the Commissioner	Dr. K.R. Mahadevan	
2012	Simhasanam	Issac	
2012	Ayalum Njanum Thammil		
2012	Mullassery Madhavan Kutty Nemom P. O.	Pisharody	
2012	Ordinary	Bhargavan	
2012	Cinema Company	Military Uncle	
2012	Spirit		
2013	Pigman	Union Head	
2015	Tharangale Saakshi		
2016	Maalgudi Days	Principal	
2017	Pretham Undu Sookshikkuka		

=== Television ===
- Daya (Asianet)
- Kabani (Zee Keralam)
- Chechiyamma (Surya TV)
- Aluvayum Mathikariyum (Asianet Plus)
- Moonnumani (Flowers TV)
- Pattu Saree (Mazhavil Manorama)
- Aa Amma (Kairali TV)
- Vigraham (Asianet)
- Sthree Oru Santhwanam (Asianet)
- Ente Manasaputhri (Asianet)
- Mahathma Gandhi Colony (Surya TV)
- Manthrakodi (Asianet)
- Priyamanasi (Surya TV)
- Vishudha Thomasleeha (Asianet)
- Swami Ayyapan (Asianet)
- Kadamattathu Kathanar (Asianet)
- Valayam (DD Malayalam)

== Awards ==
Madhavan has received Prem Nazir Award and Ramu Karyat Award for lifetime achievement.
