= P. Gopikumar =

Indian film director (1943–2020)

- Born: 12 July 1943; Ponnani, Kerala, British Raj
- Died: 19 October 2020 (aged 77); Palakkad, Kerala, India
- Occupation: Director
- Years active: 1970–2003
- Family: P. Chandrakumar (brother); P. Sukumar (brother)

P. Gopikumar (12 July 1943 - 19 October 2020) was a Malayalam film director.

== Career ==
He made his debut with the Kamal Haasan starrer Ashtamangalyam in 1977. Gopikumar has directed ten films. His brothers P. Chandrakumar and P. Sukumar are also Malayalam film directors.

Gopikumar's major films were Harshabashpam, Manoradham, Pichipoo, Ival Oru Naadody and Thaliritta Kinakkal starring Bollywood actors Tanuja and Madhu Malini, that also had a sound track of Mohammed Rafi. His 1981 film Kaattupothu starring Madhu and Shankar that had chartbusters, failed to get a theatrical release.

Gopikumar's tried to make a comeback with Saudhamini (2003), a film he directed after 22 years, starring Jagadish, Krishna and Captain Raju failed at the box office.

== Death ==
P.Gopikumar died at Palakkad due to decrepitude.

== Filmography ==
- Ashtamangalyam (1977)
- Harshabaashpam (1977)
- Manoradham (1978)
- Pichipoo (1978)
- Ival Oru Naadodi (1979)
- Kannukal (1979)
- Thaliritta Kinakkal (1980)
- Kaattupothu (1981)
- Arayannam (1981)
- Saudhamini (2003)
