= Rashtram =

2006 Malayalam film

- DVD cover
- Directed by: Anil C. Menon
- Written by: Sajeevan
- Produced by: C. Karunakaran
- Starring: Suresh Gopi; Madhu; Sai Kumar; Nedumudi Venu
- Cinematography: Jibu Jacob
- Edited by: Don Max
- Music by: Deepak Dev (songs); S. P. Venkatesh (score)
- Production company: Carlton Films
- Release date: 17 March 2006
- Country: India
- Language: Malayalam

Rashtram (transl. Nation) is a 2006 Indian Malayalam-language political action film directed by Anil C. Menon and produced by C. Karunakaran. The film stars Suresh Gopi, Laya and Sai Kumar. This movie was above average grosser at the box office.

== Plot ==
Malaikkal Joseph alias Ouseppachan is a politician. The chief minister, Janardhanan Kurup is his friend, along with Gopalan. One day, Janardhanan Kurup dies in hospital after having a heart attack at a meeting. Before dying, he tells Ouseppachan that he wants him to be the next chief minister. Ouseppachan ponders this and calls other people of the Party. In the end, he says that he is unfit and makes his son Thomas alias Thommi, the next chief minister. Thommi sorts out many problems. But corrupt ministers have a grudge against him. They launch an attack on Thommi's house and Ouseppachan is killed by a lorry. Thommi takes revenge by killing them on the Republic Day.

== Cast ==
- Suresh Gopi as Kerala Chief Minister Maliyekkal Thomas Joseph/ Maliyekkal Thommi
- Madhu as Maliyekkal Ouseppachan, Thommi's father and A Gandhian Ideology
- Thilakan as Kerala Opposition Leader M.V. Gopalan, Ouseppachan's Friend
- Nedumudi Venu as Kerala ex-Chief Minister Janardhanan Kurup, Ouseppachan's Friend
- Laya as Dr. Celine George, Thommi's Love Interest
- Janardanan as Keshava Menon, A Politician and Nooruddin's Partner
- Sai Kumar as Nooruddin, A Corrupt Politician and The Main Antagonist
- Vijayaraghavan as Medayil Chandy, A Afgari Smuggler and Nooruddin's Partner
- Adithya Menon as Ameer Musthafa, A International Criminal, Nooruddin's Partner and The Main Antagonist
- Bheeman Raghu as Kerala Health Minister Koshy Cheriyan, Nooruddin's partner
- Meghanathan as Medayil Johnykutty, Chandy's son
- Suresh Krishna as Mukundan Menon, Keshava Menon's son
- Spadikam George as ACP Adiyodi George IPS, Nooruddin's Partner
- Suraj Venjaramoodu Party member, Lonappan, Keshava Menon's P.A.
- V. K. Sreeraman as Kerala Finance Minister M. Varadarajan
- Sona Nair as Maliyekkal Sharitha, Thommi's sister
- K. P. A. C. Lalitha as Maliyekkal Annamma, Thommi's mother
- Pallavi Narayanan as Thommi's niece
- Chali Pala as MLA Geevarghese, Nooruddin's Partner
- Baiju Ezhupunna as Bhadran, Thommi's Partner
- Babu Swamy as M. Aravindakshan IFS, Conservative Of Forest Southern Range
- P. Sreekumar as V. Mathew, Nooruddin's Partner
- Kollam Ajith as Kunjappan, Chandy's Member
- T. P. Madhavan as Govindan Menon
- Prem Prakash as Charles, Thommi's Cousin
- Subair as CI Majeed
- Sadiq as V. Peethambran, High Command Party Leader
- Ponnamma Babu as Gomati Pilla, Keshava Menon's Member

== Soundtrack ==
The music was composed by Deepak Dev.

No.	Song	Singers	Lyrics	Length (m:ss)
1	Oru Koodi Mangalam	K. J. Yesudas, Rachana John	Kaithapram	04:09
2	Puthu Vasantham	Vineeth Sreenivasan, Chorus	Kaithapram	04:20
3	Oru Koodi (Slow)	K. J. Yesudas, Rachana John	Kaithapram	04:24
4	Rasthram Theme	Instrumental Andrew Agnew, Luke Toulson, Chris Corcoran, Felix, Bella, Justin Fletcher, Brian Herring, Kris Marshall, Makka Pakka,	Kaithapram	02:24
