= Deepam (film) =

- Directed by: P. Chandrakumar
- Written by: Joseph Madappally
- Screenplay by: Joseph Madappally
- Produced by: Renji Mathew
- Starring: Madhu; Jayan; Srividya; Seema
- Cinematography: N. Vijayakumar
- Edited by: G. Venkittaraman
- Music by: Shyam
- Production company: Praveen Pictures
- Distributed by: Praveen Pictures
- Release date: 14 November 1980
- Country: India
- Language: Malayalam

Deepam (transl. Light) is a 1980 Indian Malayalam film, directed by P. Chandrakumar and produced by Renji Mathew. The film stars Madhu, Jayan, Srividya and Seema in the lead roles. The film has musical score by Shyam. The film was a remake of the Hindi film Main Tulsi Tere Aangan Ki.

== Cast ==
- Madhu as Mr. Varma
- Jayan as Ajaykumar
- Srividya as Padmini
- Seema as Thulasi
- Sukumari as Varma's Mother
- Praveena as Geetha
- Sathaar as Prathap
- Baby Sangeetha
- Mala Aravindan as Subrahmanyam
- Master Naveen
- Priya as Mini
- T. P. Madhavan as Geetha's Father
- Vanchiyoor Radha as Bhargavi
- Vallathol Unnikrishnan
- Radhadevi
- sathyachithra

== Soundtrack ==
The music was composed by Shyam and the lyrics were written by Sathyan Anthikkad.

No.	Song	Singers	Lyrics	Length (m:ss)
1	"Doore Pranaya Kavitha"	P. Jayachandran	Sathyan Anthikkad	
2	"Ee Raagadeepam"	Vani Jairam	Sathyan Anthikkad	
3	"Ee Raagadeepam"	P. Susheela	Sathyan Anthikkad	
4	"Hey Nin Hridanthamo"	Ambili	Sathyan Anthikkad	
5	"Pavizhavum Muthum"	Vani Jairam	Sathyan Anthikkad	
