= Bhavani (actress) =

Indian actress

- Born: Chennai, India
- Occupation: Actress
- Years active: 1974–present
- Spouse: Reghu Kumar (Music director )

Bhavani is an Indian film and television actress best known for her work in Malayalam, Kannada, Tamil and Telugu cinema. She was the lead actress in the Telugu film industry.

== Personal life ==
Born in Chennai and was married Malayalam producer/music director Reghu Kumar, known for films like Thalavattam and Hello My Dear Wrong Number. They had two daughters: Bavitha and Bhavana. She made a comeback through the Malayalam film Narendran Makan Jayakanthan Vaka. Currently, she is acting in Tamil serials. She is a granddaughter of Telugu actress singer Rushyendramani. Her mother tongue is Telugu.

== Career ==
Bhavani's debut film was the Kannada-language Bhootayyana Maga Ayyu (1974), which won her the Best Actress award and in which she shared screen space with legendary actress, mentor and maternal grandmother Rushyendramani, who received the Best Supporting Actress award for the same film. With 75 films in a span of four years to her credit, Bhavani was considered as one of the leading actresses during the 1970s in the Tamil, Kannada, Telugu and Malayalam film industries. She also has the distinction of acting with veteran actors like Prem Nazir, Jayan, and Sukumaran in Malayalam, Vishnuvardhan and Rajinikanth in Kannada, R. Muthuraman, Jaishankar, M. G. Ramachandran, and Sivaji Ganesan in Tamil, and N. T. Rama Rao, Chandramohan, Nandamuri Balakrishna, and Sridhar in Telugu. She was noted for her performance in the Malayalam movie Lisa. Currently she is busy in TV series doing mother and negative roles.

== Filmography ==
Year	Film	Language	Role	Notes
1974	Bhootayyana Maga Ayyu	Kannada		Debut film
1975	Onde Roopa Eradu Guna	Kannada		
1975	Nagakanye	Kannada		
1975	Manthra Sakthi	Kannada		
1975	Koodi Balona	Kannada		
1975	Kalla Kulla	Kannada		
1976	Apoorva Kanasu	Kannada		
1976	Mangalya Bhagya	Kannada		
1976	Uzhaikkum Karangal	Tamil	Kumari Pankajam	Tamil debut
1976	Bhadrakali	Tamil	Jayanthi	
1976	Vanaja Girija	Telugu		Telugu debut
1977	Shani Prabhava	Kannada		
1977	Sri Renukadevi Mahathme	Kannada		
1977	Sahodarara Savaal	Kannada		
1977	Bhanasankari	Kannada		
1977	Aasai Manaivi	Tamil		
1977	Sonnathai Seiven	Tamil		
1977	Seeta Geeta Daatithe	Telugu	Deepa	
1977	Sri Madvirata Parvam	Telugu	Uttara	
1978	Pichipoo	Malayalam		
1978	Ashtamudikkaayal	Malayalam		
1978	Mattoru Karnan	Malayalam		
1978	Lisa	Malayalam	P. Lakshmi	
1978	Ammuvinte Attinkutti	Malayalam		
1978	Sthree Oru Dukham	Malayalam		
1978	Ninakku Njaanum Enikku Neeyum	Malayalam	Lakshmi	
1978	Kalpavriksham	Malayalam	Sreedevi	Malayalam debut
1978	Vamsha Jyothi	Kannada		
1978	Punniya Boomi	Tamil		
1978	Alli Darbar	Tamil	Lily	
1978	Varuvan Vadivelan	Tamil		
1978	Aval Oru Pachaikuzhandhai	Tamil		
1979	Pratheeksha	Malayalam		
1979	Pambaram	Malayalam	Geetha	
1979	Sarppam	Malayalam	Saheera	
1979	Vaaleduthavan Vaalaal	Malayalam		
1979	Anupallavi	Malayalam	Malini	
1979	Mochanam	Malayalam	Jaanu	
1979	Pareeksha	Malayalam		
1979	Sarapancharam	Malayalam	Malli	
1979	Ival Oru Nadodi	Malayalam		
1979	Itha Oru Theeram	Malayalam	Valsala	
1979	Maamaankam	Malayalam	Suhara	
1979	Neelathamara	Malayalam	Ratnam	
1979	Choola	Malayalam		
1980	Muthuchippikal	Malayalam	Devu	
1980	Saraswatheeyaamam	Malayalam	Shalini	
1982	Erattai Manithan	Tamil	Bhavani	
1997	Vammo Vatto O Pellaamo	Telugu		
2001	Narendran Makan Jayakanthan Vaka	Malayalam	Vinodhini's mother	
2002	Thandavam	Malayalam	Swaminathan's wife	
2003	Balettan	Malayalam	Devaki's mother	
2004	Kerala House Udan Vilpanakku	Malayalam	Dinesh's mother	
2004	Kanninum Kannadikkum	Malayalam	Abhirami's mother	
2005	Pauran	Malayalam	Lalithambika	
2005	Katha	Malayalam	Nandhan's mother	
2006	Kalabham	Malayalam	Lakshmi (Lachu)	
2013	Sillunu Oru Sandhippu	Tamil		

== Television ==
Year	Serial	Channel	Language	Notes
2000	Vivaahitha	Asianet	Malayalam	
2003	Parvathy	Surya TV	Malayalam	
2005	Kadamattathu Kathanaar	Asianet	Malayalam	
2005	Vasantham	Sun TV	Tamil	
2005-2006	Selvi	Sun TV	Tamil	
2008-2010	Paarijatham	Asianet	Malayalam	
2009-2010	Sundarakanda	Gemini TV	Telugu	
2009	Kalyanam	Sun TV	Tamil	
2010	Abirami	Kalaignar TV	Tamil	
2010	Ilavarasi	Sun TV	Tamil	
2010	Mundhanai Mudichu	Sun TV	Tamil	Replaced by Rekha Suresh
2011	Muthaaram	Sun TV	Tamil	Replaced by J.Lalitha
2011-2012	Paarijatham	Vijay TV	Tamil	
2012-2013	Valli	Sun TV	Tamil	
2012-2013	Pokkisham	Kalaingar TV	Tamil	
2012	Parijata	Star Suvarna	Kannada	
2013-2014	Bhagyadevatha	Mazhavil Manorama	Malayalam	
2013-2014	Deivamagal	Sun TV	Tamil	
2014	Kalyana Parisu	Sun TV	Tamil	Replaced by Dharini
2014	Akka Thangai	Kalignar TV	Tamil	
2014-2015	Andal Azhagar	Vijay TV	Tamil	Replaced by Shanthi Williams
2015-2017	Kairasi Kudumbam	Jaya TV	Tamil	
2020	Ninne Pelladatha	Zee Telugu	Telugu	
