= Asthamayam =

1978 film directed by P. Chandrakumar

- Theatrical Poster
- Directed by: P. Chandrakumar
- Written by: Sarah Thomas
- Produced by: Madhu
- Starring: Madhu; Jayan; Sharada; Jayabharathi
- Edited by: G. Venkittaraman
- Music by: Shyam
- Production company: Uma Arts
- Distributed by: Uma Arts
- Release date: 27 September 1978
- Country: India
- Language: Malayalam

Asthamayam is a 1978 Indian Malayalam-language film, directed by P. Chandrakumar and produced by Madhu. The film stars Madhu, Jayan, Sharada and Jayabharathi. The film has musical score by Shyam.

== Plot ==
Balakrishnan and Venu were classmates and close friends at the medical college. Venu is athletic and outgoing while Balan focused on academics.

Balakrishnan becomes a busy doctor practicing in the city while Venu joins the military. Venu sends his uncle, Kuruppu, accompanied by daughter Shanthi for treatment to Balakrishnan who accommodates them at home waiting for the results of medical examination. Shanti develops feelings towards Balakrishnan. Kuruppu is diagnosed with stomach tumour requiring surgical removal.Kuruppu and Shanthi leaves after successful treatment. Later, Kuruppu seeks an alliance of marriage between Shanthi and Balakrishnan through the latter's brother. Balakrishnan agrees to wedding on his brother's insistence.

Years later, Balakrishnan and Shanti are leading a happy married life with a 3-year-old daughter named Prabha. An old lover, Prabha, visits Doctor Balakrishnan in a weakened state. She is teapped in an unhappy marriage. Balan admits her for treatment. This brings back old memories.

Prabha was a dancer in the college with so many suitors. Balan gets into a spat with one of other students, Chandran, over Prabha. Venu beats up Chandran and gets dismissed from college. The couple plans to visit Kanyakumari to enjoy the sunset. But Prabha's father coerced her to marry Persian based businessman Menon. In Persia, Prabha struggles to adjust with Menon's social life. Menon unsatisfied with Prabha pursues other women openly. Prabha falls ill and no doctor is able to diagnose and she is sent back to India.

Prabha's condition deteriorate and she expresses her wish to visit Kanyakumari. Balakrishnan agrees to take her as this could be her last wish. After viewing the sunset together, Prabha dies that night. But her spirit visits Balans family.

== Cast ==
- Madhu as Doctor Balakrishnan MBBS, FRCS (London)
- Sharada as Shanthi
- Jayabharathi as Prabha Menon
- Jayan as Venu.
- Thikkurissy Sukumaran Nair as Kuruppu
- Jose Prakash as Venu's brother
- T. P. Madhavan as Mr. Menon
- Sankaradi as Swami
- Bahadoor as Attender Kuttan Pillai
- Mala Aravindan as Attender Guharajan
- Kunchan as Sundaran
- Poojappura Ravi
- Sukumari as Alamelu

== Soundtrack ==
The music was composed by Shyam and the lyrics were written by Sreekumaran Thampi and Sathyan Anthikkad.

No.	Song	Singers	Lyrics	Length (m:ss)
1	"Asthamayam Asthamayam"	K. J. Yesudas, Chorus	Sreekumaran Thampi	
2	"Oru Premagaanam Paadi"	K. J. Yesudas	Sathyan Anthikkad	
3	"Paal Pozhiyum Mozhi"	P. Jayachandran, Vani Jairam	Sreekumaran Thampi	
4	"Rathilayam Rathilayam"	K. J. Yesudas, S. Janaki	Sathyan Anthikkad	
