= Pichipoo =

- Directed by: P. Gopikumar
- Written by: Maharshi; Thoppil Bhasi (dialogues)
- Screenplay by: Thoppil Bhasi
- Starring: P. Bhaskaran; Sukumari; Kaviyoor Ponnamma; KPAC Lalitha
- Cinematography: Madhu Ambatt
- Edited by: K. Sankunni
- Music by: Jaya Vijaya
- Production company: Mary Matha Productions
- Distributed by: Mary Matha Productions
- Release date: 14 July 1978
- Country: India
- Language: Malayalam

Pichipoo is a 1978 Indian Malayalam-language film, directed by P. Gopikumar. The film stars P. Bhaskaran, Sukumari, Kaviyoor Ponnamma and KPAC Lalitha. The film's score was composed by Jaya Vijaya. The film was a remake of the Tamil film Bhadrakali (1976).

== Cast ==
- P. Bhaskaran
- Sukumari
- Kaviyoor Ponnamma
- KPAC Lalitha
- Sukumaran
- Vidhubala
- Bhavani

== Soundtrack ==
The music was composed by Jaya Vijaya with lyrics by P. Bhaskaran.

No.	Song	Singers	Lyrics	Length (m:ss)
1	"Annu Kandaneram"	K. J. Yesudas	P. Bhaskaran	
2	"Bhavabhaya Vinaashini"	P. Leela	P. Bhaskaran	
3	"Kaamadevan Karimbinaal"	S. Janaki	P. Bhaskaran	
4	"Kalyaanamelam Kelkumbol"	K. J. Yesudas	P. Bhaskaran	
5	"Omanakuttan Govindan"	K. J. Yesudas, Vani Jairam	P. Bhaskaran	
