= Ival Oru Naadody =

- Directed by: P. Gopikumar
- Written by: Dr. Shajahan; Latheesh Kumar (dialogues)
- Starring: Jayabharathi; Sukumaran; Raghavan; Bhavani
- Cinematography: Vipin Das; Anandakuttan
- Edited by: M. N. Appu
- Music by: S. D. Sekhar
- Production company: Deepthivarsha
- Distributed by: Deepthivarsha
- Release date: 2 February 1979
- Country: India
- Language: Malayalam

Ival Oru Naadody (transl. She Is A Nomad) is a 1979 Indian Malayalam-language film directed by P. Gopikumar. The film stars Jayabharathi, Sukumaran, Raghavan and Bhavani. It has a musical score by S. D. Sekhar.

== Cast ==
- Jayabharathi
- Sukumaran
- Raghavan
- Bhavani
- K. P. A. C. Azeez
- Bobby Kottarakkara
- K. P. Ummer
- Kuthiravattam Pappu
- Mala Aravindan
- P. R. Varalakshmi
- Zeenath
- Baby Sonia
- Vincent
- R. Balakrishna Pillai

== Soundtrack ==
The music was composed by S. D. Sekhar and the lyrics were written by Dr. Shajahan, who also penned the dialogues.

| No. | Song | Singers | Lyrics | Length (m:ss) |
|---|---|---|---|---|
| 1 | "Anuraagapraayathil" | P. Jayachandran | Dr. Shajahan | |
| 2 | "Hoy Hoy Hoy" | Vani Jairam | Dr. Shajahan | |
| 3 | "Manmadha Manjariyil Pookkum" | S. Janaki, Malaysia Vasudevan | Dr. Shajahan | |
| 4 | "Parannu Parannu Po" | K. J. Yesudas | Dr. Shajahan | |
