= Dheepam =

- Poster
- Directed by: K. Vijayan
- Written by: A. L. Narayanan (dialogues)
- Story by: Thoppil Bhasi
- Produced by: K. Balaji
- Starring: Sivaji Ganesan; Sujatha; Vijayakumar; Sangeetha
- Cinematography: G. Or. Nathan
- Edited by: B. Kanthasamy
- Music by: Ilaiyaraaja
- Production company: Suresh Arts
- Release date: 26 January 1977
- Country: India
- Language: Tamil

Dheepam (transl. Lamp) is a 1977 Indian Tamil-language film, directed by K. Vijayan and produced by K. Balaji. The film stars Sivaji Ganesan, Sujatha, Vijayakumar and Sangeetha. It is a remake of the Malayalam film Theekkanal. The film was released on 26 January 1977, and ran for over 100 days in theatres.

== Plot ==
Somu and Kannan are brothers. During a small fight, Somu injures Kannan and believing him to be dead runs away from home. Somu is taken in Raja the elder, who adopts him as a son, also naming him Raja. The younger Raja becomes a smuggler. Before dying, the father hands over everything he has to Somu, now Raja, including his daughter Latha for him to take care her. However, due to their shady business, he is unable to find a groom for her.

Radha is Latha's friend and Raja is in love with her. She however shuns him for the same reason as others. They both meet Kannan and take a liking to him. Soon, Raja realises Kannan is his brother and showers love and riches on him. When he finds out Radha and Kannan are in love, he solemnises their marriage too. However, soon, Radha and Kannan start to suspect Raja's true intentions driving Kannan to drinking. Unable to declare the true relationship between Kannan and him as it would ruin the life of his sister who absolutely believes that he is everything in addition to him giving his word that he will never reveal that he is not her brother to their father, he takes on all the abuse. In the end, he kills himself to solve all problems asking Kannan to arrange for Latha's marriage.

== Cast ==
- Sivaji Ganesan as Somu / Raja
- Sujatha as Radha
- Vijayakumar as Kannan
- Sangeetha as Latha
- K. Balaji as Photographer
- Padmini as Kannan's mother (Guest Appearance)
- Sathyapriya as Asha
- Major Sundarrajan as Raja
- S. V. Subbaiah as Ramaiya
- S. V. Ramadas as Vasu
- Nagesh as Rahim Bai
- Suruli Rajan as karups
- Manorama as Rama
- Sachu as Palakadu Bama
- Y. G. Mahendran

== Production ==
Devaraj–Mohan were originally chosen to direct the film but they left due to not liking the plot; hence Vijayan replaced them as director.

== Soundtrack ==
The music was composed by Ilaiyaraaja, with lyrics by Pulamaipithan. The song "Anthapurathil Oru" is set in Mayamalavagowla raga, and "Poovizhi Vaasalil" is set in Yamunakalyani. This film was to have been Ilaiyaraaja's debut before Annakili (1976) was released.

Song	Singers	Length
"Poovizhi Vaasalil"	K. J. Yesudas, Janaki	04.32
"Anthapuratthil Oru"	T. M. Soundararajan, Janaki	04.13
"Pesaathe"	T. M. Soundararajan	04.03
"Raaja Yuva Raaja"	T. M. Soundararajan	04.27

== Reception ==
Kanthan of Kalki praised the performances of Ganesan and other actors and Vijayan's direction but felt the comedy sequences of Manorama were unnecessary. Free India lauded the cast performances, cinematography, background score and direction.

== Bibliography ==
- Sundararaman (2007) [2005]. Raga Chintamani: A Guide to Carnatic Ragas Through Tamil Film Music (2nd ed.). Pichhamal Chintamani. OCLC 295034757.
