= Aparadhi (1977 film) =

- Directed by: P. N. Sundaram
- Written by: Deputy Superintendent of Police (Retd) Joseph Louis Meyn; V. T. Nandakumar (dialogues)
- Screenplay by: V. T. Nandakumar
- Produced by: Pavamani
- Starring: Prem Nazir; Madhu; Sheela; Jayabharathi; KP Ummer
- Cinematography: S. S. Maniyan
- Edited by: G. Venkittaraman
- Music by: Salil Chowdhary
- Production company: Prathap Chithra
- Distributed by: Prathap Chithra
- Release date: 10 February 1977
- Country: India
- Language: Malayalam

Aparadhi is a 1977 Indian Malayalam-language film directed by P. N. Sundaram and produced by Pavamani. The film stars Prem Nazir, Madhu, Sheela and Jayabharathi in the lead roles. The film has musical score by Salil Chowdhary. The film was a commercial success.

== Cast ==
- Madhu as Jayachandran
- Prem Nazir as Circle Inspector Rajan
- K. P. Ummer as Johnson
- Sheela as Susheela
- Jayabharathi as Lissy
- Ashalatha
- Bahadoor as Ouseppachan
- Prathapachandran as Jayachandran's Father
- Baby Babitha as Annie (Lissy's Daughter)
- Balan K. Nair as Malayi Kunjumon
- Master Raghu as Raju (Lissy's Son)
- Master Sujith as Babu
- Nanditha Bose as Sumathi
- P. S. Radhika as Thresia
- P. K. Abraham as DSP
- Paravoor Bharathan as Tea Shop Owner Raman Nair
- Santha Devi
- T. P. Madhavan as Police Officer Kumaran
- Veeran as Shankara Pillai (Susheela's Father)
- R. K. Nair as Constable
- Thrissur Elsy
- Nagesh as Goldsmith Rankan
- Kedamangalam Ali
- Victory Janardhanan
- C A Balan
- J R Anand
- LalithaSree
- Prajatha
- Meena Ilene Meyn

== Soundtrack ==
The music was composed by Salil Chowdhary and the lyrics were written by P. Bhaskaran.

No.	Song	Singers	Lyrics	Length (m:ss)
1	"Maamalayile Poomaram"	Vani Jairam, Chorus, Jolly Abraham	P. Bhaskaran	
2	"Muraleedhara Mukunda"	S. Janaki, Chorus	P. Bhaskaran	
3	"Nanma Nerum Amma"	Sujatha Mohan, Latha Raju, Master Sreejith	P. Bhaskaran	
4	"Thumbi Thumbi"	Sujatha Mohan, Ambili, Chorus	P. Bhaskaran	
