= Sujatha Mohan =

Indian playback singer (born 1963)

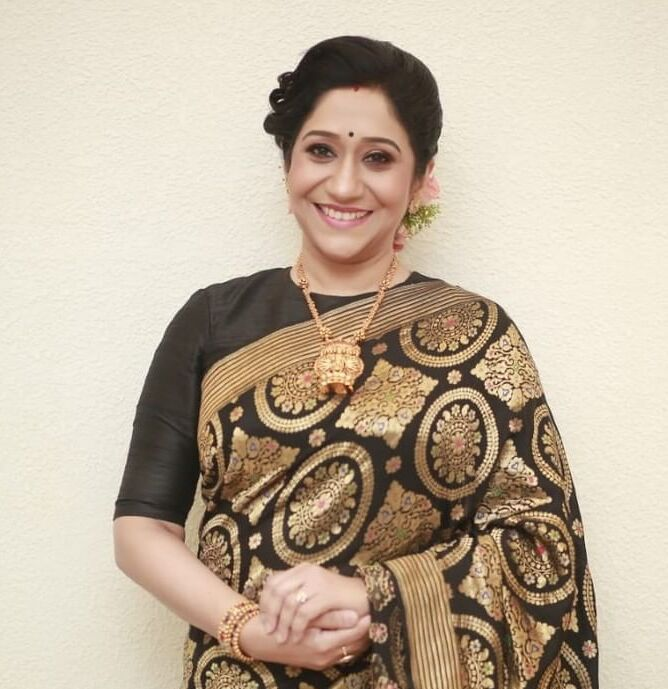
- Sujatha at an event

Background information
- Born: 31 March 1963 (age 63); Kochi, Kerala, India
- Genre: Playback
- Occupation: Playback singer
- Years active: 1975–1981; 1988–present
- Labels: Tharangini; Satyam; Magnasound; East Coast; Souparnika
- Spouse: V. Krishna Mohan (m. 1981)
- Children: Shweta Mohan
- Relatives: Paravoor T. K. Narayana Pillai (grandfather); G. Venugopal (cousin); Radhika Thilak (cousin)
- Website: sujathamohan.com

Sujatha Mohan (born 31 March 1963) is an Indian playback singer whose work has had a significant presence across several South Indian film industries, particularly Malayalam, Tamil, and Telugu cinema. She has also recorded songs in Kannada, Badaga, Hindi, and Marathi language films. Introduced to formal music training at a young age, she began performing on stage as a child and first appeared alongside renowned singer K. J. Yesudas in 1973. She is referred to as Bhava Gayika (Singer of Emotions) in Kerala for her emotive singing, and Innisai Kuyil (Nightingale of Music) in Tamil Nadu, reflecting her sweet and expressive vocal style.

Sujatha made her film playback debut in Malayalam cinema while singing as a young child artist (often credited back then as "Baby Sujatha") in 1975 with composer M. K. Arjunan for the film Tourist Bungalow and later entered Tamil cinema in 1977, collaborating with composer Ilaiyaraaja for the soundtracks of Kavikkuyil and Gaayathri. Her association with Kavikkuyil became particularly notable, and she came to be popularly known as “Kavikkuyil Sujatha” in Sri Lanka (then Ceylon). After a brief sabbatical, Sujatha rose to fame after her association with A. R. Rahman for the soundtracks of the film Roja (1992). Over the years, she became widely recognized for her contributions to film music, including her collaborations with leading composers across South Indian film industries. With a singing career spanning more than five decades, she has recorded over 18,000 songs across films, devotional music, and independent albums, making her one of the most prolific voices in Indian music.

Throughout her career, Sujatha has received several accolades, including the Kerala State Film Award for Best Singer thrice, the Tamil Nadu State Film Award for Best Female Playback Singer thrice, the SIIMA for Best Female Playback Singer, the Kalaimamani award (2019) from Government of Tamil Nadu and the Swaralaya Yesudas Award (2009) among many others.

== Personal life ==
Sujatha is the granddaughter of Paravoor T. K. Narayana Pillai, the first Chief Minister of the erstwhile State of Travancore–Cochin after India gained Independence. Her father, the late Dr. Vijayendran, died when she was two years old. She completed her graduation in Economics from the St. Teresa's College, Ernakulam. She married Dr. V. Krishna Mohan on 9 May 1981. Her only daughter, Shweta Mohan, is also a singer. Radhika Thilak and G. Venugopal are her cousins.

=== Vocal struggles ===
Sujatha experienced severe vocal issues for three years in the late 2010s. She struggled even to speak, making it impossible for her to take up singing assignments.

Though she was unable to perform initially, she worked extensively to regain her voice and eventually resumed singing, including recording songs again.

== Career ==
Sujatha Mohan first gained public recognition in the 1970s as “Baby Sujatha,” a young vocalist who frequently performed alongside singer K. J. Yesudas at stage concerts across India and overseas. She made her playback singing debut while still in school, recording the song “Kannezhuthi Pottuthottu” for the 1975 Malayalam film Tourist Bungalow, composed by M. K. Arjunan. During the same period, she also recorded songs for composers such as Shyam in Kamam Krodham Moham (1975) and Salil Chowdhury in Aparadhi (1977), while collaborating extensively with M. G. Radhakrishnan on non-film music. Among these recordings, “Odakkuzhal Vili” emerged as one of her early popular successes.

Her entry into Tamil cinema came through a song composed by Ilaiyaraaja for Kavikkuyil (1977), although it was not included in the final film. Her first released Tamil song was “Kalai Paniyil” from Gaayathri (1977), featuring Sridevi and Rajinikanth. She subsequently contributed to several of Ilaiyaraaja’s notable soundtracks, including "Oru Iniya Manathu" from Johnny (1980) and Ilamai Kolam (1980). Following her marriage in 1981, Sujatha took a break from playback singing before returning to the industry in 1988. Her comeback was marked by successful projects such as Kadathanadan Ambadi (released 1990) and the widely acclaimed Chithram (1988).

In the late 1980s, Sujatha worked extensively in the advertising industry, recording commercial jingles for composer A. R. Rahman, including campaigns such as the Premier Cooker and Tilda Rice advertisements. This association later led to one of the defining moments of her career when Rahman selected her to perform "Pudhu Vellai Mazhai" for Mani Ratnam’s 1992 film Roja. The song became a landmark success and played a significant role in bringing her voice to a wider audience across India. Sujatha also provided the backing vocals for "Kadhal Roja" from the same soundtrack. Over the following years, she continued to collaborate with Rahman on a number of acclaimed film projects, contributing memorable songs to soundtracks such as Pudhiya Mugam (1993), Gentleman (1993), Minsaara Kanavu (1997), Ratchagan (1997) and Jeans (1998). The collaboration produced songs in Hindi cinema as well, including "Dil Hai Sanam" (the Hindi version of "Thee Thee") from Chor Chor (Thiruda Thiruda), "Ishq Bina" from Taal (1999), "Hai Jaana" from Pukar (2000) and "Ishwar Allah" from Earth (1998), and provided backing vocals for the song "Tum Ho Meri Nigahon" from Kabhi Na Kabhi (1999). She has delivered most of her notable and successful songs under the musical direction of Rahman.

She has worked extensively with leading composers in India including Raveendran, Johnson, Ouseppachan, Deva, S. P. Venkatesh, Kannur Rajan, M. M. Keeravani, Sirpy, Koti, Vidyasagar, Sharreth, S. A. Rajkumar, Hamsalekha, Mani Sharma, Karthik Raja, Bharadwaj, Yuvan Shankar Raja among many others and has recorded maximum duet songs with K. J. Yesudas, M. G. Sreekumar, Hariharan, S. P. Balasubrahmanyam and Unnikrishnan. She made a strong comeback in the Malayalam film industry in the mid-1990s and most of her notable Malayalam songs were composed by Vidyasagar. Additionally, most of her hit songs from Telugu were composed by Mani Sharma.

== Awards and accolades ==
Sujatha has received several awards and recognitions for her work in the South Indian film musical world. In 2021, she was awarded the Kalaimamani award by the Government of Indian state Tamil Nadu for the year 2019. She has also received Kerala and Tamil Nadu state awards.

=== Kerala State Film Awards ===
Year	Category	Film	Song
1996	Best Female Playback Singer	Azhakiya Ravanan	"Pranayamani Thooval"
1998	Best Female Playback Singer	Pranayavarnangal	"Varamanjaladiya"
2006	Best Female Playback Singer	Rathri Mazha	"Baasuri"

=== Tamil Nadu State Film Awards ===
Year	Category	Film(s)	Song(s)
1993	Best Female Playback Singer	Pudhiya Mugam, Gentleman	"Netru Illatha Mathram" "En Veetil Thottathil"
1996	Best Female Playback Singer	Minsara Kanavu, Avvai Shanmugi	"Poo Pookum Osai" "Rukku Rukku"
2001	Best Female Playback Singer	Dhill	"Un Samayil Arayil"

=== Kerala Film Critics Association Awards ===
Year	Category	Film	Song	Ref.
1988	Best Female Playback Singer	Chithram	"Doore Kizhakkudikkum", "Paadam Koyyum Munpe", "Kaadumi Naadumellam"	
1989	Best Female Playback Singer	Vandanam	"Meghangale", "Anthiponvettam"	
1990	Best Female Playback Singer	Malootty	"Mounathin Idanaazhiyil", "Swargangal Swapnam Kaanum"	
1991	Best Female Playback Singer	Kizhakkunarum Pakshi, Kankettu	"Kizhakunarumpakshi", "Gopeehridayam Nirayunnu"	
1992	Best Female Playback Singer	Ulsavamelam	"Ammakkoru Ponnumkudam"	
1993	Best Female Playback Singer	Meleparambil Anveedu, Dhruvam, Chenkol	"Madhura Swapnangal", "Thumbippenne", "Pathira Paalkadavil"	
1995	Best Female Playback Singer	Oru Abhibhashakante Case Diary	"Kanikkonnakal"	
1996	Best Female Playback Singer	Azhakiya Ravanan, Desadanam, Ee Puzhayum Kadannu	"Pranayamanithooval", "Engane Njan", "Kaakka Karumban"	
1997	Best Female Playback Singer	Rishyasringan, Superman, Shibiram	"Guru Brahma", "Onathumbi paadu", "Paadum Vaanampaadi"	
1998	Best Female Playback Singer	Pranayavarnangal, Janani	"Varamanjalaadiya", "Manjadi Manikkutta"	
1999	Best Female Playback Singer	Chandranudikkunna Dikkil, Saaphalyam	"Manju Peyyana", "Ambadi Payyukal", "Ponnolappanthalil"	
2001	Best Female Playback Singer	Soothradharan, Pularvettam	"Perariyam", "Raavil Aaro", "Ithile ithile"	
2003	Best Female Playback Singer	Vellithira, Kasthooriman	"Kudamulla Kadavil", "Azhage", "Karkuzhali"	
2004	Best Female Playback Singer	Thudakkam	"Amme Ennoru"	
2005	Best Female Playback Singer	Paranju Theeratha Visheshangal	"Paadaanum"	

=== South Indian International Movie Awards ===
Year	Category	Film	Song
2022	Best Female Playback Singer	The Priest	"Neelambale"

=== Other prominent awards and nominations ===
- 1997 - Dinakaran Cinema Awards for Best Female Playback Singer - Surya Vamsam
- 1997 - Cinema Express Awards for Best Female Playback Singer - Surya Vamsam
- 1998 - Dinakaran Cinema Awards for Best Female Playback Singer - Unnidathil Ennai Koduthen
- 2015 – Asiavision Awards for Best Female Playback Singer – Ottamandaram
- 2014 – Thikkurishi Award (shared with Shewta) for movie Ottamandaram
- 2013 – JFW magazine Women Achievers Award
- 2009 – Swaralaya Yesudas Award
- 2008 – Best female singer award in GMMA (Gulf Malayalam Music Awards)
- The Film Critics award 11 times
- Raju Pilakkad Film Award
- South Indian Bank women's achiever's award 2017
- Mirchi Music Awards 2018: Lifetime achievement
- Kamukara Purushothaman Kamukara Award 2019: Lifetime achievement (award from P. Susheela)
- Kalaimamani Award - 2019

== TV shows ==
Mohan has judged popular reality shows over South Indian television across Malayalam and Tamil languages.

As judge

Year	Title	Channel	Language	Notes
2008-2009	Airtel Super Singer 2	Star Vijay	Tamil	
2008-2009	Star Singer Junior	Asianet	Malayalam	
2010–2011	Airtel Super Singer 3	Star Vijay	Tamil	
2010–2011	Star Singer Junior 2	Asianet	Malayalam	
2013	Indian Voice	Mazhavil Manorama	Malayalam	
2013–2014	Airtel Super Singer 4	Star Vijay	Tamil	
2013–2014	Indian Voice season 2	Mazhavil Manorama	Malayalam	
2014	Surya Singer	Surya TV	Malayalam	
2016	Super Star Junior 5	Amrita TV	Malayalam	
2016-2017	Sa Re Ga Ma Pa Lil Champs	Zee Tamil	Tamil	
2017-2018	Sa Re Ga Ma Pa Seniors	Zee Tamil	Tamil	
2018	Super 4	Mazhavil Manorama	Malayalam	
2018	Sa Re Ga Ma Pa Lil Champs 2	Zee Tamil	Tamil	
2019	Sa Re Ga Ma Pa Seniors season 2	Zee Tamil	Tamil	
2019–2020	Sa Re Ga Ma Pa Keralam	Zee Keralam	Malayalam	
2021–2022	Sa Re Ga Ma Pa Li'l Champs	Zee Keralam	Malayalam	
2022	Star Singer Junior 3	Asianet	Malayalam	launch episode
2023	Top Singer 3	flowers TV	Malayalam	
2023-2024	Sa Re Ga Ma Pa Keralam 2	Zee Keralam	Malayalam	
2023	Shyamambaram	Zee Keralam	Malayalam	TV serial (cameo appearance)
2023-2024	Super Singer 10	Star Vijay	Tamil	
2024	Top Singer 4	Flowers TV	Malayalam	
2025	Sa Re Ga Ma Pa Keralam 3	Zee Keralam	Malayalam	
2026	Sa Re Ga Ma Pa Li'l Champs 2	Zee Keralam	Malayalam	
