= Vamsha Jyothi =

- Directed by: A. Bhimsingh
- Produced by: K. S. Prasad
- Starring: Kalpana; Vishnuvardhan; Rajesh; Hema Choudhary; Bhavani
- Cinematography: Palaniyappan
- Music by: G. K. Venkatesh
- Release date: 1978
- Country: India
- Language: Kannada

Vamsha Jyothi is a 1978 Indian Kannada-language film, directed by A. Bhimsingh and produced by K. S. Prasad. The film stars Kalpana, Vishnuvardhan, Rajesh and Bhavani. The film has musical score by G. K. Venkatesh.

== Cast ==
- Kalpana as Sharada
- Vishnuvardhan as Mahesh
- Lokesh as Sharada's boss
- Rajesh as Shankaraiah
- Chandrashekhar as Srikanth
- Hema Chaudhary as Shobha
- Bhavani
- K. S. Ashwath as Sharada's father
- T. N. Balakrishna as Devayya
- Dwarakish as Virupaksha
- Shylashri
- B. Jaya as Rama
- B. V. Radha as Girija

== Soundtrack ==
The music was composed by G. K. Venkatesh.

No.	Song	Singers	Lyrics	Length (m:ss)
1	"Manasugala Mamatheyali"	S. Janaki	Hunsur Krishnamurthy	03:21
