= P. K. Narayana Pillai =

Indian literary critic (1879–1936)

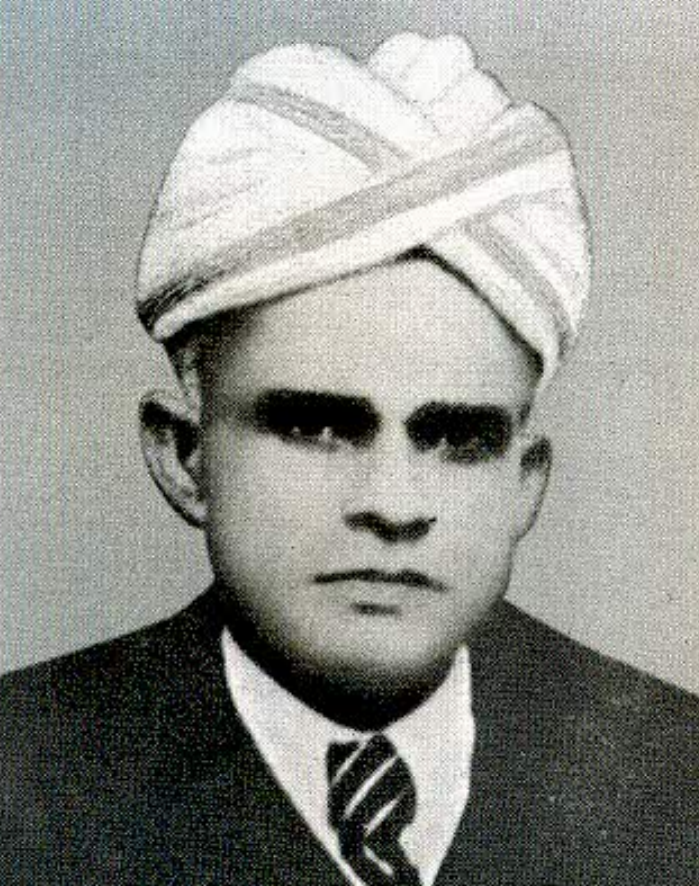
- Born: 21 March 1879; Ambalappuzha, British Raj
- Died: 10 February 1936 (aged 56); Travancore state, British Raj
- Occupations: Literary critic; essayist; scholar; grammarian; poet
- Notable work: Panchananante Vimarsathrayam; Leghuvyakaranam; Vyakarana Pravesika; Sahithya Panchanante Krithikal
- Spouse: Parukutty Amma
- Parents: Damodaran Pillai; Kunjulakshmi Amma

P. K. Narayana Pillai (21 March 1879 – 10 February 1936) was an Indian literary critic, essayist, scholar, grammarian and poet of Malayalam language. One of the pioneers of literary criticism in Malayalam, he wrote more than 25 books which include Panchananante Vimarssthrayam, a critique of the writings of Thunchaththu Ezhuthachan, Cherusseri Namboothiri and Kunchan Nambiar and two books on Malayalam grammar, Leghuvyakaranam and Vyakarana Pravesika. He was a judge of the Kerala High Court, a member of the Sree Moolam Popular Assembly and the founder president of the Samastha Kerala Sahithya Parishad.

== Biography ==
P. K. Narayana Pillai was born during the British Raj on 21 March 1879 at Ambalappuzha in the present-day Alappuzha district of the south Indian state of Kerala to Pozhincheri Madathil Damodaran Pillai and Kadamattuveettil Kunjulakshmi Amma. After completing early education in the traditional way under local teachers such as Chami Pillai Asan, Ananthakrishna Iyer and Raman Asan, he did his formal schooling at Ambalappuzha and passed the 10th standard examination in 1896. His college education was in Thiruvananthapuram where he completed his under graduate studies and after securing a bachelor's degree, he served as a teacher at the government high school and later at the government college in Thiruvananthapuram. Simultaneously, he studied law and after earning a degree, he started practicing as a lawyer in 1909. The next year, he was elected to Sree Moolam Popular Assembly. After practicing law in Kottayam, Alappuzha and Thiruvananthapram, he became a judge of the High Court of Kerala in 1929. Later, he also represented Ambalappuzha in the Sree Moolam Popular Assembly. When Samastha Kerala Sahithya Parishad was established in Kochi, he was selected as its founder president.

Narayana Pillai published over 25 books, mostly literary criticism, and he was one of the pioneers of literary criticism in Malayalam. Panchananante Vimarsathrayam, a critique on the writings of Thunchaththu Ezhuthachan, Cherusseri Namboothiri and Kunchan Nambiar was one of his major works and the book was published by Kerala Sangeetha Nataka Akademi. He also wrote two books on Malayalam grammar, Leghuvyakaranam and Vyakarana Pravesika. A four-volume work, Sahitya Panchanante Kruthikal has been published compiling all his major works.

Narayana Pillai, married to Parukutty Amma, died on 10 February 1936 at the age of 56. A library, P. K. Memorial Library, one of the first libraries in Kerala, was established in his honour by P. N. Panicker, known to be the father of library movement in Kerala, with Panicker serving as its secretary and it was here the representatives of 47 libraries in the state of Travancore met on 16 September 1945 to form the Thiruvithaamkoor Granthasala Sangham (All Travancore Library Association), the first library movement in Kerala. Incidentally, P. K. Memorial Library was the first entry in the association's register. Sahitya Akademi has published Narayana Pillai's biography under the title, Sahitya Panchanan P K Narayana Pillai, written by M. Gopalakrishnan Nair, under the series, Bharathiya Sahitya Silpikal (The Makers of Indian Literature). T. N. Gopinathan Nair, a noted dramatist, was his son, and Ravi Vallathol, a popular film and television actor, was his grandson. The Malayalam movie actor, T. P. Madhavan is another grandson.

== Selected bibliography ==
- K, Narayana Pillai P. (1916). Krishnagatha - Oru Niroopanam (in Malayalam). Kottayam: Central Travancore Bk depot.
- Narayana Pillai, P. K. (1947). Vijnana ranjini / (in Malayalam). SPCS.
- K, Narayana Pillai P. (1950). Pracheena Manipravalam (in Malayalam).
- K, Narayana Pillai P. (1952). Neethisathakam (in Malayalam). Kerala Sarvakalasala.
- Narayana Pillai, P. K. (1955). Bharatha deshiya gaanam / (in Malayalam). Ullur Publishers.
- K, Narayana Pillai P. (1956). Smarana Mandalam (in Malayalam). Trivandrum: Kerala University Co.op.stores.
- Pillai.P.K, Narayana (1965). Sahitheekadaksham (in Malayalam). Ullur Publisher. Archived from the original on 24 April 2019.
- Narayana Pillai, P. K. (1966). Veerajanani/. Kottayam: National Book Stall.
- K, Narayana Pillai P. (1968). Thunchathezhuthachan (in Malayalam). Kottayam: National Book Stall.
- Narayana Pillai, P. K. (1969). Samskara kaudukam / (in Malayalam). Kottayam: S.P.C.S.
- K, Narayana Pillai P. (1970). Unniyachi Charitham (in Malayalam). Kerala Sarvakalasala.
- K, Narayana Pillai P. (1971). Padyaratnam (in Malayalam). Trivandrum: Kerala Sarvakalasala.
- Narayana Pillai, P. K. (1979). The universal light : a poem on Swami Vivekananda, with an English translation (in Sanskrit). Trivandrum: College Book House.
- Narayana Pillai, P. K. (1980). Panchananante vimarssthrayam. Thrissur: Kerala Sangeetha Natak Akademi.
- Narayana Pillai, P. K. (1983). Kairalidwani (in Malayalam). Kottayam: National Book Stall.
- Narayana Pillai, P. K. (1988). Prayogadeepika. Trivandrum: Dept. of Cultural Publications.
- Narayana Pillai, P. K. (1993). Sahithya Panchanante Krithikal (in Malayalam).
- Narayana Pillai, P. K. (1995). Leghuvyakaranam. Thiruvananthapuram: State Institute of Languages.
- Narayana Pillai, P. K. (1995). Vyakarana pravesika. Thiruvananthapuram: State Institute of Languages.
- Narayana Pillai, P. K. (1995). Kavyamekhala: Sahithya Panjanande Padyakrithikal (in Malayalam). Thiruvananthapuram: Lt. Col. T.N.K.Nair.
- K, Narayana Pillai P. Prasanga Tharangini (Part - 1) (in Malayalam). Archived from the original on 24 April 2019.
- Pillai.P.K, Narayana. Prasanga Tharangini Part II (in Malayalam). Archived from the original on 24 April 2019.
- K, Narayana Pillai P. Prayoga Deepika (in Malayalam).
- K, Narayana Pillai P. Kesimadhanam (in Malayalam). Kerala Sarvakalasala.
- K, Narayana Pillai P. Krishnarjjuna yudham (in Malayalam). Kerala Sarvakalasala.

== See also ==
- List of Malayalam-language authors by category
- List of Malayalam-language authors
