= Harshabashpam =

- Directed by: P. Gopikumar
- Written by: Kanam E. J.
- Screenplay by: Kanam EJ
- Produced by: K. H. Khan Sahib
- Starring: K. J. Yesudas; Adoor Bhasi; Bahadoor; Janardanan
- Cinematography: Madhu Ambatt
- Edited by: K. Sankunni
- Music by: M. K. Arjunan
- Production company: Kanthi Harsha
- Distributed by: Kanthi Harsha
- Release date: 3 November 1977
- Country: India
- Language: Malayalam

Harshabashpam is a 1977 Indian Malayalam film, directed by P. Gopikumar and produced by K. H. Khan Sahib. The film stars K. J. Yesudas, Adoor Bhasi, Bahadoor and Janardanan in the lead roles. The film has musical score by M. K. Arjunan.

== Cast ==
- K. J. Yesudas
- Adoor Bhasi
- Bahadoor
- Janardanan
- K. P. Ummer
- M. G. Soman
- Mallika Sukumaran
- Vidhubala

== Soundtrack ==
The music was composed by M. K. Arjunan and the lyrics were written by K. H. Khan Sahib and Kanam E. J.

No.	Song	Singers	Lyrics	Length (m:ss)
1	"Aayiram Kaathamakaleyaanenkilum"	K. J. Yesudas	K. H. Khan Sahib	
2	"Ekaadashi Dinamunarnnu"	Jency	Kanam E. J.	
3	"Thaalappoliyode"	K. J. Yesudas	K. H. Khan Sahib	
4	"Vellappudavayuduthu"	K. J. Yesudas	Kanam E. J.	
