= Aaraadhana =

- Directed by: Madhu
- Written by: Sulochana Rani; George Onakkoor (dialogues)
- Screenplay by: George Onakkoor
- Starring: Madhu; Sharada; Vidhubala; Sukumari
- Cinematography: T. N. Krishnankutty Nair
- Edited by: G. Venkittaraman
- Music by: K. J. Joy; Lyrics; Bichu Thirumala
- Production company: Sarada Sathya Combines
- Distributed by: Sarada Sathya Combines
- Release date: 15 September 1977
- Country: India
- Language: Malayalam

Aaraadhana is a 1977 Indian Malayalam film, directed by Madhu. The film stars Madhu, Sharada, Vidhubala and Sukumari in the lead roles. The film has musical score by K. J. Joy.

== Cast ==
- Madhu as Anand
- Sharada as Sharadha
- Vidhubala as Radha
- Sukumari
- Jose Prakash
- Prem Prakash
- Prema
- Sankaradi
- Baby Sumathi
- Baby Vandana
- Neyyaattinkara Komalam
- Reena

== Soundtrack ==
The music was composed by K. J. Joy and the lyrics were written by Bichu Thirumala.

| No. | Song | Singers | Length (m:ss) |
|---|---|---|---|
| 1 | "Aaraaro Aariraaro" | K. J. Yesudas, S. Janaki | |
| 2 | "Kalippaattam" | P. Jayachandran | |
| 3 | "Pon Thaamarakal" | K. J. Yesudas, S. Janaki | |
| 4 | "Thaalam Thaalathil" | K. J. Yesudas, S. Janaki | |
