= Erattai Manithan =

- Title card
- Directed by: K. Shankar
- Written by: S. S. Rajendran
- Produced by: S. Aadhilakshmi
- Starring: S. S. Rajendran; Jai Ganesh; Latha; Sumithra; Bhavani
- Cinematography: D. V. Rajaram
- Edited by: K. Shankar; K. R. Krishnan
- Music by: M. S. Viswanathan
- Production company: Maruthupandiyan Pictures
- Release date: 14 January 1982
- Running time: 124 minutes
- Country: India
- Language: Tamil

Erattai Manithan (transl. Double Person) is a 1982 Indian Tamil-language film, directed by K. Shankar. The film stars S. S. Rajendran (who is also credited for film's script), Jai Ganesh, Latha, Sumithra and Bhavani. It was released on 14 January 1982, after over two years of delay.

== Plot ==
Durai is honest, straightforward and lives by a strict moral code. His only family is his younger sister Vani and he works as a manager for Thangavelu's company. Thangavelu's wife Mangalam and daughter Kannamma constantly clash with Durai's stodgy attitude but Thangavelu appreciates him. Thangavelu's family watches a play and see Durai as an actor in it. Mangalam and Kannamma point out Durai's hypocrisy and duplicity in pursuing acting when he has such strict expectations of everyone else. When Thangavelu confronts him, Durai lies and invents a younger twin brother, Raja, that is an actor and singer. Thangavelu and his family fall for his act and hire Raja to be Kannamma's music teacher. In the meantime, Vani falls in love with Chandran, Durai's co-star in his plays and also Thangavelu's nephew. Unknown to Vani, he's a cad that uses the ruse of producing films to get closer to various women. Kannamma falls in love with Raja who also loves her but is reticent due to his lies and her continuing dislike of Durai. Matters are further complicated when another of Durai's co-stars, Bhavani, learns the truth and blackmails him. Durai confesses all to Thangavelu's family and is forgiven but now has to face the ire of Chandran and Bhavani.

== Cast ==
- S. S. Rajendran as Durai
- Jai Ganesh as Chandran
- Latha as Kannamma
- Sumithra as Vani
- Bhavani as Bhavani
- V. K. Ramasamy as Thangavelu
- Manorama as Mangalam
- Suruli Rajan as Sokkan
- Gandhimathi as Ding Dong Ramamani
- Vellai Subbaiah
- D. V. Narayanaswamy
- Preetha
- A. K. Sundar
- P. P. Subbiah
- Karikol Raj
- K. R. Seetharaman
- Rajavelu
- Jayadev

== Soundtrack ==
The soundtrack was composed by M. S. Viswanathan.

Song	Singers	Lyrics
"Indraikku Naan Piranthen"	T. M. Soundararajan	S. S. Rajendran
"Neer Thoda Marantha"	T. M. Soundararajan, Vani Jairam	Pulamaipithan
"Naan Paada Paada"	L. R. Eswari	Muthulingam
"Putham Puthithu Vayathu"	L. R. Eswari	Kannadasan

== Critical reception ==
Sindhu-Jeeva of Kalki compared the film's plot to the Hindi film Gol Maal and added there were lot of political references in every frame and concluded looking at songs, background music, dialogues, comedy, etc. would have been appreciated if this film had come out twenty years ago.
