= Choola =

- Directed by: J. Sasikumar
- Written by: J. Sasikumar; T. V. Gopalakrishnan (dialogues)
- Screenplay by: J. Sasikumar
- Starring: M. G. Soman; Manavalan Joseph; Bhavani; P. J. Antony; Sankaradi
- Cinematography: M. C. Sekhar
- Edited by: V. P. Krishnan
- Music by: Raveendran
- Production company: Navarathna Movie Makers
- Distributed by: Jubilee Productions
- Release date: 21 September 1979
- Country: India
- Language: Malayalam

Choola is a 1979 Indian Malayalam film, directed by J. Sasikumar. The film stars M. G. Soman, Manavalan Joseph, Bhavani, P. J. Antony and Sankaradi in the lead roles. The film has musical score by Raveendran, who debuted through this film, and later became an influential music director in Malayalam film industry.

== Cast ==
- M. G. Soman
- Bhavani
- Manavalan Joseph
- Maya
- P. J. Antony
- Sankaradi
- Sreelatha Namboothiri
- Cochin Haneefa
- Chachappan
- Adoor Bhavani
- Baby Sumathi
- Cherthala Thankam
- G. K. Pillai
- Kollam Venukumar
- Kundara Venu
- Master Raghu
- Master Venu
- Master Manohar
- Meena
- Padmanabhapilla
- Stanley
- Thodupuzha Radhakrishnan

== Soundtrack ==
The music was composed by Raveendran.

No.	Song	Singers	Lyrics	Length (m:ss)
1	"Kirathadaaham"	K. J. Yesudas	Poovachal Khader	
2	"Sindoorasandhyaykku Mounam"	K. J. Yesudas, S. Janaki	Poovachal Khader	
3	"Thaarake Mizhiyithalil"	K. J. Yesudas	Sathyan Anthikkad	
4	"Uppinu Pokana Vazhiyethu"	Jency, Lathika	Sathyan Anthikkad	
