= Ashtamangalyam =

- LP Vinyl Records Cover
- Directed by: P. Gopikumar
- Written by: P. K. Abraham (dialogues)
- Screenplay by: P. K. Abraham
- Story by: J. K. V.
- Produced by: K. H. Khan Sahib
- Starring: Kamal Haasan; Vidhubala; Kanakadurga; Mallika Sukumaran; P. K. Abraham; Padmapriya
- Edited by: K. Sankunni
- Music by: M. K. Arjunan
- Production company: Kanthi Harsha
- Distributed by: Kanthi Harsha
- Release date: 22 July 1977
- Country: India
- Language: Malayalam

Ashtamangalyam is a 1977 Indian Malayalam-language film directed by P. Gopikumar and produced by K. H. Khan Sahib. The film stars Kamal Haasan, Vidhubala, Kanakadurga, Mallika Sukumaran, P. K. Abraham and Padmapriya. The film has a musical score by M. K. Arjunan.

== Cast ==
- Kamal Haasan
- Vidhubala
- Kanakadurga
- Mallika Sukumaran
- P. K. Abraham
- Padmapriya

== Soundtrack ==
The music was composed by M. K. Arjunan and the lyrics were written by Kanam E. J.

No.	Song	Singers	Lyrics	Length (m:ss)
1	"Chithrashalabham Chodichu"	K. J. Yesudas	Kanam E. J.	
2	"Indukamalam Choodi"	K. P. Brahmanandan	Kanam E. J.	
3	"Munthiri Neerinu"	S. Janaki	Kanam E. J.	
4	"Muthumanikal"	P. Susheela	Kanam E. J.	
5	"Sahyagiriyude"	P. Jayachandran, Vani Jairam	Kanam E. J.	
6	"Ushassil Neeyoru"	K. J. Yesudas	Kanam E. J.	

== Release ==
Ashtamangalyam was released on 22 July 1977, and the final length of the film was 3,707.79 metres (12,164.7 ft).
