= Sthree Oru Dukham =

- Directed by: A. G. Baby
- Written by: Manimala; Yatheendra Das (dialogues)
- Screenplay by: Vel A. P.
- Starring: Kaviyoor Ponnamma; K. P. Ummer; Kuthiravattam Pappu; Muralimohan
- Cinematography: Martin Aloysius
- Edited by: K. Narayanan
- Music by: Joshi
- Production company: Anjali Cine Creations
- Distributed by: Anjali Cine Creations
- Release date: 8 December 1978
- Country: India
- Language: Malayalam

Sthree Oru Dukham is a 1978 Indian Malayalam film, directed by A. G. Baby. The film stars Kaviyoor Ponnamma, K. P. Ummer, Kuthiravattam Pappu and Muralimohan in the lead roles. The film has musical score by Joshi.

== Cast ==
- Kaviyoor Ponnamma
- K. P. Ummer
- Kuthiravattam Pappu
- Muralimohan
- T. P. Madhavan
- Vidhubala
- Bhavani

== Soundtrack ==
The music was composed by Joshi and the lyrics were written by K. Narayanapilla.

No.	Song	Singers	Lyrics	Length (m:ss)
1	"Chirikkunna Puzhakkoru"	Vani Jairam	K. Narayanapilla	
