= Neelakannukal =

Indian film by Madhu

- Directed by: Madhu
- Written by: O. N. V. Kurup; S. L. Puram Sadanandan (dialogues)
- Screenplay by: S. L. Puram Sadanandan
- Starring: Madhu; Jayabharathi; KPAC Lalitha; Adoor Bhasi
- Cinematography: U. Rajagopal
- Edited by: G. Venkittaraman
- Music by: G. Devarajan
- Production company: KPAC Films
- Distributed by: KPAC Films
- Release date: 1 May 1974
- Country: India
- Language: Malayalam

Neelakannukal is a 1974 Indian Malayalam film directed by Madhu. The film stars Madhu, Jayabharathi, KPAC Lalitha and Adoor Bhasi in the lead roles. The film has musical score by G. Devarajan.

== Cast ==
- Madhu as Kunjiraman
- Jayabharathi as Malu
- KPAC Lalitha as Mariyamma
- Adoor Bhasi as Udakku Velu
- Manavalan Joseph as Porinju
- Sankaradi as Mathew Sakhavu
- Sukumaran as Sreedharan
- Aryad Gopalakrishnan as Kochappi
- Bahadoor as Mammu
- Jameela Malik as Jaanu
- KPAC Sunny as Cheriyan muthalali
- Paravoor Bharathan as Vijayan
- Thoppil Krishna Pillai as Antony
- Azeez as Police officer
- Kaviyoor Ponnamma as Chellamma
- Kedamangalam Ali as Kumaran
- TP Radhamani as Komalam

== Soundtrack ==
The music was composed by G. Devarajan and the lyrics were written by O. N. V. Kurup and Vayalar Ramavarma.

No.	Song	Singers	Lyrics	Length (m:ss)
1	"Allimalarkkilimakale"	P. Madhuri	O. N. V. Kurup	
2	"Kallolinee Vana Kallolinee"	P. Jayachandran	O. N. V. Kurup	
3	"Kavitha Kondu Nin Kanneeroppuvaan"	Chandrabhanu	O. N. V. Kurup	
4	"Kuttaalam Kuliraruvi"	K. J. Yesudas	Vayalar Ramavarma	
5	"Marikkaan Njangalkku Manassila"	K. J. Yesudas, P. Madhuri, Chorus	Vayalar Ramavarma	
6	"Mayooranarthanamaadi"	K. J. Yesudas	Vayalar Ramavarma	
7	"Viplavam Jayikkatte"	K. J. Yesudas, P. Madhuri	Vayalar Ramavarma	
