= Udayam Padinjaru =

- Directed by: Madhu
- Produced by: Madhu
- Starring: Madhu; Srividya; Prem Nazir; Shobana
- Cinematography: Jayanan Vincent; Anandakuttan
- Edited by: M. V. Natarajan
- Music by: A. T. Ummer; Jerry Amaldev
- Production company: Sapthasagara Movies
- Distributed by: Sapthasagara Movies
- Release date: 3 September 1986
- Country: India
- Language: Malayalam

Udayam Padinjaru is a 1986 Indian Malayalam film, directed and produced by Madhu. The film stars Madhu, Srividya, Prem Nazir and Shobana in the lead roles. The film has musical score by A. T. Ummer and Jerry Amaldev.

== Cast ==
- Madhu
- Srividya
- Prem Nazir
- Shobana
- Ratheesh
- Bharath Gopi
- Praveena
- Premanand Ramachandran (Padmini's Son)

== Soundtrack ==
The music was composed by A. T. Ummer and Jerry Amaldev and the lyrics were written by Puthusseri Ramachandran and Kavalam Narayana Panicker.

No.	Song	Singers	Lyrics	Length (m:ss)
1	"Atham Chithira"	K. S. Chithra, Chorus	Puthusseri Ramachandran	
2	"Kannadachirulil"	K. J. Yesudas, K. S. Chithra	Kavalam Narayana Panicker	
3	"Nilleda"	K. S. Chithra	Kavalam Narayana Panicker	
4	"Okkumarakkombathe"	K. J. Yesudas, K. S. Chithra	Kavalam Narayana Panicker	
