= Sindooracheppu =

- Directed by: Madhu
- Written by: Yusufali Kechery
- Produced by: Yusufali Kecheri
- Starring: Madhu; Jayabharathi; Prema; Sankaradi
- Cinematography: U. Rajagopal
- Edited by: G. Venkittaraman
- Music by: G. Devarajan
- Production company: Anjana Films
- Release date: 26 November 1971
- Country: India
- Language: Malayalam

Sindooracheppu is a 1971 Indian Malayalam-language film, directed by Madhu and produced and written by Yusufali Kechery. The film stars Madhu, Jayabharathi, Prema and Sankaradi. It won the Kerala State Film Award for Second Best Film.

== Cast ==
- Madhu as Keshavan
- Jayabharathi as Ammalu
- Prema as Devu
- Sankaradi as Sankaran Nair
- Shobha as young Ammalu
- T. S. Muthaiah as Appunni Kaimal
- Paravoor Bharathan as Kittu Kurup
- Philomina as Pithachu
- Premji as Thirumeni
- Bahadoor as Mammad
- Radhamani as Neeli
- Thodupuzha Radhakrishnan
- B.K Pottakadu
- Sudevan
- B. Krishna
- J.A.R Anand
- Baby Vijaya
- Master Vijaya Kumar

== Soundtrack ==
All lyrics are written by Yusufali Kechery; all music is composed by G. Devarajan.

No.	Title	Artist(s)	Length
1.	"Mandachaare Mottathalaya"	P. Madhuri, P. Susheela
2.	"Omalaale Kandu Njan"	K. J. Yesudas
3.	"Ponnil Kulicha Raathri"	K. J. Yesudas
4.	"Thambraan Thoduthathu"	P. Madhuri
5.	"Thanneeril Viriyum"	K. J. Yesudas
