= Mini (1995 film) =

- Directed by: P. Chandrakumar
- Written by: Iskantar Mirsa
- Produced by: Madhu
- Starring: Aarati Ghanashyam; Chandrahasan; Cuckoo Parameswaran; Babu G. Nair; Malini Nair; Ramachandran Nair
- Cinematography: Sukumar
- Edited by: Madhu Kainakari
- Music by: Vishnu Bhatt
- Release date: 1995
- Running time: 76 minutes
- Country: India
- Language: Malayalam

Mini is a 1995 Indian Malayalam-language children's film directed by P. Chandrakumar, written by Iskantar Mirsa, and produced by Madhu. The film depicts the problem of alcoholism through the determined efforts of a young girl to save her father from self-destruction. It stars Aarati Ghanashyam, Chandrahasan, Cuckoo Parameswaran, Babu G. Nair and Malini Nair in pivotal roles. It won the National Film Award for Best Film on Family Welfare. Aarati Ghanashyam won the Kerala State Film Award for Best Child Artist and Kerala Film Critics Association Award for Best Child Artist.

== Cast ==
- Aarati Ghanashyam as Mini
- Chandrahasan as Mini's father
- Kukku Parameswaran as Mini's mother
- Babu G. Nair
- Malini Nair
- N Ramachandran Nair
