= Rathilayam =

- Title Banner
- Directed by: P. Chandrakumar
- Written by: Ravi Vilangan
- Produced by: Madhu
- Starring: Madhu; Silk Smitha; Captain Raju
- Cinematography: Jayanan Vincent
- Edited by: K. Narayanan
- Music by: A. T. Ummer; M. G. Radhakrishnan
- Production company: Uma Arts
- Distributed by: Uma Arts
- Release date: 6 May 1983
- Country: India
- Language: Malayalam

Rathilayam is a 1983 Indian Malayalam film, directed by P. Chandrakumar and produced by Madhu. The film stars Madhu, Silk Smitha and Captain Raju in the lead roles. The film has musical score by A. T. Ummer and M. G. Radhakrishnan.

== Cast ==
- Madhu as Mammad Kutti
- Srividya as Nabeesa
- Captain Raju as Appukuttan
- Silk Smitha as Devikutty
- M. G. Soman as Somen Thiruvalla
- Sankaradi as Const. Vasu Pilla
- Menaka as Makkotty
- Rajkumar as Rajan
- G. K. Pillai as Menon
- Shanavas as Shanker
- Soorya as Sarasamma
- Mala Aravindan as Const. Lonappan
- Jagathy Sreekumar
- Bheeman Raghu

== Soundtrack ==
The music was composed by A. T. Ummer and M. G. Radhakrishnan and the lyrics were written by Poovachal Khader.

No.	Song	Singers	Lyrics	Length (m:ss)
1	"Kadalilum Karayilum"	K. S. Chithra, K. G. Markose	Poovachal Khader	
2	"Mohini Priyaroopini"	P. Jayachandran	Poovachal Khader	
3	"Mylaanchiyaniyunna"	Srividya, Chorus	Poovachal Khader	
4	"Unmaadam Ullaasam"	K. G. Markose, Srikanth	Poovachal Khader	
