= Kaamam Krodham Moham =

- Directed by: Madhu
- Written by: P. R. Chandran
- Screenplay by: P. R. Chandran
- Produced by: Madhu
- Starring: Madhu; Jayabharathi; Nanditha Bose; Kallayam Krishnadas; Manavalan Joseph
- Cinematography: Benjamin
- Edited by: G. Venkittaraman
- Music by: Shyam; Lyrics: Bichu Thirumala; Bharanikkavu Sivakumar
- Production company: Prasanthi
- Distributed by: Thirumeni Pictures
- Release date: 26 September 1975
- Country: India
- Language: Malayalam

Kaamam Krodham Moham (transl. Lust, fury, desire) is a 1975 Indian Malayalam-language film directed and produced by Madhu and written by P. R. Chandran. It stars Madhu, Jayabharathi, Nanditha Bose, Kallayam Krishnadas and Manavalan Joseph and features a musical score by Shyam.

== Cast ==
- Madhu
- Jayabharathi
- Nanditha Bose
- Kallayam Krishnadas
- Manavalan Joseph
- Muthukulam Raghavan Pillai
- Pattom Sadan
- Sankaradi
- Shobha
- Baby Jayarani
- Kottarakkara Sreedharan Nair
- Kuttan
- Nanditha Bose
- P. K. Abraham
- Pushpa
- K. V. Shanthi
- Sudevan
- T. P. Madhavan

== Soundtrack ==
The music was composed by Shyam and the lyrics were written by Bharanikkavu Sivakumar and Bichu Thirumala.

| No. | Song | Singers | Lyrics | Length (m:ss) |
|---|---|---|---|---|
| 1 | "Aluva Meyyale" | Ambili, Pattom Sadan | Bichu Thirumala, Bharanikkavu Sivakumar | |
| 2 | "Raagaardra Hamsangalo" | K. J. Yesudas, P. Susheela | Bharanikkavu Sivakumar | |
| 3 | "Raajaadhiraajante" | Bichu Thirumala, Sujatha Mohan, Ambili | Bichu Thirumala | |
| 4 | "Swapnam Kaanum Penne" | K. J. Yesudas, Sujatha Mohan | Bharanikkavu Sivakumar | |
| 5 | "Unmaadam Gandharva" | K. J. Yesudas, Ambili | Bichu Thirumala | |
