= Kalpavriksham =

- Directed by: Hariharan
- Written by: Chirayinkeezhu Ramakrishnan Nair; Sreekumaran Thampi (dialogues)
- Screenplay by: Sreekumaran Thampi
- Produced by: T. K. K. Nambiar
- Starring: Prem Nazir; Jayan; Sukumaran; M G Soman; Jayabharathi; Bhavani
- Cinematography: C. Ramachandra Menon
- Edited by: K. Sankunni
- Music by: V. Dakshinamoorthy
- Production company: Devi Jayasree Productions
- Distributed by: Devi Jayasree Productions
- Release date: 3 February 1978
- Country: India
- Language: Malayalam

Kalpavriksham is a 1978 Indian Malayalam-language film, directed by Hariharan and produced by T. K. K. Nambiar. The film stars Prem Nazir, Jayan, Jayabharathi, Bhavani, and M. G. Soman .

Radha is in search for the person Gopi who cheated her twin sister Radhika, and Vasu who handled all their properties by trick. So she pretended and renamed her as a business tycoon Mayadevi in the cheaters hotel. There she meets Rajendhran, who accompanies her for revenge and to take back the properties. But there is a big twist when Rajendhran realises that his brother Surendhran is also a part of Gopi and Vasu's Gang.

== Cast ==
- Prem Nazir as Rajendran
- Jayan as Gopi
- Jayabharathi as Radhika, Radha(double role) Mayadevi
- Jagathy Sreekumar as Saimon
- Sukumaran as Ajayan/Vasu
- M. G. Soman as Surendran
- Unnimary as Rama
- Adoor Bhasi as Judo/Ajayan
- Bhavani as Sreedevi
- Thikkurissy Sukumaran Nair as Sankaran Menon
- Sreelatha Namboothiri as Phalgunani
- T. R. Omana as Devakiyamma
- K. P. Ummer as Menon Radha's and Radhikas father
- Bahadoor as Shankara Pilla
- Meena as Nani

== Soundtrack ==
The music was composed by V. Dakshinamoorthy and the lyrics were written by Sreekumaran Thampi and Chirayinkeezhu Ramakrishnan Nair.

No.	Song	Singers	Lyrics	Length (m:ss)
1	"Chandhralekha kinnari"	K. J Yesudas	Sreekumaran Thampi	
2	"Madhyamo Maayayo"	S.Janaki	Chirayinkeezhu Ramakrishnan Nair	
3	"Vaidoorya Rathnamaala"	S.Janaki	Chirayinkeezhu Ramakrishnan Nair	
4	"Mazhathulli Thulli"	K.J Yesudas	Chirayinkeezhu Ramakrishnan Nair	
5 6. 7.	"Vayal Varambil" "Alakapuri" "Muthiyamma pole"	K. J. Yesudas K. J Yesudas, P.Madhuri, chorus P.madhuri, P.Jayachandhran	Sreekumaran Thampi	
