= Dheerasameere Yamuna Theere =

- Directed by: Madhu
- Written by: Cheri Viswanath
- Produced by: M. Mani
- Starring: Madhu; Kaviyoor Ponnamma; Thikkurissy Sukumaran Nair; Unnimary
- Cinematography: U. Rajagopal
- Edited by: G. Venkittaraman
- Music by: Shyam
- Production company: Sunitha Productions
- Distributed by: Sunitha Productions
- Release date: 21 January 1977
- Country: India
- Language: Malayalam

Dheerasameere Yamuna Theere is a 1977 Indian Malayalam-language film directed by Madhu and produced by M. Mani. The film stars Madhu, Kaviyoor Ponnamma, Thikkurissy Sukumaran Nair and Unnimary. The film features a musical score by Shyam. It was the first film produced at Uma Studio, which was founded by Madhu.

== Cast ==
- Madhu
- Kaviyoor Ponnamma
- Thikkurissy Sukumaran Nair
- Unnimary
- T. P. Madhavan
- Vidhubala

== Soundtrack ==
The music was composed by Shyam and the lyrics were written by O. N. V. Kurup.

No.	Song	Singers	Lyrics	Length
1	"Aanandam Brahmaanandam"	P. Jayachandran, L. R. Eeswari, Chorus, Pattom Sadan	O. N. V. Kurup	
2	"Ambili Ponnambili"	P. Jayachandran	O. N. V. Kurup	
3	"Dheerasameere Yamunaatheere"	K. J. Yesudas, S. Janaki	O. N. V. Kurup	
4	"Manassinte Thaalukalkkidayil"	S. Janaki	O. N. V. Kurup	
5	"Njaattuvelakkili"	P. Susheela	O. N. V. Kurup	
6	"Puthilanji Chillakalil"	P. Susheela	O. N. V. Kurup	
