= Theekkanal =

- Directed by: Madhu
- Written by: Thoppil Bhasi
- Screenplay by: Thoppil Bhasi
- Produced by: George Thomas
- Starring: Madhu; Srividya; Mohan Sharma; Pattom Sadan
- Cinematography: U. Rajagopal
- Edited by: G. Venkittaraman
- Music by: K. J. Yesudas
- Production company: JN Productions
- Distributed by: JN Productions
- Release date: 14 April 1976
- Country: India
- Language: Malayalam

Theekkanal is a 1976 Indian Malayalam film, directed by Madhu and produced by George Thomas. The film stars Madhu, Srividya, Mohan Sharma and Pattom Sadan. The film's musical score is by K. J. Yesudas. The film was remade in Tamil as Dheepam (1977) with Sivaji Ganesan, in Telugu as Amara Deepam (1977) with Krishnam Raju, in Hindi as Amar Deep (1979) with Rajesh Khanna and in Kannada as Amara Jyothi (1985) with Ambareesh.

== Cast ==
- Madhu
- Srividya
- Mohan Sharma
- Pattom Sadan
- Sankaradi
- Kanakadurga
- Vidhubala

== Soundtrack ==
The music was composed by K. J. Yesudas with lyrics written by Vayalar.

No.	Song	Singers	Lyrics	Length (m:ss)
1	"Ascharyachoodamani"	K. J. Yesudas	Vayalar	
2	"Chandramouli"	K. J. Yesudas	Vayalar	
3	"Kaattinu Kulirukori"	K. J. Yesudas, P. Susheela	Vayalar	
4	"Maanathe Kanalukettu"	K. J. Yesudas	Vayalar	
5	"Pomukiloru Puzhayaakaan"	P. Susheela	Vayalar	

== Box office ==
The film was commercial success.
