= Prabhaathasandhya =

- Theatrical release poster
- Directed by: P. Chandrakumar
- Written by: Chowalloor Krishnankutty
- Screenplay by: Chowalloor Krishnankutty
- Produced by: Madhu
- Starring: Madhu; Srividya; Thikkurissy Sukumaran Nair; Jose
- Cinematography: V. Karunakaran
- Edited by: G. Venkittaraman
- Music by: Shyam
- Production company: Uma Arts
- Distributed by: Uma Arts
- Release date: 30 November 1979
- Country: India
- Language: Malayalam

Prabhaathasandhya is a 1979 Indian Malayalam-language film, directed by P. Chandrakumar. Madhu produced the film and also stars in it along with Srividya, Thikkurissy Sukumaran Nair and Jose. The film's score was composed by Shyam. Karthika made her on-screen debut as a child artist.

== Cast ==
- Madhu
- Srividya
- Thikkurissy Sukumaran Nair
- Jose
- Sankaradi
- Ambika
- Aranmula Ponnamma
- Kaviyoor Ponnamma
- Janardanan
- M. G. Soman
- Seema
- Karthika

== Soundtrack ==
The music was composed by Shyam with lyrics by Sreekumaran Thampi.

No.	Song	Singers	Lyrics	Length (m:ss)
1	"Aramani Kingini"	P. Jayachandran, Vani Jairam	Sreekumaran Thampi	
2	"Chandanalathakalilonnu"	K. J. Yesudas, S. Janaki	Sreekumaran Thampi	
3	"Kalaakairali"	Vani Jairam	Sreekumaran Thampi	
4	"Oro Poovum Vidarumpol"	K. J. Yesudas	Sreekumaran Thampi	
5	"Vasantha Varna Melayil"	P. Jayachandran	Sreekumaran Thampi	
