= Oru Yugasandhya =

- Directed by: Madhu
- Written by: G. Vivekanandan; Pappanamkodu Lakshmanan (dialogues)
- Screenplay by: Pappanamkodu Lakshmanan
- Produced by: P. K. R. Pillai
- Starring: Madhu; Shankar; Innocent; Srividya
- Edited by: G. Venkittaraman
- Music by: A. T. Ummer
- Production company: Shirdi Sai Creations
- Distributed by: Shirdi Sai Creations
- Release date: 24 February 1986
- Country: India
- Language: Malayalam

Oru Yugasandhya is a 1986 Indian Malayalam-language film, directed by Madhu and produced by P. K. R. Pillai. The film stars Madhu, Shankar Panicker, Innocent and Srividya. The film has musical score by A. T. Ummer.

== Plot ==
Kottappuram Kuruppu is an ill-tempered head of the aristocratic Nair family. His family consists of his wife Kathamma, 3 daughters and a son. Two of his daughters are married and his sons-in-law are Sreedharan Nair and Gopalan Nair . His son Babu, a mechanic is in love with their caretaker Kuttayi's daughter Ammu. The younger daughter, Sumathi, a school teacher, is in love with her colleague Balachandran.

The family is in financial ruins and Kuruppu owes money to the local money lender, Chettiyar. The rest of the story is about the family's internal struggles when both Sumathi and Babu take different approaches to marry their lovers.

== Cast ==
- Madhu as Kottappuram Kuruppu
- Srividya as Karthyayani Amma a.k.a. Kathamma Thambratti
- Shankar as Babu
- Soorya as Ammu
- Devan as Balachandran
- Nalini as Sumathi
- Innocent as Sreedharan Nair
- Kuyili (actress) as Dakshayani
- Nedumudi Venu as Gopalan
- Sreerekha as Rajamma
- Thilakan as Shanmukham Chettiyar
- Bahadoor as Pappu Pillai
- Vettoor Purushan as Pushkaran
- Sreenath as Karunan
- Sankaradi as Kuttayi
- Mala Aravindan
- Paravoor Bharathan

== Soundtrack ==
All lyrics are written by P. Bhaskaran; all music is composed by A. T. Ummer.

No.	Title	Artist(s)	Length
1.	"Ee Aashaante"	Choir, C. O. Anto
2.	"Ivide Ee Vazhiyil"	K. J. Yesudas
3.	"Vampanukkum"	K. J. Yesudas, Choir
4.	"Velipparuthi Poove"	K. S. Chithra
