= Vaiki Vanna Vasantham =

- Directed by: Balachandra Menon
- Written by: Balachandra Menon
- Screenplay by: Balachandra Menon
- Starring: Madhu; Srividya; Ambika; Raghuraj
- Cinematography: Vipin Das
- Edited by: G. Venkittaraman
- Music by: Shyam
- Production company: Uma Arts
- Distributed by: Uma Arts
- Release date: 28 November 1980
- Country: India
- Language: Malayalam

Vaiki Vanna Vasantham is a 1980 Indian Malayalam film, directed by Balachandra Menon. The film stars Madhu, Srividya, Ambika and Raghuraj in the lead roles. The film has musical score by Shyam.

== Cast ==
- Madhu
- Srividya
- Ambika
- Raghuraj
- Sukumari
- Sankaradi
- Rajan Sankaradi
- Dhanya
- Kailas Nath
- Oduvil Unnikrishnan
- T. P. Madhavan

== Soundtrack ==
The music was composed by Shyam.

No.	Song	Singers	Lyrics	Length (m:ss)
1	"Ee Vada Kando Sakhakkale"	P. Jayachandran	Sreekumaran Thampi	
2	"Kaalindi Vilichaal Vilikelkum Kanna"	Vani Jairam	Sreekumaran Thampi	
3	"Ore Paathayil"	P. Susheela, P. Jayachandran	Sreekumaran Thampi	
4	"Oru Poovirinju"	Vani Jairam	Sreekumaran Thampi	
5	"Vaasanayude Theril"	K. J. Yesudas, Vani Jairam, Chorus	Sreekumaran Thampi	
