= Archana Teacher =

- Directed by: P. N. Menon
- Written by: P. N. Menon
- Screenplay by: P. N. Menon
- Produced by: Madhu
- Starring: Madhu; Seema; Venu Nagavally; Ambika
- Cinematography: Vipin Mohan
- Music by: Shyam
- Production company: Uma Arts
- Distributed by: Chalachitra
- Release date: 16 October 1981
- Country: India
- Language: Malayalam

Archana Teacher is a 1981 Indian Malayalam film, directed by P. N. Menon and produced by Madhu. A remake of Bengali film Saat Pake Bandha (1963), the film stars Madhu, Seema, Venu Nagavally and Ambika in the lead roles. The film featured a musical score by Shyam.

== Cast ==
- Madhu
- Seema
- Venu Nagavally
- Ambika
- Sukumari
- K. P. A. C. Sunny
- Sankaradi
- Aranmula Ponnamma
- P. K. Abraham
- T. P. Madhavan

== Soundtrack ==
The music was composed by Shyam and the lyrics were written by Sreekumaran Thampi.

| No. | Song | Singers | Lyrics | Length (m:ss) |
|---|---|---|---|---|
| 1 | "Ente Jeevitham" | K. J. Yesudas | Sreekumaran Thampi | |
| 2 | "Oro Nimishavum" | S. Janaki, P. Jayachandran | Sreekumaran Thampi | |
| 3 | "Pookkula Choodiya Nirapara" | Vani Jairam | Sreekumaran Thampi | |
| 4 | "Pularikalkkenthu Bhangi" | P. Susheela | Sreekumaran Thampi | |
