= Kaithappoo =

- Directed by: Raghuraman
- Written by: George Onakkoor
- Screenplay by: George Onakkoor
- Starring: Madhu; KPAC Lalitha; Manavalan Joseph; Pattom Sadan
- Edited by: G. Venkittaraman
- Music by: Shyam; Lyrics: Bichu Thirumala
- Production companies: Uma & Sunitha Combines
- Distributed by: Uma & Sunitha Combines
- Release date: 20 January 1978
- Country: India
- Language: Malayalam

Kaithappoo is a 1978 Indian Malayalam film, directed by Raghuraman. The film stars Madhu, KPAC Lalitha, Manavalan Joseph, and Pattom Sadan. The musical score is by Shyam.

== Cast ==
- Madhu
- KPAC Lalitha
- Manavalan Joseph
- Pattom Sadan
- Raghavan
- Prathapachandran
- Adoor Bhavani
- Alummoodan
- Anandavally
- Aranmula Ponnamma
- Aryad Gopalakrishnan
- Baby Sreekala
- Baby Sumathi
- KPAC Sunny
- Khadeeja
- Kuthiravattam Pappu
- Master Natarajan
- Meena
- Rani Chandra
- S. P. Pillai
- Sudheer
- Veeran

== Soundtrack ==
The music was composed by Shyam and the lyrics were written by Bichu Thirumala.

No.	Song	Singers	Lyrics	Length (m:ss)
1	"Kaatte Vaa Kaatte Vaa"	S. Janaki, P. Susheela, Chorus	Bichu Thirumala	
2	"Kaatte Vaa Kaatte Vaa" (F)	P. Susheela	Bichu Thirumala	
3	"Malayalame"	P. Susheela	Bichu Thirumala	
4	"Pularikalum Poomanavum"	P. Susheela	Bichu Thirumala	
5	"Sarigama Padunna"	S. Janaki, P. Susheela	Bichu Thirumala	
6	"Shaanthathayengum"	K. J. Yesudas	Bichu Thirumala	
