= Priya (1970 film) =

- Poster
- Directed by: Madhu
- Story by: C. Radhakrishnan
- Produced by: N. P. Abu
- Starring: Madhu; Sukumari; Jayabharathi; Adoor Bhasi
- Cinematography: U. Rajagopal
- Edited by: Hrishikesh Mukherjee
- Music by: M. S. Baburaj
- Production company: Jammu Films
- Release date: 27 November 1970
- Country: India
- Language: Malayalam

Priya is a 1970 Indian Malayalam-language film, directed by Madhu and produced by N. P. Abu. The film stars Madhu, Sukumari, Jayabharathi and Adoor Bhasi. It is the first directorial venture of actor Madhu, also the Malayalam debut of Mahendra Kapoor and the only Malayalam film of actress Lilly Chakravarthy. The movie won two Kerala State Film Awards for Second Best Film and Best Editor. The film was based on novel Thevidissi by C. Radhakrishnan.

== Cast ==
- Madhu
- Sukumari
- Jayabharathi
- Adoor Bhasi
- Kottayam Santha
- Sankaradi
- Ramu Kariyat
- Abbas
- Bahadoor
- Chandraji
- Khadeeja
- Lily Chakravarty
- Meena
- Paravoor Bharathan
- Philomina
- Prema Rao
- T. K. Balachandran
- Veeran

== Soundtrack ==
The music was composed by M. S. Baburaj with lyrics by Yusufali Kechery.

No.	Song	Singers	Lyrics	Length (m:ss)
1	"Aadaanumariyaam"	S. Janaki	Yusufali Kechery	
2	"Kaneeraaloru"	S. Janaki	Yusufali Kechery	
3	"Kanninu Kannaaya Kanna"	Latha Raju	Yusufali Kechery	
4	"Kannonnu Thurakkoo"	S. Janaki, P. Leela	Yusufali Kechery	
5	"Saagaradevatha"	Mahendra Kapoor	Yusufali Kechery	
6	"Vinnile Kaavil"	S. Janaki	Yusufali Kechery	
