= Akkaldaama =

1975 film

- Directed by: Madhu
- Written by: P. R. Chandran
- Screenplay by: P. R. Chandran
- Produced by: Madhu
- Starring: Madhu; Srividya; K. P. A. C. Lalitha; Gangadharan
- Cinematography: Benjamin
- Edited by: G. Venkittaraman
- Music by: Shyam
- Production company: Kalyani Kalakshethram
- Distributed by: Thirumeni Pictures
- Release date: 28 March 1975
- Country: India
- Language: Malayalam

Akkaldaama (transl. Akeldama (field of blood)) is a 1975 Indian Malayalam-language film directed and produced by Madhu and written by P. R. Chandran. The film stars Madhu, Srividya, K. P. A. C. Lalitha, and Gangadharan. The film features music by Shyam.

== Plot ==
An army officer suffers a leg injury in the line of duty. While recovering in the hospital, he falls in love with and marries a beautiful nurse named Moly.

Following his medical retirement, the couple moves back to the former soldier's hometown to live on his private estate. Although they share deep, mutual affection, they are deeply troubled by their failure to conceive a child after more than six years of marriage.

The movie unfolds as a high-stakes family melodrama where the hidden pasts, mounting guilt, and private actions of the central characters converge to create a metaphorical "field of blood".

== Cast ==
- Madhu
- Srividya
- K. P. A. C. Lalitha
- Gangadharan
- Kallayam Krishnadas
- Manavalan Joseph
- Sankaradi
- Suresh
- Babu Jaya
- Chandraji
- Kochaniyan
- Kottarakkara Sreedharan Nair
- Kottayam Narayanan
- K. V. Shanthi
- Sreeni
- Sudevan
- Sundaresan
- Treesa
- Usharani

== Soundtrack ==
The music was composed by Shyam. Lyrics was by Bichu Thirumala, Bharanikkavu Sivakumar, and Ettumanoor Somadasan.

No.	Song	Singers	Lyrics	Length (m:ss)
1	"Adhwaanikkunnavare"	K. J. Yesudas	Ettumanoor Somadasan	
2	"Akkaldaamathan"	S. Janaki, K. P. Brahmanandan	Bharanikkavu Sivakumar	
3	"Neelakaashavum Meghangalum"	K. P. Brahmanandan	Bichu Thirumala	
4	"Oru Poonthanalum Munthiriyum"	K. J. Yesudas, P. Madhuri	Ettumanoor Somadasan	
5	"Parudeesa Poypoyore"	K. P. Brahmanandan, Chorus	Ettumanoor Somadasan	
