= Madhu (actor) =

Indian actor

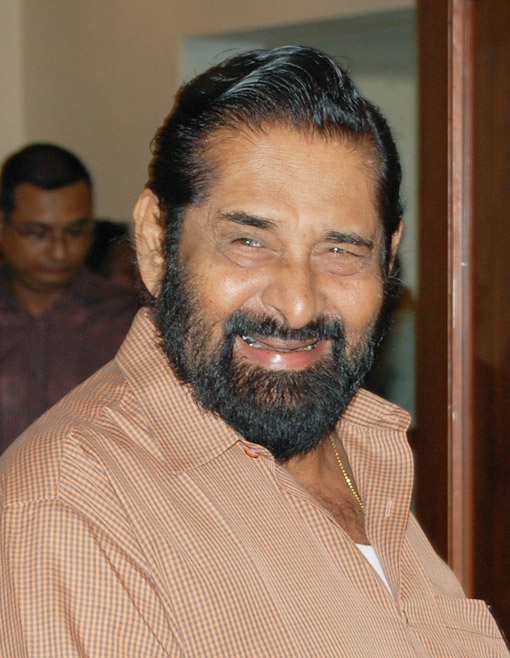
- Madhu in 2008
- Born: Madhavan Nair; 23 September 1933 (age 93); Gowreesapattom, Kingdom of Travancore, British India (present day Thiruvananthapuram, Kerala, India)
- Education: Mahatma Gandhi College, Thiruvananthapuram; University College Thiruvananthapuram; Banaras Hindu University, Varanasi; National School of Drama, New Delhi
- Occupations: Actor; director; producer
- Years active: 1963–present
- Works: Full list
- Spouse: Jayalakshmi (died 2014)
- Children: 1
- Parent(s): R. Parameswaran Pillai (father); Thankamma Pillai (mother)
- Awards: J. C. Daniel Award (2004); Padma Shri (2013)
- Website: www.madhutheactor.com

Madhavan Nair (born on 23 September 1933) better known by his stage name Madhu, is an Indian actor, director, producer, former college lecturer and former film studio owner, who works in Malayalam cinema and occasionally in Hindi and Tamil films. He was a prominent lead actor during the 1960s, 1970s and 1980s and has acted in more than 400 films. Madhu has also directed 12 films, produced 15 films and at one time owned the Uma Film Studio. He was awarded the Padma Shri by the Government of India in 2013 for his contributions towards the arts. He was honored with the J. C. Daniel Award by the Government of Kerala in 2004, for his outstanding contributions to Malayalam films. He is the president of Indian People's Theatre Association (IPTA) Kerala Unit.

Mini, a children's movie Madhu produced, bagged the Indira Gandhi National Award for Best Film on Family Welfare, at the 43rd National Film Awards in 1995. He is the inaugural winner of the Filmfare Award for Best Actor – Malayalam for his performance in Swayamvaram (1972), has received three more Filmfare awards and is also the recipient of five Kerala State Film Awards. Madhu starred Chemmeen won the President's Gold Medal for the All India Best Feature Film in 1965, becoming the first Malayalam film to win the title.

== Personal life ==
He was born on 23 September 1933 at Gowreesapattom in the erstwhile Travancore. His father, R. Parameswaran Pillai, hailing from Padmanabhapuram near Thuckalay in Kanyakumari District, was the erstwhile mayor of Thiruvananthapuram and his mother Thankamma Pillai was a housewife. He has four sisters. He had his primary schooling up to the fourth standard at Kunnukuzhi L.P. School, fifth class (preparatory) at S. M. V. School, 1st form to 3rd form at Pettah Middle School and fourth form to sixth form (SSLC) at St. Joseph's High School. He did a pre-university degree at Mahatma Gandhi College and graduated in Hindi from University College. He did his postgraduation in Hindi from Banaras Hindu University (BHU).

He was married to Jayalakshmi till her death in 2014. They have a daughter, Dr. Uma J. Nair.

== Career ==
He started his career as a Hindi lecturer in S. T. Hindu College and then Scott Christian College in Nagercoil, Kanyakumari District. During that time he chanced upon a newspaper advertisement inviting applications for the National School of Drama course. While studying at NSD, he became acquainted with Ramu Kariat, who offered him a role in his forthcoming film Moodupadam (1963). After completing the course, Madhu went to Chennai to screen test for Karyat's film. While there, in 1963, he was offered a role in N. N. Pisharody's film, Ninamaninja Kalpadukal and this became his debut. In the movie, he portrayed Stephen, an Indian army soldier who sacrifices his life on the battlefield for his motherland. The role and the movie were well received by the public. Moodupadam, for which he had come to Chennai for the make up test, became his second film. From thereon, there was no looking back.

He has expressed all facets of life through his various acting roles. Perhaps his most notable role during his early career was in Kariat's Chemmeen, which won the President's Gold Medal. Madhu entered Malayalam cinema at a time when lead roles were dominated by actors like Prem Nazir and Sathyan and created a niche for himself. One of his early films where he made a mark was Bhargavi Nilayam, a suspense movie, where he is the only actor on screen during the first half of the movie. This was followed by Udhyogastha, Virunnukari, and Veettu Mrugam, by P. Venu. Madhu has brought to life on screen, memorable characters from the works of eminent writers in Malayalam; Vaikom Muhammad Basheer, Thakazhi, P. Kesavadev, Uroob, Ponkunnam Varkey, S. K. Pottekkatt, Changampuzha, M. T. Vasudevan Nair, G. Vivekanandan, N. N. Pisharody and C. Radhakrishnan, to name a few.

In an acting career spanning over five decades, Madhu acted in over 370 films. Although he was a big star in commercial films, he also acted in parallel movies. Such parallel movies include Adoor Gopalakrishnan's Swayamvaram, P. N. Menon's Olavum Theeravum, etc.

Madhu also proved his talents as a filmmaker and director. His first directorial venture Priya, released in 1970, was a trendsetter in Malayalam. The film won the Kerala Government award for the second-best film that year. Madhu directed twelve movies, including hit films like Sindooracheppu, Manya Shree Vishwamitran, Neela Kannukal, Akkaldama, Kamam Krodham Moham, Theekanal, Dheerasameere Yamunathere, Aaradhana, Oru Yuga Sandhya and Udayam Padinjaru. He was also the producer of several of these films. He produced fifteen movies including Kaithapoo, Asthamayam, Shudhi Kalasham, Prabhatha Sandhya, Vaiki Vanna Vasantham, Archana Teacher, Grihalakshmi, Njan Ekananu, Rathilayam and Mini. He also produced and directed a movie in English 'Sunrise in the West', which was shot entirely in the USA. He was instrumental in introducing a number of talented actors, directors, lyricists, producers, singers and other technicians to the Malayalam filmdom. He was the owner of the once-renowned Uma studio at Puliyarakonam in Thiruvananthapuram. Mini produced by Madhu won the National Film Award for Best Film on Family Welfare, at the 43rd National Film Awards in 1995. The film focuses on the social issue of alcoholism.

Madhu was one of the lead actors in the Hindi film Saat Hindustani, which was the debut movie of the Bollywood actor Amitabh Bachchan in 1969. His other Hindi films are 'Chakachak' directed by Sai Paranjpye and Maiyya directed by Anil.

Madhu has also done three Tamil films, as Rajinikanth's father in Dharma Dorai, Oru Ponnu Oru Paiyan and Bharatha Vilas.

== Filmography ==
Madhu has so far acted in more than 400 movies including Malayalam, Hindi and Tamil languages and directed 12 movies.

== Accolades ==
Civilian Awards

- 2013 Padma Shri

National Film Award

- 1995 National Film Award for Best Film on Family Welfare for Mini (Produced by Madhu) in 1995 (Directed by P. Chandrakumar)

Kerala State Film Award

- 2004 J. C. Daniel Award for Lifetime Achievement from the Government of Kerala.
- 1995 Kerala State Film Award for Best Children's Film for Mini (Produced by Madhu) in 1995 (Directed by P. Chandrakumar)
- 1992 Kerala State Film Award (Special Jury Award) in 1992 for Kudumbasametham
- 1980 Kerala State Film Award (Special Jury Award) in 1980 for multiple films
- 1971 Kerala State Film Award for Second Best Film for Sindooracheppu (Directed by Madhu) in 1971.
- 1970 Kerala State Film Award for Second Best Film for Priya (Directed by Madhu) in 1970.

Kerala Film Critics Association Awards

- 1994 Chalachitra Ratnam Award for Lifetime Achievement
- 1979 Kerala Film Critics Association Award for Best Actor for Idavazhiyile Poocha Minda Poocha
- 1977 Kerala Film Critics Association Award for Best Actor for Yuddha Kandam, Itha Ivide Vare

Filmfare Awards South

- 1994 Filmfare Lifetime Achievement Award – South (1994)
- 1977 Filmfare Award for Best Actor – Malayalam – Yuddha Kaandam (1977)
- 1976 Filmfare Award for Best Actor – Malayalam – Theekkanal (1976)
- 1972 Filmfare Award for Best Actor – Malayalam – Swayamvaram (1972) (inaugural winner)

Other awards

- 2013 Honored by the President of India during 100 years of Indian Cinema celebration held at Chennai
- 2013 Honour from the Government of Kerala for completing 5 decades in Malayalam film industry
- 2013 Honoured by AMMA (Association of Malayalam Movie Artists) for his contributions to the Malayalam film industry, spanning over 50 years
- 2013 Honour from MACTA on completion of 50 years in Malayalam Cinema
- Award from Thunchath Ezhuthachan Malayalam University, in recognition of his contributions to Malayalam cinema
- MACTA Legends Honour Award
- Sathyan Award 2012
- Prem Nazir Foundation Award
- Ramu Kariat Award
- Dr. Sukumar Azhikode Award
- Thoppil Bhasi Smaraka Prathibha Puraskaram
- P. Bhaskaran Foundation Award
- Thilakan Foundation Award
- Narendra Prasad Puraskaram
- Bahadoor Foundation Award in 2005
- Muthukulam Raghavan Pillai Memorial Award
- Asianet Film Awards 2002 – Best Lifetime Achievement Award
- Malayalam Puraskaram 1199 – Lifetime Achievement Award by Malayala Puraskara Samithi in 2024
