= K. P. A. C. Lalitha filmography =

Indian film and television actress

K. P. A. C. Lalitha was an Indian film and television actress, who predominantly appeared in Malayalam films and has few credits in Tamil. Lalitha, who hails from Kerala began her acting career at age 16 as a stage actor in the theatre group Kerala People's Arts Club (K. P. A. C.). She made her film debut in 1969 with the film Koottukudumbam, an adaptation of K. P. A. C.'s play of the same name. Since then, in a career spanning over five decades, she had acted in more than 550 feature films. She was two time National Film Awards winner for Best Supporting Actress and had won four Kerala State Film Awards for Second Best Actress. She chaired the Kerala Sangeetha Nataka Akademi.

== Films ==
=== Malayalam ===
==== 1960s ====
Year	Title	Role	Notes
1969	Koottukudumbam	Saraswathi	

==== 1970s ====
Year	Title	Role	Notes
1970	Ningalenne Communistakki	Meenakshi	
1970	Othenente Makan	Pulluvathi	
1970	Vazhve Mayam	Gowri	
1970	Thriveni	Janaki	
1971	Sarasayya	Galy	
1971	Lora Neeyevide	Meenu	
1971	Vilakku Vangiya Veena	Geetha	
1971	Anubhavangal Paalichakal	Parvathi	
1972	Postmane Kananilla	Kalyani	
1972	Oru Sundariyude Katha	Pankajakshi	
1972	Maravil Thirivu Sookshikkuka		
1972	Gandharavakshetram	Kunjukutty	
1972	Swayamvaram	Kalyani	
1973	Enippadikal		
1973	Ithu Manushyano		
1973	Masappady Mathupillai	Guariyamma	
1973	Madhavikutty	Kunjukutti	
1973	Kaliyugam	Bhargavu	
1973	Thenaruvi	Mariyamma	
1973	Ponnapuram Kotta	Kunjkutti	
1973	Divyadharsanam	Maheshwari	
1973	Maram	Jaanu	
1973	Thottavadi	Gouri	
1973	Mazhakaaru	Meenakshi	
1973	Azhakulla Saleena	Mary	
1973	Thekkan Kattu	Gowri	
1973	Nakhangal	Maya	
1974	Jeevikkan Marannupoya Sthree	Malini	
1974	Bhoomidevi Pushpiniyayi	Meenakshiyamma	
1974	Manyasree Viswamithran	Naani	
1974	Bhoogolam Thiriyunnu	Vatsala	
1974	Poonthenaruvi	Kujanna	
1974	Oru Pidi Ari		
1974	Neelakannukal	Mariyamma	
1974	Nagaram Sagaram		
1974	Arakkallan Mukkalkkallan	Ikkavu	
1974	Chakravakam	Branthi Paru	
1974	Rajahamsam	Shyamala	
1975	Kalyaanappanthal		
1975	Ashtamirohini		
1975	Akkaldaama		
1975	Mucheettukalikkarante Makal	Kochu Thresia	
1975	Priye Ninakku Vendi		
1975	Thiruvonam	Valsala	
1975	Chalanum	Ponnamma	
1975	Cheenavala	Manikya	
1975	Chattambikkalyaani	Gracy	
1975	Neela Ponman	Kotha	
1976	Srishti		
1976	Vanadevatha		
1976	Colonelum Collectorum		
1976	Surveykkallu		
1976	Ponni	Chikki	
1976	Rajaankanam		
1976	Sexilla Stundilla		
1976	Agni Pushpam		
1976	Seemantha Puthran		
1976	Udhyanalakshmi		
1976	Priyamvada		
1976	Themmadi Velappan	Kalyani	
1976	Sindhooram		
1976	Light House	Thankamani	
1976	Prasaadam	Bhageeradi	
1976	Chirikkudukka	Sarasa	
1976	Madhuram Thirumadhuram	Pathumma	
1976	Hiridhayam Oru Kshethram	Kamalakshi	
1977	Tholkan Enikku Manassilla		
1977	Dheerasameere Yamuna Theere		
1977	Makam Piranna Manka		
1977	Veedu Oru Swargam		
1977	Sneha Yamuna		
1977	Penpuli		
1977	Saritha		
1977	Karnaparvam		
1977	Sakhakkale Munnoottu		
1977	Manassoru Mayil		
1977	Yuddhakandam	Rajam	
1977	Harshabashpam	Janaki	
1977	Aanandham Paramaanandham	Lalitha	
1977	Randu Lokam	Savithri	
1977	Kodiyettam	Santhamma (as Lalitha)	
1977	Anugraham	Pankajakshiyamma	
1977	Anthardaaham	Janu	
1977	Sankhupushpam	Aamina	
1978	Pichipoo		
1978	Randu Janmam		
1978	Jayikkaanaay Janichavan	Kalyani	
1978	Nithyavasantham		
1978	Amarsham		
1978	Theerangal		
1978	Kaithappoo		
1978	Vayanadan Thamban		
1978	Ninakku Njaanum Enikku Neeyum	Thankamma	
1978	Urakkam Varaatha Raathrikal	Lalitha	
1978	Kaathirunna Nimisham	Ambujam	
1978	Padmatheertham	Meenakshi	
1978	Beena	Madhavi	
1978	Kudumbam Namukku Sreekovil	Gomathi	
1978	Mukkuvane Snehicha Bhootham	Chirutha	
1978	Kanyaka	Nandini	
1978	Velluvili	Sarasu	
1978	Kaathirunna Nimisham	Ambujam	
1978	Adimakkachavadam	Parvathiyamma	
1978	Aaravam	Alamelu	
1978	Aarum Anyaralla	Parimalam Mary	
1978	Ee Manohara Theeram	Thilakavathi	
1978	Randilonnu	Parvathi	
1978	Rathi Nirvedham	Bharathi	
1979	Peruvazhiyambalam	Kunnumpurath Devayani	
1979	Kayalum Kayarum	Panki	
1979	Pichathy Kuttappan	Chinnamma	
1979	Choola		

==== 1980s ====
Year	Title	Role	Notes
1980	Vilangum Veenayum		
1980	Kadalkkaattu	Mariya	
1980	Dooram Arike	Santhamma	
1980	Aaravam	Alamelu	
1981	Vaadaka Veettile Athidhi (Swapnam Viriyunna Raavukal)		
1981	Arikkaari Ammu		
1981	Nidra	Bhargaviyamma	
1981	Chaatta	Chandramathi	
1981	Ellaam Ninakku Vendi	Thankamani	
1981	Parvathi	Kunjanna	
1981	Palangal	Geetha	
1982	Anthiveyilile Ponnu	Hari's wife	
1982	Ormakkayi	Gopi's sister	
1983	Theeram Thedunna Thira	Madhavi	
1983	Marmaram	Thresiamma	
1983	Kattathe Kilikoodu	Indira Thampi	
1984	Ente Upasana	Gauri	
1984	Atuthaduthu	Kousalya	
1985	Omanikkan Ormavaikkan		
1985	Oduvil Kittiya Vartha		
1985	Manicheppu Thurannappol	Nun	
1985	Orikkal Oridathu	Gouri	
1985	Puli Varunne Puli	Sumathikutty	
1985	Meenamasathile Sooryan	Chirukandan's mother	
1986	Neram Pularumbol		
1986	Kaveri		
1986	Vartha	Madhavankutti's mother	
1986	Ambada Njaane!	Amminiyamma	
1986	Ice Cream	Elizabeth	
1986	Thalavattam	Mental patient	
1986	Vivahitare Itihile	Cicily	
1986	T. P. Balagopalan M.A.	Chandrankutty's wife	
1986	Sanmanassullavarkku Samadhanam	Karthyayani as Lalitha	
1986	Abhayam Thedi	Bhargavi	
1986	Katturumbinum Kathu Kuthu	Janakiyamma	
1986	Yuvajanotsavam	MLA Arundathi	
1986	Pranamam	Appu's sister	
1986	Chilambu	Kamala	
1986	Gandhinagar 2nd Street	Bharathi	
1987	Sruthi	Ramavarma's mother	
1987	Neela Kurinji Poothappol	Omana Kunjamma	
1987	Jaalakam	Savithri	
1988	Samvalsarangal		
1988	Vellanakalude Nadu	Sarojam	
1988	Ponmuttayidunna Tharavu	P.V Panicker's wife	
1988	Pattanapravesham	Shobha's Mother-in-law	
1988	Mukunthetta Sumitra Vilikkunnu	Sumithra's mother	
1988	Puravrutham	Kanaran's wife	
1988	Manu Uncle	Mary	
1988	Kudumba Puranam	Ammini	
1988	Thanthram	Mary	
1989	Ammavanu Pattiya Amali	Sethulakshmi	
1989	Pooram	Sarasu	
1989	Varavelpu	Shantha	
1989	Vadakkunokkiyantram	Dineshan's mother	
1989	Pradeshika Varthakal	Karthyayani Amma	
1989	Peruvannapurathe Visheshangal	Madhaviamma	
1989	Innale	Sosamma	
1989	Dasharatham	Mariyamma	

==== 1990s ====
Year	Title	Role	Notes
1990	Noottonnu Raavukal	Mary	
1990	Radha Madhavam	Padmini	
1990	Vidhyarambham	Bhanumathi's mother	
1990	Thalayanamanthram	Devaki	
1990	Shubha Yathra	Ramettan's wife	
1990	Sasneham	Rosy	
1990	Kattukuthira	Kalyani	
1990	Pavam Pavam Rajakumaran	Radhika's mother	
1990	His Highness Abdullah	Subhadra Varma	
1990	Gajakesariyogam	Madhaviamma	
1990	Dr. Pasupathy	Chandramathi	
1990	Appu	Alamelu	
1990	Akkare Akkare Akkare	Sivadasa Menon's wife	
1990	Kottayam Kunjachan	Aleyamma	
1990	Kashandikku Marumarunnu		
1991	Koodikazhcha		
1991	Kankettu	Sujatha's mother	
1991	Kakkathollayiram	Menon's wife	
1991	Athirathan	Meenakshi	
1991	Ottayal Pattalam	SI Shoshamma	
1991	Sundhari Kakka	Eliyamma	
1991	Kadalora Kattu	Kalyani	
1991	Sandhesam	Anandan's wife	
1991	Nettippattam	Karthyayani Amma	
1991	Ennum Nanmakal	Sathyavathi Amma	
1991	Mukha Chithram	Gomathy	
1991	Kilukkampetti	Saramma	
1991	Keli	Seemanthini	
1991	Kadinjool Kalyanam	Chinnamalu	
1991	Godfather	Kochammini	
1991	Georgekutty C/O Georgekutty	Aleyamma	
1991	Ennathe Programme	Bhageerathi	
1991	Cheppu Kilukkunna Changathi	Kalyanikuttyamma	
1991	Apoorvam Chilar	Marykutty	
1991	Aakasha Kottayile Sultan	Meenakshi	
1991	Amaram	Bhargavi	
1991	Bharatham	Madhavi	
1991	Kanalkkattu	Omana	
1992	Aayushkalam	Dakshayani	
1992	Ennodishtam Koodamo	Ramanunni's sister	
1992	Ezhara Ponnana	Leelavathi	
1992	Malootty	Saraswathi	
1992	My Dear Muthachan	Shantha	
1992	Nakshthrakoodaram	Bhavani	
1992	Sadayam	Devaki	
1992	Aparatha	Arivaal Kochamanni	
1992	Utsava Melam	Kalyani	
1992	Mukhamudra	Kochuthresia	
1992	Ponnurukkum Pakshi	Amminikutty's mother	
1992	Ponnaram Thottathe Rajavu	Dakshayani	
1992	Kizhakkan Pathrose	Pathrose's wife	
1992	Makkal Mahatmyam	Kunjulakshmi Teacher	
1992	Snehasagaram	Janaki	
1992	Kallanum Policum	Prabhakaran's mother	
1992	Chevaler Michael	Cicilykutty's mother	
1992	Vasudha		
1992	Dhanurvedham		
1992	Thiruthalvaadi		
1992	Kallan Kappalil Thanne		
1992	Ente Ponnu Thampuran		
1993	Maanasam		
1993	Kulapathy		
1993	Sakshal Sreeman Chathunni	Pankajam	
1993	Vakkeel Vasudev	Bhavani	
1993	Golanthara Vartha	Sulfath	
1993	Ente Sreekuttikku	Saraswathy	
1993	Kalippattam	Venu's mother	
1993	Bhoomigeetham	Rukmini	
1993	Akashadoothu	Annaamma's sister	
1993	Aalavattam	Govindankutty's mother	
1993	Vietnam Colony	Pattalam Madhavi	
1993	Venkalam	Kunjipennu	
1993	Manichithrathazhu	Bhasura	
1993	Janam	Devaki	
1993	Injakkadan Mathai & Sons	Alikutty	
1993	Bandhukkal Sathrukkal	Mani Ammma	
1993	Ammayane Sathyam	Omanakuttan's mother	
1994	Pradakshinam	Unni's mother	
1994	Vadhu Doctoranu	Dakshayani	
1994	Thenmavin Kombath	Karthu	
1994	Poochakkaru Mani Kettum	Parukutty	
1994	Pidakkozhi Koovunna Noottandu	Chinthamani Ammal	
1994	Sammohanam	Chiruthamma	
1994	The Porter	Ammini	
1994	Pavithram	Punchiri	
1994	Kinnaripuzhayoram	Laxmikutty	
1994	CID Unnikrishnan B.A., B.Ed.	Unnikrishnan's mother	
1995	Mumpe Parakkunna Pakshi		
1995	Sundari Neeyum Sundaran Njaanum	Indu's mother	
1995	Chaithanyam	Kathreena	
1995	Keerthanam	Carmili	
1995	Mimics Action 500	Sharada Teacher	
1995	Vrudhanmare Sookshikkuka	Bhageerathi Thampuratti	
1995	Thacholi Varghese Chekavar	Aliyamma	
1995	Samudhayam	Khadeejumma	
1995	Spadikam	Mary	
1995	Sipayi Lahala	Ratha's mother	
1995	Pai Brothers	Allu	
1995	Minnaminuginum Minnukettu	Shobana's aunt	
1995	Manikya Chempazhukka	Bhama	
1995	Mangalam Veettil Manaseswari Gupta	Kamalakshi	
1995	Avittam Thirunaal Aarogya Sriman	Devayani	
1995	Aadyathe Kanmani	Malavika	
1995	The King	Alexander's wife	
1996	Kanchanam		
1996	Nandagopalante Kusrithikal		
1996	Kumkumacheppu	Muthassi	
1996	Devaraagam	Sankaran's sister	
1996	Harbour	Annamma	
1996	Swapna Lokathe Balabhaskaran	Bhageerathi	
1996	Patanayakan	Kottappuram Yashodha	
1996	Mr. Clean	Bhargavan Pillai's wife	
1996	Kalyana Sowgandhikam	Subhadra	
1996	Aramana Veedum Anjoorekkarum	Kanakam	
1996	Hitler	Gauri's mother	
1996	Kathapurushan	Janamma	
1997	Ikkareyaanente Maanasam		
1997	Oru Mutham Manimutham	Balan's grandmother	
1997	Ishtadhaanam	Shakunthala	
1997	Vaachalam	Vilasini	
1997	Ancharakalyanam	Alamelu	
1997	Mannadiar Penninu Chenkotta Checkan	Gajendra Mannadiyar's wife	
1997	Kottapurathe Koottukudumbam	Madhavi	
1997	Kalyana Kacheri	Arjunan's mother	
1997	Kadhanayakan	Kunjulakshmi	
1997	Churam	Savithri	
1997	Arjunan Pillayum Anchu Makkalum	Sharadhaamma	
1997	Aniyathipraavu	Mini's mother	
1998	Manassum Vishappum		Short film
1998	Aanapara Achamma		
1998	Kusruthi Kuruppu	Meera's mother	
1998	British Market	Mathi Kunjamma	
1998	Manthrikumaran	Chandrika Sundareshan	
1998	Vismayam	Kochammini	
1998	Sreekrishnapurathe Nakshathrathilakkam	Kausalya	
1998	Kanmadam	Yasodha Gopalakrishnan	
1998	Daya	Amina	
1998	Amma Ammaayiyamma	Sekharankutty's aunt	
1999	Swastham Grihabharanam	Balan's wife	
1999	American Ammayi	Ammayi	
1999	English Medium	Snehalatha's mother	
1999	Angene Oru Avadhikkalathu	Kunji	
1999	Niram	Prakash Mathew's grandmother	
1999	Veendum Chila Veettukaryangal	Marykutti	
1999	Megham	Aachamma	

==== 2000s ====
Year	Title	Role	Notes
2000	Nadan Pennum Natupramaniyum	Thankamani	
2000	Melevaryathe Malakhakkuttikal	Menon's mother-in-law	
2000	Swayamvara Panthal	Deepu's mother	
2000	Madhuranombarakattu	Mullathatha	
2000	Varnakkazhchakal	Kunju's mother	
2000	Mark Antony	Kunjavarutha	
2000	Shantam	Narayani	
2000	Life Is Beautiful	Sosamma	
2000	Kochu Kochu Santhoshangal	Jagadamma	
2001	Jameendar		
2001	Chillaksharangal		
2001	Saivar Thirumeni	Sridevi	
2001	Narendran Makan Jayakanthan Vaka	Kunjulakshmi	
2001	Uthaman	Madhavi	
2001	Nariman	Nariman's mother	
2002	Bheri		
2002	Grandmother	Muthassi	
2002	Valkannadi	Kuttiyamma	
2002	Savithriyute Aranjanam	Sarojini	
2002	Kaiyethum Doorath	Bhanumathi	
2002	Chathurangam	Therutha	
2003	Chronic Bachelor	Vimala	
2003	Thilakkam	Devaki	
2003	Ente Veedu Appuvinteyum	Meera's Aunt	
2003	Ammakilikkoodu	Saraswathy Amma	
2003	Varum Varunnu Vannu	Thresiamma	
2003	Manassinakkare	Kunju Maria	
2003	Mayamohithachandran		
2004	Thekkekkara Superfast	Valyammachi	
2004	Thudakkam	Devu	
2004	Pravasam	Amminikutty's mother	
2004	Wanted		
2004	Kadalkaattiloru Dooth	Herself	Documentary film
2004	Oridam		
2004	Govindankutty Thirakkilanu	Yashodamma	
2004	Natturajavu	Achamma	
2004	Sancharram	Amma	
2004	Freedom	Karthiyayani	
2004	Amrutham	Sarojini	
2005	Achuvinte Amma	Kunjala Chedathi	
2005	Police	Ammukutti	
2005	Pauran	Janaki	
2005	Lokanathan IAS	Lokanathan's Amma	
2005	Maraviyude Maanam	Savithri teacher	Telefilm
2006	Adbutham	Chandrasekhara Warrier's mother	Short film
2006	Bharthavu		Short film
2006	Drishtantham		
2006	Rashtram	Annamma	
2006	Arunam	Sarasamma	
2006	Shyamam	Lakshmi's mother	
2006	Rasathanthram	Seethamma	
2006	Aanachandam	Unniyamma	
2006	Bhargavacharitham Moonam Khandam	Shantharam's mother	
2006	Red Salute	Madhaviyamma	
2007	Raakilipattu	Eliama Pothen	
2007	Anchil Oral Arjunan	Vijayan's mother	
2007	Anandabhairavi	Entemma	
2007	Mayavi	Devaki	
2007	Vinodayathra	John Mathew's sister	
2007	Rakshakan	Mukundan's mother	
2007	Aakasham	Lakshmiyamma	
2007	Alibhai	Canteen Ammayi	
2007	Nasrani	Sister	
2007	Katha Parayumpol	School Principal	
2007	Balyam		
2007	Naalu Pennungal	Kamakshi's mother	
2007	Thaniye	Soshamma	
2007	Kangaroo	Jansi's grandmother	
2008	Novel	Nun	
2008	Magic Lamp	Bharathi	
2008	Jubilee	Rahel	
2008	Shalabham	Sharada	
2008	Annan Thambi	Astrologist's sister	
2008	Madampi	Pillai's mother	
2009	Women in Malayalam Cinema	Herself	Documentary film
2009	Swantham Lekhakan	Sarojini Amma	
2009	Sanmanasullavan Appukuttan	Bhama	
2009	Parayan Marannathu	Madhavi's Amma	
2009	Malayali	Meera's mother	
2009	Chemistry	Parvati's grandmother	
2009	Aayirathil Oruvan	Padmavathi	
2009	Bhagyadevatha	Annaamma	
2009	Bhramaram	Sivankutty's amma	
2009	Vairam: Fight for Justice	Avarachan's wife	
2009	Loud Speaker	Kunjannamma	

==== 2010s ====
Year	Title	Role	Notes
2010	Inganeyum Oral	Lalitha Menon	
2010	Kandahar	Pathumma	
2010	Elektra	Fr. Ulahannan's wife	
2010	Oru Small Family	Kalyani	
2010	Punyam Aham	Jayasree's mother	
2010	April Fool	Krishnanunnu's mother	
2010	Annarakkannanum Thannalayathu	Pavithran's mother	
2010	Dhrona 2010	Aathiyamma	
2010	Pramani	Janaki's mother	
2010	Paappi Appacha	Maria	
2010	Kadha Thudarunnu	Omanakkunjamma	
2010	Penpattanam	Shantha	
2010	Plus Two	Valyammachi	
2010	Elsamma Enna Aankutty	Elsamma's Amma	
2010	Best Actor	Lalitha	
2011	Ormayude Amarathu	Herself	Documentary
2011	Manikiakkallu	Chandini's mother	
2011	The Train	Grandmother	
2011	Snehaveedu	Reethamma	
2011	Rathinirvedam	Rathi's mother	
2011	Doctor Love	Nun	
2011	Nadakame Ulakam	Teashop owner	
2011	Kudumbasree Travels	Bhavaniyamma	
2011	Khaddama	Aswathi's mother	
2011	Kanakompathu	Sarasamma	
2011	Kathayile Naayika	Nandini's mother	
2011	Urumi	—N/a	Narrator
2011	Naayika	Sister	
2012	Mullassery Madhavan Kutty Nemom P. O.	Mullassery Parvathy Amma	
2012	Nidra	Ashwathy's Amma	
2012	Hero	Antony's mother	
2012	Thalsamayam Oru Penkutty	TV Audience	
2012	The King & the Commissioner	Joseph's mother	
2012	Molly Aunty Rocks!	Benny's mother	
2012	916	Saradha	
2012	Thanichalla Njan	Chellamma Antharjanam	
2012	Ithramathram	Mariyaamma	
2012	Lumiere Brothers	Herself	Archive footage
2012	Unnam	Basheer's mother	
2012	Perinoru Makan	Saradha	
2012	Ee Thirakkinidayil	Savithri's valarthamma	
2012	Ennennum Ormmakkayi		
2012	Father's Day	Mathan's mother	
2012	Chapters	Elderly woman	
2013	Vallatha Pahayan	Balan's Mother	
2013	Bicycle Thieves	Meera's Landlady	
2013	Oru Saopetty Katha	Soshamma	
2013	Ayaal	Muttakkari	
2013	Nadan	Radhamani	
2013	Good Idea		
2013	Progress Report	Radhika's mother	
2013	August Club	Nandan's mother	
2013	Pullipulikalum Aattinkuttiyum	Chakkattutharayil Madhavi	
2014	My Dear Mummy	Katrina's aunt	
2014	Balyakalasakhi		
2014	Law Point	Thressia	
2014	Vasanthathinte Kanal Vazhikalil	Madhaviyamma	
2014	Vellimoonga	Mamachan's mother	
2014	Njangalude Veettile Athidhikal	Manoj's mother	
2014	Aamayum Muyalum	Mary	
2015	Ottayilathanal	Mollykutty	Telefilm
2015	Compartment	Nun	
2015	Mathru Vandhanam	Mad lady	
2015	Chandrettan Evideya	Valsala	
2015	Thinkal Muthal Velli Vare	Jayadevan's grandmother	
2015	3 Wikattinu 365 Runs	Vasundhara	
2015	Jilebi	Saradha	
2015	Amar Akbar Anthony	Chandrika	
2015	Utopiayile Rajavu	Narayani	
2015	Loham	Ramesh's & Suresh's mother	
2015	Su.. Su... Sudhi Vathmeekam	Sudhi's mother	
2015	Charlie	Rahel Ammachi	
2016	Hello Namasthe	Alice	
2016	Pa Va	Annamma	
2016	White	Valyammachi	
2016	Pinneyum	Teacher	
2016	Kochavva Paulo Ayyappa Coelho	Ammomma	
2016	Paulettante Veedu	Thresiamma	
2017	Fukri	Paatti	
2017	Devayaanam	Devamma	
2017	Sakhavu		Uncredited cameo
2017	Sunday Holiday	Benny's mother	
2017	Varnyathil Aashanka	Vijayalakshmi	
2017	Clint	Onamma	
2017	Adam Joan	Syriac's mother	
2017	Hadiya	Muslim lady	
2017	Eliyammachiyude Aadhyathe Christmas	Eliayamma	
2017	Oru KPAC Kaalam	Herself	Documentary
2018	Aami	Jaanuvamma	
2018	Mohanlal	Sethu's mother	
2018	Uncle	Ammachi	
2018	Aravindante Athidhikal	Kousalyamma	
2018	Theetta Rappai	Eliyamma	
2018	Nonsense		
2018	Njan Prakashan	Pauly Chechi /Servant	
2018	Sthaanam	Annamma	
2019	Mikhael	Mariam	
2019	Vijay Superum Pournamiyum	Vijay's grandmother	
2019	Subharathri	Mother superior	
2019	Kalki	Lalithabhai	
2019	Ittymaani: Made in China	Theyyaama	
2019	Ulta	Lakshmiyamma	

==== 2020s ====
Year	Title	Role	Notes
2020	Varane Avashyamund	Akashavani	
2021	Black Coffee	Herself	Archive footage
2021	Mohan Kumar Fans	Rugmini	
2021	Home	Annamma	Amazon Prime Video film
2022	Bheeshma Parvam	Karthyayaniyamma	Posthumous release
2022	Oruthee	Bharathi	Posthumous release
2022	Veetla Vishesham	Unnikrishnan's mother	Posthumous release
2022	Maamanithan	Mathavan's mother	Posthumous release
2022	Hasyam	Local resident	Posthumous release
2023	Djinn	Sulekha	Posthumous release
2024	Marco	Mariyam Peter	Photo appearance; Posthumous release. Role reprised from Mikhael
2025	Ente Priyathamanu	Anniyamma	Posthumous release
2026	Aval	Ammachi	ManoramaMAX film Posthumous release

=== Tamil ===
Year	Title	Role	Notes
1981	Raja Paarvai	Chitti	
1997	Kadhalukku Mariyadhai	Mini's mother	
2000	Snegithiye	Eliama Pothen	
2000	Alai Payuthey	Karthik's mother	
2005	Ullam Ketkume	Emaan's mother	
2006	Suyetchai MLA	Priya's mother	
2006	Paramasivan	Malar's grandmother	
2007	Kireedam	Shaktivel's grandmother	
2017	Kaatru Veliyidai	Achamma	

== Dubbed voices ==
List of K. P. A. C. Lalitha film dubbing credits
Year	Film	Character	Dubbed for
1971	Aabhijathyam	Malathy	Sharada
1972	Theerthayathra	Savithrikutty	Sharada
1973	Udayam	Geetha	Sharada
1973	Bhadradeepam	Rajani	Sharada
1973	Veendum Prabhatham	Lakshmi	Sharada
1973	Dharmayudham	Meenu	Nanditha Bose
1973	Padmavyooham	Jaya	Vijayasree
1973	Panitheeraatha Veedu	Rachel	Nanditha Bose
1977	Sreedevi	Sreedevi	Sharada
1979	Simhaasanam	Narayani	Lakshmi
1980	Thakara	Subhashini	Surekha
1981	Parankimala	Thankam	Soorya
1990	Mathilukal	Narayani	
2005	Alai Payuthey (D)	Karthik's mother	Herself
2013	Cold Storage	Narrator	Special voice over
2017	Tharangam	Voice over	Uncredited voice over
2017	Duet (D)	Achamma	Herself

== Television serials ==
List of K. P. A. C. Lalitha television serials credits
Year	Title	Role	Channel	Notes
1990s	Manasi		DD Malayalam	
1990s	Kalanum Kandakashani		DD Malayalam	
1995	Akshayapaathram		Asianet	
1998-2000	Sthree		Asianet	
	Samayam		Asianet	
1999	7 Mukhangal		DD Malayalam	
2000	Black and White		Asianet	
2000	Magam		DD Malayalam	
	Naarmadi Pudava			
2001	Avasthantharangal		Kairali TV	
	Aathma			
	Swayamvaram			
2002-2003	Sthreejanmam			
2002	Sparsham		Asianet	
2004	Kochu Thresya Kochu	Thresya	Kairali TV	
2004	Vava		Surya TV	
2004-2005	Dambathya Geethangal		Asianet	
2005	Sindoorarekha		Asianet	
2006	Mounam		Surya TV	
2006	Sathi Leelavathi	Savithri	Amrita TV	
2006	Velutha Kathrina		Kairali TV	
2007	Sathyam	Annamma	Amrita TV	
2007	Hello Mayavi		Surya TV	
2007	Swami Ayappan		Asianet	
2008	Vishudha Thomasleeha		Asianet	
2008	Kathanar Kadamattathu Kathanar	Dhathri	Jaihind TV	
2008	Akkare Ikkare		Asianet	
2010	Pakalmazha		Amrita TV	
2011-2012	Pattukalude Pattu		Surya TV	
2011-2013	Aakashadoothu	Claramma	Surya TV	
2011-2021	Thatteem Mutteem	Mayavathi Amma	Mazhavil Manorama	
2012-2013	Indira		Mazhavil Manorama	
2013	Nagamma			
2016	Marithatteem Mayammutteem			Telefilm
2021	Chakkappazham	Kamala Kunjamma	Flowers TV	

== Dramas ==
- Kakkaponnu
- Bali
- Aswamedham

== Television shows ==
Reality show as Judge

- Sundari Neeyum Sundaran Njanum
- Bharthakkankarude Sradhakku
- Comedy Stars season 2
- Kerala's Favourite Film Actor

Other shows as herself

- Lalithapachakam
- Big Break
- Amma Mazhavillu
- Nalla Nalekkai
- Samagamam
- Lalitham @ 50
- Ruchibhedam
- Onathammamar
- Laluvinte Onam
- Lalitha Sundaramee Vishu
- Dakshinamurthi Music Fest 2018
- Ente Ormakaliloode
- Made for each other
- Manam Thurannu
- Nadanam Venulayam
- Urvasi Theatres
- Ningalkkum Aakaam Kodeeshwaran
- Sangeetha Sangamam
- Sundari Neeyum Sundaran Njanum
- Comedy Utsavam
- Sell Me The Answer
- Comedy Super Nite
- Kathayilithu Jeevitham
- Badayi Bunglavu
- Annie's Kitchen
- Nere Chovve
- On Record
- Close encounter
- A Note Of Legacy
- Shoot n Show
- Katha Ithuvare
- My First Film
- Avar Kandumuttumbol
- Onnum Onnum Moonnu
- JB Junction
- Onakkodi
- Ini Njangal Parayam
- Smile Plz
- Annorikkal
- Lal Salam
- Vellithirayile Pennkaruth
- Ruchibhedam
- Yashodhamarum Yoyo Krishnanum

== Music albums ==
- Ente Malayalam
- Chingapenninu Kannezhuthan
- Ochiravasan
- Amme Kaathukollanne
- Devaragam

== Commercials ==
- Grandmas
- Chavara Matrimony
- ICL Gold Emotion
- LDF
- Radhas
- Kalliyath TMT
