= List of Malayalam films of 1999 =

The following is a list of Malayalam films released in the year 1999.

Opening		Film	Cast	Director	Music director	Notes
J A N	26	Aakasha Ganga	Divya Unni, Mayuri, Riyaz, Mukesh	Vinayan	Berny-Ignatius	
F E B	9	Prem Poojari	Kunchacko Boban, Shalini	Hariharan	Uttam Singh	
F E B	15	Pathram	Suresh Gopi, Manju Warrier, Murali	Joshiy	S. P. Venkatesh	
F E B	17	Angene Oru Avadhikkalathu	Sreenivasan, Samyuktha Varma, Mukesh	Mohan	Johnson	
F E B	18	American Ammayi	Jagathy Sreekumar, KPAC Lalitha, Prem Kumar	G. K. Gouthaman	Sanjeev Lal	
M A R	10	Chandamama	Kunchako Boban, Sudheesh, Sulekha	Murali Krishnan	Ouseppachan	
M A R	19	Bharya Veettil Paramasukham	Vijayaraghavan, Mayoori, Jagathy Sreekumar, Rajan P. Dev	Rajan Sithara		
M A R	26 (Vishu)	Ustaad	Mohanlal, Indraja, Divya Unni	Sibi Malayil	Vidyasagar	
A P R	15	Megham	Mammootty, Priya Gill, Dileep, Sreenivasan	Priyadarshan	Ouseppachan	
A P R	22	Niram	Kunchacko Boban, Shalini, Jomol	Kamal	Vidyasagar	
A P R	25	Udayapuram Sulthan	Dileep, Preetha Vijayakumar, Captain Raju	Jose Thomas	Kaithapram Damodaran Namboothiri	
	April/May	Ezhupunna Tharakan	Mammootty, Namrata Shirodkar	P. G. Viswambharan	Vidyasagar	
M A Y	27	Vasanthiyum Lakshmiyum Pinne Njaanum	Kalabhavan Mani, Kaveri, Praveena	Vinayan	Mohan Sithara	
J U N	28	The Godman	Mammootty, Indraja	K. Madhu		
A U G	10	Pallavur Devanarayanan	Mammootty, Sangita, Thilakan	V. M. Vinu	Raveendran	
A U G	12 (Onam)	Friends	Jayaram, Mukesh, Sreenivasan, Meena, Divya Unni	Siddique	Ilaiyaraaja	
A U G	12 (Onam)	Pattabhishekam	Jayaram, Mohini, Jagathy Sreekumar, Harisree Asokan	P. Anil; Babu Narayanan	Berny Ignatius	
S E P	6	Veendum Chila Veettukaryangal	Jayaram, Thilakan, Samyuktha Varma	Sathyan Anthikad	Johnson	
S E P	24	Pranaya Nilavu	Dileep, Mohini	Vinayan	Berny-Ignatius	
O C T	15	Charlie Chaplin	Prem Kumar, Jagathy Sreekumar, Anju Aravind, Kalpana	P. K. Radhakrishnan	Wilson	
O C T	15	Garshom	Urvashi, Murali	P. T. Kunju Muhammad	Ramesh Narayan	
O C T	15	Olympiyan Anthony Adam	Mohanlal, Meena	Bhadran	Ouseppachan	
O C T	16	Mazhavillu	Kunchako Boban, Preeti Jhangiani, Vineeth	Dinesh Babu	Mohan Sitara	
O C T	20	Vazhunnor	Suresh Gopi, Janardanan, Sangita, Samyuktha Varma	Joshiy	Ouseppachan	
O C T	25	Crime File	Suresh Gopi, Sangita, Vijayaraghavan, Siddique	K. Madhu	Rajamani	
N O V	15	Njangal Santhushtaranu	Jayaram, Abhirami	Rajasenan	Ouseppachan	
D E C	16	Red Indians	Vijayaraghavan, Vikram, Preetha Vijayakumar	Sunil	S. P. Venkatesh	
D E C	18	Tokyo Nagarathile Viseshangal	Mukesh, Jagathy Sreekumar, Vijayaraghavan, Maathu	Jose Thomas	S. P. Venkatesh	
D E C	21	F. I. R.	Suresh Gopi, Indraja, Biju Menon	Shaji Kailas	Rajamani	
D E C	25	Vanaprastham	Mohanlal, Suhasini Mani Ratnam	Shaji N. Karun	Zakir Hussain	
		Aayiram Meni	Manoj K Jayan, Divya Unni, Urvashi, Lalu Alex	I. V. Sasi		
		Agnisakshi	Shobhana, Srividya, Rajit Kapoor	Shyamaprasad		
		Auto Brothers	Jagadish, Harisree Ashokan, Anitha	Nissar		
		Captain	Babu Antony, Vani Viswanath, Kalabhavan Mani, Captain Raju, Jagathy Sreekumar	Nissar	Alleppey Ranganath	
		Chandranudikkunna Dikhil	Dileep, Kavya Madhavan, Biju Menon, Samyuktha Varma, Lal	Lal Jose	Vidyasagar	
		Deepasthambham Mahascharyam	Dileep, Jomol, Sangeetha	K B Madhu		
		English Medium	Mukesh, Sreenivasan, Praveena, Sangeetha, Thilakan	Pradeep Chokli	Raveendran	
		Gaandhiyan	Vijayaraghavan, Sudheesh, Priya Raman, Praveena, Thilakan, Srividya	Sharvi	Nadirshah	
		Independence	Vani Viswanath, Kalabhavan Mani, Khushbu, Indraja, Jagathy Sreekumar	Vinayan	Suresh Peters	
		Jalamarmaram	P Balachandran, Ashwin Thampy	T. K. Rajeev Kumar		
		James Bond	Vani Viswanath, Prem Kumar, Kalabhavan Mani, Indrans	Baiju Kottarakkara	Berny Ignatius	
		Jananaayakan	Babu Antony, Mumtaj, Sai Kumar, Jagathy Sreekumar	Nissar	Alleppey Thangaraj	
		Janani	Siddique, Kavitha, Latheef, Roslin	T. K. Rajeev Kumar		
		Kannezhuthi Pottum Thottu	Manju Warrier, Abbaz, Thilakan, Biju Menon	Rajeevnath		
		My Dear Karadi	Kalabhavan Mani, Prem Kumar, Salim Kumar, Anitha	Sandhya Mohan	Thankaraj	
		Onnaamvattam Kandappol	Sudheesh, Praveena, Harishree Ashokan	K. K. Haridas		
		Panchapaandavar	Vijayaraghavan, Sithara, Kalabhavan Mani, Kasthuri,	K. K. Haridas	Kaithapram	
		Parassala Pachan Payyannur Paramu	Jagathy Sreekumar, Sreenivasan, Sreejaya	P. Venu		
		Pranayamazha	Manoj K. Jayan, Priya Raman, Siddique, Thilakan	Nithin Kumar	Wilson	
		Rishivamsham	Vijayaraghavan, Chanchal	Rajeev Anchal		
		Saaphalyam	Suresh Gopi, Sangita, Kalabhavan Mani	G. S. Vijayan		
		Sparsham	Manoj K. Jayan, Kaveri, Priya Raman	Mohan Roop		
		Stalin Sivadas	Mammootty, Khushbu, Sai Kumar, Captain Raju	T. S. Suresh Babu	M. G. Radhakrishnan	
		Swastham Grihabharanam	Mukesh, Sukanya, Jagathy Sreekumar, Kalpana, KPAC Lalitha	Ali Akbar	Berny Ignatius	
		Thachiledathu Chundan	Mammootty, Vani Viswanath, Thilakan, Nedumudi Venu, Nandhini	Shajoon Kariyal	Raveendran	
		Marana Simhasanam				
		Devadasi				
		Mercara				
