= Jijoy Rajagopal =

Indian film and theatre actor (born 1976)

Jijoy Rajagopalan
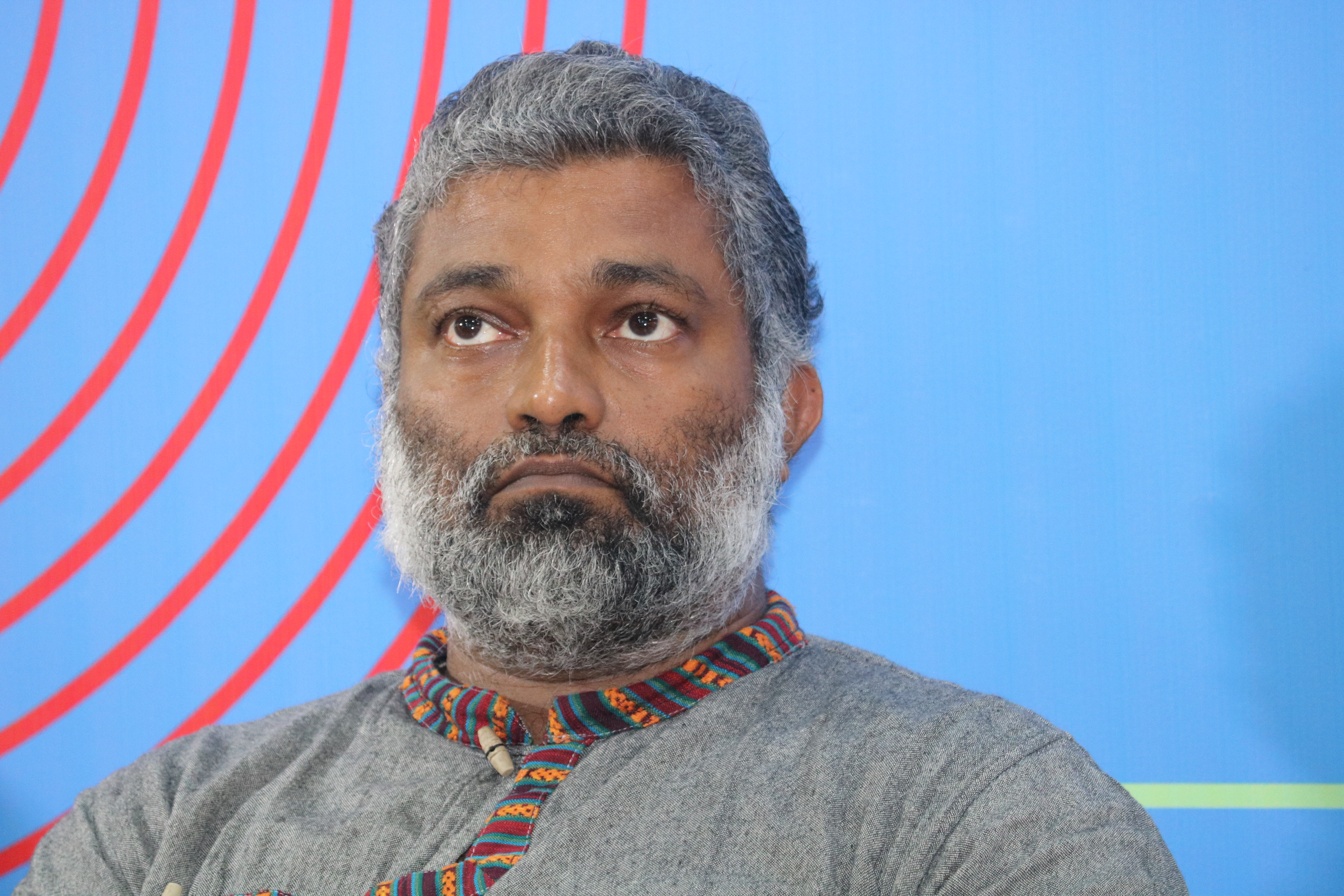
- Jijoy Rajagopal at Kollam sreenarayana guru literature fest 2024
- Born: 1 September 1976 (age 50); Irinjalakuda, Trichur, Kerala
- Education: Christ College, Irinjalakuda, Pondicherry University
- Occupation: Actor
- Years active: 1999–present
- Notable work: Prabhuvinte Makkal, Best Actor, Mosayile Kuthira Meenukal
- Spouse: Riya Mary Philip
- Children: 1

Jijoy P R is an Indian film and theatre actor, former director of K. R. Narayanan National Institute of Visual Science and Arts (KRNNIVSA), Kerala on deputation. He is currently working as associate professor at the Film and Television Institute of India (FTII), Pune and served as the dean of the Films Wing too. He is an international theatre artist who performed 380 shows in Japan, the United Kingdom, Italy, the United States, Dubai, Bahrain, Canada, and Australia.

== Early life and education ==
Jijoy P. R did his schooling at Sree Narayana Higher Secondary School, Irinjalakuda, where he developed his artistic interest through music and theatre. He had completed his pre-degree and Bachelor of Arts in economics from Christ College, Irinjalakuda where he was very active in campus theatre and performed a number of plays. He pursued a Bachelor of Theater Arts specialised in acting in School of Drama and Fine Arts Thrissur. After doing some films and serials, he decided to pursue his studies in M.A. and M.Phil. in drama and theatre arts from Pondicherry University.

== Filmography ==
Year	Title	Role	Notes
1999	Niram	Bhavesh	
1999	Garshom		
1999	Veendum Chila Veettukaryangal	Theater artist	
2000	Swayamvara Panthal	Photographer	
2000	Devadoothan	Varghese Kuruvila	
2001	Meghamalhar	Prasad	
2002	Shivam	Francis	
2002	Gramophone	Documentary director	
2003	Kalavarky		
2003	Melvilasam Sariyanu	Prasad	
2004	Shambu		
2004	Vismayathumbathu	Zacharia	
2004	December	Bony Tharakan	
2005	The Campus	Vishnu	
2005	Nerariyan CBI		
2006	Pakal	Village man	
2006	Drishtantham	Village man	
2007	Drishtaantham	Unni	
2009	Nammal Thammil	Roy Paul	
2009	Janthu	Tribe Man	
2010	Best Actor	Part of the junkie film group	
2010	Kadaksham	Driver	
2010	Pranchiyettan & the Saint	Ad film director	
2011	The Filmstar	Stephen	
2011	Nadakame Ulakam		
2011	Sankaranum Mohananum	Artist	
2011	Veeraputhran	Research Scholar	
2011	Bhakthajanangalude Sradhakku	Saint	
2012	Prabhuvinte Makkal	Mani	
2012	Thiruvambadi Thamban	Asst Director	
2013	Memories	Dr Shami	
2014	Chaayilyam		
2014	Mosayile Kuthira Meenukal	Sulaiman	
2018	Suvarna Purushan	Keerikadan	
2018	Certain Lives in Twilight	A student	
2019	Rakthasakshyam	Hari	
2021	Jai Bhim	Munnar Rajesh	Tamil film
2026	I, Nobody	Palanaadan Malayali	

== As dubbing artist ==
Year	Film	Dubbed for	Role
2010	Shikkar	Jain Syriac Babu	Abdulla's Son
2010	Puthumukhangal	Anoop George	Chitrabhanu
2012	Grandmaster	Arjun Nandhakumar	Roshan Mathew
2012	Asuravithu	Rony David Raj	Danny
2013	Dolls	Rahul Ravi	Dr.Anoop

== Theatre ==
=== Plays acted in ===
Play	Character	Year
Yadhartha Velakkaran	Velakkaran	1987
Redham Nashtappetta Therali	King	1991
Kalyansougandhikam	Chores	1992
Chunari	King	1992
An English Play	Slave	1992
Eechara Raman	Eechara Raman	1993
Janmana Jayathe	Sharody	1993
Swakaryam	Sentry	1994
One for the Road	Nicholas	1995
Higueta	Higueta, Fr.GeVarghese	1996
Ubu Maharaja	Ladislas, Dog	1998
Davyavayi, Sorry	Dayavayi	1997
Mookanarthakan (Dum Dancer)	Madhu (A blind)	1998
Lanka Lakshmi	Vibheeshanan	1997
Mother Courage	Narrator	1997
Randu Anthya Rengangal (Sankskrit, Malayalam)	Duryodhan, Sree Raman	1998
Uyirthezhunelpu		1998
Sketham	Vashisthan	2001
Gandhi	Gandhi	1999
Macbeth	Macbeth	1999
Swarnakokkukal	Sathako	2001
Kadassikkali (The End Game)		2000
Bharathavakyam	Avan	2001
Attrai Kadathai (Tamil)	Chores	2003
Bailyadukal (Tamil)	Chores	2004
Nachathravasi (Star Dweller) Tamil	Naahan	2004
Tsunami	Chores	2005
A Mid Summer Night's Dream	Oberon, Thesius	2006–2008
Randu Anthya Rangangal	Bali, Sree Krishnan	2009
Lila's Stories (Spanish, Malayalam & English)	King	2009
Troy (English)	Ademmnen	2009
The Death of a Government Clerk	Clerk	2013
Tawazun	Usman	2015
Higueta	Fr.Gevarghese	2018
Higueta	Fr.Gevarghese	2018

== Television ==
Program	Director	Character
Innocent Kadhakal	David Kachapilly	Sathyan
Shamathaalam	Shyamaprasad	Roy
Nilamazha	M.G Sasi	Sethu
Janmajaladhi	Murali Menon	Musician
Venalmazha	K.K Rajeev	Sibi
Swapnam	K.K Rajeev	Surya
Mazhayariyaathe	K.K Rajeev	Mukundan
Randaamathoral	Prasad Nooranad	A Killer
Sree Krishnan	Vayalar Madhavankutty	Aghoran
Kadhayile Rajakumari	K.K Rajeev	
Kerala Crime Files - Season 2	Ahammed Khabeer	K9 Squad In-charge
