= Chandranudikkunna Dikkil =

- VCD cover
- Directed by: Lal Jose
- Written by: Babu Janardhanan
- Produced by: Milan Jaleel
- Starring: Dileep; Samyuktha Varma; Kavya Madhavan; Lal; Biju Menon
- Cinematography: S. Kumar
- Edited by: Ranjan Abraham
- Music by: Vidyasagar
- Production company: Moon Star Creations
- Distributed by: Remya; Karthika; Prince
- Release date: 16 April 1999
- Running time: 154 minutes
- Country: India
- Language: Malayalam
- Budget: Rs. 27 lakh

Chandranudikkunna Dikkil (transl. In the direction the Moon rises) is a 1999 Indian Malayalam-language romantic drama film directed by Lal Jose and written by Babu Janardhanan and produced by Milan Jaleel under his banner Galaxy Films. It stars Dileep, Samyuktha Varma, Kavya Madhavan(in her first lead role), Lal, Biju Menon, Jagadish, and Innocent. The music was composed by Vidyasagar.

== Plot ==
The movie starts with Mukundan as a cab driver in Mysuru, Karnataka. He meets Hema during a trip when Hema, who works as a drama artist, gets held up late in the night due to the troupe's bus breaking down. A friendship grows between them. Mukundan shifts his residence due to his roommate's bad behaviour, to the area where Hema lives. One day, when Mukundan reaches to pick up a trip from a lodge, he finds his client Sreeram in a serious condition after a suicide attempt, and Mukundan saves his life by the prompt action of calling emergency medical services. There, he meets the family of his client, which reflects a wonder in him, and finally goes through a flashback in which his past as a bank field officer in a remote Karnataka village is narrated.

Through a series of events, he meets and falls in love with Radha and plans to get married. But her brother Parthan, without knowing the relationship, plans to get Radha married to Sreeram, her lecturer from college. Mukundan falls into a trap conspired by a local goon and money lender, Mukundan's boss (who is on suspension for misappropriation of bank money), and he gets arrested by the police on charges of defrauding the bank. Without knowing the fact that Mukundan is innocent, Radha is forced to marry Sreeram. In a fight that occurs when Mukundan returns to the village, he gets bail, the local goon, Thimmaiah, is killed, and Radha's brother goes to jail, taking the responsibility. Mukundan loses his job and works as a cab driver for a living. We meet Radha again at the hospital as a guilt-stricken wife who cannot transform into a wife in the full and true sense, as she still longs for Mukundan deeply. Due to this negligent behaviour of Radha, Sreeram tries to commit suicide and is brought back to life by Mukundan at the beginning of the movie.

Learning about the miserable condition of Sreeram, Mukundan decides to fake a marriage with Hema and asks Radha to forget him and start a new life as a responsible wife, admitting the change in their lives made by fate. A heartbroken Radha understands the situation and goes into the arms of Sreeram. After Radha's parting, Mukundan asks Hema to return the thaali (nuptial pendant). Hema becomes emotional, and both of them decide to enter into a family life while walking down the temple on a hilltop, where the marriage was faked, which has now turned into a real commitment, hand in hand.

== Cast ==
- Dileep as Mukundan, Hema's Husband and Radha's ex-lover
- Samyuktha Varma as Hema, Mukundan's Love interest, later Mukundan's Wife
- Kavya Madhavan as Radha, Mukundan's ex-love interest and Sreeram's wife
- Biju Menon as Sreeram, Radha's husband
- Lal as Parthan (Radha's brother)
- Jagadish as Sasi (Peon of the bank)
- Indrans as Chandrappan
- Innocent as Anthony (Bank Manager, Mukundan's boss)
- Sukumari as Mother of Sreeram
- Meghanathan as Thimmaiah (Local goon)
- N. F. Varghese as Radha and Parthan's father
- Kuthiravattom Pappu as Velukkutti (Mukundan's roommate)
- Sadiq as Ashokan, cab company owner
- Mariya as a veterinary doctor
- Yamuna as the second wife of Radha and Parthan's father
- Ottapalam Pappan
- James
- Rani as Parthan's Love interest (Special appearance in the song Maya Devakikku Makan Piranne)
- Dileesh Pothan as man at movie theatre (Junior Artist)

== Production ==
=== Development ===
After debuting with Oru Maravathoor Kanavu (1998), Lal Jose decided to direct his next film without any major stars to circumvent criticism that his "previous film was a one hit wonder". During the dubbing of Oru Maravathoor Kanavu, Milan Jaleel, came to Jose and offered a film, preferably with Dileep in the lead role, as he had offered him dates. Lal Jose was given an initial advance of ₹60,000.

Lal Jose had developed a story called Marana Certificate, which revolved around a family after the death certificate of a family member who had absconded so that they could claim his will. On the 53rd day of Oru Maravathoor Kanavu's theatrical run, Jose met with Sreenivasan at the Grand Hotel, where the latter was staying and discussed the thread with him. Impressed, Sreenivasan agreed to write a script based on the idea. However, the idea failed to materialize as Sreenivasan was busy with the shooting and development of Ayal Kadha Ezhuthukayanu (1998) and Friends (1999).

Afterward, Jose started discussions on a story with Babu Janardhanan at Shornur Guest House. They eventually developed the story into Chandranudikkunna Dikkil. The title of the film was based on the title of a song. They had initially decided to cast Dileep as the protagonist and Shalini as the main heroine. During this time Lal Jose was offered a film by Alleppey Ashraf, whose script was written by Fazil under the latter's production house. However, Jose rejected the proposal as he was already committed to the project. The film eventually became Life Is Beautiful (2000) and was directed by Fazil himself.

=== Casting ===
Lal Jose traveled to Chennai to meet Shalini's father to narrate the story. However, he had not given any specific dates to her father. However, Shalini had later been booked for Kamal's Niram (1999), which was happening at around the same time.

Manju Warrier (who had by then married Dileep) suggested that Jose look for a new actress for the role. During this time, at Shornur Guest House, Jose met Kavya Madhavan and her mother, who were shooting for Kattathoru Penpoovu (1998). Lal Jose had known the family since Pookkalam Varavayi (1991), in which he was assistant director. Jose started considering Kavya Madhavan in the role of Radha and introduced his thoughts to Dileep and Warrier, who agreed with him. Initially hesitant, Madhavan's parents agreed to the offer. Madhavan was 14 years old at the time.

Impressed with Samyuktha Varma's performance in Veendum Chila Veettukaryangal (1999), Jaleel went and spoke with Varma's parents and she was cast in the role of Hema. Jose narrated the story to Varma's parents via phone, as he was in Mysore finalizing locations for the film. On set, Varma met Biju Menon before they were married in 2002.

=== Filming ===
The muhurat shot took place at Mysore and Vishnuvardhan was invited for the switch on of the film. The climatic scene was also filmed in Mysore. Jose hadn't finalized where the rest of the filming will take place. The makers were looking for a village to shoot in. After the Mysore schedule ended, Jose ran into director Sarathchandran Wayanad, who was in Mysore for the shooting of a documentary. Jose discussed possible locations for the film.

Jose was searching for a rural location with a lot of domestication. After visiting several villages on a road trip, they reached a dead end. While they were in Hogenakkal in Tamil Nadu, Sarathchandran contacted Jose from Wayanad and informed him of a village near Gundlupete in Karnataka named Kakalathundi that matched his conditions. After the completion of shooting, Jaleel offered Jose a second-hand Maruti 800.

The film was edited using Avid. It was the second Malayalam film to use the software after Kannezhuthi Pottum Thottu (1999). The editor, Ranjan Abraham, had done a one-year course conducted by Avid Technology. The film was edited at Navodaya Studios, which supported Avid. The film was also the first Malayalam film to have an ad promotion.

== Soundtrack ==
Chandranudikkunna Dikkil

Soundtrack album by Vidyasagar
- Released: 1999
- Genre: Feature film soundtrack
- Length: 35:31
- Label: Satyam Audios
- Producer: Vidyasagar

Vidyasagar chronology
Pooparika Varugirom (1995)	Chandranudikkunna Dikkil (1999)	Dreamz (2000)

All lyrics are written by S. Ramesan Nair; all music is composed by Vidyasagar.

No.	Title	Artist(s)	Length
1.	"Ambadi Payyukal"	K. J. Yesudas, Sujatha Mohan	5:34
2.	"Ambadi Payyukal"	Sujatha Mohan	5:34
3.	"Maya Devakikku"	K. S. Chitra, Sriram, Vishwanathan	5:23
4.	"Oru Kunju Poovinte"	K. J. Yesudas (Humming by Sujatha Mohan)	3:50
5.	"Chandra"	Shruthi, Dileep	2:24
6.	"Thei Oru Thenavayal"	S. P. Balasubrahmanyam, M. G. Sreekumar, Sujatha Mohan	4:40
7.	"Bombaattu Hudugi"	M. G. Sreekumar, Sujatha Mohan	4:36
8.	"Manju Peyyana"	Sujatha Mohan	4:50
9.	"Theme Song"	Vidyasagar, Chorus	4:50

== Release ==
Chandranudikkunna Dikkil was the first Malayalam film to release a promotional album. The album was shot by Biju Vishwanath. In an interview with Safari TV, Lal Jose said that the reason they did a promotional album was because the film was named after a song with the same name, and he wanted to break that image from the minds of the masses.

=== Reception ===
The film was a commercial success. The film collected Rs. 18 lakhs from the Malabar region and collected Rs. 7 lakhs from the Ernakulam region and Rs. 1 lakh from the Travancore region. According to Lal Jose, the film was able to recover its initial production cost, but due to a fight between the co-producers the film was unable become a successful venture for them.

== Awards ==
Kerala Film Critics Association Awards

- Vidyasagar won Kerala Film Critics Award for Best Music Director for the film.
- Sujatha Mohan won Kerala Film Critics Association Award for Best Female Playback Singer award for the songs Manju Peyyana and Ambadi Payyukal
