= Jayaram =

Indian actor (born 1964)

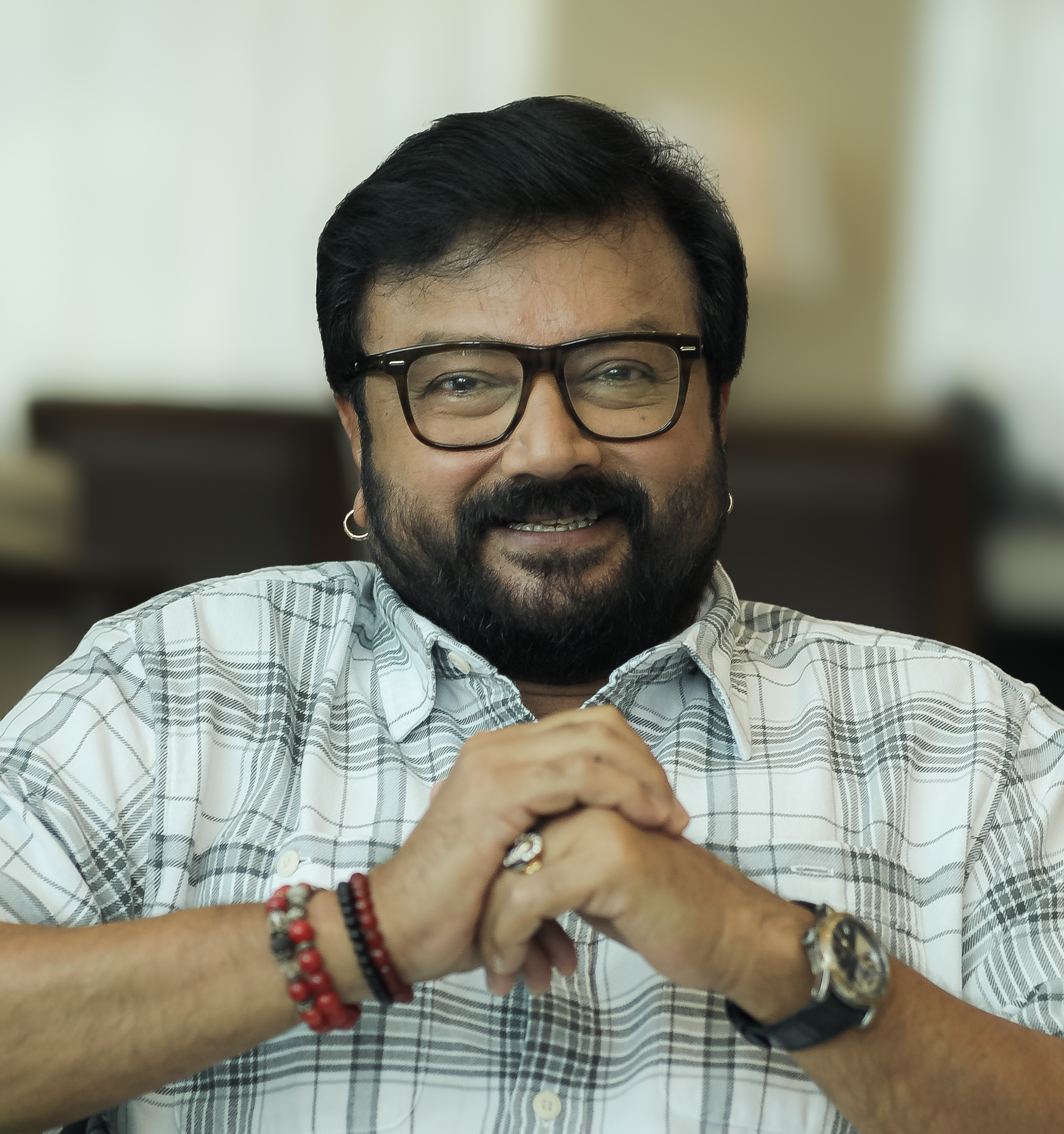
- Jayaram in 2026
- Born: Jayaram Subramaniam; 10 December 1964 (age 61); Perumbavoor, Kerala, India
- Education: Sree Sankara College
- Occupation: Actor
- Years active: 1988–present
- Works: Full list
- Spouse: Parvathy Jayaram (m. 1992)
- Children: 2, Kalidas Jayaram,Malavika
- Awards: Padma Shri (2011)

Jayaram Subramaniam (born 10 December 1964), known mononymously as Jayaram, is an Indian actor who works predominantly in Malayalam cinema, in addition to Tamil, Telugu, Kannada, Hindi and Sanskrit films. He is also a chenda percussionist, mimicry artist, and occasional playback singer. Jayaram has acted in more than 200 films and received several awards, including the Padma Shri, two Kerala State Film Awards, two Kerala Film Critics Association Awards, one Tamil Nadu State Film Awards, one South Indian International Movie Awards, four Filmfare Awards South and seven Asianet Film Awards. He became one of the stars of the Malayalam film industry through the film Meleparambil Aanveedu (1993) which was directed by Rajasenan.

Jayaram started as a mimicry artist at the Kalabhavan Institute during the 1980s. He made his acting debut in a leading role in Padmarajan's 1988 film Aparan. He established himself as a successful leading actor in the 1990s by starring in family dramas and comedies—such as Peruvannapurathe Visheshangal (1989), Shubhayathra (1990), Sandhesam (1991), Georgootty C/O Georgootty (1991), Malootty (1992), Ayalathe Adheham (1992), Meleparambil Aanveedu (1993), CID Unnikrishnan B.A., B.Ed. (1994), Puthukkottayile Puthumanavalan (1995), Aniyan Bava Chetan Bava (1995), Thooval Kottaram (1996), Krishnagudiyil Oru Pranayakalathu (1997), Summer in Bethlehem (1998), Veendum Chila Veettukaryangal (1999), One Man Show (2001), and Manassinakkare (2003).

The 2000 Tamil film Thenali won him five Tamil Nadu State Film Awards. Jayaram won his first Kerala State Film Award, the Special Jury Award, for his performance in Thooval Kottaram (1996). He won the Kerala State Film Award for Second Best Actor for his performance in Swayamvara Panthal (2000). Jayaram won the Filmfare Award for Best Actor three times, for his performances in Thooval Kottaram (1996), Theerthadanam (2001), and Manassinakkare (2003). In 2011, the Government of India honoured him with Padma Shri, the fourth highest civilian award in the country for his contributions to the Indian film industry.

== Early life ==
Jayaram Subramaniam is the second among three children of late Subramaniyam and late Thankam. His father was from Perumbavoor, Kerala. He often referred as his mother tongue is Tamil. He had an elder brother named Venkataram, who died at a young age, and a younger sister named Manjula. He completed his primary education from Government Boys High School, Perumbavoor. He graduated with a bachelor's degree from Sree Sankara College, Kalady and learnt Chenda under the guidance of guru Pallassana Nandakumar. He became a medical representative soon after college and later joined the Kalabhavan Institute where he learned and performed mimicry at stage venues, paving the way to his acting career in films. Malayalam writer Malayattoor Ramakrishnan is Jayaram's maternal uncle.

== Career ==
After college, Jayaram joined Kalabhavan, a professional mimicry troupe in Kochi. At the age of 22, he was introduced to the cinema by script writer and filmmaker Padmarajan who gave Jayaram a launch pad with the 1988 film Aparan. Jayaram subsequently acted in Padmarajan's Moonnam Pakkam (1988) and Innale (1989). Padmarajan became his mentor in his film career until the former's death in January 1991. He achieved stardom in the Malayalam film industry through Meleparambil Aanveedu (1993), which was directed by Rajasenan. The film was a commercial success. He starred alongside Shobana in Innale, Meleparambil Aanveedu and Dhwani, and was praised for his chemistry with the actress.

He is known for appearing in Kamal's films during the late 1980s and early 1990s, including Pradeshika Varthakal (1989), Peruvannapurathe Visheshangal, (1989) and Shubha Yathra (1990) (all scripted by Ranjith), where he co-starred with his wife Parvathy. He later starred in Witness (1988). He teamed up with Viji Thampi and Ranjith in Nanma Niranjavan Srinivasan (1990), where he played a police constable who is in search of a criminal played by Mukesh. During the early 1990s, he acted in Bharathan's Keli (1991) and Malootty (1992).

Jayaram has acted in several of Sathyan Anthikkad's films. Their first film was Ponmuttayidunna Tharavu (1988). Around that time, Jayaram played a supporting role in Sathyan Anthikkad's Artham,Mazhavilkavadi (1989). Thalayanamanthram (1990) and Sandesham (1991), were both written and co-starred Sreenivasan. Anthikkad and Jayaram later went on to make Thooval Kottaram (1996), which was a commercial success, continued their success in films - Irattakuttikalude Achan (1997), Veendum Chila Veettukaryangal (1999), Kochu Kochu Santhoshangal (2000), Yathrakarude Sradhakku (2002), Manassinakkare (2003), Bhagya Devatha and Kadha Thudarunnu.

He regularly cast K.P.A.C Lalitha, Unnikrishnan and Jagathy Sreekumar in his films.

Jayaram starred alongside Mammootty and Suresh Gopi in Joshi's Dhruvam (1993). Other films with Gopi include Viji Thampi's Nagarangalil Chennu Raparkam (1990), Thooval Sparsam (1990), Jayaraj's Paithrukam (1993), and Sibi Malayil's Summer in Bethlehem (1998). He co-starred with Mohanlal in Bharath Gopi's Ulsavapittennu, Peruvannapurathe Visheshangal (1989) and Priyadarshan's Advaitham (1991).

His association with director Rajasenan created many movies such as Kadinjool Kalyanam (1991), Ayalathe Addeham (1992), Meleparambil Aanveedu (1993), CID Unnikrishnan B.A., B.Ed. (1994), Aniyan Bava Chetan Bava (1995), Aadyathe Kanmani (1995), Swapna Lokathe Balabhaskaran (1996), and Kadhanayakan (1997). He also played Aravindan in Siddique's Friends (1999) in which he co-starred with Sreenivasan and Mukesh was the highest grossing Malayalam movie of 1999 and collected ₹11 crore. In the first decade of the 21st century his commercial successful films include Kochu Kochu Santhoshangal (2000), Yathrakarude Sradhakku (2002), Ente Veedu Appuvinteyum (2003), Manassinakkare (2003), Veruthe Oru Bharya (2008). His critically acclaimed roles include Karunakaran in B. Kannan's Theerthadanam (2001) and Lonappan in Rajeev Kumar's Sesham (2002).

He also forayed into Tamil cinema including roles in Gokulam, Purushalakshanam, Priyanka, Kolangal, Murai Mamman and Pathini. He played the roles of Dr Kailash and Ayyappan Nair in the Kamal Haasan-starred Thenali and Panchathanthiram. They first came together on-screen in Chanakyan (1989). Recently, he has done more supporting roles in Tamil, such as antagonist roles in Saroja and Dhaam Dhoom, and a comic role in Aegan.

His movies include Manassinakkare (2003), Njaan Salperu Raman Kutty (2004), Finger Print (2005), Alice in Wonderland (2005), Madhuchandralekha (2006), Moonnamathoral (2006), and Anchal Oral Arjunan (2007). In mid-2008, he played Sugunan in Akku Akbar's Veruthe Oru Bharya (2008) and Thuppakki (2012), which established him as one of the leading comedy actors of Malayalam and Tamil films.

In 2008, he made a comeback after a series of commercial flops with the film Veruthe Oru Bharya (2008), which was a critical and commercial success at the box office.

In 2009, he performed in Sathyan Anthikkad's Bhagyadevatha, a commercial success and Happy Husbands in 2010, which was a commercial success. He later starred alongside Sathyan Anthikkadu for Kadha Thudarunnu. In 2011, he was featured in commercially successful films including Makeup Man, as well as comedic roles in Seniors and Chinatown and Swapna Sanchari. He then acted in films such as Aadupuliyattam (2016) and Pattabhiraman (2019). He played an important role Azhwarkkadiyan Nambi alias Thirumala in Mani Ratnam historical action adventure Ponniyin Selvan: I (2022) and Ponniyin Selvan: II (2023). In the beginning of 2024 Jayaram, re-entered Malayalam cinema in Abraham Ozler, directed by Midhun Manuel Thomas. The movie stars Jayaram as a veteran cop, Abraham Ozler, who is hunting for a serial killer. Abraham Ozler received mixed reviews from critics and the film made a total collection of ₹40.05 crore from the worldwide box office in first 30 days of its release. The film emerged as the all-time highest grossing solo film in the career of its leading man Jayaram within its lifetime run at the theatres. The end of the film hints a sequel and Jayaram after the success of the film confirmed Abraham Ozler 2.

== Personal life ==
Jayaram married actress Parvathy on 7 September 1992. Their son, Kalidas Jayaram, is an actor and won the National Film Award for Best Child Artist in 2003 for his second movie Ente Veedu Appuvinteyum. The couple also has a daughter, Malavika. Currently, the family resides at Valasaravakkam, Chennai, Tamil Nadu. Jayaram is a trained Chenda player and regularly performs at various temple festivals.

== Awards ==
Civilian awards

- 2011 – Padma Shri

Kerala State Film Awards

- 1996 – Special Jury Award – Thooval Kottaram
- 2000 – Second Best Actor – Swayamvara Panthal
- 2001 – Special Jury Award – Sesham

Tamil Nadu State Film Awards

- 2000 – Special Prize – Thenali

Filmfare Awards

- 1996 – Best Actor – Thooval Kottaram
- 2001 – Best Actor – Theerthadanam
- 2002 – Best Supporting Actor (Tamil) – Panchathantiram
- 2003 – Best Actor – Manassinakkare

Asianet Film Awards

- 1998 – Best Actor Award – Sneham
- 2001 – Best Actor Award – Theerthadanam, Uthaman
- 2008 – Most Popular Actor Award – Veruthe Oru Bharya
- 2011 – Most Popular Actor Award – Swapna Sanchari
- 2012 – Special Commomeration
- 2014 – Golden Star of the year
- 2018 - Golden Star of the year

Asianet Comedy Awards

- 2015 - Best Actor - Thinkal Muthal Velli Vare
- 2017 - Best Actor - Achayans

South Indian International Movie Awards

- 2012 – Nominated – Best Comedian - Tamil – Thuppakki
- 2019 – Nominated – SIIMA Award for Best Actor in a Negative Role – Telugu for Bhaagamathie
- 2021 – Won – Special Appreciation Award for Namo
- 2023 – Nominated – SIIMA Award for Best Actor in a Negative Role – Telugu for Dhamaka

Other awards

- 1993 – Cinema Express Award for Best New Face Actor (Tamil) for Gokulam
- 1996 – Sini Best Actor Award for Thooval Kottaram
- 1996 – Rotary Club Award for Thooval Kottaram
- 2002 – Mathrubhumi - Medimix Film Award for Best Actor for Theerthadanam
- 2002 – V. Shantaram Award for Sesham
- 2002 – Cinema Express Award for Best Actor for Sesham
- 2005 – Best Dairy Farmer award by Department of Agriculture Development & Farmers' Welfare (Kerala)
- 2008 – J. C. Daniel Foundation Award for Best Actor for his performance in Veruthe Oru Bharya
- 2011 – Sathyan Award for Lifetime Achievement
- 2011 – Jaihind TV Film Award for Best Actor for Kadha Thudarunnu
- 2012 – Best Dairy Farmer award by Department of Agriculture Development & Farmers' Welfare (Kerala)
- 2014 – Vayalar Film Award for Best Actor for Nadan and Swapaanam
- 2014 – M. K. K. Nair Puraskaram by Kerala Kalamandalam
- 2014 – Pravasi Kalashri Award by Kerala Sangeetha Nataka Akademi for Chenda Melam
- 2021 – Won Special Mention in State-level Farm Awards by Department of Agriculture Development & Farmers' Welfare (Kerala)
- 2022 – Best Farmer award by Department of Agriculture Development & Farmers' Welfare (Kerala)
