= Prabhuvinte Makkal =

- Directed by: Sajeevan Anthikad
- Written by: Sajeevan Anthikad
- Produced by: M. Sindhu
- Starring: Vinay Forrt; Swasika; Madhu; Kalabhavan Mani; Salim Kumar; Jijoy Rajagopal; Tovino Thomas
- Cinematography: Manoj Narayanan; Manju Lal
- Edited by: Pradeep Shankar
- Music by: Arakkal Nandakumar; Joy Cheruvathur
- Production company: Free Thought Cinema
- Distributed by: Free Thought Cinema
- Release date: 26 October 2012
- Running time: 174 minutes
- Country: India
- Language: Malayalam

Prabhuvinte Makkal is a 2012 Indian Malayalam-language drama film written and directed by Sajeevan Anthikad (in his directorial debut) and starring Vinay Forrt, Jijoy Rajagopal, Swasika, and Madhu. The film discusses the theme of atheism. It was the debut film of Tovino Thomas.

== Plot ==
The film centres around a septuagenarian industrialist called Dayadananda Prabhu. He has two sons, Mani and Siddhartha. Mani is a confirmed atheist. But Siddhartha, in spite of being a physics student, and completing post-graduation in it with high grades, is more into spiritualism and oriental occult. Prabhu wants Siddhartha to marry Devika his classmate, and join the same college as lecturer. But by this time, Sidhartha is hopelessly enamored by spiritualism and the works of Fritjof Kapra, the Austrian born American physicist. He suddenly leaves home to Hrishikesh, the sacred place of Hindus; he is in search of a guru who can teach him Ashtasiddhi (the eight divine yogic powers).

Siddhartha spends almost seven years in Hrishikesh and comes across many divine men and gurus there. At the end of his spiritual wanderings, he achieves ‘realization’ of the dark and diabolic side of spiritual industry and returns home. Coming back to his village after eleven years, Siddhartha is overwhelmed at the sight of religious revival. Even Prabhu who was once an irreligious man has become the devotee of a god man. He is also surprised to know that Devika still remains unmarried.

Prabhu is about to hand over 60 acres of his land to the god man to build a super specialty hospital. Siddhartha objects to the plan. Before the assets are transferred, Prabhu dies in a car accident. With the help of his brother Mani and Devika, Siddhartha investigates the circumstances of his father's death. He is also assisted by Adithya, the Deputy Superintendent of Police.

== Cast ==
- Madhu as Dayadananda Prabhu, Siddharathan's and Mani's father
- Vinay Forrt as Siddharthan
- Swasika as Siddharathan's fiancé
- Jijoy as Mani, Siddharathan's brother
- Kalabhavan Mani as the police officer
- Prakash Bare as the god-man
- Jose Valloor as politician
- Salim Kumar
- Arun as Rajayogi Sukhdev
- Tovino Thomas as Che Guevara Surendran
- Ambika Mohan
- Kulappulli Leela
- Narendra Nayak as Himself (cameo appearance)

== Production ==
Prabhuvinte Makkal is the debutant venture of Sajeevan Anthikkad, who has some previous experience in documentary films. The story is loosely based on the life of a real person, who was known for his atheist views.

The film was blocked on YouTube on 11 February 2015. It was uploaded on YouTube on 8 January 2015 by the Kerala Freethinkers Forum, a rationalist and secularist group. Other videos uploaded by the forum on religious bigotry, superstition, and rationalism were also blocked. According to the director, Hindu communal forces were behind the block.

== Reception ==
Paresh.C.Palicha of Rediff.com rated the film 2 out of 5 stars and said that the film "has some interesting insights into religious thought but peters out along the way." He concluded his review writing, "On the whole, Prabhuvinte Makkal, turns out to be a let down because it promised a lot before the release."
