= Melvilasam Sariyanu =

- Directed by: Pradeep Chokli
- Produced by: Shatrukhnan
- Music by: K. L. Sreeram
- Release date: 12 September 2003
- Country: India
- Language: Malayalam

Melvilasam Sariyanu is a Malayalam-language film. It was released on 12 September 2003.

== Cast ==
- Vineeth Kumar as Nandakumar
- Karthika as Geethu
- Suchitha
- Anju Aravind as Nandakumar sister
- Janardanan as Menon
- Jagathy Sreekumar
- Sudheesh as Mimics Magic Madhana Mohanan
- Kalpana as
- Hareesre Ashokan Thabalist Pushkaran
- Ponnamma Babu
- Jijoy Rajagopal as Prasad
- Jose Pellisseri as Gokulettan

== Soundtrack ==
The film's soundtrack contains 9 songs, all composed by K. L. Sreeram and Lyrics by Gireesh Puthenchery.

#	Title	Singer(s)
1	"Dooreyo"	K. L. Sreeram
2	"Kannikkaavadi"	Sujatha Mohan
3	"Neelakuyile Odakkuzhaloothi Oothi Vaa"	Vidhu Prathap, Ajimol
4	"Puzhapadum"	P. Jayachandran
5	"Puzhapadum (D)"	P. Jayachandran, Sujatha Mohan
6	"Thaazhampoo"	V. Devanand, Aparna Ramachandran
7	"Thaazhvaaram"	Ranjini Jose
8	"Thiruthaalathudi Venam"	K. L. Sreeram
9	"Vadaamallippoovum"	Madhu Balakrishnan
