= Golanthara Vartha =

- Poster
- Directed by: Sathyan Anthikad
- Written by: Sreenivasan
- Produced by: B. Sasikumar
- Starring: Mammootty; Shobana; Sreenivasan; Kanaka
- Cinematography: Vipin Mohan
- Edited by: K. Rajagopal
- Music by: Johnson
- Production company: Mudra Arts
- Release date: 23 December 1993
- Running time: 133 Minutes
- Country: India
- Language: Malayalam

Golanthara Vartha (English: Global News) is a 1993 Malayalam film directed by Sathyan Anthikad, written by Sreenivasan, and produced by B. Sasikumar. It stars Mammootty, Shobana, Sreenivasan, and Kanaka in the main roles.

== Plot ==
Rameshan Nair is the owner of a provisional and grocery shop and is happily married to Lekha, a school teacher. The entire village is proud of Rameshan Nair due to his honesty, social work, and courage to fight against social injustice. Even the local police are fed up since the people trust him.

Rameshan Nair takes the onus of transforming a local goon, Karakuttil Dasan, into a noble person. He plans to get him married so that he understands his responsibilities. A few elderly men in the village, along with Dasan, prefer Rajani as Dasan's wife. Rameshan Nair opposes the proposal since Rajani is a prostitute. He had witnessed Rajani being caught by the police during a hotel raid. The news of Rajani being a prostitute spreads rapidly, resulting in her family members disowning her. Further, she also loses her job as a school teacher. Not being able to bear the humiliation, Rajani confronts Rameshan Nair and informs him that she had visited the hotel for a job interview and the police had mistakenly arrested her. The court later released her since she was proven innocent. Rameshan Nair visits the police station and is convinced of her innocence. He feels guilty and tries to persuade her family members and the school (where she lost her job) but none accept her.

Rameshan Nair explains the situation to his friend, Hassan, who agrees to support him. Hassan informs that Rajani could stay at Safiyatha's house till she secures a job. However, Safiyatha would only allow married people to stay. Hence, Rameshan Nair and Rajani should act like husband and wife. Initially, he is reluctant to act as her husband but agrees since he feels responsible for Rajani's current situation. Rameshan Nair also assumes that the husband's act would be short-lived as Rajani would leave the house once she is independent. He ensures that there is no physical contact between him and Rajani. He does not inform his wife about Rajani when his mother says that Lekha would be hurt and divorce him.

The news of Rameshan Nair's extramarital affair spreads in his village. Lekha is deeply hurt and believes in her husband's relationship. Later, Rajani meets Lekha and tells her the entire story. Rajani informs that Lekha must be proud to have a husband like Rameshan Nair, who is sincerely committed to their relationship and loves Lekha a lot. The story ends with Rajani leaving for the Middle East as she has secured a job and Rameshan Nair living happily with Lekha.

== Cast ==
- Mammootty as Rameshan Nair
- Shobana as Lekha
- Kanaka as Rajani
- Sreenivasan
- Oduvil Unnikrishnan as Susheelan
- Sankaradi as the Panchayat President
- Mamukkoya as Kuruppu
- Nedumudi Venu as Hassan
- Bobby Kottarakkara as Sahadevan
- K. P. A. C. Lalitha as Sulfath
- Sukumari as Rameshan's mother
- Karamana Janardanan Nair as Kunjambu
- Meena Ganesh as Sharada
- Manju Pillai as Shobha
- Ottapalam Pappan as M.K. Surendharan, Postman.
- Ragini as Ratnavalli
- C. I. Paul as Sub-Inspector Irumban George
- Lalithasree as Valsala Teacher
- Santhakumari as the headmistress
- Kozhikode Narayanan Nair as Jagannathan
- Salu Kuttanadu
- Omana Ouseph as Annama

== Soundtrack ==
Golanthara Vartha

Soundtrack album by Johnson
- Genre: Film
- Language: Malayalam

The film features songs composed by Johnson and lyrics written by O.N.V. Kurup.

Track	Song title	Singer(s)
1	Iniyonnupaadu	K. J. Yesudas
2	Pandumaalokar	M.G. Sreekumar, chorus
3	Ponnambili	K.S. Chithra
