= Angene Oru Avadhikkalathu =

- Directed by: Mohan
- Screenplay by: Nedumudi Venu; Mohan; P. K. Bharathan
- Story by: Nedumudi Venu
- Produced by: Rajan Alath
- Starring: Sreenivasan; Samyuktha Varma; Mukesh
- Cinematography: Sunny Joseph; Venu
- Edited by: Ajithkumar; K. R. Bose; Beena Paul
- Music by: Johnson
- Production company: Vrindhavan Pictures
- Distributed by: Vrindhavan
- Release date: 5 November 1999
- Country: India
- Language: Malayalam

Angene Oru Avadhikkalathu (transl. In that vacation) is a 1999 Indian Malayalam-language drama film directed by Mohan and written by Nedumudi Venu, Mohan and P. K. Bharathan from a story by Nedumudi Venu. It stars Sreenivasan, Samyuktha Varma, and Mukesh. The music was composed by Johnson. Angene Oru Avadhikkalathu won two Kerala State Film Awards: Best Music Director and Best Female Singer.

== Plot ==
Balakrishnan ("Balan") teaches history at a primary school in a hillside community. In the same school, Nirmala was recently hired for a temporary position as a music teacher. Despite falling in love with Nirmala, Balakrishnan is too shy to admit his feelings. Balan decides to go with Nirmala to her ancestral village in an effort to grow closer to her. On the way, Balan runs across his old friend Babu, whom he hasn't seen in a long time.

Balan and Nirmala are brought to a hotel by Babu. Balan calls an ambulance when Nirmala passes out there. Nirmala requests Balan to drop her off at the bus stop once she has recovered. Balan agrees after observing her distress. When Teena arrives, she claims that her father's close friend, Papachan, has been pressuring her to sleep with one of his wealthy friends. She approaches Balan, terrified, for assistance. Teena accepts Balan and Nirmala's invitation to go with them.

Teena gets hurt when the group is attacked by goons on their route. Teena is alleges that she is assaulted by Balan. Even Nirmala accuses Balan to protect herself, which really hurts him. Balan is imprisoned.

Balan encounters Nandakumar (referred to as "Nandan") on the bus after leaving prison and tells him everything that happened. The two get along quite well, and Nanda gets Balan a great job. Balan is unaware that Nanda is about to marry Nirmala.

After a series of incidents, Nirmala and Balan finally cross paths. Nirmala is questioned by Balan about why she made the false claim about being attacked. According to Nirmala, Papachan persuaded her into doing so. The confusion has been resolved. When Nanda finds out about Nirmala and Balan's relationship, he asks Nirmala if she still has feelings for him. Nirmala, overcome with emotion, says yes. Nanda walks off from the pair, giving them time to make up.

== Cast ==
- Sreenivasan as Balakrishnan / Balan
- Samyuktha Varma as Nirmala, Balakrishnan's Love Interest
- Mukesh as Nandakumar / Nandan, Balakrishnan's Roommate and Nirmala's Fiancé
- Saikumar as Babu Vijayanath, Balakrishnan's Friend
- Innocent as Headmaster Kaimal
- Nedumudi Venu as Delhi Pappachan
- Cochin Haneefa as Physical Education Instructor Jose Panachikkadan
- K. P. A. C. Lalitha as Kunji, Kaimal's Wife
- Unnikrishnan Namboothiri as Parameshwara Warrier, Nirmala's Uncle
- James as Pappachan's Helper
- Ottapalam Pappan as Peon Shibu
- Roslin as Nirmala's Mother
- Valsala Menon as Balakrishnan's Grandmother
- Paravoor Ramachandran as Contractor
- Lissy Jose as Nandakumar's Sister

== Soundtrack ==
All lyrics are written by Gireesh Puthenchery; all music is composed by Johnson.

No.	Title	Artist(s)	Length
1.	"Pular Veyilum"	M. G. Sreekumar, K. S. Chithra
2.	"Raavil Meghapakshi Paadunnu"	Sujatha

== Awards ==
Kerala State Film Awards

- Best Female Singer: K. S. Chithra ("Pular Veyilum")
- Kerala State Film Award for Best Music Director: Johnson
