= Crime File =

- Poster
- Directed by: K. Madhu
- Written by: A. K. Sajan; A. K. Santhosh
- Produced by: A. Ramakrishnan; Sajan Varghese
- Starring: Suresh Gopi; Siddique; Sangita Madhavan Nair; Vijayaraghavan; Rajan P. Dev
- Cinematography: Saloo George
- Edited by: K. Sankunny
- Music by: Rajamani
- Distributed by: Aiswarya Productions
- Release date: 25 October 1999
- Country: India
- Language: Malayalam

Crime File is a 1999 Indian Malayalam-language action crime thriller film by K. Madhu starring Suresh Gopi, Siddique and Sangita Madhavan Nair. The film is loosely based on the 1992 murder of Sister Abhaya in Kerala.

== Plot ==
Sister Amala, a nun, is found dead in the well of the convent where she was staying. The police discover that she was murdered. Idamattom Palackal Easo Panickar and his team find out the truth behind Sr. Amala's murder. The suspects include Fr. Clement Kaliyar and the local legislator Monayi, and a hitman – Cardinal Carlos.

Things get worse when Fr. Kaliyar and one of the police officers, Ezhuthachan, are killed. Then, Easow Panickar arrests, the collector Paul Varghese, with the support of the Chief Minister. On torturing and questioning him, he arrests the MLA Monayi. Later, the hitman Cardinal Carlos is taken into custody too.

== Cast ==
- Suresh Gopi as DIG Idamattom Palackal Easow Panicker IPS, SPG Joint Director
- Siddique as SSP Anwar Ravuther IPS, Kottayam District Police Chief
- Vijayaraghavan as Father Clement Kaliyar
- Rajan P. Dev as Opposition Leader Mamala Mamachan
- Sangita as Adv. Sister Amala
- Janardhanan as Kaliyar Pathrose Vaidyan
- Santhosh as SI Karthav
- Kalabhavan Mani as CI Ezhuthachan
- Cochin Haneefa as SI Jamal
- Rizabawa as Minister Thomas
- Meghanathan as Stephen
- N. F. Varghese as IG James George IPS
- Vijayakumar as MLA Monayi
- Kundara Johny as Pappy
- Jagannatha Varma as Bishop Punnassery
- Subair as Collector Paul Varghese Punnasserry IAS (Kundan Paul)
- K. B. Ganesh Kumar as Raju Namasivayam
- Spadikam George as Cardinal Carlos
- Chandini Shaju as Sister Vimala
- Mohan Jose as the Rector
- Ravi Menon as a Priest
- Ashokan as Simon
- Babu Namboothiri as Chief Minister Sathyanath
- M. S. Thripunithura as Namasivayam Swami
- Priyanka Anoop as Deenamma
- Zeenath as Mother Superior
- Reena as Amala's mother
- Narayanankutty as Chacko, Vehicle Broker
- Suma Jayaram as 'Stay' Madhavi
- Santhakumari as Sister Fisto
