= Madhuranombarakattu =

- Directed by: Kamal
- Written by: Raghunath Paleri
- Produced by: P. Nandakumar
- Starring: Biju Menon; Samyuktha Varma
- Cinematography: P. Sukumar
- Edited by: K. Rajagopal
- Music by: Vidyasagar
- Production company: Jyothi Films
- Distributed by: Sagariga Release
- Release date: 7 September 2000
- Country: India
- Language: Malayalam

Madhuranombarakattu (transl. Sweet-melancholic wind) is a 2000 Indian Malayalam-language drama film directed by Kamal and written by Raghunath Paleri, starring Biju Menon and Samyuktha Varma. The music was composed by Vidyasagar. The film won the Kerala State Film Award for Second Best Film.

== Plot ==
Vishnu is a government school teacher traveling with his children, Unni and Maya, after getting a transfer from his hometown. The bus meets with an accident, and Unni dies at the spot. Vishnu's wife, Priyamvada, is jailed after committing a murder. She kills someone who was molesting Vishnu's sister, Sreekutty.

Vishnu hides the death news of Unni from Priya and further tells the villagers that his wife has been admitted to the hospital following the accident. In the new place, Vishnu, along with his friend Shekharan, the Headmaster, and others, catch Kaatumaakan, who, with his friends, steals and kills hens and makes the school untidy, and hand him over to the police. In the jail, Kaatumakan learns of Priyamvada, Vishnu's wife, and plans vengeance.

After some days, Priyamvada is released from jail. They hope for a better life. However, Kaatumakan returns and tortures the villagers. On a windy day, Maya leaves with the neighbours in a horse cart. Priya wanders in search of Maya and gets noticed by Kaatumakan. He tries to hurt Priya, but the wind makes the school building collapse, and it falls on Kaatumakan, killing him. Vishnu finds a frightened Priya in the corner of the school and hugs her. He, along with other villagers, shares the happy news of the death of Kaatumaakan.

== Cast ==
- Biju Menon as Vishnu
- Samyuktha Varma as Priyamvadha
- Master Ashwin Thampi as Unni
- Baby Manjima as Maya
- Sreenivasan as Sekharan
- Oduvil Unnikrishnan as Head Master
- Kavya Madhavan as Sunaina
- Sarath Das as Iqbal
- Nedumudi Venu as Bhagavathar
- Mala Aravindan as Abdulla
- Vimal Raj as Kattumakkan
- Augustine as Jail Warden
- Thalaivasal Vijay as Kalki Parameswar
- T. P. Madhavan
- K. P. A. C. Lalitha as Mullathatha
- Sindhu Shyam as Seetha
- Megha as Sreekutty
- Master Vignesh as Hilal

== Soundtrack ==
The film's soundtrack contains 6 songs, all composed by Vidyasagar and Lyrics by Yusuf Ali Kecheri.

#	Title	Singer(s)
1	"Dhwadasiyil"	K. J. Yesudas, Sujatha Mohan
2	"Munthirichelulla"	Biju Narayanan, Sujatha Mohan
3	"Kadha Paranjurangiya"	K. S. Chitra
4	"Kadha Paranjurangiya"	K. J. Yesudas
5	"Prabhathathile"	K. J. Yesudas, K. S. Chitra
6	"Sruthiyamma"	K. J. Yesudas, K. S. Chitra
7	"Sruthiyamma"	K. J. Yesudas, K. S. Chitra, Raveendran Master

== Awards ==
- Kerala State Film Award for Second Best Film
- Kerala State Film Award for Best Actress - Samyuktha Varma
- Kerala State Film Award for Best Child Artist - Master Ashwin Thampi, and Baby Manjima
