= Koottukudumbam =

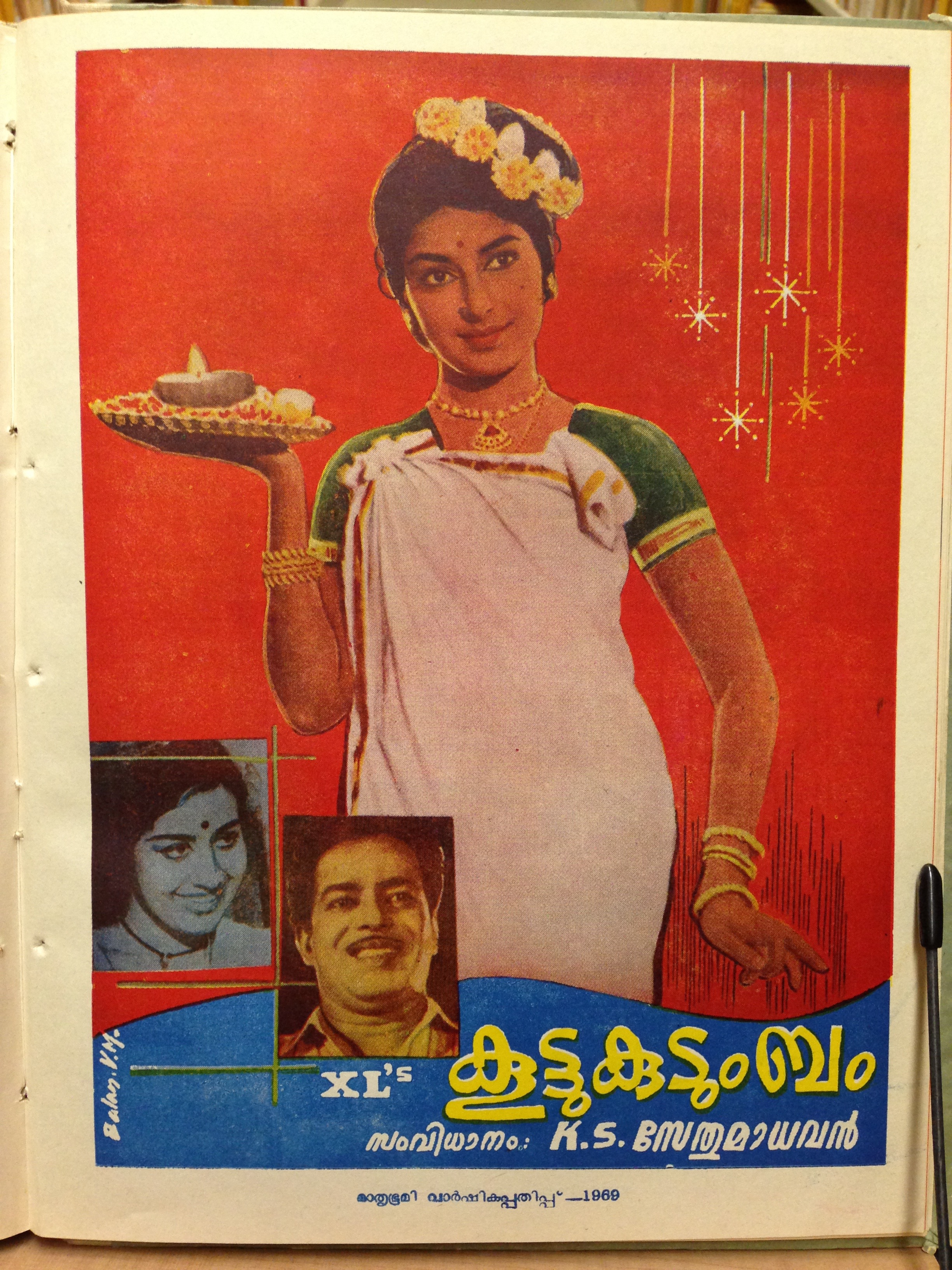
- Poster
- Directed by: K. S. Sethumadhavan
- Written by: Thoppil Bhasi
- Produced by: Kunchacko
- Starring: Sathyan; Prem Nazir; Sheela; Sharada
- Cinematography: P. Dathu
- Edited by: T. R. Sreenivasalu
- Music by: G. Devarajan
- Production company: Excel Productions
- Release date: 28 November 1969
- Country: India
- Language: Malayalam

Koottukudumbam (lit. 'Joint Family') is a 1969 Indian Malayalam-language film directed by K. S. Sethumadhavan. The film stars Sathyan, Prem Nazir, Sheela and Sharada. It was released on 28 November 1969.

== Cast ==
- Sathyan as Appukkuttan
- Prem Nazir as Radhakrishna Kurup
- Sheela as Thankamma
- Sharada as Shyamala
- KPAC Lalitha as Saraswathi
- Adoor Bhasi as Kollam Raghavan
- Manavalan Joseph as Soman
- Adoor Bhavani as Karthyayinippilla
- Adoor Pankajam as Saraswathi's Sister-in-law
- Alummoodan as Unnithan
- Kottarakkara Sreedharan Nair as Ilanjikkal Rama Kurup
- N. Govindankutty as Velayudhan Pillai
- S. J. Dev
- S. P. Pillai as Thankamma's Father
- Ushakumari as Radhika
- KPAC Khan as Govindan Nair

== Soundtrack ==
The music was composed by G. Devarajan and the lyrics were written by Vayalar Ramavarma.

Song	Singers
"Indraneela Yavanika Njorinju"	K. J. Yesudas
"Melemaanathe"	B. Vasantha
"Parashuraaman Mazhuverinju"	P. Susheela, Chorus
"Swapnasanchaarini"	P. Susheela, B. Vasantha
"Thankabhasmakkuriyitta"	K. J. Yesudas
