= Swayamvara Panthal =

2000 film by Hari Kumar

- Movie Poster
- Directed by: Hari Kumar
- Written by: Sreenivasan
- Produced by: Sukumaran Sharjah
- Starring: Jayaram; Samyuktha Varma
- Cinematography: Sunny Joseph
- Edited by: G. Murali
- Music by: Johnson
- Production company: Divya Films
- Release date: 10 September 2000
- Country: India
- Language: Malayalam

Swayamvara Panthal (transl. Wedding Pandal) is a 2000 Indian Malayalam-language drama film directed by Hari Kumar and written by Sreenivasan. It stars Jayaram and Samyuktha Varma. The music was composed by Johnson.

== Plot ==
Deepu is the pet and indispensable brother of his five sisters. They need him to take their children for an outing to replace gas cylinders and buy cosmetics. Deepu, on his part, is only too glad to be of help and thus has a special place in their hearts. As he comes of age, his sisters start searching for a suitable girl, and after a great deal of hunting, the unanimous choice is Priya. Deepu too likes her, and the marriage is conducted much ceremoniously. But soon after, some shocking revelations dawn upon him, and that too while he's on his honeymoon. Priya's strange behaviour baffles him, and the entire family is convinced that she is mentally unstable. Even though his family persuades him to leave her and secure another peaceful life, Deepu chooses to treat her in a secluded mental hospital with an amiable atmosphere. There, he meets a doctor who gives freedom to patients and a whole lot of characters who are at once humorous and emotional. At the end, Priya gets cured, but to everyone's shock, she seems to have forgotten Deepu and all about her marriage and yearns to meet her old lover. The movie ends happily with Priya accepting Deepu after realising the hardships he faced for her sake.

== Cast ==
Main cast

- Jayaram as Deepu/Deepak
- Samyuktha Varma as Priya Radhakrishnan
- Sreenivasan as James
- Innocent as Shankarbhanu/Thankappan Chingavanam
- Mammukoya as Chandran
- Lalu Alex as Doctor Santhosh
- Maniyanpilla Raju as S.I Vijayan
- Kunchan as Kareem
- V. K. Sreeraman as Balan
- Sudheesh as Rameshan
- Janardhanan as Radhakrishnan
- Ambika as Latha Suresh
- KPAC Lalitha
- Bindu Panicker as Vasanthy Vijayan
- Manju Pillai as Seema Nanthagopal
- Ponnamma Babu
- Kannur Sreelatha as Malathy
- Sarathchandra Babu

== Soundtrack ==
Swayamvara Panthal

Soundtrack album by Johnson
- Released: January 2000
- Genre: Film soundtrack
- Length: 28:35
- Language: Malayalam

Johnson chronology
Veendum Chila Veettukaryangal (1999)	Swayamvara Panthal (2000)	Susanna (2000)

The music was composed by Johnson and the lyrics were written by O. N. V. Kurup and Gireesh Puthenchery.

Track listing
No.	Title	Lyrics	Music	Singer(s)	Length
1.	"Thannampadee"	O. N. V. Kurup	Johnson	K. J. Yesudas	3:51
2.	"Kavililoromana"	O. N. V. Kurup	Johnson	K. J. Yesudas	4:33
3.	"Aanandahemanda"	O. N. V. Kurup	Johnson	K. S. Chithra	3:51
4.	"Thannampadee"	O. N. V. Kurup	Johnson	K. S. Chithra	3:49
5.	"Aanandahemanda"	O. N. V. Kurup	Johnson	P. Jayachandran	3:53
6.	"Manjil Meyanam"	Gireesh Puthenchery	Johnson	K. S. Chithra, Unni Menon, Chorus	4:23
7.	"Kanninila"	Gireesh Puthenchery	Johnson	G. Venugopal	4:15
Total length:					28:35

== Awards ==
- Kerala State Film Award for Best Actress – Samyuktha Varma
- Kerala State Film Award for Second Best Actor - Jayaram
