= Nedumpuram Palace =

Royal building in Kerala, India

Nedumpuram Palace is situated in Tiruvalla (9°23′06″N 76°34′30″E / 9.385, 76.575), Pathanamthitta District, Kerala, India. The palace belongs to a branch of the Kulasekhara dynasty that ruled the principality of Udayamangalam in Northern Kerala. The family belongs originally to the Valluvanad royal line of ascension who presided over the Mamankam festival. During the southern campaign of Tippu Sultan, the family relocated to the south of Kerala and took shelter under the patronage of the King of Travancore. The family divided into two branches establishing principalities within Travancore in Mariapalli and Tiruvalla. Tiruvalla was ruled by Raja Raja Varma for a period of 3 years. His only son Damodaran Thampi left the kingdom to serve at Sree Vallabha Temple and was known as His Holiness Damodaran Thampi. He was fondly called as Damodaran Adhikari. He was known for his charitable contributions. The current palace stands at the location of an earlier palace that belonged to the erstwhile Raja of Tiruvalla.

== Architecture ==
The palace is constructed in the traditional complex pathinarukettu structure (lit. 16 halls) which divided the structure into four blocks of four halls each with indoor open courtyards connected to each other. The structure is supported by teak beams and false ceilings. At present the building is in disrepair. It is built in the kovilakam style. A single four-block block of this architecture is called Nālukettu and is generally constructed as a single dwelling of many joint families.

Foe each block of 'Nalukettu', barring the foundation and floor is made of carved and slotted wood and has a close resemblance to East Asian gabled and thatched structures. In later years, tiles replaced the coconut fronds. The enclosed courtyard is sunk and is used for ritual ablutions and to grow plants for ritual use. The courtyard is open and gives direct access to the rooms. The building is divided into two blocks by an inner temple where the family deity is kept and worshipped. The large teak doors on the outer verandahs are reserved for various ritual uses and are seldom opened. The outer verandahs on both the western and eastern verandahs are left open, the northern and southern verandahs are enclosed or semi-enclosed.

The main palace is surrounded by out buildings of later vintage. Of these, Puttan Kottaram (New Palace) houses a temple, Tekke Kottaram (Northern Palace, now demolished) housed one branch of the family while Vadakke Kottaram (Southern Palace) is a structure separated from the main compound by a river that housed non-members connected by marriage. Another branch of this palace, kezhakke nedumpurathu Kottaram, renamed as Thukalassery kottaram for the last 100years headed by Bhageerathi Thampuratty and her brother U Rama Varma Thampuran. This palace has been maintained as such without any modern modifications thus maintaining the aesthetic of the magnificent royal structure.

== Genesis and mythology ==
Based on Keralolpathi, the last Perumal, Ramavarma Kulasekhara Perumal, of the Second Chera Kingdom (Kulasekhara Samrajyam, 800–1102), with its capital at Mahodayapuram, divided his kingdom to his relatives and Nair chiefs. There is some evidence to support this claim. The family came into being as one of branches of this division. The earliest recorded existence of the original Valluvanad lineage extends to the 12th century even through earliest known member of the palace to locate to Tiruvalla lived in the 17th century. As a branch of the principality of Mavelikkara who came and settled there during Tipu's "pattayottam" time, the family is also directly related to Raja Ravi Varma. When the royal family of Travencore did not have an heir in the 19th century, the dynasty was restarted by adoption from Mavelikkara. Thus the family is related both by blood and marriage to the royal families of Travancore and by marriage to the royal family of Cochin. The family is matrilineal with the oldest male relative through the mother heads the household as the "Valia Raja" and the oldest female gaining the title of "Amma Raja".

The fortunes of the family went into decline in the 19th century as result of the end of feudalism and through the slow decline of marumakkathayam. In the last 19th century, the Valia Raja siphoned off the funds of the palace to fund the lifestyle of his birth family.

== Nomenclature ==
All the male Thampurans were named according to the following methodology.

- Eldest Son To A Mother Rama Varma
- Second Son Kerala Varma
- Third Son Ravi Varma
- Fourth Son Goda Varma

All names are prefixed with their day of birth and suffixed with Varma Raja.

For female Thampurattis, a rigid nomenclature was not in place.

== Famous members ==
- Samyuktha Varma - Actress
- Urmila Unni - Painter and Actress
- B. G. Varma - Artist

== See also ==
- Pathanamthitta
- Tiruvalla
- Travancore
- Samyuktha Varma
