= Innathe Program =

- Directed by: P. G. Vishwambharan
- Written by: Kaloor Dennis
- Screenplay by: Kaloor Dennis
- Produced by: Changanassery Basheer
- Starring: Mukesh; Siddique; Radha; A. C. Zainuddin; Philomina
- Music by: Johnson
- Production company: Simple Productions
- Distributed by: Simple Productions
- Release date: 1991
- Country: India
- Language: Malayalam

Innathe Program is a 1991 Indian Malayalam film, directed by P. G. Vishwambharan and produced by Changanassery Basheer. The film stars Mukesh, Siddique, Radha (in her final Malayalam film to date), A. C. Zainuddin and Philomina in the lead roles. The film has musical score by Johnson.

== Plot ==
Unnikrishan, Rajendran and Salim are friends and working in the same office. They live in a rented house. Indumathi joins their office as accountant. Unnikrishan and Indumathi falls in love an get married, without their family knowing. Unnikrishan is primarily afraid of his father and how they overcome the situation is the rest of the story.

== Cast ==
- Mukesh as Unnikrishnan Nair
- Siddique as Rajendran
- Radha as Indumathi
- A. C. Zainuddin as Salim
- Mammukoya as Moosa
- Philomina as Bhargavikutty Amma
- Baiju as Dasappan
- Kalpana as Minikutty
- Oduvil Unnikrishnan as Unni's Father
- Thodupuzha Vasanthi as Unni's Mother
- M. S. Thripunithura as Indu's Father
- K.P.A.C. Lalitha as Bhageerathi
- Thrissur Elsy as Manager
- Rajan Mannarakkayam as Peon at Unni's office
- Suvarna Mathew as Unni's neighbour

== Soundtrack ==
The music was composed by Johnson and the lyrics were written by Bichu Thirumala.

No.	Song	Singers	Lyrics	Length (m:ss)
1	"Aattavum Paattum"	M. G. Sreekumar	Bichu Thirumala	
2	"Chiriyeriya Praayam"	M. G. Sreekumar	Bichu Thirumala	
