= Garshom =

- Directed by: P. T. Kunju Muhammed
- Written by: P. T. Kunju Muhammed
- Produced by: P. Jayapala Menon
- Starring: Murali; Urvashi; Madhu; Siddique
- Cinematography: Sunny Joseph
- Edited by: Venugopal
- Music by: Ramesh Narayan
- Production company: Janasakthi Films
- Distributed by: Janasakthi Films
- Release date: 15 October 1999
- Country: India
- Language: Malayalam

Garshom is a 1999 Indian Malayalam-language film, directed by P. T. Kunju Muhammed. The film stars Murali, Urvashi, Madhu and Siddique in the lead roles. The film has musical score by Ramesh Narayan. It was the debut film of noted lyricist Rafeeq Ahammed. It won the John Abraham Award for Best Malayalam Film in 1998.

== Plot ==
Nasseruddin is a straightforward man who has returned to India after spending 12 years doing hard labour in Arab states in the Persian Gulf. He hasn't been able to save much for his wife, mother and two children. However, he has a very positive, calm mindset and tries to start a business. His relatives are not keen to help him, although they are rich. A financial divide clearly appears between his family and their relatives, leading to stressful situations for his children, wife and himself.

Being a very truthful and straightforward person, he loses his business. He is also arrested by the police for failure to repay a bank loan. After being bailed out, depressed and dejected, he returns home where his wife consoles him. His mother suggests that he head back to the Gulf to look for work, which he does.

== Cast ==
- Murali as Nasseruddin
- Urvashi as Noorja
- Madhu as Madhavankutty Master
- Siddique as Hameed
- Baby Hency
- Master Sidharth Sreekumar
- Zeenath as Jameela
- Vani Vishwanath as Sumithra
- Sadiq as Aravindan
- Devan as Hakkim
- Mamukkoya as Abdul Rahman
- Nedumudi Venu as Subair
- Unnikrishnan Namboothiri as Bappu Haji
- V. K. Sreeraman as K. C. Haji
- Valsala Menon as Aishu
- Kuthiravattom Pappu as Damodaran
- Moideen Koya as Salim

== Soundtrack ==
The music was composed by Ramesh Narayan and the lyrics were written by Rafeeq Ahamed.

No.	Song	Singers	Lyrics	Length (m:ss)
1	"Ethu Kaalaraathrikalkkum"	Hariharan	Rafeeq Ahamed	
2	"Parayaan Maranna"	Hariharan	Rafeeq Ahamed	
3	"Parayaan Maranna" [F]	K. S. Chithra	Rafeeq Ahamed	
