= Life Is Beautiful (2000 film) =

2000 film directed by Fazil

- Digital soundtrack cover
- Directed by: Fazil
- Written by: Fazil
- Produced by: Fazil
- Starring: Mohanlal; Samyuktha Varma; Geetu Mohandas
- Cinematography: Anandakuttan
- Edited by: T. R. Sekhar; K. R. Gowri Shankar
- Music by: Ouseppachan
- Production company: Ammu Movies
- Distributed by: Ammu Movies Release
- Release date: 14 April 2000
- Country: India
- Language: Malayalam

Life Is Beautiful is a 2000 Indian Malayalam-language drama film written, directed and produced by Fazil. The film stars Mohanlal and Samyuktha Varma and Geetu Mohandas in lead roles, and features a soundtrack composed by Ouseppachan. The film was released on 14 April 2000, and is partly a remake of the 1989 classic Dead Poets Society, but title was inspired by the 1997 Italian film of the same title Life is Beautiful. It's also marked Geethu Mohandas's first Malayalam film as a leading actress, having previously acted as a child artist.

== Plot ==
Vinayachandran and Sindhu are a happily married couple who enjoy romancing. Vinayachandran joins a public school as a Plus Two teacher. In the strict disciplined school, unlike other teachers, Vinayachandran is friendly and conducts enjoyable classes. The students get easily carried away by his amiable nature.

One day, Sindhu's sister Bala visits them and asks Sindhu's permission to go to the United States for her higher studies, which Sindhu disapproves of reluctantly. Later, Sindhu leaves for a professional tour, leaving Vinayachandran and Bala alone. Meanwhile, Bala tries to get intimate with Vinayachandran, which annoys him, and he asks her why she is behaving so childishly. She says that Sindhu is the only one she has in this world, but now that she has married Vinayachandran, she feels lonely. Vinayachandran understands her state of mind and consoles her by asking her to behave like his sister. Much to Vinayachandran's dismay, Bala's behaviour gets stranger day by day.

Vinayachandran loses his job because of his non-academic style of teaching. Sindhu returns after her trip, and Bala confesses that she tried to get intimate with Vinayachandran and intended to replace Sindhu. Sindhu is devastated by this revelation and stops talking to Vinayachandran. Vinayachandran gets his job back as his students stand up for him and ask the authorities not to fire him. Sindhu agrees to Bala's US plans. Vinayachandran joins them at the railway station, and together the couple bids goodbye to Bala. Vinayachandran tells Sindhu that Bala's infatuation was taken as childish behaviour by him, and that it shouldn't affect their life. They reconcile.

The film ends with Sindhu repeating Vinayachandran's words to him that whatever happens in LIFE, it IS always BEAUTIFUL.

== Cast ==
- Mohanlal as Vinayachandran
- Samyuktha Varma as Sindhu, Vinayachandran's wife
- Geetu Mohandas as Bala, Sindhu's younger sister
- Arun as Sooraj Kishore
- Innocent as Nambiar
- K. P. A. C. Lalitha as Sosamma
- Nedumudi Venu as Omanakuttan, the Principal
- Reena
- Rizabawa as Sindhu's Manager
- Sai Kumar as Kishore Menon, Suraj's father
- Saritha as Vice Principal
- Mithun Ramesh as Rajan Panicker

== Soundtrack ==
Life Is Beautiful

Soundtrack album by Ouseppachan
- Released: 1 January 2000
- Genre: Popular music
- Length: 33:08
- Language: Malayalam
- Labels: JS Audio; T-Series
- Producer: Fazil

Ouseppachan chronology
| Punaradhivasam (2000) | Life Is Beautiful (2000) | Darling Darling (2000) |

The film features an eight-song soundtrack composed by Ouseppachan, all songs' lyrics were written by Kaithapram Damodaran Namboothiri. The music label T-Series released the soundtrack on 1 January 2012.

All lyrics are written by Kaithapram Damodaran Namboothiri; all music is composed by Ouseppachan.

| No. | Title | Artist(s) | Length |
|---|---|---|---|
| 1. | "Vaalittezhuthiya" | K. J. Yesudas | 04:10 |
| 2. | "Iniyenthunalkanam" | K. J. Yesudas, Sujatha Mohan | 04:10 |
| 3. | "Kelinilavoru Palazhi" | Vijay Yesudas, Chorus | 04:09 |
| 4. | "Vaalittezhuthiya (Sad)" | K. J. Yesudas | 03:19 |
| 5. | "Aaradhana" | M. G. Sreekumar, Deepankuran, Deenanath | 04:08 |
| 6. | "Ho Ho Ho Ho" (Instrumental) | N/A | 04:04 |
| 7. | "Kelinilaavoru Palazhi" | K. J. Yesudas, Vijay Yesudas | 05:04 |
| 8. | "Ohohohoho Rithupallaviyil" | M. G. Sreekumar | 04:04 |
| Total length: | | | 33:08 |

== Production ==
The film marked the return of Geetu Mohandas, it was her first adult role after appearing in films as a child artist early in her life.

== Legacy ==
On 5 September 2015 on the occasion of Teachers' Day in India, International Business Times included Mohanlal's Vinayachandran in their compilation of seven "Best Teachers in Malayalam Films That You Will Never Forget".
