= Pradeep Chokli =

Indian film director

- Born: Chokli, Kannur, Kerala
- Occupation(s): Film director Art director Film poster designer
- Years active: 1980–present

Pradeep Chokli is an Indian film director who works in Malayalam language films. He made his directorial debut with Pradakshinam, a Manoj K. Jayan starrer in 1994. Pradeep is often mentioned about the critically acclaimed film English Medium starring Sreenivasan and Mukesh.

Pradeep has also worked as an art director for more than 30 films starting from P.A. Backer's Charam and has also worked as a Film poster designer as well.

== Filmography ==
Year	Film	Notes	Source
2017	Chippy		
2014	Pedithondan		
2003	Melvilasam Sariyanu		
2001	Mazhamegha Pravukal		
1999	English Medium		
1994	Pradakshinam		
1987	Varshangal Poyathariyathe	Art Director	
1983	Charam	Art Director	
