= Ottapalam Pappan =

Malayalam film actor (1945-2013)

- Born: N. P. Padmanabhan; 15 June 1945; Ottapalam
- Died: 25 July 2013 (aged 68)
- Occupation: Film actor
- Years active: 1991 - 2006
- Spouse: Pankajam P. Menon
- Children: Dheeraj; Sarath
- Parent(s): Vaappala Narayana Menon; Naavally Pandarakulathil Parukkuttyamma

Ottapalam Pappan (15 June 1945 - 25 July 2013) was an Indian theatre, television and film actor in Malayalam movies during the 1990s and 2000s. Pappan started as a theatre artist and later debuted in film with the 1991 movie Valsalyam. He acted in around 80 movies. His popular movies are Golanthara Vartha, Pingami, Oru Maravathoor Kanavu and Sallapam. Pappan was active in the theater scene from 1970 to 1990. He had acted in many telefilms and won best supporting actor television award from State Government in 2009 for the telefilm Irul meghangalkkum Soorya reshmikalkkum madhye, received from Minister M. A. Baby.

== Biography ==
He was born to Vaappala Narayana Menon and Naavally Pandarakulathil Parukkutty Amma on 15 June 1945 at Ottapalam. He has 3 sisters and 2 brothers. He completed his primary education from Ananganady school, Ottappalam. After school he went to Bangalore and joined the Indian Army. After 8 years of army life, he joined Drama troupes Kollam Tuena, Drisya Kalanjali and Udaya Kala National Theatres. He has acted in more than 200 dramas. He has won the Best Actor Award for his performance in Bhugolam (drama). In 1993, he debuted through the Malayalam movie Vatsalyam, directed by Cochin Haneefa and written by Lohithadas. He died at his house at Pampadi, Thiruvilwamala, on 25 July 2013. He was 68 years old. He is survived by his wife, Pankajam P. Menon and two sons, Dheeraj and Sarath. He was the chief coordinator of a trust called Janananma Sevana Sabha. His last film was Ayudham.

== Partial filmography ==
- Vaalsalyam (1993)
- Maya Mayooram (1993) as Nanu Nair
- Golanthara Vartha (1993) as Postman M.K. Surendran
- Chakoram (1994)
- Pingaami (1994)
- Sallapam (1996)
- Mr Clean (1996)
- Oru Maravathoor Kanavu (1998) as Priest
- Chinthavishthaya Shyamala (1998)
- English Medium (1999)
- Angane Oru Avadhikkaalathu (1999)
- Chandranudikkunna Dikhil (1999)
- Manivarnathooval (2002) as Chandy
- Manassinakkare (2003)
- Parinaamam (2004)
- Natturajavu (2004) as Chacko
- Rappakal (2005) as milkman
- Naran (2005) as Kunjambu
- Nomparam (2005)
- Raashtram (2006)
- Out of Syllabus (2006)
- Jayam (2006)
- Anchil Oral Arjunan (2007)
- TD Dasan Std VI B (2010)

== Television ==
- Desadanapakshi
- Ormakalude Virunnu
- Kadha Kadha Karanam
- Swami Ayyappan
- Nakshatrangalkku Thaazhe
