= Samyuktha Varma =

Indian actress (born 1979)

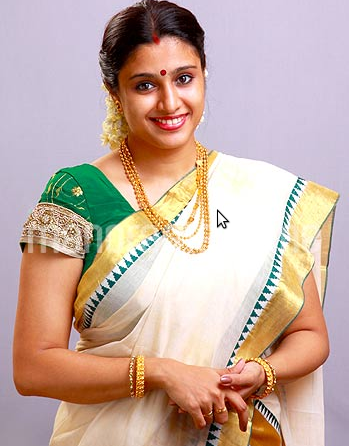
- Samyuktha during a magazine shoot
- Born: 28 November 1979 (age 46); Thiruvalla,Kerala
- Occupation: Actress
- Years active: 1999–2002
- Spouse: Biju Menon (m. 2002)
- Children: 1
- Relatives: Urmila Unni (Aunt); Utthara Unni (Cousin)
- Awards: Kerala State Film Award for Best Actress; Filmfare Award for Best Actress

Samyuktha Varma (born 28 November 1979) is a former Indian actress who was active in Malayalam films from 1999 to 2002. She made her debut in 1999 as the female lead in the movie Veendum Chila Veettukaryangal for which she won her first Kerala State Film Award for Best Actress, since then she has acted in a total of 18 films. Varma has won two Kerala State Film Awards for Best Actress and two Filmfare Award for Best Actress. She is married to Malayalam actor Biju Menon since 2002.

== Early life ==
Samyuktha Varma was born at Thiruvalla in Kerala on 28 November 1979 to Ravi Varma and Uma Varma. She hails from a royal background. She belongs to the Nedumpuram Palace royal clan in Thiruvalla, Kerala. She did her schooling at N.S.S. Higher Secondary School in Thrissur. While she was studying at Sree Kerala Varma College, Thrissur, she got an offer to do the female lead role in the Malayalam film Veendum Chila Veettukaryangal.

== Film career ==
Her debut was in Veendum Chila Veettukaryangal in 1999, followed by Vazhunnor and Chandranudikkunna Dikkil in 2000.

In 2000 she acted in Nadanpennum Naattupramaaniyum directed by Rajasenan, Fazil's production Life is Beautiful, Angene Oru Avadhikkalathu directed by Mohan, Mazha directed by Lenin Rajendran based on a short story by Madhavikutty followed by Madhuranombarakaattu and Swayamvara Panthal.

At the end of 2002, she was cast in Rafi-Mecartin's Thenkasi Pattanam and Rajasenan's Megasandesam.

She was also approached to play the female lead in Baba opposite Rajinikanth, but she declined as she did not wish to work post marriage.

== Personal life ==
She married Biju Menon on 23 November 2002. The couple have a son, Daksh Dharmik, born 14 September 2006.

== Awards and honours ==
Year	Award	Award category	Work	Result	Reference
1999	Kerala State Film Awards	Kerala State Film Award for Best Actress	Veendum Chila Veettukaryangal	Won	
1999	Filmfare Awards South	Filmfare Award for Best Actress	Veendum Chila Veettukaryangal	Nominated	
1999	Asianet Film Awards	Asianet Award for Best Female New Face of the Year	Chandranudikkunna Dikkil; Veendum Chila Veettukaryangal	Won	
2000	Kerala State Film Awards	Kerala State Film Award for Best Actress	Madhuranombarakattu; Mazha; Swayamvara Panthal	Won	
2000	Filmfare Awards South	Filmfare Award for Best Actress	Mazha	Won	
2000	Filmfare Awards South	Filmfare Award for Best Actress	Life Is Beautiful	Nominated	
2000	Asianet Film Awards	Asianet Best Actress Award	Mazha; Madhuranombarakattu	Won	
2000	Asianet Film Awards	Best Star Pair Award	Meghamalhar (shared with Biju Menon)	Won	
2001	Filmfare Awards South	Filmfare Award for Best Actress	Meghamalhar	Won	

== Filmography ==
Year	Film	Role	Notes
1999	Veendum Chila Veettukaryangal	Bhavana	Debut film
1999	Vazhunnor	Rani	
1999	Chandranudikkunna Dikhil	Hema	
1999	Angene Oru Avadhikkalathu	Nirmala	
2000	Swayamvara Panthal	Priyamvada	
2000	Thenkasipattanam	Meenakshi	
2000	Nadanpennum Naattupramaaniyum	Gayathri	
2000	Mazha	Bhadra (Subhadra)	
2000	Madhuranombarakattu	Priyamvada	
2000	Life Is Beautiful	Sindhu	
2001	Saivar Thirumeni	Annie	
2001	Megasandesam	Anjali Varma	
2001	Narendran Makan Jayakanthan Vaka	Vinodini	
2001	Nariman	Sethulakshmi	
2001	One Man Show	Radhika Menon	
2001	Meghamalhar	Nandita Menon	
2002	Thenkasi Pattanam	Meenakshi	Tamil film
2002	Kuberan	Pooja	
