= Malavika =

Malavika is an Indian female given name. Notable people with the name include:

== Mononym ==
- Malavika, the titular character in Kālidāsa's ancient Indian play Malavika Agnimitra
- Malavika (actress), Indian film actress
- Malavika (singer), Tollywood playback singer and TV anchor

== Given name ==
- Malavika Avinash, Indian film actress
- Maalavika Manoj, Indian independent musician and songwriter
- Malavika Menon, Indian film actress in Malayalam and Tamil films
- Malavika Mohanan, Indian film actress in Malayalam and Tamil films
- Malavika Nair (Malayalam actress) (21st century), Indian actress in Malayalam films
- Malavika Shivpuri, Indian actress and dubbing artist
- Malavika Wales, Malayalam film actress
- Malavika Krishnadas, Malayalam television actress, host and dancer

== See also ==
- Malvika Nair (born 1998), Indian actress in Tamil, Telugu and Malayalam films
- Malvika Sharma, Indian film actress in Telugu and Tamil films
