= Veendum Chila Veettukaryangal =

- Poster
- Directed by: Sathyan Anthikad
- Written by: A. K. Lohithadas
- Produced by: P. V. Gangadharan
- Starring: Jayaram; Thilakan; Samyuktha Varma; K.P.A.C. Lalitha; Siddique
- Cinematography: Vipin Mohan
- Edited by: K. Rajagopal
- Music by: Johnson
- Production company: Gruhalakshmi Productions
- Distributed by: Kalpaka Films
- Release date: 6 May 1999
- Running time: 160 minutes
- Country: India
- Language: Malayalam

Veendum Chila Veettukaryangal (transl. A Few Family Matters...Again) is a 1999 Indian Malayalam-language family drama film directed by Sathyan Anthikkad and written by A. K. Lohithadas. The film was produced by P. V. Gangadharan and was distributed by Kalpaka Films. Starring Jayaram, Thilakan and Samyuktha Varma. It was the debut film of Samyuktha Varma. Malayalam film director Lohithadas makes a cameo appearance. For her performance as Bhavana, Samyuktha Varma won the Kerala State Film Award for Best Actress.

== Plot ==
Thirumuttathu Kochuthoma is a member of an acting troupe. He has a wife named Mary, three sons named Johny Kutty, Paul, and Roy and two daughters named Beena and Lisy. His youngest son Roy is also a stage actor in the same troupe and an aspiring writer.

Kochuthoma and Mary have seen hard times and have managed to raise their children well. However, their youngest son Roy had an easy childhood and has become spoiled. He received his diploma in automobile engineering. He is jobless but is not trying to find a job. He is active in the church choir and a drama group. His ambition is to make it big in the film industry.

His father shares his dramatic pursuits. The two go to rehearsals together and come home late, causing Mary to worry. Paul, who is a banker, is a critic of the duo and their pursuit of stardom.

Bhavana is a young girl from a poor family. She works to support her mentally unstable mother. She goes door-to-door selling various products. Roy, who was looking for a heroine for a production, bumps into Bhavana, who is willing to take the role because she needs money. Slowly he falls in love with her. He later marries her against his father's wish and Thoma asks them to move out.

Roy and Bhavana start their married life in Bhavana's small home. Roy soon begins to feel the difficulties of life. He is too lazy to work and Bhavana starts earning for the family. They get no help from Thoma.

Roy meets movie directors and writers. One of these directors has a car breakdown. Roy helps to repair the car. The director advises him to go into vehicle repair, leading Roy to start a successful career in that field.

Meanwhile, his family goes through tough times. Paul suffers losses and his bank is closed down. Thoma loses the money he had deposited in the bank for the marriage of Lisy, his youngest daughter. He also becomes hospitalized. With Roy's help, Lisy's marriage is conducted and Roy. But when Roy relishes in his moral victory, Bhavana reveals to him that everything that happened, was actually planned beforehand by Kochuthoma. He loves Roy very much and cares as deeply for Bhavana as well. But he fears that unless Roy overcomes his laidback attitude and finds a sense of purpose, their life will be marred with problems. He orchestrated everything to teach Roy the value of hardwork and to help him understand the struggles of life. Overcome with love and admiration for his father, Roy and Bhavana return to Thirumuttathu house, where Roy finally confronts Kochuthoma, who realizes that Bhavana told Roy everything, and with a smile and appreciation for Roy's growth, accepts the couple back into the house, a family reunited.

== Cast ==
- Jayaram as Royachayan /Roy Thomas
- Thilakan as Thomas /Thomachayan
- Samyuktha Varma as Bhavana
- K.P.A.C. Lalitha as Mary / Maryppennu
- Siddique as Paul Thomas
- A. K. Lohithadas as Lohit Kumar
- Oduvil Unnikrishnan as Fr. Nedumaram
- Nedumudi Venu as Aravindan
- Mamukkoya as Kunjoonju
- Kuthiravattam Pappu as Kunjiraman Aashaan
- Santhakumari as Bhavana's Mother
- Sona Nair as Sheela Paul
- Reena as Beena Thomas
- Sreejaya Nair as Lisy Thomas
- Vishnuprakash as Dr. Jose
- Master Sanjeev as Vinu
- E. A. Rajendran as Johnnykutty
- Srihari as Adv. Chandran Nair
- Thesni Khan as Leelamma
- Ottapalam Leelamma as Theater Artist
- Jijoy Rajagopal as Theater Artist
- Meenakshi Sunil as Sofia
- Krishnakumar as Businessman Anil Kurup

== Crew ==
- Cinematography: Vipin Mohan
- Editing: K. Rajapogal
- Art: Premachandran
- Makeup: Pandyan
- Costumes: Velayudhan Keezhillam
- Advertisement: Sabu Colonia
- Stills: M. K. Mohanan
- Effects: Murukesh
- Production controller: Sethu Mannarkkad
- Associate director: Shibu

== Songs ==
All lyrics are written by Kaithapram Damodaran, Sathyan Anthikad except where noted; all music is composed by Johnson.

No.	Title	Lyrics	Artist(s)	Length
1.	"Pinnilaavin Poo Vidarnnu"		K. J. Yesudas, Sindhu Devi
2.	"Kannetha Mala Maamala Mele"		P. Jayachandran
3.	"Vishwam Kaakkunna Naadha"	Sathyan Anthikad	K. J. Yesudas, Chorus
4.	"Mounam Ente Maayaamohathil"		Sujatha Mohan
5.	"Vaakkukal Vende"		P. Jayachandran
6.	"Pinnilaavin Poo Vidarnnu"		Sujatha Mohan
7.	"Othu Pidichavar Kappal Keri"		Sujatha Mohan

== Awards ==
Kerala State Film Awards

- Best Film with Popular Appeal and Aesthetic Value
- Best Actress - Samyuktha Varma

Asianet Film Awards

- Best Film
- Best Script Writer - A. K. Lohithadas
- Best Cinematographer - Vipin Mohan

Filmfare Awards South

- Filmfare Award for Best Film – Malayalam - P. V. Gangadharan
- Nominated - Filmfare Award for Best Actress - Malayalam - Samyuktha Varma

Other Awards

- Film Critics Award for Best Script - A. K. Lohithadas
