= K. P. A. C. Lalitha =

Indian actress (1947–2022)

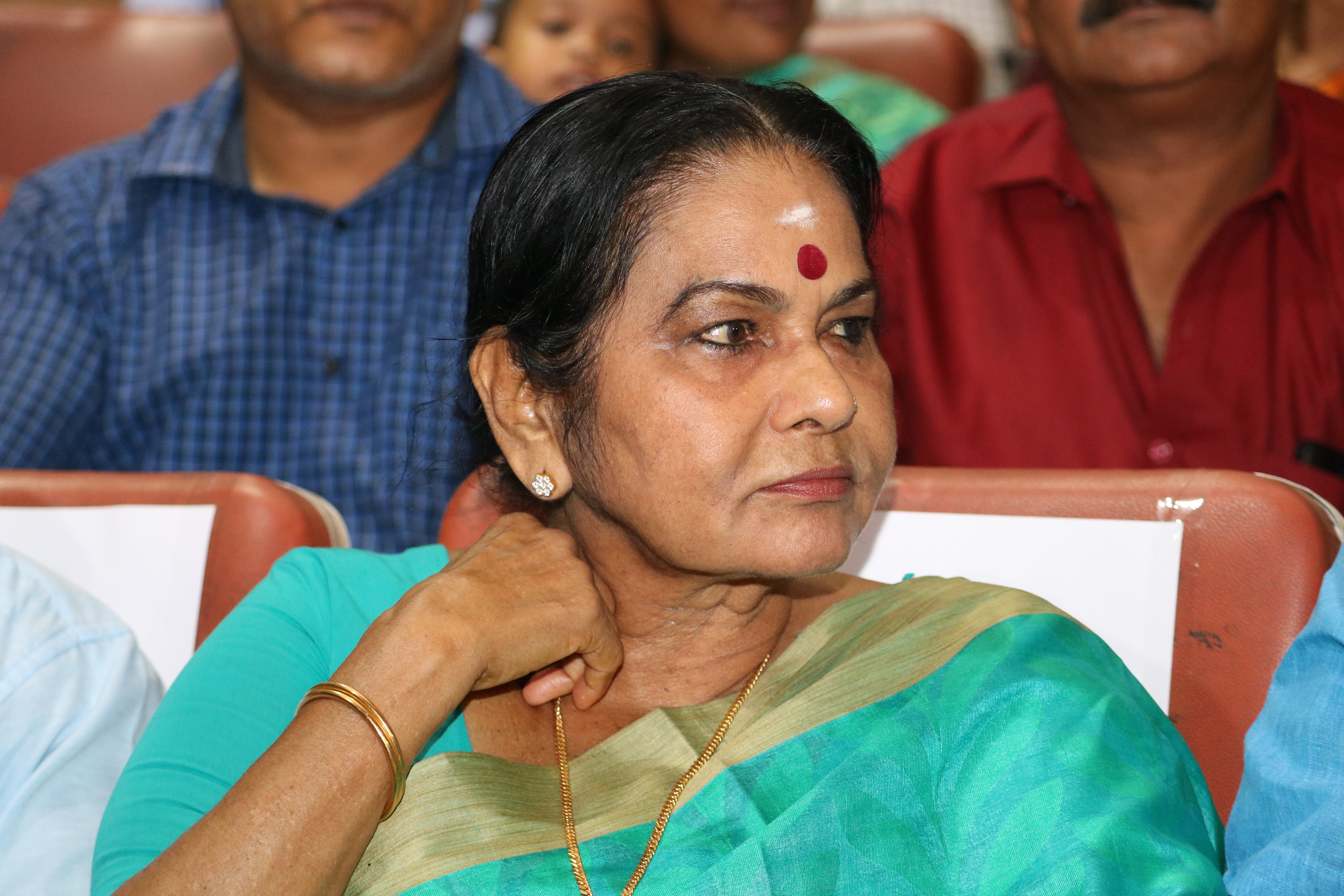
- Lalitha at Kerala Sangeetha Nataka Akademi Award night in Kollam (2019)
- Born: Maheshwari Amma; 10 March 1947; Kayamkulam, Kingdom of Travancore
- Died: 22 February 2022 (aged 74); Thrippunithura, Kochi, Kerala, India
- Occupation: Actress
- Years active: 1968–2022
- Works: Full list
- Spouse: Bharathan (m. 1978; died 1998)
- Children: 2; including Sidharth Bharathan
- Awards: National Film Awards (1990, 2000)

Maheshwari Amma, better known by her stage name K. P. A. C. Lalitha (10 March 1947 – 22 February 2022), was an Indian film and stage actress who worked primarily in the Malayalam film industry. Considered one of the greatest actresses in the history of Indian Cinema, she started her acting career with Kerala People's Arts Club, a theatre collective in Kayamkulam, Kerala. In a career spanning five decades, she starred in over 550 films.

Lalitha won two National Film Awards for Best Supporting Actress along with four Kerala State Film Awards. In 2009, she was honoured with the Filmfare Lifetime Achievement Award at the 2009 Filmfare Awards South. Lalitha latterly served as the chairperson of Kerala Sangeetha Nataka Akademi. She was married to the late Malayalam filmmaker Bharathan.

== Early life ==
Lalitha was born as Maheshwari Amma at Aranmula, in present day Pathanamthitta District, on 10 March 1947. She was born to Kadaykatharayil Veettil Ananthan Nair and Bhargavi Amma, as the eldest among five children; her four siblings were Indira, Babu, Rajan and Shyamala. She was born five years after her parents' marriage. Her father was a photographer from Kayamkulam and her mother was a housewife who was from Aranmula. She spent most of her childhood at Ramapuram near Kayamkulam.

Her family migrated to Changanassery, Kottayam for her to join dance class. In a young age itself she had very much interest in dance. She learned to dance when she was a child under the guidance of Chellappan Pillai and then under Kalamandalam Gangadharan. She started acting in plays when she was 10 years old. Her first appearance on stage was in the play Geethayude Bali. She later joined Kerala People's Arts Club (K. P. A. C.), which was a prominent leftist drama troupe in Kerala. She was given the stage name Lalitha and later, when she started acting in movies, the tag K.P.A.C. was added to her screen-name to differentiate it from another actress known as Lalitha.

== Acting career ==
Her first movie was the film adaptation of Koottukudumbam directed by K. S. Sethumadhavan. In 1978 she married Bharathan, a noted Malayalam film director. She took a break from film acting for sometime, doing only a few films.

The second era of her career started with Kattathe Kilikkoodu (1983) directed by her husband. Her pairing with Innocent was hugely popular with the audience between 1986 and 2006 with successful films like Gajakesariyogam, Apporvam Chillar, Makkal Mahatmiyam, Shubha Yatra, My Dear Muthachan, Kannanum Polisum, Arjunan Pillaiyum Anju Makkalum, Injankaddai Mathai and Sons, Pavam Pavam Rajakumaram. During this time, she did many critically acclaimed roles including those in Kattukuthira (1990), Sanmanassullavarkku Samadhanam (1986), Ponn Muttyidunna Tharavu (1988), Kottayam Kunjachan (1990), Vadakkunokkiyantram (1989), Innathe Program (1991), Dasharatham (1989), Kanalkkattu (1991),Venkalam (1993), Godfather (1991), Amaram (1991), Vietnam Colony (1993), Pavithram (1993), Manichitrathazhu (1994), Spadikam (1995), and Aniyathipraavu (1997). She won the National Film Award for Best Supporting Actress for her performance in Amaram (1991), a film directed by her husband Bharathan.

In 1998, when her husband Bharathan died, she took a break for a few months, only to come back with an acclaimed performance in Sathyan Anthikkad directed Veendum Chila Veetukaryangal (1999). K.P.A.C. Lalitha's notable roles after that were in Shantham (2000), Life Is Beautiful (2000) and Valkannadi (2002). She won her second National Film Award for Best Supporting Actress for her role in Shantham (2000), directed by Jayaraj.

K.P.A.C. Lalitha acted in over 500 films in Malayalam cinema. Apart from Malayalam, she acted in some Tamil films including Kadhalukku Mariyadhai (1997), Maniratnam's Alai Payuthey (2000) and Kaatru Veliyidai (2017). Particularly, her performance in Tamil film Kadhalukku Mariyadhai as Shalini's mother won her critical acclaim.

== Personal life and death ==
Lalitha had a daughter Sreekutty and a son Sidharth who debuted as an actor in the movie Nammal, which was directed by Kamal. After a short career in acting, he chose a career in film direction. In 2012, he made his directorial debut with Nidra, which is the remake of 1984 film with the same title written and directed by his father Bharathan. She was a member and supporter of Communist Party of India (Marxist).

She published an autobiography, titled Katha Thudarum (Story To Be Continued), which won the Cherukad Award in 2013.

Lalitha died in Thrippunithura on 22 February 2022, at the age of 74. She had been hospitalised since November 2021 due to multiple health issues, including liver ailment and diabetes. Her mortal remains were taken to her home in Wadakkancherry, and she was cremated with full state honours.

== Awards ==
National Film Awards

- 1990: Best Supporting Actress – Amaram
- 2000: Best Supporting Actress – Shantham

Kerala State Film Awards

- 1975: Second Best Actress – Neela Ponman, Onnum Lelle (1975)
- 1978: Second Best Actress – Aaravam
- 1990: Second Best Actress – Amaram
- 1991: Second Best Actress – Kadinjool Kalyanam, Godfather, Sandesam

Asianet Film Awards

- 2000: Best Supporting Actress – Shantham
- 2007: Best Supporting Actress – Thaniye, Nasrani, Aakasham
- 2011: Best Supporting Actress – Snehaveedu

Filmfare Awards South

- 2009: Filmfare Lifetime Achievement Award

Other awards

- 2007: Premji Award
- 2009: Thoppil Bhasi Prathibha Award
- 2009: Annual Malayalam Movie Award (Dubai) for Best Outstanding Performances
- 2010: Bharat Murali Award
- 2011: Bahadoor Award
- 2011: Kambisseri Karunakaran Award
- 2012: Thoppil Bhasi Prathibha Award
- 2013: MT Chandrasenan Award
- 2013: Cherukad Award for Literature for Autobiography "Katha Thudarum" (Writer)
- 2014: Kerala Sangeetha Nataka Akademi Fellowship
- 2014: Sangam Lifetime Achievement Award
- 2014:Vanithalokam Award
- 2015: Part-Ono Films- Samaadharanam-'Prashasthipathram'
- 2015: SIIMA Lifetime Achievement Award
- 2015: Vanitha Film Award – Lifetime Achievement
- 2015:TCR Bharath P.J.Antony Smaraka Abhinaya Prathibha Award
- 2015:IIFA Awards IIFA Utsavam – Performance in a Supporting Role (Female) – Nominated
- 2016: Parabrahma Chaithanya Award
- PK Rosy Award
- Devarajan Master Award
- Good Knight Film and Business Awards 2017

== See also ==
- Bharathan
- Kerala State Film Awards
- National Film Award for Best Supporting Actress
