= List of Malayalam films dubbed by Sreeja Ravi =

Sreeja Ravi dubbed for more than 1500 films for various actresses in Malayalam film industry. She is the winner of four time Kerala State Film Award for Best Dubbing Artist with record.

At the beginning of her career, she dubbed for children. Popular films that she dubbed for children are Malootty, Pookkalam Varavayi, Pappayude Swantham Appoos and Priyam.

Actress	Film(s)
Jolly	Ilaneer (1981)
Revathi	Kattathe Kilikoodu (1984); Moonnam Mura (1988)
Suhasini	Ente Upasana (First portion)(1984)
Lissy	Parayanumvayya Parayathirikkanumvayya (1986)
Chithra	Vasantha Sena (1986)
Lathika	Love Story (1986)
Sithara	Oridathu (1986); Mazhavilkavadi (1989); Puthiya Karukkal (1989); Orukkam (1990)
Rohini	January Oru Orma (1987); Crime Branch (1989); Rock n' Roll (2007)
Asha Jayaram	Thaniyavarthanam (1987)
Shyama	Neelakkurinji Poothappol (1987); Vishnulokam (1991); Ulladakkam (1991)
Karthika	Neelakkurinji Poothappol (1987) (One scene only); January Oru Orma (1987) (one scene in climax)
Kanakalatha	Swargam (1987)
Sunitha	Nirabhedangal (1987); Appu (1990); Gajakesariyogam(1990); Pookkalam Varavayi (1991); Neelagiri(1991); Mimics Parade (1991); Georgootty C/O Georgootty (1991); Irikku MD Akathundu (1991); Kasarkode Khaderbai (1992); Manthrikacheppu (1992); Vatsalyam (1993); Vakkeel Vasudev (1993); Sowbhagyam (1993); Nandini Oppol (1994)
Suparna Anand	Vaishali (1988)
Shobana	Mukthi (1988); Iyer The Great (1990) ( Climax roaring portion only )
Sonia	Daisy (1988)
Shabana	Janmantharam (1988)
Parvathy	Adharvam (1989); Pradeshika Varthakal(1989); Peruvannapurathe Visheshangal (1989); Subhayathra (1990); Souhridam (1991); Amina Tailors (1991)
Usha	Kireedam (1989); Apoorvam Chilar (1991); Avittam Thirunaal Aarogya Sriman (1995)
Kavitha Thampy	Bhadrachitta (1989); Nandagopalante Kusruthikal (1996)
Raaji	Jeevitham Oru Ragam (1989)
Thapasya	Samrajyam (1990)
Silk Smitha	Naale Ennundengil (1990)
Ranjini	Sunday 7PM (1990); Kouthuka Varthakal (1990)
Suma Jayaram	Kuttettan (1990); Malayogam (1990)
Anju	Thazhvaram (1990); Kattukuthira (1990)
Maathu	Amaram (1991); Sandhesam (1991); Kadalorakkattu (1991); Sadayam (1992); Aayushkkalam (1992); Oru Kadankatha Pole (1993); Ekalavyan (1993); Oru Abhibhashakante Case Diary (1995); Kaattile Thadi Thevarude Ana (1995); Aayiram Meni (1999)
Meena	Santhwanam (1991)
Shweta Menon	Anaswaram (1991); Welcome to Kodaikanal (1992); Thanthra (2005); Rock n' Roll (2007)
Vinduja Menon	Njan Gandharvan (1991); Aayiram Naavulla Ananthan (1996)
Suchithra	Nayam Vyakthamakkunnu (1991); Abhimanyu (1991); Thalastaanam (1992)
Charmila	Dhanam (1991); Keli (1991); Priyapetta Kukku (1992); Kalamasseriyil Kalyanayogam (1995); Thirumanassu (1995); Gajaraja Manthram (1997); Cochin Shadhi at Chennai 03 (2020)
Rudra	Post Box No. 27 (1991); Dhruvam (1993); Pidakkozhi Koovunna Noottandu (1994); Pavithram (1994)
Amala	Ulladakkam (1991) (beach scene only)
Rambha	Champakulam Thachan (1992); Chronic Bachelor (2003); Mayilattam (2004)
Beena Antony	Valayam (1992); Yodha (1992); Aagneyam (1993)
Ranjitha	Jonnie Walker (1992); Mafia (1993); Suvarna Simhaasanam (1997); Thattakam (1998)
Anusha	First Bell (1992)
Easwari Rao	Oottyppattanam (1992)
Shivaranjini	Thiruthalvadi (1992)
Surbhi Javeri Vyas	Chenkol (1993)
Seetha	Devasuram (1993); Bhoomi Geetham (1993); Dhada (1994); Shudhhamadhhalam (1994); Hitler (1996); Varnapakittu (1997); Pakalum Paathiravum (2023)
Aishwarya	Butterflies (1993); Narasimham (2000); Sharja To Sharja (2001)
Rekha	Sarovaram (1993)
Mohini	Varam (1993); Manthrika Kuthira (1996); Ullasapoongattu (1997); Mayaponman (1997); Ikkareyannente Maanasam (1997); Pranaya Nilavu (2000)
Sonia	Gazal (1993)
Kaveri	Porutham (1993); Vardhakyapuranam (1994); Sparsham (1999); Vasanthiyum Lakshmiyum Pinne Njaanum (1999); Janakan (2010)
Geetha Vijayan	Gandharvam (1993)
Seena Antony	Venkalam (1993); Hitler (1996)
Vinodhini	Ponnu Chami (1993)
Priyanka Anoop	Chamayam (1993)
Suvarna Mathew	Sthalathe Pradhana Payyans (1993)
Deepthi	Kalippattam (1993)
Annie	Rudraksham (1994); Kalyanji Anandji (1995); Mazhavilkoodaram (1995); Parvathy Parinayam (1995); Mr. Clean (1995); Mookillaa Rajyathe Murimookkan Rajaavu (1996)
Reshmi Soman	Chakoram (1994); Aadyathe Kanmani (1995)
Urvashi	Ethirppukal (1984); Pidakkozhi Koovunna Noottandu (1994) (Roaring portion on climax)
Meera	Malappuram Haji Mahanaya Joji (1994); Padanayakan (1996); Amma Ammaayiyamma (1998)
Chaithanya	Chief Minister K. R. Gowthami (1994)
Anju Aravind	Aksharam (1994); Kalyanapittennu (1997)
Manju Pillai	Mazhayethum Munpe (1995)
Manju Warrier	Sakshyam (1995); Sallapam (1996)
Devayani	Kakkakkum Poochakkum Kalyanam (1995); Kinnam Katta Kallan (1996); Sarkar Colony (2011); Anuragam (2023)
Haritha	Boxer (1995)
Mitra Joshi	Manthrikam (1995)
Darshana	Three Men Army (1995)
Keerthi Gopinath	Karma (1995); Manthra Mothiram (1997)
Chippy	Kusruthikaatu (1995); Minnaminuginum Minnukettu (1995); Ee Puzhayum Kadannu (1996); Hitler (1996); Achaammakkuttiyude Achaayan (1998)
Preetha Vijayakumar	Udayapuram Sulthan (1996); Red Indians (2001); Dubai(2001)
Divya Unni	Kalyana Sougandhikam (1996); Varnapakittu (1997); Nee Varuvolam (1997); Kadhanayakan (1997); Oru Maravathoor Kanavu (1998); The Truth (1998); Pranayavarnangal (1998); Aayushman Bhava (1998); Ustad (1999); Friends (1999); Aayiram Meni (1999); Aakasha Ganga (1999)
Shenbaga	Sulthan Hyderali (1996)
Anusha	Palluvaathukkal Thommichan (1996); Excuse Me Eathu Collegila (1996); K. L. 7/95 Erannamkulam North (1996); Gloria Fernendas from USA (1998)
Kavya Madhavan	Azhakiya Ravanan (1996); Bhoothakkannadi (1997); Chandranudikkunna Dikkil (1999); Thenkasipattanam (2000); Madhuranombarakattu (2000); Darling Darling (2000); Kochu Kochu Santhoshangal (2000); Sahayathrikakku Snehapoorvam (2000); Dosth (2001); Rakshasa Rajavu (2001); Meesa Madhavan (2002); Onnaman (2002); Oomappenninu Uriyadappayyan (2002); Kadha (2002); Thilakkam (2003); Pulival Kalyanam (2003); Runway (2004); Greetings (2004); Gaurisankaram (2004); Aparichithan (2004); Anandabhadram (2005); Iruvattam Manavaatti (2005); Kochi Rajavu (2005); Classmates (2006); Lion (2006); Vadakkumnathan (2006); Nadiya Kollappetta Rathri (2007); Inspector Garud (2007); Athisayan (2007; Kangaroo (2007); Twenty:20 (2008); Paappi Appacha (2010); Christian Brothers (2011); Vellaripravinte Changathi (2011); Aakashavani (2016)
Shalini	Aniyathipravu (1997); Kaikudunna Nilavu (1998; Sundarakilladi (1998); Prem Poojari (1999); Niram (1999); Alaipayuthey (2000) (Malayalam dubbed version)
Sangeetha	Gangothri (1997); Deepasthambham Mahascharyam (1999); Sradha (2000); Ingane Oru Nilapakshi (2000)
Nandini	Lelam (1997); Thachiledathu Chundan (1999); Maanikyan (2005)
Aishwarya Rai	Iruvar (1997) (Malayalam dubbed version)
Laila	Itha Oru Snehagatha (1997); War and Love (2003); Mahasamudram (2006)
Shraddha Nigam	Poonilamazha (1997)
Priya Raman	Aaraam Thampuran (1997); Asuravamsam (1997)
Sreejaya Nair	Vamsam (1997); Summer in Bethlehem (1998)
Vani Viswanath	Janathipathyam (1997); The Godman (1999); Independence (1999) (one scene only)
Rekha Mohan	Oru Yathramozhi (1997)
Chandini Shaju	Chandralekha (1997); Kallu Kondoru Pennu (1998)
Juhi Chawla	Harikrishnans (1998)
Abhirami	Njangal Santhushtaranu (1998); Meghasandesam (2001)
Suvalakshmi	Anuragakottaram (1998)
Sangita	Manthrikumaran (1998); Crime File (1999)
Mayoori	Summer in Bethlehem (1998); Summer Palace (2000)
Jomol	Punjabi House (1998)
Sulekha	Meenathil Thalikettu (1998); Chandamama (1999)
Ujjwala	Mangalya Pallakku (1998)
Dhanya Menone	Kanmadam (1998); Valliettan (2000)
Preeti Jhangiani	Mazhavillu (1999)
Indraja	F.I.R (1999); Independence (1999); Agninakshathram (2004)
Samyuktha Varma	Vazhunnor (1999); Swayamvara Panthal (2000); Madhuranombarakattu (2000) (only one dialogue in climax ) Meghasandesam (2001)
Rani	Olympian Anthony Adam (1999)
Manya	Joker (2000); Rakshasa Rajavu (2001); Kunjikoonan (2002)
Geethu Mohandas	Life Is Beautiful (2000); Nammal Thammil (2009)
Deepa Nair	Priyam (2000)
Ruchita Prasad	Mister Butler (2000)
Sishwa	Varnakazhchakal (2000); Rasikan (2004)
Vijayalakshmi	Devadoothan (2000)
Prema	Daivathinte Makan (2000)
Asin	Narendran Makan Jayakanthan Vaka (2001); Dasavathaaram (2008) (Malayalam dubbed version)
Ramya Nambisan	Narendran Makan Jayakanthan Vaka (2001); Pizza (2012) (Malayalam dubbed version)
Sindhu Menon	Uthaman (2001); Vaasthavam (2006)
Vasundara Das	Ravanaprabhu (2001); Vajram (2004)
Sucheta Khanna	Kakkakuyil (2001)
Nithya Das	Ee Parakkum Thalika (2001); Kanmashi (2002)
Rehna Navas	Antholanam (2001)
Ramya Krishnan	Onnaman (2002)
Navya Nair	Nandanam (2002) (effects only); Mazhathullikkilukkam (2002); Sarkar Dada (2006)
Uma Shankari	Kuberan (2002); Vasanthamalika (2002)
Charmy Kaur	Kattuchembakam (2002)
Nikhita Thukral	Kaiyyethum Doorathu (2002); Bus Conductor (2005); Bhargavacharitham Moonam Khandam (2006)
Kiran Rathod	Thandavam (2002); Gemini (2002) (Malayalam dubbed version)
Nandana	Snehithan (2002); Sethurama Iyer CBI (2004); Chathikkatha Chanthu (2004)
Jyothirmayi	Nandanam (2002); Pattalam (2003); Aayur Rekha (2007)
Gopika	Pranayamanithooval (2002); Vesham (2004); Chanthupottu (2005); Nerariyan CBI (2005); The Tiger (2005); Finger Print (2005); Pothan Vava (2006); Pachakuthira (2006); Keerthi Chakra (2006); The Don (2006); Mayavi (2007); Ali Bhai (2007); Nagaram (2007); Annan Thampi (2008); Malabar Wedding (2008)
Bhavana	C.I.D. Moosa (2003); Parayam (2004); Naran (2005); Chess (2006); Twenty:20 (2008); Marykkundoru Kunjaadu (2010); Doctor Love (2011)
Nayanthara	Manassinakkare (2003); Natturajavu (2004); Vismayathumbathu (2004); Rappakal (2005); Thaskaraveeran (2005); Arjun (2009) (Malayalam dubbed version); Body Guard (2010) (Phone portion only)
Jyothika	Dumm Dumm Dumm (2001) (Malayalam dubbed version); Dhool (2003) (Malayalam dubbed version)
Shruthika	Swapnam Kondu Thulabharam (2003)
Chaya Singh	Mullavalliyum Thenmavum (2003)
Pranathi	4 The People (2004)
Rathi Arumugam	Kerala House Udan Vilpanakku (2004)
Maya Viswanath	Chathikkatha Chanthu (2004)
Parvana	Kanninum Kannadikkum (2004); 916 (2012)
Priyamani	Sathyam (2004); Ottananayam (2005)
Karthika Mathew	Vellinakshathram (2004)
Meenakshi	Junior Senior (2005); Ponmudipuzhayorathu (2005)
Parul Yadav	Krithyam (2005)
Madhumitha	Boyy Friennd (2005)
Mallika Kapoor	Athbhutha Dweepu (2005)
Meera Vasudev	Thanmathra (2005)
Mamtha Mohandas	Lanka (2006); Nirakazhcha (2010)
Katrina Kaif	Balram vs. Tharadas (2006)
Sneha	Thuruppugulan (2006); Adimura (2020) (Malayalam dubbed version)
Roma Asrani	Notebook (2006); Chocolate (2007); July 4 (2007); Minnaminnikoottam (2008); Shakespeare M.A. Malayalam (2008); Lollipop (2008); Utharaswayamvaram (2009); Kathayile Nayika (2011); Grandmaster (2012); Namasthe Bali (2015); Sathya (2017)
Padmapriya Janakiraman	Vadakkumnadhan (2006)
Renuka Menon	Vargam (2006)
Lakshmi Gopalaswamy	Paranju Theeratha Visheshangal (2007)
Gajala	Speed Track (2007)
Vimala Raman	Nasrani (2007); Pranayakalam (2007)
Pooja Umashankar	Panthaya Kozhi (2007)
Sharbani Mukherjee	Rakkilipattu (2007)
Mita Vashisht	Rakkilipattu (2007)
Raai Laxmi	Parunthu (2008); Chattambinadu (2009); Rajaadhi Raaja (2014)
Trisha	The Target (2006) (Malayalam dubbed version); Rudran (2008) (Malayalam dubbed version)
Sheela Kaur	Mayabazar (2008); Makeup Man (2011)
Bhama	One Way Ticket (2008); Cycle (2008)
Meera Nandan	Mulla (2008)
Sunitha Varma	Crazy Gopalan (2008)
Lakshmi Sharma	Kanichukulangarayil CBI (2008)
Meenakshi	Chattambinadu (2009)
Shriya Saran	Pranayamayi (2002) (Malayalam dubbed version); Pokkiri Raja (2010); Casanovva (2012)
Mithra Kurian	Body Guard (2010); Note Out (2011); Ladies and Gentleman (2013)
Akhila	Kaaryasthan (2010); Teja Bhai & Family (2011)
Khushboo	Pranchiyettan & the Saint (2010)
Kaniha	Drona (2010)
Sruthi Lakshmi	Swantham Bharya Zindabad (2010)
Ananya	Seniors (2011); Nadodimannan (2013)
Kamna Jethmalani	Makeup Man (2011)
Saranya Mohan	Nadakame Ulakam (2011)
Mythili	Kanakompathu (2011)
Souparnika Subhash	Bhagavathipuram (2011)
Poonam Bajwa	Venicile Vyapari (2011); Shikari (2012)
Amala Paul	Run Baby Run (2012); Naayak (2013) (Malayalam dubbed version)
Kajal Agarwal	Businessman (2012) (Malayalam dubbed version)
Shamna Kasim	Aaru Sundarimaarude Katha (2013)
Ineya	Ayaal (2013); Radio (2013)
Meghna Raj	Red Wine (2013)
Sana Khan	Climax (2013)
Kamalinee Mukherjee	Natholi Oru Cheriya Meenalla (2013)
Ileana D'Cruz	Kallan Kalli (2013) (Malayalam dubbed version)
Meera Jasmine	Manju Peyyum Munpe (2014) (Malayalam dubbed version)
Diya	Bhaiyya Bhaiyya (2014)
Varalaxmi Sarathkumar	Kasaba (2016)
Soumya Anand	Puthiya Niyamam (2016)
Priya Shri	Majnu (2016) (Malayalam dubbed version)
Anushka Shetty	Baahubali 2: The Conclusion (2017) (Malayalam version)
Sridevi Kapoor	Mom (2017) (Malayalam dubbed version)
Rachel Weisz	Black Widow (2021) (Malayalam dubbed version)
Simran	Rocketry: The Nambi Effect (2021) (Malayalam version)
Sai Pallavi	Shyam Singha Roy (2022) (Malayalam version)

== 1970's and 80's ==
Year	Film	For Whom
1975	Uttarayanam	Crowd voice
1978	Thampu	Crowd voice
1981	Ilaneer	Renuka.C.Nair
1983	Kattathe Kilikoodu	Revathi
1983	Kattathe Kilikoodu	Master Prashobh
1984	Ethirppukal	Urvashi
1985	Archana Aaradhana	Baby Soumya
1985	Soundaryappinakkam	Master Sunil
1985	Soundaryappinakkam	Baby Vidya
1985	Oru Nokku Kanan	Radha's Character
1985	Upahaaram	Child Artist
1985	Parayanumvayya Parayathirikkanumvayya	Lissy
1985	Akkacheyude Kunjuvava	Master Boban
1985	Vasantha Sena	Chithra
1985	Kandu Kandarinju	Master Prashobh
1985	Kandu Kandarinju	One of the hostel Girl
1985	Ente Kanakkuyil	Master Vimal
1986	Poovinu Puthiya Poonthennal	Sujitha
1986	Katturumbinum Kaathukuthu	Child Artist
1986	kunjattakilikal	Child Artist
1986	Love Story	Lathika
1986	Rajavinte Makan	Master Prashobh
1986	Mizhineerpoovukal	shalini's character
1986	Oridathu	Sithara
1986	Ennu Nathante Nimmi	Receptionist
1986	Akalangalil	Baby Resmi
1986	Geetham	Master Amith
1987	January Oru Orma	Rohini
1987	Agni Muhurtham	Child Artist
1987	Manivathoorile Aayiram Sivarathrikal	for the character of Vineesa
1987	Theekkattu	Child Artist
1987	Thaniyavarthanam	Asha Jayaram
1987	Neela Kurinji Poothappol	Shyama
1987	Neela Kurinji Poothappol	Lakshmi Mariya
1987	Neela Kurinji Poothappol	Karthika (One scene only)
1987	Nirabhedangal	Sujitha
1987	Nirabhedangal	Sunitha
1987	Oru Minnaminunginte Nurunguvettam	Master Vinu
1987	Achuvettante Veedu	Nandini
1987	Nombarathi Poovu	for the character of Nithya
1987	Bhoomiyile Rajakkanmar	for the character of young servant
1988	Vaishali	Suparna Anand
1988	Mukthi	Shobhana
1988	Moonnam Mura	Revathi
1988	Daisy	Sonia
1988	Janmantharam	Shabana
1988	Pattanapravesham	Aloor Elsy
1988	Kakkothikkavile Appooppan Thaadikal	Kaveri
1988	Kakkothikkavile Appooppan Thaadikal	Manthra
1988	Kakkothikkavile Appooppan Thaadikal	many child artists
1988	Thoranam	Yamuna
1988	Bheekaran	for the character of Bheeman Raghu's sister
1989	Mazhavilkavadi	Sithara
1989	Adharvam	Parvathi
1989	Pradeshika Varthakal	Parvathi
1989	Peruvannapurathe Visheshangal	Parvathi
1989	Puthiya Karukkal	Sithara
1989	Puthiya Karukkal	Baby Sujatha
1989	Mrigaya	Sunitha
1989	Kireedam	Usha
1989	Crime Branch	Rohini
1989	Bhadrachitta	Kavitha Thampy
1989	Dasharatham	Child artists
1989	Rugmini	for the character of Seetha
1989	Jeevitham Oru Raagam	Raji

August 1 - lissy

== 1990s ==
Year	Film	For Whom
1990	Malootty	Baby Shamili
1990	Shubhayathra	Parvathi
1990	Appu	Sunitha
1990	Gajakesariyogam	Sunitha
1990	Samrajyam	Thapasya
1990	Orukkam	Sithara
1990	Naale Ennundengil	Silk Smitha
1990	Sunday 7 PM	Ranjini
1990	Kouthuka Varthakal	Ranjini
1990	Kuttettan	Suma Jairam
1990	Malayogam	Suma Jairam
1990	Thalayanamanthram	for the character of Sreenivasan's sister
1990	Sthreekku Vendi Sthree	for the character of Devi
1990	Shesham Screenil	to the raped girl
1990	Indrajaalam	Rajan P Dev's daughter
1990	Thazhvaram	Anju
1990	Kattukuthira	Anju
1991	Amaram	Maathu
1991	Kadalorakkattu	Maathu
1991	Sandhesam	Maathu
1991	Santhwanam	Meena
1991	Anaswaram	Shweta Menon
1991	Kilukkampetti	Baby Shamili
1991	Njan Gandharvan	Vinduja Menon
1991	Nayam Vyakthamakkunnu	Suchithra
1991	Pookkalam Varavayi	Baby Shamili
1991	Pookkalam Varavayi	Sunitha
1991	Neelagiri	Sunitha
1991	Mimics Parade	Sunitha
1991	Georgootty C/O Georgootty	Sunitha
1991	Irikku MD Akathundu	Sunitha
1991	Irikku MD Akathundu	Child artist
1991	Keli	Charmila
1991	Dhanam	Charmila
1991	Souhridam	Parvathi
1991	Souhridam	Child artist
1991	Abhimanyu	Suchitra Murali
1991	Amina Tailors	Parvathi
1991	Post Box No. 27	Rudra
1991	Chanchattam	Master Anand
1991	Vishnulokam	Shyama
1991	Vishnulokam	child artist
1991	Apoorvam Chilar	Usha
1991	Apoorvam Chilar	child artist
1991	Ulladakkam	Shyama
1991	Ulladakkam	Amala Akkineni (Beach scene only)
1991	Innathe Program	Indu's hostel roommate
1991	Sundhari Kakka	Rekha's friends
1992	Sadayam	Maathu
1992	Aayushkalam	Maathu
1992	Champakulam Thachan	Rambha
1992	Valayam	Beena Antony
1992	Johnnie Walker	Ranjitha
1992	Priyapetta Kukku	Charmila
1992	Welcome to Kodaikanal	Shweta Menon
1992	Thalastaanam	Suchitra Murali
1992	First Bell	Anusha
1992	My Dear Muthachan	Baby Renju
1992	Oottyppattanam	Easwari Rao
1992	Thiruthalvaadi	Shivaranjini
1992	Manthrikacheppu	Sunitha
1992	Kasarkode Khaderbai	Sunitha
1992	Pappayude Swantham Appoos	Master Badusha
1992	My Dear Muthachan	Baby Renju
1992	Daddy	Master Sharan
1992	Neelakurukkan	for the character of Radhika
1992	Kauravar	Thilakan's daughters
1992	Soorya Gayathri	Nedumudi Venu's second daughters
1992	Ponnaramthottathe Raajaavu	Baby Silpa
1992	Ponnaramthottathe Raajaavu	Devan's friends wife
1993	Dhruvam	Rudra
1993	Vatsalyam	Sunitha
1993	Sowbhagyam	Sunitha
1993	Vakkeel Vasudev	Sunitha
1993	Devasuram	Seetha
1993	Bhoomi Geetham	Seetha
1993	Butterflies	Aiswarya
1993	Sarovaram	Rekha
1993	Varam	Mohini
1993	Mafia	Ranjitha
1993	Chenkol	Surbhi Javeri Vyas
1993	Ghazal	Sonia
1993	Porutham	Kaveri
1993	Gandharvam	Geetha Vijayan
1993	venkalam	Seena Antony
1993	Aagneyam	Beena Antony
1993	Ponnu Chami	Vinodhini
1993	Chamayam	Priyanka M Nair
1993	Paithrukam	Gynecologist
1993	Samaagamam	Master Roshan
1993	Oru Kadankatha Pole	Maathu
1993	Ekalavyan	Maathu
1993	Sthalathe Pradhana Payyans	Suvarna Mathew
1993	Kalippattam	Deepthi
1993	Kalippattam	child artist
1994	Pavithram	Rudra
1994	Nandini Oppol	Sunitha
1994	Rudraksham	Annie
1994	Vardhakyapuranam	Kaveri
1994	Vadhu Doctoranu	Usha
1994	Shudhamaddalam	Seetha
1994	Dadha	Seetha
1994	Chakoram	Reshmi Soman
1994	Pidakkozhi Koovunna Noottandu	Rudra
1994	Pidakkozhi Koovunna Noottandu	Urvasi (roaring portion only)
1994	Malappuram Haji Mahanaya Joji	Meera
1994	Chief Minister K. R. Gowthami	Chaithanya
1994	Commissioner	Baby Devi
1994	Commissioner	Journalist
1994	Sagaram Sakshi	Sukanya's friend
1994	Manathe Vellitheru	Master Swaroop
1994	Manathe Vellitheru	Baby Ammu
1995	Karma	Keerthi Gopinath
1995	Sakshyam	Manju Warrier
1995	Nirnayam	Baby Shamili
1995	Mazhayethum Munpe	Manju Pillai
1995	Aksharam	Anju Aravind
1995	Aadyathe Kanmani	Reshmi Soman
1995	Kokkarakko	Gayathri
1995	Kalyanji Anandji	Annie
1995	Mazhavilkoodaram	Annie
1995	Parvathy Parinayam	Annie
1995	Kakkakum Poochakkum Kalyanam	Devayani
1995	Avittam Thirunaal Aarogya Sriman	Usha
1995	Oru Abhibhashakante Case Diary	Maathu
1995	Manthrikam	Mitra Joshi
1995	Manthrikam	Maria's character
1995	Kaattile Thadi Thevarude Ana	Maathu
1995	Kaattile Thadi Thevarude Ana	child artist
1995	Boxer	Haritha
1995	Boxer	street girl
1995	Boxer	Airport announcement
1995	Kalamasseriyil Kalyanayogam	Charmila
1995	Thirumanassu	Charmila
1995	Three Men Army	Darshana
1995	Kusruthikaatu	Chippi
1995	Minnaminuginum Minnukettu	Chippi
1996	Ee Puzhayum Kadannu	Chippi
1996	Azhakiya Ravanan	Kavya Madhavan
1996	Lalanam	Baby Shamili
1996	Sallapam	Manju Warrier
1996	Padanayakan	Meera
1996	Mr. Clean	Annie
1996	Mookkilla Rajyathu Murimookkan Rajavu	Annie
1996	Manthrika Kuthira	Mohini
1996	Udayapuram Sulthan	Preetha Vijayakumar
1996	Kinnam Katta Kallan	Devayani
1996	Kalyana Sougandhikam	Divya Unni
1996	Aayiram Naavulla Ananthan	Vinduja Menon
1996	Pallivaathukkal Thommichan	Anusha
1996	K. L. 7/95 Ernakulam North	Anusha
1996	Excuse Me Ethu Collegila	Anusha
1996	Nandagopaalante Kusruthikal	Kavitha Thampy
1996	Sulthan Hyderali	Shenbaga
1996	Sulthan Hyderali	Shenbaga's friend
1996	Hitler	Chippy
1996	Hitler	Seetha
1996	Hitler	Seena Antony
1997
1997	Gangothri	Sangeetha
1997	Aniyathipravu	Shalini
1997	Lelam	Nandini
1997	Iruvar	Aishwarya Rai
1997	Ullasapoongattu	Mohini
1997	Mayaponman	Mohini
1997	Ikkareyanente Manasam	Mohini
1997	Itha Oru Snehagatha	Laila
1997	Poonilamazha	Shraddha Nigam
1997	Aaraam Thampuran	Priya Raman
1997	Asuravamsam	Priya Raman
1997	Gajaraja Manthram	Charmila
1997	Bhoothakkannadi	Kavya Madhavan
1997	Vamsam	Sreejaya Nair
1997	Kalyanapittannu	Anju Aravind
1997	Manthramothiram	Keerthi Gopinath
1997	Janathipathyam	Vani Viswanath
1997	Suvarna Simhaasanam	Ranjitha
1997	Oru Yathramozhi	Rekha Mohan
1997	Chandralekha	Chandini Shaju
1997	Varnapakittu	Seetha
1997	Varnapakittu	Divya Unni
1997	Katha Nayakan	Divya Unni
1997	Nee Varuvolam	Divya Unni
1998	Oru Maravathoor Kanavu	Divya Unni
1998	The Truth	Divya Unni
1998	Pranayavarnangal	Divya Unni
1998	Aayushman Bhava	Divya Unni
1998	Kallu Kondoru Pennu	Chandini Shaju
1998	Harikrishnans	Juhi Chawla
1998	Sundarakilladi	Shalini
1998	Kaikudunna Nilavu	Shalini
1998	Njangal Santhushtaranu	Abhirami
1998	Anuragakottaram	Suvalakshmi
1998	Manthrikumaran	Sangeetha
1998	Gloria Fernandes from USA	Anusha
1998	Summer in Bethlehem	Mayoori
1998	Summer in Bethlehem	Sreejaya Nair
1998	Achaammakkuttiyude Achaayan	Chippy
1998	Thattakam	Ranjitha
1998	Thattakam	Baby Niveditha
1998	Kanmadam	Dhanya Menon
1998	Mangalya Pallakku	Ujjwala
1998	Punjabi House	Jomol
1998	Meenathil Thalikettu	Sulekha
1998	Amma Ammaayiyamma	Meera
1999	Ustad	Divya Unni
1999	Friends	Divya Unni
1999	Aakasha Ganga	Divya Unni
1999	Aayiram Meni	Divya Unni
1999	Aayiram Meni	Maathu
1999	Mazhavillu	Preeti Jhangiani
1999	Sparsham	Kaveri
1999	F.I.R	Indraja
1999	Independence	Indraja
1999	Prem Poojari	Shalini
1999	Niram	Shalini
1999	Chandamama	Sulekha
1999	Vazhunnor	Samyuktha Varma
1999	Chandranudikkunna Dikkil	Kavya Madhavan
1999	The Godman	Vani Viswanath
1999	Crime File	Sangeetha
1999	Thachiledathu Chundan	Nandini
1999	Olympiyan Anthony Adam	Rani
1999	Deepasthambham Mahascharyam	Sangeetha
1999	Vasanthiyum Lakshmiyum Pinne Njaanum	Kaveri

== 2000s ==
Year	Film	For Whom
2000	Swayamvara Panthal	Samyuktha Varma
2000	Joker	Manya
2000	Narasimham	Aiswarya
2000	Pranaya Nilavu	Mohini
2000	Alaipayuthey	Shalini
2000	Life Is Beautiful	Geethu Mohandas
2000	Summer Palace	Mayoori
2000	Ingane Oru Niapakshi	Sangeetha
2000	Sradha	Sangeetha
2000	Priyam	Manjima
2000	Priyam	Deepa Nair
2000	Mister Butler	Ruchitha Prasad
2000	Varnakkazhchakal	Sishwa
2000	Valliettan	Dhanya Menone
2000	Devadoothan	Vijayalakshmi
2000	Daivathinte Makan	Prema
2000	Thenkasipattanam	Kavya Madhavan
2000	Madhuranombarakattu	Kavya Madhavan
2000	Darling Darling	Kavya Madhavan
2000	Kochu Kochu Santhoshangal	Kavya Madhavan
2000	Sahayathrikakku Snehapoorvam	Kavya Madhavan
2001	Dosth	Kavya Madhavan
2001	Rakshasa Rajavu	Kavya Madhavan
2001	Rakshasa Rajavu	Manya
2001	Red Indians	Preetha Vijayakumar
2001	Dubai	Preetha Vijayakumar
2001	Narendran Makan Jayakanthan Vaka	Asin
2001	Narendran Makan Jayakanthan Vaka	Ramya Nambisan
2001	Ravanaprabhu	Vasundara Das
2001	Uthaman	Sindhu Menon
2001	Sharja To Sharja	Aishwarya
2001	Dumm Dumm Dumm	Jyotika
2001	Meghasandesam	Abhirami
2001	Meghasandesam	Samyuktha Varma
2001	Kakkakuyil	Sucheta Khanna
2001	Antholanam	Rehana Navas
2001	Ee Parakkum Thalika	Nithya Das
2002	Kanmashi	Nithya Das
2002	Meesha Madhavan	Kavya Madhavan
2002	Onnaman	Kavya Madhavan
2002	Kadha	Kavya Madhavan
2002	Oomappenninu Uriyadappayyan	Kavya Madhavan
2002	Onnaman	Ramya Krishnan
2002	Mazhathullikilukkam	Navya Nair
2002	Kattuchembakam	Charmy Kaur
2002	Kunjikoonan	Manya
2002	Snehithan	Nandana
2002	Thandavam	Kiran Rathod
2002	Gemini	Kiran Rathod
2002	Kuberan	Uma Shankari
2002	Vasanthamalika	Uma Shankari
2002	Kaiyethum Doorathu	Nikhita Thukral
2002	Nandanam	Jyothirmayi
2002	Nandanam	Navya Nair (Crying and Laughing Portion's Only)
2002	Pranayamanithooval	Gopika
2002	Pranayamayi	Shriya Saran
2003	Chronic Bachelor	Rambha
2003	Thilakkam	Kavya Madhavan
2003	Pulival Kalyanam	Kavya Madhavan
2003	C.I.D. Moosa	Bhavana
2003	Dhool	Jyothika
2003	War and Love	Laila
2003	Mullavalliyum Thenmavum	Chaya Singh
2003	Pattalam	Jyothirmayi
2003	Swapnam Kondu Thulabharam	Shrutika
2003	Manassinakkare	Nayanthara
2004	Natturajavu	Nayanthara
2004	Vismayathumbathu	Nayanthara
2004	Runway	Kavya Madhavan
2004	Aparichithan	Kavya Madhavan
2004	Greetings	Kavya Madhavan
2004	Gaurisankaram	Kavya Madhavan
2004	Vesham	Gopika
2004	Sethurama Iyer CBI	Nandana
2004	4 The People	Pranathi
2004	Mayilattam	Rambha
2004	Parayam	Bhavana
2004	Agninakshathram	Indraja
2004	Kerala House Udan Vilpanakku	Rathi Arumugam
2004	Kanninum Kannadikkum	Parvana
2004	Vajram	Vasundara Das
2004	Rasikan	Sishwa
2004	Sathyam	Priyamani
2004	Vellinakshatram	Karthika Mathew
2004	Chathikkatha Chanthu	Nandana
2004	Chathikkatha Chanthu	Maya Viswanath
2005	Junior Senior	Meenakshi
2005	Anandabhadram	Kavya Madhavan
2005	Kochi Rajavu	Kavya Madhavan
2005	Iruvattam Manavaatti	Kavya Madhavan
2005	Chanthupottu	Gopika
2005	Finger Print	Gopika
2005	The Tiger	Gopika
2005	Nerariyan CBI	Gopika
2005	Naran	Bhavana
2005	Ottananayam	Priyamani
2005	Boyy Friennd	Madhumitha
2005	Thaskaraveeran	Nayanthara
2005	Rappakal	Nayanthara
2005	Krithyam	Parul Yadav
2005	Athbhutha Dweepu	Mallika Kapoor
2005	Bus Conductor	Nikhita Thukral
2005	Thanmathra	Meera Vasudevan
2005	Maanikyan	Nandini
2006	Thanthra	Shweta Menon
2006	Pothan Vava	Gopika
2006	Pachakuthira	Gopika
2006	Keerthichakra	Gopika
2006	The Don	Gopika
2006	Lanka	Mamtha Mohandas
2006	Vargam	Renuka Menon
2006	Bhargavacharitham Moonam Khandam	Nikhita Thukral
2006	Vaasthavam	Sindhu Menon
2006	Balram vs. Tharadas	Katrina Kaif
2006	Thuruppugulan	Sneha
2006	Mahasamudram	Laila
2006	Classmates	Kavya Madhavan
2006	Lion	Kavya Madhavan
2006	Vadakkumnadhan	Kavya Madhavan
2006	Notebook	Roma Asrani
2006	Vadakkumnadhan	Padmapriya Janakiraman
2007	Chocolate	Roma Asrani
2007	July 4	Roma Asrani
2007	Speed Track	Gajala
2007	Paranju Theeratha Visheshangal	Lakshmi Gopalaswami
2007	Nadiya Kollappetta Rathri	Kavya Madhavan
2007	Inspector Garud	Kavya Madhavan
2007	Athisayan	Kavya Madhavan
2007	Kangaroo	Kavya Madhavan
2007	Mayavi	Gopika
2007	Ali Bhai	Gopika
2007	Nagaram	Gopika
2007	Nasrani	Vimala Raman
2007	Panthaya Kozhi	Pooja Umashankar
2007	Rock N Roll	Rohini
2007	Rock N Roll	Shweta Menon
2007	Ayur Rekha	Jyothirmayi
2007	Rakkilipattu	Sharbani Mukherjee
2007	Rakkilipattu	Mita Vashisht
2008	Parunthu	Raai Laxmi
2008	Twenty:20	Bhavana
2008	Twenty:20	Kavya Madhavan
2008	Annan Thambi	Gopika
2008	Malabar Wedding	Gopika
2008	Dasavathaaram	Asin
2008	Rudran	Trisha
2008	Mayabazar	Sheela Kaur
2008	One Way Ticket	Bhama
2008	Cycle	Bhama
2008	Mulla	Meera Nandan
2008	Crazy Gopalan	Sunitha Varma
2008	Kanichukulangarayil CBI	Lakshmi Sharma
2008	Minnaminnikoottam	Roma Asrani
2008	Lollipop	Roma Asrani
2008	Shakespeare M.A. Malayalam	Roma Asrani
2009	Utharaswayamvaram	Roma Asrani
2009	Chattambinadu	Raai Laxmi
2009	Chattambinadu	Meenakshi
2009	Nammal Thammil	Geethu Mohandas
2009	Arjun	Nayanthara

== 2010s ==
Year	Film	For Whom	Note(s)
2010	Pokkiri Raja	Shriya Saran	
2010	Body Guard	Mithra Kurian	
2010	Body Guard	Nayanthara's phone portion	
2010	Paappi Appacha	Kavya Madhavan	
2010	Kaaryasthan	Akhila	
2010	Janakan	Kaveri	
2010	Marykkundoru Kunjaadu	Bhavana	
2010	Drona 2010	Kaniha	
2010	Nirakazhcha	Mamtha Mohandas	
2010	Pranchiyettan & the Saint	Khushbu	
2010	Swantham Bharya Zindabad	Sruthi Lakshmi	
2011	Seniors	Ananya	
2011	Doctor Love	Bhavana	
2011	Christian Brothers	Kavya Madhavan	
2011	Vellaripravinte Changathi	Kavya Madhavan	
2011	Makeup Man	Sheela Kaur	
2011	Makeup Man	Kamna Jethmalani	
2011	Note Out	Mithra Kurian	
2011	Kathayile Nayika	Roma Asrani	
2011	Nadakame Ulakam	Saranya Mohan	
2011	Kanakompathu	Mythili	
2011	Teja Bhai & Family	Akhila	
2011	Ulakam Chuttum Valiban	Vandana Menon	
2011	Sarkar Colony	Devayani	
2011	Bhagavathipuram	Souparnika Subhash	
2011	Venicile Vyapari	Poonam Bajwa	
2012	Shikari	Poonam Bajwa	
2012	Casanovva	Shriya Saran	
2012	916	Parvana	
2012	Grandmaster	Roma Asrani	
2012	Pizza	Remya Nambeesan	Dubbing film
2012	Run Baby Run	Amala Paul	
2013	Nayak	Amala Paul	Dubbing film
2013	Aaru Sundarimaarude Katha	Shamna Kasim	
2013	Red Wine	Meghna Raj	
2013	Climax	Sana Khan	
2013	Ayaal	Ineya	Won Kerala State Film Award
2013	Radio	Ineya	
2013	Natholi Oru Cheriya Meenalla	Kamalinee Mukherjee	
2013	Nadodimannan	Ananya	
2013	Ladies and Gentleman	Mithra Kurian	
2013	Kallan Kalli	Ileana D'Cruz	
2014	Bhaiyya Bhaiyya	Diya	
2014	Rajadhiraja	Raai Laxmi	
2014	Manju Peyyum Munpe	Meera Jasmine	Dubbed film
2015	Namasthe Bali	Roma Asrani	
2016	Kasaba	Varalaxmi Sarathkumar	
2016	Aakashavani	Kavya Madhavan	
2016	Puthiya Niyamam	Soumya Anand	
2016	Majnu	Priya Shri	Dubbing film
2016	White	Huma Qureshi's friend	
2017	Baahubali 2: The Conclusion	Anushka Shetty	Malayalam Version
2017	Mom	Sridevi	Dubbing film
2017	Sathya	Roma Asrani	
2017	Sunday Holiday	Vinaya Prasad	

== 2020s ==
Year	Film	For Whom	Note (s)
2020	Cochin Shadhi at Chennai 03	Charmila Manoharan	
2020	Adimura	Sneha Naidu	Malayalam Dubbed Version
2021	Black Widow	Rachel Weisz (American film)	Malayalam Dubbed Version
2021	Rocketry: The Nambi Effect	Simran Bagga	Malayalam Dubbed Version
2022	Shyam Singha Roy	Sai Pallavi	Malayalam Dubbed Version
2023	Pakalum Paathiravum	Seetha	
2023	Anuragam	Devayani	
2023	Shaakuntalam	Aditi Balan	Malayalam Dubbed Version
2023	Shaakuntalam	Gautami	Malayalam Dubbed Version
2024	Extra Decent	Vinaya Prasad	

== As dubbing conductor ==
Year	Project	Category	Director
2019	Love Action Drama	Film	Dhyan Sreenivasan
2025	F For Freedom	Short film	Arjun & Riya
