= List of Malayalam films of 1995 =

The following is a list of Malayalam films released in the year 1995.

Title	Director	Cast	Screenplay
Special Squad	Krishnadas	Babu Antony, Charmila	Kaloor Dennis
Sargavasantham	Anil Das	Siddique, Chippy	
Aniyan Bava Chetan Bava	Rajasenan	Jayaram, Sangeetha, Kasthuri	Rafi-Mecartin
Achan Kombath Amma Varambath	Anil Babu	Murali, Bharathi, Thilakan	
Nirnayam	Sangeeth Sivan	Mohanlal, Heera, Lalu Alex	
Aksharam	Sibi Malayil	Suresh Gopi, Annie, Madhavi	John Paul
Mimics Action 500	Balu Kiriyath	Rajan P. Dev, Zainuddin	
Simhavalan Menon	Viji Thampi	Jagadish, Urvashi	Sasidharan Arattuvazhi
Sreeragam	George Kithu	Jayaram, Vinduja Menon, Geetha	
Kusruthikaatu	Suresh Vinu	Jayaram, Kanaka, Jagathy Sreekumar	J. Pallassery
Peter Scott	Biju Viswanath	Jagathy Sreekumar, Raghuvaran, Charmila	
Samudhayam	Ambili	Madhu, KPAC Lalitha, Ashokan, Baiju	
Mangalyasootram	Saajan	Jagathy Sreekumar, Kalpana, Murali	
Highway	Jayaraj	Suresh Gopi, Vijayaraghavan, Bhanupriya	
Kaattile Thadi Thevarude Ana	K. K. Haridas	Jagathy Sreekumar, Siddique	
Manikya Chempazhukka	Thulasidas	Mukesh, Sivaranjani, Maathu	A. K. Sajan
Thovalapookkal	Suresh Unnithan	Jagathy Sreekumar, Urvashi	
Spadikam	Bhadran	Mohanlal, Urvashi, Thilakan	
Mazhayethum Munpe	Kamal	Mammootty, Shobhana, Annie	Sreenivasan
Mannar Mathai Speaking	Mani C. Kappan	Sai Kumar, Mukesh, Innocent, Vani Viswanath	Siddique - Lal
Oru Abhibhashakante Case Diary	K. Madhu	Mammootty, Heera, Vijayaraghavan	S. N. Swamy
Alancheri Thamprakkal	Sunil	Nedumudi Venu, Narendra Prasad, Dileep, Annie	Robin Thirumala
Prayikkara Pappan	T. S. Suresh Babu	Murali, Jagadish, Geetha, Chippy	
Thacholi Varghese Chekavar	T. K. Rajeev Kumar	Mohanlal, Urmila Matondkar, Vineeth	P. Balachandran
Minnaminuginum Minnukettu	Thulasidas	Jayaram, Shobana, Jagadish	
Saadaram	Jose Thomas	Suresh Gopi, Geetha, Lalu Alex	A. K. Lohithadas
Punnaram	Sasi Sankar	Jagathy Sreekumar, Kalpana	
Street	Anil Babu	Vikram, Babu antony, Geetha	
Kalamasseriyil Kalyanayogam	Balu Kiriyath	Mukesh, Charmila, Premkumar	
Three Men Army	Nissar	Dileep, Devayani, Indrans, Prem Kumar	
Agrajan	Dennis Joseph	Manoj K. Jayan, Thilakan, Kasthuri	Dennis Joseph
Karma	Jomon	Suresh Gopi, Ranjitha, Thilakan	T A Razzaq
Avittam Thirunaal Aarogya Sriman	Viji Thampi	Jagathy, Balachandramenon, Shanthi Krishna, Jagadish	
Hijack	Gopalakrishnan	Siddique, Farah Naaz	
Thumboli Kadappuram	Jayaraj	Manoj K. Jayan, Priya Raman, Vijayaraghavan	
Aadyathe Kanmani	Rajasenan	Jayaram, Biju Menon, Sudha Rani, Chippy	Rafi-Mecartin
Boxer	Biju Kottarakkara	Babu Antony, Jagathy Sreekumar	
Sundarimare Sookshikkuka	Rajesh Narayanan	Devan, Shari, Rohini	
Thirumanassu	Aswathi Gopinath	Sai Kumar, Charmila	
Radholsavam	Anil Babu	Suresh Gopi, Kasthuri, Vijayaraghavan, Maathu	J. Pallassery
Chantha	Sunil	Babu Antony, Mohini	
Chaithanyam	Jayan	Murali, Madhavi	
Parvathy Parinayam	P. G. Viswambharan	Mukesh, Annie, Anju Arvind, Prem Kumar	
Thakshashila	Sreekumar	Suresh Gopi, Vani Viswanath, Shanthi Krishna	A.K.Sajan
No. 1 Snehatheeram Bangalore North	Sathyan Anthikkad	Mammootty, Priya Raman, Chippy	Fazil
Mazhavilkoodaram	Siddique Shameer	Rahman, Annie	
Manthrikam	Thampi Kannanthanam	Mohanlal, Priya Raman, Jagadish, Raghuvaran	Babu Pallassery
Sundari Neeyum Sundaran Njanum	Thulasidas	Mukesh, Ranjitha, Thilakan	
Sasinas	Thejus Peruman	Ashokan, Rudra, Geetha Vijayan	
Ormakalundayirikkanam	T. V. Chandran	Mammootty, Master Nithin, Bharath Gopi	
Kidilol Kidilam	Paulson	Abi, Kottayam Nazeer, Anju Aravind	
Kokkarakko	K. K. Haridas	Dileep, Vijayakumar, Sudheesh	
Sindoora Rekha	Sibi Malayil	Suresh Gopi, Dileep, Shobana	Raghunath Paleri
Mangalam Veettil Manaseswari Gupta	Suresh Vinu	Jayaram, Vani Viswanath	
Achan Rajavu Appan Jethavu	Nissar	Mukesh, Devayani	
Tom & Jerry	Kaladharan	Mukesh, Annie, Jagadish	
Agnidevan	Venu Nagavally	Mohanlal, Revathi, Rohini Hattangadi	P. Balachandran
Arabikadaloram	S. Chandran	Sanjay, Anju	
The King	Shaji Kailas	Mammootty, Vani Viswanath, Murali	Renji Panicker
Keerthanam	Venu B. Nair	Mukesh, Pragathi	
Kakkakum Poochakkum Kalyanam	K. K. Haridas	Dileep, Devayani, Sudheesh	
Rajakeeyam	Saji	Babu Antony, Charmila	
Kalyanji Anandji	Balu Kiriyath	Mukesh, Annie, Harisree Asokan	
Pai Brothers	Ali Akbar	Innocent, Jagathy	
Sakshyam	Mohan	Murali, Suresh Gopi, Gautami.	Cherian Kalpakavadi
Arabia	Jayaraj	Babu Antony, Charmila, Anusha	
Indian Military Intelligence	T. S. Suresh Babu	Babu Antony, Murali, Chippy	
Puthukkottayile Puthumanavalan	Rafi Mecartin	Jayaram, Prem Kumar, Annie	Rafi Mecartin
Sipayi Lahala	Vinayan	Mukesh, Vani Viswanath, Sreenivasan	Sreenivasan
Ezharakoottam	Kareem	Madhupal, Dileep, Nadirsha, Geetha	
Vrudhanmare Sookshikkuka	Sunil	Dileep, Khushboo, Harisree Ashokan ,Jayaram	
Aavarthanam			
Manthrikante Pravukal	Vijayakrishnan	Madhu, Shivaji	
Mini	P. Chandrakumar;	Aarati Ghanashyam, Chandrahasan, Kuckoo Parameswaran (subscription required);	Iskantar Mirsa
Manasatranjante Diary			

== Dubbed films ==
Title	Director	Story
Silpi		
Hai Sundary	Raghavendra Rao	
M/S Big Boss	Kothanda Rama Reddy	
Ini Oru Pranayakatha	Raghavendra	
Nishkarsha	Sunilkumar Desai	
Crime	Sukumar	
