= Bobby Kottarakkara =

Indian actor (1952 - 2000)

- Born: Abdul Azeez; 11 March 1952; Kottarakkara, Kerala, India
- Died: 2 December 2000 (aged 48); Thiruvananthapuram, Kerala, India
- Other name: Abdul Azeez
- Occupation: Actor
- Years active: 1975-2000
- Parent: Pareedkunju Ravuthar

Abdul Azeez (11 March 1952 – 2 December 2000), Better known by his Stage Name Bobby Kottarakkara was an Indian actor who acted in Malayalam films. He was born to Pareedkunju Ravuthar in Kottarakkara. He began his acting career on stage. He made his film debut with Mucheettukalikkaarante Makal. Bobby soon became a well-known actor. He performed in around 300 roles in a variety of films, including: Mazhavilkavadi, Kannezhuthi Pottum Thottu, Golanthara Vartha, Kaazhchakkappuram and Chithram. He also acted in several TV serials.

It was during the filming of Vakkalathu Narayanankutty that Bobby died of a massive asthma heart attack in December 2000. The film had Jayaram and Mukesh in the main roles and was released a few months after his death.

== Filmography ==
Year	Title	Role	Notes
1975	Mucheettukalikkarante Makal		
1980	Palattu Kunjikannan	Drummer boy	
1981	Veliyattam	Appu	
1982	Aakrosham	Mohanachandran's brother	
1982	Kazhumaram		
1983	Naseema		
1984	Kadamattathachan	Thirumeni's Karyasthan	
1985	Uyirthezhunnelppu	Chanthu	
1985	Saandham Bheekaram	Pattaru	
1985	Mutharamkunnu P.O.	Ramanan	
1985	Aram + Aram Kinnaram	Waiter at the restaurant	
1985	Boeing Boeing	Tea Shop Owner	
1985	Akkare Ninnoru Maran	Singer	
1985	Ee Sabdam Innathe Sabdam	Hospital patient	
1986	Dheem Tharikida Thom		
1986	Ninnistham Ennishtam		
1987	Kottum Kuravayum		
1987	Neeyallengil Njan	Kuttappan	
1987	Theekattu	Susheelan	
1987	Swargam		
1987	Naradhan Keralathil	Appukuttan	
1987	Nadodikkattu	House Broker	
1988	Oru Muthassi Katha	Varghese	
1988	Evidence	Convict	
1988	Captain Sharma		
1988	Chithram	Marriage Broker	
1989	Varavelpu	Pappan	
1989	Carnivel	Peethambaran	
1989	Ivalente Kamuki		
1989	Peruvannapurathe Visheshangal		
1989	Vadakku Nooki Yanthram	Sahadevan	
1989	Layanam		
1989	Mazhavilkavadi	Murukan	
1989	Devadas	School Teacher	
1989	Chakkikotha Chankaran	Sankara Pillai	
1990	Crime Branch		
1990	Minda Poochakku Kalyanam	Podiyan Pillai	
1990	Sankaran Kuttikku Pennu Venam		
1990	Vidhyarambham	Raghavan	
1990	Champion Thomas	Paramu	
1990	Aaraam Waardil Aabhyanthara Kalaham		
1991	Sandesham	Uthaman	
1991	Nattuvishesham		
1991	Nettippattom	Damu (Madantha)	
1991	Kilukkampetti	Lazar	
1991	Cheppu Kilukkunna Changathi	Ramakrishnan	
1991	Apoorvam Chilar		
1991	Raagam Anuragam		
1991	Mahazar	Babu	
1991	Orutharam Randutharam Moonnutharam		
1991	Ennum Nanmakal	Ramachandran	
1991	Bharatham	Kunjunni	
1991	Kakkathollayiram	Pushkaran	
1991	Kalari		
1991	Thudar Katha	Tonga rider	
1991	Aval Ariyathe	Kuttan Pilla	
1991	Kadinjool Kalyanam	Sankaran	
1991	Post Box No. 27		
1991	Ottayal Pattalam	Makeup man	
1992	Kaazhchakkppuram	Abubakkar	
1992	First Bell	Insane Man	
1992	Welcome to Kodaikanal	Kunjachan	
1992	Valayam		
1992	Aardram	Teastall owner	
1992	Snehasagaram	Chellappan	
1992	Ezhara Ponnana	Sathyan	
1993	Cheppadividya		
1993	Vakkeel Vasudev	Lambodharan	
1993	Golanthara Vartha	Sahadevan	
1993	Bandhukkal Sathrukkal	Ramakrishnan	
1993	Sakshal Sreeman Chathunni	Police Constable	
1993	Sowbhagyam	Uppala Rajappan	
1993	Paithrukam		
1993	Pravachakan	Daniel	
1993	Injakkadan Mathai & Sons		
1993	Eeswaramurthi In		
1994	Chanakya Soothrangal	Sreekumar	
1994	Vadhu Doctoranu	Sivaraman	
1994	CID Unnikrishnan B.A., B.Ed.	Eraniel Chinnappa	
1994	Njan Kodiswaran	Astrologer Krishna Panicker	
1994	Kambolam		
1994	Chukkan	Koyakka	
1994	Chakoram	Govindankutty	
1994	Vardhakya Puranam		
1994	The City	Basheer	
1994	Manathe Kottaram	Cinematographer	
1994	Vendor Daniel State Licency	Kunjiraman	
1994	Kashmeeram	Kuttan Chatterji	
1994	Minnaram	Michael	
1994	Rudraksham	Hospital Attendant	
1994	Malappuram Haji Mahanaya Joji		
1994	Kinnaripuzhayoram		
1995	Karma		
1995	Achan Rajavu Appan Jethavu		
1995	Tom & Jerry		
1995	Parvathy Parinayam	Thorappan Vasu	
1995	No. 1 Snehatheeram Bangalore North		
1995	Sindhoora Rekha	Gouthaman	
1995	Kalyanji Anandji	Madhavan Nair	
1995	Manikya Chempazhukka	Veerapandya Mallan	
1995	Kidilol Kidilam	Balaraman	
1996	Naalaamkettile Nalla Thampimaar		
1996	Pallivaathukkal Thommichan	Kuttynarayanan	
1996	Harbour	Vaasu	
1996	Aramana Veedum Anjoorekkarum	Muniyandi	
1997	Nagarapuranam		
1997	Kalyana Unnikal		
1997	Mannadiar Penninu Chenkotta Checkan	Komalan	
1997	Vamsam		
1997	Manikya Koodaram		
1997	Aaraam Thampuran	Guest House Assistant	
1997	Adivaram		
1997	Katha Nayakan	Sadasivan Nair	
1997	Janathipathyam	Cherian Issac	
1998	Pranayavarnagal		
1998	Manthrikumaran		
1998	Mattupetti Machan		
1998	The Truth		Cameo
1998	Mayilpeelikkavu		
1998	Anuragakottaram	Kolliyan	
1998	Magician Mahendralal from Delhi	Velayudhan	
1998	Aalibabayum Aarara Kallanmarum	Police Constable Kuruvila	
1998	Kottaram Veettile Apputtan	Vakkachan	
1999	My Dear Karadi		
1999	Kannezhuthi Pottum Thottu		
1999	Varsha		
1999	Janani	Kuttichan	
1999	Njangal Santhushtaranu	Govindan	
1999	Pattabhishekam	Vishnunarayanan's brother-in-law	
1999	Captain	Kuttappan	
1999	Njangal Santhushtaranu	Policeman	
2000	Priyankari		
2000	Varavayi		
2000	Pilots	Dinakaran	
2000	The Warrant	HC Pisharody	
2001	Ladies & Gentleman		
2001	Ennu Sambavami Yuge Yuge		
2001	Vakkalathu Narayanankutty	Captain Bobby	
2002	Videsi Nair Swadesi Nair	Ujwalan	
2002	Desam	Kunjunni	
2004	Thekkekkara Superfast	Thampan	
