= Kottarakkara (disambiguation) =

Kottarakkara is a town in Kollam district.

Kottarakkara may also refer to:

- Bobby Kottarakkara, Malayalam Indian actor (1952–2000)
- Kottarakkara (also known as Kottarakkara Sreedharan Nair), Malayalam Indian actor (1922–1986)
