= Harisree Ashokan =

Indian actor, director, and impressionist (born 1964)

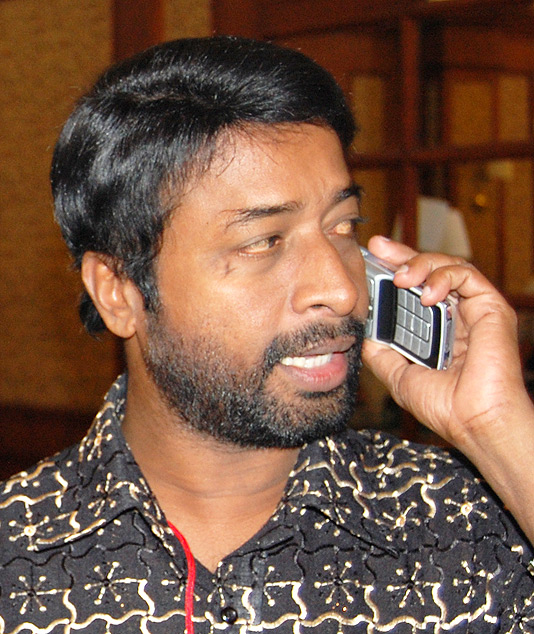
- Born: 6 April 1964 (age 62); Kochi, Kerala, India
- Occupations: Film actor, Director
- Years active: 1986 – present
- Spouse: Preetha
- Children: Arjun Ashokan, Sreekutty Ashokan
- Parent(s): Kunjappu, Janaki

Harisree Ashokan (born 6 April 1964) is an Indian actor and director who is known for his comedy roles in Malayalam films. Ashokan has acted in more than 200 Malayalam films. He started his career as a mimicry artist in the troupe Harisree and then worked in Kalabhavan.

== Early life ==
Ashokan (nicknamed Babu) was born as the sixth child among ten children to the late Kunjappan and late Janaki on 6 April 1964, in Ernakulam, Kerala. His siblings include the late Raveendran, the late Sasindran, Mohanan, Anil, Sunil, Santha, Vimala, and the late Sujatha. He had his primary education from MIHS Ernakulam. After tenth, he joined Kuyilin's Cochin Kalavedi. He holds a diploma in Telecom Engineering from Ernakulam, Kerala. He found work as an assistant lineman in 1984 with the telecom department in Kochi, Kerala. He worked there until 1987 when he became an electric lineman.

== Career ==
While working at the telecom department, Ashokan joined Kalabhavan and worked for 6 years and later moved to Harisree, after which he began to be called "Harisree Ashokan". His elder brother was also a telecom officer.

Asokan was always interested in acting and had been an amateur theatre actor. He got his first break with the movie Parvathy Parinayam directed by P.G. Viswambharan where he played the role of a beggar.

Ashokan made his screen debut in the 1986 movie Pappan Priyappetta Pappan. He played several roles in the next few years. His role in Parvathy Parinayam gave his first breakthrough in Malayalam cinema. He acted in around ten movies in 1994 after acting in Parvathy Parinayam. In the movie Vrudhanmare Sookshikkuka in 1994, he played one of the lead roles alongside Dileep, with whom Ashokan eventually formed one of the most celebrated comedy pairs in Malayalam film industry throughout his career.

In the 1998 movie Punjabi House, Ashokan played the character Ramanan. Many consider this as the best performance by Harishree Ashokan of his career. Dileep-Harishree Ashokan duo's another hit movie is Ee Parakkum Thalika, which was released in 2001; in this movie, he played the role of Sundaran. He played the character of Sugunan in the 2002 movie Meesha Madhavan, which became the highest grossing Malayalam movie of the year. Harishree Ashokan's most famous roles in his career came out in 2003. In the slapsick comedy C.I.D. Moosa, he played the role of Thorappan Kochunni, and in the movie Pulival Kalyanam, he played the role of Theeppori Kuttappan. He played the character Krishankutty in Thilakkam. His role as Ugran in the movie Chronic Bachelor was also appreciated by the audience. All these films were major blockbusters in 2003. In the 2005 Malayalam movie Boyy Friennd, Ashokan played the villain role for the first time in his career.

Dileep and Harishree Ashokan are regarded as a popular comedy pair in Malayalam cinema of the 90s and early 2000s. The duo have acted together in plenty of movies. Vriddanmarund Sookshikkuga, Punjabi House, Ee Parakkum Thalika, Meesa Madhavan, C.I.D Moosa, Thilakkam, Runway, Kochi Rajavu, Pandippada, Crazy Gopalan, Chess, Kuberan, Kaaryastan are some among the major movies among them.

Ashokan made his directional debut through the 2019 movie An International Local Story.

== Personal life ==
He is married to Preetha. The couple has two children, Sreekutty and Malayalam film actor Arjun Ashokan.

== Filmography ==
=== As actor ===
Key
†	Denotes films that have not yet been released

==== 1980s ====
Year	Film	Role	Notes
1986	Pappan Priyappetta Pappan		Debut film

==== 1990s ====
Year	Film	Role	Notes
1991	Godfather	Anjooran's houseboy	
1992	First Bell	Mental Patient	
1992	Chevalier Michael		
1993	Ammayane Sathyam		
1993	Vakkeel Vasudev		
1993	Porutham	Gulumalu Jamal	
1993	Sakshal Sreeman Chathunni	Bhaskaran	
1994	Kudumba Visesham	Abubacker	
1994	Vadhu Doctoranu	Snake charmer	
1994	Manathe Kottaram	Balan	
1995	Parvathy Parinayam	Beggar	
1995	Keerthanam		
1995	Kokkarakko	Servant	
1995	Three Men Army	Susheelan	
1995	Achan Raajavu Appan Jethavu	Dushyantharaj	
1995	Alancheri Thamprakkal	Haridas	
1995	Kalamasseriyil Kalyanayogam		
1995	Kalyanji Anandji	Anantharaman	
1995	Mimics Action 500		
1995	Vrudhanmare Sookshikkuka	Dharmaraj / Daniel M D'Souza	
1995	Tom & Jerry		
1995	Sindoora Rekha	Oommachan	
1995	Mannar Mathai Speaking	Sandhyavu	
1996	Kaathil Oru Kinnaram	John Samuel	
1996	Kanchanam	Easho	
1996	Kalyana Sowgandhikam	Bahuleyan	
1996	Kumkumacheppu		
1996	Kanjirapally Kariyachan		
1996	Padanayakan		
1996	Manthrika Kuthira		
1996	Nandagopalnte Kusruthikal		
1996	Kudumbakodathi	Sarathy Kumaran	
1996	Aramana Veedum Anjoorekkarum	Rajappan	
1996	Kinnam Katta Kallan		
1996	Harbour	Usman	
1996	Mr. Clean	Iymootty	
1996	Malayaalamaasam Chingam Onninu	Kochuraman	
1996	Ee Puzhayum Kadannu	Ramankutty	
1997	Mannadiar Penninu Chenkotta Checkan	Aromal	
1997	Arjunan Pillayum Anchu Makkalum	Thankakkuttan	
1997	Ishtadanam	M.K. Maniyan	
1997	Aniyathipraavu	Chippayi	
1997	Moonnu Kodiyum Munnooru Pavanum	Kondotty	
1997	Poothumbiyum Poovalanmarum	Charlie	
1997	The Good Boys	Kunjandi	
1997	Hitler Brothers	Bhakthavalsalan	
1997	Ikkareyanente Manasam	Thankappan	
1997	Oru Mutham Manimutham	Kumaran	
1998	Gramapanchayath	Swa. Le	
1998	Nakshatratharattu	Darling Hariharan	
1998	Amma Ammayiamma	Premachandran	
1998	Kallu Kondoru Pennu	Antappan	
1998	Mayajalam	Manivarnnan	
1998	Punjabi House	Ramanan	
1999	Deepasthambham Mahascharyam	Aliyar	
1999	Jananayakan	Dominic	
1999	Chandamama	Bhaskaran	
1999	Onnam Vattom Kandappol		
1999	Bharya Veettil Paramasukham	Shiyami	
1999	Pattabhishekam	Bhairavan	
1999	Auto Brothers	Pappan	
1999	Pranaya Nilavu	Mathai	
1999	Charlie Chaplin	Bheeman	
1999	Udayapuram Sulthan	Augustine	
1999	Tokyo Nagarathile Viseshangal	Vikram Bolaram Singh	

==== 2000s ====
Year	Film	Role	Notes
2000	Sathyam Sivam Sundaram	Vijayan	
2000	Nadan Pennum Natupramaniyum	Pachu	
2000	Aanamuttathe Aangalamar	Ramanan	
2000	Millennium Stars		
2000	Ee Mazha Thenmazha		
2000	Melevaryathe Malakhakkuttikal		
2000	Vinayapoorvam Vidhyaadharan	Punyalan	
2000	Mera Naam Joker		
2000	Varavay		
2000	Kattu Vannu Vilichappol	Velappan	
2001	Aaraam Jaalakam		
2001	Rakshasa Rajavu	Pathrose	
2001	Nakshathragal Parayathirunnathu	Shashankan	
2001	Meghasandesam	Kuttikrishnan	
2001	Naranathu Thampuran	Sadan	
2001	House Owner		
2001	Prnayamanthram		
2001	Nagaravadhu		
2001	Andolanam		
2001	Sharja To Sharja	Lohi	
2001	Ee Parakkum Thalika	Sundaresan M. K	
2001	Sundara Purushan	Philipose	
2002	Savithriyude Aranjanam	Neelakandan	
2002	Pranayamanithooval	Ponnappan	
2002	Oomappenninu Uriyadappayyan	Kochu Kuttan	
2002	Kuberan	Theyyunni	
2002	www.anukudumbam.com		
2002	Kayamkulam Kanaran		
2002	Pakalpooram	Ayyappankutty	
2002	Kattuchembakam	Antappan	
2002	Kaiyethum Doorath	Appunni	
2002	Jagathy Jagadeesh in Town	Udakku Chempakaraman	
2002	Bamboo Boys	Nakki	
2002	Meesa Madhavan	Sugunan	
2003	Varum Varunnu Varunnu		
2003	Thillana Thillana	Govind	
2003	Chronic Bachelor	Ugran	
2003	Thilakkam	Krishnan Kutty	
2003	C.I.D. Moosa	Thurappan Kochunni	
2003	Achante Kochumolkku	Anthappan	
2003	Balettan	Manikandan	
2003	Melvilasam Sariyanu	Pushkaran	
2003	Valathottu Thirinjal Nalamathe Veedu	Suresh	
2003	Pulival Kalyanam	Theeppori Kuttappan	
2004	Kerala House Udan Vilpanakku	Vallabhan	
2004	C. I. Mahadevan 5 Adi 4 Inchu	Dasappan	
2004	Vismayathumbathu	Gopan	
2004	Thalamelam	Guinness Gopalan	
2004	Kusruthi	Kumaran	
2004	Vajram	Achu	
2004	Thekkekkara Superfast	Bhairavan	
2004	Runway	Porinchu	
2004	Mampazhakkalam	Sulaiman	
2005	Otta Nanayam	Paramu	
2005	Junior Senior	Jeeva	
2005	Bus Conductor	Gangadharan	
2005	Kalyanakurimanam		
2005	Lokanathan IAS	Ajayan	
2005	Iruvattam Manavaatti	Susheelan	
2005	Hridayathil Sookshikkan	Mathen	
2005	Kochi Rajavu	Komalan	
2005	Ben Johnson	Constable Swami	
2005	Pandippada	Bhasi	
2005	Boyy Friennd	Thankappan	
2006	Madhuchandralekha	Digambaran	
2006	Moonnamathoral	Divakaran	
2006	Baba Kalyani		
2006	Lion	Kannan	
2006	Parayam		
2006	Chacko Randaaman	Usman	
2006	Thuruppugulan	Shathru	
2006	Kilukkam Kilukilukkam	Ponnappan	
2006	Chess	Kallan Bhaskaran	
2007	Changathipoocha	Aishwaryan	
2007	Inspector Garud	Kuttappan	
2007	Athisayan	S.P Damodaran	
2007	Aakasham	Manoharan	
2007	Black Cat	Caesar	
2007	Rock n' Roll	Balu	
2007	Nagaram	Parashuraman	
2007	Janmam		
2007	Kangaroo	Pappachan	
2007	Ottakkayyan	Ottakkayyan Vasu	
2007	Mouryan		
2007	Sooryan		
2008	Bullet		
2008	Kabadi Kabadi	Biju	
2008	Swarnam		
2008	Annan Thampi	Chandran	
2008	College Kumaran	Valsan	
2008	Twenty:20	Poottu Varkey	
2008	Crazy Gopalan	Harishchandran	
2009	Moz & Cat	Ajayan	
2009	Kancheepurathe Kalyanam	P.M. Premachandran	
2009	Banaras	Paul	
2009	Chemistry	Varghese	
2009	Vairam: Fight For Justice	Sugunan	
2009	Passenger	Varghese	
2009	Rahasya Police	Arjunan	
2009	Swantham Lekhakan	Dasan	
2009	Bharya Swantham Suhruthu		
2009	Utharaswayamvaram	Sarassappan	
2009	Colours	Gopi	
2009	Loudspeaker	Kathanar	

==== 2010s ====
Year	Title	Role	Notes
2010	Body Guard	Neelambaran	
2010	Valiyangadi		
2010	In Ghost House Inn	Ernest	
2010	Janakan	Pazhani	
2010	Advocate Lakshmanan – Ladies Only	Broker Sathyavan	
2010	Neelambari	Sundaran	
2010	Kaaryasthan	Kumaran	
2010	Holidays	Thangappan	
2010	Swantham Bharya Zindabad	Uthaman	
2010	Puthumukhangal	Member Mani	
2011	August 15	Chackochan	
2011	Christian Brothers	Krishnankutty	
2011	Maharaja Talkies		
2011	Lucky Jokers	Vijayan	
2011	Uppukandam Brothers: Back in Action	Aakri' Shaji	
2011	Manushyamrugam	Advocate Shamsuddin Valiyaveettil	
2011	Orma Mathram		
2011	Swapna Sanchari	Rameshan	
2011	Bombay Mittayi	Sulaiman	
2011	Snehadaram		
2012	Orkut Oru Ormakoot	Narayanan	
2012	Asuravithu	Father Mullu Murikan	
2012	Kunjaliyan	Veeramani	
2012	Mullassery Madhavan Kutty Nemom P. O.	Shashankan Pravachambalam	
2012	Vaadhyar		
2012	Perinoru Makan		
2012	MLA Mani: Patham Classum Gusthiyum	Pushkaran	
2012	Doctor Innocentanu	Pookkoya	
2012	Prabhuvinte Makkal		
2012	Scene onnu Nammude Veedu	Bhasi	
2012	Oru Kudumba Chithram	Gopikuttan	
2012	Bavuttiyude Namathil	Alavi	
2013	Radio	Jhonson	
2013	Pigman	Thimmayyan	
2013	Blackberry	Madhavan	
2013	Kadal Kadannoru Mathukkutty	Rafi	
2013	Pullipulikalum Aattinkuttiyum	Susheelan	
2013	Geethaanjali	Fake Swami	
2013	Ezhu Sundara Rathrikal	Abid	
2014	Aamayum Muyalum	Mayilappa	
2014	To Let Ambadi Talkies		
2015	3 Wicketinu 365 Runs		
2016	Thoppil Joppan	Poulose	
2017	Honey Bee 2: Celebrations	Kappal Ory	
2017	Role Models	Ramanan	Cameo
2017	Honey Bee 2.5	Himself	
2017	Parava	Habeeba	
2018	Oru Pazhaya Bomb Kadha	Kumaran Asan	
2018	Daivame Kaithozham K. Kumar Akanam	Doctor	
2018	Theneechayum Peerankippadayum		
2019	Ilayaraja	Ganapathy	
2019	An International Local Story	Ayyappan Nair	

==== 2020s ====
Year	Title	Role	Notes
2021	Minnal Murali	Dasan	
2021	Keshu Ee Veedinte Nadhan	Kunjikrishnan	
2022	Priyan Ottathilanu	Kuppi Rajan	
2022	Hasyam	Cadaver agent	
2023	Kunjamminis Hospital	Pappachan	
2023	Maharani	Anirudhan	
2023	A Ranjith Cinema	Shashankan	
2024	Anweshippin Kandethum	Postman Chandran	
2025	Rekhachithram	Gopinath	
2025	Aabhyanthara Kuttavaali	Makkar	
2025	Kerala Crime Files 2	Ayyappan	Disney+ Hotstar web series
2025	Paathirathri	SI Rasheed	
2026	Magic Mushrooms	Shakespeare Gopalankutty	
2026	Prathichaya	Purushothaman	
2026	Ottam Thullal †	TBA	
TBA	1 Princess Street †	TBA	

=== As director ===
Year	Film	Role	Language	Notes
2019	An International Local Story	Ayyappan Nair	Malayalam	Directorial debut
