= Ammayane Sathyam =

1993 film by Balachandra Menon

Ammayana Sathyam
- VCD cover
- Directed by: Balachandra Menon
- Written by: Balachandra Menon
- Produced by: Krishna Sasidharan
- Starring: Mukesh; Annie; Balachandra Menon; Narendra Prasad; Jagathy Sreekumar; Ganesh Kumar; Thilakan; K. P. A. C. Lalitha; Paravoor Bharathan; Prem Kumar; Mamukkoya
- Cinematography: Dinesh Babu
- Edited by: G. Murali
- Music by: M. G. Radhakrishnan; Vijay Shankar
- Production company: Chandni Films
- Distributed by: Gloria Films
- Release date: 1993
- Running time: 130 minutes
- Country: India
- Language: Malayalam

Ammayane Sathyam (അമ്മയാണെ സത്യം, English: I Swear on my Mother) is a 1993 Malayalam film written and directed by Balachandra Menon. The film stars Mukesh, Annie, Balachandra Menon, Narendra Prasad, Jagathy Sreekumar, Ganesh Kumar, Thilakan, K. P. A. C. Lalitha, Paravoor Bharathan, Prem Kumar, and Mammukoya. Balachendra Menon remade the film in Tamil as Kandaen Seethayae, however the project was later shelved. He also introduced actress Annie through this film.

== Plot ==
Fifteen-year-old Parvathi, the heiress to her father’s wealth, witnesses her family being murdered by Jaganatha Varma. She escapes to save her life. To avoid being caught, she disguises herself as a boy named Thomas and begins working as a househelp in a police inspector’s home. When the inspector is transferred to her hometown, she flees again and finds work in a house where three unmarried young men live. There, she takes on the name Rama.

One day, one of the men, Omanakuttan, discovers that Rama is actually a girl. After hearing her story, Omanakuttan and his friends decide to help her. Just as Jaganatha Varma is about to kill her, Policeman S. Narayanan uncovers his plan and rescues Parvathi

== Cast ==
- Mukesh as Omanakuttan
- Annie as Parvathi / Thomas / Ramkumar Chengammanad a.k.a. Raman
- Balachandra Menon as Sub Inspector [S.I]S. Narayanan
- Narendra Prasad as Jaganatha Varma
- Jagathi Sreekumar as Pisharadi
- K. B. Ganesh Kumar as Cherian
- Paravoor Bharathan as Iyer
- Karamana Janardanan Nair as Chandradas, Omanakuttan's Father
- K. P. A. C. Lalitha as Omanakuttan's Mother
- Prem Kumar as Sreeni
- Mamukkoya as Mujeeb Rahman
- Babu Namboothiri as Sathyanath, Parvathi's Father
- Renuka as Parvathi's Mother
- Shyama
- Thilakan as R. Varghese Mathew
- Harisree Asokan
- Kaithapram Damodaran Namboothiri as Nampoothiri
- Chithra as Margret
- Usharani as Jaganatha Varma's wife
