= Puthukkottayile Puthumanavalan =

- Directed by: Rafi–Mecartin
- Story by: Rafi–Mecartin
- Produced by: Appachan
- Starring: Jayaram; Prem Kumar; Captain Raju; Annie
- Cinematography: Anandakuttan
- Edited by: K. P. Hariharaputhran
- Music by: S. P. Venkatesh
- Production company: New Saga Films
- Distributed by: New Saga Films
- Release date: 20 July 1995
- Country: India
- Language: Malayalam

Puthukkottayile Puthumanavalan is a 1995 Indian Malayalam-language family drama written & directed by Rafi–Mecartin (in their directorial debut). The film stars Jayaram, Prem Kumar, Captain Raju, and Annie in the lead roles.The film has musical score by S. P. Venkatesh. The film was a commercial success.

== Plot ==
Ganabhooshanam Gireesh Cochin and Ganabhooshanam Satheesh Cochin are two friends who run an unsuccessful kadhaprasangam troupe, thus are struggling to make ends meet. They spend their time working on new stories, trying to get hired or spying on a group of girls who live next door. Their antics irk the girls, especially ringleader Anita, who wants to teach them a lesson. They try to trick the men into thinking two of the girls are in love with them, leading them on a wild goose chase. While Satheesh figures out the truth, Gireesh begins to believe that one of the girls, Geethu, is in love with him.

Geethu is a soft spoken girl who hails from the village of Puthukotta, where two families, Madassery and Palathara, are bitter rivals. They are also Geethu's paternal and maternal families respectively, who fight in her name as well. Pillai, the caretaker of the families, visits Geethu while trying to hire a performer for their village festival, none of whom are willing to come to Puthukotta due to its deadly reputation. The girls, seeing an opportunity, convince Pillai to hire Gireesh and Satheesh for a performance in the village, intending to get them beaten, much to Geethu's worry. Gireesh jumps on the opportunity after learning that it is Geethu's village, and the men travel along with the girls to Puthukotta.

At Puthukotta, Kochuthambi, Geethu's paternal uncle, gets into a fight with Palunni and Sreedharanunni, her maternal uncles, while they all try to convince Geethu to come to their respective homes. The girls goad Gireesh and Satheesh to step in help, and Gireesh does so hoping to impress Geethu. This brings them into the attention of the feuding families, in order to know their true intentions, send two of their respective goons to spy on them. After Gireesh tells Pillai that he and Geethu are in love, Pillai tells them about Geethu's past. Geethu's father, Madassery Thampi, was beloved and respected man in their village, and both the families lived in unison. But one day, a man named Ananthan came to Puthukotta claiming to be the illegitimate son of Thampi. This accusation caused trouble between the families. In the process, Ananthan is supposedly killed and Thampi gets arrested. But it becomes clear that Thampi was framed by someone close, and suspicions led to Madassery and Palathara becoming rivals.

Presently, Thampi has escaped from jail and is rumoured to be coming for this year's festival to find the person who betrayed him, thus the police are keeping a strong watch in Puthukotta. Govindan, Thampi's friend and lawyer, warns Geethu about people willing to harm her as well. Meanwhile Satheesh and Gireesh are attacked by the Madassery and Palathara families after hearing him saying about his love to Pillai. To save themselves, Satheesh and Gireesh lie that they are here to tell the story of Madassery Thampi and reveal the person who betrayed him, much to everyone's shock.

Gireesh and Satheesh find themselves in bigger trouble, as both the Madassery and Palathara families try to convince and then force them to tell a story which paints their respective rivals as the villains. Despite everything, Gireesh adamantly stays for Geethu's sake, which finally forces Geethu to reveal that everything that happened was a trick played by Anita and the girls to teach them a lesson. Despite being heartbroken and angry, Gireesh and Satheesh accept their errors, revealing that they are actually orphans who are struggling to make a livelihood with the only art they know, and everything they did was a way of trying to escape their sad lives. They apologize and leave, while the girls finally realize that they may have gone too far with their joke.

Gireesh and Satheesh's attempt to leave backfires as the people of Puthukotta forcefully bring them back, wanting to hear Thampi's story. Taking responsibility, the girls and Pillai decide to help the men escape by creating a distraction and smuggling the men out inside sacks. As they are about to go, Anita hands over a rose to Gireesh, revealing to him that Geethu has actually fallen in love with him, much to his happiness. Pillai and his sidekick Kunjikrishnan manage to get the men on a boat going away from Puthukotta. But just when they think they have escaped, Gireesh and Satheesh are confronted by a man, who reveals himself to be Madassery Thampi, to their horror. Having overheard and seen their shenanigans, Thampi now wants Gireesh and Satheesh's help in proving his innocence, which they hesitatingly accept.

While everybody is looking for them, Gireesh and Satheesh enigmatically return to Puthukotta, now with a full troupe, dead set to tell their story, much to the shock of Geethu. Through their story, Gireesh and Satheesh narrate how Ananthan came to Puthukotta claiming to be Thampi's son, and after his accusations, the Palathara family protected him, believing Thampi cheated their sister. But Thampi takes Ananthan away from Palathara, after which Ananthan goes missing. Word begins to spread that Thampi killed Ananthan, and police begin to look for him. Thampi, who only exiled Ananthan from Puthukotta, is forced to go into hiding, but is eventually caught. While the Palathara family tries to get Thampi arrested, Govindan tries to rescue him by forging evidence, but the plan fails when someone betrays them and Thampi is arrested. Through their story, Gireesh and Satheesh point fingers at mutiple possible suspects, including Pillai, Kochuthampi, Palunni and Sreedharanunni, until they finally reveal who actually betrayed Madassery Thampi.

It is revealed that the true mastermind behind the whole plot is Govindan himself. Ananthan is actually John Sakaria, a criminal whom Govindan once helped, who along with Govindan, played a trick to get rid of Thampi, so that Govindan can usurp his properties and wealth. Gireesh and Satheesh present the alive and well John Sakaria as proof of Govindan's fraud and Thampi's innocence. Govindan however uses goons to beat up Gireesh and Satheesh, as well as the now united Madassery and Palathara families, and escape, but he is captured by Thampi, who had discovered the truth and asked Gireesh and Satheesh to help prove his innocence. The police stop Thampi before he can kill Govindan, and arrest Govindan, exonerating Thampi.

With the truth revealed and all the problems solved, Gireesh and Satheesh decide to finish their first successful story. Through it, they also express Gireesh's affection for Geethu, which a grateful Thampi wholeheartedly accepts. Gireesh and Geethu happily unite while everyone cheerfully celebrates a happy ending, breaking the fourth wall to thank the audience as well.

== Cast ==
- Jayaram as Ganabhooshanam Gireesh Cochin
- Prem Kumar as Ganabhooshanam Satheesh Cochin
- Annie as Geethu
- Captain Raju as Madassery Thampi
- Jagathy Sreekumar as Madassery Kochuthampi
- Janardhanan as Palathara Palunni
- Spadikam George as Palathara Sreedharanunni
- Rajan P Dev as Govindan Vakeel
- Innocent as Pillai
- Mala Aravindan as Varkey
- Sainuddin as Sub inspector Idiyan Velayudhan
- Machan Varghese as Kaleri Velunni
- V. D. Rajappan as Gurukal
- Kunchan as Kungfoo Vasu
- Vettukilli Prakashan as Kunjikrishnan
- Krishnakumar as Ananthan/John Sakaria
- Vinduja Menon as Anitha
- Prasitha as Sumathi
- Kanakalatha as Bhanumathi
- Aranmula Ponnamma as Achamma

== Production ==
This film marked the first character role of Captain Raju and the debut of Irshad Ali. The film was also a turning point in the career of Prem Kumar. The filming was held at Villa De Parari, a mansion located at Ezhupunna, Alappuzha district.

== Soundtrack ==
The music was composed by S. P. Venkatesh and the lyrics were written by S. Ramesan Nair, (I.S Kundoor).

No.	Song	Singers	Lyrics
1	"Aaru Paranjaalum"	K. J. Yesudas, Biju Narayanan, and K. Prabhakar	S. Ramesan Nair
2	"Thankakkolussil"	Biju Narayanan and Sujatha Mohan	(I. S. Kundoor)
3	"Oru Vellithaambalam"	Biju Narayanan and Krishnakumar / Krishnachandran	(I. S. Kundoor)
4	"Janimrithikal"		(I. S. Kundoor / S. Ramesan Nair)
5	"Thankakkolussil [F]"	Sujatha Mohan	(I. S. Kundoor)

== Reception ==
In a retrospective review of five of Jayaram's funny films, Meera Venugopal of Gaana of wrote, "The energetic performance delivered by Jayaram and Prem Kumar makes this movie a laugh riot". Rafi and Jayaram discussed the possibility of a sequel during a television special on the latter on Amrita TV.
