= Swapna Lokathe Balabhaskaran =

- Directed by: Rajasenan
- Written by: Reghunath Paleri; Rajasenan
- Produced by: Maharaja Sivanandan
- Starring: Jayaram; Annie; Paravoor Ramachandran; K.P.A.C.Lalitha
- Cinematography: Venu
- Edited by: G. Murali
- Music by: S. P. Venkatesh
- Release date: 11 April 1996
- Country: India
- Language: Malayalam

Swapnalokathe Balabhaskaran (transl. Balabhaskaran of dreamland) is a 1996 Indian Malayalam-language comedy-drama film directed by Rajasenan, starring Jayaram and Annie Shaji Kailas.

== Plot ==
Balabhaskaran has somnambulism. He walks long distances in the night, and many mishaps happen because of this. He is blamed for a murder by his friend, Johnnie, who wants to extort money from Balabhaskaran by blackmailing him. Balabhaskaran's father marries him off to Chandrika in the hope that this will help him get over his sleepwalking.

Later, Balabhaskaran is involved in an accident and believing he is on his deathbed, tells Chandrika that he was living the life of a womanizer before marriage. Luckily, or unluckily, Balabhaskaran survives, but Chandrika is not willing to forget what he told her about his previous life. This creates problems in their married life.

== Cast ==
- Jayaram as Balabhaskaran
- Annie as Chandrika
- Anju Aravind as Mohini
- Paravoor Ramachandran as Kaimal
- K.P.A.C. Lalitha as Bhageerathi
- Janardhanan as Sadasivn
- Dileep as Car driver Keshavankutty
- Indrans as Kunjunni
- Madhupal as Johnnie
- Zeenath as Sadasivan's wife
- Krishna Prasad as Manoj
- K. T. S. Padannayil as Balabhaskaran's grandfather
- Baburaj
- Kozhikode Narayanan Nair as Chandrashekhara Kaimal
