= Kochaniyan =

- Directed by: Satheesh Venganoor
- Produced by: Bushura Shahudeen
- Release date: 1994
- Country: India
- Language: Malayalam

Kochaniyan is a 1994 Indian Malayalam film. It was the first film directed by Satheesh Venganoor. Films tells a Kerala family story through the eyes of the young protagonist Kochunni (Vineeth). In 1994, the film received National Film Award for Best Children's Film.

== Cast ==
- Master Vineeth
- Narendra Prasad
- Maya Uthradamthirunal
- A. Shahudeen
- Baby Surendran
- Master Vishnu Prasad
- Master Anoop RS
- Master Anil Lele
