= Alif (2015 film) =

- Theatrical release poster
- Directed by: N. K. Muhammed Koya
- Written by: N. K. Muhammed Koya
- Screenplay by: N. K. Muhammed Koya
- Produced by: M. S. Biju
- Starring: Lena, Zeenath, Kalabhavan Mani
- Cinematography: M. J. Radhakrishnan
- Edited by: B. Ajith Kumar
- Music by: Ramesh Narayan
- Distributed by: Mahadeva Cinemas
- Release date: 27 February 2015
- Country: India
- Language: Malayalam

Alif is a 2015 Indian Malayalam-language film directed by N. K. Muhammed Koya.

== Awards ==
- 2015 Kerala Film Critics Association Awards for upcoming director - NK Muhammed Koya
- 2015 (Kerala Film Critics Association Award) for Film ALIF
- 2015 17th John Abraham Special Jury mention for Film ALIF
- 2015 2nd Adoor Bhasi Award for Best Film ALIF
- 2015 1st Madhu Kaithapram Award for Debut Director

== Cast ==
- Lena as Fathima
- Zeenath as Aatta
- Kalabhavan Mani as Chandran
- Nedumudi Venu as Kunhammu Saheb
- Joy Mathew as Hajyar
- Gourav Menon as Akbar Ali
- Irshad as Abu
- Baby Ardra as Sainu
- Nilambur Ayisha as Ummakunju
- Santhakumari as Abu's mother
- Majeed as Jalajudeen
- Thara Kalyan as Hajiyar's wife
- Nedumbram Gopi as Namboothiri
- V. K. Unnikrishnan as Seythalikka
- Latheef as Sulaiman Musaliar
