= Videsi Nair Swadesi Nair =

Videshi Nair Swadeshi Nair
- Directed by: Paulson
- Screenplay by: A. R. Mukesh
- Story by: Pradeep
- Produced by: Jayesh Chengannor
- Starring: Jagadish; Mahima; Sai Kumar; Rajan P. Dev; Narendra Prasad; Ponnamma Babu
- Cinematography: Babu Rajendran
- Edited by: G. Murali
- Music by: S. P. Venkatesh (film score); Sanjeev Babu (songs)
- Production company: Colourful Cinema
- Distributed by: Vivaswa Release; Colorful Release
- Release date: 25 December 2002
- Country: India
- Language: Malayalam

Videshi Nair Swadeshi Nair is a Malayalam film directed by Paulson. Jagadish plays the lead role in the film.

== Cast ==
- Jagadish as Vindhyan
- Mahima as Neelima
- Sai Kumar as Shivapal
- Rajan P. Dev as Rajappan Nair
- Narendra Prasad as Bhaskaran Nair
- Ponnamma Babu as Pathmavathi, Neelima's mother
- Indrans as Kochumpreman, Vindhyan's friend
- Kanakalatha as Suma, Vindhyan's sister
- Bobby Kottarakkara as Ujwalan (servant)
- Jagannathan as Fr. Idikkula
