= Kumkumacheppu =

- Directed by: Thulasidas
- Written by: A. K. Sajan; A. K. Santhosh
- Screenplay by: Vinu Kiriyath; A. K. Sajan; A. K. Santhosh
- Based on: Maavichiguru (Telugu)
- Produced by: R. Mukesh Mehta
- Starring: Shobhana; Manoj K. Jayan; KPAC Lalitha; Jagadish
- Cinematography: Ramachandra Babu
- Edited by: G. Murali
- Music by: S. P. Venkatesh
- Production company: Soorya Cine Arts
- Distributed by: Soorya Cine Arts
- Release date: 1 August 1996
- Country: India
- Language: Malayalam

Kumkumacheppu is a 1996 Indian Malayalam film, directed by Thulasidas and produced by R. Mukesh Mehta. The film stars Shobhana, Manoj K. Jayan, KPAC Lalitha and Jagadish in the lead roles. The film has musical score by S. P. Venkatesh. Kumkumacheppu is the Malayalam remake of Telugu film Maavi Chiguru, which was released two months earlier.

== Cast ==
- Manoj K. Jayan as Madhu
- Shobhana as Indu
- Priya Raman as Deepa
- Nedumudi Venu as Sekharan
- Reena as Nalini
- Narendra Prasad as Grandfather
- KPAC Lalitha as Grandmother
- Jagadish as Mani
- Vishnu Vijay Vijayakumar as Chindu

== Soundtrack ==
The music was composed by S. P. Venkatesh and the lyrics were written by Kaithapram.

No.	Song	Singers	Lyrics	Length (m:ss)
1	"Ambala Nadakal"	K. S. Chithra, Biju Narayanan	Kaithapram	
2	"Kannaadippoonkavilil"	K. S. Chithra, M. G. Sreekumar	Kaithapram	
3	"Pattana Vilayattam"	K. S. Chithra, M. G. Sreekumar	Kaithapram	
4	"Vida Parayukayaanen Janmam"	K. S. Chithra	Kaithapram	
5	"Vida Parayukayaanen Janmam"	P. Jayachandran	Kaithapram	
