= Narendra Prasad =

Indian actor and playwriter (1946–2003)

- Born: 26 December 1946 Mavelikkara, Quilon Division, Kingdom of Travancore (Present-day Mavelikkara, Kerala)
- Died: 3 November 2003 (aged 56); Kozhikode, Kerala, India
- Education: N. S. S. College, Pandalam; University of Kerala
- Occupations: Professor; Actor; Author

Raghava Kurup Narendra Prasad (26 December 1946 – 3 November 2003) was an Indian actor, playwright, director, teacher and literary critic. He was born at Mavelikkara in the erstwhile Kingdom of Travancore. Appreciated for his body language and performance by the audience and critics, he is known for portraying character roles and villain characters in Malayalam films.

== Personal life ==
He studied at N. S. S. College, Pandalam, for Pre-University and for his degree (in Mathematics). He moved to Institute of English, University of Kerala for his post-graduation in English Language and Literature. A voracious reader in Malayalam and English, Narendra Prasad distinguished himself as a potential man of letters even as a degree student. He used to take part in the Malayalam and English literary discussions, debates and competitions organised at the college and university levels, and won prizes. His play Souparnika won the Kerala Sahitya Akademi Award in 1985.

Narendra Prasad started his career as a college teacher; he joined Bishop Moore College in 1967 as lecturer in English. He got into government service in 1968, and worked as lecturer at Government Victoria College, Palakkad, and Govt. Arts College, Thiruvananthapuram, and as Professor at University College, Thiruvananthapuram. In 1989 while working as Professor of English at University College, he was selected for the post of Director, School of Letters of Mahatma Gandhi University, Kottayam. He continued in this post until his demise.

== Awards ==
Kerala State Film Awards:

- Second Best Actor – 1993 – Paithrukam

== Film ==
He earned recognition as an actor with his portrayal of semi-villainous characters. His hit films include Meleparambil Aanveedu,Aniyan Bava Chetan Bava,Thalastaanam, Utsavamelam, Paithrukam, Sthalathe Pradhana Payyans, Ekalavyan, Bharanakoodam,

Yaadhavam, Aaram Thamburan, Krishnagudiyil Oru Pranayakalathu, Njangal Santhushtaranu, Ustaad, Vazhunnor, One Man Show, and Susanna. He acted in over 150 films, winning the State Award for the 'Best Supporting Actor' for "Paithrukam."

== Death ==
He died at PVS Hospital, Kozhikode on 3 November 2003, due to cardio-respiratory arrest. He had been admitted in Amrita Hospital, Ernakulam for apnea, caused by interstitial lung disease (ILD), a condition that caused disintegration of lungs. From there he was moved to PVS Hospital, where though he gained consciousness, he succumbed to the illness. He was aged 56 at the time of his death. He was cremated with full state honours at his home in Mavelikkara.

== Filmography ==
=== As an actor ===
==== 1980s ====
Year	Title	Role	Notes
1989	Asthikal Pookunnu	Govindan	

==== 1990s ====
Year	Title	Role	Notes
1990	Unnikuttanu Joli Kitti		
1992	Adhwaytham	Sreekantan Pothuval	
1992	Ootty Pattanam	Rajashekhara Varma	
1992	Utsavamelam	Thirumeni	
1992	Thalastaanam	G. Parameswaran	
1992	Rajashilpi	Staanu Aashaan	
1992	Pandu Pandoru Rajakumari	Dr. Robert Franklin D'Souza	
1992	Kudumbasametham	Adv. Mahendran Kurup	
1992	Aardram	Vamadevan	
1993	Sthalathe Pradhana Payyans	Kunjikannan Nambyar	
1993	Pravachakan	MLA Kurian	
1993	Padaleeputhram		
1993	Kudumba Sneham		
1993	Yaadhavam	Chandrasenan	
1993	Thalamura	Nangiyattumadathil Bhadran Namboothiri	
1993	Journalist	Anantharama Sharma	
1993	Sarovaram		
1993	Paithrukam		
1993	Meleparambil Anveedu	Thiruvikraman Pillai	
1993	Kavadiyattam	Unni's father	
1993	Janam	Azheekkal Raghavan	
1993	Ekalavyan	Swami Amoorthananda	
1993	Bhaagyavaan	Divakaran Thekkumthara MLA	
1993	Bandhukkal Sathrukkal	Viswambharan	
1993	Ammayane Sathyam	Jaganatha Varma	
1993	Aayirappara	Padhmanabha Kaimal	
1994	Vardhakya Puranam	Mahendran Thampi	
1994	Pavithram	Sankaran Pillai	
1994	Malappuram Haji Mahanaya Joji	Kuruppu	
1994	Kochaniyan		
1994	Prathakshinam	Parameswaran	
1994	Chukkan	Mahendra Varma	
1994	Galileo	Galileo	
1994	CID Unnikrishnan B.A., B.Ed.	CID Agency Head	
1994	Bheesmacharya	Rajakumaran Thampy	
1994	Dhadha	Vettukadan	
1994	Vishnu	Mathews	
1994	Sukrutham	Dr. Unni	
1994	Bharanakoodam	Devaraj	
1994	Vendor Daniel State Licency	Udayanoor Karavalpadu	
1995	Tom & Jerry	Ananthan Nambiar/Chandrasekhara Varma	
1995	Thirumanassu	Thirumanassu	
1995	Mimics Action 500	Kulashekara Varma Valiyakoyi Thampuran	
1995	Chaithanyam	Thekkepattu Ravunni Nair	
1995	Chantha		Cameo
1995	Boxer	Rajagopalan Thampi	
1995	Sargavasantham	Dr. Sarathchandra Varma	
1995	Mangalam Veettil Manaseswari Gupta	Mangalam Veetil Mooppil Nair	
1995	Kidilol Kidilam	Ramabhadran	
1995	Kalyanji Anandji	Dr. Shankaran	
1995	Kalamasseriyil Kalyanayogam	Kodalipparampil Sankara Menon	
1995	Aniyan Bava Chetan Bava	Kuttan Bava (Chettan Bava)	
1995	Alancheri Thamprakkal	Chanthappan Gurukkal	
1995	Munpe Parakkunna Pakshi		
1995	Ezharakoottam	Andrews Nicolas	
1995	Aksharam	Krishna Murthy	
1995	Sindoora Rekha	Menon	
1995	Oru Abhibhashakante Case Diary	Adv. Jagadish T. Nambiar	
1996	Devaraagam	Ramadhanapadikal	
1996	Sooryaputhrikal		
1996	Mayooranrithyam	Sankaranarayan	
1996	Sulthan Hyderali		
1996	Kanchanam	Billiards Menon	
1996	Excuse Me Ethu Collegila		
1996	Rajaputhran	Vamadevan Karunakaran	
1996	Kumkumacheppu	Grandfather	
1996	Dilliwala Rajakumaran	Udhaya Varma Maharaja	
1996	Kathapurushan	Vasu	
1997	Moonu Kodiyum Munnuru Pavanum		
1997	Kalyanapittennu		
1997	Raajathanthram	Keshava Menon	
1997	Kilikurissiyile Kudumba Mela	Shrimangalathu Ananthakrishnan	
1997	Bhoopathi	Mahendra Varma	
1997	Kannur	M.P. Rajappan	
1997	Suvarna Simhaasanam	Meledathu Madhavan Nair	
1997	Krishnagudiyil Oru Pranayakalathu	Meenakshi's father	
1997	Kaliyattam	Thamburan	
1997	Innalekalillathe	Lonachan	
1997	Kalyanappittannu		
1997	Asuravamsam	Mayor Swami/Ranganathan Swamy	
1997	Aaraam Thampuran	Kulappully Appan Thampuran	
1998	Manthri Maalikayil Manasammatham	Chekuthan Lawrence	
1998	Malabaril Ninnoru Manimaaran		
1998	Mayilpeelikkavu	Rahuleyan	
1998	Kottaram Veettile Apputtan	Ravunni	
1998	Elavamkodu Desam	Adithyan	
1998	Panchaloham	Kuppuvachan Mushari	
1998	Sooryaputhran	Mangalathu Padipurackel Jagannadhan	
1998	British Market	CI Jacob Purakkadan	
1998	Aakhosham		
1999	Vazhunnor	Parakkadan Kochousepp	
1999	Ustaad	Nandan's father	
1999	F. I. R.	Rahim Haji	
1999	Pranaya Nilavu		
1999	Udayapuram Sulthan	Avittam Thirunal Narayana Varma	
1999	Rishivamsam		
1999	Njangal Santhushtaranu	DGP Rajasekharan Nair IPS	
1999	Gopalannayarude Thaadi		

==== 2000s ====
Year	Title	Role	Notes
2000	Mazhanoolkkanavu		
2000	Narashimham	Mooppil Nair	
2000	Sahayathrikakku Snehapoorvam		
2000	Susanna	Prof. Noor Mohammad	
2001	Saivar Thirumeni	Mazhamangalathu Narayanan Nampoothirippadu	
2001	Ee Nadu Innale Vare	Vishambharan Ambalakkadan	
2001	Andolanam		
2001	Randam Bhavam	Ananthakrishnan's father	
2001	Kakki Nakshthram	Thomas Vattoly	
2001	Nakshathragal Parayathirunnathu	Vasudeva Panicker	
2001	Meghasandesam	Samuel	
2001	One Man Show	Adv. K. R. Menon	
2002	Swapnahaliyil Oru Naal		
2002	Abharanacharthu		
2002	Onnaman	Sukumaran Menon	
2002	Punyam		
2002	Krishna Pakshakkilikal		
2002	Videsi Nair Swadesi Nair	Bhaskaran Nair	
2002	Dany	Fr. Simon	
2002	Nakshathrakkannulla Rajakumaran Avanundoru Rajakumari	Adv. Veerabhadra Kurup	
2003	Mizhi Randilum	Musafir Babu	
2003	Varum Varunnu Vannu	Varghese Vaidyan	
2003	Valathottu Thirinjal Nalamathe Veedu	Aditya Varma	
2003	Gowrisankaram		
2004	Kusruthi	Sreevallabhavan	
2004	Kottaram Vaidyan	Bhageerathan	
2004	Kerala House Udan Vilpanakku	Paramu Nair	
2005	The Campus	Narendran	
2005	Deepangal Sakshi	Mullakkal Bhaskaran Nair	
2005	Brahmasuran		
2005	Kadha		

=== As a dubbing artist ===
- Orkkapurathu – Voice for N. L. Balakrishnan
- Adharvam – Voice for Charuhasan
- Vaishali – Voice for Babu Antony
- Douthyam – Voice for Babu Antony
- Chithram – Voice for Poornam Viswanathan
- Meenamasathile Sooryan – Voice for Kakka Ravi
- Njan Gandharvan – voice of Lord Brahma

== Television ==
Towards the second half of the nineties he ventured into television. Shayama Prasad's tele-film Peruvazhiyile Kariyilakal, was Prasad's first venture on the small screen

- Pandavapada (Doordarshan)
- Sthree (Asianet)
- Vedanakalude Viralppaadukal (Kairali TV)
- Shanghupushpam (Asianet)
- Mangalyam (Asianet)

== Documentary film ==
- The documentary film on late Prof. Narendraprasad's life, Arangozhinja Akshara Prabhu was produced by Kulakkara Creations and directed by Arun S, written by R Harikrishnan, cinematography and editing by Thanzil Rajan. Veteran film directors Adoor Gopalakrishnan, Jayaraaj, Sooryakrishnamoorthi, actors P. Sreekumar, M. R. Gopakumar, actor and voice artist Prof. Aliyar, politician M. A. Baby and many other appears in this documentary. The documentary was screened for the first time on 2011 at Mavelikkara Natyagraha before a huge audience, where actor Jagathy Sreekumar received the first disc copy of the project.
