= Kanichukulangarayil CBI =

- Directed by: Suresh Vinu
- Written by: Harikumaran Thampi
- Produced by: Sreekumaran Thampi
- Starring: Manoj K. Jayan; Suresh Krishna; Sai Kumar
- Cinematography: M. D. Sukumaran
- Edited by: P. C. Mohanan
- Music by: S. P. Venkatesh
- Release date: 10 July 2008
- Country: India
- Language: Malayalam

Kanichukulangarayil CBI is a 2008 Malayalam film directed by Suresh-Vinu starring Manoj K. Jayan in the lead role. This film is based on the real life incident Kanichukulangara murder case.

== Plot ==
Ajith and Suresh are the proprietors of Anamala Chit Funds. The success of Anamala Chit Funds is due to the hard work of its managing director, Ratheesh. But due to some differences between his bosses, Ratheesh resigns and sets up another firm and started competing with Anamala.

Ratheesh becomes successful soon and this makes Ajith and Suresh jealous. Soon, Ratheesh and his sister are killed by an oncoming truck while travelling by car at Kanichukulangara. First the police starts investigation, but due to corrupt officials the investigation goes wrong. Then CBI intervenes. CBI officer Arjun with the help of his friend James George who investigated the case before CBI probe, arrest all the culprits. Meanwhile, Ratheesh's widow commits suicide as she is in heavy debt. At the end, the Judiciary frees all the culprits due to lack of evidence. However while coming out, Anamala Suresh and Ajith are gunned by the brother of Ratheesh, who confesses to the police he did because the culprits should not destroy anymore families like they did to him.

== Cast ==
- Manoj K. Jayan as Arjun
- Suresh Krishna as James George
- Lakshmi Sharma as Susan Thomas
- Sai Kumar as Ajith
- Meghanathan as Suresh
- Sadiq as Ratheesh
- Rajan P. Dev as Krishnagopal
- Kollam Thulasi as Adv.Rahim
- Chali Pala as Somasekharan
- Sudheer Sukumaran as Police Officer
- Reshmi Boban as Thanky Ratheesh
