= Tom & Jerry (1995 film) =

- Directed by: Kaladharan
- Screenplay by: Rajan Kiriyath; Vinu Kiriyath
- Story by: Lakshmi Nair
- Produced by: N. J. Cyril
- Starring: Mukesh; Jagadish; Annie; Jagathi Sreekumar
- Cinematography: Venu
- Edited by: Bhoominathan
- Music by: K. Sanan Nair
- Release date: 1995
- Country: India
- Language: Malayalam

Tom & Jerry is 1995 Indian Malayalam-language comedy film directed by Kaladharan. The film stars Mukesh, Jagadish, Annie, and Jagathy Sreekumar.

== Plot ==
The film tells the story about two men, who searches for his father whom he has never met; they meet and help a little girl escape from her identity stealing con-artist Aunt Balagopalan in order to find her lost (and presumed dead) father who was actually murdered by Chandrasekharna Varma.

== Cast ==
- Mukesh as Balagopalan
- Jagadish as Kuttikrishnan
- Jagathy Sreekumar as Mukundan
- Annie as Meenakshi
- Rajan P. Dev as Krishnadas
- Narendra Prasad as Ananthan Nambiar / Chandrasekhara Varma
- Kuthiravattam Pappu as Kesava Kaimal
- C. I. Paul as Lazar
- Sainuddin as Peter
- Janardhanan as Chachan
- Mahesh as Ramanan
- Bobby Kottarakkara
- Harisree Asokan
- Vinduja Menon as Nandini
- Zeenath as Devaki (as Zeenat)
- Sukumari as Balagopalan's Mother
- Machan Varghese as Security
- Biju Pappan
