= Sparsham =

- Directed by: Mohan Roop
- Written by: Mohan Roop; Sathrughnan (dialogues)
- Screenplay by: Sathrughnan
- Produced by: SURESH STANLY KK
- Starring: Manoj K. Jayan; Thilakan; Murali; Siddique
- Cinematography: Sreesankar
- Edited by: E. M. Madhavan
- Music by: Sharreth
- Production company: Chandralekha Films
- Distributed by: Chandralekha Films
- Release date: 1999
- Country: India
- Language: Malayalam

Sparsham is a 1999 Indian Malayalam film, directed by Mohan Roop. The film stars Manoj K. Jayan, Thilakan, Murali and Siddique in the lead roles. Sharreth composed the musical score.

== Cast ==
- Manoj K. Jayan as Mahesh
- Thilakan as Pothuval Ashan
- Murali as Valappil Raghavan
- Siddique as Ashokan
- Jagadish as Shivadasan
- Kaveri as Arudhathi
- Priya Raman as Rajani
- Chandni Shaju as Meera
- Manuraj as Prasad
- Meena Ganesh as Bhargaviyamma
- Ponnamma Babu as Sarojini
- Sarath Das as Manu
- Tony as Hareedran
- Sathaar as Rajashekharan
- T. S. Raju as Sreekandan Nair
- Vishnu Prasad – Cameo Appearance

== Soundtrack ==
The music was composed by Sharreth with lyrics written by S. Ramesan Nair.

No.	Song	Singers	Lyrics	Length (m:ss)
1	"Doorathaarakangal"	K. J. Yesudas	S. Ramesan Nair	
2	"Ee Shyaamasandhyayil"	K. J. Yesudas	S. Ramesan Nair	
3	"Indumathippoovirinjathu"	K. S. Chithra	S. Ramesan Nair	
4	"Kalyaanakkuyil Vilikkum"	K. S. Chithra	S. Ramesan Nair	
5	"Koodozhinju Kudiyeri Varunnu"	K. S. Chithra	S. Ramesan Nair	
6	"Nakshathrappuzhayil"	Minmini	S. Ramesan Nair	
7	"Pandenno Kettathaane"	Sharreth	S. Ramesan Nair	
8	"Thengi Mounam Thengi"	Sharreth	S. Ramesan Nair	
