= Keerthi Gopinath =

Indian film actress

- Born: Keerthi Gopinath; 2 May 1977 (age 49); Kottayam, India
- Other name: Keerthi Rahul
- Occupations: actress, dancer
- Years active: 1994-1997, 2020-present

Keerthi Gopinath is an Indian actress who acts mainly in Malayalam movies and television serials. She made a comeback after 20 years through Ammayariyathe telecasting in Asianet. She acted as heroine in the comedy movie Junior Mandrake released in 1997. Her role as Vava in Asianet serial Niramala was also well noted.

== Personal life ==
She was born to Gopinath and Geetha at Lakkattoor, Kottayam, Kerala. Her father was an air force officer and her mother a housewife. Since her father was in the air force. and had transfers every three years, she studied in different parts of India. She gained her primary education in Bangalore.

She is married to Rahul, who is also an actor in Malayalam and Tamil serials. The couple has two sons, Bharath and Aryan.

== Filmography ==
Year	Title	Role	Notes
1994	Pavam I. A. Ivachan	Jasmine	
1995	Mazhayethum Munpe	Shwetha	
1995	Kidilolkkidilam	Indhu	
1995	Keerthanam	Kariya's daughter	
1996	Aakaashathekkoru Kilivaathil	Subhashini	
1996	April 19	Mini	
1997	Junior Mandrake	Priya	
1997	Manthramothiram	Bindhu	
1997	Vamsam	Annie	
	Ammayude Makan	-	Telefilm
	Love Story	-	Telefilm

== Television ==
Year	Title	Role	Channel	Notes
1995	Niramala	Vava	Asianet	
2020-2023	Ammayariyathe	Neeraja Mahadevan	Asianet	
2023-2024	Parvathy	Vishal's mother	Zee Keralam	
2024–2026	Snehakkoottu	Poornima Menon	Asianet	
2025–present	Chembarathy	Chandralekha	Zee Keralam	
