= Rudraksham =

- Directed by: Shaji Kailas
- Written by: Ranjith
- Produced by: M. Mani
- Starring: Suresh Gopi; Annie; Geetha; Vijayaraghavan; Rajan P. Dev
- Cinematography: S. Kumar
- Edited by: L.Bhoominathan
- Music by: Rajamani; Sharreth
- Production company: Sunitha Productions
- Distributed by: Aroma Release
- Release date: 1994
- Running time: 170 minutes
- Country: India
- Language: Malayalam

Rudraksham (Malayalam: രുദ്രാക്ഷം) is a 1994 Malayalam-language action thriller film directed by Shaji Kailas and written by Ranjith. It stars Suresh Gopi, Annie and Devan.

Rudraksham was criticized for extreme violence, but became a commercial success at the box office. Some part of the plot is inspired from the hindi movie Sadak (1991).

== Plot ==
Due to his passion for agriculture, Vishwanathan quits his job at an MNC and settles in his village. One day, Viswanathan gets a call from Hyderabad that his sister Revathi, who is studying medicine at a medical college has been missing for the past couple of days. Vishwanathan sets out to Hyderabad on the same day in a tourist bus. The bus, which is on a trip to Tirupati, is packed with Tamil-speaking Hindu pilgrims. Gowri, who is among the pilgrims, grabs his attention for her singing abilities.

Upon reaching Hyderabad, Vishwanathan reaches the college, and from her friends learns that Revathi had received threats from Sudhakar Reddy, the son of a syndicate gangster named Reddy. Revathi, who had witnessed a murder committed by Sudhakar, had planned to appear at an identification parade at the police station. Enraged, Sudhakar tries to assault her, where Revathi, in an effort to save herself, falls down from the top of a building and dies. Vishwanathan visits the nearby police station to file a complaint, but gets a cold response from the local Inspector, who threatens to arrest Vishwanathan, if he decides to move ahead with the complaint.

Vishwanathan gets enraged, where he gets into a scuffle with Sudhakar, and kills him, which causes Reddy to hunt for Vishwanathan, who is saved by Reddy's rival Patel. Vishwanathan is made to stay at a brothel run by Patel, where he meets a good-hearted chap named Appu. At the brothel, Vishwanathan is shocked to see Gowri, where he learns from Appu that she was trapped and kidnapped at Tirupathi and has been sold to Patel by a lady pimp. On meeting Vishwanathan, Gowri pleads with him to save her. At night, she injures CI Rao. Vishwanathan decides to save her and is helped by Appu in finding a route outside.

Appu introduces him to Jose, a truck driver from Kerala and his sidekick Kunjahammed, but Appu is killed by the Patel's goons. Vishwanathan flees from the brothel with Gowri and is followed by Patel and his goons. On another side, Reddy is also after him. Their chase turns more violent as they face several hardships on the path, including many local criminals. After a bloodshedding fight, Vishwanathan succeeds in saving Gowri by killing both Patel and Reddy.

== Cast ==
- Suresh Gopi as Vishwanathan
- Annie as Gouri
- Geetha as Rathnam
- Maathu as Revathi
- Vijayaraghavan as Joseph
- Devan as Patel
- R. N. Sudarshan as Kovidha Reddy
- K. B. Ganesh Kumar as Sudhakar Reddy
- Rajan P. Dev as Nair, Reddy's henchman
- Chithra as Doctor
- Augustine as Kunjahammad
- Bheeman Raghu as Thankachan
- Maniyanpilla Raju as Appu
- Bobby Kottarakkara as Mahesh, Hospital Attandant
- T. P. Madhavan as Appunni Nair
- Sadiq as CI Ramanathan
- Vinu Chakravarthy as CI Rao
- Abu Salim as Arumugam, Patel's henchman
- T.S. Krishnan
- Tony

== Production ==
This film had just one song, which was penned by Renji Panicker. It was on the sets of this film that director Shaji Kailas fell in love with Annie. They got married a year later. This was the second film of Annie. She made a stunning come back and became the most popular heroine of her time. She went on to act in more than a dozen films during the next year.

== Legacy ==
Due to the success of the film, Shaji Kailas and Ranjith collaborated for blockbuster films like Asuravamsam, Aaram Thamburan, Narasimham and Valliettan.
