= Zeenath =

Indian actress

Zeenath A. P.
- Born: 29 December 1964 (age 61); Nilambur, Malappuram, Kerala, India
- Occupation: Actress
- Years active: 1986–present
- Spouses: K. T. Muhammed (m. 1981; div. 1993); Anil Kumar
- Children: 2

Zeenath A. P. (born 29 December 1964) is an Indian actress and dubbing artist. She was a prominent supporting actress during the 1990s in the Malayalam film industry.

== Personal life ==
In 1981, Zeenath married Malayalam drama director and producer K. T. Muhammed when she was 18 and he was 54. The marriage proved unsuccessful due to wide age gap. Their only son, Jithin, is married to Saleena Salim. Zeenath divorced Muhammed in 1993.

Zeenath later married Anil Kumar, with whom she has a son, Nithin Anil. She currently resides in Kochi.

== Awards ==
- 2007 - Kerala State Film Award for Best Dubbing Artist- Paradesi for Shwetha Menon
- 2016 - CPC Cine Awards for Best Character Actress - Alif

Kerala State Television Award

- 1991 - Best Actress- Poovanpazham ( telefilm) by Vaikkom Muhammed Basheer
- 2005 - Best Supporting Actress - Sulthanveedu (Serial)

Kerala Film Critics Association Awards

- 2020 - Special Jury Award for direction - Randam Naal

== Filmography ==
=== As actress ===
- 1978 Mayoora Varnangal
- 1978 Chuvanna Vithukal
- 1979 Anyarude Bhoomi
- 1979 Ival Oru Naadodi
- 1986 Hello My Dear Wrong Number
- 1987 Oridathu as Christian lady
- 1988 Ore Thooval Pakshikal
- 1991 Dhanam as Lekshmi
- 1991 Ulladakkam as Reena
- 1991 Kilukkam as Schoolteacher
- 1991 Godfather as Karthyani
- 1992 Ayalathe Adheham
- 1992 Neelakurukkan
- 1992 Kavacham
- 1992 Kaazhchakkppuram as Harikumar's Wife
- 1992 Grihaprevesam as Shobha
- 1992 Makkalmaahaathmyam as Saraswathi Amma
- 1992 Thiruthalvaadi as Parvathy
- 1992 Ulsavamelam as Kanakaprabha's mother
- 1992 Aayushkalam as Geetha
- 1992 Mahanagaram as Kalyani
- 1992 Kudumbasametham as Shyamala
- 1993 Theeram Thedunna Thirakal
- 1993 Ghazal as Amina Umma
- 1993 Sarovaram as Damu's wife
- 1993 Kabooliwala as Laila's mother
- 1993 Samooham as Rajalekshmi's sister
- 1993 Porutham as Vijayalakshmi
- 1993 Koushalam as Rosy
- 1993 Bandhukkal Sathrukkal as Kamalakshi amma
- 1993 Kulapathi as Thanku
- 1993 Mithunam as Subhadra
- 1993 Magrib as Safia
- 1994 Njan Kodeeswaran
- 1994 Puthran
- 1994 Ponthan Mada as
- 1994 Varaphalam as Anjali's mother
- 1994 Vishnu as Rajamma
- 1994 Sagaram Sakshi as Nirmala's sister
- 1995 Aadhyathe Kanmani
- 1995 Maanam Thelinjappol as
- 1995 Bali as
- 1995 Achan Raajaavu Appan Jethaavu as Sarasu
- 1995 Thovalapookkal as Lakshmi
- 1995 Shashinaas as Beevi
- 1995 Ratholsavam as Seethamm's mother
- 1995 Parvathy Parinayam as Subhadra
- 1995 Tom & Jerry as Devaki
- 1995 Three Men Army as Subhashini
- 1995 Simhavalan Menon as Gomathi
- 1995 Sindoora Rekha as Rajalakshmi
- 1995 Kidilol Kidilam as Savithri
- 1995 Sipayi Lahala as Rajendran's mother
- 1995 Kakkakum Poochakkum Kalyanam as Mahalakshmi
- 1996 April 19
- 1996 Devaragam as Arathi
- 1996 Sathyabhaamaykkoru Pranayalekhanam as Subhadra
- 1996 Aakeshathekkoru Kilivathil as Lalitha
- 1996 Swapna Lokathe Balabhaskaran as Sadasivan's wife
- 1996 Hitler as Devarajan's wife
- 1996 Mr. Clean as Savithri
- 1997 Junior Mandrake as Vishalakshi
- 1997 The Good Boys as Gomathi Teacher
- 1997 Superman as Bhavani
- 1997 Mannadiar Penninu Chenkotta Checkan as Leelamani
- 1997 Kadhanayakan as Ammalu
- 1997 Killikurushiyile Kudumba Mela as Ananthan's wife
- 1997 Ikkareyanente Manasam as Padmini
- 1997 Ishtadanam as Selina
- 1998 Aanappara Achamma
- 1998 Vismayam as Vathsalakumari
- 1998 Manthri Kochamma
- 1998 Meenathil Thalikettu as Sarada
- 1998 Grama Panchayath as Shantha
- 1998 Gloria Fernandes From U.S.A. as Alice
- 1998 Dravidan as Rarichan's mother
- 1999 Garshom as Jameela
- 1999 Ezhupunna Tharakan
- 1999 Gaandhiyan
- 1999 Pattabhishekam as Aadi Thampuran's wife
- 1999 Friends as Lalitha
- 1999 Crime File as Mother Superior
- 2000 Ingane Oru Nilapakshi as Vijayan's mother
- 2000 Mr.Buttlers as Sumathi
- 2000 Joker as Jameela
- 2001 Raajapattam
- 2001 Korappan The Great
- 2001 Soothradharan
- 2001 Uthaman as Saramma
- 2000 Arayannegalude Veedu as Laila
- 2002 Nandanam as Unniyamma's kin
- 2002 Neelaakaasham Niraye as Unni's sister
- 2002 Pranyamanithooval as Balu's mother
- 2003 Chronic Bachelor as Bhama's mother
- 2003 Pattalam as Malini
- 2003 Mizhi Randilum as Vathsala Koshy
- 2004 Mampazhakkalam
- 2004 Udayam as Bharathi
- 2004 Mayilattam as Mythili's mother
- 2005 Daivanamathil as Anwar's mother
- 2005 The Campus as Najeeb's mother
- 2005 Chandrolsavam as Santha
- 2005 Pandippada as Bhuvanachandran's Mother
- 2006 Pakal as Shantha
- 2006 Kisan as Savithri
- 2007 Nagaram as Dr Cicily
- 2007 Anchil Oral Arjunan as Sathi
- 2007 Sooryan as Sooryan's sister
- 2007 Paradesi as Sulekha
- 2007 Ali Bhai aa Amminiyamma
- 2007 Nasrani as Prisoner
- 2008 Raman as Krishnan;s wife
- 2008 Gulmohar as Paulachan's Wife
- 2008 Kabadi Kabadi as Saraswathi
- 2008 Malabar Wedding as Ilayamma
- 2008 Vilapangalkkappuram as Usman's sister
- 2009 Samayam
- 2009 Kancheepurathe Kalyanam as Devanayagi
- 2009 Decent Parties as Sudheendran's mother
- 2010 Khilafath
- 2010 Senior Mandrake as Archive footage
- 2010 Body Guard as Mani Chechi
- 2010 Ringtone as Krishna's mother
- 2010 Valiyangadi as Pareekutty's mother
- 2011 Krishna Rajapuram
- 2011 Lucky Jokers as Parvathy Thampuratti
- 2011 The Train as Suhana's mother
- 2011 Vellaripravinte Changathi as Actress
- 2011 Koratty Pattanam Railway Gate as Annie's mother
- 2011 August 15 as College Principal
- 2011 Sevenes ... Arun's mother
- 2011 Indian Rupee as Jayaprkash's mother, Yashodha
- 2012 Veendum Kannur
- 2012 Naughty Professor as Neighbour
- 2012 Josettante Hero as Annie
- 2012 Bhoopadathil Illatha Oridam as Karthyayini
- 2013 Isaac Newton S/O Philipose as Gracy
- 2014 Parayan Baaki Vechathu as Emmanuel's mother
- 2014 Bad Boys
- 2014 Gunda as Jhansi Rani
- 2015 Ente Cinema- The Movie Festival
- 2015 Haram as Ameena's mother
- 2015 Aashamsakalode Anna as Sherly
- 2015 Elanjikkavu P.O as Lakshmi's mother
- 2015 Alif as Aatta/Fathima's mother
- 2015 Kanthari as Palarivattam Padmavathi
- 2016 Shajahanum Pareekuttiyum as Prince's mother
- 2017 Oru Visheshapetta Biriyani Kissa as Fathima
- 2019 Virus as Dr.Akila's mother
- 2019 Arayakkadavil
- 2020 Halal Love Story as Rahim's wife
- 2022 The Epitaph (Short film) as Rukhiyya
- 2022 Kochaal as Mariyamma
- 2022 Rorschach as Satheeshan 's mother
- 2024 Randaam Naal - 2024

{director/story/script too}

- Peppatty
- Ammayi (Short film)
- Mysore 150 k
- 2024 Kuruvipaappa
- 2025 Kadalolam Sneham

=== As dubbing artist ===
- Paradesi-voice for Swetha Menon
- Penpattanam-voice for Swetha Menon
- Paleri Manikyam: Oru Pathirakolapathakathinte Katha-voice for Swetha Menon
- Rani Padmini - voice for Sajitha Madathil
- Salala Mobiles- Voice for Geetha
- TBA - voice for Parvathi T.
- Alone as Sheela Varky

== Television serials ==
- Poovanpazham (Doordarshan)
- Bandhanam (Doordarshan)
- Punnakka Vikasana Corporation (Doordarshan)
- Ladies Hostel (Doordarshan)
- Kamandalam (Doordarshan)
- Bandhangal (Doordarshan)
- Paying Guest (Doordarshan)
- Sultanveedu (Kairali TV)
- Ragardram (Doordarshan)
- Aatma (Kairali TV) - Producer also
- Shanghupushpam (Asianet)
- Kadamattathu Kathanar (Asianet)
- Sooryaputhri (Asianet)
- Sindoorakuruvi (Surya TV)
- Nizhalukal (Asianet)
- Kanal Kireedam (Asianet)
- Swantham Malootty (Surya TV)
- Pavithra Bhandham (Surya TV)
- Parinayam (Mazhavil Manorama)
- Bhagyadevatha (Mazhavil Manorama)
- Bandhuvaru Sathruvaru (Mazhavil Manorama)
- Jagritha (Amrita TV)
- CBI Diary(Mazhavil Manorama)
- Thenum Vayambum (Surya TV)
- Dany's (Goodness TV) - Telefilm as Mary
- Santhwanam (Asianet)

== Dramas ==
- Snehabandham
- Khafar
- Srishti
- Swantham Lekhakan
- Vriddha

== TV shows ==
- Pularkkalam
- Sarigama
- Smart Show
- Annie's Kitchen
- Annorikkal
- Ruchibhedam
- Yo Yo Krishnanum Yasodamaarum
- Red Carpet
