= Otta Nanayam =

- Directed by: Suresh Kannan
- Written by: Kaloor Dennis
- Produced by: Balu Irinjalakuda
- Starring: Dinu Dennis; Priyamani; Harisree Ashokan; Jagathy Sreekumar
- Music by: S. P. Venkatesh
- Production company: Balus International
- Release date: 14 October 2005
- Country: India
- Language: Malayalam

Otta Nanayam is a 2005 Malayalam-language film directed by Suresh Kannan and written by Kaloor Dennis. It stars Dinu Dennis and Priyamani in the lead roles, with music composed by S. P. Venkatesh.

== Plot ==
The film tells the story of Aravindan (Dinu Dennis), a poor person from lower-middle-class family who was forced to join a colony of beggars so he could make some money for the liver operation of his ailing mother. This is where he meets Chippy (Priyamani), who lives the life of a beggar with poor children. The film shows the organized begging racket in cities, exploitation by anti-social elements and sad life of the people who are initially forced into this profession and do not get a chance for a better life.

== Cast ==
Dinu Dennis, the son of writer Kaloor Dennis is the hero.

Actor	Role		
Dinu Dennis	Aravindan		
Priyamani	Chippy		
Harisree Ashokan	Paramu		
Jagathy Sreekumar	Usthad		
Salim Kumar	Charly		
Muktha	Chinnu		
Ambika Mohan	Aravindan's mother		
Rohit Menon	Motta	Shobha Mohan	Chippy's mother

== Production ==
During the film shooting at Ernakulam Junction railway station, Priyamani was mistaken for beggar since she was asking for alms from passengers along with real life beggars.

== Soundtrack ==
The film's soundtrack contains 3 songs, all composed by S. P. Venkitesh and Lyrics by O. N. V. Kurup.

#	Title	Singer(s)
1	"Asthamaya"	P. Jayachandran
2	"Ee Kaikalil"	K. S. Chitra
3	"En Swaasame"	Sujatha Mohan, P. Unnikrishnan
