= Achan Rajavu Appan Jethavu =

- VCD cover
- Directed by: Nissar
- Written by: Rafeeque Sealattu
- Screenplay by: Rafeeque Sealattu
- Produced by: M.Baiju, K.G Prasannan, R. Ramanan
- Starring: Mukesh; Devayani
- Cinematography: Venogopal
- Edited by: G. Murali
- Music by: Rajamony; Lyrics: Gireesh Puttancheri
- Distributed by: Five Star Release
- Release date: 1995
- Country: India
- Language: Malayalam

Achan Rajavu Appan Jethavu is a 1995 Indian Malayalam film, directed by Nissar, starring Mukesh and Devayani in the lead roles.

== Plot ==
This movie tells the story of two friends, their families, and the evolution of their relationship. The film starts by portraying the strong bond between Avarachan, Thampi, and Avarachan's conniving brother-in-law, Philipose. Together, they form an indomitable team, relying on Thampi's intelligence and Avarachan's strength to accomplish various tasks.

Their wives are pregnant, with each of them hoping for a girl child. Their wives go into labour at the same time, while Avarachan is away on an assignment. Thampi calls Mariamma Chettathi, a midwife who is adept at delivering children. Avarachan's wife delivers a boy and Thampi gives birth to a girl.

After the birth, Avarachan's sister switches the babies as per Philipose's request. He then does the same, not knowing that his wife had done it before.

Avarachan on returning finds that his wife has delivered a boy child, while she believes that she has delivered a girl. In reality, she has delivered a boy child, but neither she nor Thampis wife sure about the truth. This confusion leads to an issue between the two friends, ultimately resulting in a situation that Philipose planned.

They both believe that the other friend has cheated, with Madhavan Thampi living in poverty compared against to Avarachan who lives in the lap of luxury.

Their children Unnikrishnan and Alice respectively grow up as enemies and end up in the same law college. On the other side, Thomaskutty- the adopted child of Philipose hopes to marry Alice one day, even though she has no intention of a relationship with him.

A chance encounter with Mariamma Chettathi, the woman who delivered the children leads the families to realise that the children were exchanged at birth. They both return to their actual family, rechristened as Kunjuvareed and Kalyani.

They devise a plan to bring the families closer by acting as if they are in love. The plan works perfectly, with both of them standing up for their love. In the end, they fall in love with each other in reality. Both families arrange for the wedding on the same day. They, visualising a dire situation ahead, plan something in advance.

On the day of the marriage, both of them decide to register the marriage. But Philipose has a different malicious program altogether. He kidnaps Kalyani so that the wedding doesn't happen. A terrible fight ensues and finally, Avarachan and Thampi patch everything up for their children.

Everything ends well, with families united together at last.

== Cast ==
- Mukesh as Unnikrishnan/Kunjuvareed
- Devayani as Alice/Kalyani
- Rajan P Dev as Avarachan
- Janardanan as Madhavan Thampi
- Prem Kumar as Thomaskutty
- Harishree Ashokan as Dushyantharaj
- Cochin Haneefa as Thalakkadi Thankappan
- A. C. Zainuddin
- Elias Babu as Philipose
- Ajith Kollam as Philipose's son
- Zeenath as Sarasu
- Kanakalatha as Annamma
- Adoor Pankajam as Mariamma
- Jayasanker Karimuttam
- K. R. Vatsala
