= Mazhayethum Munpe =

- Poster
- Directed by: Kamal
- Written by: Sreenivasan
- Produced by: Madhavan Nair
- Starring: Mammootty; Shobhana; Annie; Sreenivasan
- Cinematography: S. Kumar
- Edited by: K. Rajagopal
- Music by: Original Songs: Raveendran; R. Anandh; Background Score: S. P. Venkatesh
- Production company: Murali Films
- Distributed by: Central Prism
- Release date: 31 March 1995
- Country: India
- Language: Malayalam

Mazhayethum Munpe (transl. Before It Rains) is a 1995 Indian Malayalam-language romantic drama film directed by Kamal and written by Sreenivasan. The film stars Mammootty, Shobhana and Annie and in the lead roles. The plot is centered upon a college professor named Nandakumar, his fiancée Uma Maheshwari, and his student Shruthi. The film was a commercial success. Annie won the Filmfare Award for Best Actress for her performance as Shruthi. In 2005, this movie was remade in Hindi by the same director as Zameer: The Fire Within starring Ajay Devgan, Ameesha Patel and Mahima Chaudhry.

== Plot ==
The movie starts with Rahman arriving in Kolkata in search of Nandakumar Varma who disappeared 5 years ago. He finally finds Nandakumar in a depressed state. Rahman compels him to return to Kerala but he refuses. Finally, he succumbs to the pressure and complies. After he returns, the movie goes to flashback mode revealing the reasons for Nandakumar's estranged state.

Nandakumar was a college professor. He had moved to the city from his village in Kerala for the sake of his job. Rahman was his colleague with whom he stayed. In the college he had to confront a mischievous gang of girls headed by Shruthi. Nandakumar had a serious, no-nonsense attitude and the gang played a lot of pranks upon him. Nandakumar had a second life in his native village, where he had to take care of the treatment of his paralyzed fiancée Uma Maheshwari. It was to meet her medical expenses that he had taken up this job.

The tussle between Nandakumar and the gang proceeded in parallel. Gradually, Shruthi falls for Nandakumar and revealed her feelings for him. He laughed it off as a teenage infatuation but she persisted. Meanwhile, Uma's condition improved remarkably with her regaining the ability to walk. Nandakumar, who had developed a cordial relationship with the gang by then, took them for a trip to his picturesque village. His main intention was to make Shruthi meet Uma so that she would change her mind. Shruthi got shattered on witnessing the warmth in the relationship between Uma and Nandkumar. After returning, she paid a discreet visit to Uma. There she revealed her feelings for Nandakumar to Uma. She accused Uma of being selfish and possessive by forcing Nandakumar to sacrifice his life and pleasures for her sake. Uma gets a mental shock from the vitriolic behaviour of Shruthi and that triggered a second stroke. She became paralyzed again and doctors gave up all hope. She forces Nandakumar to marry Shruthi and he complied reluctantly.

Post-Marriage, Shruthi regrets her mistakes and tells Nandakumar about her discreet meeting with Uma. Enraged by this revelation, he slaps and curses Shruthi then leaves his home wandering across places like a madman.

The movie returns to the present mode where Nandakumar learns that Shruthi had committed suicide 4 years ago for ruining the lives of his and Uma's after giving birth to his daughter, resulting in Nandakumar forgiving Shruthi . Rahman takes Nandakumar to the latter's home, there he finds Uma whose condition improved, taking care of his child who is also named Shruthi by Uma.

== Cast ==
- Mammootty as Nandakumar Varma
- Shobhana as Uma Maheswari
- Annie as Shruthi
- Sreenivasan as Rahman
- Suma Jayaram as Rehna, Rahman's wife
- Praseetha Menon as Kunjumol, Shruthi's friend
- Manju Pillai as Anjana, Shruthi's friend
- Keerthi Gopinath as Shwetha, Shruthi's friend
- Sankaradi as Uma's father
- N. F. Varghese as Valappil Kaimal, Shruthi's Father
- Sukumari as Mariamma, caretaker of Shruthi's house
- T. P. Madhavan as Narayanan Nair
- Valsala Menon as College Principal
- Madhu Mohan as Dr. Issac
- Usharani

== Soundtrack ==
Mazhayethum Munpe

Soundtrack album by Raveendran & R. Anandh
- Released: 1995 (India)
- Genre: Feature film soundtrack

Raveendran chronology
Kakkakkum Poochakkum Kalyanam (1995)	Mazhayethum Munpe (1995)	Oru Abhibhashakante Case Diary (1995)

R. Anandh chronology
Mazhayethum Munpe (1995)	Nirnayam (1995)

Raveendran composed 3 out of the six songs while R. Anandh composed the rest. The film score was composed by S. P. Venkatesh.

#	Song	Artist(s)	Composer	Raga(s)
1	"Aathmavin Pusthaka"	K. J. Yesudas	Raveendran	Darbari Kanada
2	"Chicha Chicha"	S. Janaki	Raveendran	
3	"Enthinu Veroru Sooryodayam"	K. J. Yesudas, K. S. Chithra	Raveendran	Shuddha Dhanyasi
4	"Ladies Collegil Campus"	Usha Uthup, Annupamaa, M. G. Sreekumar, Mammootty	R. Anandh	
5	"Manassu Pole"	Mano	R. Anandh	
6	"Swarnapakshi Swarnapakshi Ku Koo"	Sujatha Mohan, Manoj	R. Anandh	Hamsadhwani

== Release ==
The film was released on 31 March 1995, and became a success.

== Awards ==
Filmfare Awards South

- Filmfare Award for Best Actress - Malayalam - Annie
- Filmfare Award for Best Music Director - Malayalam - Raveendran

Kerala State Film Awards

- Best Screenplay - Sreenivasan
- Kerala State Film Award for Best Film with Popular Appeal and Aesthetic Value - Kamal, Madhavan Nair
- Best Male Playback Singer - K. J. Yesudas - Aathmavin Pusthakathalil
- Ramu Kariat award - Kamal
