= Annie (Malayalam actress) =

Indian actress

- Born: Annie Jobbie; 21 July 1975 (age 50); Pala, Kottayam, Kerala
- Other name: Chitra Shaji Kailas
- Occupations: Actress; Television presenter
- Years active: 1993–1996 (Films); 2015–present (TV)
- Spouse: Shaji Kailas (m. 1996)
- Children: 3

Chitra Shaji Kailas (born Annie Jobbie; 21 July 1975), better known by her birth name Annie, is an Indian television host and former actress from Kerala, who appears in Malayalam television and films. Her film career spanned three years from 1993 to 1996 with a total of 16 films in Malayalam cinema, she retired from acting post-marriage and returned as a television host in 2015.

She debuted as an actress in 1993 in the film Ammayane Sathyam directed by Balachandra Menon. She won the Filmfare Award for Best Actress – Malayalam for her role in Mazhayethum Munpe (1995). Her other most noted films include Parvathy Parinayam (1995) directed by P. G. Viswambharan, Rudraksham (1994), Tom & Jerry (1995), Puthukkottayile Puthumanavalan (1995), and Swapna Lokathe Balabhaskaran (1996).

== Early life ==
Annie hails from Pala and was raised in Thiruvalla. She was born to Jobbie and Mariamma in 1975. She has three older sisters, Lissy, Mary, and Tessy. Her mother died when she was in eighth grade.

Though she was from Pala, her family was settled at Thiruvananthapuram due to her father's job. She did her schooling at the Holy Angel's Convent School in Thiruvananthapuram and then joined All Saints College for higher studies. It was during this time that she began acting in movies.

Annie is married to Shaji Kailas. She converted to Hinduism three months after her marriage and changed her name to Chitra. The couple has three sons: Jagan, Sharon, and Rushin.

== Filmography ==
=== Films ===
Year	Title	Role	Notes
1993	Ammayane Sathyam	Parvathi / Thomas / Ramkumar Chengammanad	
1994	Rudraksham	Gouri	
1995	Aksharam	Meenakshi	
1995	Mazhayethum Munpe	Shruthi	
1995	Alancheri Thamprakkal	Meera/Lekha Varma	
1995	Parvathy Parinayam	Parvathi	
1995	Mazhavilkoodaram	Binu	
1995	Kalyanji Anandji	Nirmala, Shivagami	
1995	Tom & Jerry	Meenakshi	
1995	Indian Military Intelligence		Song appearance
1995	Puthukkottayile Puthumanavalan	Geethu	
1995	Sakshyam	Daisey	
1996	Kireedamillatha Rajakkanmar	Nancy & Bincy	
1996	Mookkilla Rajyathu Murimookkan Rajavu	Chandini Varma	
1996	Mr. Clean	Nandini Thampi	
1996	Swapna Lokathe Balabhaskaran	Chandrika	
2023	Alone	Dr. Susan	Voice only

=== Television ===
Year	Program	Role	Channel	Notes
1993	Chitrageetham	Host	Doordarshan	
2010	Uthradapachakam	Host	Kairali TV	
2015–2020	Annie's Kitchen	Host	Amrita TV	
2017	Comedy Stars	Judge	Asianet	
2018	Annieyude Ruchikootukal	Host	Amrita TV	
2018	Tasty days in Dubai with Annie	Host	Amrita TV	
2018	Super Jodi	Judge	Surya TV	Replaced Shwetha Menon
2019	Sakalakalavallabhan	Judge	Asianet	
2020	Red Carpet	Mentor	Amrita TV	
2022	Jananayakan	Herself	Amrita TV	special show
2023	Super Ammayum Makalum	Judge	Amrita TV	
2023	Cook with comedy	Judge	Asianet	
2024–present	Annie's Kitchen	Host	Amrita TV	
2024	Amrita Cake Carnival	Judge	Amrita TV	Christmas special show

== Awards ==
- 1996 - Filmfare Award for Best Actress – Malayalam for Mazhayethum Munpe
- 2016 - Vayalar Awards - Best Television Host

== Controversies ==
Annie's Kitchen a cookery cum chat show hosted by Annie in Amrita TV have invited lot of criticism over sexist remarks, endorsing patriarchy, stereotyping, conservatism and body shaming. She was subjected to a lot of social media trolls in 2020, following one such talks with Nimisha Sajayan.
