= Aksharam =

1995 film by Sibi Malayil

- Poster
- Directed by: Sibi Malayil
- Written by: John Paul
- Screenplay by: John Paul
- Starring: Suresh Gopi; Annie; Madhavi; Narendra Prasad
- Cinematography: Ravi K. Chandran
- Edited by: L. Bhoominathan
- Music by: Perumbavoor G. Ravindranath
- Production company: Pegas Pictures
- Distributed by: Pegas Pictures
- Release date: 30 August 1995
- Country: India
- Language: Malayalam

Aksharam (transl. Alphabet) is a 1995 Indian Malayalam film, directed by Sibi Malayil. The film stars Suresh Gopi, Annie, and Madhavi in lead roles. This film is noted for the first screen appearance of famous south Indian actor Kalabhavan Mani, who appeared in a cameo role as an auto rickshaw driver. The film has a musical score by Perumbavoor G Ravindranath. Gopi portrays a journalist, who loses everything for his job to find truth.

== Cast ==
- Suresh Gopi as Ananthakrishnan aka Ananthu
- Annie as Meenu
- Madhavi as Gayathri Devi
- Narendra Prasad as Krishna Moorthy
- Anju Aravind as Usha
- N. F. Varghese as Home minister Valappad Balakrishnan
- Tej Sapru as Ramji
- Jagathy Sreekumar as Tharakan
- Kalabhavan Mani (cameo) as Auto driver
- Jose Pellissery as Jayarajan, Minister's Secretary
- M. S. Thripunithura as Kunjikrishna Pothuval
- Kozhikode Narayanan Nair as Vaidyanathan
- Subadra as Kasthuriammal
- Santhakumari as Kunjikrishna Pothuval's wife
- Baby Sonia as Bindu Balakrishnan
- T. P. Madhavan as Madhava Menon
- K. R. Vatsala as Subadra
- Eliyas Babu as Madhavan
- Swapna Ravi as Radhamani
- Rajeev Rangan as Soman

== Soundtrack ==
The music was composed by Perumbavoor G. Ravindranath and the lyrics were written by Gireesh Puthenchery.

No.	Song	Singers	Lyrics	Length (m:ss)
1	"Navarasabhaavam"	K. J. Yesudas	Gireesh Puthenchery	
2	"Thankakkalabha" (pathos)	K. J. Yesudas	Gireesh Puthenchery	
3	"Thankakkalabhakumkumam"	K. J. Yesudas	Gireesh Puthenchery	
