= Mazhavilkoodaram =

- Directed by: Siddique Shameer
- Written by: Siddique Shameer
- Produced by: Thanoof Karim, P.K. Shamsuddeen; Prabhulla Chandran
- Starring: Rahman; Annie; Rajan P. Dev; Mala Aravindan; Idavela Babu; Zainuddin
- Cinematography: P. Sukumar
- Edited by: P.C. Mohanan
- Music by: S. Balakrishnan
- Distributed by: Thanoof Films Release
- Release date: March 1995
- Country: India
- Language: Malayalam

Mazhavilkoodaram (English: Rainbow Castle) (Malayalam:മഴവിൽകൂടാരം) is a 1995 Malayalam musical action film written and directed by Siddique Shameer, starring Rahman, Annie, Abi, Rajan P. Dev, Mala Aravindan, Idavela Babu, and Zainuddin.

== Plot ==
Jithu falls in love with his college mate Vinu. He thrashes a drug dealer to save his friend, but problems arise when he decides to take revenge against Jithu. The story deals with how he manages the situation.

== Cast ==
- Rahman as Jithin Babu (Jithu)
- Annie as Binu
- Abi as Sobhan Kumar
- Idavela Babu as Supru
- Nandu as Subair
- Madhu Menon as Siby Jacob
- Rajan P. Dev as Ram Saab
- Shiju as Suresh
- Silk Smitha as Rathi Teacher
- Zainuddin as Principal Azeez Ali
- Indrans as Sundareshan
- Mala Aravindan as Subair's Father
- Tony as a Politician Bhagath
- Gayathri
- Gomathi Mahadevan as Lakshmi, Jithin Babu's Mother
- Bindu Varappuzha as Neeta, Subair's lover
- Lishoy as Cherian, Police Officer
- Jagannatha Varma as Babu Pillai, Jithin Babu's Father
- Baburaj as Bhagheerathan, Gunda
- Joju George as Paul, College Student
