= Parvathy Parinayam =

- Directed by: PG Vishwambharan
- Written by: Mini
- Screenplay by: Shibu Chakravarthy
- Produced by: Antony Eastman
- Starring: Mukesh, Premkumar, Annie
- Cinematography: K. P. Nambiathiri
- Edited by: Sreekar prasad
- Music by: Rajamani
- Production company: Eastman pictures
- Distributed by: Gayathri release
- Release date: 1995
- Country: India
- Language: Malayalam

Parvathy Parinayam is a 1995 Indian Malayalam film, directed by PG Vishwambharan, starring Mukesh, Premkumar and Annie in the lead roles. It was a superhit comedy movie run over 80 days.

== Plot ==
Shivankutty arrives in a town as its new lineman, an employee of the electricity company. The townspeople are overjoyed that they finally have someone to repair the town's frequent electric outages. Shivankutty reconnects with his old friend from college Premachandran who teaches Malayalam at a local parallel college, owned and run by the town's most prominent family, the Thirumenis. Shivankutty decides to move in with Premachandran, who rents a house next door to a feisty lady named Subhadramma who is aggressively protective of her two teenage daughters Parvathy and Lakshmi. Both girls are Premachandran's students, and he develops a crush on the younger girl Lakshmi, while Parvathy and Shivankutty fall for each other. The story takes off from there and is set in the backdrop of the local temple festival and the reason for Subhadramma's attitude towards her daughters' suitors.

Subhadramma recounts the story of how, as a young woman, she fell in love with and married a lineman Narayanankutty, but he left her 18 years ago. He hasn't been heard from since, and Subhadramma wants to ensure the same fate doesn't befall her daughters. Meanwhile, Aniyan Thirumeni, the younger of the Thirumenis - a womanizer and a goon - gets into a fight with Shivankutty over unpaid electrical bills at the former's flour mill. That altercation escalates into a full-blown rivalry when the two clash again over funds for the annual temple festival. The townspeople decide to approach Narayankutty, who has returned to the village as a rich man, with a request to sponsor the festival. Aniyan Thirumeni convinces his elder brother and wife to approach Subhadramma for Parvathy's hand, both because he was once spurned by Parvathy and also to settle a score with Shivankutty. Parvathy refuses, and Subhadramma reveals that only Lakshmi is her biological daughter. Parvathy is Narayankutty's illegitimate daughter, whose mother commits suicide when Narayankutty refuses to accept her or the child. Subhadramma demands to know the truth, but Narayanankutty decides to leave in shame instead. Even when abandoned by her philandering husband, Subhadramma takes pity on her now-orphaned stepdaughter and adopts her.

Now that she knows the whole story, she is obligated to marry Aniyan Thampuran, and the date is set to coincide with the temple festival. Aniyan Thirumeni conspires to scuttle the festival with the help of hired thugs, but he is thwarted in the attempt by Shivankutty and gang. Parvathy and Shivankutty elope with the help of Lakshmi, Premachandran, and Narayanankutty. However, Lakshmi and Subhadramma are kidnapped by Aniyan Thampuran's thugs, and the eloping lovers are forced to return. In the climax, Aniyan Thampuran is beaten - literally and figuratively - and Subhadramma gives her blessings for Shivankutty and Parvathy's union.

== Cast ==
- Mukesh as Shivankutty
- Annie as Parvathy
- Premkumar as Premachandran
- Janardanan as Narayanankutty
- Anju Aravind as Lakshmi
- Zeenath as Subhadramma
- Indrans as Blackbelt Kumaran
- V. K. Sreeraman as Valiya Thirumeni
- Ajay Rathnam as Aniyan Thirumeni
- Bobby Kottarakkara
- Jose Pellissery as Panchayath President
- Harishree Ashokan as Beggar
- Kanakalatha as Savithri
- Kalpana as Kumaran's love interest
- Irshad as Adithyan

== Notes ==
The film also has a brilliant ensemble cast typical of Malayalam movies of the time. Jose Pellissery plays the panchayath president, and together with Bobby Kottarakkara as the local teashop owner provide comic relief. Indrans as Subhadramma's nephew and karate champion is not only an important ally to the young lovers but also provides many hilarious moments with Kalpana's cameo as his love interest. Harishree Ashokan plays a memorable 'town beggar' who is richer than the Panchayat president, still not above stealing a silver pot or two. His take on the popular song Humma Humma, which he twists into a beggars' rhyme became very popular after this movie became available on cable networks.
