= Kalyanji Anandji (film) =

- Directed by: Balu Kiriyath
- Written by: P H Hameed
- Screenplay by: Kaloor Dennis
- Produced by: Evershine pictures
- Starring: Mukesh; Harishree Ashokan; Annie
- Cinematography: Sreesankar
- Edited by: K Sankunni
- Music by: S. P. Venkatesh
- Production company: Evershine Pictures
- Distributed by: Evershine Release
- Release date: 1995
- Country: India
- Language: Malayalam

Kalyanji Anandji is a 1995 Indian Malayalam-language comedy film, directed by Balu Kiriyath, starring Mukesh, Harisree Ashokan and Annie in the lead roles. The film was commercially successful and remade in Tamil as Kavalai Padathe Sagodhara with Pandiarajan.

== Premise ==
Kalyanakrishnan, who hails from a Brahmin family, marries his girlfriend Mary Nirmala who is a Christian. Their life takes a turn when their parents learn about their relationship.

== Cast ==
- Mukesh as Kalyanakrishnan
- Harishree Ashokan as Anantharaman, Kalyanakrishnan's Brother
- Annie as Mary Nirmala / Shivakami, Kalyanakrishnan's Wife
- Sukumari as Kalyanakrishnan's Mother
- Cochin Haneefa as Vengalam Chakkunni / Adv. General Oorumadam Subbarama Iyer, Kalyanakrishnan's Friend
- Indrans as Maniyan, Anantharaman's Friend
- Mamukkoya as Balusherry Basheer / Swami Danthagopurananda Mouni Baba
- Narendra Prasad as Dr. Shankaran, Kalyanakrishnan's Brother
- V. K. Sreeraman as Girijavallabhan, Kalyanakrishnan's Brother
- Paravoor Bharathan as Shambho Mahadevan, Kalyanakrishnan's Brother
- Jose Pallissery as Lakshminarayanan, Kalyanakrishnan's Brother
- Shivaji as Seetharaman, Kalyanakrishnan's brother
- P. C. George as Mamangalam Mathachan, Mary Nirmala's Father
- Anila Sreekumar as Bhagyalakshmi, Maniyan's Love Interest
- Kanakalatha as Lakshminarayanan's Wife
- Priyanka Anoop as Seetharaman's Wife
- Ragini as Kanakam, Girijavallabhan's Wife
- Philomina as Chettathi
- Tony as Gopalakrishnan, Kalyanakrishnan's Friend
- Baburaj as Goonda
- James as Fr. John Ignatius
- Shabnam as Gopalakrishnan's Wife
