= Venugopal Madathil =

Indian photographer

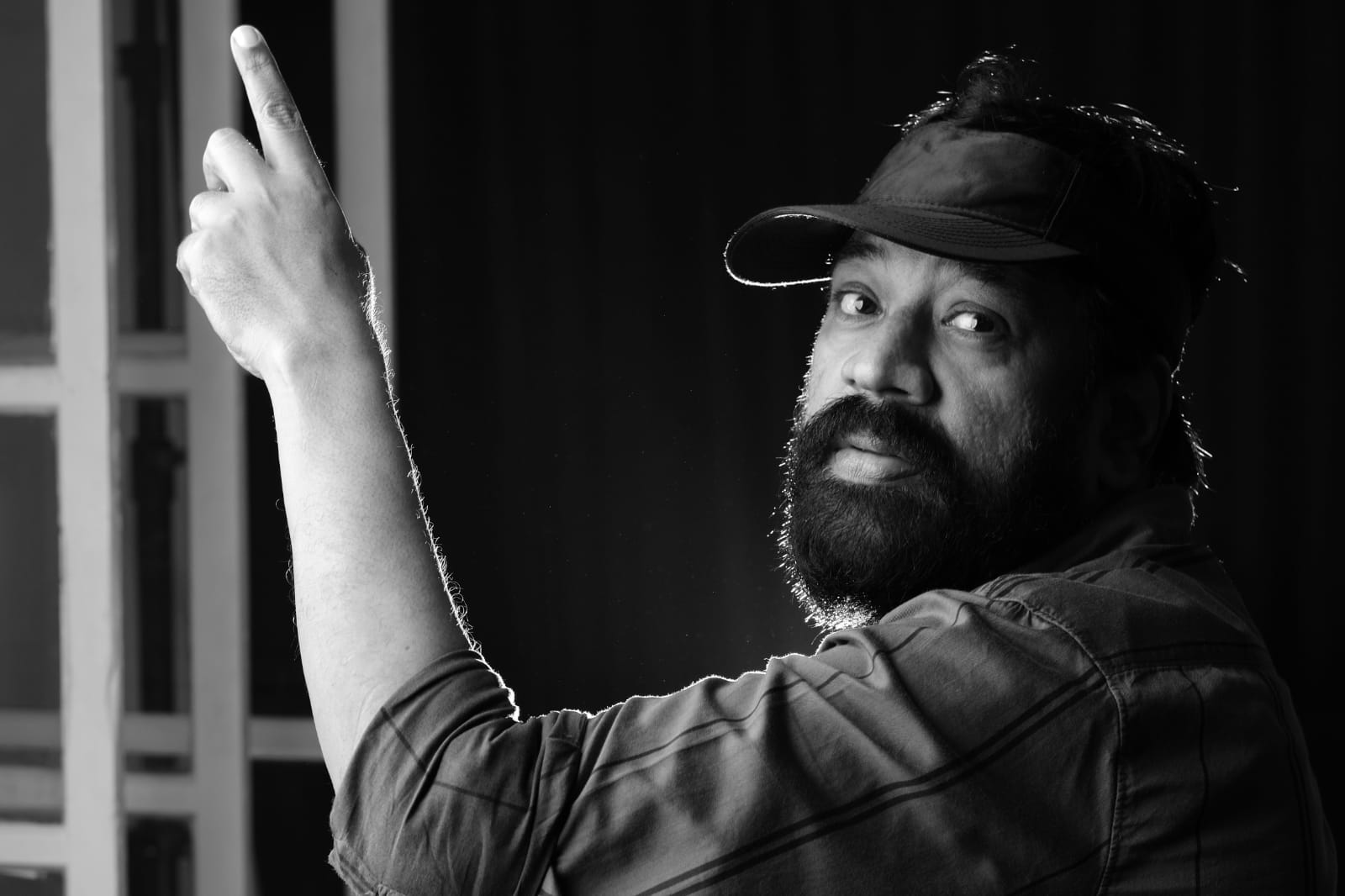
- Venugopal during a shoot (2014)
- Born: 5 June 1966 (age 60); Kozhikode, Kerala, India
- Citizenship: Indian
- Occupation: Cinematographer
- Father: Dr. M.N. Panicker
- Awards: 52nd Kerala State Film Awards

Venugopal Madathil (born 5 June 1966) is an Indian cinematographer. Across his career, he has produced over 75 films. Madathil has worked with the several prominent directors of Malayalam film industry, including Sibi Malayil, A. K. Lohithadas, Jayaraj, Kamal, V. M. Vinu, and Rajasenan. He has been involved with successful films such as Ente Veedu Appuvinteyum, Joker, Pallavur Devanarayanan, and Meghamalhar.

== Early life ==
Madathil is the son of Dr. M.N. Panicker. Although he pursued engineering studies, his true interests lay in cinematography and the film industry. His passion for photography flourished during his free time spent in his uncle's studio while pursuing his engineering degree.

== Career ==
After Madathil finished his studies, his father's close friend M. T. Vasudevan Nair introduced him to Jayanan Vincent. Madathil was appointed as Vincent's assistant for the next film "Uyaranagalil." Before he could enter the film industry, Madathil's father died. He put a temporary stop to his ambitions and returned home.

After a long interval he returned to the film industry as an assistant for Nair's film "Anubandam". He also worked as an independent cameraman for the Tamil film "Pournami Rojakkal." His first independent Malayalam film was Mr. Kaladharan's "Ellarum Chollanu."

Venugopal was jury member of the 52nd Kerala State Film Awards in 2021.

== Filmography ==
- Pouranmi Rojakkal
- Ellarum Chollanu
- Sudhinam
- Saadaram
- Three Men Army
- Aadyathe Kanmani
- Achan Rajavu Appan Jethavu
- Sathyabhamakkoru Premalekhanam
- Sundari Neeyum Sundaran Njanum
- Tom & Jerry (film)
- Padanayakan
- Swapna Lokathe Balabhaskaran
- Malayala Masom Chingam Onnu
- Ishtamanu Nooru Vattam
- Dilliwala Rajakumaran
- Sibiram(1997)
- Vamsam (1997 film)
- Kilukil Pambaram
- Mayaponman
- Snehasindooram
- Anuragakottaram
- Kusruthi Kuruppu
- HARTHAL
- Vismayam
- Ormacheppu
- Tokyo Nagarathile Viseshangal
- Pallavur Devanarayanan
- Vardhakya Puranam
- Tharavadu (film)
- Mayilattam (film)
- Njan Kodiswaran
- SHUDDHA MADDALAM
- Kinnaripuzhayoram
- Kaattile Thadi Thevarude Ana
- AAKASHATHEKKORU KILIVAATHIL
- Porutham
- Arayannangalude Veedu
- CHILLAKSHARANGAL
- Joker (2000 film)
- Nakshathragal Parayathirunnathu
- Aaraam Jaalakam
- Cover Story (2000 film)
- Megasandesam
- Ishtam (2001 Malayalam film)
- Meghamalhar
- Aayirathil Oruvan (2009 film)
- KADHA
- Mr. Brahmachari
- Ente Veedu Appuvinteyum
- Nammal
- Kakkakarumban
- Jalolsavam
- Alice in Wonderland (2005 film)
- Ravanan
- Ashwaroodan
- Aanachandam
- Amrutham
- 9 KK Road
- Black Cat (2007 film)
- College Kumaran
- Hareendran Oru Nishkalankan
- Panthaya Kozhi
- Rahasya Police
- Evaraina Epudaina
- Subapradam
- MANCHIVADU
- Cowboy (2013 film)
- BLACKBERRY
- GOOD BAD & UGLY
- Appavum Veenjum
- Marupadi
