= Vidyadharan =

P. S. Vidyadharan
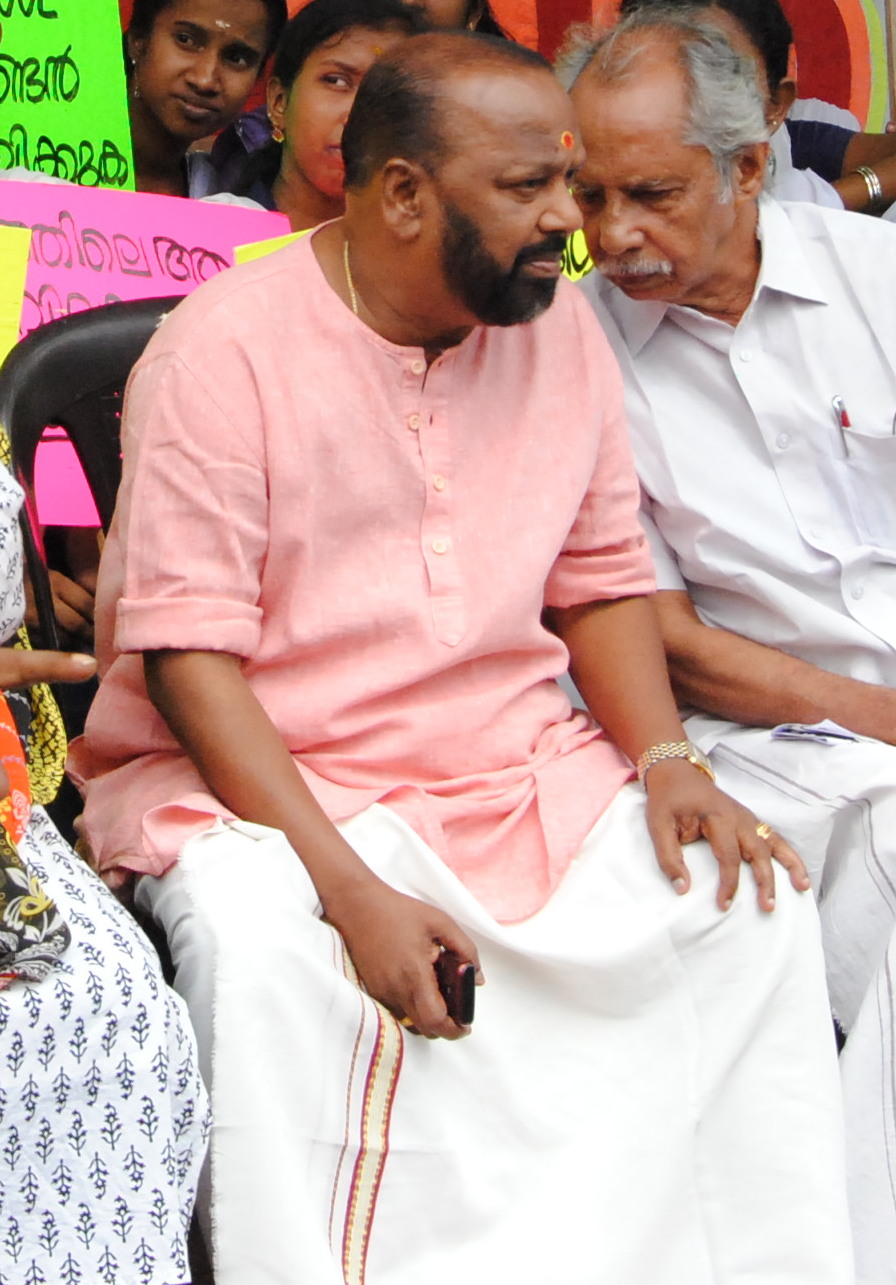
- Image of Vidyadharan

Background information
- Born: 6 March 1945 (age 81); Thrissur, Kerala, India
- Occupations: Music director; Playback singer
- Years active: 1963–present

P. S. Vidyadharan (popularly known as Vidyadharan master; Malayalam) is a music composer and playback singer who works in Malayalam cinema. In 2013, he completed 60 years of his musical career.

== Early life ==
Vidyadharan was born on 6 March 1945 to Sankaran and Thankamma in Arattupuzha, Thrissur, as their eldest son. He has six siblings, the youngest of them being the popular music director and singer Natesh Shankar and the second sibling is P.S. Ganeshan.

Vidyadharan learned classical music from his grandfather Kochakkan Asan, Irinjalakkuda Govindankutty Panicker, R. Vaidyanatha Bhagavathar, and Sankaranarayana Bhagavathar. To fulfil his desire of becoming a playback singer, he later moved to Chennai. Music director G. Devarajan gave him an opportunity to sing the song "Oh rikshaavaala" in the 1965 film Odayil Ninnu. Based on Devarajan's advice, Vidyadharan returned home to continue his studies. He also started singing for stage dramas during this period.

His wife's name is Leela. Daughter-Sangeetha Vidhyadharan and Son-Sajith Vidhyadharan, are his children. Sujaikumar J S is his son in law. Anila is his daughter in law. Devi, Devadatta, Krishnajith, and Krithika are his grandchildren.

== Music composer ==
Vidyadharan became an independent music director through the stage drama Baliyaadukal. He made his debut as film music director in the 1984 film Ente Gramam, directed by Sreemoolanagaram Vijayan. One of his popular songs, "Kalpantha kaalatholam", was composed for this film. "Nashtaswargangale" (Veena Poovu) and "Chandanam manakkunna" (Achuvettante Veedu) are among his other most popular film compositions.

In 2004, Vidyadharan received the Kerala Sangeetha Nataka Akademi Award. In 2017, Vidyadharan won the G. Devarajan Master Award, the Sarga-Sangeetha Prathibha Award, the Ranjith Kandaran Award, and the Mookambika Souparnikamrutham Award. In 2016, he received the Dakshinamoorthy Sangeetha Sumeru Award. In 2022, he received the Kerala Sangeetha Nataka Akademi Fellowship.

== Popular compositions ==
Song title	Movie	Lyricist	Singers	Notes
"Kalpantha kalatholam"	Ente Gramam	Sreemoolanagaram Vijayan	K. J. Yesudas	
"Nashtaswargangale"	Veena Poovu	Sreekumaran Thampi	K. J. Yesudas	
"Chandanam manakkunna"	Achuvettante Veedu	S. Ramesan Nair	K. J. Yesudas	
"Paduvanay vannu ninte"	Ezhuthappurangal	O. N. V. Kurup	K. J. Yesudas	
"Vinninte virimaril mazhavillin"	Ashtapadi	P. Bhaskaran	K. J. Yesudas	
"Thaloam paithal"	Ezhuthappurangal	O. N. V. Kurup	K. S. Chithra	
"Ambalamillathe"	Padamudra	Kudappanakkunnu Hari	K. J. Yesudas	
"Swapnangalokkeyum pankuvekkam"	Kaanan Kothichu	P. Bhaskaran	K. J. Yesudas	
"Aaru nee en vazhi"	Akashaparavakal	O. N. V. Kurup	K. J. Yesudas	
"Nrithyathi Nrithyathi"	Radha Madhavam	O. N. V. Kurup	M. G. Sreekumar	

== Discography ==
=== Film discography ===
Year	Film title	Language	Notes
1980	Aagamanam	Malayalam	Debut film
1983	Ashtapadi	Malayalam	
1983	Veenapoovu	Malayalam	
1984	Ente Gramam	Malayalam	
1987	Chanthayil Choodi Vilikkunna Pennu	Malayalam	
1987	Achuvettante Veedu	Malayalam	
1987	Kaanan Kothichu	Malayalam	
1987	Ezhuthapurangal	Malayalam	
1988	Paadha Mudra	Malayalam	
1988	Aakasa Paravakal	Malayalam	
1988	Indulekha	Malayalam	
1989	Thadavarayile Raajaakkanmaar	Malayalam	
1989	Utharam	Malayalam	
1989	Miss Pameela	Malayalam	
1989	Ormakkurippu	Malayalam	
1989	Illikkaadum Chellakkaattum	Malayalam	
1990	Nammude Naadu	Malayalam	
1990	Radha Madhavam	Malayalam	
1990	Medakkattu	Malayalam	
1991	Utharakaandam	Malayalam	
1992	Chuvapputhaalam	Malayalam	
1992	Aanachantham	Malayalam	

=== Independent album discography ===
- Alakananda Theeram
