= 45th Filmfare Awards South =

Award ceremony for South Indian films

- Date: 13 June 1998
- Site: Mammoth Kamraj Hall, Madras, Tamil Nadu, India

The 45th Filmfare Awards South ceremony honouring the winners and nominees of the best of South Indian cinema films released in 1997, was an event that was held at the Mammoth Kamraj Hall, Madras 13 June 1998.

== Main awards ==
=== Kannada cinema ===
Best Film	Best Director
Amrutha Varshini	T. S. Nagabharana – Nagamandala
Best Actor	Best Actress
Ramesh Aravind – Amrutha Varshini	Vijayalakshmi – Nagamandala
Best Music Director
Deva – Amrutha Varshini

=== Malayalam cinema ===
Best Film	Best Director
Bhoothakkannadi	Jayaraj – Kaliyattam
Best Actor	Best Actress
Mammootty – Bhoothakkannadi	Manju Warrier – Kaliyattam Aaraam Pathren
Best Music Director
Kaithapram Damodaran Namboothiri – Kaliyattam

=== Tamil cinema ===
Best Film	Best Director
Iruvar	Cheran – Bharathi Kannamma
Best Actor	Best Actress
R. Sarathkumar - Suryavamsam	Meena – Bharathi Kannamma
Best Music Director
A. R. Rahman – Minsara Kanavu

=== Telugu cinema ===
Best Film	Best Director
Annamayya	K. Raghavendra Rao - Annamayya
Best Actor	Best Actress
Nagarjuna – Annamayya	Vijayashanti - Osey Ramulamma
Best Music Director
Vandemataram Srinivas - Osey Ramulamma

== Technical Awards ==
Best Choreography: Brinda – from Preminchukundam Raa	Best Cinematography: Santhosh Sivan – Iruvar	Best Playback Singer: Mano - Pelli (for "Rukku Rukku Rukkumani")

== Special awards ==
Lifetime Achievement: S. Janaki; Nedumudi Venu	Filmfare Award for Best Female Debut - South: Simran - Nerukku Ner, Once More, VIP

== Awards Presentation ==
- Brinda (Best Choreography) Received Award from Khushbu
- Mano (Best Playback Singer) Received Award from K. T. Kunjumon
- Simran (Best Debut) Received Award from Nagma
- B Jayshree Devi (Best Film Kannada) Received Award from Priyadarshan
- Sibi Malayil Receives N. Krishnakumar Award (Best Film Malayalam) from G Venkateswaran
- V Doraiswamy Raju (Best Film Telugu) Received Award from Balu Mahendra
- P Henry (Best Film Tamil) Received Award from Suresh Krishna
- T. S. Nagabharana (Best Director Kannada) Received Award from R B Chowdhry
- Jayaraj (Best Director Malayalam) Received Award from Parthiban
- K S Prakash Receives Raghavendra Rao Award (Best Director Telugu) from Suriya
- Cheran (Best Director Tamil) Received Award from Prabhu
- Deva (Best Music Director Kannada) Received Award from Gemini Ganeshan
- Kaithapram Damodaran Namboothiri (Best Music Director Malayalam) Received Award from Prashanth
- Vandemataram Srinivas (Best Music Director Telugu) Received Award from Vineeth
- A. R. Rahman (Best Music Director Tamil) Received Award from K. Balachander
- Vijayalakshmi (Best Actress Kannada) Received Award from Shilpa Shetty
- Manju Warrier (Best Actress Malayalam) Received Award from Sonali Bendre
- Preity Zinta Receives Vijayashanti's Award (Best Actress Telugu) from Prabhu Deva
- Meena's Father Receives her award (Best Actress Tamil) from Jaya Prada
- Ramesh Aravind (Best Actor Kannada) Received Award from Boney Kapoor
- Dulquer Salman receives Mammootty's Award (Best Actor Malayalam) from Sridevi
- Nagarjuna (Best Actor Telugu) Received Award from Tabu and Akshay Kumar
- R. Sarathkumar (Best Actor Tamil) Received Award from Rekha and Karishma Kapoor
