= Dasharatham =

- Poster
- Directed by: Sibi Malayil
- Written by: A. K. Lohithadas
- Produced by: Saga Appachan
- Starring: Mohanlal; Rekha
- Cinematography: Venu
- Edited by: L. Bhoominathan
- Music by: Johnson
- Production company: Saga Films
- Distributed by: Saga Films
- Release date: 28 October 1989
- Running time: 157 minutes
- Country: India
- Language: Malayalam

Dasharatham is a 1989 Indian Malayalam-language drama film written by A. K. Lohithadas and directed by Sibi Malayil. It stars Mohanlal, Rekha, Murali, Nedumudi Venu, Sukumaran, Karamana Janardanan Nair, Sukumari, Kaviyoor Ponnamma, K. P. A. C. Lalitha, and Jayabharathi. The music was composed by Johnson. The movie deals with the subject of traditional surrogacy. This is the first Malayalam film to introduce 35mm CinemaScope Film Format. The film was released on October 28, 1989, on the occasion of Diwali.

Dasharatham is widely regarded as one of the best films from the writer-director duo Lohithadas-Sibi Malayil. Lohithadas won the Kerala Film Critics Award for Best Scriptwriter. Dasharatham was the first Malayalam film officially dubbed and released in Marathi as Mazaa Mulga (Meaning: My son).

== Plot ==
Rajiv Menon is born into extreme wealth and is an alcoholic playboy with absolutely no aim in life. With no parents to guide him and with the family business being run by a trusted manager Pillai, Rajiv is free to waste his life and money on drinks and debauchery. A close friend Scariah with his wife and children come over to stay at Rajiv's mansion for a week. Soon Rajiv gets attached to one of Scariah's children and decides that he wants to have a child of his own, but neither does he want to get married nor does he want to adopt a baby.

One of his good friends, guide and philosopher Dr. Hameed, advises Rajiv to find a surrogate for artificial insemination. They come across a former football player Chandradas who is in dire need of money for an operation, his wife Annie agrees to give birth to Rajiv's child through traditional surrogacy. Both Chandradas and Annie aren't happy about the decision – it's clearly a desperate solution to their financial needs.

At first Annie just wants to complete surrogate pregnancy, hand over the baby and move on. Meanwhile, Rajiv becomes highly invested in the pregnancy, reading up books on pregnancy, childbirth and making sure that Annie receives nursing care and proper diet to support a healthy baby. He grows deeply attached to the prospect of having a child, the thought of finally having someone he can call his own. But by the time of the child's birth, and also being its biological mother, Annie develops an emotional attachment to the baby and refuses to surrender the child.

Finally Rajiv hands over the child to Annie very reluctantly. In the climax, Rajiv asks the maid Maggie, whether every mother has an attachment to her child like Annie has. Rajiv asks Maggie if she can love him as if she would her own son. Maggie is dumbfounded while Rajiv walks off distraught and in tears without waiting for an answer.

== Cast ==
- Mohanlal as Rajiv Menon
- Rekha as Annie
- Murali as Chandradas, Annie's husband
- Nedumudi Venu as Stephen
- Sukumaran as Dr. Hameed
- Karamana Janardanan Nair as Manager Krishnan Pillai
- Sukumari as Maggie
- Kaviyoor Ponnamma as Chandradas's mother
- Jayabharathi as Dr. Zeenath
- K. P. A. C. Lalitha as Mariyamma
- M. S. Thripunithura as Adv. Govindan
- Kollam Thulasi as Advocate Santhosh Menon
- Jagannathan as Sankaran Nair
- Vineeth Kumar as Joseph
- Bobby Kottarakkara as Babu, office staff
- Ajay Mathias as Baby

== Soundtrack ==
All lyrics are written by Poovachal Khader; all music is composed by Johnson.

| No. | Title | Artist(s) | Length |
|---|---|---|---|
| 1. | "Chinchilam Thenmozhi" | M. G. Sreekumar |
| 2. | "Mandaara Cheppundo" | M. G. Sreekumar, K. S. Chithra |

== Accolades ==
Kerala Film Critics Association Awards

- Best Screenplay – A. K. Lohithadas
- Best Actress – Rekha

Cinema Express Award

- Best Actress (Malayalam) – Rekha

Filmfare Award for Best Actress – Malayalam
