= Bhoothakkannadi =

- Poster
- Directed by: A. K. Lohithadas
- Written by: A. K. Lohithadas
- Produced by: N. Krishnakumar (Kireedam Unni) (producer); Praveen Prem (executive producer); Sharika S. (executive producer); K. Sukruth (executive producer)
- Starring: Mammootty
- Cinematography: Venu
- Edited by: G. Murali
- Music by: Johnson (Songs + Score); Kaithapram (Lyrics)
- Release date: 18 April 1997
- Running time: 115 minutes
- Country: India
- Language: Malayalam

Bhoothakkannadi (English:Magnifying glass) is a 1997 Malayalam psychological drama film written and directed by A. K. Lohithadas in his directorial debut. It tells the story of Vidyadharan (Mammootty), a clockmaker, and his inability to deal with the harsh realities of life. Despite being a box office failure, the movie was critically acclaimed and is often regarded as a classic in Malayalam cinema. Lohithadas won the Indira Gandhi Award for Best Debut Film of a Director for Bhoothakkannadi at the National Film Awards. It won the Kerala State Film Award for Best Film in 1997. The film won two Filmfare Awards South. Lohithadas also won the Padmarajan Award for his script.

== Plot ==
The movie opens with Vidyadharan serving time in a prison.

During a flashback it is revealed that Vidyadharan, a small village clocksmith and a widower, lived with his only daughter. His wife died from a snakebite years ago. However, his childhood friend and love interest Sarojini lives next to his house. Sarojini's husband left her after spending just a single night with her, leaving her with a teenage daughter. Vidyadharan is phobic of snakes possibly due to his wife's death. He carries a flashlight through the village lanes even in broad daylight.

Although Vidyadharan's extended family disapproves of his on-off relationship with Sarojini, his daughter and Sarojini's daughter are like sisters. We are introduced to a host of supporting characters in the sleepy Palakkadan hamlet like Vidyadaran's sister, his friend near his watch repairing shop, the drunkard who carries a rifle, etc.

Their simple world in the sleepy hamlet is turned upside down one day when Sarojini's teenage daughter goes missing. After much investigation, her body is found inside a cave on a hilltop. It is revealed that she was gang raped. There is no evidence pointing to anyone: yet another case of sexual offence against girls in the area.

Vidyadharan feels that it is a drunk hunter who is behind the crime. The police in the meanwhile investigate and declare the hunter to be innocent. Vidyadharan confronts the hunter and a battle of words ensue between them. During the confrontation, Vidyadharan accidentally kills the hunter and is sent to prison.

He leads a calm life inside the prison campus and is a pet of the jail warden. While Sarojini visits Vidyadharan frequently, his daughter had been taken away by her mother's family.

During one of her visits, Sarojini tells him that she met Vidyadharan's daughter and that she has grown up. He wishes to meet her but is informed that her mother's family will not give her permission to do so. During the visit, Sarojini also apprises Vidyadharan about the increasing number of rapes and molestations and recounts the fate of her daughter. Vidyadharan is visibly disturbed by this social scenario, more so as his daughter is growing up in such a society. He starts developing the anxiousness and insecurity of a father of an adolescent girl.

Vidyadharan's release date comes nearer. During one of Sarojini's visit, he tells her that, upon release, he would go to a land far away with Sarojini and his daughter and will live happily. He entrusts Sarojini the job of bringing his daughter from her maternal home after convincing her. Sarojini agrees.

As the day of his release nears, Vidyadharan is happy and roams around the jail. During his regular afternoon strolls, to his surprise, Vidyadharan find a hole in the thick jail wall. Vidyadharan tactfully clears the hole and uses his magnifying lens to check if he is able to view something. To his luck, he finds that the eyesize hole is dug through the entire thickness and he is able to see the hilltop just outside the jail. Vidyadharan is amused but is careful not to let the inmates and constables know about it, especially with his release date being so close.

During his free time, Vidyadharan sees the small family of blind singers living on the hilltop and their beautiful daughter. He sees their small-time existence and how beautifully they sing. He finds that one of the jail constables is intervening in their life, telling them to move out of the place. When Vidyadharan meets this constable inside the jail, he is unable to express his anger. He recollects the misbehaviour of the same man once Sarojini visited him. Vidyadharan concludes that the constable is not a good man.

Another day Vidyadharan witnesses a celebration in the small hut of blind singers. It is revealed that the beautiful daughter has become adolescent. Vidyadharan is very happy as his own daughter would be of the same age.

As he looks on another day, while the beautiful teenage girl is alone in the hut, he sees the cruel policeman going inside. This is followed by the girl's shrieks and violent cry for help. As she comes running outside, Vidyadharan sees the police constable chasing her like a mad dog. Vidyadharan tries to seek help, but his voice is not heard. Stranded within the campus, Vidyadharan is totally helpless.

The blind singers come back home to find the shocking news. They are shattered and, in the heat of loss they suffered, they decide to punish themselves by setting fire to the house and themselves. Vidyadharan watches as the silent spectator.

The next morning the constable comes in front of the inmates for checking. Vidyadharan has lost all control by now and he attacks the constable accusing him of the life of the three innocent people. The inmates and the jail warden run in. Vidyadharan shows the hole and describes the entire episode to the jailer. The jailer hears in disbelief and orders both Vidyadharan and the constable to be taken for medical aid.

The jailer inspects the hole and feels sorry for Vidyadharan. As he leaves, the camera zooms in towards the hole and reveals nothing but brick. The hole and the entire episode was an imagination of Vidyadharan's turbulent state of mind.

As Sarojini comes to the jail with Vidyadharan's daughter, he has a blank face, turns towards them and asks "Aara?" [Who are you?]. The movie concludes with the aerial shot of a train departing from the station.

== Cast ==
- Mammootty as Vidyadharan Nair
- Sreelakshmi as Sarojini
- Cherthala Lalitha as Sarada, Vidyadharan's sister
- Sindhu Shyam as Minikutty, Sarojini's daughter
- Remya as Srikutty, Vidyadharan's daughter
- Rizabawa as prison warden
- Srihari as Hunter
- Preingottu Vijayan as Sarada's husband
- Kalabhavan Mani as Ayyappan
- M. R. Gopakumar as Balakrishnan
- Chali Pala as Chacko
- Kavya Madhavan as Meenu, Blind Singer's daughter

== Production ==
=== Development ===
Lohithadas initially got the idea for the script after being disturbed by the casual attitude of people towards the sexual exploitation of small girls by men. The idea of a watch repairer was not his original intention, he only wanted the story to be that of an overthinking father. However, one day, while on a walk, he saw a watch repairer intensely looking at a watch. This gave him the idea of a watch repairer. When Lohithadas narrated the script to Mammootty, he was instantly hooked to the narrative. Mammootty wanted role. However, the project never took off. Eventually, the writer Lohithadas himself directed the film with Mammootty in the lead. The film was bankrolled by N. Krishnakumar, who had earlier produced several films scripted by Lohithadas. Lal Jose worked as an associate director in the film.

What has shocked me of late is the attitude of people towards even small girls of twelve or thirteen. They are looked upon as just sex objects by men. It horrified me a lot to read such stories in the newspapers. I have no daughters, only two sons. And I long for a daughter. I began asking many of my friends about their daughters. All of them get a fear in their mind when they see their daughters growing up. All fathers are scared about the safety of their daughters. Then, I thought of telling a story about the fears of a father for his daughter. That was where it all began.

— A. K. Lohithadas, Rediff.

=== Casting ===
When discussions about casting Sarojini began, several members of the crew suggested Sreelakshmi for the role. Sreelakshmi was, at the time acting in a serial called Maranam Durbalam for DD Malayalam. Lohithadas liked the suggestion and asked for Jose's opinion. He also agreed. A screen test was conducted. However, Venu and Mammootty thought that she wasn't suitable for the role and recommended Sukanya for the role. She had earlier worked with Lohithadas and Mammootty in Sagaram Sakshi (1994). However, several members of the crew were apprehensive as Sreelakshmi's skin tone matched the color and body nature of Sarojini that had been written. After two to three days of shooting, due to an emergency Sukanya had to leave for Chennai. This meant that Sreelakshmi was selected for the part. After watching her perform Mammootty reportedly told Lal Jose that it was good that Sukanya left.

== Reception ==
Jayalakshmi K. from Deccan Herald wrote that "Mammootty is excellent in his portrayal of Mani. Srilakshmi as Sarojam is a natural. The movie is a thorough piece of work — the dialogue, the nuances, the emotions, settings and direction. Perhaps the filmmakers did go through it with a Bhoothakannadi".

== Awards ==
National Film Awards

Bhoothakkannadi won the Indira Gandhi Award for Best Debut Film of a Director at the 45th National Film Awards. The citation for the award stated, for the director's competent handling of the delicate balance of the human psyche.

Kerala State Film Awards

Bhoothakkannadi received three awards at the 1997 Kerala State Film Awards.

- Kerala State Film Award for Best Film
- Kerala State Film Award for Best Screenplay - A.K. Lohithadas
- Kerala State Film Award for Second Best Actress - Sreelakshmi

45th Filmfare Awards South

Bhoothakkannadi received two awards at 45th Filmfare Awards South.

- Best Film - Malayalam
- Best Actor - Malayalam - Mammootty
