= Dhanam (1991 film) =

1991 film directed by Sibi Malayil

- Directed by: Sibi Malayil
- Written by: A. K. Lohithadas
- Produced by: M. M. Ramachandran (Atlas Ramachandran)
- Starring: Mohanlal; Murali; Charmila; Thilakan; Nassar; Nedumudi Venu; Zeenath; Babu Namboothiri
- Cinematography: S. Kumar
- Edited by: L. Bhoominathan
- Music by: Songs: Raveendran; Score: Johnson
- Production company: Chandrakanth Films
- Distributed by: Chandrakanth Release
- Release date: 8 February 1991
- Country: India
- Language: Malayalam

Dhanam (transl. Wealth) is a Malayalam language action thriller film released in 1991. Directed by Sibi Malayil, this film had a strong casting line including Mohanlal, Murali, Thilakan, Nedumudi Venu, Charmila, Zeenath and Kaviyoor Ponnamma. The script was done by A. K. Lohithadas. The film features a musical score by Johnson and songs by Raveendran.

== Plot ==
Sivasankaran Nair is a young aspiring middle class medical representative with his home and other properties under mortgage (for a loan taken by his deceased father). He lives with his mother and sister. His dream is to earn more money and build a bigger home after repaying the loans. His neighbor and close childhood friend is Abubacker, who is a taxi driver. Siva usually travels with his friend. On one occasion, they accept a trip to carry a dead body at night for more money. While returning, the taxi breaks down near a beach and they decide to spend the night in the car. Siva gets a dream wherein the corpse comes alive and asks for a match. Siva convinces Abu that the car smells of the corpse and they decide to stay on the beach. Coincidentally, they overhear a smuggler trio talking about why they were not able to deliver the goods today. They tip the Customs department to get a monetary reward. After the Customs department catches the smugglers red-handed, they get a reward of 20 lakhs. But the smuggler, Stephen who loses the contraband learns about the informant from inside sources. He decides to kill the informant for the loss. His associates try to kill both Siva and Abu on their way back after receiving the reward.

Siva and Abu decide to stay in a Hotel with the money before depositing it in a bank. Siva unknowingly stays in the same hotel as Stephen, whereas Abu returns home. On seeing Siva, Stephen and his henchmen try to kill him. Siva runs with money for cover. At the end of the fight that ensues, they shoot Siva as he jumps off a bridge into a river.

Local Police constable Rajappan, lives with his wife Lakshmi and his sister-in-law Thankam/ Snehalatha. Siva resurfaces in their upper balcony of home. When she runs for cover from a sexual advance made by her sister's husband, Thankam sees Siva and helps him to hide. She feeds him and helps him to remove the bullet. They both get to know each other. Siva tells his story to Thankam and that after struggling for life and food for 3 days in hiding, he realizes the value of life and the idiocy in running behind money. He also tells that it is because of her compassion and empathy that he survived. Meanwhile, Police Constable Rajappan batters his wife over a missing alcohol bottle which was used for Siva while removing the bullet. Stephen reaches Siva's house to enquire about him. He reaches out to Abu on information from Sivasnakar's brother.

Stephen enquires about Siva and Abu says that their aim was to only make some money and that he wouldn't reveal the whereabouts of Siva, even if he dies. Stephen lets him go and follows him. Siva sends a letter via Thankam to Abu for a meeting. Thankam's father slaps her when she returns for going away without informing the family members and coming home late. Thankam manages to pass the message from Siva. Abu comes to meet Siva in the cover of darkness. Siva explains his position that he never ran with the money. Abu tells him that he believes him and doesn't want the money and informs him on arranging a train ticket the next day for leaving the place with the money. Siva asks Abu to take care of his family. Before leaving, Thankam asks Sivan to take her along with him to escape her brother-in-law. In the middle of the night, Rajappan arrives home and on seeing Thankam alone, he tries to take advantage of her. Siva interferes and saves her. On seeing the fight, furious Thankam's father attacks Rajappan and sends him out of the house. Siva leaves for the railway station with a promise of returning to marry Thankam.

As Stephen was losing patience, he asks Abu about Siva's whereabouts. He refuses to divulge the information and Abu is murdered. On the way to the railway station, Siva finds the taxi with Abu's dead body inside. Stephen and his associates attack him. In retaliation, Siva kills Stephen. The movie ends with a devastated Siva holding his friend's dead body and open briefcase of money (Dhanam) that is flying around.

== Cast ==
- Mohanlal as Sivasankaran Nair
- Murali as Aboobacker/Abu
- Charmila as Thankam/Snehalatha
- Nassar as Stephen
- Kaviyoor Ponnamma as Sivasankaran's mother
- Thilakan as Thankams father
- Nedumudi Venu as Rajappan
- Zeenath as Lekshmi, Rajappan's wife
- Babu Namboothiri as Balan
- Oduvil Unnikrishnan as Menon
- Santha Devi as Aboobacker's mother
- Indrans as Sasidharan

== Music ==
The score was composed by Johnson and the songs of this film were composed by Raveendran, with lyrics penned by P. K. Gopi.

| Track | Song title | Singer(s) | Raga |
|---|---|---|---|
| 1 | "Aanaykkeduppath" | K. J. Yesudas | Shanmukhapriya |
| 2 | "Cheerapoovukal" | K. S. Chithra | Yamuna Kalyani |
| 3 | "Nee Vidaparayumbol" | K. J. Yesudas | Shivaranjani |

== Box office ==
Dhanam was a superhit and one of the highest grossing Malayalam films of 1991.
