= Vicharana =

- Directed by: Sibi Malayil
- Written by: A. K. Lohithadas
- Produced by: Ranjini (Tharangini Films)
- Starring: Mammootty; Sobhana; Nedumudi Venu; Seema; Mukesh
- Cinematography: S. Kumar
- Edited by: L. Bhoominathan
- Music by: Ouseppachan
- Production companies: KSFDC, Chithranjali
- Distributed by: Tharangini Films
- Release date: 15 January 1988
- Country: India
- Language: Malayalam

Vicharana(transl. Trial)is a 1988 Malayalam film written by A. K. Lohithadas and directed by Sibi Malayil. The film stars Mammootty, Sobhana, Nedumudi Venu, Seema, Mukesh, Jagathy Sreekumar and Prathapachandran.

== Plot ==
The story is about the problems faced by a lawyer in his personal, social and professional lives when he undertakes the murder case of a trade union leader in which his brother-in-law is the main accused.

A strike is going on at Govindan Nair's factory headed by union leader Johny and activist Kabeer. They approach Advocate Sethumadhavan, an upright and idealistic young lawyer for advice. Sethumadhavan' s father was also a party activist and eloped with his mother from Govindan Nair's family. Sethu is sympathetic to the party cause and supports them. He is married to his childhood sweetheart and his uncle Govindan Nair's daughter Anita. Govindan Nair holds a grudge against Sethu for this and his jealous and disapproving of his professional excellence coming from humble beginnings. Govindan Nair and his son Raghu influence the union leader Kuttappan to break the strike. He tries for a compromise with other party members, but Johny does not agree to this as he feels they are nearing victory and the management will agree to their fair demands. Kuttappan and Raghu conspire to bring Johny out of the way to end the strike. One night Kuttappan brings him out of home at the pretext of some meeting and Raghu kills him. When the case comes to court, Govindan Nair and Raghu approaches Sethu to get him defend Raghu at court. Sethu refuses and lets them know that he will be arguing on behalf of the trade union as the prosecution. Govindan Nair and Raghu are enraged and leave.

Kuttappan rapes Johny' s widow Alice one night after trying to approach her for some days. She ends up being a prostitute to support their baby and her ailing mother. At the initial court hearing, Kuttappan turns hostile witness and sides with Govindan Nair and changes his statement that he is not sure its Raghu himself who committed the crime. Before the second argument session, Govindan Nair and Raghu comes to see Anita and coax her into passing Sethu's argument notes to them to gain some time for Raghu's case. Sethu slaps Anita upon knowing this from her and asks her to leave. At court he is not able to present a convincing argument to prove Raghu guilty and court acquits him. To separate his daughter and Sethu, Govindan Nair gets her to shift to their relatives' house in Singapore, lying to her that Sethu is not interested to live with her anymore. Kabir and the other party members are furious at Sethu and thinks that he sided with his relatives to let Raghu escape the punishment.

When Sethu goes one night to visit Alice on her son's birthday, Kuttappan conspires to gather the neighborhood people and humiliate Sethu, which results in a police case for him for having engaged in immoral traffic. Govindan Nair uses Kuttappan to file a complaint against Sethu at the Bar association accusing him to have conspired with the defendant party and cheat the case. Adv. Krishnamoorthy who was Govindan Nair's advocate for Raghu's case tries to save Sethu during the sitting, but he takes responsibility for everything, not wanting to drag Anita into the matter. On coming back, he receives the divorce notice from Anita. Kabir and the party members later come and apologize to Sethu with Alice and promises to raise Johny' s son with care. A tired and defeated Sethu decides to travel for some days with his assistant Ramettan. On the day of their travel, Anita comes to Sethu's house from Singapore to patch up, when Ramettan realized that she had never filed for a divorce, and it was Govindan Nair's foul play to send divorce notice to both the parties posing as the other to split them up. Ramettan takes Anita inside home to meet Sethu, only to find Sethu having committed suicide. The movie ends with Anita breaking down at Sethu's feet.

== Cast ==
- Mammootty as Adv. Sethumadhavan
- Sobhana as Anita, Sethumadhavan's wife
- Nedumudi Venu as Ramettan, Sethumadhavan's scribe and assistant
- Mukesh as Kabeer, a trade union activist
- Jagathy Sreekumar as Kuttappan, a trade union leader
- Lalu Alex as Joji, a trade union leader
- Seema as Alice, Johny's wife
- Prathapachandran as Govindan Nair, Anita's father
- Sreenath as Raghu, Anita's brother
- Sukumari as Sarasathi Amma, Anita's mother
- Oduvil Unnikrishnan as Adv. Krishnamurthy
- James as a junior advocate

== Soundtrack ==
- "Oru Poo Viriyunna (Version 1)" - M. G. Sreekumar
- "Oru Poo Viriyunna (Version 2)" - M. G. Sreekumar
