= Ishtam (2001 Malayalam film) =

2001 film by Sibi Malayil

- Directed by: Sibi Malayil
- Written by: Kalavoor Ravikumar
- Produced by: David Kachappally
- Starring: Dileep; Navya Nair; Nedumudi Venu; Jayasudha; Innocent; Sreenivasan
- Cinematography: Venugopal
- Edited by: L. Bhoominathan
- Music by: Mohan Sitara
- Release date: 27 October 2001
- Running time: 158 minutes
- Country: India
- Language: Malayalam

Ishtam (transl. Love ) is a 2001 Indian Malayalam-language romantic comedy-drama film directed by Sibi Malayil and written by Kalavoor Ravikumar. It stars Dileep and Navya Nair (in her debut film), with Nedumudi Venu, Innocent, Sreenivasan, and Jayasudha appearing in supporting roles. The music was composed by Mohan Sitara. Ishtam was remade in Hindi as Mere Baap Pehle Aap by Priyadarshan.

== Plot ==
Pawan, whose mother died twenty four years ago when he was a child, lives with his father Krishnankutty Menon, a rich businessman. His father frequently and hilariously gets in trouble with the police officer Mariamma, mostly due to his best friend, Narayanan. Anjana meets Pavan whom she was ragged by and made her cut her hair due to which she left the college. So, she plans to take sweet revenge by making a false call. After all those fun incidents, Anjana meets Pavan who regrets the mischief he had done and then, they become friends. Anjana lives with a spinster music teacher, Sridevi. At Anjana's friend's marriage, Krishnankutty Menon meets Sridevi, and it turns out that Krishnankutty Menon and Sridevi were star-crossed lovers when they were young. Pavan, Anjana, Narayanan, and Pavan's brother, Vipin, plan to reunite them after all these years. In the process, Pavan and Anjana discover their feelings for each other as well.

== Cast ==
- Dileep as Pavan K Menon (Pavi)
- Navya Nair as Anjana Pillai (Rose), Pavi's childhood friend later pavan's love interest
- Nedumudi Venu as Krishnankutty Menon, Pavi's and Vipin's father
- Jayasudha as Sreedevi Teacher
- Sreenivasan as Vipin K Menon,Pavi's elder brother
- Innocent as Narayanan, Krishnankutty's friend
- Balachandra Menon as Gokul Das Pillai, Anjana's father
- Suma Jayaram as Girija Menon
- Jyothirmayi as Jyothi
- Kalpana as CI Mariamma Thomas
- Arun Ghosh as Jyothi's husband
- Deepika Mohan as Jyothi's mother
- Niyas Backeras Babukuttan
- Bindhu Krishna

== Soundtrack ==
The film's soundtrack contains eight songs, all composed by Mohan Sitara and lyrics by Kaithapram Damodaran Namboothiri and Sachidanandan Puzhankara.

| # | Title | Singer(s) | Lyrics | Raga(s) |
|---|---|---|---|---|
| 1 | "Chanchala Druthapada" | K. S. Chitra | Kaithapram | Brindabani Sarang |
| 2 | "Ishtam Ishtam" | Chorus | Kaithapram | Chorus |
| 3 | "Kaliparayum" | Sunil Viswachaithanya | Kaithapram | Sunil |
| 4 | "Kandu Kandu" | Dhanya | Kaithapram | Kapi |
| 5 | "Kandu Kandu" | Dr. K. J. Yesudas | Kaithapram | Kapi |
| 6 | "Kanumbol Parayamo" | Dr. K. J. Yesudas, K. S. Chitra | Sachidanandan Puzhankara | Kalyani |
| 7 | "Kanumbol Parayamo" | Dr. K. J. Yesudas | Sachidanandan Puzhankara | Kalyani |
| 8 | "Vattathil" | Sunil Viswachaithanya | Kaithapram | Sunil |

== Box office ==
The film was a commercial success.
