= Mere Baap Pehle Aap =

- Promotional poster
- Directed by: Priyadarshan
- Written by: Story: Kalavoor Ravikumar; Dialogues: Manisha Korde
- Screenplay by: Priyadarshan
- Based on: Ishtam by Sibi Malayil
- Produced by: Raman Maroo
- Starring: Akshaye Khanna; Genelia D'Souza; Paresh Rawal; Om Puri; Rajpal Yadav
- Cinematography: Piyush Shah
- Edited by: Arun Kumar
- Music by: Songs: Vidyasagar; Guest Composition: Tauseef Akhtar; Background Score: Ranjit Barot
- Production company: Shemaroo Entertainment
- Distributed by: Shemaroo Entertainment
- Release date: 13 June 2008
- Running time: 164 minutes
- Country: India
- Language: Hindi
- Budget: ₹20 crore
- Box office: ₹36 crore

Mere Baap Pehle Aap (translation: My father, You first) is a 2008 Indian Hindi-language comedy-drama film directed by Priyadarshan. The film stars Akshaye Khanna, Genelia D'Souza, Paresh Rawal, Om Puri, Manoj Joshi, Archana Puran Singh, Shobana, and Rajpal Yadav. The film is a remake of the 2001 Malayalam film Ishtam, directed by Sibi Malayil.

== Plot ==
Janaradhan Wishvanbhar Rane is a widower who has spent his life bringing up his two kids, Chirag and Gaurav. Janaradhan has done everything to bring them up in the best possible manner ever since they were toddlers.

Now the duo has grown up, and Gaurav has taken up the responsibility for his father,he is a successful businessman who runs a mall. They manage the household chores and their business to the best of their abilities. He treats his father as his son. Gaurav is on his guard with the vigilance of a disciplined parent. He shouts, threatens, fights, and even locks up his father occasionally so that Rane's best friend, Madhav Mathur, who is a divorcee and desperate to marry, does not spoil him. Madhav and Janaradhan, who are always in search of a bride for Madhav forever, land up in trouble, and Gaurav always has to bail them out and face embarrassment.

Gaurav, busy managing his business, starts getting prank calls from a girl who turns out to be his old college classmate he once bullied and ragged even chopped her hair, Shikha Kapoor. Shikha is currently staying with her guardian Anuradha who turns out to be Janardhan's first love. Gaurav and Shikha notice changes in the behaviour of Janaradhan and Anuradha when they come face-to-face after many years. They learn about their past relationship. Now Gaurav wants his father to marry his lost love. Gaurav and Shikha embark upon a rib-tickling journey to arrange his father's and her guardian's love marriage and, in the process, find soul mates in each other. However, the path is not so smooth; with obstacles, Madhav's desperate desire for a bride comes in handy by getting SP Bhavani.

However, Shikha's father Nirmal, seemingly not pleased with the fact that his daughter will be marrying into a family where her would-be father-in-law is arranging his own honeymoon's, threatens to terminate Gaurav and Shikha's relationship. In addition, Chirag's wife Rupali (Preity Pundir), as well as her family, show anger at such a relationship. Despite all these, after a chain of events, Gaurav gets Rane married to Anuradha, against the wishes of many. However, at the end, Nirmal reveals that in fact, if Gaurav had decided not to conduct his father's remarriage and courted Shikha instead, he would actually have been very disappointed. The film ends with Shikha's father giving Shikha's hand to Gaurav.

== Cast ==
- Akshaye Khanna as Gaurav J. Rane
- Genelia D'Souza as Shikha N. Kapoor a.k.a. Rose
- Paresh Rawal as Janaradhan Vishambhar Rane
- Om Puri as Madhav Mathur
- Archana Puran Singh as SP Bhavani Bhaagmaar Mathur IPS
- Shobana as Anuradha "Anu" Joshi
- Rajpal Yadav as Mannu
- Manoj Joshi as Chirag J. Rane, Gaurav's brother
- Naseeruddin Shah as Nirmal Kapoor, Shikha's father
- Arjun Hansda as Gourav Kumar
- Preity Pundir as Rupali Rane, Gaurav's sister-in-law
- Arzoo Govitrikar as Anjana "Anju" Rao
- Sunil Barve
- Mumaith Khan as item number "Shamma Shamma"

== Production ==
The film features the song "Jaana Hai Tujhko," which was shot in Kerala. Other locations include Mehboob Studios in Bandra, Film City in Goregaon, as well as Goa, Chennai, and Mumbai.

== Music ==
The original score of the film was composed and produced by Ranjit Barot. The soundtrack features songs composed by Vidyasagar. Guest composer Tauseef Akhtar composed one song, "Ishq Subhan Allah" and its remix. Sameer wrote the lyrics for all the songs.

Mere Baap Pehle Aap

Soundtrack album by Vidyasagar
- Released: 2 June 2008
- Recorded: Varsha Vallaki Studios
- Genre: Feature film Soundtrack
- Length: 26:08
- Language: Hindi
- Label: T-Series
- Producer: Vidyasagar

Vidyasagar chronology
Kuruvi (2008)	Mere Baap Pehle Aap (2008)	Kaamannana Makkalu (2008)

Song title	Singers	Composer
"Mere Baap Pehle Aap"	Sangeet Haldipur	Vidyasagar
"Ishq Subhan Allah"	Alisha Chinai, Neeraj Shridhar, Rap by Bob	Tauseef Akhtar
"Shamma Shamma"	Sunidhi Chauhan	Vidyasagar
"Maine Hawa Ke Paron Pe"	Udit Narayan, Shreya Ghoshal	Vidyasagar
"Jaana Hai Tujhko"	Shaan, Alka Yagnik	Vidyasagar
"Ishq Subhan Allah" (Remix)	Alisha Chinai, Neeraj Shridhar, Rap by Bob	Tauseef Akhtar

== Reception ==
=== Box office ===
After a decent opening the film performed moderately well at the box office eventually grossing ₹22,70,50,000 in India. According to Box Office India it was declared "Average". The film opened with 2.60 crore on the first day. And went on to collect around 16.38 crore in week 1.

=== Critical response ===
Anupama Chopra writing for NDTV gave a negative review, writing, ″The story had potential for comedy and heart-warming drama. But Priyadarshan and his cast rework it into a crude, loud, singularly unfunny film. The lead actors—Paresh Rawal and Akshaye Khanna—seem to be on auto-pilot and even the divine, National award winning actress Shobhana is reduced to a prop. Mere Baap is cinema as Chinese torture. Steer clear″ Sukanya Verma of Rediff.com gave the film 2.5 stars out of 5, writing, ″It starts off like a B-grade version of Basu Chatterjee's Shaukeen, changes into a crazy game of Chinese Whispers, develops into a feel-good tale of a father-son and his fun-loving girlfriend, detours to do some heavy-duty Kerala tourism only to drastically meander into an old-fashioned social melodrama followed by a proverbial 'kahani mein twist'.″ Taran Adarsh of Bollywood Hungama gave the film 2.5 stars out of 5, writing, ″On the whole, MERE BAAP PEHLE AAP is enjoyable in parts -- an entertaining first hour, a not-too-entertaining second hour. At the box-office, it's at best an average fare. However, the prospects should improve if the makers trim the film from 2.40 hours to 2.10 hours.″
