= Manasu Rendum Pudhusu =

- Theatrical release poster
- Directed by: P. Amirtham
- Screenplay by: P. Kalaimani
- Story by: A. K. Lohithadas
- Produced by: A. Gunanithi
- Starring: Jayaram; Khushbu
- Cinematography: Ravindar
- Edited by: P. Venkateswara Rao
- Music by: Deva
- Production company: Poomalai Productions
- Release date: 24 June 1994
- Running time: 125 minutes
- Country: India
- Language: Tamil

Manasu Rendum Pudhusu (transl. Two new hearts) is a 1994 Indian Tamil-language film, directed by P. Amirtham. The film stars Jayaram and Khushbu. A remake of the 1990 Malayalam film Sasneham, it was released on 24 June 1994.

== Plot ==
Thomas and Lakshmi, both teachers, are a newly and happily married couple. They got married without their families' consent. Lakshmi finally gets pregnant and the news reaches their respective families. What transpires next forms the rest of the story.

== Cast ==
- Jayaram as Thomas
- Khushbu as Lakshmi
- V. K. Ramasamy as Paramesh
- R. Sundarrajan as Anthony
- Poornam Viswanathan as Narayanan Iyer
- Vinu Chakravarthy as Peter Raj
- Vennira Aadai Moorthy as M. K. Varadaraja Bhagavathar
- Mannangatti as Somu
- Sukumari as Meenakshi
- Vadivukkarasi
- Shanmugasundari
- Kavitha
- S. N. Parvathy
- Radhabhai
- Anuja as Narayani
- Smitha Sajith

== Soundtrack ==
The soundtrack was composed by Deva, with lyrics written by Vaali.

Song	Singer(s)	Duration
"Aala Marathil"	S. P. Balasubrahmanyam	5:07
"Cholike Peeche"	S. Janaki, Mano	4:33
"En Uyir"	Vinod	4:47
"Kadhal Vaanil"	Krishnaraj	4:42
"Mylapore Mami"	Mano, Swarnalatha	4:50

== Reception ==
Malini Mannath of The Indian Express said, "Thanks to [Jayaram] and Khushbu who have not overacted, the scenes are tolerable. The film drags itself towards the end". P. S. S. of Kalki wrote the issue is not new, the story is also not new, the new is present only in the title, and with such a flimsy plot, it is needlessly dragged and the end of the day we feel bored.
