= Karunyam =

- Poster
- Directed by: A. K. Lohithadas
- Written by: A. K. Lohithadas
- Produced by: Azeez, Ousepachan Vaalakuzhy
- Starring: Jayaram; Murali; Divya Unni; Nedumudi Venu
- Cinematography: Ramachandra Babu
- Music by: Kaithapuram Damodaran Namboothiri
- Distributed by: Kavyachandrika Release
- Release date: 18 July 1997
- Country: India
- Language: Malayalam

Karunyam is a 1997 Indian Malayalam-language family drama film written and directed by A. K. Lohithadas, starring Jayaram, Murali and Divya Unni in the leading roles. The film discusses the mishaps faced by an unemployed man in his family. It is considered one of the best scripts written by Lohithadas. The major portions of the film was shot in Lakkidi, Palakkad. The performances from the lead cast were appreciated, especially that of Murali, who plays the complex character of a loving but stressed father, who sacrifices everything for his family. It is considered to be one of the finest performances from Murali.

== Cast ==
- Jayaram as V. G. Satheesh Kumar / Satheeshan
- Murali as Gopinathan Nair
- Divya Unni as Indu
- Janardhanan as K. K. Nair
- Nedumudi Venu as Sukumaran
- Rehana Navas as Anu
- Kalabhavan Mani as Rajan
- Chandni Shaju as Jayasree
- Sreenivasan as Gopalakrishnan
- Kamala Devi as Satheeshan's Mother
- Salu Kuttanadu as Narayanan

== Soundtrack ==
Music and Lyrics: Kaithapram Damodaran Namboothiri

- "Daivame Ninte" - K. J. Yesudas, Master Devadarshan
- "Daivame Ninte" - Master Devadarshan
- "Marakkumo Neeyente" (M) - K. J. Yesudas
- "Marakkumo Neeyente" (F) - K. S. Chitra
- "Poomukham Vidarnnal" - K. J. Yesudas
- "Valampiri Shankil" - K. J. Yesudas
- "Maranjupoyathenthe" - K. J. Yesudas
