= Joker (2000 film) =

- VCD cover
- Directed by: A. K. Lohithadas
- Written by: A. K. Lohithadas
- Produced by: Salim Sathar
- Starring: Dileep; Manya; Nishanth Sagar
- Cinematography: Venugopal
- Edited by: A. Sreekar Prasad
- Music by: Mohan Sithara (songs); S. P. Venkatesh (score)
- Production company: Aachis Films
- Distributed by: Aachis; Aadithya Release
- Release date: 29 October 2000
- Running time: 148 minutes
- Country: India
- Language: Malayalam

Joker is a 2000 Indian Malayalam-language satirical drama film written and directed by A. K. Lohithadas. The film stars Dileep, with Manya, Nishanth Sagar, Bahadoor, T. S. Raju, Mamukkoya, and Bindu Panicker in supporting roles. The film was edited by A. Sreekar Prasad. The songs were composed by Mohan Sithara, while S. P. Venkatesh provided the background score.

The plot revolved around a broke circus company whose owner has promised his daughter's hand to Babu, a clown who supervises the circus. However, things change when new member Sudheer Misra arrives. Joker was the last film appearance of Bahadoor, who died in May 2000. The film was a commercial success at the box office.

== Plot ==
Royal Circus, owned by Govindan, is on the rocks. With the help of his manager, Khader, Govindan just manages to run the company, though not in a satisfactory manner. All the members of the troupe live as a family, sharing intimate bonds of love and camaraderie. Abookka, once a clown, has turned insane. As he still insists on putting on the make-up and entering the ring, he is caged when the show goes on. Babu, the favourite of the troupe, is the clown of Royal Circus. Abooka has trained him to become the perfect clown. And he has learned the perfect art of masking his sorrows behind the clown's ever-laughing mask. He has been there in the troupe ever since his childhood, looking after the other children, especially Govindan's daughter Kamala.

Govindan has always been saying that Babu is to be his heir and is to marry Kamala. And of course, Babu, deep in his heart, has feelings of love for Kamala. The movie takes a turn when Sudheer Misra, the young son of Padmini, a former member of the troupe, makes his entry into the camp. Sudheer's arrival marks the beginning of change. He steers the company out of its crisis and gives it a new form and name as New Royal Circus.

Sudheer falls in love with Kamala instantly, but Kamala disagrees to marry him. Babu loves Kamala a lot but is ready to sacrifice Kamala for the good of the troupe and its members. Vanaja, a performer in the team, was earlier betrayed by Sudheer. She decides not to let Sudheer ruin the lives of Kamala and Babu. Sudheer wants to have revenge on Babu since Kamala loves him. But towards the end, Sudheer decides to forget Kamala and have Vanaja back in his life. But Vanaja, unaware of this, creates an accident during the Trapeze, killing Sudheer. Babu and Kamala are united in the end.

== Cast ==
- Dileep as Babu
- Manya as Kamala
- Nishanth Sagar as Sudhir Mishra/Sudhakaran, the Main antagonist
- T. S. Raju as Govindan, Circus company owner
- Mamukkoya as Khader, Circus company manager
- Bahadoor as Abookka
- Mala Aravindan as Kumarettan
- Bindu Panicker as Susheela
- Zeenath as Jameela
- Anitha Nair as Vanaja
- Reena as Padmini
- Guinness Pakru as a joker at circus
- Nadirsha
- N. L. Balakrishnan as Usthadu Ranjan Pappa
- Dhanya Menon
- Sreehari as Shekarettan

== Soundtrack ==
Joker

Soundtrack album by Mohan Sithara
- Released: 29 September 2000
- Recorded: 2000
- Genre: World Music
- Label: Satyam Audios
- Producer: Mohan Sithara

Mohan Sithara chronology
Mazhavillu (1999)	Joker (2000)	Dada Sahib (2000)

The background score was done by S. P. Venkatesh.

All lyrics are written by Yusufali Kechery except where noted; all music is composed by Mohan Sithara.

No.	Title	Lyrics	Artist(s)	Length
1.	"Akasha Deepame"		P. Jayachandran
2.	"Azhake Nee Paadum"	A. K. Lohithadas	K. J. Yesudas
3.	"Chemmanam Poothe"	A. K. Lohithadas	K. J. Yesudas
4.	"Dhwani Tharanga"		K. J. Yesudas, K. S. Chithra
5.	"Enthu Bhangi Ninne Kaanan"		K. J. Yesudas
6.	"Kaneer Mazhayethu"		K. J. Yesudas
7.	"Pon Kasavu"		K. S. Chithra
8.	"Pon Kasavu"		P. Jayachandran, K. S. Chithra

== Reception ==
A critic from Kerala Talkies wrote that "A highly watchable film if you like a simple, straight forward story with some good music, comedy and emotions mixed and matched in good proportion". A critic from Indiainfo.com praised the work of the cast and crew.

== Awards ==
2001 Filmfare Awards South

- Best Music Director - Malayalam - Mohan Sithara
