= Alice in Wonderland (2005 film) =

2005 film by Sibi Malayil

- Directed by: Sibi Malayil
- Produced by: Cinema Company
- Starring: Jayaram; Vineeth; Sandhya; Laya
- Cinematography: Venu
- Edited by: L. Bhoominathan
- Music by: Vidyasagar
- Release date: 8 April 2005
- Country: India
- Language: Malayalam

Alice in Wonderland is a 2005 Indian Malayalam-language fantasy comedy drama film directed by Sibi Malayil. It stars Jayaram and Sandhya as brother and sister duo. The music is scored by Vidyasagar. Despite the name, the plot bears no reference or resemblance to the Lewis Carroll book Alice's Adventures in Wonderland.

== Plot ==
Alby's sister Alice is mentally challenged. He adores her and dotes on her. Into their life comes Victor, a young magician. His loving nature attracts Alice. Alby senses this intrusion and the relationship becomes strained between the brother and sister. Sophia, a research student from Singapore, wants to prepare a thesis on orphanages. She and Alby become friends. Soon Alby becomes attracted to her and this creates tension in her mind. They must come to terms with each other's need for companionship in their life.

== Cast ==
- Jayaram as Alby
- Vineeth as Victor Joseph (Sundar)
- Sandhya as Alice, Alby's sister
- Laya as Sophie Oommen
- Jyothirmayi as Dr. Sunitha
- Jagathy Sreekumar as Fr. Stephen
- Sukumari as Grandma
- Ayyappa Baiju as Lonappan
- Janardhanan as Mani Kuruvila, ex-military
- Kulappully Leela as Martha, housekeeper
- Baby Rehana as Chakky

== Soundtrack ==
Song title	Singers
"May Maasam"	Karthik, Cicilly
"Pottu Thottu"	K. J. Yesudas
"Kannilumma"	Sujatha Mohan, Vidhu Prathap
"Kukku Kukku"	Prathapa Chandran
"Tap Dance"	Instrumental
