= Thaniyavarthanam =

- Poster designed by Gayathri Ashokan
- Directed by: Sibi Malayil
- Written by: A. K. Lohithadas
- Produced by: Nandakumar
- Starring: Mammootty; Thilakan; Mukesh; Saritha; Philomina; Kaviyoor Ponnamma
- Cinematography: Saloo George
- Edited by: L. Bhoominathan
- Music by: Score: Johnson; Song: M G Radhakrishnan
- Production company: Nandana Films
- Distributed by: Tharangini Films
- Release date: 14 August 1987; (Kerala)
- Running time: 120 minutes
- Country: India
- Language: Malayalam

Thaniyavarthanam (English: The Repeating Rhythm) is a 1987 Malayalam language psychological drama film written by A. K. Lohithadas and directed by Sibi Malayil. It stars Mammootty as school teacher Balagopalan, Thilakan as the uncle of the matrilineal family, Mukesh as Gopinathan, and Kaviyoor Ponnamma as Balagopalan's mother. The film became a cult classic. Thilakan won Kerala State Film Award for Second Best Actor.

Upon release, it received critical acclaim. The film discusses a variety of topics, such as superstition and orthodoxy in rural Kerala, attitudes towards mental illness, the difference in attitude between people of different generations, and the decline of once-proud Nair "joint families". It was actor Thilakan who recommended Mammootty for the lead role (Balagopalan). The screenplay by Lohithadas stands out even today because of its scientific accuracy and realistic depiction.

== Plot ==
The story is set in a rural village in Kerala. Balagopalan Master or Balan Master, a school drawing teacher in Government service, has a serene life, with two children, a wife, a mother, a younger brother - Gopi, and a younger sister. Gopi is an educated young man, who is against all superstitions. Balagopalan is part of a declining, yet proud, Nair joint family in the village. The elder members of the family are rooted in superstition and orthodoxy. It is a traditional matrilineal society in which the karnavar, the elder one, in the family takes decisions and holds power. Here, instead of the father, the uncle enjoys more power. All decisions in the family are taken by him.

Balan has another uncle, Sreedharan, who is locked up and chained in a dark room in the house as he is considered to be mentally challenged. The belief among the family is that one male from each generation will go mad as a person from their previous generation had sinned by throwing the idol of the family goddess in a well. He was cursed by the goddess and became a lunatic. This curse is supposed to pass down through generations. Balan's uncle finally dies and the talk of the village is - "Who would be next - Balan or Gopi ?"

One night changes it all when Balan has a terrible nightmare. The whole house is woken up in the middle of the night. The elder members of the family suspect that Balan is turning mad. The news somehow gets out. Villagers start suspecting Balan of following the footsteps of his ancestors into madness as Sreedharan too had fallen mentally ill with a nightmare.

Now, the village evaluates and judges each and every move he makes; he is soon deemed mentally ill. His actions are misinterpreted. His students consider him to be a lunatic. He applies for an extended leave and transfers from service. Even some members of his family suspect that he has gone mad. The situation affects Balan and makes him confused. Gopi, progressive and educated, makes Balan consult with a medically qualified physician. The physician declares him sane. But the village doesn't agree.

In the meantime, Balan's wife is forced to leave the house with their children. The family fixes the marriage of his younger sister while hiding the fact she has a "challenged" elder brother. Eventually, Balan is admitted to an asylum and undergoes treatment. He is released after a few days - both mentally and physically broken - and confined to the darkroom his uncle once lived in. Society hounds him and beats him into mental subjugation.

Balan's mother eventually poisons him and kills him on the day of the ritual for forgiveness from the goddess - to free him from the world. The same hand which once fed him his first morsel of rice becomes the one that feeds him his last meal. She too kills herself, as she couldn't forgive herself for this heinous act.

== Cast ==
- Mammootty as Balagopalan or Balan Master, a drawing teacher
- Saritha as Indu, Balan's wife
- Asha Jayaram as Sumitra
- Mukesh as Gopinathan - younger brother of Balagopalan - progressive in mindset
- Thilakan as Balan's Uncle
- Kaviyoor Ponnamma as Balan's Mother
- Philomina as Balan's Grandmother
- Innocent as Headmaster of the school
- Babu Namboothiri as Sreedharan - Balan's 'mad' uncle
- Sonia as Anitha M. Balagopalan (Manikutty)
- Valsala Menon as Balan's Aunt
- Prathapachandran as Balan's Father-in-Law
- Oduvil Unnikrishnan as Raman Karthavu
- Bobby Kottarakkara as Narayanan
- Kothuku Nanappan as Astrologer
- Parvathy as Sreedharan's lover

== Themes ==
The movie deals with certain psychological themes and the toxic nature of society in the olden days. Balagopalan had lived a stress-free life, but his life was ruined due to superstitions and the overall lack of knowledge of mental health during those times. The scrutiny of society coupled with the traditional mindset of the people back then led to Balagopalan's downfall. In the nightmare, Balagopalan hears the rattle of the chain in his dream which symbolizes the fact he's chained to traditions and he is a hostage to these traditions. The same chains which had chained his uncle eventually led to his demise.

== Soundtrack ==
The music was composed by M. G. Radhakrishnan.

No.	Song	Singers	Lyrics	Length (m:ss)
1	Sreejayadeva	K. J. Yesudas		
2	Sreejayadeva	M. G. Sreekumar		

== Awards ==
- Filmfare Award for Best Film - Malayalam won by V. Nandakumar (1987)

== Legacy ==
Thaniyavathanam is considered one of the best Indian films on mental health. Upon release, it was met with excellent reviews from critics. Director Ram cited Thaniyavarthanam as his reason for casting Mammootty as the lead in Peranbu (2019). The film was a major commercial success which was uncommon for films dealing with sensitive topics, like mental illness. The film is still highly regarded today and has achieved cult status. Kamal Haasan has stated that one of his favorite 70 Indian movies is Thaniyavarthanam. Director Bala, in an interview mentioned that, inspired by the climax of the film, he wrote the story of Nandhaa (2001).

== See also ==
- Mental illness in film
- List of films featuring mental illness
