= Kasthooriman =

- CD Cover
- Directed by: A. K. Lohithadas
- Written by: A. K. Lohithadas
- Starring: Kunchako Boban; Meera Jasmine; Kalasala Babu; Shammi Thilakan
- Cinematography: Venu
- Edited by: Raja Mohammad
- Music by: Ouseppachan
- Production company: Mudra Arts International
- Distributed by: Mudra Arts Release
- Release date: 4 April 2003
- Country: India
- Language: Malayalam

Kasthooriman (transl. Musk deer) is a 2003 Indian Malayalam-language romantic drama film written and directed by A. K. Lohithadas. Lohithadas remade the film in Tamil under the same title, with Meera and Shammi reprising their respective roles.

== Plot ==
Sajan Joseph Alukka is a soft-spoken and studious young man, while his junior Priyamvada is smart and outgoing. Her close friend is in love with Sajan, but he avoids her by saying that his only ambition in life is to study hard and become an IAS officer.

However, Priya follows him and digs out the truth that though he hails from a rich family, his father has gone bankrupt and has no money even to pay the exam fee. On hearing this, her friend ditches him. Slowly, Priya starts having a soft corner for him. She even pays his fees while Sajan tries to avoid her and treats her financial support as an insult.

Sajan and Priya fall in love, and she supports him during his preparation for the IAS exam. She is over the moon when Sajan gets his IAS. However, things take a turn when Priya murders her abusive brother-in-law in self-defense and is sent to prison. Sajan waits for her return, and the two are reunited after Priya's prison term is completed.

== Cast ==
- Kunchacko Boban as Sajan Joseph Alukka IAS, Assistant Collector
- Meera Jasmine as Priyamvada
- Shammi Thilakan as Rajendran
- Kalasala Babu as Lonappan
- Lishoy as Joseph Alukka, Sajan's father
- Cochin Haneefa as Younis, House Owner
- Sandra Amy as Sheela Paul
- Bindu Murali as Alice
- Ambika Mohan as Vanaja, Priyamvada's and Raji's mother
- Sona Nair as Raji, Priyamvada's sister
- Kulappulli Leela as Raji's mother-in-law
- Suma Jayaram as House owner
- Devi Chandana as Nancy, Sajan's sister
- Sadiq as Jacob, Sajan's brother-in-law
- Rema Devi as College lecturer
- Nandakishore
- Nivedya as Police officer

== Soundtrack ==
The film's soundtrack contains eight songs, all composed by Ouseppachan, with lyrics by Kaithapram Damodaran Namboothiri.

| # | Title | Singer(s) |
|---|---|---|
| 1 | "Azhake" | P. Jayachandran, Sujatha Mohan |
| 2 | "Karkuzhali" | Sujatha Mohan |
| 3 | "One Plus One" | M. G. Sreekumar, Jyotsna |
| 4 | "Raakkuyil [D]" | K. J. Yesudas, K. S. Chitra, Chorus |
| 5 | "Raakkuyil" | K. J. Yesudas, K. S. Chitra |
| 6 | "Maarivil Thooval" | Santhosh Kesav |

== Reception ==
A critic from Nowrunning wrote that "The film is worth a watch in the theatres, thanks to an engaging directorial style of Lohithadas who believes in simple and straightforward way of story telling".

== Awards ==
Kerala State Film Awards 2003

- Best Actress - Meera Jasmine

Filmfare Awards South

- Filmfare Award for Best Actress - Malayalam - Meera Jasmine

Kerala Film Critics Association Awards

- Best Female Playback Singer - Sujatha Mohan
