= Sagaram Sakshi =

- Directed by: Sibi Malayil
- Written by: A. K. Lohithadas
- Produced by: Ousepachan Vaalakuzhy
- Starring: Mammootty; Sukanya; Thilakan
- Cinematography: Venu
- Edited by: L. Bhoominathan
- Music by: Songs: Sharreth; Background Score: Ouseppachan
- Release date: 21 October 1994
- Country: India
- Language: Malayalam

Sagaram Sakshi (transl. Ocean as witness) is a 1994 Malayalam film directed by Sibi Malayil. It stars Mammootty in the lead role, with Sukanya and Thilakan in supporting roles. A. K. Lohithadas wrote the screenplay for this film. This was the last film of Sibi Malayil-Lohithadas combination.

== Cast ==
- Mammootty as Balachandran / Balan/Swami Athmachaithanya
- Sukanya as Nirmala / Nimmy, Balachandran's wife
- Thilakan as Menon, Nimmy's Father
- Oduvil Unnikrishnan as Narayanan/Narayanettan, Balachandran's driver and old mentor
- Zeenath as Subadhra, Nimmy's eldest sister, Krishnakumar's wife
- Kundara Johnny as K. K. Nair
- Cochin Haneefa as Sudhakaran, Balachandran's manager
- Sreejaya Nair as Indu, Balachandran's and Nimmy's daughter
- Valsala Menon as Nimmy's Mother
- Bindu Panicker as Malathi, Nimmy's elder sister, Radhakrishnan's wife.
- Ravi Vallathol as Adv. Radhakrishnan Nair, Balachandran's co-brother
- N. F. Varghese as DYSP Krishnakumar, Balachandran's other co-brother
- Aranmula Ponnamma
- Vijayakumar
- Santhakumari
- Dileep as Krishakumar's son (uncredited)

== Soundtrack ==
Sharreth has composed the original score for the movie, with lyrics written by Kaithapram Damodaran Namboothiri.

Song title	Singers
"Karayaathe Kannurangu"	K. S. Chitra
"Karayaathe Kannurangu"	K. J. Yesudas
"Neelaakaasham"	K. J. Yesudas, K. S. Chitra
"Shyaamasandhye Sooryanevide"	K. J. Yesudas, Chorus
"Swargaminnente"	K. J. Yesudas
