= Kaattile Thadi Thevarude Ana =

Kaatttile Thadi Thevarude Ana
- Directed by: K. K. Haridas
- Written by: T. Damodaran
- Produced by: V. B. K. Menon
- Starring: Siddique; Jagathy Sreekumar
- Cinematography: Venugopal Madathil
- Edited by: K. Sankunni
- Music by: Johnson
- Release date: 1995
- Country: India
- Language: Malayalam

Kaatttile Thadi Thevarude Ana is a 1995 Indian Malayalam-language film, directed by K. K. Haridas, starring Siddique and Jagathy Sreekumar in the lead roles. The basic premise is loosely based on the 1993 American political comedy film Dave.

== Plot ==
Venugopal is a sincere home minister who has a sister, Sindhu. Sindhu is in love with Devan. An incident happens that questions the minister integrity. In a newspaper, a legislator announces that ganja dealers openly operate in a forest if both of them go together, he will show all the dealers to Venugopal. The minister accepts the challenge and goes with the MLA. In the forest, the MLA and minister's personal assistant, Alex, set a trap, the minister gets shot and falls down in the forest and now a lookalike, who was a local nuisance (Manikantan), is now set as home minister. Manikantan now has to obey the PA and act according to his wishes. Meanwhile, the original home minister is now recovering from the injuries he sustained in the forest and tells the tribal folk that he is the home minister. Finally, the friends of the fake minister also find Venugopal. They admit him to a nearby mental asylum. The fake minister overhears a terrorist speak with the PA to kill Manikantan later after ISRO data gets leaked, and they get the money from ea foreign power. Devan, who was in prison (framed by Alex), enters the scene. Devan goes along with the fake home minister to the asylum and frees the original minister. At the end, the villains arrive and fight. Eventually, the police arrive and Venugopal orders the police to arrest the PA and all the villains.

== Cast ==
- Siddique as Devan
- Jagathy Sreekumar as Home Minister Venugopal & Manikantan (double role)
- Maathu as Sindhu
- Ilavarasi as Ammini
- M. G. Soman as Chief Minister Rajashekaran
- Kalpana as Kanakam
- Appa Haja as Nandakumar
- Adoor Bhavani as Manikantan's grandmother
- Janardhanan as Alex
- Kuthiravattom Pappu as Veerappan
- Cochin Haneefa as Nagayya
- Silk Smitha as Herself
- V. K. Sreeraman as Vaidyar
- T. P. Madhavan as Madhavan
- Valsala Menon as Venugopal's and Devan's mother
- K. R. Vatsala as Servent
- Poojappura Ravi as Policeman
- Ramu as Chotta Raghu
