= Malayogom =

1990 Indian comedy-drama film

Maalayogam
- Directed by: Sibi Malayil
- Written by: A. K. Lohithadas
- Produced by: N. Krishnakumar (Kireedam Unni)
- Starring: Jayaram; Mukesh; Parvathy; Chithra; Murali
- Cinematography: S. Kumar
- Edited by: L. Bhoominathan
- Music by: Mohan Sithara
- Production company: Kripa Films
- Distributed by: Thomson Films
- Release date: 1990
- Country: India
- Language: Malayalam

Malayogom (transl. Wedding fortune), or Maalayogam is a 1990 Indian Malayalam-language family comedy-drama film directed by Sibi Malayil and written by A. K. Lohithadas, starring Jayaram, Mukesh, Parvathy and Chithra. Written by A. K. Lohithadas, the film discuss about the issues of unemployment and the women who get victimised for the societal obsession with the dowry system.

== Plot ==
Rameshan and Jose are best friends coming from similar backgrounds. Both are educated well-groomed lads of more earthy parents. Rameshan's father Paramu Nair is a tea shop owner while Jose's father Varkey is a farmer. Both have sisters waiting to be married off, only being confined by the outrageous demands for dowry. Rameshan is also in love with Rema, daughter of a wealthy landlord Raman Vaidyar, who is hell-bent on marrying off his daughter to a doctor.

While local brokers try to fix up the ladies with suitable men by hook or crook, Rameshan and Jose grow increasingly anxious for jobs. Seeing the success achieved by the local brokers, they decide to get into the marriage broker business after convincing their parents that this would be a winning shot. However, their plan goes bust when the business flops driving them both to desperation again. Meanwhile, Rema gets married off to a doctor Sudakaran as Rameshan fails to find the courage to save her. Rameshan's sister also elopes with the local coconut picker Damodaran after her father reluctantly arranges her marriage with Raman Vaidyar. Though initially enraged, Rameshan reconciles with his sister and Damodaran after realizing that his sister could not have found a better man.

Damodaran advises Rameshan to get rid of his stigmas and join his father's tea shop. Both he and Jose join their father and are able to find better success than with any of their past ventures. Meanwhile, Varkey forms a plan to get Jose married off for a sum of dowry, with which he could marry off his daughter Rosie. They find suitable alliances and the marriage is fixed. However, the happy occasion is clouded by the tragic news of Rema's death. Rema was deeply unhappy with her husband who constantly harassed her and her father for money, despite her father having paid a huge sum of dowry and almost neck up in debt. Rameshan is devastated and ridden by guilt that he could not save her from this terrible fate. Finally the day of the betrothal dawns and both Jose and Rosie take their vows together.

But the happiness is short-lived as Varkey discovers belatedly that the girl's family had not been able to gather the promised dowry. He is furious but even more fearful that this would severely affect Rosie's marriage. On hearing that they would not receive the dowry promptly, Rosie's betrothed and his family immediately break the betrothal. Varkey, mad with anger and grief commands Jose to break off with his betrothed too, which he gallantly refuses. Rameshan pleads desperately with the leaving parties as well as with the church priest and locals to stop and reconsider, as the cancellation of this marriage would devastate Rosie. When no one offers support and hurl more abuses, Rameshan steps forward and asks Jose for Rosie hand in marriage. Despite the difference in faith, Jose and his father are overjoyed at this. At the end Rameshan takes a grateful Rosie's hand in his, while Varkey and Jose look on with joy.

== Cast ==
- Jayaram as Rameshan
- Mukesh as Jose
- Innocent as Rama Kurup
- Murali as Damodaran
- Thilakan as Varkey
- Parvathy Jayaram as Rema
- Oduvil Unnikrishnan as Paramu Nair
- Chithra as Rosey
- Suma Jayaram as Rajalakshmi
- Mamukkoya as K. K. Kunjuttan
- Jagadish as Gangadharan
- Philomina as Mary
- Valsala Menon as Narayani
- Kalpana as Subhadra
- K.B. Ganesh Kumar as Georgekutty
- Maniyanpilla Raju as Dr. Sudhakaran
- Indrans as Kochuraman
- Karamana Janardhanan Nair as Mathachan, Georgekutty's father
- Praseetha Menon as Mercykutty, Jose's sister
- Jose Pellisseri as the man at church
- Kunjandi as Anthony
- Prof. Aliyar as Priest

== Soundtrack ==
Malayogom

Soundtrack album by Mohan Sithara
- Genre: Film soundtrack
- Label: Ranjini Cassettes; Satyam Audios

The soundtrack album was composed by Mohan Sithara for the lyrics penned by Kaithapram.

Track	Song title	Singer(s)
1	Manithaaliyaayi	M. G. Sreekumar, Chorus
2	Poothumpi	Balagopalan Thampi, Chorus
3	Rajani Hrudayam	M. G. Sreekumar
