= Shammi Thilakan =

Indian actor

- Born: Pathanamthitta, Kerala, India
- Occupations: Actor; dubbing artist
- Years active: 1985–present
- Spouse: Usha
- Children: Abhimanyu S Thilakan
- Father: Thilakan

Shammi Thilakan is an Indian actor and dubbing artist who works primarily in Malayalam cinema. He has appeared in over 150 films, mainly in supporting and negative roles, and is also known for his extensive contributions as a voice artist. The son of veteran actor Thilakan, Shammi has established an independent career through his performances in both films and television.He is a recipient of multiple Kerala State Film Awards for Best Dubbing Artist, including for dubbing the voices of Nassar in Ghazal and Prakash Raj in Odiyan.

== Early and personal life ==
Shammi Thilakan was born in Pathanamthitta, Kerala, India. He is the son of actor Thilakan and brother of Shobi Thilakan. He is married to Usha. They have one son, Abhimanyu, who is also an actor. He currently resides in Kollam with his family.

== Filmography ==
Key
†	Denotes films that have not yet been released

=== As an actor ===
Year	Title	Role	Notes
1985	Irakal	Cyril	
1989	Jaathakam	Chendakkaran	
1990	Ottayal Pattalam		
1990	Radha Madhavam	Shashankan	
1992	Thalastaanam	Divakaran	
1993	Dhruvam	Ali	
1993	Chenkol	SI John Mathew	
1993	Ente Sreekuttikku	Martin	
1993	Sakshal Sreeman Chathunni	Vikraman	
1994	Ilayum Mullum		
1994	Kambolam	Thankachan	
1994	Kadal	Anali Thoma	
1994	Puthran	Stephen	
1994	Chukkan		
1994	Dhadha	Anali Thoma	
1994	Bharanakoodam	Circle Inspector Sojan	
1994	Vendor Daniel State Licency	Police Officer Daniel	
1994	Rajadhani	CI Minnal Rajan	
1995	Street	Sudhi	
1995	Keerthanam	Sunny	
1995	Mangalyasootram	Bhadran	
1995	Manikya Chempazhukka	Dharmaraj	
1995	Agrajan	Raju Nair	
1995	Rajakeeyam	Aravind	
1995	Boxer	Sub Inspector Prabhuram	
1995	Sargavasantham	Vishnu	
1995	Achan Kombathu Amma Varampathu	Rajendran	
1996	Kaathil Oru Kinnaram	Lawrence	
1996	Kanjirapally Kariyachan	Joyachan Manimala	
1996	Sulthan Hyderali	Ashraf	
1996	Mimics Super 1000	C.I. Vaal Gopinathan	
1996	KL.7/95 Eranakulam North	Prakashan	
1997	Bhoopathi	Chindan	
1997	Lelam	Police Officer	
1997	Manikyakoodaram	Kiran Varma	
1997	Kilikurissiyile Kudumbamela	Sharathchandran	
1997	Moonnu Kodiyum Monnuru Pavanum	Mathew Chullikkal	
1997	Nagarapuranam	Manikantan	
1998	Panchaloham	Chakrapaani	
1998	Gloria Fernandes from USA	Joyachan Manimala	
1998	Harthal	Backer	
1999	Ezhupunna Tharakan	Police Commissioner	
1999	Pathram	CI Haridas	
1999	Vazhunnor	Chandrasekharan	
1999	Auto Brothers	Nazeer Saith	
2000	The Warrant	SI Hakkim	
2000	India Gate	Sarath	
2000	Mark Antony	Rajan	
2001	Praja	Balaraman	
2002	Phantom	Bhadran	
2003	Ente Veedu Appuvinteyum	Chandran	
2003	Kasthooriman	Rajendran	
2004	Maampazhakkaalam	Chackochan	
2004	Sethurama Iyer CBI	Crime branch CI Mathew	
2004	Runway	S.P Vishwanathan	
2004	Koottu	Joseph	
2005	Isra	Police	
2005	Udayon	SI Itty	
2005	Kasthuri Maan	S. K. Nagarajan	Tamil film
2006	Baba Kalyani	Adv. Dineshan	
2006	Smart City	Raghuram Vaidyan	
2006	The Don	Faizal	
2006	Pathaka	Monippally Dineshan	
2006	Keerthi Chakra	Hari	
2006	Vadakkum Nathan	Vishwanathan	
2006	Lion	District Collector Gopalan	
2007	Alibhai	Vaakathi Vareed	
2007	Nadiya Kollappetta Rathri	Sudarshanan	
2007	July 4	Ripper Murugan	
2007	Sooryakireedam	Vishnu Narayanan	
2007	Inspector Garud	Commissioner Gopinath	
2008	Twenty:20	Ganeshan	
2008	Aayudham	Prof Rasool Ahmed	
2008	Cycle		
2008	Roudram	CI Joy	
2008	Sultan		
2009	Aayirathil Oruvan	Vishwambaran	
2009	Puthiya Mugham	Giri	
2010	Njan Sanchari		
2010	9 KK Road	Noushad	
2010	Kaaryasthan	Gopalan	
2010	24 Hrs	Inspector Ajay	
2010	Again Kasargod Khader Bhai	DYSP Siju Jose	
2011	Aazhakadal	Paulakandathil Paulson (Paulachan)	
2011	Koratty Pattanam Railway Gate	CI	
2011	Indian Rupee	Kasaba SI	
2011	Makeup Man	Police inspector	
2011	Rathinirvedam	Krishnan Nair	
2011	Seniors	CI Thomas George	
2011	The Metro	City Police Commissioner Satheesh Kumar	
2012	Simhasanam	V.S. Nair	
2012	Run Baby Run	DYSP Benny Tharakan	
2012	Masters	Roy	
2012	MLA Mani Patham Classum Gusthiyum	Amir Hussain	
2012	Scene Onnu Nammude Veedu	Unknown	
2013	Neram	SI Ukken Tintu	
2013	Housefull	Kiliyaachan	
2013	Nee Ko Njaa Cha	Ravi Kumar	
2013	Lokpal	Vidyadharan	
2013	Sringara Velan	SI Ukken Tintu	
2013	Pullipulikalum Aattinkuttiyum	Kavalykal Kuriyachan	
2013	Nadodimannan	CI Karadi Johny	
2013	Weeping Boy	Rahim	
2014	Jilla	Police Inspector (cameo)	Tamil film
2014	Vegam	Mukundan	
2014	Mannar Mathai Speaking 2	Driver Koshi	
2014	Tamaar Padaar	Kumaran	
2014	Avatharam	CI Jeevan	
2014	Bhaiyya Bhaiyya	Vettuparambil Monayi	
2014	Manja	Abhayaraj	
2015	1000 – Oru Note Paranja Katha	Police inspector	
2016	Darvinte Parinammam	Ayyappan	
2016	Appuram Bengal Ippuram Thiruvithamkoor	Pastor.Thankachen	
2016	Pa Va	Fr. Ittiparamban	
2016	Zoom	Joseph Tharakan	
2017	Pokkiri Simon	Arjunan	
2017	Matchbox	Narendran, Ambus father	
2017	Chunkzz	Jose / Oola Jose	
2017	Bobby	Joy	
2017	Lakshyam	Ravi	
2017	Tharangam	Tharian	
2018	Kaly	Balan Moothedan	
2018	Theevandi	MLA Balachandran	
2019	Sakalakalashala	Kallarakkal Achan	
2019	Chithiram Pesuthadi 2	Gangster	Tamil film
2019	Soothrakkaran	Rajan	
2019	Vaarikkuzhiyile Kolapathakam	Kunjoyi	
2019	Poovalliyum Kunjadum	Mangalath Sivan	
2019	March Randam Vyazham	Fr. Ashby	
2019	Kalikoottukar	DYSP Gafoor Ahammad	
2020	2 States	Nervous goon	
2021	Joji	Dr. Felix	
2021	Oru Thathvika Avalokanam	Satyan	
2022	Jana Gana Mana	Adv. Raghuram Iyer	
2022	Third World Boys		
2022	Paappan	Iruttan Chacko	
2022	Palthu Janwar	Dr.Sunil Isaac	
2022	Padavettu	Kuyyali	
2022	Gold	Unnikrishnan	
2023	Neymar	Sahadevan	
2023	King of Kotha	Kotha Ravi	
2024	Anweshippin Kandethum	Sadanandan Cheruvally	
2024	Little Hearts	Joy	
2024	Oru Kattil Oru Muri		
2025	Identity	Dr. Sudharshan	
2025	Bazooka		
2025	Vilayath Buddha	Bhaskaran Master	

=== As a dubbing artist ===
Year	Film	Character	Dubbed for
2018	Odiyan	Ravunni	Prakash Raj
2015	Ivan Maryadaraman	Kizhakkekottayil Narasimhan	Nagineedu
2013	Black Butterfly	CI Nandakumar Nadar	Muthuraman
2012	No. 66 Madhura Bus	Sanjayan	Makarand Deshpande
2010	Pramani	Varkkichan Joseph	Prabhu
2010	Apoorvaragam	Philipose Melipra	Sankar Guru Raja
2010	Marykkundoru Kunjaadu	Jose's friend	Vimal Raj
2006	Lakshmi (Malayalam Version)	Lakshmi Narayanan	Venkatesh
2003	Magic Magic 3D (also dialogue writer)	Krishna	Tirlok Malik
2001	Sathyameva Jayathe	Musharuf Ibrahim	Hemanth Ravanan
2001	Ravanaprabhu	Mundakkal Shekharan	Napoleon
2000	The Warrant	Ravi Ramakrishna	Napoleon
1997	Janathipathyam	C.I Xavier Idikula	Sunil
1997	Moonu Kodiyum Munnooru Pavanum	Lazer	Spadikam George
1997	Kalyana Unnikal		P.C George
1997	Itha Oru Snehagatha	Havildar Mahadevan	Veera Pandiyan
1996	Kulam	Thampi	Nassar
1996	Indraprastham	Mohan George	Prakash Raj
1995	Arabia	Kalabhai	Mohan Natarajan
1995	Spadikam	S.I Kuttikadan	Spadikam George
1995	Vrudhanmare Sookshikkuka	Balachandran	Sunil
1993	Devasuram	Mundakkal Shekaran	Napoleon
1993	Ghazal	Valyamalikal Haaji	Nassar
1993	Addeham Enna Iddeham	Perera	Raghuvaran
1993	O' Faby	Faby & S.I Sekher	Cartoon & Nassar
1993	Sopanam	Rajaraja Varma Thamburan	J. V. Somayajulu
1993	Samooham	Krishnamoorthy	John Amrutharaj
1993	Dhruvam	Hyder Marakkar	Tiger Prabhakar
1993	Aacharyan	Abdulla Koya	Cleetus Mendiz
1993	Aacharyan	Unni	Rajeev Nanayakar
1992	Kauravar	Haridas	Vishnuvardhan
1992	Soorya Manasam	Sivan	Raghuvaran
1992	Oottyppattanam	Dharmaraj	Mahesh Anand
1991	Kuttapathram	Vicky	Babu Antony
1991	Aanaval Mothiram	Guru	Mohan Raj
1990	Oliyampukal	Devayyan	Charanraj
1990	Thazhvaram	Raju	Salim Ghouse
1990	Vyooham	Tony Louis	Raghuvaran
1990	Kadathanadan Ambadi	Chanthu Gurukkal	Prem Nazir

== Television ==
Show	Channel
Kayamkulam Kochunniyude Makan	Surya TV
Vikramadithanin Simhasanam	Asianet
Ente Manasaputhri	Asianet
Vajram	Asianet
Kadamattathu Kathanar	Asianet
Crime & Punishment	Asianet
Saayvinte Makkal	Mazhavil Manorama
Mahathma Gandhi Colony	Surya TV

== Awards ==
- 2018 - Kerala State Film Awards - Best Dubbing Artist: Odiyan
- 2013 - Vanitha Film Awards - Best Comedian: Neram, Sringaravelan
- 1993 - Kerala State Film Awards - Best Dubbing Artist: Gazal
