= Achuvettante Veedu =

1987 Indian film

- Directed by: Balachandra Menon
- Written by: Balachandra Menon
- Produced by: A. V. Govindankutty
- Starring: Nedumudi Venu; Balachandra Menon; Rohini Hattangadi; Rohini
- Edited by: Balachandra Menon
- Music by: Vidyadharan (songs); Mohan Sithara (score)
- Distributed by: Safe Release
- Release date: 4 September 1987
- Country: India
- Language: Malayalam

Achuvettante Veedu (transl. Elder brother Achu's house) is a 1987 Indian Malayalam-language drama film written and directed by Balachandra Menon. Starring Nedumudi Venu, Balachandra Menon, Rohini Hattangadi, and Rohini. The music was composed by Vidyadharan and background score by Mohan Sithara.

== Plot ==
The story is about Achuthankutty Nair, his wife Rugmini and his two daughters, Aswathy and Karthi. Achuthan relocates to a rented apartment in Trivandrum. His dream is to build his own house and struggles for it. In his new neighborhood there is a men's hostel which creates a nuisance to his life. Vipin stays in the men's hostel and creates trouble for Achuthankutty and his family. This makes Achuthan tense day by day.

Achuthan dies unexpectedly due to a heart attack. Rugmini and her daughters are devastated due to his unexpected death. They are perplexed as to how the household will go on. They do not get any help from their family members since Achuthan had hatred towards them while alive. Vipin, who sympathized with the family, helps with every chance. He helps Aswathy, the elder daughter, to get a job and also helps Rugmini. Aswathy looks after the family but gets adamant and bold. This makes Rugmini sad. Apparently, Aswathy falls in love with David, a man of different caste.

Since both the families are orthodox, she seeks help of Vipin to arrange for the marriage. Vipin befriends David's father Jacob and cleverly agrees him for his son's marriage with Aswathy. During the wedding party, Vipin is insulted by Varma who was a friend of Achuthan. He talks bad about Vipin and Rugmini. Vipin reacts by slapping Varma. Aswathy gets furious and shouts which ends by insulting Vipin. He leaves, then Rugmini asks forgiveness for her daughter. Vipin is depressed and discusses the situation with his mother, who says there is nothing wrong with Aswathy because she has to protect the pride before her lover and his family. Then she asks Vipin to take over family business.

Rugmini and daughter Karthi get sad after Aswathy's marriage as they have no one to depend now. Rugmini adds poison with supper and decides to commit suicide with her daughter. Karthi understands her mother's feelings and says that she will not become like her sister and will look after her mother. This gives Rugmini motive to live for Karthi. Later Vipin's mother comes and tells Rugmini that she will help her find a job, so that she can fulfill Achuthan's dream of owning a house. In the end credits, it is shown that work has been started for Achuthan's dream house which signifies Rugmini's willpower.

== Cast ==
- Nedumudi Venu as Achuthankutty Nair
- Rohini Hattangadi as Rugmini Kunjamma
- Balachandra Menon as Vipin
- Rohini as Aswathy Nair
- Nangasseril Sasi as David
- Sukumaran as Prabhakaran
- Jagannatha Varma as Varma
- Meenakumari as Sarada
- Thilakan as Damodaran Nair
- Aranmula Ponnamma as Radhika, Achuthankutty's Mother
- T. P. Madhavan as Santhosh, Rugmini's Brother
- Sukumaran as Krishnankutty, Achuthankutty's Brother
- Sankaradi as Jacob
- Kaviyoor Ponnamma as Renuka, Vipin's Mother
- Adoor Bhawani as Mary

== Soundtrack ==
Track	Singer	Lyrics	Music
"Chandanam Manakkunna"	K. J. Yesudas	S. Ramesan Nair	Vidyadharan
"Chandanam Manakkunna"	K. S. Chitra	S. Ramesan Nair	Vidyadharan
