= Aayirathil Oruvan (2009 film) =

- Directed by: Sibi Malayil
- Written by: T. A. Razzaq
- Produced by: Siyad Koker
- Starring: Kalabhavan Mani; Sujitha; K. P. A. C. Lalitha
- Cinematography: Venu
- Edited by: L. Bhoominathan
- Music by: Mohan Sithara
- Distributed by: Kalasangham Films
- Release date: 20 February 2009
- Country: India
- Language: Malayalam

Aayirathil Oruvan (transl. One Man in a Thousand) is a 2009 Indian Malayalam-language drama film directed by Sibi Malayil, starring Kalabhavan Mani. The film, which was made in 2003, got a late release.

== Cast ==
- Kalabhavan Mani as Aravindan
- Sujitha as Saraswathi
- K. P. A. C. Lalitha as Padmavathi
- Thilakan as Krishnan
- Shammi Thilakan as Viswambharan
- Oduvil Unnikrishnan as Sreedharan
- Indrans as K. P. K. Nair
- Salim Kumar as Usman
- Irshad as Rameshan
- Anil Murali as Rajendran
- Hareesh Peradi as Satheeshan
- Kochu Preman as Kunjukuttan
- Senthil as Annachi
- Sudheesh as Babu
- Janardanan as Eenasu
- Madhupal as Dineshan
- Kozhikode Sharada as Cheeru Valliyamma
- Geeth Seth
- Anu Joseph as Ambika Aravindan's sister

== Soundtrack ==
The soundtrack of the film was composed by Mohan Sithara with lyrics by veteran poet and lyricist Yusuf Ali Kechery.

Song	Artist(s)
"Aayirathil Oruvan"	K. J. Yesudas
"Kalyana Praaya"	P. Jayachandran
"Kalyana Praaya"	Radhika Thilak
"Kani Kaanum"	K. S. Chithra, M. G. Sreekumar
"Madhu Vidhu"	K. S. Chithra
"Priya Thozha"	K. S. Chithra
"Priya Thozhi"	K. J. Yesudas

== Reception ==
Rediff.com gave the film 3.5 stars, saying "If not for anything else, you should see Aayirathil Oruvan if you are missing the old world charm in the movies these days". The Hindu wrote, "Though Ayirathil Oruvan, directed by Sibi Malayil, was in the can for four years, the movie scores a point for its story line and some brilliant performances".
