= Kasthuri Maan =

- Poster
- Directed by: A. K. Lohithadas
- Written by: A. K. Lohithadas; Jeyamohan (dialogues)
- Produced by: Sindhu Lohithadas
- Starring: Prasanna; Meera Jasmine; Shammi Thilakan
- Cinematography: Kichas; Vaidy S
- Edited by: Raja Mohammad; Sundar
- Music by: Ilaiyaraaja
- Production company: Sumangala Arts
- Release date: 28 October 2005
- Running time: 140 minutes
- Country: India
- Language: Tamil

Kasthuri Maan (transl. Musk deer) is a 2005 Indian Tamil-language film directed by A. K. Lohithadas. The film, a remake of the director's Malayalam film of the same name, and his only Tamil project, stars Prasanna and Meera Jasmine, who reprised her role from the original. It also features Shammi Thilakan, Sarath Babu, V. M. C. Haneefa, Bharathi Kannan, Pawan, Vinodini and Suja. Shammi and Haneefa also reprised their respective roles from the original. Kasthuri Maan's story revolves around a young college girl who helps her lover realize his dream of becoming an IAS officer amidst her own problems. The film released during Diwali 2005 and had a generally positive reception.

== Plot ==
The movie starts with a mature Arunachalam (Prasanna), now a district collector. The story is narrated in a flashback where his father Palaniappan (Sarath Babu) wants him to get married. Palaniappan used to be a rich film producer and had borrowed money from a rich person, but is unable to repay his debt. The rich man wants his daughter to marry Arun, but Arun does not want to marry.

Umashankari (Meera Jasmine) and Arun study in the same college. Uma is a lively, mischievous girl on campus, but at home, faces acute poverty and takes up various odd jobs to take care of her house and to stay away from her sister's husband, who makes advances towards her. In the meantime, Palaniappan attempts suicide because he is deeply in debt. Uma steps in and helps Arun, who is preparing for I.A.S. exams. She does everything to ensure that he becomes an I.A.S. officer. He in turn, promises to marry her and rescue her from her situation. However, Uma, after an unfortunate encounter with her brother-in–law, lands in prison, and the couple is reunited in the climax.

== Cast ==
- Prasanna as Arunachalam Palaniappan IAS, District Collector
- Meera Jasmine as Umashankari Vetrivel
- Shammi Thilakan as S. K. Nagarajan
- Sarath Babu as Palaniappan
- V. M. C. Haneefa
- Bharathi Kannan
- Pawan as Kasi
- Vinodini as Prema, Umashankari's sister
- Suja Varunee as Sunitha
- T. K. Kala
- Anjali Devi as Vadivammal
- Geetha Ravishankar as Arun's mother
- Kulappulli Leela as Muniyamma
- Devi Chandana as Arunachalam's sister

Uncredited

- Sai Pallavi as College student
- Kadhal Saravanan as Supervisor

== Soundtrack ==
The soundtrack was composed by Ilaiyaraaja.

Song	Singers	Lyrics
"Oru Porkaalam"	Karthik, Manjari	Palani Bharathi
"Ketkalyo"	Tippu, Manjari, Chorus	Muthulingam
"Nethu Varaikkum"	Sujatha	Na. Muthukumar
"Ennai Ketkum"	Tippu	Vaali
"Vaanin Kadhal"	Manjari, Tippu, Ganga	Mu. Metha

== Critical reception ==
The Hindu wrote, "Sumangala Arts and maker A.K.Lohithadas...deserve to be lauded for not succumbing to the lure of the commercial format and dwelling on a moving storyline that has comedy, sentiment, romance and passion in right proportions. And all these blend with the story to form a cohesive whole". Lajjavathi of Kalki praised the acting of Prasanna, Meera Jasmine and other actors, realistic fights, Jayamohan's dialogues and Ilaiyaraaja's music.

== Accolades ==
Meera Jasmine won the Tamil Nadu State Film Award Special Prize for Best Actress. The film won the Tamil Nadu State Film Award for Best Film Portraying Woman in Good Light.
