= Chenkol =

- Poster
- Directed by: Sibi Malayil
- Written by: A. K. Lohithadas
- Produced by: N. Krishnakumar
- Starring: Mohanlal; Thilakan; Surbhi Javeri Vyas; Mohan Raj; Kaviyoor Ponnamma
- Cinematography: Venu
- Edited by: L. Bhoominathan
- Music by: Johnson
- Production company: Kripa Films
- Distributed by: Kripa; V.A.P.
- Release date: 10 December 1993
- Running time: 163 minutes
- Country: India
- Language: Malayalam

Chenkol (transl. Sceptre) is a 1993 Indian Malayalam-language action drama film directed by Sibi Malayil and written by A. K. Lohithadas. A sequel to the 1989 film Kireedam, the story continues Sethumadhavan's (Mohanlal) story after his prison term and his life back into society. The movie was produced by Krishnakumar. It also features Thilakan, Surbhi Javeri Vyas, Mohan Raj, and Kaviyoor Ponnamma. The film's music was composed by Johnson.

== Plot ==
Sethumadhavan "Sethu" is released after serving imprisonment of seven years in central jail for murdering Keerikadan Jose, a hardcore criminal. Though it was by accident, which he did to save his life, society is not ready to accept it. For them, he is now a hardcore criminal who had killed someone who ruled the streets for long years. Upon release, Sethu visits the medical college to meet his younger brother, Rameshan, who is doing a course in medicine. However, Rameshan responds coldly and indirectly asks Sethu not to make any further visits as it may hurt his reputation.

Sethu realizes that the world around him has undergone a severe change. At home though, his mother, Ammu, is elated to see him, but his father, Achuthan Nair, is not too keen on having him at home. Achuthan Nair, who always wanted Sethu to be a police inspector, broke down completely after Sethu's conviction and turned into an alcoholic. Remorseful, Sethu looks forward to building up a life outside the jail but fails to find employment due to the tag of an "ex-convict" labeled on him.

Sethu tries to catch up with his old friend, Najeeb, who tells him about the present physical condition of Parameshwaran, whom Sethu had severely assaulted in a bid to save his own life. Fully paralysed, Parameshwaran now runs a cycle repair shop with the help of his wife and daughter. Sethu meets Parameshawaran, now a completely changed man. With his help, Sethu begins selling fish for a living. Keerikadan Jose had an affair with another woman named Madhavi Varma and had two children, Indu and her brother. The illegitimate wife and children of Keerikadan Jose suffer constant threats from his family after his death. The siblings of Jose, who were looking for a chance to unleash vengeance upon Sethu, attack him violently. He is saved by Indu, who happens to be the illegitimate daughter of Keerikadan Jose. She expresses sympathy for him and encourages him to live a new life. Once, in a bid to escape from the Keerikadan brothers, Sethu beats them up. Achuthan Nair blames Sethu and asks him to stay away from their house, which he agrees to. However, Sethu gradually realizes that for others, he is still a criminal.

The local police officer warns Sethu for no reason and humiliates him, which creates deep mental anguish in him. He undergoes deep psychological torture, which slowly transforms him into another person. To counter the attacks from Keerikadan's family, Sethu becomes a thug of a local businessman. He slowly becomes a hardcore criminal and has several criminal cases pending at the police station. However, he overcomes them and withdraws the cases with the help of local politicians. With time, his relationship with Indu grows, and he asks her mother for her hand in marriage, which she refuses, flatly citing that he is a criminal whose life has no guarantee. This incident strikes him deeply, and he decides to change. In the meantime, Sethu shockingly finds out that his sister, under the veil of drama acting, is into prostitution, that too with their father acting as the pimp. This is a severe mental blow to Sethu, and he reacts violently to his father. Achuthan Nair, unable to face his son, commits suicide by hanging himself on the ceiling fan of a hotel where the business takes place. Sethu now shifts back to his old village with the rest of his family and starts farming.

Slowly, Madhavi agrees to get Indu married to Sethu, but their teenage son maintains a bitter hatred towards Sethu. Karadi Antony, a dangerous criminal and the younger brother of Keerikadan is now released from jail and is back to avenge his brother's death. He hunts down Sethu and Indu's family but is killed by Sethu. However, he is shocked when the illegitimate son of Keerikadan (brother of Indu), at this crucial moment, fatally stabs Sethu. Sethu advises him to run away from the spot to save himself, otherwise, he will end up as another criminal of circumstances. Watching him run away, Sethu closes his eyes. At the time of his death, the tagline shows the following; "The story of a prince who lost his crown and sceptre ends here".

== Cast ==
- Mohanlal as Sethumadhavan, now an ex-convict and troubled man
- Thilakan as Retd. Police Head Constable Achuthan Nair, Sethu's father
- Surbhi Javeri Vyas as Indu
- Jojan Kanjany as Keerikadan Antony (Karadi), the main antagonist who is Keerikadan Jose's brother.
- Usha as Latha, Sethu's younger sister
- Mohan Raj as Keerikkadan Jose, Indu's foster father and Sethu's deceased enemy.
- Kaviyoor Ponnamma as Ammu, Achuthan Nair's wife and Sethu's mother
- Sreenath as Keshu, Sethu's friend
- Sankaradi as Krishnan Nair, Sethu's maternal uncle and Devi's father
- Santhakumari as Bharathi, Krishnan Nair's wife, Devi's mother, and Sethu's aunt
- Cochin Haneefa as Haidrose
- Kundara Johny as Parameshwaran
- Spadikam George as Keerikkadan Thomas, Jose's elder brother
- Meghanathan as Keerikkadan Sunny, Jose's younger brother
- Mamukkoya as ASI Hameed
- Shammi Thilakan as SI John Mathew, the aggressive and cruel police officer who has a strong hatred against Sethu.
- Maniyanpilla Raju as Najeeb, a shopkeeper and Hameed's son, Sethu's friend.
- Shanthi Krishna as Madhavi Varma, Jose's second wife and Indu's mother
- Yadukrishnan as Rameshan, Sethu's youngest brother and a student of medicine
- Kanakalatha as Ambika, Sethu's divorced elder sister
- Nandu as Ratheesh, Prisoner
- Shivaji as Diwakaran
- Kothuku Nanappan

== Soundtrack ==
The songs were composed by Johnson master and lyrics were penned by Kaithapram.

| Track | Song title | Singer(s) | Raga |
|---|---|---|---|
| 1 | Pathira Paalkadavil | K. J. Yesudas, Sujatha Mohan | Kalyani |
| 2 | Madhuram Jeevamrutha | K. J. Yesudas | Kapi |
| 3 | Madhuram Jeevamrutha | K. S. Chithra | Kapi |

== Awards ==
Kerala State Film Awards

- Best Playback Singer (Male) – K. J. Yesudas

Kerala Film Critics Award

- Second Best Actress – Kaviyoor Ponnamma
- Best Male Playback Singer – K. J. Yesudas
- Best Female Playback Singer – Sujatha Mohan

== Reception ==
The film was released on 10 December 1993. In an interview in August 1997, praising Mohanlal's performance, Lohithadas said, "I feel he performed the best in Chenkol. Then comes Kireedom. And Bharatham comes only later. In Chenkol he surprised me with his expressions. There was an amazing quality in the way he walked, talked and even sat".
