= Sasneham =

Sasneham...
- Theatrical release poster
- Directed by: Sathyan Anthikad
- Written by: Lohithadas
- Produced by: Castle Productions
- Starring: Balachandra Menon; Shobana; Innocent; Sukumari; Oduvil Unnikrishnan; K. P. A. C. Lalitha; Mamukkoya; Karamana Janardanan Nair; Paravoor Bharathan
- Cinematography: Vipin Mohan
- Edited by: K. Rajagopal
- Music by: Johnson
- Production company: Castle Productions
- Distributed by: Century Films
- Release date: 1990
- Country: India
- Language: Malayalam

Sasneham... (translation: With Love) is a 1990 Malayalam language family film written by Lohithadas and directed by Sathyan Anthikad. It stars Balachandra Menon, Shobana, Innocent, Sukumari, Oduvil Unnikrishnan, Mamukkoya, Karamana Janardanan Nair, and Paravoor Bharathan.

Johnson composed the music for the film, with lyrics by P. K. Gopi. G. Venugopal won the Kerala State Film Award for Best Singer for the song "Thaane Poovitta Moham". The film was remade in Tamil as Manasu Rendum Pudhusu and in Telugu as Master Kapuram.

== Cast ==
- Balachandra Menon as Thomas Kurian aka Thomaskutty, a schoolteacher
- Shobana as Saraswathy aka Sarasu
- Innocent as Eenashu, Thomaskutty's brother-in-law
- Sukumari as Meenakshy Ammal, Saraswathy's aunt
- Meena as Eliamma Ammachi, Thomaskutty's mother
- Oduvil Unnikrishnan as Srinivasa Iyer, Saraswathy's uncle
- K. P. A. C. Lalitha as Rosie, Thomaskutty's elder sister and Eenashu's wife
- Mamukkoya as Appukkuttan, the cook
- Karamana Janardanan Nair as Thamaraserry Kuriachan, Thomaskutty's father
- Paravoor Bharathan as Narayana Iyer, Saraswathy's father
- Sankaradi as Padmanabhan Nair, the house owner
- Philomina as Veronica, Eenashu's mother
- Santha Devi as School principal
- Thesni Khan as a nurse

== Soundtrack ==
All lyrics are written by P. K. Gopi; all music is composed by Johnson.

Track listing
No.	Title	Artist(s)	Length
1.	"Maangalyapoovilirikkum"	K. S. Chithra	4:13
2.	"Thaane Poovitta Moham"	G. Venugopal	4:34
