= A. K. Lohithadas =

Indian film director and screenwriter

- Born: 10 May 1955; Chalakudy, Thrissur district, Kerala
- Died: 28 June 2009 (aged 54); Kochi, Kerala
- Occupations: Screenwriter, playwright, director, producer
- Years active: 1987–2009

Ambazhathil Karunakaran Lohithadas (10 May 1955 – 28 June 2009) was an Indian screenwriter, playwright, film maker, and producer who worked in the Malayalam film industry. In a career spanning over two decades, his films have won a National Film Award, six Kerala State Film Awards, and fourteen Kerala Film Critics Award for Best Script.

Lohithadas made his debut as a screenwriter with Thaniyavarthanam (1987). He has written screenplays for 35 films in a 24-year-long career, such as Ezhuthapurangal (1987), Vicharana (1988), Kireedam (1989), Dasharatham (1989), Mrugaya (1989), His Highness Abdullah (1990), Sasneham (1990), Bharatham (1991), Amaram (1991), Aadhaaram (1992), Kamaladalam (1992), Vatsalyam (1993), Venkalam (1993), Padheyam (1993), Chenkol (1993), Chakoram (1994), Thooval Kottaram (1996), Sallapam (1996), and Veendum Chila Veettukaryangal (1999). He later became a director, and made his directorial debut with Bhoothakkannadi (1997). He later wrote and directed Karunyam (1997), Kanmadam (1998), Joker (2000),Soothradharan(2001) and Kasthooriman (2003).

== Early life ==
Lohithadas (or 'Lohi,' as he is often referred to) was born on 5 May 1955 in Chalakudy, Thrissur district, Kerala, as the son of Lakshmi and Karunakaran of the Ambazhathuparambil house. He considered Chalakudy as his base for most of his writings and centered himself with his friends during his stays in his hometown.

== Career ==
Lohi's first movie screenplay was Thaniyavarthanam, directed by Sibi Malayil. Malayil and Lohithadas would later produce several Malayalam movies together. His screenplay works for Sibi Malayil are Thaniyavarthanam (1987), Dasharatham (1989), Kireedam (1989), His Highness Abdullah (1990), Bharatham (1990), Dhanam (1991), Kamaladalam (1992), and Chenkol (1993). Other works include Veendum Chila Veettukaryangal (1999), Sasneham (1990) for Sathyan Anthikkad and Amaram, Venkalam(1991) for Bharathan.

He later became a filmmaker and made works such as Bhoothakkannadi (1997), Karunyam (1997), Kanmadam (1998), Arayannangalude Veedu (2000), Joker (2000),Soothradharan(2001) Kasthooriman (2003) (which he himself produced), and Nivedyam (2007). Most of his works were critically and commercially successful. His works were recognised from his very first venture Thaniyavarthanam, which brought him the Kerala State Film Award for Best Story.

Nizhalukal Inachernna Naattuvazhikal ('നിഴലുകൾ ഇണചേർന്ന നാട്ടുവഴികൾ' – എം. ശബരീഷ്, പാപ്പാത്തി ബുക്സ്) is a book about his life and film career.

== Death ==
While residing at his home in Aluva, he experienced chest pain and was rushed to the Lisie Hospital in Kochi, where he died of a heart attack on 28 June 2009. His body was taken to his home in Lakkidi in Palakkad district, where he was cremated with full state honours. He is survived by his wife Sindhu Lohithadas and their two sons, Harikrishnan and Vijayashankar.

== Awards ==
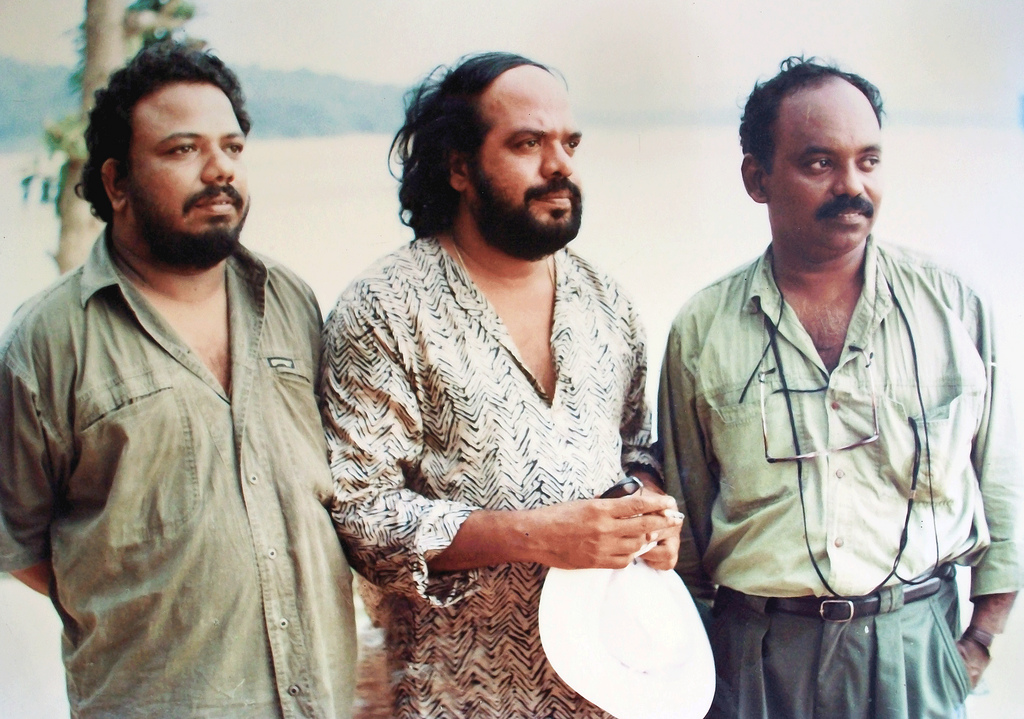
Lohithadas along with director Bharathan and cinematographer Ramachandra Babu at the location of Venkalam

National Film Awards

- 1998 – Indira Gandhi Award for Best Debut Film of a Director – Bhoothakannadi

Kerala State Film Awards

- 1987 – Best Story – Thaniyavarthanam
- 1997 – Best Film – Bhoothakannadi
- 1997 – Best Screen Play – Bhoothakkannadi

Tamil Nadu State Film Awards

- 2005 – Tamil Nadu State Film Award for Best Film Portraying Woman in Good Light – Kasthuri Maan

Kerala Film Critics Association Awards

- 1989 – Best Screenplay – Dasharatham
- 1991 – Best Screenplay – Bharatham
- 1996 – Best Screenplay – Sallapam, Thooval Kottaram
- 1997 – Second Best Film – Bhoothakkannadi
- 1997 – Best Story – Bhoothakkannadi
- 1998 – Second Best Film – Ormacheppu
- 1998 – Best Screenplay – Ormacheppu
- 1998 – Second Best Film – Nivedyam
- 1999 – Best Screenplay – Veendum Chila Veettukaryangal
- 2003 – Second Best Film – Kasthooriman

Asianet Film Award

- 1999 – Best Script Writer Award – Veendum Chila Veettu Karyangal

== Filmography ==
=== Screenwriter ===
Year	Title	Director
2007	Nivedyam	Self
2006	Chakkara Muthu	Self
2005	Kasthuri Maan (Tamil)	Self
2003	Chakram	Self
2003	Kasthooriman	Self
2001	Soothradharan	Self
2000	Arayannangalude Veedu	Self
2000	Joker	Self
1999	Veendum Chila Veettukaryangal	Sathyan Anthikkad
1998	Ormacheppu	Self
1998	Kanmadam	Self
1997	Karunyam	Self
1997	Bhoothakannadi	Self
1996	Sallapam	Sundardas
1996	Thooval Kottaram	Sathyan Anthikkad
1996	Udhyanapalakan	Harikumar
1995	Saadaram	Jose Thomas
1994	Chakoram	Venu
1994	Sagaram Sakshi	Sibi Malayil
1993	Chenkol	Sibi Malayil
1993	Padheyam	Bharathan
1993	Vatsalyam	Cochin Haneefa
1993	Venkalam	Bharathan
1992	Kamaladalam	Sibi Malayil
1992	Valayam	Sibi Malayil
1992	Kauravar	Joshi
1992	Aadharam	George Kithu
1991	Dhanam	Sibi Malayil
1991	Amaram	Bharathan
1991	Bharatham	Sibi Malayil
1991	Kanalkkattu	Sathyan Anthikkad
1990	His Highness Abdullah	Sibi Malayil
1990	Sasneham	Sathyan Anthikkad
1990	Kuttettan	Joshi
1990	Radha Madhavam	Suresh Unnithan
1990	Maalayogam	Sibi Malayil
1989	Mrigaya	I. V. Sasi
1989	Mahayanam	Joshi
1989	Mudra	Sibi Malayil
1989	Jaathakam	Suresh Unnithan
1989	Dasharatham	Sibi Malayil
1989	Kireedam	Sibi Malayil
1988	Mukthi	I. V. Sasi
1988	Kudumbapuranam	Sathyan Anthikkad
1988	Vicharana	Sibi Malayil
1987	Ezhuthapurangal	Sibi Malayil
1987	Thaniyavarthanam	Sibi Malayil

=== Director ===
Year	Title
1997	Bhoothakannadi
1997	Karunyam
1998	Ormacheppu
1998	Kanmadam
2000	Arayannangalude Veedu
2000	Joker
2001	Soothradharan
2003	Kasthoorimann
2003	Chakram
2005	Kasthuri Maan (Tamil)
2006	Chakkara Muthu
2007	Nivedyam

=== Actor ===
Year	Title	Role
1992	Valayam	Villager
1999	Veendum Chila Veettukaryangal	Himself
2001	Kaatu Vannu Vilichappol	Himself
2002	Stop Violence	Himself
2005	The Campus	Himself
2005	Udayananu Tharam	Director Prathapan
2006	Out Of Syllabus	Himself
