= Radha Madhavam =

1990 film by Suresh Unnithan

- Directed by: Suresh Unnithan
- Written by: Lohithadas
- Screenplay by: Lohithadas
- Produced by: Ali
- Starring: Jayaram; Thilakan; Geetha; Parvathy Jayaram
- Cinematography: Ramachandra Babu
- Edited by: G. Murali
- Music by: Vidyadharan
- Production company: Mac Productions
- Distributed by: Mac Productions
- Release date: 20 December 1990
- Country: India
- Language: Malayalam

Radha Madhavam is a 1990 Indian Malayalam film, directed by Suresh Unnithan and produced by Ali. The film stars Jayaram, Thilakan, Geetha and Parvathy in the lead roles. The film has musical score by Vidyadharan.

== Plot ==
Sudha, a young actress, is happy to be in a live-in relationship with an aged writer, Anadapadmanabhan. However, problems start brewing once Anadapadmanabhan's adopted son enters their lives.

== Cast ==
- Jayaram as Hari
- Thilakan as N. S. Anadapadmanabhan
- Geetha as Sudha
- Parvathy Jayaram as Ammu
- Innocent as E. Chandhu Nair
- KPAC Lalitha as Padmini
- Shankaradi
- Shammi Thilakan

== Soundtrack ==
The music was composed by Vidyadharan.

No.	Song	Singers	Lyrics	Length (m:ss)
1	"Ezhu Nirangalulla Kuppivala"	K. S. Chithra	O. N. V. Kurup	
2	"Kasthoori Thilakam" (Krishna Nee)	M. G. Sreekumar	O. N. V. Kurup	
3	"Kasthoori Thilakam" (Krishna Nee Begane)	K. S. Chithra	O. N. V. Kurup	
4	"Mandahaasa Pushpangalile"	M. G. Sreekumar	O. N. V. Kurup	
5	"Neelaanjana Mizhiyithal"	M. G. Sreekumar	O. N. V. Kurup	
6	"Nrithyathi Nrithyathi"	M. G. Sreekumar	O. N. V. Kurup	
7	"Smarasadaa Maanasa"	M. G. Sreekumar	O. N. V. Kurup	
