= Ormacheppu =

- Directed by: Lohithadas
- Produced by: Lal; Ousepachan Vaalakuzhy
- Starring: Lal; Chanchal; Dileep
- Music by: Johnson
- Release date: 3 September 1998
- Country: India
- Language: Malayalam

Ormacheppu is a 1998 Indian Malayalam-language psychological thriller film, directed by Lohithadas and starring Lal, Chanchal and Dileep. The film received the Film Critics Awards for Best Script.

== Cast ==
- Lal as Jeevan George
- Chanchal as Sameera
- Dileep as Radhakrishnan
- Biju Menon as Mohan
- Janardhanan as Kurian
- Riza Bava as Jose George
- Lalu Alex as George
- Sreehari as Kunjammavan
- Baburaj as Police Officer

== Production ==
The climax portions of the film was shot at Valparai and a scene featuring Lal and Biju Menon was shot inside a tea factory. The film is one of two directed by A. K. Lohithadas to be released in 1998, with Kanmadam.

== Music ==
The movie features an acclaimed soundtrack composed by maestro Johnson with lyrics by Kaithapram Damodaran Namboothiri.

Track #	Song	Artist(s)	Raga
1	"Unmaadam"	K. J. Yesudas, K. S. Chithra	Pahadi
2	"Yamini Mandapangal"	K. J. Yesudas, Sindhu	
3	"Viraham"	K. J. Yesudas	
4	"Yaamini Mandapangal"	K. S. Chithra, Sindhu	
