= Arayannangalude Veedu =

2000 Indian film

- Directed by: A. K. Lohithadas
- Written by: A. K. Lohithadas
- Starring: Mammootty
- Cinematography: Venugopal
- Edited by: G. Murali
- Music by: Raveendran; Gireesh Puthenchery (Lyrics); Johnson (BGM)
- Release date: March 2000
- Country: India
- Language: Malayalam

Arayannangalude Veedu (transl. Home of Swans) is a 2000 Indian Malayalam-language film written and directed by A. K. Lohithadas. The film stars Mammootty in the lead role with Kaviyoor Ponnamma, Lakshmi Gopalaswamy, Devan, Oduvil Unnikrishnan, Siddique, Jomol, Krishna Kumar, Cochin Haneefa, Lal and Bindu Panicker in supporting roles.

== Plot ==
Raveendranath, a worker at Bhilai steel plant, leads a happy family life. His small family consists of Seetha, his north Indian wife, and two daughters Lakshmi, named after his mother, and Chinnu, named after his childhood girlfriend. Ravi fled from his home during his teenage days due to being verbally and physically abused by his father throughout his childhood and has no connection with anyone back home. The sudden death of his colleague makes Ravi think about his roots and he makes a sudden visit to his house with his wife and kids.

At home, things have changed a lot in the past 18 years. Govindankutty Menon, Ravi's father had died seven years ago. Rajendranath, his elder brother still isn't welcoming to Ravi due to a past sibling abuse. Ravi was falsely implicated in a sexual affair with his maternal cousin, Premalatha - by his cunning elder brother Rajendran, when actually Rajendranath had raped Premalatha in the past. Premalatha marries a policeman who is also an abusive alcoholic and they have a daughter, Suja. Later in the film, Sreedharan, Ravi's maternal uncle, and mother reveal to Ravi that they became aware of Rajendranath's treachery through Prema.

His younger brother Hari and sister Sunanda are afraid that a part of the family property will be now handed over to Ravi. But Geetha, another sister, is very happy to see him. After seeing him, the health of his mother improves and she asks him to stay for the rest of her life knowing him not to be the cause of a heinous history in their family. In a short time, Ravi succeeds in winning the hearts of his siblings and leaves for Bhilai; this time taking his mother with him.

== Cast ==
- Mammootty as Raveendranath Menon
- Lakshmi Gopalaswamy as Seetha, Ravi's wife
- Kaviyoor Ponnamma as Lakshmi, Ravi's mother
- Devan as Rajendranath Menon, Ravi's elder brother
- Krishna Kumar as Hareendranath Menon, Ravi's younger brother
- Shivaji as DIG Govindankutty Menon, Ravi's father
- Siddique as Suresh Nair, Geetha's husband
- Kripa as Lakshmi aka Lechu, Ravi's daughter
- Oduvil Unnikrishnan as Sreedharan, Ravi's uncle
- Sona Nair as Geetha, Ravi's sister
- Jomol as Suja, Premaletha's daughter
- Haseena Bhanu as Neena, Hari's wife
- Lal as Sukumaran
- T. P. Madhavan as Neena's father
- Mayoori as Ragini, Ravi's adolescent love interest
- Devi. S as Young Ragini
- Cochin Haneefa as Gangadharan Sunanda's husband
- Bindu Panicker as Sunanda
- Reshmi Soman as Premalatha
- Reena as Dr. Radha, Rajendra Menon's wife
- Sreehari as Divakaran
- Zeenath as Laila, Hameed's wife
- Vishnuprakash as Hameed
- Sathaar as Sudhakaran

== Soundtrack ==
Music: Raveendran, Lyrics: Gireesh Puthenchery

- "Deenadayaalo Raamaa" (D) - K. J. Yesudas, Gayatri Asokan
- "Deenadayaalo Raamaa" (M) - K. J. Yesudas
- "Kaakkappoo Kaithappoo" - P. Jayachandran, Mano
- "Kaanaathe Melle" - K. J. Yesudas
- "Manassin Manichimizhil" (F) - K. S. Chitra
- "Manassin Manichimizhil" (M) - K. J. Yesudas
