= Saadaram =

Sadaram
- Directed by: Jose Thomas
- Written by: A. K. Lohithadas
- Produced by: N. Krishnakumar (Kireedam Unni)
- Starring: Suresh Gopi; Geetha; Sreenath; Lalu Alex; Suvarna Mathew
- Music by: Johnson
- Production company: Kripa Films
- Distributed by: Kireedam Release
- Release date: 1995
- Running time: 150 minutes
- Country: India
- Language: Malayalam

Saadaram (also spelled as Sadaram) is a 1995 Malayalam film directed by Jose Thomas and stars Suresh Gopi, Lalu Alex, Geetha, Suvarna Mathew, Chithra, Sreenath, Kaviyoor Ponnamma and Sukumari main roles. The script was written by A. K. Lohithadas. The film was dubbed into Tamil as Mr. Deva.

== Plot ==
Though a lawyer by profession, Raghunandan Menon finds happiness in farming. He leads a happy life along with his family consisting of mother, elder brother, and his family. Raghunandan's fiancée Lekha is a research student in literature. One night, on a usual walk through his farm, Raghu saves a severely wounded girl. On the next morning, she introduces herself as Seethalakshmi and informs him that she was brutally raped by gang of men, who later dumped her. Raghu offers her shelter in his farmhouse for next couple of days. Lekha, who happened to make a surprise visit finds Sethu in the farmhouse, whom she mistakes to be having an affair with Raghu. His explanations fail to convince her. Up on knowing about a girl staying at the farmhouse, Harinandan Menon, the elder brother, who is also a senior police officer arrives at the farmhouse. He is shocked to see Seethalakshmi and returns suddenly without saying anything. Seetha explains Raghu that Hari was one among those men who raped her. On reaching home to know more about the incident, Hari confesses of his mistake and tries to justify that he was in an inebriated condition. But Raghu is adamant of giving justice to Seetha. Raghu in attempt of bringing justice to Seetha faces severe opposition from within his house including his mom, fiancée and sister-in law. Upon knowing that Seetha is a rape victim, Madhavan her fiancé shows his unwillingness to accept her. In order to give a new life to her, Raghu marries Seetha and brings her to his house. But at home, he is asked by his sister-in law not to bring Seetha inside. Raghu takes Seetha and drives away.

== Cast ==
- Suresh Gopi as Adv.Raghunandan Menon
- Lalu Alex as DySP Harinandan Menon
- Geetha as Seethalakshmi
- Kaviyoor Ponnamma as Bhanumathi
- Chithra as Malathi
- Sivaji as Gangadharan Menon
- Madhupal as Nazar
- Sreenath as Ravichandra Menon
- Mammukoya as Veerappan (Kunjalu)
- Priyanka Anoop as Dakshayani
- Bindu Panikkar as Rama
- Suvarna Mathew as Lekha
- Spadikam George as Police Officer
- Ravi Vallathol as Madhavan
- Kozhikode Narayanan Nair as Sankara Warrier
- Sonia Baiju as Jessy
- Anila Sreekumar as Kallu
- Reshmi Soman as Sreekutty
- Devi S as Arya

== Soundtrack ==
- "Madhuchandrike (male)" - K. J. Yesudas
- "Sarathkala" - K. J. Yesudas, Sujatha Mohan
- "Ambalakkombante" - M. G. Sreekumar
- "Madhuchandrike (female)" - Swarnalatha

== Box office ==
This film was big hit at box office. It ran more 100 days successfully in theatres.

== Sources ==
- Rajadhyaksha, Ashish; Willemen, Paul (1998) [1994]. Encyclopaedia of Indian Cinema (PDF). Oxford University Press. ISBN 0-19-563579-5.
