= Ezhuthapurangal =

- Directed by: Sibi Malayil
- Written by: A. K. Lohithadas
- Screenplay by: A. K. Lohithadas
- Produced by: Mathew George
- Starring: Suhasini Maniratnam; Ambika; Parvathy Jayaram; Murali
- Cinematography: S. Kumar
- Edited by: Bhoominathan
- Music by: Johnson; Vidyadharan
- Production company: Central Production
- Distributed by: Central Production
- Release date: 3 January 1987
- Country: India
- Language: Malayalam

Ezhuthapurangal (transl. Blank pages) is a 1987 Indian Malayalam-language film directed by Sibi Malayil and produced by Mathew George. The film stars Suhasini Maniratnam, Ambika, Parvathy Jayaram and Murali in the lead roles. The film has musical score by Johnson and songs by Johnson and Vidyadharan. Suhasini Mani Ratnam won the Kerala State Film Award For Best Actress for this film.

== Plot ==
The story deals with three socially forward women, their friendship and the troubles they face in a male-dominated society. Rajalakshmi is a college lecturer and writer whose fiancée is not able to accept her ideals. Vimala is a divorced advocate bringing up a child on her own. Seetha is a college teacher, who is leading an unhappy married life with her husband.

== Cast ==
- Suhasini as Rajalakshmi (voice by Aanandavally)
- Ambika as Vimala Jacob (voice by Bhagyalakshmi)
- Parvathy Jayaram as Seetha (voice by Sreeja)
- Murali as Raveendranath
- Nedumudi Venu as Balakrishna Menon
- Babu Namboothiri as Binoy Chandy
- Sreenath as Sreenivasan
- Balachandran Chullikad as Balan
- K. P. A. C. Sunny as Advocate
- Kollam Thulasi as Judge
- Kothuku Nanappan as Gopalan Nair
- Ranjith as Ramanandan

== Soundtrack ==
The music was composed by Nedumudi Venu, Vidyadharan and Balachandran Chullikkad and the lyrics were written by O. N. V. Kurup, Balachandran Chullikkad and Nedumudi Venu.

| No. | Song | Singers | Lyrics | Length (m:ss) |
|---|---|---|---|---|
| 1 | "Paaduvaanaay Vannu" | K. J. Yesudas, K. S. Chithra, Nedumudi Venu | O. N. V. Kurup | |
| 2 | "Paaduvaanay Vannu" (Bit) | K. S. Chithra | O. N. V. Kurup | |
| 3 | "Paampu Kadicha" | Balachandran Chullikkad | Balachandran Chullikkad | |
| 4 | "Thaalolam Paithal" | K. S. Chithra | O. N. V. Kurup | |
| 5 | "Thaalolam Paithal" (Bit) | K. S. Chithra | O. N. V. Kurup | |
| 6 | "Unni Kettipothinja" | Nedumudi Venu | Nedumudi Venu | |
