= Lakkidi, Palakkad =

Lakkidi Lakkidi Perur
- Village
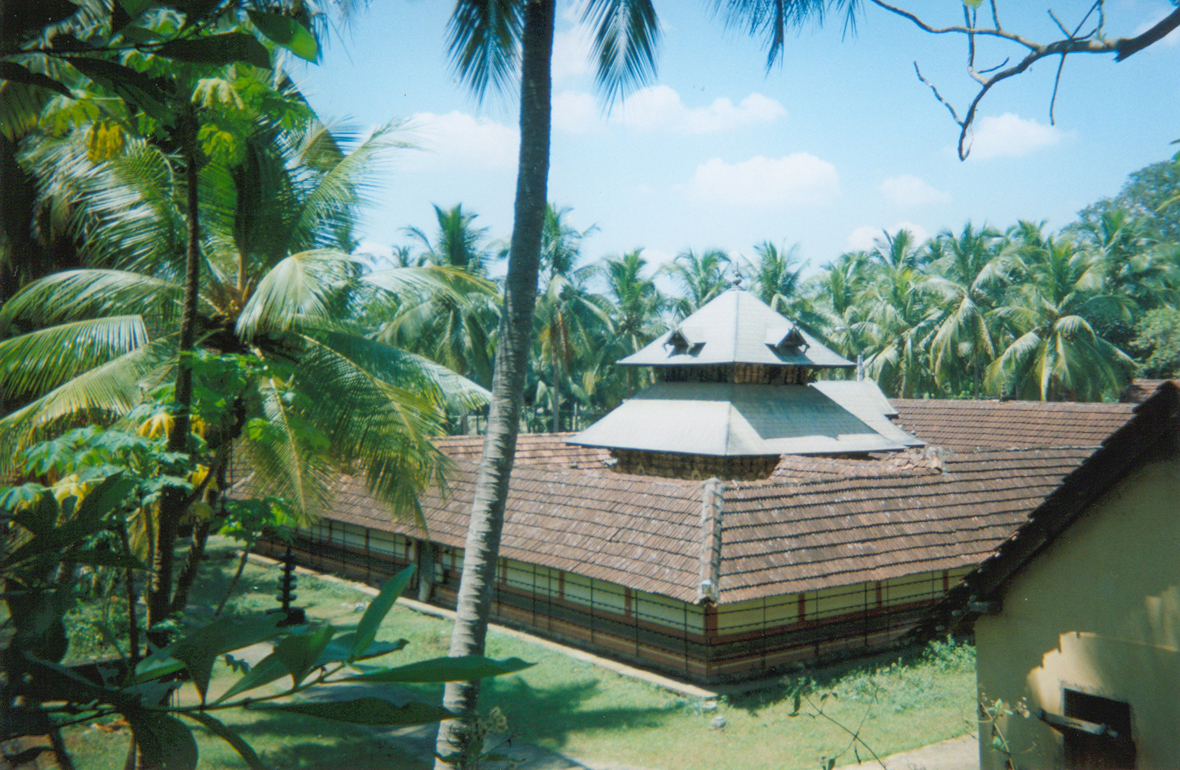
- Mahadeva Temple, Killikkurussimangalam

- Location in Kerala, India Lakkidi (India)
- Coordinates: 10°45′52″N 76°26′22″E
- Country: India
- State: Kerala
- District: Palakkad

Languages
  - Official: Malayalam, English
- Time zone: UTC+5:30 (IST)
- PIN: 679301
- Telephone code: 0466 2230000
- Vehicle registration: KL-51, KL-9
- Nearest city: Ottapalam
- Literacy: 100%%
- Lok Sabha constituency: Palakkad

Lakkidi or Lakkidi Perur is a small village in Ottapalam Taluk of Palakkad district, Kerala, India. It is located 23 km west of Palakkad on the Palakkad - Pattambi Road. The nearest town is Ottapalam, which is 10 km away. Lakkidi is situated 303 km from the state capital, Thiruvananthapuram. The pin code of Lakkidi Post Office is 679301 and the STD code is 0466.

== History ==
This place was originally part of the Valluvanad Swaroopam dynasty. Valluvanad was an erstwhile late medieval feudal state in present state of Kerala in South India extending from the Bharathapuzha River in the south to the Pandalur Mala in the north during their zenith in the early Middle Ages. On the west, it was bounded by the Arabian Sea at the port Ponnani and on the east by Attappadi Hills.

== Legends ==
According to local legends, the last Later Chera ruler gave a vast extension of land in South Malabar to one of their governors, Valluvakkonithiri and left for a hajj. The Valluvakkonithiri was also given last Later Chera ruler's shield (presumably to defend himself from the sword received by the Samoothiri (Zamorin) of Kozhikode, another governor, from the departing ruler). Not surprisingly, the Vellatiri rajas were hereditary enemies of the Samoothiri. Valluvanad is famous for the Mamankam festivals, held once in 12 years and the endless wars against the Samoothiri of Kozhikode. By the late 18th century, Vellatiri or Walluwanad proper was the sole remaining territory of the Walluvanad raja (Valluva Konatiri), who once exercised suzerain rights over a large portion of Southern Malabar. Although management of the country was restored to the Vellatiri raja in 1792, it soon became evident that he was powerless to repress the trouble that quickly broke out between Mapillas (favored by the Mysorean occupiers) and nayars (who sought to restore the ancien régime), and already in 1793 management of the district had to be resumed as the chief and his family fled to Travancore.
