= Sibi Malayil =

Indian film director

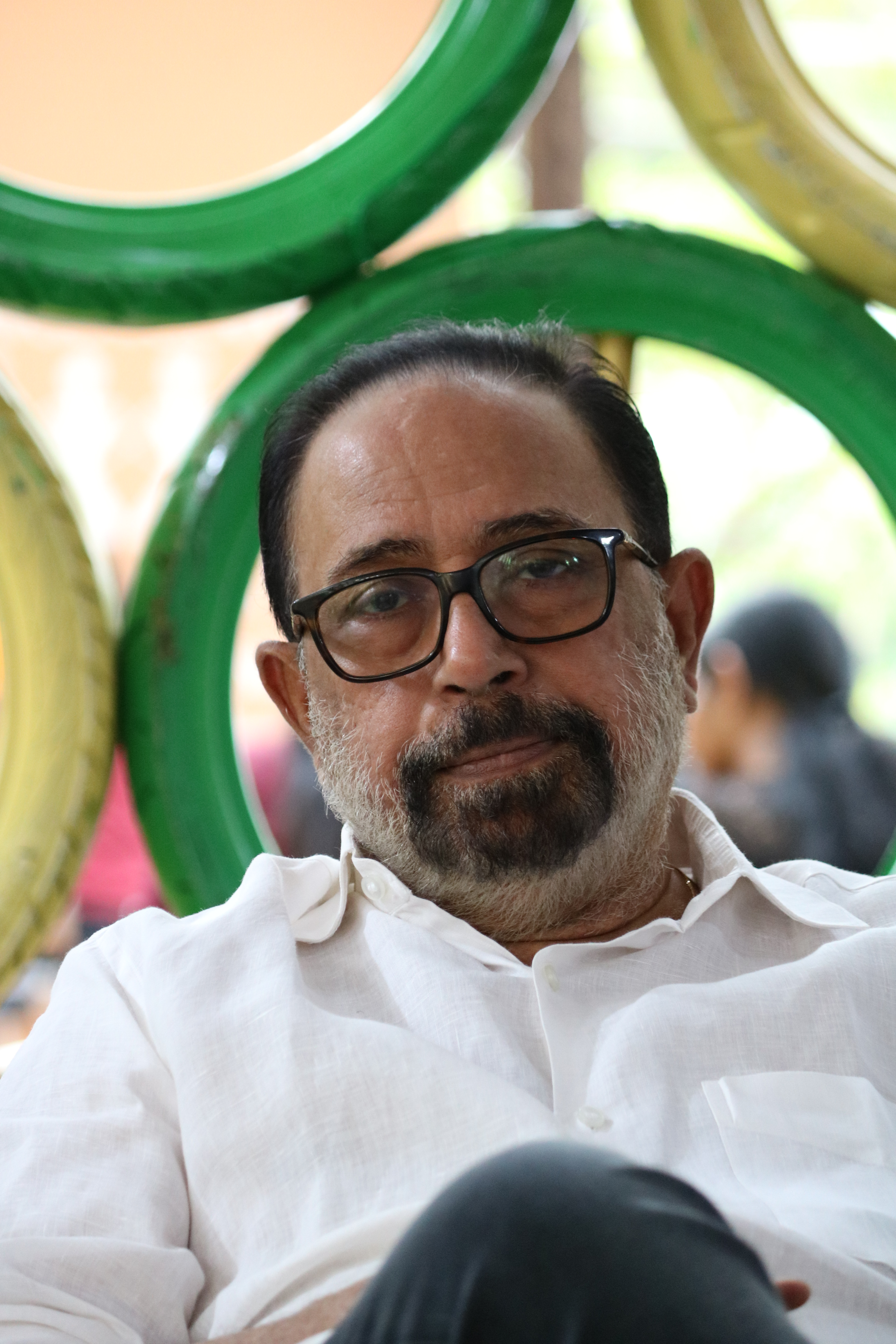
- Born: 2 May 1956 (age 70); Alappuzha, Travancore-Cochin, (present-day Kerala, India)
- Occupation: Film director
- Years active: 1985 – present
- Spouse: Bala
- Children: Joe, Zeba

Sibi Malayil (born 2 May 1956) is an Indian film director who works in Malayalam cinema.

== Career ==
Malayil studied at St. Berchmans College before entering the Malayalam film industry. Prior to making his directorial debut, he worked as an assistant director under Priyadarshan and Fazil.

His filmography includes Chekkeranoru Chilla (1986), Thaniyavarthanam (1987), Vicharana (1988), Kireedam (1989), Dasharatham (1989), His Highness Abdullah (1990), Malayogam (1990), Bharatham (1991), Sadayam (1992), Kamaladalam (1992), Akashadoothu (1993), Chenkol (1993), and Sagaram Sakshi (1994). Many of these films were written by A. K. Lohithadas. Bharatham earned Mohanlal his first National Film Award for Best Actor in a Leading Role.

Sibi Malayil has also served as president of the Film Employees Federation of Kerala (FEFKA) and as chairman of the NEO Film School in Kochi.

== Personal life ==
Sibi Malayil is married to Bala. They have a son Joe and a daughter Zeba.

== Filmography ==
As Associate Director

Year	Title	Director
1980	Manjil Virinja Pookkal	Fazil
1982	Padayottam	Jijo Punnoose
1984	Poochakkoru Mookkuthi	Priyadarsan
1984	Odaruthammava Aalariyam	Priyadarsan
1993	Manichitrathazhu	Fazil

As Chief Associate Director

Year	Title	Director
1983	Ente Mamattukkuttiyammakku	Fazil

As Director

Year	Title	Script Writer
1985	Mutharamkunnu P.O.	Sreenivasan
1986	Doore Doore Oru Koodu Koottam	Sreenivasan
1986	Chekkeranoru Chilla	Priyadarshan
1986	Rareeram	Perumbadavam Sreedharan
1987	Ezhuthapurangal	A. K. Lohithadas
1987	Thaniyavarthanam	A. K. Lohithadas
1988	Vicharana	A. K. Lohithadas
1988	August 1	S. N. Swamy
1989	Mudra	A. K. Lohithadas
1989	Kireedam	A. K. Lohithadas
1989	Dasharatham	A. K. Lohithadas
1990	His Highness Abdullah	A. K. Lohithadas
1990	Malayogam	A. K. Lohithadas
1990	Parampara	S. N. Swamy
1991	Dhanam	A. K. Lohithadas
1991	Bharatham	A. K. Lohithadas
1991	Santhwanam	J. Pallassery
1992	Sadayam	M. T. Vasudevan Nair
1992	Kamaladalam	A. K. Lohithadas
1992	Valayam	A. K. Lohithadas
1993	Akashadoothu	Dennis Joseph
1993	Maya Mayooram	Renjith
1993	Chenkol	A. K. Lohithadas
1994	Sagaram Sakshi	A. K. Lohithadas
1995	Aksharam	John Paul
1995	Sindoora Rekha	Raghunath Paleri
1996	Kaanaakkinaavu	T A Razzaq
1996	Kaliveedu	Sasidharan Arattuvazhi
1997	Nee Varuvolam	G A Lal
1998	Pranayavarnangal	Jayaraman Kadambat; Sachidanandan Puzhankara
1998	Summer in Bethlehem	Renjith
1999	Ustaad	Renjith
2000	Devadoothan	Raghunath Paleri
2001	Ishtam	Kalavoor Ravikumar
2003	Ente Veedu Appuvinteyum	Bobby Sanjay
2004	Jalolsavam	M. Sindhuraj
2004	Kisan	Sachidandan Puzhankara; Sathyan Kolangad
2004	Amrutham	K. Gireesh Kumar
2005	Alice in Wonderland	K. Gireesh Kumar
2007	Flash	Bhasurachandran
2009	Aayirathil Oruvan	T.A Razzaq
2010	Apoorvaragam	G.S Anand; Najeem Koya
2011	Violin	Viju Ramachandran
2012	Unnam	Swathy Bhaskar
2014	Njangalude Veettile Athidhikal	K. Gireesh Kumar
2015	Saigal Padukayaanu	T.A Razzaq
2022	Kotthu	Hemanth Kumar

== Awards ==
National Film Awards

- 1997 – Nargis Dutt Award for Best Feature Film on National Integration – Kanakkinavu
- 1994 – National Film Award for Best Film on Family Welfare – Aakasadoothu
- 1987 – National Film Award for Best Film on Other Social Issues – Doore Doore Koodu Koottam

Filmfare Awards South

- 1991 – Filmfare Award for Best Director - Malayalam – Bharatham
- 1992 – Filmfare Award for Best Director - Malayalam – Sadayam

Kerala State Film Awards

- 2003 – Best Director – Ente Veedu Appuvinteyum
- 2003 – Kerala State Film Award for Best film with popular appeal and aesthetic value – Ente Veedu Appuvinteyum
- 2000 – Kerala State Film Award for Best film with popular appeal and aesthetic value – Devadoothan
- 1996 – Second Best Film – Kanakkinavu
- 1991 – Second Best Film – Bharatham

== See also ==
- List of Malayalam films from 1981 to 1985
- List of Malayalam films from 1986 to 1990
- List of Malayalam films from 1991 to 1995
- List of Malayalam films from 1996 to 2000
