= L. Bhoominathan =

Indian film editor

- Born: Lakshmikanthan Bhoominathan
- Occupation: Film editor
- Years active: 1977–present

L. Bhoominathan is an Indian film editor who works in Malayalam cinema. He has been credited with editing 115 films to date. He has won the Kerala State Film Award for Best Editor three times. His most noteworthy works include Ninnishtam Ennishtam, His Highness Abdullah, Bharatham, Aaram Thamburan and Narashimham. He worked in most of the films of the directors Sibi Malayil, Shaji Kailas and Ranjith. He was one of the jury members of 50th Kerala State Film Awards.

== Awards ==
Kerala State Film Awards

- 1996 – Best Editor – Kaanaakkinaavu
- 1997 – Best Editor – Asuravamsam
- 2006 – Best Editor – Vaasthavam
