= B. Unnikrishnan =

Indian film director, screenwriter, film distributor, exhibitor and producer

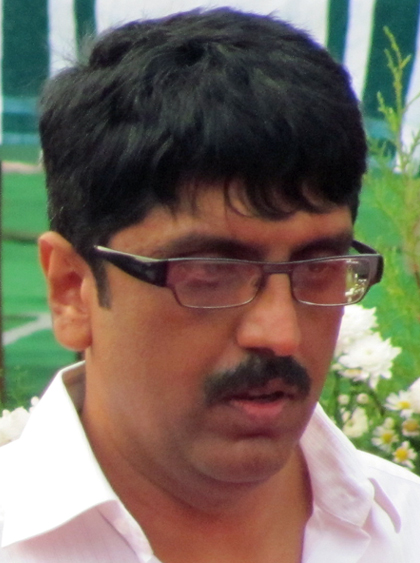
- Born: Unnikrishnan Bhaskaran Pillai; 14 August 1970 (age 56); Kollam, Kerala (present-day Pathanamthitta, Kerala, India)
- Occupations: Film director; screenwriter; producer/distributor; Exhibitor; writer
- Years active: 1999 – present
- Spouse: Rajeswari Menon
- Relatives: Mohanlal

Unnikrishnan Bhaskaran Pillai (born 14 August 1970), known mononymously as B. Unnikrishnan, is an Indian film director, screenwriter, distributor and exhibitor who works in the Malayalam film industry.

== Early life ==
Unnikrishnan was born on 14 August 1970 in Kollam, Kerala (present-day Pathanamthitta district in Kerala) to Bhaskaran Pillai and Ponnamma Bhaskaran Pillai. He married Rajeswari Menon, a professor.

== Career ==
He began his film career in 1999 by writing the screenplay of Jalamarmaram directed by T. K. Rajeev Kumar, which won the Kerala State Film Award for Best Screenplay that year. The film dealt with the politics of water and environmentalism. In 2000, his screenplay Cover Story directed by G. S. Vijayan was released. It was a box office failure. He was the screenwriter of the thriller Black and White, a television serial telecast in Asianet in 2004, which won two Kerala State Television Awards. The serial was directed by Viji Thampi. in 2004, he wrote and directed a telefilm titled Antharangal, which won the Kerala state television award for the best telefilm. In 2005, he wrote, produced and directed a telefilm, Annum Mazhayayirunnu which was aired by Amrita TV. The Hindu wrote "The suspense that is maintained throughout the short movie, despite it being set in a domestic, sylvan setting, goes to the credit of the carefully crafted script". The telefilm won six Kerala State Television Awards, including Best Telefilm and Best screenplay for B. Unnikrishnan.

He scripted Shaji Kailas-directorial action film Shivam in 2002 and the thriller film The Tiger in 2005, the latter starring Suresh Gopi was successful. He made his feature film directorial debut in 2006 with the action film Smart City. His second directorial Madampi starring Mohanlal was a blockbuster . Unlike his previous films, Madampi was a family drama that told the story of a money lender in a village. In 2009, he scripted and directed the action police story I. G. – Inspector General starring Suresh Gopi. The film talked issues like terrorism and communal politics. In the same year, he wrote and directed the segment Aviramam in the anthology film Kerala Cafe. In 2010, he scripted and directed the political satire Pramani starring Mammootty as a corrupt panchayat president, which was a box office failure. It was followed by the action film The Thriller, an investigative story starring Prithviraj Sukumaran as a cop.

His directorial crime thriller Grandmaster released in 2012 was written by himself starring Mohanlal as a loner IPS officer who is challenged to investigate a crime. Not only that it was a financial success, but it showed Mohanlal in a totally different look and style. Grandmaster was the first Malayalam film produced by UTV and it is also the first Malayalam film to be released in Netflix, apart from its theatrical release. It was followed by I Love Me, a romantic thriller written by Sethu, that revolves around a group of youngsters. In 2015, he wrote and directed the heist film Mr. Fraud, starring Mohanlal, which was a commercial failure.

B. Unnikrishnan forayed into production and distribution with his company, RD Illuminations, which acquired and released the Malayalam dubbed versions of Sarrainodu (2016), Fidaa (2017), DJ: Duvvada Jagannadham (2017), and Bhaagamathie (2018). He collaborated with Mohanlal, in 2017, for the crime thriller, Villain. With the film, he introduced Vishal into Malayalam cinema. It was also the first Indian film to be completely shot in 8K resolution. After that, he co-produced and distributed the action thriller, Swathandriam Ardharathriyil (2018). It was produced by B. C. Joshy, Lijo Jose Pellissery, and Chemban Vinod Jose. It was a huge success at the box-office. In 2019, he wrote and directed the first Malayalam film produced by Viacom18 Motion Pictures, Kodathi Samaksham Balan Vakeel.It was a commercial success. In 2022, he collaborated with Mohanlal, for the fifth time, with Neyyattinkara Gopante Aaraattu written by Udaykrishna. However, it was critically panned by both the critics and audience, alike and box-office failure. In 2023, he collaborated with Mammootty, for a second time with Christopher written by Udaykrishna, it received mixed to positive reviews from critics and audiences.

== Other work ==
B. Unnikrishnan was elected general secretary of Film Employees Federation of Kerala (FEFKA) in 2008, and was re-elected to the position three times—2010, 2013 and 2017. In 2014, he was elected as the general secretary of All India Film Employees Confederation (AIFEC).

He is a member in the advisory committee of Cine Workers' Welfare Board and director of Saamskaarika Kshemanidhi in Kerala. In 2016, he opened the multi-cuisine restaurant named Grandmaster's Kitchen in Palayam, Thiruvananthapuram, the restaurant was named after his film Grandmaster.

He owns the film distribution company RD Illuminations, that debuted in 2016 by releasing Yodhavu in Kerala. He was the managing director of the film post-production studio Vismayas Max and also the multiplex Aries Plex SL Cinemas, a Double 4K 64-channel Dolby Atmos theatre in Thiruvananthapuram. It is the first theatre with Double 4K facility in South India.

== Filmography ==
Year	Title	Credited as		Notes
Year	Title	Director	Writer	Notes
1999	Jalamarmaram	No	Yes	Director: T. K. Rajeev Kumar
2000	Cover Story	No	Yes	Director: G. S. Vijayan
2002	Shivam	No	Yes	Director: Shaji Kailas
2004	Jana	No	Yes	Director: Shaji Kailas; Tamil film debut
2005	The Tiger	No	Yes	Director: Shaji Kailas
2006	Smart City	Yes	Yes	
2008	Madampi	Yes	Yes	
2009	IG	Yes	Yes	
2009	Aviramam	Yes	Yes	Segment from Kerala Cafe
2010	Pramani	Yes	Yes	
2010	The Thriller	Yes	Yes	
2012	Grandmaster	Yes	Yes	
2012	I Love Me	Yes	No	Writer: Sethu
2014	Mr. Fraud	Yes	Yes	
2017	Villain	Yes	Yes	
2019	Kodathi Samaksham Balan Vakeel	Yes	Yes	
2022	Aaraattu	Yes	No	Writer: Udaykrishna
2023	Christopher	Yes	No	Writer: Udaykrishna
2026	Prathichaya	Yes	Yes	

List of television credits
Year	Title	Credit	Network	Notes
2004	Black and White	Writer	Asianet	Serial; director: Viji Thampi
2005	Annu Mazhayayirunnu	Director; Writer; Producer	Amrita TV	Telefilm

== Accolades ==
=== Kerala State Film Awards ===
- 1999: Best Screenplay – Jalamarmaram

=== Kerala State Television Awards ===
- 2003: Best telefilm – Antharangal
- 2005: Best Telefilm – Annum Mazhayayirunnu
- 2005: Best Screenplay – Annum Mazhayayirunnu
