= Devadasi (1999 film) =

1999 film Malayalam film by Biju Varkey

- Directed by: Biju Varkey
- Starring: Nishanth Sagar; Abitha; Nedumudi Venu; Bharath Gopi; M. R. Gopakumar; Vinduja Menon
- Music by: Sharreth
- Release date: 12 September 1999
- Country: India
- Language: Malayalam

Devadasi is a 1999 Indian Malayalam-language film, directed by Biju Varkey, starring Nishanth Sagar and Jeneesha. It was released on 12 September 1999.

== Cast ==
- Abitha as Maala
- Nishanth Sagar as Mahi
- Nedumudi Venu as Deva rao
- Bharath Gopi as Santha Ram
- M. R. Gopakumar as Krishnan

== Soundtrack ==
Sharreth has composed the original score and soundtracks for the movie.

Song title	Singers
"Divaaswapnam"	K. S. Chithra, P. Unnikrishnan
"Yamuna Nadiyozhukum"	K. S. Chithra, Sharreth
"Devee Hridayaraagam"	K. S. Chithra, P. Unnikrishnan
"Dil-E-Naadaan"	Srinivas
"Paaraalum Maalore"	Sharreth
"Sudhamanthram"	P. Unnikrishnan
"Chalal Chanchala"	K. J. Yesudas
"Pon Vasantham"	Vidhu Prathap
"Namasthesthu Mahamaaye"	G. Venugopal, Sharreth

== Release ==
The film garnered attention after the release of Sethu (1999), where Abitha played a leading role and was dubbed in Tamil as Deva. Her glamorous role in Devadasi subsequently lost the actress film offers.

Regarding the Tamil version, K. N. Vijiyan of New Straits Times wrote that "The second half is more interesting but is not enough to justify the price of the ticket. Perhaps the film is meant for those who are curious about Abitha's past efforts".
