= Latha Kurien Rajeev =

Indian film producer

- ലത കുര്യൻ രാജീവ്
- Born: 17 April 1964 (age 62); Trivandrum
- Occupations: Film Producer & Art Historian & Art Curator & Art Educator
- Years active: 1982–present
- Spouse: T. K. Rajeev Kumar
- Children: Mrinal Rajeev & Kirtana Rajeev

Latha Kurien Rajeev is an Indian film producer, and wife of film maker T.K. Rajeev Kumar. She has produced three Malayalam movies under their banner 'A Blue Mermaid Picture Company'. Latha also is an art curator, lecturer and owner of La Gallery 360, an art gallery in Trivandrum. She has a Masters in Art History from Stella Maris College, Chennai. She is currently based in Kerala.

Her maiden production, Jalamarmaram, directed by T.K. Rajeev Kumar is a compassionate tale told from a child's point of view, about disregarding the pollution of Kerala's pristine water lifelines. It won the National Award for Best Feature Film on Environment, and Best Child Actor, in 2000. In 1999, this film took home the Kerala State Film Awards for Second Best Feature Film, Best Editor for Sreekar Prasad and Best Screenplay. Her second production, Sesham, also directed by Kumar is an offbeat story about mental health and social insensitivity starring Jayaram. It won a number of awards including the Kerala State Award for Best Feature Film, Editing for Sreekar Prasad, Best Sound Recording, Best Story and a Special Jury Award for Jayaram, the lead actor. Her third production, a thriller set almost entirely in an apartment elevator, Up & Down - Mukalil Oralundu, directed by Kumar starring Indrajith Sukumaran and an ensemble cast, was released in 2013.

Her directorial debut was the Malayalam short film Cologne, scripted by Deepti Nair, in 2013. This was 'A Blue Mermaid Pictures Company's' first short. The film revolves around one woman's life changing experience that occur within the span of a single day.

She directed an experimental film titled Who Am I ( 2012) in Malayalam, scripted and performed by Praveen P Gopinath. It sets out to ask viewers poignant questions about spirituality in everyday life.
