= Vimala Menon =

Indian dance teacher (born 1943)

Kalamandalam Vimala Menon
- Born: 7 January 1943 (age 83); Irinjalakuda, Thrissur, Kerala, India
- Education: Kerala Kalamandalam, Cheruthuruthy (Diploma In Mohiniyattam & Bharathanatyam)
- Occupations: Director and Principal of Kerala Natya Academy, Classical Dance Instructor & Author
- Years active: 1964 – present
- Awards: Padma Shri (2026); Guinness Book of Records (2006); Sangeet Natak Akademi Award (2006); Kerala Kalamandalam Award (2005); Kerala Sangeetha Nataka Akademi Award (1991); Viswabharathy Award (1980); All Kerala Social Service Association Award (1964)
- Website: kalamanadalamvimalamenon.a4add.com

Vimala Menon, known popularly as Kalamandalam Vimala Menon (born 7 January 1943) is an Indian dance teacher and Mohiniyattam exponent from Kerala. She is the founder and Director of Kerala Natya Academy in Thiruvananthapuram.

== Early life and education ==
Vimala was born into an affluent family in a village in Irinjalakuda, Thrissur district. She is the second of seven children born to S. K. Krishnan Nair, a civil engineer, and Vishalakshy Amma. Vimala learned her initial dance lessons from Thripunithura Vijaya Bhanu. She also had her training in Carnatic music under M. R. Madhusudhana Menon. After completing her school education, she joined Kerala Kalamandalam for a four-year diploma course in dance in 1960. At Kalamandalam, she had training in Mohiniyattam under the tutelage of Thottassery Chinnammu Amma and Kalamandalam Satyabhama. She also studied Bharata Natyam under Thanjavoor Bhaskara Rao.

While working as a dance teacher in the Jawahar School at Neyveli Lignite Corporation, she married Viswanatha Menon. After the marriage in 1966, she accompanied her husband to live in Bhutan where he was an officer with Bhutan government. She has a son, Vinod and a daughter Vinduja Menon who acted in several Malayalam films, including Pavithram and Njan Gandharvan.

During her stay in Bhutan, Vimala taught dance in the Bhutan Government School and performed South Indian Classical dance in many places.

== Awards and honours ==
During her long career, Vimala Menon won several awards and honours, including the Kerala Sangeetha Nataka Akademi Award in 1991 and the Kendra Sangeeta Nataka Akademi Award in 2006.In 2026, she was conferred with the Padma Shri, India's fourth-highest civilian award, for her distinguished service to the arts. She received the All Kerala Social Service Association Award for Bharata Natyam in 1972. She won the Senior Fellowship Award for her research work in "Ramanattom in Mohiniyattom" by the Government of India's Cultural Department in 2004. Vimala also received the Kerala Kalamandalam Award for Dance from Kerala Kalamandalam for her contribution to South Indian Classical Dances. In 2014, she received the Kerala Sangeetha Nataka Akademi Fellowship.
