= Ottayal Pattalam =

- Directed by: T. K. Rajeev Kumar
- Written by: T. K. Rajeev Kumar; Kalavoor Ravikumar
- Starring: Mukesh; Innocent; Madhoo
- Cinematography: Sunny Joseph
- Edited by: Venugopal
- Music by: Sharreth
- Distributed by: Century Films
- Release date: 1991
- Running time: 133 min
- Country: India
- Language: Malayalam

Ottayal Pattalam (transl. One man army) is a 1991 Indian Malayalam-language caper comedy film written and directed by T. K. Rajeev Kumar. The film stars Mukesh and Madhoo, with Innocent and K. P. A. C. Lalitha in supporting roles. Sharreth scored the music for the film.

== Plot ==
Gopika Varma is an NRI who is returning to India to perform death rituals for her parents, who were killed during an theft attempt by Antony, a man of African origin. Anthony follows her to India and tries to kidnap her. At the same time, a gang from India is trying to kidnap her with the objective of stealing her possessions at airport. Due to their car breaking down, they take the taxi driven by Venu. Venu, an orphan raised by nuns, has started his first day as a driver. Due to a string of events, Gopika mistakes Venu for the gang leader. and she takes his car and escapes. Venu takes her parents' ashes, which she brought for the rituals.

Venu is framed for kidnapping Gopika as a of a police plan, and Gopika is renamed Indhu and relocated with protection. Meanwhile, Antony and the gang join as allies. Venu is on the run from the police and the gang, and escapes from their clutches many times. Venu tries to give the ashes to India and make her know the truth, using his friend Velayudhan, but he is arrested by the police. Venu escapes, accidentally joins a drama company while on the run, and mistakenly applies an old man's makeup, which helps him to avoid the police and gangs. He takes as a fake identity that of a Colonel Nair, an ex-military officer, and goes to Gopika's current residence.

Venu, as Colonel Nair, becomes close to Gopika and tries to convince her of Venu's innocence. Venu saves her from the gang and returns the ashes through his friend Velayudhan. Gopika is lovestruck and believes Venu is innocent. At her residence, Antony attacks her, and Venu captures him. Gopika is admitted to the hospital, where a nun is also admitted. During an attempt to see her Gopika realises Colonel Nair's real identity and tries to joke with him.

Gopika and Venu goes to DIG Chandrashekar and tell him truth, but Venu is captured instead and becomes agitated towards Gopika. He and Velayudhan escape and kidnap Gopika, and exchange her for money from the Gang. But the police are informed, and she is saved by Venu in Colonel Nair's costume. She fakes to attempt suicide by jumping in a lake to joke around with Venu, who, in an attempt to save her, jumps in and losses his makeup, revealing that he is Venu which Gopika has already known for a long time. The movie ends showing the Colonel Nair costume in the water, police thinking that a good man was killed, and Venu and Gopika laughing

== Cast ==
- Mukesh as Venu Gopalakrishnan/Col. R. K. Nair
- Madhoo as Gopika Varma/Indu
- Innocent as DIG Chandrashekara Menon
- KPAC Lalitha as SI Shoshamma
- Shammi Thilakan
- Antony (Kenyan) as Simon Antony
- Paravoor Bharathan as SI Bharghavan
- Vettukili Prakash as Velayudhan
- Edavela Babu
- Kalpana
- Bobby Kottarakkara as Makeup man
- Preethika
- Ranju
- Ravi Vallathol
- Asha Jayaram
- James
- Manimala as Matron

== Soundtrack ==
Ottayal Pattalam

Soundtrack album by Sharreth
- Genre: Feature film soundtrack
- Language: Malayalam

Sharreth chronology
Kshanakkathu (1990)	Ottayal Pattalam (1991)	Rudraksham (1992)

The film has two songs composed by Sharreth while the lyrics were written by P. K. Gopi. The song "Mayamanchalil" is an Evergreen song. The background score of the movie was by Johnson.

Track	Singer(s)	Lyrics
"Mayamanchalil Ithu"	Radhika Thilak, G. Venugopal	P. K. Gopi
"Thinthaktho"	G. Venugopal	P. K. Gopi
