= Pavithram (1994 film) =

- Theatrical release poster
- Directed by: T. K. Rajeev Kumar
- Screenplay by: P. Balachandran
- Story by: P. Balachandran; T. K. Rajeev Kumar
- Produced by: Thankachan
- Starring: Mohanlal; Shobana; Thilakan; Srividya; Sreenivasan; Nedumudi Venu; Innocent
- Cinematography: Santosh Sivan
- Edited by: V Venugopal
- Music by: Sharreth
- Production company: Vishudhi Films
- Distributed by: Jubilee Pictures
- Release date: 4 February 1994
- Running time: 160 minutes
- Country: India
- Language: Malayalam

Pavithram (transl. Sacred) is a 1994 Indian Malayalam-language drama film directed by T. K. Rajeev Kumar and written by P. Balachandran from a story by Balachandran and T. K. Rajeev Kumar. The film stars Mohanlal and Shobana in lead roles. Vinduja Menon, Thilakan, Srividya, K. P. A. C. Lalitha, Sreenivasan, Nedumudi Venu and Innocent played prominent supporting roles. The music for the film was composed by Sharreth and the cinematography was by Santosh Sivan. The movie was edited by V Venugopal.

The film deals with the relationship between siblings Unnikrishnan (Mohanlal) and Meenakshi (Vinduja Menon) who have an almost 30 year age difference between them. The film won Mohanlal the Filmfare Award for Best Actor – Malayalam.

== Plot ==
The movie begins with an older man's dream; Unnikrishnan is roused from his house and told to come in haste to see his father (someone Unni has long believed to be dead). He is greeted by a crowd of people who begin to make fun of him and Unni wakes up. An astrologer interprets the dream as a harbinger of Easwara Pillai's death and advises Unni to do the last rites for his "dead" father. During the rituals, Unni comes to find it difficult to go through with the rituals as he then believes that his father is alive; he walks away declaring that his father is not dead.

The story flashes back to Unni's youth when he was living in his ancestral home with his parents, Easwara Pillai and Devakiyamma. He is courting Meera, a beautiful woman with a penchant for books and stories. Unni and Meera appear all set to be married and Meera's father wants Unni to take an MBA in England and eventually take over the reins of the company. Unni makes it clear that he has no interest in pursuing such a career and his dreams are very simple.

Unni has a brother Ramakrishnan who is a doctor living in the city with his wife. Devakiyamma wants to have a grandchild and she is concerned as Ramakrishnan has been married a few years without children. In her desire to become a grandmother she visits many temples and holy functions to pray for a grandchild. In a twist of fate, Devakiyamma becomes pregnant. She and her husband Easwara Pillai are ashamed at the first signs of the pregnancy and worry how their grown children will react to this news. But they are surprised by the enthusiasm of Unni and the mature and supportive attitude of Ramakrishnan.

Devakiyamma gives birth to a girl but dies during childbirth. Ramakrishnan's wife does not seem to be interested in children much less in one she considers being a source of shame. In the absence of anyone to take care of the child, Unni steps in to foster the child, who is named Meenakshi. Soon after in a heated moment, Unni scolds his father and Easwara Pillai leaves town as he is devastated by the recent happenings. This leaves Unni with the double responsibility of being a brother as well as father to Meenakshi. Unni breaks off his relationship with Meera upon Meera's father's request as he feels the child will always be a source for problems in their relationship. Unni goes ahead with it as he feels Meenakshi needs him and there's no one else to take that role.

The story then comes back to the present as Meenakshi is a grown girl preparing for her 10th-grade exams. Unni has regressed to village life after he chose to play Meenakshi's brother-father. Over the years Unni has become possessive of Meenakshi as she has been the centre of his existence. When it comes time for Meenakshi to go to the city and stay in a hostel to continue her studies, Unni goes through a trying period before finally coming to terms with the inevitable. In the city, Meenakshi is exposed to a new culture and fashions that she was not aware of when growing up in the village and she becomes enamoured in it.

Meenakshi becomes involved in the city lifestyle, even meeting with Ramakrishnan's wife, who was surprised to see her grow up and adapted to the city culture and fashion. Ramakrishnan's wife is also involved in changing Meenakshi into a complete modern girl by sending her to competitions and beauty pageants. This causes friction between her and Unni leading to fights and hostile encounters when they meet. Meenakshi moves to the city and Unni follows her to apologize but sees her involved in an accident, the cause for which has his small role.

Meenakshi survives the accident and Ramakrishnan chastises her for ignoring Unni who gave up his dreams for her. Meenakshi repents and goes back to the village to meet with Unni where she realizes that he has become mentally unbalanced after the trauma of seeing her in the accident and she decides to spend the rest of her life taking care of him.

== Cast ==
- Mohanlal as Unnikrishnan/Chettachan
- Shobana as Meera, Unnikrishnan’s love interest
- Vinduja Menon as Meenakshi, Unnikrishnan and Ramakrishnan’s younger sister
- Thara Thomas Moolayil as child Meenakshi
- K. P. A. C. Lalitha as Punchiri
- Innocent as Erussery
- Thilakan as Easwara Pillai, Unnikrishnan, Ramakrishnan and Meenakshi’s father
- Srividya as Devakiyamma, Unnikrishnan, Ramakrishnan and Meenakshi’s mother
- Sreenivasan as Dr. Ramakrishnan, Unnikrishnan and Meenakshi’s elder brother
- Narendra Prasad as Sankaran Pillai, Meera’s father
- Nedumudi Venu as Warrier, close friend of Easwara Pillai
- Santhakumari, Warrier’s wife
- Renuka as Nirmala, Dr. Ramakrishnan's wife
- Rudra as Meenakshi’s college friend
- Sudheesh as Sivankutty, Meenakshi’s childhood friend and Punchiri’s son
- Seethal as Meenakshi, Child artist

== Music ==
Pavithram

Soundtrack album by Sharreth
- Released: 1993
- Recorded: 1993
- Studios: Tharangini, Chennai
- Genre: Film soundtrack
- Labels: Magnasound; Sony Music
- Producer: Vishudhi Films

Sharreth chronology
Ottayal Pattalam (1991)	Pavithram (1993)	Sagaram Sakshi (1994)

The film has six songs composed by Sharreth, with lyrics by O. N. V. Kurup. The song "Sreeragamo" skyrocketed to fame upon release and is highly regarded as a masterpiece of the composer. It is composed on Carnatic raga Kharaharapriya. Sharath uses Dwijavanti raga in the noted song "Thaalamayanju", sung by Yesudas and Sujatha.

Track	Song	Singer(s)	Raaga
1	"Sreeragamo"	K. J. Yesudas, Sujatha (chorus)	Kharaharapriya
2	"Thaalamayanju"	K. J. Yesudas, Sujatha	Dwijavanti, Madhyamavati
3	"Vaalinmel Poovum"	M. G. Sreekumar, Sujatha	Kalyani
4	"Parayoo Nin Hamsa"	K. S. Chithra, Srinivas	Shubhapantuvarali
5	"Kannil Pedamaaninte"	G. Venugopal, Sujatha	
6	"Parayoo Nin Hamsa"	K. J. Yesudas	Shubhapantuvarali

== Accolades ==
- Filmfare Award for Best Actor – Malayalam - Mohanlal
- Kerala Film Critics Association Awards for Best Music Director - Sharreth

== Adaptations ==
Reportedly, Pavithram was the main source of inspiration for the 2018 Bollywood film Badhaai Ho. In 2019, it was reported that producers of Pavithram are planning to remake the film in Tamil and Telugu.
