= Pookkalam Varavayi =

- Directed by: Kamal
- Screenplay by: Ranjith
- Story by: P. R. Nathan
- Produced by: Kannan
- Starring: Jayaram; Sunitha; Shamili; Rekha Haris; Murali; Geetha
- Cinematography: Jayanan Vincent
- Edited by: K. Rajagopal
- Music by: Ouseppachan
- Release date: April 1991
- Country: India
- Language: Malayalam

Pookkalam Varavayi (transl. Spring is coming) is a 1991 Indian Malayalam-language comedy-drama film directed by Kamal and written by Ranjith from a story by P. R. Nathan. It stars Jayaram, Sunitha, Shamili, Murali, and Geetha. Divya Unni and Kavya Madhavan made their debuts in the film as child artists. The plot revolves around the friendship between a school bus driver, Nandan, and a little girl, Geethu.

== Plot ==
Five-year-old Geethu's parents got divorced. She now stays four days a week with her mom and three days with her dad as per the court's order. She becomes friendly with Nandan, the driver of her school bus.

During her Christmas vacation, Geethu decides to go to Nandan's village without informing her parents. Nandan's sister had recently lost her daughter, who was the same age as Geethu when she drowned in the village river. Geethu wins the hearts of everyone in the village and becomes the center of attention there. Meanwhile, her parents are worried about their missing child and are searching for her everywhere.

Finally, they learn where Geethu is and come to the village to retrieve her. Geethu also falls into the river — the same way Nandan's niece drowned — but is rescued by Nandan. The tension and anxiety unite her parents and they decide to live together again.

== Cast ==
- Baby Shamili as Geethu
- Jayaram as Nandan, a school bus driver
- Murali as Jayaraj, Geethu's father
- Geetha as Usha, Geethu's mother
- Sunitha as Thulasi, Nandan's love interest
- Innocent as Pothuval
- Jagathy Sreekumar as Cherukunnathu Bhaskara Pillai
- Rekha as Nirmala, Nandan's sister
- Thikkurissy Sukumaran Nair as Muthachan
- Kaviyoor Ponnamma as Nandan's Mother
- Philomina as Akkamma
- Sankaradi as The Priest
- Kalpana as the Tuition Teacher
- Meena as Bhaskara Pillai and Jayaraj's Sister
- Kuthiravattam Pappu as Mariyappan
- Paravoor Bharathan as Bus Driver
- Kavya Madhavan as First School Girl
- Divya Unni as Second School Girl
- Baby Charishma as Third School Girl

== Soundtrack ==
All music is composed by Ouseppachan.

No.	Title	Lyrics	Artist(s)	Length
1.	"Muthani Munthiri Mani Nirayum"	Bichu Thirumala	M. G. Sreekumar, Philomina, Choir
2.	"Etho Vaarmukilin" (Male)	Kaithapram Damodaran	G. Venugopal
3.	"Etho Vaarmukilin" (Female)	Kaithapram Damodaran	K. S. Chithra
4.	"Ambari Poonkuda Choodi"	Sasi Chittanjoor	K. S. Chithra
5.	"Kunu Kunungi Puzhayum"	Bichu Thirumala	M. G. Sreekumar
