= P. R. Nathan =

Indian writer (born 1946)

- Born: Payyanat Ravindra Nathan; 17 June 1946 (age 80); Kizhayoor, Pattambi, Palakkad, India
- Occupations: Writer, novelist, travelogue writer, dramatist, screenwriter, orator, philosopher, actor
- Spouse: Vijayalakshmi
- Writing career
- Genres: Novel, short story, drama, philosophy

Payyanat Ravindra Nathan, better known by his pen name P. R. Nathan, is a novelist, screenplay writer, dramatist, short story writer, travelogue writer and speaker from Palakkad, Kerala, India. He was awarded with the prestigious Kerala Sahitya Akademi Award for overall contribution in 2014. He has written more than 55 books in various genres. He is the recipient of 41 major awards across various categories in literature. He is an expert in Naturopathy and Reiki. He has given more than 7000 speeches around the world on Vedas, Upanishads and Tantra. His book Vaayikenda oru Pusthakam was selected for the Sri Padmanabha Swamy Bala Sahithya Award instituted by the Gramam Samskarika Vedi.

He was born in Kizhayoor, a small village in Pattambi, Palakkad. He was born as the elder son of Prabhakara Menon, a drawing teacher and Sarojiniamma, a music teacher. He took graduation in telecommunication Engineering and was employed in Provident Fund organisation of India. He resigned from the office to concentrate on his literature works and travelling. He was a member of the academy of music dance and drama and has been a member of many award juries.

His literature works was prescribed in many universities. He has written around hundred radio dramas also. His book Kanyakumari Muthal Himalayam Vare, so far his most famous work is written based on his travels to various parts of India. The book received huge critical acclaim. He has been delivering daily lectures on moral science using anecdotes on Amrita TV on the TV shows Dhanyamee Dinam on Udayamritham segment from 2004. This programme has been aired daily since Amrita TV's inception and it has been bestowed with multiple State TV Awards for excellence. In 2015, Media One TV, an Indian television channel broadcasting in Malayalam, operated by Madhyamam Broadcasting Limited, started broadcasting a similar show. He has written 21 novels, more than 500 short stories, screenplays, dramas. He has received 41 awards in various fields of literature. His works implies the philosophical view of practical life. He is famous for his philosophical works which at the same time satisfies the rationalist thoughts. He had served as the president of Calicut Book Club. He is also the editor of Pradeepam magazine, which is being published from Kozhikode. He now resides at Kozhikode with wife Vijayalakshmi.

He received the Tagore Award in 1980 and the Gayathri Award in 1995.

== Films ==
- Chaatta (1981) (story, screenplay)
- Dhwani (1988) (writer)
- Shubhayathra (1990) (story)
- Keli (1991) (dialogue)
- Pookkalam Varavayi (1991) (story)
- Snehasindooram (1997) (story)

== Novels ==
- Chaatta
- Kaashi
- Ottamaina
- Karimarunnu
- Innale Vanna Vazhi
- Nananja Pakshi
- Kooda
- Ini Oru Moham Matram
- Swapnangal Vilkunnu Kachavadakkaran
- Shayanapradakshinam
- Pavitrakettu
- Kudajadrisaanukkaliloode
- Soundaryalahari
- Chandanakaavu
- Monsoon
- Pashchimaghattam
- Maadambi
- Dhwani
- Pookkalam Varavayi
- Scooter
- Ishtadhaanam

== Short stories ==
- Kali Ganga
- Koothupaavakal
- Mahamaaya
- Kannadikoodu
- Anguleeyam
- Gangaprasadinte kuthira
- Alakananda
- Ottakal Mookuthi
- Prakaasikunna Kathakal
- Nanmakal Cheyamaayirunnu
- Etra Sundarajeevitham
- Saranya

== Philosophy ==
- Vaayikenda oru Pusthakam
- Dhanyamee Dhinam
- Amrutha Kathakal
- Gunappada Kathakal
- Udayamritha Chinthakal
- Sandesa Kathakal
- Vijayamantra
- Chirikkanoru Jeevitham
- Kathaparayum Gurunathan
- Odiyanum Manthravvadiyum
- Elassum Thakidum thodukurishastravum
- Jeevitha Vijaya Kathaamrutham
- Darsaneeka kathakal

== Travelogues ==
- Kanyakumari Muthal Himalayam Vare
- Himalaya Yatra

== Dramas ==
- Kalikaala Vaibhavam
- Shanthivanam

== Television ==
- Scooter
- Seemantham
- Elathaalam
- Gnanoodayam
- Varshamayooram
- Anandabhairavi
- Shanthivanam
- Onnam Classile Mashu
- Angaadipaattu
- Pakalveedu

== Awards ==
- Kerala Sahitya Akademi Award for Overall Contributions
- Kerala Sahitya Akademi Award
- Delhi Sahitya Parishad Award
- Vidyabhooshanam Award
- Tagore Award
- Pottekat Award
- Padmanabhaswami Award
- Kunchan Nambiar Award
- Vivekananda Award
- Aksharakalari Award
- Nila Award
- Gayathri Award
- Thoolika Award
- Thirakatha Award
- Nana Award
- M.T.V Award
- Film City Award
- Grihalakshmi Award
- Kalakeralam Award
- Television Vaignanika Paripadi Award
- Roselin Award
- Lions Club International Award
- Ala award
- Best Travelogue Award
- Kashyapa Veda Award
- Saraswathi Puraskar
- Gandhigram Award
- Chalachithra Sahrudaya Award
- Kalanidhi Award
- Bashir Award
- Sanathana Dharma Parishath Award
- Ofka Award
- Dhaarmikatha Award
- Sukumar Azhikode Award
- Agnaka Award
- Channel Prabhashanam Award
- Valluvanad Sahitya Award
- Mythri Forum Award
- Jyothish Trust Award
- Kshetra Jyothi Award
- Thapasya Keerthi Award
- Aananda Dhaamam Award
- Kashyapa Veda Award
