= Shubhayathra =

1990 Indian romantic drama film directed by Kamal

- Poster
- Directed by: Kamal
- Written by: P. R. Nathan
- Produced by: Raju Mathew
- Starring: Jayaram; Parvathy; Innocent; K. P. A. C. Lalitha; Mamukkoya; Jagadeesh
- Cinematography: Saloo George
- Edited by: K. Rajagopal
- Music by: Johnson
- Production company: Castle Productions
- Distributed by: Century Release
- Release date: August 30, 1990
- Running time: 120 minutes
- Country: India
- Language: Malayalam

Shubhayathra (transl. Happy journey) is a 1990 Indian Malayalam-language romantic drama film directed by Kamal and written by P. R. Nathan. Starring Jayaram and Parvathy in the lead roles, and Innocent, K. P. A. C. Lalitha, Mamukkoya, and Jagadeesh in other pivotal roles, the film examines the life of middle-class Malayalee families in the city of Mumbai.

== Plot ==
Vishnu and Arundhathi, working in Mumbai, meet each other at their common friend, Raman's house. They fall in love at first sight and get married. The film is their struggle to lead a family life and to find an accommodation in a city like Mumbai.

== Cast ==
- Jayaram as Vishnu
- Parvathy as Arundhathi
- Innocent as Raman, aka Ramettan
- KPAC Lalitha as Latha, Raman's Wife
- Mamukkoya as Kareem Bhai
- Jagadeesh as Rajendran
- Siddique as Sudhakaran, Vishnu's Friend
- Sukumari as Nancy, Hostel warden
- Oduvil Unnikrishnan as Thirumulpadu, tea vendor
- Paravoor Bharathan as Balachandran, Vishnu's father
- Zainuddin as Mohan, Vishnu's Friend
- Priyadharshini as Raman's daughter
- Dhivyadharshini as Raman's daughter
- Dan Dhanoa as Sher Khan
- Mansoor Ali Khan as Henchman of Kareem Bhai

== Production ==
Jayaram and Parvathy met on the set of this film before getting married in 1992.

== Reception ==
Sukumari plays the role of a "Mumbai widow who would regale everyone with tales of her deceased husband", a character noted for being Anglo-Indian.

== Soundtrack ==
The film's music was composed by Johnson with lyrics by P. K. Gopi. The soundtrack album features five songs.

1. "Kinaavinte Koodin" — G. Venugopal
2. "Kinaavinte Koodin" — K. S. Chithra
3. "Mizhiyilenthe" — G. Venugopal & K. S. Chithra
4. "Sindooram Thookum" — Unni Menon & Sujatha
