= Vinduja Menon =

Indian actress and dancer

- Born: Thiruvananthapuram, Kerala, India
- Education: Government College for Women, Thiruvananthapuram
- Occupations: Actress; playback singer; voice artist; dancer; teacher; Host
- Years active: 1985 – present
- Spouse: Rajesh Kumar
- Children: Neha Rajesh Nambiar
- Parent(s): K. P. Vishwanathan Menon; Vimala Menon

Vinduja Menon is an Indian actress known for her work in Malayalam cinema. Her most popular role is the one from the 1994 film Pavithram. She played as Mohanlal's sister in that movie. She took formal classical dance lessons from her mother and at present made her career as a dance teacher.

== Background ==
Vinduja made her movie debut as a child in the movie, Onnanam Kunnil Oradi Kunnil, released in 1985. She is a former Kalathilakam from Kerala School Kalolsavam in 1991, and the first artiste from Thiruvananthapuram to receive this honor. She studied at NSS College for Women in Karamana and did masters in Government College for Women, Thiruvananthapuram. She is conferred doctorate from Madurai Kamaraj University. She started her career as a drama artist.

== Personal life ==
Her father is K.P. Vishwanathan Menon, a Government officer, and her mother is Kalamandalam Vimala Menon, founder of Kerala Natya Academy, a prestigious dance institution. She has a brother, Vinod Kumar. She is married to Rajesh Kumar and has a daughter, Neha. She lives in Malaysia with her family and teaches dance under Kerala Natya Academy and occasionally acts in serials. She has also been a judge on the reality show "Dance Party" on Kairali TV.

== Filmography ==
Year	Title	Role	Notes
1985	Onnanam Kunnil Oradi Kunnil	Anand's sister	
1987	Nombarathi Poovu	Shanthi	
1991	Njan Gandharvan	Bhama's sister	
1994	Bheeshmaachaarya	Maya	
1994	Pingami	Ganga / Mary / Chinnumol	
1994	Pavithram	Meenakshi	
1994	Vendor Daniel State Licency	Rajalakshmi	
1995	Samudaayam	Suhara	
1995	Tom & Jerry	Nandini	
1995	Sreeraagam	Rugmini	
1995	Puthukkottayile Puthumanavalan	Anitha	
1995	Perariyapookkal	Radhika	
1995	Oru Panchathanthram Katha		
1996	Aayiram Naavulla Ananthan	Geetha	
1996	Kanchanam	Anu	
1996	Swantham Makalkku Snehapoorvam		
1997	Moonu Kodiyum Munnooru Pavanum	Sreedevi	
1997	Killikurushiyile Kudumba Mela	Maya	
1997	Snehasindooram	Ujwala	
1997	Superman	Hareendran's sister	
1999	Devadasi		
2016	Action Hero Biju	Hari's wife	

== Playback singing ==
- Kaavum Kovilakavum ... Aabharanachaarthu 2002
- Kamalappoovu Neeyalle ... Raajamudra (dubbed film) 2008

== Television ==
- All programs are serials, unless otherwise noted.

Year	Serials	Role	Channel	Notes
1998-2000	Sthree	Sunitha	Asianet	Television debut
2000-2002	Jwalayayi	Nandini	Doordarshan	
2003	Ishttamai		Asianet	
2004	Sneham		Asianet	
2007	Sassneham	Tara	Amrita TV	
	Sarigama	Host	Asianet	
2008	Munch star singer Junior	Celebrity Judge	Asianet	Reality show
2009	Neelambari	Host	Jaihind TV	talk show
2010	My Favourites	Herself	ACV	talk show
2012	Kathayariyathe	Thresia	Surya TV	
2012	Rudhraveena	Ambika/Ambalika	Surya TV	
2012	Devimahathmyam		Asianet	
2012	Radhamadhavam	Radha		
2012	Ramayanam	Sabari	Mazhavil Manorama	
2012	Thiranottam	Herself	ACV	talk show
2013	Swathi Mahothsavam 2013	Dancer	M7 News	
2014	Dance Party	Judge	Kairali TV	Reality show
2015	Vivahitha	Shalini	Mazhavil Manorama	
2015	Sakalakalolsavam	Herself	Manorama News	
2015	Thani Nadan	Presenter	Mazhavil Manorama	
2016	Comedy Super Nite	Herself	Flowers TV	Comedy show
2017	Malayali Veetamma	Judge	Flowers TV	Reality show
2017	Annie's Kitchen	Herself	Amrita TV	Cookery show
2017	Tharapakittu	Herself	Kaumudy TV	Cookery show
2018	Narthaki	Herself	Mangalam TV	talk show
2019	Varthaprabhatham	Herself	Asianet News	
2019	Annu Njan	Herself	Asianet News	
2021	Tharapakittu	Herself	Kaumudy TV	talk show
2021	Red Carpet	Mentor	Amrita TV	
