= Cover Story (2000 film) =

- Directed by: G. S. Vijayan
- Written by: B. Unnikrishnan
- Produced by: Menaka
- Starring: Suresh Gopi; Biju Menon; Tabu; Nedumudi Venu
- Cinematography: Venugopal
- Edited by: A. Sreekar Prasad
- Music by: Sharreth
- Production company: Revathy Kalamandhir
- Distributed by: CC Cine Vision
- Release date: 3 November 2000
- Running time: 131 minutes
- Country: India
- Language: Malayalam

Cover Story is a 2000 Indian Malayalam-language revenge action thriller film directed by G. S. Vijayan, written by B. Unnikrishnan and produced by Menaka under the production banner Revathy Kalamandhir. Starring Suresh Gopi, Biju Menon, Tabu and Siddique. The film has soundtrack composed by Sharreth.

== Plot ==
Jasmine Khan is a computer engineer, who wears contact lens due to vision problems. She is very friendly with her next-door neighbour Chandrashekar Menon, a retired judge with a haunted past. Jasmine meets Vijay, a news reporter and the executive director of True Vision who is on a mission to eliminate corruption through Media Channel. During a Christmas night, Menon is killed by a mysterious man, who is seen but not recognized by Jasmine, as she was not wearing contact lenses at that time.

Vijay's close friend and college mate ACP Anand suspects Jasmine in Menon's murder as retired DGP R.V. Thampuran was also killed in her presence in a shopping mall, but is unable to prove due to Vijay's interference and lack of evidence. The investigation for the true killer begins as Anand tries to find the real killer. Soon, Jasmine indetnifies the killer as Vijay. What are Vijay's true motives behind the killings form the rest of the plot.

== Cast ==
- Suresh Gopi as Vijay Madhavan
  - Aswin Thampi as Young Vijay
- Tabu as Jasmine Khan
- Biju Menon as ACP Anand S.Nair IPS, Vijay's friend
- Nedumudi Venu as Retd. Justice Chandrashekara Menon
- Siddique as Minister Isaac Thomas
- N. F. Varghese as Madhavan, Vijay's father
- Augustine as CI Sivaraman
- T. P. Madhavan as Retired Head Constable Chandran Nair
- Rizabawa as Retired DGP R.V. Thampuran IPS
- Anu Anand as True Vision Reporter Freddy
- P. Sreekumar as Businessman Sachidanandan
- Meghanathan as SI John Varghese
- Shalu Menon as True Vision Reporter Meera
- Ponnamma Babu as Advocate Seethalakshmi, Jasmine's advocate
- Yamuna as Sreedevi, Vijay's mother
- Joemon Joshy as Chandrashekara Menon's grandson

== Soundtrack ==
The film's soundtrack contains 4 songs, all composed by Sharreth. with lyrics by Gireesh Puthenchery.

No.	Title	Singer(s)
1	"Ini Maananathum" (F)	K. S. Chitra, Sharreth
2	"Ini Maananathum" (M)	M. G. Sreekumar, Sharreth
3	"Manjilpookkum"	K. S. Chitra, Sreenivas
4	"Yaamangal"	K. S. Chitra, M. G. Sreekumar

== Reception ==
A critic from indiainfo.com wrote that "If you are looking for fiery speeches, action packed fights, innovative camera angles or great music then you can give this film a skip". A critic from Sify wrote that "Despite good performances by most of the artists, the plot or rather the treatment seems to be rather unconvincing". The film ended up as a box-office disaster.
