= Kanchanam =

Kanchanam!
- Directed by: TN Vasanth Kumar
- Release date: 1996
- Country: India
- Language: Malayalam

Kanchanam is a 1996 Indian Malayalam film directed by TN Vasanth Kumar and starring Manoj K Jayan and Srividya in the lead roles.

== Cast ==
- Srividya as Arundhathi Devi
- Manoj K Jayan as James Antony
- Thilakan as Jose
- Madhupal as Siddhu
- Prathapachandran as Adv Swami
- Harishree Ashokan as Easho
- Jose Pallissery as Pattar
- NF Varghese as Prof Ravi
- Narendra Prasad as Billiards Menon
- Vinduja Menon as Anu
- Usharani as Muthassi
- Mafia Sasi as Minister's driver
- Charuhasan as Minister
- Kozhikode Narayanan Nair as Leader
- Kanakalatha as Prof Ravi's wife
- Sadiq as SP John Scaria
- Kanya Bharathi as Meera
- Ragini as Khusboo
