= Jalamarmaram =

- Directed by: T. K. Rajeev Kumar
- Screenplay by: B. Unnikrishnan; T. K. Rajeev Kumar
- Produced by: Radhika Suresh Gopi; Latha Kurian Rajeev
- Starring: P. Balachandran; Aswin Thampy
- Cinematography: Ravi Varman
- Edited by: A. Sreekar Prasad
- Music by: Sharreth
- Production company: Blue Mermaid Pictures Co.
- Release date: 1999
- Country: India
- Language: Malayalam
- Budget: ₹8 lakh

Jalamarmaram (lit. 'Mermaid') is a 1999 Indian Malayalam-language drama film directed by T. K. Rajeev Kumar and co-written with B. Unnikrishnan. The cast includes P. Balachandran and Aswin Thampy in the lead roles.

== Cast ==
- Aswin Thampy
- P. Balachandran
- Gayathri Ashokan
- Anila Sreekumar
- V. C. Haris

== Production ==
The film's theme deals with the pollution of Mavoor river due to the waste disposed from Mavoor Rayons Factory and the repercussions in surrounding lives. The story is told from the perception of a boy, who is obsessed with mermaids. The film's production was completed with a cost of ₹8 lakh.

== Synopsis ==
Jalamarmaram is the story of Nirmal, a young boy whose father – a long time campaigner against a large chemical factory near their village - dies of cancer. Nirmal investigates the cause of the cancer and tracks it back to the toxic waste being expelled by the factory. Nirmal turns to the fables that his father told him for comfort and guidance and soon the world of childhood fantasy bleeds into reality when he meets a mermaid at a traveling carnival who helps him on his quest.

== Accolades ==
The film won two National Film Awards and three Kerala State Film Awards. After winning the national award, Kumar commented: "the awards are an incentive for my effort to set up a welfare fund for the people of Mavoor, whose plight my film depicts".

47th National Film Awards

- Best Film on Environment Conservation/Preservation – Radhika Suresh Gopi, Latha Kurian Rajeev, T. K. Rajeev Kumar
- Best Child Artist – Aswin Thampy

Kerala State Film Awards

- Second Best Film – Radhika Suresh Gopi, Latha Kurian Rajeev, T. K. Rajeev Kumar
- Best Screenplay – B. Unnikrishnan, T. K. Rajeev Kumar
- Best Editor – A. Sreekar Prasad
