= Star Singer =

- Star Singer
- Genre: Reality
- Created by: Asianet
- Presented by: Rimi Tomy; Joy John Antony; Afsal; Gayathri Ashokan; Ranjini Haridas; Meera Nandan; Devi; Ramya Raveendran; Jewel Mary; Varsha Ramesh; Midhun Ramesh
- Judges: M. G. Sreekumar; Ouseppachan; P. Unnikrishnan; G. Venugopal; Sharreth; Usha Uthup; Vani Jayaram; M. Jayachandran; Arundhathi; K. S. Chithra; Vidhu Prathap; Sithara Krishnakumar; Anuradha Sriram; Stephen Devassy; Rimi Tomy; Manjari; Sujatha Mohan; Srinivas (singer)
- Country of origin: India
- No. of seasons: 10 + 3 (Junior)

Production
- Running time: 60–90 minutes per episode

Original release
- Network: Asianet; JioHotstar
- Release: 22 April 2006 – present

Star Singer is an Indian music reality television competition broadcast on Asianet. The show features contestants aged 15 to 35, who compete based on their singing talent and stage presence. From Seasons 1 to 7, viewer voting was conducted via SMS, with audience votes contributing partially to contestant advancement. Starting with Season 8, voting shifted to Disney+ Hotstar, the official OTT platform of Star Network. The competition includes a panel of judges comprising prominent figures from the Malayalam music industry, who evaluate performances and assign scores throughout the contest. In 2009, a spin-off titled Star Singer Junior was introduced, focusing on younger participants.

== History ==
=== 2006 ===
Star Singer debuted in 2006, modeled after Indian Idol. Malayalam music director M. Jayachandran served as the chief judge, joined by K. S. Chithra, M. G. Radhakrishnan, Tippu, Deepak Dev, Jassie Gift, and others. The show was co-hosted by Vidhu Prathap, Rimi Tomy, and Joy John Antony. From around 7,000 applicants, Arun Raj and Kavita Jayaram emerged as winners in the male and female categories, respectively. Prizes included ₹100,000, playback contracts, and performance deals abroad. The season was produced by Prathap Nair.

=== 2007 ===
Season 2 introduced a new format and was hosted by Ranjini Haridas. Judges included M. G. Sreekumar, Sharreth, and Usha Uthup, with a rotating celebrity guest judge. Over 20,000 applied, 45 contestants were selected after auditions. The winner, Najim Arshad, received an apartment worth ₹4 million. Runners-up included Durga Viswanath, Thushar M.K., and Arun Gopan.

=== 2008 ===
Launched by actor Suresh Gopi, Season 3 featured judges Ouseppachan, P. Unnikrishnan, and weekly guest judges. Ranjini Haridas returned as host following popular demand. The finale aired live on 25 April 2009, with M. S. Viswanathan as chief guest. Vivek Anand and Sonia Aamod won in the male and female categories. Runner-up Rahul R. Laxman received 101 tolas of gold.

=== 2009 ===
Season 4 was judged by K. S. Chithra, M. G. Sreekumar, and Sharreth, and hosted again by Ranjini Haridas. Joby John won the title, receiving a ₹10 million villa from Travancore Builders. The finale, held on 1 August 2010, featured judges S. P. Balasubrahmanyam and others. Runner-up Sreenath Nair received 30 million SMS votes.

=== 2010 ===
Kalpana Raghavendar won Season 5, earning a villa worth ₹10 million. Mridula Varier and Immanuel Henry were the first and second runners-up, winning gold worth ₹1.5 million and ₹750,000, respectively. Antony John, third runner-up, also received a ₹500,000 prize from K. J. Yesudas on behalf of actor Mohanlal.

=== 2011–2012 ===
Season 6 concluded on 22 December 2012, with Merin Gregory declared the winner. Rajiv Rajasekharan was the runner-up. Judges included Hariharan, K. S. Chithra, M. G. Sreekumar, Anuradha Sriram, and M. Jayachandran. The show was produced by Asianet and directed by Prathap Nair.

=== 2014 ===
The seventh season of Star Singer started airing in March 2014. The show was hosted by Rimi Tomy and M. G. Sreekumar, who were also the judges, along with Anuradha Sriram. The title winner of Sunfeast Delishus Star Singer was Malavika Anilkumar from Thrissur, Kanimangalam.She has won many competitions other than Idea Star Singer. She won a flat in Kochi worth Rupees 5 million from Confident Group run by Dr. C. J. Roy; followed by Reshma Raghavendra, Aslam Abdul Majid at second and third position respectively.

=== 2020-2022 ===
The eighth season was launched on 27 December 2020.The show was hosted by Jewel Mary. The launch event was telecasted on 3 January 2021. Due to the COVID-19 Pandemic, the show was put on hold after 43 episodes in July 2021 and relaunched with a mega event on 2 January 2022.The show ended on 19 June 2022 and the title winner is Ridhu Krishna. He won a flat worth Rupees 1 crore from Confident Group run by Dr. C. J. Roy.

=== 2023-2024 ===
Star Singer Season 9 premiered on 15 and 16 July 2023 and aired on Asianet every weekend. Judged by K. S. Chithra, Sithara, and Vidhu Prathap, and hosted by RJ Varsha, the contestants were initially split into two teams – Convent Music School and Gurukulam Sangeetha Vidyalayam. Though the finale was planned for February 2024, the show was extended after a break following Bigg Boss Malayalam Season 6. The planned finale was held as a 'Summer Festival' (aired on 11 and 17 February 2024), with the Rs 5 lakh prize money shared among the top 10 contestants.

The show was relaunched with a mega event on June 23, 2024, introducing two new wild card contestants alongside the existing top 10. The grand finale was held on October 20, 2024, at Adlux Convention Centre, Angamaly. Aravind Dileep Nair emerged as the winner, receiving a prize of ₹50 lakhs sponsored by Confident Group.

=== 2025-2026 ===
Season 10 was announced during the Season 9 finale, making Star Singer the first Malayalam reality show to reach 10 seasons. Auditions concluded in Kochi on 2 February 2025, and the show launched on 29–30 March. From 35 mega audition participants, 18 were selected for the main stage, with 4 more joining as wild card entrants later. From July 2025, the show was on a temporary break for Bigg Boss Malayalam Season 7, with a special Monsoon Festival episode featuring Mohanlal and Usha Uthup aired on 27 July 2025. The show relaunched after break with an event with special guests Urvashi and Nikhila Vimal aired on 23 November 2025. This season was hosted by Varsha Ramesh and Midhun Ramesh.The grand finale was aired on 30 August 2026 with Shivapriya Suresh emerging as winner, winning Rs 50 Lakh Cash Prize sponsored by Varma Homes.

== Seasons ==
Season	Aired from	Aired till	Sponsors	Judges	Anchor(s)	Winners	Finalists	Telecast Frequency
1	22 April 2006	18 February 2007	Idea Cellular	M. Jayachandran, K. S. Chithra, Tippu / M. G. Radhakrishnan, Deepak Dev/ Jassie Gift / Chitra Iyer/ Sugeetha Menon	Rimi Tomy, Afzal, Joy John Antony / Biju Narayanan	Arun Raj, Kavita Jayaram	Weekends only	
2	21 May 2007	26 April 2008	Idea Cellular	Sharreth, M. G. Sreekumar, Usha Uthup	Ranjini Haridas, Meera Nandan	Najim Arshad	Durga Viswanath, Thushar M K, Arun Gopan	Mon – Fri
3	28 April 2008	25 April 2009	Idea Cellular	Sharreth, M. G. Sreekumar, Ouseppachan,/ P. Unnikrishnan, /G. Venugopal; Usha Uthup /L. R. Eswari	Ranjini Haridas, Ramya Raveendran, Devi	Vivekanand, Sonia	Gayathri, Jins Gopinath, Rahul, Prasobh	Mon – Fri
4	27 April 2009	1 August 2010	Idea Cellular	Sharreth, M. G. Sreekumar, K. S. Chithra	Ranjini Haridas	Joby John	Sreenath Nair, Preethi Warrier, Anju Joseph, Vidhyashankar	Mon – Fri
5	2 August 2010	24 September 2011	Idea Cellular	Sharreth, M. G. Sreekumar, K. S. Chithra, Anuradha Sriram	Ranjini Haridas	Kalpana Raghavendar	Mridula Warrier, Anthony, Immanuel	Mon – Fri
6	25 September 2011	22 December 2012	Idea Cellular	M. Jayachandran, M. G. Sreekumar, K. S. Chithra, Anuradha Sriram	Ranjini Haridas	Merin Gregory	Megha, Merin; Nandu, Rajeev, Shamshad, Sukesh Kuttan	Mon – Fri
7	31 March 2014	21 September 2014	Sunfeast Delicious	Rimi Tomy; M. G. Sreekumar; Anuradha Sriram	Rimi Tomy	Malavika Anilkumar	Malavika Anilkumar; Reshma; Aslam, Varsha; Vaisakhy, Janaki, Manu	Mon – Fri
8	27 December 2020	19 June 2022	Nestlé Munch & Swayamvara Silks	Main Panel: Sharreth, K. S. Chithra , G. Venugopal, Manjari, Stephen Devassy; Guest Jury: Kalpana Raghavendar; Vidyadharan; Kavalam Sreekumar; P.Jayachandran; P. Susheela; Nedumudi Venu; Shreya Ghoshal	Alina Padikkal (Shruthy Finals), Jewel Mary	Rithu Krishna	Akhil Dev, Arjun Unnikrishnan, Jeril Shaji, Krithika S, Milan Joy, Rithu Krishna, Vishnumaya Ramesh	Weekends only
9	15 July 2023	20 October 2024	Cutee the Beauty Soap(2023-2024); Pavizham Rice & MyG Future(2024)	Main Panel: K. S. Chithra Vidhu Prathap Sithara Krishnakumar; Guest Jury: M. M. Keeravani; Vidyasagar; Sujatha Mohan; Srinivas; Rahul Raj; Ranjin Raj; Hariharan	Varsha Ramesh , Ranjini Haridas (Grand Finale)	Aravind Dileep Nair	Aravind, Disha, Nanda, Anusree, Balram, Sreerag	Weekends only
10	29 March 2025	30 August 2026	Indian Institute of Commerce Lakshya & Skei Ice Creams/ White Gold	Main Panel: K. S. Chithra Vidhu Prathap Sithara Krishnakumar; Guest Jury: Rahul Raj; Ranjin Raj; Kailas Menon; Jagadish; K. S. Harisankar; Srinivas; Rajiv Menon; Mano; Ousepachan; D Imman	Varsha Ramesh, Mithun Ramesh	Shivapriya Suresh	Shivapriya Suresh, Theertha Sathyan, Krishna Sree, Arjun KC, Vaisakhan Anil, Suryanarayanan	Weekends only

=== Junior ===
Season	Aired from	Aired till	Sponsors	Judges	Anchor(s)	Winners	Finalists	Telecast Frequency
1	6 September 2008	14 February 2010	Nestlé Munch	Sujatha Mohan, G. Venugopal, Gopinath Muthukad	Akhila Sasidharan	Swetha Ashok	Vishnu, Sadhika, Athira	Weekends only
2	20 February 2010	15 August 2011	Nestlé Munch	Sujatha Mohan, G. Venugopal, Gopinath Muthukad	Nazriya Nazim	Adarsh	Yadukrishnan, Vishnu, Vaishakhi	Weekends only
3	30 October 2022	19 March 2023	Mercely's Ice cream	Sithara Krishnakumar; Kailas Menon, Manjari, Stephen Devassy Guest Jury: K. S. Chithra Mano	Jewel Mary	Pallavi Ratheesh	Serah Robin, Saatvik S Satheesh, Pallavi Ratheesh, Hitaishini Bineesh, Aryan S N	Mon- Fri (Until 25 November 2022) Weekends Only (From 3 December 2022)

== Controversies ==
=== SMS ===
Asianet has not made clear how the SMS votes are attributed before and after on each contestants reaching the 'danger zone' leading to their elimination. It is alleged that the SMS votes received are not added to decide the ranking of the contestants. The number or the percentage of SMS votes received by each contestants are kept private from the viewers of the show. Since the channel has its reach over 60 countries including the Indian sub-continent, Sri Lanka, China, South East Asia, Middle East, Europe, United States, Singapore and the lower half of the former Soviet Union at various time zones, the SMS voting end-time was initially not announced. Asianet later clarified after the eighth stage that SMS voting deadlines are based on Indian Time.

According to Asianet sources, for the Grand Finale, weightage of SMS was just 5% of overall score with judges' score attributing the rest 95%.

=== Prizes ===
There are criticism from various corners saying that many of the winners didn't actually opt to receive the prizes because of the huge tax they had to pay for receiving the villa. That means the channel's advertisement of getting a villa through their sponsor is questioned. This got more visible in the case of ISS season 4 winner Joby John
