= P. K. Gopi =

Indian poet

P. K Gopi
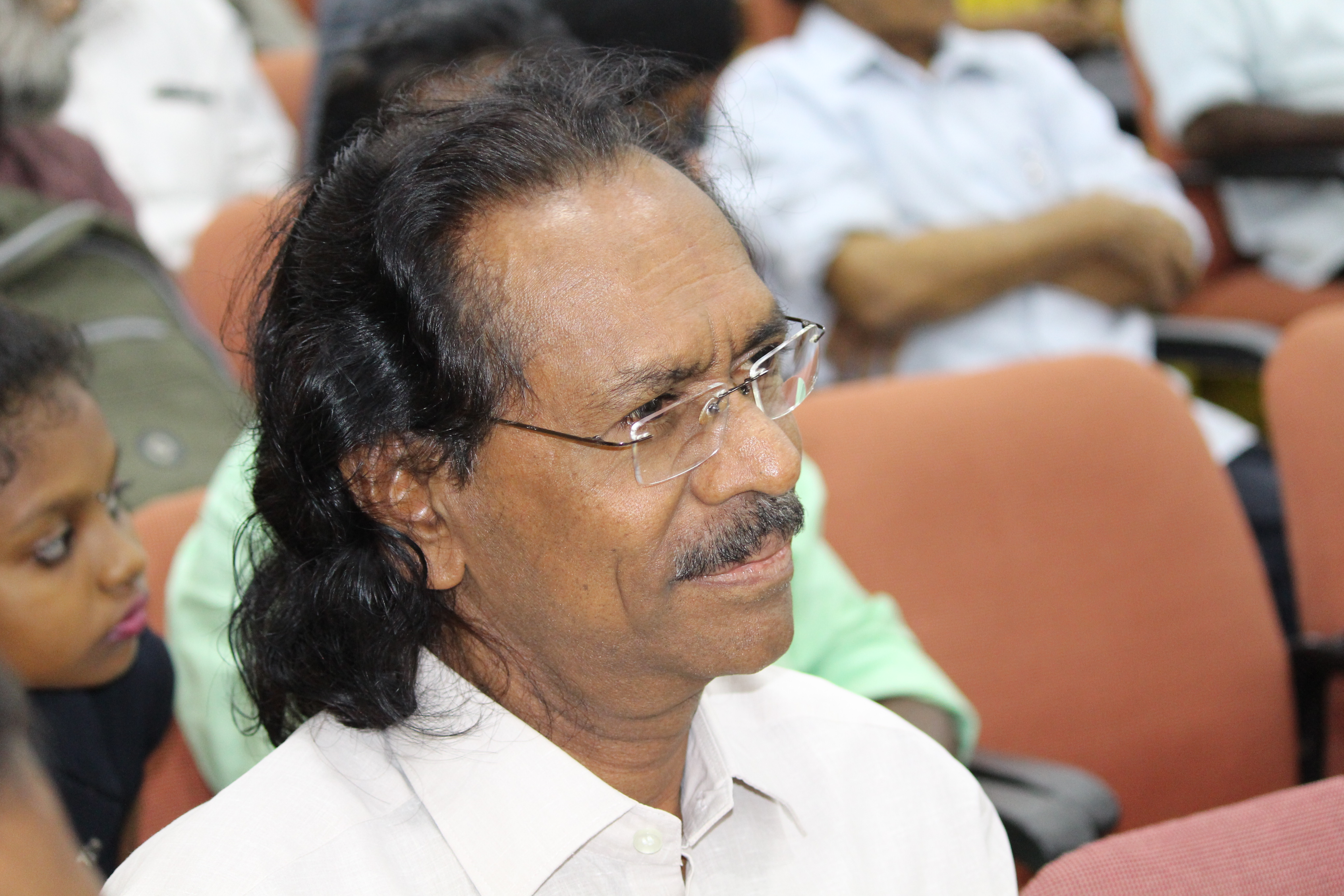
- P.K. Gopi
- Born: 8 June 1949 (age 77); Pathanamthitta, Kerala
- Occupations: physiotherapist, poet
- Years active: 1979-present
- Partner: Komala Gopi
- Children: 2
- Website: https://peekegopi.wordpress.com

P. K. Gopi is an Indian poet writing in the language Malayalam and also a physiotherapist. He is a lyricist for Malayalam films and was a member of Kerala Sahitya Akademi. He was the former state president of Yuvakalasahithi.

He is the author of more than 27 Malayalam books in the streams of poetry, memoirs and children's literature. He also penned for 30 Malayalam films.

== Biography ==
P.K.Gopi was born in Kodumon-Angadickal village in Pathanamthitta District of Kerala on 8 June 1949. His father is P.K. Kunjupillai and mother, Kalyani. He completed his schooling from Angadikkal S.N.V.High School. He also studied at Pathanapuram St. Stephens college and Velloor Christian Medical College. He retired from Government Service as a Physiotherapist. He won the Jesees award given for the best govt employee. His songs have been part of many professional dramas/serials/documentaries /stage performances in Malayalam. His poems have been translated into English and other Indian languages.

In 2018 Gopi received the Kendra Sahitya Akademi Award for Children's Literature award for his collection of memoirs/stories, Olachoottinte Velicham. In 2024 Mr. Gopi was honoured by the Kerala Sahitya Akademi for Akademi's Samagra Sambhavana Puraskaram for his lifetime contribution to Malayalam literature.

== Notable works ==
- Oolachoottinte Velicham

== Film lyrics ==
He has written lyrics for the following Malayalam films.

- Dhanam
- Shubhayathra
- Peruvannapurathe Visheshangal
- Sasneham
- Mannadiar Penninu Chenkotta Chekkan
- Ottayal pattalam
- Anashvaram
- Neelagiri
- Bhoomika
- Naaraayam
- Mukthi
- Thirumanassu
- Oru Kochu Bhoomikilukkam
- Kusruthi kaattu
- Mattanchery
- Pacha manga

== Achievements and awards ==
- Kunjunni Award
