= Sesham =

- Directed by: T. K. Rajeev Kumar
- Written by: T. K. Rajeev Kumar
- Produced by: Latha Kurien Rajeev; K. Madhavan
- Starring: Jayaram; Geetu Mohandas; Biju Menon; P. Balachandran
- Cinematography: Rajeev Ravi
- Edited by: A. Sreekar Prasad
- Music by: Sharreth
- Production companies: Blue Mermaid Picture Company; Asianet
- Release date: 27 September 2002
- Country: India
- Language: Malayalam

Sesham is a 2002 Indian Malayalam-language drama film written and directed by T. K. Rajeev Kumar, starring Jayaram, Geetu Mohandas, Biju Menon and P. Balachandran. Jayaram's portrayal of the character Lonappan was praised by The Hindu.

The film received critical acclaim, it won four Kerala State Film Awards, including Best Film, Best Story, Best Editor, and Best Sound Recordist.

== Cast ==
- Jayaram as Lonappan
- Geetu Mohandas as Meera
- Biju Menon as Sub-Collector Shyam Sunder IAS
- Murali as Venki
- P. Balachandran as Mental asylum Patient
- Siddhique as Police Officer
- Mithun Ramesh as Nithin
- P. Sreekumar as Rtd. Major

== Awards ==
Kerala State Film Awards

- Best Film – Latha Kurien Rajeev, K. Madhavan, T. K. Rajeev Kumar
- Best Story - T. K. Rajeev Kumar
- Best Editor – A. Sreekar Prasad
- Best Sound Recordist – Simon Selvaraj

Cinema Express Awards

- Best Film
- Best Director - T. K. Rajeev Kumar
- Best Actor - Jayaram
