= Ranjini Haridas =

Indian TV anchor

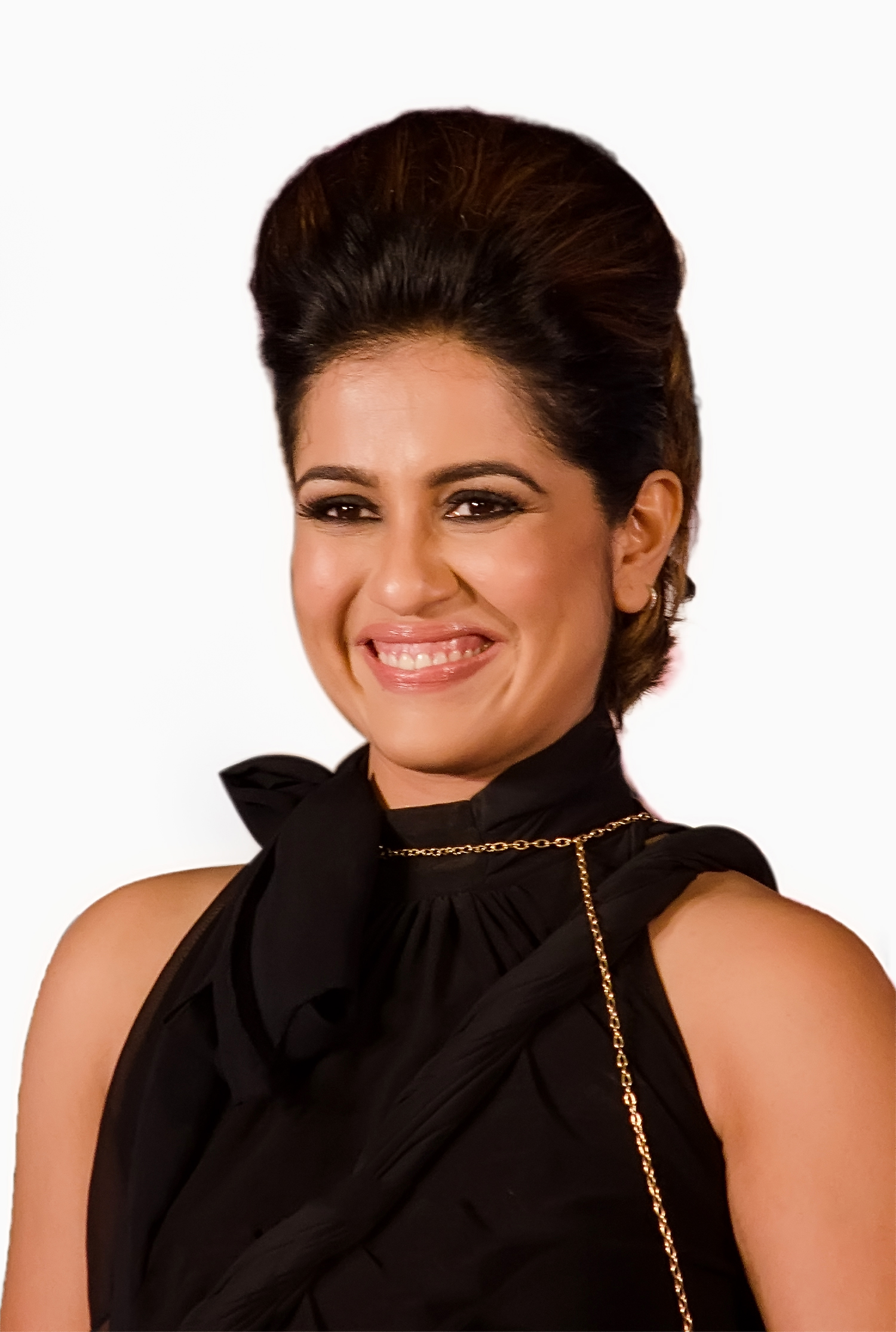
- Occupations: Actor; Singer; Anchor
- Years active: 2001–present

Ranjini Haridas is an Indian television presenter, actress, model and YouTuber . She became popular through the Star Singer TV show of Asianet.Throughout 5 seasons of the show, she was the host.

== Career ==
=== Hosting career ===
Ranjini Haridas went to London for her higher studies. On her return, she ventured into compering and found it lucrative. Since then she has hosted several stage shows such as Asianet Film Awards, Amrita TV Film Awards, Asiavision Awards, Flowers TV awards, Jaihind Film Awards and SIIMA. Ranjini was crowned Miss Kerala at Femina Miss Kerala - 2000.

=== Film appearances ===
Her first recognized film appearance was for a cameo roles in China Town (2011) and Thalsamayam Oru Penkutty (2013). Later she played as a police officer in the film Entry (2013) opposite Baburaj, it was her first leading role. Since 2015 she has been an integral part of Flower TV both in program management and TV hosting. She hosted the Star Singer program on Asianet TV from 2007 to 2012. In 2017 she returned to Asianet with Run Baby Run, a revamped celebrity interview. She was a participant in Bigg Boss Malayalam (season 1).

== Television ==
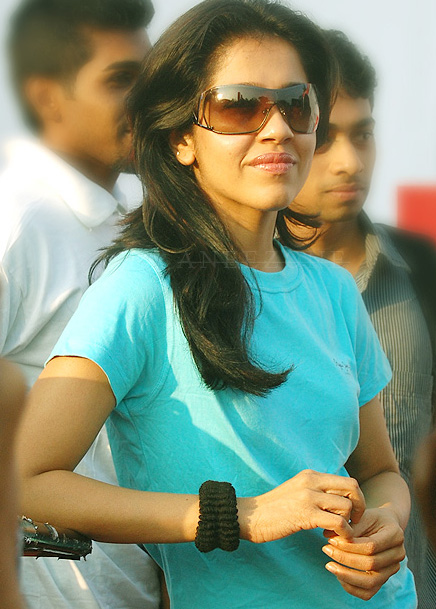
Ranjini in 2009

- All Television shows are in Malayalam-language.

Year	Show	Role	Channel	Notes
2007	Sahasikante Lokam	Host	Asianet	
2007	Star Singer	Host	Asianet	
2008	Star Singer	Host	Asianet	Won, Asianet Television Awards - Best Anchor
2009	Star Singer 4	Host	Asianet	
2010	Star Singer 5	Host	Asianet	Won, Asianet Television Awards - Best Anchor
2011-12	Star Singer 6	Host	Asianet	
2013	Sundari Neeyum Sundaran Njanum	Judge	Asianet	
2013-14	Cinema Company	Host	Kaumudy TV	
2014	Vanitharathnam 3	Host	Amrita TV	
2014	Bhima Music India	Host	Asianet	
2015	Indian Music League	Host	Flowers TV	
2017	Run Baby Run	Host	Asianet Plus	
2017	Komedy Circus	Judge	Mazhavil Manorama	
2017	Indian Super League 3	Host	Asianet Movies	
2017	Ithanu Njan Paranja Nadan	Host	Surya TV	
2018	Indian Super League 4	Host	Asianet Movies	
2018	Bigg Boss Malayalam 1	Contestant	Asianet	Evicted on Day 63
2019	Surya Super Singer	Host	Surya TV	
2020-2021	Ingane Oru Bharyayum Bharthavum	Host	Flowers TV	
2021	Star Magic	Mentor	Flowers TV	
2021	Onamamankam	Host	Surya TV	special show
2021	Asianet Big B Dhamaka	Host	Asianet	special show
2023	Surajum bossaya Tharangalum	Host	Asianet	special show
2024	Bigg Boss Malayalam 6	Host	Asianet	Mohanlal Birthday special episode
2024	Star Singer season 9	Host	Asianet	Grand finale
2025	Sa Re Ga Ma Pa Keralam 3	Host	Zee Keralam	
2026	Bigg Boss Agnipareeksha	Judge	Asianet	

== Filmography ==
=== Films ===
Year	Title	Role	Notes
1986	Geetham	School kid	Child artiste (uncredited)
2011	China Town	Herself	Cameo appearance
2012	Thalsamayam Oru Penkutty	Television presenter	Cameo appearance
2013	Entry	ACP P. Shreya	Debut in Leading Role
2013	What The F (WTF)	Ranjini	In one of the three segments
2013	Otta Oruthiyum Shariyalla	Khayal	
2019	Mera Naam Shaji	Diana Aby	Cameo appearance
2023	Khali Purse of Billionaires	Business Investor	
2023	Maheshum Marutiyum	Ranjini	
2023	Pookkaalam	Swamini	
2023	Valatty	Margaret	voice artist

== Controversies ==
She was openly criticised by veteran actor Jagathy Sreekumar for overstepping her boundaries as an anchor in the singing contest Star Singer. There were allegations from contestants that she was doing so to influence judges in favour of certain contestants. Ranjini openly spoke about his verbal tirade and pointed out towards the inherent sexism in the Malayalam industry. She was shamed by a mob for her alleged use of unparliamentary words and physical attack on a passenger who grazed her in a jammed airport, for this she later responded the community was led by misogynists. A similar incident happened when a passenger created ruckus when he alleged that she tried to bypass queue in Airport in an attempt to use special privileges, both the parties registered cases against each other for abusive verbal attack.

Ranjini appeared in an interview with Ranjini Jose for Grihalakshmi Magazine. On Friendship Day, they spoke about how good friendships are interpreted as lesbian relationship in Kerala.

She reacted against the cruelty to animals, specifically to street dogs in Kerala. She responded that 'Humanity is dead' when a woman set fire on a dog & 7 puppies at Kochi, Kerala.

Preceded by Reshma George	Miss Kerala; 2000	Succeeded by Nova Krishnan
