= Smart City (film) =

2006 film directed by B. Unnikrishnan

- DVD Cover
- Directed by: B. Unnikrishnan
- Written by: B. Unnikrishnan
- Produced by: G. P. Vijayakumar
- Starring: Suresh Gopi; Murali; Jayasurya
- Cinematography: S. Saravanan; Shamdat Sainudeen
- Edited by: Manoj
- Music by: Manikanth Kadri
- Distributed by: Seven Arts
- Release date: 15 December 2006
- Running time: 120 minutes
- Country: India
- Language: Malayalam

Smart City is a 2006 Indian Malayalam-language action film written and directed by B. Unnikrishnan (in his directorial debut). The film stars Suresh Gopi, Murali, Jayasurya, Gopika, Lakshmi Gopalaswami, Sanjay Mitra, Manoj K. Jayan and Siddique. This is the debut movie of Unnikrishnan as a director.

== Plot ==
A 10-year-old orphan raises his hand against a police officer who commits an act of injustice. Impressed, Sekharan, the godfather-like gang leader who cares for the poor, gives him shelter. The boy grows up to be Sekharan's most trusted associate, Madhavan. Sekharan's daughter Sarada is married to Sarath Chandran, a town planning officer. A real-estate group, Kottooran Group, in collusion with finance minister Reghuram, wants to forcibly evict over 6,000 families from the land for a Smart-City-type industrial project. Sekharan is able to foil the plans of the Kottoorans with the help of the Chief Minister. Thus begins the feud between the Kottoorans and Sekharan. The real brain behind the Kottoorans and the people who remained in the background now comes out into the open.

== Cast ==
- Suresh Gopi as Madhavan, Shekaran's adopted son
  - Ashwin as Young Madhavan
- Murali as Chandrashekharan (Shekharan)
- Jayasurya as Varun Nambiar, Arun's younger brother
- Gopika as Devika, Madhavan's adopted sister and Shekharan's illicit daughter
- Lakshmi Gopalaswamy as Sharada, Shekharan's biological daughter and Sharath Chandran's wife
- Sanjay Mitra as Sunil Kotturan
- Manoj K. Jayan as Sarath Chandran alias Sharath Bhai, Sharada's husband and the main antagonist
- Siddique as Commissioner Arun Nambiar IPS, Varun's elder brother
- Shammi Thilakan as Finance Minister Raghuram Vaidhyan, the secondary antagonist
- Rajmohan Unnithan as Joseph Kotturan, Sunil's father
- Rajan P Dev as Chief Minister Velayudha Kurup
- Baburaj as SI R.K. Divakaran
- Santhosh Jogi as Jose, Madhavan's henchman
- Subair as Thomas Kotturan, Sunil's uncle and Joseph's brother
- Rajesh Hebbar as Advocate Joy Philip
- T. P. Madhavan as Sathyasheelan
- Beena Antony as Saleena
- Kunjan as Alphonse
- P. Sreekumar as Sulaiman

== Soundtrack ==
- Neelakurinji pootha mizhiyinayil...
