= Up & Down: Mukalil Oralundu =

- Directed by: T. K. Rajeev Kumar
- Screenplay by: Sunny Joseph; Manuel George; G. R. Indugopan
- Story by: T. K. Rajeev Kumar
- Produced by: V. Balachandran; R. Karunamoorthy; Latha Kurien Rajeev
- Starring: Indrajith Sukumaran; Meghana Raj; Prathap Pothen; Remya Nambeesan
- Cinematography: Jomon T. Thomas
- Edited by: B. Ajithkumar
- Music by: Prashanth Techno (background score); M. Jayachandran
- Production company: Blue Mermaid Picture Company
- Release date: 24 May 2013
- Country: India
- Language: Malayalam

Up & Down: Mukalil Oralundu is a 2013 Malayalam psychological thriller film directed by T. K. Rajeev Kumar. The film is loosely based on the 2011 American film Elevator. Its narrative centres on a group of nine individuals who become trapped in an elevator, where a murder investigation gradually reveals hidden relationships and personal secrets among the occupants.

The ensemble cast includes Indrajith Sukumaran, Prathap Pothen, K. B. Ganesh Kumar, Rajith Menon, Baiju Santhosh, Nandhu, Remya Nambessan, Shruthy Menon, and Master Devaraman as the individuals trapped inside the elevator. The film also marked the acting debut of Basil Joseph.

Produced by V. Balachandran, R. Karunamurthi, and Latha Kurien Rajeev under the banner Blue Mermaid Picture Company, the film was written by Sunny Joseph and Manuel George, with cinematography by Jomon T. John.

The film is set almost entirely within the confined space of an elevator, with the narrative unfolding over the course of a few hours on a single day.

== Plot ==
The film follows a group of residents and visitors who become trapped in an elevator while travelling to a celebration at a high-rise apartment building. Among them are a police commissioner, the building's owner and his wife, a writer, an information technology professional and his partner, an expatriate returning from the United States, a lift operator, and a young boy searching for his mother.

When the body of a woman is discovered on top of the elevator, the commissioner begins investigating the apparent murder while the occupants remain confined. As the investigation progresses, hidden relationships, personal secrets, and conflicting accounts emerge, revealing connections between the passengers and the victim. The inquiry ultimately uncovers a complex conspiracy involving the victim's attempts to seek justice for past wrongs and the accidental circumstances surrounding her death. The film concludes with the exposure of the truth behind the crime, leading to further acts of violence and the arrest of the lift operator.

== Cast ==
- Indrajith Sukumaran as Shivan (Thampuran), an ex-army officer-turned-lift operator
- Meghana Raj as Vedikettu Deepa, a sex worker
- Prathap Pothen as Edathil Govindan Nair, a writer
- Baiju as Sam Christy, a wealthy builder
- K. B. Ganesh Kumar as Commissioner Salim Khan IPS
- Rejith Menon as Sooraj, a techie
- Shruthy Menon as Mithra
- Remya Nambeesan as Kalamandalam Prasanna, Christy's wife
- Master Devaraman as Shanku
- Nandu as Cheriyan
- Meghna Nair
- Kochu Preman as Chandrappan, the lift mechanic
- Basil Joseph as Assistant Lift Mechanic
- Vijayakumar
- Jayakrishnan as Surendran
- Lakshmi Sanal

== Production ==
The script and dialogues are written by Sunny Joseph, Manual George and Indugopan. Rajeev Kumar says there was a consensus among the script writers and him as a director.

Major portion of the film was shot from Chithranjali Studios in Thiruvananthapuram where the lift was constructed using plywood, the insides covered with embossed metal sheets. Mohandas was the art director for the film.

During the development of the screenplay, the writers and director concluded that the narrative offered limited scope for conventional song sequences and were concerned that their inclusion might disrupt the film's pacing. As a result, the film does not feature any songs apart from a promotional track. The background score was composed by Prashanth Techno in collaboration with Quartet Tones.

== Soundtrack ==
Up And Down Mukalil Oraalundu

Soundtrack album
- Released: April 2013
- Genre: Feature film soundtrack
- Label: Manorama Music

The music of the film was composed by M. Jayachandran collaborating with T.K. Rajeev Kumar after Rathinirvedam. Ramya Nambeesan sung the theme song. Background Score was composed by the debutante, Prashanth Techno. .

| No. | Title | Lyrics | Singer(s) | Length |
|---|---|---|---|---|
| 1. | "Vaanam Chuttum Megham" | Rafeeq Ahmed | Vijay Yesudas & Mridula Warrier | 03:42 |
| 2. | "Up And Down Theme" | Rafeeq Ahmed | Ramya Nambeesan | 03:38 |
| 3. | "Here We Go Again" | Jeremaniah John | Jeremaniah John | 04:28 |
| Total length: | | | | 11:49 |

== Release ==
Up & Down: Mukalil Oralundu was set to release on 17 May 2013. The date was postponed by a week even after giving the mandatory advertisements announcing the release of the film on 17 May in the popular dailies. The film released on 24 May. A critic wrote that ""Up and Down comes across as a good-watch despite minor, negligible doubts it leaves behind".
