= Charithram =

- Directed by: G. S. Vijayan
- Written by: S. N. Swamy
- Starring: Mammootty; Rahman; Lizy; Shobhana
- Music by: Rajamani; M. G. Radhakrishnan
- Production company: Suryodaya Creations
- Release date: 26 January 1989
- Country: India
- Language: Malayalam

Charithram (transl. History) is a 1989 Indian Malayalam-language thriller film starring Mammootty and Rahman, along with Shobana, Lizy, Jagathy Sreekumar, Janardhanan, Murali and Pappu in other pivotal roles. It was written by S. N. Swamy and directed by G. S. Vijayan in his directorial debut. The story is loosely based on the 1958 film Chase a Crooked Shadow, the title of which is openly mentioned in one of the dialogues in the movie. The film tells the story of Philip who is desperate to prove that Raju is not his brother but a lookalike and an imposter. It is considered one of the best thriller movies in Malayalam.

== Plot ==
Philip Manavaalan is the owner of a financing company in Kerala and the movie begins with his wedding preparations. After the wedding, Philip's wife, Cecily is curious about Raju, Philip's dead brother and so Philip relates the story of Raju to Cecily.

Raju was young, vibrant and a man of many talents. However, he soon fell prey to the world of drugs and started extracting money to buy drugs from his brother by hook or by crook. Philip, upon learning of his brother's drug problem, admitted him into a rehab facility. Raju appeared to recover and was then sent to Madras (Tamil Nadu) for further studies. On one of his visits to Chennai, Philip realised that Raju had reverted to his old ways and was worse than ever before. One night, Raju stole some money and absconded with Philip's car. Philip later learned of this when he received a call informing him that his car had met with an accident and the car's driver had perished in the explosion. Philip performed the last rites on his brother's body, which was burnt beyond recognition, in Chennai itself and returned to Kerala. Cecily sympathises with her husband and soon gets over this sad incident.

However one day, suddenly Raju returns home and surprises everyone. Philip has a hard time believing that this man is his brother. He performs many tests to prove whether the man is really his brother Raju. He is assisted by his friends in all these tests, but every test yields positive results. Soon almost everyone is convinced that it was indeed Raju who had come back. However, Philip is still doubtful. Meanwhile, Renu the daughter of Philip's friend Cherian a police officer, who had been betrothed to Raju, convinced that Raju had come back, begins an affair with him. Philip sees this and informs Cherian about it. Cherian talks to his daughter trying to convince her what a mistake it would be if it is not Raju. But Renu is adamant and expresses her belief that Raju had returned and also tells that she will marry none but Raju. So, Cherian visits Philip along with their common friend John, who is a lawyer to propose Renu for Raju. But Philip refuses, saying that he doesn't believe it is his brother who had come back. Everyone gets frustrated that Philip still won't accept Raju in spite of the positive results of all the tests conducted before.

At last, Cherian decides to perform a scientific test to prove the truth. He goes to Chennai where Raju's body had been cremated and excavates the remains. He takes a picture of the skull and a picture of Raju and superimposes the two. It doesn't match! Upon reaching his house, he calls John and Shivan Kutty to inform them about this. They go to his house and wait for Philip to come. He comes soon after in the hope that Cherian has got evidence to prove that Raju was dead and it was an impostor who had taken his place. But when he arrives, he finds Cherian in a happy state. Cherian passes on the information to Philip and shows him the super-imposed picture that doesn't match. But still Philip is not convinced. When questioned why, he replies that Raju died lying in his hands. Cherian asks him to elaborate.

Philip then reveals that Raju had not died in a car accident as he said to everyone. The day he died, Raju stole money from Philip's cupboard and tried to escape with it. Philip stopped him and asked him where he was going. Raju rudely said that he was leaving as he could no longer live with Philip. He took the money so that he could live the way he wanted to. Philip begged Raju not to go and ruin himself in bad company. Raju did not listen and tried to go, but Philip held him back. Raju pushed him away. In anger, Philip slapped Raju who lost his balance and fell from the first floor to the ground, breaking his neck and head in the fall. Philip rushed down to his brother and lifted him. But Raju died soon. Shocked at what he had mistakenly done, Philip cries holding his brother's body. Suddenly he realised that he will be held guilty for Raju's death. Seeing no way to prove his innocence, he decides to dispose of Raju's body. He drives to Chennai with Raju's body in his car, pushes the car down a cliff which explodes on impact and returns to Kerala.

Upon hearing Philip's confession, Cherian reveals he already knew about Raju's accidental murder thanks to a Chennai police officer by the name of Akbar who was investigating the same case. But to prove that Philip was the real murderer, Cherian and Akbar hire Albert, a lookalike of Raju to impersonate the latter. Realizing that he was tricked, an ashamed Philip turns himself in. Before he is taken away by Akbar to Chennai, Philip requests Albert to take care of Cicily and marry Renu.

== Cast ==
- Mammootty as Philipose Manavalan (Thampi)
- Rahman in dual role as :
  - Raju Manavalan
  - Albert
- Lizy as Renu
- Shobana as Cecily
- Jagathy Sreekumar as Shivan Kutty
- Janardanan as Cherian
- Murali as Advocate George
- Kuthiravattam Pappu as Nellimattom Krishnan
- Bobby Kottarakkara as Chinnan
- Jagannathan as Sadanandan
- Nandu
- Jalaja as Gracy
- Poojappura Ravi as Kurup
- Adoor Bhawani
- Ramu as Akbar
- Dinesh Panicker as Dr. Sreenivasan
- Anthony Palakkan as SI Rajan
- Harikeshan Thampi as Dr. Pandian
- Disco Shanti (special appearance)
