= Ghoshayaathra =

- Soundtrack cover
- Directed by: G. S. Vijayan
- Written by: T. A. Razzaq
- Story by: Keralapuram Kalam
- Produced by: Good Knight Films presents Anu Cine Arts
- Starring: Sai Kumar
- Cinematography: Vipin Mohan
- Edited by: M. S. Money
- Music by: Johnson
- Release date: 12 February 1993
- Country: India
- Language: Malayalam

Ghoshayaathra (transl. Procession) is a 1993 Indian Malayalam-language film, directed by G. S. Vijayan for Sreelakshmi Creations, starring Sai Kumar in the lead role, supported by Devan, Parvathy and Thilakan playing other important roles. The first title of this film was Khalaasi.

== Plot ==
Ghoshayaathra is the story of Abdu, a married man, affected by Autism, and the people surrounding him. His innocent behavior destroys others' happiness.

It is also a tale on how valuing respect and honour of the family can have disastrous consequences for a family. It also shows how belief in religion is exploited as well as an innocent man's plight at living life.

The movie begins by showing the marriage of Abdu and Shakeela, who fails to see him as a husband due to his issues. He is given a separate area to sleep. It also shows the married life of Naseema and her husband, played by Devan.

Due to some issues, Koya, played by Thilakan asks Abdu to divorce Shakeela. He refuses and the broker/member played by Mamukoya gets it done through the Imam of the mosque.

Thrown out of the house with nowhere to go, he is forced to live on the beach and sleep at the mosque. We are also shown flashbacks of the Koya family and their life before riches. It shows Koya, a poor fisherman who takes home an orphan boy.

Shakeela remarries the groom of Naseema's husband's sister, leading to issues between both the families. It eventually ends in the divorce of Naseema, who was pregnant at the time. She is forced by her parents to abort the baby to save the honour of the family and her father.

Devan, upon knowing this through Abdu, goes to meet Naseema, where he is insulted by Koya and group. He also finds out that she was forced to abort the child. Koya and him make a bet regarding the President elections of the Mosque and if Koya fails, he shall take his old job and bring fish to Fakhruddins home and will allow him to remarry Naseema.

Shakeela, on the other hand, is enjoying a bitter marriage to a man who is a drunkard and only behind money. When questioned by Shakeela about his affairs, he abuses her for being married once before. He also hits her, which turns out to be the limit for her. He then storms out, slamming the door and leaving in his car.

Shakeela arrives back at her home the next day. She is not accepted into her home by her father, but her mother lets her in. They try to make her change her mind. It eventually leads to her thinking about Abdu. Unable to withstand the guilt, she ends her life.

This acts as an eye-opener for Koya, who has also lost the elections. He agrees to let Naseema remarry Fakhruddin's son. But it requires her to be married and divorced by another man as per Islamic law. Hence, as per the idea given to Koya's wife by the member, Abdu is suggested. Koya initially disagrees, eventually agreeing and even going to meet and old friend to get Abdu to agree.

The day of the marriage is fixed and everything happens well. On the day of the divorce, Abdu disagrees, leading to conflict. It is finally shown that it was Naseema who requested him to not divorce her.

The final scene of the movie is a bloodied Abdu and a tired Naseema leaving Koyas house, Saudi Manzil.

== Cast ==
- Sai Kumar as Abdu
- Devan as Jamal Fakhruddin
- Thilakan as Moideen Koya Haaji
- Parvathy as Naseema
- Geetha as Shakeela
- Mamukoya as Member Kutti Moosa
- V. K. Sreeraman as Fakhruddin
- Jose Pellissery as Kumaran
- Santha Devi
- Bahadoor as Zaidali
- Ramachandra
- Sukumari

== Crew ==
- T. A. Shahid - Assistant Director
- Anil C. Pillai - Assistant Director
- Anil C. Menon - Chief Assistant Director
- K. V. Unnikrishnan - Chief Associate Director
- Utpal V. Nayanar - Second Unit Cameraman
