= Aanaval Mothiram =

- Poster
- Directed by: G. S. Vijayan
- Written by: T. Damodaran
- Produced by: Raju Mathew
- Starring: Sreenivasan; Suresh Gopi
- Cinematography: Sunny Joseph
- Edited by: G. Murali
- Music by: Johnson
- Release date: 1991
- Country: India
- Language: Malayalam

Aanaval Mothiram (transl. Elephant tail ring) is a 1991 Indian Malayalam-language film directed by G. S. Vijayan, written by T. Damodaran, and starring Sreenivasan, Suresh Gopi and Gavin Packard.

The plot is loosely based on the 1990 film Short Time.

== Plot ==
Aanaval Mothiram is a piece of traditional jewellery which houses the stiff thick hairs derived from the tails of Indian elephants, in a gold/silver ring. It is considered as a remedy for cowardice according to native beliefs in Kerala and Tamil Nadu. The movie was shot in 1980s Thiruvananthapuram and provides excellent, nostalgic views of how the city used to look prior to the development from the 1990s onwards.

CI James Pallithara and SI Nandakumar alias Nandu are good friends. Nandu is brave and adventurous, whereas James, is lazy and cowardly and tries to avoid action and any matter of risks at any cost. In addition to his lack of courage, James is also a miser. He gets Nandu to taxi him all over the place and never pays his bill at restaurants, leaving Nandu to pick up the bill.

Nandu is in love with Home Minister Ramachandran Nair's daughter Sruthi, who is a doctor in the hospital. James advises Nandu not to embark on a risky relationship with the daughter of a powerful man. James himself is married to Annie, but following an argument with his Pentecostal father-in-law over the treatment of his son Biju whilst the son was sick, James got separated from Annie and now lives with his son. He tries to care for his son alone and has no intention of reconciling with Annie. James is very cautious about his lifestyle and reprimands Nandu for smoking and endangering his life.

A narcotic group led by Guru, is active in the State and they seem to have secret suppliers who are supplying drugs to the general populace. Alberto Fellaini, an international drug career and smuggler, flies in to support this criminal gang to spring four of their captured associates from the jail. When Alberto arrives at the airport from Bangkok, an informer named Abbas (who belongs to a rival group), conveys this information to the police. Alberto checks into a hotel and Nandu arrives there with his team. Following a fight at the hotel and a chase by Nandu and his team, Alberto is arrested when he inadvertently falls into a well; James by chance, whilst trying to hide from Alberto, fell into the same well into which Alberto fell down. However, because it is believed that James tackled Alberto down the well (and James does not deny this misinformation), he gets the award for arresting Alberto, much to the chagrin of Nandu. During interrogation, Alberto is found in possession of drugs and is remanded to police custody.

However, the gang learns about the identity of Abbas (later it is revealed that it is a source from the police department who betrays Abbas) who had provided the information leading to the capture of Alberto. They track Abbas to a restaurant where, incidentally, James has persuaded Nandu to treat him to a meal. Abbas is shot dead by Guru in the restaurant whilst they both meet under the guise of a peace meeting and James, who out of cowardice prevents Nandu from subduing and arresting Guru at the scene, is reprimanded for not doing anything and interfering with justice. Whilst James and Nandu are investigating the crimes, they're attacked by the gang (near Chandrashekaran Nair stadium, Palayam). When the gang attacks, James avoids the encounter by pretending to be unconscious and Nandu has no chance against the whole gang. The judicial case against Alberto takes a bad turn too. A key piece of evidence (the piece of underwear in which Alberto had hidden the drugs whilst he was arrested) is switched by someone in the police department for the underwear of some child, and since the cloth does not fit, Alberto walks out a free man. The Home Minister is more interested in having a high-ranking officer as his future son-in-law and encourages the Commissioner to pay court to Sruthi. Following this, the Commissioner and Nandu have an argument over Sruthi and the Commissioner tasks James with keeping an eye on Nandu. The gang kidnap Shruthi and exchange her for the four criminals who're held by the police.

After a failed attempt to break into the minister's house to meet Sruthi, Nandu gets caught by the security along with James who had followed him in accordance to the Commissioner's orders. The Home Minister views this as an assassination attempt by his rival, the Chief Minister. Nandu and James are beaten up badly on the home minister's orders by the arresting police and the Commissioner washes his hand clean of any involvement with James. James and Nandu face dismissal and to escape from this situation, the home minister's gun man and childhood friend, Mathew Kuruvilla, suggest to the duo to enlist the help of a local politician, Chellappan. Chellapan is a barber by trade but seems to have a lot of influence, money and power. Kuruvilla advises James and Nandu to curry favour with Chellapan by "wining and dining" him and treating him to a courtesan flown in specially from Bombay. Despite a disagreement over enlisting Chellapan's help (Nandu is opposed to giving bribes, whereas James is very pragmatic), a highly satisfied Chellapan persuades the Home Minister to get Nandu and James into the special squad as punishment transfer instead of dismissing them (despite the opposition of the Commissioner who wanted Nandu sacked). Here, the duo are put in dangerous operations to catch criminals. James's many cowardly actions make him the target of ridicule within the squad. The harassment against James is led by John, a supporter of the Commissioner. In the meantime, Kuruvilla is suffering from some unknown eye issues, the home minister suspects that Kuruvilla's drinking habits are to blame.

In the midst of an attempt to arrest the narcotics gang, one of the special squad, Saravanan, gets injured and James pretends to tend to him to avoid the fight. When he learns that the injured Saravanan is to be transferred back to normal police duties, James injures himself to exempt himself from another risky operation. Whilst in hospital, he comes across Kuruvilla who had an auto accident. Kuruvilla, who feared that his accident was due to his consumption of large amounts of alcohol, secretly swaps his blood samples with that of James. Unbeknownst to Kuruvilla, his eyesight loss is not due to his consumption of alcohol but because he is actually suffering from the final stages of Leukaemia; The blood results convince the doctors that it is James who is suffering from stage 4 Leukaemia. Dr. Krishnan Nair (In real life, Dr. Krishnan Nair was a famous cancer specialist and founder of the regional cancer centre in Trivandum) gently tells James that he has very little time left.

James evaluates his options and realises that Annie and Biju will financially struggle once he is no more. He starts to change his life drastically and reconciles with Annie. He starts treating Nandu with respect and affection. To Nandu's utter surprise, James even starts treating him to meals. James attempts to return the medal he got for apprehending Alberto back to Nandu who deserves it (who refuses to take it back). James changes his tune and advises Nandu to continue the relationship with the girl he loves. Nandu watches with shock as James even starts (or attempts) to smoke cigarettes.

At the same time, Alberto Fellaini's group moves from narcotic sales to terrorism, further destabilising the law-and-order situation. James eyes the insurance payout his family would get should he die in action and embarks on impossible, reckless and foolhardy missions to get himself killed in action. In other words, he acts as if he is wearing an Aanval Mothiram and suddenly others find a lot of courage in his actions. Single-handedly, James goes after the gang. He talks a bomb-carrying terrorist into releasing his hostages and surrendering to the police. When John and others try to intimidate and harass James, he hits back brutally and bravely, ending that harassment once and for all. Using enhanced interrogation techniques, James discovers details about the supply network of narcotics in the city (Chellapan was using his barber shop as a front) and shuts that network down, cleaning up the city. Bravely, with utter contempt for his own life, James captures the entire gang, exposes corruption in the police force and finally goes after Alberto. James wins respect from the entire police team by his actions.

Nandu, Sruthi and others watch in amazement at James's transformation. However, little does James know that the medical diagnosis is wrong due to Kuruvilla switching the samples and that he is, in fact, as healthy as he could be. The movie comically chronicles his new-found bravado and how the situation unfolds.

== Cast ==
- Sreenivasan as CI James Pallithara
- Suresh Gopi as SI Nandakumar (Nandu)
- Sara as Sruthi
- Saranya Ponvannan as Annie
- Gavin Packard as Alberto Fellini
- Jagathi Sreekumar as Chellappan
- Karamana Janardanan Nair as Home Minister Krishnankutty Nair
- Riza Bava as Commissioner Sajith Kumar IPS
- Rajan P. Dev as Mathew Kuruvilla
- K.P.A.C. Sunny as DIG Michael Kurien IPS
- Jagannatha Varma as IG Karthikeyan IPS
- Kundara Johny as CI John
- Mohan Raj as Guru
- Ravi Vallathol as Insurance agent
- Vineeth Anil as Biju, James's son
- Jagannathan as Annie's father
- Mohan Jose as Gang member, suicide bomber
- James as Peter, Registrar
- Kothuku Nanappan as Coffin seller

== Remakes ==
Year	Film	Language	Cast	Director
1995	The Gambler	Hindi	Govinda, Shilpa Shetty, Aditya Pancholi	Dayal Nihalani
2013	Ragalaipuram	Tamil	Karunas, Sanjana Singh, Kovai Sarala	Mano
