= Oru Kochu Bhoomikulukkam =

- Directed by: Chandrasekharan
- Starring: Sreenivasan; Monisha; Siddique; Jagadish; Shobhana
- Cinematography: Saloo George
- Music by: S. P. Venkatesh
- Production company: Ragam Movies
- Distributed by: Ragam Movies
- Release date: 23 October 1992
- Country: India
- Language: Malayalam

Oru Kochu Bhoomikulukkam (transl. A small Earthquake) is a 1992 Indian Malayalam-language film, directed by Chandrasekharan. It stars Sreenivasan, Siddique, Monisha, Shobhana, Jagadish, and Prem Kumar . The film's score is by S. P. Venkatesh.

== Synopsis ==
The protagonist, Hari, works in a bank and leads a blissful life. His buddy, Ravi, is a factory manager. Ravi seeks a bride and decides to wed Indu. This rattles Hari, as he and Indu had studied at the same college. Hari fears that Indu will disclose his past and certain incidents that happened in college to his wife, Viji. Hari tries to persuade Ravi to change his mind about marrying Indu. When he doesn't succeed, he tries to spread rumors about Indu to Ravi, and vice versa, to prevent the wedding. Nevertheless, his efforts go in vain.

Hari wants to shift from his present house to avoid Indu after the wedding but his wife doesn't agree. He relies upon his childhood friend, police constable Purushothaman, to aid him. Purushothaman's miscalculated plans get him in trouble. Later, to escape the mire, Purushothaman reveals the truth to Ravi, Indu, and the throng which affects Hari's life. Purushothaman takes the initiative to solve the dispute between the families. Meanwhile, Hari and Viji divorce. Purushothaman finally clears the air and resolves the misunderstanding. The film ends with Hari, Viji, Ravi, and Indu going off on their honeymoon accompanied by Purushothaman as the driver.

== Cast ==
- Sreenivasan as Hari
- Monisha as Viji, Hari's wife
- Siddique as Ravi, Hari's friend
- Shobhana as Adv. Indu, Ravi's wife
- Jagadish as Constable Purushothaman, Hari's friend
- Philomina as Ravi's grandmother
- Sai Kumar as Adv. Abdul Salim, Indu's classmate
- Shyama as Thankamani
- Mamukkoya as Thankappan, thief
- Oduvil Unnikrishnan as Dentist
- Swapna Ravi as Dentist's wife
- Karamana Janardanan Nair as Bharghavan Pillai, Viji's Father
- Kottayam Santha as Viji's mother
- Prem Kumar as snake charmer
- N. F. Varghese as bank manager
- Kanakalatha as Soudhamini, Ravi's maid
- Mohan Jose as Thankamani's husband

== Soundtrack ==
The music was composed by S. P. Venkatesh with lyrics by P. K. Gopi.

| No. | Song | Singers | Lyrics | Length (m:ss) |
|---|---|---|---|---|
| 1 | "Etho Ponthudiyil Thaalam" (Bit) | K. J. Yesudas, K. S. Chithra | P. K. Gopi | |
| 2 | "Kaalamoru Deepam" | K. J. Yesudas | P. K. Gopi | |
