= Entry (film) =

- Directed by: Rajesh Amanakara
- Produced by: Athulya Ashok
- Starring: Baburaj; Ranjini Haridas; Bhagath Manuel; Sija Rose
- Cinematography: Ram Thulasi
- Edited by: Donmax
- Music by: Mejo Joseph
- Production company: Athulya Productions
- Release date: 4 January 2013
- Running time: 107 min
- Country: India
- Language: Malayalam

Entry is a 2013 Malayalam film directed by Rajesh Amanakara, starring Baburaj, Ranjini Haridas, Bhagath Manuel and Sija Rose in the lead roles.

== Plot ==
ACP Shreya and ACP Rishikesh are a married couple, who are on the brink of a divorce and live separately for unknown reasons. Meanwhile, a student named Arjun, works as a mechanic at a repair shop. He falls in love with Subaida, a girl whom Arjun had bumped his bike into. Arjun learns that he must steal bikes for a London-based underworld don ''Lucifer'' aka Palli Biju aka Valiya Vyali, who is known to have a past of selling pirated DVDs from Tamil Nadu. Palli Biju is need of 25 lakhs for going to a dinner at the River Thames . Rishikesh and Shreya must save Arjun and catch Biju.

== Cast ==
- Baburaj as ACP Rishikesh
- Ranjini Haridas as ACP P. Shreya
- Bhagath Manuel as Arjun
- Sija Rose as Subaida, Arjun's love interest
- Ashokan as Thampi, Arjun's mentor
- Jins Baskar as Don Lucifer (Palli Biju), a london based criminal
- Suresh Krishna as Police Commissioner, Rishikesh and Sherya's senior officer
- Sandeep Menon as Dennis, Arjun's friend
- Mahima as Arjun's friend
- Deepika Mohan as Arjun's mother

== Release and reception ==
Prior to release, the film was highly anticipated as it would mark the film debut of television anchor Ranjini Haridas. It was released on 4 January 2013. It received mostly negative reviews with critics panning the film due the poor acting skills and dialogue delivered by Ranjini. Veeyen of Nowrunning.com rated the film 1/5 and concluded that "Ranjini might be the only reason, why you might have walked into the theatre to see the film, in the first place. And 'Entry' should be a disappointment of gigantic proportions, for her fans and detractors alike."
