= Aayiram Naavulla Ananthan =

- Directed by: Thulasidas
- Written by: S. N. Swamy
- Produced by: Allwyn Antony
- Starring: Mammootty; Murali; Gautami; Madhavi
- Cinematography: Saloo George
- Edited by: G. Murali
- Music by: Johnson
- Release date: 13 May 1996
- Country: India
- Language: Malayalam

Aayiram Naavulla Ananthan (transl. Thousand-tongued Anandan) is a 1996 Indian Malayalam-language medical action drama film by Thulasidas starring Mammootty, Murali and Gautami.

== Plot ==
Dr. Nandakumar and Dr Anantha Padmanabhan are brothers who live with Ananthan's mother after the death of their father and Nandu's mother. Nandu marries Sridevi with whom he has a daughter while Ananthan marries Radhika. Once Nadhu was too drunk and makes a mistake with one of his patients. Later Ananthan performs surgery on the old man and saves him, creating tensions between the brothers.

== Cast ==
- Mammootty as Dr. Anantha Padmanabhan
- Murali as Dr. Nandakumar
- Gautami as Radhika
- Madhavi as Sridevi
- Devan as Idikkula Abraham
- Spadikam George as Jacob
- Sukumari as Ananthan's mother
- Vinduja Menon as Geetha
- Manianpilla Raju as Madhavan
- Sivaji as Vishwam
- Kuthiravattam Pappu as Koyakka
- C. I. Paul as O. C. Pillai
- K. B. Ganesh Kumar as Raju
- Zainuddin as Kammath
- Prathapachandran as Sridevi's father
- Sadiq as Renjith Abraham
- Philomina
- K. R. Vatsala

== Soundtrack ==
- "Naagabhooshanam" - B. Arundhathi
- "Unniyamma Chirutheyi" - K. S. Chithra
