= Bavuttiyude Namathil =

- Theatrical release poster
- Directed by: G. S. Vijayan
- Written by: Ranjith
- Produced by: Ranjith
- Starring: Mammootty; Kavya Madhavan; Shankar Ramakrishnan; Kaniha; Rima Kallingal; Vineeth
- Cinematography: Manoj Pillai
- Music by: Shahabaz Aman
- Distributed by: Seven Arts, PJ Entertainments & Tricolor Entertainments
- Release date: 21 December 2012
- Country: India
- Language: Malayalam

Bavuttiyude Namathil (transl. In the name of Bavutty) is a 2012 Malayalam-language drama thriller film produced and written by Ranjith and directed by G. S. Vijayan, starring Mammootty in the title role along with Kavya Madhavan, Shankar Ramakrishnan, Kaniha, Rima Kallingal, and Vineeth. The film was earlier titled Malabar.

With this film, G. S. Vijayan returned to directing after a hiatus of 12 years. Released on 21 December 2012, the film received mainly positive reviews and became an instant hit at the box office.

== Plot ==
Bavutty is a chauffeur in a wealthy household. He is much more than a driver and is very much a part of the family. For Sethu, his employer, life is all about making money, but Bavutty is a simple man with small dreams. Bavutty is also acting in a small-scale movie called Malabar which Vanaja, Sethu's wife, is producing.

The story takes on a twist when Vanaja's ex-lover, Satheeshan, shows up. At first, she thinks that he has come because of his poverty to seek help and tries to help him. But later, it is revealed that he has come to blackmail her and to squeeze out huge money. Satheeshan tells Vanaja that if they don't pay him 10 lakh rupees, he will tell her husband that Vanaja was already married before meeting Sethu. Bavutty tries to sell his land and give off the ransom, but his ally, Alavi, beats up Satheeshan with the help of goons. Satheeshan talks about this to Bavutty which Sethu overhears. Sethu at first decides to break up with Vanaja but Bavutty cools him down and the marriage is saved. In the end, Bavutty is seen still giving 10 lakhs to Satheeshan after selling his land and advising him to earn his bread and butter from now on and never to beg again.

== Cast ==
- Mammootty as Bavutti
- Kavya Madhavan as Vanaja
- Shankar Ramakrishnan as Sethu
- Kaniha as Mariam
- Harisree Ashokan as Alavi
- Rima Kallingal as Noorjahan
- Vineeth as Satheeshan
- Mohan Jose as S.I Josemon
- Kottayam Nazeer as Sreenivasan/Sreeni, Vanaja's elder brother
- Musthafa
- Sudheesh as Sreekandan
- Anikha as Sethu's daughter
- Mala Parvathi
- Augustine as Kunjappa Haji
- Sudheer Karamana as Constable Pavithran
- P. Balachandran as Achayan
- Lena as Sethu's friend
- Baby Raniya as Lakshmi/Lachu
- Jaseem Tirur

== Production ==
Bavuttiyude Namathil was directed by G. S. Vijayan who had been on a sabbatical for 12 years. Vijayan said, "I have been waiting for a script to make a film that is clean and that can entertain the entire family. I was delighted when Ranjith came up with the script of Bavuttiyude Namathil and decided to produce it himself."

The film started shooting on 8 September 2012 in Kozhikode. It was produced by Ranjith under the banner of Capitol Theaters. Kavya Madhavan won the Best Actress award at Asianet Film Awards.

== Reception ==
The film was released on 21 December 2012. Paresh C. Palicha of Rediff gave the film a rating of 2.5/5, saying, "Bavuttiyude Namathil is watchable at least for the performance of the three main characters." Metro Matinee gave it a positive review, calling it "a charming film that's plainly life-affirming without being overly pretentious or markedly melodramatic". India Glitz gave the film a rating of 7/10 and said that "This Bavootty is clichéd, but engrossing". Shankar Ramakrishnan won the Asianet Film Award for Best Supporting Actor for this film.
