= Pramani =

- Theatrical poster
- Directed by: B. Unnikrishnan
- Written by: B.Unnikrishnan
- Produced by: B.C.Joshy
- Starring: Mammootty; Fahadh Faasil; Siddique; Janardhanan; Sneha; Nazriya Nazim; Lakshmi
- Cinematography: Shamdat Sainudeen
- Edited by: Manoj
- Music by: M. Jayachandran
- Distributed by: Play House
- Release date: 26 March 2010
- Country: India
- Language: Malayalam

Pramani is a 2010 Indian Malayalam-language action-comedy film written and directed by B. Unnikrishnan and starring Mammootty, Fahadh Faasil, Siddique, Janardhanan, Sneha, Nazriya Nazim and Lakshmi play supporting roles in the film which also features Tamil actor Prabhu in a cameo appearance. Pramani was dubbed in Tamil as Bramma. The movie hit the theatres on 26 March 2010.

== Plot ==
Viswanatha Panicker is a corrupted Panchayat president of Thazhe Keezhppadam grama panchayath in Kuttanad for 25 years. He earns a lot of wealth through his corruption and by cornering his village people to hand over their lands to him. But he never acquires in his name, instead he gives them to his relatives. He has also been nicknamed 'America' for his tricky ways to play the big brother and thereby getting control over the issues where he gets involved. Panicker's dealings are done through his cousin brother and confidant, Somasekharan. On the other hand, Castro Vareeth is totally different man from Viswanathasa Paniker. He wants his village people to have a peaceful life.

The members of the Panchayat who work under Viswanatha Panicker are also ruthless and they are afraid of the arrival of the new Panchayat Secretary Janaki as they claim that she is very strict. On arrival, she finds out that there are so many illegal transactions and threatens that she will write to the higher authority. But, Panicker never listens to her and continue their illegal works. Somasekharan meets Bobby who is on his mission to instruct the people about the activities of Panicker and bring them to light. Soma threatens Bobby but he continues his work. Panicker later learns that Bobby is the grandson of Rosy Teacher and son of his old friend Joseph Varghese and Panicker never comes across his way.

Panicker illegally wants to sign an agreement for Cyber Park Project which needs more land for the construction of the building. Janaki is against it claiming that it is an agricultural land. But Panicker-Soma wants the agreement to be signed and Soma house-arrests Janaki along with her ailing mother while Panicker signs the agreement with a secretary for that day in place of Janaki and he controls the other members of Panchayat with the bribe. Later Rosy teacher advises him and asks him to cancel the agreement. She also recites that Panicker has got this job only because of the death of her son, Joseph and she always wanted Panicker to be honest like her son.

Panicker, on the advice of Rosy, plans to cancel the agreement but Soma and the other family members stands against him. They ask him to leave the house if he wants to cancel the agreement. Panicker leaves the house with the orphan girl, whom he claims to have seen on the train on the day of Joseph's death. Panicker starts living in the Panchayat office and Janaki feels sad for him and starts supporting him on knowing that he has changed. Panicker and Janaki go to meet the higher authority in Alapuzha to cancel the agreement, but the authority says that he had been receiving anonymous letters from the village informing that there is an illegal relationship between Janaki and Panicker. Janaki insults the authority by saying that he had time to read these letters but never had time to do his job.

Soma, who is against Panicker now, brain-washes Bobby's mind that his father Joseph's death was not an accident but a murder by Panicker to acquire the President post. Bobby, who partially believes it, asks Panicker and says that he is on his way to Trivandrum for work. Next day, Bobby's things are seen near the river and Soma claims that Panicker has killed Bobby as he came to about Panicker's true color. Rosy believes it and she slaps Panicker. Panicker recounts the story of her son Joseph that he had lurked from others for the past 25 years. He reveals that Joseph had a relationship with a lady after his marriage, fathered a daughter, and had taken him to her funeral. By accident, Joseph falls from the train during their return journey. He also says that the girl, whom he claimed to be an orphan and saw on the train, is Joseph's daughter. Panicker swears that he will bring Bobby back.

Panicker slams Soma and finds Bobby. He apologizes to the village and also to Rosy teacher and swears that he will go in a right way.

== Cast ==
- Mammootty as Viswanatha Panicker
- Fahadh Faasil as Bobby Joseph Varghese
- Siddique as Somasekhara Panicker
- Janardhanan as Castro Vareeth
- Sneha as Janaki (Voice over By Bhagyalakshmi)
- Nazriya Nazim as Sindhu
- Lakshmi as Rosy Teacher
- Prabhu as Joseph Varghese
- Suraj Venjaramoodu as Maoist Murugan
- Salim Kumar as Advocate Salim Hassan
- Baiju as CI Jeevan
- Suresh Krishna as Mangattu Vikraman
- Baburaj as Sibichan
- P. Sreekumar
- Biju Pappan as Mohandas
- Lakshmipriya as Somasekharan's Sister
- Maala Parvathi as Bobby's mother
- Sreelatha Namboothiri as Somasekharan's mother
- K. P. A. C. Lalitha as Janaki's Mother
- Anoop Menon as District Collector (Cameo)
- Kalabhavan Mani as Dancer (Cameo)
- Narayanankutty
- Chembil Ashokan
- Sivaji Guruvayoor as Minister Clement Mathai
- Priyanka Anoop
- Krishna Prabha

== Production ==
Mammootty plays the role of corrupt Panchayat President, and it was initially said that Kavya Madhavan is going to pair with Mammootty as the heroine but for unknown reasons, she backed out from the project and Sneha was named as Mammootty's lead pair. It is the third film under their combination after Thuruppu Gulan and the upcoming flick Aruvadai. Sneha plays a Panchayat Secretary in this film, who accidentally starts playing a crucial role in the life of the corrupt Panchayat President, played by Mammootty. Fahadh Faasil plays a very important role in this film after Kaiyethum Doorathu. Actor Prabhu was roped in to play a Cameo role.

The shooting of the film began on 27 December 2009. The locations of the film were in Kochi and Alappuzha.

== Soundtrack ==
The songs are composed by M. Jayachandran and lyrics are written by Gireesh Puthenchery and M. D. Rajendran.

No.	Title	Singer
1	Oru Vennila	K. J. Yesudas
2	Karakarangana	Anwar Sadat & Sudeep Kumar
3	Pramani	Anwar Sadat

== Reception ==
The film got mixed reviews from the critics and from several film reviewing sites. Paresh C Palicha of Rediff.com rated the film 2 in a scale of 5 and said, "In the final analysis, Pramaani delivers only on one promise, that being a star vehicle. In every other aspect it fails." Sify.com's reviewer said, "In all fairness, Pramani is watchable as a passé entertainer, if you are not looking forward to some nice experiments. It's an old-fashioned tale, being told in the formulaic or the clichéd style."
