= Chaatta =

Indian Malayalam film

- Directed by: Bharathan
- Written by: P. R. Nathan
- Screenplay by: P. R. Nathan
- Starring: Balan K. Nair; Nedumudi Venu; Shubha; K. P. A. C. Lalitha
- Cinematography: Vipindas
- Edited by: N. P. Suresh
- Music by: Johnson
- Production company: Chaithanyadhara
- Distributed by: Chaithanyadhara
- Release date: 5 September 1981
- Country: India
- Language: Malayalam

Chaatta is a Malayalam film directed by Bharathan in 1981. Balan K. Nair, Nedumudi Venu, Shubha and K. P. A. C. Lalitha play the main roles. Johnson composed the musical score.

== Cast ==
| Actor | Character |
|---|---|
| Nedumudi Venu | Kosra Bhairavan |
| Balan K. Nair | Chantha Velu |
| Shubha | Damayanthi |
| Achankunju | |
| K. P. A. C. Lalitha | Chandramathi (Velu's wife) |
| Philomina | Velu's mother |
| T. G. Ravi | Manikyan |
| Sandhya | Chembakam |
| Aravindakshamenon | Ravi shopkeeper |
