= T. K. Rajeev Kumar =

Indian film director

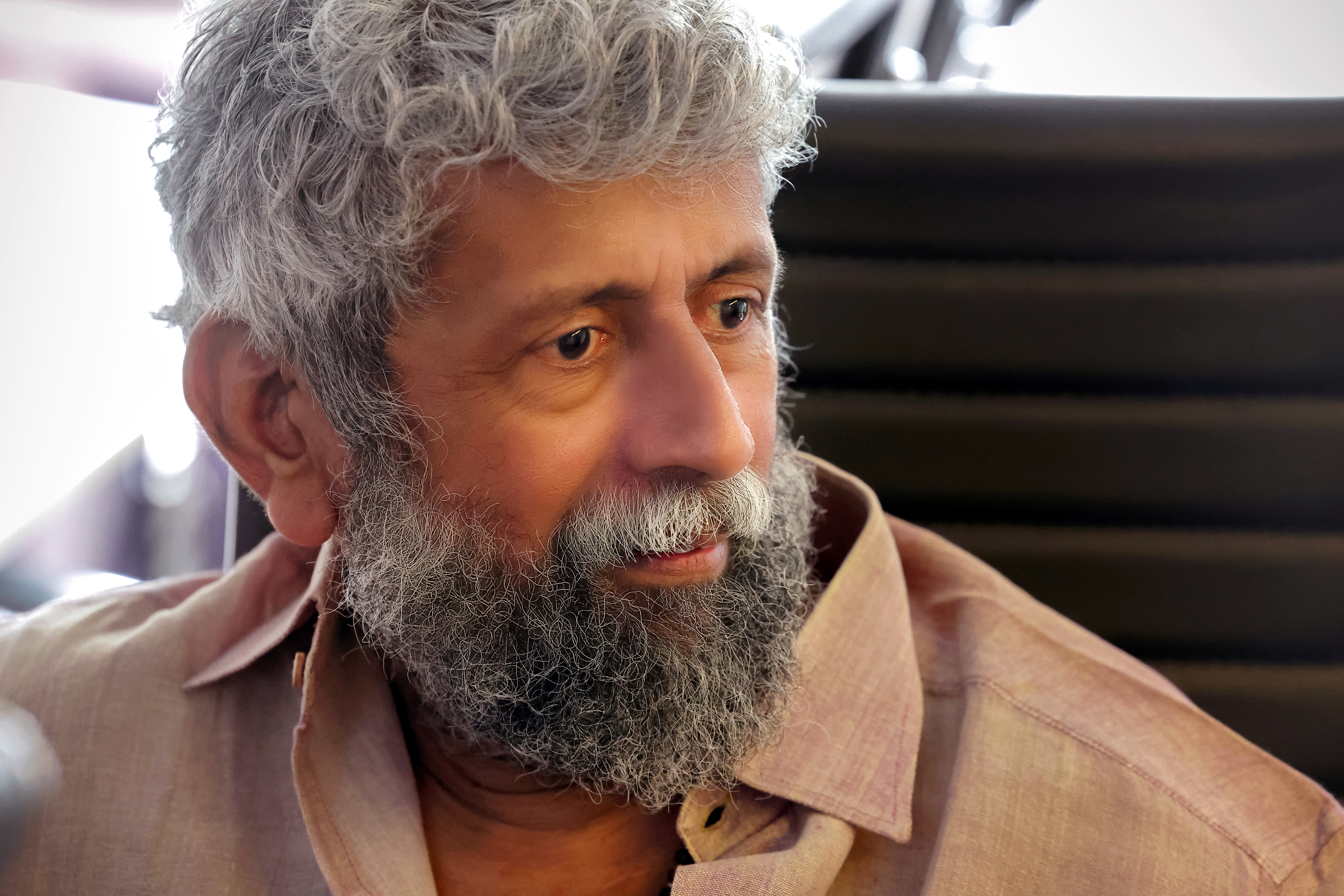
- Born: Kochu Kuttan; 20 September 1961 (age 64); Kottayam, Kerala, India
- Occupations: Film director; writer
- Years active: 1981–present
- Spouse: Latha Kurien Rajeev
- Children: Mrinal Rajeev, Kirtana Rajeev

Thazhathupurakkal Karunakara Panicker Rajeev Kumar (born 20 September 1961) is a National Award-winning Indian director of Malayalam films, from Trivandrum. He is the winner of five Kerala State Film Awards for Best Film, Director, Story Writer & Script Writer, a show director, theatre actor and percussionist (Mridangam). He is a founding member and leader of the musical band Blue Birds in 1978-79 and Super Mimics, a comedy show in 1979. He is also the Kerala University winner of Mono Act in the University Youth Festivals 1980–1982 and Kerala Sangeetha Nataka Academy winner for Mono Act 1979–1982.

== Career ==
TK Rajeev Kumar was the chairman of Kerala State Chalachitra Academy from 2003 to 2006. He was also the director of IFFK International Film Festival of Kerala from 2003 to 2006 and was the vice-chairman of Kerala State Chalachitra Academy in 2002.

== Filmography ==
=== Feature films ===
Year	Film	Language	Notes
1984	My Dear Kuttichathan	Malayalam	India's first 3D film. Worked as Assistant Director and Script Supervisor
1989	Chanakyan	Malayalam	Debut directorial venture. Kerala Film Critics Award Filmfare Award for the Best Director
1990	Kshanakkathu	Malayalam	
1991	Ottayal Pattalam	Malayalam	
1992	Mahanagaram	Malayalam	
1994	Pavithram	Malayalam	
1996	Thacholi Varghese Chekavar	Malayalam	
1999	Kannezhuthi Pottum Thottu	Malayalam	First Malayalam film to use Avid technology.
1999	Jalamarmaram	Malayalam	National Award for Best Feature Film on Environment Kerala State Award for Second Best Feature Film 2000
2000	Raja Ko Rani Se Pyar Ho Gaya	Hindi	
2001	Vakkalathu Narayanankutty	Malayalam	
2002	Sesham	Malayalam	Kerala State Award 2002 for Best Feature Film, Best Story
2004	Ivar	Malayalam	Fully shot using Steadycam
2009	Chal Chala Chal	Hindi	Remake of Malayalam film Varavelpu and scenes from Ee Parakkum Thalika.
2009	Seetha Kalyanam	Malayalam	
2010	Kushti	Hindi	Remake of Malayalam film Mutharamkunnu P.O.
2010	Oru Naal Varum	Malayalam	
2011	Rathinirvedam	Malayalam	Remake of the 1978 film of the same name
2011	Thalsamayam Oru Penkutty	Malayalam	
2013	Up & Down: Mukalil Oralundu	Malayalam	Based On Gr Indugopan's Up & Down
2019	Kolaambi	Malayalam	Selected to Indian Panorama, International Film Festival of India 2019, Goa
TBA	Bermuda †	Malayalam	Delayed
