= Thattathumala =

- Town
- Location in Kerala, India Thattathumala (India)
- Coordinates: 8.767°N 76.88°E
- Country: India
- State: Kerala
- District: Thiruvananthapuram

Government
  - Type: Government of Kerala
  - Body: Grama Panchayat

Area
  - Total: 6 km^{2} (2.3 sq mi)

Population (2001)
  - Total: 39,055
  - Density: 961/km^{2} (2,490/sq mi)

Languages
  - Official: Malayalam, English
- Time zone: UTC+5:30 (IST)
- PIN: 695614
- Telephone code: 0470
- Vehicle registration: KL 16, KL-01
- Sex ratio: 1074 ♂/♀
- The details are for pazhayakunnumme Panchayat

Thattathumala is a town in Trivandrum district of, Kerala, India. It is situated 3 km from Kilimanoor city center on the MC/SH 1 Road.

- Nearest Railway Station — Chirayankizh
- Nearest Airport - Trivandrum International Airport
