= Kizhayoor =

Village in Kerala, India

Kizhayoor is a village near Pattambi in Pattambi Taluk, Palghat District of Kerala, India, alongside the Bharathappuzha river.
