= G. S. Vijayan =

Indian film director

- Born: Trivandrum, India
- Occupation: Film Director
- Years active: 1984-present
- Spouse: Anu Vijayan

G. S. Vijayan is an Indian film director who primarily works in Malayalam. He had his debut with the Mammootty-starrer Charithram. His other films include Aanaval Mothiram and Ghoshayathra, etc.

Vijayan's had started filming an uncompleted project titled Chodhyam which had Mohanlal and Rahman . It was the remake of Tamil hit Puriyaadha Pudhir. Mohanlal' s role was played by Sarathkumar in the Tamil version. After completing the Suresh Gopi-starrer Cover Story in 2000, Vijayan did not direct a film for 12 years. He made a comeback in 2012 with Bavuttiyude Namathil starring Mammootty. The film was written and produced by Ranjith.

== Filmography ==
Film	Year	Cast	Notes
Charithram	1989	Mammootty, Rahman, Lizy, Shobana	
Chodhyam	1990	Mohanlal, Rahman, Rupini	Unreleased/Dropped Film
Aanaval Mothiram	1991	Sreenivasan, Suresh Gopi, Saranya Ponvannan, Sara	
Cheppadividya	1993	Sudheesh, Monisha, Maathu, Sreenivasan	
Ghoshayaathra	1993	Sai Kumar, Devan, Parvathy, Thilakan	
Saaphalyam	1999	Suresh Gopi, Sangita, Kalabhavan Mani, Praveena	
Cover Story	2000	Suresh Gopi, Tabu, Biju Menon, Nedumudi Venu	
The officer	2008	Kishor Satya	TV series on Amrita TV
Malakhamar	2012	Praveena	TV series on Mazhavil Manorama
Bavuttiyude Namathil	2012	Mammootty, Kavya Madhavan, Kaniha, Shankar Ramakrishnan	
