= Kshanakkathu =

- Poster
- Directed by: T. K. Rajeev Kumar
- Screenplay by: Sab John
- Produced by: George Mathew
- Starring: Niyaz Musaliyar; Athira
- Cinematography: Sunny Joseph
- Edited by: VN Raghupathi
- Music by: Sharreth
- Production company: Central Productions
- Distributed by: Central Pictures release
- Release date: 2 November 1990
- Country: India
- Language: Malayalam

Kshanakkathu is a 1990 Indian Malayalam film, directed by TK Rajeev Kumar, starring debutants Niyaz Musaliyar and Athira in the lead roles. The film was a huge box office disaster.

== Plot ==
Parvathy is a reserved girl who did her schooling from a boarding school in Ooty. On completing her studies in Ooty, she returns to her native town in Kerala to pursue her college studies. Her father is a businessman in Dubai and mother, a socially active lady who is usually away from house. She is not sure what sort of feeling she has for her mother.

Vivek and his three friends are also studying in her college, and they live nearby her house. Vivek falls for her at first sight. They fall in love with each other with the help of his friends and their tuition master. They have sex during their relationship. While coming to know about this, Parvathy’s mother requests the help of a police officer, who warns Vivek to stay away from her. But they continue to chase their dreams. So Parvathy is kept locked in her house. However, Vivek plots to elope with her. But they are stopped on the way by the tuition master, who advises them to go back for their own good. Parvathy gets admitted to the hospital after consuming poison that Vivek had bought from a pharmacy, and the police register a case against Vivek for procuring the poison for her. However, in court, Parvathy denies all false allegations against Vivek and he is set free. Parvathy is then sent to Dubai.

Things take a turn as Parvathy’s father comes to their native place and meets Vivek and his father. He hands over a letter from Parvathy to Vivek and advises him to focus on his future and build a good career. Even after that period, if their love remains, he will get them married. This is agreeable to Vivek and his father. Vivek also hands his response letter to Parvathy’s father. Vivek sends many letters to Parvathy’s Dubai address, however he does not receive anything in return. After three long months, he receives a letter from Parvathy containing her wedding invitation with another man. Upon knowing this, Vivek’s mother falls seriously ill and eventually passes away. Parvathy comes to meet Vivek, but he refuses to talk to her as he believes she is responsible for his mother’s death. Parvathy leaves, grief-ridden. Vivek’s father then confesses about the plot suggested by Parvathy’s father during his earlier visit — to collect the letters from the post office and hide them without passing them on to either of them. He fetches the bundle of envelopes, sent by Parvathy from Dubai, from inside his cupboard and hands them to Vivek. He also reveals that Vivek’s mother was aware of this. Vivek runs to meet Parvathy at their regular spot, but finds her dead in a houseboat. On seeing this, he begins driving the houseboat with Parvathy’s dead body inside, aimlessly and endlessly, as the film comes to a close.

== Cast ==
- Niyaz Musaliyar as Vivek
- Athira as Parvathy alias Pammu
- Thilakan as Vivek's Father
- Kaviyoor Ponnamma as Vivek's mother
- Nedumudi Venu as Tuition teacher
- Lakshmi as Parvathy's mother
- KP Ummer as Parvathy's father
- Philomina as Maid
- Vettukili Prakash as Vivek's friend

== Soundtrack ==
The film's soundtrack contains 5 songs (one is repeated), all composed by Sharreth, who debuted through this film, and lyrics were by Kaithapram Damodaran Namboothiri. The background score of the movie was done by Mohan Sithara.

#	Title	Singer(s)
1	"Aa Raagam Madhumayamaam"	K. J. Yesudas
2	"Aaksadeepamennum"	K. J. Yesudas, K. S. Chitra
3	"Mangalangalarulum" (M)	K. J. Yesudas
4	"Mangalangalarulum" (F)	K. S. Chitra
5	"Sallaapam Kavithayaay"	K. J. Yesudas
6	"Thaam Thakathakida Dhim"	K. J. Yesudas
