= Sharreth =

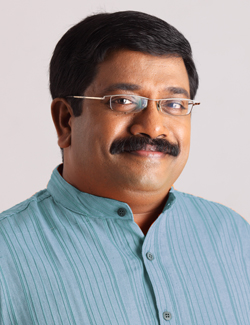

Background information
- Born: Sujith Vasudevan I 3 October 1969 (age 57)
- Origin: Kollam, Kerala, India
- Genres: Pop, classical
- Occupations: Composer; Singer
- Years active: 1985–present
- Spouse: Seetha (m. 1999)

Sujith Vasudevan I (born 3 October 1969), professionally credited as Sharreth, is an Indian music director and singer. He predominantly composes film scores and songs for Malayalam films, but has also composed many songs for the Tamil, Telugu and Hindi film industries too.

He won the Filmfare Award for the best music director in 2008. He won the Kerala State Film Award for Best Music Director in 2011 for the film Ivan Megharoopan. He was also the first recipient of the Kerala State Film Award for Best Classical Music Singer for his song Bhavayami in the film Meghatheertham. He is the son-in-law of famous music director Kannur Rajan.

== Early life ==
Born to Vasudevan Achari and Indiradevi in Kollam, Kerala, India, Sharreth is a protégé of carnatic music virtuoso M. Balamuralikrishna. He made his debut as a film composer in the 1990 Malayalam language film Kshanakkathu. Prior to debuting as a composer, Sharreth had a sporadic presence as a playback singer for films. His first song was 'Dum dum dum', a duet with K. S. Chithra for the Malayalam film Onningu Vannengil (1985).

== Personal life ==
Sharreth is married, since 19 March 1999, to Seetha Rajan, daughter of Kannur Rajan. They have a daughter, Diya, born in 2006.

== Career ==
He was one of the permanent judges of Idea Star Singer on Asianet till the end of the fifth season. From 26 September 2011, he has become a judge along with P. Jayachandran on the Amrita TV musical reality show Super Star – the Ultimate. From May 2012, he has become a judge along with Ouseppachan and S. P. Shylaja on the Kairali TV's Gandharava Sangeetham. From February 2013, he was a judge along with K. S. Chithra, Srinivas and Sujatha on the Mazhavil Manorama's singing reality show Indian Voice (season 2) and Indian Voice Junior. His memoir written by Sanjeev Pillai titled Aathmaraagam was published by Litmus Publications (an imprint of DC Books) in 2014. At present, he is one of the permanent judges of Star Singer hosted by Asianet from 2020, along with K .S Chithra, G. Venugopal, Stephen Devassy and Manjari.

== Awards ==
- 2011 – Kerala State Film Award for Best Music Director – Ivan Megharoopan
- 2009 – Kerala State Film Award for Best Classical Music Singer – "Bhavayami" from Meghatheertham
- 2008 – Filmfare Award for Best Music Director (Malayalam) – Thirakkatha
- 2008 – Mullassery Raju Music Award – Thirakkatha

== Discography ==
=== Film discography ===
Year	Title	Language	Notes
1990	Kshanakkathu	Malayalam	Debut Film
1991	Ottayal Pattalam	Malayalam	
1994	Rudraksham	Malayalam	
1994	Pavithram	Malayalam	
1994	Sagaram Sakshi	Malayalam	
1994	Vilakku Vecha Neram	Malayalam	Background Score Only
1995	Thacholi Varghese Chekavar	Malayalam	
1995	Sindoora Rekha	Malayalam	
1998	Daya	Malayalam	Background Score Only
1998	Sooryavanam	Malayalam	
1999	Devadasi	Malayalam	
2000	Ayyappantamma Neyyappam Chuttu	Malayalam	
2000	Sparsham	Malayalam	
2000	Cover Story	Malayalam	
2000	Raja Ko Rani Se Pyar Ho Gaya	Hindi	Hindi Debut; Background Score Only
2001	Vakkalathu Narayanankutty	Malayalam	Background Score Only
2001	Déjà vu	English	
2001	Achaneyanenikkishtam	Malayalam	Background Score Only
2002	Sesham	Malayalam	
2003	Magic Magic 3D	Tamil	
2005	The Campus	Malayalam	Background Score Only
2005	Kanne Madanguka	Malayalam	Background Score Only
2005	June R	Tamil	Debut Tamil Film
2006	Shyaamam	Malayalam	
2008	Thirakkatha	Malayalam	Filmfare Award for Best Music Director – Malayalam
2008	Kamasutra Nights	English	Music Director
2009	Kalavaramaye Madilo	Telugu	Debut Telugu Film
2009	Chal Chala Chal	Hindi	Background Score Only.
2009	Paleri Manikyam	Malayalam	
2009	Meghatheertham	Malayalam	First recipient of Kerala State Film Award for Best Classical Music Singer for his song Bhavayami.
2010	Pulliman	Malayalam	
2010	Nalla Pattukare	Malayalam	
2010	Kanyakumari Express	Malayalam	
2010	Orange	Malayalam	Background Score Only
2010	Kushti	Hindi	Background Score Only
2011	180	Tamil / Telugu	
2012	Thalsamayam Oru Penkutty	Malayalam	
2012	Ivan Megharoopan	Malayalam	Kerala State Film Award for Best Music Director
2012	Kanneerinu Madhuram	Malayalam	
2013	Ente	Malayalam	
2013	Naa Bangaaru Talli	Telugu	
2013	The Reporter	Malayalam	
2014	Kathai Thiraikathai Vasanam Iyakkam	Tamil	Guest Composer.
2014	Drushyam	Telugu	
2017	Hadiyya	Malayalam	
2018	Naa Nuvve	Telugu	
2018	Parole	Malayalam	
2018	Autorsha	Malayalam	
2018	Neeli	Malayalam	
2020	Shyamaragam	Malayalam	Background Score
2024	DNA	Malayalam	
2026	Kadhal Kadhai Sollava	Tamil	1 song only

=== Independent album discography ===
- Sangeetha Paravai (Tamil)
- Chitra Pournami (1994)
- Sarana Manthram (1994)
- Chaithra Geethangal (1997)
- Pasupathaasthram -Sree Kadampuzha Bhagavathi (1997)
- Gopeechandanam – Guruvayoorpuran Songs (1999)
- Onappoovu (1999)
- Gurudevan (2001)
- Veendum (2003)
- Sree Gananaatham (2008)
- Devapampa (2009)
- Sasthavu (2010)
- Strawberry Theyyam (2014)
- Njanappana (ART OF LIVING (2014)
- Pahimam Padmanabha (2015)
- Green Symphony (2015)
- Paavana Pamba (2016)
- Madhumasa mazha (Ronima Creations) (2022)

=== As singer ===
Year	Film	Co-singer(s)	Music director	Song
1985	Onningu Vannenkil	K. S. Chithra	Shyam	Dum dum dum swaramelam
1986	Ice Cream	Cochin Ibrahim	Johnson	Premamennaalenthu
1990	His Highness Abdullah	K. J. Yesudas, M. G. Sreekumar, Raveendran	Raveendran	Devasabhathalam
1995	Sindoora Rekha		Sharreth	Paahiraama Prabhu
1995	Thacholi Varghese Chekavar	Srinivas	Sharreth	Veeraalipattin
1997	Aaraam Thampuran	K. J. Yesudas	Raveendran	Sandatham
1999	Devadasi	G. Venugopal	Sharath	Namasthesthu
1999	Devadasi		Sharath	Paaraalum Maalore
1999	Devadasi	K. S. Chithra	Sharreth	Yamuna Nadhiyozhukum
2000	Cover Story	M. G. Sreekumar, K. S. Chithra	Sharreth	Ini Maanathum
2000	Sparsham		Sharreth	Pandenno Kettathaane
2000	Sparsham		Sharreth	Thengi Mounam
2002	Shesham		Sharreth	Ethetho
2003	Nala Damayanthi		Ramesh Vinayagam	Pei Muzhi [Tamil song]
2005	June R		Sharreth	Eano Eano [Tamil song]
2006	Kalabham	K. J. Yesudas, K. Krishnakumar	Raveendran	Varoo Varoo
2008	Thirakkatha		Sharreth	Oduviloru
2009	Meghatheertham	K. S. Chithra	Sharreth	Mazhayaal
2009	Meghatheertham		Sharreth	Bhavayaami. Kerala State Film Award for Best classical singer
2009	Meghatheertham		Sharreth	Dhyanam Kondu
2009	Paleri Manikyam	Hariharan	Sharreth	Tum Jo Mujh Mein
2009	Seetha Kalyanam	Madhu Balakrishnan, Karthik, Anuradha Sriram	Srinivas	Seetharaamam
2010	Kadaksham		M. Jayachandran	Omanapennalle
2010	Pulliman		Traditional Folk	Aanandam
2010	Kadhalar Kudiyirippu	Priya Hemesh	James Vasanthan	Kodi Kodi Aasaikal [Tamil song]
2010	Kadhaksham	Solo	M. Jayachandran	Omana pennllayo
2011	180		Sharreth	Niyayam Thaana [Tamil song]
2011	Pranayam		M. Jayachandran	Kalamozhi
2012	Ivan Megharoopan	K.S.Chithra	Sharreth	Vishukili
2013	Ente	Solo	Sharreth	Engengo
2013	The Reporter	Solo	Sharreth	Karukkal Nirathi
2013	The Reporter	Solo	Sharreth	Vaarmthiye
2014	Ulavacharu Biryani	Solo	Ilaiyaraaja	Raayaleni Lekhane [Telugu song]
2014	Oggarane	Solo	Ilaiyaraaja	Bareyada Saalanu [Kannada song]
2014	Drishya	Solo	Ilaiyaraaja	Devare Kelu [Kannada song][Remake of Drishyam Malayalam movie]
2014	Nadan		Ouseppachan	Sargavedhikale
2014	Varsham	Solo	Bijibal	Karimukilukal
2015	Touring Talkies	Anitha Karthikeyan	Ilaiyaraaja	Nenju Porukuthilayae [Tamil song]
2015	Touring Talkies	Solo	Ilaiyaraaja	Kathirunthaen [Tamil song]
2015	Kida Poosari Magudi	Solo	Ilaiyaraaja	Intha Kaalathile [Tamil song]
2015	Kanal	Solo	Ouseppachan	Maaya Nagarame
2015	Tharai Thappattai	Solo	Ilaiyaraaja	Idarinum [Tamil song]
2018	Naa... Nuvve	Solo	Sharreth	Premika [Telugu Song]
2018	Thamizh Padam 2	Vijay Prakash	N Kannan	En Nadanam [Tamil song]
2022	Sita Ramam	Nithya Mammen	Vishal Chandrashekhar	Pen Poove Thenvande

=== As dubbing artist ===
Year	Film	Actor	Notes
2010	Chutti Chathan	Kottarakkara Sreedharan Nair	Dubbed for its 2010 re-released version in Tamil

== Television ==
- All are Malayalam shows unless noted

As Judge

year	Program	Channel	Notes
2007	Idea Star Singer 2007	Asianet	
2008	Idea Star Singer 2008	Asianet	
2009-2010	Idea Star Singer Season 4	Asianet	
2009	Zee Tamil Sa Re Ga Ma Pa 2009 Challenge	Zee Tamil	Tamil show
2010-2011	Idea Star Singer Season 5	Asianet	
2012	Gandharva Sangeetham	Kairali TV	
2013	Super star the ultimate	Amrita TV	
2013	Josco Indian voice season 2	Mazhavil Manorama	
2013	Candyman Indian Voice Junior	Mazhavil Manorama	
2014	Super Star	Amrita TV	
2015	Bhima Indian Music League	Flowers TV	
2016	Super Star Junior	Amrita TV	
2018	Super 4	Mazhavil Manorama	
2019	Paadaam Namuk Paadam	Mazhavil Manorama	
2020–2022	Star Singer Season 8	Asianet	
2022-2023	top singer 3	flowers TV	
2023- 2024	top singer 4	flowers TV	

== Concerts ==
In 2024, K. S. Chithra headlined the Chithra Varnam concert on May 11th at the Chabot Performing Arts Center, Hayward, California. Organized by Kalalaya sponsored by Nambiar Builders, the event featured her signature melodies across multiple Indian languages, with support from musicians such as Sharreth and K. K. Nishad. The concert celebrated Mother's Day, adding a sentimental note to the evening.
