= G. Venugopal =

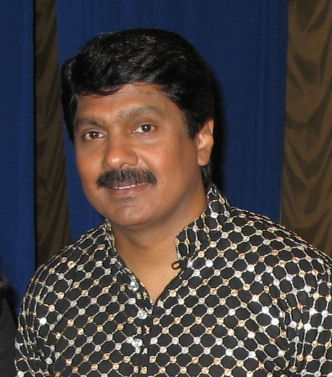
- Born: Gopinathan Nair Venugopal; 10 December 1960 (age 65); Thattathumala, Thiruvananthapuram district, Kerala, India
- Education: University of Kerala
- Occupations: Singer; journalist; composer; television presenter; social activist
- Years active: 1984–present
- Spouse: Reshmi (m. 1990)
- Children: 2, including Arvind Venugopal
- Relatives: Sujatha Mohan (cousin); Radhika Thilak (cousin); Shweta Mohan (niece)
- Musical career
- Genres: Indian classical music; Playback singing; Filmi
- Instrument: Vocals
- Labels: Manorama Music; Satyam Audios
- Website: gvenugopal.com

Gopinathan Nair Venugopal (born 10 December 1960), popularly known as G. Venugopal, is an Indian playback singer known for his works in Malayalam films. He started his singing career in the film Odaruthammava Aalariyam (1984). Since then he has sung in more than 400 films; and has over 500 private albums to his credit.

== Early and personal life ==
Venugopal was born in Thattathumala, near Kilimanoor. He is the elder of the two children of Gopinathan Nair, who hails from Thattathumala, and Sarojini, who was the head of the department of music, Government College for Women, Thiruvananthapuram. K. Sharadamani and K. Radhamani, who were popularly known as Parur sisters, are Venugopal's maternal aunts. Singers Sujatha Mohan and Radhika Thilak are his cousins and Shweta Mohan is his niece.

Venugopal married Reshmi on 8 April 1990. They have two children, Arvind and Anupallavi. Arvind is also a playback singer.

== Popular works ==
Year	Song title	Film	Music director	Lyricist
1985	Poomaname	Nirakkoottu	Shyam	Poovachal Khader
1986	Raree rareeram raroo	Onnu Muthal Poojyam Vare	Mohan Sithara	ONV
1986	Ponnum thinkal pottum Mane	Onnu Muthal Poojyam Vare	Mohan Sithara	ONV
1987	Onnaam raagam paadi	Thoovanathumbikal	Perumbavoor G. Raveendranath	Sreekumaran Thampi
1988	Chandanamanivathil	Marikunilla Njaan	Raveendran	Ezhacheri Ramachandran
1988	Kaanaanazhakulla maanikyakuyile	Oozham	M. K. Arjunan	ONV
1988	Manasse shaanthamaaku	Aalilakkuruvikal	Mohan Sithara	Bichu Thirumala
1988	Unarumee gaanam	Moonam Pakkam	Ilayaraja	Sreekumaran Thampi
1989	Pallitherundo	Mazhavilkkaavadi	Johnson	Kaithapram Damodaran Namboothiri
1990	Swargangal Swapnam Kaanum	Maalooty	Johnson	Pazhavila Ramesan
1990	Thaane Poovitta Moham	Sasneham	Johnson	
1990	Thooval vinnin maaril chaarthi	Thalayanamanthram	Johnson	
1991	Etho varmukilin	Pookalam Varavayi	Ouseppachan	
1991	Maayaamanchalil	Ottayaal Pattalam	Sharreth	
1991	Thumbapu kodiyuduthu	Sandesham	Johnson	
1993	Karuka vavayal kuruvi	Dhruvam	S. P. Venkatesh	
1994	Geeton Mein	Tu Hi Mera Dil	A R Rahman	
1997	Gurucharanam sharanam	Guru	Ilayaraja	
2003	Thamara Noolinal	Mullavalliyum Thenmavum	Ouseppachan	
2006	Kai nirayai venna taraam	Baba Kalyani	Alex Paul	
2006	Kando Kando	Mahasamudram	Jayachandran	Kaithapram Damodaran Namboothiri

== Television shows ==
As Judge

Year	Title	Channel	Notes
2008	Idea star singer 2008	Asianet	
2008-2009	Munch Star singer Junior	Asianet	
2010-2012	Munch Star singer Junior season 2	Asianet	
2015	Raree rareeram raro season2	Asianet Plus	
2015	Pathinalam ravu season 2	Media One	
2020–2022	Star Singer Season 8	Asianet	
2023-	Musical Wife Grand Finale	Flowers TV	

TV series

- 2023: Shyamambaram (Zee Keralam)

== Awards ==
Kerala State Film Awards

- 1988 - Best Male Playback Singer - Unarumee Gaanam (Moonnam Pakkam)
- 1990 - Best Male Playback Singer - Thaane Poovitta Moham (Sasneham)
- 2004 - Best Male Playback Singer - Aadadi Aadaadadi (Ullam)

Kerala Film Critics Association Awards

- 1987 - Best Male Playback Singer - Onnam Ragam Paadi (Thoovanathumbikal)
- 1989 - Best Male Playback Singer - Mainaka Ponmudiyil (Mazhavilkavadi)

Asianet Film Awards

- 2006 - Best Playback Singer (Male) - Kainiraye (Baba Kalyani)

Other awards

- 2014 - Honoured by Uthradom Thirunal Marthanda Varma Foundation for completing 30 years in the music industry.
- 2022 - Golden Voice Award by Mazhavil Music Awards
- 2022 - Janmashtami Award by Balagokulam for contributions in art and culture of Kairali. He is the youngest to receive this award.
