= List of Malayalam films of 1987 =

The following is a list of Malayalam films released in the year 1987.

Opening		Film	Cast	Director	Music director	Notes
J A N	2	Janangalude Shradhakku	Nedumudi Venu, Nilambur Balan	Beypore Mani	Beypore Mani	
J A N	3	Ezhuthapurangal	Suhasini Mani Ratnam, Ambika	Sibi Malayil	Johnson	
J A N	9	Amme Bhagavathi	Shankar, Menaka	Sreekumaran Thampi	M. S. Viswanathan	
J A N	9	Neela Kurinji Poothappol	Karthika, Sreenivasan	Bharathan	Jerry Amaldev	
J A N	16	Kathakku Pinnil	Mammootty, Devi Lalitha	K. G. George	Ouseppachan	
J A N	16	Kurukkan Rajavayi	Mukesh, Maniyanpilla Raju	P. Chandrakumar	A. T. Ummer	
J A N	23	January Oru Orma	Mohanlal, Karthika	Joshiy	Ouseppachan	
J A N	23	Amrutham Gamaya	Mohanlal, Thilakan	T. Hariharan	M. B. Sreenivasan	
J A N	24	Kottum Kuravayum	Sukumari, Mammootty	Alleppey Ashraf	Raghu Kumar	
F E B	7	Swargam	Jagathy Sreekumar, Mukesh	Unni Aranmula	Gopan	
F E B	7	Oru Sindoora Pottinte Ormaykku	Mammootty, Urvashi	Cochin Haneefa	Shyam	
F E B	12	Sreedharante Onnam Thirumurivu	Mammootty, Neena Kurup	Sathyan Anthikad	Shyam	
F E B	12	Ithrayum Kaalam	Madhu, Mammootty	I. V. Sasi	Shyam	
F E B	12	Theertham	Nedumudi Venu, Pallavi Joshi	Mohan	Bombay Ravi	
F E B	12	Vilambaram	Sukumari, Thilakan	Balachandra Menon	S. P. Venkatesh	
F E B	18	Yaagagni	Suresh Gopi, Rohini	P. Chandrakumar	A. T. Ummer	
F E B	18	Ivide Ellavarkkum Sukham	Mohanlal, Jagathy Sreekumar	Jeassy	G. Devarajan	
F E B	18	Jaithra Yaathra	Kakka Ravi, Shari	J. Sasikumar	Shyam	
F E B	20	Aalippazhangal	Sukumari, Thilakan	Ramachandran Pillai	Darsan Raman	
M A R	2	Oru Minnaminunginte Nurunguvettam	Nedumudi Venu, Sharada	Bharathan	Johnson	
M A R	10	Kaalathinte Sabhdam	Ratheesh, Shari	Asha Khan	S. P. Venkatesh	
M A R	13	Manja Manthrangal	Jayabharathi, Mukesh	A. Chandrasekharan	Jerry Amaldev	
M A R	17	Sruthi	Mukesh, Thilakan	Mohan	Johnson	
M A R	19	Penn Simham	Ratheesh, Anuradha	Crossbelt Mani	Guna Singh	
M A R	20	Verukal Thedi	Madhavi, Vishnuvardhan	Somasekharan	Sathyam	
M A R	20	Neeyethra Dhanya	Karthika, Murali	Jeassy	G. Devarajan	
M A R	20	Ithente Neethi	Shankar, Jose	J. Sasikumar	Johnson	
M A R	20	Neeyallengil Njan	Jagathy Sreekumar, Sindhu	Radhakrishnan		
M A R	21	Thoranam	Nedumudi Venu, Yamuna	Joseph Madappally	G. Devarajan	
M A R	27	Dheeran	Ratheesh, Unnimary	K. S. Gopalakrishnan	A. T. Ummer	
A P R	9	Kaala Rathri	Jagathy Sreekumar, Sathaar	K. S. Gopalakrishnan	A. T. Ummer	
A P R	9	Rithubhedam	Balachandra Menon, Thilakan	Prathap Pothen	Shyam	
A P R	9	Nombarathi Poovu	Madhavi, Sonia	P. Padmarajan	M. G. Radhakrishnan	
A P R	10	Adimakal Udamakal	Mohanlal, Mammootty	I. V. Sasi	Shyam	
A P R	14	Kanikanum Neram	Sunitha, Nedumudi Venu, Ratheesh, Vineeth, Saritha	Rajasenan	A. T. Ummer	
A P R	16	Idanazhiyil Oru Kaalocha	Karthika, Vineeth	Bhadran	V. Dakshinamoorthy	
A P R	21	Sarvakalashala	Mohanlal, Jagathi Sreekumar	Venu Nagavalli	M. G. Radhakrishnan	
M A Y	2	Manasa Maine Varu	K. B. Ganesh Kumarsaritha innocent	p ramu	Shankar–Ganesh	
M A Y	6	Nadodikkattu	Mohanlal, Sreenivasan	Sathyan Anthikkad	Shyam	
M A Y	8	Athinumappuram	Mammootty, Jagathy Sreekumar	Thevalakkara Chellappan	Johnson	
M A Y	15	Itha Samayamayi	Jagathy Sreekumar, Ratheesh	P. G. Vishwambharan	Shyam	
M A Y	15	Irupatham Noottandu	Mohanlal, Suresh Gopi	K. Madhu	Shyam	
M A Y	22	Vrutham	Kamal Haasan, Geetha	I. V. Sasi	Shyam	
M A Y	22	P.C. 369	Suresh Gopi, Mukesh	P. Chandrakumar	K. P. N. Pillai	
M A Y	29	Ajantha	Shankar, Jagannatha Varma	Manoj Babu	Joy Anand	
M A Y	29	Oridathu	Nedumudi Venu, Sreenivasan	G. Aravindan	Hariprasad Chaurasia	
M A Y	29	Kaalam Maari Kadha Maari	Mammootty, Shobhana	M. Krishnan Nair		
J U N	5	Ponnu	Jagathy Sreekumar, Innocent	P. G. Vishwambharan	Ouseppachan	
J U N	7	Jungle Boy	Pattom Sadan, Irfan	P. Chandrakumar	S. P. Venkatesh	
J U N	8	Cheppu	Mohanlal, Cochin Haneefa	Priyadarshan	Reghu Kumar	
J U N	11	Varshangal Poyathariyathe	Sukumari, Innocent	Mohan Roop	Mohan Sithara	
J U N	19	Bhoomiyile Rajakkanmar	Mohanlal, Adoor Bhasi	Thampi Kannanthanam	S. P. Venkatesh	
J U N	19	Vamban	Ratheesh, Rohini	Hassan	A. T. Ummer	
J U N	25	Kilippattu	Adoor Bhasi, Nedumudi Venu	Raghavan	M. B. Sreenivasan	
J U L	4	Four Plus Four		Jacob Breeze	Guna Singh	
J U L	4	Unnikale Oru Kadha Parayam	Mohanlal, Thilakan	Kamal	Ouseppachan	
J U L	4	Aids	Prathapachandran, M. G. Soman	V. P. Mohammed		
J U L	7	ankakkaLari		muralidharan		
J U L	8	Aadyarathrikku Munbu	devan	vijayan karott	G. Devarajan	
J U L	12	Aattakatha	Sukumari, Jagathy Sreekumar	J. Williams	Raghu Kumar	
J U L	12	Jaalakam	Sukumari, Srividya	Harikumar	M. G. Radhakrishnan	
J U L	24	Nirabhedhangal	Sunitha, Prathap Pothen, Sankaradi, Geetha, Ambika	Sajan	Shyam	
J U L	24	New Delhi	Mammootty, Sumalatha	Joshiy	Shyam	
J U L	31	Thoovanathumbikal	Mohanlal, Sumalatha	P. Padmarajan	Perumbavoor G. Raveendranath	
A U G	4	Ivare Sookshikkuka	Adoor Bhasi, Ratheesh	Mohan Roop	Guna Singh	
A U G	5	Uppu	P. T. Kunju Muhammed, Jayalalita	V. K. Pavithran	Saratchandra Marathe	
A U G	6	Agni Muhurtham	Urvashi, Ratheesh	Soman	S. P. Venkatesh	
A U G	14	Thaniyavarthanam	Mammootty, Saritha	Sibi Malayil	M. G. Radhakrishnan	
A U G	14	Kaiyethum Doorathu	Mohanlal, Nedumudi Venu	K. Ramachandran	M. S. Viswanathan	
A U G	21	Theekattu	Jagathy Sreekumar, Ratheesh	Joseph Vattoli	Murali Sithara	
A U G	28	Naradhan Keralathil	Jagathy Sreekumar, Mukesh	Crossbelt Mani	M. K. Arjunan	
A U G	28	Vaiki Odunna Vandi	Nalini	P. K. Radhakrishnan	Raveendran	
A U G	28	Vazhiyorakazchakal	Mohanlal, Ratheesh	Thampi Kannanthanam	S. P. Venkatesh	
S E P	4	Avalude Katha	Sathaar, Anuradha	Jayadevan	A. T. Ummer	
S E P	4	Swathi Thirunal	Anant Nag, Srividya	Lenin Rajendran	M. B. Sreenivasan	
S E P	4	Manivathoorile Aayiram Sivarathrikal	Mammootty, Suhasini	Fazil	M. B. Sreenivasan	
S E P	4	Achuvettante Veedu	Nedumudi Venu, Rohini Hattangadi	Balachandra Menon	Vidyadharan	
S E P	4	Veendum Lisa	Innocent, Babu Antony	Baby	Raghu Kumar	
S E P	4	Aankiliyude Tharattu	Mammootty, Revathi	Cochin Haneefa	Shyam	
S E P	6	Ee Nootandile Maha Rogam	Captain Raju, Anuradha	N. Sankaran Nair		
O C T	1	Anantharam	Mammootty, Ashokan	Adoor Gopalakrishnan	M. B. Sreenivasan	
N O V	2	Samarappanam	Shubha, Ambika	Vijay Anand	Vijay Anand	
N O V	27	Oru Maymasa Pulariyil	Balachandra Menon, Murali	V. R. Gopinath	Raveendran	
N O V	27	Naalkavala	Mammootty, Shobhana	I. V. Sasi	Shyam	
D E C	5	Ellaavarkkum Nanmakal	innocent, soman	T. K. Balachandran	A. T. Ummer	
D E C	9	Chanthayil Choodi Vilkkunna Pennu	Kuthiravattam Pappu,Mala Aravindan	vijayan karott	vidyadharan	
D E C	25	Onnaam Maanam Poomaanam	Venu Nagavally, Shankar	Sandhya Mohan	Johnson	
unknown	unknown	Mangalya Charthu	soman, Vani Viswanath	gauthaman	K. V. Mahadevan	

== Dubbed films ==
film	Direction	Story	Screenplay	Main actors
Aadhyate Anubhavam	Kashinath			
Anga Kalari	Muralidharan			
Ladies Tailor	Vamshi			
Pushpaka Vimanam	Singitham Srinivasa Rao			
Swaralayam	K. Viswanath			
Criminals				
Njanum Neeyum	Hariharan			
Mrugashaalayil	Rajan–Nagendra			
