= Kalikaalam (2012 film) =

- Directed by: Reji Nair
- Written by: Reji Nair
- Produced by: Pilakandi Mohammed Ali
- Starring: Sharada; Satthya; Lalu Alex; Ashokan; Suresh Krishna; Shari; Lakshmi Sharma; Mamukkoya; Kozhikode Narayanan Nair; Sreehari
- Cinematography: Madhu Ambat
- Edited by: Ranjan Abraham
- Music by: Ousepachan
- Production company: Pilakandi Films International
- Release date: 15 June 2012
- Country: India
- Language: Malayalam

Kalikaalam (Malayalam: കലികാലം) is a 2012 Malayalam drama film written and directed by Reji Nair. Focussing mainly on relationships, it tells the story of a mother and her three children. The film tries to explore the complexities of a small family. Scriptwriter Reji Nair makes his directorial debut with this film. Kalikalam was filmed by award-winning cinematographer Madhu Ambat. The film's music is by O. N. V. Kurup-Ousepachan team, who reunites once again after Akashadoothu (1992). The film was shot in Thalassery and nearby places.

== Plot synopsis ==
The story is about Devaki, an active social reformer, who works as a teacher and mother of three children. The film deals with human relationships and explores the complexities that are generally faced in the life of a small family.

== Cast ==
- Sharada as Devaki Teacher
- Lalu Alex as Satheesh Nair
- Ashokan as Ravi Nair
- Satthya
- Suresh Krishna as Gouthaman Nair
- Shari as Meenakshi
- Leona Lishoy as Ananya
- Sadhika Venugopal as Shelly
- J. Pallassery as Pilla
- Bheeman Raghu as C.I Chandran Nair
- Sadhika Venugopal as Shelly
- Lakshmi Sharma as Suja Gouthaman
- Mamukkoya as Mohammed Koya Master
- Kulappulli Leela as Nani
- Kozhikode Narayanan Nair as Rajan Master
- Sreehari as Raghavan Nair
- Munshi Venu as Usman Master
- Anoop Chandran as Keshavan
- Sathaar as Dr.Krishnadas
- Parvathi T. as Dr.Shoshamma Kuriyan

== Soundtrack ==
Music was composed by Ousepachan and the lyrics were written by O. N. V. Kurup.

Track listing
No.	Title	Singer(s)	Length
1.	"Mutharamkunnin"	K. S. Chithra	4:28
2.	"Pranayamoranandha"	Jayachandran	5:28
3.	"Thoovellikasavulla"	Shreya Ghoshal	5:54
4.	"Amme"	K. J. Yesudas	4:30
5.	"Pranayamoranandha (F)"	Rajalakshmy	5:27
