= Snehdeep Singh Kalsi =

- Born: Mumbai, Maharashtra, India
- Occupations: Singer-songwriter; musician

Snehdeep Singh Kalsi is a Mumbai-based Indian singer known for his multilingual rendition of the popular song "Kesariya" from the 2022 Bollywood film Brahmastra. Kalsi's version of "Kesariya" featured performances in five different languages: Hindi, Telugu, Tamil, Kannada, and Malayalam. This display of linguistic and musical versatility was praised for its flawless pronunciation and cultural sensitivity.

== Early life and background ==
Snehdeep Singh Kalsi was born and raised in Mumbai, India. He completed his education in Ahmedabad, Gujarat, where he attended the Charusat University's Chandubhai S. Patel Institute of Technology (CSPIT). He earned a Bachelor of Technology (B.Tech.) degree from CSPIT. After completing his undergraduate studies, Kalsi relocated to Bengaluru to pursue a Master of Business Administration (MBA) in Marketing at the Symbiosis Institute of Business Management.

== Musical career ==
=== Breakthrough with "Kesariya" ===
Kalsi's breakthrough came with his rendition of "Kesariya," which garnered widespread attention when it was released online. The over-a-minute video of him singing the song in five different languages went viral on social media, earning him accolades from audiences and prominent figures. Prime Minister Narendra Modi praised the performance, describing it as a "great manifestation of the spirit of ‘Ek Bharat, Shreshtha Bharat’." Industrialist Anand Mahindra also commended the rendition, highlighting it as an example of a united India.

The multilingual version of "Kesariya" was widely covered by various major media outlets in India, including India Today, NDTV, The Times of India, and Hindustan Times, among others.

=== "Shuru Karein? with Snehdeep Singh Kalsi" ===
Following the success of "Kesariya," Snehdeep Singh Kalsi embarked on a musical tour titled "Shuru Karein? with Snehdeep Singh Kalsi." The tour included performances in four major Indian cities, where Kalsi delivered a blend of classical tunes, ghazals, Sufi music, and popular songs, paying homage to legendary artists like Nusrat Fateh Ali Khan and Ghulam Ali.

=== "Pyaar Ki Talaash Mein" ===
In 2025, Snehdeep made his debut with Saregama Music through the release of his original single Pyaar Ki Talaash Mein.

=== Public engagement ===
Snehdeep Singh Kalsi performed at Kommune's Spoken Fest in Mumbai in February 2025. He also delivered two shows of Ishq Ka Dariya at NCPA @The Park, showcasing his signature blend of classical and contemporary music.

== Recognition and Impact ==
Kalsi's ability to sing fluently in multiple languages has been celebrated as a symbol of India's linguistic diversity and unity. His work has been recognized for promoting cultural integration and fostering a sense of national pride.

== Discography ==
Year	Song name	Ref.
2025	"Yeh Naazuk Se Rishtey"	
2025	"Pyaar Ki Talaash"	
2023	"Kesariya - Multilingual Mix"	
