= Leona Lishoy =

Indian actress and model

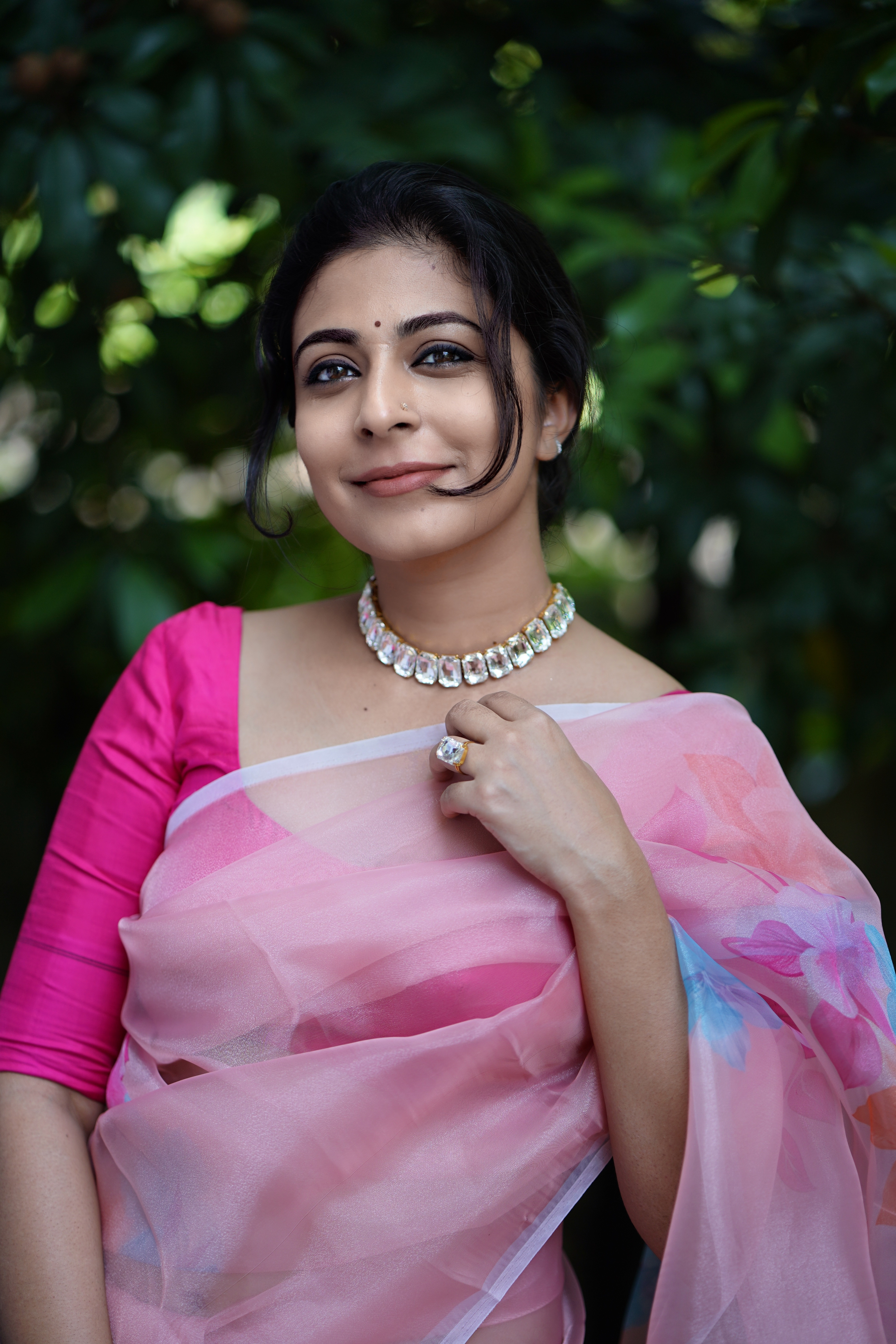
- Born: 26 April 1991 (age 35); Thrissur, Kerala, India
- Occupations: Actress; Model
- Years active: 2012–present
- Parent: Lishoy

Leona Lishoy (born 26 April 1991) is an Indian actress and model who works primarily in Malayalam films. She is the daughter of Malayalam actor Lishoy.

== Early life ==
Leona was born in Thrissur, Kerala, on 26 April 1991, as the daughter of film and television actor Lishoy. She studied at Hari Sri Vidya Nidhi School, Thrissur. She then graduated from Christ University, Bengaluru, and went on to receive an MBA diploma from Symbiosis Institute of Business Management, Bengaluru.

== Career ==
Leona started off as a model for various advertisements. She was subsequently signed on to play the role of Sharada's daughter in '-Kalikaalam (2012). Her first substantial role was in Jawan of Vellimala, starring Mammootty, Mamtha Mohandas in which she played Asif Ali's love interest in 2012.

In 2013, she played the female lead in science fiction movie Red Rain, which had an international cast and crew.

She was also seen in cameo roles in North 24 Kaatham and Haram, both of which starred Fahadh Faasil in the lead. Leona essayed a serious role as Dr. Treesa, the mother of Sara Arjun in Annmariya Kalippilannu in 2016.

Leona also signed on to play an orphan in a Yatheemkhana (Muslim orphanage) in Hadiyya (2017).

She expanded her repertoire with notable performances in Viswasapoorvam Mansoor (2017), Maradona (2018), Queen (2018) and Athiran (2019).

Her performance as Sameera, a movie actress in the movie Mayanadi was widely accepted. Leona played the role of Mariya in the thriller-drama Ishq, starring Ann Sheetal and Shane Nigam.

In Prasobh Vijayan's Anveshanam (2020), Leona starred alongside Jayasurya and Shruti Ramachandran. She received widespread acclaim for her nuanced portrayal of a police officer.

== Filmography ==
=== Films ===
- Note: all films are in Malayalam, unless otherwise noted.

| Year | Title | Role | Notes | Ref. |
|---|---|---|---|---|
| 2012 | Kalikaalam | Ananya | | |
| 2012 | Jawan of Vellimala | Jenny Varghese | | |
| 2013 | North 24 Kaatham | Simi | | |
| 2013 | Red Rain | Neha | | |
| 2015 | Haram | Isha's friend | | |
| 2015 | Onnum Onnum Moonu | Vivek's lover | Segment: Shabdharekha | |
| 2015 | Mr. Premi | | | |
| 2016 | Annmariya Kalippilannu | Dr. Teresa Roy | | |
| 2016 | Zoom | Model Girly Zacharia | | |
| 2016 | Mukhapadangal | | | |
| 2017 | Gemini | Mithila | | |
| 2017 | Viswasapoorvam Mansoor | Soumya | | |
| 2017 | History of Joy | Aparna | | |
| 2017 | Hadeeya | Khadeeja | | |
| 2017 | Mayanadi | Sameera | | |
| 2018 | Queen | Victim/Witness | Cameo appearance | |
| 2018 | Kidu | Annie | | |
| 2018 | Maradona | Nadhiya | | |
| 2018 | Mangalyam Thanthunanena | Susan Thomas | | |
| 2018 | Ennaalum Sarath..? | Haseeba | Photo presence | |
| 2019 | Edhureetha | Raghavi | Telugu film | |
| 2019 | Athiran | Annamaria | | |
| 2019 | Ishq: Not A Love Story | Mariya | Nominated : 9th South Indian International Movie Awards - Best Supporting Actress | |
| 2019 | Virus | Mrs. Paul | | |
| 2020 | Anveshanam | ACP Latha | | |
| 2020 | Kattu Kadal Athirukal | Abida Hassan | | |
| 2021 | Ishq: Not A Love Story | Jyothi | Telugu film | |
| 2022 | Twenty One Gms | Gouri Nandhakishore | | |
| 2022 | 12th Man | Fida | | |
| 2022 | Varayan | Daisy | | |
| 2022 | Chathuram | CI Meritta Philip | | |
| 2023 | Djinn | Thara Koshi | | |
| 2024 | Samadhana Pusthakam | Sheena Antony | | |
| 2024 | Kanakarajyam | Devu | | |
| 2024 | Agathokakalogical | Nisha | | |
| 2026 | Valathu Vashathe Kallan | ASI Vidhya Shekar | | |
| 2026 | 29 | Rukmini | Tamil film | |
| TBA | Ram | SP Aswathy | | |
| TBA | Musasi † | TBA | Tamil film | |

=== Television ===
| Year | Film | Role | Language | Notes | Ref. |
|---|---|---|---|---|---|
| 2022 | Panam Tharum Padam | Participant | Malayalam | Game show | |
| 2022 | Star Comedy Magic | Mentor | Malayalam | Fun show | |

=== Web series ===
| Year | Title | Role | Language | Platform | Notes |
|---|---|---|---|---|---|
| 2026 | Anali | TBA | Malayalam | JioHotstar | |

=== Short films ===
| Year | Title | Role | Language | Notes | Ref. |
|---|---|---|---|---|---|
| 2018 | Ezhamathe Chaya Chithram | Shayari | Malayalam | | |
| 2022 | Kankettu - The Undefined | Woman | Malayalam | | |
