= Pulimaranja Thondachan =

Regional Hindu god

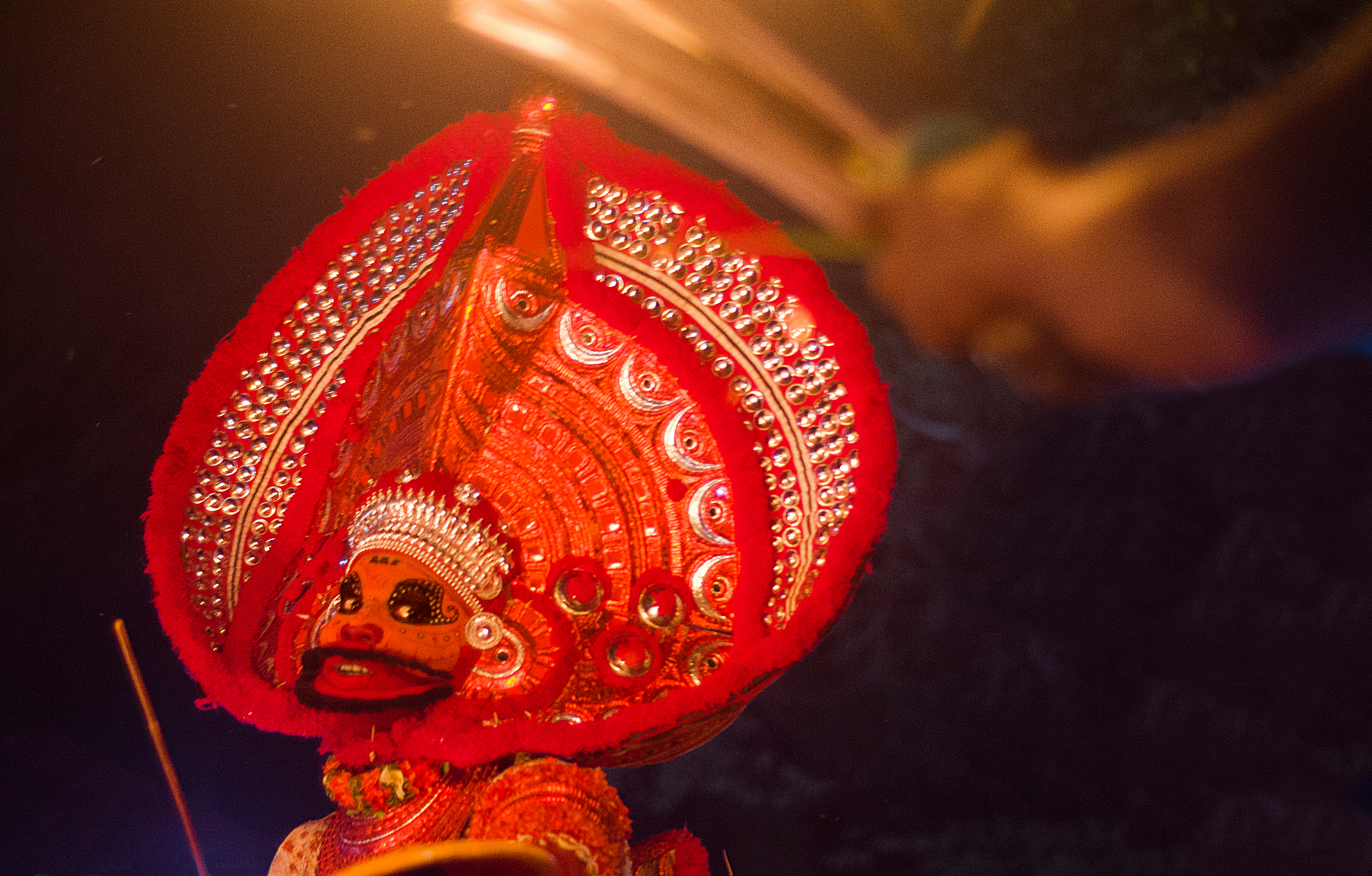
- Kari Kurikkal theyyam
- Affiliation: Hinduism
- Region: North Malabar, Kerala, India

Pulimaranja Thondachan, also known as Kari Kurikal, is a deity worshipped in the North Malabar region in Kerala, India. Pulimaranja Thondachan is worshipped and performed as theyyam. It is a deity worshipped by Pulayar community. Thondachan is a word used as a substitute for grandfather in North Malabar.

The play Pulijanmam written by N Prabhakaran and the Malayalam movie Pulijanmam directed by Priyanandanan based on it are related to the myth of Pulimaranja Thondachan.

== Overview ==
Pulimaranja Thondachan is a deity worshipped mainly by Pulayar community of North Malabar (present-day Kannur and Kasargod districts). It is believed that Kari, who possessed the magical skill to change body to a leopard, turned into a leopard at the request of King of Nileswaram but was tricked and hid in the forest. Pulimaranja Thondachan is worshipped and performed as theyyam.

== Myth ==
It is believed that a heroic man named Madai Kari Kurikkal turned into Pulimaranja Thondachan, a deity worshipped as theyyam, by the Pulaya community of Kerala.

Kari is the child of Vallikudichi Virunthi and Maniyan Kanjan, who were brought from Tiruvarkat Kav to work at farms of Kunjambu Nair, a jenmi at Chenicherry house in Kunhimangalam. Kari studied reading and writing under Chempitar Kurikkal. He wanted to study kalari vidya but was not admitted to kalari because he was a Pulaya. Kunjambu found a solution. He allowed Kari to use his name and family name instead of Kari's name and address. Thus, he studied kalari vidya from eighteen kalaris around the region and at last learned impersonation from Chothi Kalari. He was trained to change his disguise as a scorpion, a snake, a dog or a lion. After his education Kari returned to Madai Kalari, and from there he got the position of Kurikal. He married a young woman named Kunhivellachi.

Kari was not allowed to go to treat the insanity of the land lord of Alladam, even though he was called six times. The seventh request came as a copper inscription, in which it was written that half of the property would be given if Kari was sent.

The Kari who set out for Alladam had to face many trials on the way and overcame all of them with his magical skills. Finally, he reached Alladam and begins the magical rituals. Not to give half of his property as promised, the lord decided to kill Kari even though the lord's illness had improved. The lords said that he would give the property only if he brought a tiger, tiger's milk and the tiger's hair. Kurikal left for his home, ready to come back as a tiger. When he came home, he told his wife not to be afraid if he came as a leopard, but to dip his broom in dung water and slap his face.

Kari climbed the mountain and changed his body to leopard with his magical skills. then as leopard, he reached Alladam and gave all things as the lord said. On return to house, seeing the leopard, Kurikal's wife got scared and closed the door. As the wife did not done as he said earlied, he entered through the roof and kills his wife. He then jumped out from there and disappeared into the forest. Soon Lord of Alladam became insane again. After realizing that the reason for this is Kari Kurikal, people started worshiping the Kurikal as Pulimaranja (meaning tiger who disappeared) Thondachan. This is the legend.

== In popular culture ==
The play Pulijanmam written by N Prabhakaran and the Malayalam movie directed by Priyanandanan with the same name, based on it are related to the myth of Pulimaranja Thondachan.
