= Kudavattor =

Kudavattoor
- Village
- Interactive map of Kudavattoor
- Coordinates: 8°55′0″N 76°45′0″E
- Country: India
- State: Kerala
- District: Kollam

Population (1998)
  - Total: 15,021

Languages
  - Official: Malayalam, English
- Time zone: UTC+5:30 (IST)
- PIN: 691512
- Telephone code: 0474
- Vehicle registration: KL-2, KL-24, KL-02
- Nearest city: Kollam
- Sex ratio: 1:1.25 ♂/♀
- Literacy: 94%%
- Lok Sabha constituency: Mavelikkara
- Climate: temperate (Köppen)

Kudavattoor is a small village of the Kottarakara Taluk in the Kollam district of the Indian state of Kerala. In the local Malayalam language, kuda means "umbrella" and vattor "round". A predominantly rural village, Kudavattoor comes under the administration of the Veliyam Grama Panchayat made up of Maroor, Cherukarakonam and Kudavattoor chandhamukku. The village is situated on the odanavattom kollam road, which provides access to Kollam via Kundara or Nedumonkavu as well as to Kottarakara. Kollam, the district headquarters is situated about 25 km from Kudavattoor.

== History ==
Kudavattoor village was a local trading and cultural centre in the past. Documents suggest there were local markets in the area during early time, as well as "kudippallikkodam" which was the initial form of modern school. Surrounded by paddy fields, rocky hills and several water bodies, this area was part of the Kingdom of Travancore.

In post independent period it saw expansion in cultural and educational spheres and it produced notable people like Bharat Murali, Sunil Kudavattoor and others which excelled in diverse fields like academics, bureaucracy, etc.

== Economy ==
The major occupation in Kudavattor in the past is agriculture with the village producing paddy, vegetables, ginger, tapioca, coconut, pepper, honey, chena (elephant foot yam), peas and rubber.

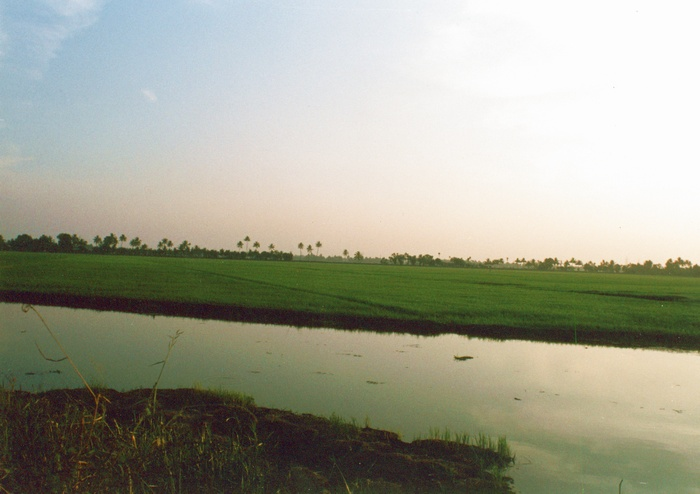
Paddy fields in Kudavattoor

The quarry business in Kudavattor helps many people to meet the day-to-day needs. Though mining remains a major source of income to people it is also causing problems to local environment due to pollution and alteration of the local landscape.

People in many families also work abroad and foreign remittance still remain a major income to the people.

== Demographics ==
The population is mostly Hindus, from main caste such as Nair and other castes like Ezhava, Parayar, Vedan, and Pulaya. There are also some Muslim and Christian villagers.

== Temples ==
The two main places of Hindu worship in Kudavattor are the Sivasastha Temple dedicated to Lord Shiva and lord Ayyappan and the Cherakarakonnam Parabrama Temple dedicated to Lord Vishnu. Besides,"Kaavus", are also common in the village. The famous Sree Mahaganapathy Temple is situated near to Kudavattoor. Centuries old, the site is the location of the most important Maha Ganapathi Temple in the state of Kerala. It allows admittance to non-Hindus. This temple is dedicated to the family of Lord Shiva and is located in Kottarakkara, 25 kilometres (16 mi) from Kollam.

== Culture ==
Proximity to Kottarakkara has its impacts to Kudavattoor as well. For past several decades it has been creating grounds for cultural interactions especially through dramas, reading clubs, etc. The works of Murali Cultural Society, Desasevini Library and other cultural clubs in the village largely play a role in this.

== Education ==
Kudavattoor LP School (classes one to four) is located near the Shivashastha Temple and commonly known as LPS Kudavattoor. Kudavatoor UP School (classes five to seven) is commonly known as UPS Kudavattoor. Both schools are aided by the government. Other nearby schools include: KRGPM Odanavattom, TVTM, SKV, Govt Boys Kottarakkara, and MGMRPS.

== Transportation ==
Transportation is mainly dependent on private buses as well as the state run KSRTC buses. It is connected to the capital city of Kerala, Thiruvananthapuram by KSRTC Fast Passenger. Buses also ply to the district headquarters of Kollam.

Kottarakkara Railway Station is located on the Kollam-Madurai railway line. The nearest airport is at Thiruvananthapuram. Kottarakkara railway station, which currently connects to Kollam and Punalur is 30 mins away.

== Notable people ==
- Murali (Muraleedharan Pillai), Malayalam actor, writer and former chairman of the Sangeetha Nadaka Academy
- Sunil Kudavattoor, actor and technician in the Malayalam film industry who has been part of several award winning films.

== Nearby villages ==
The main villages that surround Kudavattoor are:

- Ashanmukku
- Ambalathukala
- Paramukku
- Veliyam
- Odnavattom
- Chapathymukku
- Maroor
- Edakkidom

== Nearby towns and Cities ==
Nearby towns and cities and their distances from Kudavattor:

- Trivandrum - 85 kilometres (53 mi)
- Kollam - 25 kilometres (16 mi)
- Kottarakara - 8 kilometres (5.0 mi)
- Adoor - 30 kilometres (19 mi)
- Pandalam - 46 kilometres (29 mi)
- Punalur - 33 kilometres (21 mi)
- Pathanapuram- 31 kilometres (19 mi)
- Karunagappalli - 48 kilometres (30 mi)
- Parippally - 41 kilometres (25 mi)
- Mannadi- 26 kilometres (16 mi)
- Vendar - 7 kilometres (4.3 mi)
- Odanavattom - 2.5 kilometres (1.6 mi)

== See also ==
- Kollam
- Kottarakkara
- Kottarakkara Sree Maha Ganapathi Kshethram
- Karunagappally
- Pathanamthitta
- College of Engineering Adoor
- veliyam
