= Priyanandanan =

Indian film director (born 1966)

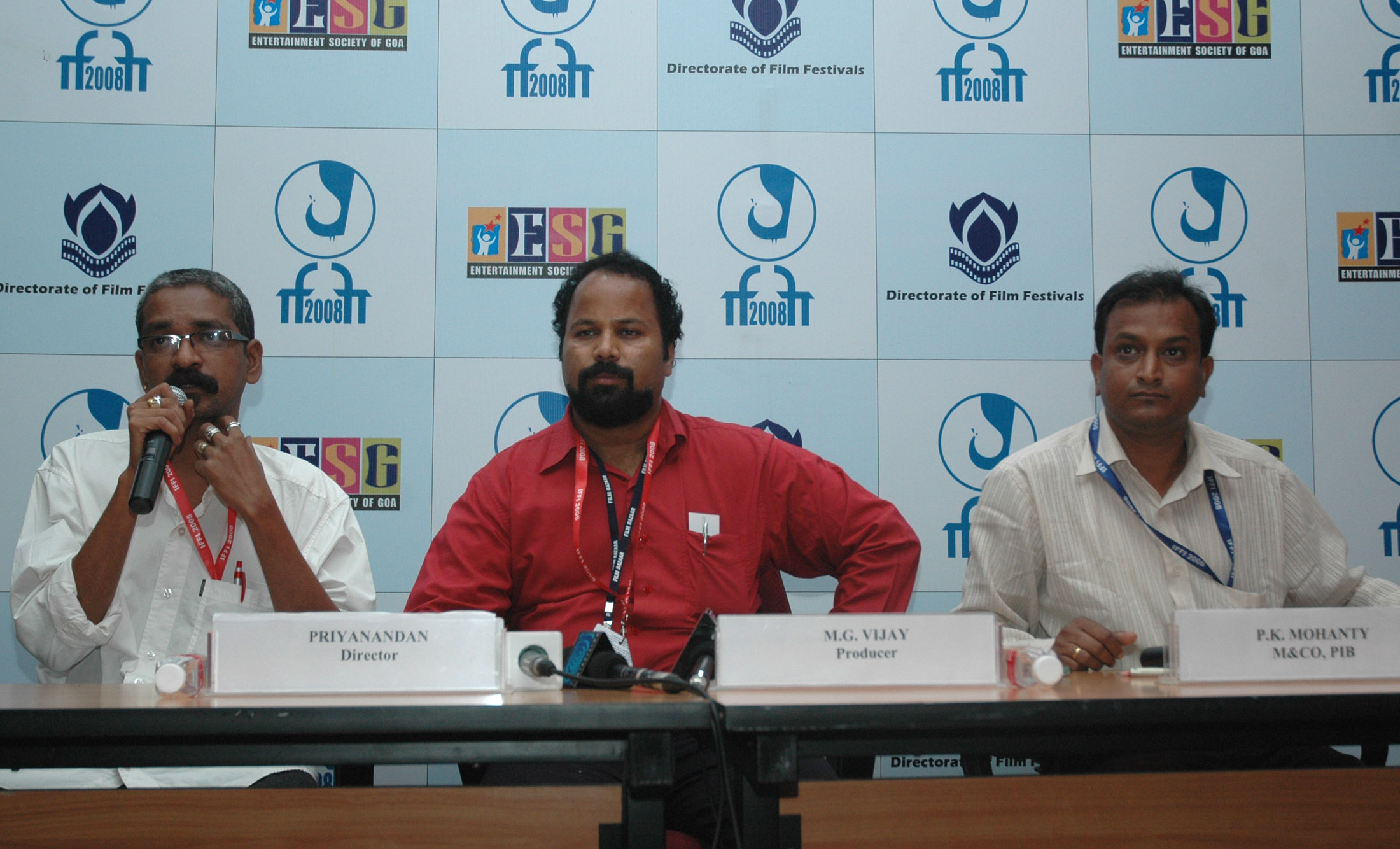
- Priyanandanan, IFFI (2008)
- Born: 20 February 1966; Vallachira Thrissur, Kerala, India
- Occupations: Film director, Actor, producer
- Years active: 2001–present
- Spouse: Ajitha
- Website: www.badalmediacinemacompany.in

Priyanandanan is an Indian film and drama director from Kerala. His second movie, Pulijanmam, received the National Film Award for Best Feature Film in 2006.

== Biography ==
Priyanandanan is a native of Vallachira in Thrissur District, Kerala. He was born as the son of Thottipparambil Ramakrishnan and Kochammini Priyanandanan started in career as an actor in stage shows. His career started as a female character. Later he ventured into direction of stage shows. He used to be known as Priyan Vallachira at that time.

Priyanandanan started his film career under famous directors K. R. Mohanan, P. T. Kunju Muhammed and Manilal. He began filming numerous newsreels and documentary shorts, which include Fight for Land and Man or Manninum Manushyanum Vendiyulla Samarangal (about Comrade Achudanandan), People's Leader or Jana Nayakan about E. K. Nayanar, Teacher or Gurunathan (about Sanskrit expert K P C Narayanan Bhattathiri), and The History of Strikes in Trissur District or Trissur Jillayile Samara Charithrangal. His first movie was Neythukaran (2001) and it told the story of a weaver, a supporter of E. M. S. Namboodiripad. Murali won the National Award for the Best Actor for this film. Priyan also directed several television films including four shorts based on M. T. Vasudevan Nair's short stories, and Asokan Cheruvil's Dead People's Sea (Marichavarude Kadal).

In 2015, Priyanandanan received the John Abraham Award from the Federation of Film Societies of India (FFSI–Kerala) for his Njaan Ninnod Koodeyund.

== Filmography ==
=== As director ===
Year	Title	Notes
2002	Neythukaran	
2006	Pulijanmam	
2010	Sufi Paranja Katha	
2011	Bhakthajanangalude Sradhakku	
2013	Oru Yathrayil	Segment: Marichavarude Kadal
2015	Njan Ninnodu Koodeyundu	
2018	Pathirakalam	
2020	Silencer	

=== As actor ===
Year	Film	Role	Notes
2008	Ssh..Silence Please		
2010	Thoramazhayath		Short film
2011	Scene No: 001		
2012	Poppins		
2013	Red Wine	Unni	
2020	Anjaam Pathiraa	Sudhakar Devalokam	
