= Pulijanmam =

- Film poster
- Directed by: Priyanandanan
- Written by: N. Prabhakaran; N. Sasidharan
- Produced by: M. G. Vijay
- Starring: Murali; Vineeth Kumar; Salim Kumar; Samvrutha Sunil; Sindhu Menon
- Cinematography: K. G. Jayan
- Edited by: Venugopal
- Music by: Kaithapram Viswanathan
- Release date: 26 May 2006
- Country: India
- Language: Malayalam

Pulijanmam (Malayalam: പുലിജന്മം, lit. Tigerlife) is a Malayalam feature film directed by Priyanandanan based on a 1987 play of the same name by N Prabhakaran. It stars Murali, Vineeth Kumar, Salim Kumar, Samvrutha Sunil and Sindhu Menon. It was released on 26 May 2006 and won the Swarna Kamal Award for the Best Feature Film in the 54th National Film Awards, 2006. The film was produced by M G Vijay and it was the second directorial venture by Priyanandanan, the first one being Neythukaran released in 2001. The citation for Pulijanmam said it was 'a layered film that uses metaphors to address global and local issues of contemporary society'. The film also won the John Abraham Award for Best Malayalam Film in 2006.

== Synopsis ==
The film Pulijanmam is based on N Prabhakaran's play of the same name. Kari Gurukkal, also known as Pulimaranja Thondachan (the great-grandfather who turned into tiger), is a folk god of Pulayas, a subaltern community in North Kerala. According to legends, Kari was a master of martial arts and other arts. Envious, the upper caste people ordered him to bring a tiger's mane and tail to cure the madness of the ruler. For this, he had to take the tiger form and go to the forest. To get his human form back when he returns from the forest, his wife should pour water used for cleaning rice and beat him with a broom. But when he returns from the forest, his wife got terrified by his form and fails to do what she was told to do. Unable to take human form, Kari goes back to the forest.

Prakashan is a graduate who leads a simple life of a farmer. He is more involved in local issues and politics than his personal life. Once Prakashan plans to stage a play titled 'Pulijanmam' for a local arts club. He does a lot of research on Kari Gurukkal and brings up the script. He himself rehearses to portray the main character in the drama, Thondachhan Theyyam Kari Gurukkal.

For playing the role of Vellachi, the female lead in the drama, Prakashan finds Shehnaz, a Muslim girl. The rehearsals go on, but due to the outbreak of communal riots in the area, the drama was cancelled. The Hindu-Muslim harmony in the village is broken due to the riots that lasted long. The situations take a U-turn and all the blame comes on Prakashan which makes him lose his close friends. In the meantime, his sister Anila leaves the family behind and takes the life of her choice which makes their mother lose her mental balance. Prakashan finds every situation he rehearsed for long in the drama to happen in his real life. In a final attempt to regain his life, he goes to meet Shehnaz and invite her to his life; but of the fear of Prakashan getting killed by her community men, she asks Prakashan to go back. The film ends when Prakashan realizes that his fate takes the same end as Kari Master.

== Cast ==
- Murali as Prakashan / Kari Gurukkal
- Sindhu Menon as Shahnaz / Vellachi
- Vineeth Kumar
- Samvrutha Sunil as Anila
- Salim Kumar
- Irshad as Ashraf
- Santhosh Jogi
- V. K. Sriraman as KKC (Party leader)
- Mullanezhi as Sukumaran master
- Vijeesh

== Awards ==
Year	Award	Category	Result
2006	54th National Film Awards	Best Feature Film (Swarna Kamal)	Won
2006	John Abraham Award	Best Malayalam Film	Won
