= Maharajavu =

- Directed by: P. Krishnaraj
- Written by: P. Krishnaraj
- Starring: Murali; Shari; Captain Raju; Anuradha
- Music by: Sharmaji
- Production company: Vaisakh Productions
- Distributed by: Vaisakh Productions
- Release date: 19 October 1989
- Country: India
- Language: Malayalam

Maharajavu is a 1989 Indian Malayalam film, directed by P. Krishnaraj. The film stars Murali, Shari, Captain Raju and Anuradha in the lead roles. The film has musical score by Sharmaji.

== Cast ==
- Murali
- Shari
- Captain Raju
- Anuradha
- K. P. Ummer
- Shanavas
