= Naradhan Keralathil =

- Directed by: Crossbelt Mani
- Written by: Cheri Viswanath
- Screenplay by: Cheri Viswanath
- Produced by: Jayasree Mani
- Starring: Jagathy Sreekumar; Mukesh; Nedumudi Venu; Hari
- Cinematography: Cross Belt Mani
- Edited by: C. Mani
- Music by: M. K. Arjunan
- Production company: Vidya Movie Tone
- Distributed by: Vidya Movie Tone
- Release date: 28 August 1987
- Country: India
- Language: Malayalam

Naradhan Keralathil is a 1987 Indian Malayalam-language satirical film, directed by Crossbelt Mani and produced by Jayasree Mani. It was a big disaster at the box office. The film stars Jagathy Sreekumar, Mukesh, Nedumudi Venu and Hari in the lead roles. The film has musical score by M. K. Arjunan.

== Cast ==
- Nedumudi Venu as Naradhan
- Jagathy Sreekumar as Mathan
- Mukesh as Narayanan Namboothiri
- Hari as Lord Vishnu
- Ravi Menon as Lord Siva
- C. I. Paul as Indran
- Ratheesh as Sub Inspector Rajeevan
- Bahadoor as Head Constable Kuttan Pillai
- Kuthiravattam Pappu as Head Constable Appukkuttan
- Bobby Kottarakkara as Police Constable Peppatti Poulose
- Kaduvakulam Antony as Police Constable Annyayam Ousepp
- Thodupuzha Vasanthi as Police Constable Saramma
- Balan K. Nair as Menon
- Vijayaraghavan as Khader
- Lalithasree as Pattalam Janaki
- Shari as Kausalya
- Vettoor Purushan as Lambodharna
- Poojapura Soman Nair

== Soundtrack ==
The music was composed by M. K. Arjunan and the lyrics were written by P. Bhaskaran.

No.	Song	Singers	Lyrics	Length (m:ss)
1	"Dhoomam Vallaatha Dhoomam"	K. J. Yesudas	P. Bhaskaran	
2	"Hare Raama"	Srikanth	P. Bhaskaran	
3	"Nandavanathile Sougandhikangale"	Vani Jairam, Lathika	P. Bhaskaran	
4	"Vidyaavinodini"	K. J. Yesudas	P. Bhaskaran	
