= Ven Shankhu Pol =

Venu Shankhu Pol
- Film poster
- Directed by: Asok R Nath
- Written by: Anil Mukhathala
- Produced by: Sanal Thottam
- Starring: Suresh Gopi; Manoj K Jayan; Jyothirmayi; Meera Nandan
- Cinematography: Ramachandra Babu
- Edited by: V. T. Sreejith
- Music by: Songs: M. Jayachandran; Anil Pongumoondu; Background Score: Anil Pongumoondu
- Production company: Sanal Thottam Arts
- Release date: 26 August 2011
- Running time: 180 minutes
- Country: India
- Language: Malayalam

Ven Shankhu Pol is a 2011 Indian Malayalam-language family drama film directed by Asok R. Nath, starring Suresh Gopi, Manoj K Jayan, Jyothirmayi and Meera Nandan in the lead roles. This film also turned out to be the last Malayalam film of late Malayalam actor Murali. The film was initially titled Ekadasi and produced by Sandeep R Nair before it was sold on outright basis to producer Sanal Thottam.

== Plot ==
Nandan (Suresh Gopi) is a well-respected and courageous war correspondent working for a reputed newspaper in Kolkata. Known for his honesty and professionalism, he has risked his life numerous times reporting from conflict zones across the world. Despite his dangerous profession, Nandan is a devoted family man. He lives with his loving wife Indu (Jyothirmayi), their two young children, his elderly mother, and his younger sister Aswathy (Meera Nandan), for whom he dreams of arranging a grand wedding.

One day, while returning from an assignment, Nandan begins to feel physically weak and emotionally detached. After a medical check-up, he is diagnosed with a terminal illness. The exact nature of the illness is never explicitly mentioned in the film, except that it is incurable and progressing rapidly. Nandan is devastated but chooses to keep the diagnosis a secret from his family. He believes that revealing the truth would only bring them unnecessary pain and panic.

As his condition deteriorates, Nandan quietly withdraws from his professional life and responsibilities. He becomes increasingly confined to his room and eventually bedridden. His physical condition worsens steadily—he is often seen lying silently in his bed, gazing at the ceiling, lost in thoughts of the life he once lived and the memories he cherished. Despite his suffering, he maintains a stoic silence, showing remarkable inner strength.

His wife Indu begins to sense that something is wrong. She notices the changes in his health, his detachment, and his lack of communication. However, Nandan avoids her concerned questions, brushing them off with vague answers. Meanwhile, his mother and sister also begin to worry, but like Indu, they are left in the dark.

Aswathy, unaware of her brother's condition, continues to dream about her future, including a marriage that Nandan had promised to arrange. He watches her happiness quietly, hiding the fact that he might not be there to fulfill that promise. His emotional burden becomes heavier each day, knowing he cannot share his pain.

As time passes, Nandan's condition reaches a critical stage. His health declines rapidly, and the family, now fully aware that something is gravely wrong, tries to care for him without knowing the true cause. Indu becomes emotionally distraught, unable to understand why the man she loved is slipping away from her.

In a heartbreaking final act, Nandan dies peacefully at home, surrounded by the family he tried to protect through silence. Only after his death does the full extent of his illness and sacrifice become clear to his loved ones. The film ends on a note of quiet grief, with the family coming to terms with his loss and the silent love with which he endured his suffering.

== Cast ==
- Suresh Gopi as Nandan
- Murali
- Manoj K Jayan
- Jyothirmayi as Indu
- Meera Nandan as Aswathy
- Anoop Menon
- Lalu Alex
- Chembil Ashokan
- Sukumari
- Sreekutty

== Reception ==
A critic from Indiaglitz wrote that "All in all, 'Venshakupol' targeted at the rarest gentry, will not have much takers and is all set to disappear in a week".
