= Kulirkaala Megangal =

- Title card
- Directed by: C. V. Sridhar
- Written by: C. V. Sridhar
- Produced by: K. S. Srinivasan; K. S. Sivaraman
- Starring: Arjun; Sadhana
- Cinematography: Bhaskara Rao
- Edited by: K. R. Ramalingam
- Music by: Shankar–Ganesh
- Production company: Vaasan Brothers
- Release date: 29 August 1986
- Country: India
- Language: Tamil

Kulirkaala Megangal (transl. The Clouds of Winter) is a 1986 Indian Tamil-language film, written and directed by C. V. Sridhar. The film stars Arjun and Sadhana. It was released on 29 August 1986.

== Cast ==
- Arjun
- Sadhana
- Kanchana
- Vanitha
- Jaishankar
- Thengai Srinivasan
- Manorama
- Vennira Aadai Moorthy
- Prathapachandran

== Production ==
A horse race scene was shot at Guindy Race Course.

== Soundtrack ==
The music was composed by Shankar–Ganesh, with lyrics by Vaali.

Song	Singers	Length
"Vanna Kuthirai Vaganamaga"	S. P. Balasubrahmanyam	04:27
"Mella Peysum Vizhi Mounam"	S. P. Balasubrahmanyam, S. P. Sailaja	03:53
"Vaanam Sevaanam Ven Megam"	K. J. Yesudas, Vani Jairam	04:07
"Ancharu Masam Adiye Un Neasam"	Malaysia Vasudevan	04:39
"Illaigal Meethum Malargal Meethum"	S. P. Balasubrahmanyam, Vani Jairam	04:56
