= Oru Maymasa Pulariyil =

- Directed by: V. R. Gopinath
- Screenplay by: V. R. Gopinath
- Story by: Ranjith
- Produced by: Alex I. Kadavil
- Starring: Balachandra Menon; Murali; Shari; Nedumudi Venu
- Cinematography: Santosh Sivan
- Edited by: Rajasekharan
- Music by: Raveendran
- Production company: Thara Movies
- Release date: 27 November 1987
- Running time: 151 minutes
- Country: India
- Language: Malayalam

Oru Maymasa Pulariyil is a 1987 Indian Malayalam-language film co-written and directed by V. R. Gopinath, starring Balachandra Menon, Murali and Shari. It was the debut of Ranjith, who wrote the story of the film.

== Plot ==
Balachandra Menon's character comes to investigate the reasons for the apparent suicide of Shari's character. Shari's character is the central theme of the plot for the film.

== Cast ==
- Balachandra Menon
- Murali
- Shari
- Ashokan
- Parvathy
- Kaviyoor Ponnamma
- Nedumudi Venu
- Sreeja
- Dheeraj

== Soundtrack ==
The music was composed by Raveendran with lyrics by P. Bhaskaran.

No.	Song	Singers	Length (m:ss)
1	"Iru Hridayangalil"	K. J. Yesudas, K. S. Chithra	
2	"Manushyan"	K. J. Yesudas	
3	"Mummy Mummy"	K. S. Chithra, Ajithan, Baiju	
4	"Pularkaala" (Pathos)	K. S. Chithra	
5	"Pularkala Sundara"	K. S. Chithra	
