= Kannamma (TV series) =

- Cover Photo of Kannamma
- Genre: Soap opera Family; Drama
- Written by: N. Khirushnasamy
- Directed by: Vethapuri Mohan
- Starring: Sonia; Pollachi Babu; Kiruthika; Ranjit Babu
- Country of origin: India
- Original language: Tamil
- No. of seasons: 1
- No. of episodes: 100+

Production
- Producer: Thangavel
- Camera setup: Multi-camera
- Running time: approx. 20-22 minutes per episode
- Production company: Vel Media

Original release
- Network: Kalaignar TV
- Release: 2 November 2015 – 29 April 2016

Kannamma is a 2015 Indian Tamil-language soap opera starring Sonia, Pollachi Babu, Kiruthika, Rajasekhar and Sumangali. It aired Monday through Friday 20:00 (IST) on Kalaignar TV from 2 November 2015 through 29 April 2016.

== Plot ==
Kannamma story revolves around the one family and the family Kannamma (Sonia) how she face all the problem without a husband and get a good solution.

== Cast ==
- Sonia as Kannamma
- Pollachi Babu as Srinivas
- Kiruthika
- Rajasekhar
- Sumangali
- Jasak
- Azhaku
- Niranjani Ashok as Inspector Aaradhana

== Airing history ==
The show started airing on Kalaignar TV on 2 November 2015 and It aired on Monday through Friday 9:30PM (IST). Later its timing changed, Starting from Monday 4 January 2016, the show was shifted to 8:00PM (IST) time Slot.
