= Maanmizhiyaal =

- Directed by: Krishnaswamy
- Written by: M. S. Vasavan
- Screenplay by: M. S. Vasavan
- Produced by: M. S. Vasavan
- Starring: Ashokan; Sithara; Shari; Sukumari
- Cinematography: E. N. C. Nair
- Edited by: Rajasekharan
- Music by: Murali Sithara
- Production company: Sreemuruka Arts Productions
- Distributed by: Sreemuruka Arts Productions
- Release date: 16 February 1990
- Country: India
- Language: Malayalam

Maanmizhiyaal is a 1990 Indian Malayalam film, directed by Krishnaswamyand and produced by M. S. Vasavan. The film stars Ashokan, Sithara, Shari and Sukumari in the lead roles. The film has musical score by Murali Sithara.

== Cast ==
- Ashokan
- Sithara
- Shari
- Sukumari
- Maniyanpilla Raju
- Jagannatha Varma
- KPAC Sunny
- Poojappura Ravi
- Baby Jinju as Child Artist

== Soundtrack ==
The music was composed by Murali Sithara and the lyrics were written by Vayalar Madhavankutty.

| No. | Song | Singers | Lyrics | Length (m:ss) |
|---|---|---|---|---|
| 1 | "Illikkaatile" | K. J. Yesudas | Vayalar Madhavankutty | |
| 2 | "Kunungikkunungi" | Lathika, K. V. Sivadasan | Vayalar Madhavankutty | |
