= Red Rain (2013 film) =

Indian science fiction thriller film

- DVD Cover
- Directed by: Rahul Sadasivan
- Written by: Rahul Sadasivan
- Screenplay by: Rahul Sadasivan
- Produced by: Rahul Sadasivan; Sachin Sadasivan
- Starring: Narain; Mohan Sharma; Shari; Tini Tom; Leona Lishoy
- Cinematography: Jomon Thomas
- Edited by: Andrea Fortis
- Music by: Josh Spear
- Release date: 6 December 2013
- Running time: 101 minutes
- Country: India
- Language: Malayalam

Red Rain is a 2013 Indian Malayalam-language science fiction thriller film written and directed by Rahul Sadasivan. It stars Narain, Mohan Sharma, Tini Tom, Shari, Leona Lishoy, Andrea Fortis, and Sergio Kalei. Red Rain was produced by Sachin Sadasivan and Rahul Sadasivan, under the banner Highlands Entertainment, and released theatrically in India on 6 December 2013. The film is loosely based on the Kerala red rain phenomenon.

== Synopsis ==
A young scientist investigates a series of mysterious events, such as the unexpected deaths of cattle and bright lights in the sky. He becomes convinced that they are caused by extraterrestrial life-forms.

== Cast ==
- Narain as Jay
- Mohan Sharma as Professor
- Rubia as Victim
- Shari as Victim's mother
- Sachin Sadasivan as Jay's brother
- Tini Tom as Reporter
- Andrea Fortis as Andrea
- Sergio Kalei as Sergio
- Vishnu Warrier as Neel
- Leona Lishoy as Neha
- Adinad Sasi as Witness

== See also ==
- List of Malayalam horror films
