= Neythukaran =

Malayalam film

- Directed by: Priyanandanan
- Written by: N. Sasidharan
- Produced by: K Sethumadhava Das
- Starring: Murali; Vijayaraghavan; Sona Nair
- Cinematography: Jain Joseph
- Release date: 2002
- Country: India
- Language: Malayalam

Neythukaran is a 2002 Malayalam film, the first directed by Priyanandanan, starring Murali. It tells the story of a weaver, a supporter of E. M. S. Namboodiripad, who dies the day after his leader dies.

Murali won the National Film Award for Best Actor in 2002 for his performance in this film.

== Plot ==
Namboodiripad, the leader of the first democratically elected Communist government is dead. (His death was on the same day as the BJP-led government came to power in the centre. This coincidence strengthened the mystic cloud around the man called EMS by his friends). Appa Mestry, a veteran Communist who lives in the nostalgia of "those great days", is unable to believe that EMS has died. For him, EMS is a great leader, whose death is unthinkable. He goes back to those ages, where they worked for the freedom struggle, risking their lives. He proudly remembers the day when he took Comrade P. Krishnapilla on his shoulder safely across the river. He remembers contemptuously the day when the first EMS ministry was dismissed by the central government as a result of unjust agitation by the religious lobbies of Kerala. He had even fasted when AK Gopalan had gone on a fast against a government decision.

Appa Mestry's next generation, his son-in-law and his friend Bahuleyan, who have discarded their extremist leftist ideology, are illustrated as frauds. (Bahuleyan no longer has a beard, which he had worn during his Communist days; he no longer uses bedis.) According to Appa Mestry, his son-in-law has done wrong by not closing his office when hearing about the death of EMS. They drive their car to get alcohol, while the whole of Kerala grieves the death of EMS by observing harthal. Appa's grandchildren are indifferent and are immersed in their own worlds. During the television coverage of the funeral procession, Appa's grandson sits watching a cricket match, completely oblivious to EMS's legacy.

Appa Mestry dies broken hearted the following day, the day of EMS's funeral.

== Cast ==
- Murali as Appa Mestry
- Vijayaraghavan
- M. R. Gopakumar as Bahuleyan
- Sona Nair
- Irshad
- Santha Devi
- Sreenath as Appa's grandson
- Christy Thomas as Appa's granddaughter

== Awards ==
Year	Award	Category	Recipient	Result
2001	Kerala State Film Awards	Best Debut Director	Priyanandanan	Won
2002	National Film Awards	Best Actor (Silver Lotus)	Murali	Won
