= Keli Kottu =

- Directed by: T. S. Mohan
- Produced by: T. S. Mohan
- Starring: Devan; Shari
- Music by: Rajamani
- Release date: 1990
- Country: India
- Language: Malayalam

Kelikottu is a 1990 Indian Malayalam film, directed and produced by T. S. Mohan. The film stars Devan and Shari in the lead roles. The film has musical score by Rajamani.

== Cast ==
- Devan
- Shari
- Sathaar
- Bheeman Raghu
- Karan
- Charan Raj
- Pradeep Shakthi
- Sonia
- Sadhana
- Mini
- Priya
- Aarya
- Sajan
- Babu
- Mohan
- Ramadas

== Soundtrack ==
The music was composed by Rajamani and the lyrics were written by Mankombu Gopalakrishnan.

No.	Song	Singers	Lyrics	Length (m:ss)
1	"Kuyil Paadum"	K. S. Chithra, M. G. Sreekumar	Mankombu Gopalakrishnan	
2	"Veendum"	K. S. Chithra	Mankombu Gopalakrishnan	
