= Aadhaaram =

- Poster
- Directed by: George Kithu
- Written by: Lohithadas
- Produced by: N. Krishnakumar (Kireedam Unni)
- Starring: Murali; Suresh Gopi; Geetha
- Cinematography: Ramachandra Babu
- Edited by: Venugopal
- Music by: Johnson
- Release date: 14 February 1992
- Country: India
- Language: Malayalam

Aadhaaram is a 1992 Malayalam-language drama film directed by George Kithu, written by Lohithadas. The film stars Murali as Bapputty, who is trying to rebuild life after completing his prison sentence. The film also features Suresh Gopi, Geetha, and Sudheesh in supporting roles.

== Plot ==
Bapputty is a convict who is released from jail after serving his sentence. The film tells the story of his attempts to build back his life and his accidental interference in the family affairs of Rameshan and his sister Sethulakshmi.

== Cast ==
- Murali as Bapputty
- Suresh Gopi as Vasu
- Geetha as Sethulakshmi
- Usha as Shayida
- Sudheesh as Rameshan
- Janardhanan as Krishna Menon
- Sukumari as Naniyamma
- Shari as Amina
- Mamukkoya as Kunjappu
- V. K. Sreeraman as Musaliyar
- Beena Antony as Sreedevi Menon
- Karamana Janardhanan Nair as Abdullah
- Sankaradi as Kesavan Nair
- Poojappura Ravi as Shankaran Nair
- Subair as Kunjalikutty
- Remyasree as Bhanumathy
- Indrans as Dinakaran
- Aboobacker as Kuttan Nair
- Jose Pellissery as Laser
- Sivaji as Yacob
- Manju Satheesh as dancer
- Salim Bava as Keerikadan Thomas

== Soundtrack ==
All lyrics are written by Kaithapram Damodaran; all music is composed by Johnson.

No.	Title	Artist(s)	Length
1.	"Angadinnangaadinnu"	K. S. Chithra, Choir
2.	"Manjaadimanikondu"	K. J. Yesudas, Choir

== Awards ==
- Kerala State Film Award for Best Dubbing Artist: Anandavally
- Kerala State Film Award for Best Actor: Murali
- Kerala State Film Award for Best Debut Director: George Kittu
- Filmfare Award for Best Actress – Malayalam - Geetha
- Filmfare Award for Best Actor – Malayalam - Murali|
