= Nenjathai Allitha =

- Title card
- Directed by: Ameerjan
- Story by: Kanmani Subbu
- Produced by: R. Vadivelu
- Starring: Mohan; Naresh; Sadhana
- Cinematography: S. Ganesapandiyan
- Edited by: S. S. Nasir
- Music by: M. S. Viswanathan
- Production company: R. V. Creations
- Release date: 4 May 1984
- Country: India
- Language: Tamil

Nenjathai Allitha (transl. Pour your heart) is a 1984 Indian Tamil-language romantic drama film directed by Ameerjan, starring Mohan, Naresh and Sadhana. It was released on 4 May 1984.

== Plot ==
Mohan and Murali love Radhika, while she loves Murali only. The film has many twists which make Sadhana accept Mohan's love, but Murali resurfaces. The climax reveals who wins Radhika's love.

== Cast ==
- Mohan
- Naresh as Murali
- Sadhana as Radhika
- K. A. Thangavelu
- Y. G. Mahendran
- Typist Gopu

== Production ==
This was originally the directorial debut of Ameerjan but became the second to be released. The film's final schedule was held at Sathanur Dam where romantic scenes of Sadhana and Naresh and the song "Udhatum Udhatum" were shot.

== Soundtrack ==
Soundtrack was composed by M. S. Viswanathan.

Track listing
No.	Title	Singer(s)	Length
1.	"Uthadam"	S. P. Balasubrahmanyam, Ramola
2.	"Ammadi Teynampettai"	Malaysia Vasudevan, L. R. Eswari
3.	"Neeril Oru Thamarai"	P. Jayachandran
4.	"Koil Muzhuthum"	P. Susheela
5.	"Nalla Kavignan"	Malaysia Vasudevan, Vijay Ramani
6.	"Deewani"	S. P. Balasubrahmanyam, Vani Jairam

== Reception ==
Jayamanmadhan of Kalki criticised the film for being too formulaic.
