= Manaivi Oru Manickam =

- Directed by: Chozharaajan
- Written by: Rama Narayanan; Pugazhmani (dialogues)
- Produced by: N. Ramasamy
- Starring: Arjun; Mukesh; Radha; Sadhana; S. S. Chandran
- Cinematography: W R Chandran
- Edited by: Rajakeerthi
- Music by: Shankar–Ganesh
- Production company: Sri Thenandal Pictures
- Release date: 17 March 1990
- Country: India
- Language: Tamil

Manaivi Oru Manickam (transl. Wife is a gem) is a 1990 Indian Tamil-language supernatural thriller film directed by Chozharaajan and written by Rama Narayanan. The film stars Arjun, Mukesh (in his Tamil debut), Radha, Sadhana and S. S. Chandran. It was released on 17 March 1990.

== Cast ==
- Arjun as Vijay
- Mukesh as Ravi
- Radha as Gayathri
- Sadhana as Female Serpent
- Radha Ravi in a Guest Appearance
- S. S. Chandran
- Babloo
- Dubbing Janaki as Meenakshi
- Charle
- Idichapuli Selvaraj
- Kullamani
- Y. Vijaya
- Kovai Sarala
- Disco Shanthi

== Soundtrack ==
The soundtrack consist of five songs composed by Shankar–Ganesh. Lyrics are by Vaali and Tha. Narayanan.

Song	Singers	Lyrics
"Kunguma Nayagi"	K. S. Chitra and chorus	Vaali
"Rasathi Nagavalli"	Mano	Vaali
"Nathan Mudimele"	K. S. Chitra	Vaali
"Rambai Thandi"	Mano and S. P. Sailaja	Tha. Narayanan
"Poojai Neram"	K. S. Chitra and chorus	Vaali

== Reception ==
P. S. S. of Kalki wrote leaving the actors behind, the snakes and eagles leaping to scratch, the story's interest stands at the fore.
