= Ithente Neethi =

- Poster designed by P. N. Menon
- Directed by: J. Sasikumar
- Written by: Salim Cherthala
- Produced by: Sreelakshmi Creations
- Starring: Shankar; Rajya Lakshmi; Shari; Jose; Balan K. Nair; Bahadoor; V. N. Raj; Kuthiravattam Pappu
- Cinematography: Thara
- Edited by: G. Venkittaraman
- Music by: Johnson
- Production company: Sreelakshmi Creations
- Distributed by: Sreelakshmi Creations
- Release date: 20 March 1987
- Country: India
- Language: Malayalam

Ithente Neethi is a 1987 Malayalam-language Indian feature film, directed by J. Sasikumar for Sreelakshmi Creations, starring Shankar in the lead role, supported by Balan K. Nair, Rajya Lakshmi and Shari playing other important roles. It is a remake of the Kannada film Thaliya Bhagya.

== Plot ==
Ithente Neethi is the story of a faithful dog and his love for his master, who was brutally killed by the villain. The film is the tale of revenge done by the dog on his master's killers.

== Cast ==
- Shankar
- Rajya Lakshmi
- Shari
- Jose
- Balan K. Nair
- Bahadoor
- V. N. Raj
- Kuthiravattam Pappu

== Soundtrack ==
The music was composed by Johnson and the lyrics were written by Poovachal Khader.

No.	Song	Singers	Lyrics	Length (m:ss)
1	"Changaathi Arinjuvo"	Vani Jairam	Poovachal Khader	
2	"Ekaantha Theera Bhoomiyil"	K. J. Yesudas	Poovachal Khader	
3	"Swaram Manassile Swaram"	P. Jayachandran, Lathika	Poovachal Khader	
