= Thoranam (film) =

- Directed by: Joseph Madappally
- Written by: Joseph Madappally
- Screenplay by: Joseph Madappally
- Produced by: V. Rajan
- Starring: Nedumudi Venu; Yamuna; Janardhanan; Kunjandi
- Cinematography: Mankada Ravi Varma
- Edited by: Ravi
- Music by: G. Devarajan
- Production company: Gireesh Pictures
- Distributed by: Gireesh Pictures
- Release date: 21 March 1987
- Country: India
- Language: Malayalam

Thoranam is a 1987 Indian Malayalam-language film, directed by Joseph Madappally and produced by V. Rajan. The film stars Nedumudi Venu, Yamuna, Janardhanan and Kunjandi in the lead roles. The film has musical score by G. Devarajan.

== Cast ==
- Nedumudi Venu as Gopi
- Yamuna
- Janardhanan
- Kunjandi
- M. G. Soman
- Oduvil Unnikrishnan
- Vanchiyoor Radha

== Soundtrack ==
The music was composed by G. Devarajan and the lyrics were written by O. N. V. Kurup.

No.	Song	Singers	Lyrics	Length (m:ss)
1	"Aattakkuruvi"	P. Madhuri	O. N. V. Kurup	
2	"Manaswini Nin"	K. J. Yesudas	O. N. V. Kurup	
