= Itha Samayamayi =

- Directed by: P. G. Vishwambharan
- Written by: Gayathri Ashokan
- Starring: Jagathy Sreekumar; Ratheesh; Jayaram (Old); Karamana Janardanan Nair
- Edited by: G. Murali
- Music by: Shyam
- Production company: Royal Productions
- Distributed by: Royal Productions
- Release date: 15 May 1987
- Country: India
- Language: Malayalam

Itha Samayamayi is a 1987 Indian Malayalam film, directed by P. G. Vishwambharan. The film stars Jagathy Sreekumar, Ratheesh, Jayaram and Karamana Janardanan Nair in the lead roles. The film has musical score by Shyam. The film is loosely based on the incident of police atrocities in Thankamany village in Kerala state.

== Cast ==
- Ratheesh as Sunny
- Shari as Leelamma
- Jagathy Sreekumar as Pirivu Antony
- Karamana Janardanan Nair as Paramanandan Pilla
- Ragini (New) as Susamma
- Innocent as LIC Pathrose
- M. G. Soman as Priest
- Kunjandi as Panchayat President
- Bahadoor as Paulose
- Thrissur Elsy as Claramma
- Kunchan as Pappan
- Valsala Menon as Jagathamma
- Prathapachandran as Mathai
- Rohini as Alice
- Meena as Sunny's mother
- Janardhanan as MLA Vattappara
- Bheeman Raghu as Thampi
- Kundara Johny as Johny
- Guinness Pakru as Tea shop helper

== Soundtrack ==
The music was composed by Shyam and the lyrics were written by Shibu Chakravarthy.

No.	Song	Singers	Lyrics	Length (m:ss)
1	"Ponmala"	K. J. Yesudas	Shibu Chakravarthy	
2	"Varikayaay"	K. J. Yesudas	Shibu Chakravarthy	
