= Nombarathi Poovu =

- Directed by: P. Padmarajan
- Written by: P. Padmarajan
- Starring: Mammootty; Madhavi; Baby Sonia; Shari
- Cinematography: S. Kumar
- Edited by: B. Lenin
- Music by: M. G. Radhakrishnan; Johnson
- Release date: 9 April 1987
- Country: India
- Language: Malayalam

Nombarathi Poovu (English: The Sorrowful Flower) is a 1987 Malayalam drama film, written and directed by P. Padmarajan. It സ്റ്റാർസ് Madhavi, Baby Sonia,Mammootty, Shari, and Unnimary. It focuses on the relationship between Gigi (Sonia) and Padmini (Madhavi). Its songs were composed by M. G. Radhakrishnan, while the background score was done by Johnson.

== Plot ==
The movie shows how a young woman, Padmini, who is separated from her husband, becomes attached to an orphan girl, Gigi, she meets while they are hospitalised after a bus accident. Gigi lost her mother in the accident, and Padmini decides to take Gigi with her. Gigi is not completely mentally stable and is a special needs child. Padmini brings Gigi to Dr. Padmanabhan, who after initial apprehension accepts Gigi in his institute as a student by day. Gigi gradually improves, and Padmini is peaceful. Padmini's separated husband, Sethu, still tries to win her back. Padmini had separated from her husband because she lost her children due to an episode of reckless motorcycle riding with her husband. Padmini decides to return to Sethu and adopt Gigi as their daughter. However, Gigi's special behavior annoys Sethu, and Gigi starts to feel insecure about losing her mother again. The movie goes on to show Padmini's emotional turbulence.

In the end, Gigi 'plays' hide and seek in the forest with Padmini who tries to find her. Unfortunately, Gigi goes deeper into the forest and goes missing. She leaves her doll behind. Padmanabhan reveals that Gigi has died when Padmini mourns her daughter's loss.

== Cast ==
- Madhavi as Padmini
- Sonia as Gigi
- Mammootty as Dr. Padmanabhan
- Shari as Anitha
- Unnimary as Joycee
- Lalu Alex as Sethu
- Jagathi Sreekumar as Sebastian
- Murali as Samuel
- Kundara Johnny
- Vinduja Menon as Shanthi
- Baby Shubha as Sumi

== Production ==
Padmarajan had initially decided to cast Shabana Azmi in the lead role of Padmini. For this, Padmarajan and producer Gandhimati Balan made a visit to Shabana's home in Juhu, Bombay. They spent time with Shabana's father and poet Kaifi Azmi. They realised Shabana had made inquiries about Padmarajan and Gandhimati and was eager to work with them. The three sat down to script reading. After the reading, Shabana agreed to do the role, but on one condition, that the Malayalam dialogues be reduced and prominence given to her expressions. Padmarajan immediately closed his script notebook and apologised to Shabana that it would not be possible.

== Award ==
- Kerala State Film Award for Best Child Artist for Baby Sonia
