= Four Plus Four =

- Directed by: Jacob Breeze
- Produced by: Breeze Films
- Starring: Jacob Breeze, Rajasekaran, M Kunjandi, Sivan, Punnapra Appachan, KV Dev, CMS, Chittedam, Dasan, Mini, Ramyashree, Uma Maheshwari, Sreerekha, Leena Jose, Saumini
- Cinematography: Vijay
- Edited by: Suresh
- Music by: Guna Singh
- Production company: Breeze Films
- Release date: 4 July 1987
- Country: India
- Language: Malayalam

Four Plus Four is a 1987 Indian Malayalam film, directed by Jacob Breeze. The film had musical score by Guna Singh.

== Soundtrack ==
The music was composed by Guna Singh and lyrics was written by Poovachal Khader.

No.	Song	Singers	Lyrics	Length (m:ss)
1	Vellimegham Pole	KS Chithra	Poovachal Khader	
