= Vendar =

- village
- Location in Kerala, India Vendar (India)
- Coordinates: 9°2′0″N 76°44′0″E
- Country: India
- State: Kerala
- District: Kollam

Languages
  - Official: Malayalam, English
- Time zone: UTC+5:30 (IST)
- PIN: 691507
- Vehicle registration: KL-24
- Nearest city: Kottarakara on east side & Puthoor on west side
- Literacy: 100%
- Lok Sabha constituency: Mavelikkara

Vendar is a village in Kottarakara taluk, Kollam district, Kerala, India. It has many educational institutions and many temples, including Major Sree Subrahmanya swamy Temple, Vendar Devi Temple, Kathiravan Kunnu Sree Balasubrahmanya Swamy Temple, Madathikal Devi Temple. Vendar Thaipooyam is one of the main festival attraction of this village which is celebrated on January/February.
