= Sonia (actress) =

Indian actress

- Born: 26 August 1977 (age 48)
- Occupation: Actress
- Years active: 1977–present
- Spouse: Bose Venkat (m. 2003)
- Children: 2
- Relatives: Tinku (brother)

Sonia (formerly Baby Sonia) is an Indian actress, who works in Tamil and Malayalam films and serials.

== Career ==
She debuted, at the age of three, as a child artist in the Malayalam film Ival Oru Naadodi. She continued to appear in many films as a child actor. During her childhood she lent her voice for many child artists mainly for Baby Shalini. She got Kerala State Film Award for Best Child artist for the movie Nombarathi Poovu in 1987. She also got National Award for best child artist for the movie My Dear Kuttichathan. She acts in Tamil, Kannada, Telugu movies as well.

== Personal life ==
Her brother Tinku is an actor in Tamil movies and shows. She married Tamil actor Bose Venkat.

== Awards ==
- 1984 National Film Award for Best Child Artist - My Dear Kuttichathan
- 1987 Kerala State Film Award for Best Female Child Artist - Nombarathi Poovu

== Filmography ==
=== Malayalam ===
Year	Title	Role	Notes
1977	Swarna Medal		
1978	Manoratham		
1979	Ival Oru Naadody		
1980	Moorkhan	Young Rajani	
1980	Theekkadal		
1980	Esthappan		
1981	Raktham	Minimol	
1982	Anthiveyilile Ponnu	Hari's daughter	
1982	Innalenkil Nale		
1982	Ee Nadu		
1982	Enthino Pookunna Pookal		
1983	Iniyenkilum		
1983	Veedu		
1983	Yudham		
1983	Aroodam	Paru	
1983	Asuran		
1984	Karimbu	Painkili	
1984	Radhayude Kamukan		
1984	Ivide Ingane		
1984	My Dear Kuttichathan	Laxmi	
1984	Swanthamevide Bandhamevide		
1986	Ariyaatha Bandham		
1986	Vartha	Young Radha	
1987	Nombarathi Poovu	Gigi	
1987	Thaniyavarthanam	Anitha M. Balagopalan (Manikutty)	
1987	Ithrayum Kaalam	Young Savithri	
1988	Daisy		
1988	Manu Uncle	Renu	
1990	Midhya	Ammini	
1993	Addeham Enna Iddeham	Annie	
1993	Venkalam	Sulochana	
1993	Uppukandam Brothers	Annie	
1993	Ghazal	Aasiya	
1994	Sainyam	Pathuma	
1994	Thenmavin Kombath	Kuyilu	
1994	Avan Ananthapadmanabhan	Manju	
1995	Minnaminuginum Minnukettu	Sathi	
1995	King Solomon	Seethamma	
1995	Kusruthikaatu	Monica	
1995	The King	Alex's sister	
1995	Aksharam	Bindu Balakrishnan	
1997	My Dear Kuttichathan 2	Lakshmi	
1997	Guru	King Vijayanta' wife	
1998	Mattupetti Machan	Chenthamara	
2000	Mister Butler	Gopalakrishnan's first wife	
2001	Aparanmaar Nagarathil	Anju & Manju (Double role)	
2002	Bamboo Boys		
2002	Kattuchembakam	Paaru	
2003	Achante Kochumolku		
2008	Roudram	Nirmala	
2008	Swarnam	Sugandhi	
2008	Sound of Boot	Bhadra	
2009	Therukoothu		
2010	Nizhal		
2010	Njaan Sanchaari		
2010	Puthumukhangal	Thankamani	
2010	Raama Raavanan	Bhama	
2011	Vellaripravinte Changathi	Preman's wife	
2011	Sandwich	Andipetti Nayiker's wife	
2011	Sarkar Colony	Thresiamma	
2012	Mullassery Madhavan Kutty Nemom P. O.	Anupama	
2013	Housefull		
2013	Teens		
2015	Ellam Chettante Ishtam Pole	Ganga Devi	
2016	Crayons	Soni	
2017	Zebra Varakal		
2018	Nazeerinte Rosy		

=== Tamil ===
Year	Title	Role	Notes
1984	Anbulla Rajinikanth		
1985	Viswanathan Velai Venum	Julie	
1985	En Selvame		
1985	Annai Bhoomi		
1986	Mouna Ragam	Divya's sister	
1986	Maragatha Veenai		
1987	Nalla Pambu		
1987	Poo Poova Poothirukku	Latha	
1987	Raja Mariyadhai		
1989	Mappillai		
1989	Meenakshi Thiruvilayadal	Kokila	
1990	Pulan Visaranai	Nimmy, Dolly	
1991	Azhagan	Kanmani's sister	
1991	Thangamana Thangachi	Geetha	
1992	Mouna Mozhi	Rukku	
1994	Ilaignar Ani	Janani	
1997	Sishya	Anu	
1997	Veerapandi Kottayile	Jaya	
1999	Poovellam Kettuppar	Herself	Cameo appearance
2000	Karuvelam Pookkal	Dhanalakshmi	
2001	Vaanchinathan	Revathi Varadharajan	
2001	Veettoda Mappillai	Mohana	
2001	Kanna Unnai Thedukiren	Bhuvana	
2002	In the Name of Buddha		
2002	University	Gouri	
2002	Style	Anjamma	
2002	Shree	Velayudham's wife	
2002	Namma Veetu Kalyanam	Kannamma	
2003	Parthiban Kanavu	Kuyili	
2006	Thalai Nagaram	Balu's wife	
2010	Chutti Chathan	Lakshmi	
2010	Uthamaputhiran	Lalitha (Lallu)	
2015	Soan Papdi		
2015	Sakalakala Vallavan	Thangam	
2015	Eetti	Pughazh's mother	
2015	Massu Engira Masilamani	Dr. Gnanaprakasham's wife	
2016	Velainu Vandhutta Vellaikaaran	Sengamalam	
2016	Kodi		
2016	Manal Kayiru 2	TV Host	
2017	Gemini Ganeshanum Suruli Raajanum	Gemini's mother	
2017	Theeran Adhigaaram Ondru	Sathya's wife	
2018	Veera	Rajendran's wife	
2019	Kuttram Seiyel	Roba Raja's assistant	Malaysian film
2019	Vennila Kabaddi Kuzhu 2	Malar's mother	
2024	Emakku Thozhil Romance	Subha	
2025	Kuzhanthaigal Munnetra Kazhagam		
2025	Thanal	Madhivadani Ranganathan	

=== Other language films ===
Year	Title	Role	Language	Notes
1989	Namma Bhoomi		Kannada	
1990	Padmavathi Kalyanam		Telugu	
1991	Indra Bhavanam		Telugu	
1995	Ravan Raaj: A True Story	Dolly (Twins Appearance) / Roli	Hindi	

== Television serials ==
Year	Title	Role	Channel	Language
	Asaigal			Tamil
	Meesai Aanalum Manaivi	Mythili		Tamil
2002–2004	Amma		Sun TV	Tamil
2003–2004	Sahana Sindhu Bairavi Part-II	Mallikakumari	Jaya TV	Tamil
2005–2007	Malargal	Karpagam	Sun TV	Tamil
2005–2007	Muhurtham		Sun TV	Tamil
2007	Shri Ayappanum Vavarum	Panthalam Rani	Surya TV	Malayalam
2007	Paasam	Aishwarya	Sun TV	Tamil
2008	Pavitha Jaililanu		Asianet	Malayalam
2009–2011	Madhavi	Kokila		
2010–2012	Chellamay	Kalaivani	Sun TV	Tamil
2010–2012	Uravugal	Vasanthi	Sun TV	Tamil
2011–2012	Avakaashikal	Urmila	Surya TV	Malayalam
2011–2012	Veera Marthanda Varma		Surya TV	Malayalam
2012–2013	My Name Is Mangamma	Paravathy	Zee Tamil	Tamil
2012–2013	Amudha Oru Aacharyakuri	Vimala	Kalaignar TV	Tamil
2013–2014	Mamiyar Thevai	Leela	Zee Tamil	Tamil
2013–2014	Mannan Magal		Jaya TV	Tamil
2013–2014	Penmanassu	Sarada	Surya TV	Malayalam
2015	Enga Veettu Penn	Alangaram	Zee Tamil	Tamil
2015–2016	Kannamma	Kannamma	Kalaignar TV	Tamil
2018–2019	Vandhal Sridevi	Shambhavi	Colors Tamil	Tamil
2019	Arundhathi	Revathy	Sun TV	Tamil
2020-2021	Neethane Enthan Ponvasantham	Pushpa	Zee Tamil	Tamil
2021–2022	Pandavar Illam	Mullaikodi	Sun TV	Tamil
2022	Bhagyalakshmi	Bhagyalakshmi (Replaced by Reshmi Soman)	Zee Keralam	Malayalam
2022	Jamelaa	Dr. Mumtaz	Colors Tamil	Tamil
2023	Meena	Kasthuri	Sun TV	Tamil
2024-2025	Uppu Puli Kaaram	Sharmila	Disney+ Hotstar	Tamil
2025–present	Varisu	Meena	Zee Tamil	Tamil

== TV shows ==
- Rani Maharani as Participant
- Genes (season 3) as Participant
- Ruchibhedham as Presenter
- My G Flowers Oru Kodi as Participant

== As a playback singer ==
- Oru Madapravinte Katha (1983) ... "Muththe Va Va"

== As a dubbing artist ==
- Ente Mamattukkuttiyammakku (1983) for Baby Shalini
- Sandarbham (1984) for Baby Shalini
- Chakkarayumma (1984) for Baby Shalini
- Akkacheyude Kunjuvava (1985) for Baby Shalini
- Oru Nokku Kanan (1985) for Baby Shalini
- Parayanumvayya Parayathirikkanumvayya (1985) for Baby Shalini
- Onnu Muthal Poojyam Vare (1986) for Geethu Mohandas
- Kannamma (2005) for Vindhya
