= Symbiosis Institute of Business Management, Bengaluru =

Indian business school

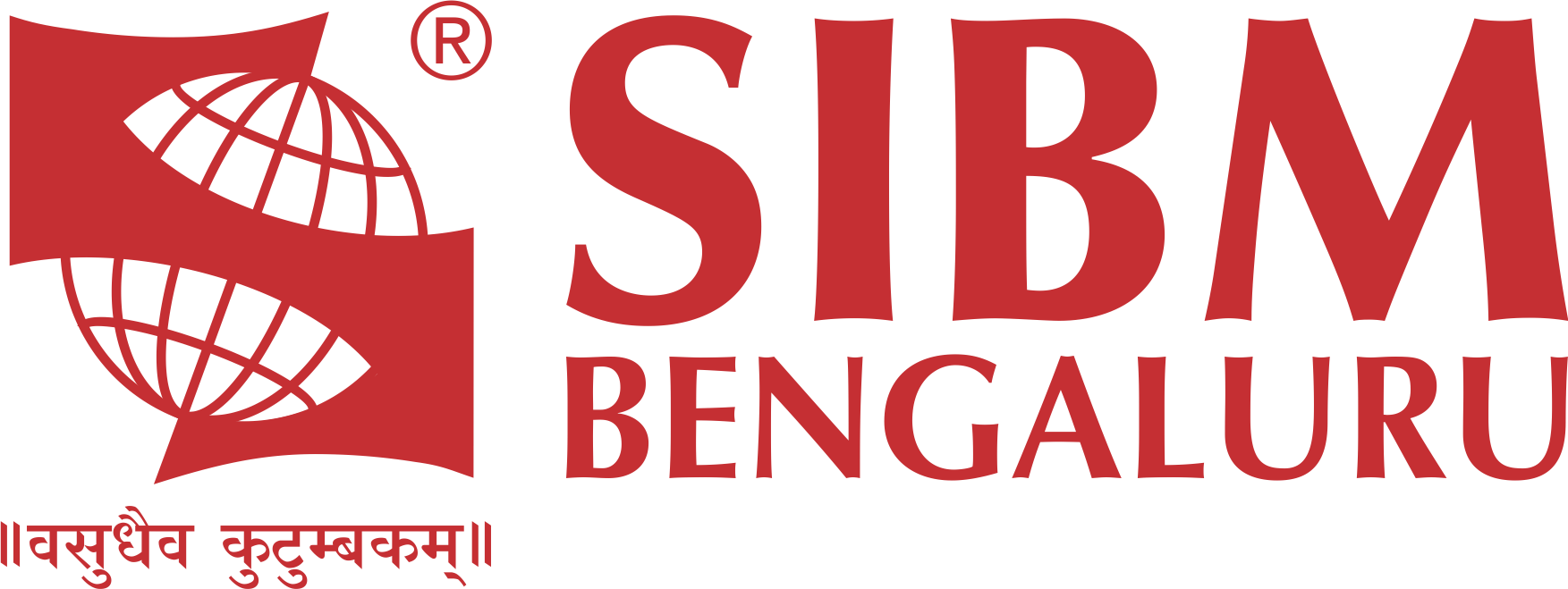
- Motto in English: The whole world is a family
- Type: Private business school
- Established: 2008
- Affiliations: UGC, Symbiosis International University
- Chancellor: S. B. Mujumdar
- Director: Dr. K Rajagopal
- Location: Bengaluru, Karnataka, India
- Campus: Urban
- Website: sibmbengaluru.edu.in

Symbiosis Institute of Business Management, Bengaluru (SIBM) is an Indian business school situated in Electronic City, Bangalore, Karnataka. It is a constituent of the Symbiosis International University.

== History ==
The institute was established in 2008 as a constituent of Symbiosis International University a Deemed University located in India. It is the second campus of Symbiosis Institute of Business Management (SIBM).

The establishment of SIBM Bengaluru was driven by the growing importance of Bengaluru as a major center for information technology, entrepreneurship, and global business. Its location in Electronic City enabled closer interaction with industries and corporate organizations.

Since its inception, the institute has focused on providing postgraduate management education with an emphasis on academic rigor, industry engagement, and holistic development. Over the years, SIBM Bengaluru has developed its academic infrastructure and strengthened its position as a recognized business school within the Symbiosis network.

== Events ==
The college is also home to a number of annual events and recently hosted the South Regional round of Deloitte Maverick.

The annual events hosted by the college include:

- Utopia

The annual International Cultural fest organized by the International Relations Committee is an event to promote the welfare of the international students studying in India.

- Utthaan

Organized by the Social Responsibility Committee the event showcases the talent of underprivileged kids living in NGOs in the city of Bengaluru.

- Alchemy

Organized by the Conferences & Events Committee Alchemy is a management conclave that provides a quality platform for eminent speakers to share industry insights with students.

- TEDx SIBM Bengaluru

This independently organized TED event brings together speakers and ideas to spark discussions and inspire new ways of thinking.

- LifeDart 5K Run

Organized for the first time in the year 2015 the event conducted by the Rotaract Club was able to raise Rs. 1,95,000 through the event.

- Revelation

Organized by the Extracurricular Committee, Revelation, is the flagship event of the college. The fest includes management, cultural and sports events.

The students of the college also organized a tree maintenance drive (Symbriksha) in collaboration with Say Tress organization with an intent of planting saplings around the city of Bengaluru.

Other events organized by the college include Symbrikha and Cycle Day
