= Murali (Malayalam actor) =

Indian politician

- Born: Muraleedharan Pillai; 25 May 1954; Kudavattoor, State of Travancore-Cochin (present day Kollam, Kerala), India
- Died: 6 August 2009 (aged 55); Thiruvananthapuram, Kerala, India
- Occupation: Actor
- Years active: 1986 – 2009
- Spouse: Mini
- Children: 1

Muraleedharan Pillai (25 May 1954 – 6 August 2009), better known by his stage name Murali, was an Indian film, stage and television actor and author. He mainly appeared in Malayalam films and a few Tamil films. He won the National Film Award for Best Actor for his portrayal of Appa Mestry, a communist freedom fighter and professional weaver, in the 2002 film Neythukaran. He was known for his powerful portrayal of character roles, lead roles and negative roles, and is widely regarded as one of the greatest actors in Malayalam cinema.

Murali started his film career playing villain roles and soon turned to character acting. He played the leading role in the 1992 film Aadhaaram, which gave a "break" to his career. The film was well received at the box office and Murali ascended to the status of a star in Malayalam cinema, which he enjoyed for a few years during the 1990s. Besides acting, he was the chairman of the Kerala Sangeetha Nataka Academy from 2006 until his death. He also authored five books, and was also a Sangeetha Nataka Academy award winner. He contested at the 1999 Lok Sabha polls as a communist candidate without success. He was also the Director of the CPI(M) promoted television company Malayalam Communications Limited, which runs Malayalam TV channels Kairali TV, People TV and We TV. His last film was the 2011 film Ven Shankhu Pol. He is one of the founders of the Malayalam film actors association AMMA.

== Early life ==
Muraleedharan Pillai was born on 25 May 1954 as the first of five children to P. Krishna Pillai and K. Devaki Amma at Kudavattoor, Kollam, Kerala, India. His four siblings are: Thulaseedharan, Sheela, Harikumar and Sheeja. He did his schooling from Kudavattoor L. P. School and Thrikannamangalam S. K. V. High School. He passed the pre-degree from M.G. College, Thiruvananthapuram and his Degree from Devaswom Board College, Sasthamkotta. He was an active member of the Students Federation of India. He took an LL.B degree from the Kerala Law Academy Law College, Thiruvananthapuram. After studies, he worked for some years as Lower Division clerk in the Department of Health, Government of Kerala and as Upper Division clerk in the office of Kerala University. He was married to his first cousin Mini and has a daughter Karthika. His daughter married Sonoop R. Nair on 15 July 2016.

== Career ==
=== Film actor ===
Murali debuted in films with the lead role in Njattadi, directed by Bharath Gopi. But the film was never released. He then got chance to act in Chidambaram, directed by the National Award-winning filmmaker Aravindan. He then acted in Meenamasathile Sooryan and Panchagni, directed by Lenin Rajendran and Hariharan, respectively. Panchagni got released first and it gave him the break in his acting career. He soon established himself as a powerful actor in the Malayalam film industry. Aadhaaram, directed by George Kittu, was the first film to be released with Murali in a lead role. He acted in a variety of roles, ranging from lead roles to villain roles, and won accolades. Some of his other notable films include Nee Ethra Dhanya, Dhanam, The King, Pathram, Chakoram, Veeralippattu, Achan Kombathu Amma Varambathu, Meenamasathile Sooryan, Swarnam, Kaarunyam and The Truth"Amaram". Also worth-mentioning are his remarkable portrayals as a toddy tapper in Malayogam and as trade union leader in Varavelppu.

Murali acted in the longest TV commercial ever on Indian TV, spanning 150 seconds. This was for Air Deccan in 2005.

=== Stage actor ===
Murali was actively involved with Natyagriham, a drama venture started by actor Narendra Prasad. Murali won critical acclaim for his portrayal of Ravana in the Malayalam play Lanka Lakshmi, which was based on C. N. Sreekantan Nair's novel of the same name. He was also associated with G. Sankara Pillai in doing theatre plays.

=== Author ===
Murali authored five books. His book on Kumaranasan, Abhinethavum Asan Kavithayum (Actor and Asan's Poetry) won him the Sangeetha Nataka Academy award. One of his other critically acclaimed books was Abhinyathinte Rasathanthram (Chemistry of Acting).

=== Politician ===
Murali was a member of Communist Party of India (Marxist) and contested the 1999 Lok Sabha polls from the Alappuzha constituency as a Left Democratic Front candidate, but lost to V. M. Sudheeran of Indian National Congress.

== Death ==
Murali died in Thiruvananthapuram on 6 August 2009 at the age of 55, due to acute diabetes which led to a heart attack at 8.20 PM IST. He was cremated with full state honours at his home in Aruvikkara, which he had bought some years prior to his death.

== Awards ==
National Film Awards:

- 2001 – Best Actor – Neythukaaran

Kerala State Film Awards:

- 1992– Best Actor – Aadhaaram
- 1996 – Best Actor – Kaanakkinavu
- 1998 – Best Actor – Thalolam (film)
- 2001 – Best Actor – Neythukaaran
- 1991 – Second Best Actor – Amaram
- 2007 – Second Best Actor – Veeralipattu, Pranayakalam

Kerala state TV Awards

- 2008– Kerala State Television Award for Best Actor – Aranazhikaneram

Filmfare Awards:

- 1992 – Best Actor – Aadharam

Other awards:

- Madras Film Fans Award
- Kerala Film Critics Award
- Shivaram Award
- Best columnist award: for his feature "Vyazhaporul" in the Malayala Manorama newspaper

== Filmography ==
=== As actor ===
==== Malayalam ====
Year	Title	Role	Notes	Ref.
1979	Njattadi	Raghu		
1985	Chidambaram	Cheriyan		
1986	Meenamasathile Sooryan	Abubakar		
1986	Panchagni	Rajan		
1987	Nombarathi Poovu	Samuel		
1987	Neeyethra Dhanya	Hafiz Ali		
1987	Ezhuthapurangal	Raveendranath		
1987	Archanapookkal			
1987	Jaalakam	Shivankutty		
1987	Rithubhedam	Appu		
1987	Swathi Thirunal	Shadkala Govinda Marar		
1987	Oru Maymasa Pulariyil			
1988	David David Mr. David	Mr. David		
1988	Oohakachavadam			
1988	Vida Parayaanmathram	Sebastian Joseph		
1988	Kanakambarangal	Ananthan Balussery		
1988	Puravrutham	Achu		
1988	Samvalsaragal			
1988	Mattoral	Mahesh		
1988	Ayitham	Kachery Mani Iyyer		
1988	Arjun Dennis			
1988	Padippura			
1988	Moonnam Mura	Jayan		
1989	Naduvazhikal	Cherian		
1989	Kireedam	Lokanathan, Sub-Inspector		
1989	Anagha	Thommachan		
1989	Kaalal Pada	Firoz		
1989	Pandu Pandoru Desathu			
1989	Maharajavu			
1989	Dasharatham	Chandradas		
1989	Asthikal Pookkunnu	Sreedharan / Bhaskaran		
1989	Varavelpu	Prabhakaran		
1989	Artham	R. K. Nambyar		
1990	Mathilukal	Basheer's childhood friend		
1990	Vidhyarambham	Prabhakaran		
1990	Orukkam	Chandru		
1990	Ee Thanutha Veluppan Kalathu	Philip Thennalackal George		
1990	Unnikuttanu Joli Kitti			
1990	Kshanakkathu			
1990	Kuttettan	Nair		
1990	Malayogom	Damodaran		
1990	Lal Salam	D.K. Antony		
1990	Ee Kanni Koodi	Vidyadharan		
1990	Aye Auto	Bhadran		
1990	Appu	Gopan		
1990	Kalikkalam	CI Shekharan		
1991	Ulladakkam	Roy		
1991	Santhwanam	John		
1991	Vishnulokam	Prathapa Varma Thampuran		
1991	Pookkalam Varavayi	Jayaraj		
1991	Kizhakkunarum Pakshi	Johnny		
1991	Yaathrayude Anthyam	Writer VKV		
1991	Adayalam	Dr. Mohan		
1991	Keli	Appootty		
1991	Kadavu	Rahman		
1991	Dhanam	Aboobacker/Abu		
1991	Aakasha Kottayile Sultan	Georgekutty		
1991	Amaram	Kochu Raman		
1991	Inspector Balram	City Police Commissioner Madhavan Nair IPS		
1991	Kanalkkattu	Ramu		
1992	Aardram	Uppan Raghavan		
1992	Valayam			
1992	Snehasagaram	Josekutty		
1992	Arthana	Ramachandran		
1992	Sadayam	Madhavan Jailer		
1992	Kamaladalam	Madhavanunni		
1992	Sathyaprathinja	Achuthan		
1992	My Dear Muthachan	Kuriachan		
1992	Champakulam Thachan	Raghavan		
1992	Aadhaaram	Bapputty		
1992	Kauravar	Commissioner Rajagopal		
1992	Mahanagaram	Commissioner Chandradas		
1993	Porutham	Nanda Kumar		
1993	Venkalam	Gopalan		
1993	Naaraayam	Shekharan		
1993	Janam	Balachandran		
1993	Chamayam	Esthappan Aasan		
1993	Magrib	Razaq		
1993	Bhoomi Geetham	Thekkinkadu Krishnaprasad		
1993	Akashadoothu	Johnny		
1994	Sammohanam	Chandu		
1994	Chakoram	Lance naik Mukundan Menon		
1994	Sankeerthanam			
1995	Sakshyam	Col. Rajasekharan Nambiar		
1995	Prayikkara Pappan	Achuthan / Prayikkara Pappan		
1995	Achan Kombathu Amma Varampathu	Chandrasekhara Menon		
1995	Indian Military Intelligence	Captain Anthony Domenic		
1995	The King	MP Jayakrishnan		
1995	Mangalyasootram	Karnan		
1995	Chaithanyam			
1996	Kaanaakkinaavu	Chandradas		
1996	Aayiram Naavulla Ananthan	Dr. Nandakumar		
1996	Rajaputhran	K.R.Bhadran		
1996	Thooval Kottaram	Balaraman Varma		
1997	Sankeerthanam Pole	Kunjachan		
1997	Irattakuttikalude Achan	Venu		
1997	Adivaram	Constable Izahaq		
1997	Karunyam	Gopinathan Nair		
1997	Guru	Sahib Abdullah		
1997	Gangothri	Mukundan Menon		
1997	Bhoopathi	Ravi Varma		
1998	Rakthasakshikal Sindabad	E. Sreedharan		
1998	Kattathoru Penpoovu			
1998	Thirakalkkappuram	Moothoru		
1998	Thalolam	Chittoor Sankaran Unni		
1998	Kaikudunna Nilavu	Rowther		
1998	The Truth	DGP Hariprasad IPS		
1998	Kallu Kondoru Pennu	Haridasan		
1999	Pathram	Shekharan		
1999	Independence	Kunikal Vasu		
1999	The Godman	Home Minister Abdul Rahim		
1999	Garshom	Nazaruddin		
2000	Kannaadikkadavathu			
2000	Susanna	Josekutty		
2000	Sparsham	Valappil Raghavan		
2000	Devadoothan	Alberto		
2000	Dada Sahib	Dr. Raveendran		
2001	Sukhamo Sukam			
2002	Jagapoga			
2002	Aabharanacharthu			
2002	Neelakasham Niraye			
2002	Neythukaran	Appa Mestry		
2002	Sesham			
2002	Shivam	Sudhakaran MP		
2003	Gramophone	Ravindranathan		
2003	C.I.D. Moosa	CM Ravi Menon		
2003	Anyar			
2003	The Fire	Zakaria George		
2004	Maratha Nadu	Kunjikoya		
2004	Pravaasam			
2004	Nizhalkuthu	Vasu		
2004	Runway	Bhai/Chandy		
2005	Kochi Rajavu	Chandrashekhara Menon		
2005	Iruvattam Manavaatti	Const. Anadan		
2005	Kanne Madanguka	Bhagyanathan		
2005	The Tiger	Jnanashekhara Varma IPS		
2005	Annorikkal	Father of Benny & Beena		
2006	Vadakkumnadhan	Balarama Pisharadi		
2006	Achante Ponnumakkal			
2006	Vaasthavam	Pattam Raveendran		
2006	Baba Kalyani	Arackal Ashokan		
2006	Photographer	Viplavam Balan		
2006	Pulijanmam	Prakashan / Kari Gurukkal		
2006	Eakantham	Ravunni Menon		
2007	Vinodayathra	Vijayan		
2007	Drishtantham			
2007	Naalu Pennungal	Chinnu Amma's husband	Segment: The Housewife	
2007	Veeralipattu	Madhavan Nair		
2007	Pranayakalam	Stephen Varghese		
2008	Aayudham	Abdullah		
2008	Cycle	Simon		
2008	Swarnam	Raghavan		
2008	Sound of Boot	Sankaranarayanan		
2009	Kshatriyavamsam			
2009	Malayali	Viswanathan Menon		
2009	Patham Adhyayam	Kumaran Ashari		
2011	Ven Shankhu Pol		Posthumously	
2013	Manjadikuru	Sanyasi Maaman / Murali	Released after 5-year gap	

==== Tamil ====
Year	Title	Role	Notes	Ref.
2001	Dumm Dumm Dumm	Veluthambi		
2002	Gemini	DGP Singaperumal		
2002	Raajjiyam	Governor		
2003	Joot	Eashwaran's father		
2003	Arasu	CBI Officer Harikrishnan	credited as Bharath Murali	
2005	Ullam Ketkumae	Pooja's father		
2005	Raam	Malaichami		
2005	Majaa	Kalingarayar		
2007	Polladhavan	Shankar		
2009	Aadhavan	Subramaniam	Posthumous film; credited as Bharath Murali	

==== Other language films ====
Year	Title	Role	Language	Notes	Ref.
1997	Abhaas	Ray Sahab	Hindi		
2002	Gemini	Commissioner Narendranath Chowdary	Telugu		

=== Story ===
- Ennu Nadhante Nimmi (1986)

== Television career ==
- Aranazhika Neram (Amrita TV)
- Sakunam ( DD Malayalam)

== Posthumous recognition ==
The Bharat Murali Cultural Centre was established at his birthplace, Kudavattoor. It presents the annual Bharat Murali Award to distinguished contributors to Malayalam cinema.

- 1st (2010) - K. P. A. C. Lalitha, actress; Kuttyedathi, actress
- 2nd (2011) - Manoj K. Jayan, actor
- 3rd (2012) - Kaviyoor Ponnamma, actress
- 7th (2016) - Surabhi Lakshmi, actress; Indrans, actor
- 9th (2020) - Vijith Nambiar, director
