= Shari (actress) =

Indian actress

- Born: Sadhana
- Occupation: Film actor
- Spouse: Kumar (m. 1991)
- Children: Kalyani (b.1996)
- Parent(s): Subramaniam, Lakshmi Devi
- Relatives: Ashwanth Thilak (nephew)

Sadhana, better known by her stage name Shari, is an Indian actress. She was a prominent lead actress from 1982 to 1995 in Malayalam, Tamil, Kannada, and Telugu films.

== Personal life ==
Sadhana was born to Subramaniam and Lakshmi Devi in Andhra Pradesh. She is a trained classical dancer who learned Bharata Natyam from Padma Subrahmanyam and Kuchipudi from Vempati Chinna Satyam. She had her primary education from Saraswathi Vidyalaya Matriculation Higher Secondary School, Chennai. She is the granddaughter of famous Kannada actress B. Ramadevi.

She married Kumar, a businessman, in 1991. They have a daughter, Kalyani born in 1996. She resides with her family in Chennai.

== Career ==
She rose to fame after Malayalam film Namukku Parkkan Munthiri Thoppukal (1986). She received Kerala State Film Award for Best Actress for the same. In the Tamil industry, she is known as Sadhana. She received her first offer in a supporting role in Hitler Umanath in 1982 where she played Sivaji Ganesan's daughter. However she gained attention in her role as the heroine in Nenjathai Allitha (1984) where she was paired with Mohan.

== Awards ==
- 1986 Kerala State Film Award for Best Actress - Namukku Parkkan Munthiri Thoppukal
- 1986 Kerala State Film Critics Award - second best actress - Namukku Parkkan Munthiri Thoppukal
- 1986 Filmfare Award - Best Actress - Namukku Parkkan Munthiri Thoppukal
- 2017 Flowers TV awards - Best supporting actress - Nilavum Nakshatrangalum

== Filmography ==
=== Malayalam ===
Year	Title	Role	Notes
1984	Ningalil Oru Sthree	Sindhu	
1986	Namukku Parkkan Munthiri Thoppukal	Sofia	
1986	Desatanakkili Karayarilla	Sally	
1986	Onnu Muthal Poojyam Vare	Elizabeth	
1987	Athinumappuram	Shobha	
1987	Oru Maymasa Pulariyil	Suicided lady	
1987	Ithaa Samayamaayi	Leelamma	
1987	Naaradan Keralathil	Kousalya	
1987	Nirabhedangal	Susie	
1987	Kalathinte Shabdam	Radha	
1987	Theertham	Mercy	
1987	Kottum Kuravayum	Rani	
1987	Ithente Neethi		
1987	Archanapookkal	Saritha	
1987	Jaithra Yaathra	Geetha	
1987	Ponnu	Maya	
1987	Nombarathi Poovu	Anitha	
1987	Aankiliyude Tharattu	Sridevi	
1987	Vilambaram	Valsala	
1987	Veendum Lisa	Lisa	
1987	Ellaavarkkum Nanmakal	Balan's lover	
1988	Aparan	Anna	
1988	Onninu Purake Mattonnu	Molly	
1988	Thaala	Thaala	
1988	Ponmuttayidunna Tharavu	Dance teacher	
1988	Rahasyam Paramarahasyam	Deepa	
1989	Season	Indira	
1989	Mrigaya	Selina	
1989	Jeevitham Oru Raagam	Chithra	
1989	Jaathakam	Shyamala	
1989	Maharaajaavu		
1990	Kelikottu	Usha	
1990	Commander	Bharathi	
1990	Thaalam		
1990	Kalikkalam	Meera Nair	
1990	Maanmizhiyaal	Lakshmi	
1990	Sthreekku Vendi Sthree	Mrs. Rajesh/Advocate	
1991	Utharakandam		
1991	Arangu	Alice	
1991	Kanalkkattu	Sathi	
1991	Ennum Nanmakal	Rama	
1992	Savidham	Tessy	
1992	Annu Good Friday		
1992	Aadhaaram	Amina	
1992	Simhadhwani	Sarala	
1992	Mahaan	Jackson's sister	
1993	Aachaaryan	Sumithra	
1995	Sundharimaare Sookshikkika	Priya	
2000	Sayahnam	Amala's mother	
2002	Njaan Raajaavu	Stella	
2002	Basket	Saradha	
2003	Mayamohithachandran		
2007	Raakilipattu	Arundhathi	
2007	Chocolate	Eleena John	
2008	Positive	Winnie's mother	
2008	Sulthan	Nishi's mother	
2008	Novel	Manju	
2008	LollyPop	Jennifer's real mother	
2010	Pulliman		
2010	Mummy & Me	Mary Thomas	
2011	Mohabbath	Sajna's mother	
2011	Doctor Love	Ebin's mother	
2011	Snehaadaram		
2011	Ee Dhanya Muhoorttham		
2011	Kadhayile Nayika	Sophiya	
2011	Sandwich	Sreedevi	
2011	Bombay March 12	Shajahan's mother	
2012	Karppooradeepam	Meritta	
2012	Kalikalam	Meenakshi	
2012	Padmasree Bharat Dr. Saroj Kumar	Shyam's mother	
2013	Maad Dad	Sarala	
2013	Rebecca Uthup Kizhakkemala	Soshamma	
2013	Orissa	Christhudas's mother	
2013	Red Rain	Victim's mother	
2014	Vasanthathinte Kanal Vazhikalil	Theyi	
2014	Bad Boys		
2014	Law Point	Umadevi	
2015	Jilebi	Silpa's mother	
2016	Kannirinum Madhuram	Dr. Seethalakshmi	
2017	Bobby		Archive footage/Uncredited cameo (from Namukku Parkkan Munthirithoppukal)
2017	Meenakshi	Rohan's mother	
2022	Aquarium	Mother Superior	
2022	Jana Gana Mana	Shabana	
2022	Viddikalude Mash	Janaki	
2022	Saturday Night	Nirmala Davis	
2023	Kunjamminis Hospital	Dr. Rashmi Balan	
2026	Aasha	Geetha	

=== Tamil ===
Year	Title	Role	Notes
1982	Hitler Umanath	Umanath's daughter	
1984	Nenjathai Allitha	Radhika	
1984	Vai Sollil Veeranadi	Nagalakshmi	
1985	Arthamulla Aasaigal	Jaya	
1985	Chain Jayapal	Padma	
1985	Sithirame Sithirame		
1985	Unnai Thedi Varuven	Anita	
1986	Kulirkaala Megangal	Vasi	
1986	Naanum Oru Thozhilali	Padma	
1987	Raja Mariyadhai	Meena	
1987	My Dear Lisa	Lisa	
1987	Kavalan Avan Kovalan	Herself	Special appearance
1988	Raththa Dhanam	Radha	
1989	Enne Petha Raasa	Catherine	
1990	Vaaliba Vilayattu	Parvathi	
1990	Pathimoonam Number Veedu	Annam	
1990	Manaivi Oru Manickam	Female Serpent	
1991	Vetri Karangal	Radha/Kalpana	
1992	Ponnuketha Purushan	Anandhi	
1994	Veeramani		Special appearance
1995	Raja Enga Raja	Prabha	
2000	Snegithiye	Arundati	
2000	James Pandu		Guest role
2001	Love Channel	Parimalam	
2003	Pudhiya Geethai	Jo's mother	
2005	Thotti Jaya	Brinda's mother	
2007	Ammuvagiya Naan	Rani	
2007	Oru Ponnu Oru Paiyan		
2009	Aadatha Aattamellam	Kannan's mother	

=== Telugu ===
Year	Title	Role	Notes
1983	Mugguru Ammayila Mogudu		
1983	Iddaru Kiladilu		
1983	Moogavani Paga		
1987	Andarikante Ghanudu		
1989	Manchi Varu Maavaru	Radha	
1991	Lady Inspector	Dr. Madhuri Devi	
1992	Peddarikam	Chandra Shekarudu's wife	
1992	Teja	Sarada	

=== Kannada ===
Year	Title	Role	Notes
1983	Thayiya Nudi		
1983	Onde Guri		
1984	Samayada Gombe	Mangala	
1985	Brahma Gantu		
1993	Sita Anjaneya		
2003	Chandra Chakori	Puttaraju's mother	

== Television ==
=== Malayalam ===
Year	Title	Channel	Role
1997	Snehadaram	DD Malayalam	
1999	Sindhooram	Asianet	
2000	Sthree Oru Jwala	Asianet	
2001	Swantham Malooty	Surya TV	
2001	Sapathni	Asianet	
2002	Sparsham	Asianet	
2005	Sthreedhanam	Jeevan TV	
2008	Vaishaka Sandhya		
2017	Nilavum Nakshatrangalum	Amrita TV	
2023	Manimuthu	Mazhavil Manorama	Herself
2024-2025	Gayathridevi Ente Amma	Mazhavil Manorama	Gayathridevi
2024	Pookkalam	Mazhavil Manorama	Sophia

=== Tamil ===
Year	Title	channel	Role
	Arthamulla Uravugal		
	Love in Bangkok	Vasantham TV	
	Lakshmi Vanthachi		
	Mariyadhai		
	Iru Mugangal - Micro Thodar Macro Sinthanaigal		
2000–2001	Take it easy Vazhkai	Sun TV	
2000–2002	Gopuram	Sun TV	
2002–2003	Panam	Sun TV	
2001–2002	Nambikai	Sun TV	Visalam
2002-2003	Penn	Sun TV	Indira
2003–2005	Avargal	Sun TV	
2006–2007	Sorgam	Sun TV	
2007	Veppilaikkari	Sun TV	
2007	Latchiyam	Kalaignar TV	
2007	Nananyam	Sun TV	
2007-2008	Namma Kudumbam	Kalaignar TV	
2008–2010	Rekha IPS	Kalaignar TV	
2008-2009	Kanmanayee	Sun TV	Amudha
2009–2015	Thendral	Sun TV	Padma Muthumanikkam
2009–2011	Dhinam Dhinam Deepavali	Kalaignar TV	
2009	Thirumangalyam	Kalaignar TV	
2009–2012	Idhayam	Sun TV	Valmiki's mother
2012-2014	Vairakyam	Kalaignar TV	Dhanam
2013	Valli	Sun TV	Bhanumathi
2014–2018	Kalyana Parisu	Sun TV	Gomathy Dharmalingam
2014–2017	Kalyanam Mudhal Kadhal Varai	Vijay TV	Manju
2015–2016	Keladi Kanmani	Sun TV	Bhavani
2017–2019	Azhagiya Tamil Magal	Zee Tamizh	Rajamma
2017–2019	Chinna Thambi	Star Vijay	Prabha
2019–2020	Nila	Sun TV	Kausalya Rajashekar
2020	Anbudan Kushi	Star Vijay	Rajeswari (Raji)
2023-2025	Maari	Zee Tamil	Thara

=== Telugu ===
Title	Channel	Role
Karthavyam	Gemini TV	Meena IPS
Nanmakal	ETV Telugu	
Vijayam	ETV Telugu	
Jayam	ETV Telugu	
Brundavanam	ETV Telugu	
Amma	ETV Telugu	Kasthuri
