= Illam =

Namboodiri Brahmin house in Kerala

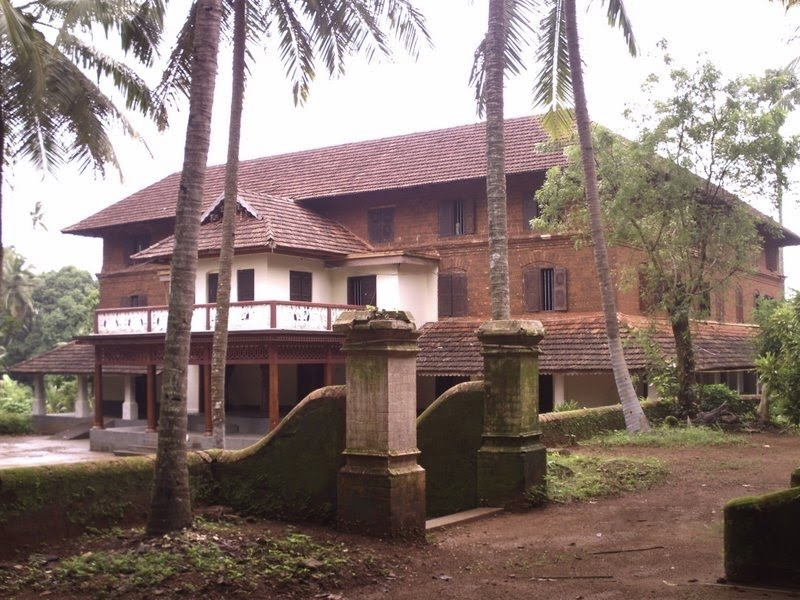
Varikkasseri Mana, which was used as a filming location for the 1993 Malayalam movie Devaasuram

Illam (/ˈɪləm/), also referred to as Mana, is the Malayalam word for the house of a Namboodiri Brahmin. In the traditional lineage system used for the classification and identification of homes based on the castes of Kerala, South India, an Illam served as the Tharavad (ancestral house) of Nambudiri Brahmin families. Illam also refers to the house of some prominent Nair and Ambalavasi families in certain regions of Kerala.

The Namboodiris, who constituted the highest ranking caste of Kerala, also refer to their lineages as the Brahmaalayam. The family homes are built according to the canons of Vaasthusaasthram, meaning "architecture" in the Sanskrit language. Very few illams continue to be used for dwelling, while most have been morphed into museums, ayurvedic health care centres and home stays in the struggle for survival.

== Structural layout ==
The traditional layout of a Namboodiri Illam is in the form of an open courtyard which is located in the middle, known as the Nadumuttam ('nadu' meaning middle and 'muttam' meaning earth/ground). These buildings or houses are designed in different patterns such as Nalukettu (a courtyard surrounded by rooms on four sides), Ettukettu (a nalukettu surrounded by another nalukettu), and Pathinarukettu (four layers of buildings constructed around a central courtyard).

== Popular examples ==
Some well-known Illams in Kerala include Suryakaladi Mana (Kottayam), Varikkasseri Mana (Palakkad), Pootheri Illam (Feroke), Eettisseri Mana (Kannur), Desamangalam Mana (Desamangalam), Nenmini Illam (Guruvayur), Punnorkottu or Swarnathu Mana (Pazhamthottam), Olappamanna Illam (Vellinezhi) and Poomulli Mana (Palakkad).
