= Appunni Tharakan =

Indian Kathakali artist (1928–2025)

Nambiarath Appunni Tharakan
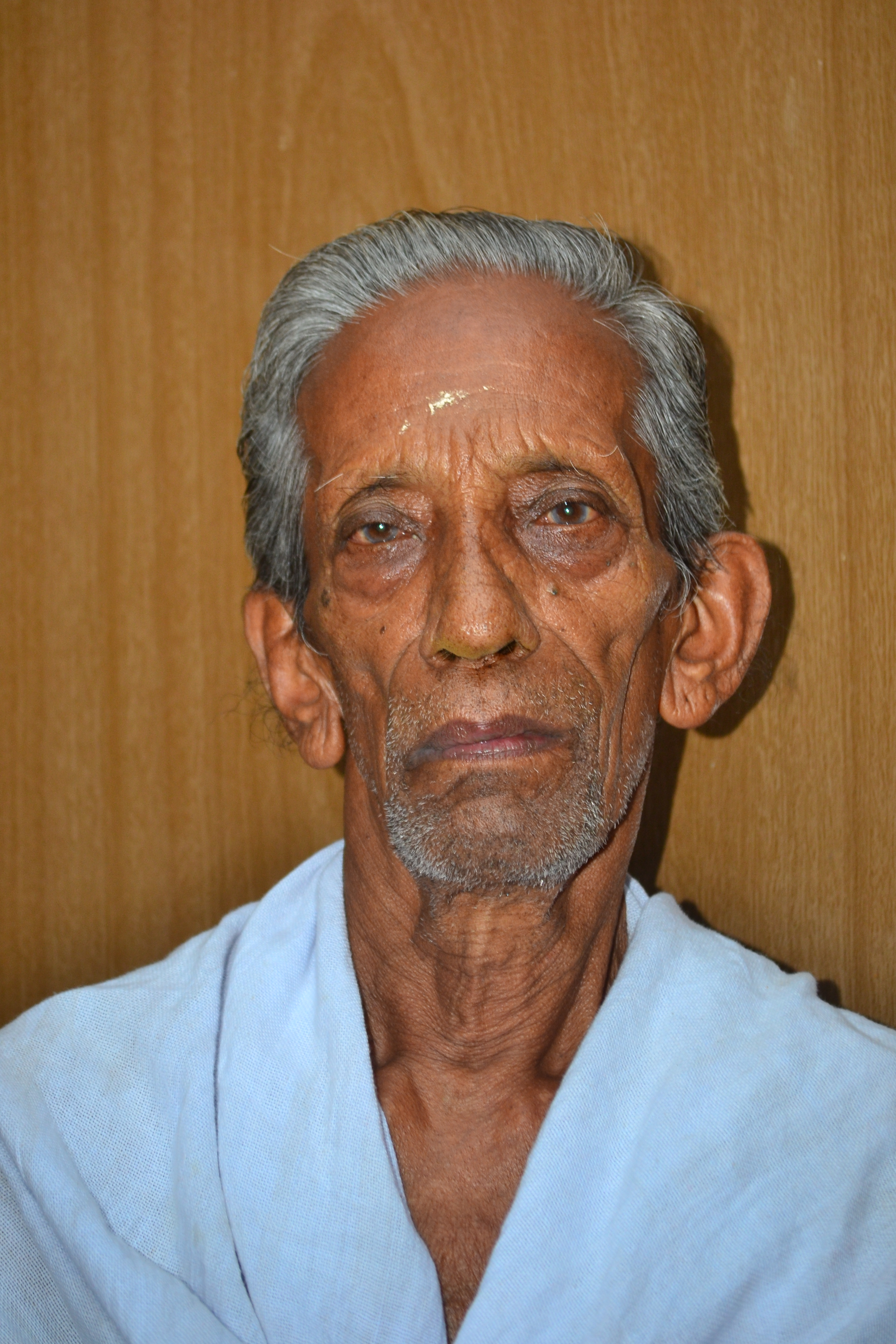
- Born: 3 August 1928; Kothachira, Madras Presidency, British India
- Died: 23 January 2025 (aged 96)
- Occupation: Kathakali makeup artist
- Spouse: Parvathy
- Children: 3
- Parent(s): Kunjan Tharakan; Kutty Pennamma

Nambiarath Appunni Tharakan (23 August 1928 – 23 January 2025) was an Indian Kathakali artist from Kerala. He worked as Uduthukettal (Make up, dressing and costume of Kathakali performer) expert at aniyara (behind the curtains) of Kathakali. Tharakan received several awards including Kerala Sangeetha Nataka Akademi Award, Kerala Kalamandalam Award for Best Kathakali Aniyara Artist and Kerala Kalamandalam Mukundaraja Award.

== Early life and career ==
Nambiarath Appunni Tharakan was born on 3 August 1928, at Mangod near Cherpulassery in present-day Palakkad district, to Kunjan Tharakan and Kutty Pennamma. He dropped out of his education halfway and went to the Vazhengada temple to earn a living. He learned the Uduthukettal from well known Kathakali artist Pambath Sankaran, also known as Kollankode Sankaran, the husband of his sister Kunjimalu Amma. He started his career at the Olappamanna Mana at the age of fourteen. He began working independently at the age of eighteen.

He became a permanent employee of the Kerala Kalamandalam at the age of 50 and retired in 1984. He got a job as Aniyarakkaran (behind the curtain artist) in Kalamandalam with the help of poet Olappamanna Subramanian Namboodiripad who was the president of Kalamandalam at that time. Until then, the post of Aniyarakkaran was not in the Kalamandalam. He was also main Aniyara artist of the Kottayam PSV Natyasangham, the Iringalakuda Unnai Warrier Memorial Kalanilayam and the Perur Sadanam Kathakali Academy. Since the inception of the Kerala State School Kalothsavam in 1953, Appunni Tharakan has been preparing school children for 55 consecutive years.

== Personal life and death ==
Tharakan and his wife, Parvathy, had four children; Unnikrishnan, Sivaraman, Mohanan and the late Sankaranarayanan. Sivaraman is a teacher at the Kerala Kalamandalam. His youngest son Mohanan is an Uduthorukkal artist.

Tharakan died on 23 January 2025, at the age of 96.

== Awards and recognitions ==
- Kerala Kalamandalam Award for Best Kathakali Aniyara Artist, 2021
- Kerala Kalamandalam Mukundaraja Award
- Kalamandalam Krishnan Nair Award
- Kerala Sangeetha Nataka Akademi Award
- Veerasrimgala from Mangod desham
- Vellinezhi Olappamanna Mana Special Award
- Award from Kozhikode Thodayam
- He was honored at the International Kathakali and Koodiyattam Festival in Dubai.
