= Chanakath House =

- ചണകത്ത് തറവാട്
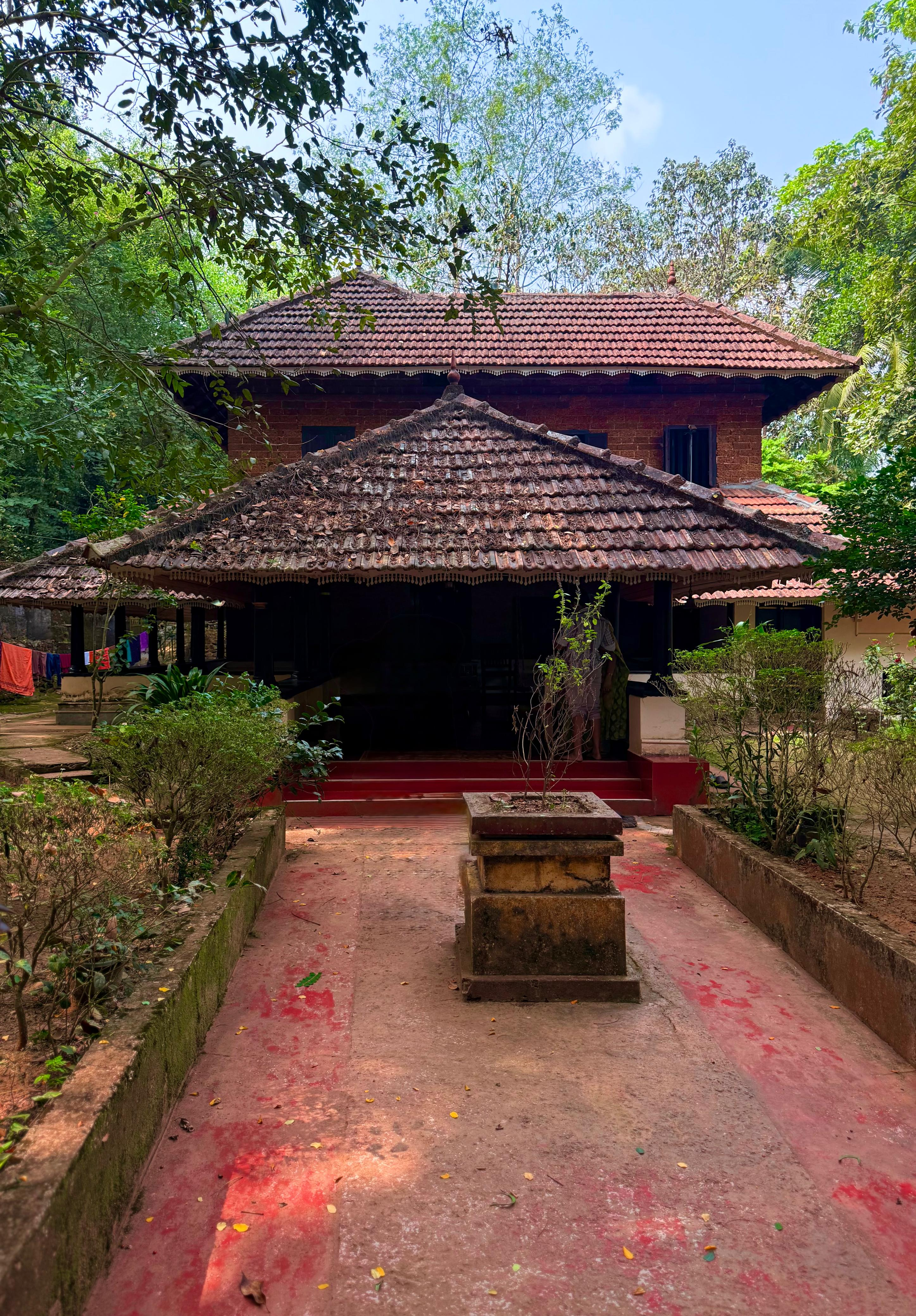
- Alternative names: Chanakath Tharavadu

General information
- Architectural style: Kerala vernacular architecture, Nair tharavadu
- Location: Adakkaputhur, Vellinezhi Panchayat, Palakkad district, Kerala, India
- Completed: c. 1888

Technical details
- Material: Laterite stone, terracotta tiles, wood

Chanakath House (Malayalam: ചണകത്ത് തറവാട്), also known as Chanakath Tharavadu, is a heritage residential building located in Palakkad district, Kerala, India. The house is noted for its traditional Nair-style Kerala architecture and for serving as the model for a full-scale replica exhibited at the Little World Museum of Man in Inuyama, Japan.

== Location ==
The original Chanakath House is situated in Adakkaputhur village, within Vellinezhi Panchayat, Palakkad district, Kerala. It is located approximately 2 kilometres from Kalluvazhi Road, with the Dhanvantari Temple situated opposite the front of the house. The surrounding landscape includes paddy fields, medicinal plants, and native birdlife, reflecting the traditional integration of domestic architecture with the natural environment in rural Kerala.

== History ==
Chanakath House is estimated to be over 138 years old. The house was originally constructed around 1888 by Ravunni Nair and functioned as a traditional tharavadu (ancestral home) under the Nair matrilineal inheritance system (thaivazhi).

Ownership passed through the maternal line to Lakshmikutty Amma, and subsequently to Kunjilakshmi Amma. During Kunjilakshmi Amma’s ownership in the early 1980s, the house attracted international attention.

In 1982, Takahashi, a Japanese engineer associated with the Little World Museum of Man, selected Chanakath House as the model for a Kerala exhibit in Japan. He reportedly stayed at the house for approximately two years while studying its architectural features and supervising the documentation and reconstruction process for the museum replica.

In 2002, the property was purchased by Colonel Rajasekhara Menon of Chennai. He resided in the house for about 14 years, developed the surrounding land with medicinal plants, and renamed the house Vatsalayam.

Since 2016, Chanakath House has been owned by Dr. V. Harilal Nambiar, who has undertaken restoration and conservation efforts aimed at preserving the building’s original architectural character, including work related to the traditional well and water systems.

== Architecture ==
Chanakath Tharavadu follows the traditional Nālukettu, which is one of Kerala vernacular architecture style, which was commonly used for ancestral homesteads (tharavadu) of Nair families in Kerala. A Nālukettu is typically a rectangular structure formed by four interconnected blocks arranged around a central open courtyard known as the Nadumuttam. The Nadumuttam serves as the functional and symbolic center of the house, providing natural light, ventilation, and space for domestic and ritual activities, often surrounded by verandas on all sides.

The four structural blocks surrounding the Nadumuttam are traditionally named based on their orientation: Vadakkini (north), Padinjattini (west), Kizhakkini (east), and Thekkini (south). Chanakath Tharavadu adheres to this spatial organization and is designed in accordance with principles of Vastu Shastra, with kitchens located in the northeast and bedrooms in the southwest.

The house is constructed using vettukallu, laterite stones cut from laterite soil, a material commonly used in traditional Kerala architecture. These stones are bonded using traditional lime mortar and natural binders such as jaggery. Laterite has natural hardening properties that enhance durability and provide effective thermal insulation, helping maintain cooler indoor temperatures in the region’s tropical climate.

The roof is covered with odu, traditional baked red clay tiles, laid in a sloping design. This roofing style offers thermal resistance and provides effective protection against Kerala’s heavy monsoon rainfall. Structural elements such as pillars and door frames are made from hardwoods including teak and rosewood, contributing to the building’s longevity and structural stability.

== Cultural significance ==
Chanakath House is significant as a representative example of the Nair tharavadu system, illustrating Kerala’s historical matrilineal inheritance, domestic organisation, and architectural traditions. Its preservation has been cited in discussions on heritage conservation and traditional residential architecture in Kerala.

== Replica in Japan ==
A full-scale replica of Chanakath House is displayed at the Little World Museum of Man, an anthropological museum and open-air museum located in Inuyama, Aichi Prefecture, Japan. The replica forms part of the museum’s India-themed village.

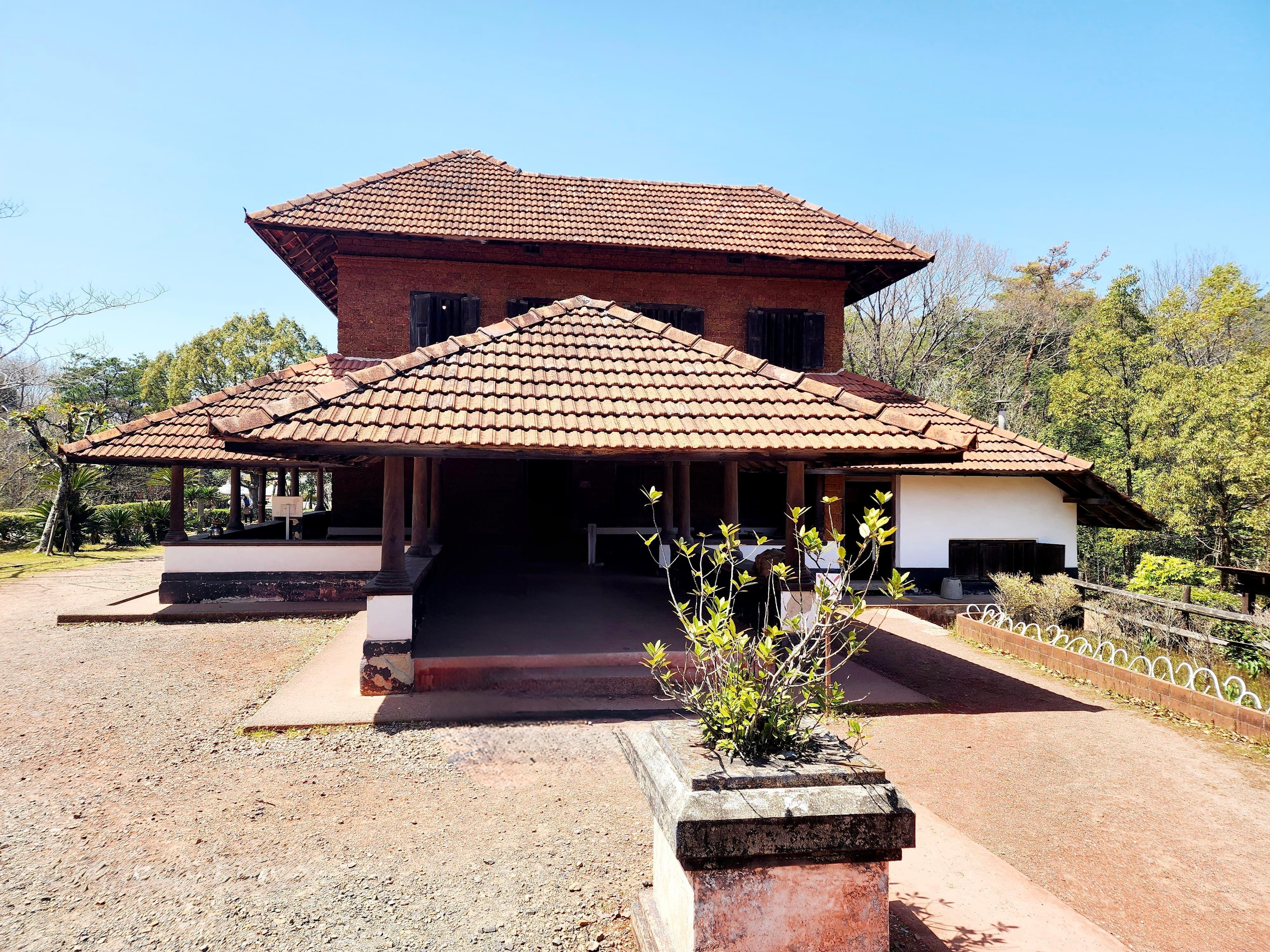
Replica of Chanakath house in Japan

Key features of the replica include:

- Construction during the 1980s under the supervision of Japanese engineer Takahashi
- Use of architectural materials and design elements sourced from Kerala
- Recreation of interior spaces such as the verandah, courtyard, pooja room, and kitchen
- Inclusion of a Kerala-style tea shop, Malayalam signboards, and an Indian-style post office
- Presentation of traditional food items and household objects to contextualize daily life

== Media coverage ==
Chanakath House and its Japanese replica have been featured in Indian media outlets including Manorama Online, OnManorama, and The Better India.

== See also ==
- Kerala architecture
- Nair
- Tharavadu
- Little World Museum of Man
- Vernacular architecture of India
