= Vellinezhi =

- village
- Interactive map of Vellinezhi
- Coordinates: 10.902878°N 76.34394°E
- Country: India
- State: Kerala
- District: Palakkad

Government
  - Chairman: Position Empty

Languages
  - Official: Malayalam, English
- Time zone: UTC+5:30 (IST)
- Postal code: 679504

Vellinezhi is a village located in the Palakkad district of Kerala in southern India.

== Geography ==
The land is located on the banks of the Kunti, a tributary to Bharatapuzha. Vellinezhi is located about 25 km north of Ottapalam in Palakkad district. The nearest small town is Cherpulassery, seven kilometres away.

== Art and culture ==
It is famous for many Kathakali and traditional Kerala percussion artistes.

== History ==
Vellinezhi is one of the fourteen desams (small duchy-like territories) and is home to Olappamanna Mana, a centuries-old feudal Namboothiri (Kerala Brahmin) mansion (Illam). Olappamanna Mana currently operates as a trust that facilitates public events, film productions, and performing arts classes. The trust, known as the Deviprasadam Trust, was established in 1990 by Sri Olappamanna Damodaran Nambudiripad to preserve the cultural heritage of the mana.

The mana was historically associated with Kunjunni Nambudiripad, who received the title of Rao Bahadur from the British authorities. It was also the ancestral home of several notable scholars and literary figures, including the late O. M. C. Narayanan Nambudiripad (known for his Malayalam interpretation of the Rigveda), the poet Mahakavi Subrahmanian Nambudiripad (widely known by his pen name, Olappamanna), and author-scholar Dr. O. M. Anujan.

In the early twentieth century, Pattikkamthodi Ravunni Menon contributed to redefining the aesthetics of the Kalluvazhi tradition of Kathakali at Olappamanna Mana. Following the death of Sri O. M. C. Narayanan Nambudiripad, his son Sri Olappamanna Damodaran Nambudiripad undertook efforts to preserve the heritage of the mana and promote its cultural significance internationally until his death.

=== Political history ===
Vellinezhi was originally part of the Nedunganad Swaroopam dynasty, which ruled over large parts of present-day Pattambi and Ottapalam taluks. By the late fifteenth century CE, Nedunganad came under the control of the Zamorin of Calicut, the principal ruler of the South Malabar region. The Zamorin appointed a local chieftain based at Kavalappara Kovilakam to administer the area. During the British Raj, the region formed part of Walluvanad Taluk in the Malappuram Revenue Division of the Malabar District, with its administrative headquarters at Perinthalmanna.

== Temples ==
Centred around the cultural patronage of the Olappamanna Mana and the locally known temples such as Kanthalloor Kshethram and Chenginikottu Kavu, Vellinezhi has developed a reputation as a hub for several classical Kerala art forms. Among these, the most prominent is the dance-drama Kathakali, whose technical precision and aesthetic refinement reached significant levels during the period of Pattikkamthodi Ravunni Menon, who enhanced and systematised the Kalluvazhi style.

His disciples, along with playback musicians, percussionists, make-up (chutti) artists, and costume (petti) designers trained under him, contributed to establishing Vellinezhi’s artistic identity. The village also includes a residence named Kothavil, known for its expertise in designing and producing Kathakali costumes.

== Notable people ==
1. Vishnu Achutha Menon, Filmmaker, Author and Researcher

== See also ==
- Walluvanad Taluk
