= Trikkatiri =

- Country: India
- State: Kerala
- District: Palakkad district

Languages
  - Official: Malayalam, English
- Time zone: UTC+5:30 (IST)
- PIN: 679502
- Vehicle registration: KL-51
- Nearest Town: Cherpulassery

Trikkatiri, alternatively spelt as Thrikkadeeri is a town in Ottapalam Taluk, Palakkad district, Kerala state, India. It is located in the route from Ottapalam to Perinthalmanna. There is a famous temple dedicated to Trimurtis of Hindu pantheon - Brahma, Vishnu and Shiva - here. Popularly known as Moonnumoorthi Temple, it has a rare idol with three faces representing the three deities. The village is famous for that phenomenon.

== Transportation ==
This town connects to other parts of India through Palakkad city. National Highway No.544 connects to Coimbatore and Bangalore. Other parts of Kerala is accessed through National Highway No.66 going through Thrissur. Calicut International Airport, Cochin International Airport and Coimbatore Airport are the nearest airports. Shoranur Junction railway station is the nearest major railway station.
