= Kalamandalam Kuttan Asan =

Indian Kathakali exponent (1938–2022)

- Born: 1938; Adakkaputhur, Cherpulassery, Palakkad District, British Raj
- Died: 13 January 2022 (aged 84); Perinthalmanna, Malappuram District, India
- Occupation: Kathakali exponent
- Spouse: Leelavati
- Children: 3
- Parent(s): Kuttappa Panikar, Ammukuttyamma

Kalamandalam Kuttan Asan (also spelled as Kalamandalam Kuttanasan, 1938 – 13 January 2022) was an Indian Kathakali artiste from Kerala. He was known as Dakshan Kuttan as he was popular in the role of Daksha. He received awards including the Sangeet Natak Akademi Award 2008 and Kerala State Kathakali Award 2019.

== Biography ==
Kuttan Asan was born in 1938 to Kuttappa Panikar and wife Ammukuttyamma at Adakkaputhur in Cherpulassery, Palakkad district. After completing his diploma in Kerala Kalamandalam in 1951 under Kalamandalam Ramankutty Asan and Kalamandalam Padmanabhan Nair, Kuttanasan made his debut in 1951 at the Vellinezhi Kanthalloor Temple. Joining as Kathakali teacher at the Iringalakuda Unnayivaryar Memorial Kalanilayam in 1964, he became the Vice Principal of Kalanilayam in 1990 and became the Principal in 1995.

He was known as Dakshan Kuttan as he was popular in the role of Dakshan. In Kathakali, Kuttan Asan excelled in Pacha and Kathi roles, as well as in Kattalan, Brahmin, Balabhadra and Roudrabhima roles. For forty years he performed the role of Vibhishana in Sreerama Pattabhikam (consecration of Lord Rama) kathakali on the stage at the Koodalmanikyam temple festival.

=== Personal life and death ===
Kuttan Asan and his wife Leelavati had three children, Usha Madhumohanan, Sati Radhakrishnan and Geetha Madhu. He died in Perinthalmanna on 13 January 2022, at the age of 84.

== Awards and honors ==
- Sangeet Natak Akademi Award,
- Kerala State Kathakali Award 2019
- Kerala Kalamandalam Keerthi Patram
- Kaladarpana Award
- Amruthandamayi mat puraskar
- Kerala Kalamandalam Award, 2007
- Kalamandalam Krishnan Nair Award, 2010
- Kalamandalam Pattikamthodi Ramunnimenon Award, 2011
- Unnayivaryar Award, 2011
- Visakhapatnam Nataraja Dance Music Academy Natyasree Award, 2002
- Thrissur Kathakali Club Award, 2000
- Vellinezhi Panchayat Gramakala Award, 2015
- Kerala Kalamandalam Fellowship, 2019
