= Varikkasseri Mana =

Traditional mansion in Kerala known numerous film appearances

- വരിക്കാശ്ശേരി മന
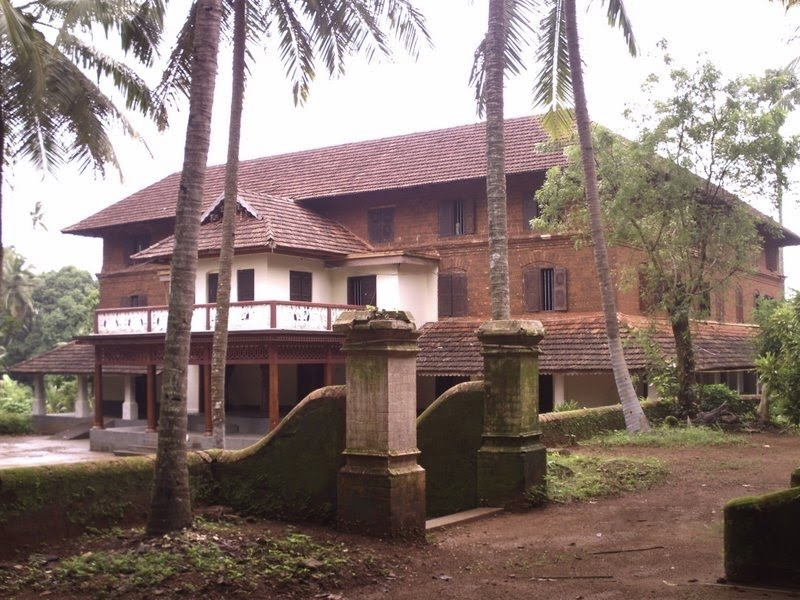

- Location within Kerala
- Alternative names: Varikkumanchery Mana

General information
- Architectural style: Kerala Architecture
- Location: Manissery, Ottappalam, Palakkad, Kerala, India
- Coordinates: 10°46′16″N 76°20′14″E
- Estimated completion: 1902
- Owner: Varikkasseri Krishnan Namboodiripad

Height
- Roof: Roof tiles

Technical details
- Structural system: Red stone
- Floor count: Three

Design and construction
- Architect: Krishnan Thampuran

Other information
- Number of rooms: 74 in the main building

Varikkasseri Mana, alternatively known as Varikkumanchery Mana, is a mansion belonging to Namboothiri nobility in Valluvanad region of Kerala. Built in traditional Kerala architectural on a plot of land measuring approximately 4 acres, the building is located at Manissery, a village in Ottapalam in Palakkad. It is a popular shooting location for films including Devasuram, Narasimham (film), Aaraam Thampuran, Rappakal and Aranmanai 4.

== Profile ==
The Varikkasseri family is reported to have a history of over 1000 years and the family is known to have occupied a sovereign position among Ashta gruha (Eight Families) Namboothiri families. The Mana was built by Varikkassery Ravi Namboothirippad in or about 1902, using locally available red stone. An expansive padippura (gate house) provides the entry to the three-storied building complex which comprises a nalukettu with 74 rooms, two pathayappuras (outhouses), a large pond and the adjoining bath house, a family temple complex consisting three temples of Shiva, Krishna and Ayyappan, and an oottupura (dining hall), which has since been demolished. It was designed by Krishnan Thampuran, also known as Shilpi Thampuran, of Varikkasseri family, who had earlier studied architecture in Chennai and his exposure to western architecture is seen in the design of the building, especially in the long slender columns surrounding the portico of the building. The beams, doors and windows are made out of wood and are adorned with intricate carvings.

The house was used in a number of Malayalam films, starting with Theertham, the 1987 film made by Mohan. It is reported that the principal photography of over 100 films have been done here which include Devaasuram, Aaraam Thampuran, Narasimham, Ravanaprabhu, Rappakal, Anandabhadram, Chandrolsavam, Drona, Simhasanam, Madampi, Sufi Paranja Katha, Jana, Thooval Kottaram, Kaavalan, Kaaryasthan, Villain, Manthrikan, Pretham 2, Shylock and Bramayugam. Visitors are allowed in the complex when no film is being shot, but access to the ritually pure thevarapura is restricted to Brahmins who intend to perform rituals. The mana is maintained and managed by a trust formed by the current owners of the property, consisting of 10 of the 25 original heirs and some investors who purchased the rights from the remaining 15 heirs.

Varikkassery Krishnan Nampoothirippad was the sculptor who built the portico for this house in 1940s.

== Location ==
The Mana is located at Manissery, in Ottappalam, around 42 km from Palakkad, in the south Indian state of Kerala. The nearest railway station is Ottapalam railway station but one may also reach the place via Shornur railway station which is 13 km away. Kozhikode International Airport is the entry point by air, which is situated 62 km away from the Mana.

== Gallery ==
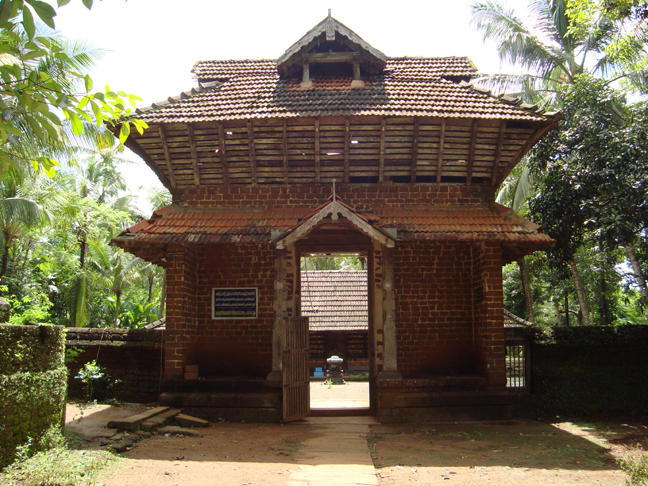
Entrance

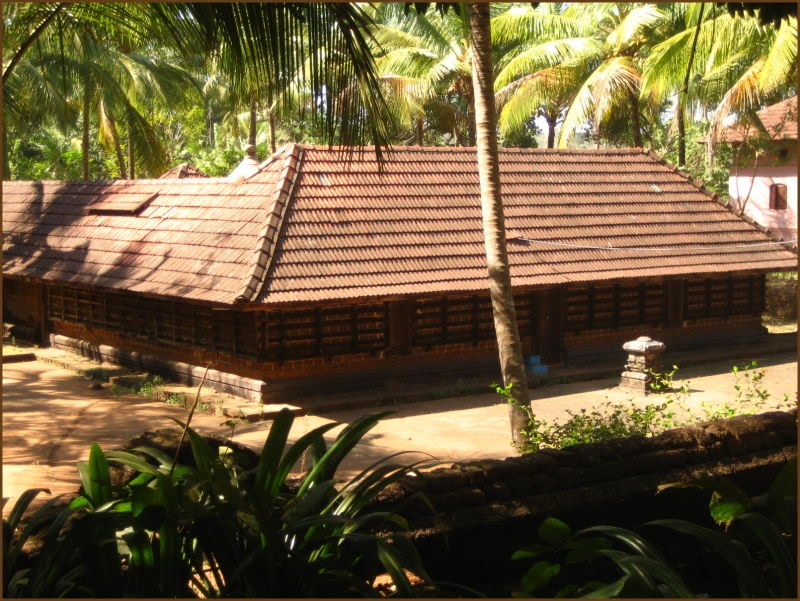
Varikkasseri temple

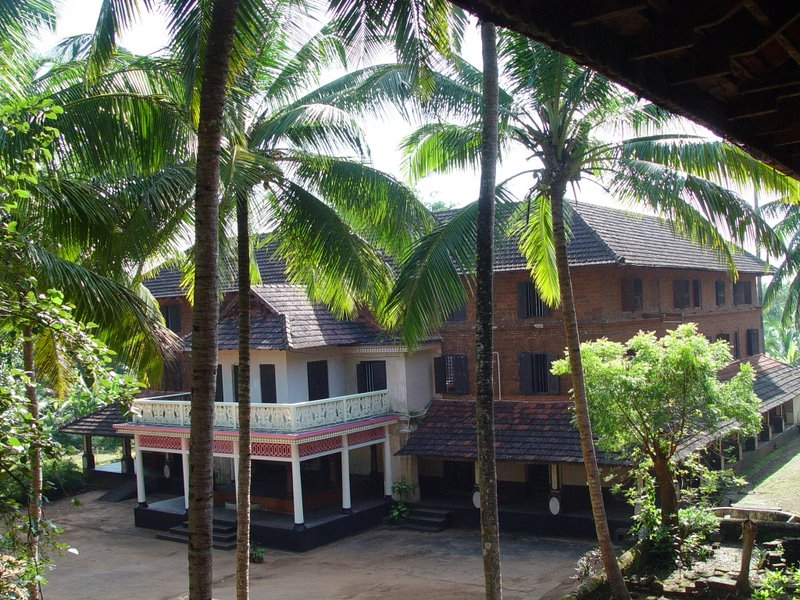
Nalukettu

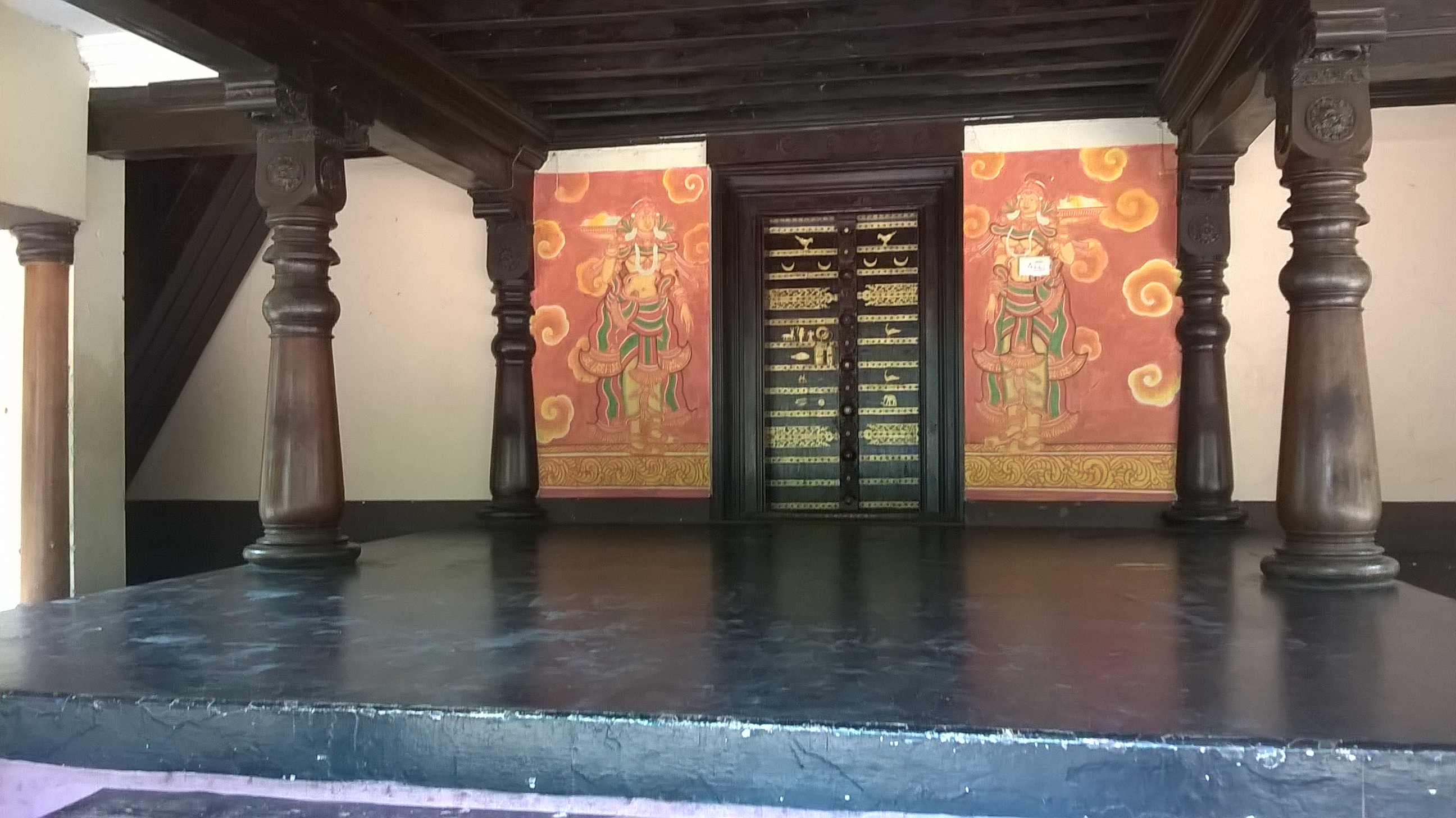
Verandah

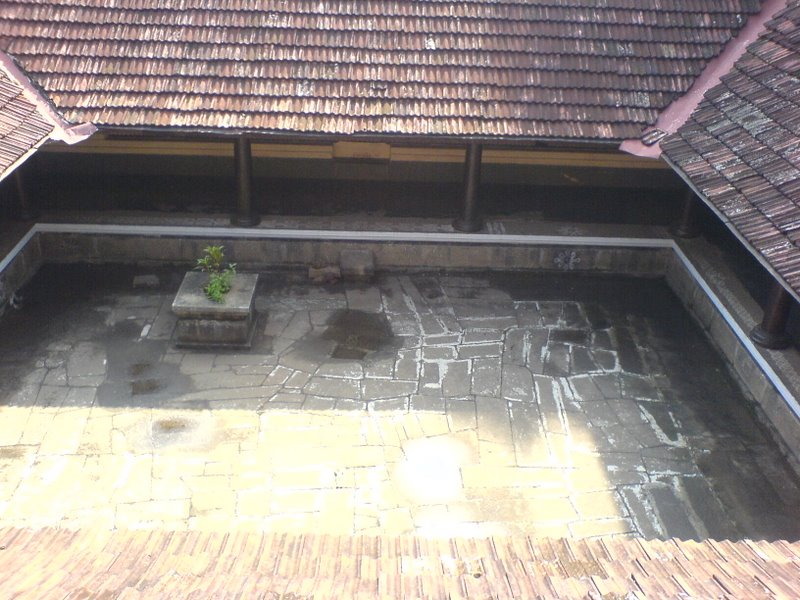
Courtyard

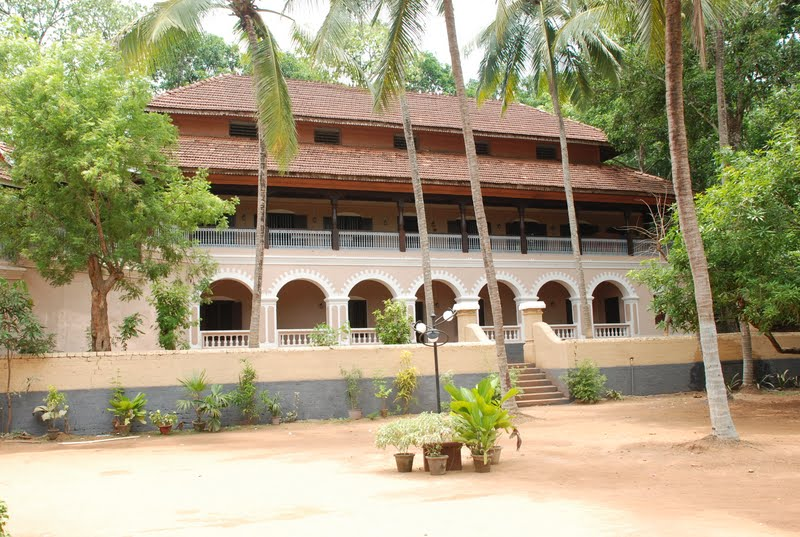
Out-house

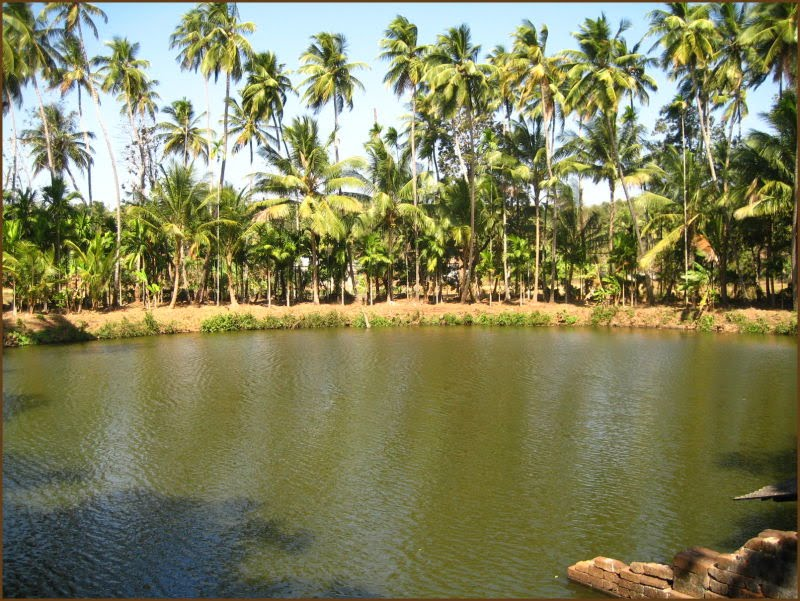
Family pond

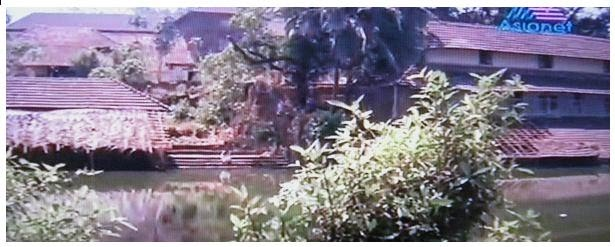
Bath house

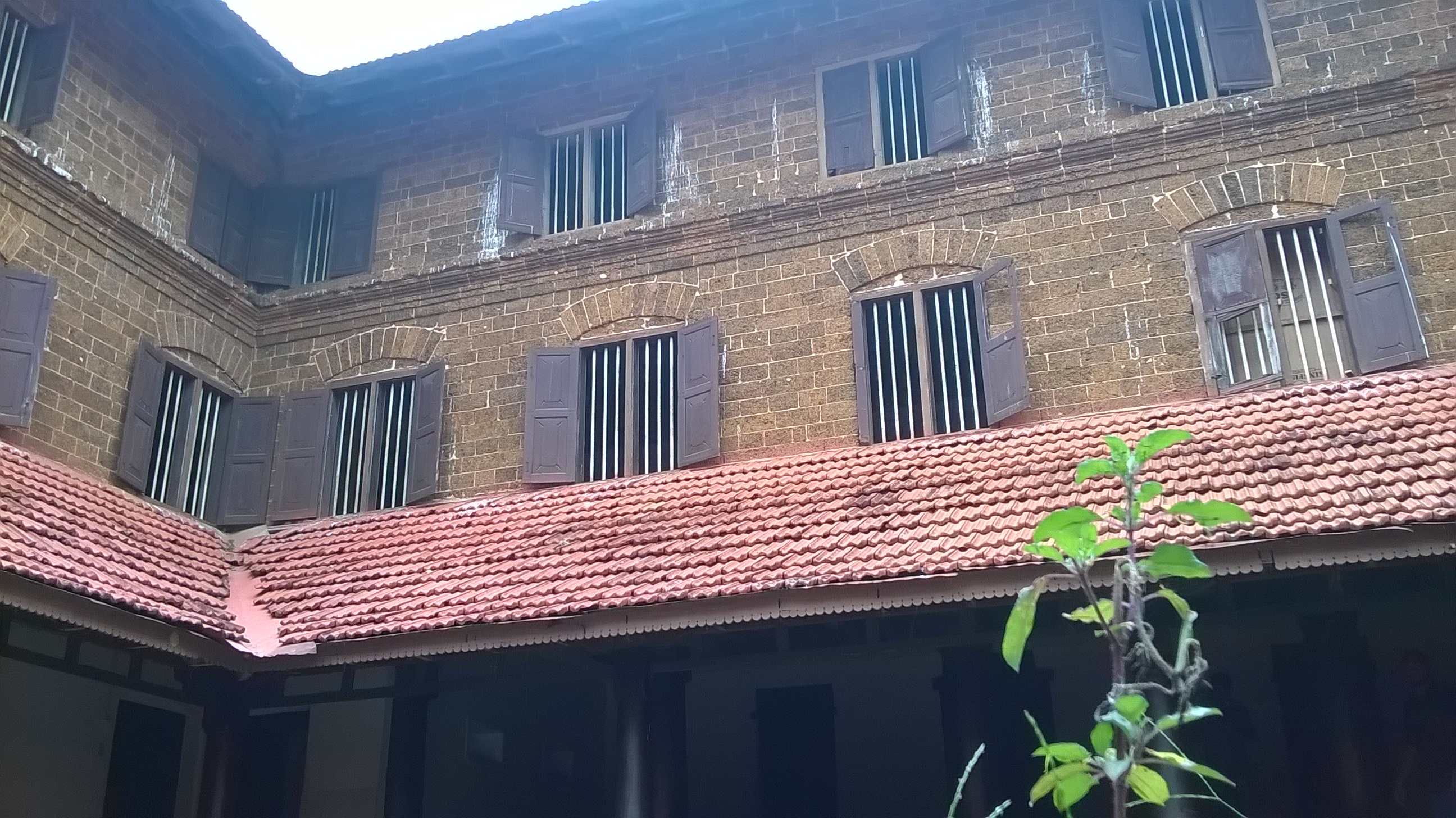
A view from inside

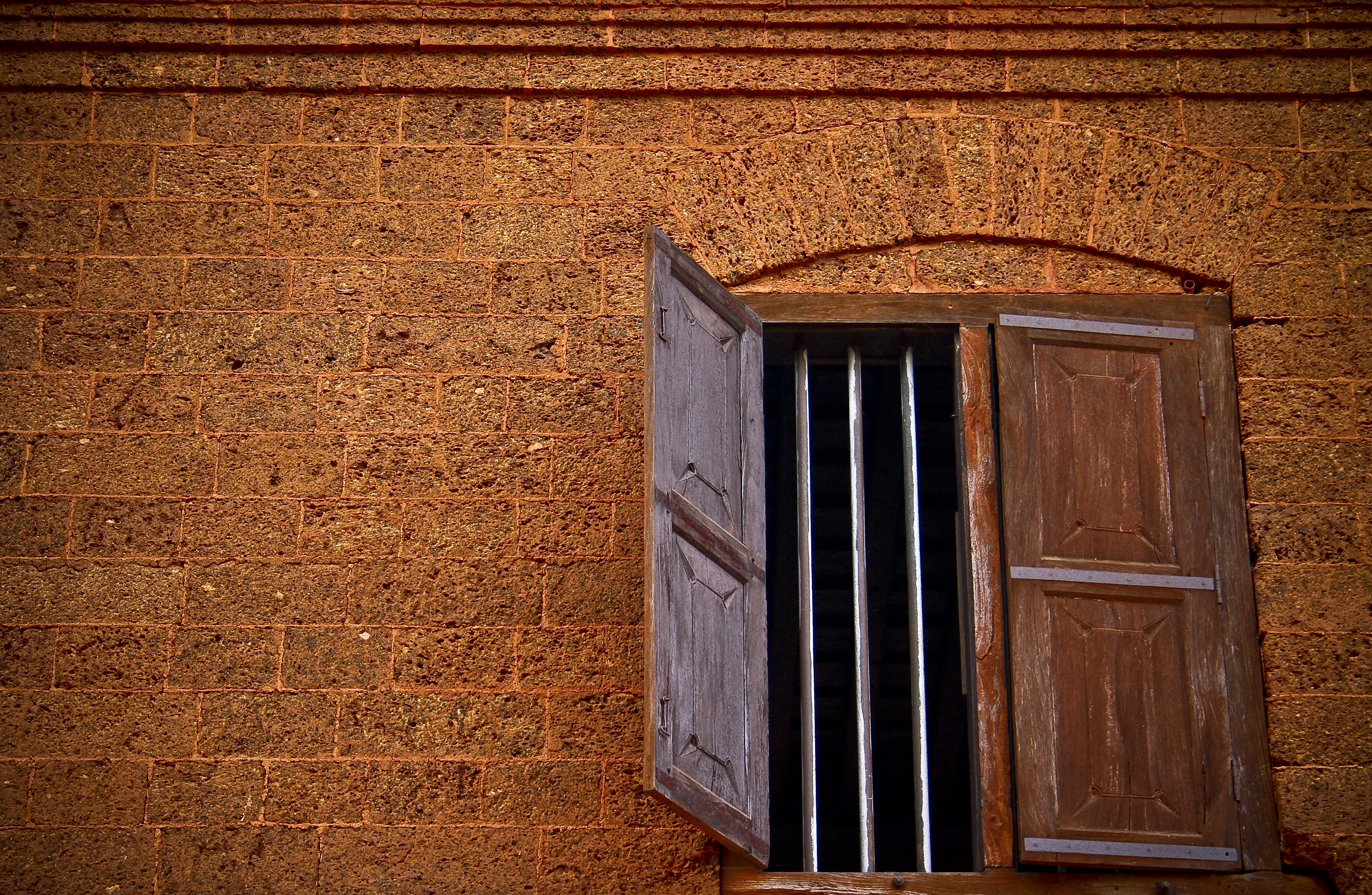
The red stone wall and a window

== See also ==
- Olappamanna Mana
