= O. M. Anujan =

Indian poet

- Born: Chitrabhanu Namboothirippad; 20 July 1928 (age 98); Vellinezhi, Palakkad district, Kerala
- Occupations: Poet, Kathakali scholar, Academic
- Spouse: Savithri
- Children: Valsala, Suja, Sreelatha
- Parent(s): Neelakantan Nabuthirippad (father), Devasena Antharjanam (mother)
- Relatives: Olappamanna (brother)
- Writing career
- Notable awards: Kerala Sahitya Akademi Award for Outstanding Contribution in Malayalam literature

Olappamanna Mana Chitrabhanu Namboothirippad (born 20 July 1928) better identified as O. M. Anujan, is an Indian poet, Kathakali scholar, and academic from Kerala. He was one of the founding members of International Center for Kathakali, New Delhi. In 2018, he received the Kerala Sahitya Akademi Lifetime Achievement (Samara Sambhavana) Award. Anujan has written 10 poetry collection, 5 attakathas (texts for Kathakali performance) one short story collection and one travelogue.

== Biography ==
Anujan was born in Vellinezhi Olappamanna Mana in Palakkad district. His mother was from Vadakkancheri Mana. Poet Olappamanna is his elder brother. Due to lack of study facilities in Vellinezhi that time, he joined the school at Ottapalam at the age of 10 only. His birth name was Chithrabhanu. However, being the youngest of eight siblings, he decided to take the name Anujan (which means younger brother in Malayalam) when he joined the school.

After passing intermediate from Victoria College, Palakkad, he completed bachelor's degree in Economics from Madras Christian College. After that he studied post graduate degree in Malayalam Literature from the University College, Thiruvananthapuram, and later a doctorate under Sardar KM Panicker. After retirement he settled in Ernakulam city, and there he became part of Ernakulam Kathakali Club.

== Academic career ==
He worked as lecturer in Presidency College, Chennai and then joined as Malayalam professor in Delhi University, later he became head of the Department of Modern Indian Languages, University of Delhi. After retirement he himself participated in the research and evaluation of doctoral theses by students from various universities.

== Literary contributions ==
=== Autobiography ===
- Jeevitham Kavyam (Life as Poem)- It is written in second or third person narration style

=== Poetry collection ===
- Srishti
- Vaishakham
- Nagarashilpikal
- Chilluvathil
- Agadhaneelimakal
- Mukulangal
- Megham
- Aaktheyan
- Malayalichi
- Madhuvum Ramayum Rajavum

=== Attakatas ===
- Bhavadevacharithram (Based on Vallathol's Poetry)
- Meghasandesham
- Urvasi Purooravass
- Yayati
- Bharatastreekal than bhavashudhi

=== Short story collection ===
- Kaviyude kadhakal

=== Travelogue ===
- Poorva Europilekku oru samskarika paryadanam

== Awards ==
- 2018: Kerala Sahitya Akademi Lifetime Achievement Award
