= Olappamanna Mana =

Heritage building in Vellinezhi, India

- Location within Kerala

General information
- Architectural style: Kerala Architecture
- Location: Vellinezhi, Cherpulassery, Palakkad, Kerala, India
- Coordinates: 10°54′12″N 76°20′38″E
- Owner: Deviprasadam Trust

Olappamanna Mana is a heritage building, the ancestral home of a Nambuthiri family by name, Olappammanna. The building, an Ettukettu, constructed in Kerala architectural style, is situated in Vellinezhi, a village on the banks of Kunthipuzha River, in Cherpulassery of Palakkad district in the south Indian state of Kerala. The building is around 24 km from Ottapalam railway station and the nearest airport is Calicut International Airport which is 57 km away.

== Profile ==
Olappamanna Mana is the ancestral home to Olappamanna Nambuthiri family, in the village of Vellinezhi, situated on the banks of Kunthipuzha, in Cherpulassery, Palakkad district, in the south Indian state of Kerala. The building, an ettukettu (a building with eight sections linked together by two courtyards) housed in a 20-acre plot, is known have been built in 18th century and is surrounded by verdant land. Some portions were added later which are also around 200 years old (as of April 2019). Once a vibrant hub, Olappamanna Mana now functions as a trust, ensuring its continued vitality through hosting public events, film shoots, and performing arts classes. Established in 1990 by Sri Olappamanna Damodaran Nambudiripad to preserve the mana's rich cultural heritage, the Deviprasadam Trust oversees its operations. The place has now been converted into a home stay since 2006, managed by Olappamanna Damodaran Nambudiripad, and the facility offers cultural tourism. The principal photography of four Malayalam films, Aaram Thamburan, Parinayam, Aakasha Ganga and Thanmathra, were done on the premises of the Mana.

The Mana, which was frequented by the noted Kathakali performer, Pattikkamthodi Ravunni Menon, assisted him in promoting Kalluvazhi chitta, one of the traditions of Kathakali and Olappamanna Kaliyogam, a Kathakali school which propagated the tradition, functioned from the Mana premises until it was relocated to Kerala Kalamandalam by Vallathol Narayana Menon, the founder of the institution. Known to have promoted the cultural, literary and linguistic traditions of Kerala, the Mana gave birth to a number of scholars, art connoisseurs and writers; O. M. Narayanan Nambuthiripad (1838–1902), O. M. Neelakandan Nambuthiripad (1863–1935), both Sanskrit scholars and vedic teachers, O. M. Vasudevan Nambuthirpad (1881–1926), the author of Dhruva Charitham Kathakali drama, O. M. Narayanan Nambuthiripad (1890–1944), holder of Raobahadur title and a member of the Madras State Legislative Council, O. M. Parameshwaran Nambuthiripad (1899–1942), the publisher of Sahithi, a magazine exclusively for Malayalam poems, O. M. C. Narayanan Nambuthiripad (1910–1989), the Sanskrit scholar who translated Rig Veda into Malayalam and the author of Snapaka Yohannan, a play for Kathakali, O. M. Subramanian Nambuthiripad (1923–2000), better known as Olappamanna, the noted Malayalam poet and a recipient of several honours including Kendra Sahitya Akademi and Kerala Sahitya Akademi awards, O. M. Anujan (1928–), poet, Kathakali scholar and academic, Leela Nambuthiripad (1934–), better identified as Sumangala, the noted writer of children's literature, and Eminent Psychiatrist Dr.O.N.Vasudevan (1940–2002) feature among the descendants of Olappamanna family. It was also reported that Chembai Vaidyanatha Bhagavatar, the noted Carnatic musician, used to teach at the Mana.

A book has been written on the Mana, by N. P. Vijayakrishnan, which details the history, architecture and socio-cultural contributions of the members of the family; the book has foreword written by M. T. Vasudevan Nair, the Jnanpith laureate.

== Location ==
Mana is situated along Ambadi-Para Road, off Ottapalam-Mannarkkad Road, in Vellinezhi, near Mavulliparambu Ayyappan Temple. The rail access is via Ottapalam railway station, around 14 km away and Kozhikode International Airport, the nearest airport, is 57 km away from the building.

== See also ==
- Varikkasseri Mana
