= Nālukettu =

Traditional housing style in Kerala

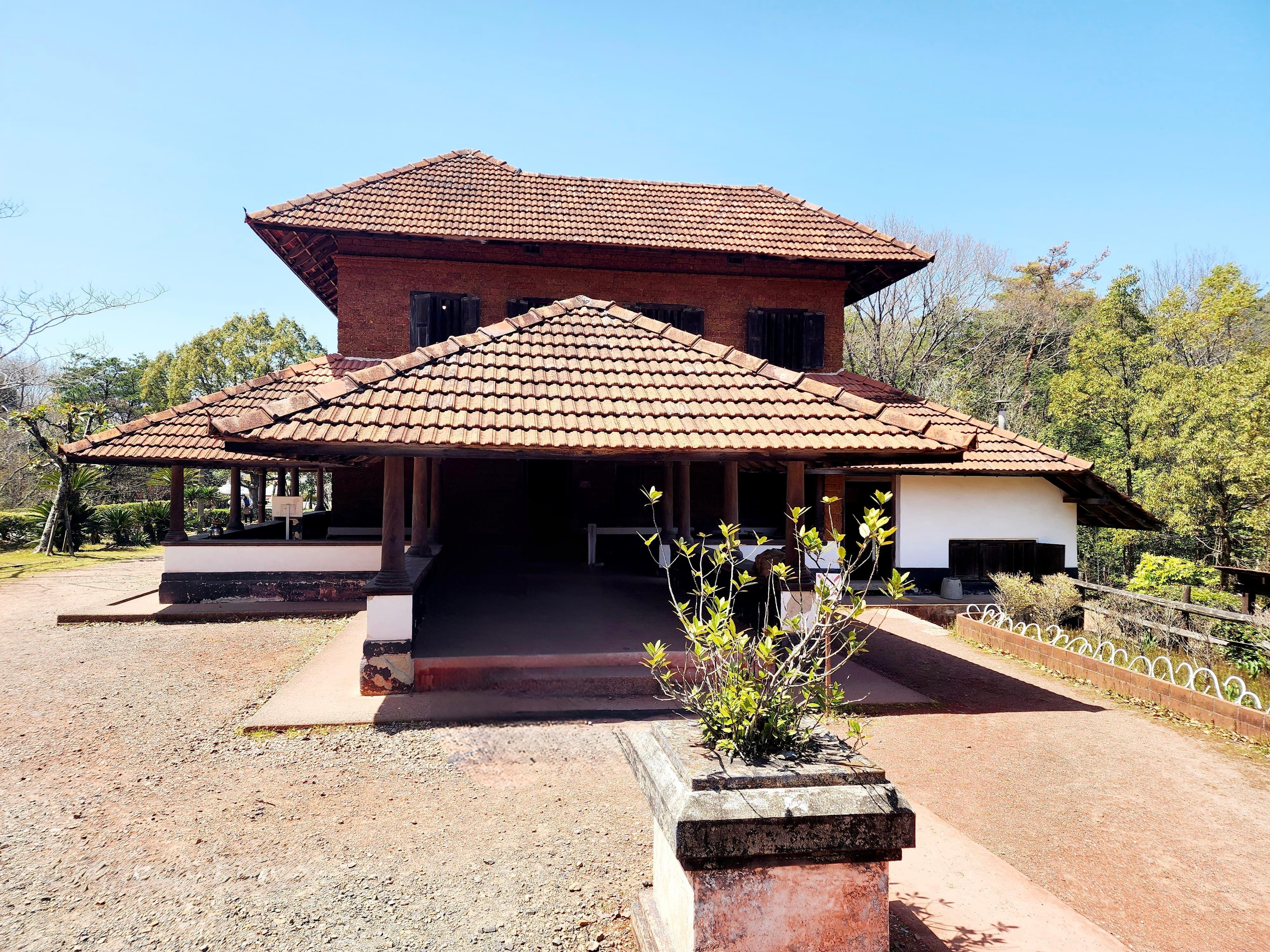
A replica of Chanakath house (Nalukettu) at Little World Museum of Man, Inuyama, Japan.

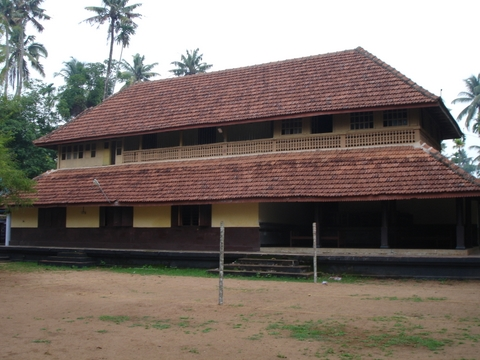
An example of a Nalukettu(Paliam, Cochin)

A Nalukettu

Nālukettu is the traditional homestead of old Tharavadu where many generations of a Nambudiri and Nair family lived. These types of buildings are typically found in the Indian state of Kerala. The traditional architecture is typically a rectangular structure where four halls are joined with a central courtyard, or Nadumuttam, open to the sky. The four halls on the sides are named Vadakkini (northern block), Padinjattini (western block), Kizhakkini (eastern block) and Thekkini (southern block). The architecture was especially catered to large families of the traditional tharavadu, to live under one roof and enjoy the commonly owned facilities of the marumakkathayam homestead.

Little World Museum of Man, an open-air museum and amusement park near Inuyama, Japan features a Nalukkettu Tharavad.

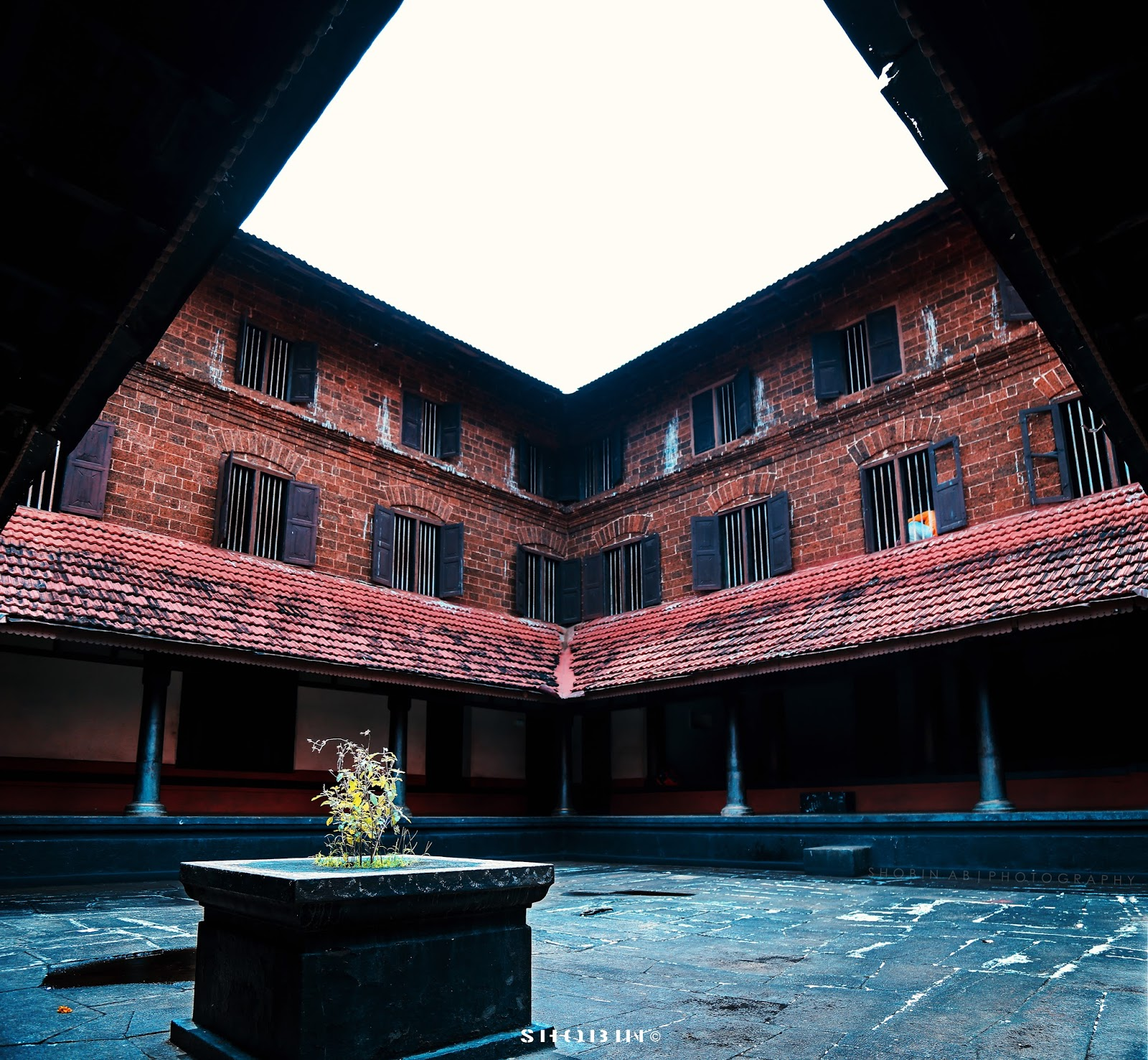
A nadumuttam.

== Construction and Materials ==
Thachu Sastra, or the Science of Carpentry and Traditional Vasthu, was the governing science in this architectural form. This branch of knowledge was well developed in the traditional architecture of Kerala and has created its own branch of literature known under the names of Tantrasamuchaya, Vastuvidya, Manushyalaya-Chandrika, and Silparatna.

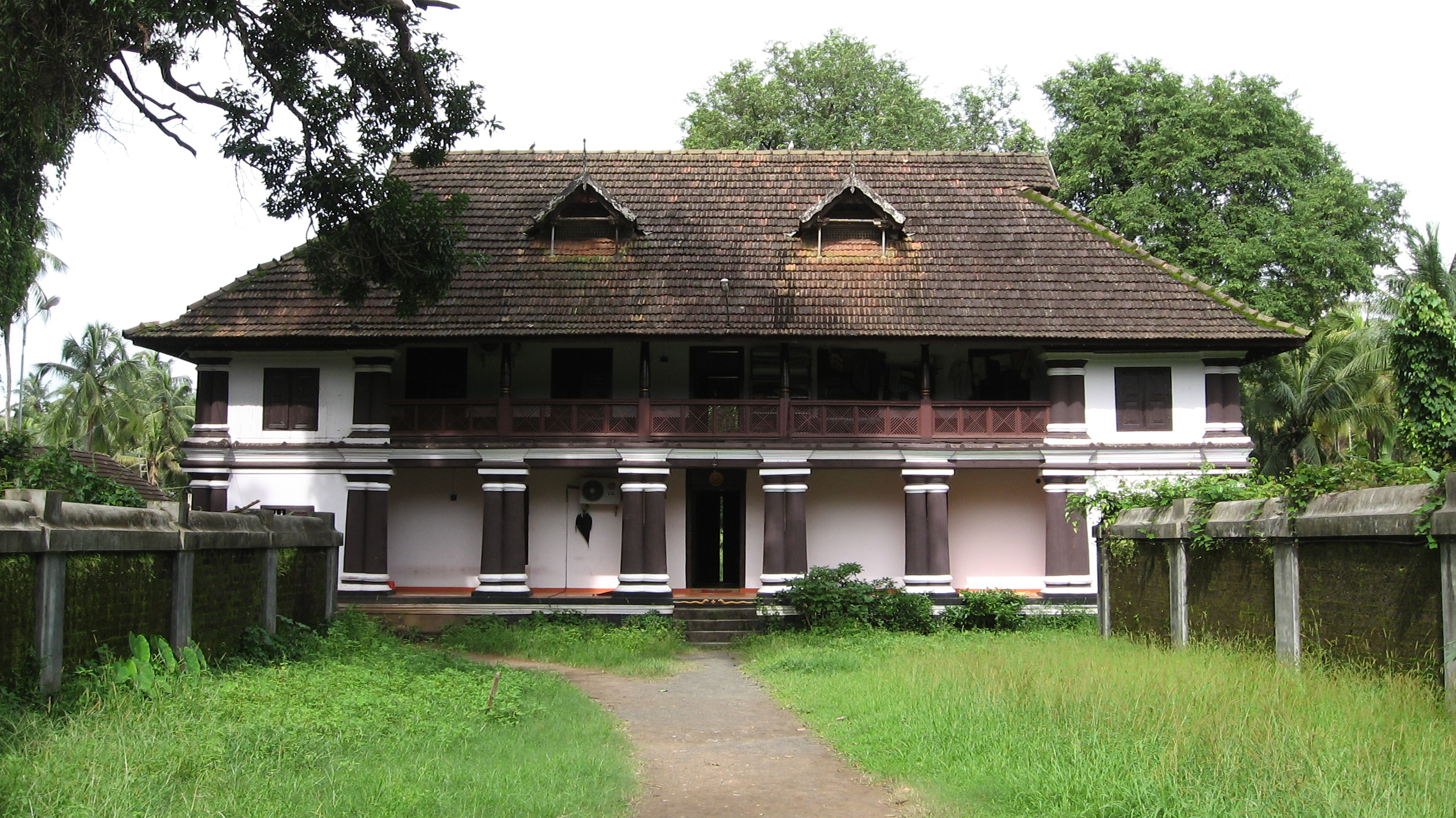
An ettukettu.

The layout of these homes is simple, and catered to the dwelling of the large number of people usually part of a tharavaadu. Ettukettu (eight halled with two central courtyards) or Pathinarukettu (sixteen halled with four central courtyards) are the more elaborate forms of the same architecture. Rarely, twelve-halled Pathrandukettu were constructed. with three courtyards, and there is a record of a 32-halled Muppathirandukettu being erected, although it was lost to a fire soon after construction. Every structure faces the sunlight, and in some well-designed naalukettu, there is excellent ventilation. Temperatures, even in the heat of summer, are markedly lower within the naalukettu.

Locally available materials such as laterite stone, wood, clay tiles, and lime plaster were used, making the houses naturally suited to Kerala’s humid tropical climate. Sloping tiled roofs ensured proper drainage during the monsoon, and the wooden framework usually displayed finely detailed craftsmanship.

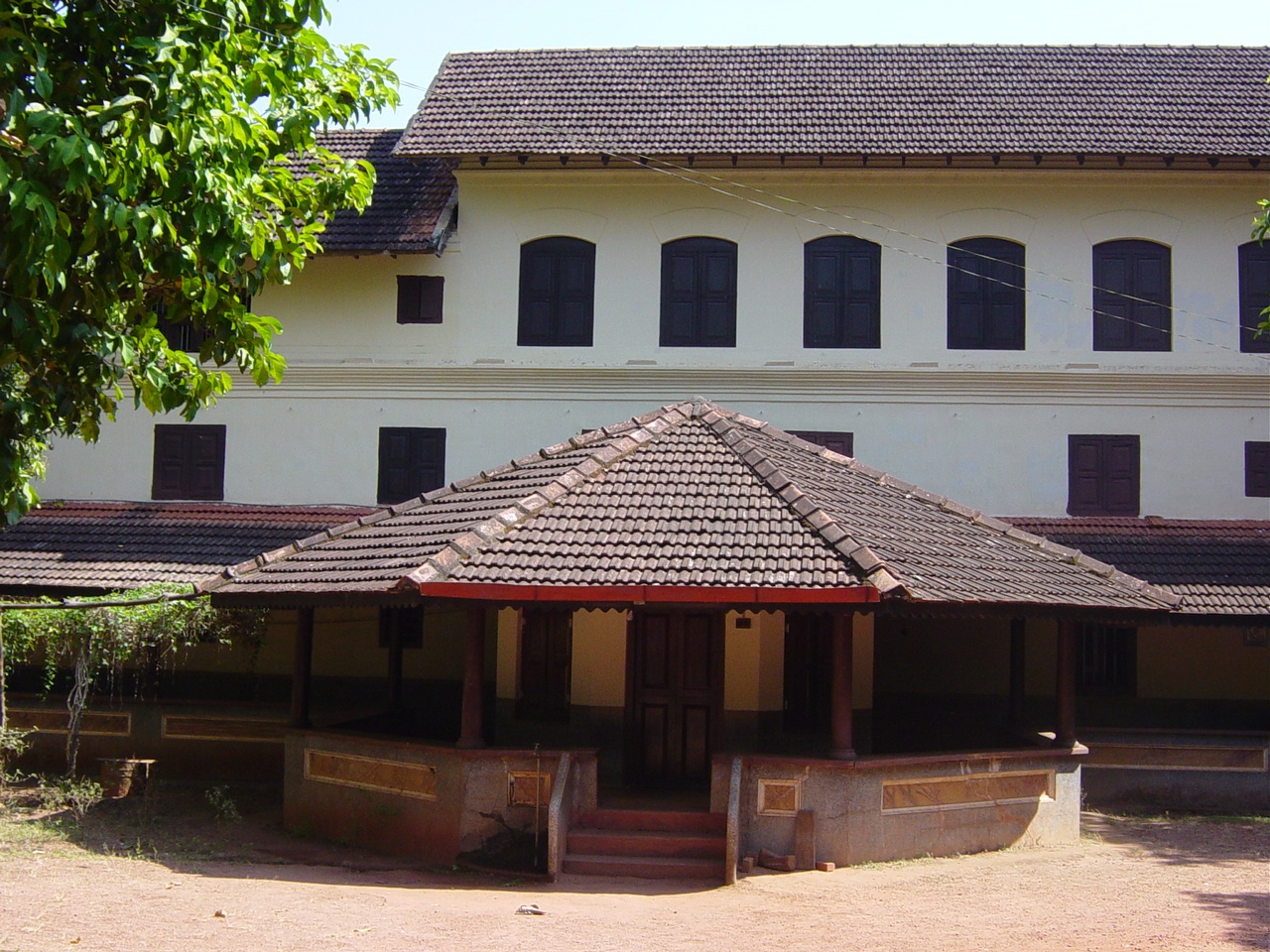
Maranat Mana, one of the few surviving pathinarukettu
