= Olappamanna =

Indian poet (1923–2000)

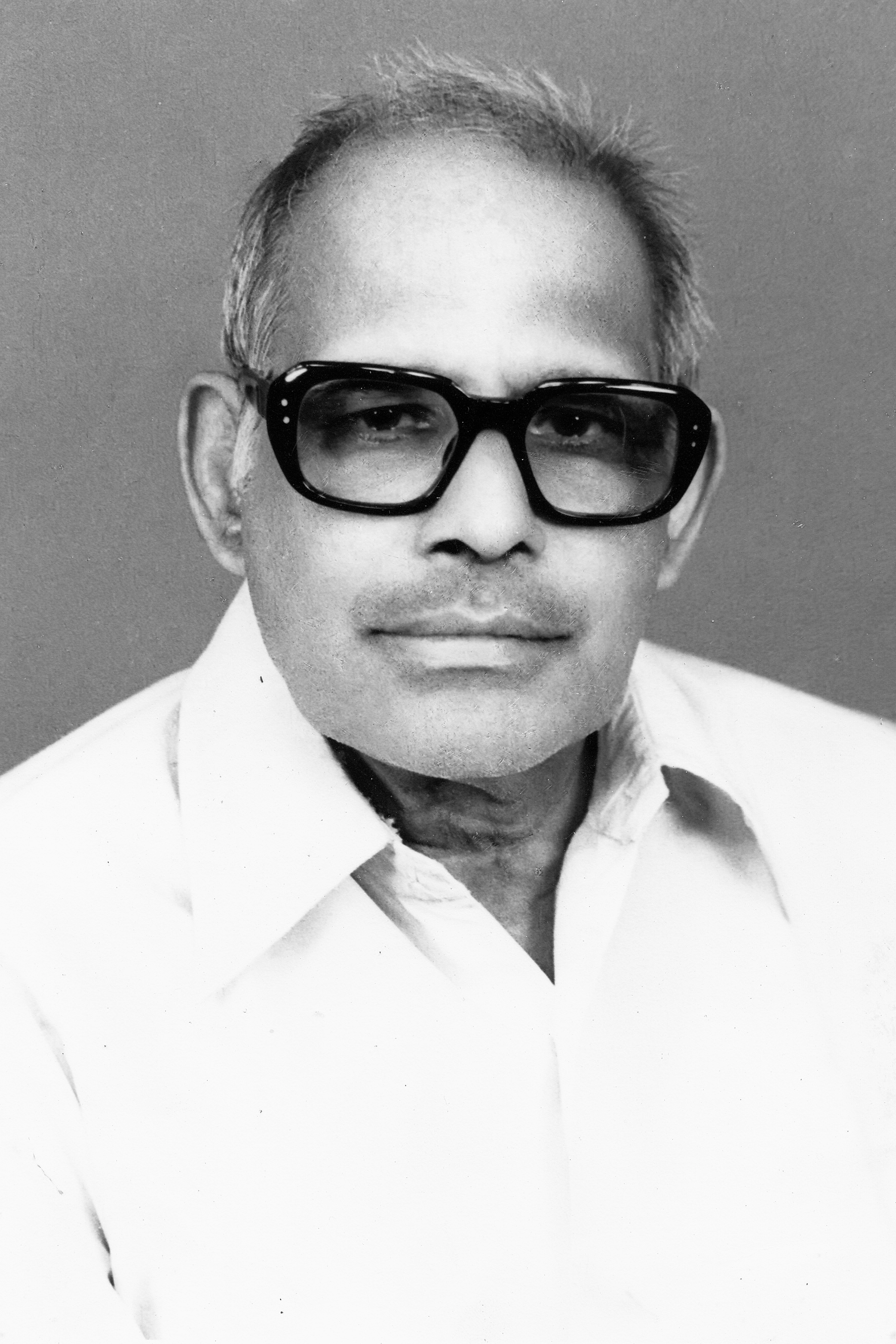
- Born: Subramanian Namboothirippad; 10 January 1923
- Died: 10 April 2000 (aged 77)
- Occupation: Poet
- Notable work: Nizhalana; Kathakavithakal; Nangemakutty; Theethailam; Kilungunna Kaiyyamam
- Spouse: Sreedevi Antharjanam
- Parents: Neelakantan Nambuthirippad; Devasena Antharjanam
- Relatives: O. M. Anujan (Brother); Sreedevi Bindu Olappamanna (Granddaughter); Leela Nambudiripad (Niece); O. M. C. Narayanan Nambudiripad (Nephew)
- Awards: 1950 Government of Madras Poetry Prize; 1967 Kerala Sahitya Akademi Award for Poetry; 1989 Kendra Sahitya Academy Award; 1988 Odakkuzhal Award; 1992 N. V. Puraskaram; 1998 Kerala Sahitya Akademi Award for Overall Contributions; 1998 Asan Smaraka Kavitha Puraskaram; Ulloor Award

Olappamanna Mana Subramanian Namboothirippad (10 January 1923 – 10 April 2000), better identified by his family name, Olappamanna, was an Indian poet of Malayalam literature. A former chairman of Kerala Kalamandalam and an author of 20 books of poetry, his poems were noted for their explicit social expressions. He received two awards from Kerala Sahitya Academy and another from Kendra Sahitya Academy, besides honours such as Government of Madras Poetry Prize, Odakkuzhal Award, N. V. Puraskaram, Asan Smaraka Kavitha Puraskaram and Ulloor Award.

== Biography ==
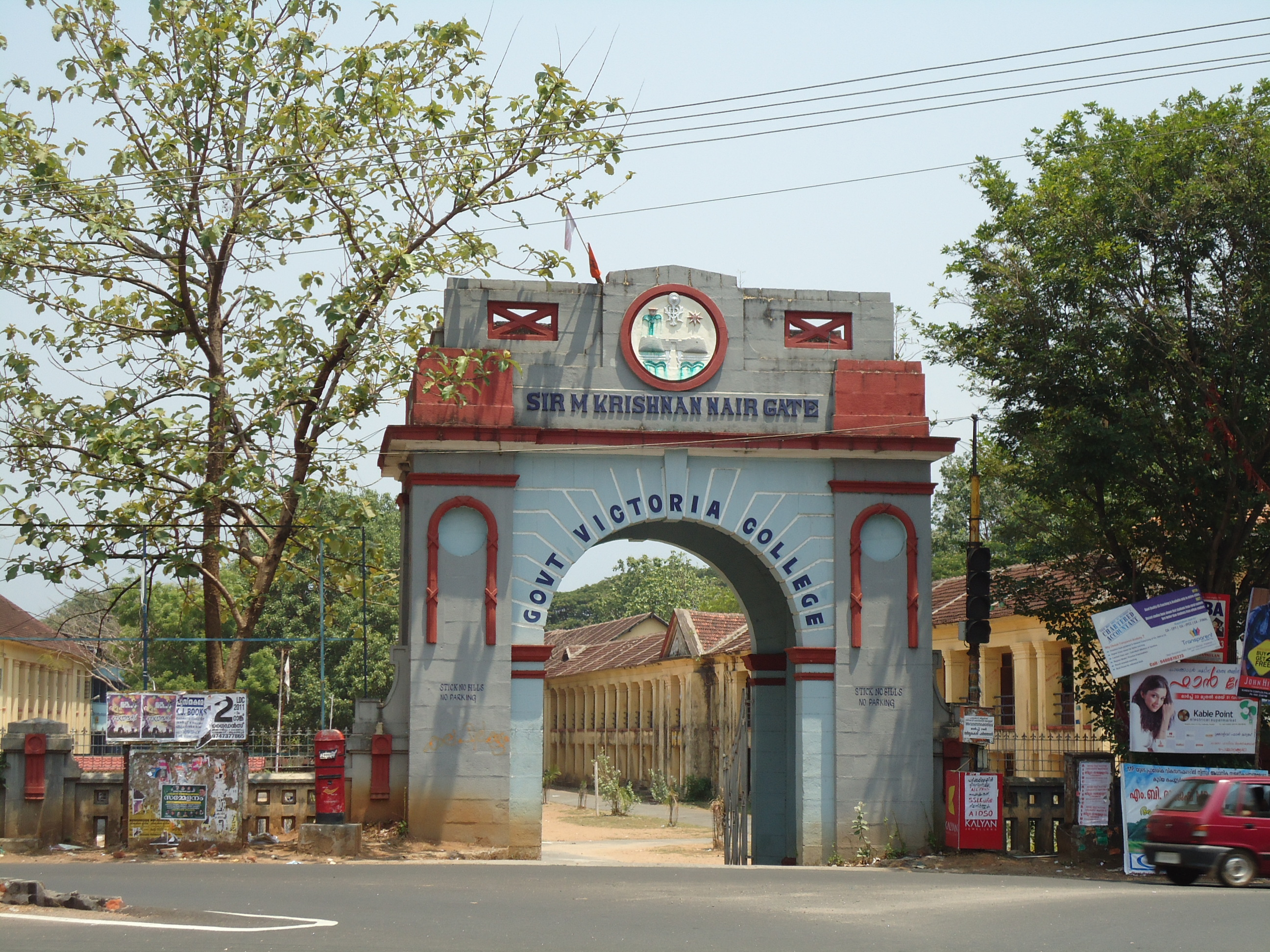
Government Victoria College Palakkad, Olappamanna's alma mater

Olappamanna was born on 10 January 1923, in Vellinezhi in Palakkad district of the south Indian state of Kerala in Olappamanna Mana, a wealthy family with a feudal past known for its patronage of artists and musicians to Neelakantan Nambuthirippad and Devasena Antharjanam. After the customary early education of Sanskrit and vedas, he completed schooling in 1944, studying in Ottappalam School, P. M. G. High School, Palakkad and B. E. M. High School, Palakkad, and joined the Government Victoria College, Palakkad for his undergraduate studies in History but did not complete it. Later, he was engaged in timber and rubber businesses and was involved in local politics, presiding over Ezhakkad Panchayat and Kottoppadam Panchayath, during the period from 1950 to 1964.

Olappamanna, who was married to Sreedevi, died on 10 April 2000, at the age of 77, succumbing to a massive heart attack. O. M. Anujan, the noted scholar and poet was his brother while Leela Nambudiripad, the writer of children's literature, popularly known as Sumanagala, O. M. C. Narayanan Nambuthirippad, the Sanskrit scholar and Olappamanna Damodaran Nambudiripad (Founder and Former Chairperson of Deviprasadam Trust) were his niece and nephews respectively.

== Legacy ==
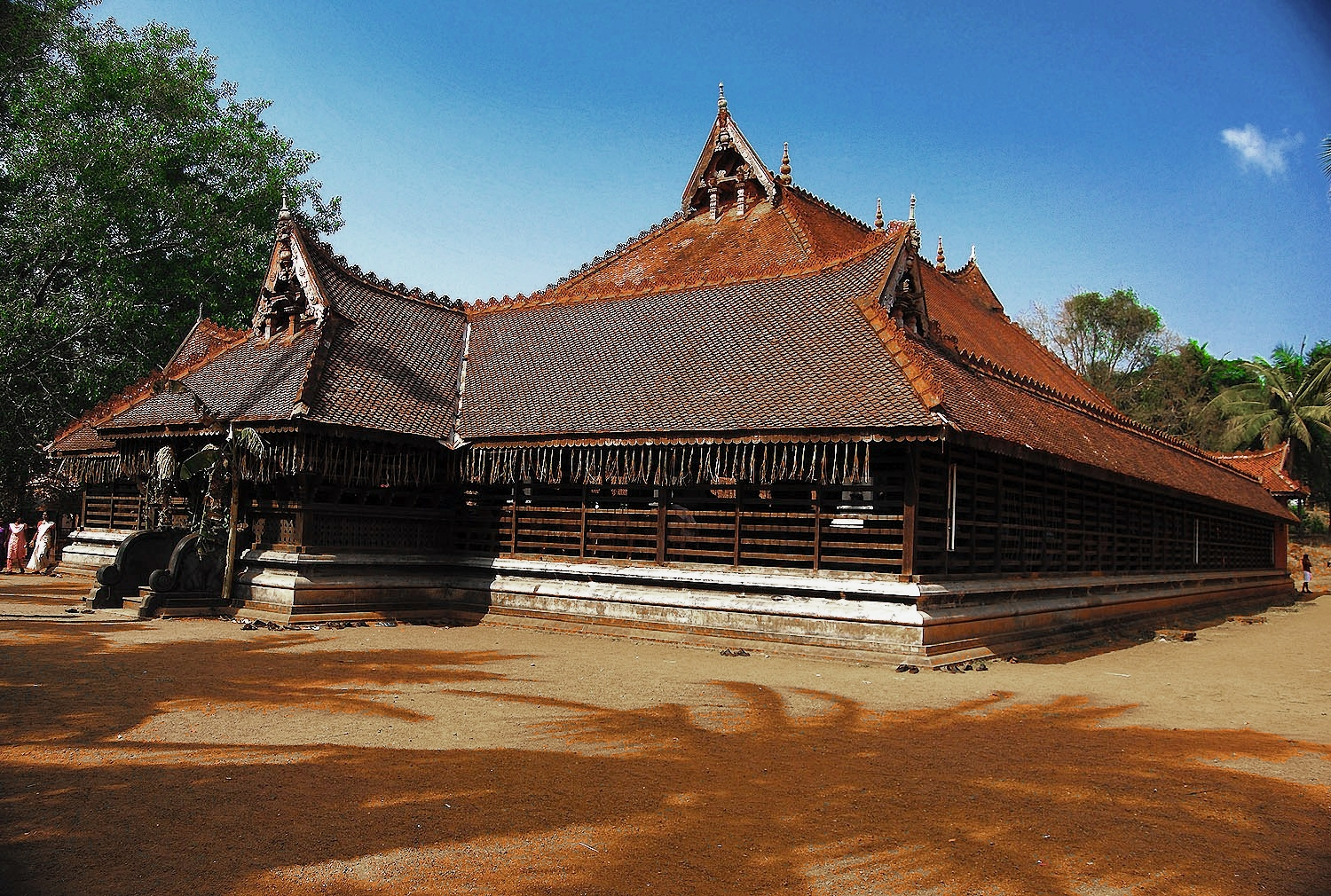
Kerala Kalamandalam

Olappamanna published his first poem in 1942 and his oeuvre comprises 21 books of poetry which include award winning titles such as Kathakavithakal and Nizhalana. Three of his books, Theethailam, Panchali and Nangemakutty are Khanta Kavyams and Amba, is an attakatha. Orkkuka Vallappozhum, the 2009 Malayalam film, has one of Olappamanna's poems, adapted as a song by M. Jayachandran, and sung by himself and Sujatha Mohan.

Olappamanna was associated with Kerala Kalamandalam, holding the position of its vice chairman and later chairing the institution during 1978–84. He was also associated with Yogakshema Sabha and Purogamana Sahithya Samkhadana for a brief period and sat in the director board of Sahitya Pravarthaka Sahakarana Sangham, a writers' cooperative, from 1965 to 1974 and in the Indian Council for Cultural Relations, New Delhi from 1979 to 1984.

== Awards and honours ==
Olappamanna received the Government of Madras Poetry Prize in 1950 for his work, Ashareerikal. The Kerala Sahitya Akademi selected his poetry anthology, Kathakavithakal, for their annual award for poetry in 1967 and he received the Odakkuzhal Award in 1988, his book, Nizhalana, fetching him the award. The book earned yet another award a year later, the 1989 Kendra Sahitya Akademi Award. Six years after receiving the N. V. Puraskaram in 1992, Kerala Sahitya Akademi honoured him again with the Kerala Sahitya Akademi Award for Overall Contributions in 1998; the same year as he received the Asan Smaraka Kavitha Puraskaram. He was also a recipient of the Ulloor Award.

== Bibliography ==
- Olappamanna (1973). Amba (Aattakkadha). Kalamandalam: Kalamandalam.
- Olappamanna. Aehi Soonari: Kavithakal. Author.
- Olappamanna. Olichupookunna Njan: Kavithakal. Kottayam: S.P.C.S.
- Olappamanna. Nangemakkutti: Kavitha.
- Olappamanna (1125). Kulambadi. Mangalodayam: Mangalodayam.
- Olappamanna (1993). Varinellu. D.C. Books, Kottayam: D.C. Books, Kottayam.
- Olappamanna (1987). Nizhalana. Current Books, Kottayam: Current Books, Kottayam.
- Olappamanna (2014). Nithyakalyani: Olappamannayude sampoorna kavithakal. Kozhikode: Mathrubhumi books. ISBN 9788182662025.
- Olappamanna. Suphala: kavithakal. Kottayam: S.P.C.S.
- Olappamanna. Kadhakavithakal. Thrissur: Mangalodayam.
- Olappamanna (2014). Kadhakaliyude rangasree (1st ed.). Kozhikode: Mathrubhumi Books. ISBN 9788182660137.
- Olappamanna (1980). Dhukhamavuka sukham. Sahitya Pravastha Co. operative society: Sahitya Pravastha Co. operative society.
- Olappamanna (1988). Jalakapakshi. Mathrubhoomi, Kozhikode: Mathrubhoomi, Kozhikode.
- Olappamanna (1951). Theethailam. Mangalodayam: Mangalodayam.
- Olappamanna (1948). Kalpana. Mangalodayam: Mangalodayam.

- Veena
- Kilungunna Kaiyamam
- Asareerikal
- Panchali
- Elathalam
- Rubberwifum Mattu Kavithakalum

== See also ==
- List of Malayalam-language authors by category
- List of Malayalam-language authors
