= Tharavad =

Common house for the joint family system practised in Kerala, India

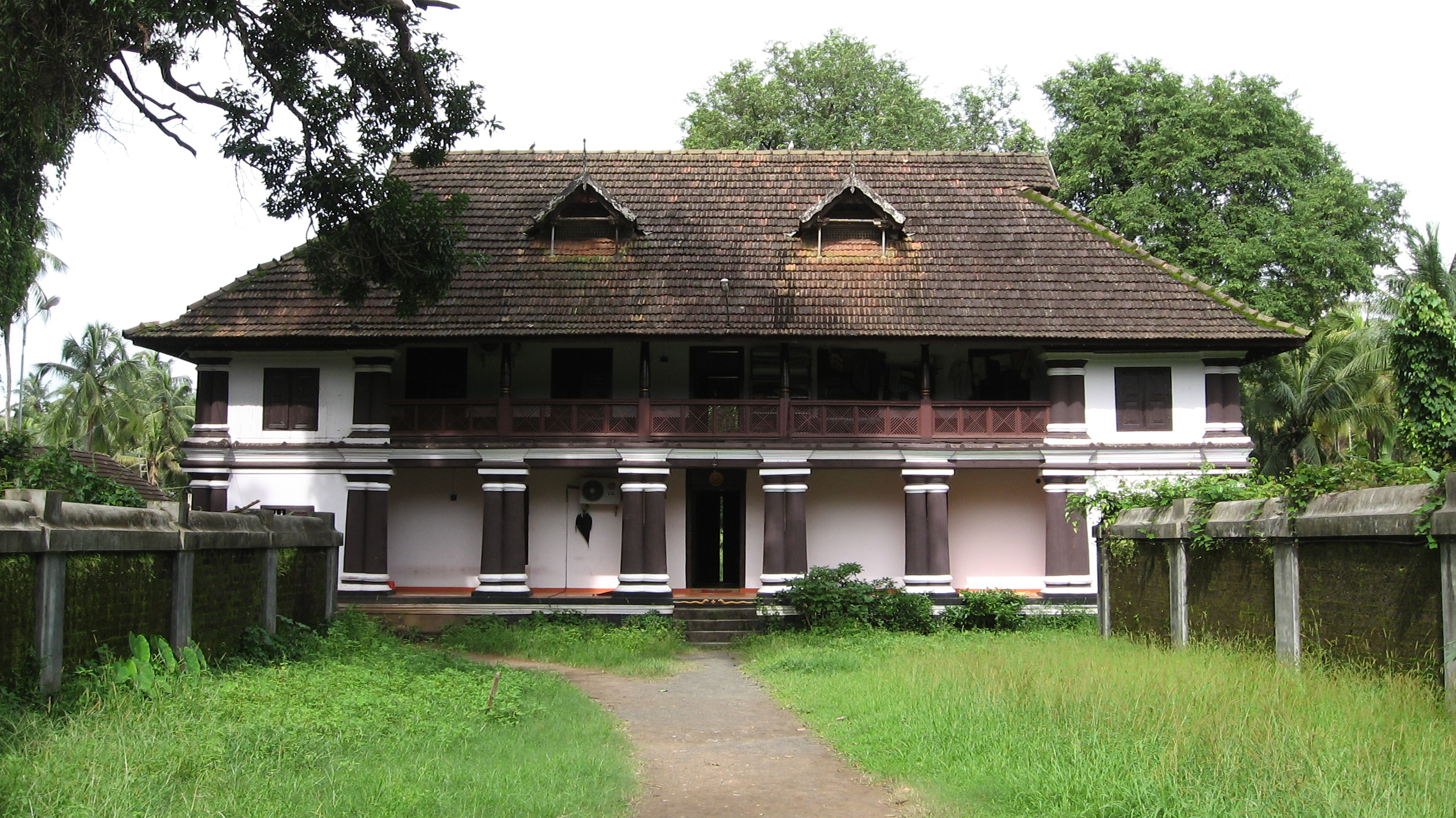
An eight-halled ettukettu tharavad

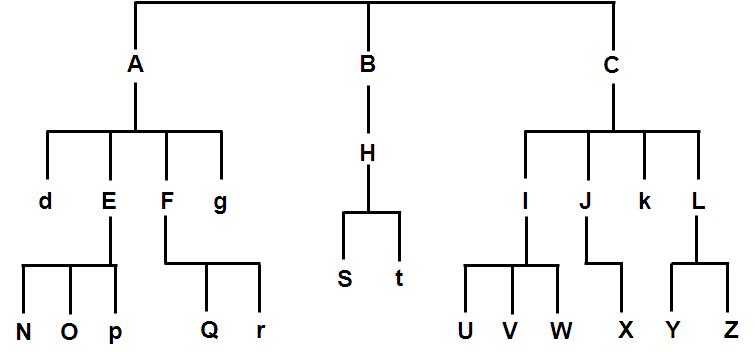
A typical tharavadu reproduced from K. M. Panikkar's article published in 1918. Capital and small letters represent females and males respectively. Supposing that the females A, B and C were dead and the oldest male member karnavar being d, if the male members t, k and others demanded partition, the property would be divided into three parts.

Tharavad, also spelled as Tharavadu (തറവാട്), is the Malayalam word for the ancestral home of aristocratic Nair families in Kerala, which usually served as the common residence for the matrilineal joint family under the Marumakkathayam system practiced in the state. German linguist Hermann Gundert, in his Malayalam—English dictionary published in 1872, defines a Tharavadu as, "An ancestral residence of land-owners and kings", and also as, "A house, chiefly of noblemen". It was classically the residence of Jenmimar, but contemporary usage of the word is now more generic to all social classes and religions in Kerala. By extension, the word refers not just to the family's house but also to the extended family that shares that house. Heads of tharavadus - usually the eldest living male - were known as Karnavars, and junior members as Anandravans.

== Architecture ==
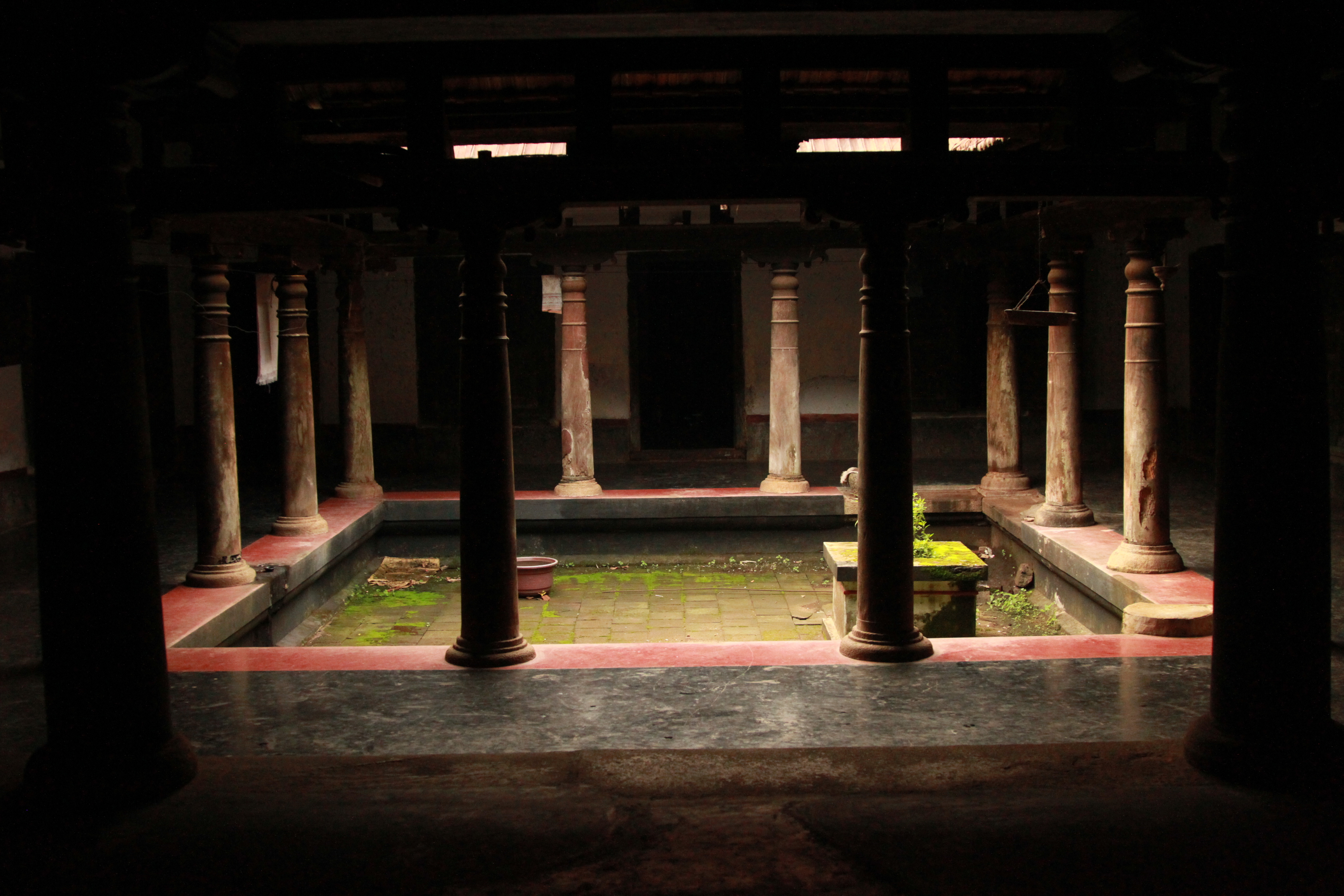
A traditional nadumuttam

Although Tharavadu houses come in different typologies, certain elements remain consistent in their layout. At the heart of the design is the nadumuttam, or central courtyard. The number of courtyards within a house traditionally spoke of the family’s wealth, status, and size.

Inseparable from the traditional concept of a tharavad is, historically, Kerala's distinctive Nālukettu architectural tradition. A classic Nalukettu tharavad would be built with four halls collectively enclosing a Nadumuttam, or open-air courtyard. Wealthier and more prominent tharavads would construct mansions with multiple such atria, such as the eight-halled Ettukettu, with two nadumuttams, or Pathinarukettu, sixteen-halled with four nadumuttams, and the preserve of royal families and tharavads of similar rank. Rarely, twelve-halled Pathrandukettu were constructed with three courtyards, and there is a record of a 32-halled Muppathirandukettu being erected, although it was lost to a fire soon after construction.

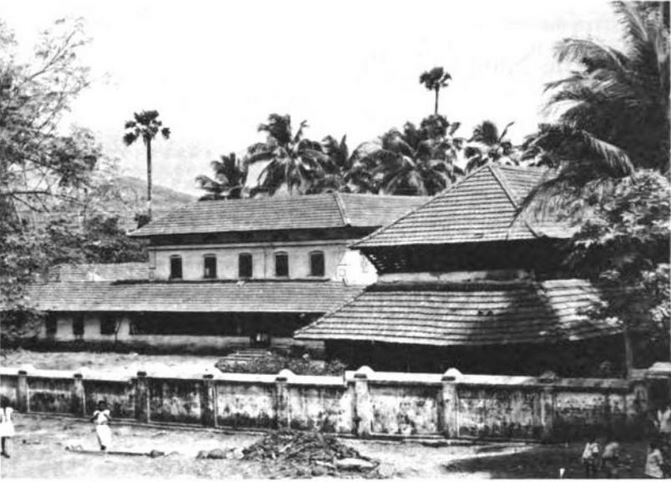
1901 photograph of a tharavadu
