= Little World Museum of Man =

Coordinates: 35°22′28″N 137°01′23″E

- リトルワールド
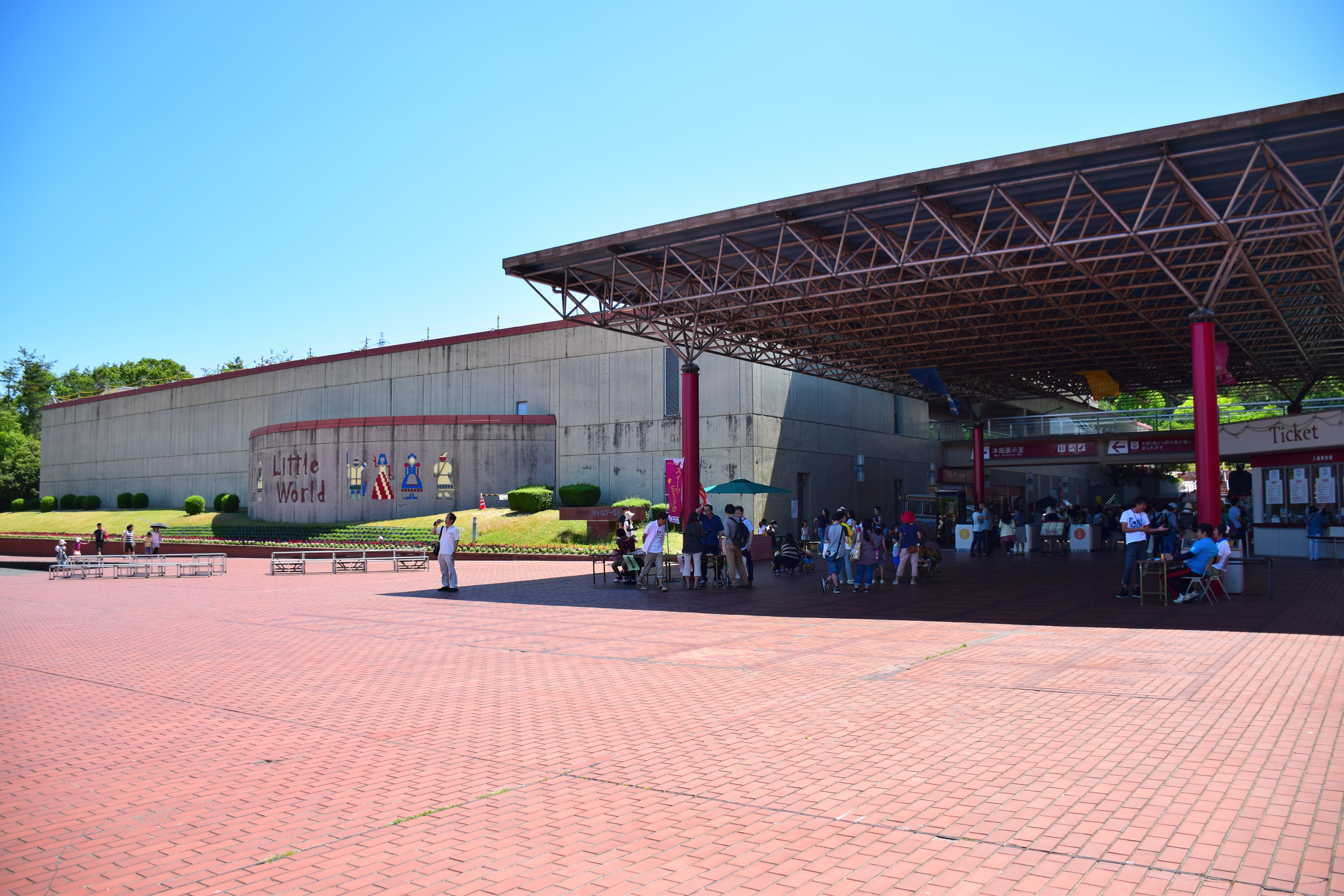
- Established: 1983
- Location: Inuyama, Aichi, Japan
- Type: Museum

The Little World Museum of Man (Japanese: リトルワールド, Hepburn: ritoruwārudo) is an open-air museum and amusement park near Inuyama, Aichi Prefecture, Japan.

== History ==
Little World was founded in 1983.

== Features ==
The park features buildings from more than 20 countries, either relocated from their native countries or built in the style of those countries. Countries represented include France, Germany, India, Indonesia, Italy, Micronesia, Peru, Tanzania, Thailand, Taiwan, Turkey, and the United States. Visitors can wear traditional ethnic costumes of France, Germany, Korea, and Okinawa. The site area is 1.23 million square meters, which is equivalent to the second largest site area in Japanese theme parks.

The museum holds regular events and concerts that showcase the countries exhibited.

== Gallery ==
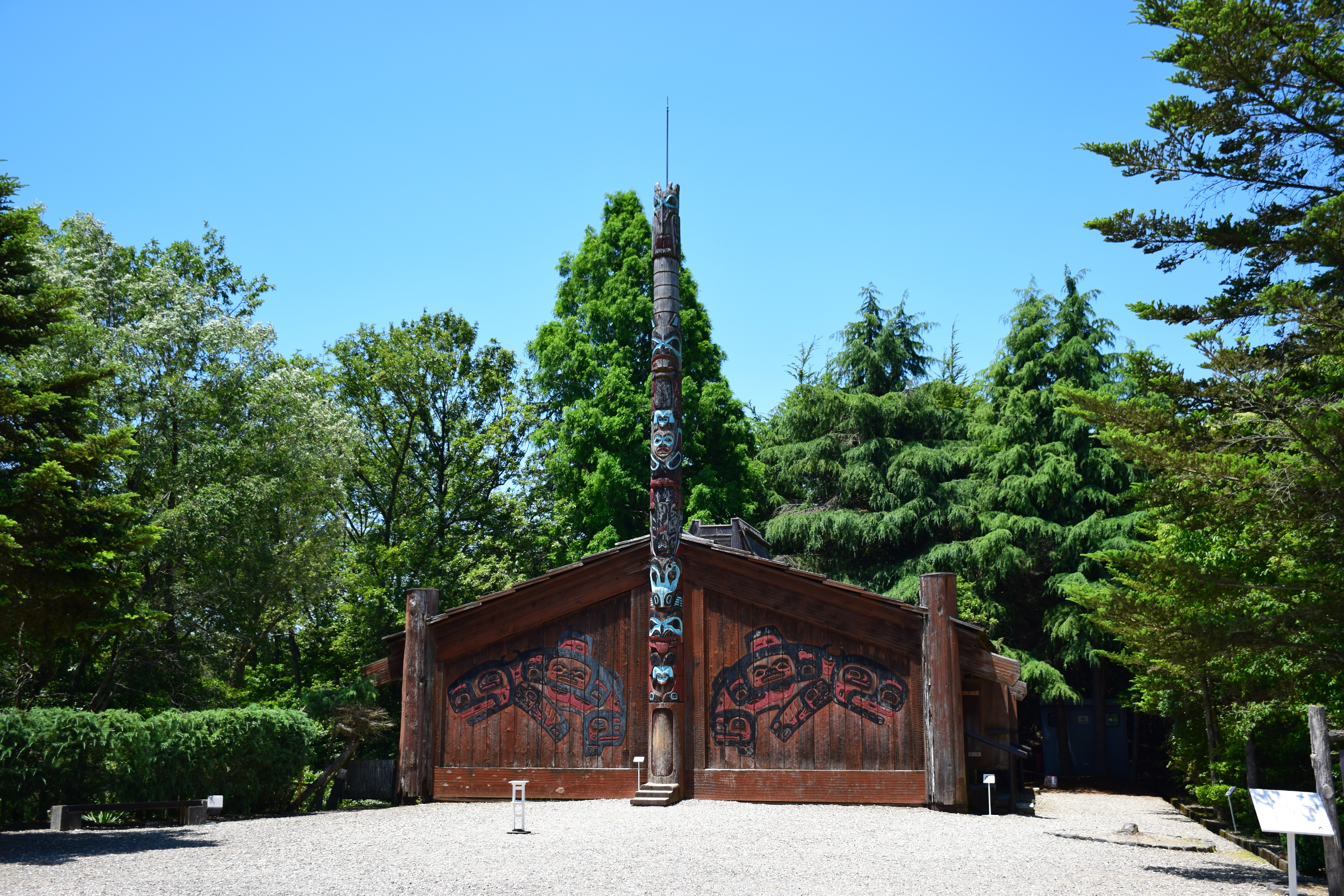
Tlingit House in Alaska

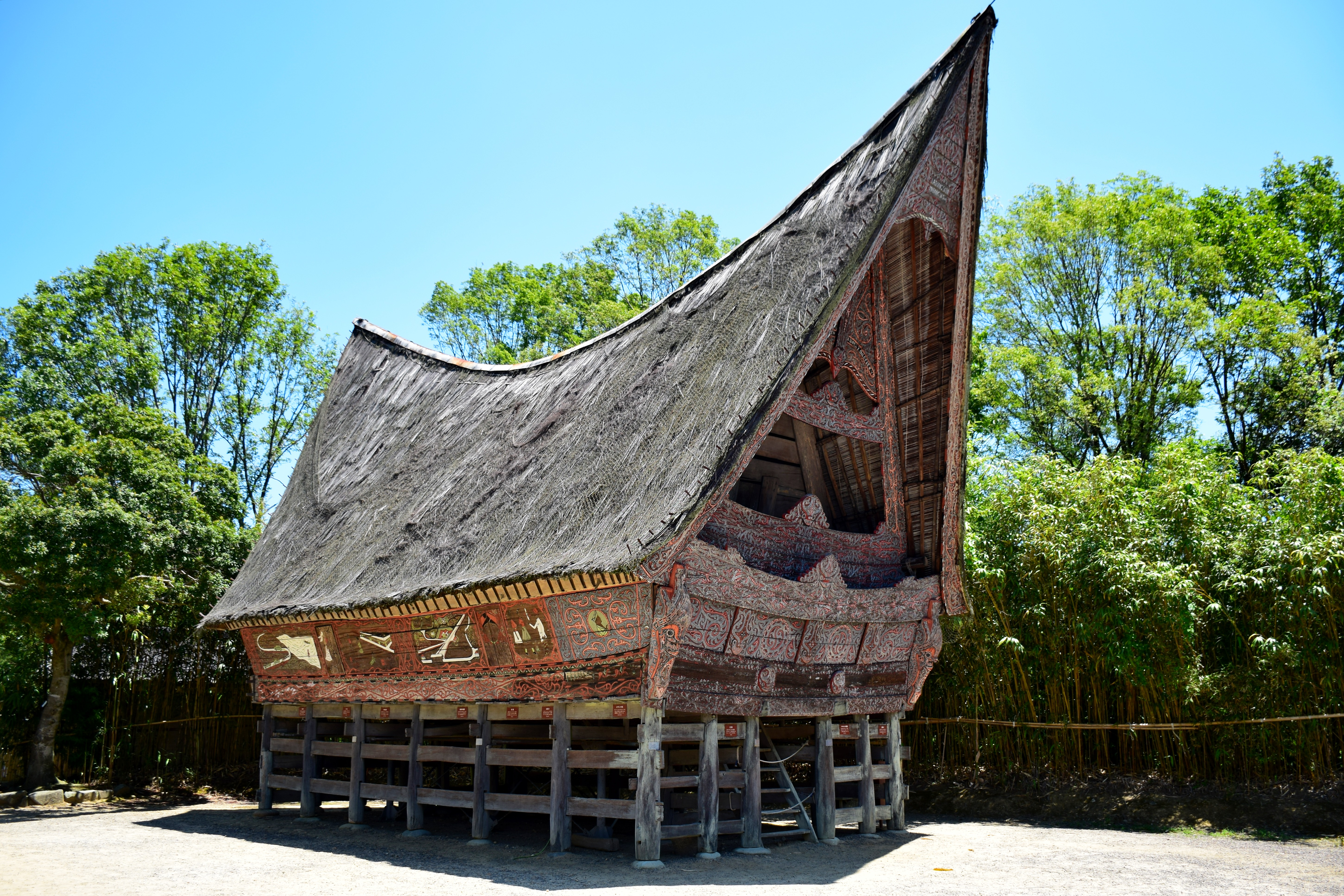
Toba-Batak House in Indonesia

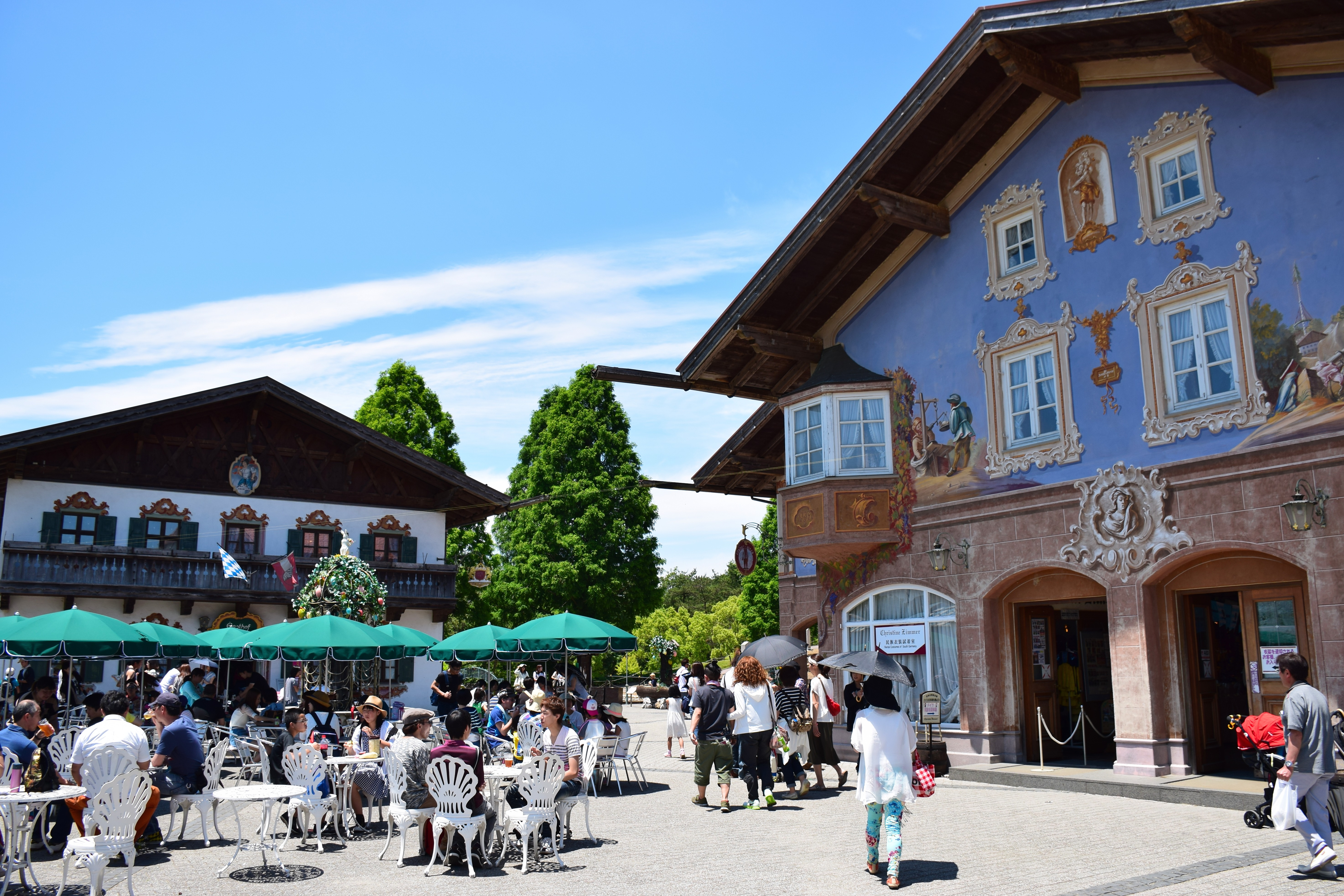
Bayern Village in Germany

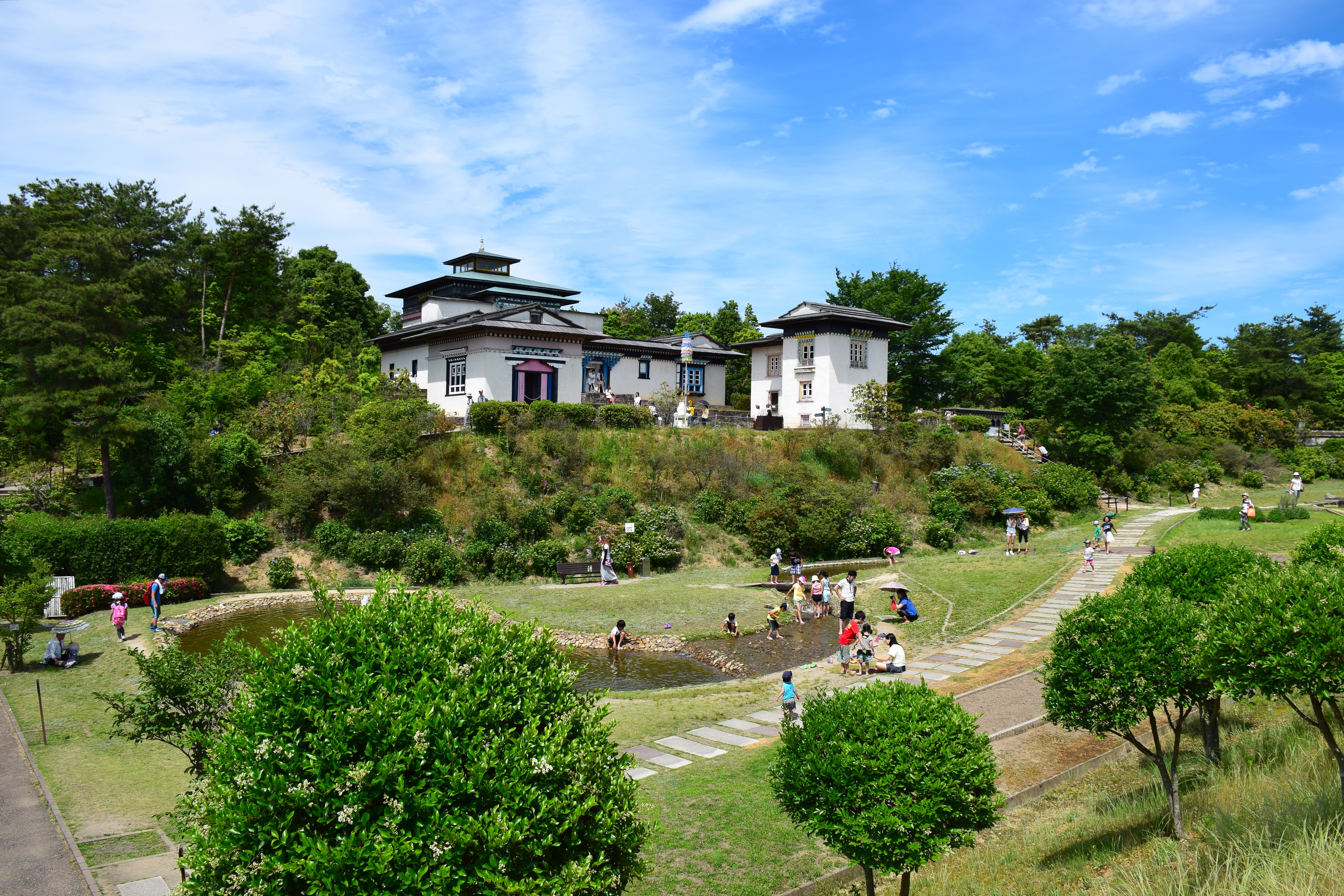
Buddhist Monastery in Nepal

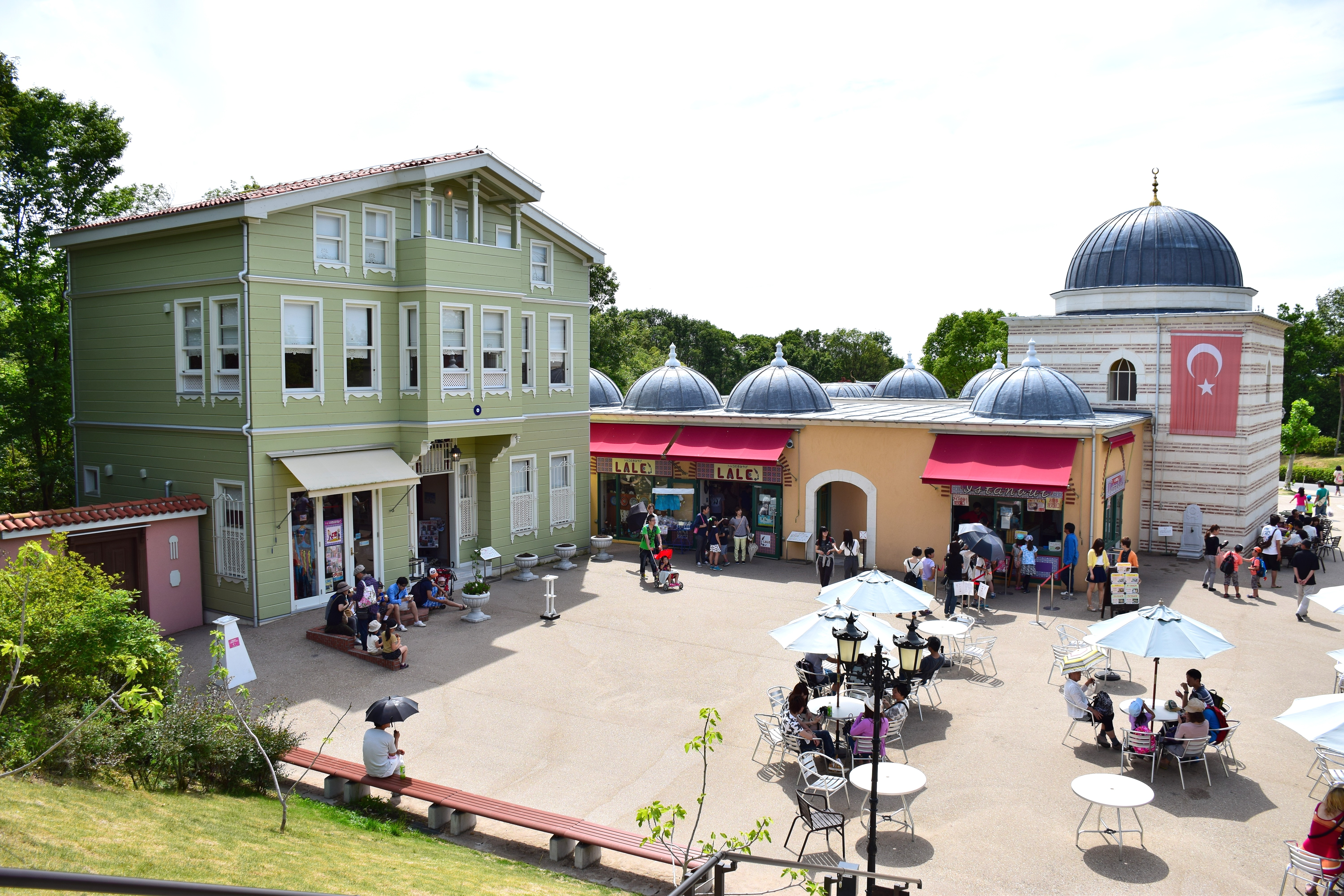
Istanbul Townscape in Turkey

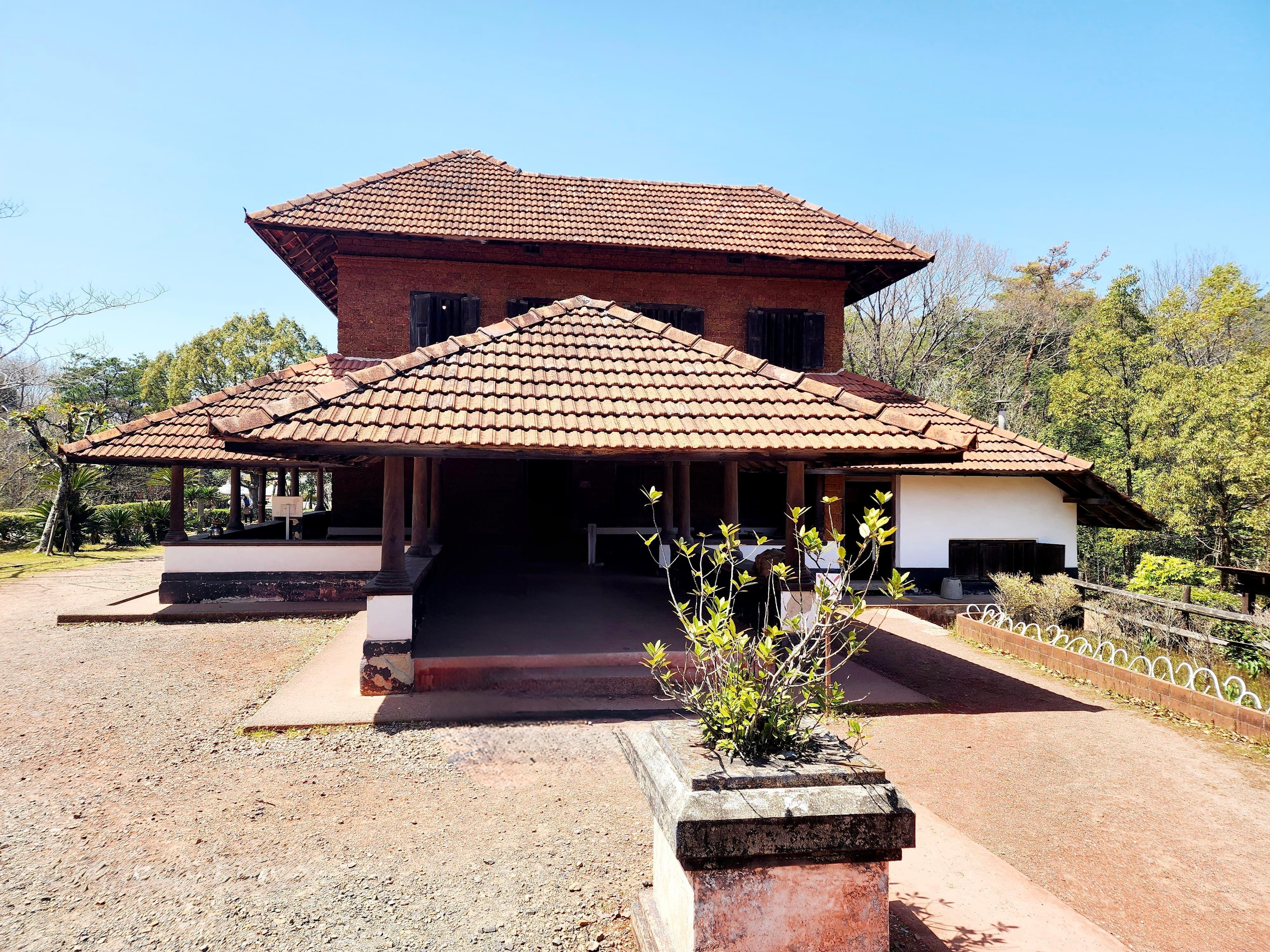
Tharavadu house in India

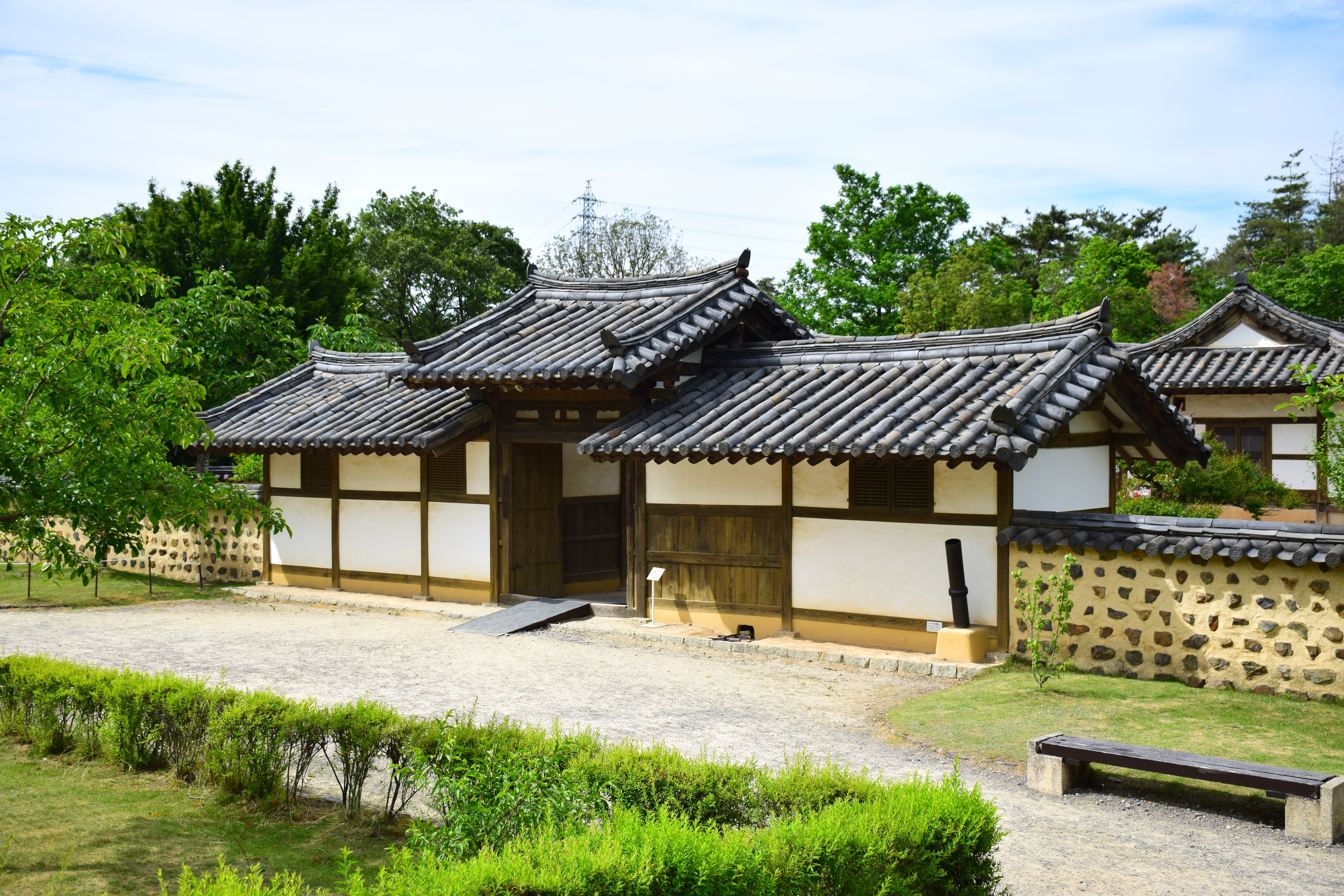
Landlord House in Korea

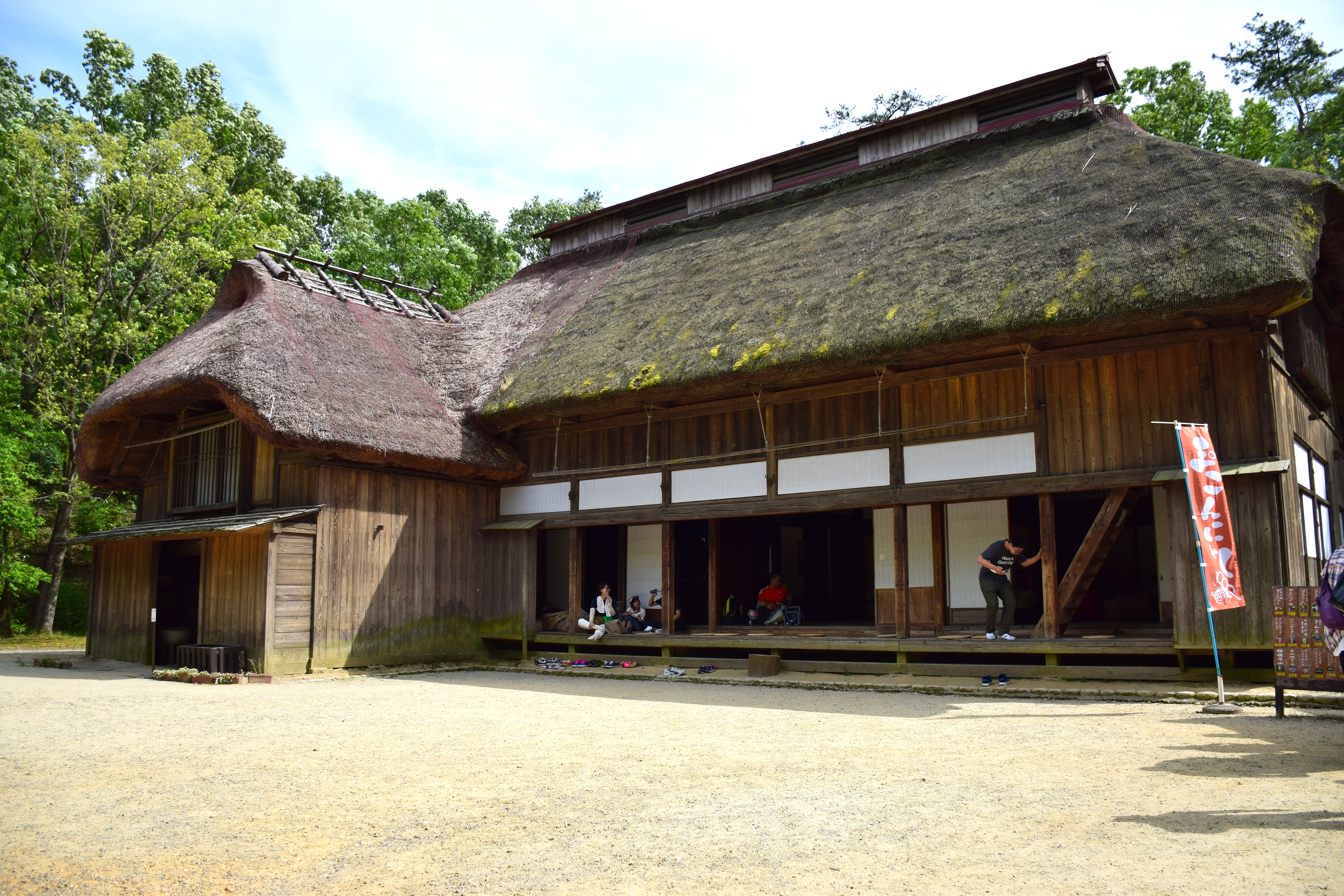
Farmhouse in Yamagata Prefecture, Japan

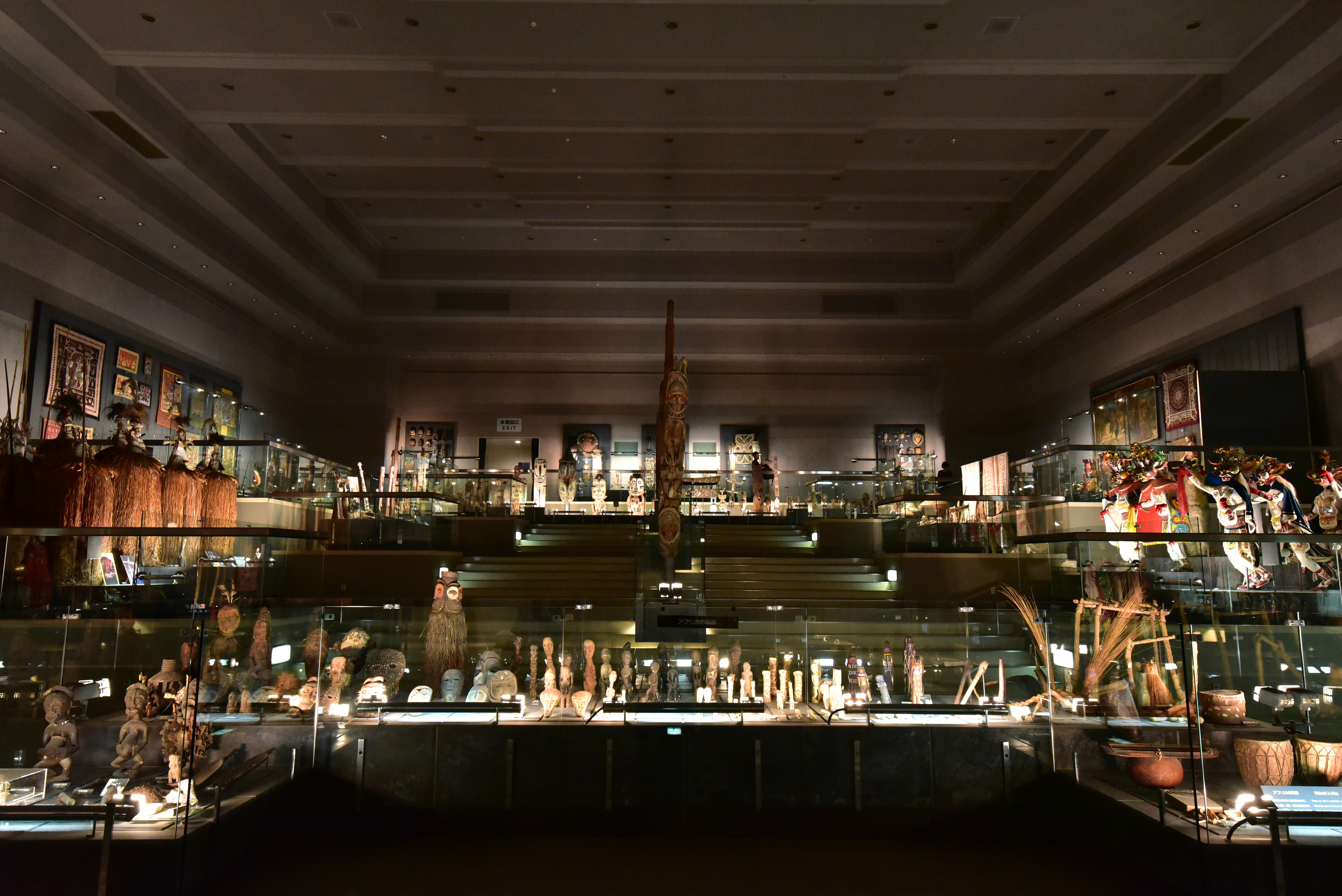
Main building exhibition room
