= Cherpulassery =

Cherpulassery Cherpulacherry
- Town
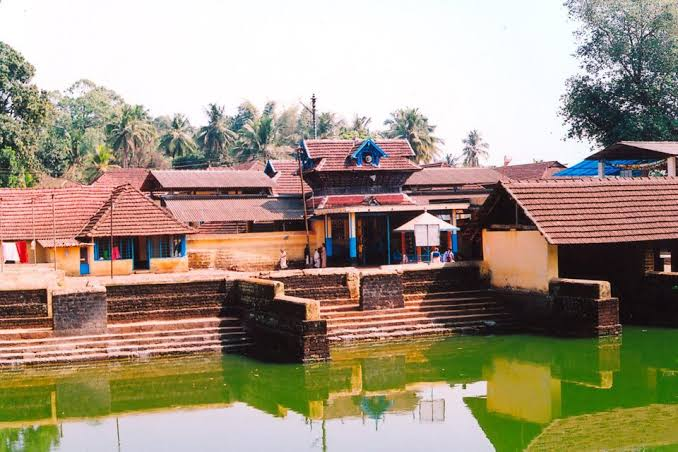
- Ayyappankavu, Cherpulassery

- Location in Kerala, India Cherpulassery (India)
- Coordinates: 10.879300°N 76.314750°E
- Country: India
- State: Kerala
- District: Palakkad

Government
  - Type: Municipal council
  - Body: Cherpulassery Municipality
  - Municipal Chairperson: Jamsiya KT (LDF)
  - Deputy chairperson: jayakrishnan c (LDF)

Area
  - Total: 32.68 km^{2} (12.62 sq mi)

Population (2011)
  - Total: 41,267
  - Density: 1,263/km^{2} (3,271/sq mi)

Languages
  - Official: Malayalam, English
- Time zone: UTC+5:30 (IST)
- PIN: 679503
- Telephone code: 0466
- Vehicle registration: KL-51

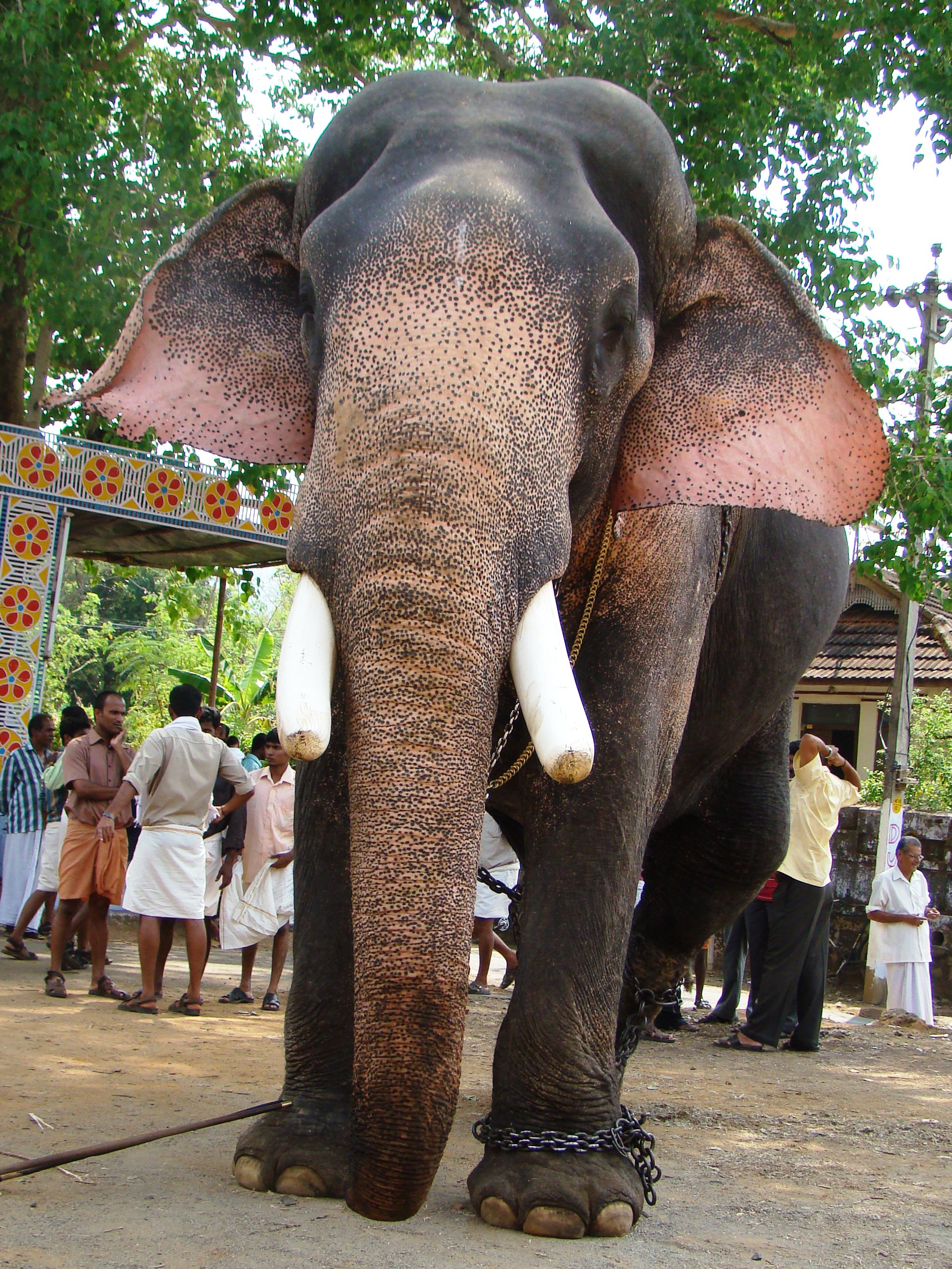
Cherpulassery Sekharan

Cherpulassery (also known by its former name Cherpulacherry) is a town and municipality in the Palakkad district, of Kerala, India. Cherpulassery is often called the Sabarimala of Malabar as the Ayyappankavu temple is located there. The Puthanalakkal Bhagavathi temple and the Kalavela and Pooram associated with it is one of the largest festivals in the region. The town is located about 43 km (27 mi) west of the district headquarters at Palakkad on State Highway 53 located in Cherpulassery.

== History ==
Cherpulassery (Cher- east side of pulasseri) was the seat of Nedungethirppad, the chief of Nedunganad, one of the principalities mentioned in the Chera inscriptions. The Nedunganad Swaroopam dynasty, held sway over the present-day Pattambi and Ottapalam Taluks till it was first conquered by Valluvanad in the early parts of 15th century, and immediately afterwards by the Zamorin of Calicut. The Zamorin appointed his local chieftain at Tharakkal Variyam to rule the area. Cherpulassery was made the headquarters of South Malabar during British Raj. The Nedunganad Taluk was merged into Walluvanad Taluk in 1860 as a part of the Malappuram revenue division of Malabar District, with its headquarters at Perinthalmanna, during British regime. It later became part of Ottapalam taluk, when Valluvanad Taluk was divided into Perinthalmanna and Ottapalam in 1957.

== Demographics ==
As of 2011 India census, Cherpulassery had a population of 41,267 with 19,808 males and 21,459 females.

== Transport ==
Cherpulassery is well connected by bus with the nearby towns of Ottapalam, Pattambi, Shornur and Perinthalmanna, all of which are at a distance of 17 km. There is also regular bus services to Mannarkkad and Palakkad.

The nearest major railway station is the Shoranur junction railway station. Other stations include Ottapalam and Pattambi; all of which are at equal distances from Cherpulassery.

== Politics ==
Cherpulassery comes under the Shornur assembly constituency and the Palakkad Loksabha constituency.

== Colleges ==
- Cherpulassery College of Science & Technology for Women
- Ideal Campus of Education
- Malabar Polytechnic College
- Kerala Medical College
- MES College, Cherpulassery
- K T N COLLEGE OF PHARMACY

== Schools ==
- GVHSS Cherpulassery
- South A L P School Cherpulassery
- KEMC School , Kuttikode, Cherpulassery
- Sabari Central School, Madathiparamp, Cherpulassery

== Notable people ==
- Appunni Tharakan : Kathakali Aniyara (behind the curtain) artist
- Kalamandalam Kuttan Asan
- Shamsudheen Cherpulassery, magician

== See also ==
- State Highway 53
- Palakkad district
