= Girish Puthenchery filmography =

This article outlines the filmography of renowned Malayalam lyricist Girish Puthenchery

Year	Film	Song	Composer
1989	Enquiry	Janmantharangalil	Rajamani
1990	Brahmarakshassu	Karukayum Thumbayum	Raveendran
1990	Brahmarakshassu	Mounathin chirakil	Raveendran
1991	Georgootty C/O Georgootty	Oru Ponkinaaviletho	Mohan Sithara
1991	Georgootty C/O Georgootty	Karalin	Mohan Sithara
1991	Georgootty C/O Georgootty	Eden Thottamithil	Mohan Sithara
1992	Thalasthaanam	Thamberin Thalam	Johnson
1992	Johnnie Walker	Chanchakkam Thenniyum	SP Venkitesh
1992	Johnnie Walker	Poomariyil	SP Venkitesh
1992	Johnnie Walker	Chemmanapoomancham	SP Venkitesh
1992	Johnnie Walker	Shanthamee Rathriyil	SP Venkitesh
1992	Johnnie Walker	Minnum Palunkukal	SP Venkitesh
1992	Thiruthalvaadi	Thankakkasavaniyum	SP Venkitesh
1992	Thiruthalvaadi	Manchadi Choppu	SP Venkitesh
1992	Thiruthalvaadi	Neelayamini Nin	SP Venkitesh
1992	Congratulations Miss Anitha Menon	Kalamozhi Kattunarum	KJ Joy
1992	Congratulations Miss Anitha Menon	Anthichukappittu	KJ Joy
1992	Oottyppattanam	Samagana layabhavam	Johnson
1992	Oottyppattanam	Kalanadam	Johnson
1992	Oottyppattanam	Ranjini Priyaranjani	Johnson
1992	Oottyppattanam	Vanolam	Johnson
1992	Neelakkurukkan	Swarnatheril	Johnson
1992	Neelakkurukkan	Aattam	Johnson
1992	Arthana	Kathiridum	SP Venkitesh
1992	Arthana	Kathoramam	SP Venkitesh
1992	Arthana	Thakilum	SP Venkitesh
1992	Arthana	Varnathodu Viral	SP Venkitesh
1992	Chakravalathinapuram	Ninkaral	Kozhikode Yesudas
1992	Chakravalathinapuram	Malarchoodu	Kozhikode Yesudas
1992	Chakravalathinapuram	Prakrithi	Kozhikode Yesudas
1992	Chakravalathinapuram	Jeevanilennum	Kozhikode Yesudas
1992	Chakravalathinapuram	Orusagaratheeram	Kozhikode Yesudas
1993	Ekalavyan	Rathrilillikal Poothapol	Rajamani
1993	Ekalavyan	Nandakishora Hare	Rajamani
1993	Ekalavyan	Shyama Mooka	Rajamani
1993	Kulapathi	Pon tharam	Mohan Sithara
1993	Kulapathi	Aaromaleyen	Mohan Sithara
1993	Kulapathi	Thennivarum poonthennale	Mohan Sithara
1993	Kulapathi	Mandaram manjil	Mohan Sithara
1993	Varam	Kunkumavum	Ouseppachan
1993	Varam	Hey Sarike	Ouseppachan
1993	Varam	Vennilavinte Varna	Ouseppachan
1993	Maayaamayooram	Aamballoor Ambalathil	Raghu Kumar
1993	Maayaamayooram	Kaikkudanna Niraye	Raghu Kumar
1993	Maayaamayooram	Neelambari	Raghu Kumar
1993	Porutham	Olakkam Peeli	Mohan Sithara
1993	Porutham	Vinnin veettil	Mohan Sithara
1993	Porutham	Vasantham Vaakamalar	Mohan Sithara
1993	Vakkeel Vasudev	Dev Sudev	Mohan Sithara
1993	Vakkeel Vasudev	Pavizhamanchalil	Mohan Sithara
1993	Journalist	Varade Subha Charithe	SP Venkitesh
1993	Journalist	Mutholathinkal	SP Venkitesh
1993	Pravaachakan	Palnilavil	SP Venkitesh
1993	Pravaachakan	Chanchaadi padaam	SP Venkitesh
1993	Melepparampil Aanveedu	Vellithinkal Poonkinnam	Johnson
1993	Melepparampil Aanveedu	Ooru sanam odi vannu	Johnson
1993	Harichandanam	Manjal kunkumam	SP Venkitesh
1993	Harichandanam	Kilu Kilungiyo	SP Venkitesh
1993	Harichandanam	Paadum Nam	SP Venkitesh
1993	Yaadavam	Anthikkattin Kayyil	Raghu Kumar
1993	Yaadavam	Pon thalam	Raghu Kumar
1993	Devaasuram	Vande Mukunda Hare	MG Radhakrishnan
1993	Devaasuram	Angopangam Swara	MG Radhakrishnan
1993	Devaasuram	Soorya kireedam	MG Radhakrishnan
1993	Devaasuram	Medapponnaniyum	MG Radhakrishnan
1993	Devaasuram	Gangaa Tharanga	MG Radhakrishnan
1993	Devaasuram	Yamunaa Kinaare	MG Radhakrishnan
1993	Devaasuram	Kizhakkannam Mamala	MG Radhakrishnan
1993	Devaasuram	Mappunalkoo Mahamane	MG Radhakrishnan
1993	Devaasuram	Maarimazhakal Nananche	MG Radhakrishnan
1993	Devaasuram	Sreepadam Ragardramay	MG Radhakrishnan
1994	Kinnarippuzhayoram	Nizhalkkoottile	MG Radhakrishnan
1994	Kinnarippuzhayoram	Muthola chillattam	MG Radhakrishnan
1994	Kinnarippuzhayoram	Konnappoo	MG Radhakrishnan
1994	Kinnarippuzhayoram	Olachangaali	MG Radhakrishnan
1994	Kinnarippuzhayoram	Ormakalil	MG Radhakrishnan
1994	Kinnarippuzhayoram	Thaarambaram	MG Radhakrishnan
1994	Sudinam	Ponnaathira	Rajamani
1994	Sudinam	Manjo Manjaadi	Rajamani
1994	Sudinam	Ragamidarunnu	Rajamani
1994	Thenmaavin Kombathu	Karutha penne Ninne	Berny Ignatius
1994	Thenmaavin Kombathu	Maanam thelinje Ninnal	Berny Ignatius
1994	Thenmaavin Kombathu	Kallipoonkuyile	Berny Ignatius
1994	Thenmaavin Kombathu	Nilapongalayelo	Berny Ignatius
1994	Thenmaavin Kombathu	Ente Manassiloru Nanam	Berny Ignatius
1994	The Porter	Kannil kunju kanavil	Vidyadharan Master
1994	The Porter	Paribhavamode	Vidyadharan Master
1994	The Porter	Pular Veyil	Vidyadharan Master
1994	The Porter	Kilukile	Vidyadharan Master
1994	Maanathe Kottaaram	Poonilaamazha	Berny Ignatius
1994	Maanathe Kottaaram	Kanneer kinaavinte	Berny Ignatius
1994	Maanathe Kottaaram	Manjuruki Pinne Kaanam	Berny Ignatius
1994	Maanathe Kottaaram	Parapampam Pamparam	Berny Ignatius
1994	Paalayam	Anthimana koodaram	Shyam
1994	Paalayam	Kulirala	Shyam
1994	Njaan Kodeeshwaran	Varavarna Melayay	Ouseppachan
1994	Njaan Kodeeshwaran	Medakkate Koodevaa	Ouseppachan
1994	Kaashmeeram	Novumidanenchil	MG Radhakrishnan
1994	Kaashmeeram	Masthikiye Rath	MG Radhakrishnan
1994	Kaashmeeram	Poru Nee Varilam	MG Radhakrishnan
1994	Vadhu Doctoraanu	Thankatheril	Kannur Rajan
1994	Vadhu Doctoraanu	Pularkala chandrika	Kannur Rajan
1995	Minnaram	Manjakunjikalulla	S.P Venkitesh
1995	Minnaram	Chinkaram kinnaram	S.P Venkitesh
1995	Minnaram	Oru vallam	S.P Venkitesh
1995	Minnaram	Nilave mayumo	S.P Venkitesh
1995	Minnaram	Kunjoonjal Aadam	S.P Venkitesh
1995	Minnaram	Darlings of mine	S.P Venkitesh
1995	Highway	Adipoli Adipoli	S.P Venkitesh
1995	Highway	Kikkili kili	S.P Venkitesh
1995	Highway	oru thari kasthoori	S.P Venkitesh
1995	Highway	Dolo dolakku	S.P Venkitesh
1995	Highway	Kunji kurumbin	S.P Venkitesh
1995	Radholsavam	Thechippove Thenkashi	Berny Ignatius
1995	Radholsavam	Nillamma	Berny Ignatius
1995	Radholsavam	Thappu thatti pattu kotti	Berny Ignatius
1995	Radholsavam	Kunjikurunne	Berny Ignatius
1995	Radholsavam	Mettukarathi Penne	Berny Ignatius
1995	Kattile thadi thevarude Aana	Holi Holi	Johnson
1995	Kattile thadi thevarude Aana	Devaragam sreelayamagum	Johnson
1995	Kokkarakko	Kannikinavinte	Kannur Rajan
1995	Kokkarakko	Pakalpakshi padum	Kannur Rajan
1995	Kokkarakko	Hey kirukka	Kannur Rajan
1995	Agnidevan Kerala State Film Award for Best Lyricist-1995	Suralala	MG Radhakrishnan
1995	Agnidevan Kerala State Film Award for Best Lyricist-1995	Samaganasarame	MG Radhakrishnan
1995	Agnidevan Kerala State Film Award for Best Lyricist-1995	Nilavinte neelabhasma	MG Radhakrishnan
1995	Simhavalan Menon	chakkinu vechathu	S.P Venkitesh
1995	Simhavalan Menon	Ee poonthennalum	S.P Venkitesh
1995	Simhavalan Menon	Singing	S.P Venkitesh
1995	Simhavalan Menon	pon kalabhamazha	S.P Venkitesh
1995	Aalancheri Thambrakkal	chinthamane	Perumbavoor G Ravindranath
1995	Aalancheri Thambrakkal	ponthirivilakoode	Perumbavoor G Ravindranath
1995	Aalancheri Thambrakkal	panan pattin	Perumbavoor G Ravindranath
1995	Arabikkadaloram	Hey Hawa	Sirpi
1995	Arabikkadaloram	Kaathoram Paadidaam	Sirpi
1995	Arabikkadaloram	Kadalorathirayaadiyo	Sirpi
1995	Arabikkadaloram	Konchum Kuyil Paattu Kettu	Sirpi
1995	Arabikkadaloram	Thankappoo Kinnathil	Sirpi
1995	Boxer	Pakal Maayunnu	Tomin Thachankari
1995	Mangalam Veettil Maanaseshwari Gupta	Yaamini	Johnson
1995	Mangalam Veettil Maanaseshwari Gupta	Kannippenne Penne	Johnson
1995	Avittam Thirunaal Aarogyasreemaan	Oorariyilla	SP Venkitesh
1995	Avittam Thirunaal Aarogyasreemaan	Thalappoli	SP Venkitesh
1995	Mimics Action 500	Manimala Mettil	SP Venkitesh
1995	Mimics Action 500	Mamalakkaranam	SP Venkitesh
1995	Mimics Action 500	Chellappoo Chamayappoo	SP Venkitesh
1995	Nirnayam	En mizhikkullil	Anand
1995	Nirnayam	Puliyanka Kolam	Anand
1995	Nirnayam	Malar Maasam	Anand
1995	Thacholi Vargheese Chekavar	Maaleyam	Sharreth
1995	Thacholi Vargheese Chekavar	Naadodithaalamkotti	Sharreth
1995	Thacholi Vargheese Chekavar	Suryanaalam	Sharreth
1995	Thacholi Vargheese Chekavar	Neeyonnupaadu	Sharreth
1995	Thacholi Vargheese Chekavar	Veeraalippattin	Sharreth
1995	Thacholi Vargheese Chekavar	Poothidampe	Sharreth
1995	Aksharam	Thankakkalabha	Perumbavoor G Ravindranath
1995	Aksharam	Navarasabhaavam	Perumbavoor G Ravindranath
1995	Chantha	Kodi Ketti	M Jayachandran
1995	Chantha	Yatheemin Sulthaan Vanne	M Jayachandran
1995	Hijack	Peelikkombil	Rajamani
1995	Hijack	Ravi raagam	Rajamani
1995	No. 1 Snehatheeram Banglore North	Mele Mele Maanam	Jerry Amaldev
1995	No. 1 Snehatheeram Banglore North	Ponnambili pottum	Jerry Amaldev
1995	No. 1 Snehatheeram Banglore North	Appom Chuttu	Jerry Amaldev
1995	No. 1 Snehatheeram Banglore North	Minnum Minna Minni	Jerry Amaldev
1995	No. 1 Snehatheeram Banglore North	Kokkurasumen	Jerry Amaldev
1995	No. 1 Snehatheeram Banglore North	Thilangum Thinkale	Jerry Amaldev
1995	Arabia	Hamma hai	Ouseppachan
1995	Arabia	Holi holi	Ouseppachan
1995	Arabia	Oh chandini	Ouseppachan
1995	Arabia	Chinaku chinaku	Ouseppachan
1995	Kusruthikkaattu	Hay Hay Hello	Tomin Thachankari
1995	Kusruthikkaattu	Ololam Veeshunna	Tomin Thachankari
1995	Kusruthikkaattu	Ilamaan Mizhiyil	Tomin Thachankari
1995	Kusruthikkaattu	Shubi Shubi	Tomin Thachankari
1995	Shipaayi Lahala	Mangala Deepam	SP Venkitesh
1995	Shipaayi Lahala	Oru Ponkinaavinte	SP Venkitesh
1995	Punnaaram	Japamaay Veda	Rajamani
1995	Punnaaram	Punnaaram Thannaaram	Rajamani
1995	The President	Nira deepamaay	Raveendran
1995	The President	Pottundu chaanthundu	Raveendran
1995	The President	My Dear Pappa	Raveendran
1995	Sundari Neeyum Sundaran Njaanum	Varoo Shyaama Hare	Jithin Shyam
1995	Sundari Neeyum Sundaran Njaanum	Kudukkinte Koottil	Jithin Shyam
1995	Minnaaminunginum Minnukettu	Manjil Pootha sandhye	SP Venkitesh
1995	Minnaaminunginum Minnukettu	Thankathamburuvo	SP Venkitesh
1995	Minnaaminunginum Minnukettu	Kunungi kunungi	SP Venkitesh
1995	Achan Kompathu Amma Varampathu	Anthi Paravakalengo	SP Venkitesh
1995	Achan Kompathu Amma Varampathu	Peelithirumudiyunde	SP Venkitesh
1995	Achan Kompathu Amma Varampathu	Ponnin muthe	SP Venkitesh
1995	Achan Kompathu Amma Varampathu	Raavirulin	SP Venkitesh
1995	Three Men Army	Swayam Marannonnu	Achu
1995	Three Men Army	Kalakaanchippaattin	Achu
1995	Mangalyasoothram	Oro Narumozhi	Berny Ignatius
1995	Mangalyasoothram	Vellaaram Kilikal	Berny Ignatius
1995	Mangalyasoothram	Akkuthikkuthaana	Berny Ignatius
1995	Mangalyasoothram	Etho Venalkkinaavin	Berny Ignatius
1995	Achan Raajaavu Appan Jethaavu	Kottaara Kettil	Rajamani
1995	Achan Raajaavu Appan Jethaavu	Kaanakkanneer	Rajamani
1995	Vridhanmaare Sookshikkuka	Anthimaanam	Berny Ignatius
1995	Vridhanmaare Sookshikkuka	Kombum Vilichu	Berny Ignatius
1995	Vridhanmaare Sookshikkuka	Vennilaa Thulliyaay	Berny Ignatius
1995	Mazhavilkkoodaaram	Manjil Maayum sayamkalam	S Balakrishnan
1996	Man of the Match	Ponnaavani poomuthe	Ilayaraja
1996	Man of the Match	Virahamaay	Ilayaraja
1996	Man of the Match	Kathirum kothi	Ilayaraja
1996	Ee Puzhayum Kadannu	Kaakkakkarumban	Johnson
1996	Ee Puzhayum Kadannu	Raathinkal Poothaali	Johnson
1996	Ee Puzhayum Kadannu	Vaidooryakkammal	Johnson
1996	Ee Puzhayum Kadannu	Thankachengila	Johnson
1996	Ee Puzhayum Kadannu	Sreelalolayam	Johnson
1996	Ee Puzhayum Kadannu	Paathiraappullunarnnu	Johnson
1996	Ee Puzhayum Kadannu	Devakanyaka	Johnson
1996	Malayala Maasam Chingam Onninu	Kunjikkuyil	Raveendran
1996	Malayala Maasam Chingam Onninu	Kaalam kalikaalam	Raveendran
1996	Malayala Maasam Chingam Onninu	Aaro Thankathidambo	Raveendran
1996	Malayala Maasam Chingam Onninu	Aakaasham	Raveendran
1996	Malayala Maasam Chingam Onninu	Vilolayaay	Raveendran
1996	Ishtamaanu Nooru Vattam	Manithinkal Deepam	S Balakrishnan
1996	Ishtamaanu Nooru Vattam	Kannoram Kaanaamuthe	S Balakrishnan
1996	Ishtamaanu Nooru Vattam	Aaraarennullinnullil	S Balakrishnan
1996	Ishtamaanu Nooru Vattam	Manjakkanikkonna	S Balakrishnan
1996	Ishtamaanu Nooru Vattam	Ponnum poovum	S Balakrishnan
1996	Ishtamaanu Nooru Vattam	Madhurikkum Manassinte	S Balakrishnan
1996	Ishtamaanu Nooru Vattam	Ambilimukulam	S Balakrishnan
1996	Kaalapaani	Maarikkoodinnullil	Ilayaraja
1996	Kaalapaani	Kottum Kuzhal Vili	Ilayaraja
1996	Kaalapaani	Chemboove Poove	Ilayaraja
1996	Kaalapaani	Aattirambile Kombile	Ilayaraja
1996	Indraprastham	Dekho simple magic	Vidyasagar
1996	Indraprastham	Parayumo mooka	Vidyasagar
1996	Indraprastham	Thankathinkal	Vidyasagar
1996	Laalanam	Snehalaalanam	SP Venkitesh
1996	Laalanam	Manjakkiliye	SP Venkitesh
1996	Laalanam	Manthravaadiyaay	SP Venkitesh
1996	Aakaashathekkoru Kilivaathil	Mizhikalilazhakin	Ouseppachan
1996	Aakaashathekkoru Kilivaathil	Paal nurayaay	Ouseppachan
1996	Aakaashathekkoru Kilivaathil	Ponnaambalpoo	Ouseppachan
1996	Hitlist	Vayanaadan Mettil	Jerry Amaldev
1996	Hitlist	Aadimadhyaanthangal	Jerry Amaldev
1996	Hitlist	Enthee Naanam Chollaamo	Jerry Amaldev
1996	Hitlist	Manjakkilikale Kunjikkilikale	Jerry Amaldev
1996	The Prince	Cholakkilikal	Deva
1996	The Prince	Jim thaka jim thaka	Deva
1996	The Prince	Kannil kannil	Deva
1996	The Prince	Nanda Nandana	Deva
1996	The Prince	Shyaamayaam Raadhike	Deva
1996	The Prince	Thanana Thanana	Deva
1996	Kaathil Oru Kinnaaram	Mele Vinnile	SP Venkitesh
1996	Kaathil Oru Kinnaaram	Thakiladi Thaalavumaay	SP Venkitesh
1996	Vaanarasena	Ponnum Kinaave	Berny Ignatius
1996	Vaanarasena	Thom Thithom	Berny Ignatius
1996	Naalaamkettile Nalla Thambimaar	Madhu Mazhai Paitha	SP Venkitesh
1996	Naalaamkettile Nalla Thambimaar	Kunjikaattin Kannitheril	SP Venkitesh
1996	Naalaamkettile Nalla Thambimaar	Hayya Hayya Meyyurukunnu	SP Venkitesh
1996	Naalaamkettile Nalla Thambimaar	Chendumalli Chempaka	SP Venkitesh
1996	Hitler	Neeyurangiyo nilave	SP Venkitesh
1996	Hitler	Vaarthinkale	SP Venkitesh
1996	Hitler	Kithachethum kaatte	SP Venkitesh
1996	Hitler	Maarivil Poonkuyile	SP Venkitesh
1996	Hitler	Sundarimaare Ketti	SP Venkitesh
1996	Hitler	Vaarthinkale	SP Venkitesh
1996	Padanaayakan	Karimukilkkaadilakki	Rajamani
1996	Aramanaveedum Anjoorekkarum	Ponnaambale	BA Chidambaranath
1996	Aramanaveedum Anjoorekkarum	Namma Oorukku	BA Chidambaranath
1996	Aramanaveedum Anjoorekkarum	Ayyanaar Kovil	BA Chidambaranath
1996	Swarnna Kireedam	Eeran nilaavo	SP Venkitesh
1996	King Soloman	Thudi Thudi	Deva
1996	King Soloman	Mounam	Deva
1996	King Soloman	Malar Manchalil	Deva
1996	King Soloman	Jick Jilu	Deva
1996	Kaanaakkinaavu	Nilaakkaayalolam	Raghu Kumar
1996	Kaanaakkinaavu	Ezhaam Beharinte	Raghu Kumar
1996	Kaanaakkinaavu	Ullil Kurukkunna	Raghu Kumar
1996	Kaanaakkinaavu	Nilaakaayalolam	Raghu Kumar
1996	Kaanaakkinaavu	Madhumaasa Chandran	Raghu Kumar
1996	Kaanaakkinaavu	Jaalakathin Pinnil	Raghu Kumar
1996	Kaanaakkinaavu	Nenjil Nira Mizhineerumaay	Raghu Kumar
1996	Kaanaakkinaavu	Omale Nin Kannil	Raghu Kumar
1996	Kaanaakkinaavu	Varshameghame	Raghu Kumar
1996	Kaliveedu	Seemanthayaaminiyil	Mohan Sithara
1996	Kinnam Katta Kallan	Kukkoo Kuukum	Kabooli Orissa
1996	Kinnam Katta Kallan	Mizhideepa Naalam	Kabooli Orissa
1996	Kinnam Katta Kallan	Mukilthudi Kotti	Kabooli Orissa
1996	Kinnam Katta Kallan	Theeppori Pambarangal	Kabooli Orissa
1996	Rajaputhran	Hello Hello Mr Romeo	M Jayachandran
1996	Rajaputhran	Mizhippookkalenthe	M Jayachandran
1996	Rajaputhran	Niravaavo Narupoovo	M Jayachandran
1996	Excuse Me Ethu Collegila	Paarvanachandrika	Mohan Sithara
1996	Excuse Me Ethu Collegila	Break Dance	Mohan Sithara
1996	Excuse Me Ethu Collegila	Shankraa Shankaraa	Mohan Sithara
1996	Excuse Me Ethu Collegila	Street Dance	Mohan Sithara
1996	Nandagopalante Kusruthikal	Madhumaya Swara	Rajamani
1996	Nandagopalante Kusruthikal	Oru Manjupoovin	Rajamani
1996	Maanchiyam	Mounam Moolippaadum	Tomin Thachankari
1996	Maanchiyam	Mannil Vinnil	Tomin Thachankari
1996	Maanchiyam	Ennethedi	Tomin Thachankari
1997	Nagarapuraanam	Dooreyo Shaanthamaam	SP Venkitesh
1997	Lelam	Urukiyuruki	Ouseppachan
1997	Lelam	Kunkumamo	Ouseppachan
1997	Lelam	Kurumaali Kunninu	Ouseppachan
1997	Fashion Parade	Peelikkammalaninjavale	Wilson
1997	Fashion Parade	Paalthennale	Wilson
1997	Fashion Parade	Hai Hai Hai Nagaram	Wilson
1997	Fashion Parade	Innum Ambili	Wilson
1997	Fashion Parade	Thelivilakku Kunthurakkumee	Wilson
1997	Fashion Parade	Thoovennilaavo	Wilson
1997	Krishnagudiyil Oru Pranayakaalathu Kerala state Film award for Best Lyricist -1997	Saandramaam Sandhyathan	Vidyasagar
1997	Krishnagudiyil Oru Pranayakaalathu Kerala state Film award for Best Lyricist -1997	Suvi Suvi	Vidyasagar
1997	Krishnagudiyil Oru Pranayakaalathu Kerala state Film award for Best Lyricist -1997	Pinneyum Pinenyum	Vidyasagar
1997	Krishnagudiyil Oru Pranayakaalathu Kerala state Film award for Best Lyricist -1997	Kaathirippoo	Vidyasagar
1997	Krishnagudiyil Oru Pranayakaalathu Kerala state Film award for Best Lyricist -1997	Vinnile	Vidyasagar
1997	Krishnagudiyil Oru Pranayakaalathu Kerala state Film award for Best Lyricist -1997	Manjumaasappakshi	Vidyasagar
1997	Poothumpiyum Poovalanmaarum	Raakkoodu thatti	Rajamani
1997	Poothumpiyum Poovalanmaarum	Eri kanalaay	Rajamani
1997	Poothumpiyum Poovalanmaarum	Kunkumam charthumee	Rajamani
1997	Kilukil Pamparam	Manithinkal Thidambinmel	SP Venkitesh
1997	Kilukil Pamparam	Vara chandralekhayalle	SP Venkitesh
1997	Kilukil Pamparam	Murahara Murali Govinda	SP Venkitesh
1997	Kilukil Pamparam	Thalavaraykkoru	SP Venkitesh
1997	Mangalyappallakku	Vennilaa	Balabhaskar
1997	Mangalyappallakku	Varavaay	Balabhaskar
1997	Mangalyappallakku	Pularvana Panthalorukki	Balabhaskar
1997	Mangalyappallakku	Vishuppakshi	Balabhaskar
1997	Mangalyappallakku	Priya Tharake	Balabhaskar
1997	Mangalyappallakku	Nirathingale	Balabhaskar
1997	Moonnu Kodiyum 300 Pavanum	Chandanamulla chandrika	SP Venkitesh
1997	Moonnu Kodiyum 300 Pavanum	Dheem Thitha Tharikida	SP Venkitesh
1997	Bhaaratheeyam	Swathanthra Bhaaratha	Berny Ignatius
1997	Bhaaratheeyam	Makayiram	Berny Ignatius
1997	Bhaaratheeyam	Kukku Kukku	Berny Ignatius
1997	Bhaaratheeyam	Saayaahna Meghathin	Berny Ignatius
1997	Kalyaanakkacheri	Pakal maayunnu	SP Venkitesh
1997	Kalyaanakkacheri	Ponkinaavalle	SP Venkitesh
1997	Kalyaanakkacheri	Mangala Melangal	SP Venkitesh
1997	Poonilaamazha	Illa Illa Marakilla	Laxmikant Pyarelal
1997	Poonilaamazha	Aattuthottilil Ninne	Laxmikant Pyarelal
1997	Poonilaamazha	Thaarakam Deepakam	Laxmikant Pyarelal
1997	Poonilaamazha	Thaka thaanka thakidathom	Laxmikant Pyarelal
1997	Poonilaamazha	Mizhineerkkadalo	Laxmikant Pyarelal
1997	Poonilaamazha	Chilu Chilu Chilachum	Laxmikant Pyarelal
1997	Raajathanthram	Kilunnu Pennin	Berny Ignatius
1997	Raajathanthram	Kanneerppaadam	Berny Ignatius
1997	Raajathanthram	Chandanavarna	Berny Ignatius
1997	Newspaper Boy	Venalkkoodinullil	Wilson
1997	Newspaper Boy	Oru Venpiraavu	Wilson
1997	Newspaper Boy	Punnaram thudi	Wilson
1997	Newspaper Boy	Venal	Wilson
1997	Newspaper Boy	Kunju kunju	Wilson
1997	Adivaaram	Kulir Peytha Maamazhayil	Johnson
1997	Oru Yaathraamozhi	Pon Veyilile ...	Ilayaraja
1997	Oru Yaathraamozhi	Kaakkaala Kannama	Ilayaraja
1997	Oru Yaathraamozhi	Manjolum Raathri	Ilayaraja
1997	Oru Yaathraamozhi	Thaimaavin Thanalil	Ilayaraja
1997	Oru Yaathraamozhi	Erikanal Kaattil	Ilayaraja
1997	Ancharakkalyaanam	Kalakalam Kaayalil	Wilson
1997	Ancharakkalyaanam	Kalikaala Kootinullil	Wilson
1997	Ancharakkalyaanam	Maanikya Veena	Wilson
1997	Ancharakkalyaanam	Kalyaanam Ancharakalyanam	Wilson
1997	Gangothri	Dhinna dhinna	SP Venkitesh
1997	Gangothri	Chaandni Chaandni	SP Venkitesh
1997	Gangothri	Manjumalar Kunkumam	SP Venkitesh
1997	Gangothri	Kunjikuyil paattil	SP Venkitesh
1997	Gangothri	Manjumalar Kunkumam	SP Venkitesh
1997	Varnappakittu	Aakaashangalil	Vidyasagar
1997	Varnappakittu	Velli Nilaa	Vidyasagar
1997	Varnappakittu	Manikyakkallaal	Vidyasagar
1997	Varnappakittu	Doore Maamara Kombil	Vidyasagar
1997	Varnappakittu	Okkella Okkella	Vidyasagar
1997	Chandralekha	Sa Pa Ma Pa	Berny Ignatius
1997	Chandralekha	Thaamarappoovil Vaazhum	Berny Ignatius
1997	Chandralekha	Appukutta Thoppikatra	Berny Ignatius
1997	Chandralekha	Innale mayangunna	Berny Ignatius
1997	Chandralekha	Ammoommakkili Vaayaadi	Berny Ignatius
1997	Chandralekha	Maanathe Chandiranothoru	Berny Ignatius
1997	The Good Boys	Pakal Maayum Mukil Maanam	Bappi Lahiri
1997	The Good Boys	Aathire Neeyallatharundenne	Bappi Lahiri
1997	The Good Boys	Maarivillo Malarnilaavo	Bappi Lahiri
1997	The Good Boys	Ven Praave	Bappi Lahiri
1997	Guru Shishyan	Thira Nunanja Saagaram	Johnson
1997	Guru Shishyan	Kochu Veluppinu	Johnson
1997	Guru Shishyan	Kashmeeri Penne Vaa	Johnson
1997	Guru Shishyan	Anthimukilpraavin	Johnson
1997	Gajaraajamanthram	Indukale	Berny Ignatius
1997	Gajaraajamanthram	Manjil mungum maamarathil	Berny Ignatius
1997	Gajaraajamanthram	Melekkaavil	Berny Ignatius
1997	Aattuvela	Kaana kaattil	Raveendran
1997	Aattuvela	Orukaliparayatte	Raveendran
1997	Aattuvela	Kurumaatti Koottum	Raveendran
1997	Aattuvela	Anjanakkannezhuthi	Raveendran
1997	Aattuvela	Kaattumaakkaan Kesuvinu	Raveendran
1997	Aattuvela	Pulari Nila Paravakalaay	Raveendran
1997	Aattuvela	Yaathrayaay Sooryanum	Raveendran
1997	Nee Varuvolam	Ee Thennalum	Johnson
1997	Nee Varuvolam	Thaane poliyum	Johnson
1997	Nee Varuvolam	Poonilaavo	Johnson
1997	Nee Varuvolam	Thaane Poliyum	Johnson
1997	Nee Varuvolam	Thaane Poliyum Kaithiri	Johnson
1997	Snehasindooram	Peelichundil	Johnson
1997	Snehasindooram	Shubharaagam Shruthilolam	Johnson
1997	Snehasindooram	Maarikkiliye	Johnson
1997	Snehasindooram	Mounamaay	Johnson
1997	Aaraam Thampuraan	Kadalaadum	Raveendran
1997	Aaraam Thampuraan	Harimuraleeravam	Raveendran
1997	Aaraam Thampuraan	Kuyil paadum	Raveendran
1997	Aaraam Thampuraan	Paadi Thodiyiletho	Raveendran
1997	Aaraam Thampuraan	Santhatham Sumasharan	Raveendran
1997	Bhoopathi	Kunkuma Malarithale	SP Venkitesh
1997	Bhoopathi	Ponkanimalaro Kanavo	SP Venkitesh
1997	Bhoopathi	Kathiroli Kunjuthinkal	SP Venkitesh
1997	Ikkareyaanente Maanasam	Ilamaavin	SP Venkitesh
1997	Ikkareyaanente Maanasam	Pallimukkile	SP Venkitesh
1997	Ikkareyaanente Maanasam	Kannilkkannil	SP Venkitesh
1997	Manichilanka	Maayumo Maranthathaarame	Wilson
1997	Manichilanka	Kaanaathingal pottum	Wilson
1997	Manichilanka	Panineerppoykakal	Wilson
1997	Manichilanka	Veyilchayum	Wilson
1997	Shaanthipuram Thampuraan	Peelikkannil	Berny Ignatius
1997	Shaanthipuram Thampuraan	Thankatherirangi	Berny Ignatius
1997	Shaanthipuram Thampuraan	Oh! my love	Berny Ignatius
1997	Shaanthipuram Thampuraan	Hambul bulai	Berny Ignatius
1997	Shaanthipuram Thampuraan	Vaasantha chandralekhe	Berny Ignatius
1997	Oru Panchathanthram Kadha	Chellam Chellam	Rajamani
1997	Oru Panchathanthram Kadha	Kalakalam Paadum Kili	Rajamani
1997	Oru Panchathanthram Kadha	Kallu Kudikkaan Moham	Rajamani
1997	Oru Panchathanthram Kadha	Priyamaay	Rajamani
1997	Oru Panchathanthram Kadha	Thaliridum Poonchirakumaay	Rajamani
1997	Bhaavaartham	Doorathaara Deepame	SP Venkitesh
1997	Bhaavaartham	Paalchundil	SP Venkitesh
1997	Bhaavaartham	Minnaaram Kurunne	SP Venkitesh
1997	Bhaavaartham	Ambili Machalilo	SP Venkitesh
1997	Swantham Makalkku Snehapoorvam	Swara Chandrike	SP Venkitesh
1997	Swantham Makalkku Snehapoorvam	Manju Malare	SP Venkitesh
1997	Swantham Makalkku Snehapoorvam	Etho Paathayil	SP Venkitesh
1997	Swantham Makalkku Snehapoorvam	Thudikotti Chaanchaattam	SP Venkitesh
1997	Shobhanam	Ammini Ponnammini	SP Venkitesh
1997	Shobhanam	Raathrilillyppoovin	SP Venkitesh
1997	Shobhanam	Maarile Mankudilil	SP Venkitesh
1997	Shobhanam	Thinkal Therirangi	SP Venkitesh
1998	Kaikkudanna Nilaavu	Vaalittu kannezhuthum	Kaithapram
1998	Kaikkudanna Nilaavu	Kaaveri theerathe	Kaithapram
1998	Kaikkudanna Nilaavu	Malayannaarkkannan	Kaithapram
1998	Kaikkudanna Nilaavu	Mangala deepavumaay	Kaithapram
1998	Kaikkudanna Nilaavu	Iniyum paribhavam	Kaithapram
1998	Kaikkudanna Nilaavu	Kaaveri theerathe	Kaithapram
1998	Draavidan	Shoshannappoove Nin	SP Venkitesh
1998	Draavidan	Ampada padavili	SP Venkitesh
1998	Panchaloham	Enthe mulle	Raveendran
1998	Panchaloham	Dhanumaasa	Raveendran
1998	Panchaloham	Pulari than hrudayam	Raveendran
1998	Panchaloham	Enthe Mulle	Raveendran
1998	Manjukaalavum Kazhinju	Swarna Dala Kodikal	Johnson
1998	Manjukaalavum Kazhinju	Atham Pathinu Muttathethum	Johnson
1998	Manjukaalavum Kazhinju	Poovaamkurunnila	Johnson
1998	Chenapparampile Aanakkaaryam	Panineerppoykakal Mizhikal	Wilson
1998	Chenapparampile Aanakkaaryam	Kaanaathinkal Pottum	Wilson
1998	Chenapparampile Aanakkaaryam	Veyil Kaayum Kunnin	Wilson
1998	Chenapparampile Aanakkaaryam	Theri Pyaari Pyaari	Wilson
1998	Summer in Bethlehem	Choolamadichu	Vidyasagar
1998	Summer in Bethlehem	Confusion Theerkkaname	Vidyasagar
1998	Summer in Bethlehem	Maarivillin Gopurangal	Vidyasagar
1998	Summer in Bethlehem	Ethrayo Janmamaay	Vidyasagar
1998	Summer in Bethlehem	Kunnimanikkoottil	Vidyasagar
1998	Summer in Bethlehem	Oru Raathri Koodi	Vidyasagar
1998	Summer in Bethlehem	Poonchillamel	Vidyasagar
1998	British Market	Adavellaam Payatti	Rajamani
1998	British Market	Kuchipudi Kuchipadi	Rajamani
1998	Chinthaavishtayaaya Shyaamala	Machakathammaye	Johnson
1998	Chinthaavishtayaaya Shyaamala	Aarodum Mindaathe	Johnson
1998	Meenathil Thaalikettu	Kaanaakkoottin	Ouseppachan
1998	Meenathil Thaalikettu	Oru poovine	Ouseppachan
1998	Meenathil Thaalikettu	Maarivillin	Ouseppachan
1998	Meenathil Thaalikettu	Aaromale	Ouseppachan
1998	Meenathil Thaalikettu	Dooreyoru thaaram	Ouseppachan
1998	Meenathil Thaalikettu	Thalam Thakiladi	Ouseppachan
1998	Kanmadam	Moovanthithaazhvarayil	Raveendran
1998	Kanmadam	Manjakkiliyude	Raveendran
1998	Kanmadam	Thiruvaathira	Raveendran
1998	Kanmadam	Doore karalilurukumoru	Raveendran
1998	Kanmadam	Manjakkiliyude	Raveendran
1998	Kanmadam	Kaathoram Kannaaram	Raveendran
1998	Nakshathrathaaraattu	Ponveyil	Mohan Sithara
1998	Nakshathrathaaraattu	Chellakkaattu	Mohan Sithara
1998	Nakshathrathaaraattu	Neeyente Paattil	Mohan Sithara
1998	Nakshathrathaaraattu	Poomaanam Pooppanthal	Mohan Sithara
1998	Nakshathrathaaraattu	Chellakkaattu chaanchaam	Mohan Sithara
1998	Rakthasaakshikal Sindaabaad	Ponnaaryan Paadam	MG Radhakrishnan
1998	Rakthasaakshikal Sindaabaad	Cheruvallikkaavilinnu	MG Radhakrishnan
1998	Rakthasaakshikal Sindaabaad	Vaikaashi Thennalo	MG Radhakrishnan
1998	Rakthasaakshikal Sindaabaad	Panineer Maariyil	MG Radhakrishnan
1998	Kusrithikkuruppu	Melleyen kannile	Johnson
1998	Kusrithikkuruppu	Thaarmakalkkanpulla Thathe	Johnson
1998	Kusrithikkuruppu	Maanathe maamayile	Johnson
1998	Kusrithikkuruppu	Peelimukil Thaazhvarayil	Johnson
1998	Oru Maravathoor Kanavu	Karunaamayane	Vidyasagar
1998	Oru Maravathoor Kanavu	Mohamaay	Vidyasagar
1998	Oru Maravathoor Kanavu	Thinkalkkuri	Vidyasagar
1998	Oru Maravathoor Kanavu	Sundariye Sundariye	Vidyasagar
1998	Oru Maravathoor Kanavu	Thaarakkoottam	Vidyasagar
1998	Oru Maravathoor Kanavu	Kanninila	Vidyasagar
1998	Aaghosham	Ponnurukkum	Samji Aaraattupuzha
1998	Aaghosham	Thoovenpraavukal	Samji Aaraattupuzha
1998	Aaghosham	Aalameene Udayone	Samji Aaraattupuzha
1998	Pranayavarnangal	Kannaadikkoodum Kootti	Vidyasagar
1998	Pranayavarnangal	Othiri Othiri Othiri Swapnangal	Vidyasagar
1998	Pranayavarnangal	Aaro Viral Neetti	Vidyasagar
1998	Aalibaabayum Aarara Kallanmaarum	Pon kinaakkal	Berny Ignatius
1998	Malabaril Ninnoru Manimaaran	Peelikkombil	Rajamani
1998	Malabaril Ninnoru Manimaaran	Panineerkkulir	Rajamani
1998	Malabaril Ninnoru Manimaaran	Thappodu thakilodu	Rajamani
1998	Malabaril Ninnoru Manimaaran	Ayyayyo meyyoram	Rajamani
1998	Malabaril Ninnoru Manimaaran	Swarnamaan kidaave	Rajamani
1998	Oro Viliyum Kaathorthu	Konnappookkal	Berny Ignatius
1998	Oro Viliyum Kaathorthu	Vidacholliyakalunna	Berny Ignatius
1998	Dil Se..	Jiya Jale (Malayalam lines)	A. R. Rahman
1998	Uyire..	Nenjinile (Malayalam lines)	A. R. Rahman
1998	Anappaara Achamma	Peelippoove Naanam	NP Prabhakaran
1998	Anappaara Achamma	Thankachuvadukal	NP Prabhakaran
1998	Anappaara Achamma	Kandumuttumbam	NP Prabhakaran
1998	Dhraavidam	Engum Chandrika	Bhanu Chander
1998	Dhraavidam	Chandamaama	Bhanu Chander
1998	Dhraavidam	Chellappoo Ponpoo	Bhanu Chander
1998	Dhraavidam	Hey Mister	Bhanu Chander
1999	Gaandhiyan	Niraparayaaro	Nadirsha
1999	Gaandhiyan	Muttathemaavin	Nadirsha
1999	Gaandhiyan	Poonthinkale Moovanthiyaal	Nadirsha
1999	Gaandhiyan	Raghupathi Raghava	Nadirsha
1999	James Bond	Mizhiyoram	Berny Ignatius
1999	James Bond	Moovanthi	Berny Ignatius
1999	James Bond	Chakkinu Vechathu	Berny Ignatius
1999	Pallaavoor Devanarayanan Songs & Screenplay	Kannilthiri	Raveendran
1999	Pallaavoor Devanarayanan Songs & Screenplay	Sanchararadharasudha	Raveendran
1999	Pallaavoor Devanarayanan Songs & Screenplay	Vaarthinkalaal	Raveendran
1999	Pallaavoor Devanarayanan Songs & Screenplay	Sindooraaruna Vigrahaam	Raveendran
1999	Pallaavoor Devanarayanan Songs & Screenplay	Poliyopoli	Raveendran
1999	Pallaavoor Devanarayanan Songs & Screenplay	Eelapulayante	Raveendran
1999	Pallaavoor Devanarayanan Songs & Screenplay	Pulari nilavu	Raveendran
1999	Usthaad	Dil Aage Aage	Vidyasagar
1999	Usthaad	Naadodipoothinkal	Vidyasagar
1999	Usthaad	Vennilaakkombile	Vidyasagar
1999	Usthaad	Chandramukhi Nadithan	Vidyasagar
1999	Megham	Manjukaalam	Ouseppachan
1999	Megham	Vilakku vaykkum	Ouseppachan
1999	Megham	Thumbayum thulasiyum	Ouseppachan
1999	Megham	Markazhiye mallikaye	Ouseppachan
1999	Megham	Njan oru paattu paadaam	Ouseppachan
1999	English Medium	Anuraagappuzhavakkil	Raveendran
1999	English Medium	Cholleedaam sullu sundari	Raveendran
1999	English Medium	Thulumbum	Raveendran
1999	English Medium	Vellaaram kunnathu	Raveendran
1999	English Medium	Nilaavo neermizhithaamarayil	Raveendran
1999	English Medium	Veyilinte	Raveendran
1999	Angane Oru Avadhikkaalathu	Praseeda devi	Johnson
1999	Angane Oru Avadhikkaalathu	Raavil	Johnson
1999	Angane Oru Avadhikkaalathu	Pular veyilum	Johnson
1999	Angane Oru Avadhikkaalathu	Kadanamariyum	Johnson
1999	Vaazhunnor	Mathimukhi	Ouseppachan
1999	Vaazhunnor	Ponnaanappuramerana	Ouseppachan
1999	Vaazhunnor	Azhake	Ouseppachan
1999	Vaazhunnor	Sandhyayum	Ouseppachan
1999	Vaazhunnor	Azhake annoraavaniyil	Ouseppachan
1999	Olympian Antony Adam	Kokki Kurungiyum	Ouseppachan
1999	Olympian Antony Adam	Nilaappaithale	Ouseppachan
1999	Olympian Antony Adam	Ey Chumma	Ouseppachan
1999	Olympian Antony Adam	Kadambanaattu Kaalavela	Ouseppachan
1999	Olympian Antony Adam	Kunnela	Ouseppachan
1999	Olympian Antony Adam	One Little	Ouseppachan
1999	Olympian Antony Adam	Peppera pera pera perakka	Ouseppachan
1999	Ezhupunna Tharakan	Thekkan kaatte	Vidyasagar
1999	Ezhupunna Tharakan	Minnum nilaathinkalaay	Vidyasagar
1999	Ezhupunna Tharakan	Enne maranno	Vidyasagar
1999	Ezhupunna Tharakan	Thekku Thekku	Vidyasagar
1999	Ezhupunna Tharakan	Melevinninmuttathaare	Vidyasagar
1999	Aayiram Meni	Maanathampili	SP Venkitesh
1999	Aayiram Meni	Thiri Thaazhum	SP Venkitesh
1999	Aayiram Meni	Chillalamaalakal	SP Venkitesh
1999	Aayiram Meni	Nadi Nadi	SP Venkitesh
1999	Aayiram Meni	Ponnu Vithachaalum	SP Venkitesh
1999	Tokyo Nagarile Visheshangal	Sur Barsaaye Theri	Sunny Stephen
1999	Tokyo Nagarile Visheshangal	Minnaaminni Ponnum Muthe	Sunny Stephen
1999	Tokyo Nagarile Visheshangal	Enthininnum	Sunny Stephen
1999	Tokyo Nagarile Visheshangal	Swarnameda	Sunny Stephen
1999	Tokyo Nagarile Visheshangal	Venpraavukal	Sunny Stephen
1999	Niram	Shukriya Shukriya	Vidyasagar
1999	Niram	Yaathrayaay	Vidyasagar
1999	Niram	Minnithennum Nakshathrangal	Vidyasagar
1999	Charlie Chaplin	Kunjumaanpedayo	Wilson
1999	Charlie Chaplin	Chillamele	Wilson
1999	Charlie Chaplin	Kurukurunnu	Wilson
1999	Pathram	Swarna Paathrathaal	SP Venkitesh
1999	Varnachirakukal	Varnachirakukal	M Jayachandran
1999	Varnachirakukal	Nirangal Nirangal	M Jayachandran
1999	Holi	Raapoovil Thoomanjo	Berny Ignatius
1999	Holi	Mizhikal	Berny Ignatius
1999	Holi	Holi Holi	Berny Ignatius
1999	Holi	Saayam Sandhya	Berny Ignatius
2000	Punaradhivaasam Best Lyricist Award 2000	Paadunnu Vishuppakshikal	G Venugopal
2000	Punaradhivaasam Best Lyricist Award 2000	Kanakamjunthirikal	Sivamani, Louis Banks
2000	Punaradhivaasam Best Lyricist Award 2000	Swantham Chirakinte	Sivamani, Louis Banks
2000	Punaradhivaasam Best Lyricist Award 2000	Kannadipookkal Pookkunnu	Sivamani, Louis Banks
2000	Punaradhivaasam Best Lyricist Award 2000	Swantham Chirakinte	Sivamani, Louis Banks
2000	Sradha	Aadyaanuraagam	Bharadhwaj
2000	Sradha	Neeyen Jeevanil	Bharadhwaj
2000	Sradha	Megharaagathil	Bharadhwaj
2000	Sradha	Chola Malamkaattadikkanu	Bharadhwaj
2000	Sradha	Party Party Time	Bharadhwaj
2000	Sradha	Onnu Thottene Ninne	Bharadhwaj
2000	Cover Story	Ini maanathum	Sharreth
2000	Cover Story	Manjilpookkum	Sharreth
2000	Cover Story	Yaamangal	Sharreth
2000	Millennium Stars	Oh Mumbai	Vidyasagar
2000	Millennium Stars	Shraavangange	Vidyasagar
2000	Millennium Stars	Kukku Kukku Theevandi	Vidyasagar
2000	Millennium Stars	Parayaan Njaan Marannu	Vidyasagar
2000	Dreamz	Raathriyil	Vidyasagar
2000	Dreamz	Pakkaala Nilabadi	Vidyasagar
2000	Dreamz	Ee Parakkum	Vidyasagar
2000	Dreamz	Kannil Kaashithumba	Vidyasagar
2000	Dreamz	Manimuttathaavani	Vidyasagar
2000	Dreamz	Vaarthinkal Thellalle	Vidyasagar
2000	Indulekha	Ven Praavukal	Samji Aaraattupuzha
2000	Swayamvarappanthal	Kanninila Kai	Johnson
2000	Swayamvarappanthal	Manjil Meyanam	Johnson
2000	Narasimham	Aarodum onnum mindathe	MG Radhakrishnan
2000	Narasimham	Manjin mutheduthu	MG Radhakrishnan
2000	Narasimham	Pazhanimala	MG Radhakrishnan
2000	Narasimham	Amme Nile	MG Radhakrishnan
2000	Narasimham	Dhyaanam dheyam	MG Radhakrishnan
2000	Pilots	Poo poothu minni thennum	MG Radhakrishnan
2000	Pilots	Navarasa saarasa	MG Radhakrishnan
2000	Pilots	Doore pooppambaram	MG Radhakrishnan
2000	Sathyameva Jayathe	Poove Poove	M Jayachandran
2000	Valyettan	Smaraami	Mohan Sithara
2000	Valyettan	Shivamallippoo Pozhikkum	Mohan Sithara
2000	Valyettan	Niranazhi Ponnin	Mohan Sithara
2000	Valyettan	Arupathu thiriyitta	Mohan Sithara
2000	Valyettan	Kannilambum Villum	Mohan Sithara
2000	Valyettan	Nettimele Pottittaalum	Mohan Sithara
2000	Ival Draupadi	Pakalppakshi	Perattupuram Madhu
2000	Ival Draupadi	Mizhi Nananju	Rajamani
2000	Ival Draupadi	Thaliridum	Rajamani
2000	Ival Draupadi	Nunachi Penne	Rajamani
2000	Ival Draupadi	Kalakalam	Sunil Bhaskar
2000	Ival Draupadi	Onnaam Veli	NP Prabhakaran
2000	Arayannangalude Veedu	Kaanaathe Melle	Raveendran
2000	Arayannangalude Veedu	Deenadayaalo Raamaa	Raveendran
2000	Arayannangalude Veedu	Manassin Manichimizhil	Raveendran
2000	Arayannangalude Veedu	Kakkapoo kaithapoo	Raveendran
2000	Mister Butler	Raaravenu	Vidyasagar
2000	Mister Butler	Virahini raadhe	Vidyasagar
2000	Mister Butler	Muthaaram	Vidyasagar
2000	Mister Butler	Kunuku Penmaniye	Vidyasagar
2000	Mister Butler	Nizhalaadum Deepame	Vidyasagar
2001	Raavanaprabhu Best Lyricist Award 2001	Aakasha deepangal	Suresh Peters
2001	Raavanaprabhu Best Lyricist Award 2001	Vande mukunda hare	Suresh Peters
2001	Raavanaprabhu Best Lyricist Award 2001	Pottu Kuthedi	Suresh Peters
2001	Raavanaprabhu Best Lyricist Award 2001	Thakilu Pukilu	Suresh Peters
2001	Raavanaprabhu Best Lyricist Award 2001	Aattoram azhakoram	Suresh Peters
2001	Raavanaprabhu Best Lyricist Award 2001	Ariyaathe Ariyaathe	Suresh Peters
2001	Mazhameghapravukal	Kanimalaraay	Palakkadu Sreeram
2001	Mazhameghapravukal	Sayya O Sayya	Palakkadu Sreeram
2001	Mazhameghapravukal	Maamarakkaavil	Palakkadu Sreeram
2001	Mazhameghapravukal	Kanne Kanmani	Palakkadu Sreeram
2001	Mazhameghapravukal	Pakalin padavil	Palakkadu Sreeram
2001	Goa	Nilaaviral Thalodave	Premkumar Vadakara
2001	Goa	Sirayil Eriyumee	Premkumar Vadakara
2001	Goa	Aakaasha Megha jalakam	Premkumar Vadakara
2001	Goa	Niramizhikkonil	Premkumar Vadakara
2001	Unnathangalil	Nakshtrangal Thilangum	Mohan Sithara
2001	Unnathangalil	Manippanthalil	Mohan Sithara
2001	Unnathangalil	Muthani Munthiri Vallikal	Mohan Sithara
2001	Ee Parakkumthalika	Arumayaam sandhyayodu	Ouseppachan
2001	Ee Parakkumthalika	Ka Kaattile	Ouseppachan
2001	Ee Parakkumthalika	Pathu Pavanil	Ouseppachan
2001	Ee Parakkumthalika	Kuppivala Kaikalum	Ouseppachan
2001	Ee Parakkumthalika	Parakkum Thalika	Ouseppachan
2001	Randaam Bhaavam	Mehboobe Mehboobe	Vidyasagar
2001	Randaam Bhaavam	Marannittumenthino	Vidyasagar
2001	Randaam Bhaavam	Kis lahem	Vidyasagar
2001	Randaam Bhaavam	Venpraave	Vidyasagar
2001	Randaam Bhaavam	Amma Nakshathrame	Vidyasagar
2001	Randaam Bhaavam	Marannittumenthino	Vidyasagar
2001	Saiver Thirumeni	Aarum Aarum Pinvili	Raveendran
2001	Saiver Thirumeni	Aruvikalude	Raveendran
2001	Saiver Thirumeni	Muttathemullathai	Raveendran
2001	Saiver Thirumeni	Allikkallilu Vellam Kootti	Raveendran
2001	Saiver Thirumeni	Japakodigunam	Raveendran
2001	Saiver Thirumeni	Yesunaayaka	Raveendran
2001	Red Indians	Pakal mazha	SP Venkitesh
2001	Red Indians	Kannaadippuzha Paadi	SP Venkitesh
2001	Red Indians	Hoyyaare hoyyaare	SP Venkitesh
2001	Red Indians	I love you	SP Venkitesh
2001	Dubai	Mukil Mudi	Vidyasagar
2001	Dubai	Oru Paattin	Vidyasagar
2001	Dubai	Saandhyathaaram	Vidyasagar
2001	Dubai	Yaduvamsha Yaamini	Vidyasagar
2001	Dubai	Hai Hillalin Thanka	Vidyasagar
2001	Vakkaalathu Narayanankutti	Vaanaville Minnalkkodiye	Mohan Sithara
2001	Vakkaalathu Narayanankutti	Kulambadichum	Mohan Sithara
2001	Vakkaalathu Narayanankutti	Maangalyakaalam	Mohan Sithara
2001	Praja	Yeh zindagi	MG Radhakrishnan
2001	Praja	Chandanamani	MG Radhakrishnan
2001	Praja	Akeleyaanengilum	MG Radhakrishnan
2001	Praja	Raagathennale	MG Radhakrishnan
2001	Korappan The Great	Kalakalam Paadum	Balabhaskar
2001	Korappan The Great	Vattu Pidichoru	Balabhaskar
2001	Korappan The Great	Novubhaaram Chumalil	Balabhaskar
2001	Sharjah To Sharjah	Pathinalam	Mohan Sithara
2001	Sharjah To Sharjah	Chandanathennal	Mohan Sithara
2001	Sharjah To Sharjah	Dhu dhu	Mohan Sithara
2001	Sharjah To Sharjah	Neelakkayalil ninmizhiyinakal	Mohan Sithara
2001	Kaakkakkuyil	Unnikkanna	Deepan Chatterji
2001	Kaakkakkuyil	Govinda govinda	Deepan Chatterji
2001	Kaakkakkuyil	Megharaagam	Deepan Chatterji
2001	Kaakkakkuyil	Paadaam vanamaali	Deepan Chatterji
2001	Kaakkakkuyil	Kaakkakuyile	Deepan Chatterji
2001	Kaakkakkuyil	Aaraarum Kandillenno	Deepan Chatterji
2001	Kaakkakkuyil	Ponnumani Kannanunni	Deepan Chatterji
2001	Swarnna Chirakumaay	Ennumennum	Ouseppachan
2001	Swarnna Chirakumaay	Ohm Durga Nee	Ouseppachan
2001	Swarnna Chirakumaay	Onnalla Randalla	Ouseppachan
2001	Swarnna Chirakumaay	Kaattumulle Kannaadi	Ouseppachan
2001	Swarnna Chirakumaay	Maayunnuvo Pakal	Ouseppachan
2001	Chethaaram	Ennuyire	Mohan Sithara
2001	Chethaaram	Aakaasha Pooppaadam	Mohan Sithara
2001	Chethaaram	Iniyoru Gaanam	Mohan Sithara
2001	Chethaaram	Manasse Ninte	Mohan Sithara
2001	Chethaaram	Medakkaattine	Mohan Sithara
2001	Chethaaram	Rakthasaakshikale	Mohan Sithara
2001	Chethaaram	Viranchadhi Deva	Mohan Sithara
2001	Police Academy	Aazhikkum	Johnson
2001	Police Academy	Kurukkuthi	Johnson
2001	Police Academy	Alliyaambal	Johnson
2001	Police Academy	Kaalindiyil	Johnson
2002	Phantom	Kurum kuzhal osai	Deva
2002	Phantom	Viral thottal	Deva
2002	Phantom	Sunu mithuvale	Deva
2002	Phantom	Maattupongal	Deva
2002	Phantom	Theme Song	Deva
2002	Chakkarakkudam	Neelappolayante	Raveendran
2002	Chakkarakkudam	Paanan thudi	Raveendran
2002	Chakkarakkudam	Yamuna nadiyude	Raveendran
2002	Chakkarakkudam	Chakkarakkudam	Raveendran
2002	Kanalkkireedam	Oru Punchiriyil	Berny Ignatius
2002	Kadha	Yaathrayaavume	Ouseppachan
2002	Kadha	Thathum	Ouseppachan
2002	Kadha	Vaarmegha	Ouseppachan
2002	Kadha	Mazhayulla Raathriyil	Ouseppachan
2002	Kadha	Oduvilee sandhyayum	Ouseppachan
2002	Anuraagam	Olavaalan	Rajamani
2002	Anuraagam	Swarnamaane	Rajamani
2002	Onnaaman	Kadukedu	SP Venkitesh
2002	Onnaaman	Vattalla Vattiyilla	SP Venkitesh
2002	Onnaaman	Piranna Mannil	SP Venkitesh
2002	Onnaaman	Poove Vaa	SP Venkitesh
2002	Onnaaman	Mizhiyithalil	SP Venkitesh
2002	Onnaaman	Maanathe Thudiyunarum	SP Venkitesh
2002	Kuberan	Kanakachilanka	Mohan Sithara
2002	Kuberan	Oru Mazhappakshi	Mohan Sithara
2002	Kuberan	Manimukile	Mohan Sithara
2002	Kuberan	Kannivasantham	Mohan Sithara
2002	Nandanam Best Lyricist Award 2002	Kaarmukil	Raveendran
2002	Nandanam Best Lyricist Award 2002	Gopike	Raveendran
2002	Nandanam Best Lyricist Award 2002	Manassil midhuna	Raveendran
2002	Nandanam Best Lyricist Award 2002	Mouliyil	Raveendran
2002	Nandanam Best Lyricist Award 2002	Sreelavasantham	Raveendran
2002	Nandanam Best Lyricist Award 2002	Aarum Kanathe	Raveendran
2002	Meesa Madhavan	Karimizhikkuruviye	Vidyasagar
2002	Meesa Madhavan	Vaaleduthaal	Vidyasagar
2002	Meesa Madhavan	Ente Ellaamellaamalle	Vidyasagar
2002	Meesa Madhavan	Penne Penne ...	Vidyasagar
2002	Meesa Madhavan	Chingamaasam	Vidyasagar
2002	Meesa Madhavan	Pathiri Chuttu .	Vidyasagar
2002	Jagathy Jagadeesh in Town	Idiminnalaay Kodi	Shakeer Jackson
2002	Jagathy Jagadeesh in Town	Kaalamitha Ee Kaliyile	Shakeer Jackson
2002	Bamboo Boys	Olakkai Kondu Thaalam	Thej Manoj
2002	Bamboo Boys	Eninnale Choppanam	Thej Manoj
2002	Bamboo Boys	Om Jaya Showre	Thej Manoj
2002	Bamboo Boys	Karutha Kozhi	Thej Manoj
2002	Bamboo Boys	Bamboo Boys	Thej Manoj
2002	Bamboo Boys	Karutha Muthe	Thej Manoj
2002	Chirikkudukka	Thaarakal Pookkumee	Vinu Kiriyath
2002	Chirikkudukka	Poo Viriyumee	Vinu Kiriyath
2002	Chirikkudukka	Kaneerin	Vinu Kiriyath
2002	Chirikkudukka	Ennittumenthe	Vinu Kiriyath
2002	Chirikkudukka	Salomiya	Vinu Kiriyath
2002	Chirikkudukka	Hridayam Thudiyaay	Vinu Kiriyath
2002	Chirikkudukka	Ikkilikkurunnu	Vinu Kiriyath
2002	Chirikkudukka	Kudamulla	Vinu Kiriyath
2002	Kaakke Kaakke Koodevide	Sundariye Sundariye	Vidyasagar
2002	Kaakke Kaakke Koodevide	Oliche Oliche	Vidyasagar
2002	Desham	Thudikkum Thaamarapoove	Rajamani
2002	Desham	Neelaanjanam	Rajamani
2002	Desham	Vaalongi Porinirangi	Rajamani
2002	Chathurangam	Mizhiyil	MG Sreekumar
2003	Manassinakkare	Marakudayaal	Ilayaraja
2003	Manassinakkare	Chendaykkoru kolundeda	Ilayaraja
2003	Manassinakkare	Chellathathe	Ilayaraja
2003	Manassinakkare	Thankathinkal Vaanil	Ilayaraja
2003	Manassinakkare	Melleyonnu Paadi Ninne	Ilayaraja
2003	Thillaana Thillaana	Shabby Baby Sharon Baby	Thankaraj
2003	Thillaana Thillaana	Kanimullakal Poothathu Pole	Thankaraj
2003	Thillaana Thillaana	Aareyum Kothippikkum	Thankaraj
2003	Thillaana Thillaana	Kandaal Minda Vaayaadi	Thankaraj
2003	Thillaana Thillaana	I Just Can't Understand	Thankaraj
2003	Swapnam Kondu Thulaabhaaram	Kasthoorikkuri Thottu	Ouseppachan
2003	Swapnam Kondu Thulaabhaaram	Thottu Vilichaalo	Ouseppachan
2003	CID Moosa	Chilambolikkaatte	Vidyasagar
2003	CID Moosa	Kaadirangi odivarum	Vidyasagar
2003	CID Moosa	James Bondin	Vidyasagar
2003	CID Moosa	Theeppori Pambaram	Vidyasagar
2003	CID Moosa	Maine Pyarkiya	Vidyasagar
2003	Pattaalam	Dinkiri Dinkiri	Vidyasagar
2003	Pattaalam	Aaroraal	Vidyasagar
2003	Pattaalam	Anthimaanathu	Vidyasagar
2003	Pattaalam	Vennakkallil	Vidyasagar
2003	Pattaalam	Pamba ganapathi	Vidyasagar
2003	Pattaalam	Aalilakkaavile	Vidyasagar
2003	Gramaphone	Enthe Innum Vanneela	Vidyasagar
2003	Gramaphone	Ninakkente	Vidyasagar
2003	Gramaphone	Vilichathenthinu	Vidyasagar
2003	Gramaphone	Paikkurumbiye Meykkum	Vidyasagar
2003	Cheri	Pookkumbil	Raveendran
2003	Cheri	Koodariya Pakshikale	Raveendran
2003	Cheri	Chendayedukkuka	Raveendran
2003	Cheri	Manasse Manasse	Raveendran
2003	Mullavalliyum Thenmaavum	Thaamaranoolinaal	Ouseppachan
2003	Mullavalliyum Thenmaavum	Chittikuruvi	Ouseppachan
2003	Mullavalliyum Thenmaavum	Ninakkum Nilaavil	Ouseppachan
2003	Mullavalliyum Thenmaavum	Dhumthanakkadi	Ouseppachan
2003	Mullavalliyum Thenmaavum	Pachappalunke	Ouseppachan
2003	Mullavalliyum Thenmaavum	Anthinilaa Chemparunthe	Ouseppachan
2003	Mullavalliyum Thenmaavum	Ninave En Ninave Pozhiyum	Ouseppachan
2003	Mullavalliyum Thenmaavum	Kadalilaki Karayodu Cholli	Ouseppachan
2003	Ente Veedu Appoontem	Doore Oru Kurunnilam	Ouseppachan
2003	Ente Veedu Appoontem	Thappo Thappo	Ouseppachan
2003	Ente Veedu Appoontem	Vaavavo Vaave	Ouseppachan
2003	Mr Brahmachaari	Ninne Kandaal	Mohan Sithara
2003	Mr Brahmachaari	Kaanaakkoodu thedi	Mohan Sithara
2003	Mr Brahmachaari	Ekaanthamaayi	Mohan Sithara
2003	Mr Brahmachaari	Thidambeduthu	Mohan Sithara
2003	Mr Brahmachaari	Kaananakkuyile	Mohan Sithara
2003	Mr Brahmachaari	Bhajare	Mohan Sithara
2003	Mr Brahmachaari	Thidambedutha Vambanaaya	Mohan Sithara
2003	Gourishankaram Best Lyricist Award 2003	Krishna bolo	M Jayachandran
2003	Gourishankaram Best Lyricist Award 2003	Thiriyeriyunna	M Jayachandran
2003	Gourishankaram Best Lyricist Award 2003	Urangaathe	M Jayachandran
2003	Gourishankaram Best Lyricist Award 2003	Kannil Kannil	M Jayachandran
2003	Chakram	Parannu Parannu Paarum	Raveendran
2003	Chakram	Pattam Kanakkinu	Raveendran
2003	Chakram	Koothu Kummi	Raveendran
2003	Balettan	Karu karuthoru	M Jayachandran
2003	Balettan	Chilu chilum	M Jayachandran
2003	Balettan	Cholakkiliye	M Jayachandran
2003	Balettan	Innale Ente Nenchile	M Jayachandran
2003	Valathottu Thirinjaal Naalamathe Veedu	Maan Kidaavu	Shakeer Jackson
2003	Valathottu Thirinjaal Naalamathe Veedu	Novurangum	Shakeer Jackson
2003	Valathottu Thirinjaal Naalamathe Veedu	Pennaayaal	Shakeer Jackson
2003	Valathottu Thirinjaal Naalamathe Veedu	Kotta Kothalam	Shakeer Jackson
2003	Valathottu Thirinjaal Naalamathe Veedu	Manjurukum	Shakeer Jackson
2003	Valathottu Thirinjaal Naalamathe Veedu	Va Va Vaayaadi	Shakeer Jackson
2003	Vasanthamaalika	Poomukhthoru	Perumbavoor G Ravindranath
2003	Vasanthamaalika	Manassinullil	Perumbavoor G Ravindranath
2003	Vasanthamaalika	Ennum Palavidha	Perumbavoor G Ravindranath
2003	Vasanthamaalika	Saittadikkana Maadhavaa	Perumbavoor G Ravindranath
2003	Vasanthamaalika	Koomanum Kurumanum	Perumbavoor G Ravindranath
2003	Magic Magic	Kanne Chellakkanne	Sharreth
2003	Magic Magic	Aaraanu Kuttichaathan	Sharreth, Jagan
2003	Magic Magic	Subi Su Subi Su	Sharreth, Jagan
2003	Magic Magic	Kaanaakkaattin	Sharreth, Jagan
2003	Magic Magic	Kanne Chellakkanne	Sharreth
2003	Madhuram	Manassilariyaa	Thej Manoj
2003	Madhuram	Anjanakkannanum Nee	Thej Manoj
2003	Madhuram	Mazhayaay Manju	Thej Manoj
2003	Melvilaasam Shariyaanu	Thaazhvaaram	Palakkadu Sreeram
2003	Melvilaasam Shariyaanu	Kannikkaavadi	Palakkadu Sreeram
2003	Melvilaasam Shariyaanu	Neelakkuyile	Palakkadu Sreeram
2003	Melvilaasam Shariyaanu	Vaadaamallippoovum	Palakkadu Sreeram
2003	Melvilaasam Shariyaanu	Dooreyo Megharaagam	Palakkadu Sreeram
2003	Melvilaasam Shariyaanu	Puzha Paadumee Paattil	Palakkadu Sreeram
2003	Melvilaasam Shariyaanu	Thiruthaalathudi Venam	Palakkadu Sreeram
2003	Melvilaasam Shariyaanu	Thaazhampoove	Palakkadu Sreeram
2004	Swarnna Medal	Malare Neeyurangoo	Simon
2004	Swarnna Medal	Thillaana Thillana	Simon
2004	Swarnna Medal	Chinga Naal Kili	Simon
2004	Swarnna Medal	Kinaavinte Kombil Vidarum	Simon
2004	Wanted	Changeduthu kaattiyaal	Deepan Chatterji, Sanjeev Lal
2004	Wanted	Ponnilave Pooveyile	Deepan Chatterji, Sanjeev Lal
2004	Wanted	Omale Nee	Deepan Chatterji, Sanjeev Lal
2004	Wanted	Kallaayippuzha kadavil	Deepan Chatterji, Sanjeev Lal
2004	Wanted	Mizhi thaamarappoovil	Deepan Chatterji, Sanjeev Lal
2004	Greetings	Ka kaakke	Raveendran
2004	Greetings	Sona sona	Raveendran
2004	Greetings	Thakilu thimila thabala	Raveendran
2004	Greetings	Oliche	Raveendran
2004	Greetings	Mizhikalil	Raveendran
2004	Mayilaattam	Maattupetti koyilile	M Jayachandran
2004	Mayilaattam	Thakkida Tharikida	M Jayachandran
2004	Mayilaattam	Kaattaadi kiliye vaa	M Jayachandran
2004	Mayilaattam	Maamzhayile	M Jayachandran
2004	Mayilaattam	Muthu maniye mutham	M Jayachandran
2004	Kerala House Udan Vilpanaykku	Kolamayil Penkodi	Ouseppachan
2004	Kerala House Udan Vilpanaykku	Maashe Edo Maashe	Ouseppachan
2004	Kerala House Udan Vilpanaykku	Vaanampaadi Aare Thedunnu	Ouseppachan
2004	Kerala House Udan Vilpanaykku	Thekkan Kaattil	Ouseppachan
2004	Kaakkakarumban	Chembakame	M Jayachandran
2004	Kaakkakarumban	Kuttaalam kuruvi	M Jayachandran
2004	Kaakkakarumban	Vallikkaavil	M Jayachandran
2004	Kaakkakarumban	Ettu nila pattanam	M Jayachandran
2004	Kaakkakarumban	Aattumazhachaarum	M Jayachandran
2004	Chathikkaatha Chanthu	Kaakkothi	Alex Paul
2004	Chathikkaatha Chanthu	Mazhameettum	Alex Paul
2004	Chathikkaatha Chanthu	Hosaina Hosaina	Alex Paul
2004	Chathikkaatha Chanthu	Minnaaminunge Ninne	Alex Paul
2004	Maambazhakkaalam	Kandu Kandu Kothi	M Jayachandran
2004	Maambazhakkaalam	Paranjilla Njaan Onnum	M Jayachandran
2004	Maambazhakkaalam	Alliyilam	M Jayachandran
2004	Maambazhakkaalam	Maambazhakaalam	M Jayachandran
2004	Maambazhakkaalam	Kaantha	M Jayachandran
2004	Kadhaavaseshan Best Lyricist Award 2004	Kannu Nattu Kaathirunnittum	M Jayachandran
2004	Kadhaavaseshan Best Lyricist Award 2004	Hridaya Vrindaavaniyil	M Jayachandran
2004	Akale	Aaraarumariyaathe	M Jayachandran
2004	Akale	Akale akale	M Jayachandran
2004	Akale	Pravukal	M Jayachandran
2004	Akale	Shaaronile Shishirame	M Jayachandran
2004	Akale	Nee Januvariyil Viriyumo	M Jayachandran
2004	Akale	Pinneyumetho	M Jayachandran
2004	Akale	Pranayini njaan	M Jayachandran
2004	Akale	Nira Sandhya Nizhal	M Jayachandran
2004	Rasikan	Mama nee mongathayya	Vidyasagar
2004	Rasikan	Thotturummi irikan	Vidyasagar
2004	Rasikan	Hara hara sankara	Vidyasagar
2004	Rasikan	Nee vaada themmadi	Vidyasagar
2004	Rasikan	Rasikan Rasikan	Vidyasagar
2004	Rasikan	Maarimazhaye	Vidyasagar
2004	Runway	Aduthingu Vannirunal	Suresh Peters
2004	Runway	Pulariyil oru	Suresh Peters
2004	Runway	Pattu vennila	Suresh Peters
2004	Runway	Shaaba Shaaba	Suresh Peters
2004	Runway	Oslama hailasa	Suresh Peters
2004	Runway	Kanmaniye	Suresh Peters
2004	Naatturajavu	Natturajave	M Jayachandran
2004	Naatturajavu	Que Cera Cera	M Jayachandran
2004	Naatturajavu	Kuttuvaal kuruvi	M Jayachandran
2004	Naatturajavu	Hey Raaja Ney Raaja	M Jayachandran
2004	Naatturajavu	May Maasam ...	M Jayachandran
2004	Aparichithan	Kanavukal	Suresh Peters
2004	Aparichithan	Pranaya	Suresh Peters
2004	Aparichithan	Manassukal	Suresh Peters
2004	Aparichithan	Kuyil paattil	Suresh Peters
2004	Aparichithan	Kaayaduthu	Suresh Peters
2004	Aparichithan	Maasam Maasam	Suresh Peters
2004	Kanninum Kannaadikkum	Thanichirikkumbam	M Jayachandran
2004	Kanninum Kannaadikkum	Thennalile	M Jayachandran
2004	Sathyam	Kaatte Kaatte	M Jayachandran
2004	CI Mahadevan 5 adi 4 inch	Aarambhakaniyaane	Berny Ignatius
2004	CI Mahadevan 5 adi 4 inch	Bolobolayya	Berny Ignatius
2004	CI Mahadevan 5 adi 4 inch	Thamburuvil Sruthi	Berny Ignatius
2004	CI Mahadevan 5 adi 4 inch	Kuttichaathante	Berny Ignatius
2004	CI Mahadevan 5 adi 4 inch	Vasanthachandra	Berny Ignatius
2004	CI Mahadevan 5 adi 4 inch	Thankatheril	Berny Ignatius
2004	Koottu	March Maasamaaye	Mohan Sithara
2004	Koottu	Thaane Paadum	Mohan Sithara
2004	Vaamanapuram Bus Route	Unnimavilooyalitta	Sonu Sisupal
2004	Vaamanapuram Bus Route	Enniyenni Chakkakkuru	Sonu Sisupal
2004	Vaamanapuram Bus Route	Niragopikkuri Chaarthi	Sonu Sisupal
2004	Vaamanapuram Bus Route	Vaamanapuramunde	Sonu Sisupal
2004	Vaamanapuram Bus Route	Thaane Thamburu Mooli	Sonu Sisupal
2004	Thekkekkara Super Fast	Thaliraambal	Ouseppachan
2004	Thekkekkara Super Fast	Mukkootti Mandaaram	Ouseppachan
2004	Thekkekkara Super Fast	Konchum Maine	Ouseppachan
2004	Thekkekkara Super Fast	Vara Suryan	Ouseppachan
2004	Thekkekkara Super Fast	Konchum Maine	Ouseppachan
2004	Thekkekkara Super Fast	Manjaadikkuru	Ouseppachan
2004	Thekkekkara Super Fast	Murali Kayyilenthi	Ouseppachan
2005	Achuvinte Amma	Enthu Paranjaalum	Ilayaraja
2005	Achuvinte Amma	Thaamarakkuruvikku	Ilayaraja
2005	Achuvinte Amma	Swaasathin Thaalam	Ilayaraja
2005	Kochiraajaavu	Moonnuchakravandi	Vidyasagar
2005	Kochiraajaavu	Viral Thottu Vilichaal	Vidyasagar
2005	Kochiraajaavu	Munthirippaadam	Vidyasagar
2005	Kochiraajaavu	Sooryan Neeyaaneda	Vidyasagar
2005	Kochiraajaavu	Kinaavin Kilikale	Vidyasagar
2005	Kochiraajaavu	Muttathe Mullappenninu	Vidyasagar
2005	Chandrolsavam	Muttathethum	Vidyasagar
2005	Chandrolsavam	Ponmulam	Vidyasagar
2005	Chandrolsavam	Aaraarum Kaanaathe	Vidyasagar
2005	Ponmudipuzhayorathu	Maankutti Mainakkutti	Ilayaraja
2005	Ponmudipuzhayorathu	Naadaswaram ketto	Ilayaraja
2005	Ponmudipuzhayorathu	Oru Chiri Kandaal	Ilayaraja
2005	Ponmudipuzhayorathu	Ammayenna vaakku	Ilayaraja
2005	Ponmudipuzhayorathu	Vazhimaaroo vazhimaaroo	Ilayaraja
2005	Ponmudipuzhayorathu	Pandathe Naattinpuram	Ilayaraja
2005	Twinkle Twinkle Little Star	Maanathe Thaamare	Ilayaraja
2005	Twinkle Twinkle Little Star	Ethetho Janmathil	Ilayaraja
2005	Twinkle Twinkle Little Star	Twinkle Twinkle	Ilayaraja
2005	Ananthabhadram	Thira Nurayum	MG Radhakrishnan
2005	Ananthabhadram	Minnaayam minnum	MG Radhakrishnan
2005	Ananthabhadram	Shivamallikkaavil	MG Radhakrishnan
2005	Ananthabhadram	Vasanthamundo	MG Radhakrishnan
2005	Ananthabhadram	Maalammallallooya	MG Radhakrishnan
2005	Ananthabhadram	Pinakkamaano	MG Radhakrishnan
2005	Pauran	Mauna nombara	Raghu Kumar
2005	Pauran	Oru nullu bhasmamaayi	Raghu Kumar
2005	Pauran	Thaamarappoove	Raghu Kumar
2005	Pauran	Lalsalam	Raghu Kumar
2005	Immini Nalloral	Koottukaree	M Jayachandran
2005	Immini Nalloral	Thattana Muttana	M Jayachandran
2005	Immini Nalloral	Komalavalli	M Jayachandran
2005	Immini Nalloral	Thattana Muttana	M Jayachandran
2005	Immini Nalloral	Onnu Kaanuvaan	M Jayachandran
2005	Raajamaanikyam	Paandimelam	Alex Paul
2005	Raajamaanikyam	Raja Raja Manikyam	Alex Paul
2005	Oru Punchiriyil	Maadapraavukal	Berny Ignatius
2005	Sarkar Dada	Salaam Salaam	M Jayachandran
2005	Sarkar Dada	Ruthu ruthu	M Jayachandran
2005	Sarkar Dada	Naadodippaattinte	M Jayachandran
2005	Sarkar Dada	Mandaarappoo Choriyum	M Jayachandran
2005	Sarkar Dada	Thulaaminnal	M Jayachandran
2005	Sarkar Dada	Tik Tik	M Jayachandran
2005	Alice In Wonderland	Kannil umma	Vidyasagar
2005	Alice In Wonderland	Pottu thottu ponnumani	Vidyasagar
2005	Alice In Wonderland	Maymaasam	Vidyasagar
2005	Alice In Wonderland	Tap dance	Vidyasagar
2005	Alice In Wonderland	Kukku kukku	Vidyasagar
2005	Udayon	Thiruvarangil	Ouseppachan
2005	Udayon	Angethala	Ouseppachan
2005	Dhobiwala	Kannaadippoompuzhayil	S Kumar
2005	Dhobiwala	Mayaamanassukalude	S Kumar
2005	Dhobiwala	Kiss kiss	S Kumar
2005	Dhobiwala	Dhanumaasa chandran	S Kumar
2005	Dhobiwala	Rim Jim Rim Jim	S Kumar
2005	Dhobiwala	Ammaanachirakiluyarnnoru	S Kumar
2005	Maanikyan	Navaraathri	Thej Mervin
2005	Maanikyan	Chik chik	Thej Mervin
2005	Maanikyan	Muttathe munthiri	Thej Mervin
2005	Maanikyan	Saayam Sandhyayil	Thej Mervin
2005	Maanikyan	Ponnarachu	Thej Mervin
2005	Maanikyan	Janmangalay	Thej Mervin
2005	Bus Conductor	Maanathe	M Jayachandran
2005	Bus Conductor	Kondotti	M Jayachandran
2005	Bus Conductor	Etho Raathrimazha	M Jayachandran
2005	Krithyam	Kaaval Vennilaave	D Udayakumar
2005	Krithyam	Kokkurumum Kaatte	D Udayakumar
2005	Thampuraankunnu	Thirithaazhunnu	Thej Mervin
2005	Thampuraankunnu	Sree Parvathi Bhamini	Thej Mervin
2005	Thampuraankunnu	Rim Jim Rim Jim	Thej Mervin
2005	Thampuraankunnu	Peelikkannil Kandu	Thej Mervin
2005	Thampuraankunnu	Oru Kudam Champagne	Thej Mervin
2006	Kilukkam Kilukilukkam	Kilukkam Kilukilukkam	Deepak Dev
2006	Kilukkam Kilukilukkam	Paattonnu Paadaan	Deepak Dev
2006	Madhu Chandralekha	Mallikappoo	M Jayachandran
2006	Madhu Chandralekha	Sukhamano	M Jayachandran
2006	Madhu Chandralekha	Thulli Thulli	M Jayachandran
2006	Madhu Chandralekha	Kusumavadana	M Jayachandran
2006	Kisaan	Ammanam Chemmanam	Johnson
2006	Kisaan	Aadichembada	Johnson, kaithapram vishwanathan
2006	Rasathanthram	Poo Kumkumapoo	Ilayaraja
2006	Rasathanthram	Thevaaram	Ilayaraja
2006	Rasathanthram	Aaattinkarayorathe	Ilayaraja
2006	Rasathanthram	Ponnaavani Paadam	Ilayaraja
2006	Vrindaavanam	Ambe Jaya	CV Ranjith
2006	Vrindaavanam	Aattikurukkiyen	CV Ranjith
2006	Vrindaavanam	Kasaru Kasaru	CV Ranjith
2006	Vrindaavanam	Ramzan Nilaavinte	CV Ranjith
2006	Vrindaavanam	Vasantha Masam	CV Ranjith
2006	Vadakkumnathan Story, Screenplay, Dialogues, Songs	Gange Thudiyil	Raveendran
2006	Vadakkumnathan Story, Screenplay, Dialogues, Songs	Kalabham Tharaam	Raveendran
2006	Vadakkumnathan Story, Screenplay, Dialogues, Songs	Oru Kili Paattu Moolave	Raveendran
2006	Vadakkumnathan Story, Screenplay, Dialogues, Songs	Neendidam Churunda	Raveendran
2006	Vadakkumnathan Story, Screenplay, Dialogues, Songs	Saarasamukhee Sakhee	Raveendran
2006	Vadakkumnathan Story, Screenplay, Dialogues, Songs	Paahi Paramporule	Raveendran
2006	Vadakkumnathan Story, Screenplay, Dialogues, Songs	Thathaka thathaka	Raveendran
2006	Pachakkuthira	Oru Thottaavaadi	Ilayaraja
2006	Pachakkuthira	Kalikonda	Ilayaraja
2006	Pachakkuthira	Butterfly	Ilayaraja
2006	Pachakkuthira	Varavelkkumo	Ilayaraja
2006	Balram v/s Tharadas	Mathaappoove	Jassie Gift
2006	Anuvaadamillaathe	Paathi Maayum	Berny Ignatius
2006	Anuvaadamillaathe	Muthu thooval	Berny Ignatius
2006	Anuvaadamillaathe	Chinni chinni	Berny Ignatius
2006	Anuvaadamillaathe	Mukilppoykayil	Berny Ignatius
2006	Anuvaadamillaathe	Pakalmulla	Berny Ignatius
2006	Anuvaadamillaathe	Priyathaarake	Berny Ignatius
2006	Prajapathi	Prajaapathy	Thej Mervin
2006	Prajapathi	Oru penkidaavu	Thej Mervin
2006	Prajapathi	Kuthira	Thej Mervin
2006	Prajapathi	Madhuram	Thej Mervin
2006	Prajapathi	Oru Penkidaavu	Thej Mervin
2006	Keerthichakra	Ghanashyaama	Joshua Sreedhar
2006	Keerthichakra	Mukile Mukile	Joshua Sreedhar
2006	Keerthichakra	Kaaveri Nadiye	Joshua Sreedhar
2006	Keerthichakra	Kunjaattakkaatte	Joshua Sreedhar
2006	Vaasthavam	Naadha	Alex Paul
2006	Vaasthavam	Arappavan Ponnu Kondu	Alex Paul
2006	Vaasthavam	Kadam konda	Alex Paul
2006	Vargam	Raajaadhiraajante	Thej Mervin
2006	Vargam	Paalaazhithumbi	Thej Mervin
2006	Vargam	Kakakkaribumuthe	Thej Mervin
2006	Vargam	Kaavalaayi	Thej Mervin
2006	Pakal	Enthithra Vaiki Nee Sandhye	MG Radhakrishnan
2006	Pakal	Iniyumen	MG Radhakrishnan
2006	Chakkaramuthu	Karineela kannil	M Jayachandran
2006	Chakkaramuthu	Kaakke kaakke	M Jayachandran
2006	Chakkaramuthu	Marannuvo Poomakale	M Jayachandran
2006	Devadaas	Parayaam Oru	Chakri
2006	Devadaas	En Ponne	Chakri
2006	Devadaas	Hey Babu	Chakri
2006	Devadaas	Manasse Manasse	Chakri
2006	Devadaas	Chaamchakkara	Chakri
2006	Devadaas	Kshamikku	Chakri
2006	Devadaas	Entho Entho	Chakri
2006	Devadaas	Ishtam Koodan	Chakri
2007	Changathipoocha	Athala Pithala	Ouseppachan
2007	Changathipoocha	Shararaanthal Minninilkkum	Ouseppachan
2007	Speed Track	Oru kinnaara	Deepak Dev
2007	Speed Track	Paattum Paadi	Deepak Dev
2007	Speed Track	Nerathe	Deepak Dev
2007	Speed Track	Kokkokko	Deepak Dev
2007	Avan Chaandiyude Makan	Manthrakkolusu	Sanjeev Lal
2007	Avan Chaandiyude Makan	Kuruthola	Sanjeev Lal
2007	Avan Chaandiyude Makan	Maampoo Pookkum	Sanjeev Lal
2007	Avan Chaandiyude Makan	Seenaimaamalakal	Sanjeev Lal
2007	Raakkilippaattu	Kanniludakkiya	Vidyasagar
2007	Raakkilippaattu	Dhum Dhum Dhum	Vidyasagar
2007	Raakkilippaattu	Omanathinkal	Vidyasagar
2007	Raakkilippaattu	Mazha Peythu Thornna	Vidyasagar
2007	Raakkilippaattu	Paalappoovin Lolaakkunde	Vidyasagar
2007	Raakkilippaattu	Raappadippakshi Ithile	Vidyasagar
2007	Paayum Puli	Minnana	Mohan Sithara
2007	Paayum Puli	Thankakkarimbinte	Mohan Sithara
2007	Paayum Puli	Kukku Kuruvay	Mohan Sithara
2007	Time	Oru Raappoo	Rahul Raj
2007	Goal	Oh Mariya	Vidyasagar
2007	Goal	Dona Madona	Vidyasagar
2007	Nagaram	Kurumkuzhal	Mohan Sithara
2007	Kaaki	Title Song	Deepak Dev
2007	Sooryan	Ishtakarrikku	Ilayaraja
2007	Sooryan	Vasantha Nilave	Ilayaraja
2007	Sooryan	Manasse Manasse	Ilayaraja
2007	Sooryan	Ambe Vaanee	Ilayaraja
2007	Sooryan	Paattellaam	Ilayaraja
2007	Sooryan	Shabdamaayi	Ilayaraja
2007	Ore Kadal	Nagaram	Ouseppachan
2007	Ore Kadal	Oru Kadalaay	Ouseppachan
2007	Ore Kadal	Manassinte	Ouseppachan
2007	Ore Kadal	Pranaya Sandhya	Ouseppachan
2007	Ore Kadal	Yamuna	Ouseppachan
2007	Heart Beats	Hey Mizhi mazha	George Peter
2007	Heart Beats	Om giridhaari	George Peter
2007	Heart Beats	Nadiye	George Peter
2007	Heart Beats	Va kozhi	George Peter
2007	Alibhai	Aadimegha Choodu Vatti	Alex Paul
2007	Alibhai	Karikku Karikku Chinkaari	Alex Paul
2007	Alibhai	Makkala Makkala	Alex Paul
2007	Kelkaatha Shabdam	Ariyamuthu Chellam	Yuvan Shankar Raja
2007	Kelkaatha Shabdam	Oh Innu Premam	Yuvan Shankar Raja
2007	Kelkaatha Shabdam	Paadukayo Paadukayo	Yuvan Shankar Raja
2007	Kelkaatha Shabdam	Maayakkuthirayil Varumo	Yuvan Shankar Raja
2007	Kelkaatha Shabdam	Lokam Valiyatho	Yuvan Shankar Raja
2007	Rock N Roll	Manjaadi Mazha punchiri	Vidyasagar
2007	Rock N Roll	Valayonnithaa kalanju	Vidyasagar
2007	Rock N Roll	Chandamaama	Vidyasagar
2007	Rock N Roll	Jirtuhana	Vidyasagar
2007	Rock N Roll	Raavereyaay poove	Vidyasagar
2007	Kadha Parayumbol	Maampullikkaavil	M Jayachandran
2007	Paranju Theeratha Visheshangal	Padaanum	M Jayachandran
2008	De Ingottu Nokkiye	Kodi Vacha	M Jayachandran
2008	Kerala Police	Povaadi Penne	Kailas Menon
2008	Vilaapangalkkappuram	Mullulla Murikkinmel	M Jayachandran
2008	Innathe Chinthavishayam	Kando Kando Kaakkakkuyile	Ilayaraja
2008	Innathe Chinthavishayam	Kasthoorippottum Thottu	Ilayaraja
2008	Innathe Chinthavishayam	Manassiloru Poomala	Ilayaraja
2008	One Way Ticket	Neer Mazhayude Marmaram	Rahul Raj
2008	One Way Ticket	Atom Bomb	Rahul Raj
2008	One Way Ticket	Mohiyuddeen	Rahul Raj
2008	Maadambi	Kalyaanakkacheri	M Jayachandran
2008	Maadambi	Ente Shaarike	M Jayachandran
2008	Maadambi	Amma Mazhakkaarinu	M Jayachandran
2008	Twenty 20	Ushassil	Berny Ignatius
2008	Twenty 20	Oh Priya	Berny Ignatius
2008	Twenty 20	Hey Dil Deewana	Berny Ignatius
2008	Kurukshethra	Jwaalamukhi	Sidharth Vipin
2008	Kurukshethra	Thathamma	Sidharth Vipin
2008	Kurukshethra	Oru Yaathraamozhiyode	Sidharth Vipin
2008	Aayudham	Poove Mehaboobe	Bijibal
2008	Swapnangalil Haisal Mary	Daivam Ente	Jerin antony
2008	Swapnangalil Haisal Mary	pon oleevin	Jerin antony
2009	Keralavarma Pazhassi Raaja	Ambum Kombum	Ilayaraja
2009	Keralavarma Pazhassi Raaja	Odathandil	Ilayaraja
2009	Orkkuka Vallappozhum	Nalla Maampooppaadam	M Jayachandran
2009	Orkkuka Vallappozhum	Etho Januvary Maasam	M Jayachandran
2009	Banaras	Tirichi Nazar	M Jayachandran
2009	Banaras	Chaanthu Thottille nin chandanam	M Jayachandran
2009	Banaras	Madhuram Gaayathi	M Jayachandran
2009	Banaras	Koovaram Kili pynkili	M Jayachandran
2009	Banaras	Shivagange Shilaagange	M Jayachandran
2009	Meghatheertham	Mazhayaal	Sharreth
2009	Meghatheertham	Bhaavayaami	Sharreth
2009	Meghatheertham	Maayunnu Pakal	Sharreth
2009	Meghatheertham	Kanneerumay	Sharreth
2009	Meghatheertham	Shaarada	Sharreth
2009	Meghatheertham	Ohm Dhyaanam Kondu	Sharreth
2009	Colours	Ho Kanmani	Suresh Peters
2009	Colours	Kumbaari Kombanaanedi	Suresh Peters
2009	Colours	Konchi Konchi	Suresh Peters
2009	Red Chillies	Mazhapeyyanu	M Jayachandran
2009	Red Chillies	Chendeloru Vandu	M Jayachandran
2009	Kadha Samvidhaanam Kunjacko	Neelakkoovala	M Jayachandran
2009	Inspector General	Mainappenne	M Jayachandran
2009	Bhagavaan	Meerayaayi	Joji Hohns
2009	Vellathooval	Kaattoram	Johnson
2009	Vellathooval	Kothi kothi	Johnson
2009	Vellathooval	Paathimaanja	Johnson
2009	Vellathooval	Pattuduthu	Johnson
2009	Ivar Vivaahitharaayaal	Enikku Paadaan	M Jayachandran
2009	Ivar Vivaahitharaayaal	Paazhmulam	M Jayachandran
2009	Ivar Vivaahitharaayaal	Sunday Sooryan	M Jayachandran
2009	Ee Pattanathil Bhootham	Aaro Nilaavaay	Shaan Rahman
2009	Ee Pattanathil Bhootham	Maamarangale	Shaan Rahman
2009	Ee Pattanathil Bhootham	Adipoli Bhootham	Shaan Rahman
2009	Vairam	Vennilaavu Kannu Vacha	M Jayachandran
2009	Vairam	Munthirikkurunnu	M Jayachandran
2009	Vairam	Nattu Paattu Ketto	M Jayachandran
2009	Utharaaswayamvaram	Bangalooru	M Jayachandran
2009	Utharaaswayamvaram	Amma Urangunnu	M Jayachandran
2009	Utharaaswayamvaram	Mallike Mallike	M Jayachandran
2009	Nammal Thammil	Priyane urangiyille	M Jayachandran
2009	Nammal Thammil	Uyire Urangiyille	M Jayachandran
2009	Nammal Thammil	Pottu thottu	M Jayachandran
2009	Nammal Thammil	Junile Nilamazhayil	M Jayachandran
2009	Nammal Thammil	Kabadi Kabadi	M Jayachandran
2009	Nammal Thammil	Siyonaa Sithaarin	M Jayachandran
2010	Cheriya Kallanum Valiya Policeum	Kannile	Thej Mervin
2010	Cheriya Kallanum Valiya Policeum	Kumaara	Thej Mervin
2010	April Fool	Kaattil	M Jayachandran
2010	April Fool	Sundariyaam	M Jayachandran
2010	Happy Husbands	Happy Husbands	M Jayachandran
2010	Happy Husbands	Etho Poonila	M Jayachandran
2010	Happy Husbands	Take it Easy	M Jayachandran
2010	Thaanthonni	Periya Thevare	Thej Mervin
2010	Thaanthonni	Aakashamariyathe	Thej Mervin
2010	Pramaani	Pramaani	M Jayachandran
2010	Pramaani	Thaamarapaadam	M Jayachandran
2010	Janakan	Olichirunne	M Jayachandran
2010	Paappee Appachaa	Paappee	Vidyasagar
2010	Paappee Appachaa	Kaattumaakkaan	Vidyasagar
2010	Nalla Paattukaarey	Nilaave Nilaave	Sharreth
2010	Nalla Paattukaarey	Chambaykka Chundane	Sharreth
2010	Nalla Paattukaarey	Aalaapam	Sharreth
2010	Nalla Paattukaarey	Muthukkili	Sharreth
2010	Nalla Paattukaarey	Amme Mookaambike	Sharreth
2010	Nalla Paattukaarey	Sharaab Paatil	Sharreth
2010	Nalla Paattukaarey	Oh Neelaambale	Sharreth
2010	Nalla Paattukaarey	May June Maasam	Sharreth
2010	Alexander The Great	Etho Oru Vaakkil	MG Sreekumar
2010	Shikkar	Sembakame	M Jayachandran
2010	Shikkar	Pinne Ennodonnum	M Jayachandran
2010	Shikkar	Pada Nayichu	M Jayachandran
2010	Shikkar	Enthedi Enthedi	M Jayachandran
2011	Collector	Maayum Maayaameghangale	Raghu Kumar
2012	Casanova	Omanichumma ...	Gowri Lakshmi
2012	Vaidooryam	Chandhanathennalaay	Vidyasagar
2012	Mullassery Madhavankutty Nemam Po	Paathimaayum Chandralekhe	Raveendran
2012	Kanneerinu Madhuram	Ittittu Veezhum	Sharreth
2012	Kanneerinu Madhuram	Karuna Cheyvaan	Sharreth
2012	Kanneerinu Madhuram	Aanandavrindaavanam	Sharreth
2013	Players (film)	Rosa poo	M Jayachandran
2013	Players (film)	Kothi Kothi Keeraan	M Jayachandran
2013	Players (film)	Dheem dheem	M Jayachandran
2013	Players (film)	Oru Padasaram	M Jayachandran
2013	Aattakkatha	Hemaambari	Raveendran
2013	Aattakkatha	Peythozhinju	Raveendran
2013	Aattakkatha	Nilakku mukalil	Raveendran
2013	Aattakkatha	Muthani Mani Viralal	Raveendran
2013	Aattakkatha	Sharada Neerada	Raveendran
2015	Namukkore Aakaasham	Kili Paadum	Natesh Shankar
2015	Namukkore Aakaasham	Chembakappooviral	Natesh Shankar
2019	Finals	Manju kalam Doore	Kailas Menon
2019	Vellimanithaalam	Ammayee Bhoomiyil	SP Venkitesh
2019	Vellimanithaalam	Sanyasi Kalla Sanyasi	SP Venkitesh
2019	Vellimanithaalam	Swarnathalikayumenthi	SP Venkitesh
2019	Pranayam	Yaathrayakum	Jerson Antony
2019	Pranayam	Kaattil	Jerson Antony
2019	Pranayam	Vasantha	Jerson Antony
