= Roopa Revathi =

Indian playback singer

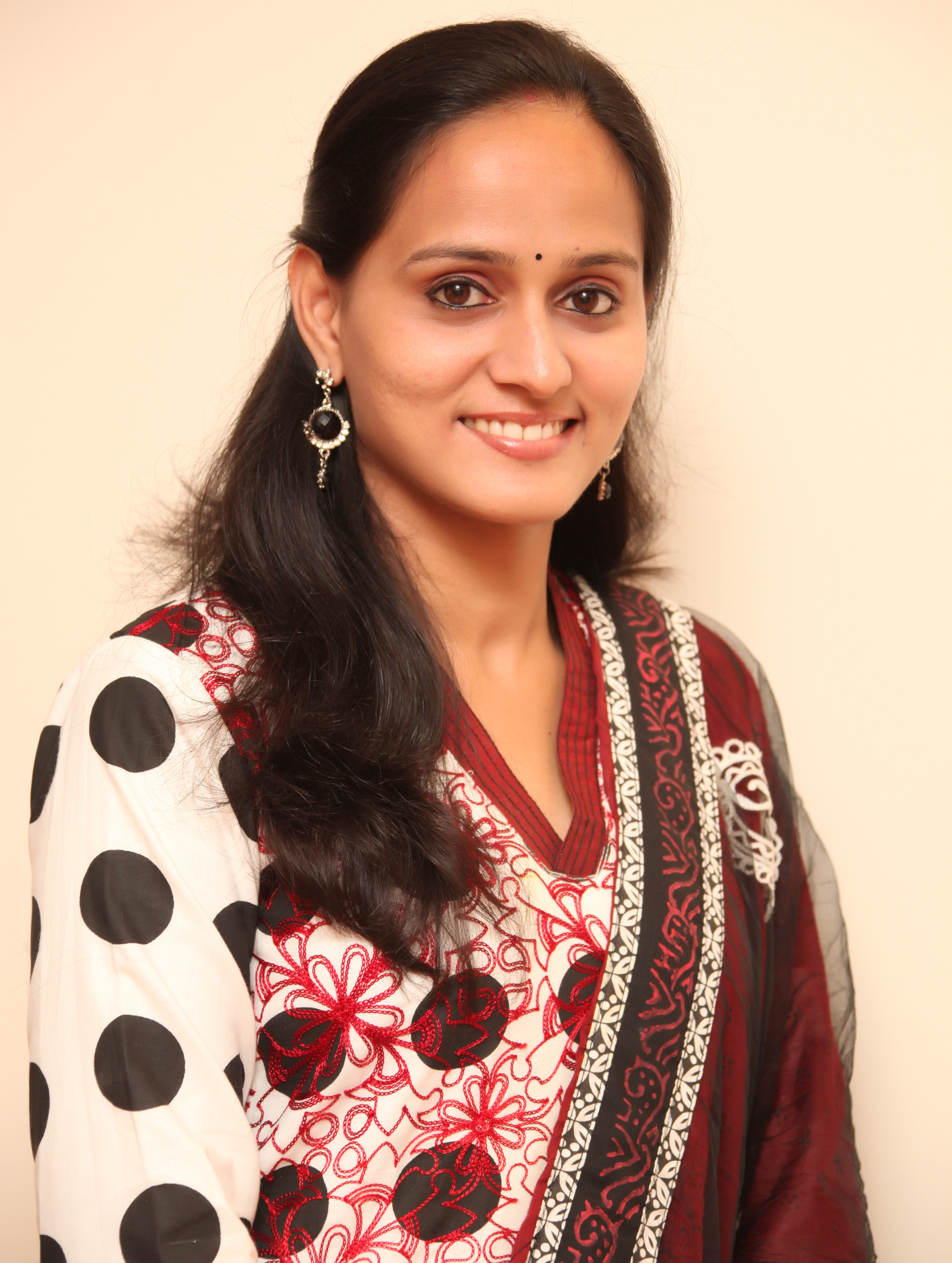

Background information
- Born: Roopa Kunnummel Ramapai
- Genres: Playback singing, Fusion music, Carnatic music, Indian music, World music
- Occupations: Violinist & playback singer
- Instrument: Violin
- Years active: 2008–present
- Website: Roopa Revathi official site

Roopa Revathi, also known as Roopa K.R., is an Indian musician, violinist and playback singer from Kerala. She started her career as a playback singer in the Malayalam movie Madampi in 2008. She has also recorded songs for Tamil and Kannada films. She was the winner of the reality show Super Star Global, a musical talent hunt show hosted by Amrita TV.

== Career ==
Revathi debuted as a playback singer in 2008 with the song "Ente Sharike" in B. Unnikrishnan's Malayalam film Madampi under music director M. Jayachandran.

In 2011, she debuted as a violinist in the Malayalam film industry through the film Urumi. Deepak Dev was the composer of the film.

=== Reality shows ===
- 2007 – Amrita TV Super Star Global Winner

== Discography ==
=== Malayalam ===
Year	Song	Film	Music	Co-singers	Lyrics
2017	Olangal Moodum	Gemini	Shaan Rahman		Anu Elizabeth Jose
2015	Ottathooval	Rajamma@Yahoo	Bijibal	Ganesh Sundaram	Ajith Kumar
2015	Akkare Ikkare	Thilothama	Deepak Dev	Sannidhanandan	Engandiyoor chandrasekharan
2012	Omanichumma	Casanovva	Gopi Sundar	Karthik, Vineeth Sreenivasan, Najim Arshad, Kalyani Nair, Gopi Sundar	Gireesh Puthenchery
2008	Ente Sharike	Madampi	M. Jayachandran	Sudeep Kumar	Gireesh Puthenchery

=== Tamil ===
Year	Song	Film	Music	Co-singers
2012	Dharmam Vazha	Chandramouli	Maragatha Mani	Sooraj Santhosh, Nithya
2012	A-Vandhu B-Male Modhi	Chandramouli	Maragatha Mani	Sachin
2011	Kadhal Raagam	Kaattu Puli	Vijay Verma	Prasanna
2011	Thaamarai Pookkaley	Kaattu Puli	Vijay Verma	Aalap Raju
2009	Manakkuyil	Payanangal Thodarum	V. Thashi	Anuraj

=== Albums ===
Year	Song	Album	Music	Record label	Co-singers
2017	Meere paadu nee	Meere Paadu Nee	Bijibal	Bodhi Silent Scape	
2014	Kamakshi Suprabatham	Kanchi Kamakshi		Abhirami Audios	Saindhavi
2014	Kamakshi Kavacham	Kanchi Kamakshi		Abhirami Audios	Saindhavi
2014	Kamakshi Mahimai	Kanchi Kamakshi		Abhirami Audios	Saindhavi
2014	Tattum Alaimeedu	Kalpataru	Kuldeep M. Pai	Chith Musicals	
2014	Krishnam – Quawwali with Naresh Iyer	Experience The feel of India		Kleuren	
2011	Paarinu Meete	Moonnaam Marian Carmel	Fr.Shaji Thumpechirayil	Abhirami Audios	
2011	Kaattinde Kaikalil	Aatmaragam	M. G. Radhakrishnan	Sathyam Audios	
2010	Sri Lalitha Sahasranamam		Kuldeep M. Pai	Dhvani Audios	
2009	Devagayakan	Hridayamuralika	Vidhyadharan Master	MSI Audios	
2009	Kavithayezhuthaan	Hridayamuralika	Vidyadharan Master	MSI Audios	
2009	Premashilpi (violin)	Hridayamuralika	Vidyadharan Master	MSI Audios	
2009	Madhuram Nin Chiri	Sandramadhuram	Vidyadharan Master	Avanangattil Kalari	
2009	Ente Pithave	The Priest	Fr. Shaji Thumpechirayil	Celebrants India	
2008	Ramanan	Ramanan	Edappally Ajith Kumar, Sreevalsan J. Menon	Manorama Music	
2008	Daivasneham	Yahove	Josekutty	Zion Classics	
2008	Nathanenikkekum	Yahove	Josekutty	Zion Classics	
