= Devaasuram =

Devasuram
- Poster published on newspaper
- Directed by: I. V. Sasi
- Written by: Ranjith
- Produced by: V. B. K. Menon
- Starring: Mohanlal; Revathi; Napoleon; Innocent
- Cinematography: V. Jayaram
- Edited by: K. Narayanan
- Music by: Songs: M. G. Radhakrishnan; Score: S. P. Venkatesh
- Production company: Anugraha Cine Arts
- Distributed by: Anugraha Release
- Release date: 14 April 1993
- Running time: 160 minutes
- Country: India
- Language: Malayalam
- Budget: ₹95 lakhs
- Box office: ₹4.30 crores

Devaasuram (transl. Of Gods and Demons) is a 1993 Indian Malayalam-language action drama film directed by I. V. Sasi and written by Ranjith. It stars Mohanlal, Revathi, and Napoleon, with Innocent, V. K. Sreeraman, Maniyanpilla Raju, and Augustine in supporting roles. The songs featured in the film were composed by M. G. Radhakrishnan, while S. P. Venkatesh composed the background score.

The film depicts the rivalry between two spoiled heirs of two feudal families—Mangalassery Neelakandan (Mohanlal) and Mundakkal Shekaran (Napoleon). The character Neelakandan was created by Ranjith based on a real-life person named Mullasserry Rajagopal (died 2002). The film was shot at Varikkasseri Mana in Ottappalam.

Devaasuram was a critically and commercially successful movie. It is considered to be a classic and the character of Mangalassery Neelakandan is considered one of the best roles of Mohanlal. It was followed by a sequel, Ravanaprabhu (2001), which was writer Ranjith's directorial debut. The film was remade in Telugu the same year as Kunti Putrudu.

== Plot ==
The story is set in the backdrop of Ezhilakkara village. Neelakandan, a feudal landlord, is the spoiled heir to the wealthy and well-known Mangalassery family. He squanders away his father's largess, wealth and good name who served as a judicial officer and is loved by the people who know him well, mainly Warrier, his elderly right-hand man. He has been the arch-rival of Shekaran Nambiar of the Mundakkal family since childhood. During a minor ruckus, one of Neelakandan's aides accidentally kills Shekaran's maternal uncle. This incites Shekaran to plan to avenge the death of his uncle. Having lost all the financial backups, Neelakandan agreed to sell his land for the construction of a Dance Centre near the village Temple. When a Gulf-returned son of an erstwhile landless Mappila farmer -who worked under the Mangalassery family- approached him for buying land, Neelakandan ridiculed him. However, later on, Neelakandan had to sell the land to the farmer's son at a low price. Meanwhile, Neelakandan offends Bhanumathi, a talented and educated Bharatanatyam dance graduate, by forcing her to dance in front of him in his house. In retaliation, Bhanumathi quits dancing and curses Neelakandan for desecrating the art so dear to her.

Later, Neelakandan feels regretful and helps her family in many ways and tries to persuade Bhanumathi to take up dancing again, but she doesn't budge. Meanwhile, Neelakandan visits his widowed mother intending to bring her back home, but she passes away after revealing a terrible secret; that he was born of another man, out of wedlock, without revealing the name of his biological father. This fact crushes him, and only Bhanumathi finds out this secret when he drunkenly curses (at the car of his deceased "father") that the ancestral heritage which he is proud of, is actually not his. She is surprised by the vulnerable side of Neelakandan. He visits Bhanumathi at her home to persuade her to take up dancing again, only to be refused like before, telling him that she will resume dancing only after his death. That night while returning home, Shekaran and his aides ambush (by hitting him with a car from behind) and injure him seriously after inflicting several wounds with swords, knives, iron rods, and wooden sticks. Neelakandan survives the attack, but his left hand and right leg are badly injured and he undergoes Ayurvedic treatment to rejuvenate his legs.

It is during this time that Bhanumathi falls in love with him (she is also regretful for having cursed him, feeling a guilty that the attack was somehow related to her curse). Neelakandan convinces Bhanumathi to dance and he arranges for a classical dance event for her in Delhi. He too loves her ardently, but he refuses to marry Bhanumathi considering her future, but in the end, Warrier persuades him to do so. Neelakandan tries to forget all the past events and his rivalry with Shekaran, but the latter is not satisfied. He wants to defeat Neelakandan in front of the whole village. For this, he kidnaps Bhanumathi and forces Neelakandan to take blows without retaliating in front of the public during the annual village temple festival organized by the Mundakkal family. Meanwhile, Neelakandan's friends rescue Bhanumathi and after this, Neelakandan fights back, defeating Shekaran. Then, he maims Shekaran by cutting off Shekaran's right hand, claiming "Shekaran, I want to live peacefully..." so that he will not come for revenge later. However, while severing Shekharan's hand, Neelakandan uses the backside of the sword, which shows the agony and power he had.

== Cast ==
- Mohanlal as Mangalassery Neelakandan (Neelan)
- Napoleon as Mundakkal Shekaran (voiceover by Shammi Thilakan)
- Revathi as Bhanumathi
- Innocent as Warrier
- Nedumudi Venu as Appukutty Nair / Appu master, Bhanumathi's father
- Maniyanpilla Raju as Bharathan
- V. K. Sreeraman as Kurup
- Ramu as Kunjananthan
- Augustine as Hydrose
- Cochin Haneefa as Achuthan, Appu master's nephew
- Janardhanan as Mundakkal Kunjikrishnan Nambiar, Shekharan's uncle (cameo)
- Chithra as Subhadramma
- Seetha as Sharada, Bhanumathi's younger sister
- Bharathi Vishnuvardhan as Yasodha, Neelakandan's mother
- Delhi Ganesh as Panicker (voice dubbed by prathapachandran)
- Sankaradi as Kuttikrishnan Nair
- Oduvil Unnikrishnan as Peringodu Sankara Marar
- Bheeman Raghu as 'Kallan' Chacko
- Sreenath as C. S., Neelan's Friend
- Jagannatha Varma as Adiyodi
- Jose Prakash as Ezhuthachan
- Kozhikode Narayanan Nair as Vaidyar
- Jagannathan as Poduval
- Subair as S.I. Madhu
- Sathaar as Vasu
- Kundara Johny as Krishnan, Shekharan's Brother in law
- Kollam Ajith as Babu, Shekharan's henchmen
- Vijayan Peringode as Neelan's uncle
- Pavitran as Veerankutty
- Nisha as Leela
- Karyavattam Sasikumar as Sub Inspector

== Production ==
The protagonist Mangalaserry Neelakandan (Mohanlal) is a real-life character sketch of Mullasserry Rajagopal (died 2002). Supposedly, some notable scenes in Devaasuram are real-life incidents. Varikassery Mana near Ottappalam was selected to portray the ancient Mangalaserry house. "It was only after Devaasuram became a hit that producers and directors began to queue up for this location. Until then only one film was shot here," says Murali, one of the managers of the mana. The climax scene of the movie was shot entirely in Pariyanampatta Bhagavathi Temple.

Mullasserry Rajagopal is known as an ardent music lover. "Music was the sole passion in his life. He was a good friend of mine, but we never discussed literature; we talked mainly about music and films," said renowned author M. T. Vasudevan Nair. M. T. was impressed by the way Rajagopal reacted to the setbacks in his life. "I was even more impressed by the way how his wife, Lakshmi, devoted her life to him; he would not have survived but for her." "I met him for the first time at K. J. Yesudas' bungalow in Chennai, way back in 1985," recalls playback singer G. Venugopal. "He was sitting on a wheelchair. I was told that his name was Raju. K. J. Yesudas, his close friend had brought him to Chennai for brain surgery." "I will never forget the evening director and script-writer Ranjith took me along to meet Raju," says director Jayaraj. "When I went there, a ghazal programme was going on; I could sense music everywhere in that house. I could also feel the extraordinary warmth of the man. I was surprised he could take life so lightly, despite being bed-ridden for about two decades. We became very good friends. Ranjith had told me that he was planning to make a film on Raju (Devaasuram). I believe that is the best work by Ranjith till date. Raju used to joke that Ranjith had not managed to show even half of what he did in his life." Oduvil's character was based on a real life Sopanam artist from Malabar, Njeralath Rama Pothuval. He was a vagabond sort of and was instrumental in bringing the art outside temple courtyards.

"There were [also] powerful business interests at work when I wrote my hits such as Devaasuram, Narasimham, Ravanaprabhu and so on...", said writer Ranjith.

== Soundtrack ==
Devaasuram

Soundtrack album by M. G. Radhakrishnan
- Released: 14 April 1993
- Recorded: 1993
- Studio: Prasad Studios Recording Theatre
- Genre: Feature film soundtrack
- Language: Malayalam
- Labels: Magnasound; Sony Music India
- Producer: M. G. Radhakrishnan

M. G. Radhakrishnan chronology
Adhwaytham (1992)	Devaasuram (1993)	Ammayane Sathyam (1993)

The film includes songs composed by M. G. Radhakrishnan, with lyrics by Gireesh Puthenchery. The background score was composed by S. P. Venkatesh.

The song "Vande Mukundahare" is picturised on Oduvil Unnikrishnan, in one of the most dramatic scenes in the film. Unnikrishnan plays the role of a wandering Edakka musician who frequently visits Neelakandan. The Edakka featured in the background of the song is played by Tripunithura Krishnadas.

Track	Title	Singer(s)	Notes
1	"Sree Paadam"	M. G. Sreekumar	Raga: Aarabhi, Anandabhairavi
2	"Ganga Tharanga" (Bit)	M. G. Sreekumar	Raga:Bowli
3	"Angopangam"	K. S. Chithra	Raga: Lalitha
4	"Maappu Nalku"	M. G. Sreekumar	Raga: Mukhari, Nattakurinji
5	"Kizhakkannam"	M. G. Radhakrishnan	
6	"Sooryakireedam"	M. G. Sreekumar	Raga: Chenchurutti
7	"Vande Mukundahare"	M. G. Radhakrishnan	Raga: Anandabhairavi
8	"Sree Paadam"	K. S. Chithra	Raga: Aarabhi, Anandabhairavi
9	"Medaponnaniyum"	M. G. Sreekumar, B. Arundhathi	Raga: Kadanakuthuhalam
10	"Maarimazhakal"	M. G. Sreekumar, Jaya	
11	"Namasthesthu" (Bit)	B. Arundhathi	Raga: Anandabhairavi; Traditional slokam by Sri Mahalakshmi Ashtakam
12	"Sarasijanaabha"	K. Omanakutty	Raga: Nagagandhari; Traditional keerthanam by Muthuswami Dikshitar
13	"Yamuna Kinaare" (Bit)	M. G. Sreekumar	

== Release ==
=== Box office ===
Devaasuram, released on 14 April 1993 during the season of Vishu. The film clashed with Mammootty's Vatsalyam, which released a few days before, and Kamal Hassan's Kalaignan, which was released on the same day. Despite stiff competition, the film fared better than its competitors and ended up becoming the 2nd biggest hit of the year completing 200 days of theatrical run. The movie made on a budget of ₹95 lakhs had earned the producer a profit of ₹35 lakhs, while the satellite right was sold for ₹6 lakhs.

=== Accolades ===
- Filmfare Award for Best Actor (Malayalam) – Mohanlal
- Cinema Express Award for Best Film (Malayalam)

== Sequel ==
Devaasuram was followed by a sequel, Ravanaprabhu, in 2001, written and directed by Ranjith in his directorial debut. Because of the success of the film, a number of films falling under the same genre with a feudal backdrop was produced in Malayalam cinema.

== Legacy ==
Devasuram is considered to be one of I. V. Sasi's best works. The film over the years has attained cult status. The characters played by Mohanlal (Mangalassery Neelakandan) and Napoleon (Mundakkal Shekaran) remain as two of the most iconic characters in Malayalam cinema with the character of Mangalassery Neelakandan celebrated as one of the finest anti-heroes. The success of the film led to many films being made based on feudal lords and ancestorial homes. The film made Varikassery Mana a popular tourist destination.
