= Pariyanampatta Bhagavathi Temple =

Sree Pariyanampatta Bhagavathy Temple

Religion
- Affiliation: Hinduism
- Deity: Pariyanampatta Bhagavathy Temple

Location
- Location: Kattukulam
- State: Kerala
- Country: India
- Interactive map of Sree Pariyanampatta Bhagavathy Temple
- Coordinates: 10.87940°N 76.40309°E

The Pariyanempatta Bhagavathi Temple is one of the famous temples of Kerala, India, dedicated to Bhagavathy. This is one of the largest Devi temples of Valluvanad Desam in Palghat district. The presiding deity is known as the Goddess of 14 Desams. The temple and its precincts resemble that of Mookambika temple Kollur.

== Important months ==
Pooram is the major festival celebrated in this temple. The festival is celebrated on the day when the moon rises with pooram star in the Malayalam month of Medam. ‘Moorthiyaatom’ on the eve of Pooram (Valiyaarattu) is the unique feature of this temple. Vela is before the star Pooram in the month of Makara. Pooram starts on 1st Kumbha with the hoisting of the temple flag. Vishuvilakku is celebrated on 1st of Medom. Laksharchana is performed permanently in the month of Karkitaka. Karthika Vilakku is celebrated in the month of Vrichika during the star Karthika, with various programmes

== In popular culture ==
The action packed climax scene of Malayalam movie Devasuram, starring Mohanlal, was entirely shot in this temple. It involves a terrible duel between mangalassery Neelakandan Mohanlal and Mundakkal SekharanNapoleon (actor).
