= Minnaminuginum Minnukettu =

- Poster
- Directed by: Thulasidas
- Written by: Thulasidas; A. K. Sajan (dialogues); A. K. Santhosh (dialogues)
- Screenplay by: A. K. Sajan; A. K. Santhosh
- Produced by: Mukesh R. Mehta
- Starring: Jayaram; Jagadish; Shobhana; Thilakan; Kaviyoor Ponnamma
- Cinematography: Utpal V. Nayanar
- Edited by: G. Murali
- Music by: S. P. Venkatesh Gireesh Puthanchery (lyrics)
- Production company: Soorya Cine Arts
- Distributed by: Soorya Cine Arts
- Release date: 25 April 1995
- Country: India
- Language: Malayalam

Minnaminuginum Minnukettu is a 1995 Indian Malayalam film, directed by Thulasidas and produced by Mukesh R. Mehta. The film stars Jayaram, Jagadish, Shobhana, Thilakan and Kaviyoor Ponnamma in the lead roles. The film has musical score by S. P. Venkatesh.

== Plot ==
Jayan is a happy-go-lucky type guy who leads comfortable life due to his wealthy father and lives along with his father, mother and sister. He is always accompanied by his friend Unni who doesn't have parents or relatives. But even though Jayan was a rebel type of guy, he always has kindness for the poor. Once such incident made him have a clash with Unnithan, a wealthy contractor. But later Jayan finds that Unnithan and his father were great friends and that incident turns the way for a marriage proposal with Unnithan's daughter Radhika. Even though Jayan initially was disinterested in the proposal, he finally agreed to see Unnithan's daughter. When Jayan saw Radhika, he was set in a motionless state and his hands were shaking when Radhika offered the tea cup to him. There was a flashback story between Jayan and Radhika during their college lives. Suresh Menon, who was then the roommate of Jayan was in love with Radhika. Jayan finally took his proposal only to see him getting insulted and finally slapped by Radhika in front of her friends. This made Jayan set a trap for her. The next day he and his friend went to her college and they said sorry in front of the whole college for what they have done. This cools Radhika and they became friends. During one of their meetings, Jayan asks for help from Radhika. Suresh and Lathika who was a friend to Radhika was about to get married. But their families didn't agree for that proposal. So Radhika could help them get married by signing as one of the witnesses during their marriage. Radhika agreed and she came to the office only to sign the bride's column of her marriage with Suresh, which was the trap made by Jayan. With his money, he overcame all the legal issues that came during that way as it was illegal way of marriage. This also did not calm Jayan. The next day he and his friend played the climax of their scripted cruel drama only to make Radhika realize that it was cunning plan set by Jayan. She was deeply insulted.

Jayan feared that this marriage proposal was a plan by Radhika to avenge for what he has done. Radhika assures Jayan that she has forgotten their past issues and genuinely wants to continue with this marriage as her father wishes it. Radhika wins Jayan's trust and the duo gets married. After marriage, Radhika confesses that she was tricking him into a marriage as she wants to avenge for his deeds. Radhika tortures him in all possible ways, but the couple hides it in front of their families. Jayan, though he wanted to get rid of Radhika, eventually realises that he had actually fallen for Radhika amidst their cat fights. When Jayan's childhood friend Pinky comes, Jayan's closeness with Pinky makes Radhika jealous. Forced by her aunt, Radhika lies that she is pregnant. This angers Jayan and he reveals the truth to their families. Eventually, Radhika leaves his house feeling guilty for hurting their families in the process of her revenge. Jayan declares that he is going to live with Pinky, which shocks everyone, and his family strongly protests. Jayan and Pinky decide to move on in their life and plan to shift to Mumbai. Unni informs this to Radhika. Before Jayan and Pinky leave to Mumbai, Radhika comes and apologises to everyone. Being a motherless child, she never had anyone to teach right and wrong in life, Radhika also confess that she has fallen for Jayan and because of which she will not stop him as she wanted him to be genuinely happy. Pinky reveals to everyone that all this was a drama played by Jayan, Unni and herself as they wanted Radhika to realise her love for Jayan. Even the tickets to Mumbai were in the names of Radhika and Jayan.

== Cast ==
- Jayaram as Jayan Menon
- Jagadish as Unni
- Shobhana as Radhika
- Heera Rajagopal as Pinky S. Menon
- Thilakan as M.K.Menon
- Kaviyoor Ponnamma as Jayan's Mother
- Chippy as Indira
- Sonia as Sathi
- Prem Kumar as Sub Inspector Pradeep
- Janardanan as Unnithan
- Oduvil Unnikrishnan menon families manager
- K. P. A. C. Lalitha as Subhadra
- Mahesh
- Thesni Khan
- Abu Salim (actor)

== Soundtrack ==
The music was composed by S. P. Venkatesh and the lyrics were written by Gireesh Puthenchery.

No.	Song	Singers	Lyrics	Raga	Length (m:ss)
1	"Kunungi Kunungi"	K. J. Yesudas, Chorus	Gireesh Puthenchery	Mohanam	
2	"Kunungikkunungi" (f)	Sujatha Mohan	Gireesh Puthenchery	Mohanam	
3	"Manjil Pootha"	M. G. Sreekumar, Swarnalatha	Gireesh Puthenchery	Mohanam	
4	"Thankathamburuvo"	S. Janaki	Gireesh Puthenchery		
