= Mappillai =

Mappillai may refer to:

- Maappillai (1952 film), an Indian Tamil-language drama directed by T. R. Raghunath
- Mappillai (1989 film), an Indian Tamil-language action comedy directed by Rajasekhar
- Mappillai (2011 film), an Indian Tamil-language action comedy directed by Suraj
- Mappillai (Vijay TV serial), a 2016 Indian Tamil-language soap opera
- Mappillai (ZEE Tamil TV serial), a dubbed version of the Hindi-language TV series Jamai Raja
- Coimbatore Mappillai, an Indian Tamil-language romantic comedy directed by C. Ranganathan

== See also ==
- Mappila (disambiguation)
