= Kerala House Udan Vilpanakku =

2004 film by Thaha

- Directed by: Thaha
- Screenplay by: Kaloor Dennis
- Story by: Girish Puthenchery
- Produced by: Ousepachan Vaalakuzhy
- Starring: Jayasurya; Harisree Asokan; Cochin Hanifa; Narendra Prasad
- Cinematography: R. Selva
- Edited by: P. C. Mohanan
- Music by: Ousepachan
- Production company: Chitrangana Films
- Distributed by: Chitrangana Release
- Release date: 6 February 2004
- Country: India
- Language: Malayalam

Kerala House Udan Vilpanakku (transl. Kerala House on immediate sale) is a 2004 Indian Malayalam-language comedy drama film directed by Thaha, starring Jayasurya, Harisree Asokan, Cochin Hanifa, and Narendra Prasad. The film deals with the problems faced by the protagonist in selling his property which is located in Kerala-Tamil Nadu border in Walayar. It was panned by the critics as well as the audience. This movie was actor Narendra Prasad's last film.

== Plot ==
The movie tells the story of Dineshan Kondody who tries to sell a house situated near the Kerala-Tamil Nadu border, only to liquidate his debts. The plan fails when he realizes that part of the property belongs to someone in Tamil Nadu.

== Cast ==
- Jayasurya as Dineshan Kondody (voiceover by Krishnachandran)
- Harisree Asokan as Vallabhan
- Cochin Hanifa as Vadival Vasu
- Rathi Arumugam as Sundari
- Thalaivasal Vijay as Periya Thevar
- Narendra Prasad as Paramu Nair
- Sridevika as Damayanti, Paramu Nair's daughter
- Salim Kumar as Tester Kannappan
- Geetha Salam as Ammavan
- Kovai Sarala as Parvathi Ammal
- Narayanankutty as snake charmer
- Sai Kumar as Mahendran Kondody
- Bala Singh as Chinna Thevar
- Manian Pillai Raju as Pisharadi
- Sadiq as Police Inspector Idiyan Thomas

== Production ==
Rathi made her Malayalam debut through this film.

== Reception ==
A critic from Sify wrote, "But sadly this film fails to evoke any laughter with some below the belt comedy and situations seen in a dozen comedy films in the past. By trying to create comedy situations the director losses grip on the story that goes haywire in between".
