= Madampi =

Madambi
- Directed by: B. Unnikrishnan
- Written by: B. Unnikrishnan
- Produced by: B. C. Joshi
- Starring: Mohanlal; Ajmal Ameer; Siddique; Kavya Madhavan; Mallika Kapoor
- Narrated by: Suresh Gopi
- Cinematography: Vijay Ulaganath
- Edited by: Manoj
- Music by: M. Jayachandran
- Production company: Surya Cinemas
- Distributed by: Vaisakha Release
- Release date: 4 July 2008
- Running time: 139 minutes
- Country: India
- Language: Malayalam
- Box office: ₹ 15.5 Crore

Madampi (transl. Feudal Lord) is a 2008 Indian Malayalam-language action drama film written and directed by B. Unnikrishnan. It stars Mohanlal, Ajmal Ameer, Siddique, Kavya Madhavan, and Mallika Kapoor. The film was released on 4 July 2008.

== Plot ==
Gopalakrishna Pillai is a ruthless loan shark and the wealthiest person in a village called Elavattam in Pathanamthitta district. People consider him to be cold and money-minded, without having any emotional bond even towards his mother, Devaki, or his younger brother Ramakrishnan.

As the story moves along, we learn more about the hero. He is considered heartless, as he threw out his father, Madhava Menon, when he was a teenager, for his father's wayward lifestyle. His mother hates him for doing that and his brother hates him as he does not let him pursue his dream of being an actor and never gives him any freedom. His main antagonists are Sreedharan and his younger brothers. Jayalakshmi is a bank manager, who is seen as a threat to Gopalakrishnan's money-lending business.

It turns out that Ramakrishnan is in love with a girl from Gopalakrishnan's rival family. Though, Gopalakrishnan arranges the marriage forgetting the rivalry, he asks his brother to repay him the expenses he incurred for the wedding and prompts the newlyweds to sleep separately. With this, he becomes the most hated person to his brother and mother. Frustrated, Ramakrishnan leaves the house and joins his in-laws against Gopalakrishnan by saying that his money-lending business is illegal.

Ramakrishnan accuses his brother of possessing and appropriating the family wealth exclusively for himself. He gives false information to the Income Tax Department and files a suit against him in court. In the climax, it is revealed by Gopalakrishnan's advocate that Gopalakrishnan has kept his hard-earned wealth in the name of his younger brother and was always hard on him just to make him responsible. It also is revealed that his father was not thrown out, but committed suicide in Madurai due to his debts. The story ends happily as the brothers reunite and everyone apologises to Gopalakrishnan.

== Cast ==
- Mohanlal as Puthanveetil Gopalakrishna Pillai
  - Ashwin as young Gopalakrishnan
- Kavya Madhavan as Jayalakshmi, Gopalakrishnan's childhood friend
  - Swathi Sunil Kumar as young Jayalakshmi
- Ajmal Ameer as Puthanveetil Ramakrishna Pillai, Gopalakrishnan's younger brother
  - Adwaith Shaji as young Ramakrishnan
  - Harimurali as younger Ramakrishnan
- Mallika Kapoor as Shyamala, Ramakrishnan's wife
- Siddique as Kottilakathu Sreedharan, Shyamala's elder brother
- Saikumar as Madhava Menon, Gopalakrishnan's and Ramakrishnan's father
- Jagathy Sreekumar as advocate Mohan Kumar, Gopalakrishnan's friend
- Innocent as Karayogam President Divakaran, Gopalakrishnan's family friend
- Suraj Venjaramoodu as Keedam Vasu
- K. P. A. C. Lalitha as Puthanveetil Devakiyamma, Gopalakrishnan's and Ramakrishnam's mother
- Vijayakumar as Kottilakathu Aravindan, Sreedharan's younger brother
- Kiran Raj as Kottilakathu Raghu, Sreedharan's youngest brother
- V. K. Sreeraman as Kottilakathu Parameswaran Kurup, Sreedharan, Aravindan, Raghu and Shyamala's father
- M. R. Gopakumar as Kottilakathu Raghavan, Parameswaran's younger brother
- Kozhikode Narayanan Nair as Saghavu Kumaran, Gopalakrishnan's family friend
- Madhu as Justice Sukumara Kurup (cameo)
- Biju Pappan as SI Vincent, Sreedharan's ally
- Deepika Mohan as Raghavan's wife
- Lakshmipriya as Lakshmi, Mohan Kumar's wife
- Krishna Praba as Bhavani
- Sivaji Guruvayoor as Keshavan, Jayalakshmi's father
- Tony Sigimon as Appu, Mohan Kumar's son

== Production ==
The filming was completed on 4 June 2008 in Ottapalam. Mohanlal had 47 days of shoot.

== Soundtrack ==
Madampi

Soundtrack album by M. Jayachandran
- Released: 20 June 2008
- Genre: Feature film soundtrack
- Length: 21:40
- Label: Satyam Audios
- Producer: B. C. Joshi

M. Jayachandran chronology
Anthiponvettam	Madampi	Parthan Kanda Paralokam

The film has four songs composed by M. Jayachandran. The lyrics are by Gireesh Puthenchery and Anil Panachooran (Jeevitham Oru). The songs "Amma Mazhakarinu" and "Kalyanakacheri" were chartbusters.

Track	Song	Singer(s)	Duration	Other notes
1	"Amma Mazhakkarinu"	Dr. K. J. Yesudas	4.03	Raga: Navakouns; Kerala State Film Award for Best Music Director; Filmfare Award for Best Singer; Filmfare Award for Best Lyricist
2	"Kalyanakacheri"	Shankar Mahadevan	4.27	Raga: Bilahari; Kerala State Film Award for Best Music Director; Kerala State Film Award for Best Singer
3	"Ente Sharike"	Sudeep Kumar, Roopa Revathi	4.30	
4	"Jeevitham Oru"	Mohanlal	1.07	
5	"Amma Mazhakkarinu"	Shweta Mohan	4.03	Raga: Navakouns
6	"Ente Sharike"	Sudeep Kumar	4.30	

== Box office ==
The film collected ₹1.37 crore from 61 screens in its first weekend (3 days) from Kerala. It was made on a budget of ₹ 3.5 crores. The film got ₹ 1 crore 90 lakhs as distribution share, ₹ 1 crore 8 lakhs as satellite and video rights, ₹ 9 lakhs as audio rights, and ₹ 25 lakhs as overseas right. It got a gross collection of ₹ 7.5 crores within 30 days. The film collected ₹100 million in total. The movie ran for more than 100 days in major centres. Madampi became one of the highest-grossing Malayalam films of the year.

== Awards ==
Kerala State Film Awards

- M. Jayachandran – Best Music Director ("Kalyana kacheri", "Amma Mazhakkarinu" & "Ente Sharike")
- Shankar Mahadevan – Best Male Playback Singer (Kalyanakacheri)

Filmfare Awards South

- Dr. K. J. Yesudas – Best Male Playback Singer (Amma Mazhakkarinu)
- Gireesh Puthenchery – Best Lyricist (Amma Mazhakkarinu)

Asianet Film Award

- Best Actor – Mohanlal

Vanitha Film Awards

- Best Actor – Mohanlal

AMMA (Dubai) Award

- Best Actor – Mohanlal

== See also ==
- Madampi – aristocratic title equivalent to "lord" in English
