= Mappila =

Mappila may refer to:

- Nasrani Mappila, or Saint Thomas Christians, a Christian community in Kerala
- Muslim Mappila, or Malabar Muslims, a Muslim community in Kerala
- Juda Mappila, or Cochin Jews, a Jewish community in Kerala
- Mappila Malayalam, an alternative term of Arabi Malayalam, the traditional Dravidian language of the Mappila Muslim community
- Moplah (sword), a type of large knife formerly carried by the male members of the Muslim Mappila community
- Mappila songs or Mappila pattu, songs of the Mappila Muslims

== See also ==
- Mappillai (disambiguation)
- Moplah rebellion or Malabar rebellion, revolt against British rule in India in 1921–1922
