= Ravanaprabhu =

2001 film directed by Ranjith

- 100 days success poster
- Directed by: Ranjith
- Written by: Ranjith
- Produced by: Antony Perumbavoor
- Starring: Mohanlal; Vasundhara Das; Napoleon; Siddique; Innocent; Vijayaraghavan; Sai Kumar
- Cinematography: P. Sukumar
- Edited by: Ranjan Abraham
- Music by: Music: Suresh Peters; Score: C. Rajamani
- Production company: Aashirvad Cinemas
- Distributed by: Swargachithra
- Release date: 31 August 2001
- Running time: 178 minutes
- Country: India
- Language: Malayalam
- Box office: ₹19.70 crore

Ravanaprabhu (transl. Lord Ravana) is a 2001 Indian Malayalam-language action drama film written and directed by Ranjith in his directorial debut. It is a sequel to the 1993 film Devaasuram written by Ranjith and directed by I.V. Sasi. The film stars Mohanlal in dual roles of Mangalassery Neelakandan and M. N. Karthikeyan, father and son. Napoleon reprises the role of Neelakandan's archenemy Mundackal Shekharan. It also features Vasundhara Das, Siddique, Innocent, Vijayaraghavan, and Sai Kumar. Revathi reprises the role of Bhanumathi in a cameo appearance. The plot follows M. N. Karthikeyan, Neelakandan's son and his attempts to reclaim their ancestral home Mangalassery tharavadu. The film features original songs composed by Suresh Peters and background score by C. Rajamani.

Ravanaprabhu was released on 31 August 2001 and received generally positive reviews from critics and was a commercial success, grossing over ₹15 crores during its theatrical run, making it the highest-grossing Malayalam movie of 2001. Among its various accolades, Ravanaprabhu won the Kerala State Film Awards for Best Film with Popular Appeal and Aesthetic Value and Best Male Playback Singer for K. J. Yesudas.

== Plot ==
The story is set after 30 years of the incidents in Devasuram.

The story begins with Mangalassery Neelakandan's ('Neelan') son Karthikeyan, as he ventures out to make money - ultimately becoming a wealthy businessman and a liquor baron, while Neelakandan - with the passage of time - is burdened by liabilities and is in dire financial position. The relationship between Neelan and Karthikeyan becomes strained, as Neelan disapproves of his son's money-making methods.

Mundakkal Shekaran Nambiar - now an established industrialist and the owner of a multispeciality hospital - was imprisoned in the past for killing one of Neelan's friends, Kunjananthan, decades ago on Neelan's and Bhanumathi's wedding day. He still carries a grudge against Neelan for severing the former's right-hand years ago. Shekaran decides to ruin the Mangalassery family by taking over the chairmanship of a debt-ridden bank to confiscate the Mangalassery ancestral house (Tharavadu) which is mortgaged to the bank for the educational expenses of Suhara, daughter of one of Neelan's aides, Hydrose.

Bhanumathi seeks treatment at Shekaran's hospital. Even though Dr. Janaki, Shekaran's daughter, offers her the treatment she requires, Shekaran denies her treatment and asks her aides to leave the hospital, but Neelan arrives on time and berates Shekaran. Neelan tries to have her treatee elsewhere, but Bhanumathi passes away in her sleep. Neelan is shattered. Karthikeyan is unable to arrive on time to set fire to his mother's funeral pyre - Neelan performs the funeral rituals of Bhanumathi - and is now bent on taking revenge on Shekaran. He vandalises the hospital as revenge.

Neelan loses his home - as Shekaran, his nephew Rajendran and the board of directors of the Bank decide to attach the Mangalassery House - and Karthikeyan ventures out in an attempt to reclaim the ancestral home – where Bhanumathi was cremated and the urn of her ashes stands on the Mangalassery soil. He tries to acquire the house legally from an auction with the assistance of the state's Home Minister and MLA Sivadasan (Kunjananthan's son and Karthikeyan's childhood friend), but Shekaran and the cunning Rajendran, along with the latter's evil accomplice Maniyampra Purushothaman, acquire it back using a faux concealed tender. As a last resort, Karthikeyan seizes Purushothaman's S Class Mercedes-Benz car and also abducts Janaki in an attempt to blackmail Shekaran, and hides her at the house of his friend, Sakhtivel Gounder, in Pollachi. It is during this time that Karthikeyan and Janaki fall in love with each other.

Karthikeyan gets the Mangalassery Tharavadu back when Shekaran strikes a compromise without the knowledge of Rajendran and Janaki's fiancé, Sreenivasan Nambiar IPS. Janaki is subsequently released. As a result of arguments with Sreenivasan about her chastity while being in the custody of Karthikeyan, and her not giving a written statement to the police against him because of her liking towards Karthikeyan, their wedding is called off by Janaki.

Rajendran makes a last attempt to kill Karthikeyan, but instead kills Neelan by lighting him on fire. Rajendran in turn is killed by Neelan after a perfect knife throw, piercing through his throat. Karthikeyan, now infuriated due to his father's murder, goes on to kill Shekaran by burning him. But an elderly Warrier stops him and brings him back. Shekaran realises his mistakes, as well as the influence of the kind Warrier on both Neelan and Karthikeyan (Warrier's intervention prevented Neelan from killing Shekaran decades ago: in Devasuram).

In the end, the urns of Bhanumathi and Neelan are shown; Karthikeyan becomes the head of the Mangalassery house, and Sreenivasan parts ways with Janaki on a happy note. Karthikeyan and Janaki are happily married with everyone's blessings.

== Cast ==
- Mohanlal in dual roles as:
  - Mangalassery Neelakandan "Neelan"
  - Mangalassery Neelakandan (M. N.) Karthikeyan "Karthi", Neelan's son
    - Vishnu Sasikumar as Young Karthikeyan
- Napoleon as Mundakkal Shekharan Nambiar
- Vasundhara Das as Janaki Nambiar, Shekharan's daughter and Karthi's love interest
  - Sanusha as Young Janaki
- Siddique as SP Sreenivasan Nambiar IPS, Janaki's ex fiance and later becomes Karthikeyan's friend in the end
- Vijayaraghavan as Mundakkal Rajendran Nambiar, Shekharan's nephew
- Saikumar as Unni, Karthi's friend and business partner
- Manoj K. Jayan as MLA Sivadasan, Kunjananthan's son and Karthi's childhood friend
- Innocent as Warrier, caretaker of the Mangalassery house and Neelan's confidant
- Augustine as Hydrose, Neelan's friend
- V. K. Sreeraman as Kuruppu, Neelan's friend
- Jagathy Sreekumar as Sakthivel Gounder
- Jagadish as Guruswami, Gounder's assistant
- N. F. Varghese as Paul, Karthikeyan's close associate
- Ratheesh as Maniyampra Purushothaman (MP), Rajendran's partner friend
- P.J.Radhakrishnan as Minister Madhavan
- Rajashree as Dr. Suhra Hydrose, Hydrose's daughter
- Fathima Babu as Sreedevi, Shekaran's wife and Janaki's mother
- Nadirsha as Salaam Hydrose, Suhra's younger brother and Hydrose's son
- T. P. Madhavan as Chandran Nambiar, Sreenivasan's father
- Sukumari as Gounder's mother
- Baburaj as Nateshan, Rajendran's henchman
- Nalini as Gounder's wife
- Manju Pillai as Kumudam, Gounder's younger sister
- Abu Salim as Vikraman, goon
- Besant Ravi as goon
- Joju George as Police officer (uncredited)
- Madhupal as Harinarayanan, Peringodu Sankara Marar's son (cameo appearance)
- Revathi as Bhanumathi (Bhanu), Neelan's wife and Karthi's mother (cameo appearance)
- Janardhanan as Mundakkal Kunjikrishnan Nambiar (photo archive)
- Ramu as Kunjananthan, MLA Sivadasan's late father (cameo appearance)
- Vindhya as Item girl in song "Pottukuthedi"
- Kashmera Shah as Item girl in song "Thakilu Pukilu"

=== Family Tree ===
† Indicates a deceased character.

Mangalassery Family
Mundakkal Family

Mundakkal Ramakrishnan Nambiar †
Mangalassery Madhava Menon †	Yasodha †	Unknown	Mampatta Appukutty Nair †	Madhavi †	Parameswaran †	Bhargavi Nambiar †	Kunjikrishnan Nambiar †
Mangalassery Neelakandan †	Bhanumathi †	Sarada †	Achuthan	Mundakkal Shekharan Nambiar	Sreedevi	Lakshmi Nambiar	Krishnan †
Karthikeyan	Janaki Nambiar	Rajendran Nambiar†

== Production ==
Ravanaprabhu marks the directorial debut of Ranjith and acts as a sequel to the 1993 film Devaasuram written by Ranjith. The plot follows M. N. Karthikeyan, a new character, the son of Mangalasserry Neelakandan. Vasundhara Das played the female lead role, who debuted in Malayalam with the film. She started by filming the song "Pottukuthedi" which was shot in five days. Kanal Kannan was the action choreographer of the film. The Karthikeyan vs. SP Sreenivasan fight scene featuring Mohanlal and Siddique was choreographed by Kanal Kannan, who then worked in the film. Ravanaprabhu marks the debut work of Hein in Malayalam cinema.

== Soundtrack ==
Ravanaprabhu

Soundtrack album by Suresh Peters
- Released: 2001
- Recorded: 2001
- Genre: soundtrack
- Length: 31:05
- Label: East Coast Audio
- Producer: Antony Perumbavoor

Suresh Peters chronology
Thenkasipattanam (2000)	Ravanaprabhu (2001)	Hanuman Junction (2001)

The film's soundtrack includes five songs composed by Suresh Peters and written by Gireesh Puthenchery. "Vandemukunda Hare" was song taken from the prequel Devaasuram originally sung and composed by M. G. Radhakrishnan. The soundtrack album was released by the label East Coast Audio Entertainments. The film's background score was composed by C. Rajamani.

Ravanaprabhu
No.	Title	Singer(s)	Length
1.	"Ariyathe Ariyathe"	P. Jayachandran, K. S. Chithra	5:32
2.	"Pottukuthedi"	Palakkad Sreeram, Swarnalatha	4:29
3.	"Aakashadheepangal Sakshi"	K. J. Yesudas	4:07
4.	"Aattoram Azhakoram"	Sujatha Mohan	4:46
5.	"Aakashadheepangal Sakshi"	K. S. Chithra	4:07
6.	"Vande Mukundahare"	Nikhil	2:08
7.	"Ariyathe Ariyathe"	K. S. Chithra	5:32
8.	"Thakilu Pukilu"	M. G. Sreekumar, Radhika Thilak, Prabhakaran, Mohanlal	5:42

== Release ==
Ravanaprabhu was released as an Onam festival release on 31 August 2001. A digitally remastered 4K Dolby Atmos version of Ravanaprabhu was released theatrically on 10 October 2025, having a special premiere on 9 October 2025 at Kavitha theatre, Ernakulam.

== Reception ==
Ravanaprabhu received generally positive reviews from critics and was a commercial success at box office. The film grossed over ₹15 crores during its initial theatrical run, making it the highest-grossing Malayalam movie of 2001. Mohanlal's frequently used punchline Savari Giri Giri became a popular catchphrase. In re-release the film has collected ₹70 lakhs in day one, ₹1.42 crores in 2 days and ₹2.30 in 3 days.

== Accolades ==
Kerala State Film Awards

- Best Film with Popular Appeal and Aesthetic Value
- Best Male Playback Singer – K. J. Yesudas

Kerala Film Critics Association Awards

- Best Popular Film – Ranjith (director)
- Best Choreographer – Kumar-Shanthi

Filmfare Awards South

- Best Music Director (Malayalam) – Suresh Peters

Asianet Film Awards

- Best Male Playback Singer – P. Jayachandran
- Best Supporting Actor – Innocent
- Best Makeup Artist – P. V. Shankar, Salim
