= Girish Puthenchery =

Indian lyricist and poet

- Born: 1 May 1961; Puthenchery, Ulliyeri, Kozhikode District, Kerala, India
- Died: 10 February 2010 (aged 48); Kozhikode, Kerala, India
- Resting place: Kozhikode
- Education: Government College, Meenchantha
- Occupations: Lyricist; Poet; Author; Scriptwriter; Composer
- Years active: 1989–2010
- Works: Filmography
- Children: 2, including Jitin Puthenchery
- Awards: Kerala State Film Award; Asianet Film Award; Kerala Film Critics Association Award; Filmfare Award; Mathrubhumi Literary Award; Vanitha Film Award; Film Arts Club Cochin Award; Medimix Award; Travancore Club Award

Girish Puthenchery (1961–2010) was a noted Malayalam lyricist, poet, scriptwriter and screenwriter, he was often regarded as the aristocratic lyricist of Malayalam and admired for his original and unmistakable writing style. He also served as the director of Indian Performance Rights Society and was a member of the governing councils of Kerala Kalamandalam and Kerala Lalithakala Academy.Girish made his debut in the film industry with the movie Enquiry in 1989. He went on to win the Kerala State Film Award for Best Lyricist seven times. Notably, he holds the record for writing the highest number of songs in the Malayalam film industry within the briefest period of time. He died on 10 February 2010 at a private hospital in Kozhikode Due to a severe brain hemorrhage.

== Life and career ==
=== Personal life ===
Girish was born to Pulikkool Krishna Panicker and Meenakshi Amma in Puthenchery, near Ulliyeri village in the Kozhikode district of Kerala.His father was an astrologer and Ayurvedic practitioner, while his mother was a Carnatic musician. Under his mother's guidance, Girish learned the basics of music, and from his father, he gained knowledge of Sanskrit and malayalam. He received his primary education at GLP School Puthenchery, AUP School Modakkallur, and Palora Higher secondary school in Ulliyeri. He later pursued a degree in literature at the Government Arts and Science College, Meenchantha.

From a very young age, Girish developed a strong affinity for the Malayalam language and literature. At the age of 14, his first poem, titled Mochanam was published in a weekly magazine.He became a prominent figure in the Chenthara Arts Club (a cultural club based in Puthenchery), where he wrote and directed numerous dramas and songs in collaboration with his brother, Mohanan and other local artists.

Initially, Girish aspired to become a singer, idolizing K. J. Yesudas.However, following the unexpected death of his father which left the family in financial hardship he abandoned this dream and turned his focus to songwriting. determined to succeed, Girish redoubled his efforts to establish himself as a lyricist.

Before breaking into the world of songwriting, he worked as a copywriter for several scriptwriters, valued for his exceptional handwriting. These industry connections proved instrumental in helping him showcase his lyrics, ultimately paving the way for his success as a renowned lyricist.

In 1988, Girish was married to Beena, and they have two children, Jithin and Dinnath.His elder son, Jithin, has made a name for himself in acting, while his younger son, Din Nath, works behind the scenes as an assistant director and lyricist, writing songs for Malayalam films.

Before entering the Malayalam film industry, Girish worked as a collection agent at the Kozhikode RTO office and as a copywriter at All India Radio, Kozhikode. During this time, he continued to write songs and Lalitha Ganams for popular cassette recording companies, including Akashvani, HMV, Magnasounds, and Tharangini. He also penned many hit songs for Doordarshan and Asianet.

=== Film career ===
In 1989, Malayalam film director Vijayan Karote introduced Girish to the Malayalam film industry. Girish wrote the lyrics and screenplay for Karote's movie Bhramarakashassu, but due to unforeseen circumstances, the film's initial release was delayed. During the same year, Girish was given the opportunity to write songs for another film, Enquiry, directed by U.V. Raveendranath with Rajamani as the music composer. Through this film, Girish's debut song, "Janmantharangalil," was released. However, the song did not gain significant popularity.

Later, director Ranjith enlisted Girish to write the screenplay for the film Georgootty C/O Georgootty, which marked Girish's transition into lyrics writing. Ranjith's recommendation led to Girish's opportunity to write songs for director Jayaraj's movie Johnnie Walker, which became a breakthrough for him. The track "Shanthamee Rathriyil" from the film became iconic and earned Girish critical acclaim, solidifying his place in the Malayalam film industry. He is also one of the most honored lyricists, having won the Kerala State Award for Best Lyricist seven times.

=== Other works ===
In addition to writing lyrics, Girish has written screenplays for several films, including Brahmarakshassu, Pallavur Devanarayanan, Vadakkumnadhan, Kinnaripuzhayoram, and the story for Meleparambil Aanveedu, Adivaram, Ikkareyanente Manasam, Oro Viliyum Kathorthu, and Kerala House Udan Vilpanakku. Girish has also published two poetry collections and composed music for a devotional album. Additionally, he was scripting a film titled Raman Police, in which Mohanlal was expected to play the lead role.

== Filmography ==
This article highlights the work he has done.

== Death ==
Girish was a chronic diabetic and hypertensive patient. He was admitted to MIMS Hospital near his home on 6 February 2010 after suffering a massive stroke. At the time, he was writing a eulogy for the popular actor and director Cochin Haneefa, who had died four days earlier. Girish slipped into a coma soon after arriving at the hospital. He underwent two surgeries, but his condition did not improve, and he suffered a brain hemorrhage, dying at the hospital on 10 February 2010, at the age of 48. He was cremated with full state honors at the Mavoor Road crematorium the following day.

== Awards ==
Kerala State Film Award for Best Lyricist
No	Year	Movie	Song	Composer
1	1995	Agnidevan	Oru Poovithalin	M.G Radhakrishnan
2	1997	Krishnagudiyil Oru Pranayakalathu	Pinneyum Pinneyuym	Vidyasagar
3	1999	Punaradhivasam	Kanaka Munthirikal	Louis Banks
4	2001	Ravanaprabhu	Aakasha Deepangal Sakshi	Suresh Peters
5	2002	Nandanam	Karmukil Varnante Chundil	Raveendran
6	2003	Gourisankaram	Urangathe Raavurangi	M.Jayachandran
7	2004	Kathavasheshan	Kannu Nattu Kaathirunnittum	M.Jayachandran

Asianet Film Awards
No	Year	Movie	Song	Composer
1	2004	Maampazhakkaalam	Kandu Kandu Kothi	M.Jayachandran
2	2006	Vadakkumnadhan	Kalabham Tharam	Raveendran
3	2008	Madambi	Amma Mazhakarinu	M.Jayachandran

Filmfare Award
No	Year	Movie	Song	Composer
1	2006	Vadakkumnadhan	Kalabham Tharam	Raveendran
2	2008	Madambi	Amma Mazhakarinu	M.Jayachandran
