= List of Malayalam films of 1996 =

The following is a list of Malayalam films released in the year 1996.

Opening		Film	Cast	Director	Music director	Notes
J A N	12	Lalanam	Sukumari, Jagathy Sreekumar	Chandrasekharan	S. P. Venkatesh	
J A N	18	Kudumbakodathi	Innocent, Dileep, Mohini, Ashokan	Viji Thampy	S. P. Venkatesh	
F E B	2	Sathyabhamakkoru Premalekhanam	Biju Menon, Prem Kumar	Rajasenan	Rajamani	
F E B	9	Azhakiya Ravanan	Mammootty, Bhanupriya	Kamal	Vidyasagar	
F E B	21	Vanarasena	Jagathy Sreekumar, Baiju	Jayan Varkala	Berny-Ignatius	
F E B	23	Kaathil Oru Kinnaram	Jagathy Sreekumar, Thilakan	Mohan Kupleri	S. P. Venkatesh	
M A R	1	Malayaalamaasam Chingam Onninu	Dileep, Prem Kumar, Biju Menon, Rudra	Nissar	Raveendran	
M A R	1	Kanjirappally Kariachan	Vijayaraghavan, Janardanan, Maathu	Jose Thomas		
M A R	29	Sallapam	Dileep, Manoj K. Jayan, Manju Warrier	Sundar Das	Johnson	
A P R	6	Kaalapani	Mohanlal, Prabhu, Tabu	Priyadarshan	Ilaiyaraaja	
A P R	6	Devaraagam	Sridevi, Aravind Swamy	Bharathan	M. M. Keeravani	
A P R	11	Swapna Lokathe Balabhaskaran	Jayaram, Dileep, Annie	Rajasenan	S.P. Venkatesh	
A P R	14	Hitler	Mammootty, Mukesh, Shobana, Vani Vishwanath	Siddique	S. P. Venkatesh	
M A Y	9	Hitlist	Rahman, Ratheesh	Sasi Mohan		
M A Y	10	Kazhakam	Urvashi, Nedumudi Venu	MP Sukumaran Nair	Jerry Amaldev	
M A Y	11	King Soloman	Rahman, Sheeba, Farheen	Balu Kiriyath		
M A Y	12	Silayugathile Sthreekal		RS Suresh		
M A Y	15	Aayiram Naavulla Ananthan	Mammootty, Murali, Gautami, Madhavi	Thulasidas	Johnson	
M A Y	17	Kinnam Katta Kallan	Sreenivasan, Jagadish, Jagathy Sreekumar	KK Haridas		
M A Y	24	Sulthan Hyderali	Vijayaraghavan, Anusha	Balu Kiriyath		
J U N	14	Harbour	Vijayaraghavan, Chippy, Thilakan	Anil-Babu		
J U N	14	Kireedamillatha Rajakkanmar	Jagadish, Prem Kumar, Annie	Kalabhavan Ansar		
J U N	?	Moonilonnu	Ramachandran, Ashokan	Dr.Haridas		
J U L	5	Mr. Clean	Mukesh, Sreenivasan, Annie	Vijayakrishnan		
J U L	12	Aakaashathekkoru Kilivaathil	Ratheesh, Geetha, Anju Aravind	Arun		
J U L	19	Sukhavasam	M.G. Soman, Kuthiravattam Pappu	PK Radhakrishnan		
J U L	19	K. L. 7/95 Ernakulam North	Shammi Thilakan, Anusha	Paulson		
J U L	19	Mayooranritham	Mohini, Kumarakam Raghunath, Vikram	Vijayakrishnan	G. Devarajan	
J U L	26	Kanchanam	Manoj K Jayan, Thilakan, Srividya	TN Vasanth Kumar		
A U G	2	Sammohanam	Murali, Archana, Nedumudi Venu	C. P. Padmakumar	Ilaiyaraaja	
A U G	2	Pallivaathukkal Thommichan	Manoj K Jayan, Anusha, Silk Smitha	Sandhya Mohan		
A U G	15	Yuvathurki	Suresh Gopi, Vijayashanti	Bhadran	S.P. Venkatesh	
A U G	23	The Prince	Mohanlal, Prema, Prakash Raj	Suresh Krissna	Deva	
A U G	23	Indraprastham	Mammootty, Vikram, Simran	Haridas	Deva	
A U G	23	Thooval Kottaram	Jayaram, Sukanya, Manju Warrier	Sathyan Anthikad	Johnson	
A U G	27	April 19	Balachandra Menon, Nandhini	Balachandra Menon	Raveendran	
A U G	27	Dilliwala Rajakumaran	Jayaram, Manju Warrier, Kalabhavan Mani, Biju Menon	Rajasenan	Ouseppachan	
S E P	20	Aramana Veedum Anjoorekkarum	Jayaram, Shobhana, Jagathy Sreekumar	Anil-Babu	Rajamani	
S E P	27	Manthrika Kuthira	Manoj K. Jayan, Dileep, Vani Viswanath	Viji Thampi	Tomin J Thachankary	
O C T	4	Dominic Presentation	Ashokan, Geetha, Vijayakumar	Ramesh Das		
O C T	12	Padanayakan	Vijayaraghavan, Dileep, Meera, Chippy	Nissar	Rajamani	
O C T	18	Kaanaakkinaavu	Mukesh, Murali, Sukanya	Sibi Malayil	Raghu Kumar	
O C T	18	Kalyana Sougandhikam	Dileep, Divya Unni, Jagadhish	Vinayan	Johnson	
O C T	18	Desadanam	Vijayaraghavan, Master Kumar, Mini Nair	Jayaraaj	Kaithapram	
O C T	19	Ishtamanu Nooru Vattam	Shiju, Sonia Kapoor, Reshmi Soman	Sidhique Shameer		
O C T	25	Rajaputhran	Suresh Gopi, Vikram, Shobana	Shajoon Kariyal	M. Jayachandran	
N O V	1	Swarna Kireedam	Manoj K Jayan, Kalabhavan Mani, Vani Viswanath	V. M. Vinu	S. P. Venkatesh	
N O V	1	Man of the Match	Biju Menon, Shiju, Vani Viswanath	Joshy Mathew	Ilaiyaraaja	
N O V	21	Kumkumacheppu	Manoj K Jayan, Shobhana, Priya Raman	Thulasidas	S. P. Venkatesh	
N O V	22	Mahathma	Suresh Gopi, Biju Menon, Ramya Krishnan	Shaji Kailas	Vidyasagar	
N O V	22	Madamma	Sreenivasan, Archana	Sarjoolan	Ouseppachan	
N O V	29	Mookkilla Rajyathu Murimookkan Rajavu	Manoj K Jayan, Annie	Sasi Mohan		
N O V	29	Kathapurushan	Vishwanathan, Mini Nair	Adoor Gopalakrishnan	Vijaya Bhaskar	
N O V	29	Excuse Me Ethu Collegila	Prem Kumar, Kalabhavan Mani, Anusha	Mohan Roop	Mohan Sithara	
D E C	5	Naalamkettile Nalla Thampimar	Vijayaraghavan, Kalabhavan Mani, Anusha, Priya Raman	Sree Prakash		
D E C	19	Kaliveedu	Jayaram, Manju Warrier, Vani Viswanath	Sibi Malayil	Mohan Sitara	
D E C	20	Ee Puzhayum Kadannu	Dileep, Manju Warrier, Mohini	Kamal	Johnson	
D E C	21	Udhyanapalakan	Mammootty, Kaveri	Hari Kumar	Johnson	
D E C	25	Saamoohyapaadam	Dileep, Kalabhavan Mani, Prem Kumar	Kareem	S. P. Venkatesh	
D E C	25	Mimics Super 1000	Jagadish, Anusha, Sainudeen	Balu Kiriyath		
D E C	25	Nandagopaalante Kusruthikal	Mukesh, Chembakam	Nissar		
		Laavanya Lahari				
		Veruthe Nuna Parayaruthu				
		Ammuvinte Aangalamar				
		Sourayoodham				
		Soorya Puthrikal				

== Dubbed films ==
The following is a list of Malayalam films (dubbed from other languages) released in the year 1996.

Month	Release date	No.	Title	Director	Original title		Cast	Music director	Ref
Month	Release date	No.	Title	Director	Film	Language	Cast	Music director	Ref
J A N	4	1	Super Hero S. P. Parasuram	Ravi Raja Pinisetty	S. P. Parasuram	Telugu	Chiranjeevi, Sridevi, Harish Kumar	M. M. Keeravani	
J A N	19	2	Dravidam	Bhanu Chander	Deshadrohalu	Telugu	Bhanu Chander, Shweta Menon	Bhanu Chander	
F E B	16	3	Aye Madam	A. Kodandarami Reddy	Allari Alludu	Telugu	Nagarjuna, Meena, Nagma	M. M. Keeravani	
M A R	15	4	Super Action	A. Kodandarami Reddy	Trinetrudu	Telugu	Chiranjeevi, Bhanupriya, Nagendra Babu	Raj–Koti	
M A R	?	5	Time Bomb	Joe Simon	Time Bomb	Kannada	Vishnuvardhan, Tiger Prabhakar, Devaraj	Hamsalekha	
A U G	9	6	Sooryaputhrikal	V. S. Narasimhan	Paasamalargal	Tamil	Revathi, Arvind Swamy, Ajith Kumar	Suresh Chandra Menon	
