= Saranya Anand =

Indian actress

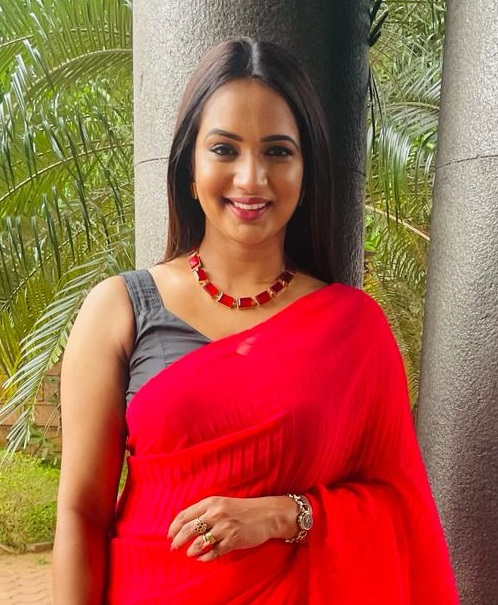
- Born: Surat, Gujarat, India
- Occupation(s): Actress, model
- Years active: 2016–present
- Spouse: Manesh Rajan Nair

Saranya Anand is an Indian actress who works in Malayalam cinema and television. She appeared as Vedikha in the Asianet drama series Kudumbavilakku. She also appeared in the films Chunkzz, Garudan and "Mamangam". She participated in the dance competition Dancing Stars on Asianet.

== Early life and education ==
Saranya Anand was born in Surat, Gujarat, India, the daughter of Anandan R. and Sujatha Anand. She grew up in Gujarat, where she completed her formative education. Later, she pursued her higher education at Bhagwan Mahavir University. Saranya has a younger sister named Divyadarshana Anand.

== Career ==
Saranya Anand began her career in 2016, initially in modeling before transitioning into television and cinema. She has made over 50 appearances in various television shows and series such as "Dare the Fear", "Dancing Stars" and "Comedy Stars". Additionally, she was featured on the cover page of Vanitha magazine, Mangalam, and Mathrubhumi, and currently participating in Big Boss Malayalam Television Reality Show Season 6 on Asianet

Saranya Anand appeared in the serial "Kudumbavilakku" in 2020, for which she was awarded the Asianet Television Awards for Best Performance in a Negative Role in 2022. In 2022 she also received the State Award for Best Actress by Ramu Kariat.

In Malayalam cinema, Anand has played roles in "Chunkzz" (2017), "1971 Beyond Borders" (2017), "Aakashamittayee" (2017), "Achayans" (2017), "Cappuccino" (2017), "Garudan" (2023), "Laughing Apartment Near Girinagar" (2018), "Mamangam" (2019), "A for Apple" (2019), "Chanakyatanthram" (2018), and "Thanaha" (2018). She has also appeared in the Tamil film "Vyuham" in 2024, and in the Telugu film "Premalo Mari" in 2015.

== Filmography ==
Year	Film	Director	Role	Language
2015	Paddanandi Premalo Mari	Mahesh Upputuri	Nayana	Telugu
2017	1971: Beyond Borders	Major Ravi	Military Nurse	Malayalam
2017	Chunkzz	Omar Lulu	Soni Miss	Malayalam
2017	Aakashamittayee	Samuthirakani, M. Padmakumar	Amrita Sister	Malayalam
2017	Achayans	Kannan Thamarakkulam	Maya	Malayalam
2017	Cappuccino	Noushad	Reshma	Malayalam
2018	Chanakya Thanthram	Kannan Thamarakulam	Sub Inspector Meera	Malayalam
2018	Thanaha	Prakash Kunjhan Moorayil	IPS Pouly Philip	Malayalam
2018	Laughing Apartment Near Girinagar	Nissar	Riya	Malayalam
2019	Mamangam	M. Padmakumar	Woman in Brothel	Malayalam
2019	Aakasha Ganga 2	Vinayan	Burnt Ganga (spirit) Collage teacher	Malayalam
2019	A for Apple	B. Madhu, S. Kumar	Ammu	Malayalam
2023	Garudan	Arun Varma	Smitha Jijo	Malayalam

== Television ==
Year	Show	Role	Language	Channel	Notes
2017	Dare The Fear	Contestant	Malayalam	Asianet	Reality Show
2020 - 2023	Kudumbavilakku	Vedika	Malayalam	Asianet	Asianet Television Awards for Best Performance in a Negative Role in 2022
2022-2023	Comedy Stars	Guest	Malayalam	Asianet	Reality show
2022-2023	Dancing Stars	Contestant	Malayalam	Asianet	Reality show
2024	Bigg Boss (Malayalam season 6)	Contestant	Malayalam	Asianet	Reality show
2025	Enkile Ennodu Para	Contestant	Malayalam	Asianet	Reality show

== Music video ==
Year	Title	Role	Language	Notes
2024	Priyathama	Actor and Producer	Malayalam	
