= Newspaper Boy (1997 film) =

- Directed by: Nissar
- Starring: Mukesh; Jagathy Sreekumar; Suma
- Cinematography: M.D. Sukumaran
- Edited by: G.Murali
- Music by: Songs: Wilson Background Score: Rajamani
- Release date: 1997
- Running time: 131 minutes
- Country: India
- Language: Malayalam

Newspaper Boy is a 1997 Malayalam-language Indian feature film directed by Nissar, starring Mukesh, Jagathy Sreekumar and Suma (in her Malayalam debut) in lead roles.

== Plot ==
Krishnankutty, a theatre artist, struggles to apply for a visa and get a job in a foreign country. However, he lands in trouble when many people take advantage of his innocence

== Cast ==
- Mukesh as Krishnankutty
- Suma as Sita
- Jagathy Sreekumar as K.K. Ponnappan
- Kalabhavan Mani as Pyasi
- Kalpana
- Nadirsha as Rasheed
- Rajan P. Dev as Dada
- Cochin Haneefa as Jagadeeshwara Iyer
- Zainuddin as Phalgunan
- Salim Kumar as Venkiti
- K.T.S. Padannayil as Chellappan
- Machan Varghese as Pakki
- Meghanathan as Viswanathan
- Jose Pellisseri
- Kanakalatha
