= Laughing Apartment Near Girinagar =

- Theatrical release poster
- Directed by: Nissar
- Screenplay by: Nissar, P Parappuram
- Story by: P Parappuram
- Produced by: Ram Kumar
- Starring: Ramesh Pisharody, Dharmajan Bolgatty
- Cinematography: Ranjith Siva
- Edited by: Jayachandra Krishna
- Music by: Sajith Sankar
- Production company: RMK Productions
- Release date: 24 August 2018
- Country: India
- Language: Malayalam

Laughing Apartment Near Girinagar is a 2018 Indian Malayalam-language comedy film written and directed by Nissar and co-written by P Parappuram. The film stars Ramesh Pisharody and Dharmajan Bolgatty.

== Cast ==
- Ramesh Pisharody as Aravindan
- Dharmajan Bolgatty as Kunjan
- Anjana Appukuttan
- Aswathi Menon as Manju
- Geetha Vijayan as Bala
- K. T. S. Padannayil
- Kalabhavan Shajohn as Rahul
- Kottayam Nazeer as Appavi Security
- Ponnamma Babu
- Saju Kodiyan as Sudhakaran
- Salim Kumar as Thankarajan
- Sunil Sukhada as Swamy
- Pradeep Kottayam
- Saranya Anand

== Release ==
The film was scheduled for release on 17 August 2018, but was postponed because of Kerala floods issue. The film later released on 24 August 2018 (India).
