= Paravoor Ramachandran =

Indian actor (1945–2011)

Parvoor Ramachandran ( പരവൂർ രാമചന്ദ്രൻ )
- Paravoor Ramachandran
- Born: 1945; Paravoor
- Died: 4 January 2011 (aged 65); Kottayam, Kerala, India
- Other name: V Ramachandran
- Occupation: Actor
- Years active: 1996–2009

Paravoor Ramachandran (പരവൂർ രാമചന്ദ്രൻ; 1945–2011) was a Malayalam film actor.

== Acting career ==
Paravoor Ramachandran started his acting career as a theatre actor through Perumbavoor Nataka Sala at the age of 17. Later, he was an active member of the Kalidasa Kalakendram during 1973-75 and played major roles in many plays. His theatre career spanning around 25 years won him public acclaim.

His first film was Rajasenan's Sathyabhamakkoru Premalekhanam. Later, he became active in cinema and played important roles in films like Dilliwala Rajakumaran, Vasanthiyum Lakshmiyum Pinne Njaanum, Kathanayakan, Thooval Kottaram etc. He had acted in around 30 films. Yakshiyum Njanum was his last film, which was released in 2010. He had also played major roles in several teleserials.

== Personal life ==
Paravoor Ramachandran is survived by his wife Sathi Kumari and two children. He was born and lived in Madavoor village in Thiruvananthapuram District.

== Filmography ==
1. Sathyabhamakkoru Premalekhanam (1996) as Chandramangalathu Ramavarma
2. Dilliwala Rajakumaran (1996)
3. Swapna Lokathe Balabhaskaran(1996) as Kaimal
4. Rajaputhran (1996) as Dr. Rahman
5. Thooval Kottaram (1996) as Ramabhadran
6. Harbour (1996) as Chambakkara Paili
7. Superman (1997) as MRC
8. Kadha Nayakan (1997)
9. Kilukil Pamparam (1997)
10. Kottapurathe Koottukudumbam (1997) as DIG Ramakrishnan
11. Malabaril Ninnoru Manirmaran (1998)
12. Sreekrishnapurathe Nakshathrathilakkam (1998)
13. F.I.R. (1999) as Home Minister
14. Njangal Santhushtarannu (1999)
15. Ezhupunna Tharakan (1999)
16. Pranayaksharangal (2001)
17. Rasaleela (2001)
18. Nariman (2001) as Kuruvila
19. Kanal Kireedam (2002)
20. Shivam (2002)
21. The King Maker Leader (2003)
22. Achante Kochumolkku(2003)
23. Cheri (2003)
24. Sethurama Iyer CBI as Zachariah (Manikunju)
25. Yakshiyum Njanum (2009) as Vasudeva Gounder
