= Kudumbavilakku =

Indian television series

- Promotional poster of the series, official remake of Sreemoyee
- കുടുംബവിളക്ക് – Journey of a Homemaker
- Genre: Drama; Family drama
- Created by: Sangeetha Mohan (episodes 1–88); Anil Baas (episodes 89–1204)
- Based on: Sreemoyee
- Developed by: Gireesh Gramika
- Written by: Sreenidhi S.S (season 2)
- Story by: Leena Gangopadhyay
- Directed by: Sunil Kariattukara / Manju Dharman / Ruggu Ratheesh
- Starring: Meera Vasudevan
- Theme music composer: Shyam Dharman
- Opening theme: "Udayathin Munnpe Nee Pennpoovee"
- Composers: Shyam Dharman; Rajeev Attukal; Ramesh Narayan (Lyrics)
- Country of origin: India
- Original language: Malayalam
- No. of seasons: 2
- No. of episodes: 1204

Production
- Executive producer: Sanjeev Sajji
- Producer: Chitra Shenoy
- Cinematography: A. V. Arun Ravan (episodes 1–89); Vipin Puthiyankam (episodes 90–1204)
- Editor: Jishnu S. Kuryathi
- Camera setup: Multi-camera
- Running time: 22 minutes
- Production company: Good Company Productions

Original release
- Network: Asianet
- Release: 27 January 2020 – 3 August 2024

Related
- Sreemoyee; Baakiyalakshmi; Anupamaa

Kudumbavilakku (transl. Lamp of the Family) is an Indian Malayalam-language drama television series. It is an official remake of the Bengali television series Sreemoyee. The show premiered on Asianet and also streams on Disney+ Hotstar. Meera Vasudevan portrays the lead role in the series, returning to television after thirteen years.

The first season of the show aired from 27 January 2020 to 1 December 2023. The second season aired from 4 December 2023 to 3 August 2024.

The series was produced by Chitra Shenoy under Good Company Productions. It is among the longest-running soap operas in Malayalam television.

== Series overview ==
Seasons	Episodes	Original release	Last aired
1	1003	27 January 2020	1 December 2023
2	201	4 December 2023	3 August 2024

== Plot ==
=== Season 1 ===
The show centers on Sumithra Menon, a Malayalee homemaker, and her family. Sumithra is a dedicated wife, mother, and daughter-in-law who always puts her family first. She is married to Siddharth Menon, with whom she has three children: Anirudh, a doctor, Pratheesh, an aspiring musician, and Sheetal, a college student. They all live together with Siddharth’s parents, Shivadas and Saraswati.nobody cares Sumithra in her family except Shivadas, Pratheesh, Ananya, her daughter-in-law, and Saranya's husband.

Siddharth, however, falls in love with his Junior Officer, Vedhika, and eventually divorces Sumithra to marry her. After Siddharth married Vedhika, his life becomes changed. Despite the emotional pain, Sumithra gradually finds her self-worth and starts to rebuild her life. With the support of her family and friend Rohit, she starts a business called "Sumithra’s," with the help of Rohit gopal and Neelina, which grows into a successful venture. Throughout this period, Vedhika causes further trouble, but Sumithra perseveres, and her family, except for Saraswati, starts to recognize her value.

Siddharth’s life with Vedhika becomes strained, and he eventually files for divorce, hoping to remarry Sumithra. However, Shivadas and his family members pressures sumithra to wed Rohit, after they discovered about their past.

Sumithra marries her old classmate and friend, Rohit. Vedhika opposes the divorce at first, but later, she is diagnosed with cancer. Abandoned by Siddharth, she is taken in by Sumithra, and they eventually form a friendship. Vedhika recovers from her illness, while Siddharth, after an accident, is left paralyzed. Sumithra and her family care for him until he begins to recover.

The family faces more challenges, including the death of Shivadas from heart failure. Pratheesh and his wife Sanjana move to Chennai, and Ananya relocates abroad with Anirudh. Vedhika later reconnects with her ex-husband, Sampath, and they remarry. Siddharth, now alone, leaves Sreenilayam to find work, leaving Saraswati behind. Saraswati’s daughter, Saranya, takes her in, but tensions arise with Saranya’s husband, leading Saraswati to an old age home.

The season concludes with Sumithra, Rohit, and their daughter Pooja beginning a new chapter in life, as they set off on a trip together.

=== Season 2 ===
The show takes a six-year leap after Sumithra is in a coma due to an accident that also killed her husband, Rohit. She wakes up and learns her mother has died, and Rohit’s sister, Ranjitha, has taken over his property. Ranjitha wants her son to marry Pooja, but Pooja is in love with Appu. Anirudh and Ananya return to Kerala to save their marriage, while Pratheesh is released from jail after being accused of his wife’s murder. Sumithra uncovers Ranjitha’s fraud and reclaims Rohit’s property. In the end, Sumithra chooses to remain single, cherishing her memories of Rohit, while Pooja marries Appu. The series concludes with Sumithra at peace with her family and memories of Rohit in Sreenilayam.

== Cast ==
=== Main ===
- Meera Vasudevan as Sumithra – Rohit's widow; Savithri's daughter; Deepu's sister; Sidharth's ex-wife; Anirudh, Pratheesh and Sheethal's mother; Pooja's step-mother; Swara's grandmother. (2020–2024)
- Krishnakumar Menon as Sidharth "Sidhu" Menon – Shivdas and Saraswathi's son; Sharanya's brother; Sumithra and Vedika's ex-husband; Anirudh, Pratheesh and Sheethal's father; Swara's grandfather. (2020-2024)
- Dr. Shaju Sam as Rohit Gopal – Ranjitha's brother; Sumithra's classmate and husband; Pooja's father; Anirudh, Pratheesh and Sheetal's step-father; Swara's step-grandfather. (2021–2023) (Dead)
- Shwetha Venkat (Episode 1 to 58)/ Ameya Nair (Episode 58 to 110)/ Saranya Anand(Episode 111 to 1003) as Vedika – Vasumati's daughter; Siddharth's ex-wife; Sampath's wife; Neerav's mother; who hates Sumithra first, later they become best friends.
- F. J. Tharakan as Shivadas Menon – Saraswathi's husband; Sidharth and Sharanya's father; Anirudh, Pratheesh and Sheetal's grandfather; Swara's great-grandfather. (2020–2023) (Dead)
- Devi Menon as Saraswathi Menon – Shivdas's widow; Sidharth and Sharanya's mother; Anirudh, Pratheesh and Sheetal's grandmother; Sumithra's and Vedhika's Ex-Mother-in-law; Swara's great-grandmother. (2020-2024)
- Vaishnavi Saikumar as Ranjitha – Rohit's sister; Aravindhan's wife; Pankaj's mother. (2023–2024)

=== Recurring ===
- Sreejith Vijay / Anand Narayan as Dr. Anirudh Menon – Sumithra and Sidharth's elder son; Rohit's step-son; Pratheesh and Sheetal's brother; Pooja's step-brother; Ananya's husband; Swara's adoptive father. (2020; 2024) / (2020–2023)
- Athira Madhav / Ashwathy Ash/ Lekshmi Balagopal as Dr. Ananya Menon – Prema's daughter; Anirudh's wife; Swara's adoptive mother. (2020–2021) / (2021–2024)/ (2024)
- Noobin Johny as Pratheesh Menon – Sumithra and Sidharth's younger son; Rohit's step-son; Anirudh and Sheetal's brother; Pooja's step-brother; Sanjana's widower; Swara's father. (2020–2024)
- Reshma Nandu as Sanjana Menon – Ramakrishnan's daughter; Susheela's step-daughter; Maneesh's widow; Pratheesh's wife; Swara's mother. (2020–2023) (Dead)
- Parvathi Vijay / Amritha Nair / Sreelakshmi Sreekumar as Sheetal Menon – Sumithra and Sidharth's daughter; Rohit's step-daughter; Anirudh and Pratheesh's sister; Pooja's step-sister; Sachin's wife. (2020) / (2020–2021) / (2021–2024)
- Gouri Prakash / Aiswarya Unni / Varsha Vinod / Neema Rose as Pooja Gopal – Rohit's daughter; Sumithra's step-daughter; Anirudh, Pratheesh and Sheetal's step-sister; Jishnu's wife; Deepu and Chithra's daughter-in-law (2021–2022) / (2023–2024)
- Anoop Soorya as Sachin – Sheetal's husband. (2024)
- Hari as Deepankuran aka Deepu – Savithri's son; Sumithra's brother; Chithra's husband; Jishnu's father; Pooja's father-in-law. (2020–2024)
- Parvathy Raveendran as Chitra – Deepu's wife; Jishnu's mother; Pooja's mother-in-law. (2020–2024)
- Vishwa R as Jishnu – Chitra and Deepu's son; Anirudh, Pratheesh and Sheetal's cousin; Pooja's step-cousin. (2023–2024)
- Akhil as Young Jishnu (2020)
- Ziva Vivin / Mehak as Swara Menon – Sanjana and Pratheesh's daughter; Ananya and Anirudh's adopted daughter. (2023) / (2023–2024)
- Krishna as Premajam – Ananya's mother; Swara's adoptive grandmother. (2020–2024)
- Shibu Laban as Aravindhan – Ranjitha's husband; Pankaj's father. (2023–2024)
- Anjusree Bhadran as Latha –premaja's house help, Swara's Nani (2023–2024)
- Ashwathy Prabha as Seema – Sumitra's nurse. (2023)
- Kalidasan as Pankaj Aravindan – Rajitha and Aravind's son; Pooja's cousin (2023–2024)
- Kishore as Paramashivam (2023-2024)
- Sunitha as Savithri – Sumithra and Deepu's mother; Anirudh, Pratheesh, Sheethal and Jishnu's grandmother; Pooja's step-grandmother; Swara's great-grandmother. (2020–2023) (Dead)
- Fawaz Zayani (2020-2023) as Sampath – Vedika's husband; Neerav's father
- Manoj Nair (Episode 1 to 42)/ Sumesh Surendran as Sreekumar – Sharanya's husband; Nileena's former love interest. (2020–2023)
- Sindhu Varma (Episode 1 only)/ Manju Satheesh as Saranya Menon – Shivadas and Saraswathi's daughter; Sidharth's sister; Sreemukar's wife. (2020–2023)
- Manju Vijeesh as Mallika – Sreenilayam family's domestic help (2020–2023)
- Padmakumar as CI Narayanan Kutty – Circle Inspector of Police
- Bindhu Pankaj as Nileena Bhaskar – Sumithra's best friend since college; Shreekumar's former love interest
- Jithu Venugopal as Anoop – a goon who works for Mahendran
- Shahnu / Amrutha S Ganesh as Dr. Indraja – Anirudh's superior
- Angeline Mariya – Maya
- Firosh Mohan as Naveen – Vedika's friend
- Rachana as Sumi, Sumithra's office staff
- Aneesh Kailas as Vedika's office staff at Vasgo Exports
- Pathu Seena as Vedika's office staff at Vasgo Exports
- K. P. A. C. Saji / Amboori Jayan as Ramakrishnan – Sanjana's father; Bhagya's grandfather.
- Devi Chandana as Susheela – Ramakrishnan's second wife; Sanjana's step-mother; Bhagya's step-grandmother.
- Hari as Vivek – Rohith's friend
- Swathi Thara as DCP Chandralekha – IPS officer
- Renjusha Menon as SI Nirmala
- Sruthisha Nair as Shilpa – Member of Pratheesh's band who loves him
- Gyandev P Didhin as Neerav – Sampath and Vedika's son
- Geetha Nair as Vasumati – Vedika's mother; Neerav's grandmother
- Shobi Thilakan as Adv. Vasudevan – Sumithra and Siddharth's divorce lawyer
- Sarath Sreehari as Pianist – Pratheesh's bandmate
- Divya Sreedhar as Preetha's mother
- Saju Kodiyan as Rev. Francis Mupliyanthadathil – Sheethal's school principal
- Vanchiyoor Praveen Kumar as Udayabhanu – Shivadas's colleague who works at a resort
- Jeevan Gopal as Jithin Raj – A fraudster and drug addict who wants to marry Sheetal
- Alif Muhammed as Maneesh – Sanjana's first husband (Dead)
- Sheelasree as Maneesh's mother
- Maria Juliana as Deepa
- Sivaji Guruvayoor as Ananthan Vaidyar

==== Guest appearances ====
- Innocent as the chief guest at the Mother's Day Competition at Sheetal's school (episodes 5 and 6)
- Aju Varghese as himself, for the inauguration of Sumithra's shop (Episode 205)
- Neena Kurup as Kanaka ( episode 890)

== Reception ==
The show was launched on 27 January 2020 at 7.30 PM. After COVID-19 related break show began airing at 8.00 PM from 15 June 2020. The show maintained good TRP for over 3 years. The show was shifted to 10.00 PM from 20 November 2023 for climax episodes. But due to its high rating in the slot, the channel decided to extend the show by starting a new season from 4 December 2023 with taking a 6 years leap in the story and with a slight new cast. On 11 March 2024, the show was shifted to 6.00 PM due to launch of Bigg Boss season 6. As the second season didn't get much popularity as compared to predecessor, its viewership gradually decreased and went off-air on 3 August 2024.

== Accolades ==
Year	Award	Category	Recipient	Ref
2022	Asianet Television Awards	Most Popular Serial	Ruggu Ratheesh	
2022	Asianet Television Awards	Best Popular Actress	Meera Vasudevan (Sumithra Rohitgopal)	
2022	Asianet Television Awards	Best Popular Actor	Krishnakumar Menon (Sidharth menon)	
2022	Asianet Television Awards	Best Performance in a Negative Role	Saranya Anand (Vedhika)	
2022	Janmabhoomi Television Awards	Best Serial	Ruggu Ratheesh	
