= Captain (1999 film) =

- Directed by: Nissar
- Written by: Baton Bose
- Screenplay by: Thrissur Kannan
- Produced by: Anil Menon
- Starring: Vani Viswanath; Babu Antony; Captain Raju; Roopa Sri; Jagathy Sreekumar
- Cinematography: Utpal V. Nayanar
- Edited by: G. Murali
- Music by: Alleppey Ranganath
- Production company: Jayakerala Movies
- Distributed by: Jayakerala Movies
- Release date: October 1999
- Country: India
- Language: Malayalam

Captain is a 1999 Indian Malayalam-language film directed by Nissar and produced by Anil Menon. The film stars Vani Viswanath, Babu Antony, Captain Raju, Roopa Sri, Baiju and Jagathy Sreekumar in the lead roles. The film has musical score by Alleppey Ranganath.

== Cast ==
- Vani Viswanath as Renuka Varma
- Babu Antony as Ranger Haridas
- Captain Raju as Ranger Jayadevan
- Roopa Sri
- Jagathy Sreekumar as Ananthan Menon
- Kalabhavan Mani as Sathyanathan
- Baiju as Rajan
- Madhupal as David
- Sadiq as C.I. Antony Mathews
- Abu Salim as Keshavankutty
- American Achayan
- Bheeman Raghu as Rangan
- Bobby Kottarakkara as Kuttappan
- Devan as James Samuel
- Jose Pellissery as Alex
- Master Aswin
- Shakeela
- Usha

== Soundtrack ==
The music was composed by Alleppey Ranganath.

No.	Song	Singers	Lyrics	Length (m:ss)
1	"Kaakkothikkunnallayo"	M. G. Sreekumar, Kalabhavan Sabu	S. Ramesan Nair	
2	"O Maanathu"	K. S. Chithra, M. G. Sreekumar	S. Ramesan Nair	
