= Vamanapuram Bus Route =

2004 Indian film

- DVD cover
- Directed by: Sonu Shishupal
- Written by: Sudheesh-John
- Produced by: K. T. Anand Kumar
- Starring: Mohanlal; Lakshmi Gopalaswamy; Jagathy Sreekumar; Janardhanan
- Cinematography: Sanjeev Shankar
- Edited by: G. Murali
- Music by: Sonu Shishupal; C. Rajamani (score)
- Production company: Adithya Cine Vision
- Distributed by: Sreehari Release
- Release date: 23 January 2004
- Running time: 123 minutes
- Country: India
- Language: Malayalam

Vamanapuram Bus Route is a 2004 Indian Malayalam-language comedy-drama film directed by Sonu Shishupal and written by Sudheesh John, starring Mohanlal and Lakshmi Gopalaswamy. Shishupal also composed the songs featured in the film, while C. Rajamani provided the background score. The film was released on 23 January 2004.

== Plot ==
The hamlet of Vamanapuram has no bus service. The conflict between the ruling party and the opposition in the Panchayath prevents development in the village. The Panchayath President Gopalan Nair's ambition is to become a minister or at least a member of the Legislative Assembly. To finance his plans, he wants to pave the roads with asphalt and get funds from it. But the opposition stirs up trouble every time he tries. Then comes Lever Johnny and how he solves the problems forms the rest of the story.

== Cast ==
- Mohanlal as Lever Johnny, Johnnychayan
- Lakshmi Gopalaswamy as Meenakshi Nair
- Jagathy Sreekumar as Gopalan Nair, Panchayat President and Meenakshi's father
- Janardhanan as Bahuleyan
- Adithya Menon as Karippidi Gopi
- Nandu as Kuttappan
- Oduvil Unnikrishnan as Appukkuttan
- Machan Varghese as Velayudhan
- Innocent as Chandran Pillai (Cameo)
- Kottayam Naseer as Chaakkappan
- Maniyanpilla Raju as Rajappan
- Jagadish as Kumaran
- Rajan P. Dev as SI Ouseppu
- Augustine as Kuliru Thankappan
- V. K. Sreeraman as Gangadharan
- Baiju as Kunjachan
- K. T. S. Padannayil as Velappan Nair / Mummy Maman, Gopalan's father-in-law and Meenakshi's maternal grandfather
- Manka Mahesh as Ambujam, Gopalan Nair's wife and Meenakshi's mother
- Abu Salim as Udumbu Jose
- Saju Kodiyan as Ayyappan
- A. S. Joby as Mathapp

== Soundtrack ==
Beside directing, Sonu Shishupal also composed the songs featured in the film, lyrics were by Gireesh Puthenchery. The background score was composed by C. Rajamani. The film reused the song "Rajavin Paarvai" from the 1966 Tamil film Anbe Vaa, originally composed by M. S. Viswanathan. The soundtrack album was released by MC Audios & Videos.

Vamanapuram Bus Route (Original Motion Picture Soundtrack)
| No. | Title | Singer(s) | Length |
|---|---|---|---|
| 1. | "Enniyenni Chakkakkuru" | M. G. Sreekumar | 4:44 |
| 2. | "Ezhai Paravakale" | M. G. Sreekumar | 5:10 |
| 3. | "Niragopurakkuri Charthi" | K. J. Yesudas | 4:55 |
| 4. | "Rajavin Paarvai" | S. P. Balasubrahmanyam, K. S. Chithra | 4:25 |
| 5. | "Thaane En Thamburu" | Manjari | 4:46 |
| 6. | "Unnimaavilooyalitta" | M. G. Sreekumar, Rimi Tomy | 4:55 |
| 7. | "Vaamanapuramunde" | M. G. Sreekumar | 5:13 |

== Release and reception ==
Vamanapuram Bus Route was released on 23 January 2004. It opened major in Savitha Films Ernakulam and other 35 centres Kerala. The film received unfavourable reviews from critics. Sify's critic wrote that "our heart goes out to Mohanlal, one of the finest actors in the country who is being wasted in insipid films". Despite the criticism, the film managed to remain in all 36 theatres in its third week. In a 19 February 2004 box office report, The Hindu wrote that "Mohanlal's Vamanapuram Bus Route is doing its third week in 36 centres in Kerala and doing good business outside Kerala".The film ended its box office run as a failure.
