= Sree Narayana College, Chempazhanthy =

- Type: Public
- Established: 1964
- Affiliations: University of Kerala
- Location: Chempazhanthy, Kerala, India
- Campus: Urban
- Nickname: SNC
- Website: www.sncollegechempazhanthy.ac.in

Sree Narayana College, Chempazhanthy, is a general degree college in Chempazhanthy, Thiruvananthapuram district, Kerala. It was established in 1964. The college is affiliated with Kerala University. It offers courses in arts, commerce and science.

The Sree Narayana College, Chempazhanthy, on an undulating verdant campus of 30 acres, was formally inaugurated on 20 July 1964, by Sri. R. Sankar the then Chief Minister of Kerala. Prof. T.C. Rajan, the noted social scientist, was the first principal.

== Self Financing ==
There is a self financing college: Sree Narayana Guru College of Advanced Studies, Chempazhanthy (SNGCAS) started in 2013. The Self-Financing College offers the following courses:

- MA English
- M.Com
- BA English
- BSc Geography
- BSc Geology
- BSc Chemistry
- BSc Physics.
- B.Com Tax Procedure and Practice
- B.Com Corporation

== Departments ==
=== Post graduation ===
- MA English
- MSc Chemistry
- MA History

=== Science ===
- Physics
- Chemistry
- Mathematics
- Statistics
- Geology
- Botany
- Zoology
- Psychology

=== Arts and Commerce ===
- Malayalam
- English
- Hindi
- History
- Political Science
- Economics
- Sociology
- Physical Education
- Commerce

== Accreditation ==
The college is recognized by the University Grants Commission (UGC).

== Notable alumni ==
- V. Sivankutty, Former Minister of Education, State of Kerala
- Prem Kumar (Malayalam actor)
- Raj Kalesh, Anchor, Magician, Stage performer
- MA Vaheed, ex MLA
- RS Vimal, film director
- Kadakampally Surendran, minister
- D. K. Murali, MLA
- V. Joy, MLA
- M. M. Hassan, former minister
- G.S. Pradeep, TV Personality, Quiz Master, Orator
