= Three Men Army =

- Directed by: Nissar
- Written by: Govardhan
- Produced by: Nandu
- Starring: Dileep; Premkumar; Indrans
- Cinematography: Venu
- Edited by: G. Murali
- Music by: Achu; Rajamani
- Release date: August 1995
- Country: India
- Language: Malayalam

Three Men Army is a 1995 Indian Malayalam-language comedy-drama film directed by Nissar, starring Dileep, Prem Kumar and Indrans in the titlular roles.

== Plot ==
Three roommates, Madhukumar, Benny Kurien, and Surendran have optimistic dreams. Surendran fantasizes about becoming a movie star like Rajinikanth. Madhukumar, who aspires to be a police officer, in turn wants to marry his lover Shubha. Shubha is the daughter of K. R. G. Menon. Benny Kurien is a con artist who needs to support his family. The trio confronts a bad guy named Thomas who kidnaps Shubha and Benny's girlfriend. With the help of a former police officer, Rajesh, the three men fight back.

== Cast ==
- Dileep as Muthukulam Madhukumar
- Prem Kumar as Benny Kurien
- Indrans as "Basha" Surendran
- Devayani as Shubha
- Harisree Ashokan as Susheelan
- Janardhanan as K. R. G. Menon
- Rajan P. Dev as Thomas
- Vijayaraghavan as Rajesh
- Kalpana as Indira Devi
- Zeenath as Subhashini
- K. T. S. Padannayil as House Owner
- N. L. Balakrishnan as Temple Committee Member
- Narayanankutty as Police Constable
- Silk Smitha as herself
- Jayasurya as Boy at cinema theater (cameo appearance)
- Adoor Pankajam as Indira Devi's mother
- Baburaj as Gunda
- Darshana as Maya
- Elias Babu as Shiv Amarnath Kulkarni
- Jayasanker Karimuttam as Kathaprasangam troupe member
