= Bigg Boss (Malayalam TV series) season 6 =

Bigg Boss
- Season 6
- Presented by: Mohanlal
- No. of days: 99
- No. of housemates: 25
- Winner: Jinto Devassykutty
- Runner-up: Arjun Syam Gopan
- No. of episodes: 99

Release
- Original network: Asianet; Disney+ Hotstar
- Original release: 10 March – 16 June 2024

Series chronology
- ← Previous; Season 5 Next → Season 7

Bigg Boss Malayalam (Season 6) is the sixth season of the Malayalam-language adaptation of the Indian reality television series Bigg Boss, produced by Endemol Shine India and Banijay. The season premiered on March 10, 2024, on Asianet, with a 24/7 live stream also available on the Disney+ Hotstar OTT platform (deferred live). Malayalam film actor Mohanlal returned as the host for the sixth consecutive year.

On launch day, a total of 19 contestants entered the Bigg Boss house, comprising a mix of celebrities, social media influencers, and three commoners selected from the public.

The season concluded on June 16, 2024, with Jinto Devassykutty winning the title. Arjun Syam Gopan was declared the first runner-up.

Creative Team: Arjun Menon was the project head of this show. The show is produced by Endemol Shine Group. Riya Cherian was the creative director. Saif Mohammad was the associate creative director, Sheshan was the PCR head. Vineesh Nair, Ramya, Pearl, and Jeeva are the episode directors.

== Housemates status ==
Sr	Housemate	Day entered	Day exited	Status
1	Jinto	Day 0	Day 99	Winner
2	Arjun	Day 0	Day 99	1st Runner-up
3	Jasmin	Day 0	Day 99	2nd Runner-up
4	Abhishek	Day 29	Day 99	3rd Runner-up
5	Rishi	Day 0	Day 99	4th Runner-up
6	Sreethu	Day 0	Day 95	Evicted
7	Sijo	Day 0	Day 16	Hospitalized
7	Sijo	Day 45	Day 91	Evicted
8	Norah	Day 0	Day 90	Evicted
9	Sai	Day 29	Day 86	Walked
10	Nandana	Day 29	Day 83	Evicted
11	Ansiba	Day 0	Day 77	Evicted
12	Apsara	Day 0	Day 76	Evicted
13	Resmin	Day 0	Day 31	Hospitalized
13	Resmin	Day 33	Day 73	Evicted
14	Sreerekha	Day 0	Day 63	Evicted
15	Saranya	Day 0	Day 62	Evicted
16	Gabri	Day 0	Day 55	Evicted
17	Abhishek	Day 29	Day 49	Evicted
19	Sibin	Day 29	Day 43	Hospitalized
19	Sibin	Day 46		Walked
18	Pooja	Day 29	Day 44	Hospitalized
18	Pooja	Day 46		Walked
20	Jaanmoni	Day 0	Day 41	Evicted
21	Yamuna	Day 0	Day 27	Evicted
22	Rocky	Day 0	Day 15	Ejected
23	Suresh	Day 0	Day 14	Evicted
24	Nishana	Day 0	Day 13	Evicted
25	Ratheesh	Day 0	Day 7	Evicted
25	Ratheesh	Day 48	Day 56	Guest

== Housemates ==
The participants are given below in the order of their entrance into the Bigg Boss House.

=== Original entrants ===
- Ansiba Hassan - Film actress, television anchor, RJ and dancer.
- Jinto Devassykutty- Celebrity personal trainer, former Mister Kerala.
- Yamuna Rani - Film and TV actress, debuted in movie Stalin Sivadas, notable work TV serial Jwalayayi, 5-star thattukada and Chandanamazha.
- Rishi S Kumar - TV, film actor and dancer, known for Uppum Mulakum.
- Jasmin Jaffer- Social media content creator.
- Sijo John- Social media content creator.
- Sreethu Krishnan - Actress, dancer, and model known for her work in the Tamil and Malayalam TV and flim industries, especially for Ammayariyathe on Asianet.
- Jaanmoni Das - Celebrity makeup artist and LGBTQ+ activist.
- Ratheesh Kumar - Comedian, actor, anchor and Playback singer, known for anchoring the TV show Valkannadi.
- Sreerekha Rajagopal - Film and TV actress, won Best Character Actress award at the 51st Kerala State Film Awards for her debut film Veyil.
- Asi Rocky - Tattoo artist, kickboxing champion, model and bike rider.
- Apsara Rathnakaran - Film and TV actress, known for her role in Santhwanam.
- Gabri Jose - Film actor known for role in Pranaya Meenukalude Kadal.
- Norah Muskan - Social Media influencer and content creator.
- Arjun Syam Gopan - Model and former Mister Kerala.
- Suresh Menon - Film and TV actor, Stand-up comedian and entrepreneur. He participated in Jhalak Dikhhla Jaa 6.
- Saranya Anand - Film and TV actress and dancer, widely known for her role in Kudumbavilakku.
- Resmin Bai - Physical education teacher, Anchor and Biker (commoner – selected from the public).
- Nishana N - Motorcycle adventurer, avid traveler and trekker (commoner – selected from the public).

=== Wildcard entrants ===
- Abhishek Jayadeep - Model, first runner-up in Mister Gay World India 2023 and former Mister Gay Kerala.
- DJ Sibin Benjamin - DJ, choreographer and rapper.
- Nandana C - Student and social media content creator (commoner).
- Abhishek Sreekumar - Actor, entrepreneur and social media content creator.
- Pooja Krishna - Social media anchor, actress and dancer.
- Sai Krishnan (aka Secret Agent) - Social media content creator.

== Guest appearances ==
Week(s)	Day(s)	Guest(s)	Purpose of Visits
Week 1	Day 0	Mohanlal	To introduce the season 6 Bigg Boss house.
Week 1	Day 0	Rinosh George (Season 5 contestant)	Special performance on stage.
Week 5	Day 35	Mohanlal	To celebrate Vishu with the housemates.
Week 7	Day 47	Dileep	To promote his movie Pavi Caretaker and interact with the housemates.
Week 7	Day 48-56	Ratheesh Kumar (Former Season 6 contestant)	To offer consolation to the other contestants if needed.
Week 7	Day 49	Sajan Surya, Bini Sebastian, Sreejith Vijay, Hari Shankar, Veena Nair, Mansi Joshi, Sajesh Nambiar, Lakshmi Keerthana, Vishnu V Nair, Naleef Gea, Aishwarya Ramsai, Aiswarya Suresh, Visal Ramachandran, Sabumon Abdusamad, Pearle Maaney, Srinish Aravind, Dr.Rajith Kumar, Remya Panicker, Noby Marcose, Akhil Kutty, Reneesha Rahiman, Sobha Vishwanath & Akhil Marar	Wishes for the 50th episode through video to the housemates. (Video)
Week 9	Day 58-61	Sabumon Abdusamad (Season 1 Winner)	Guests in the Power Room Challenge Task; Bigg Boss Hotel.
Week 9	Day 59-61	Shweta Menon (Season 1 contestant)	Guests in the Power Room Challenge Task; Bigg Boss Hotel.
Week 10	Day 65-70		
Week 10	Day 65-70	Guest(s) / Contestant / Relation / Day(s); Pushpalatha & Rishesh / Rishi S Kumar / Mother & Brother / Day 65; Rasiya & Asib / Ansiba Hassan / Mother & Brother / Day 65; Shyamala & Aswini / Arjun Syam Gopan / Mother & Sister / Day 66; Sreeja / Sreethu Krishnan / Mother / Day 66; Saradha & Anjana / Nandana C / Mother & Sister / Day 67; Devassykutti & Cicily / Jinto Bodycraft / Parents / Day 67; Sobanakumari & Alby / Apsara Rathnakaran / Mother & Husband / Day 68; Sneha / Sai Krishnan / Wife & Father (on video call) / Day 68; Sreekumar & Anjana / Abhishek Sreekumar / Father & Sister / Day 69; Anwar Sadat & Beevi / Norah Muskan / Parents / Day 69; John & Monsi / Sijo John / Parents / Day 69; Jafar & Rahila / Jasmin Jaffar / Parents / Day 70; Haseena & Abdul Razzaq / Resmin Bai / Mother & Brother / Day 70	Family Week
Week 11	Day 72	Ranjini Haridas (Season 1 contestant)	Co-Host Mohanlal's birthday special episode. (On Stage)
Week 11	Day 72	Vijay Yesudas	Mohanlal's birthday mashup performance (On stage) and Special performance with housemates.
Week 11	Day 72	Krishnankutty (Business head regional Disney Star), Kishen Kumar (Channel head Asianet), Priyaraj Govindaraj (Mathrubhumi social media head), and Jayakrishnan (General manager Club FM	To Honour Mohanlal on his birthday and Launch of A10font and Cinema Kadha (On Stage).
Week 11	Day 72	Common people of Kerala	Video wishes for Mohanlal's birthday episode. (Video)
Week 12	Day 78	Sagar Surya (Season 5 contestant), Junaiz VP (Season 5 contestant), Joju George, Abhinaya, Vaishnavi (interpreter for Abhinaya)	To promote their movie Pani and interact with the housemates.
Week 13	Day 88	Urvashi	To promote her movie Ullozhukku and interact with the housemates.
Week 13	Day 89	Jeethu Joseph and Antony Perumbavoor	Guest in BiggBoss Film Audition and interact with the housemates.
Week 14	Day 92-97	Jaanmoni Das and Yamuna Rani	Reunion with the Finalists
Week 14	Day 93-97	Pooja Krishna and Sreerekha Rajagopal	Reunion with the Finalists
Week 14	Day 94-97	Resmin Bai, Ratheesh Kumar and Apsara Rathnakaran	Reunion with the Finalists
Week 14	Day 95-97	Gabri Jose, Saranya Anand and Abhishek Jayadeep	Reunion with the Finalists
Week 14	Day 96-97	Ansiba Hassan, Nishana N and Suresh Menon	Reunion with the Finalists
Week 14	Day 97	Nandana C, Norah Muskan, Sai Krishnan, Sijo John and Sreethu Krishnan	Reunion with the Finalists
Week 14	Day 94	Raksha Raj, Yuva Krishna and Sasha	To promote their TV series Janakiyudeyum Abhiyudeyum Veedu and interact with the housemates.
Week 14	Day 96	Praseetha and team	Special performance at Bigg Boss House.
Week 14	Day 99	Vidhu Prathap and Sithara	Perform finale wake-up song at Bigg Boss House and informed the re-launch of Star Singer season 9
Week 14	Day 99	Madan	Sketch drawing (On Gallery)
Week 14	Day 99	Jaanmoni Das, Yamuna Rani, Pooja Krishna, Sreerekha Rajagopal, Resmin Bai, Ratheesh Kumar, Apsara Rathnakaran, Gabri Jose, Saranya Anand, Abhishek Jayadeep, Ansiba Hassan, Nishana N, Suresh Menon, Nandana C, Norah Muskan, Sai Krishnan, Sijo John and Sreethu Krishnan	On Stage Gallery and stage performance.
Week 14	Day 99	Akhil Kutty, Sooraj Thelakkad, Noby Marcose, Veena Nair, Nadira Mehrin, Reneesha Rahiman	Skit (on stage)
Week 14	Day 99	Sruthi Lakshmi, Dhanya Mary Varghese, Shakthisree Gopalan, Dilsha Prasannan, Neeta Pillai, Jaffer Sadiq	Special Performances (on stage)
Week 14	Day 99	Mohanlal	To bring the remaining two housemates from the Bigg Boss house to the finale event stage.

== Bedroom allotment ==
This season's Bigg Boss house features four uniquely named bedrooms: the Den, the Nest, the Power Room, and the Tunnel. Each week, victors of specific tasks or those chosen by the Captain will gain entry to these rooms. Additionally, each room is tasked with specific responsibilities around the house. Since team tasks ended in Week 11, bedroom allotment has also been discontinued.

=== The Power Room ===
The Power Room reigns supreme within the Bigg Boss house. Members of the other rooms must win the Power Room Tasks to secure a coveted spot within its walls. Those who dwell in the Power Room hold ultimate sway over the Bigg Boss house. This includes immunity from nominations, the ability to discipline rule-breakers, the power to directly nominate someone for eviction or jail, exemption from household chores, and a host of other privileges.

- Until Week 5, house captains could use the Power Room. But from Week 5 onwards, they're barred from it and aren't assigned to any room.
- Starting from Week 10, the concept of the 'Power Room' has been discontinued, and the room has been renamed the "People's Room".

Housemate	Week 1	Week 2	Week 3	Week 4	Week 5	Week 6	Week 7	Week 8	Week 9	Week 10	Week 11	Week 12
Abhishek S					Tunnel	Nest	Tunnel		Power	Nest	Captain	Concept ended for the season
Arjun	Captain	Den		Power		Den	Nest		Den	Nest		Concept ended for the season
Jasmin	Tunnel	Power	Tunnel		Captain	Tunnel	Den		Nest			Concept ended for the season
Jinto	Tunnel		Power		Den	Captain	Den					Concept ended for the season
Norah	Nest				Den	Nest	Tunnel		Power	People		Concept ended for the season
Rishi	Den				Tunnel	Power		Tunnel	Captain	Nest		Concept ended for the season
Sijo	Nest		Captain				Nest	Nest		Tunnel		Concept ended for the season
Sreethu	Nest					Tunnel	Captain	Den		People		Concept ended for the season
Sai					Den	Nest	Tunnel	Power	Tunnel			Concept ended for the season
Nandana					Den	Nest	Tunnel	Power	Tunnel	Captain	Den	Concept ended for the season
Ansiba	Den		Captain	Den	Nest	Tunnel	Den		Power	People		
Apsara	Den	Captain	Nest		Power	Den	Nest		Tunnel			
Resmin	Tunnel		Power			Den	Nest	Captain	Power	Den		
Sreerekha	Power		Tunnel		Nest	Tunnel	Power		Nest			
Saranya	Nest				Tunnel	Power			Tunnel			
Gabri	Power		Tunnel		Power	Den	Power	Nest				
Abhishek K					Den	Nest	Tunnel					
Pooja					Tunnel	Power	Power					
Sibin					Nest	Power	Den					
Jaanmoni	Power		Tunnel	Captain	Tunnel	Power						
Yamuna	Power		Tunnel									
Rocky	Den		Den									
Suresh	Nest											
Nishana	Power	Tunnel										
Ratheesh	Tunnel							—N/a				

== Weekly summary ==
Week 1	Entrances	Day 0: Ansiba Hassan, Jinto Devassykutty, Yamuna Rani, Rishi S Kumar, Jasmin Jaffar, Sijo John, Sreethu Krishnan, Jaanmoni Das, Ratheesh Kumar, Sreerekha Rajagopal, Asi Rocky, Apsara Rathnakaran, Gabri Jose, Norah Muskan, Arjun Shyam Gopan, Suresh Menon, Saranya Anand, Resmin Bai and Nishana N entered the Bigg Boss house as Original Entrants.
Week 1	House Captain	Day 1-7: Arjun Syam Gopan was the House Captain of Week 1.
Week 1	Captaincy Task	Day 1: Hero: In the garden area, a mud pool awaited, teeming with plastic balls. Upon the green light flashing, contestants would eagerly plunge in, racing against time to fill labeled baskets placed outside. However, they had to exit the pool before the red light flashed; those remaining inside would be disqualified. A warning yellow light served as a precursor to the impending red light. The ultimate victor would be determined by whoever collected the most balls when the final siren sounded. Arjun has won the task to became the House Captain of Week 1.
Week 1	Nominations	Day 1: Ansiba, Jinto, Norah, Ratheesh, Rocky, Saranya, Sijo and Suresh were nominated for the 1st Week eviction process.
Week 1	Power Team	Day 1-7: Gabri, Jaanmoni, Nishana, Sreerekha and Yamuna were selected by captain. (Duty Cooking)
Week 1	Rooms and Members	Rooms / Members / Duty / Task1 / Task2 / Total; DEN / Ansiba, Apsara, Rishi & Rocky / Restroom Care / 1 / 1 / 2; NEST / Norah, Saranya, Sijo, Sreethu & Suresh / Floor Care / 2 / 2 / 4; TUNNEL / Jasmin, Jinto, Resmin & Ratheesh / Vessel Care / 0 / 0 / 0
Week 1	PowerTeam Challenge	Day 3-5: In Bigg Boss Season 6, the Power Team members will enjoy exclusive privileges, as the season revolves around the benefits offered by the Power Room. Each week, challenging tasks will determine the selection of Power Team members. Members residing in other rooms will compete against each other, and the winner among them will challenge the current Power Team members. The victor will then become the Power Team for the following week. Kadakku Purathu (Challenge 1): In the activity area, each of the three teams will have the opportunity to present arguments for why they deserve to be selected for the Power Team over the other teams. The task will begin and end with a buzzer. Ultimately, the assigned judges should select a winning team. Truth or Fake (Challenge 2): For this task, photo cut-outs of random contestants will be placed around the activity area. Each cut-out will feature two statements about the contestants, with one containing incorrect information. In the given time the participating contestants must identify and remove the incorrect information from each cut-out Avasana Kachithurumb (Challenge 3): In this task, the challengers' team is pitted against the existing power team. Within the designated activity area, members of the current power team will each occupy a chair positioned at the center of the room. The challenge for the opposing team is to provoke reactions from these seated individuals without resorting to physical contact, all within a specified time frame. The existing Power Team emerged victorious in the task.
Week 1	Jail	Day 5: The Power Team selected Jinto Bodycraft, while the Housemates voted for Ratheesh Kumar, both of whom were sent to jail.
Week 1	Exits	Day 7: Ratheesh Kumar was evicted from the Bigg Boss House after facing the public vote.
Week 2
Week 2	House Captain	Day 8-14: Apsara Rathnakaran was the House Captain of Week 2.
Week 2	Captaincy Task	Day 5: Housemates voted and selected Apsara, Resmin and Sijo for week 2 Captaincy task. Day 7: Hero No:2: The captaincy task involves contestants wrapped in cling film navigating a track to pick up apples with their mouths and deposit them in a bowl at the opposite end. Contestants can't use their hands, and the winner is the one who collects the most apples within the time frame. Apsara has won the task to became the House Captain of Week 2.
Week 2	Nominations	Day 8: Jinto, Nishana, Norah, Resmin, Rishi, Rocky, Sijo and Suresh were nominated for the 2nd Week eviction process.
Week 2	Power Team	Day 8-14: Gabri, Jaanmoni, Jasmin, Sreerekha and Yamuna
Week 2	Rooms and Members	Rooms / Members / Duty / Task1 / Task2 / Total; DEN / Ansiba, Arjun, Rishi & Rocky / Floor Care / 0 / 1 / 1; NEST / Norah, Saranya, Sijo, Sreethu & Suresh / Kitchen Care / 2 / 0 / 2; TUNNEL / Jinto, Nishana & Resmin / Restroom Care / 1 / 2 / 3
Week 2	PowerTeam Challenge	Day 9-12: Ee Kuttikkaru Manikettum (Challenge 1): The power team will pick members to pretend to be kids and give challenges to each team. Each team will have to take care of their assigned 'kid' and act like different families. After the game, the power team will meet to decide and announce the winning team. Kerala Paadavali (Challenge 2): In the activity area, a large board displaying the outline of Kerala acts as the setting for puzzles representing each of its 14 districts, featuring pieces with a mix of accurate and misleading clues. Teams are called upon individually to take on the challenge, striving to piece together the puzzle correctly within the allocated time. Aanjupidicho Ailesa (Challenge 3): Each teams selects one random contestants to sit on their platform. Each platform has its own rope and pulley. When the buzzer sounds, both teams will start pulling their ropes through the pulleys. The team which holds onto the rope for the longest time wins the game. Tunnel Team emerged victorious in the task.
Week 2	Jail	Day 12: The Power Team selected Arjun Syam Gopan, while the Housemates voted for Nishana N, both of whom were sent to jail.
Week 2	Exits	Day 13: Nishana N was evicted from the Bigg Boss House after facing the public vote. Day 14: Suresh Menon was evicted from the Bigg Boss House after facing the public vote.
Week 3
Week 3	House Captain	Day 15-16: Sijo John was the House Captain of Week 3. Day 16-21: Ansiba Hassan was the House Captain of Week 3.
Week 3	Captaincy Task	Day 12: Housemates voted and selected Ansiba, Rocky and Sijo for week 3 Captaincy task. Day 14: Adhikara Petti: In the garden area, there will be three tubs filled with water, three tunnels filled with sand, and three podiums each holding a locked box. Once the buzzer sounds, each of the three contestants must select a key from their respective tubs and navigate through the sand-filled tunnels to reach the podiums. Their task is to unlock one of the boxes using their chosen key. If they select the wrong key, they must return to their tub, select a different key, and try again. The first contestant to successfully open a box will be declared the winner. Sijo has won the task to became the House Captain of Week 3.
Week 3	Nominations	Day 15: Ansiba, Arjun, Gabri, Jaanmoni, Jasmin, Norah, Sreerekha and Yamuna were nominated for the 3rd Week eviction process.
Week 3	Power Team	Day 15-21: Jinto and Resmin
Week 3	Rooms and Members	Rooms / Members / Duty / Task1 / Task2 / Total; DEN / ~~Ansiba~~, Arjun & Rishi / Restroom Care / 2 / 0 / 2; NEST / Apsara, Norah, Saranya & Sreethu / Kitchen Care / 0 / 2 / 2; TUNNEL / Gabri, Jaanmoni, Jasmin, Sreerekha & Yamuna / Floor Care / 1 / 1 / 2
Week 3	PowerTeam Challenge	Day 16-18: BB Circus (Challenge 1): Nritha Vismayangal (Act 1) - Each team must choose one contestant to perform. Bigg Boss will then provide suitable costumes and assign a specific song to each contestant. When the song starts, the chosen contestant for that particular song must rush to the stage to showcase their performance. The Power team will serve as the judges for this task. Aarude Kaiyil Mookk (Act 2) - Teams have to select one contestant each. Upon hearing the buzzer signal from the Power team, contestants swiftly don the clown costume from the living area and hasten to the garden stage to wear the clown nose provided. Winners will be determined by the order in which contestants wear the nose on stage. The Power team retains the authority to determine when to sound the buzzer. Cycle Savari (Act 3) - Teams must choose one contestant each. In the garden area, there will be three cycles and tracks. Once the buzzer sounds, the selected contestants must ride their assigned cycles along the tracks and get the flag that placed at the endpoint. The winners will be determined based on the order in which contestants retrieve the flag. Yathrakaarude Sradhakku (Challenge 2): In the activity area, there will be three rows of boxes set up. When the buzzer sounds, one contestant from each team must walk across the boxes. Some of these boxes are fragile. If a contestant steps on one of these weak boxes, their teammate must take over. The team that steps on more sturdy boxes wins the challenge.: Since all three teams have earned the same number of points, Bigg Boss asked the Power Team to choose one team to compete against them, and they chose NEST.; Catch the Ball (Challenge 3): In the activity area, two lean and long tables will be arranged, each featuring a ball at its edge and a bucket beneath. When the buzzer sounds, two members from each team align the provided blocks one after the other behind the ball in a straight line. Once aligned, they must touch the final block, prompting the ball to drop into the bucket. The game will consist of three rounds, with the team accumulating the highest score declared as the winner. The existing Power Team emerged victorious in the task.
Week 3	Jail	Day 19: The Power Team selected Gabri Jose, while the Housemates voted for Jasmin Jaffar, both of whom were sent to jail.
Week 3	Exits	Day 15: Asi Rocky was ejected from the show for violating the rules.
Week 4
Week 4	House Captain	Day 22-28: Jaanmoni Das was the House Captain of Week 4.
Week 4	Captaincy Task	Day 19: Housemates voted and selected Jaanmoni, Norah and Sreethu for week 4 Captaincy task. Day 19: Adithettiyal Aanayum Veezhum: In this task, a set of ski boards will be provided. The legs of the selected participants will be securely tied to these boards. From the moment the game starts, all three must walk together. If anyone falls or loses their footing, they will be eliminated from the task. The ultimate winner will be the last participant standing. Jaanmoni has won the task to became the House Captain of Week 4.
Week 4	Nominations	Day 22: Ansiba, Apsara, Gabri, Jasmin, Norah, Rishi, Sreethu and Yamuna were nominated for the 4th Week eviction process.
Week 4	Power Team	Day 22-28: Arjun, Jinto and Resmin
Week 4	Rooms and Members	Rooms / Members / Duty / Task1 / Task2 / Task3 / Total; Power / Arjun, Jinto & Resmin / —N/a / 1 / 0 / 3 / 4; DEN / Ansiba & Rishi / Restroom Care / 2 / 0 / 2 / 4; NEST / Apsara, Norah, Saranya & Sreethu / Floor Care / 3 / 0 / 2 / 5; TUNNEL / Gabri, Jasmin, Sreerekha & Yamuna / Kitchen Care / 2 / 3 / 2 / 7; This week, all four teams have to participate in Power team Challenges.; ★ The captain chose to support Team Den in tasks.
Week 4	PowerTeam Challenge	Day 23-25: Alakku Company (Challenge 1): In the garden area, dresses will await mending. Once the buzzer sounds, team members must gather dresses and water as needed, then efficiently mend them within the allocated time. The Power Team will first assess dresses mended by Tunnel, followed by Tunnel evaluating Nest. Then, Nest evaluates the Den, and finally, Den assesses Power Teams's performance. Battery Low (Challenge 2): For this task, cardboard mockup phones with photos of each contestant will be placed on a table. When the first buzzer sounds, contestants must rush to grab a phone, making sure not to choose the one with their own photo. At the second buzzer, they must hurry to the opposite side and place their chosen cardboard model on a charging panel. This model must remain on the panel until the third buzzer. Bigg Boss has intentionally provided fewer charging slots than there are phone models. Any model that cannot be placed on a charging slot will result in the elimination of the contestant whose photo is on that phone. Each round will see Bigg Boss reducing the number of charging slots. The last contestant remaining at the end of the task will emerge as the winner. Karakkum Khaana (Challenge 3): In the living area, podiums will be set up for each team alongside bottles for flipping, with a variety of food items placed opposite each podium on large trays. Team members will take turns flipping the bottles, aiming to land them upright to earn the chance to enjoy a dish from their team's tray, one at a time. The team that completes their tray first will emerge as the victors.
Week 4	Jail	Day 26: The Power Team selected Gabri Jose, while the Housemates voted for Norah Muskan, both of whom were sent to jail.
Week 4	Exits	Day 27: Yamuna Rani was evicted from the Bigg Boss House after facing the public vote.
Week 5
Week 5	Entrances	Day 29: Abhishek Jayadeep, DJ Sibin Benjamin, Nandana C, Abhishek Sreekumar, Pooja Krishna and Sai Krishnan entered the Bigg Boss house as Wildcard Entrants.
Week 5	House Captain	Day 29-35: Jasmin Jaffar was the House Captain of Week 5.
Week 5	Captaincy Task	Day 26: The winners of the Power Team Challenges in week 4, Tunnel Team, discussed and selected Jasmin as the House Captain for Week 5.
Week 5	Nominations	Day 29: Abhishek S, Ansiba, Jaanmoni, Jinto, Norah, Rishi, Saranya, Sreerekha and Sreethu were nominated for the 5th Week eviction process.
Week 5	Power Team	Day 29-35: Arjun, Apsara, Gabri and Resmin
Week 5	Rooms and Members	Rooms / Members / Duty / Task1 / Task2 / Total; DEN / Abhishek K, Jinto, Nandana, Norah & Sai / Floor Care / 0 / 1 / 1; NEST / Ansiba, Sibin, Sreerekha & Sreethu / Restroom Care / 1 / 1 / 2; TUNNEL / Abhishek S, Jaanmoni, Pooja, Rishi & Saranya / Kitchen Care / 2 / 2 / 4
Week 5	PowerTeam Challenge	Day 30-32: Hot Seat (Challenge 1): The Power Team acts as reporters in a press conference setup, with the captain serving as the moderator. They invite other teams one by one, following Bigg Boss's cues. With three set questions in hand, they can ask more based on answers. After all three interviews, the captain can ask one extra question to each team. Then, based on everyone's performance, the Power Team will choose the winners. Aaradhyam Parayum (Challenge 2): The living area will be transformed into a quiz room, with the captain taking on the role of quiz master and managing the game. Three sets of questions related to the current season will be prepared. Each team will have a buzzer to signal their readiness. The team that buzzes in first will have the chance to answer; if they're incorrect, the other team will have a turn. The team with the highest score will be declared the winners. Vadam Vali (Challenge 3): In this task, the challengers' team will compete against the current power team in a Tug of War challenge. Both teams can rally support from other contestants in the house. The challenge will consist of three rounds in the garden area. The team that wins the most rounds will be declared the overall winner. Tunnel Team emerged victorious in the task.
Week 5	Jail	Day 33: The Power Team selected Ansiba Hassan, while the Housemates voted for Sai Krishnan, both of whom were sent to jail.
Week 5	Exits	Day 35: None
Week 6
Week 6	House Captain	Day 36-42: Jinto Devassykutty was the House Captain of Week 6.
Week 6	Captaincy Task	Day 33: Each team, except for the Tunnel Team, has nominated Gabri, Sreerekha, & Jinto, while Abhishek K, Nandana, & Sreethu have volunteered themselves as candidates for the week 6 captaincy task. Day 33: Ballet Box: The captaincy task operated on a ballot system, where housemates cast their votes for the candidates, with the ballot box placed in the garden area. Jinto has won the task to became the House Captain of Week 6.
Week 6	Nominations	Day 36: Abhishek S, Ansiba, Jaanmoni, Jinto, Norah, Rishi, Sai, Saranya, Sreerekha and Sreethu were nominated for the 6th Week eviction process.
Week 6	Power Team	Day 36-42: Jaanmoni, Pooja, Rishi, Saranya and Sibin
Week 6	Rooms and Members	Rooms / Members / Duty / Task1 / Task2 / Total; DEN / Arjun, Apsara, Gabri & Resmin / Kitchen Care / 1 / 1 / 2; NEST / Abhishek S, Abhishek K, Nandana, Norah & Sai / Floor Care / 0 / 2 / 2; TUNNEL / Ansiba, Jasmin, Sreerekha & Sreethu / Restroom Care / 2 / 0 / 2
Week 6	PowerTeam Challenge	Day 37-39: Melodrama (Challenge 1): In the activity area, each team must perform a melodrama on stage, depicting events from the Bigg Boss house. The power team will judge the performances. After the entire show, each team must approach the judges to receive points tokens. The team with the highest number of points will emerge as the winner. Karakattam (Challenge 2): In the garden area, separate sections will be designated for each team. When the buzzer sounds, each team member must balance and carry two pots in their hands and one pot on their head. These pots will be filled with water. Contestants who fail to maintain balance will be eliminated from the task. The team that endures the longest will emerge victorious.: Since all three teams have earned the same number of points, Bigg Boss asked the Power Team to choose one team to compete against them, and they chose NEST.; Aavesham (Challenge 3): Bread (Round 1) - In the activity area, there will be two pairs of chairs with ropes threaded through hooks. Each team will receive six loaves of bread. A member from each team will participate by sitting on one chair, tying one end of the rope to their toe, and attaching a bread loaf to the other end. The objective is to eat all six loaves before the final buzzer sounds to win the task. Njaninmel kudi (Round 2) - In the garden area, one contestant from each team will be tied to a pole. Their task is to pull up cups attached to ropes and consume the soft drink within. After finishing each cup, the team captain must replenish it. The winner will be the contestant who consumes the most cups within the allotted time. Power Kick (Round 3) - A Subsoccer setup was arranged in the activity area, with one contestant from each team participating. The team that scores the most goals will emerge victorious within the given time. The existing Power Team emerged victorious in the task.
Week 6	Jail	Day 40: The Power Team selected Norah Muskan, while the Housemates voted for Jasmin Jaffar, both of whom were sent to jail.
Week 6	Exits	Day 41: Jaanmoni Das was evicted from the Bigg Boss House after facing the public vote.
Week 7
Week 7	House Captain	Day 43-49: Sreethu Krishnan was the House Captain of Week 7.
Week 7	Captaincy Task	Day 40: Housemates voted and selected Jinto, Nandana and Sreethu for week 7 Captaincy task. Day 40: Pantheru: In the garden area, each contestant will have their own pedestal fan, table, bowl, and set of balls. The fans will be operational. Contestants must throw the balls onto the table in front of them, aiming to land them in their respective cups. The contestant who successfully places the most balls in their cup within the given time will win the task. Sreethu has won the task to became the House Captain of Week 7.
Week 7	Nominations	Day 43: Abhishek K, Abhishek S, Ansiba, Arjun, Apsara, Jasmin, Jinto, Nandana, Norah, Resmin, Sai and Sibin were nominated for the 7th Week eviction process.
Week 7	Power Team	Day 43-49: Gabri, Rishi, Saranya and Sreerekha
Week 7	Rooms and Members	Rooms / Members / Duty / Task1 / Task2 / Total; DEN / Ansiba, Jasmin & Jinto / Kitchen Care / 2 / 2 / 4; NEST / Arjun, Apsara, Resmin & Sijo / Restroom Care / 0 / 2 / 2; TUNNEL / Abhishek S, Abhishek K, Nandana, Norah & Sai / Floor Care / 1 / 2 / 3
Week 7	PowerTeam Challenge	Day 44-46: Power Tower (Challenge 1): In the garden area, circular-shaped materials will be provided for each team to construct their towers. When the buzzer sounds, teams must both build their tower and strategize to defend it while attempting to dismantle their opponents'. The team with the tallest tower at the final buzzer wins the task. Aparan (Challenge 2): A task will be set up in the living area using the plasma TV, where four images will be displayed. Participating contestants must memorize these images. Upon hearing the buzzer, they'll retrieve image blocks from the garden area and place them on designated podiums for each team, situated opposite the garden area. The contestant who completes the task fastest before the buzzer will win. Each team will have one different contestant participating in each of the three rounds. Danger Coin (Challenge 3): Every contestant is required to wear a unique jacket for this task. The objective is to discreetly attach a coin onto the jacket of an opponent from the opposing team. During the buzzer period, if a contestant is found with the coin on their jacket, they are eliminated from the round. The team with the final contestant remaining will claim victory in the task.. The existing Power Team emerged victorious in the task.
Week 7	Jail	Day 47: The Power Team selected Jinto Bodycraft, while the Housemates voted for Jasmin Jaffar, both of whom were sent to jail.
Week 7	Exits	Day 46: DJ Sibin Benjamin and Pooja Krishna were walked off the house due to health issues. Day 49: Abhishek Jayadeep was evicted from the Bigg Boss House after facing the public vote.
Week 8
Week 8	House Captain	Day 50-56: Resmin Bai was the House Captain of Week 8.
Week 8	Captaincy Task	Day 47: Housemates voted and selected Abhishek K, Norah and Resmin for week 8 Captaincy task. Day 48: Kappithan: In the activity area, there will be a vertical mesh for each contestant. Plastic balls will be placed in a bowl on one side of the mesh. When the buzzer sounds, contestants must use their fingers to retrieve a plastic ball from the other side of the mesh through the holes, bring the ball to the top, and roll it into a box placed below through the groove in the upper part of the mesh. Resmin has won the task to became the House Captain of Week 8.
Week 8	Nominations	Day 50: Abhishek S, Ansiba, Arjun, Gabri, Jasmin, Jinto, Norah, Rishi and Sijo were nominated for the 8th Week eviction process.
Week 8	Power Team	Day 50-56: Nandana, Sai, Saranya and Sreerekha
Week 8	Rooms and Members	Rooms / Members / Duty / Task1 / Task2 / Task3 / Total; POWER / Nandana, Sai, Saranya & Sreerekha / —N/a / 2 / 0 / —N/a / 2; DEN / Ansiba, Jasmin, Jinto & Sreethu / Kitchen Care / 0 / 2 / —N/a / 2; NEST / Arjun, Apsara, Gabri & Sijo / Floor Care / 1 / 1 / —N/a / 2; TUNNEL / Abhishek S, Norah & Rishi / Restroom Care / 3 / 3 / —N/a / 6; This week, all four teams have to participate in Power team Challenges.; ★ The captain chose to support Team Tunnel in tasks.
Week 8	PowerTeam Challenge	Day 51-53: Atithi Devo Bhava (Challenge 1): Each team will be provided with life-sized dolls, symbolizing guests. A balloon will be affixed to each doll. Once the buzzer sounds, the teams' mission is to defend their own doll while strategically attacking others'. The dolls whose balloons burst will be considered as the "death" of the corresponding guest, leading to the elimination of the particular team that owns the doll. Ranabhoomi (Challenge 2): The garden area has been transformed into a battleground, with individual barracks designated for each team. They will be equipped with protective shields, guns, and a box of color bombs. Following a buzzer, teams must engage in debates and provoke their opponents. When the war siren blares, teams can launch color bombs at each other from their barracks. The goal is to defend their barracks using the provided shields and guns against incoming bombs. After the next buzzer, the team with more bombs in their barracks from the opposing teams will be eliminated from the round. Rounds will continue at intervals until only one team remains standing. (Challenge 3): Cancelled because Team Tunnel scored the maximum points.
Week 8	Jail	Day 54: The Power Team selected Gabri and Jinto, while the Housemates voted for Abhishek and Sijo, for jail task. After losing the task, Abhishek Sreekumar and Sijo John were sent to jail.
Week 8	Exits	Day 55: Gabri Jose was evicted from the Bigg Boss House after facing the public vote.
Week 9
Week 9	House Captain	Day 57-63: Rishi S Kumar was the House Captain of Week 9.
Week 9	Captaincy Task	The winners of the Power Team Challenges in week 8, Tunnel Team, are participating in this task. Day 53: Super Over: In the garden area, a cricket pitch has been prepared for the contestants. Each participant must bowl using a legal cricket action. The contestant who manages to take the highest number of wickets will emerge victorious in the task. Rishi has won the task to became the House Captain of Week 9.
Week 9	Nominations	Day 57: Apsara, Jinto, Nandana, Saranya, Sijo, Sreerekha and Sreethu were nominated for the 9th Week eviction process.
Week 9	Power Team	Day 57-63: Abhishek S, Ansiba, Norah, and Resmin
Week 9	Rooms and Members	Rooms / Members / Duty / Task1 / Task2 / Total; DEN / Jinto, Arjun & Sreethu / Restroom Care / 2 / 2 / 4; NEST / Jasmin, Sijo & Sreerekha / Kitchen Care / 1 / 1 / 2; TUNNEL / Nandana, Apsara, Sai & Saranya / Floor Care / 1 / —N/a / 1
Week 9	PowerTeam Challenge	Day 58-60: Bigg Boss Hotel: The Bigg Boss house has been transformed into a world-class star hotel, with the Power Team acting as its owners. The Captain will be the HR Manager. Bigg Boss has organized three distinct departments from which each team can select: the Kitchen and Room Service Department, the Housekeeping Department, and the Entertainment and Therapy Department. External guests will be arriving at the hotel, and the objective is to please them and accumulate points. The team accruing the most points over the initial two days will face off against the current power team in the challenge on the third day. Day 1 (Challenge 1): Today's arrival was International Prankster Sabu. Team Den as Kitchen and Room Service Department, team Nest as Housekeeping Department, team Tunnel as Entertainment and Therapy Department. Day 2 (Challenge 2): Today's arrival was none other than Princess Alexandra, a distinguished member of the renowned Bossanga Empire. Alongside her, she carries a remarkable diamond infused with immunity powers. Whoever obtains this diamond will be safeguarded from eviction during the 10th week of the contest. Team Den as Housekeeping Department, team Nest as Entertainment and Therapy Department, team Tunnel as Kitchen and Room Service Department. (Challenge 3): Tolf Task1: Within the activity area, there's a table allocated for each team, featuring 10 holes. Additionally, each team is provided with 10 balls. One member from each team participates in the task. Following the buzzer, they must roll the ball from one end of the table, aiming to sink it into the holes. The team whose member successfully sinks a ball into all the holes first wins the task. Chakravyooham Task2: Teams will be given a colored tire and seven bottle pins, placed on their respective sides. When the buzzer sounds, players must stand in their assigned areas and roll the tire to knock down the pins. The team that knocks down the most pins before the buzzer wins the task. Karkkum Panth Task3: In the garden area, a long table is set up with a net positioned at one end, featuring a rotating batsman model holding a bat. Each contestant's challenge is to roll the ball across the table after the buzzer and aim to score by depositing it into the net without any contact with the bat. The objective is to achieve this within the allocated time frame. The contestant who manages to successfully put balls into the net without touching the bat within the specified time wins the task. Den Team emerged victorious in the task.
Week 9	Jail	Day 61: The Power Team selected Jasmin Jaffar while the Housemates voted for Rishi S Kumar both of whom were sent to jail.
Week 9	Exits	Day 62: Saranya Anand was evicted from the Bigg Boss House after facing the public vote. Day 63: Sreerekha Rajagopal was evicted from the bigg Boss House after facing the public vote
Week 10
Week 10	House Captain	Day 64-70: Nandana C was the House Captain of Week 10.
Week 10	Captaincy Task	Day 61: Housemates voted and selected Nandana, Saranya and Sreerekha for week 10 Captaincy task. Nandana has won the task to became the House Captain of Week 10.
Week 10	Nominations	Day 64: Abhishek S, Ansiba, Apsara, Arjun, Jasmin, Jinto, Resmin, Rishi and Sreethu were nominated for the 10th Week eviction process.
Week 10	Rooms and Members	Rooms / Members / Duty; DEN / Jinto & Resmin / Vessel Care; NEST / Abhishek S, Arjun, Jasmin & Rishi / Floor Care; PEOPLE / Ansiba, Norah & Sreethu / Kitchen Care; TUNNEL / Apsara, Sai & Sijo / Restroom Care; ★ Nandana was part of team Den in tasks.
Week 10	Bumper Bonus Task - Week 1	Day 65-70: Ticket to Finale Bumber Bonus Task: There will be continuous tasks for the next two weeks, and the team that earns the most points will gain bonus points for the Ticket to Finale Tasks. Task 1: Pathappikkal: The garden area has been set up with four sets of showers, and each team will be provided with a bar of soap. Two contestants from each team can participate, but only one contestant can use the soap at a time. The objective of the task is to completely use up the soap. Task 2: Veluppikkal: In the garden area, each team will be provided with stained utensils, but there will be only one bottle of dishwashing liquid for all teams. Each team will also receive one coconut. After the buzzer sounds, contestants must first collect their coconut and then use its husk as a scrub to wash the utensils. The task is to clean most number of utensils well. Task 3: Thalayanamanthram: In the activity area, cotton will be provided for filling pillows. After the buzzer sounds, one contestant from each team must collect enough cotton. Then, the team members will work together to make pillows using the provided materials. The task is to produce most high-quality pillows. Task 4: Urulum Thalika: At the activity area, after the buzzer sounds, contestants from each team must take turns carrying a flat plate with a hole in the center, balancing an egg in the hole. The goal is to navigate the plate through a puzzle course without letting the egg fall. The team that successfully carries the most eggs to the destination will win the task. Task 5: Just Remember that: In the activity area, the value of pi will be displayed on the plasma TV. Contestants will enter the area as a team and must memorize the digits of pi in sequence. Each contestant is required to remember at least 10 consecutive digits before passing the task to the next team member, who will then continue from where the previous contestant left off. The task for each team is to successfully recall the most consecutive digits in the correct order. Task 6: Orkkapurath: Two members from each team will work together. They'll need to hold a gym ball between their backs and navigate to a designated area in the garden where clothes are scattered. Their goal is to collect the clothes, fold them neatly, and place them on a table, all while maintaining their grip on the gym ball. If the ball drops, more than three times they'll be disqualified.: Teams / Bumber Bonus Task & Points (Week 1); Teams / Task 1 / Task 2 / Task 3 / Task 4 / Task 5 / Task 6 / Total; DEN / 1 / 3 / 0 / 3 / 1 / 2 / 10; NEST / 2 / 2 / 3 / 0 / 3 / 3 / 13; PEOPLE / 0 / 1 / 3 / 0 / 2 / 0 / 6; TUNNEL / 3 / 2 / 0 / 3 / 3 / 1 / 12
Week 10	Jail	Day 71: Apsara, Nandana and Sijo, were nominated for the jail task after finishing in the last three positions in Ranking task. Jail task cancelled for the week.
Week 10	Exits	Day 73: Resmin Bai was evicted from the bigg Boss House after facing the public vote
Week 11
Week 11	House Captain	Day 71-77: Abhishek Sreekumar was the House Captain of Week 11.
Week 11	Captaincy Task	Day 71: Bigg Boss conducted a ranking task, and at the end of the task, he unexpectedly announced that the contestant in the top position would become the captain for week 11. Abhishek S has won the task to became the House Captain of Week 11.
Week 11	Nominations	Day 73: Abhishek S, Ansiba, Apsara, Arjun, Jasmin, Jinto, Rishi and Sreethu were nominated for the 11th Week eviction process.
Week 11	Rooms and Members	Rooms / Members / Duty; DEN / Jinto & Nandana / Kitchen Care; NEST / Arjun, Jasmin & Rishi / Floor Care; PEOPLE / Ansiba, Norah & Sreethu / Restroom Care; TUNNEL / Apsara, Sai & Sijo / Vessel Care; ★ Abhishek S was part of team Nest in tasks.
Week 11	Bumper Bonus Task - Week 2	Day 74-75: Task 7: Kattappa: TBA; Task 8: Parappikkal: TBA; Task 9: Chithram: TBA: Teams / Bumber Bonus Task & Points (Week 2); Teams / Week 1 / Task 7 / Task 8 / Task 9 / Total; DEN / 10 / 2 / 0 / 3 / 15; NEST / 13 / 3 / 3 / 2 / 21; PEOPLE / 6 / 0 / 1 / 0 / 7; TUNNEL / 12 / 1 / 2 / 1 / 16; After a debate among the teammates, they decided to award Rishi the bonus points due to their concerns
Week 11	Jail	Day 75: The Housemates voted for Abhishek S and Norah Muskan and they were sent to jail.
Week 11	Exits	Day 76: Apsara Rathnakaran was evicted from the bigg Boss House after facing the public vote Day 77: Ansiba Hassan was evicted from the bigg Boss House after facing the public vote
Week 12
Week 12	House Captain	Day 78-84: Sijo John was the House Captain of Week 12.
Week 12	Captaincy Task	Day 75: Housemates voted and selected Arjun, Jinto and Sijo for week 12 Captaincy task. Sijo has won the task to became the House Captain of Week 12.
Week 12	Nominations	Day 78: Abhishek S, Jasmin, Nandana, Norah, Rishi, Sai and Sreethu were nominated for the 12th Week eviction process.
Week 12	Ticket To Finale	Day 79–82: All the housemates need to participate in all of the tasks part of the Ticket to Finale. All the housemates receive points on how they play each task given. Eventually, the housemate with the most points at the end wins the ticket to the finale and enters the Finale Week without getting evicted. Task 1: Golden Rabbit, Task 2: Kayyala Purath, Task 3: Panthaattam, Task 4: Chanjaattam, Task 5: Kaithaangu, Task 6: Poochakkaru Manikettum, Task 7: Chavittu Nadakam, Task 8: Mukhamudra, Task 9: Chorcha Sidhantham: Housemate / Ticket To Finale Tasks & Points; Housemate / Task 1 / Task 2 / Task 3 / Task 4 / Task 5 / Task 6 / Task 7 / Task 8 / Task 9 / Bonus Points / Total; Abhishek S / 3 / 3 / 2 / 2 / 1 / 0 / 0 / 2 / 0 / 0 / 13; Arjun / 0 / 2 / 0 / 0 / 2 / 0 / 1 / 3 / 0 / 0 / 8; Jasmin / 0 / 0 / 0 / 1 / 0 / 0 / 0 / 0 / 0 / 1 / 2; Jinto / 0 / 0 / 0 / 3 / 3 / 0 / 0 / 0 / 0 / 0 / 6; Nandana / 0 / 0 / 0 / 0 / 0 / 0 / 0 / 0 / 1 / 0 / 1; Norah / 0 / 0 / 0 / 0 / 0 / 0 / 3 / 0 / 0 / 0 / 3; Rishi / 0 / 0 / 1 / 0 / 0 / 3 / 2 / 0 / 0 / 1 / 7; Sai / 2 / 0 / 3 / 0 / 0 / 0 / 0 / 1 / 2 / 0 / 8; Sijo / 0 / 1 / 0 / 0 / 0 / 0 / 0 / 0 / 3 / 0 / 4; Sreethu / 0 / 0 / 0 / 0 / 0 / 3 / 0 / 0 / 0 / 0 / 3; Abhishek S received the most points and won the Ticket to Finale and got entry to the Finale Week
Week 12	Exits	Day 83: Nandana C was evicted from the Bigg Boss House after facing the public vote.
Week 13
Week 13	House Captain	Day 85-91: Norah Muskan was the House Captain of Week 13.
Week 13	Nominations	Day 85: Arjun, Jasmin, Jinto, Norah, Rishi, Sai, Sijo and Sreethu were nominated for the 13th Week eviction process.
Week 13	Money Box	Day 86: Bigg Boss placed one money box containing ₹5,00,000. If anybody touches the box, they had to take it and leave.
Week 13	Exits	Day 86: Sai Krishna accepted the Money Box and walked away from the show. Day 90: Norah Muskan was evicted from the Bigg Boss House after facing the public vote. Day 91: Sijo John was evicted from the Bigg Boss House after facing the public vote.
Week 14
Week 14	Nominations	Day 92: Abhishek S, Arjun, Jasmin, Jinto, Rishi and Sreethu were nominated for the finale voting process.
Week 14	Exits	Day 95: Sreethu Krishnan evicted from the Bigg Boss House after facing the public vote.
Week 14	4th Runner up	Day 98: Rishi S Kumar (Won My G gift samsung galaxy s24)
Week 14	3rd Runner up	Day 98: Abhishek Sreekumar (Won My G gift)
Week 14	2nd Runner up	Day 98: Jasmin Jaffar (Won My G gift)
Week 14	1st Runner up	Day 98: Arjun Syam Gopan (Won My G gift)
Week 14	Winner	Day 98: Jinto Devassykutty (Won 50 lakh cash prize)

== Nominations table ==
	Week 1	Week 2	Week 3		Week 4	Week 5	Week 6	Week 7	Week 8	Week 9	Week 10	Week 11	Week 12	Week 13	Week 14			
	Week 1	Week 2	Day 15	Day 16	Week 4	Week 5	Week 6	Week 7	Week 8	Week 9	Week 10	Week 11	Week 12	Week 13	Finale			
Nominees for Captaincy	All Housemates	Apsara; Resmin; Sijo	Ansiba; Rocky; Sijo		Jaanmoni; Norah; Sreethu	Gabri; Jasmin; Sreerekha; Yamuna	Abhishek K Gabri; Jinto; Nandana; Sreerekha; Sreethu	Jinto; Nandana; Sreethu	Abhishek K Norah; Resmin	Abhishek S Norah; Resmin; Rishi	Nandana; Saranya; Sreerekha	All Housemates	Arjun; Jinto; Sijo	No; Nominees				
House Captain	Arjun	Apsara	Sijo	Ansiba	Jaanmoni	Jasmin	Jinto	Sreethu	Resmin	Rishi	Nandana	Abhishek S	Sijo	Norah	No; Captain			
PowerTeam's Nominations	Rocky	Jinto	Arjun		Apsara	Jinto	Not eligible	Resmin	Jasmin	Saranya	Concept ended							
BB Prison	Jinto; Ratheesh	Arjun; Nishana	Gabri; Jasmin		Gabri; Norah	Ansiba; Sai	Jasmin; Norah	Jasmin; Jinto	Abhishek S Sijo	None	Abhishek S Norah	None						
Vote to:	Evict										Evict/Save	Evict				WIN		
Jinto	Sijo; Suresh	Nishana; Rocky	Gabri; Norah		Gabri; Jasmin	Saranya; Sreethu	Nominated	Abhishek K Ansiba	Norah; Rishi	Nandana; Sreerekha	Arjun (to evict)	Nominated	Sai; Sijo	Nominated	Nominated	Finalist	Winner (Day 98)	
Arjun	Ansiba; Norah	Nishana; Norah	Gabri; Yamuna		Jasmin; Yamuna	Abhishek S Jaanmoni	Not eligible	Abhishek S Ansiba	Ansiba; Gabri	Nandana; Sreerekha	Jinto (to evict)	Nominated	Abhishek S Nandana	Nominated	Nominated	Finalist	1st runner-up (Day 98)	
Jasmin	Suresh; Sijo	Rishi; Norah	Jaanmoni; Sreethu		Sreethu; Yamuna	Abhishek S Sai	Not eligible	Ansiba; Nandana	Ansiba; Norah	Jinto; Sreethu	Abhishek S (to evict)	Nominated	Norah; Sai	Nominated	Nominated	Finalist	2nd runner-up (Day 98)	
Abhishek S	Not In House				Entered (Day 29)	Abhishek K Jaanmoni	Nominated	Abhishek K Ansiba	Ansiba; Apsara	Sreerekha; Sreethu	Jasmin (to evict)	Nominated	Jasmin; Sreethu	TTF; Winner	Nominated	Finalist	3rd runner-up (Day 98)	
Rishi	Jinto; Ansiba	Nishana; Sreethu	Jasmin; Sreerekha		Jasmin; Sreethu	Abhishek S Sreethu	Nominated	Abhishek K Arjun	Arjun; Jinto	Nandana; Sijo	Apsara (to evict)	Nominated	Norah; Sai	Nominated	Nominated	Finalist	4th runner-up (Day 98)	
Sreethu	Ratheesh; Suresh	Suresh; Nishana	Gabri; Jasmin		Gabri; Jasmin	Abhishek S Rishi	Nominated	Ansiba; Nandana	Gabri; Ansiba	Apsara; Nandana	Sijo (to evict)	Nominated	Nandana; Sai	Nominated	Nominated	Evicted (Day 95)		
Sijo	Ansiba; Jinto	Resmin; Norah	Yamuna; Norah	Hospitalized (Day 16)				Not eligible	Ansiba; Rishi	Apsara; Sreerekha	Sreethu (to evict)	Not eligible	Jasmin; Rishi	Nominated	Evicted (Day 91)			
Norah	Saranya; Jinto	Sijo; Nishana	Gabri; Jasmin		Gabri; Jasmin	Jaanmoni; Saranya	Nominated	Abhishek S Jinto	Arjun; Jinto	Jinto; Sreethu	Ansiba (to evict)	Not eligible	Abhishek S Nandana	Nominated	Evicted (Day 90)			
Sai	Not In House				Entered (Day 29)	Jaanmoni; Sreerekha	Not eligible	Ansiba; Norah	Norah; Rishi	Sreerekha; Sreethu	Sijo (to save)	Not eligible	Rishi; Sreethu	Nominated	Walked (Day 86)			
Nandana	Not In House				Entered (Day 29)	Ansiba; Pooja	Not eligible	Abhishek K Arjun	Gabri; Jinto	Sreerekha; Sreethu	Sijo (to save)	Not eligible	Arjun; Sreethu	Evicted (Day 83)				
Ansiba	Resmin; Norah	Resmin; Nishana	Gabri; Jasmin		Jasmin; Sreerekha	Abhishek S Saranya	Nominated	Apsara; Norah	Gabri; Sijo	Sreerekha; Sreethu	Norah (to save)	Nominated	Evicted (Day 77)					
Apsara	Suresh; Jinto	Nishana; Norah	Gabri; Yamuna		Ansiba; Rishi	Ansiba; Jaanmoni	Not eligible	Ansiba; Jinto	Ansiba; Rishi	Sijo; Sreethu	Rishi (to evict)	Nominated	Evicted (Day 76)					
Resmin	Suresh; Ansiba	Rocky; Rishi	Jaanmoni; Sreerekha		Jasmin; Rishi	Jaanmoni; Rishi	Not eligible	Abhishek S Ansiba	Jinto; Sijo	Sijo; Sreerekha	Nominated	Evicted (Day 73)						
Sreerekha	Sijo; Norah	Rocky; Sijo	Gabri; Jasmin		Ansiba; Yamuna	Ansiba; Jaanmoni	Nominated	Arjun; Apsara	Arjun; Jinto	Arjun; Jinto	Evicted (Day 63)							
Saranya	Norah; Ratheesh	Suresh; Norah	Gabri; Jasmin		Gabri; Jasmin	Ansiba; Norah	Nominated	Jinto; Norah	Gabri; Jinto	Nandana; Sreerekha	Evicted (Day 62)							
Gabri	Jinto; Sijo	Norah; Rishi	Ansiba; Jaanmoni		Saranya; Yamuna	Jaanmoni; Norah	Not eligible	Ansiba; Jinto	Ansiba; Jinto	Evicted (Day 55)								
Abhishek K	Not In House				Entered (Day 29)	Abhishek S Ansiba	Not eligible	Ansiba; Nandana	Evicted (Day 49)									
Pooja	Not In House				Entered (Day 29)	Abhishek S Jaanmoni	Not eligible	Hospitalized	Walked (Day 46)									
Sibin	Not In House				Entered (Day 29)	Abhishek S Ansiba	Not eligible	Abhishek K Arjun	Walked (Day 46)									
Jaanmoni	Ratheesh; Suresh	Nishana; Rocky	Gabri; Jasmin		Jasmin; Norah	Abhishek S Sreerekha	Nominated	Evicted (Day 41)										
Yamuna	Ratheesh; Norah	Ansiba; Norah	Ansiba; Gabri		Jasmin; Norah	Evicted (Day 27)												
Rocky	Saranya; Jinto	Nishana; Norah	Nominated	Ejected (Day 15)														
Suresh	Ratheesh; Jasmin	Rocky; Nishana	Evicted (Day 14)															
Nishana	Ratheesh; Sijo	Rocky; Norah	Evicted (Day 13)															
Ratheesh	Saranya; Ansiba	Evicted (Day 7)							Guest (Day 48)									
Notes	1, 2	3, 4, 5	6, 7, 8, 9, 10, 11			12, 13, 14	15, 16, 17, 18	19, 20, 21, 22	23, 24	25, 26, 27	28. 29, 30	31	32	33				
Against Public Vote	Ansiba; Jinto; Norah; Ratheesh; Rocky; Saranya; Sijo; Suresh	Jinto; Nishana; Norah; Resmin; Rishi; Rocky; Sijo; Suresh	Ansiba; Arjun; Gabri; Jaanmoni; Jasmin; Norah; ~~Rocky~~; Sreerekha; Yamuna		Ansiba; Apsara; Gabri; Jasmin; Norah; Rishi; Sreethu; Yamuna	Abhishek S Ansiba; Jaanmoni; Jinto; Norah; Rishi; Saranya; Sreerekha; Sreethu		Abhishek K Abhishek S Ansiba; Arjun; Apsara; Jasmin; Jinto; Nandana; Norah; Resmin; Sai; ~~Sibin~~	Abhishek S Ansiba; Arjun; Gabri; Jinto; Jasmin; Norah; Rishi; Sijo	Apsara; Jinto; Nandana; Saranya; Sijo; Sreerekha; Sreethu	Abhishek S Ansiba; Apsara; Arjun; Jasmin; Jinto; Resmin; Rishi; Sreethu	Abhishek S Ansiba; Apsara; Arjun; Jasmin; Jinto; Rishi; Sreethu	Abhishek S Jasmin; Nandana; Norah; Rishi; Sai; Sreethu	Arjun; Jasmin; Jinto; Norah; Rishi; ~~Sai~~; Sijo; Sreethu	Abhishek S Arjun; Jasmin; Jinto; Rishi; Sreethu			
Walked	None							Pooja; Sibin	None					Sai	None			
Ejected	None		Rocky		None													
Evicted	Ratheesh	Nishana	No; Eviction		Yamuna	Eviction; Postponed	Jaanmoni	Abhishek K	Gabri	Saranya	Resmin	Apsara	Nandana	Norah	Sreethu	Rishi	Abhishek S	Jasmin
Evicted	Ratheesh	Suresh	No; Eviction		Yamuna	Eviction; Postponed	Jaanmoni	Abhishek K	Gabri	Sreerekha	Resmin	Ansiba	Nandana	Sijo	Sreethu	Arjun	Jinto	

=== Notes ===
indicates the House Captain.
indicates the member of Power Team.
indicates the Nominees for house captaincy.
indicates that the Housemate was directly nominated for eviction prior to the regular nomination process.
indicates that the Housemate was granted immunity from nominations.
indicates ticket to finale winner.
indicates the winner.
indicates the first runner up.
indicates the second runner up.
indicates the third runner up.
indicates the fourth runner up.
indicates the contestant was in Jail.
indicates the contestant has re-entered the house.
indicates the contestant has been hospitalized.
indicates that the Housemate was in the Secret Room.
indicates that the Housemate was in the Secret Room for violating Bigg Boss rules.
indicates a new wildcard contestant.
indicates the Eviction free pass has been used on a housemate.
indicates the contestant has been walked out of the show.
indicates the contestant has been evicted.
indicates the contestant was ejected from the Bigg Boss house.

- ^Note 1 : Day 0: Bigg Boss gave Nishana and Reshmin a special power: they could watch all housemates enter the house from a special room.
- ^Note 2 : Day 5: Bigg Boss installed a Proto hologram screen in the living area, featuring Mohanlal as CID Ramdas, will be tasked with observing and documenting the show's events, ultimately reporting them back to the host.
- ^Note 3 : Day 8: Bigg Boss announced that, following audience feedback, the current power team is ineffective. Consequently, they must rank themselves, with the lowest-ranked member surrendering their position, creating a chance for another housemate to join. Jasmin joined power team replacing Nishana.
- ^Note 4 : Day 8: Bigg Boss announced that starting this week, the Power Team won't have to do regular house chores like others.
- ^Note 5 : Day 13: Bigg Boss announced that Rocky is directly nominated for next week's eviction process for purposely breaking the house property.
- ^Note 6 : Day 15: Rocky was ejected from the show for physically assaulting Sijo.
- ^Note 7 : Day 16: Sijo was hospitalized for minor surgery following a physical attack by Rocky.
- ^Note 8 : Day 16: Due to Sijo's hospitalization, Bigg Boss requested Ansiba to assume the role of captain for the remainder of the week, until Sijo's return.
- ^Note 9 : Day 17: Since Rocky's unforeseen expulsion and Sijo's hospitalization, the nominations for the third week have been rendered invalid.
- ^Note 10 : Day 20: Sijo, post-surgery, joined Mohanlal on the weekend episode's stage to update the housemates about his medical procedure.
- ^Note 11 : Day 21: Mohanlal proposed adding one new member to the Power team. The Power team selected Arjun to join them.
- ^Note 12 : Day 31: Resmin was hospitalized because of a viral fever
- ^Note 13 : Day 34: Due to rule violations, Abhishek S was directly nominated for both week 7 and week 8, consequently disqualifying him from joining the power team for those weeks.
- ^Note 14 : Day 34: Sai Krishnan was directly nominated for week 7 due to the violation of rule
- ^Note 15 : Day 36: Following Abhishek S's restriction from the Power Team, Bigg Boss tasked the remaining room members with presenting themselves and persuading the Power Team to choose one of them.
- ^Note 16 : Day 41: Due to a violation of the rules, Sibin was directly nominated for eviction in week 7, resulting in his removal from the power team.
- ^Note 17 : Day 41: When being evicted from the show as requested by Mohanlal, Jaanmoni chose to pass on her Week 7 Power Team badge to Sreerekha.
- ^Note 18 : Day 42: Jasmin was directly nominated for Week 7 due to the violation of rules.
- ^Note 19 : Day 43: Pooja was hospitalized because of a back pain.
- ^Note 20 : Day 43: After Sibin's dismissal from the Power Team, Bigg Boss instructed the room members to choose participants for a task aimed at gaining access to the power room.
- ^Note 21 : Day 45: Sijo returned to the Bigg Boss house after surgery and treatment.
- ^Note 22 : Day 46: Bigg Boss announced that Pooja and Sibin had walked off from the show due to health issues.
- ^Note 23 : Day 50: Bigg Boss instructed the power team to remove two weak contestants from the power team. Consequently, Gabri and Rishi were removed after a discussion.
- ^Note 24 : Day 50: Bigg Boss arranged a debate task for self-nominated contestants to choose two members for the Power Team. Sai and Nandhana emerged as the chosen ones after the debate.
- ^Note 25 : Day 61: Sai discovered the Diamond of Princess Alexandra, which had been hidden by Sabu.
- ^Note 26 : Day 62: Due to rule violations, Resmin Bai was directly nominated for both week 10 and week 11.
- ^Note 27 : Day 63: The Power Room concept has come to an end. The room has been renamed 'People's Room,' and all its power has been removed.
- ^Note 28 : Day 64: With the Diamond in his possession, Sai was exempted from the eviction process. Furthermore, Bigg Boss assigned him and the Captain the responsibility of saving one contestant from the nomination list.
- ^Note 29 : Day 68: This week's voting lineup will be open until Sunday, and Mohanlal's episodes will be shot on Monday of week 11.
- ^Note 30 : Day 71: "Bigg Boss announced that because the next day was a special episode for Mohanlal's birthday, the 'Jail task' for week 10 was cancelled, and the nominees were given a punishment task instead.
- ^Note 31 : Day 73: Week 10 nomination list continued for week 11 as well.
- ^Note 32 : Day 82: Abhishek Sreekumar won the 'Ticket to Finale' task and directly entered to the finale week.
- ^Note 33 : Day 86: Sai accepted the MONEY BOX and walked away from the show.

== Ratings and viewership ==
Official ratings are taken from BARC India.
(TRP of the episodes telecasting in Asianet only)

Bigg Boss Malayalam Season 6 has indeed achieved the highest TRP (Television Rating Point) among all seasons aired in that time. It garnered a historic viewership of 2.7 crore viewers across television and digital platforms, making it the most-watched reality show on Malayalam television. The season saw a 35% increase in ratings compared to its predecessor, and viewership on Disney+ Hotstar surged by 55%. It is currently the second most watched season of Bigg Boss Malayalam after seventh season.

Grand Premiere		Grand Finale	
TRP Rating	Viewers(In Million's)	TRP Rating	Viewers(In Million's)
11.00 TRP	24.86	18.00 TRP	40.68

Weekly TRP Rating

Week 1	8.52 TRP	11 March - 15 March
Week 2	8.00 TRP	16 March - 22 March
Week 3	8.70 TRP	23 March - 29 March
Week 4	9.01 TRP	30 March - 5 April
Week 5	10.51 TRP	6 April - 12 April
Week 6	9.53 TRP	13 April - 19 April
Week 7	9.42 TRP	20 April - 26 April
Week 8	8.72 TRP	27 April - 3 May
Week 9	8.77 TRP	4 May - 10 May
Week 10	8.33 TRP	11 May - 17 May
Week 11	7.66 TRP	18 May - 24 May
Week 12	8.42 TRP	25 May - 31 May
Week 13	8.07 TRP	1 June - 7 June
Week 14	8.75 TRP	8 June - 14 June
Last Episode	9.34 TRP	15 June
