= Sudhinam =

- Directed by: Nissar
- Written by: Babu Janardhanan
- Produced by: Raju Mambara
- Starring: Jayaram; Madhavi; Suvarna Mathew; Oduvil Unnikrishnan
- Cinematography: Venugopal
- Edited by: G. Murali
- Music by: Rajamani
- Production company: Chethana Chithra Films
- Distributed by: Christ King Films
- Release date: 14 February 1994
- Running time: 2 hr
- Country: India
- Language: Malayalam

Sudhinam is a 1994 Malayalam- language drama film written by Babu Janardhanan and directed by Nissar(in his directorial debut). It stars Jayaram, Maadhavi, Sudheesh and Oduvil Unnikrishnan.

The film was A rated in Central board of film certificate

== Cast ==
- Jayaram as Sahadevan, School Teacher
- Madhavi as Vinodini, School Teacher
- Oduvil Unnikrishnan as Raghava Pothuval
- Sudheesh as Appu (T J Appukuttan Nair)
- Aranmula Ponnamma as Bhargavi Amma
- Zainuddin as Shekharan
- Swapna Ravi as Gouri Shekharan
- Mamukkoya as School Teacher
- Suvarna Mathew as Anila
- Mahesh as School Manager
- Sudhakaran Nair as Registrar
- Usharani as School Teacher
- Dileep as Raghu
- Kozhikode Narayanan Nair as Vinodini's father
- Priyanka as School Teacher

== Production ==
Dileep was supposed to play Sudheesh's role since Sudheesh did not show up to set initially. After Dileep got emotional, the director gave Dileep another character and gave him more lines.
