= Sathyabhamakkoru Premalekhanam =

- Directed by: Rajasenan
- Written by: Sreedevi
- Screenplay by: Rafeeq Seelat
- Produced by: M. X. Xavier
- Starring: Biju Menon; Prem Kumar
- Cinematography: Venugopal
- Edited by: K. P. Hariharaputhran
- Music by: C. Rajamani
- Production company: Vijaya Movies
- Release date: 26 August 1996
- Country: India
- Language: Malayalam

Sathyabhamakkoru Premalekhanam (transl. A love letter for Sathyabhama) is a 1996 Indian Malayalam-language film directed by Rajasenan, produced by M. X. Xavier, and starring Biju Menon, Prem Kumar, Chandni and Indrans. It was the debut film for actors Chandni Shaju and Paravoor Ramachandran. The film has a musical score by Rajamani. It was remade into Tamil as Sirithal Rasipen (2009).

== Cast ==
- Biju Menon as Sethumadhavan (Sethu)
- Chandni Shaju as Sathyabhama (Bhama)
- Paravoor Ramachandran as Chandramangalathu Rama Varma
- Indrans as Purshotthaman (Purushu)
- K. T. S. Padannayil as Moothakunnath Vikramadithya Varma
- Oduvil Unnikrishnan as Wariyar
- Maniyanpilla Raju as Sambhu, Aniyan Thamburan
- Zainuddin as Aniyan, Aniyan Thamburan
- Rajan P. Dev as Kovai Machan
- Prem Kumar as Bruce Lee Bhaskaran
- Mala Aravindan as Koduval Prakasan
- Vettukili Prakash as Karadi Narayanan
- Jose Pellissery as Vallyaveedan
- Kalabhavan Haneef as Vallyaveedan's right-hand
- Zeenath as Subhadra, Aniyan's wife
- Kanakalatha as Kochammini, Sambhu's wife
- Priyanka Anoop as Karadi Narayanan's wife
- T. R. Omana as Rama Varma's wife
- Khadeeja as Kuttimalu, Rama Varma's eldest sister
- Renuka as Savitri, Rama Varma's youngest sister
- Madhupal as Indrajith
- Spadikam George as Chandrasekara Varma
- K. R. Vatsala as Chandrasekara Varma's wife

== Soundtrack ==
The music was composed by Rajamani and the lyrics were written by I. S. Kundoor and S. Ramesan Nair.

No.	Song	Singers	Lyrics	Length (m:ss)
1	"Kalyaani Kalavaani"	Chorus		
2	"Maniveena Meetti"	K. S. Chithra, Biju Narayanan	I. S. Kundoor	
3	"Nirathingalo"	K. J. Yesudas	S. Ramesan Nair	
4	"Nirathingalo Manideepamo" (F)	K. S. Chithra	S. Ramesan Nair	
5	"Vellikkinnam Thullumbol"	Biju Narayanan	S. Ramesan Nair	
