= Saju Kodiyan =

Indian mimicry artist, comedian and actor

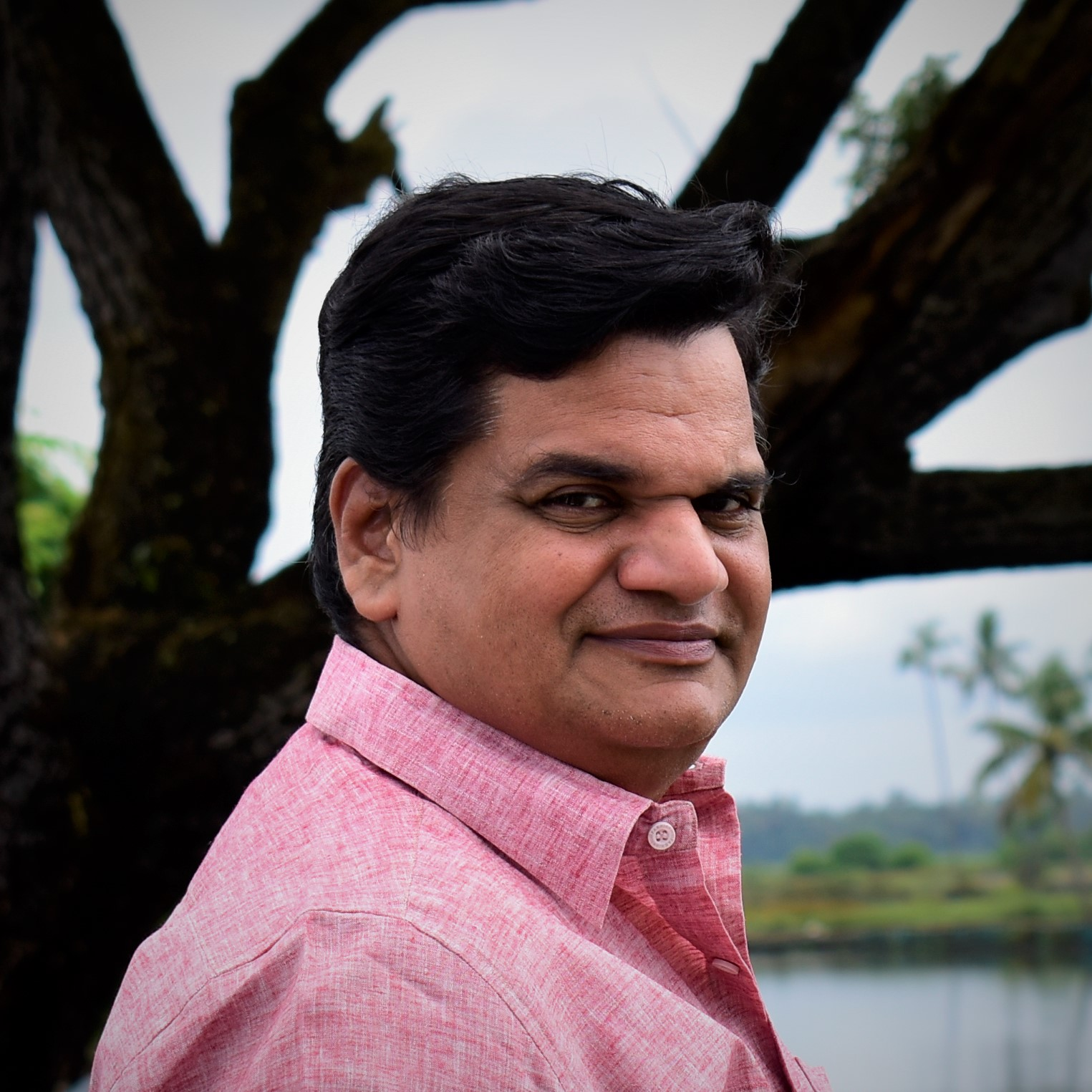
- Occupations: Mimicry artist; comedian; actor

Saju Kodiyan is an Indian mimicry artist, comedian and actor who works in the Malayalam Film Industry. He started his career as a mimicry artist and has acted in more than 20 movies.

== Career ==
Saju Kodiyan is famous for his role as Aminathatha in Harisree’s mimicry shows. Saju got the Aminathatha role by chance and his sound blended perfectly with the character. Saju has imitated the former Prime Minister of India, Atal Bihari Vajpayee and it became a super hit. He has also imitated Usha Uthup and still remembers the experience with Usha Didi. During one of their stage shows in Germany, Saju dressed up as Usha Didi and she suddenly meets him who has dressed up like her. She tells him that the makeup was not correct and she herself gives her bindi and ornaments to Saju and set him as a real Usha Uthup.

== TV shows ==
- Cinemala — Asianet
- Kadamattathu Kathanar — Asianet (serial)
- Culcutta Hospital — Surya TV (serial)
- Devimahathmyam — Asianet (serial)
- Cinemaa Chirimaa — Mazhavil Manorama
- Aaminatha Speaking — Surya Comedy
- Sathyam Shivam Sundharam — Amrita TV (serial)
- Kaiyil Alpam Karyam — Mazhavil Manorama
- Chayakkoppayile Kodumkattu — Mazhavil Manorama
- Im Laughing House — Kerala Vision
- Kudumbavilakku — Asianet (serial)
- Wife is Beautiful — Zee Keralam (serial)
- Geeta Govindam — Asianet (serial)
- Kumkumacheppu — Flowers TV (serial)
- Funs Upon a Time :Stand-up For Girls — Amrita TV
- Mazha Thorum Munpe — Asianet (serial)

As guest

- Badai Bungalow
- Onnum Onnum Moonu
- Comedy Super Night
- Cinema Company
- Rhythm
- Talk Talk

== Filmography ==
Year	Title	Role	Notes
2002	Onnaman	Ajayan	
2003	Thillana Thillana	Priest	
2004	Campus	Professor	Tamil film
2004	Vamanapuram Bus Route	Ayyappan	
2006	Kanaka Simhasanam	Avarachan	
2007	Black Cat	Mruthyumjayan Namboothiri	
2008	Novel		
2008	Parunthu	Panicker	
2009	Shudharil Shudhan		
2009	Pramukhan		
2009	Dr. Patient		
2009	Bharya Onnu Makkal Moonnu		
2010	Swantham Bharya Zindabad	Film Director	
2010	Chekavar	Party member Sundaran	
2011	Note Out		
2011	Lucky Jokers		
2011	Venicile Vyapari	Police Constable	
2012	101 Weddings	Kanakambaran	
2013	Sringaravelan	Narayanan Nair	
2014	Mylanchi Monchulla Veedu	Beerankutty	
2015	Two Countries	Chellappan	
2016	Welcome to Central Jail	Pushkaran	
2016	Swarna Kaduva	Mollykutty's brother	
2017	Sherlock Toms	Fr. Stephen Kunnummel	
2019	Aakasha Ganga 2	Bus Driver	
2024	Peppatty	Priest	

=== Writer ===
- Lucky Jokers
