= Nissar (director) =

Indian film director in Malayalam cinema (1960-2025)

- Born: 1960; Thiruvananthapuram, India
- Died: 18 August 2025 (aged 65); Kottayam, India
- Occupation: Director
- Years active: 1994–2025

Nissar (1960 – 18 August 2025) was an Indian film director in Malayalam cinema. Nissar died on 18 August 2025, at the age of 65. He had been undergoing treatment for lung and liver related ailments.

== Filmography ==
Year	Film	Notes
1994	Sudhinam	Debut film
1995	Three Men Army	
1995	Achan Rajavu Appan Jethavu	
1996	Malayaalamaasam Chingam Onninu	
1996	Padanayakan	
1996	Nandagopaalante Kusruthikal	
1997	Newspaper Boy	
1997	Adukkala Rahasyam Angaadi Paattu	
1998	Chenapparambile Aanakkariyam	
1998	British Market	
1999	Captain	
1999	Jananaayakan	
1999	Auto Brothers	
2000	Mera Naam Joker	
2001	Aparanmaar Nagarathil	
2001	Goa	
2001	Dupe Dupe Dupe	
2002	Kayamkulam Kanaran	
2002	Jagathy Jagadeesh in Town	
2004	Thalamelam	
2008	Bullet	
2017	Dance Dance	
2017	6 Viralukal	
2018	Two Days	
2018	Laughing Apartment Near Girinagar	
2020	Colours	
2023	Two Men Army	
