= Silayugathile Sthreekal =

- Directed by: RS Suresh
- Release date: 12 May 1996
- Country: India
- Language: Malayalam

Silayugathile Sthreekal is a 1996 Indian Malayalam film, directed by RS Suresh.
