= K. T. S. Padannayil =

Indian theatre artist and film actor (1933–2021)

- Born: Kochuparambil Thai Subramanian Padannayil; 1933; Thrippunithura, Kochi, British Raj
- Died: 22 July 2021 (aged 88); Thrippunithura, Kochi, India
- Occupation: Film actor
- Years active: 1990–2021
- Spouse: Ramani (1972 – 2021)
- Children: 3 sons, 1 daughter

Kochuparambil Thai Subramanian Padannayil (1933 – 22 July 2021) was an Indian theatre artist and film actor who worked predominantly in Malayalam film industry. He began his acting career at the age of 21 as a theatre artist and made his film debut in 1995 through Rajasenan's comedy film Aniyan Bava Chetan Bava.

Padannayil acted in more than 60 movies in various supporting and comic roles. Known for his impeccable comic timing, he is mostly remembered for his comic roles in movies such as Sreekrishnapurathe Nakshatrathilakkam, Vrudhanmare Sookshikkuka and Vaamanapuram Bus Route. He also acted in several television comedy serials.

== Biography ==
Padannayil was born as the youngest of six children to Kochupadannayil Thai and Maani at Thekkumbhagam, Thrippunithura, Kochi in 1933. He had three brothers, Murukan, Raghavan and Shivan and two sisters, Lalitha and Lathika. He studied at Saraswathi Vilasam School, Tripunithura. He discontinued studies after sixth class due to financial difficulties. He was a theatre artist before becoming a cinema artist. He first acted in and directed amateur drama Vivaha Dallal, at Trippunithura Khadibhavan's Amber charkha spinning mill's annual day celebration. He also trained youngsters of the Children's Society at Kannankulangara. He acted on thousands of stages within 40 years. He performed at different drama troupes like Jayabharath Nithakalalaya, Chenagassery Geetha, Vaikom Malavika, Kollam Tuna and Attingal Padmasree. In a career spanning around 25 years he acted in more than 60 films and starred in more than one hundred television comedy serials.

He married Ramani in 1972. The couple had three sons, Syam, Sannan, Saljan and a daughter, Swapna. He resided at Kochi with his son, Syam. He made his debut in the movie Aniyan Bava Chetan Bava in 1995.

== Death ==
Padannayil died on 22 July 2021 at his residence in Tripunithura after suffering from age-related issues. He is survived by his four children and many grandchildren. His wife predeceased him.

== Partial filmography ==
- Vidhi (2021)
- Minnal Murali (2021)
- One (2021)
- Alice in Panchalinadu (2021)
- Kalakaran (2021)
- Laughing Apartment Near Girinagar (2018)
- Rakshadhikari Baiju Oppu (2017)
- Oru Muthassi Gadha (2016)
- King Liar (2016 film)
- Amar Akbar Anthony (2015)
- Kunjiramayanam (2015)
- Avarude Veedu (2014)
- Malayalanaadu (2013)
- Swaasam (2013)
- Good Idea (2013)
- Maharaja Talkies (2011)
- Brahmaasthram (2010)
- Oru Small Family (2010)
- Annarakkannanum Thannalayathu (2010)
- Gulumaal: The Escape (2009)
- Black Dhaliya (2009)
- Sanmanasullavan Appukuttan (2009)
- Malabar Wedding (2008)
- Aakasham (2007)
- Kanninum Kannadikkum (2004) as Mooppan
- Vaamanapuram Bus Route (2004)
- Sahodaran Sahadevan (2003)
- Sraavu (2001)
- Ninneyum Thedi (2001)
- Megasandesam (2001)
- Akashathile Paravakal (2001)
- Ente Priyappetta Muthuvinu (2000)
- Ee Mazha Thenmazha (2000)
- Varnakkaazhchakal (2000)
- Manassil Oru Manjuthulli (2000)
- The Godman (1999)
- Independence (1999)
- Onnaamvattam Kandappol (1999) as Perumal sir
- My dear Karadi (1999)
- Sreekrishnapurathu Nakshathrathilakkam (1998)
- Manthrikumaaran (1998)
- Ayushman Bava (1998)
- Amma Ammayiamma (1998)
- Kadhaanaayakan (1997)
- Kottapurathe Koottukudumbam (1997)
- Newspaper Boy (1997)
- Kalyanapittennu (1997)
- Five Star Hospital (1997)
- Dilliwaala Raajakumaaran (1996)
- Sathyabhamakkoru Premalekhanam (1996)
- Hitlist (1996)
- Harbour (1996) as Vareechan
- Swapna Lokathe Balabhaskaran (1996)
- Vridhanmaare Sookshikkuka (1995)
- Aniyan Bava Chetan Bava (1995) (debut film)
- Kaakkaykkum Poochaykkum Kalyaanam (1995)
- Aadyathe Kanmani (1995)
- Keerthanam (1995) as Sulthan
- Kalamasseriyil Kalyanayogam (1995)
- Three Men Army (1995)
- Agrajan (1995)

== Television ==
- Thenum Vayambum (Surya TV)
- Kuttikale oru Kaliparayam (kochu TV)
- Thatteem Mutteem (Mazhavil Manorama)
- Pakida Pakida Pambaram (Doordharshan)
- Sanmassullavarkku Samadhanam (Asianet)
