= Malayaalamaasam Chingam Onninu =

Malayala Masom Chingam Onnu
- Directed by: Nissar
- Written by: A. R. Mukesh
- Produced by: Khader Nazir, Pawankumar, Ajith
- Starring: Prem Kumar; Dileep; Biju Menon; Harisri Ashokan; Sainedeen; Rajan P. Dev; Rudra; Shabnam; Kalpana; Philomina, etc.
- Cinematography: Venugopal
- Edited by: G. Murali
- Music by: Raveendran
- Production companies: Ankith & Jisna Movies
- Distributed by: Ankith & Jisna Movies
- Release date: 9 November 1996
- Country: India
- Language: Malayalam

Malayala Masom Chingam Onnu (transl. Malayalam Calendar: first of Chingam) is a 1996 Indian Malayalam-language film directed and produced by Nissar. The film stars Prem Kumar, Dileep, Biju Menon and Kalpana in the lead roles. The film has musical score by Raveendran.

== Plot ==
The Plot revolves around Appu, his wife Renuka, Renuka's friend Dr. Prasad. Appu is a scrap dealer for whom Kochuraman works. Renuka wants her husband to dress in a modern and stylish way according to new trends while Appu is the exact opposite. Preman is the neighbor of Appu and he is a photographer. Despite being a womanizer, he is married to Rukmini/Rukku who has stammering. Rukmini's father is skeptical at first on his daughter's marriage to a womanizer but marries her to Preman thinking that her daughter would not get a good groom since she has stammering. One day Dr. Prasad unexpectedly pays a visit to Renuka while Appu is at work. Preman parks his car in Appu's house due to lack of availability of parking space. On the day Prasad pays a visit, Preman enters to get his car and Renuka introduces Preman as her husband to Dr. Prasad. Preman plays along and when Prasad notices a picture of Renuka and Appu, Preman lies that Appu is her brother. Appu is unknown of these events. As the lie gets repeated more than once, Preman blackmails Renuka for sexual favours threatening to expose her lie. Whilst these, the pregnant Rukmini suffers a miscarriage which shatters Preman and he decides to turn a new leaf. Renuka attempts suicide on blackmail of Preman but survives. Riddled by fate, Preman leaves his womanizing tendencies turning into a faithful husband and Renuka leaves her attempt for modernizing her husband turning into a faithful wife.

== Cast ==
- Prem Kumar as Appu
- Dileep as Preman, The main Antagonist
- Rudra as Renuka, Appu's wife
- Biju Menon as Dr. Prasad
- A. C. Zainuddin as Shersaab
- Kalpana as Rukmini/Rukku preman's wife
- Manu Raj
- Rajan P. Dev
- Harishree Ashokan as Kochuraman
- Sagar Shiyas as Kadavul
- Philomina

== Soundtrack ==
The music was composed by Raveendran and the lyrics were written by Gireesh Puthenchery.

No.	Song	Singers	Lyrics	Length (m:ss)
1	"Aakaasham"	K. G. Markose	Gireesh Puthenchery	
2	"Aakaasham" (F)	K. S. Chithra	Gireesh Puthenchery	
3	"Aaro Thinkathidambo" (D)	K. J. Yesudas, Sindhu Premkumar	Gireesh Puthenchery	
4	"Aaro Thinklathidambo"	K. J. Yesudas	Gireesh Puthenchery	
5	"Kaalam Kalikaalam"	Ambili, Krishnachandran, Natesh Shankar	Gireesh Puthenchery	
6	"Kunjikkuyil"	Biju Narayanan	Gireesh Puthenchery	
7	"Vilolayaay"	K. J. Yesudas	Gireesh Puthenchery	
