= Prem Kumar (Malayalam actor) =

Indian actor (Malayalam)

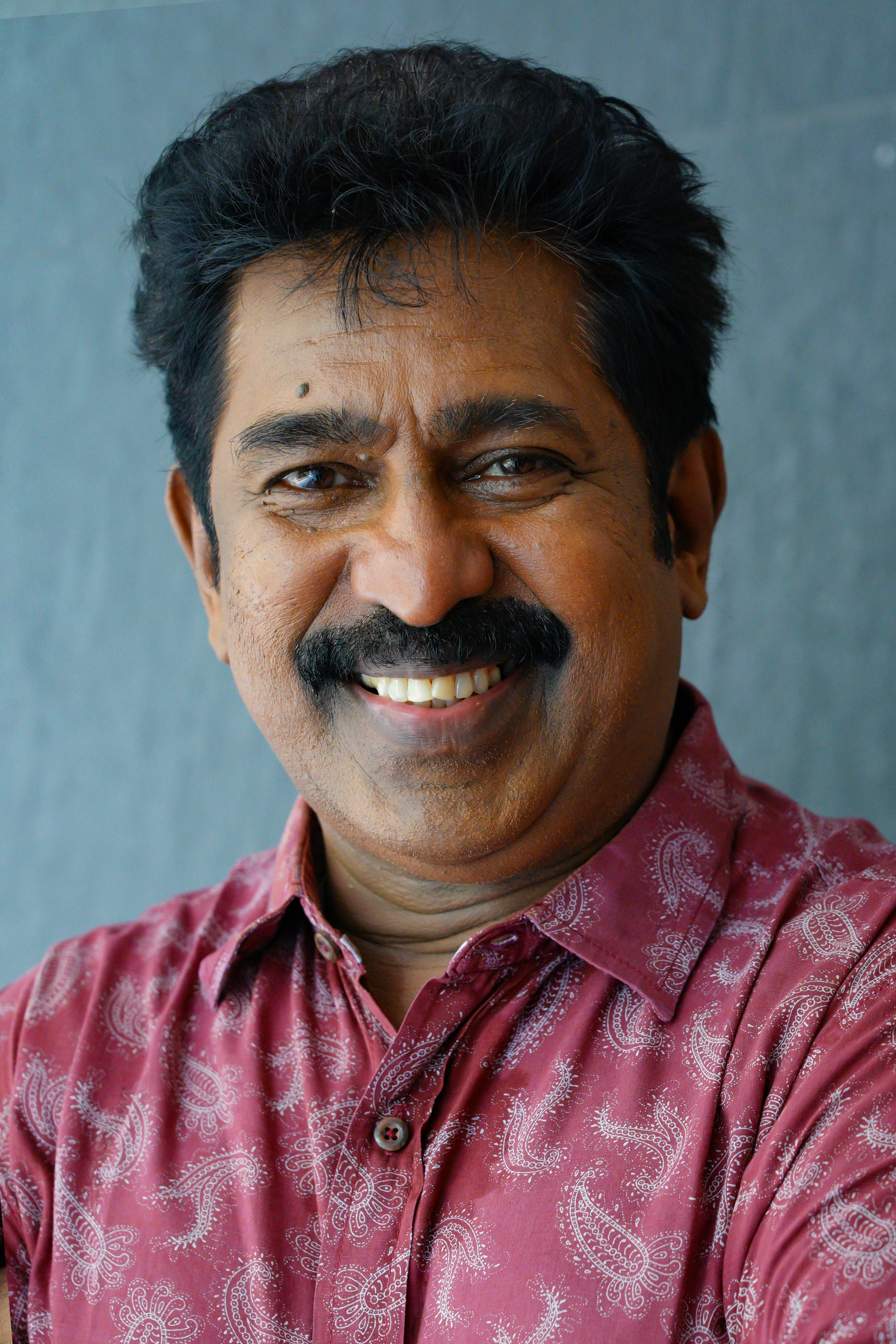
- Prem Kumar in 2022
- Born: 12 September 1967 (age 59); Thiruvananthapuram, Kerala, India
- Education: St. Xavier's College, Thumba; Sree Narayana College, Chempazhanthy
- Occupation: Actor
- Spouse: Jisha (m. 2001)
- Children: Jameema
- Parents: James Samuel; Jayakumari

Prem Kumar is an Indian actor known for his roles in Malayalam films. He has acted in more than 100 films, and played lead roles in 18 films. He was the former Chairman of Kerala State Chalachitra Academy.

== Personal life and education ==
Prem Kumar was born to Premsadan Samuel and Jayakumari in Kazhakoottam, Thiruvananthapuram district, Kerala. Ajith Kumar and Prasanna Kumar are his siblings. He received his primary education from Kazhakoottam Govt U.P School, Muslim Boys High School, Kaniyapuram and St. Xavier's College, Thumba. He obtained a degree in Psychology from Sree Narayana College, Chempazhanthy.

He married Jisha on 12 July 2001. They have a daughter named Jameema.

== Awards ==
- 1993 Kerala State Television Award for Best Actor for a telefilm Lambo in Doordarshan.
- Prem Nazir Award in March 2019

== Filmography ==
Year	Title	Role	Notes
1991	Arangu	Pappan Govindan	
1991	Sundhari Kakka	Johnson	
1991	Oru Prathyeka Ariyippu		
1992	Johnnie Walker	Mansoor	
1992	Pandu Pandoru Rajakumari	Pushpan	
1992	Oru Kochu Bhoomikulukkam	Snake Charmer	
1992	Cheppadividya	Thomachan	
1993	Aayirappara	Yasodharan	
1993	Kulapathy	Sakkeer	
1993	Padaleeputhram	Sakkeer	
1993	Ammayane Sathyam	Sreeni	
1993	Gandharvam	Preman	
1993	Aalavattam	Govindankutty	
1993	Butterflies	MP Dineshan	
1993	Kalippattam	Lambodharan	
1994	Malappuram Haji Mahanaya Joji	Havildar Sukumaran	
1994	Sainyam	Ramu	
1994	Gothram	Manikandan	
1994	Bhaagyavaan	Jose	
1994	Santhanagopalam		
1994	Vardhakya Puranam	Parimalan	
1995	Puthukkottayile Puthumanavalan	Satheesh Cochin	
1995	Kakkakkum Poochakkum Kalyanam	Aravindakshan	
1995	Peter Scott	SI Shelvaraj	
1995	Street	Pradeep	
1995	Achan Rajavu Appan Jethavu	Thomaskutty	
1995	Parvathy Parinayam	Premachandran	
1995	Minnaminuginum Minnukettu	S.I. Pradeep	
1995	Kokkarakko	Adv. Radhakrishnan	
1995	Keerthanam		
1995	Aniyan Bava Chetan Bava	Sundaran	
1995	Kalamasseriyil Kalyanayogam	Prakashan	
1995	Aadyathe Kanmani	Urumees	
1995	Sundari Neeyum Sundaran Njanum		
1995	Three Men Army	Benny Kurien	
1995	Thumboli Kadappuram	Chalappan	
1996	Excuse Me Ethu Collegila		
1996	Sathyabhamakkoru Premalekhanam	Bruce lee Bhaskaran	
1996	Kireedamillatha Rajakkanmar	Tender Sarasan	
1996	Malayaalamaasam Chingam Onninu	Appu	
1996	Kaathil Oru Kinnaram	Mahesh	
1996	Manthrika Kuthira		
1996	Kavadam		Unreleased
1996	Saamoohyapaadam	Raghuraman	
1996	Mookkilla Rajyathu Murimookkan Rajavu	Dasappan	
1997	Hitler Brothers	S.I. Sundaran	
1997	Killikurushiyile Kudumba Mela	Unnikrishnan	
1997	Gajaraja Manthram	Sankarankutty	
1997	Snehasindooram		
1997	Poothumbiyum Poovalanmarum	Pavithran	
1997	Kalyana Unnikal	Bosco	
1997	Poonilamazha	Shakthi Varma	
1997	Ikkareyanente Manasam	Kuttiraman	
1998	Manthri Kochamma	Jayan	
1998	Mayajalam	Harischandran	
1999	Charlie Chaplin	Charlie	
1999	Tokyo Nagarathile Viseshangal	Sub Inspector	
1999	American Ammayi	Devan	
1999	James Bond	Unnithan	
1999	My Dear Karadi	Tarzan Kittunni	
2000	Desam	Jayakrishnan	
2002	Snehithan	Vivekan	
2003	OK Chacko Cochin Mumbai		
2003	Mr. Brahmachari	Varadappan	
2004	Koottu	W. J. Napoleon	
2004	Thalamelam	C.I Richard SI	
2004	Black	Unni	
2005	Achante Ponnumakkal		
2009	Kadha, Samvidhanam Kunchakko	Dr. Mathew Kurian	
2009	Angel John	Fireman	
2010	Paattinte Palazhy		
2010	Advocate Lakshmanan – Ladies Only	Rajappan	
2010	Fiddle		
2011	Teja Bhai & Family	Hari Prasad	
2011	Sundarimukku		
2011	Mohabbath		
2012	Chattakaari	Rahim	
2013	Shutter	S.I. Subhashchandran	
2013	Crocodile Love Story	S.I. Vishwambharan	
2013	Black Ticket	Mammali	
2014	Malayalakara Residency		
2014	Monayi Angane Aanayi	R.K.G.	
2014	Vasanthathinte Kanal Vazhikalil		
2014	Nagara Varidhi Naduvil Njan	Sub Inspector	
2015	She Taxi	Nambiar	
2016	Mudhugauv	Chief Minister	
2017	Honey Bee 2: Celebrations	Adv. Marcos	
2017	Sakhavu	Party Secretary	
2018	Panchavarnathatha	S.I. K.O. Rangan	
2018	Aravindante Athidhikal	Venu	
2019	Kuttymama		
2019	Pattabhiraman	ASI Sandeep Kumar	
2019	Mohabbathin Kunjabdulla	Auto Rickshaw Driver	
2019	Mr. Pavanayi 99.99		
2019	Theerumanam		
2019	Varthakal Ithuvare		
2020	Uriyadi	Home Minister	
2021	One	P Madhu, MLA Opposition	
2021	Oru Thathvika Avalokanam	Delhi Underworld Leader	
2022	Gold	Anto Chettan	
2022	Kallan D'Souza	Babu	
2022	Aaraattu	Sathyabalan	
2023	Kallanum Bhagavathiyum	SI Sudheendran ||	
2023	Maheshum Marutiyum	Sakhavu	
2024	CID Ramachandran Retd. SI	Vasundaran	
2025	Aabhyanthara Kuttavaali		
2025	Adinaasam Vellapokkam	Chief Inspector	

== Television ==
- Lambo (Doordarshan)
- Ente Manasaputhri (Asianet)
- Scooter (Doordarshan)
- Comedy Ulsavam (Flowers TV)
- O Henry Stories (Doordarshan Malayalam)
- Mechilpurangal (Doordarshan)
