= SAAP =

SAAP may refer to:

- Supported Accommodation Assistance Program (SAAP)
- General Justo José de Urquiza Airport
- Service as a product
- Society for the Advancement of American Philosophy - see American philosophy
- Software as a Platform - see Computing platform
- Software as a Product - see Software product management
- Sean's Accepted Accounting Principles - see GAAP
- Selective aortic arch perfusion
