= V. M. Muralidharan =

Former Chairman of Ethiraj College for Women

- Born: 29 December 1959 (age 66); Chennai, India
- Education: College of Engineering, Guindy
- Spouse: Kalpana Muralidharan
- Children: 2
- Awards: Lifetime Achievement Award; Distinguished Alumnus Award; Edupreneur Award; Eminent Educationist Award; Vocational Excellence Award; Literary Excellence Award

Vellore Madhavan Muralidharan, popularly known as Mike Muralidharan, (born 29 December 1959) is an Indian educationist and IT industry veteran. He is the Chairman of Ethiraj College for Women, the Chief Operating Officer of Bahwan CyberTek Group and the Chairman of ALERT NGO. He is a distinguished alumnus of the College of Engineering, Guindy.

He is also an Executive Committee Member at Southern Indian Chamber of Commerce and Industry, Panel Member on the Education Panel, TNSC at FICCI, Charter Member at TiE Chennai, Member at The Chennai Angels, and Charter Member on the Concordia India Advisory Board of Concordia College (New York).

== Early life and education ==
He went to the College of Engineering, Guindy.

== Career ==
He was later the Director & President of Precision Techserve. Since 2010, he has been the Chief Operating Officer of Bahwan CyberTek Group, a global software group.

As the Chairman of Ethiraj College Trust, he heads the Ethiraj College for Women, Chennai and the Ethiraj Matriculation Higher Secondary School, Vellore. Earlier, he served as the Chairman of Ethiraj College Trust from 2013 to 2019. Muralidharan, great grandnephew of the founder and first chairman V. L. Ethiraj, became the first member from the founder's family to head the Trust. Prior to being elected as the Chairman in 2013, he served as the Financial Trustee.

He is also the Chairman of ALERT NGO, a member of The Chennai Angels, a Charter Member at TiE Chennai.

== Awards and honours ==
- 2015 - "Edupreneur Award" by Raindropss for his initiatives, commitments, excellence and significant contributions in the field of education.
- 2016 - "Eminent Educationist Award" at the Indo-American Education Summit 2016 in recognition of his excellence in the field of Educational Leadership.
- 2017 - "Vocational Excellence Award" by Rotary Club of Chennai Velachery Rotary International Dist. 3230 in recognition and appreciation of his outstanding contributions to the cause of Women's Literacy.
- 2018 - "Distinguished Alumnus Award" by the Alumni Association College of Engineering, Guindy in recognition of his outstanding service to India and elsewhere in the world in the field of Education and Information Technology.
