= Subur Parthasarathy =

Indian educator and legislator (1911–1966)

- Born: Subur Mugaseth; 1911; Calicut
- Died: 10 October 1966 (aged 54–55); New York
- Other name: Subur Parthasarathi
- Occupations: Educator, college administrator
- Spouse: Parthasarathy

Subur Parthasarathy (1911 – 10 October 1966), born Subur Mugaseth, was an Indian educator and legislator. She was the first principal at Ethiraj College for Women, and served in the upper house of the Indian Parliament from 1960 to 1966.

== Early life ==
Subur Mugaseth was born in Calicut, the daughter of Khodadad Mugaseth, into a family prominent in the city's Parsi community. Her only brother died in World War II. She attended the University of Madras and University of Oxford, and earned a master's degree in English, and completed a doctorate in 1936.

== Career ==
Parthasarathy taught English at Queen Mary's College in Madras. She was the first principal of Ethiraj College for Women, serving from 1948 to 1952. She was succeeded in the principalship by Mona Hensman. In 1952, she traveled in the United States studying universities and colleges. Parthasarathy was elected to the Rajya Sabha from 1960 to 1966.

== Personal life ==
In 1939, Subur Mugaseth married journalist and diplomat Gopalaswami Parthasarathy, after they met at Oxford. They had a son, Ashok Parthasarathi (1940–2019) who followed his parents into government work and academia. She died from heart and kidney ailments in New York, in 1966, while her husband was representing India at the United Nations.

Actor and playwright Girish Karnad was her niece's husband; and journalist Raghu Karnad is her grand-nephew.
