= Panjagni =

Panjagni or Panchagni may refer to:

- Panchagni, a 1986 Indian Malayalam-language crime drama film by Hariharan
- Panchagni (TV series), a 2024 Indian Malayalam-language TV series on Flowers TV
