= Gopalaswami Parthasarathy (diplomat) =

Indian journalist and diplomat (1912–1995)

Gopalaswami Parthasarathi

Permanent Representative of India to the United Nations
- In office August 1965 – December 1968
- Preceded by: B. N. Chakrvarthy
- Succeeded by: Samar Sen

President of the United Nations Security Council
- In office September 1967 – October 1967

Personal details
- Born: 7 July 1912 Madras, Madras Presidency British India
- Died: 1 August 1995 (aged 83) New Delhi, India
- Occupation: journalist, educationist, diplomat

Gopalaswami Parthasarathi (7 July 1912 – 1 August 1995), often known simply as GP, was an Indian journalist, educationist, and diplomat who served as Permanent Representative to the United Nations from August 1965 to December 1968.

He was the son of N. Gopalaswami Ayyangar, a civil servant in the Madras Presidency who later became Diwan Bahadur of Kashmir, a member of the Constituent Assembly, and a minister in the first cabinet of Prime Minister Jawaharlal Nehru.

== Early life and education ==
Parthasarathi was the youngest of four children, and the only son of Komalam and Gopalaswami Ayyangar. He studied in the P.S. High School, Madras, and attended Presidency College, Madras, graduating with a Bachelor honours degree in economics in 1932. He then went to Wadham College, Oxford and obtained a Master of Arts Honours degree in modern history, in 1934.

== Sportsman ==
G.P. was a skilled sportsman and cricketer and participated in Ranji Trophy tournaments for many years. A versatile cricket player, and an excellent legspin googly bowler, he played 11 matches for Madras between 1936 and 1943, including a match against Tennyson's XI in 1937–38. He was a member of the Madras Cricket Association and served as the vice president. Under his captaincy, the Mylapore Recreation Club won the championship two consecutive years. After his retirement he served as a State cricket team selector and was involved in the development of the Tamil Nadu Cricket Association. He was also an excellent Hockey player and played center-half in his college days. He also played collegiate level tennis. At Oxford, he was a double university blue in cricket and hockey.

== Personal life ==
While he was a student in Madras (now Chennai), G. P. met Subur Mugaseth, a student of English literature belonging to the Parsi community. They met later again in England and got married in 1939. Subur was a teacher of English at the Queen Mary's College in Madras. She later became the First Principal of the Ethiraj College for Women in Madras from 1948 to 1949 & 1950-1952 and was nominated to the Rajya Sabha in 1961. Their only son, Ashok Parthasarathi, was born in 1940. Ashok (1940–2019), like his father, served under Indira Gandhi as her science and technology advisor.

== Journalist ==
G.P. was a renowned journalist. After passing the Barrister of Law examinations in 1936, he joined The Times of London as an apprentice. Soon after, he returned to India and began his journalism career as an editorial staff member of The Hindu at a time when the newspaper began to expand coverage on international affairs. Several articles on foreign affairs that appeared to be anonymous have been attributed to his authorship. In 1949, G.P. was appointed the first representative of the Press Trust of India in London. In 1952 he returned to Bombay as chief editor of the Press Trust of India until 1954 and was a member of its board of directors until 1975. In 1980, the Government of India constituted a 14-member advisory committee for restructuring the media organizations, formulating policies, and promoting innovative programming in order to enrich cultural identity and enhance national integration. G. Parthasarathi was appointed chairman of this committee. His ties with journalism strengthened even during the height of his diplomatic career and continued throughout his life.

== Diplomatic career ==
Following a successful career as a journalist, G. Parthasarathi was pitchforked into the world of politics by Jawaharlal Nehru in 1954. Nehru recognized his talents in diplomacy and requested his help in Indo-China. G.P resigned from his post in the PTI and relocated to Indo-China for 3 years. He was the government's man for resolving sticky issues and played a significant role in India's foreign relations. He served as the Chief Commissioner of the International Control Commission set up to monitor the Geneva Accords, first in Cambodia and then in Vietnam. He was a distinguished diplomat whose career spanned six decades involving challenging political assignments especially in war-stricken Cambodia and Vietnam. His next posting was Indian Ambassador in Indonesia in January 1957 following which he was posted to Peking in 1958 as Indian Ambassador to China and Mongolia for a period of 3 years. He was appointed High Commissioner to Pakistan in 1962. In September 1965, G.P was appointed Permanent Ambassador of India to the United Nations until 1969. During his assignment in New York, he served as chairman of the United Nations Committee on Contributions in 1966, a ten-member Committee which advised the General Assembly on apportionment of the U.N. expenditure among members and their scale of assessments. He served as India's Permanent Delegate to the United Nations Security Council in 1967 and 1968. He was President of the Security Council in 1967 and chairman of the Security Council Sanctions Committee on Rhodesia from September to December 1968. Even after his return to India in 1969, he continued to be involved with the United Nations serving first as trustee of the United Nations Institute for Training and Research (UNITAR) from 1970 to 1979, and then as an elected member of the executive board of UNESCO for four years from 1972 to 1976. As chairman of the Indo-US Sub-Commission on Education, Culture and Science, and the Indo-Soviet Joint Commission on Social Sciences, he contributed substantially to programs in education, science, culture, media, and communication. He also served as a member of the Scientific Council of the Stockholm International Peace Research Institute (SIPRI).

G.P. dealt with international and domestic problems. He was the architect of the Indira-Sheikh Accord under which Sheikh Abdullah returned to power in 1975. G.P, arguing on behalf of Indira Gandhi, persuaded Beg, the representative of Sheikh Abdullah, that Kashmir was an integral part of India. The accord covered many salient issues such as the applicability of Article 370 to Jammu and Kashmir and the extension of Central Laws to the State. Above all, it ruled out plebiscite in Kashmir which was G.P's fundamental achievement. In 1982, he led a delegation of social scientists to Peking and began talks to settle the dispute with China on security and border issues. His political assignments included on-going negotiations with Sri Lanka and Nepal. He tried to resolve the Sinhalese-Tamil conflict in Sri Lanka in 1983-84 when Indira Gandhi appointed him as her personal envoy to Sri Lanka. Upon discussions with the leaders of the Tamil United Liberation Front (TULF), he prepared a document which, at that time, was the basis for all future negotiations with Sri Lanka. His twin objectives were to maintain the unity, sovereignty and integrity of the island and, at the same time, guarantee the safety, security, economic and social well-being of the Tamil population in the northern and eastern provinces. Indira Gandhi's untimely death prevented a peaceful resolution to the conflict, but G.P laid the foundations to a friendly compromise. He continued his involvement in the ethnic conflict with Sri Lanka even during Rajiv Gandhi's reign. He played a crucial role in the signing of the Mizo Accord on 30 June 1986 thereby ending insurgency in the northeast state of Mizoram. He developed trust with the Mizo National Front leader, Laldenga, and convinced him to reject the path of violence. The accord has held to this day as Mizoram remains one of the most peaceful and stable states in the northeast of India. Prime Minister Indira Gandhi considered G.P her principal foreign policy adviser and he continued to hold this position even during Rajiv Gandhi's tenure as prime minister. He established a strong foothold with the Reagan and Thatcher administrations and with developing countries like Yugoslavia and Indonesia. In August 1984, he was appointed chairman of the Policy Planning Committee in the Ministry of External Affairs with the rank of Cabinet Minister to assist and advise the prime minister, Indira Gandhi, in the country's foreign relations. He had previously served in this position during 1975–77 with the rank of Minister of State, but during his reappointment, he functioned as a de facto Foreign Minister referring only high policy matters to the prime minister.

== Educationist ==
G.P. made several contributions to higher education. Prime Minister Indira Gandhi requested G.P. to serve as the first vice-chancellor of the Jawaharlal Nehru University, Delhi which opened in 1969, a position he held for five years. He established the foundation for the intellectual, academic and physical quality of the institution. JNU with its multi-disciplinary programs focusing on basic and applied sciences, the social sciences, and the humanities was India's first institution of its kind. He also founded the UN University of Japan and was a member of its council.

G.P was comfortable dealing with student radicalism. Largely due to his efforts, JNU was the first university in India to establish a highly participative, broad-based and democratic student union thus leading to a dynamic student movement on its campus. G.P accepted the student union's demand for a democratic admission policy thereby enabling students of diverse socio-economic backgrounds to enter the university. G.P was appointed chairman of the Indian Council of Social Science Research (ICSSR) in August 1980 during Indira Gandhi's tenure as prime minister. He oversaw a chain of social science research institutions across the country and raised the level of academics. He founded the Indian Institute of Mass Communication (IIMC) and elevated the status of mass communication to a social science. G.P was also a writer and edited the five-volume Jawaharlal Nehru's Letters to chief ministers. and was co-editor of the Nehru Centenary Volume and the Indira Gandhi Commemorative Volume G.P. died in New Delhi on 1 August 1995 at the age of 83.
