= Dhivya =

Dhivya may refer to:

== Places ==
- Dhivya Matriculation Higher Secondary School, established in 1992 in Chetpet, Thiruvannamalai District, Tamil Nadu, India
- Dhivya College of Education, established in 2005 in Chetpet, Thiruvannamalai District, Tamil Nadu, India
- Dhivya Polytechnic College, established in 2008 in Chetpet, Thiruvannamalai District, Tamil Nadu, India

== People ==
- Dhivya Suryadevara, CFO of General Motors
