= Sreethu Krishnan =

Indian actress (born 1999)

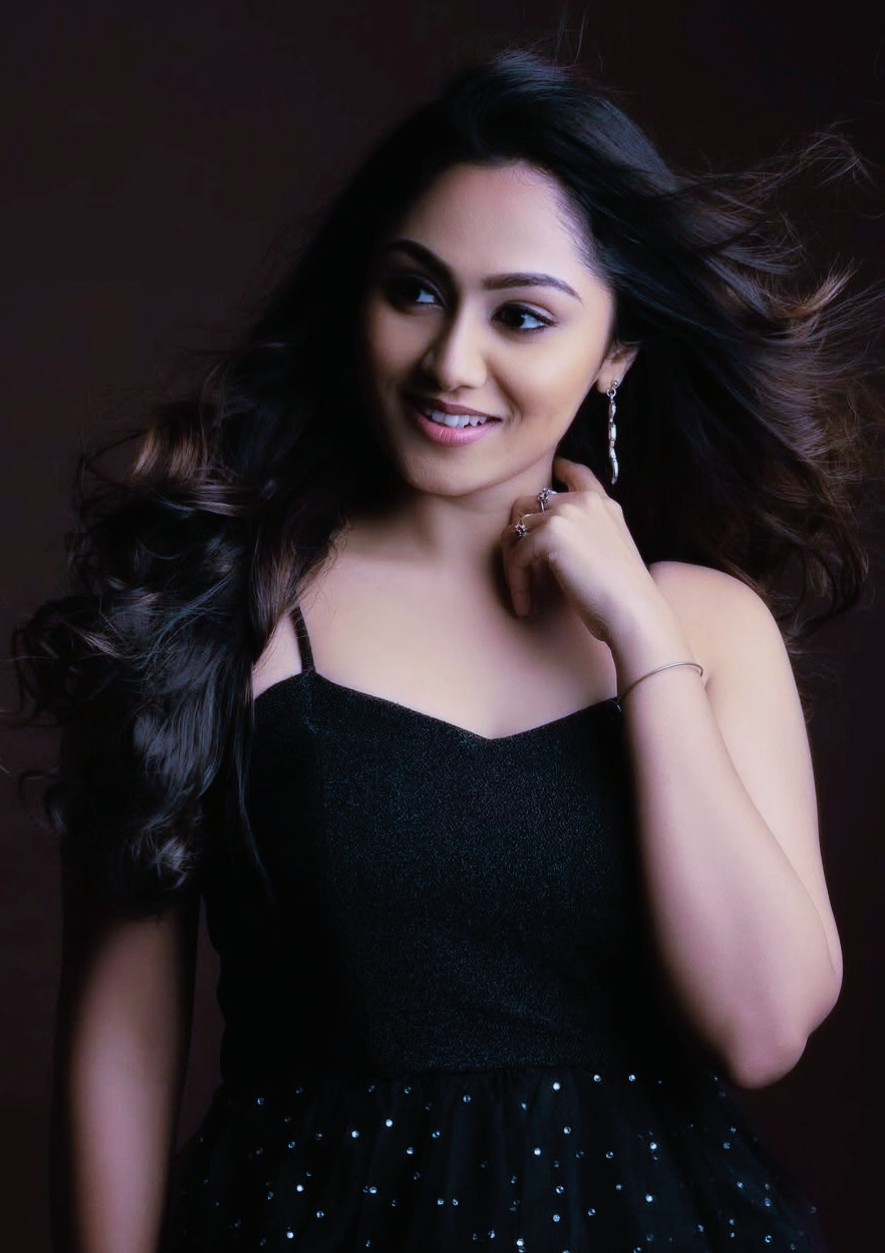
- Born: 2 May 1999 (age 27); Chennai, Tamil Nadu, India
- Other name: Sreethu Nair
- Education: Ethiraj College for Women, Chennai
- Occupation: Actress･ Dancer･ Model
- Years active: 2012 – present
- Height: 5 ft 5 in (165 cm)

Sreethu Krishnan (born 2 May 1999), is an Indian actress who primarily works in Tamil and Malayalam television while also appearing in films. She made her acting debut in 7C TV series on Vijay TV. She is best known for her roles as Indira in Aayutha Ezhuthu and Aleena Peter in Ammayariyathe. She also appeared in Bigg Boss (Malayalam TV series) season 6.

== Early life and education ==
Sreethu Krishnan was born and raised in Chennai, Tamil Nadu. Her family originates from Palakkad, Kerala.

She completed her schooling at St. Francis Xavier Anglo-Indian Higher Secondary School in Chennai. She holds a Bachelor of Arts degree in Economics and later pursued a Master’s degree in Economics through distance education from Ethiraj College for Women, Chennai.

== Career ==
Sreethu Krishnan began her career as a child artist in the Tamil television series 7C on Vijay TV in 2012.

She gained recognition for her roles in television such as Aayutha Ezhuthu and Ammayariyathe. From 2020 to 2023, she portrayed Aleena Peter in Ammayariyathe and won the Best New Face award at the Asianet Television Awards in 2022.

In addition to acting, Sreethu has participated in various dance reality shows.

She made her film debut in 2015 with 10 Endrathukulla, playing the role of James Bond’s sister. Her filmography includes Rangoon (2017), Iruttu Araiyil Murattu Kuththu (2018), and the short film Burst Out (2020).

In 2024, she participated in Bigg Boss Malayalam Season 6.

== Television ==
Year(s)	Title	Role	Channel	Language	Notes	Ref.
2012-2013	7aam Vaguppu C Pirivu	Vennila	Vijay TV	Tamil		
2012	Odi Vilayadu Pappa	Contestant	Kalaignar TV	Tamil		
2015	Mari	Mari	Vijay TV	Tamil		
2015	Melle Thirandhathu Kadhavu	Selvi	Zee Tamizh	Tamil		
2017	Dancing Khilladies	Contestant	Zee Tamizh	Tamil		
2017-2018	Kalyanamam Kalyanam	Kamali	Star Vijay	Tamil		
2018	Jodi Fun Unlimited	Contestant	Vijay TV	Tamil		
2018	Super Singer (Season 6)	Guest	Vijay TV	Tamil		
2018	Enkitta Modhaade	Guest	Vijay TV	Tamil		
2019	Petta Rap	Contestant	Zee Tamizh	Tamil		
2019	Boeing Boeing	Contestant	Zee Keralam	Malayalam		
2019	Aayutha Ezhuthu	Indira	Vijay TV	Tamil		
2020-2023	Ammayariyathe	Aleena Peter	Asianet	Malayalam		
2020	Avarodoppam Aliyum Achayanum	Aleena Peter	Asianet	Malayalam	Onam special tele-film	
2021	Murattu Singles	Judge	Vijay TV	Tamil		
2021	Start Music Season 3	Contestant	Asianet	Malayalam	Also Guest appearance in promo	
2022	Super Queen	Contestant	Zee Tamil	Tamil		
2022	Happy Valentine’s Day	Dancer	Asianet	Malayalam		
2022	Mounaragam	Aleena Peter	Asianet	Malayalam	Cameo Appearance	
2022	Start Music (Season 4)	Contestant	Asianet	Malayalam		
2023	Start Music (Season 5)	Contestant	Asianet	Malayalam		
2024	Bigg Boss (Malayalam season 6)	Contestant	Asianet	Malayalam	Evicted Day 95	
2024	Star Singer season 9	Guest	Asianet	Malayalam		
2024	Enkile Ennodu Para	Contestant	Asianet	Malayalam		
2025	Dhoolpet Police Station	Lawyer Madhangi	Aha Tamil	Tamil	Web series	
TBA	Madam Police	Meera	Sony Vizha	Tamil		

== Filmography ==
=== Films ===
Year	Film	Role	Language	Notes	Ref.
2015	10 Endrathukulla	James Bond's sister	Tamil	Debut film	
2017	Rangoon	Herself	Tamil		
2018	Iruttu Araiyil Murattu Kuththu	Veera's potential bride	Tamil		

=== Other works ===
Year	Title	Role	Language	Note	Ref.
2024	Priyathama	Bride	Malayalam	Music album	
2025	Madras Malar	Herself	Malayalam	Musical short film	

== Awards ==
Year	Award	Category	Show	Result	Ref.
2022	Asianet Television Awards	Best New Face	Ammayariyathe	Won	
2024	Behindwoods Gold Icons	Trending Duo Award	Bigg Boss (Malayalam season 6)	Won	
