= Ammayariyathe =

Indian television series

- Genre: Drama; Crime drama Revenge drama Thriller; Romance; Action
- Written by: Pradeep Panicker
- Story by: Pradeep Panicker
- Directed by: Praveen Kadakkavoor
- Starring: Sreethu Krishnan; Keerthi Gopinath; Nikhil Nair
- Composers: Music: M. Jayachandran; Theme song Singer: K.S Chithra Background Score: Sanand George Grace
- Country of origin: India
- Original language: Malayalam
- No. of episodes: 826

Production
- Producers: Anoop Thomas; K. Faisal; Daveed John
- Cinematography: Krishna Kodanad
- Editor: Selvaraj Kurumbakkara
- Camera setup: Multi-camera
- Running time: 15-21 minutes

Original release
- Network: Asianet; Disney+ Hotstar
- Release: 22 June 2020 – 6 May 2023

Ammayariyathe (transl. Without Mother's Knowledge) was an Indian television crime drama series starring Sreethu Krishnan, Keerthi Gopinath and Nikhil Nair. It was written by Pradeep Panicker and directed by Praveen Kadakkavoor. The show premiered on 22 June 2020 and ended on 6 May 2023. It aired on the Malayalam General Entertainment Channel Asianet, and is also available on the digital platform Disney+ Hotstar. The series follows the story of a mother and daughter separated by unfortunate circumstances.

== Plot ==
Sulekha lives happily with her sixteen-year-old daughter Neeraja and politician husband, Bhaskar. Their world crumbles when members from Bhaskar's rival party murder him and three youngsters rape Neeraja after encountering her. She is left comatose for over a year and pregnant with the rapists' child. Sulekha gives the newborn girl to a man but he abandons her in a drunken state and the child is believed to be dead. Sulekha becomes the mayor. Neeraja recovers and forgets the events and Sulekha decides to hide the truth from her.

Neeraja marries a kind man named Mahadevan, who is unaware of her past. They have a child named Aparna. Meanwhile, Aleena Peter, a budding novelist and lecturer in the college where Aparna studies is revealed to be Neeraja's daughter, who was rescued and raised by a lawyer, Peter Tharakan. She is vengeful towards her mother as she thinks that Neeraja abandoned her after an illicit relationship. Aleena starts to create problems for Neeraja's family including breaking up Aparna's marriage. Neeraja and Aparna discover this and turn against Aleena. Sulekha realises that Aleena is her granddaughter and reveals the truth about Neeraja to Aleena. Aparna attempts to poison Aleena, but she survives. Aleena vows to take revenge on her mother's perpetrators.

Aleena learns from Sulekha that the popular film star Vinayachandran 'Vinayan' Menon, the father of Aleena's best friend and Aparna's ex-fiancée Akash is one of Neeraja's rapists, but she refuses to reveal the other two. Aparna and Mahadevan get to know Aleena and she reveals what happened to her mother, by portraying Neeraja as another woman that she will never know. Neeraja feels sympathetic to Aleena and treats her like her own daughter.

Aleena is saved by a man named Ambadi, the son of a major, to prevent him from being kidnapped. He helps her to find the second culprit, Murthy Chandrashekharan, unaware of Aleena's intentions. After multiple meetings and Sulekha's request to secretly be bodyguard to Aleena, Ambadi falls in love with her but Aleena is oblivious to this. Their friendship almost comes to an end when Ambadi's uncle, who is a friend of Murthy and Vinayan asks him about her intentions. Ambadi questions Aleena's intentions but she refuses, fearing that Ambadi may hate her. Aleena realises her feelings for him and reveals her past to Ambadi. He allies with Aleena to avenge Neeraja's perpetrators. He reveals Aleena's past to his uncle, hiding the fact that Aleena is the child, but his uncle tries to convince him that it is a lie. Ambadi grows suspicious of his uncle and decides to spy on him. He learns that the third person who molested Neeraja is his uncle, Sachidanandan "Sachi", a politician and Sulekha's rival. He confronts Sachi, angered. Sachi sends goons to kill his party member Rajeev and falsely accuses Ambadi when he was on the way to his training camp. Ambadi is arrested, but Aleena proves his innocence in court, using her skills as a lawyer. This makes Draupadi, Ambadi's mother, support the Aleena-Ambadi alliance. Later, Mahadevan narrates Neeraja's story to Draupadi, who ousts Sachi. Sachi decides to kill his whole family, including Draupadi. Aparna's senior Vineeth falls for her and wants to marry her. However, Aparna's marriage is arranged with Giridhar "Giri", a businessman. It is revealed that Giri is a goon sent by Sachi to kill Aparna as revenge against Aleena. However, Aleena and Ambadi are suspicious of Giri and plot to save Aparna. Sachi plans to kill Mahadevan during the marriage. Giri attempts to shoot Mahadevan but fails and Giri dies in the process.

The family is tense about Aparna's wedding. Ambadi and Aleena come up with an idea to get Aparna married to Vineet as it was his wish. The family agrees except Aparna, but the couple gets married. It is revealed that Giri's real name is Narendra and a wanted criminal. Aparna and Vineeth fail to lead a peaceful married life. Meanwhile, Vinayan dies mysteriously. The police interrogate Vinayan's wife, Nanditha and his son, Aakash. Aakash blames Aleena for Vinayan's death. Narendra's twin brother Jitendra plants a bomb in Neeraja's car and after it explodes, she is presumed dead, but returns to the house safe and unharmed. It is revealed that it was Sulekha who died in the crash. Later Ambadi reveals that Neeraja killed Vinayan with a wood log and Ambadi took him to Sachi's guesthouse.The next day Ambadi goes to Hyderabad for the I.P.S training camp. Subhadra's brother is introduced to Pankunni. Pankunni goes to Neeraja's house and meets Jithendra. Pankunni tries to attack him but fails. Mahadevan mistakes Pankunni for Jithendra and hits him with a branch. Jithendra thinks Pankunni is Neeraja's security guard.

After Aparna's change of heart, Vineet invites her to his home. At night they both get into an argument, where Subhadra gets injured. Vineeth and Pankunni take her to hospital. Meanwhile, Jithendra goes to get Aparna. While Jithendra is breaking in, Pankunni arrives and Jithendra hides outside in the dark. Jithendra tries to escape and Pankunni attacks him but fails. Once Vineet reaches home he decides to part ways with Aparna, but the two reconcile. Rajini confronts Moorthy and reminds him of his consequences. Later Moorthy asks Jithendra to kill her. Jithesh finds Jithendra but gets struck in the head with a hammer. Rajini shoots Jithendra but he escapes. He holds a doctor's daughter hostage and finally Aleena realises the truth, goes to the doctor's house and shoots him. They both get injured and are hospitalized, but Jithendran escapes.

Ambadi is unaware of what happened to Aleena. Believing that she is angry for his poor treatment of her at his training camp, he is heartbroken and thinks that she misunderstood seeing him with his colleague Anupama. He decides to end their relationship. Later they reconcile with the help of Ambadi's mother, Draupadi. Ambadi decides to take a break from training and asks his unethical course director Narasimhan, who is the henchman of Vimoosa, to allocate a week of leave, saying that his maternal uncle is dead. Anupama, who is vengeful towards Ambadi because of his relation with Sachi, asks to take her along, only to attack him with goons on the street. She drugs him and waits for the goons to come, but realises the truth at the last minute and rescues him. She reveals her past to Ambadi who decides to help her out. Upon reaching his home Ambadi reveals the same to Draupadi. Aleena is ecstatic about Ambadi returning, so visits him, only to stumble upon his prank, and leaves heartbroken. Later Ambadi takes Aleena to Anupama's house and reveals the story.

Aleena writes about Sachi in the newspaper. When Sachi sees the newspaper he decides to visit Jithendra. Later Jithendra and Sachi plan a brutal plot against Neeraja. Ambadi and Aleena's parents fix their engagement. Sachi tells Jithendra about Aleena and Ambadi's engagement and decides to take Aparna to his base. Meanwhile, Ambadi and Aleena begin their engagement. Jithendra calls Mahadevan and informs him about Aparna's state. Mahadevan later faints from being worried about what he heard. He finally reveals everything that happened to everyone. Dominic tracks the location of the phone. Meanwhile, Sachi and Moorthy throw Aparna off a cliff. Dominic tells Ambadi the cliff's location. Later Ambadi meets Jithendra and they fight each other. When Ambadi is about to throw Jithendra off the cliff, they both fall down the cliff. Ambadi is paralysed and in critical state. Jithendra is presumed dead. It is later revealed that Jithendra is healed near the cliff in an Ayurvedic hospital, which is owned by Murugheshan and his son Kaaliyan.

Later Murugheshan agrees to help Ambadi. Jithendra's cunning actions make Kathir, Kaaliyan's sister, fall in love with Jithendra. Kathir tells Jithendra about Ambadi's condition. Once Shankaramaman leaves Ambadi's room, Jithendra breaks in and meets Ambadi. Jithendra tries to kill Ambadi but Kaaliyan arrives at the last second and asks Jithendra what he is doing and Jithendra gets away with a lie. At night Jithendra tries to choke Ambadi but Aleena wakes up and foils the plan. Jithendra demands a gun from Sachi. He gets into trouble when Kaaliyan finds Jithendra with a gun and doubts him. Kaliyan says he will give the gun back later. The next day Aleena and Kathir go to a nearby temple while Jithendra breaks into Amabi's room. Ambadi manages to fight back. The next night Jithendra tries to kill Aleena but Jithendra ends up getting thrashed by Ambadi. After learning the news, Kaaliyan and Selvan tie Jithendra to a tree for the wolves. The next day Kaaliyan and Selvan find and empty the tree with broken strings. It is later revealed that Jithendra is saved by a forest tribe. Meanwhile, Dominic advises Kaaliyan to search for Jithendra. Later she spots Kaaliyan and persuades Panchami, the tribe leader's daughter, to show him a way out. Panchami takes Jithendra to a river which connects to a road and Jithendra escapes again. Kaaliyan tells the tribe leader about Jithendra's evil deeds. Later they find Panchami near the river.

== Cast ==
=== Main ===
- Sreethu Krishnan as Adv. Aleena Peter : A college lecturer, noted novelist, classical dancer and newspaper columnist; Neeraja's daughter; Mahadevan's step-daughter; Peter's adopted daughter; Aparna's half-sister; Ambadi's wife. (2020–2023)
- Keerthi Gopinath as Neeraja Mahadevan: A renowned novelist; Sulekha and Bhaskaran's daughter; Mahadevan's wife; Aleena and Aparna's mother. (2020–2023)
  - Amritha Manoj as Teenage Neeraja (2020)
- Nikhil Nair as IPS Ambadi Arjunan: An IPS officer and social worker; Arjunan and Draupadi's son; Samudra's cousin and former love interest; Aleena's husband. (2020–2023)
- Dileep Shankar as Adv. Peter Tharakan: A well-known High-Court advocate; Aleena's adoptive father and mentor. (2020–2023)
- Boban Alummoodan as Mahadevan: A businessman; Neeraja's husband; Aparna's father; Aleena's step-father. (2020–2023)
- Parvathy P. Nair as Aparna Vineeth: Neeraja and Mahadevan's daughter; Aleena's half-sister and student; Akash and Giridhar's ex-fiancée; Vineeth's wife. (2020–2023)
- Sajin John as Vineeth: Subhadra's son; Aleena's student; Aparna's college senior and husband. (2021–2023)
- Subhash Nair as Kulathoorpuzha Sachidanandan aka Sachi / K.S.: A noted politician; Draupadi's brother; Vinayan and Moorthi's best friend; Neeraja's first assaulter; Chitra's husband; Aleena and Samudra's father. (2020–2023)
- Mohan Ayroor as R. Gangadharan Menon MP aka R.G.: A renowned Politician; Neeraja's assaulter; Bhaskaran's murderer. (2023)
- Bincy Joseph as Ancy

=== Recurring ===
- Bindhu Aneesh as Rajini Moorthy: Chief Minister of Kerala, Ex Chairperson of Kerala Women's Empowerment Department; Moorthy's ex - wife; Jithesh's mother.
- Poornima Anand as Draupadi Arjunan: Sachi's sister; Arjunan's widow; Ambadi's mother. (2020–2023)
- Devi Ajith as Dr. Racheal / Shanthi – Psychologist; Aleena's fake mother.
- Shobi Thilakan as DYSP Dominic Thomas: An honest police officer
- Gopan as Shankarankutty aka Shankaramama: Caretaker of Ambadi's family
- Shylaja Sreedharan Nair as Subhadra: Vineeth's mother.
- Sujitha Stany as IPS Anupama "Anu" Divakaran: Divakaran's daughter; Ambadi's batchmate and friend
- Sreejith Sreekantan as SI Kaliyan
- Thomas Kuriakose as IG Joseph: Former SP; Sulekha's acquaintance
- Issac Varghese as DYSP Saravanan: Sachidanandan's ally
- Ashish Kannan Unni as Joe: Vineeth's best friend; Aleena's student.
- Vinayak as Jithesh Moorthy: Moorthy and Rajini's son; Aleena's student; Aparna's classmate
- Pala Aravindan as Divakaran: Anupama's father
- Dominic Chittat as DIG Narasimhan IPS: IPS Cadets Course Director
- Pradeep Prabhakar as Pangunni: Vineeth's uncle
- Shana Jessan as Shany: Anupama's friend and an IPS trainee
- Daveed John as Tony: Ambadi's best friend
- Abin Thomas as Muthumaran (Maaran): Ambadi's Colleague in Training Camp
- Vaishnavi Saikumar as Dr. Reena: SP Joseph's daughter; Lalymol's mother
- Baby Lakshya as Lalymol: Reena's daughter
- Salmanul Faris as Akash Menon: Young film actor; Nanditha and Vinayan's son
- Shilpa Martin as Samudra Sachidanandan: Sachidanandan and Chitra's daughter; Aleena's half-sister
- Ambili as Chitra Sachidanandan: Sachi's wife; Samudra's mother
- T. S. Raju as Mamachan Keralabhoomi a.k.a. MK: Chief editor of Keralabhoomi magazine
- Priya Varma / Divya M. Nair / Diseema Divakaran as Nanditha Vinay Menon: Vinayan's widow; Akash's mother
- Aju Thomas as Yadhu Nandan: Vineeth's and Joe's friend and Aleena's student
- Rithika Krishna as Rasika: Yadhu Nandan's girlfriend
- Devika S. as Kathir: Kaliyan's sister
- J. Padmanabhan Thampi as ADGP K. Sadashivan Nair
- Reena as Sulekha Bhaskaran: Ex-mayor; Bhaskaran's widow; Neeraja's mother; Aleena and Aparna's grandmother (Dead)
- Anand / Roy Varghese as Vinayachandran "Vinayan" Menon: A famous film actor; Nanditha's husband; Akash's father; Neeraja's assaulter; Moorthy and Sachi's best friend. (Dead)
- Yehia Khader as Moorthy Chandrashekhar: An Indo-American businessman; Vinayan and Sachi's best friend; Neeraja's assaulter; Rajini's husband; Jithesh's father. (Dead)
- Joemon Joshy as Ramakanthan Rareeram: an unknown novelist
- Faisal K as Kallada Jayachandran: Politician and Sachi's Party Secretary
- Jayakrishnan Narayanan as Thampi
- Thirumala Ramachandran as Lal: Akash's personal assistant
- Arya Sreeram as Teena: Mamachan's assistant and distant relative of Peter Tharakan
- Cherthala Lalitha as Mamachan's wife
- Sarath Swami in duel role as:
  - Giridhar / Narendran (Dead) (EP:238-283)
  - Jithendran (340–708): (Dead) Narendran's twin brother, a wanted criminal who seeks revenge for his brother's death. He is appointed by Sachi to destroy Neeraja's family.

=== Guest appearances ===
- Asha Sarath as herself (episodes 1–2)
- Meera Vasudevan as Sumithra (in promotional teaser)
- Gowri Prakash as Anumol (in promotional teaser)

== Production ==
The series was planned to premiere on 30 March 2020. However, owing to the COVID-19 pandemic in India, production and shooting were stalled on 23 March 2020 and Malayalam television shoots were only permitted in June 2020. This caused the premiere to be postponed until 22 June 2020. It aired at 7:30 pm IST, but was shifted to 8:00 pm IST before once again being shifted back to 7:30 pm IST. From 13 February 2023, it began airing at 6:30 pm IST. From 26 March onwards the serial started airing at 6:00 pm and went off air on 6 May 2023.

=== Casting ===
The show marks the comeback, after 23 years, of actress Keerthi Gopinath, south Indian actor Anand, and his wife Poornima Anand to Malayalam television. Tamil actress Sreethu Krishnan and Telugu actor Nikhil Nair make their Malayalam debut in the lead roles. The show also features TV-film actors Boban Alummoodan, T.S.Raju, Reena, and actress Parvathy (child actor - Paarijatham) in prominent roles. Salmanul Faris, Yehia Khader, Dileep Shankar, Bindhu Aneesh and others also appear in this series.

== Reception ==
The pair of the show, Aleena - Ambadi was well received by audience. In April 2021, Nikhil Nair, who played Ambadi in the series, exited the show because he got an opportunity to act as a lead in a Telugu film, which had been a long-time dream for him. To pursue this, he had to leave the serial. His exit had triggered a strong emotional response from fans especially with hashtag campaigns, with many requesting him to return. However, due to delays in the film's shooting caused by the second wave of COVID-19, the serial team approached him again, and he eventually made a comeback.

The show maintained good TRP and top positions for over two and half years. But due to its time change to evening slot for premiere of Geeta Govindam, its viewership dropped to 6th position.

== Adaptations ==
Language	Title	Release date	Network(s)	Last aired	Notes
Malayalam	Ammayariyathe അമ്മയറിയാതെ	22 June 2020	Asianet	6 May 2023	Original
Telugu	Ammaku Teliyani Koilamma అమ్మకు తెలియని కోయిలమ్మ	19 July 2021	Star Maa	27 November 2021	Remake
