= Molly Easo Smith =

Indian-American scholar and academic administrator

- Born: 1958 (age 67–68); Chennai, Tamil Nadu, India
- Education: University of Madras

Molly Easo Smith (born 1958 in Chennai, India) is an Indian-American professor and scholar of Shakespeare and Renaissance drama, and academic administrator.

== Biography ==
Born in Chennai in India, Dr. Smith graduated from Ethiraj College for Women and Madras Christian College in the University of Madras, with BA and MA degrees in English, respectively, and from Auburn University with a PhD in English Literature in 1988. In 1991, she was awarded a grant by the American Council of Learned Societies to conduct research on Renaissance drama, a topic on which she later wrote two books and several articles. Her research and teaching interests include the sixteenth and seventeenth centuries, Shakespeare, Women in Drama, and the development of theatre. She has held faculty posts at a number of colleges, including Ithaca College, St. Louis University, the University of Aberdeen in Scotland, and Stephen F. Austin State University.

She served as the Dean of the College of Arts and Sciences at Seton Hall University from 2002 to 2006. While at Seton Hall, she received a vote of no confidence from a minority of the college of arts and sciences faculty after releasing a Seton Hall professor from administrative duties.

=== President of Manhattanville College ===
From 2006 to 2008, she served as the provost of Wheaton College in Massachusetts and served as the 11th President of Manhattanville College from 2009 to 2011.

At the end of her first year at Manhattanville, in May 2010, students staged a protest in response to the resignation of two administrators, the academic dean and acting vice president for student affairs, and vice president of enrollment. "Most of the outrage was focused toward" Smith noting that she had "cut programs and made changes without taking input from students and staff". With respect to the resigning administrators, "many of the students protesting were international students who said that [one of those departing admins] had played a major part of their decision to come to the school."

In 2011, she was recognized by the Westchester Business Council as "Businesswoman of the Year" at the annual Awards Banquet and was featured in the New York Times as one among a handful of foreign-born presidents of United States colleges and universities. She was also recognized for her leadership in education by the National Federation of Indian Americans and by the Kerala Center.

That same year, a letter from Robert Hall, Chairman of the Board of Trustees, stated: "the Manhattanville College Board of Trustees is announcing an executive management transition. Molly Easo Smith, Ph.D. has decided to step down from her role as President effective today, May 31." J.J. Pryor, a school spokesperson, said in a statement that Smith left after achieving specific goals and objectives for which she was appointed by the board of trustees in 2009. "This includes the recruitment of a strong leadership team, refocusing the college's commitment to its core values of academic excellence, civic engagement and social action and the engagement of alumni to the Manhattanville College community."

She served as Provost of University of Wisconsin, Superior from 2018 to 2019, interim Provost at Stonehill College from 2019 to 2020, and provost of Thomas More University from 2020 to 2022. In 2026, she was listed as an emeritus professor in the English department at Thomas More University.

== Books ==
- Breaking Boundaries: Politics and Play in the Drama of Shakespeare and his Contemporaries (1998)
- The Darker World Within: Evil in the Tragedies of Shakespeare and his Successors (1991)
