= Shruti Naidu =

Indian film actor and producer

- Born: Mysore
- Occupation: Producer
- Website: shrutinaiduchithra.com

Shruti Naidu is an Indian film and television producer known for her works in Kannada cinema.

== Personal life ==
She is the only child to her parents. Her father is Janardhana Naidu, a bank manager. Her mother is Susheela Belawadi, also a bank manager, and a relative to Prakash Belawadi.

== Career ==
In her early career, she assisted TV commercials producer M.G. Sathya. She was part of serial Preethi Illadha Mele′' on ETV. She has directed Kannada television soaps/serials like Brahmagantu'′, ′'Shrirasthu Shubhamasthu′', ′'Punar Vivaha'′, Yaare Nee Mohini and '′Mahadevi′'.

== Filmography ==
- Premier Padmini (2019) (as producer)

== Television ==
List of television daily soaps produced by Shruti Naidu, under Shruti Naidu Chitra Production are:

Year	Title	Channel	Notes
2008	Nammamma Sharadhe	Zee Kannada	
2009	Chi Sow Savitri	Zee Kannada	2 Seasons
2009	Devi	Zee Kannada	Weekend serial later shifted to weekdays on demand
2010	Rajakumari	Zee Kannada	
2013 to 2016	Punar Vivaha	Zee Kannada	Remake of Punar Vivaah – Zindagi Milegi Dobara
2013	Athi Madhura Anuraaga	Zee Kannada	Short Serial
2014	Shreerastu Shubhamasthu	Zee Kannada	
2015 to 2019	Mahadevi	Zee Kannada	3 Chapters
2016	Mahanadi	Zee Kannada	Story is on Triangle Love story, Horror, Politics
2017	Sanju Mattu Naanu	Colors Kannada	24 episodes Weekend Short serial
2017 to 2021	Brahmagantu	Zee Kannada	Remake of Badho Bahu
2017 to 2020	Yaare Nee Mohini	Zee Kannada	Remake of Yaaradi Nee Mohini
2020	Amnoru	Udaya TV	Socio-Mytho serial
2020 to 2022	Sangharsha	Star Suvarna	Remake of Ayutha Ezathu
2020 to 2023	Manasella Neene	Star Suvarna	Remake of Yeh Hai Chahatein
2023 to 2024	Preetiya Arasi	Udaya TV	Remake of Mr. Manaivi
