= Mona Hensman =

Indian politician (1899–1991)

Member of Parliament, Rajya Sabha
- In office 1952–1956
- Constituency: Madras State

Member of the Madras Legislative Council
- In office 1937-1952

Personal details
- Born: Mona Mitter; 25 August 1899 Berhampore, Ganjam District, Madras Presidency, British India (Now in Odisha)
- Died: 5 December 1991 (aged 92) Chennai
- Party: Indian National Congress
- Spouse: Dr. Henry S. Hensman
- Children: Rajkumar Hensman and Benodini S Banerjei, Dhiren Banerjei only grand child

Mona Hensman MBE (25 August 1899 – 5 December 1991), born Mona Mitter, was an Indian educator, feminist, and politician. She was a Member of Parliament, representing Madras State in the Rajya Sabha, the upper house of India's Parliament, as a member of the Indian National Congress. She was the first Women whip in Indian Parliament. She was the Principal of Ethiraj College for Women from 1953 to 1960.

== Early life and education ==
Mona Mitter was born in Berhampore in 1899, the daughter of R. K. Mitter and Benodini Bose Mitter. Her father was a surgeon and a lieutenant colonel in the military. In India she attended St. Hilda’s in Ootacamund, then she continued her education at Bedford Girls' School and at Westfield College in London. She earned a bachelor's degree in language and literature.

== Career ==
Hensman spent much of her career in higher education. She taught at Kinnaird College in Lahore as a young woman. In 1924, she became a professor of English and French at the Women's Christian College in Chennai. In 1930, Hensman served on the faculty senate at the University of Madras. She was the second principal of Ethiraj College for Women from 1953 to 1960, succeeding Subur Parthasarathy. In 1962 she attended the biennial conference of the Australian Federation of University Women, as former president of the Indian Federation of University Women.

Hensman took particular interest in supporting Christian women. In 1929 she was appointed the first Indian president of the YWCA in Chennai. In 1937, she was vice-president of the World YWCA. She attended International Council of Women meetings in Calcutta (1936) and Edinburgh (1938). She led one of the planning committees and was a delegate to the World Missionary Conference at Tambaram in 1938.

Hensman was a justice of the peace in Madras, and a Member of Parliament, representing Madras State in the Rajya Sabha, and as a member of the Indian National Congress. She was the first woman whip in the Indian parliament. She represented India at the United Nations.

In 1937, Hensman was made a Member of the Order of the British Empire (MBE).

== Personal life ==
Mona Mitter married Henry S. Hensman, a doctor by professional of Tamil Jaffna Origin. They had two children, Rajkumar and Benodini. Mona MItter died in 1991, aged 92 years, in Chennai.
