= Jagannathan Vijaya =

Indian herpetologist

J. Vijaya
- Born: 1959; Bangalore, Karnataka
- Died: Unknown (Her body was found in a forest in April 1987)
- Education: Ethiraj College, Chennai
- Known for: India’s first woman herpetologist
- Scientific career
- Fields: Herpetology
- Workplaces: Madras Crocodile Bank Trust

Jagannathan Vijaya (1959–1987) was India's first female herpetologist. She documented the movement of turtles all over the country and worked as an assistant to Edward Moll, the chairman of the World Conservation Union's Freshwater Chelonian Specialist Group.

== Biography ==
Vijaya was born in Bangalore. She did her early schooling there and went to Coimbatore for her high school due to a job transfer of her father. She studied in the St. Josephs matriculation school in Coimbatore for two years and then went to Chennai for her final school years.

While in her first year as a zoology student at Ethiraj College for Women, Chennai, she volunteered at the Madras Snake Park probably sometime in 1978. She trained under Romulus Whitaker and started working full-time at the Chennai Snake Park, then known as Madras Snake Park, after her graduation in 1981.

At 22, she was recommended by Romulus Whitaker to assist Edward Moll, the then chairman of the World Conservation Union's Freshwater Chelonian Specialist Group for an India-wide survey of turtles. She traveled all over the country and gathered data that helped reduce sea turtle exploitation.

Her research and photography of the slaughter of Olive Ridley turtles appeared on National magazine and led to the then prime minister Indira Gandhi to order the Coast Guard to take steps to stop the turtle trade.

== Recognition ==
Vijaya extensively researched and documented the forest cane turtle and she travelled across the forests of Kerala.

Her body was discovered April 1987 inside a forest, and the cause of her death was not determined.

To commemorate her work and sacrifice, the cane turtle which was found to belong to a new genus based on research conducted 19 years after her death, was named as Vijayachelys. Madras Crocodile Bank has a small memorial to her next to the turtle pond.
