= Ammaku Teliyani Koilamma =

Indian Telugu television series

- Genre: Drama; Crime; Thriller
- Based on: Ammayariyathe
- Written by: Dialogues: Gangotri Vishwanadha Sastry
- Screenplay by: Srikanth Reddy
- Story by: Pradeep Panicker
- Directed by: Meer; JN Raju
- Starring: Kavya Shree; Nikhil Maliyakkal; Manju Bhargavi; Ashwini Gowda
- Country of origin: India
- Original language: Telugu
- No. of episodes: 100

Production
- Producers: Srikanth Poluru; Praja Prabhakar
- Cinematography: SD Jhon
- Editor: Shekar Pasupuleti
- Camera setup: Multi-camera
- Production company: PP Film Factory

Original release
- Network: Star Maa
- Release: 19 July – 27 November 2021

Ammaku Teliyani Koilamma is an Indian Telugu language crime drama thriller series aired on Star Maa from 19 July 2021 to 27 November 2021. It stars Kavya Shree, Nikhil Maliyakkal, Ashwini Gowda and Manju Bhargavi in lead roles. It is an official remake of Malayalam television series Ammayariyathe airing on Asianet. It is also available on digital streaming platform Disney+ Hotstar.

== Synopsis ==
Shakuntala finds her mother, Neeraja, and misunderstanding her and seeks revenge on her. Later she learns the violent circumstances of her birth from her grandmother Sulekha. Then she decides to exact vengeance on all who harmed Neeraja. Meanwhile, she falls in love with Prem and marries him.

== Cast ==
=== Main ===
- Kavya Shree as Shakuntala; Neeraja's daughter; Sulekha's grand daughter; Prem's wife; Aaradhya's sister
- Nikhil Maliyakkal as Prem; Shakuntala's husband; Shyamala's son
- Manju Bhargavi as Sulekha; Shakuntala and Aaradhya's grand mother; Sreedhar's mother in law
- Ashwini Gowda as Neeraja; Shakuntala and Aaradhya's mother; Sreedhar's wife; Sulekha's daughter

=== Recurring ===
- Rachana Gowda as Aaradhya; Neeraja and Sreedhar's daughter; Virat's ex-lover
- Vinod Bala as Peter; Shakuntala's foster father
- Raja Sridhar as Sreedhar; Neeraja's husband; Aaradhya's father; Sulekha's son in law; Shakuntala's step father
- Chinna as Ramaswamy; Press owner
- Srilatha as Shyamala; Prem's mother; Shakuntala's mother in law; Murthy's sister
- Srinivas as Prem's father
- Surya as Ramesh Babu; Sulekha's friend; Commissioner of police
- Akhilraj Uddemari as Virat; Aaradhya's ex-lover; Shoban's son; Film actor
- Hari Krishna as Murthy; Prem's uncle; Shyamala's brother; Shoban's friend; Music director
- Vijay Reddy as Shoban; Virat's father; Murthy's friend; Film actor
- Madhuri as Ramaswamy's wife
- Chandu as Prem's friend
- Sai Kumar as Prem's friend
- Chinnu Srilatha as Shakuntala's friend
- Niranjan as Sachitandha; Murthy's friend; Police officer
- Jabardasth Dorababu as Shakuntala's bridegroom
- Lakshmi Prasanna as Shakuntala's foster grand mother; Peter's mother
- Bharani Shankar as Bhaskar; Sulekha's husband; Neeraja's father

=== Cameo appearances ===
- Mukesh Gowda as Rishi
- Raksha Gowda as Vasudhara
- Priyanka Jain as Janaki
- Nalini Bandi as Professor
- Shobha Raju as herself

== Soundtrack ==
No.	Title	Lyrics	Music	Length
1.	"Ammaku Teliyani Koilamma title song"	Chakravarthula	Josyabhatla	5:35
Total length:				5:35

== Adaptations ==
Language	Title	Release date	Network(s)	Last aired	Notes
Malayalam	Ammayariyathe അമ്മയറിയാതെ	22 June 2020	Asianet	6 May 2023	Original
Telugu	Ammaku Teliyani Koilamma అమ్మకు తెలియని కోయిలమ్మ	19 July 2021	Star Maa	27 November 2021	Remake
