= Selective aortic arch perfusion =

Selective aortic arch perfusion (SAAP) is an experimental treatment for haemorrhage-induced traumatic cardiac arrest. It has been shown in animal studies to be superior to Zone 1 REBOA once cardiac arrest has occurred.

== See also ==
- Resuscitative endovascular balloon occlusion of the aorta
