= Dileep Shankar =

Indian actor and director (1970–2024)

- Born: 29 October 1970; Delhi, India
- Died: 29 December 2024 (aged 54); Thiruvananthapuram, Kerala, India
- Occupations: Actor; Director; Writer
- Children: Two

Dileep Shankar (29 October 1970 – 29 December 2024) was an Indian actor, director and writer.

== Early life and acting career ==
Shankar was born in Delhi, India on 29 October 1970. He pursued his studies at St. Albert's College. Later, he furthered his education at MG University. He gained prominence for his performances in Malayalam films such as Chaappa Kurish (2011) and North 24 Kaatham (2013). He appeared in the television program Ammayariyathe (2020–2023), which spanned 235 episodes. His theatre roles included Cassio in Roysten Abel's adaptation of Shakespeare's Othello. His last appearance was in TV series Panchagni.

Shankar wrote 36 plays. Notable roles included his portrayal of Jawaharlal Nehru in Pramila Le Hunte's Nehru – His Inner Story and Raju Guide in Sanjoy Roy's adaptation of R. K. Narayan's Guide. Additionally, from 2010 to 2012, he served as the Show Running Director for Zangoora – The Gypsy Prince at the Kingdom of Dreams.

As a casting director, Shankar contributed to Indian films like Delhi 6 and Bhaag Milkha Bhaag as well as international films such as Life of Pi, Monsoon Wedding, and The Darjeeling Limited. Shankar also made other significant contributions in film production, including serving as associate director for Faith Connections, a documentary by Pan Nalin, and as a line producer for Samsara, Valley of Flowers, and Ayurveda – Art of Being.

== Personal life and death ==
Shankar was married to Suma and they had two children. He resided in Mumbai, Maharashtra.

Shankar died on 29 December 2024, at the age of 54. His body was found in a hotel room in Thiruvananthapuram.
