= Resuscitative endovascular balloon occlusion of the aorta =

Temporary procedure for trauma patients

Azbeartx/Resuscitative endovascular balloon occlusion of the aorta
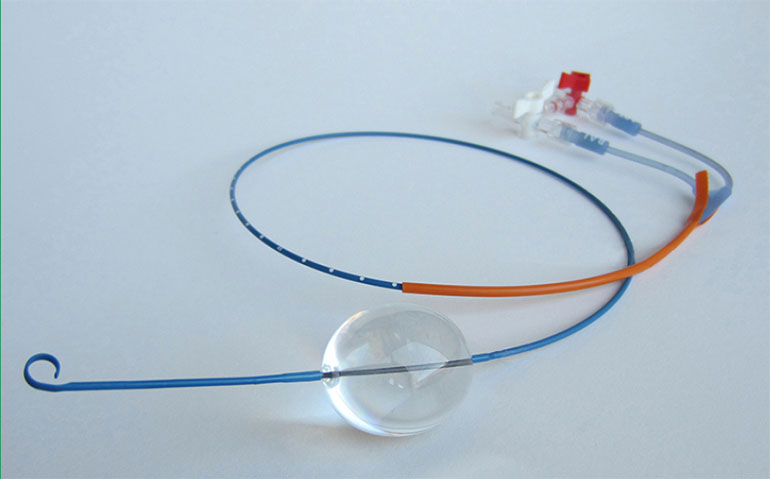
- Specialty: Trauma surgery, vascular surgery, emergency medicine, interventional radiology
- Uses: Severe hemorrhage, non-compressible torso hemorrhage, pelvic hemorrhage, obstetric hemorrhage, gastrointestinal hemorrhage.
- Other options: Emergency Thoracotomy with Aortic Cross Clamping

Resuscitative endovascular balloon occlusion of the aorta (REBOA) is a minimally-invasive procedure performed during resuscitation of critically-injured trauma patients. Originally developed as a less invasive alternative to emergency thoracotomy with aortic cross clamping, REBOA is performed to gain rapid control of non-compressible truncal or junctional hemorrhage. REBOA is performed first by achieving access to the common femoral artery (CFA) and advancing a catheter within the aorta. Upon successful catheter placement, an occluding balloon may be inflated either within the descending thoracic aorta (Zone 1) or infrarenal abdominal aorta (Zone 3). REBOA stanches downstream hemorrhage and improves cardiac index, cerebral perfusion, and coronary perfusion. Although REBOA does not eliminate the need for definitive hemorrhage control, it may serve as a temporizing measure during initial resuscitation. Despite the benefits of REBOA, there are significant local and systemic ischemic risks. Establishing standardized REBOA procedural indications and mitigating the risk of ischemic injury are topics of ongoing investigation. Although this technique has been successfully deployed in adult patients, it has not yet been studied in children.

== Medical uses ==
=== Traumatic injury ===
Severe hemorrhagic shock caused by non-compressible traumatic injury to the torso and junctional regions remains a major cause of death among civilian and military trauma victims. In contrast to peripheral hemorrhage caused by injury to an extremity, traumatic injuries to the torso and junctional regions are not amendable to direct pressure or tourniquet application. Because non-compressible torso hemorrhages are not amendable to external interventions, these injuries account for approximately 90% of exsanguinating deaths. Severe hemorrhage is managed either with vascular embolization or damage control surgical techniques such as abdominal packing or removal of non-essential organs. However, in patients with severe hemorrhagic shock at risk for cardiovascular collapse, emergency thoracotomy with aortic cross clamping may be performed though outcomes are typically poor.

==== REBOA deployment ====
REBOA was developed as a rapidly deployable, minimally invasive alternative to emergency thoracotomy with aortic cross-clamping. Although there is no single indication criteria for the procedure, it is typically performed for patients with either blunt or penetrating traumatic injuries to the torso with severe hemorrhage refractory to blood product resuscitation. REBOA is performed by gaining access to the common femoral artery and inserting a small endovascular catheter with an inflatable balloon within the aorta. Upon inflation of the occluding balloon, blood flow across the descending aorta is either partially or completely obstructed which subsequently stanches downstream bleeding. The adjustable catheter design of the REBOA device allows for variable positioning of the occluding balloon within the aorta based on the suspected source of bleeding. Zone 1 positioning in the descending thoracic aorta minimizes blood flow below the diaphragm and significantly reduces bleeding within the abdomen, pelvis, and lower extremities. Alternatively, Zone 3 placement within the infrarenal descending abdominal aorta reduces bleeding within the pelvis and lower extremities while preserving blood supply within the abdomen. Although REBOA does not replace the need for definitive surgical management, it may act as a temporizing measure by temporarily augmenting cardiac index to preserve cerebral and myocardial perfusion. Immediately following successful REBOA deployment, patients must be considered for emergent surgical intervention.

==== Ongoing investigation ====
The safety and efficacy of REBOA in the treatment of severe hemorrhagic shock is an area of ongoing research. Early studies reported conflicting data regarding mortality and failed to establish any clear benefit of REBOA when compared to emergency thoracotomy with aortic cross clamping. However, design improvements of the REBOA device and continuously evolving patient selection criteria have subsequently improved REBOA outcomes. Current literature demonstrates a survival benefit of REBOA deployment in patients with severe hemorrhagic shock who do not require cardiopulmonary resuscitation (CPR). However, despite REBOA demonstrating its greatest efficacy when deployed prior to cardiovascular collapse, recent data has also shown promise when deployed during CPR. Closed cardiopulmonary compressions with the REBOA device deployed has demonstrated improved cardiac compression fraction and end-tidal CO_{2} when compared to emergency thoracotomy with aortic cross clamping and cardiac massage. Additionally, some centers have promoted REBOA deployment in patients with hypotension at risk for progression to severe hemorrhagic shock but who do not yet meet criteria for emergency thoracotomy with aortic cross clamping. The variability in REBOA outcomes likely reflects the variability in institutional patient selection and indications criteria which highlights the need for ongoing evaluation.

== Key procedural steps ==
Access to the common femoral artery is first achieved using ultrasound guided, open, or percutaneous technique. The REBOA device is then positioned either within Zone 1 (descending thoracic aorta) or Zone 3 (infrarenal abdominal aorta) before the occluding balloon is inflated with saline. Upon successful definitive hemorrhage control, the occluding balloon is slowly deflated and the patient is monitored for recurrent bleeding or metabolic derangement. Finally, the REBOA sheath is removed and the patient is monitored for access site complications or potential ischemic complications.

== Potential complications ==
Despite the minimally invasive nature of the REBOA device, there are significant risks associated with its use. Although occlusion of the aorta may temporarily augment cardiac index to preserve cardiac and coronary perfusion, there is a significant risk of downstream ischemia which may lead to local ischemic changes or systemic metabolic derangement. Significant complications such as limb amputation, metabolic acidosis, and severe reperfusion injury have all been reported with REBOA use and are the subjects of ongoing research. Although there is no definitive consensus within the academic or surgical communities, many centers recommend balloon occlusion times of less than 30 minutes whenever possible to minimize the risk of clinically significant ischemia. Alternatively, some institutions have recommended partial aortic occlusion or intermittent balloon deflation to minimize the effect of downstream ischemia. Although intermittent balloon deflation is less technically difficult to perform, partial occlusion of the aorta has been demonstrated to reduce uncontrolled hemorrhage while simultaneously limiting distal ischemia and extending safe occlusion times.

Additional potential complications are listed below:

- Access site hematoma
- Arterial injury
- Pseudo-aneurysm
- Aortic injury
- Local Ischemia
- Metabolic derangement
- Acidosis
- Limb amputation
- Renal infarct
- Thrombosis

== See also ==
- Selective aortic arch perfusion
- Balloon tamponade
- Todd Rasmussen, co-inventor
