= Service as a product =

Service as a product (SaaP); pronounced /sæp/ or /sɑːp/ is a transaction of service production and delivery model in which a productized service is sold by the seller or vendor to the buyer and is centrally hosted, either on a standalone website or an open marketplace platform. It is sometimes referred to as "on-demand service". SaaP is typically accessed by the creator and the consumer by users using a thin client via a web browser.

SaaP has become a delivery model for some businesses, including small and medium-sized enterprises (SMEs), freelancers, and independent contractors. It has been incorporated into the strategy of several leading web-based marketplace companies including AirBnB, Fiverr, Lyft, TaskRabbit, Uber and others, as listed in the SaaP marketplace platforms section below.

Micha Kaufman, the co-founder of the company Fiverr, claims that the company created the concept of SaaP. The company offers as a SaaP service over 2.5 million things people will do for a small, fixed fee.

== SaaP marketplace platforms ==
As of November 1, 2014, a number of SaaP marketplace platforms exist. These include a variety of platforms serving different markets and niches. Currently the marketplaces offering SaaP include brands offering offline services, online services, shift work, and more. Below is a list of known market platforms offering SaaP. There are also other SaaP marketplaces online in the so-called "sharing economy".

- Airbnb offers a market platform for hosts and guests of Bed and Breakfast, guest housing and other room and board for travellers.
- Etsy is an online market platform for customers shopping for the works of arts and crafts providers.
- Handy (company) is a market online for and mobile cleaning and home repair booking services.
- Lyft is a marketplace platform for taxi related car services.
- TaskRabbit is a market of service providers and clients in the offline space. Vendors provide services such as gardening, carpentry, plumbing, cleaning, moving and more.
- Thumbtack (website) is a marketplace for customers in need of writers and writing and translation services.
- Traveling Spoon is a food tourism platform that connects travelers with local hosts who prepare homemade local cuisine in their homes.
- Uber offers vehicle for hire and food delivery services
- Upwork is an online work and performance market for customers and vendors of computer-related services.
- Zipcar is a carsharing company with cars provided and managed by the company.

Notable challenges exist in the regulatory space for AirBnB in locations like New York, where unregulated guest housing and hotel services are an issue. Other services like the car-sharing services of Lyft have settled lawsuits and Uber faces opposition from governments and from regulated and licensed taxi services.
