= Todd Rasmussen =

Surgeon

Todd E. Rasmussen (born c. 1965) is an American Professor of Surgery and Consultant in Vascular and Endovascular Surgery at the Mayo Clinic in Rochester, Minnesota where he serves as Director of the Gonda Vascular Center. Rasmussen has recently been appointed as Chief Surgical Officer for Humacyte through an agreement which has him continuing his clinical, administrative and educational responsibilities at Mayo. In this role he will work with scientists, engineers and clinicians at the company, federal regulatory bodies and surgeons in the U.S. and abroad to optimize the safe and effective study and clinical integration of several of Humacyte's universally implantable vascular tissues. Rasmussen served as Vice Chair of Education in the Department of Surgery at Mayo Clinic for 3 years prior to assuming leadership of the Gonda Vascular Center and starting this most recent position with Humacyte. Prior to joining the Mayo Clinic in 2021, he had a 28-year active duty career in the military, retiring as an Air Force Colonel in 2021. His last military assignments were as Associate Dean or Research at the F. Edward Hebert School of Medicine at the Uniformed Services University of the Health Sciences and attending surgeon at the Walter Reed National Military Medical Center in Bethesda, Maryland.

== Personal life and education ==
A native of central Kansas, Rasmussen completed his undergraduate degree in pharmacy and premedical studies at the University of Kansas (1989) and his medical degree at Mayo Medical School (1993). He completed an active duty general surgery residency at Wilford Hall Air Force Medical Center at Lackland Air Force Base, Texas (1999) and then vascular surgery specialty training at Mayo Clinic which he completed in the summer of 2001.

== Career ==
Rasmussen had been assigned to Andrews Air Force Base just before the 11 September attacks, and soon after began caring for the injured returning from Afghanistan at Walter Reed Army Medical Center. He began a series of deployments to the Air Force Theater Hospital on Balad Air Base as well as Bagram Air Base and the Afghan National Army Hospital in Kabul, Afghanistan. During this time in the Air Force, he initiated a research and innovation program aimed at developing a better understanding of vascular injury, hemorrhage control and shock as well as new approaches to managing these conditions.

Rasmussen has led surgical and casualty training missions in Morocco, Pakistan, and Russia, and his research efforts have resulted in hundreds of publications, including two textbooks, the Handbook of Patient Care in Vascular Diseases and the third and fourth editions of Rich's Vascular Trauma. He co-authored "Vascular Injury Rates in the Wars in Iraq and Afghanistan", in which he wrote that the frequency of vascular injury on the battlefield has increased by a factor of five between Vietnam and the later wars. Rasmussen was also one of the investigators in the Military Application of Tranexamic Acid in Trauma Resuscitation Study (MATTERS), which was a collaboration with British researchers on the use of tranexamic acid (TXA) in patients with severe bleeding. The study indicated that patients treated with TXA survived twice as often as those who did not receive the drug.

Rasmussen is a co-inventor of resuscitative endovascular balloon occlusion of the aorta (REBOA), a minimally invasive approach used to sustain blood pressure and control bleeding in severely injured and shocked patients. The ER-REBOA catheter has been used thousands of times in the U.S. and around the world.

In 2019, Rasmussen led a team of military surgeons at the Walter Reed National Military Medical Center as the first in the Military Health System (MHS) to implant Humacyte's human acellular vessel, or HAV, into a patient who was in danger of losing his leg from vascular disease. Rasmussen had previously worked in support of the research and development of this bioengineered blood vessel which has significant potential to be used in the management of wartime vascular injury. Rasmussen continued work with this vascular conduit, recently completing a 4-year FDA supported clinical study under a physician-sponsored IND at the Mayo Clinic. It is his surgical experience with the product - now referred to as the Acellular Tissue Engineered Vessel (ATEV) (tradename Symvess)- and his work with the scientists and engineers who developed it that underpins his recent move to Chief Surgical Officer for the company.

Rasmussen was a 2019–2020 Association of American Medical Colleges (AAMC) Council of Deans fellow, and in February 2020 he delivered the Peter Safar lecture at the Society of Critical Care Medicine in Orlando, Florida. In 2021, Rasmussen was selected to serve on the board of the National Museum of Civil War Medicine. Following his retirement from the Air Force he joined the Division of Vascular and Endovascular Surgery at the Mayo Clinic in Rochester, Minnesota.

Rasmussen served as Deputy Commander of the Institute of Surgical Research from 2010 to 2013 and then moved to direct the larger Department of Defense Combat Casualty Care Research Program at Fort Detrick, Maryland. His awards include the Gold Headed Cane for distinction in clinical and academic practice, the NATO Dominique Jean Larrey Award for Excellence in Military Surgery, and in 2015, he was recognized as a Hero in Medicine by the Center for Public-Private Partnerships.

Rasmussen has contributed to articles published in USA Today, the Health Affairs blog, The New England Journal of Medicine, and most recently with National Public Radio journalists Quil Lawrence and Daniel Estrin. In May 2026 Rasmussen and colleague Dr. Jeremy Cannon published an OpEd in the Philadelphai Inquirer proposing that the Iran war is testing the U.S. Military Health System.
