= Ethiraj College for Women =

Educational institution in India

- Motto: To strive, to seek, to find and not to yield
- Type: Autonomous
- Established: 1948; 78 years ago
- Founder: V. L. Ethiraj
- Affiliations: University of Madras
- Chairman: V. M. Muralidharan
- Principal: S. Uma Gowrie
- Location: Chennai, Tamil Nadu, India
- Campus: Urban
- Website: www.ethirajcollege.edu.in

Ethiraj College for Women is an arts and science college for women in Chennai, India, managed by the Ethiraj College Trust. It was founded in 1948 by the barrister V. L. Ethiraj of Vellore.

== History ==
=== Chairmen ===
- V. L. Ethiraj (1948–60)
- V. T. Rangaswami (1960–72)
- N. Mahalingam (1972–80)
- Justice S. Natarajan (1980–98)
- Justice S. Jagadeesan (1998–2008)
- A. M. Swaminathan, IAS (Retd.) (2008–13)
- V. M. Muralidharan (2013–19)
- Chandra Devi Thanikachalam (2019–22)
- V. M. Muralidharan (2022–present)

=== Principals ===
- Subur Parthasarathy (1948–49, 1950–52)
- Mona Hensman (1953–60)
- Evangeline Matthew (1960–76)
- K. Vasanthi Devi (1976–84)
- N. A. Qadir (1984–85)
- Keser Chander (1985–88)
- Yasodha Shanmugasundaram (1988–94)
- Indhrani Sridharan (1994–2005)
- M. Thavamani (2005–11)
- Jothi Kumaravel (2011–14)
- A. Nirmala (2014–18)
- S. Kothai (2019–22)
- S. Uma Gowrie (2023–present)

== Ranking ==
College rankings

General – India
- NIRF (Colleges) (2022): 65

The college is ranked 79th among colleges in India by the National Institutional Ranking Framework (NIRF) in 2024.

== Notable alumni ==
- Trisha Krishnan, actress
- Aishwarya Rajesh, actress
- Sreethu Krishnan, actress
- Chandini Tamilarasan, actress
- Dhivyadharshini, TV host
- Dhivya Suryadevara, economist, former CFO of both the General Motors, and Stripe.
- Dipika Pallikal, Indian squash player
- Jayanthi Natarajan, former Union Cabinet Minister
- Joshna Chinappa, Indian squash player
- Kanimozhi Rajathi Karunanidhi, Member of Parliament of the Republic of India
- Latha Rajinikanth, film producer and singer
- Leesha Eclairs, TV actress
- Raveena Ravi, Dubbing artist and Actress
- Madhumila, TV actress
- Meenakshi Chitharanjan, Indian classical dancer and choreographer
- Molly Easo Smith, Indian-American professor
- Padma Subrahmanyam, Indian classical dancer and musician
- Preetha Krishna, businesswoman
- Sudha Ragunathan, singer
- Sudha Shah, former Indian cricketer and national coach
- Sujata Sridhar, former Indian cricketer
- Sriya Reddy, actress
- Shvetha Jaishankar, model, entrepreneur, author, beauty pageant title holder
- Tamilisai Soundararajan, doctor, politician, and the Governor of Telangana
- Thamizhachi Thangapandian, South Chennai Constituency Member of Parliament (LS)
- J. Vijaya, India's first woman herpetologist
- Srinisha Jayaseelan, singer
- Priyanka Deshpande, television anchor and actress
- Devaki Vijayaraman, television cook and the winner of MasterChef India – Tamil (season 1)
- Roshini Haripriyan, television actress
- Aparna Gopinath, Indian film actress
