= Ashok Parthasarathi =

Indian science and technology policy expert

- Born: 1940
- Died: 12 August 2019 (age 79)

Ashok Parthasarathi (1940–2019) was an Indian physicist and electronics engineer who served as a Science and Technology Advisor to Prime Minister Indira Gandhi. He played a crucial role in India's science and technology policies and helped the country become self-reliant in the field.

He was the son of the diplomat Gopalaswami Parthasarathy, and the grandson of the civil servant and statesman N. Gopalaswami Ayyangar.

== Life and career ==
Parthasarathi did research in radio astronomy at the University of Cambridge, UK with Martin Ryle. He subsequently taught physics at the Birla Institute of Technology & Science, Pilani. Afterwards, he studied science policy at the Massachusetts Institute of Technology, US.

From 1967 to 1970, Parthasarathi served as Special Assistant to Vikram Sarabhai, the Chairman of the Atomic Energy Commission. From 1970 to 1976, and again from 1980 to 1984, he was Special Assistant for Science and Technology to Prime Minister Indira Gandhi. He worked closely with Indira Gandhi's Principal Secretary P. N. Haksar to create the foundation for modern Indian science and technology. He held important positions in the Department of Scientific and Industrial Research, the Department of Electronics, and the Ministry of New and Renewable Energy.

Parthasarathi helped establish public sector enterprises in the 1970s that would manufacture critical products such as microchips and optic fibres, at a time when India could not afford to import latest technologies.

He also was involved in defence matters, such as being consulted by the government during the 1971 Indo-Pakistani War, and playing a key role in the 1974 nuclear test in Pokhran.

Following his retirement from the government in 2000, he wrote extensively on science policy; he also served as a professor at the Centre for Studies in Science Policy, Jawaharlal Nehru University from 2000 to 2005, upon invitation.

== Death ==
A. Parthasarathi died after a period of illness at his residence in New Delhi on August 12, 2019, and was survived by his wife Vibha Parthasarathi, and sons Vibodh and Unmesh.

== Books ==
- Parthasarathi, Ashok (2007). Technology at the Core: Science & Technology with Indira Gandhi. Dorling Kindersley (India) Pvt. Ltd., licensees of Pearson Education in South Asia. ISBN 9788131701706.
