= Traveling Spoon =

Food tourism company

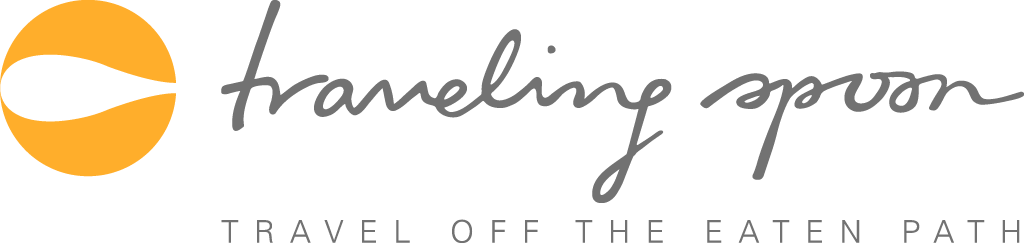
- Type: Private
- Industry: Food tourism
- Founded: 2011
- Founders: Stephanie Lawrence; Aashi Vel
- Headquarters: San Francisco, California, United States
- Number of locations: Bangladesh; Cambodia; China; Greece; Hong Kong; India; Indonesia; Japan; Mexico; Philippines; Singapore; South Korea; Sri Lanka; Taiwan; Thailand; Turkey; Vietnam; Lebanon
- Area served: Worldwide
- Services: Regional cuisine; Cooking classes
- Website: travelingspoon.com

Traveling Spoon is a San Francisco, California-based food tourism startup company that connects travelers with local hosts who prepare homemade local cuisine in their homes. Travelers can also purchase cooking classes and visit marketplaces for cooking ingredients with their hosts. The company offers home dining packages in 38 cities in 15 countries located throughout South and Southeast Asia and Japan.

Traveling Spoon was founded by Stephanie Lawrence and Aashi Vel and its beta site launched in July 2013. The bootstrapped company is a graduate of the Venture Lab Program at the University of California, Berkeley's Center for Entrepreneurship and Technology. The Venture Lab program also awarded the company $12,000 in prize money.

== History ==
Stephanie Lawrence and Aashi Vel founded Traveling Spoon shortly after they met in 2011 at the Haas School of Business, where they were students in the school's Master of Business Administration program. The two connected over a similar desire to eat indigenous cuisine prepared by locals and learn about native cultures they encountered when traveling abroad. Traveling Spoon started a pilot program in December 2011 and had its first customers in January 2012. The company launched its beta website in July 2013. In May 2014, Traveling Spoon raised funding from Erik Blachford, the former CEO of Expedia and The Chennai Angels. In 2015, Traveling Spoon launched programs in the Philippines and India, which includes 12 cities within the country.

== Operations ==
Traveling Spoon offers homemade meals from 200 local hosts in 18 countries. Traveling Spoon has hosts in Mexico, South and Southeast Asia and Japan, including Turkey, China, Vietnam, India and the Philippines. Aside from in-home meals, Traveling Spoon also offers cooking experiences and local market tours.

Traveling Spoon pairs a traveler's food restrictions and preferences, group size and budget with a host. When a traveler registers, they are able to specify dietary restrictions including vegetarian and vegan. In the case a host is unable to meet dietary restrictions, Traveling Spoon ensures meals are tailored to the traveler's profile.

All hosts are personally vetted by the company, which conducts interviews, in-house visits, and taste tests. Hosts must have some proficiency in English and have Internet access. The majority of hosts are women. Hosts determine the price of meals and many offer special packages that include cooking classes or market trips.
