= V. L. Ethiraj =

Indian lawyer and philanthropist

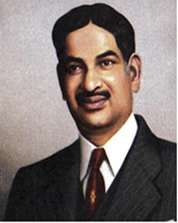
- Born: 18 July 1890; Vellore, Madras Presidency, British India
- Died: 18 August 1960 (aged 70)
- Education: Presidency College, Chennai; Trinity College Dublin
- Occupation: Lawyer
- Known for: Barrister and the Founder of the Ethiraj College for Women
- Spouse: Kathreen

Vellore Lakshmanaswamy Ethiraj (18 July 1890 – 18 August 1960) was an Indian lawyer and philanthropist who founded Ethiraj College for Women, a college in Chennai, India. He was the first Indian to be appointed as a Crown Prosecutor by the British Raj. He also served as the President of the Madras Bar Association.

Ethiraj was born on 18 July 1890 in a Arcot Mudaliar family of Vellore and was born to Lakshmanaswamy and Ammayi Ammal. V. L. Ethiraj received his undergraduate degree from Presidency College, Chennai and received his law degree from Trinity College Dublin.

One of Ethiraj's successes was the Lakshmikanthan murder case, which he successfully fought in defense of Tamil actors M. K. Thyagaraja Bhagavathar and N. S. Krishnan. His advocacy was described by C. P. Ramaswami Iyer as "a marvel of the 20th century". He mentored a number of young lawyers in Madras including his nephew M. Narayan Moorthy, who later became a Justice on Madras High Court.

== See also ==
- Education in Chennai
