= Sangarsha (TV series) =

Indian television series

- Genre: Drama
- Directed by: Lokesh; Shruti Naidu
- Starring: Tejaswini Shekar; Vanitha Vasu; Rohith Rangaswamy
- Country of origin: India
- Original language: Kannada
- No. of episodes: 580

Production
- Producer: Shruti Naidu
- Running time: 22 minutes

Original release
- Network: Star Suvarna
- Release: 15 June 2020 – 20 May 2022

Sangarsha is an Indian Kannada language drama on Star Suvarna which premiered from 15 June 2020. It is an official remake of Star Vijay's TV series Ayutha Ezhuthu which stars Tejaswini Shekar, Vanitha Vasu and Rohith Rangaswamy.

== Plot ==
District collector officer Indira gets into a tiff with Bairadevi while she tries to open school for educating unprivileged people in the village while Bairadevi tries to shut it and bring them under her control keeping them uneducated. Meanwhile, Indira falls in love with Bairadevi's son unaware that he is her son.

== Cast ==
- Indira (portrayed by Tejaswini Shekar)
- Bairadevi (portrayed by Vanitha Vasu)
- Raja (portrayed by Rohith Rangaswamy): Bairadevi's son
- Umapathi
- Bhupala
- Anaga: Vishwa's love interest
- Vishwa: Anaga's love interest
- Sathyamurthi: He advices and warns Indira on Bhiradevi's evil plans

=== Guest appearances ===
- Hariprriya as Goddess Devi

== Production ==
The series was supposed to premiere on 23 March 2020. However, owing COVID-19 outbreak in India, production and shootings were stalled on 19 March 2020 and Kannada television shootings were permitted from June 2020. This made it to postpone and premiere on 15 June 2020. In September 2020, the series had a crossover with Muddulakshmi.

== Adaptations ==
Language	Title	Original release	Network(s)	Last aired	Notes
Tamil	Ayutha Ezhuthu ஆயுத எழுத்து	15 July 2019	Star Vijay	18 September 2020	Original
Kannada	Sangarsha ಸಂಘರ್ಷ	15 June 2020	Star Suvarna	20 May 2022	Remake
