= Traumatic cardiac arrest =

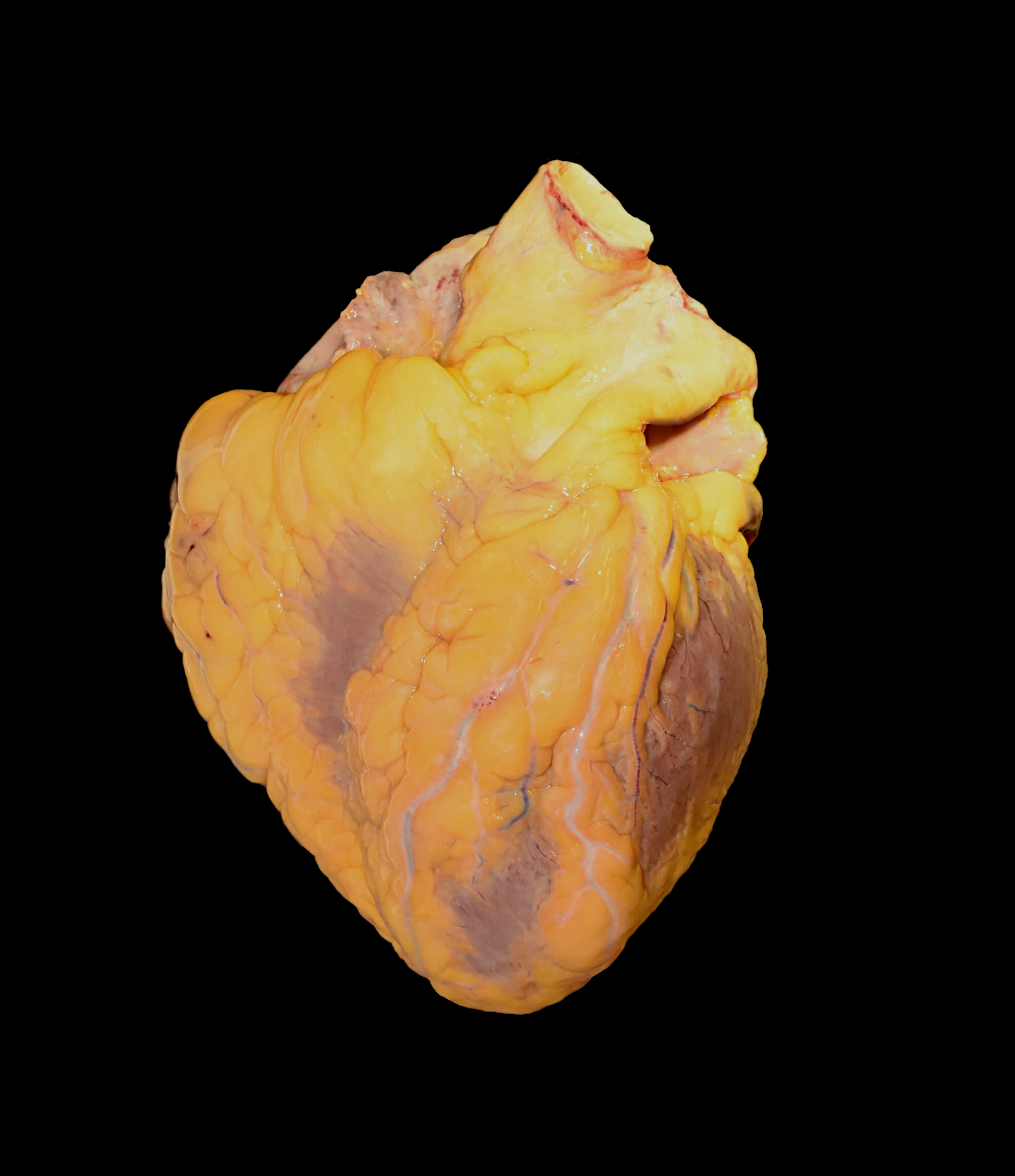
- Human heart from an autopsy
- Specialty: Cardiology, Emergency Medicine, Critical Care, Trauma
- Usual onset: Acute onset following trauma to the chest
- Causes: Blunt or penetrating trauma to the chest
- Diagnostic method: ECG, chest x-ray, bedside echocardiogram
- Differential diagnosis: Hemorrhagic shock, tension pneumothorax, hemothorax, cardiac tamponade, hypoxia
- Treatment: Thoracotomy, thoracostomy, fluid resuscitation, decompression, pericardiocentesis
- Prognosis: Poor

Traumatic cardiac arrest (TCA) is a condition in which the heart has ceased to beat due to blunt or penetrating trauma, such as a stab wound to the thoracic area. It is a medical emergency which will always result in death without prompt advanced medical care. Even with prompt medical intervention, survival without neurological complications is rare. In recent years, protocols have been proposed to improve survival rate in patients with traumatic cardiac arrest, though the variable causes of this condition as well as many coexisting injuries can make these protocols difficult to standardize. Traumatic cardiac arrest is a complex form of cardiac arrest often derailing from advanced cardiac life support in the sense that the emergency team must first establish the cause of the traumatic arrest and reverse these effects, for example hypovolemia and haemorrhagic shock due to a penetrating injury.

== Mechanism ==
Traumatic cardiac arrest can occur in patients following any severe blunt or penetrating injury to the chest. Following the traumatic event, the heart ceases to pump blood through the body. Unlike medical cardiac arrest, there are several potentially reversible causes that may result in cardiac arrest in the setting of trauma. Clinicians will rapidly assess for these causes, and interventions will be directed to the specific cause.

=== Massive hemorrhage ===
In both blunt and penetrating trauma, massive internal or external bleeding may decrease the volume of blood is available to be pumped by the heart to the body. This is considered preload dependent arrest.

=== Tension pneumothorax ===
Tension pneumothorax is caused when air is able to enter the space between the lung and the chest wall, but is not able to escape. The increasing pressure within the chest cavity prevents blood from returning from the body to fill the heart.

=== Hemothorax ===
Hemothorax occurs when injury to the chest results in bleeding into the thoracic cavity. Similar to tension pneumothorax, increasing pressure prevents the return of blood from circulation to the heart.

=== Cardiac tamponade ===
In the setting of trauma, cardiac tamponade results from an acute pericardial effusion, the accumulation of blood within the sac that surrounds the heart. As this sac is filled with fluid, the pressure on the heart is increased, and the chambers of the heart are unable to fill with blood.

=== Hypoxia ===
Inability to maintain oxygenation in trauma patients may be a result of airway compromise due to mechanical injury or obstruction or due to loss of the respiratory drive from cervical spine or peripheral nerve injury. These conditions result in the hypoxia that may lead to cardiac arrest.

== Signs and symptoms ==
An example EKG for pulseless electrical activity. In this rhythm, cardiac activity will be seen on electrocardiogram, but a pulse will not be felt on provider's exam.

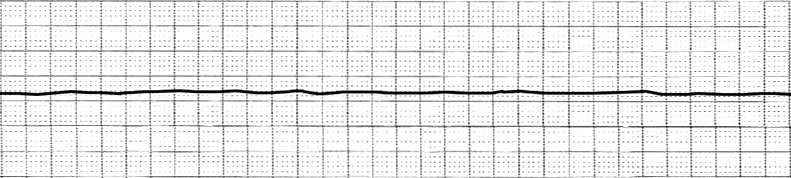
An EKG showing asystole, or "flat-lining."

Patients will present following a traumatic event most often with pulseless electrical activity (PEA). Patients will exhibit low blood pressure with pulses that cannot be palpated. Patients will progress into asystole if the underlying condition is not reversed. Other non-specific signs and symptoms associated with impending traumatic cardiac arrest may include sweating, altered mental status, rapid or slow breathing, and signs of trauma (bruising, laceration, fractures, etc.).

== Diagnosis ==
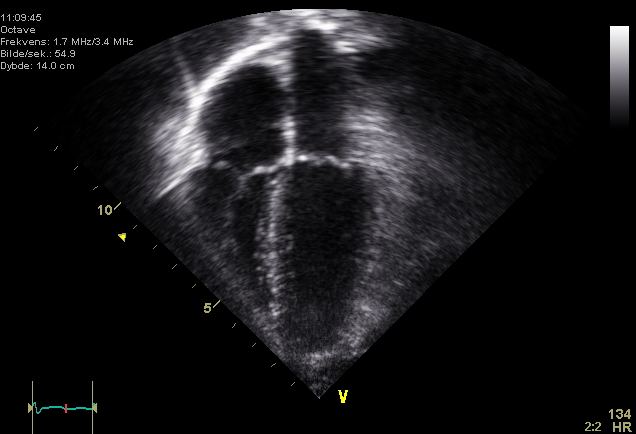
Echocardiogram is a study in which an ultrasound is used to exam the function of the heart. In Traumatic cardiac arrest, an echocardiogram may show ineffective motion of the heart and may provide clues that point to a specific cause of the arrest.

Diagnosis of traumatic cardiac arrest is initially made with electrocardiogram with EMS or in the emergency department. Clinicians will also order diagnostic testing that may include chest x-ray, bedside ultrasound and echocardiogram, and blood gas levels. A type and cross will be ordered to match the patient to receive blood transfusion if necessary.

Other work-up involved in diagnosis of a trauma patient may include e-FAST, RUSH exam, CBC, pelvic X-ray, and CT of the head, neck, chest, abdomen, and pelvis.

== Treatment ==
Treatment of traumatic cardiac arrest is guided by advanced trauma life support guidelines. Standard advanced cardiac life support guidelines are inappropriate for use in traumatic cardiac arrest, as they are directed primarily at treating pathology originating within the heart itself. As clinicians begin to intervene, they will simultaneously seek reversible causes of the arrest. Management begins by establishing multiple points of IV access and evaluating the patient's airway and breathing. Other interventions may include thoracostomy and thoracotomy, as well as treatment of the underlying cause of arrest.

=== Basic life support ===
Basic life support is commonly initiated by bystanders and first responders, but the role of basic life support in traumatic cardiac arrest is unclear. Basic life support is targeted to maintain oxygenation and circulation throughout the body, which can be lifesaving in cases of medical cardiac arrest, but does not address the frequent large volume blood loss encounters in many cases of traumatic cardiac arrest.

=== Chest compressions ===
Chest compressions are considered the most important initial intervention in cases of medical cardiac arrest, however studies evaluating their efficacy have excluded patients with traumatic cardiac arrest. Chest compressions work to replace the cardiac function of pumping blood throughout the body, however cases where the heart is either unable to fill with blood or the total blood volume is depleted, this intervention may be ineffective. Additionally, as many of the interventions targeted at specific causes of arrest are centered around procedures performed around the patient's chest, head, and neck, compressions may interfere with definitive management.

=== Management of reversible causes ===
Reversible causes of traumatic cardiac arrest and treatment
Condition	Goal of Treatment	Initial Treatment	Definitive Treatment
Hypovolemia	Restore circulating volume	Providers will initially establish IV access to provide large volume fluid resuscitation and may use tourniquets or bandages to control bleeding	These patients will likely require blood transfusion for definitive management
Tension pneumothorax	Relieve pressure within the chest cavity	Initial treatment may include needle decompression	Definitive treatment for most patients will include tube thoracostomy
Hemothorax	Relieve pressure within the chest cavity		Management requires tube thoracostomy
Cardiac tamponade	Relieve pressure within the pericardium	Initial treatment may require pericardiocentesis. This procedure may be sufficient to resolve the tamponade, or further management may be required.	Patient with cardiac tamponade following penetrating trauma may be good candidates for thoracotomy
Hypoxia	Increase oxygen content of the blood	Treatment of hypoxia is aimed at maintaining the patient's airway and controlling breathing. Initial treatment may include bag-valve mask, nasopharyngeal airway, oropharyngeal airway, or other airway devices	Definitive management may require intubation or cricothyrotomy

=== Future directions ===
Current guidelines tailored to treatment of specific causes of traumatic cardiac arrest have improved outcomes for patients, however these guidelines may be difficult to apply in a standardized manner due to differences in pre-hospital care and the wide variety of causes of traumatic cardiac arrest compared to medical cardiac arrest. Evolving algorithms are directed at quickly identifying incidences of cardiac arrest with a traumatic source and rapidly intervening to address reversible causes.

== Prognosis ==
Historically, traumatic cardiac arrest was thought to lead invariably to death. More recently, evolutions of advanced trauma life support guidelines and improved understanding of the underlying causes of traumatic cardiac arrest have improved outcomes for patients. Recent studies suggest that the survival rate for traumatic cardiac arrest is similar to that of all-cause cardiac arrest. There is wide variability in the estimated survival rate based on factors that include initiation of pre-hospital care and nature of injury.

Many patients who survive traumatic cardiac arrest may develop long-term neurological damage resulting from lack of circulation to the nervous system during the arrest. This damage may range from moderate disability to a persistent vegetative state. A 2012 review suggests that while survival rates of traumatic cardiac arrest are higher in children, so is the incidence of neurological complication.
