= Panchagni (TV series) =

Indian Malayalam soap opera

- Genre: Drama
- Directed by: Manoj Sreekalam
- Starring: Lima Babu; Jayakrishnan; Anoop Surya; Vaishnavi Sai Kumar; Dileep Shankar
- Country of origin: India
- Original language: Malayalam
- No. of seasons: 1
- No. of episodes: 269

Production
- Production location: Thiruvananthapuram, Kerala

Original release
- Network: Flowers TV
- Release: 5 August 2024 – 31 May 2025

Panchagni is an Indian Malayalam-language soap opera directed by Manoj Sreekalam. It aired on Flowers TV from 5 August 2024 to 31 May 2025. It stars Lima Babu, Jayakrishnan, Anoop Surya, Vaishnavi Sai Kumar and Dileep Shankar in lead roles. The title of the series is adapted from 1986 Malayalam film Panchagni.

== Synopsis ==
Renuka is wife of Chandrasenan and they have three daughters. At the time of her fourth delivery, she laboured twin daughters and she died. Chandrasenan refused to take these children as he wanted a boy. He married Kalavathy a rich woman. Kalavathy married him in condition to avoid all the five daughters. Amrita, elder daughter took care of all others alone. Years later, they begin a restaurant named Pancharatnam. Kalavathy tries in many ways to close their business.

== Cast ==
- Dileep Shankar/ Firosh as Chandrasenan
- Rajashri Nair as Renuka
- Vaishnavi Saikumar as Kalavathy
- Anoop Soorya as Sumesh
- Karthika Kannan as Shyamala
- Saji Vakkanad as Sahadevan
- Jayakrishnan as Abhimanyu
- Leema Babu / Veena Nair as Amrita
- Ashika/Della George as Anakha
- Sindhu Varma as Ambika
- Kiran Dev as Akash
- Manu Martin as Vivek
- Prasanth kumar p as Jayesh
- Rubeena as Aradhya
- Rubiseena as Athira
- Aishwariyaa Bhaskaran as Prabhavathi

== Production ==
The majority of shooting took place at Thiruvananthapuram, Kerala. Dileep Shankar who appeared as Chandrasenan, lead role of the series was found dead on 29 December 2024 in a private hotel at Vanross Junction. He rented the hotel room for the shooting of the series before four days and had not been seen outside for the last two days. The other actors of the series called the actor on the phone but could not reach him. After which, they arrived at the hotel to check up on Dileep and Hotel staff discovered his body after noticing a foul smell coming from the room. Police confirmed that the actor died before two days. Police have recovered some medicines for Liver diseases and empty liquor bottles from his room. Manoj Sreekalam, the director of the series stated that the actor had been suffering from a serious illness and was receiving treatment for it but the nature of the illness is unknown to them.
