= The Chennai Angels =

Indian angel investment group

- Type: Private
- Industry: Angel Network
- Founded: 2007
- Headquarters: Chennai
- Website: www.thechennaiangels.com

The Chennai Angels (TCA) is an angel investment group based in Chennai, India.

They have funded companies such as Popxo, Metroplots, Traveling Spoon, HitWicket, Brigge, Cloud Cherry, Syona Cosmetics, Velvet Case, Fourth Partner amongst others.
