= Dhivya Suryadevara =

American businessperson

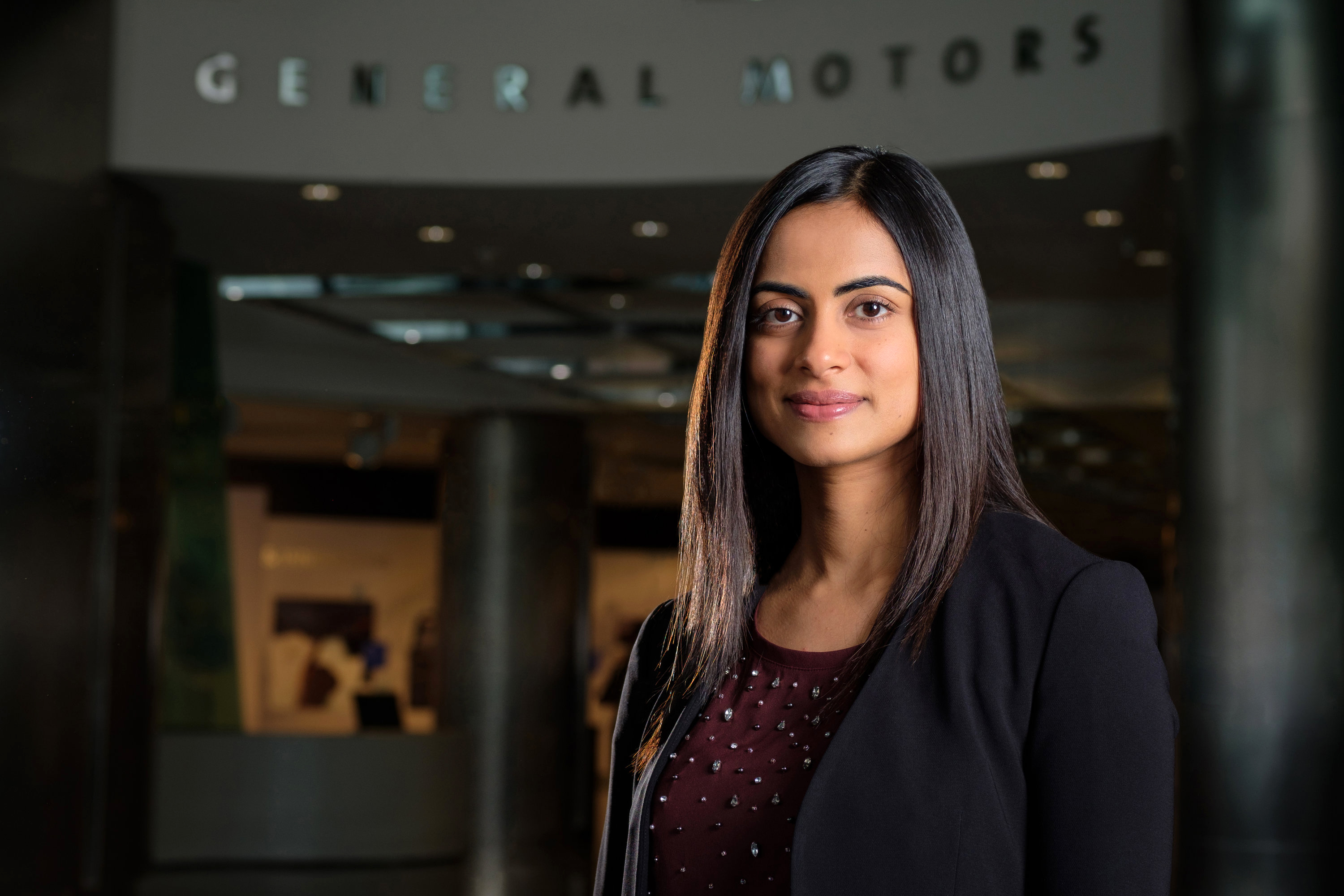
- Suryadevara in 2018
- Born: Madras, (now Chennai); Tamil Nadu, India
- Education: University of Madras; Institute of Chartered Accountants of India; Harvard Business School; CFA Institute
- Occupation: Co‑President
- Employer: Fiserv
- Spouse: Raj Suryadevara
- Children: 1
- Awards: Fortune's 40 Under 40

Dhivya Suryadevara is an Indian-American executive and Co‑President at Fiserv. She is the former CEO of Optum Insight and Optum Financial, part of UnitedHealth Group. She also served as the chief financial officer of Stripe and spent 16 years at General Motors, where she ultimately served as chief financial officer.

== Early life and education ==
Dhivya Suryadevara was born in a Telugu family in Chennai, India. She and her two sisters were raised by her mother, who worked in Syndicate Bank in Chennai.

Suryadevara studied in St John's Senior Secondary School in Mandaveli, Chennai. She did her bachelor's degree in commerce from the Ethiraj College for Women of the University of Madras. She later went on to pursue Chartered Accountancy at the Institute of Chartered Accountants of India. She is also a chartered financial analyst, and has an MBA from Harvard Business School.

== Career ==
Suryadevara started her career at PricewaterhouseCoopers while attending the University of Madras. She then interned at the World Bank in 2002 and went on to UBS as an investment banker. She joined General Motors in 2004. In 2013, she was appointed the CFO and chief investment officer of GM Asset Management. In 2015, she accepted a role as Vice President of Finance and Treasurer. In 2017, she became the first female chief financial officer at General Motors.

On August 13, 2020, Suryadevara resigned her position as chief financial officer at General Motors to work as chief financial officer for e-commerce payments company, Stripe.

Suryadevara joined UnitedHealth Group in February of 2024 as Chief Executive Officer of Optum Financial and is a member of the UnitedHealth Group executive management team.

Suryadevara was named to Fortune's 40 Under 40 in 2015 and 2018.
